= 2011 Credit Suisse Women's Masters Basel =

- Host city: Basel, Switzerland
- Arena: Curlingzentrum Region Basel
- Dates: October 7–9
- Winner: (Sweden) Margaretha Sigfridsson
- Curling club: Umeå, Sweden
- Skip: Margaretha Sigfridsson
- Third: Christina Bertrup
- Second: Maria Wennerström
- Lead: Maria Prytz
- Finalist: (Switzerland) Mirjam Ott

The 2011 Credit Suisse Women's Masters Basel were held from October 7 to 9 at the Curlingzentrum Region Basel in Basel, Switzerland as part of the 2011–12 World Curling Tour. The purse for the event was CHF32,050. The event was played in a triple knockout format.

== Teams ==
Skip	Third	Second	Lead	Locale
Wang Bingyu	Liu Yin	Yue Qingshuang	Zhou Yan	Harbin, China
Linda Klímová	Lenka Černovská	Kamila Mošová	Katerina Urbanová	Czech Republic
Anna Kubešková	Tereza Plíšková	Veronika Herdová	Eliška Jalovcová	Czech Republic
Sanna Puustinen	Heidi Hossi	Eszter Juhász	Oona Kauste	Finland
Ellen Vogt	Riikka Louhivuori	Tiina Suuripää	Maija Salmiovirta	Finland
Andrea Schöpp	Imogen Oona Lehmann	Corinna Scholz	Stella Heiß	Füssen, Germany
Juliane Jacoby	Franziska Fischer	Josephine Obertsdorf	Martina Fink	Germany
Daniela Driendl	Martina Linder	Marika Trettin	Gesa Angrick	Germany
Diana Gaspari	Giorgia Apollonio	Veronica Gerbi	Claudia Alverá	Italy
Laura Gualtiero	Veronica Zappone	Sara Levetti	Arianna Losano	Italy
Jackie Lockhart	Karen Kennedy	Kay Adams	Sarah Macintyre	Edinburgh, Scotland
Anette Norberg	Cecilia Östlund	Sara Carlsson	Liselotta Lennartsson	Harnosand, Sweden
Margaretha Sigfridsson	Christina Bertrup	Maria Wennerström	Maria Prytz	Umeå, Sweden
Anna Hasselborg	Sabina Kraupp	Margaretha Dryburgh	Zandra Flyg	Sweden
Jonna McManus	Sara McManus	Anna Huhta	Sofia Mabergs	Sweden
Mirjam Ott	Carmen Schäfer	Carmen Küng	Janine Greiner	Switzerland
Silvana Tirinzoni	Irene Schori	Esther Neuenschwander	Sandra Gantenbein	Switzerland
Michèle Jäggi	Marisa Winkelhausen	Stéphanie Jäggi	Nicole Schwägli	Bern, Switzerland
Binia Feltscher	Marlene Albrecht	Franziska Kaufmann	Christine Urech	Switzerland
Melanie Wild	Regina Rohner	Laura Wunderlin	Gabriela Welti	Lucerne, Switzerland
Corrine Bourquin	Fabienne Fürbringer	Daniela Rupp	Andrea Friedli	Uitikon, Switzerland
Alina Pätz	Claudia Hug	Nicole Dünki	Fabiola Duss	Basel, Switzerland
Camille Crottaz	Andrea Marx	Bettina Marx	Eléonore Pravex	Geneva, Switzerland
Melanie Barbezat	Briar Hürlimann	Mara Gautschi	Janine Wyss	Basel, Switzerland

== Results ==
=== A Event ===
First Knockout		Semifinals		Qualifier 1
(Switzerland) Mirjam Ott	9
(Czech Republic) Anna Kubeskova	4	(Switzerland) Mirjam Ott	6
(Sweden) Anna Hasselborg	5	(Sweden) Anna Hasselborg	3
(Switzerland) Corrine Bourquin	3			(Switzerland) Mirjam Ott	6
(Switzerland) Binia Feltscher	6			(Switzerland) Binia Feltscher	3
(Finland) Ellen Vogt	4	(Switzerland) Binia Feltscher	7
(China) Wang Bingyu	9	(China) Wang Bingyu	3
(Sweden) Jonna McManus	3

First Knockout		Semifinals		Qualifier 2
(Sweden) Margaretha Sigfridsson	11
(Finland) Sanna Puustinen	0	(Sweden) Margaretha Sigfridsson	7
(Scotland) Jackie Lockhart	12	(Scotland) Jackie Lockhart	6
(Germany) Juliane Jacoby	2			(Sweden) Margaretha Sigfridsson	6
(Switzerland) Alina Pätz	3			(Czech Republic) Linda Klimova	5
(Czech Republic) Linda Klimova	7	(Czech Republic) Linda Klimova	8
(Germany) Andrea Schöpp	5	(Germany) Andrea Schöpp	7
(Switzerland) Melanie Barbezat	4

First Knockout		Semifinals		Qualifier 3
(Sweden) Anette Norberg	7
(Switzerland) Melanie Wild	2	(Sweden) Anette Norberg	7
(Italy) Diana Gaspari	5	(Switzerland) Camille Crottaz	6
(Switzerland) Camille Crottaz	6			(Sweden) Anette Norberg	5
(Switzerland) Michèle Jäggi	9			(Switzerland) Silvana Tirinzoni	6
(Italy) Laura Gualtiero	2	(Switzerland) Michèle Jäggi	2
(Switzerland) Silvana Tirinzoni	9	(Switzerland) Silvana Tirinzoni	6
(Germany) Daniela Driendl	1

=== B Event ===
Second Knockout
(Czech Republic) Anna Kubeskova	3
(Switzerland) Corrine Bourquin	5
(Finland) Ellen Vogt	6
(Sweden) Jonna McManus	3

Quarterfinals
(Switzerland) Melanie Wild	6
(Switzerland) Corrine Bourquin	3
(Italy) Diana Gaspari	8
(Finland) Ellen Vogt	1

Semifinals
(Switzerland) Melanie Wild	4
(Germany) Andrea Schöpp	7
(Italy) Diana Gaspari	3
(Switzerland) Michèle Jäggi	5

To Qualifier 4
(Germany) Andrea Schöpp	4
(Switzerland) Michèle Jäggi	5

Second Knockout
(Finland) Sanna Puustinen	4
(Germany) Juliane Jacoby	5

Quarterfinals
(Italy) Laura Gualtiero	4
(Germany) Juliane Jacoby	10

Semifinals
(China) Wang Bingyu	8
(Germany) Juliane Jacoby	5

To Qualifier 4
(China) Wang Bingyu	8
(Czech Republic) Linda Klimova	2
Qualifier 4
(Switzerland) Michèle Jäggi	6
(China) Wang Bingyu	5

Second Knockout		To Qualifier 5
(Scotland) Jackie Lockhart	7
(Switzerland) Camille Crottaz	2	(Scotland) Jackie Lockhart	5
		(Switzerland) Binia Feltscher	1

Second Knockout
(Switzerland) Alina Pätz	8
(Switzerland) Melanie Barbezat	6

Quarterfinals
(Germany) Daniela Driendl	6
(Switzerland) Alina Pätz	4

Semifinals
(Sweden) Anna Hasselborg	4
(Germany) Daniela Driendl	3

To Qualifier 5
(Sweden) Anna Hasselborg	4
(Sweden) Anette Norberg	5
Qualifier 5
(Scotland) Jackie Lockhart	4
(Sweden) Anette Norberg	8

=== C Event ===
Third Knockout		Semifinals		Qualifier 6
(Switzerland) Melanie Wild	5
(Switzerland) Camille Crottaz	6	(Switzerland) Camille Crottaz	1
		(Sweden) Anna Hasselborg	9
				(Sweden) Anna Hasselborg	5
				(China) Wang Bingyu	6

Third Knockout
(Sweden) Jonna McManus	7
(Finland) Sanna Puustinen	5

Quarterfinals
(Sweden) Jonna McManus	6
(Switzerland) Corrine Bourquin	0

Semifinals
(Sweden) Jonna McManus	5
(Germany) Daniela Driendl	3

To Qualifier 7
(Sweden) Jonna McManus	2
(Switzerland) Binia Feltscher	3

Third Knockout
(Czech Republic) Anna Kubešková	5
(Switzerland) Melanie Barbezat	6

Quarterfinals
(Switzerland) Melanie Barbezat	6
(Finland) Ellen Vogt	4

Semifinals
(Germany) Juliane Jacoby	4
(Switzerland) Melanie Barbezat	6

To Qualifier 7
(Switzerland) Melanie Barbezat	4
(Germany) Andrea Schöpp	6
Qualifier 7
(Switzerland) Binia Feltscher	8
(Germany) Andrea Schöpp	3

Third Knockout
(Italy) Laura Gualtiero	6
(Switzerland) Alina Pätz	4

Quarterfinals
(Italy) Diana Gaspari	7
(Italy) Laura Gualtiero	3

Semifinals
(Italy) Diana Gaspari	6
(Czech Republic) Linda Klimova	7

Qualifier 8
(Czech Republic) Linda Klimova	3
(Scotland) Jackie Lockhart	6

== Playoffs ==
Quarterfinals
(Switzerland) Mirjam Ott	4
(Scotland) Jackie Lockhart	3
(Switzerland) Silvana Tirinzoni	4
(China) Wang Bingyu	8
(Switzerland) Michèle Jäggi	8
(Sweden) Anette Norberg	4
(Sweden) Margaretha Sigfridsson	9
(Switzerland) Binia Feltscher	1

Semifinals
(Switzerland) Mirjam Ott	7
(China) Wang Bingyu	2
(Switzerland) Michèle Jäggi	1
(Sweden) Margaretha Sigfridsson	9

Final
(Switzerland) Mirjam Ott	3
(Sweden) Margaretha Sigfridsson	7
