= 2013 Glynhill Ladies International =

- Host city: Glasgow, Scotland
- Arena: Braehead Curling Rink
- Dates: January 18–20
- Winner: (Switzerland) Binia Feltscher
- Curling club: CC Flims, Flims
- Skip: Binia Feltscher
- Third: Irene Schori
- Second: Franziska Kaufmann
- Lead: Christine Urech
- Finalist: (Canada) Heather Nedohin

The 2013 Glynhill Ladies International was held from January 18 to 20 at the Braehead Curling Rink in Glasgow, Scotland as part of the 2012–13 World Curling Tour. The event was held in a round robin format, and the purse for the event was GBP£8,000, of which the winner, Binia Feltscher, received GBP£2,500. Feltscher defeated Heather Nedohin of Canada in the final with a score of 8–1.

== Teams ==
The teams are listed as follows:

| Skip | Third | Second | Lead | Alternate | Locale |
|---|---|---|---|---|---|
| Kerry Barr | Rachel Simms | Rhiann McLeod | Barbara McPake | | Edinburgh, Scotland |
| Daniela Driendl | Martina Linder | Marika Trettin | Analena Jentsch | | Füssen, Germany |
| Binia Feltscher | Irene Schori | Franziska Kaufmann | Christine Urech | | Flims, Switzerland |
| Iveta Janatová (fourth) | Zuzana Hájková (skip) | Klára Svatoňová | Alžběta Baudyšová | Petra Vinsová | Prague, Czech Republic |
| Michèle Jäggi | Marisa Winkelhausen | Stéphanie Jäggi | Melanie Barbezät | | Bern, Switzerland |
| Angelina Jensen | Camilla Jensen | Ane Hansen | Ivan Bratic | | Hvidovre, Denmark |
| Oona Kauste | Heidi Hossi | Marjo Hippi | Sanna Puustinen | | Vantaa, Finland |
| Linda Klímová | Kamila Mošová | Pavla Proksiková | Katerina Urbanová | | Prague, Czech Republic |
| Alina Kovaleva | Oxana Gertova | Aleksandra Saitova | Ulia Portunova | | Moscow, Russia |
| Anna Kubešková | Tereza Plíšková | Veronika Herdová | Veronika Herdová | | Prague, Czech Republic |
| Jackie Lockhart | Karen Kennedy | Katrina Davidson | Annie Laird | | Edinburgh, Scotland |
| Jonna McManus | Sara McManus | Anna Huhta | Sofia Mabergs | | Gävle, Sweden |
| Eve Muirhead | Anna Sloan | Vicki Adams | Claire Hamilton | | Stirling, Scotland |
| Heather Nedohin | Beth Iskiw | Jessica Mair | Laine Peters | | (Canada) Edmonton, Alberta |
| Anette Norberg | Cecilia Östlund | Sabina Kraupp | Sara Carlsson | | Harnosand, Sweden |
| Mirjam Ott | Carmen Schäfer | Carmen Küng | Janine Greiner | | Davos, Switzerland |
| Lene Nielsen | Helle Simonsen | Jeanne Ellegaard | Maria Poulsen | | Hvidovre, Denmark |
| Anna Sidorova | Liudmila Privivkova | Margarita Fomina | Ekaterina Galkina | Nkeiruka Ezekh | Moscow, Russia |
| Iveta Staša-Šaršūne | Ieva Krusta | Zanda Bikše | Dace Munča | Una Grava-Germane | Jelgava, Latvia |
| Silvana Tirinzoni | Marlene Albrecht | Esther Neuenschwander | Sandra Gantenbein | | Aarau, Switzerland |
| Lorna Vevers | Sarah Reid | Alice Spence | Kay Adams | | Stirling, Scotland |
| Ellen Vogt | Tiina Suuripää | Maija Salmiovirta | Riikka Louhivuori | | Helsinki, Finland |
| Wang Bingyu | Liu Yin | Yue Qingshuang | Zhou Yan | | Harbin, China |
| Olga Zharkova | Victoria Moiseeva | Alisa Tregub | Julia Guzieva | Ekaterina Sharapova | Kaliningrad, Russia |

== Round robin standings ==
Final Round Robin Standings

Key
| Teams to Playoffs |

| Pool A | W | D | L |
|---|---|---|---|
| (Russia) Anna Sidorova | 4 | 1 | 0 |
| (Germany) Daniela Driendl | 2 | 1 | 2 |
| (Switzerland) Mirjam Ott | 2 | 1 | 2 |
| (Scotland) Kerry Barr | 2 | 1 | 2 |
| (Czech Republic) Linda Klímová | 2 | 0 | 3 |
| (Sweden) Jonna McManus | 1 | 0 | 4 |

| Pool B | W | D | L |
|---|---|---|---|
| (Canada) Heather Nedohin | 4 | 0 | 1 |
| (Russia) Alina Kovaleva | 3 | 0 | 2 |
| (Switzerland) Silvana Tirinzoni | 3 | 0 | 2 |
| (Finland) Ellen Vogt | 3 | 0 | 2 |
| (Denmark) Angelina Jensen | 1 | 1 | 3 |
| (Scotland) Jackie Lockhart | 0 | 1 | 4 |

| Pool C | W | D | L |
|---|---|---|---|
| (Switzerland) Michèle Jäggi | 5 | 0 | 0 |
| (Denmark) Lene Nielsen | 3 | 0 | 2 |
| (Sweden) Anette Norberg | 2 | 1 | 2 |
| (Scotland) Lorna Vevers | 2 | 0 | 3 |
| (Czech Republic) Anna Kubešková | 1 | 1 | 3 |
| (Finland) Oona Kauste | 1 | 0 | 4 |

| Pool D | W | D | L |
|---|---|---|---|
| (Scotland) Eve Muirhead | 3 | 0 | 2 |
| (Switzerland) Binia Feltscher | 3 | 0 | 2 |
| (Czech Republic) Zuzana Hájková | 3 | 0 | 2 |
| (China) Wang Bingyu | 2 | 1 | 2 |
| (Russia) Olga Jarkova | 2 | 1 | 2 |
| (Latvia) Iveta Staša-Šaršūne | 1 | 0 | 4 |

== Playoffs ==
Quarterfinals
(Russia) Anna Sidorova | 2
(Switzerland) Binia Feltscher | 4
(Switzerland) Michèle Jäggi | 7
(Russia) Alina Kovaleva | 4
(Canada) Heather Nedohin | 6
(Germany) Daniela Driendl | 3
(Scotland) Eve Muirhead | 7
(Denmark) Lene Nielsen | 2

Semifinals
(Switzerland) Binia Feltscher | 8
(Switzerland) Michèle Jäggi | 3
(Canada) Heather Nedohin | 6
(Scotland) Eve Muirhead | 2

Final
(Switzerland) Binia Feltscher | 8
(Canada) Heather Nedohin | 1
