= Czech Women's Curling Championship =

The Czech Women's Curling Championship (Czech: MČR žen) is the national championship of women's curling in the Czech Republic. It has been held annually since 1991 and organized by the Czech Curling Association.

== List of champions ==
Teams line-up in order: fourth, third, second, lead, alternate, coach; skips marked in bold.

Year	Champion	Runner-up	Bronze
1991	Bohemian CC (BCC); **Veronika Svobodová**, Eva Šenfeldová, Lenka Šafránková, Andrea Sotorníková	CC Zbraslav (Zbraslav Z); **Monika Havlová**, Helena Mašková, Alexandra Klímová, Štěpánka Adamčíková, alternates: Klára Nováková, Irena Vodáková	CC Savona (CC Savona Ž); **Marcela Neumannová**, Milena Břízová, Alena Samueliová, Jana Břízová, alternate: Milena Vojtušová
1992	Bohemian CC (BCC); **Veronika Svobodová**, Eva Šenfeldová, Lenka Šafránková, Pavla Rubášová, alternate: Andrea Sotorníková	CC Savona (CC Savona Ž); **Marcela Neumannová**, Milena Břízová, Alena Samueliová, Jana Břízová, alternate: Helena Šulcová	CC Zbraslav 1 (Zbraslav 1); **Alexandra Klímová**, Jaroslava Koucká, Štěpánka Adamčíková, Zdenka Řípová
1993	CC Citadela; **Eva Šenfeldová**, Lenka Šafránková, Pavla Rubášová, Andrea Sotorníková, alternate: Jaroslava Koucká	CC Savona 1 team line-up N/A	CC Yetti 1 team line-up N/A
1994	CC Citadela; **Eva Petráková**, Lenka Šafránková, Pavla Rubášová, Věra Růžková, alternate: Jana Svobodová	CC SVD Montaž; **Renée Lepšíková**, Renáta Kubínová, Jitka Papežová, Monika Kubínová	Bohemian CC M **Monika Havlová**, Kateřina Jurková, Hana Špinková, Marcela Maxová
1995	CC Montaž; **Renée Lepšíková**, Renáta Kubínová, Monika Kubínová, Jitka Papežová, Simona Vlčková	CK Zlatá Praha; **Dagmar Šedivá**, Helena Vošická, Veronika Povolná, Jana Zikmundová, alternate: Michaela Brožová	Bohemian CC S **Alexandra Klímová**, Dana Janoušková, Štěpánka Adamčíková, Hana Bolardtová, alternate: Helena Holakovská
1996	CC Citadela; **Lenka Šafránková**, Eva Petráková, Pavla Rubášová, Věra Růžková, alternate: Jaroslava Koucká	Bohemian CC H **Hana Špinková**, Monika Klímová, Marcela Maxová, Eva Dvořáková	CC Montaž; **Renée Lepšíková**, Renáta Kubínová, Jitka Papežová, Simona Vlčková, Monika Maršálová
1997	CC Citadela; **Lenka Šafránková**, Eva Petráková, Pavla Rubášová, Věra Růžková, alternates: Helena Holakovská, Jana Pleskačová, Slavěna Podloucká	CC Aritma 2; **Jana Linhartová**, Michaela Murínová, Petra Murínová, Mirka Krolopová	Bohemian CC H **Hana Špinková**, Monika Klímová, Marcela Maxová, Eva Dvořáková, alternate: Hana Plzáková
1998	CC Montaž; **Renée Lepšíková**, Renáta Kubínová, Jitka Papežová, Simona Wrightová	CC Letící Kameny Praha 1; **Hana Špinková**, Monika Klímová, Hana Plzáková, Eva Dvořáková	CC Aritma 2; **Jana Linhartová**, Michaela Murínová, Petra Murínová, Irena Laštovková
1999	CC Citadela; **Lenka Šafránková**, Eva Petráková, Pavla Rubášová, Věra Růžková, alternates: Helena Holakovská, Slavěna Podloucká, Jana Pleskačová	CC Aritma 2; **Jana Linhartová**, Michaela Murínová, Petra Murínová, Irena Laštovková	CK Montaž; **Renée Lepšíková**, Renáta Kubínová, Jitka Papežová, Simona Wrightová, alternate: Monika Maršálová
2000	CC Kolibris 2; **Eva Štampachová**, Šárka Doudová, Hana Synáčková, Vendula Blažková, alternates: Martina Budělovská, Barbora Novotná, Gabriela Novotná	CC Letící Kameny; **Hana Čechová**, Hana Plzáková, Lucie Říhová, Eva Dvořáková, alternates: Monika Klímová, Marcela Hložánková	CC Savona 1; **Renée Lepšíková**, Kateřina Lepšíková, Milena Vojtušová, Alena Samueliová, alternate: Helena Šulcová
2001	CC Citadela; **Pavla Rubášová**, Věra Netušilová, Lenka Šafránková, Eva Petráková, alternates: Jana Pechková, Vlastimila Strnadová	CC Savona 1; **Renée Lepšíková**, Hana Synáčková, Milena Vojtušová, Alena Samueliová	CC Kolibris 2; **Eva Štampachová**, Šárka Doudová, Barbora Novotná, Vendula Blažková, alternate: Gabriela Novotná
2002	CC Citadela; **Pavla Rubášová**, Věra Netušilová, Lenka Šafránková, Eva Petráková, alternate: Jana Pechková	CC Kolibris 2; **Eva Štampachová**, Šárka Doudová, Barbora Novotná, Vendula Blažková, alternate: Eva Seifertová	CC Aritma 2; **Petra Murínová**, Michaela Murínová, Helena Řípová, Jana Linhartová, alternates: Kristýna Fenclová, Renée Lepšíková
2003	Citadela; **Pavla Rubášová**, Lenka Šafránková, Eva Petráková, Věra Netušilová, alternate: Jana Pechková	CC Savona L **Hana Synáčková**, Lenka Kitzbergerová, Karolína Pilařová, Jana Jelínková, alternate: Lenka Kučerová	Kolibris 1; **Vendula Blažková**, Jana Beránková, Kateřina Pavlíková, Irena Polívková, alternate: Tereza Matásková
2004	CC Savona L **Hana Synáčková**, Lenka Kitzbergerová, Lenka Kučerová, Jana Jelínková, alternate: Karolína Pilařová	Kolibris 2; **Šárka Doudová**, Eva Štampachová, Michala Souhradová, Eva Seifertová, alternate: Anna Cermanová	CC Aritma 2Ž; **Jana Nováková**, Michaela Murínová, Renée Lepšíková, Petra Murínová, alternate: Kristýna Fenclová
2005	Savona H **Hana Synáčková**, Ivana Danielisová, Lenka Kučerová, Karolína Pilařová	Hungary Ž **Ildikó Szekeres**, Alexandra Bérez, György Nagy, Krisztina Bartalus	Kolibris 2; **Eva Štampachová**, Michala Souhradová, Eva Seifertová, Iveta Janatová
2006	Savona H **Hana Synáčková**, Ivana Danielisová, Lenka Kučerová, Karolína Pilařová	Dion SJ; **Kateřina Urbanová**, Lenka Černovská, Jana Šimmerová, Dana Chabičovská, alternate: Zuzana Hájková	Aritma 3; **Anna Kubešková**, Tereza Plíšková, Luisa Illková, Veronika Herdová, alternate: Eliška Jalovcová, coach: Karel Kubeška
2007	Dion SJ; **Kateřina Urbanová**, Lenka Černovská, Jana Šafaříková, Dana Chabičovská, alternate: Jana Šimmerová	(Hungary) Wallis; **Ildikó Szekeres**, Alexandra Bérez, György Nagy, Boglárka Ádám	Savona H **Hana Synáčková**, Ivana Danielisová, Lenka Kučerová, Karolína Pilařová, coach: Sune Frederiksen
2008	Dion SJ; **Kateřina Urbanová**, Lenka Černovská, Jana Šafaříková, Jana Šimmerová, alternate: Dana Chabičovská, coach: Vlastimil Vojtuš	Savona H **Hana Synáčková**, Ivana Danielisová, Pavla Rubášová, Karolína Pilařová, alternate: Lenka Kučerová, coach: Sune Frederiksen	Zbraslav D **Linda Klímová**, Michaela Nádherová, Kamila Mošová, Kristýna Feistová, alternate: Kristýna Kovaříková
2009	Savona H **Hana Synáčková**, Lenka Kitzbergerová, Pavla Rubášová, Lenka Kučerová, alternate: Karolína Pilařová	Aritma 3; **Anna Kubešková**, Tereza Plíšková, Luisa Illková, Eliška Jalovcová, alternate: Veronika Herdová, coach: Karel Kubeška	Dion SJ; Jana Šafaříková, **Lenka Černovská**, Zuzana Hájková, Kateřina Urbanová, alternate: Dana Chabičovská, coach: Vladimír Černovský
2010	Aritma 3; **Anna Kubešková**, Tereza Plíšková, Luisa Illková, Veronika Herdová, coach: Karel Kubeška	Dion SJ; Linda Klímová, **Lenka Černovská**, Jana Šafaříková, Kamila Mošová, alternate: Sára Jahodová, coach: Vladimír Černovský	Savona M **Martina Strnadová**, Zuzana Hájková, Iveta Janatová, Eva Málková, coach: Radek Boháč
2011	Dion SJ; **Linda Klímová**, Kamila Mošová, Lenka Černovská, Sára Jahodová, alternate: Jana Šafaříková, coach: Kateřina Urbanová	Savona M **Martina Strnadová**, Zuzana Hájková, Iveta Janatová, Eva Málková, coach: Radek Boháč	Kolibris 2; **Eva Štampachová**, Michala Souhradová, Klára Boušková, Eva Seifertová, alternate: Anna Urbanová
2012	Dion SJ; **Linda Klímová**, Kamila Mošová, Lenka Černovská, Kateřina Urbanová, coach: Vladimír Černovský	Savona M **Martina Strnadová**, Zuzana Hájková, Iveta Janatová, Eva Málková, coach: Radek Boháč	Savona H **Hana Synáčková**, Lenka Kitzbergerová, Karolína Frederiksen, Michaela Nádherová
2013	Aritma 3; **Anna Kubešková**, Tereza Plíšková, Klára Svatoňová, Veronika Herdová, coach: Karel Kubeška	Zbraslav W **Linda Klímová**, Kamila Mošová, Pavla Prokšíková, Kateřina Urbanová, alternate: Kateřina Samueliová, coach: Tomáš Válek	Savona H **Hana Synáčková**, Lenka Kitzbergerová, Michaela Nádherová, Karolína Frederiksen, alternate: Eliška Srnská, coach: Sune Frederiksen
2014	Zbraslav W **Linda Klímová**, Kamila Mošová, Kateřina Urbanová, Kateřina Samueliová, coach: David Šik	Liboc 3; **Anna Kubešková**, Tereza Plíšková, Klára Svatoňová, Alžběta Baudyšová, alternate: Veronika Herdová, coach: Karel Kubeška	Savona H **Hana Synáčková**, Lenka Kitzbergerová, Michaela Nádherová, Karolína Frederiksen, alternate: Eliška Srnská, coach: Sune Frederiksen
2015	Liboc 3; **Anna Kubešková**, Tereza Plíšková, Klára Svatoňová, Alžběta Baudyšová, coach: Karel Kubeška	Savona M **Eva Málková**, Iveta Janatová, Petra Vinšová, Martina Kajanová	Zbraslav W **Linda Klímová**, Kamila Mulačová, Zuzana Hájková, Kateřina Samueliová, alternate: Kateřina Urbanová, coach: David Šik
2016	Liboc 3; **Anna Kubešková**, Alžběta Baudyšová, Tereza Plíšková, Ežen Kolčevská, alternate: Klára Svatoňová, coach: Karel Kubeška	PLC LEDO; **Jana Načeradská**, Barbora Vojtušová, Monika Podrábská, Dana Chabičovská	Savona H **Martina Strnadová**, Lenka Kitzbergerová, Michaela Nádherová, Karolína Frederiksen, alternate: Eliška Srnská, coach: Jakub Bareš
2017	Liboc 3; **Anna Kubešková**, Alžběta Baudyšová, Tereza Plíšková, Klára Svatoňová, alternate: Ežen Kolčevská, coach: Karel Kubeška	Savona H Michaela Nádherová, **Martina Strnadová**, Eliška Srnská, Karolína Frederiksen, alternate: Lenka Kitzbergerová, coach: Jakub Bareš	Zbraslav W **Linda Klímová**, Zuzana Hájková, Alena Krofiková, Kateřina Urbanová, alternate: Kateřina Samueliová
2018	Liboc 3; **Anna Kubešková**, Alžběta Baudyšová, Tereza Plíšková, Klára Svatoňová, alternate: Ežen Kolčevská, coach: Karel Kubeška	Savona M Petra Vinšová, **Eva Málková**, Michaela Baudyšová, Iveta Janatová, alternate: Martina Kajanová	Savona H Michaela Nádherová, Lenka Kitzbergerová, **Hana Synáčková**, Martina Strnadová, alternate: Eliška Srnská, coach: Karolína Frederiksen
2019	Liboc 3; **Anna Kubešková**, Alžběta Baudyšová, Tereza Plíšková, Ežen Kolčevská, alternate: Eliška Soukupová, coach: Karel Kubeška	Zbraslav W **Zuzana Paulová**, Michaela Nádherová, Kateřina Rabochová, Kateřina Urbanová, alternate: Alena Krofiková	Savona H **Linda Klímová**, Hana Synáčková, Luisa Klímová, Karolína Frederiksen, alternate: Martina Strnadová, coach: Radek Klíma
2020	Liboc 3; **Anna Kubešková**, Alžběta Baudyšová, Michaela Baudyšová, Ežen Kolčevská, alternate: Petra Vinšová, coach: Karel Kubeška	Savona H **Hana Synáčková**, Karolína Frederiksen, Eliška Srnská	Savona M **Eva Miklíková**, Lenka Hronová, Markéta Taberyová, Eliška Soukupová
2021	cancelled because of COVID-19		
2022	Liboc 3 Anna Kubešková, Ežen Kolčevská, **Alžběta Baudyšová**, Michaela Baudyšová, alternates: Klára Svatoňová, Petra Vinšová, coach: Karel Kubeška	Savona H **Hana Synáčková**, Martina Strnadová, Eliška Srnská, Karolína Frederiksen, alternate: Linda Klímová	Ledolamky; **Karolína Špundová**, Zuzana Pražáková, Denisa Poštová, Andrea Krupanská, alternates: Kristina Podrábská, Ema Kotková, coach: Marek Černovský
2023	Liboc 3; **Alžběta Anna Zelingrová**, Michaela Baudyšová, Aneta Müllernová, Klára Svatoňová, altnerate: Anna Kubešková, coach: Karel Kubeška	Savona H **Hana Synáčková**, Karolína Frederiksen, Linda Klímová, Eliška Srnská, alternate: Lenka Vokounová, coach: Radek Klíma	Savona M **Lenka Hronová**, Iveta Janatová, Jana Načeradská, Eliška Soukupová, alternate: Eva Miklíková

== See also ==
- Czech Men's Curling Championship
- Czech Mixed Curling Championship
- Czech Mixed Doubles Curling Championship
- Czech Junior Curling Championships
- Czech Junior Mixed Doubles Curling Championship
