= Kateřina Urbanová =

Czech female curler and coach

- Curler ♀
- Born: 1 June 1984 (age 42)

Team
- Curling club: CC Dion, Prague, CC Zbraslav, Zbraslav, CZE

Curling career
- Member Association: Czech Republic
- World Championship: 2 (2008, 2012)
- European Championship: 5 (2007, 2008, 2011, 2012, 2014)
Medal record
Curling
Czech Women's Championship
Silver medal – second place	2019 Prague

Kateřina Urbanová (born 1 June 1984) is a Czech female curler and curling coach.

== Teams ==
Season	Skip	Third	Second	Lead	Alternate	Coach	Events
2007–08	Kateřina Urbanová (fourth)	Lenka Černovská (skip)	Jana Šafaříková	Dana Chabičovská (ECC); Sára Jahodová (WCC)	Sára Jahodová (ECC); Jana Šimmerová (WCC)	Vlastimil Vojtus	ECC 2007 (8th); WCC 2008 (12th)
2008–09	Kateřina Urbanová	Lenka Černovská	Jana Šafaříková	Jana Šimmerová	Zuzana Hájková (ECC)	Edward Dezura	ECC 2008 (10th)
2009–10	Linda Klímová	Lenka Černovská	Kamila Mošová	Kateřina Urbanová			
2011–12	Linda Klímová	Kamila Mošová	Lenka Černovská	Kateřina Urbanová	Paula Prokšíková (ECC); Sára Jahodová (WCC)	Vladimir Cernovsky	ECC 2011 (8th); WCC 2012 (12th)
2012–13	Linda Klímová	Kamila Mošová	Anna Kubešková	Kateřina Urbanová	Tereza Plíšková	Karel Kubeška, Daniel Rafael	ECC 2012 (8th)
2012–13	Linda Klímová	Kamila Mošová	Paula Prokšíková	Kateřina Urbanová			
2013–14	Linda Klímová	Kamila Mošová	Paula Prokšíková	Kateřina Urbanová			
2014–15	Linda Klímová	Kamila Mulačová	Kateřina Urbanová	Kateřina Samueliová	Zuzana Hájková	David Šik	ECC 2014 (10th)
2018–19	Zuzana Paulová	Michaela Nádherová	Kateřina Rabochová	Kateřina Urbanová	Alena Krofiková		CWCC 2019 (silver)

== Record as a coach of national teams ==
Year	Tournament, event	National team	Place
2011	2011 World Wheelchair Curling Championship	Czech Republic (wheelchair)	10
2012	2013 World Wheelchair Curling Championship – Qualification Event	Czech Republic (wheelchair)	5
2014	2015 World Wheelchair Curling Championship – Qualification Event	Czech Republic (wheelchair)	6
2015	2016 World Wheelchair Curling Championship – Qualification Event	Czech Republic (wheelchair)	10
