= Tereza Plíšková =

Czech curler

- Curler
- Born: 6 February 1990 (age 36); Prague, Czechoslovakia

Team
- Curling club: CC Artima, Prague, CC Sokol Liboc, Prague

Curling career
- Member Association: Czech Republic
- World Championship: 4 (2011, 2014, 2017, 2018)
- European Championship: 7 (2010, 2012, 2013, 2015, 2016, 2017, 2018)
- Other appearances: Winter Universiade: 1 (2011), World Junior Championships: 4 (2007, 2009, 2010, 2011), European Junior Challenge: 4 (2006, 2007, 2008, 2009)
Medal record
Curling
European Junior Challenge
Silver medal – second place	2007 Copenhagen
Silver medal – second place	2009 Copenhagen
Bronze medal – third place	2008 Prague
Czech Women's Championship
Gold medal – first place	2019 Prague

Tereza Plíšková (born 6 February 1990 in Prague) is a Czech curler.

== Teams ==
Season	Skip	Third	Second	Lead	Alternate	Coach	Events
2005–06	Kamila Mošová	Lenka Černovská	Linda Klímová	Anna Kubešková	Tereza Plíšková	Jana Linhartová	EJCC 2006 (5th)
2006–07	Anna Kubešková	Linda Klímová	Tereza Plíšková	Michaela Nadherová	Luisa Illková	Jirí Snítil	EJCC 2007 (silver); WJCC 2007 (9th)
2007–08	Anna Kubešková	Linda Klímová	Tereza Plíšková	Michaela Nadherová	Kamila Mošová	Jirí Snítil	EJCC 2008 (bronze)
2008–09	Anna Kubešková	Linda Klímová	Tereza Plíšková	Eliška Jalovcová	Martina Strnadová	Jiří Candra	EJCC 2009 (silver); WJCC 2009 (7th)
2009–10	Anna Kubešková	Tereza Plíšková	Martina Strnadová	Zuzana Hájková	Veronika Herdová	Jiří Candra	WJCC 2010 (8th)
2010–11	Anna Kubešková	Tereza Plíšková	Veronika Herdová	Eliška Jalovcová	Luisa Illková	Karel Kubeška	ECC 2010 (11th)
2010–11	Anna Kubešková	Linda Klímová	Tereza Plíšková	Eliška Jalovcová	Kamila Mošová	Karel Kubeška	WUG 2011 (7th)
2010–11	Anna Kubešková	Tereza Plíšková	Paula Proksikova	Eliška Jalovcová	Martina Strnadová	Karel Kubeška	WJCC 2011 (9th)
2010–11	Anna Kubešková	Tereza Plíšková	Luisa Illková	Eliška Jalovcová	Veronika Herdová	Karel Kubeška	WCC 2011 (12th)
2011–12	Anna Kubešková	Tereza Plíšková	Veronika Jalovcová	Luisa Illková	Veronika Herdová		
2012–13	Linda Klímová	Kamila Mošová	Anna Kubešková	Kateřina Urbanová	Tereza Plíšková	Karel Kubeška, Daniel Rafael	ECC 2012 (8th)
2012–13	Anna Kubešková	Tereza Plíšková	Klára Svatoňová	Veronika Herdová			
2013–14	Anna Kubešková	Tereza Plíšková	Martina Strnadová	Klára Svatoňová	Veronika Herdová	Karel Kubeška	ECC 2013 (6th)
2013–14	Anna Kubešková	Tereza Plíšková	Klára Svatoňová	Veronika Herdová	Martina Strnadová; Alžběta Baudyšová (WWCC)	Karel Kubeška (WWCC)	WCC 2014 (9th)
2014–15	Anna Kubešková	Tereza Plíšková	Klára Svatoňová	Veronika Herdová	Alžběta Baudyšová		
2015–16	Anna Kubešková	Alžběta Baudyšová	Tereza Plíšková	Klára Svatoňová	Ežen Kolčevská	Karel Kubeška	ECC 2015 (12th)
2015–16	Anna Kubešková	Tereza Plíšková	Klára Svatoňová	Alžběta Baudyšová			
2016–17	Anna Kubešková	Alžběta Baudyšová	Tereza Plíšková	Klára Svatoňová	Ežen Kolčevská	Karel Kubeška	ECC 2016 (4th); WCC 2017 (7th)
2017–18	Anna Kubešková	Alžběta Baudyšová	Tereza Plíšková	Klára Svatoňová	Ežen Kolčevská	Karel Kubeška	ECC 2017 (7th); WCC 2018 (6th)
2018–19	Anna Kubešková	Alžběta Baudyšová	Tereza Plíšková	Ežen Kolčevská	Eliska Soukupova	Karel Kubeška	ECC 2018 (8th); CWCC 2019 (gold)
