= 2022 Czech Mixed Doubles Curling Championship =

- Host city: Prague
- Dates: 26 February – 1 March 2022
- Winner: Dion WC (Julie Zelingrová / Vít Chabičovský)
- Coach: Petr Horák
- Finalist: Zbraslav H (Zuzana Paulová / Tomáš Paul)

The 2022 Czech Mixed Doubles Curling Championship (Czech: MČR mixed doubles 2022) was held in Prague from 26 February to 1 March, 2022.

Six teams took part in the championship.

The winners of the championship were team "Dion WC" (Julie Zelingrová / Vít Chabičovský), who beat team "Zbraslav H" (Zuzana Paulová / Tomáš Paul) in the final. The bronze medal was won by team "Trutnov 1" (Jana Jelínková / Ondřej Mihola).

The championship team represented the Czech Republic at the 2022 World Mixed Doubles Curling Championship.

== Teams ==
Team	Woman	Man	Coach
Dion CD	Dana Chabičovská	Vladimír Černovský	Marek Černovský
Dion WC	Julie Zelingrová	Vít Chabičovský	Petr Horák
Dion X	Klára Baudyšová	David Škácha	Petr Horák
Trutnov 1	Jana Jelínková	Ondřej Mihola	
Zbraslav H	Zuzana Paulová	Tomáš Paul	Jakub Bareš
Zbraslav Z	Martina Strnadová	Tomáš Válek	

== Round robin ==
Key
Teams to Playoffs

	Team	A1	A2	A3	A4	A5	A6	Wins	Losses	DSC, cm	Place
A1	Dion CD (Chabičovská / Černovský)	*	5:7	7:3	1:7	2:8	W	2	3	89.76	4
A2	Dion WC (Zelingrová / Chabičovský)	7:5	*	9:5	7:6	6:5	W	5	0	103.66	1
A3	Dion X (Baudyšová / Škácha)	3:7	5:9	*	2:11	3:8	W	1	4	32.40	5
A4	Trutnov 1 (Jelínková / Mihola)	7:1	6:7	11:2	*	5:3	W	4	1	47.66	2
A5	Zbraslav H (Paulová / Paul)	8:2	5:6	8:3	3:5	*	W	3	2	31.96	3
A6	Zbraslav Z (Strnadová / Válek)	L	L	L	L	L	*	0	5		6

== Playoffs ==
Semifinal
2	Trutnov 1 (Jelínková / Mihola)	5
3	Zbraslav H (Paulová / Paul)	8

Finals
1	Dion WC (Zelingrová / Chabičovský)	6	8	7
Zbraslav H (Paulová / Paul)	7	2	6

=== Semifinal ===
28 February, 17:30 UTC+1

Sheet 2	1	2	3	4	5	6	7	8	Final
Zbraslav H (Paulová / Paul)	0	2	1	2	0	3	0	X	8
Trutnov 1 (Jelínková / Mihola)	2	0	0	0	1	0	2	X	5

=== Final ===
Game 1
28 February, 14:00 UTC+1

Sheet 3	1	2	3	4	5	6	7	8	Final
Dion WC (Zelingrová / Chabičovský)	0	0	2	0	2	0	1	1	6
Zbraslav H (Paulová / Paul)	1	2	0	3	0	1	0	0	7

Game 2
28 February, 18:00 UTC+1

Sheet 2	1	2	3	4	5	6	7	8	Final
Zbraslav H (Paulová / Paul)	1	0	0	0	1	0	0	X	2
Dion WC (Zelingrová / Chabičovský)	0	2	2	1	0	2	1	X	8

Game 3
1 March, 14:00 UTC+1

Sheet 2	1	2	3	4	5	6	7	8	9	Final
Zbraslav H (Paulová / Paul)	0	1	0	2	0	1	0	2	0	6
Dion WC (Zelingrová / Chabičovský)	2	0	1	0	1	0	2	0	1	7

== Final standings ==
Place	Team	Woman	Man	Games	Wins	Losses	DSC, cm
1st place, gold medalist(s)	Dion WC	Julie Zelingrová	Vít Chabičovský	8	7	1	103.66
2nd place, silver medalist(s)	Zbraslav H	Zuzana Paulová	Tomáš Paul	9	5	4	31.96
3rd place, bronze medalist(s)	Trutnov 1	Jana Jelínková	Ondřej Mihola	6	4	2	47.66
4	Dion CD	Dana Chabičovská	Vladimír Černovský	5	2	3	89.76
5	Dion X	Klára Baudyšová	David Škácha	5	1	4	32.40
6	Zbraslav Z	Martina Strnadová	Tomáš Válek	5	0	5	

== See also ==
- 2022 Czech Men's Curling Championship
- 2022 Czech Women's Curling Championship
