= Luisa Illková =

Czech curler

- Curler ♀
- Born: 2 May 1988 (age 38)

Team
- Curling club: CC Artima, Prague

Curling career
- Member Association: Czech Republic
- World Championship: 1 (2011)
- European Championship: 1 (2010)
- Other appearances: European Mixed Championship: (2011), Winter Universiade: 1 (2009), World Junior Championships: 1 (2007), European Junior Challenge: 1 (2007)
Medal record
Curling
European Mixed Championship
Bronze medal – third place	2011 Tårnby
Czech Women's Championship
Gold medal – first place	2010
Silver medal – second place	2009
European Junior Challenge
Silver medal – second place	2007 Copenhagen

Luisa Illková (born 2 May 1988) is a Czech curler.

== Teams ==
=== Women's ===
Season	Skip	Third	Second	Lead	Alternate	Coach	Events
2006–07	Anna Kubešková	Linda Klímová	Tereza Plíšková	Michaela Nadherová	Luisa Illková	Jirí Snítil	EJCC 2007 (silver); WJCC 2007 (9th)
2008–09	Šárka Doudová	Kamila Mošová	Lenka Kučerová	Luisa Illková	Eva Štampachová	Karel Kubeška	WUG 2009 (5th)
2008–09	Anna Kubešková	Tereza Plíšková	Luisa Illková	Eliška Jalovcová	Veronika Herdová	Karel Kubeška	CWCC 2009 (silver)
2009–10	Anna Kubešková	Tereza Plíšková	Luisa Illková	Eliška Jalovcová		Karel Kubeška	CWCC 2010 (gold)
2010–11	Anna Kubešková	Tereza Plíšková	Veronika Herdová	Eliška Jalovcová	Luisa Illková	Karel Kubeška	ECC 2010 (11th)
2010–11	Anna Kubešková	Tereza Plíšková	Luisa Illková	Eliška Jalovcová	Veronika Herdová	Karel Kubeška	WCC 2011 (12th)
2011–12	Anna Kubešková	Tereza Plíšková	Veronika Jalovcová	Luisa Illková	Veronika Herdová		

=== Mixed ===
Season	Skip	Third	Second	Lead	Alternate	Coach	Events
2010–11	Kryštof Chaloupek	Eliška Jalovcová	David Jirounek	Luisa Illková	Tomáš Paul	Anna Kubešková	CMxCC 2011 (gold)
2011–12	Kryštof Chaloupek	Eliška Jalovcová	David Jirounek	Luisa Illková	Tomáš Paul	Karel Kubeška	EMxCC 2011 (bronze)
2012–13	Jiří Marša	Eliška Jalovcová	Jaroslav Vedral	Luisa Illková			CMxCC 2013 (bronze)

== Personal life ==
She started curling in 2003.
