= Ežen Kolčevská =

Czech curler

- Curler
- Born: 31 July 1995 (age 31); Chelyabinsk, Russia

Team
- Curling club: CC Sokol Liboc, Prague

Curling career
- Member Association: Czech Republic
- World Championship: 3 (2017, 2018, 2021)
- European Championship: 5 (2015, 2016, 2017, 2018, 2021)
- Other appearances: Winter Universiade: 1 (2019)
Medal record
Women's curling
Representing Czech Republic
Czech Women's Championship
Gold medal – first place	2016 Prague
Gold medal – first place	2017 Prague
Gold medal – first place	2018 Prague
Gold medal – first place	2019 Prague
Gold medal – first place	2020 Prague
Gold medal – first place	2022 Prague

Ežen Kolčevská (also written as Ezhen Kolchevskaia; born 31 July 31 1995 in Chelyabinsk) is a Czech curler.

== Career ==
Kolčevská played in her first World Women's Curling Championships in 2017 at the 2017 World Women's Curling Championship. There, the finished with a 5-6 record. At the 2017 Euros, they finished with a 3-6 record, qualifying once again for the World Championship. At the 2018 Ford World Women's Curling Championship, the Czech team qualified for the playoffs for the first time with a 6-6 record. They then lost the qualification game 7-3 to Russia's Victoria Moiseeva. The 2018 Europeans were not successful for the Czech's as they did not qualify for the World Championship. The following season, they would qualify for the Worlds, after going 3–6 at the 2019 European Curling Championships. The 2020 World Women's Curling Championship was cancelled due to the COVID-19 pandemic, but the team represented Czech Republic at the 2021 World Women's Curling Championship which was played in a bio-secure "bubble" to prevent spread of the virus. There, they finished in twelfth place with a 3–10 record.

== Personal life ==
As of 2020, she is employed as a barista.

== Teams ==
Season	Skip	Third	Second	Lead	Alternate	Coach	Events
2015–16	Anna Kubešková	Alžběta Baudyšová	Tereza Plíšková	Klára Svatoňová	Ežen Kolčevská	Karel Kubeška	ECC 2015 (12th)
2016–17	Anna Kubešková	Alžběta Baudyšová	Tereza Plíšková	Klára Svatoňová	Ežen Kolčevská	Karel Kubeška	ECC 2016 (4th); WWCC 2017 (7th)
2017–18	Anna Kubešková	Alžběta Baudyšová	Tereza Plíšková	Klára Svatoňová	Ežen Kolčevská	Karel Kubeška	ECC 2017 (7th); WWCC 2018 (6th)
2018–19	Anna Kubešková	Alžběta Baudyšová	Tereza Plíšková	Ežen Kolčevská	Eliška Soukupová	Karel Kubeška	ECC 2018 (8th); CWCC 2019 (gold)
2018–19	Alžběta Baudyšová	Michaela Baudyšová	Lenka Hronová	Ežen Kolčevská	Eliška Srnská	Jakub Bareš	WUG 2019 (9th)
2019–20	Anna Kubešková	Alžběta Baudyšová	Petra Vinšová	Ežen Kolčevská	Michaela Baudyšová	Karel Kubeška	ECC 2019 (6th)
2020–21	Anna Kubešková	Alžběta Baudyšová	Michaela Baudyšová	Ežen Kolčevská	Petra Vinšová	Karel Kubeška	WWCC 2021 (12th)
2021–22	Anna Kubešková	Alžběta Baudyšová	Michaela Baudyšová	Ežen Kolčevská	Klára Svatoňová	Karel Kubeška	ECC 2021 (9th)
2021–22	Anna Kubešková (Fourth)	Ežen Kolčevská	Alžběta Baudyšová (Skip)	Michaela Baudyšová	Klára Svatoňová, Petra Vinšová	Karel Kubeška	CWCC 2022 (gold)
