= 2022 Czech Men's Curling Championship =

- Host city: Prague
- Dates: 3–8 March 2022
- Winner: Zbraslav Klíma (Lukáš Klíma)
- Skip: Lukáš Klíma
- Third: Samuel Mokriš
- Second: Jiří Candra
- Lead: Marek Černovský
- Alternate: Radek Boháč
- Coach: Jan Zelingr
- Finalist: Kolibris 2 (Karel Hradec)

The 2022 Czech Men's Curling Championship (Czech: MČR mužů 2022) was held in Prague from March 3 to 8, 2022.

Four teams took part in the championship.

The team "Zbraslav Klíma" skipped by Lukáš Klíma won the championship (Klíma won his fifth title as player but third title as skip).

The 2022 Czech Women's Curling Championship was held simultaneously with this championship at the same arena.

== Teams ==
Team	Skip	Third	Second	Lead	Alternate	Coach
Kolibris 1	Marek Brožek (fourth)	Karel Hradec (skip)	Michal Zdenka	Jiří Chobot	Václav Pořt, Martin Štěpánek	
Kolibris NG	David Šik	Erik Šik	Jakub Hanák	Jakub Rychlý	Milan Polívka, Matěj Koudelka	
Trutnov 1	Radek Cerman (fourth)	Iain Dykes (skip)	Ondřej Mihola	Jiří Deyl		
Zbraslav Klíma	Lukáš Klíma	Samuel Mokriš	Jiří Candra	Marek Černovský	Radek Boháč	Jan Zelingr

== Round Robin ==
Three best teams to playoffs: first team to final "best of 3" series, 2nd and 3rd teams to semifinal.

	Team	A1	A2	A3	A4	Wins	Losses	Place
1	Kolibris 2 (Karel Hradec)	*	6:7; 7:6	6:5; 8:3	3:13; 5:11	3	3	3
2	Kolibris NG (David Šik)	7:6; 6:7	*	6:5; 9:8	8:7; 4:9	4	2	2
3	Trutnov 1 (Iain Dykes)	5:6; 3:8	5:6; 8:9	*	5:11; 4:8	0	6	4
4	Zbraslav Klíma (Lukáš Klíma)	13:3; 11:5	7:8; 9:4	11:5; 8:4	*	5	1	1

Teams to playoffs

== Playoffs ==
Semifinal			Final
			A-1	Zbraslav Klíma (Lukáš Klíma)	10	5	9
A-2	Kolibris NG (David Šik)	5	A-2	Kolibris 2 (Karel Hradec)	6	7	6
A-3	Kolibris 2 (Karel Hradec)	6

=== Semifinal ===
6 March, 16:00 UTC+1

Sheet 2	1	2	3	4	5	6	7	8	9	10	11	Final
Kolibris NG (David Šik) 🔨	0	1	0	0	0	1	1	1	0	1	0	5
Kolibris 2 (Karel Hradec)	0	0	0	1	1	0	0	0	3	0	1	6

=== Final ("best of 3" series) ===
Game 1. 7 March, 11:00

Sheet 2	1	2	3	4	5	6	7	8	9	10	Final
Zbraslav Klíma (Lukáš Klíma) 🔨	3	0	1	0	3	0	3	0	X	X	10
Kolibris 2 (Karel Hradec)	0	1	0	1	0	3	0	1	X	X	6

Game 2. 7 March, 18:00

Sheet 3	1	2	3	4	5	6	7	8	9	10	Final
Zbraslav Klíma (Lukáš Klíma)	0	0	1	0	1	1	1	0	1	0	5
Kolibris 2 (Karel Hradec) 🔨	2	1	0	2	0	0	0	1	0	1	7

Game 3. 8 March 29, 18:00

Sheet 2	1	2	3	4	5	6	7	8	9	10	Final
Zbraslav Klíma (Лукаш Клима) 🔨	1	0	4	0	2	0	0	2	0	X	9
Kolibris 2 (Karel Hradec)	0	2	0	1	0	1	1	0	1	X	6

== Final standings ==
Place	Team	Skip	Games	Wins	Losses
1st place, gold medalist(s)	Zbraslav Klíma	Lukáš Klíma	9	7	2
2nd place, silver medalist(s)	Kolibris 2	Karel Hradec	10	5	5
3rd place, bronze medalist(s)	Kolibris NG	David Šik	7	4	3
4	Trutnov 1	Iain Dykes	6	0	6

== See also ==
- 2022 Czech Women's Curling Championship
- 2022 Czech Mixed Doubles Curling Championship
