= 2007 World Junior Curling Championships =

- Host city: Eveleth, Minnesota
- Arena: Curl Mesabi
- Dates: March 3–11
- Men's winner: Canada
- Skip: Charley Thomas
- Third: Brock Virtue
- Second: Matthew Ng
- Lead: Kyle Reynolds
- Alternate: Geoff Walker
- Finalist: Sweden (Niklas Edin)
- Women's winner: Scotland
- Skip: Sarah Reid
- Third: Eve Muirhead
- Second: Barbara McFarlane
- Lead: Sarah MacIntyre
- Alternate: Alison Black
- Finalist: Canada (Stacie Devereaux)

The 2007 World Junior Curling Championships were held from March 3 to 11 at Curl Mesabi in Eveleth, Minnesota.

== Men ==
=== Teams ===
Country	Skip	Third	Second	Lead	Alternate
Canada	Charley Thomas	Brock Virtue	Matthew Ng	Kyle Reynolds	Geoff Walker
China	Wang Binjiang	Zang Jialiang	Wang Zi	Yang Tuo	
Czech Republic	Jakub Bares	Jiri Candra	Martin Hejhal	Martin Štěpánek	Ondrej Hurtik
Denmark	Rasmus Stjerne	Mikkel Krause	Oliver Dupont	Troels Harry	Patrick Blom
Germany	Daniel Neuner	Florian Zahler	Johannes Glaser	Dominik Greindl	Gabor Dénes
Norway	Stein Fredrik Mellemseter	Steffen Mellemseter	Kristian Rolvsfjord	Markus Høiberg	Øyvind Rogstad
Scotland	Logan Gray	Alasdair Guthrie	Glen Muirhead	Gordon McDougall	Greg Drummond
Sweden	Niklas Edin	Marcus Hasselborg	Emanuel Allberg	Fredrik Lindberg	Kristian Lindström
Switzerland	Christian von Gunten	Sven Michel	Sandro Trolliet	Michel Gribi	Claudio Pätz
United States	Chris Plys	Aanders Brorson	Matthew Perushek	Joel Cooper (Note: Cooper is now known as JayCee due to gender transition.)	Josh Bahr

=== Round-robin standings ===
Final round-robin standings

Key
Teams to Playoffs
Teams to Tiebreaker

Country	Skip	W	L
Canada	Charley Thomas	8	1
Sweden	Niklas Edin	7	2
Switzerland	Christian von Gunten	7	2
Denmark	Rasmus Stjerne	6	3
United States	Chris Plys	6	3
Scotland	Logan Gray	5	4
Norway	Stein Mellemseter	3	6
Germany	Daniel Neuner	2	7
China	Wang Binjiang	1	8
Czech Republic	Jakub Bares	0	9

=== Round-robin results ===
==== Draw 1 ====
Saturday, March 3, 14:00

Sheet A	1	2	3	4	5	6	7	8	9	10	Final
Germany (Neuner) 🔨	0	1	1	0	0	0	1	0	2	0	5
Sweden (Edin)	2	0	0	0	2	1	0	0	0	1	6

Sheet B	1	2	3	4	5	6	7	8	9	10	11	Final
China (Wang) 🔨	1	0	0	2	0	0	0	0	0	2	0	5
United States (Plys)	0	2	0	0	2	0	0	1	0	0	2	7

Sheet C	1	2	3	4	5	6	7	8	9	10	Final
Denmark (Stjerne) 🔨	1	0	0	0	0	2	0	2	0	0	5
Switzerland (von Gunten)	0	0	0	2	0	0	4	0	2	0	8

Sheet D	1	2	3	4	5	6	7	8	9	10	Final
Scotland (Gray)	0	1	0	0	2	1	1	0	0	1	6
Norway (Mellemseter) 🔨	2	0	0	1	0	0	0	1	1	0	5

Sheet E	1	2	3	4	5	6	7	8	9	10	Final
Canada (Thomas) 🔨	2	0	0	2	0	5	X	X	X	X	9
Czech Republic (Bares)	0	0	0	0	1	0	X	X	X	X	1

==== Draw 2 ====
Sunday, March 4, 9:00

Sheet A	1	2	3	4	5	6	7	8	9	10	Final
Canada (Thomas) 🔨	0	1	1	0	2	2	1	0	X	X	7
China (Wang)	0	0	0	1	0	0	0	1	X	X	2

Sheet B	1	2	3	4	5	6	7	8	9	10	11	12	Final
Switzerland (von Gunten) 🔨	0	0	1	0	0	1	1	0	2	0	0	1	6
Czech Republic (Bares)	0	1	0	0	1	0	0	2	0	1	0	0	5

Sheet C	1	2	3	4	5	6	7	8	9	10	Final
Germany (Neuner)	0	0	0	2	0	0	X	X	X	X	2
Scotland (Gray) 🔨	2	0	2	0	0	7	X	X	X	X	11

Sheet D	1	2	3	4	5	6	7	8	9	10	Final
Denmark (Stjerne) 🔨	0	0	0	1	0	0	X	X	X	X	1
Sweden (Edin)	0	3	1	0	2	2	X	X	X	X	8

Sheet E	1	2	3	4	5	6	7	8	9	10	Final
United States (Plys)	1	0	0	2	0	2	0	0	0	1	6
Norway (Mellemseter) 🔨	0	1	1	0	0	0	0	0	2	0	4

==== Draw 3 ====
Sunday, March 4, 19:00

Sheet A	1	2	3	4	5	6	7	8	9	10	Final
Norway (Mellemseter)	1	1	1	1	0	0	3	0	1	X	8
Czech Republic (Bares) 🔨	0	0	0	0	1	2	0	1	0	X	4

Sheet B	1	2	3	4	5	6	7	8	9	10	Final
Sweden (Edin) 🔨	1	0	0	1	1	0	1	0	0	1	5
Scotland (Gray)	0	0	3	0	0	0	0	1	0	0	4

Sheet C	1	2	3	4	5	6	7	8	9	10	Final
United States (Plys) 🔨	1	0	1	0	2	0	0	1	0	X	5
Canada (Thomas)	0	3	0	2	0	2	0	0	3	X	10

Sheet D	1	2	3	4	5	6	7	8	9	10	Final
Switzerland (von Gunten)	0	2	0	2	0	0	3	0	3	X	10
Germany (Neuner) 🔨	0	0	1	0	2	0	0	1	0	X	4

Sheet E	1	2	3	4	5	6	7	8	9	10	Final
Denmark (Stjerne)	0	0	2	2	0	0	2	2	X	X	8
China (Wang) 🔨	0	2	0	0	1	0	0	0	X	X	3

==== Draw 4 ====
Monday, March 5, 14:00

Sheet A	1	2	3	4	5	6	7	8	9	10	Final
Sweden (Edin)	0	2	0	2	0	3	0	0	1	X	8
United States (Plys) 🔨	1	0	1	0	1	0	1	0	0	X	4

Sheet B	1	2	3	4	5	6	7	8	9	10	Final
Denmark (Stjerne) 🔨	2	0	0	2	1	1	0	0	1	X	7
Germany (Neuner)	0	1	0	0	0	0	0	1	0	X	2

Sheet C	1	2	3	4	5	6	7	8	9	10	Final
China (Wang)	2	0	1	0	3	1	1	X	X	X	8
Czech Republic (Bares) 🔨	0	0	0	2	0	0	0	X	X	X	2

Sheet D	1	2	3	4	5	6	7	8	9	10	Final
Norway (Mellemseter) 🔨	2	0	1	0	1	0	0	1	0	1	6
Canada (Thomas)	0	1	0	1	0	1	2	0	2	0	7

Sheet E	1	2	3	4	5	6	7	8	9	10	Final
Scotland (Gray) 🔨	0	1	0	0	1	0	1	1	1	0	5
Switzerland (von Gunten)	1	0	0	2	0	2	0	0	0	1	6

==== Draw 5 ====
Tuesday, March 6, 9:00

Sheet A	1	2	3	4	5	6	7	8	9	10	Final
Denmark (Stjerne)	1	1	0	0	2	0	1	0	4	0	9
Canada (Thomas) 🔨	0	0	3	0	0	1	0	2	0	1	7

Sheet B	1	2	3	4	5	6	7	8	9	10	Final
United States (Plys)	0	2	2	0	1	4	X	X	X	X	9
Switzerland (von Gunten) 🔨	1	0	0	0	0	0	X	X	X	X	1

Sheet C	1	2	3	4	5	6	7	8	9	10	Final
Sweden (Edin) 🔨	1	0	0	1	0	3	0	0	2	1	8
Norway (Mellemseter)	0	1	1	0	2	0	0	0	0	0	4

Sheet D	1	2	3	4	5	6	7	8	9	10	Final
China (Wang) 🔨	0	0	1	0	2	0	1	0	0	X	4
Scotland (Gray)	0	1	0	2	0	1	0	3	2	X	9

Sheet E	1	2	3	4	5	6	7	8	9	10	Final
Czech Republic (Bares)	0	0	1	0	0	0	0	0	1	0	2
Germany (Neuner) 🔨	0	0	0	1	0	0	1	1	0	1	4

==== Draw 6 ====
Tuesday, March 6, 18:00

Sheet A	1	2	3	4	5	6	7	8	9	10	Final
Czech Republic (Bares)	0	0	1	0	2	0	0	0	1	0	4
Scotland (Gray) 🔨	2	0	0	2	0	1	0	0	0	1	6

Sheet B	1	2	3	4	5	6	7	8	9	10	Final
Germany (Neuner) 🔨	1	0	0	2	0	0	1	0	3	0	7
Norway (Mellemseter)	0	0	1	0	2	2	0	3	0	3	11

Sheet C	1	2	3	4	5	6	7	8	9	10	Final
Switzerland (von Gunten) 🔨	3	0	0	0	2	0	2	0	2	1	10
China (Wang)	0	0	1	2	0	2	0	1	0	0	6

Sheet D	1	2	3	4	5	6	7	8	9	10	Final
United States (Plys)	0	2	0	2	0	0	0	1	0	2	7
Denmark (Stjerne) 🔨	1	0	2	0	0	0	2	0	1	0	6

Sheet E	1	2	3	4	5	6	7	8	9	10	Final
Sweden (Edin) 🔨	2	1	0	0	0	1	0	0	X	X	4
Canada (Thomas)	0	0	1	1	2	0	2	2	X	X	8

==== Draw 7 ====
Wednesday, March 7, 14:00

Sheet A	1	2	3	4	5	6	7	8	9	10	Final
China (Wang) 🔨	0	0	2	0	0	0	1	0	2	0	5
Germany (Neuner)	0	0	0	2	0	1	0	2	0	1	6

Sheet B	1	2	3	4	5	6	7	8	9	10	Final
Czech Republic (Bares) 🔨	0	0	0	1	0	0	1	0	1	X	3
Sweden (Edin)	2	2	1	0	0	1	0	1	0	X	7

Sheet C	1	2	3	4	5	6	7	8	9	10	11	Final
Scotland (Gray)	1	0	1	0	1	0	0	1	0	1	1	6
United States (Plys) 🔨	0	1	0	2	0	0	1	0	1	0	0	5

Sheet D	1	2	3	4	5	6	7	8	9	10	Final
Canada (Thomas) 🔨	0	2	0	3	0	1	0	2	2	1	11
Switzerland (von Gunten)	0	0	1	0	1	0	2	0	0	0	4

Sheet E	1	2	3	4	5	6	7	8	9	10	Final
Norway (Mellemseter) 🔨	0	0	1	0	0	0	0	1	X	X	2
Denmark (Stjerne)	0	0	0	2	2	1	2	0	X	X	7

==== Draw 8 ====
Thursday, March 8, 8:00

Sheet A	1	2	3	4	5	6	7	8	9	10	Final
Switzerland (von Gunten)	0	1	0	2	2	2	0	2	0	1	10
Norway (Mellemseter) 🔨	1	0	2	0	0	0	3	0	3	0	9

Sheet B	1	2	3	4	5	6	7	8	9	10	Final
Scotland (Gray) 🔨	0	0	1	0	0	0	2	0	1	0	4
Canada (Thomas)	0	0	0	2	0	0	0	1	0	2	5

Sheet C	1	2	3	4	5	6	7	8	9	10	Final
Czech Republic (Bares) 🔨	1	0	1	0	2	0	1	1	X	X	6
Denmark (Stjerne)	0	5	0	3	0	3	0	0	X	X	11

Sheet D	1	2	3	4	5	6	7	8	9	10	Final
Sweden (Edin) 🔨	1	1	0	1	1	0	0	0	1	2	7
China (Wang)	0	0	1	0	0	0	1	1	0	0	3

Sheet E	1	2	3	4	5	6	7	8	9	10	Final
Germany (Neuner) 🔨	1	0	0	0	2	0	0	1	0	X	4
United States (Plys)	0	3	1	1	0	2	1	0	1	X	9

==== Draw 9 ====
Thursday, March 8, 17:00

Sheet A	1	2	3	4	5	6	7	8	9	10	Final
Scotland (Gray)	0	0	0	0	1	0	1	0	2	1	5
Denmark (Stjerne) 🔨	0	0	0	2	0	2	0	3	0	0	7

Sheet B	1	2	3	4	5	6	7	8	9	10	Final
Norway (Mellemseter)	0	2	0	1	0	1	0	2	0	1	7
China (Wang) 🔨	1	0	2	0	1	0	1	0	1	0	6

Sheet C	1	2	3	4	5	6	7	8	9	10	Final
Canada (Thomas) 🔨	2	1	1	0	5	0	2	X	X	X	11
Germany (Neuner)	0	0	0	1	0	1	0	X	X	X	2

Sheet D	1	2	3	4	5	6	7	8	9	10	Final
Czech Republic (Bares)	0	0	0	1	0	0	1	0	1	X	3
United States (Plys) 🔨	0	3	0	0	1	1	0	2	0	X	7

Sheet E	1	2	3	4	5	6	7	8	9	10	Final
Switzerland (von Gunten) 🔨	0	1	1	0	2	0	1	0	0	1	6
Sweden (Edin)	0	0	0	0	0	1	0	1	1	0	3

=== Tiebreaker ===
Friday, March 9, 14:00

Sheet E	1	2	3	4	5	6	7	8	9	10	Final
United States (Plys) 🔨	0	0	0	1	0	0	0	1	0	X	2
Denmark (Stjerne)	0	1	2	0	0	1	1	0	1	X	6

=== Playoffs ===
Semifinals
1	Canada	8
4	Denmark	2
2	Switzerland	3
3	Sweden	11

Final
1	Canada	8
3	Sweden	3
Bronze-medal game
2	Switzerland	7
4	Denmark	6

==== Semifinals ====
Saturday, March 10, 14:00

Sheet D	1	2	3	4	5	6	7	8	9	10	Final
Canada (Thomas) 🔨	0	1	1	0	0	3	1	1	1	X	8
Denmark (Stjerne)	0	0	0	1	1	0	0	0	0	X	2

Sheet B	1	2	3	4	5	6	7	8	9	10	Final
Switzerland (von Gunten)	0	1	0	1	0	0	1	0	X	X	3
Sweden (Edin) 🔨	2	0	4	0	1	1	0	3	X	X	11

==== Bronze-medal game ====
Sunday, March 11, 9:00

Sheet C	1	2	3	4	5	6	7	8	9	10	11	Final
Switzerland (von Gunten)	0	2	0	0	0	1	0	1	0	2	1	7
Denmark (Stjerne) 🔨	0	0	1	1	1	0	2	0	1	0	0	6

==== Gold-medal game ====
Sunday, March 11, 13:30

Sheet C	1	2	3	4	5	6	7	8	9	10	Final
Canada (Thomas) 🔨	0	2	0	1	0	3	1	1	X	X	8
Sweden (Edin)	0	0	2	0	1	0	0	0	X	X	3

== Women ==
=== Teams ===
Country	Skip	Third	Second	Lead	Alternate
Canada	Stacie Devereaux	Stephanie Guzzwell	Sarah Paul	Julie Devereaux	Stephanie Jackson
China	Sun Yue	Li Xue	Yu Xinna	Chen Yinjie	
Czech Republic	Anna Kubešková	Linda Klímová	Tereza Plíšková	Michaela Nadherová	Luisa Illková
Denmark	Madeleine Dupont	Jeanne Ellegaard	Mona Sylvest Nielsen	Ivana Bratic	Lisa Sylvest Nielsen
Italy	Giorgia Apollonio	Elettra de Col	Giulia Dal Pont	Giorgia Casagrande	Lucrezia Salvai
Norway	Kristin Moen Skaslien	Marte Bakk	Solveig Enoksen	Ingrid Stensrud	Anneline Skårsmoen
Russia	Liudmila Privivkova	Ekaterina Galkina	Margarita Fomina	Angela Tuvaeva	Daria Kozlova
Scotland	Sarah Reid	Eve Muirhead	Barbara McFarlane	Sarah MacIntyre	Alison Black
Switzerland	Sandra Zurbuchen	Martina Baumann	Franziska Kaufmann	Fabienne Kaufmann	Marlene Albrecht
United States	Aileen Sormunen	Courtney George	Molly Bonner	Jordan Moulton	Monica Walker

=== Round-robin standings ===
Final round-robin standings

Key
Teams to Playoffs
Teams to Tiebreakers

Country	Skip	W	L
United States	Aileen Sormunen	8	1
Canada	Stacie Devereaux	6	3
Denmark	Madeleine Dupont	6	3
Scotland	Sarah Reid	5	4
Switzerland	Sandra Zarbuchen	5	4
Norway	Kristin Moen Skaslien	5	4
Russia	Liudmila Privivkova	4	5
China	Sun Yue	3	6
Czech Republic	Anna Kubešková	2	7
Italy	Giorgia Apollonio	1	8

=== Round-robin results ===
==== Draw 1 ====
Saturday, March 3, 8:30

Sheet A	1	2	3	4	5	6	7	8	9	10	Final
Denmark (Dupont) 🔨	0	0	1	1	1	1	0	0	2	0	6
United States (Sormunen)	1	1	0	0	0	0	2	2	0	1	7

Sheet B	1	2	3	4	5	6	7	8	9	10	Final
Italy (Apollonio) 🔨	1	0	1	1	0	1	0	0	0	X	4
Canada (Devereaux)	0	2	0	0	1	0	2	2	1	X	8

Sheet C	1	2	3	4	5	6	7	8	9	10	Final
Norway (Skaslien)	0	1	0	0	1	1	2	0	1	0	6
Scotland (Reid) 🔨	0	0	2	1	0	0	0	1	0	3	7

Sheet D	1	2	3	4	5	6	7	8	9	10	Final
Czech Republic (Kubešková) 🔨	0	1	0	1	0	1	0	1	0	X	4
Russia (Privivkova)	0	0	1	0	3	0	2	0	2	X	8

Sheet E	1	2	3	4	5	6	7	8	9	10	11	Final
China (Sun)	0	1	2	0	0	0	1	1	1	1	0	7
Switzerland (Zurbuchen) 🔨	3	0	0	1	2	1	0	0	0	0	1	8

==== Draw 2 ====
Saturday, March 3, 19:00

Sheet A	1	2	3	4	5	6	7	8	9	10	Final
Switzerland (Zurbuchen)	0	1	1	1	0	0	1	0	0	0	4
Scotland (Reid) 🔨	1	0	0	0	2	1	0	3	1	1	9

Sheet B	1	2	3	4	5	6	7	8	9	10	Final
Denmark (Dupont) 🔨	1	0	0	1	1	1	0	4	0	1	9
Norway (Skaslien)	0	2	1	0	0	0	1	0	2	0	6

Sheet C	1	2	3	4	5	6	7	8	9	10	Final
Canada (Devereaux) 🔨	0	0	2	0	0	0	1	0	0	X	3
United States (Sormunen)	0	3	0	1	1	1	0	1	1	X	8

Sheet D	1	2	3	4	5	6	7	8	9	10	Final
Russia (Privivkova)	1	0	0	2	0	0	1	1	0	1	6
China (Sun) 🔨	0	0	1	0	1	1	0	0	1	0	4

Sheet E	1	2	3	4	5	6	7	8	9	10	Final
Czech Republic (Kubešková) 🔨	0	0	1	0	1	3	1	0	0	2	8
Italy (Apollonio)	1	0	0	1	0	0	0	1	1	0	4

==== Draw 3 ====
Sunday, March 4, 14:00

Sheet A	1	2	3	4	5	6	7	8	9	10	Final
Italy (Apollonio) 🔨	1	0	0	3	0	1	1	0	0	1	7
Denmark (Dupont)	0	0	1	0	3	0	0	1	1	0	6

Sheet B	1	2	3	4	5	6	7	8	9	10	Final
United States (Sormunen) 🔨	2	0	0	0	0	1	0	2	0	1	6
China (Sun)	0	1	0	1	0	0	1	0	1	0	4

Sheet C	1	2	3	4	5	6	7	8	9	10	Final
Czech Republic (Kubešková)	0	0	0	0	1	0	X	X	X	X	1
Switzerland (Zurbuchen) 🔨	1	1	2	3	0	2	X	X	X	X	9

Sheet D	1	2	3	4	5	6	7	8	9	10	11	Final
Norway (Skaslien) 🔨	1	0	0	0	1	1	0	1	0	2	0	6
Canada (Devereaux)	0	0	0	3	0	0	2	0	1	0	1	7

Sheet E	1	2	3	4	5	6	7	8	9	10	Final
Russia (Privivkova) 🔨	0	2	0	2	0	0	1	0	0	0	5
Scotland (Reid)	0	0	2	0	0	2	0	2	0	1	7

==== Draw 4 ====
Monday, March 5, 9:00

Sheet A	1	2	3	4	5	6	7	8	9	10	Final
China (Sun) 🔨	1	1	0	0	2	1	0	1	1	0	7
Czech Republic (Kubešková)	0	0	0	1	0	0	3	0	0	0	4

Sheet B	1	2	3	4	5	6	7	8	9	10	Final
Canada (Devereaux) 🔨	1	0	0	0	0	0	3	1	0	0	5
Russia (Privivkova)	0	2	2	2	1	1	0	0	1	1	10

Sheet C	1	2	3	4	5	6	7	8	9	10	Final
Scotland (Reid) 🔨	0	1	0	0	1	0	0	0	0	X	2
Denmark (Dupont)	0	0	1	1	0	1	1	1	2	X	7

Sheet D	1	2	3	4	5	6	7	8	9	10	Final
Italy (Apollonio)	0	1	0	0	0	1	X	X	X	X	2
Switzerland (Zurbuchen) 🔨	2	0	5	2	2	0	X	X	X	X	11

Sheet E	1	2	3	4	5	6	7	8	9	10	Final
United States (Sormunen)	0	1	1	0	0	0	1	0	0	X	3
Norway (Skaslien) 🔨	2	0	0	2	1	0	0	3	1	X	9

==== Draw 5 ====
Monday, March 5, 19:00

Sheet A	1	2	3	4	5	6	7	8	9	10	Final
Russia (Privivkova) 🔨	2	0	0	2	0	0	0	0	1	0	5
Switzerland (Zurbuchen)	0	2	0	0	1	1	1	1	0	1	7

Sheet B	1	2	3	4	5	6	7	8	9	10	Final
Norway (Skaslien)	2	0	2	0	3	2	1	0	X	X	10
Czech Republic (Kubešková) 🔨	0	2	0	2	0	0	0	1	X	X	5

Sheet C	1	2	3	4	5	6	7	8	9	10	Final
Italy (Apollonio) 🔨	0	0	0	1	0	0	0	0	X	X	1
China (Sun)	1	1	2	0	1	1	2	1	X	X	9

Sheet D	1	2	3	4	5	6	7	8	9	10	Final
Scotland (Reid)	1	0	2	0	2	0	1	0	0	X	6
United States (Sormunen) 🔨	0	4	0	1	0	4	0	1	1	X	11

Sheet E	1	2	3	4	5	6	7	8	9	10	Final
Denmark (Dupont) 🔨	0	1	3	0	0	1	0	1	0	0	6
Canada (Devereaux)	0	0	0	2	3	0	2	0	0	1	8

==== Draw 6 ====
Tuesday, March 6, 13:30

Sheet A	1	2	3	4	5	6	7	8	9	10	Final
Canada (Devereaux) 🔨	1	0	1	0	1	0	3	0	0	2	8
China (Sun)	0	1	0	2	0	1	0	2	1	0	7

Sheet B	1	2	3	4	5	6	7	8	9	10	Final
Czech Republic (Kubešková)	2	0	2	0	1	1	1	1	X	X	8
Scotland (Reid) 🔨	0	0	0	1	0	0	0	0	X	X	1

Sheet C	1	2	3	4	5	6	7	8	9	10	Final
Russia (Privivkova) 🔨	0	1	0	0	0	2	0	1	0	0	4
Norway (Skaslien)	0	0	1	2	2	0	1	0	1	1	8

Sheet D	1	2	3	4	5	6	7	8	9	10	Final
United States (Sormunen)	0	0	0	3	2	3	1	X	X	X	9
Italy (Apollonio) 🔨	0	0	1	0	0	0	0	X	X	X	1

Sheet E	1	2	3	4	5	6	7	8	9	10	Final
Switzerland (Zurbuchen) 🔨	0	0	1	0	1	0	1	0	0	1	4
Denmark (Dupont)	2	0	0	2	0	1	0	0	1	0	6

==== Draw 7 ====
Wednesday, March 7, 9:00

Sheet A	1	2	3	4	5	6	7	8	9	10	Final
Scotland (Reid)	0	1	0	2	0	1	1	0	1	X	6
Canada (Devereaux) 🔨	2	0	2	0	3	0	0	2	0	X	9

Sheet B	1	2	3	4	5	6	7	8	9	10	Final
China (Sun) 🔨	1	1	0	0	0	1	0	2	1	0	6
Denmark (Dupont)	0	0	2	2	1	0	3	0	0	0	8

Sheet C	1	2	3	4	5	6	7	8	9	10	Final
United States (Sormunen) 🔨	0	1	1	2	0	0	3	3	X	X	10
Czech Republic (Kubešková)	0	0	0	0	1	1	0	0	X	X	2

Sheet D	1	2	3	4	5	6	7	8	9	10	Final
Switzerland (Zurbuchen)	0	2	0	2	0	0	3	0	1	0	8
Norway (Skaslien) 🔨	2	0	1	0	0	1	0	1	0	4	9

Sheet E	1	2	3	4	5	6	7	8	9	10	Final
Italy (Apollonio)	0	0	0	0	0	2	0	0	X	X	2
Russia (Privivkova) 🔨	1	0	2	1	1	0	1	2	X	X	8

==== Draw 8 ====
Wednesday, March 7, 19:00

Sheet A	1	2	3	4	5	6	7	8	9	10	Final
Norway (Skaslien) 🔨	1	0	2	0	3	0	0	3	X	X	9
Italy (Apollonio)	0	1	0	1	0	1	1	0	X	X	4

Sheet B	1	2	3	4	5	6	7	8	9	10	Final
Switzerland (Zurbuchen) 🔨	1	0	1	0	1	0	0	1	0	0	4
United States (Sormunen)	0	1	0	2	0	1	1	0	1	1	7

Sheet C	1	2	3	4	5	6	7	8	9	10	Final
Denmark (Dupont)	0	0	1	0	2	0	2	0	0	2	7
Russia (Privivkova) 🔨	2	0	0	1	0	1	0	1	1	0	6

Sheet D	1	2	3	4	5	6	7	8	9	10	Final
China (Sun)	0	0	0	2	0	1	0	1	0	0	4
Scotland (Reid) 🔨	0	1	1	0	1	0	2	0	2	1	8

Sheet E	1	2	3	4	5	6	7	8	9	10	Final
Canada (Devereaux)	0	1	0	3	1	0	4	0	0	2	11
Czech Republic (Kubešková) 🔨	2	0	2	0	0	1	0	1	1	0	7

==== Draw 9 ====
Thursday, March 8, 12:30

Sheet A	1	2	3	4	5	6	7	8	9	10	Final
United States (Sormunen) 🔨	0	0	2	0	0	0	2	2	0	1	7
Russia (Privivkova)	0	1	0	0	2	3	0	0	0	0	6

Sheet B	1	2	3	4	5	6	7	8	9	10	Final
Scotland (Reid)	0	0	2	0	0	0	1	0	2	0	5
Italy (Apollonio) 🔨	1	0	0	0	0	1	0	1	0	0	3

Sheet C	1	2	3	4	5	6	7	8	9	10	Final
Switzerland (Zurbuchen)	0	0	2	0	2	2	0	4	0	X	10
Canada (Devereaux) 🔨	0	2	0	1	0	0	2	0	1	X	6

Sheet D	1	2	3	4	5	6	7	8	9	10	Final
Denmark (Dupont) 🔨	4	0	2	0	0	0	1	2	X	X	9
Czech Republic (Kubešková)	0	0	0	2	1	1	0	0	X	X	4

Sheet E	1	2	3	4	5	6	7	8	9	10	Final
Norway (Skaslien)	0	1	0	2	0	0	0	2	0	0	5
China (Sun) 🔨	1	0	1	0	2	1	0	0	1	1	7

=== Tiebreakers ===
Thursday, March 8, 21:00

Sheet A	1	2	3	4	5	6	7	8	9	10	Final
Switzerland (Zarbuchen) 🔨	2	0	0	1	1	0	0	2	0	0	6
Norway (Skaslien)	0	0	0	0	0	1	1	0	2	0	4

Friday, March 9, 9:00

Sheet E	1	2	3	4	5	6	7	8	9	10	Final
Switzerland (Zarbuchen)	0	0	2	0	0	1	0	0	2	0	5
Scotland (Reid) 🔨	1	0	0	0	4	0	1	1	0	1	8

=== Playoffs ===
Semifinals
1	United States	5
4	Scotland	6
2	Canada	10
3	Denmark	6

Gold-medal game
4	Scotland	7
2	Canada	6
Bronze-medal game
1	United States	6
3	Denmark	8

==== Semifinals ====
Friday, March 9, 19:00

Sheet D	1	2	3	4	5	6	7	8	9	10	Final
Scotland (Reid) 🔨	0	1	0	0	3	1	0	0	0	1	6
United States (Sormunen)	0	0	0	1	0	0	2	1	1	0	5

Sheet B	1	2	3	4	5	6	7	8	9	10	Final
Denmark (Dupont) 🔨	0	1	0	1	0	3	0	1	0	0	6
Canada (Devereaux)	2	0	2	0	1	0	1	0	3	1	10

==== Bronze-medal game ====
Saturday, March 10, 18:00

Sheet E	1	2	3	4	5	6	7	8	9	10	Final
Denmark (Dupont)	0	2	0	1	0	1	1	0	2	1	8
United States (Sormunen)🔨	3	0	1	0	1	0	0	1	0	0	6

==== Gold-medal game ====
Saturday, March 10, 19:00

Sheet C	1	2	3	4	5	6	7	8	9	10	11	Final
Scotland (Reid) 🔨	0	1	0	0	1	1	0	0	1	2	1	7
Canada (Devereaux)	1	0	0	3	0	0	0	2	0	0	0	6
