= Lenka Černovská =

Czech curler

- Curler ♀
- Born: 16 December 1985 (age 40)

Team
- Curling club: CC Dion, Prague, CC Zbraslav, Zbraslav, CZE

Curling career
- Member Association: Czech Republic
- World Championship: 2 (2008, 2012)
- European Championship: 3 (2007, 2008, 2011)
- Other appearances: European Mixed Championship: (2010), European Junior Challenge: 1 (2006)
Medal record
Curling

Lenka Černovská (born 16 December 1985) is a Czech curler.

== Teams ==
=== Women's ===
Season	Skip	Third	Second	Lead	Alternate	Coach	Events
2005–06	Kamila Mošová	Lenka Černovská	Linda Klímová	Anna Kubešková	Tereza Plíšková	Jana Linhartová	EJCC 2006 (5th)
2007–08	Kateřina Urbanová (fourth)	Lenka Černovská (skip)	Jana Šafaříková	Dana Chabičovská (ECC); Sára Jahodová (WCC)	Sára Jahodová (ECC); Jana Šimmerová (WCC)	Vlastimil Vojtus	ECC 2007 (8th); WCC 2008 (12th)
2008–09	Kateřina Urbanová	Lenka Černovská	Jana Šafaříková	Jana Šimmerová	Zuzana Hájková (ECC)	Edward Dezura	ECC 2008 (10th)
2009–10	Linda Klímová	Lenka Černovská	Kamila Mošová	Kateřina Urbanová			
2010–11	Linda Klímová	Lenka Černovská	Kamila Mošová	Sára Jahodová			
2011–12	Linda Klímová	Kamila Mošová	Lenka Černovská	Kateřina Urbanová	Paula Prokšíková (ECC); Sára Jahodová (WCC)	Vladimir Cernovsky	ECC 2011 (8th); WCC 2012 (12th)

=== Mixed ===
Season	Skip	Third	Second	Lead	Alternate	Events
2010–11	Radek Boháč	Sára Jahodová	Petr Horák	Klára Boušková	Lenka Černovská, Marek Černovský	EMxCC 2010 (11th)
