= 2022 Czech Women's Curling Championship =

- Host city: Prague
- Dates: 3–8 March 2022
- Winner: Liboc 3 (Alžběta Baudyšová)
- Skip: Alžběta Baudyšová
- Fourth: Anna Kubešková
- Third: Ežen Kolčevská
- Lead: Michaela Baudyšová
- Alternate: Klára Svatoňová, Petra Vinšová
- Coach: Karel Kubeška
- Finalist: Savona H (Hana Synáčková)

The 2022 Czech Women's Curling Championship (Czech: MČR žen 2022) was held in Prague from March 3 to 8, 2022.

Four teams took part in the championship.

The team "Liboc 3" skipped this time by Alžběta Baudyšová won the championship (Baudyšová won her seventh title as player and first as skip).

The 2022 Czech Men's Curling Championship was held simultaneously with this championship at the same arena.

== Teams ==
Team	Skip	Third	Second	Lead	Alternate	Coach
Ledolamky	Karolína Špundová	Zuzana Pražáková	Denisa Poštová	Andrea Krupanská	Kristina Podrábská, Ema Kotková	Marek Černovský
Liboc 3	Anna Kubešková (fourth)	Ežen Kolčevská	Alžběta Baudyšová (skip)	Michaela Baudyšová	Klára Svatoňová, Petra Vinšová	Karel Kubeška
Savona H	Hana Synáčková	Martina Strnadová	Eliška Srnská	Karolína Frederiksen	Linda Klímová	
Savona M	Sabina Horská (fourth)	Jana Načeradská	Eliška Soukupová	Lenka Hronová (skip)	Eva Miklíková, Iveta Janatová, Markéta Taberyová	

== Round robin ==
Three best teams to playoffs: first team to final "best of 3" series, 2nd and 3rd teams to semifinal.

	Team	A1	A2	A3	A4	Wins	Losses	Place
1	Ledolamky (Karolína Špundová)	*	6:9; 6:7	4:8; 3:7	9:4; 6:3	2	4	3
2	Liboc 3 (Alžběta Baudyšová)	9:6; 7:6	*	4:10; 9:8	10:5; 9:3	5	1	1
3	Savona H (Hana Synáčková)	8:4; 7:3	10:4; 8:9	*	8:5; 8:9	4	2	2
4	Savona M (Lenka Hronová)	4:9; 3:6	5:10; 3:9	5:8; 9:8	*	1	5	4

Teams to playoffs

== Playoffs ==
Semifinal			Final
			A-1	Liboc 3 (Alžběta Baudyšová)	8	6	10
A-2	Savona H (Hana Synáčková)	8	A-2	Savona H (Hana Synáčková)	3	9	4
A-3	Ledolamky (Karolína Špundová)	5

=== Semifinal ===
6 March, 18:00 UTC+1

Sheet 2	1	2	3	4	5	6	7	8	9	10	Final
Ledolamky (Karolína Špundová)	0	0	1	0	1	0	2	0	1	X	5
Savona H (Hana Synáčková)	2	1	0	1	0	3	0	1	0	X	8

=== Final ("best of 3" series) ===
Game 1. 7 March, 11:00

Sheet 3	1	2	3	4	5	6	7	8	9	10	Final
Savona H (Hana Synáčková)	0	0	2	0	0	1	0	X	X	X	3
Liboc 3 (Alžběta Baudyšová)	1	0	0	2	1	0	4	X	X	X	8

Game 2. 7 March, 18:00

Sheet 2	1	2	3	4	5	6	7	8	9	10	Final
Liboc 3 (Alžběta Baudyšová)	0	1	0	1	0	2	0	2	0	0	6
Savona H (Hana Synáčková)	2	0	1	0	2	0	1	0	1	2	9

Game 2. 8 March, 18:00

Sheet 3	1	2	3	4	5	6	7	8	9	10	Final
Savona H (Hana Synáčková)	0	0	0	2	0	0	2	0	0	X	4
Liboc 3 (Alžběta Baudyšová)	0	3	2	0	0	3	0	1	1	X	10

== Final standings ==
Place	Team	Skip	Games	Wins	Losses
1st place, gold medalist(s)	Liboc 3	Alžběta Baudyšová	9	7	2
2nd place, silver medalist(s)	Savona H	Hana Synáčková	10	6	4
3rd place, bronze medalist(s)	Ledolamky	Karolína Špundová	7	2	5
4	Savona M	Lenka Hronová	6	1	5

== See also ==
- 2022 Czech Men's Curling Championship
- 2022 Czech Mixed Doubles Curling Championship
