= 2019 Czech Women's Curling Championship =

- Host city: Prague
- Dates: April 4–8, 2019
- Winner: Liboc 3 (Anna Kubešková)
- Finalist: Zbraslav W (Zuzana Paulová)

The 2019 Czech Women's Curling Championship (Czech: Finálový turnaj MČR 2018/19 – ženy) was held in Prague from April 4 to 8, 2019.

Four teams took part in the championship, with the top three promoted to the playoffs, which involved a best of three semifinal and final.

The winners of the championship were the "Liboc 3" team (skip Anna Kubešková), who beat the "Zbraslav W" team in the final (skip Zuzana Paulová). Team "Savona H" (skip Linda Klímová) won the bronze medal.

The championship team represented the Czech Republic at the 2019 European Curling Championships, where they finished in 6th place.

== Teams ==
Team	Skip	Third	Second	Lead	Alternate	Coach
Liboc 3	Anna Kubešková	Alžběta Baudyšová	Tereza Plíšková	Ežen Kolčevská	Eliška Soukupová	Karel Kubeška
Savona H	Linda Klímová	Hana Synáčková	Luisa Klímová	Karolína Frederiksen	Martina Strnadová	Radek Klíma
Savona M	Petra Vinšová (4th)	Eva Miklíková (skip)	Michaela Baudyšová	Iveta Janatová	Martina Kajanová	
Zbraslav W	Zuzana Paulová	Michaela Nádherová	Kateřina Rabochová	Kateřina Urbanová	Alena Krofiková	

== Round Robin ==
Key
Teams to Playoffs

	Team	1	2	3	4	Wins	Losses	DSC, cm	Place
1	Liboc 3 (Kubešková)	*	9:2; 6:8	9:3; 8:9	6:7; 9:11	2	4	35.5	3
2	Savona H (Klímová)	2:9; 8:6	*	2:9; 7:4	5:8; 8:7	3	3	29.6	2
3	Savona M (Miklíková)	3:9; 9:8	9:2; 4:7	*	5:7; 1:8	2	4	41.4	4
4	Zbraslav W (Paulová)	7:6; 11:9	8:5; 7:8	7:5; 8:1	*	5	1	59.9	1

== Playoffs ==
Semifinal			Final
			1	Zbraslav W (Paulová)	6	5	–
2	Savona H (Klímová)	6	3	Liboc 3 (Kubešková)	7	6	–
3	Liboc 3 (Kubešková)	9

=== Semifinal ===
April 7, 16:00 UTC+1

Team	1	2	3	4	5	6	7	8	9	10	Final
Liboc 3 (Kubešková)	0	1	0	2	0	2	0	2	2	X	9
Savona H (Klímová) 🔨	0	0	2	0	1	0	3	0	0	X	6

=== Final 1 ===
April 8, 10:00 UTC+1

Sheet	1	2	3	4	5	6	7	8	9	10	11	Final
Liboc 3 (Kubešková)	0	3	0	0	2	0	1	0	0	0	1	7
Zbraslav W (Paulová) 🔨	1	0	1	0	0	2	0	1	0	1	0	6

=== Final 2 ===
April 8, 16:00 UTC+1

Sheet	1	2	3	4	5	6	7	8	9	10	Final
Zbraslav W (Paulová)	0	0	0	0	1	0	1	0	3	0	5
Liboc 3 (Kubešková) 🔨	0	1	1	1	0	0	0	2	0	1	6

== Final standings ==
Place	Team	Skip	Games	Wins	Losses	DSC, cm
1st place, gold medalist(s)	Liboc 3	Anna Kubešková	8	4	4	
2nd place, silver medalist(s)	Zbraslav W	Zuzana Paulová	7	5	2	
3rd place, bronze medalist(s)	Savona H	Linda Klímová	7	3	4	
4	Savona M	Eva Miklíková	6	2	4	41.4

== See also ==
- 2019 Czech Mixed Doubles Curling Championship
