= Eliška Jalovcová =

Czech curler

- Curler ♀
- Born: 26 July 1989 (age 37)

Team
- Curling club: CC Artima, Prague

Curling career
- Member Association: Czech Republic
- World Championship: 1 (2011)
- European Championship: 1 (2010)
- Other appearances: European Mixed Championship: (2011), Winter Universiade: 1 (2011), World Junior Championships: 2 (2009, 2011), European Junior Challenge: 1 (2009)
Medal record
Curling
European Mixed Championship
Bronze medal – third place	2011 Tårnby
Czech Women's Championship
Gold medal – first place	2010
Silver medal – second place	2009
European Junior Challenge
Silver medal – second place	2009 Copenhagen

Eliška Jalovcová (born 26 July 1989) is a Czech curler.

== Teams ==
=== Women's ===
Season	Skip	Third	Second	Lead	Alternate	Coach	Events
2008–09	Anna Kubešková	Linda Klímová	Tereza Plíšková	Eliška Jalovcová	Martina Strnadová	Jiří Candra	EJCC 2009 (silver); WJCC 2009 (7th)
2008–09	Anna Kubešková	Tereza Plíšková	Luisa Illková	Eliška Jalovcová	Veronika Herdová	Karel Kubeška	CWCC 2009 (silver)
2009–10	Anna Kubešková	Tereza Plíšková	Luisa Illková	Eliška Jalovcová		Karel Kubeška	CWCC 2010 (gold)
2010–11	Anna Kubešková	Tereza Plíšková	Veronika Herdová	Eliška Jalovcová	Luisa Illková	Karel Kubeška	ECC 2010 (11th)
2010–11	Anna Kubešková	Linda Klímová	Tereza Plíšková	Eliška Jalovcová	Kamila Mošová	Karel Kubeška	WUG 2011 (7th)
2010–11	Anna Kubešková	Tereza Plíšková	Paula Prokšíková	Eliška Jalovcová	Martina Strnadová	Karel Kubeška	WJCC 2011 (9th)
2010–11	Anna Kubešková	Tereza Plíšková	Luisa Illková	Eliška Jalovcová	Veronika Herdová	Karel Kubeška	WCC 2011 (12th)

=== Mixed ===
Season	Skip	Third	Second	Lead	Alternate	Coach	Events
2010–11	Kryštof Chaloupek	Eliška Jalovcová	David Jirounek	Luisa Illková	Tomáš Paul	Anna Kubešková	CMxCC 2011 (gold)
2011–12	Kryštof Chaloupek	Eliška Jalovcová	David Jirounek	Luisa Illková	Tomáš Paul	Karel Kubeška	EMxCC 2011 (bronze)
2012–13	Jiří Marša	Eliška Jalovcová	Jaroslav Vedral	Luisa Illková			CMxCC 2013 (bronze)

== Personal life ==
She started curling in 2002.
