= Kamila Mulačová =

Czech curler

- Curler ♀
- Born: Kamila Mošová; 5 February 1987
- Died: 23 January 2019

Team
- Curling club: CC Zbraslav, Zbraslav, CZE

Curling career
- Member Association: Czech Republic
- World Championship: 1 (2012)
- European Championship: 5 (2005, 2011, 2012, 2014)
- Other appearances: World Mixed Championship: (2015), Winter Universiade: 2 (2009, 2011), European Junior Challenge: 2 (2006, 2008)
Medal record
Curling
European Junior Challenge
Bronze medal – third place	2008 Prague

Kamila Mulačová (née Mošová; 5 February 1987–23 January 2019) was a Czech curler.

== Teams ==
=== Women's ===
Season	Skip	Third	Second	Lead	Alternate	Coach	Events
2005–06	Hana Synáčková	Lenka Danielisová	Lenka Kučerová	Karolina Pilařová	Kamila Mošová		ECC 2005 (12th)
2005–06	Kamila Mošová	Lenka Černovská	Linda Klímová	Anna Kubešková	Tereza Plíšková	Jana Linhartová	EJCC 2006 (5th)
2007–08	Anna Kubešková	Linda Klímová	Tereza Plíšková	Michaela Nadherová	Kamila Mošová	Jirí Snítil	EJCC 2008 (bronze)
2009	Sárka Doudová	Kamila Mošová	Lenka Kučerová	Luisa Illková	Eva Štampachová	Karel Kubeška	WUG 2009 (5th)
2009–10	Linda Klímová	Lenka Černovská	Kamila Mošová	Kateřina Urbanová			
2010–11	Linda Klímová	Lenka Černovská	Kamila Mošová	Sára Jahodová			
2010–11	Anna Kubešková	Linda Klímová	Tereza Plíšková	Eliška Jalovcová	Kamila Mošová	Karel Kubeška	WUG 2011 (7th)
2011–12	Linda Klímová	Kamila Mošová	Lenka Černovská	Kateřina Urbanová	Paula Prokšíková (ECC); Sára Jahodová (WCC)	Vladimir Cernovsky	ECC 2011 (8th); WCC 2012 (12th)
2012–13	Linda Klímová	Kamila Mošová	Anna Kubešková	Kateřina Urbanová	Tereza Plíšková	Karel Kubeška, Daniel Rafael	ECC 2012 (8th)
2012–13	Linda Klímová	Kamila Mošová	Paula Proksikova	Kateřina Urbanová			
2013–14	Linda Klímová	Kamila Mošová	Paula Proksikova	Kateřina Urbanová			
2014–15	Linda Klímová	Kamila Mulačová	Kateřina Urbanová	Kateřina Samueliová	Zuzana Hájková	David Šik	ECC 2014 (10th)

=== Mixed ===
Season	Skip	Third	Second	Lead	Events
2015–16	Tomas Valek	Kamila Mulačová	Martin Mulač	Helena Hájková	WMxCC 2015 (19th)

== Personal life ==
In 2014, she married fellow curler Martin Mulač and changed her surname to Mulačová. They played together at the 2015 World Mixed Curling Championship.
