= Linda Klímová =

Czech curler

- Curler ♀
- Born: 14 April 1988 (age 38)

Team
- Curling club: CC Zbraslav, Zbraslav, CZE

Curling career
- Member Association: Czech Republic
- World Championship: 1 (2012)
- European Championship: 3 (2011, 2012, 2014)
- Other appearances: World Junior Championships: 2 (2007, 2009), Winter Universiade: 1 (2011), European Junior Challenge: 4 (2006, 2007, 2008, 2009)
Medal record
Curling
European Junior Challenge
Silver medal – second place	2007 Copenhagen
Silver medal – second place	2009 Copenhagen
Bronze medal – third place	2008 Prague
Czech Women's Championship
Gold medal – first place	2014
Gold medal – first place	2012
Gold medal – first place	2011
Silver medal – second place	2023
Silver medal – second place	2022
Silver medal – second place	2013
Silver medal – second place	2010
Bronze medal – third place	2019
Bronze medal – third place	2017
Bronze medal – third place	2015
Bronze medal – third place	2008

Linda Klímová (born 14 April 1988) is a Czech curler.

== Teams ==
=== Women's ===
Season	Skip	Third	Second	Lead	Alternate	Coach	Events
2005–06	Kamila Mošová	Lenka Černovská	Linda Klímová	Anna Kubešková	Tereza Plíšková	Jana Linhartová	EJCC 2006 (5th)
2006–07	Anna Kubešková	Linda Klímová	Tereza Plíšková	Michaela Nadherová	Luisa Illková	Jiří Snítil	EJCC 2007 (silver); WJCC 2007 (9th)
2007–08	Anna Kubešková	Linda Klímová	Tereza Plíšková	Michaela Nadherová	Kamila Mošová	Jiří Snítil	EJCC 2008 (bronze)
2008–09	Anna Kubešková	Linda Klímová	Tereza Plíšková	Eliška Jalovcová	Martina Strnadová	Jiří Candra	EJCC 2009 (silver); WJCC 2009 (7th)
2009–10	Linda Klímová	Lenka Černovská	Kamila Mošová	Kateřina Urbanová			
2010–11	Linda Klímová	Lenka Černovská	Kamila Mošová	Sára Jahodová			
2010–11	Anna Kubešková	Linda Klímová	Tereza Plíšková	Eliška Jalovcová	Kamila Mošová	Karel Kubeška	WUG 2011 (7th)
2011–12	Linda Klímová	Kamila Mošová	Lenka Černovská	Kateřina Urbanová	Paula Proksikova (ECC); Sára Jahodová (WCC)	Vladimir Cernovsky	ECC 2011 (8th); WCC 2012 (12th)
2012–13	Linda Klímová	Kamila Mošová	Anna Kubešková	Kateřina Urbanová	Tereza Plíšková	Karel Kubeška, Daniel Rafael	ECC 2012 (8th)
2012–13	Linda Klímová	Kamila Mošová	Paula Proksikova	Kateřina Urbanová			
2013–14	Linda Klímová	Kamila Mošová	Paula Proksikova	Kateřina Urbanová			
2014–15	Linda Klímová	Kamila Mulačová	Kateřina Urbanová	Kateřina Samueliová	Zuzana Hájková	David Šik	ECC 2014 (10th)
2018–19	Linda Klímová	Hana Synáčková	Luisa Klímová	Karolína Frederiksen	Martina Strnadová	Radek Klíma	CWCC 2019 (bronze)
2021–22	Hana Synáčková	Martina Strnadová	Eliška Srnská	Karolína Frederiksen	Linda Klímová		CWCC 2022 (silver)

=== Mixed doubles ===
Season	Female	Male	Events
2018–19	Linda Klímová	Jakub Bareš	CMDCC 2019 (4th)

== Personal life ==
Klímová is from a family of Czech curlers. Her father is curler and coach Radek Klima, her brother is Lukáš Klíma and her uncle (Radek's brother) is Tomas Klima

She started curing in 2004 at the age of 16.
