= Curling at the 2009 Winter Universiade =

2009 Winter Universiade
- Host city: Harbin, China
- Arena: Heilongjiang Skating Gym
- Dates: February 18–27
- Men's winner: Sweden
- Curling club: Karlstads CK, Karlstad
- Skip: Niklas Edin
- Third: Sebastian Kraupp
- Second: Fredrik Lindberg
- Lead: Viktor Kjäll
- Finalist: Norway (Thomas Løvold)
- Women's winner: China
- Skip: Wang Bingyu
- Third: Liu Yin
- Second: Yue Qingshuang
- Lead: Zhou Yan
- Alternate: Liu Jinli
- Finalist: Canada (Hollie Nicol)

Curling at the 2009 Winter Universiade took place from February 18 to 27 at the Heilongjiang Skating Gym in Harbin, China.

== Qualification ==
WCF announced a new qualification system for member associations into the 2009 Winter Universiade. Points shall be awarded, commencing with 2007 Winter Universiade in Turin, Italy, and continuing through the World Junior Curling Championships (men's and women's) and World Curling Championships (men's and women's).

=== Men ===
Country	2007 WJCC	2007 WMCC	2008 WJCC	2008 WMCC	Points
China	2	0	3	9	14
Canada	12	14	8	14	48
Sweden	10	8	10	3	31
Switzerland	8	9	6	2	25
Denmark	7	3.5	4.5	4	19
United States	6	10	12	6	34
Great Britain	5	3.5	2	12	22.5
Norway	4	3.5	7	10	24.5
Germany	3	12	4.5	5	24.5
Czech Republic	1	-	1	1	3
Finland	0	6.5	-	-	6.5
France	0	6.5	-	8	14.5
Australia	0	3.5	-	7	10.5
South Korea	0	1	-	-	1

=== Women ===
Country	2007 WJCC	2007 WWCC	2008 WJCC	2008 WWCC	Points
China	3	6	-	12	21
Canada	10	14	8	14	46
Sweden	-	7	10	7	24
Switzerland	6	8	5	10	29
Denmark	8	12	6	8	34
United States	7	9	3	6	25
Great Britain	12	10	12	3	37
Norway	5	-	3	-	8
Germany	-	4	1	4	9
Czech Republic	2	2	-	1	5
Russia	4	4	7	5	20
Japan	-	4	3	9	16
Italy	1	1	-	2	4

== Men ==
=== Teams ===
Canada	China	Finland	Great Britain	Japan
Skip: Mike Anderson; Third: William Francis; Second: Paul Arkilander; Lead: Matt Mapletoft; Alternate: Scott McGregor	Skip: Wang Fengchun; Third: Liu Rui; Second: Xu Xiaoming; Lead: Zang Jialiang; Alternate: Chen Lu'an	Skip: Jani Sullanmaa; Third: Jere Sullanmaa; Second: Riku Harjula; Lead: Toni Sepperi; Alternate: Leo Mäkelä	Skip: John Hamilton; Third: Andrew Craigie; Second: Tom Pendreigh Jr. Lead: Michael Goodfellow; Alternate: Ian Copland	Skip: Naoki Iwanaga; Third: Shinichiro Ishihara; Second: Jumpei Kanda; Lead: Shota Iino; Alternate: Shotaro Hashimoto
Norway	South Korea	Sweden	Switzerland	United States
Skip: Thomas Løvold; Third: Christoffer Svae; Second: Hans Tømmervold; Lead: Anders Bjørgum	Skip: Kim Chang-min; Third: Kim Min-chan; Second: Lim Myung-sup; Lead: Seong Se-hyeon; Alternate: Seo Young-seon	Karlstads CK, Karlstad Skip: Niklas Edin; Third: Sebastian Kraupp; Second: Fredrik Lindberg; Lead: Viktor Kjäll	Skip: Pascal Hess; Third: Yves Hess; Second: Florian Zürrer; Lead: Felix Attinger; Alternate: Florian Meister	Skip: Christopher Pleasants; Third: Zachary Radmer; Second: Jonathan Chartrand; Lead: Bret Nordlund; Alternate: Cory Yalowicki

=== Round-robin standings ===
Key
Teams to Playoffs
Teams to Tiebreaker

Country	Skip	W	L
Sweden	Niklas Edin	8	1
Norway	Thomas Løvold	7	2
South Korea	Kim Chang-min	6	3
China	Wang Fengchun	6	3
Switzerland	Pascal Hess	6	3
Canada	Mike Anderson	4	5
Great Britain	John Hamilton	3	6
United States	Christopher Pleasants	2	7
Finland	Jani Sullanmaa	2	7
Japan	Naoki Iwanaga	1	8

=== Round-robin results ===
==== Draw 1 ====
Thursday, February 19, 14:00

Sheet A	1	2	3	4	5	6	7	8	9	10	11	Final
United States (Pleasants)	0	0	0	0	1	0	1	1	1	1	0	5
Great Britain (Hamilton) 🔨	3	0	0	0	0	2	0	0	0	0	1	6

Sheet B	1	2	3	4	5	6	7	8	9	10	Final
Sweden (Edin) 🔨	1	0	4	0	0	0	2	0	1	X	8
Canada (Anderson)	0	1	0	1	1	1	0	1	0	X	5

Sheet C	1	2	3	4	5	6	7	8	9	10	Final
South Korea (Kim) 🔨	0	0	0	0	0	0	2	1	0	1	4
Switzerland (Hess)	0	0	0	1	1	1	0	0	0	0	3

Sheet D	1	2	3	4	5	6	7	8	9	10	Final
China (Wang) 🔨	2	2	1	1	0	1	0	3	X	X	10
Japan (Iwanaga)	0	0	0	0	1	0	1	0	X	X	2

Sheet E	1	2	3	4	5	6	7	8	9	10	Final
Norway (Løvold) 🔨	4	0	2	0	3	2	X	X	X	X	11
Finland (Sullanmaa)	0	0	0	1	0	0	X	X	X	X	1

==== Draw 2 ====
Friday, February 20, 9:00

Sheet A	1	2	3	4	5	6	7	8	9	10	Final
Norway (Løvold) 🔨	0	1	0	1	0	0	1	0	1	X	4
Sweden (Edin)	1	0	1	0	2	2	0	1	0	X	7

Sheet B	1	2	3	4	5	6	7	8	9	10	Final
Switzerland (Hess) 🔨	1	0	0	1	0	3	0	1	2	X	8
Finland (Sullanmaa)	0	0	1	0	1	0	1	0	0	X	3

Sheet C	1	2	3	4	5	6	7	8	9	10	Final
United States (Pleasants)	0	1	0	1	1	0	0	1	1	0	5
China (Wang) 🔨	1	0	2	0	0	1	1	0	0	1	6

Sheet D	1	2	3	4	5	6	7	8	9	10	Final
South Korea (Kim)	0	2	3	1	0	1	1	0	1	X	9
Great Britain (Hamilton) 🔨	1	0	0	0	2	0	0	1	0	X	4

Sheet E	1	2	3	4	5	6	7	8	9	10	Final
Canada (Anderson) 🔨	0	1	0	0	2	0	2	2	0	2	9
Japan (Iwanaga)	1	0	0	3	0	2	0	0	2	0	8

==== Draw 3 ====
Friday, February 20, 19:00

Sheet A	1	2	3	4	5	6	7	8	9	10	11	Final
Japan (Iwanaga) 🔨	0	0	0	1	0	1	0	1	0	3	0	6
Finland (Sullanmaa)	2	0	1	0	0	0	3	0	0	0	2	8

Sheet B	1	2	3	4	5	6	7	8	9	10	Final
Great Britain (Hamilton) 🔨	0	0	0	0	1	0	0	1	0	X	2
China (Wang)	0	0	1	0	0	2	3	0	1	X	7

Sheet C	1	2	3	4	5	6	7	8	9	10	Final
Canada (Anderson) 🔨	1	1	0	4	0	0	4	X	X	X	10
Norway (Løvold)	0	0	1	0	0	1	0	X	X	X	2

Sheet D	1	2	3	4	5	6	7	8	9	10	11	Final
Switzerland (Hess)	1	0	2	0	1	0	1	1	0	0	1	7
United States (Pleasants) 🔨	0	1	0	1	0	1	0	0	2	1	0	6

Sheet E	1	2	3	4	5	6	7	8	9	10	Final
South Korea (Kim) 🔨	0	1	0	0	0	1	0	2	2	0	6
Sweden (Edin)	0	0	0	3	2	0	3	0	0	1	9

==== Draw 4 ====
Saturday, February 21, 14:00

Sheet A	1	2	3	4	5	6	7	8	9	10	11	Final
Great Britain (Hamilton) 🔨	1	0	0	0	0	1	1	2	0	2	0	7
Canada (Anderson)	0	1	2	1	2	0	0	0	1	0	1	8

Sheet B	1	2	3	4	5	6	7	8	9	10	Final
South Korea (Kim) 🔨	0	2	0	2	0	0	3	1	0	X	8
United States (Pleasants)	1	0	2	0	1	0	0	0	1	X	5

Sheet C	1	2	3	4	5	6	7	8	9	10	Final
Sweden (Edin)	0	0	0	3	3	1	0	0	1	X	8
Finland (Sullanmaa) 🔨	2	0	1	0	0	0	0	2	0	X	5

Sheet D	1	2	3	4	5	6	7	8	9	10	Final
Japan (Iwanaga) 🔨	1	0	0	1	0	1	0	1	0	X	4
Norway (Løvold)	0	2	0	0	2	0	0	0	3	X	7

Sheet E	1	2	3	4	5	6	7	8	9	10	Final
China (Wang) 🔨	0	2	0	2	0	2	0	0	3	X	9
Switzerland (Hess)	0	0	2	0	1	0	1	1	0	X	5

==== Draw 5 ====
Sunday, February 22, 9:00

Sheet A	1	2	3	4	5	6	7	8	9	10	Final
South Korea (Kim) 🔨	1	0	1	0	0	1	0	2	0	X	5
Norway (Løvold)	0	1	0	3	1	0	4	0	1	X	10

Sheet B	1	2	3	4	5	6	7	8	9	10	Final
Canada (Anderson) 🔨	0	2	0	0	1	0	0	1	0	X	4
Switzerland (Hess)	0	0	2	1	0	2	1	0	3	X	9

Sheet C	1	2	3	4	5	6	7	8	9	10	Final
Great Britain (Hamilton)	0	1	0	2	0	1	2	0	0	1	7
Japan (Iwanaga) 🔨	1	0	1	0	2	0	0	1	1	0	6

Sheet D	1	2	3	4	5	6	7	8	9	10	Final
Sweden (Edin) 🔨	2	1	0	0	0	1	1	1	1	X	7
China (Wang)	0	0	2	2	0	0	0	0	0	X	4

Sheet E	1	2	3	4	5	6	7	8	9	10	Final
Finland (Sullanmaa) 🔨	0	0	1	0	2	0	1	0	X	X	4
United States (Pleasants)	2	1	0	3	0	1	0	5	X	X	12

==== Draw 6 ====
Sunday, February 22, 19:00

Sheet A	1	2	3	4	5	6	7	8	9	10	Final
Finland (Sullanmaa)	0	0	0	0	0	0	1	X	X	X	1
China (Wang) 🔨	1	1	2	1	4	0	0	X	X	X	9

Sheet B	1	2	3	4	5	6	7	8	9	10	Final
United States (Pleasants)	3	0	0	1	0	0	2	0	3	X	9
Japan (Iwanaga) 🔨	0	2	0	0	2	0	0	1	0	X	5

Sheet C	1	2	3	4	5	6	7	8	9	10	Final
Switzerland (Hess) 🔨	1	1	0	2	0	0	1	0	0	2	7
Sweden (Edin)	0	0	1	0	0	2	0	2	1	0	6

Sheet D	1	2	3	4	5	6	7	8	9	10	Final
Canada (Anderson) 🔨	1	0	2	0	0	0	1	0	1	0	5
South Korea (Kim)	0	2	0	0	2	0	0	0	0	3	7

Sheet E	1	2	3	4	5	6	7	8	9	10	Final
Great Britain (Hamilton)	0	1	0	0	3	0	0	1	0	X	5
Norway (Løvold) 🔨	1	0	2	1	0	1	3	0	1	X	9

==== Draw 7 ====
Monday, February 23, 14:00

Sheet A	1	2	3	4	5	6	7	8	9	10	Final
Sweden (Edin) 🔨	1	1	2	1	2	0	X	X	X	X	7
United States (Pleasants)	0	0	0	0	0	0	X	X	X	X	0

Sheet B	1	2	3	4	5	6	7	8	9	10	Final
Finland (Sullanmaa)	0	2	0	2	0	0	0	X	X	X	4
Great Britain (Hamilton) 🔨	4	0	1	0	3	2	1	X	X	X	11

Sheet C	1	2	3	4	5	6	7	8	9	10	Final
China (Wang) 🔨	1	0	1	1	1	0	1	0	2	X	7
Canada (Anderson)	0	2	0	0	0	1	0	1	0	X	4

Sheet D	1	2	3	4	5	6	7	8	9	10	Final
Norway (Løvold)	0	2	0	0	0	0	0	2	0	1	5
Switzerland (Hess) 🔨	2	0	0	1	0	0	0	0	1	0	4

Sheet E	1	2	3	4	5	6	7	8	9	10	Final
Japan (Iwanaga)	1	0	2	3	1	0	0	1	1	2	11
South Korea (Kim) 🔨	0	3	0	0	0	5	0	0	0	0	8

==== Draw 8 ====
Tuesday, February 24, 9:00

Sheet A	1	2	3	4	5	6	7	8	9	10	Final
Switzerland (Hess) 🔨	2	0	4	0	0	0	1	0	1	X	8
Japan (Iwanaga)	0	3	0	1	0	0	0	1	0	X	5

Sheet B	1	2	3	4	5	6	7	8	9	10	Final
China (Wang) 🔨	0	3	0	1	0	0	1	0	0	X	5
Norway (Løvold)	1	0	3	0	3	1	0	2	1	X	11

Sheet C	1	2	3	4	5	6	7	8	9	10	Final
Finland (Sullanmaa)	0	0	1	0	1	1	0	0	1	0	4
South Korea (Kim) 🔨	3	0	0	0	0	0	1	2	0	1	7

Sheet D	1	2	3	4	5	6	7	8	9	10	Final
Great Britain (Hamilton)	1	0	0	0	2	0	0	1	1	0	5
Sweden (Edin) 🔨	0	1	1	2	0	0	2	0	0	1	7

Sheet E	1	2	3	4	5	6	7	8	9	10	Final
United States (Pleasants) 🔨	0	2	0	1	0	0	0	1	0	X	4
Canada (Anderson)	1	0	2	0	2	0	1	0	2	X	8

==== Draw 9 ====
Tuesday, February 24, 19:00

Sheet A	1	2	3	4	5	6	7	8	9	10	Final
China (Wang)	1	0	1	0	0	1	0	2	0	X	5
South Korea (Kim) 🔨	0	2	0	0	3	0	1	0	3	X	9

Sheet B	1	2	3	4	5	6	7	8	9	10	Final
Japan (Iwanaga)	0	0	0	1	0	0	0	X	X	X	1
Sweden (Edin) 🔨	0	2	2	0	0	5	2	X	X	X	11

Sheet C	1	2	3	4	5	6	7	8	9	10	11	Final
Norway (Løvold) 🔨	1	0	2	0	0	2	0	0	1	0	1	7
United States (Pleasants)	0	1	0	1	1	0	0	1	0	2	0	6

Sheet D	1	2	3	4	5	6	7	8	9	10	Final
Finland (Sullanmaa)	1	1	0	0	2	0	1	0	2	X	7
Canada (Anderson) 🔨	0	0	3	0	0	1	0	1	0	X	5

Sheet E	1	2	3	4	5	6	7	8	9	10	Final
Switzerland (Hess) 🔨	2	0	0	2	0	2	0	2	0	X	8
Great Britain (Hamilton)	0	2	0	0	1	0	1	0	1	X	5

=== Tiebreaker ===
Wednesday, February 25, 9:00

Sheet D	1	2	3	4	5	6	7	8	9	10	Final
Switzerland (Hess)	1	0	0	0	0	1	0	0	1	X	3
China (Wang) 🔨	0	0	2	1	1	0	1	0	0	X	5

=== Playoffs ===
Semifinal
1	Sweden	8
4	China	7
2	Norway	5
3	South Korea	2

Gold Medal Game
1	Sweden	8
2	Norway	7
Bronze Medal Game
4	China	9
3	South Korea	5

==== Semifinals ====
Thursday, February 26, 9:00

Sheet A	1	2	3	4	5	6	7	8	9	10	Final
Sweden (Edin) 🔨	0	3	0	1	1	0	0	1	0	2	8
China (Wang)	1	0	3	0	0	1	0	0	2	0	7

Sheet B	1	2	3	4	5	6	7	8	9	10	Final
Norway (Løvold) 🔨	0	0	0	2	0	0	2	0	1	0	5
South Korea (Kim)	0	0	0	0	1	0	0	1	0	0	2

==== Bronze Medal Game ====
Thursday, February 26, 14:00

Sheet D	1	2	3	4	5	6	7	8	9	10	Final
South Korea (Kim) 🔨	1	0	2	0	0	1	0	1	0	X	5
China (Wang)	0	2	0	0	3	0	3	0	1	X	9

==== Gold Medal Game ====
Friday, February 27, 14:00

Sheet A	1	2	3	4	5	6	7	8	9	10	11	Final
Sweden (Edin) 🔨	2	0	2	0	0	0	1	0	2	0	1	8
Norway (Løvold)	0	1	0	0	2	1	0	1	0	2	0	7

== Women ==
=== Teams ===
Canada	China	Czech Republic	Great Britain	Japan
Skip: Hollie Nicol; Third: Danielle Inglis; Second: Laura Hickey; Lead: Hilary McDermott; Alternate: Erica Butler	Skip: Wang Bingyu; Third: Liu Yin; Second: Yue Qingshuang; Lead: Zhou Yan; Alternate: Liu Jinli	Skip: Sárka Doudová; Third: Kamila Mosova; Second: Lenka Kucerova; Lead: Luisa Illkova; Alternate: Eva Stampachova	Skip: Sarah Reid; Third: Kay Adams; Second: Vicki Adams; Lead: Sarah MacIntyre; Alternate: Laura Kirkpatrick	Skip: Ayane Matsumara; Third: Shiori Fujisawa; Second: Kiiko Kawaguchi; Lead: Marina Oiwa; Alternate: Megumi Hatayama
Poland	Russia	South Korea	Sweden	United States
Skip: Maria Kluś; Third: Katarzyna Wicik; Second: Magdalena Muskus; Lead: Joanna Waryszak; Alternate: Magdalena Szyszko	Skip: Liudmila Privivkova; Third: Nkeiruka Ezekh; Second: Margarita Fomina; Lead: Ekaterina Galkina; Alternate: Ekaterina Antonova	Skip: Jeung Jin-sook; Third: Kim Ji-suk; Second: Ju Yun-hoa; Lead: Park Mi-hee; Alternate: Lee Hye-in	Skellefteå CK, Skellefteå; Karlstads CK, Karlstad Skip: Stina Viktorsson; Third: Maria Wennerström; Second: Anna Domeij; Lead: Sara Carlsson	Skip: Katherine Stewart; Third: Amanda McLean; Second: Casey Cucchiarelli; Lead: Sara McLeod

=== Round-robin standings ===
Key
Teams to Playoffs
Teams to Tiebreaker

Country	Skip	W	L
Canada	Hollie Nicol	9	0
China	Wang Bingyu	7	2
Russia	Liudmila Privivkova	6	3
Great Britain	Sarah Reid	5	4
Czech Republic	Sárka Doudová	5	4
Sweden	Stina Viktorsson	4	5
South Korea	Jeung Jin-sook	3	6
Japan	Ayane Matsumara	3	6
United States	Katherine Stewart	2	7
Poland	Maria Kluś	1	8

=== Round-robin results ===
==== Draw 1 ====
Thursday, February 19, 9:00

Sheet A	1	2	3	4	5	6	7	8	9	10	11	Final
Canada (Nicol) 🔨	1	0	0	1	0	2	3	1	0	1	4	13
Russia (Privivkova)	0	3	1	0	2	0	0	0	3	0	0	9

Sheet B	1	2	3	4	5	6	7	8	9	10	Final
China (Wang)	0	1	4	0	1	3	2	X	X	X	11
Great Britain (Reid) 🔨	1	0	0	2	0	0	0	X	X	X	3

Sheet C	1	2	3	4	5	6	7	8	9	10	Final
Sweden (Viktorsson) 🔨	0	5	2	2	0	2	0	0	2	X	13
Japan (Matsumara)	2	0	0	0	1	0	1	2	0	X	6

Sheet D	1	2	3	4	5	6	7	8	9	10	Final
United States (Stewart)	0	0	0	0	0	1	0	X	X	X	1
South Korea (Jeung) 🔨	2	2	2	2	1	0	3	X	X	X	12

Sheet E	1	2	3	4	5	6	7	8	9	10	Final
Czech Republic (Doudová) 🔨	0	1	0	4	0	2	0	1	2	X	10
Poland (Kluś)	1	0	1	0	1	0	2	0	0	X	5

==== Draw 2 ====
Thursday, February 19, 19:00

Sheet A	1	2	3	4	5	6	7	8	9	10	Final
Czech Republic (Doudová) 🔨	1	0	0	1	0	0	0	X	X	X	2
China (Wang)	0	2	3	0	1	1	2	X	X	X	9

Sheet B	1	2	3	4	5	6	7	8	9	10	Final
Japan (Matsumara)	0	0	1	0	0	2	1	0	1	0	5
Poland (Kluś) 🔨	3	1	0	1	1	0	0	1	0	1	8

Sheet C	1	2	3	4	5	6	7	8	9	10	Final
Canada (Nicol) 🔨	0	1	0	0	4	0	0	4	4	X	13
United States (Stewart)	0	0	0	2	0	1	0	0	0	X	3

Sheet D	1	2	3	4	5	6	7	8	9	10	Final
Sweden (Viktorsson)	0	0	1	0	0	1	0	0	2	0	4
Russia (Privivkova) 🔨	1	0	0	1	1	0	2	1	0	2	8

Sheet E	1	2	3	4	5	6	7	8	9	10	Final
Great Britain (Reid) 🔨	2	2	0	0	0	2	0	0	3	X	9
South Korea (Jeung)	0	0	1	0	0	0	1	1	0	X	3

==== Draw 3 ====
Friday, February 20, 14:00

Sheet A	1	2	3	4	5	6	7	8	9	10	Final
South Korea (Jeung)	0	0	3	1	0	2	0	2	0	1	9
Poland (Kluś) 🔨	0	1	0	0	2	0	1	0	1	0	5

Sheet B	1	2	3	4	5	6	7	8	9	10	Final
Russia (Privivkova) 🔨	0	1	0	0	3	2	0	1	0	1	8
United States (Stewart)	1	0	1	1	0	0	1	0	1	0	5

Sheet C	1	2	3	4	5	6	7	8	9	10	Final
Great Britain (Reid)	0	0	0	0	0	1	1	1	2	0	5
Czech Republic (Doudová) 🔨	2	0	1	1	1	0	0	0	0	1	6

Sheet D	1	2	3	4	5	6	7	8	9	10	Final
Japan (Matsumara)	0	1	0	1	0	0	1	0	X	X	3
Canada (Nicol) 🔨	4	0	3	0	2	1	0	2	X	X	12

Sheet E	1	2	3	4	5	6	7	8	9	10	Final
Sweden (Viktorsson) 🔨	0	1	0	1	0	0	1	0	0	X	3
China (Wang)	0	0	2	0	1	2	0	2	2	X	9

==== Draw 4 ====
Saturday, February 21, 9:00

Sheet A	1	2	3	4	5	6	7	8	9	10	Final
Russia (Privivkova) 🔨	0	0	0	0	1	0	1	0	0	X	2
Great Britain (Reid)	2	2	1	1	0	1	0	1	1	X	9

Sheet B	1	2	3	4	5	6	7	8	9	10	Final
Sweden (Viktorsson)	0	2	0	0	2	0	0	0	X	X	4
Canada (Nicol) 🔨	1	0	1	2	0	1	3	2	X	X	10

Sheet C	1	2	3	4	5	6	7	8	9	10	Final
China (Wang)	0	2	0	4	2	3	2	X	X	X	13
Poland (Kluś) 🔨	2	0	1	0	0	0	0	X	X	X	3

Sheet D	1	2	3	4	5	6	7	8	9	10	Final
South Korea (Jeung) 🔨	0	1	0	0	0	1	0	X	X	X	2
Czech Republic (Doudová)	1	0	2	1	1	0	4	X	X	X	9

Sheet E	1	2	3	4	5	6	7	8	9	10	Final
United States (Stewart) 🔨	0	2	0	0	2	0	1	0	0	X	5
Japan (Matsumara)	1	0	1	1	0	1	0	1	4	X	9

==== Draw 5 ====
Saturday, February 21, 19:00

Sheet A	1	2	3	4	5	6	7	8	9	10	Final
Sweden (Viktorsson) 🔨	2	0	2	2	0	0	0	0	0	X	6
Czech Republic (Doudová)	0	2	0	0	1	3	2	2	1	X	11

Sheet B	1	2	3	4	5	6	7	8	9	10	Final
Great Britain (Reid) 🔨	1	0	0	0	1	1	2	0	1	X	6
Japan (Matsumara)	0	1	0	1	0	0	0	1	0	X	3

Sheet C	1	2	3	4	5	6	7	8	9	10	Final
Russia (Privivkova) 🔨	2	2	0	0	1	0	2	0	0	1	8
South Korea (Jeung)	0	0	3	0	0	1	0	1	1	0	6

Sheet D	1	2	3	4	5	6	7	8	9	10	Final
China (Wang) 🔨	1	1	4	2	0	2	X	X	X	X	10
United States (Stewart)	0	0	0	0	1	0	X	X	X	X	1

Sheet E	1	2	3	4	5	6	7	8	9	10	Final
Poland (Kluś)	0	2	0	1	0	0	1	0	1	0	5
Canada (Nicol) 🔨	2	0	1	0	1	1	0	1	0	1	7

==== Draw 6 ====
Sunday, February 22, 14:00

Sheet A	1	2	3	4	5	6	7	8	9	10	Final
Poland (Kluś)	1	0	0	3	0	1	0	0	0	X	5
United States (Stewart) 🔨	0	3	1	0	2	0	0	1	1	X	8

Sheet B	1	2	3	4	5	6	7	8	9	10	Final
Canada (Nicol) 🔨	0	1	1	0	2	0	2	0	0	2	8
South Korea (Jeung)	1	0	0	2	0	1	0	2	0	0	6

Sheet C	1	2	3	4	5	6	7	8	9	10	Final
Japan (Matsumara) 🔨	2	1	3	1	0	2	0	0	1	X	10
China (Wang)	0	0	0	0	1	0	2	0	0	X	3

Sheet D	1	2	3	4	5	6	7	8	9	10	Final
Great Britain (Reid) 🔨	1	0	0	0	2	0	0	X	X	X	3
Sweden (Viktorsson)	0	1	1	4	0	0	3	X	X	X	9

Sheet E	1	2	3	4	5	6	7	8	9	10	Final
Russia (Privivkova) 🔨	1	0	0	2	0	2	0	0	1	X	6
Czech Republic (Doudová)	0	1	0	0	0	0	1	1	0	X	3

==== Draw 7 ====
Monday, February 23, 9:00

Sheet A	1	2	3	4	5	6	7	8	9	10	Final
China (Wang) 🔨	1	0	0	0	0	0	1	0	2	2	6
Canada (Nicol)	0	2	2	0	1	0	0	2	0	0	7

Sheet B	1	2	3	4	5	6	7	8	9	10	Final
Poland (Kluś)	0	0	1	0	0	0	0	X	X	X	1
Russia (Privivkova) 🔨	3	3	0	0	2	1	2	X	X	X	11

Sheet C	1	2	3	4	5	6	7	8	9	10	Final
United States (Stewart)	1	0	1	0	0	0	2	0	1	0	5
Great Britain (Reid) 🔨	0	2	0	0	2	0	0	1	0	1	6

Sheet D	1	2	3	4	5	6	7	8	9	10	Final
Czech Republic (Doudová) 🔨	0	0	2	0	0	0	0	1	0	X	3
Japan (Matsumara)	1	0	0	2	1	1	1	0	1	X	7

Sheet E	1	2	3	4	5	6	7	8	9	10	Final
South Korea (Jeung)	0	2	0	1	0	1	0	0	1	0	5
Sweden (Viktorsson) 🔨	1	0	1	0	1	0	2	0	0	1	6

==== Draw 8 ====
Monday, February 23, 19:00

Sheet A	1	2	3	4	5	6	7	8	9	10	Final
Japan (Matsumara)	0	0	0	0	1	0	2	0	X	X	3
South Korea (Jeung) 🔨	0	3	1	1	0	3	0	2	X	X	10

Sheet B	1	2	3	4	5	6	7	8	9	10	Final
United States (Stewart) 🔨	0	0	0	0	1	0	1	1	0	0	3
Czech Republic (Doudová)	0	0	0	0	0	2	0	0	1	2	5

Sheet C	1	2	3	4	5	6	7	8	9	10	Final
Poland (Kluś)	0	0	0	0	0	0	0	X	X	X	0
Sweden (Viktorsson) 🔨	0	2	2	0	0	3	1	X	X	X	8

Sheet D	1	2	3	4	5	6	7	8	9	10	Final
Russia (Privivkova)	0	0	0	0	0	2	0	X	X	X	2
China (Wang) 🔨	2	1	4	1	2	0	3	X	X	X	13

Sheet E	1	2	3	4	5	6	7	8	9	10	Final
Canada (Nicol) 🔨	2	0	1	0	3	0	2	1	X	X	9
Great Britain (Reid)	0	1	0	2	0	0	0	0	X	X	3

==== Draw 9 ====
Thursday, February 24, 14:00

Sheet A	1	2	3	4	5	6	7	8	9	10	Final
United States (Stewart) 🔨	0	0	3	0	1	0	0	0	1	1	6
Sweden (Viktorsson)	1	0	0	1	0	2	0	0	0	0	4

Sheet B	1	2	3	4	5	6	7	8	9	10	Final
South Korea (Jeung)	0	1	0	0	0	0	X	X	X	X	1
China (Wang) 🔨	4	0	3	2	0	2	X	X	X	X	11

Sheet C	1	2	3	4	5	6	7	8	9	10	Final
Czech Republic (Doudová)	0	1	0	0	0	0	X	X	X	X	1
Canada (Nicol) 🔨	3	0	1	2	1	1	X	X	X	X	8

Sheet D	1	2	3	4	5	6	7	8	9	10	Final
Poland (Kluś)	2	0	0	0	0	0	1	0	2	0	5
Great Britain (Reid) 🔨	0	0	4	1	1	1	0	1	0	2	10

Sheet E	1	2	3	4	5	6	7	8	9	10	Final
Japan (Matsumara) 🔨	0	0	1	0	2	0	0	1	X	X	4
Russia (Privivkova)	1	1	0	5	0	1	2	0	X	X	10

=== Tiebreaker ===
Wednesday, February 25, 9:00

Sheet B	1	2	3	4	5	6	7	8	9	10	Final
Great Britain (Reid)	0	1	0	1	0	1	1	2	1	1	8
Czech Republic (Doudová) 🔨	3	0	2	0	0	0	0	0	0	0	5

=== Playoffs ===
Semifinal
1	Canada	7
4	Great Britain	5
2	China	11
3	Russia	2

Gold Medal Game
1	Canada	5
2	China	6
Bronze Medal Game
4	Great Britain	4
3	Russia	8

==== Semifinals ====
Thursday, February 26, 9:00

Team	1	2	3	4	5	6	7	8	9	10	Final
China (Wang) 🔨	1	1	5	1	2	1	0	0	X	X	11
Russia (Privivkova)	0	0	0	0	0	0	1	1	X	X	2

Team	1	2	3	4	5	6	7	8	9	10	Final
Great Britain (Reid)	0	1	0	0	4	0	0	0	0	X	5
Canada (Nicol) 🔨	0	0	1	0	0	0	2	1	3	X	7

==== Bronze Medal Game ====
Thursday, February 26, 14:00

Sheet B	1	2	3	4	5	6	7	8	9	10	Final
Russia (Privivkova) 🔨	0	0	2	1	0	1	0	2	0	2	8
Great Britain (Reid)	0	0	0	0	0	0	2	0	2	0	4

==== Gold Medal Game ====
Friday, February 27, 9:00

Sheet C	1	2	3	4	5	6	7	8	9	10	Final
China (Wang)	1	0	3	0	0	1	0	1	0	X	6
Canada (Nicol) 🔨	0	1	0	1	0	0	2	0	1	X	5
