= Veronika Herdová =

Czech curler

- Curler ♀
- Born: 11 December 1988 (age 37); Prague, Czechoslovakia

Team
- Curling club: CC Artima, Prague, CC Sokol Liboc, Prague

Curling career
- Member Association: Czech Republic
- World Championship: 2 (2011, 2014)
- European Championship: 2 (2010, 2013)
- Other appearances: World Junior Championships: 1 (2010)
Medal record
Curling

Veronika Herdová (born 11 December 1988) is a Czech curler.

== Teams ==
Season	Skip	Third	Second	Lead	Alternate	Coach	Events
2009–10	Anna Kubešková	Tereza Plíšková	Martina Strnadová	Zuzana Hájková	Veronika Herdová	Jiří Candra	WJCC 2010 (8th)
2010–11	Anna Kubešková	Tereza Plíšková	Veronika Herdová	Eliška Jalovcová	Luisa Illková	Karel Kubeška	ECC 2010 (11th)
2010–11	Anna Kubešková	Tereza Plíšková	Luisa Illková	Eliška Jalovcová	Veronika Herdová	Karel Kubeška	WCC 2011 (12th)
2011–12	Anna Kubešková	Tereza Plíšková	Veronika Jalovcová	Luisa Illková	Veronika Herdová		
2012–13	Anna Kubešková	Tereza Plíšková	Klára Svatoňová	Veronika Herdová			
2013–14	Anna Kubešková	Tereza Plíšková	Martina Strnadová	Klára Svatoňová	Veronika Herdová	Karel Kubeška	ECC 2013 (6th)
2013–14	Anna Kubešková	Tereza Plíšková	Klára Svatoňová	Veronika Herdová	Martina Strnadová; Alžběta Baudyšová (WWCC)	Karel Kubeška (WWCC)	WCC 2014 (9th)
2014–15	Anna Kubešková	Tereza Plíšková	Klára Svatoňová	Veronika Herdová	Alžběta Baudyšová		
