= Kay Adams (curler) =

Scottish curler

- Curler ♀
- Born: 27 September 1987 (age 39); Stirling, Scotland

Curling career
- Member Association: Scotland
- European Championship: 1 (2011)
- Other appearances: Winter Universiade: 1 (2009), European Mixed Curling Championship: 1 (2013)
Medal record
Curling
European Championships
Gold medal – first place	2011 Moscow
World Junior Championships
Gold medal – first place	2008 Östersund
Gold medal – first place	2009 Vancouver
European Mixed Championship
Silver medal – second place	2013 Edinburgh
Scottish Women's Championship
Bronze medal – third place	2012 Perth

Kay Adams (born 27 September 1987 in Stirling) is a Scottish curler. She is left-handed.

Her younger sister Vicki Chalmers (née Vicki Adams) plays in Eve Muirhead's team.

== Teams ==
=== Women's ===
Season	Skip	Third	Second	Lead	Alternate	Coach	Events
2004–05	Victoria Sloan	Kerry Barr	Clare Wyllie	Laura Kirkpatrick	Kay Adams	Ronald Brewster	WJCC 2005 (7th)
2005	Lauren Johnston	Kerry Barr	Linsey Spence	Jennifer Priestley	Kay Adams	Nancy Murdoch	EYOWF 2005 (bronze)
2005–06	Jennifer Morrison	Sarah Reid	Kerry Barr	Eve Muirhead	Kay Adams		
2006–07	Kerry Barr	Sarah Reid	Eve Muirhead	Jennifer Morrison	Kay Adams		
2007–08	Eve Muirhead	Kerry Barr	Vicki Adams	Sarah MacIntyre	Kay Adams	Isobel Hannen	WJCC 2008 (gold)
2008–09	Eve Muirhead	Anna Sloan	Vicki Adams	Sarah MacIntyre	Kay Adams	Isobel Hannen	WJCC 2009 (gold)
2009	Sarah Reid	Kay Adams	Vicki Adams	Sarah MacIntyre	Laura Kirkpatrick	Keith Prentice	WUG 2009 (4th)
2009–10	Gillian Howard	Kay Adams	Linsey Spence	Sarah MacIntyre			
2010–11	Sarah Reid	Kerry Barr	Kay Adams	Barbara McPake			SWCC 2011 (5th)
2011–12	Eve Muirhead	Anna Sloan	Vicki Adams	Claire Hamilton	Kay Adams	Gordon Muirhead	ECC 2011 (gold)
2011–12	Jackie Lockhart	Karen Kennedy	Kay Adams	Sarah MacIntyre			SWCC 2012 (bronze)
2012–13	Lorna Vevers	Sarah Reid	Alice Spence	Kay Adams			

=== Mixed ===
Season	Skip	Third	Second	Lead	Coach	Events
2013–14	Ewan MacDonald	Kay Adams	Euan Byers	Karen Barthelemy	Eve Muirhead	EMxCC 2013 (silver)
