= Daniel Rafael =

Canadian curler

- Curler
- Born: 16 November 1961 (age 64); Mont-Laurier, Quebec, Canada

Daniel J. "Dan" Rafael (born November 16, 1961, in Mont-Laurier, Quebec, Canada) is a Canadian male curler and curling coach. He worked as national curling coach (head coach of national curling federation) and national curling teams coach of France, China, Italy, Czech Republic, Turkey, Russia, Poland. Rafael now works as the coach for the Spanish mixed doubles team.

He grew up and started playing curling in Schefferville, Quebec, where he played his entire junior curling career. Rafael, as of 2025, now resides in Portugal.

== Teams and events ==
Season	Skip	Third	Second	Lead
1994–95	Peter Byrns	Daniel Rafael	Kevin Yerbury	J. Laverdiere
2001–02	Daniel Rafael	?	?	?
2002–03	Peter Byrns	Daniel Rafael	Don Field	Mike Kennedy
2003–04	Dan Elie	Gerry Lafferty	Daniel Rafael	Patrice Lemieux

== National coach ==
Years	Country
2007	France
2007–2010	China
2010–2012	Italy
2012–2014	Czech Republic
2014–2015	Turkey
2015–2018	China
2018–2022	Russia
2023–Present	Spain

== Record as a coach of national teams ==
Year	Tournament, event	National team	Place
2007	2007 World Men's Curling Championship	France (men)	7
2007	2007 Pacific Curling Championships	China (men)	1st place, gold medalist(s)
2007	2007 Pacific Curling Championships	China (women)	1st place, gold medalist(s)
2008	2008 World Men's Curling Championship	China (men)	4
2008	2008 Pacific Curling Championships	China (men)	1st place, gold medalist(s)
2008	2008 Pacific Curling Championships	China (women)	1st place, gold medalist(s)
2009	2009 Pacific Junior Curling Championships	China (junior men)	1st place, gold medalist(s)
2009	2009 Pacific Junior Curling Championships	China (junior women)	2nd place, silver medalist(s)
2009	2009 Winter Universiade	China (men)	3rd place, bronze medalist(s)
2009	2009 Winter Universiade	China (women)	1st place, gold medalist(s)
2009	2009 World Women's Curling Championship	China (women)	1st place, gold medalist(s)
2009	2009 World Men's Curling Championship	China (men)	9
2009	2009 World Mixed Doubles Curling Championship	China (mixed doubles)	4
2009	2009 Pacific Curling Championships	China (men)	1st place, gold medalist(s)
2009	2009 Pacific Curling Championships	China (women)	1st place, gold medalist(s)
2010	2010 Winter Olympics	China (women)	3rd place, bronze medalist(s)
2010	2010 World Women's Curling Championship	China (women)	7
2010	2010 European Curling Championships	Italy (men)	11
2010	2010 European Curling Championships	Italy (women)	12
2011	2011 European Curling Championships	Italy (men)	10
2012	2012 European Junior Curling Challenge	Italy (junior men)	1st place, gold medalist(s)
2012	2012 European Junior Curling Challenge	Italy (junior women)	1st place, gold medalist(s)
2012	2012 World Wheelchair Curling Championship	Italy (wheelchair)	10
2012	2012 World Women's Curling Championship	Italy (women)	10
2012	2012 European Curling Championships	Czech Republic (men)	3rd place, bronze medalist(s)
2012	2012 European Curling Championships	Czech Republic (women)	8
2013	2013 World Men's Curling Championship	Czech Republic (men)	8
2014	2014 World Men's Curling Championship	Czech Republic (men)	7
2014	2014 World Mixed Doubles Curling Championship	Czech Republic (mixed doubles)	7
2014	2014 European Mixed Curling Championship	Turkey (mixed)	21
2014	2014 European Curling Championships	Turkey (men)	15
2014	2014 European Curling Championships	Turkey (women)	15
2015	2015 European Junior Curling Challenge	Turkey (junior men)	3rd place, bronze medalist(s)
2015	2015 European Junior Curling Challenge	Turkey (junior women)	2nd place, silver medalist(s)
2015	2015 World Mixed Doubles Curling Championship	Turkey (mixed doubles)	22
2016	2016 World Mixed Doubles Curling Championship	Russia (mixed doubles)	1st place, gold medalist(s)
2017	2017 World Women's Curling Championship	Russia (women)	2nd place, silver medalist(s)
2017	2017 European Curling Championships	Poland (women)	2nd place, silver medalist(s)
2018	2018 Winter Olympics	OAR (Russia) (mixed doubles)	DSQ
2018	2018 World Mixed Doubles Curling Championship	Russia (mixed doubles)	2nd place, silver medalist(s)
2018	2018–19 Curling World Cup – First Leg	China (men)	7
2018	2018 Pacific-Asia Curling Championships	China (men)	2nd place, silver medalist(s)
2018	2018–19 Curling World Cup – Second Leg	China (mixed doubles)	6
2019	2018–19 Curling World Cup – Third Leg	China (men)	8
2019	2019 World Men's Curling Championship	China (men)	11
2024	2024 World Mixed Doubles Curling Championship	Spain (mixed doubles)	20
2025	2025 World Mixed Doubles Curling Championship	Spain (mixed doubles)	TBD
