= Zuzana Paulová =

Czech curler (born 1993)

- Curler
- Born: Zuzana Hájková; 28 January 1993 (age 33); Prague, Czech Republic

Team
- Skip: Zuzana Paulová
- Third: Alžběta Zelingrová
- Second: Michaela Baudyšová
- Lead: Aneta Müllerová
- Alternate: Karolína Špundová
- Mixed doubles partner: Tomáš Paul

Curling career
- Member Association: Czech Republic
- World Mixed Doubles Championship: 7 (2013, 2014, 2017, 2018, 2019, 2021, 2024)
- European Championship: 2 (2008, 2014)
- World Junior Curling Championship: 4 (2010, 2012, 2013, 2014)
- Olympic: 1 (2022)
Medal record
Curling
Representing Czech Republic
World Mixed Doubles Curling Championship
Bronze medal – third place	2013 Fredericton
European Championship B-Division
Gold medal – first place	2024 Östersund
World Junior Curling Championships
Silver medal – second place	2012 Östersund
Czech Women's Championship
Silver medal – second place	2019 Prague

Zuzana Paulová (born 28 January 1993 as Zuzana Hájková) is a Czech curler.

== Curling career ==
=== Women's ===
As a junior curler, Paulová represented the Czech Republic in four World Junior Curling Championships. Her first trip there was the 2010 World Junior Curling Championships throwing lead rocks for Anna Kubešková. The team finished in 8th place. Hájková returned to the World Juniors in 2012, skipping a team of Iveta Janatová, Klára Svatoňová and Eva Málková while throwing third stones. The team posted a 6-3 round robin record, putting them in second place. In the playoffs, they lost in the 1 vs. 2 game to Scotland (skipped by Hannah Fleming) but won their semifinal game against Sweden's Sara McManus rink, putting them into the final. There, they would play against Scotland again, but once again would come up short, settling for the bronze medal.

Paulová returned to the World Juniors the next year. Paulová continued to play third stones, but Janatová would skip the team. The team would end up finishing fourth place. Paulová took back skipping duties at the 2013 World Junior Curling Championships but continued to throw third stones while Janatová threw last bricks. Alžběta Baudyšová and Klára Svatoňová rounded out the team. Paulová led her team to a 3–6 record for a 7th-place finish.

Paulová has twice played for the Czechs at the European Curling Championships, both times as the team's alternate. She would play in three games at the 2008 European Curling Championships on a team skipped by Katerina Urbanova, finishing in 10th place. She would return in 2014, playing in seven games on a team skipped by Linda Klimova. The team would again finish in 10th place.

=== Mixed doubles ===
In addition to regular curling, Paulová plays mixed doubles. She has played in five World Mixed Doubles Curling Championships for her native Czech Republic. At her first World Championship in 2013, she and partner Tomáš Paul ended up capturing the bronze medal. At the 2014 World Mixed Doubles Curling Championship, the pair finished in 7th, and at the 2017 World Mixed Doubles Curling Championship, they finished 4th, which would not be enough to qualify them for the 2018 Winter Olympics.

Paulová and Paul represented the Czech Republic again at the 2018 and 2019 World Mixed Doubles Curling Championships, finishing 10th in 2018 and losing in the quarterfinals in 2019.

In February 2020, Paulová and Paul won 2020 Czech Mixed Doubles Curling Championship one more time. They were set to represent the Czech Republic at the 2020 World Mixed Doubles Curling Championship before the event was cancelled due to the COVID-19 pandemic. In April 2021, Paulová and Paul represented at World Mixed Doubles Curling Championship, finishing at the 4th place in the round robin group. This result qualified them to play an Olympic Qualification Game against the USA to gain a spot at the Olympic Games in Beijing 2022. The Czech duo won the game 8:6 and qualified the Czech Republic to the Olympic Games for the first time in Czech curling history.
