= Anna Kubešková =

Czech curler

- Curler
- Born: 30 October 1989 (age 37); Prague, Czechoslovakia

Team
- Curling club: CC Sokol Liboc, Prague, CZE
- Skip: Anna Kubešková
- Third: Michaela Baudyšová
- Second: Aneta Müllerová
- Lead: Klara Pařízková
- Alternate: Karolína Špundová

Curling career
- Member Association: Czech Republic
- World Championship: 4 (2014, 2017, 2018, 2021)
- European Championship: 10 (2010, 2012, 2013, 2015, 2016, 2017, 2018, 2019, 2023, 2025)
Medal record
Women's curling
Czech Women's Championship
Gold medal – first place	2010
Gold medal – first place	2013
Gold medal – first place	2015
Gold medal – first place	2016
Gold medal – first place	2017
Gold medal – first place	2018
Gold medal – first place	2019
Gold medal – first place	2020
Gold medal – first place	2022
Gold medal – first place	2023
Silver medal – second place	2009
Silver medal – second place	2014
Bronze medal – third place	2006

Anna Kubešková (born 30 October 1989) is a Czech curler from Prague. She currently skips the Czech national women's curling team.

== Career ==
Kubešková represented the Czech Republic at four World Junior Curling Championships (2007, 2009, 2010 and 2011) and at the 2011 Winter Universiade.

In women's play, Kubešková first represented her country at the 2010 European Curling Championships, where she led her country to a 12–1 record in the "B" Pool. She again played at the Euros in 2012 playing second for Linda Klimova. The team finished with a 3–7 record in eighth place. Kubešková skipped the Czech Republic team at the 2013 European Curling Championships, where they finished the event with a 4–5 record in 6th place. The next month, the team played in the Olympic qualifying tournament in order to play at the 2014 Winter Olympics. The team finished the event with a 2–4 record, which was not enough to qualify. Later that season they played at the 2014 Ford World Women's Curling Championship.

Kubešková led the Czech Republic to an 8–3 record in the "B" Pool of the 2015 European Curling Championships and in 2016 they played in the 2016 Europeans, finishing in 4th place, which also qualified them for the 2017 World Women's Curling Championship. There, the finished with a 5–6 record. At the 2017 Euros, they finished with a 3–6 record, qualifying once again for the World Championship. At the 2018 World Women's Curling Championship, the Czech team qualified for the playoffs for the first time with a 6–6 record. They then lost the qualification game 7–3 to Russia's Victoria Moiseeva. The 2018 Europeans were not successful for the Czechs as they did not qualify for the World Championship. The following season, they would qualify for the Worlds, after going 3–6 at the 2019 European Curling Championships. The 2020 World Women's Curling Championship was cancelled due to the COVID-19 pandemic, but Kubešková represented the Czechs at the 2021 World Women's Curling Championship which was played in a bio-secure "bubble" to prevent spread of the virus. There, she led her team to a 3–10 record, in twelfth place.

Kubešková also participated in mixed doubles curling with her father Karel Kubeška. They finished in sixth place at the 2009 World Mixed Doubles Curling Championship, 9th at the 2010 World Mixed Doubles Curling Championship. At the 2016 World Mixed Doubles Curling Championship, she partnered with Jiří Candra, and finished 21st.

== Personal life ==
Kubeškova is a daughter of Karel Kubeška, Czech curler and coach. Aside from curling she is also a professional journalist, having worked in economic desk of national Czech TV. As of 2020, she is a public relations professional.
