= Czech Junior Curling Championships =

Curling championships in the Czech Republic

The Czech Junior Curling Championships (Czech: MČRJ, MČR junioři, MČR juniorky) are the national championships of men's and women's junior curling teams in the Czech Republic. Junior level curlers must be under the age of 21. The championships have been held annually since 1992. The championships are organized by the Czech Curling Association (Czech: Český Svaz Curlingu).

== Champions and medallists ==
Team line-ups shows in order: fourth, third, second, lead, alternate, coach; skips marked bold.

=== Junior men ===
Year	Champion	Runner-up	Bronze
1992	Petřiny; Tomáš Válek, Daniel Florec, Jiří Urban, Macek	ÚDDM; Jan Kejř, Ondřej Hnát, Tomáš Danielis, Petr Šťastný	CC Savona; Patrik Svoboda, Robert Hacker, Jan Vlach, Ondřej Pazdera
1993	CC Savona; Vlastimil Vojtuš, Petr Štěpánek, Aleš Prchlík, Robert Hacker	Zlatá Praha; Tomáš Válek, Michal Hejmalíček, Miroslav Frolec, Tomáš Urban	ÚDDM; Jan Kejř, Petr Šťastný, Ondřej Hnát, Lukáš Vnuk
1994	CK Zlatá Praha; Tomáš Válek, Michal Hejmalíček, Miroslav Frolec, Tomáš Urban, alternates: Jakub Špringer, Michal Motl	CC Savona 2 Vlastimil Vojtuš, Petr Štěpánek, Aleš Prchlík, Robert Hacker, alternate: Ondřej Pazdera	CC Savona 1 Jan Kejř, Vít Nekovařík, Ondřej Šajner, Michal Behenský, alternate: Martin Puškař
1995	CC Savona 1 Vlastimil Vojtuš, Petr Štěpánek, Aleš Prchlík, Jan Kejř	CC Savona 2 Vít Nekovařík, Ondřej Šajner, Aleš Jindřich, Lukáš Němec	CC TJ Junior Praha; Petr Šťastný, Lukáš Vnuk, Daniel Vnuk, Ondřej Hnát, alternate: Jiří Snítil
1996	CC Savona 1 Petr Štěpánek, Aleš Jindřich, Vít Nekovařík, Jan Kejř, alternate: Ondřej Šajner	CC Savona 2 Jindřich Kitzberger, Luboš Kitzberger, Petr Šulc, Otto Švarc	CC Savona 3 Martin Puškař, Jan Puškař, Patrik Zamlay, Karel Uher
1997	CC Savona H Luboš Kitzberger, Karel Uher, Petr Šulc, Otto Švarc	CC Kolibris; Petr Fiřt, Martin Snítil, Jan Lebl, Jakub Pešek, alternates: Radovan Kautský, Ondřej Mihola, Michal Grünwald	CC Savona V Vít Nekovařík, Jindřich Kitzberger, Petr Šťastný, Ondřej Šajner
1998	CC Savona 1 Marek David, Karel Uher, Petr Šulc, Otto Švarc	CC Kolibris; Petr Fiřt, Martin Snítil, Jan Lebl, Petr Vonka	CC Savona 2 Vít Nekovařík, Jindřich Kitzberger, Petr Šťastný, Ondřej Šajner
1999	CC Savona 1 Marek David, Karel Uher, Petr Šulc, Otto Švarc, alternate: Jindřich Kitzberger	CC Kolibris; Jan Hlaváč, Martin Snítil, Jan Lebl, Petr Vonka, alternate: Václav Pořt	CC Savona 2 Vít Nekovařík, Jan Samueli, Petr Šťastný, Ondřej Šajner
2000	CC Savona 2 Otto Švarc, Petr Šťastný, Jan Samueli, Luboš Kitzberger, alternate: Radek Vopička	CC Savona 1 Petr Šulc, Jindřich Kitzberger, Karel Uher, Marek David, alternate: Vít Nekovařík	CC Kolibris 1 Václav Pořt, Jan Lebl, David Bláha, Jan Hlaváč, alternates: Jaroslav Macner, Jakub Jirotka
2001	CC Savona 1 Petr Šulc, Jindřich Kitzberger, Karel Uher, Marek David, alternate: Jan Samueli	CC Savona 2 Otto Švarc, Martin Štěpánek, Michal Vojtuš, Martin Hejhal, alternate: Vladislav Kubiš	1.KCK Trutnov; Miloš Hoferka, Jaroslav Koukal, Ondřej Nývlt, Luděk Munzar
2002	CC Savona 3 Petr Šulc, Jan Samueli, Karel Uher, Marek David, alternate: Jakub Bareš	CC Dion TR; Jakub Cabrnoch, Petr Kolečko, Matěj Peč, Jakub Prachař, alternate: Štěpán Prokop	1.KCK Trutnov; Miloš Hoferka, Jaroslav Koukal, Ondřej Nývlt, Luděk Munzar, alternate: Ivan Prouza
2003	1.KCK Trutnov A Miloš Hoferka, Luděk Munzar, Ivan Prouza, Ondřej Nývlt	Savona 1 Petr Šulc, Marek David, Karel Uher, Jan Samueli	Savona 2 Michal Vojtuš, Vladimír Kubiš, Martin Hejhal, Libor Čeloud, alternate: Martin Štěpánek
2004	CC Savona 3 Petr Šulc, Luděk Munzar, Jan Samueli, Jakub Bareš, alternate: Karel Uher	Kolibris 2 Ondřej Hurtík, Kryštof Chaloupek, Jiří Candra, Michal Láznička	Savona 4 Michal Vojtuš, Martin Hejhal, Libor Čeloud, Martin Štěpánek, alternate: Vladimír Kubiš
2005	Kolibris 2 Ondřej Hurtík, Kryštof Chaloupek, Jiří Candra, Michal Láznička	Savona 4 Jakub Bareš, Michal Vojtuš, Martin Hejhal, Martin Štěpánek, alternate: Libor Čeloud	Zbraslav H Jakub Okénka, Lukáš Klíma, Dominik Mokriš, Tomáš Paul, alternate: Ivo Šebek
2006	Savona 4 Jakub Bareš, Michal Vojtuš, Martin Hejhal, Martin Štěpánek	Kolibris 2 Ondřej Hurtík, Jiří Candra, Kryštof Chaloupek, Michal Láznička	Zbraslav H Lukáš Klíma, Tomáš Paul, Jakub Okénka, Dominik Mokriš, alternate: Jakub Šír
2007	Zlatá Praha; Kryštof Chaloupek, David Jirounek, Petr Vinante, Michal Láznička	Zbraslav H Lukáš Klíma, Tomáš Paul, Dominik Mokriš, Ivo Šebek, alternate: Jakub Okénka	Savona 5 Jiří Suppik, Vít Souček, Jakub Kováč, Michal Zdenka
2008	Savona 4 Jakub Bareš, Michal Vojtuš, Martin Hejhal, Martin Štěpánek, alternate: Libor Čeloud	Savona 5 Jiří Suppik, Vít Souček, Jakub Kováč, Michal Zdenka	Zbraslav H Lukáš Klíma, Tomáš Paul, Dominik Mokriš, Samuel Mokriš
2009	Savona 1 Jiří Suppik, Michal Vojtuš, Martin Hejhal, Libor Čeloud, alternate: Michal Zdenka, coach: Petr Šulc	Kolibris 3 Petr Král, Martin Král, Jiří Deyl, Radek Tymeš, alternate: Jakub Hurtík	Zbraslav H Lukáš Klíma, Marek Černovský, Samuel Mokriš, Jan Zelingr
2010	Zbraslav H Lukáš Klíma, Samuel Mokriš, Karel Klíma, Jakub Splavec	Dion HJ; Jaroslav Vedral, Štěpán Hron, Kryštof Krupanský, Michal Munk, coach: Lenka Černovská	Kolibris 3 Martin Král, Jan Šimek, Radek Tymeš, Michal Novák
2011	Dion RM; Marek Černovský, Jakub Splavec, Kryštof Krupanský, alternate: Jaroslav Vedral, coach: Lenka Černovská	Dion HJ; Michal Munk, Tomáš Rendl, Martin Jurík, coach: Lenka Černovská	Kolibris 3 Martin Král, Jakub Hurtík, Radek Tymeš, Michal Novák, coach: Petr Král
2012	Dion X Kryštof Krupanský, Jakub Splavec, Štěpán Hron, coach: Petr Horák	Dion HJ; Michal Munk, Martin Jurík, Tomáš Rendl, Jan Krejčí	RIPER Hradec Králové; Jiří Provázek, Adam Dušek, Jakub Stavrovski, Daniel Dušek
2013	Dion X Marek Černovský, Kryštof Krupanský, Jan Zelingr, Štěpán Hron, coach: Petr Horák	Savona 1 Jaroslav Vedral, Jakub Splavec, Pavel Janata, Václav Novák	RIPER Hradec Králové; Adam Dušek, Daniel Hubálek, Jiří Provázek, Daniel Dušek
2014	Dion X Kryštof Krupanský, Štěpán Hron, Václav Novák, Pavel Janata, alternate: Marek Černovský, coach: Petr Horák	Dion YB; Jaroslav Vedral, Lukáš Klípa, Martin Blahovec, Pavel Mareš	ČSC 3 Alexander Jiral, David Verner, Adam Krupanský, Oliver Kobián, coach: Tomáš Paul
2015	Dion X Marek Černovský, Kryštof Krupanský, Václav Novák, Štěpán Hron, alternate: Pavel Janata, coach: Petr Horák	Ledoborci Juniors; Adam Podolka, Oliver Kobián, David Verner, Adam Krupanský, coach: Karolína Frederiksen	Dion YB; Pavel Mareš, Lukáš Klípa, Martin Blahovec, Dominik Švarc, coach: Jaroslav Vedral
2016	Dion YB; Pavel Mareš, Lukáš Klípa, Martin Blahovec, Václav Novák, coach: Jaroslav Vedral	Loupežníci Jičín; Ondřej Bodlák ml., Matěj Kaván, David Špiroch, Jakub Hermann, coach: Ondřej Bodlák	Ledoborci Juniors; Adam Podolka, David Verner, Oliver Kobián, Adam Krupanský, alternate: David Balogh
2017	Dion YB; Pavel Mareš, Lukáš Klípa, Martin Blahovec, David Verner, coach: Jaroslav Vedral	Savona 6 Dominik Kocík, Dominik Švarc, Jan Bořecký, Aleš Hercok, alternate: Petr Zajíc, coach: Martina Strnadová	Ledoborci NG; Jakub Rychlý, Jakub Hanák, Maroš Kövér, Jiří Matějíček, alternates: Matěj Koudelka, David Balogh, coach: Kryštof Krupanský
2018	Ledoborci Juniors; Adam Podolka, Martin Blahovec, Pavel Mareš, David Verner, alternate: František Jiral, coach: Jaroslav Vedral	Ledoborci NG; Jakub Rychlý, Jakub Hanák, Jiří Matějíček, David Balogh, alternate: Matěj Koudelka, coach: Kryštof Krupanský	Ledoborci Army; Matyáš Votava, David Jakl, Daniel Peter, Kryštof Pecha, alternate: Luděk Dembovský ml., coach: Martin Votava
2019	Ledoborci Juniors; Adam Podolka, Martin Blahovec, Dominik Švarc, František Jiral, coach: Jaroslav Vedral	Loupežníci Jičín; Matěj Kaván, Albert Schätz, Ondřej Bodlák ml., Kryštof Žďárský, coach: Ondřej Bodlák	Dion XY; Vít Chabičovský, Marek Bříza, David Škácha, alternate: Tobiáš Votava, coach: Petr Horák
2020	Dion XY; Vít Chabičovský, Marek Bříza, Matyáš Votava, Tobiáš Votava, coach: Petr Štěpánek	Ledoborci Juniors; Adam Podolka, Dominik Švarc, Oliver Kobián, coach: Jaroslav Vedral	Ledoborci OS; David Jakl, Aleš Hercok, Daniel Peter, David Škácha, alternate: Luděk Dembovský ml., coach: Martin Votava

=== Junior women ===
Year	Champion	Runner-up	Bronze
1992	Petřiny; Dagmar Šedivá, Veronika Křenková, Martina Šedivá	Armabeton; Jana Nováková, Michaela Murínová, Petra Murínová, Linda Inemanová	—
1993	Armabeton; Jana Nováková, Michaela Murínová, Petra Murínová, Linda Inemanová	Zlatá Praha Ž Dagmar Šedivá, Veronika Křenková, Martina Šedivá, Michaela Brožová	BCC; Monika Tilschová, Helena Menšíková, Martina Horská, Lucie Hladká, alternate: Marcela Hložánková
1994	CC Aritma 1 Jana Linhartová, Linda Inemanová, Michaela Murínová, Petra Murínová	CC Zlatá Praha; Dagmar Šedivá, Kateřina Lepšíková, Veronika Povolná, Michaela Brožová	CC Aritma 1 Kristýna Mudrochová, Helena Řípová, Mirka Krolopová, Monika Loudová
1995	CC Aritma; Jana Linhartová, Linda Inemanová, Michaela Murínová, Petra Murínová	CC Zlatá Praha; Dagmar Šedivá, Kateřina Lepšíková, Veronika Povolná, Michaela Brožová	Bohemian CC / CC Aritma; Helena Řípová, Gabriela Novotná, Barbora Novotná, Marcela Setinská
1996	CC Aritma; Jana Linhartová, Michaela Murínová, Petra Murínová, Helena Řípová, alternate: Olga Ondráčková	CC Savona 2 Martina Bláhová, Valerie Novotná, Monika Loudová, Iva Neumannová, alternate: Renata Hedvíková	Bohemian CC; Vendula Blažková, Hana Synáčková, Kateřina Doubravová, Zdislava Brtnická, alternates: Gabriela Novotná, Eva Kučerová
1997	CC Kolibris; Vendula Blažková, Hana Synáčková, Gabriela Novotná, Barbora Novotná, alternates: Eva Štampachová, Šárka Doudová, Kateřina Urbanová	CC Savona; Kateřina Samueliová, Michaela Wagnerová, Lenka Kučerová, Barbora Schmidová, alternate: Renata Hedvíková	—
1998	CC Kolibris 1 Vendula Blažková, Hana Synáčková, Eva Štampachová, Barbora Novotná, запасная: Šárka Doudová	CC TJ Junior Praha; Lenka Danielisová, Jana Jelínková, Jana Majerová, Ivana Lužaičová	CC Savona 1 Kateřina Samueliová, Michaela Wagnerová, Lenka Kučerová, Barbora Schmidová, alternate: Renata Hedvíková
1999	CC Kolibris 1 Vendula Blažková, Hana Synáčková, Eva Štampachová, Barbora Novotná, alternate: Šárka Doudová	CC Savona 4 Kateřina Urbanová, Iva Kocurová, Kateřina Šondová, Martina Ježková, alternates: Kateřina Lepšíková, Veronika Geroldová	CC TJ Junior Praha; Lenka Danielisová, Jana Jelínková, Jana Majerová, Ivana Lužaičová, alternate: Jana Stárková
2000	CC TJ Junior Praha; Lenka Danielisová, Jana Jelínková, Ivana Lužaičová, Jana Majerová, alternates: Lucie Pokorná, Lenka Kučerová	CC Kolibris 1 Vendula Blažková, Šárka Doudová, Eva Štampachová, Barbora Novotná, alternate: Michala Souhradová	CC Savona M Martina Ježková, Michaela Wagnerová, Barbora Schmidtová, Kateřina Urbanová, alternate: Kateřina Samueliová
2001	CC Savona 1 Lenka Danielisová, Jana Jelínková, Hana Synáčková, Jana Šimmerová, alternate: Lenka Kučerová	CC Kolibris 1 Anna Cermanová, Šárka Doudová, Eva Štampachová, Eva Seifertová, alternates: Michala Souhradová, Karolína Pilařová	1.KCK Trutnov; Daniela Munzarová, Vendula Brožková, Alice Schánilová, Šárka Kořínková
2002	CC Kolibris 1 Anna Cermanová, Šárka Doudová, Eva Štampachová, Eva Seifertová, alternate: Michala Souhradová	CC Savona 1 Martina Ježková, Michaela Wagnerová, Barbora Schmidtová, Kateřina Urbanová, alternate: Kateřina Samueliová	1.KCK Trutnov; Daniela Munzarová, Vendula Brožková, Alice Schánilová, Lenka Hubková
2003	Kolibris 3Ž; Šárka Doudová, Michala Souhradová, Anna Cernanová, Eva Seifertová, alternate: Eva Štampachová	Savona M Michala Wagnerová, Kateřina Samueliová, Barbora Schmidová, Lenka Kučerová, alternate: Kateřina Urbanová	Dion SJ; Сара Ягодова, Lenka Černovská, Jana Šafaříková, Kristýna Šamšová
2004	Kolibris 1 Šárka Doudová, Eva Štampachová, Michala Souhradová, Eva Seifertová, alternate: Anna Cernanová	CC Dion Ž Jana Šafaříková, Lenka Černovská, Kateřina Samueliová, Kateřina Urbanová, alternate: Andrea Dlabalová	Savona D Kamila Mošová, Lenka Kučerová, Kamila Samkova, Eva Butorázová, alternate: Adéla Čaňová
2005	Savona D Kamila Mošová, Lenka Kučerová, Kamila Samkova, Martina Strnadová	Dion DJ; Lenka Černovská, Michala Souhradová, Jana Šimmerová, Iveta Janatová, alternate: Beatrice Jahodová	Zlatá Praha Ž Renata Kubínová, Beáta Jurčíková, Kristýna Feistová
2006	Zbraslav D Linda Klímová, Agáta Kadeřávková, Michaela Nadherova, Kristýna Feistová	Aritma 3 Anna Kubešková, Luisa Illková, Eliška Jalovcová, Veronika Herdová, alternate: Tereza Plíšková, coach: Karel Kubeška	Savona D Kamila Mošová, Eva Málková, Kamila Samkova, Gabriela Martínková, alternate: Martina Strnadová
2007	Aritma 3 Anna Kubešková, Luisa Illková, Tereza Plíšková, Eliška Jalovcová, alternate: Veronika Herdová, coach: Karel Kubeška	Zbraslav D Linda Klímová, Michaela Nadherova, Kamila Mošová, Kristýna Feistová	Savona M Martina Strnadová, Eva Málková, Kamila Samkova, Mirka Strnadová
2008	Aritma 3 Anna Kubešková, Tereza Plíšková, Luisa Illková, Eliška Jalovcová, alternate: Veronika Herdová, coach: Karel Kubeška	Zbraslav D Linda Klímová, Kristýna Feistová, Kateřina Bičíková, Kristýna Kovaříková	1.CK Brno juniorky Martina Strnadová, Eva Málková, Zuzana Vlčková, Barbora Henzlová
2009	Aritma 3 Anna Kubešková, Tereza Plíšková, Veronika Herdová, Eliška Jalovcová, coach: Karel Kubeška	Savona M Zuzana Hájková, Martina Strnadová, Iveta Janatová, Eva Málková	Dion DJ; Pavla Prokšíková, Klára Svatoňová, Helena Králová
2010	Aritma 3 Anna Kubešková, Tereza Plíšková, Kateřina Knížková, Eliška Jalovcová	Savona M Martina Strnadová, Zuzana Hájková, Iveta Janatová, Eva Málková, coach: Radek Boháč	Dion DJ; Pavla Prokšíková, Klára Svatoňová, Helena Králová, Veronika Kramlová, coach: Vladimír Černovský
2011	Savona Z Zuzana Hájková, Iveta Janatová, Eva Málková, coach: Radek Boháč	Dion DJ; Pavla Prokšíková, Klára Svatoňová, Kateřina Knížková, Helena Králová, alternate: Alžběta Baudyšová, coach: Jakub Kováč	Trutnov; Renata Matějíčková, Alena Dolenská, Nela Kirschová, Natálie Zingová, coach: Jiří Lubina
2012	Savona Z Iveta Janatová, Zuzana Hájková, Petra Vinšová, Zuzana Hrůzová	Dion DJ; Klára Svatoňová, Alžběta Baudyšová, Kateřina Knížková, coach: Pavla Prokšíková	Trutnov; Renata Matějíčková, Denisa Kujovská, Natálie Zingová, coach: Vít Zinga
2013	Savona Z Iveta Janatová, Zuzana Hájková, Eliška Srnská, Helena Hájková	Dion DJ; Klára Svatoňová, Alžběta Baudyšová, Pavla Prokšíková, Kateřina Knížková, alternate: Lenka Hronová, coach: Jiří Candra	Trutnov; Elena Vaníčková, Eliška Rejmanová, Denisa Kujovská, Natálie Zingová, coach: Vít Zinga
2014	Dion DJ; Alžběta Baudyšová, Eliška Srnská, Lenka Hronová, Helena Hájková	ČSC 1 Nikola Brychtová, Julie Měchurová, Denisa Poštová, Zuzana Hrůzová, coach: Tomáš Paul	ČSC 2 Andrea Krupanská, Kristina Podrábská, Karolína Špundová, Magdalena Hrubá, alternate: Jana Hrádková, coach: Monika Podrábská
2015	Dion DJ; Alžběta Baudyšová, Eliška Srnská, Helena Hájková, Lenka Hronová, alternate: Michaela Baudyšová	CC Ledoborky; Andrea Krupanská, Kristina Podrábská, Denisa Poštová, Nikola Brychtová, alternates: Julie Měchurová, Karolína Špundová, coach: Monika Podrábská	PLC 1 Zuzana Hrůzová, Aneta Šmejdová, Kateřina Kovaříková, Anna Libánská, coach: Vlastimil Vojtuš
2016	Ledolamky; Kristina Podrábská, Andrea Krupanská, Karolína Špundová, Nikola Brychtová, alternate: Denisa Poštová, coach: Monika Podrábská	PLC 1 Ežen Kolčevská, Eliška Srnská, Lenka Hronová, Michaela Baudyšová, coach: Jiří Candra	PLC 2 Natálie-Klaudie Koscelanská, Magdalena Hrubá, Julie Přerovská, Anna Špůrová, alternate: Magdalena Přerovská
2017	Ledolamky; Andrea Krupanská, Denisa Poštová, Karolína Špundová, Kristina Podrábská, alternate: Zuzana Pražáková, coach: Monika Podrábská	Třešňovka D Laura Klímová, Jessica Šimková, Luisa Klímová, Zuzana Šimková, alternate: Ema Kynčlová, coach: Vojtěch Reitmajer	PLC 1 Natálie-Klaudie Koscelanská, Julie Přerovská, Magdalena Hrubá, Anna Špůrová, coach: Samuel Mokriš
2018	Třešňovka D Laura Klímová, Luisa Klímová, Ema Kynčlová, alternate: Sabina Horská, coach: Radek Klíma	Dion DJ; Julie Zelingrová, Veronika Vašáková, Eliška Hercoková, Kristýna Farková, alternate: Klára Koscelanská, coach: Petr Horák	Ledolamky; Kristina Podrábská, Andrea Krupanská, Karolína Špundová, Denisa Poštová, alternate: Michaela Baudyšová, coach: Monika Podrábská
2019	Třešňovka D Laura Klímová, Luisa Klímová, Ema Kynčlová, Tereza Baudyšová, coach: Radek Klíma	Ledolamky; Kristina Podrábská, Andrea Krupanská, Karolína Špundová, Denisa Poštová, alternate: Zuzana Pražáková, coach: Monika Podrábská	PLC 1 Natálie-Klaudie Koscelanská, Julie Přerovská, Valentýna Dušková, Klára Baudyšová, coach: Alžběta Baudyšová
2020	Dion XX; Julie Zelingrová, Kristýna Farková, Klára Koscelanská, Klára Baudyšová, alternate: Eliška Hercoková, coach: Petr Horák	Ledolamky; Kristina Podrábská, Andrea Krupanská, Zuzana Pražáková, Denisa Poštová, alternate: Karolína Špundová, coach: Monika Podrábská	Zbraslav Polární lišky Veronika Vašáková, Matylda Volfová, Sofie Krupičková, Emma Seifriedová, alternate: Veronika Faltusová, coach: Vojtěch Reitmajer

== See also ==
- Czech Men's Curling Championship
- Czech Women's Curling Championship
- Czech Mixed Curling Championship
- Czech Mixed Doubles Curling Championship
- Czech Junior Mixed Doubles Curling Championship
