= Czech Mixed Doubles Curling Championship =

National curling tournament in the Czech Republic

The Czech Mixed Doubles Curling Championship (Czech: MČR mixed doubles) is the national championship of mixed doubles curling (one man and one woman) in the Czech Republic. It has been held annually since the 2008–2009 season and organised by the Czech Curling Association.

== List of champions and medallists ==
Team line-ups shows in order: woman, man, coach (if exists).

Year, dates	Champion	Runner-up	Bronze
2008; Dec 5–7	Aritma 1 W: Anna Kubešková; M: Karel Kubeška	Ledoborci 1 W: Hana Čechová; M: Jiří Marša	Trutnov 2 W: Jana Jelínková; M: Miloš Hoferka
2009; Dec 18–20	Aritma 1 W: Anna Kubešková; M: Karel Kubeška coach: Jiří Candra	Aritma 2 W: Tereza Plíšková; M: Jiří Candra	Zbraslav H W: Zuzana Hájková; M: Tomáš Paul
2010; Dec 17–19	Zbraslav OH; W: Linda Klímová; M: Jan Sedlář	CC Letící kameny W: Hana Čechová; M: Radek Žďárský	Savona 2 W: Klára Svatoňová; M: Jakub Splavec
2011; Dec 16–18	Prague Tee Party; W: Sára Jahodová; M: Radek Boháč	Zbraslav TP; W: Petra Vinšová; M: Lukáš Klíma	Zbraslav R W: Irena Reitmajerová; M: Tomáš Válek
2012; Dec 14–16	Zbraslav H W: Zuzana Hájková; M: Tomáš Paul	MD CC Savona 3 W: Michaela Nádherová; M: Martin Štěpánek	Dion VIP; W: Eliška Srnská; M: Marek Černovský
2013; Dec 6–8	Zbraslav H W: Zuzana Hájková; M: Tomáš Paul	Savona 1 W: Karolína Frederiksen; M: Michal Zdenka	Zbraslav D W: Kamila Mošová; M: Martin Mulač
2014; Dec 12–14	Liboc 3 W: Anna Kubešková; M: Jiří Candra coach: Karel Kubeška	Liboc 1 W: Alžběta Baudyšová; M: Jan Zelingr coach: Kryštof Tabery	Savona 3 W: Karolína Frederiksen; M: Michal Zdenka
2015; Dec 4–6	Liboc 3 W: Anna Kubešková; M: Jiří Candra coach: Karel Kubeška	Trutnov 1 W: Jana Jelínková; M: Ondřej Mihola coach: Jiří Deyl	Savona 1 W: Michaela Nádherová; M: Jakub Bareš
2016; Dec 2–4	Zbraslav H W: Zuzana Hájková; M: Tomáš Paul	Savona 4 W: Petra Vinšová; M: Lukáš Klíma	Zbraslav Tabery; W: Eliška Srnská; M: Kryštof Tabery
2017; Oct 13–15; Dec 1–4	Zbraslav H W: Zuzana Hájková; M: Tomáš Paul	PLC LEDO; W: Jana Načeradská; M: Radek Boháč	Savona M W: Eva Málková; M: Dalibor Miklík
2019; Sep 28–30; Nov 30–Dec 2 Feb 1–3	Zbraslav H W: Zuzana Paulová; M: Tomáš Paul	Savona 1 W: Petra Vinšová; M: Lukáš Klíma	Savona M W: Eva Miklíková; M: Dalibor Miklík
2020; Sep 28–30; Nov 30–Dec 2 Feb 1–3	Zbraslav H W: Zuzana Paulová; M: Tomáš Paul coach: Jakub Bareš	Savona 5 W: Karolína Frederiksen; M: Radek Boháč	Savona M W: Eva Miklíková; M: Dalibor Miklík
2021; Sep 19–21	cancelled because COVID-19		
2022; Feb 26–Mar 1	Dion WC; W: Julie Zelingrová; M: Vít Chabičovský coach: Petr Horák	Zbraslav H W: Zuzana Paulová; M: Tomáš Paul coach: Jakub Bareš	Trutnov 1 W: Jana Jelínková; M: Ondřej Mihola

== Medal record for curlers ==
Curler	Gold	Silver	Bronze
Tomáš Paul	6	1	1
Zuzana Paulová (Hájková)	6	1	1
Anna Kubešková	4		
Jiří Candra	2	1	
Karel Kubeška	2		
Radek Boháč	1	2	
Vít Chabičovský	1		
Sára Jahodová	1		
Linda Klímová	1		
Jan Sedlář	1		
Julie Zelingrová	1		
Lukáš Klíma		3	
Petra Vinšová		3	
Karolína Frederiksen		2	1
Hana Čechová		2	
Jana Jelínková		1	2
Ondřej Mihola		1	1
Michaela Nádherová		1	1
Michal Zdenka		1	1
Alžběta Baudyšová		1	
Jiří Marša		1	
Jana Načeradská		1	
Tereza Plíšková		1	
Martin Štěpánek		1	
Radek Žďárský		1	
Jan Zelingr		1	
Dalibor Miklík			3
Eva Miklíková (Málková)			3
Eliška Srnská			2
Jakub Bareš			1
Marek Černovský			1
Miloš Hoferka			1
Kamila Mošová			1
Martin Mulač			1
Irena Reitmajerová			1
Jakub Splavec			1
Klára Svatoňová			1
Kryštof Tabery			1
Tomáš Válek			1

== See also ==
- Czech Men's Curling Championship
- Czech Women's Curling Championship
- Czech Mixed Curling Championship
- Czech Junior Curling Championships
- Czech Junior Mixed Doubles Curling Championship
