= Czech Mixed Curling Championship =

National curling tournament in the Czech Republic

The Czech Mixed Curling Championship (Czech: MČR mixy) is the national championship of mixed curling (two men and two women) in the Czech Republic. It has been held annually since the 1993–1994 season and organised by the Czech Curling Association.

== List of champions and medallists ==
Team line-ups in order: fourth, third, second, lead, alternate, coach; skips marked in bold.

| Year, dates | Champion | Runner-up | Bronze |
|---|---|---|---|
| 1993; Nov 20–21 | M BCC 2; **Radek Žďárský**, Miloš Plzák, Hana Čechová, Kateřina Jurková | M Aritma - Citadela; **Karel Kubeška**, Eva Šenfeldová, Ivan Kolínský, Jaroslava Koucká | M Montáž; **Renée Lepšíková**, Jitka Papežová, Pavel Toman, Pavel Málek |
| 1994 | CC Aritma/CC Citadela; **Karel Kubeška**, Eva Šenfeldová, Ivan Kolínský, Jaroslava Koucká | CC Citadela; **Lenka Šafránková**, David Netušil, Pavla Rubášová, Tomáš Muzikář, alternate: Jaroslav Kašpar | Bohemian CC 2; **Radek Žďárský**, Hana Špinková, Miloš Plzák, Kateřina Jurková |
| 1995 | Bohemian CC 2; **Radek Žďárský**, Hana Špinková, Miloš Plzák, Hana Plzáková | CC Aritma 1; **Karel Kubeška**, Miroslava Vařečková, Ivan Kolínský, Kristýna Mudrochová | CC Savona 2; **Jaroslav Šulc**, Helena Šulcová, Jiří Šimek, Alena Samueliová |
| 1996 | CC Aritma; **Jan Létal**, Miroslava Vařečková, Jiří Pelc, Kristýna Mudrochová | Bohemian CC H **Radek Žďárský**, Hana Špinková, Miloš Plzák, Hana Plzáková | CC Aritma/CC Citadela; **Karel Kubeška**, Pavla Rubášová, David Netušil, Věra Růžková |
| 1997 | CC Aritma/CC Citadela; **Karel Kubeška**, Pavla Rubášová, David Netušil, Věra Růžková | CC Kolibris 2; **David Šik**, Vendula Blažková, Milan Polívka, Hana Synáčková | CK Zlatá Praha 2; **Jana Linhartová**, Patrik Večeřa, Michaela Murínová, Michal Hejmalíček |
| 1998 | tournament was not held | | |
| 1999 | CC Aritma 2; **Karel Kubeška**, Pavla Rubášová, David Netušil, Věra Růžková | CC Kolibris 2; **Tereza Černá**, Jiří Chobot, Milan Polívka, Irena Polívková | CC Letící kameny Praha; **Radek Žďárský**, Monika Klímová, Miloš Plzák, Hana Plzáková |
| 2000 | CC Kolibris 3; **David Šik**, David Havlena, Karolína Pilařová, Vendula Blažková | CC Kolibris 1; **Karel Hradec**, Lucie Hladká, Pavel Menšík, Vlasta Nováková | 1.KCK Trutnov; **Jiří Lubina**, Jana Zingová, Daniela Munzarová ml., Miloš Hoferka |
| 2001—2002 | Tournament was not held | | |
| 2003 | KOSA; **Michaela Souhradová**, Marek David, Karolína Pilařová, David Šik | 1.KCK Trutnov; **Lenka Hubková**, Ivan Prouza, Lenka Černovská, Miloš Hoferka | CC Letící kameny Praha; **Martin Krejčí**, Hana Plzáková, Miloš Plzák, Hana Čechová |
| 2004 | CC Kolibris 1+2; **Michaela Souhradová**, Erik Šik, Anna Cermanová, David Šik | CC Přední hrábě **Andrea Dlabalová**, Jiří Snítil, Jana Šafaříková, Marek Vydra | 1.KCK Trutnov; **Vít Zinga**, Miroslava Vařečková, Jiří Lubina, Jana Zingová |
| 2005 | CC Kolibris XP; **Karel Hradec**, Jana Medřická, Marek Brožek, Tereza Matásková, alternate: Lukáš Plachý | CC Kolibris 1; **David Šik**, Michala Souhradová, Pavel Menšík, Anna Cermanová | Prague Tee Party; **Vít Nekovařík**, Hana Synáčková, Vlastimil Vojtuš, Karolína Pilařová |
| 2006; Apr 8–10 | 1.CK Brno; **Petr Kovač**, Šárka Pavelková, Aleš Jelínek, Martina Pavelková | Tee Party; **Vít Nekovařík**, Hana Synáčková, Vlastimil Vojtuš, Karolína Pilařová | Zlapra; **Zdeněk Vyjídáček**, Jana Vyjídáčková, Pavel Málek, Adéla Čaňová |
| 2007; Apr 7–9 | Aritma (K.Kubeška); **Renée Lepšíková**, Luděk Munzar, Miroslava Vařečková, Karel Kubeška | Zbraslav (R.Klíma); **Radek Klíma**, Linda Klimová, Tomáš Válek, Agáta Kadeřávková | Kolibris; Michala Souhradová, Erik Šik, Eva Štampachová, **David Šik** |
| 2008 | tournament was not held | | |
| 2009; May 1–3 | Savona (J.Bareš); **Jakub Bareš**, Lenka Kitzbergerová, Jindřich Kitzberger, Michaela Nádherová | Dion (V.Nekovařík); **Vít Nekovařík**, Lenka Černovská, Karel Uher, Kateřina Urbanová | Savona (J.Kováč); **Jakub Kováč**, Zuzana Hájková, Jiří Deyl, Iveta Janatová |
| 2010; Apr 30 – May 2 | Dion (P.Horák); Radek Boháč, Sára Jahodová, **Petr Horák**, Klára Boušková, alternate: Lenka Černovská | Kolibris; **David Šik**, Eva Štampachová, Pavel Menšík, Michala Souhradová | Trutnov (V.Zinga); **Vít Zinga**, Kristýna Matějíčková, Jiří Lubina, Renata Matějíčková |
| 2011; May 6–8 | Aritma 1; **Kryštof Chaloupek**, Eliška Jalovcová, David Jirounek, Luisa Illková, coach: Anna Kubešková | Kolibris; **David Šik**, Eva Štampachová, Karel Uher, Michala Souhradová, coach: Sune Frederiksen | Tee Party S K **Jiří Marša**, Lenka Černovská, Vlastimil Vojtuš, Barbora Vojtušová, alternates: Vladimír Černovský, Monika Podrábská |
| 2012; May 5–7 | Kolibris 1; **David Šik**, Eva Štampachová, Marek David, Michala Souhradová, alternate: Klára Boušková | Aritma 1; **Karel Kubeška**, Tereza Plíšková, Jiří Candra, Anna Kubešková | Ledoborci 1; **Jiří Marša**, Eliška Jalovcová, Tomáš Paul, Luisa Illková |
| 2013; May 3–5 | Savona 1 (J.Bareš); **Jakub Bareš**, Lenka Kitzbergerová, Martin Štěpánek, Michaela Nádherová, alternate: Karolína Frederiksen | Aritma 1 (K.Kubeška); **Karel Kubeška**, Anna Kubešková, Jiří Candra, Tereza Plíšková | Ledoborci 1 (J. Marša); **Jiří Marša**, Eliška Jalovcová, Jaroslav Vedral, Luisa Illková |
| 2014; May 2–4 | Savona 3 (J.Bareš); **Jakub Bareš**, Lenka Kitzbergerová, Jindřich Kitzberger, Michaela Nádherová | Liboc (K.Kubeška); Anna Kubešková, **Karel Kubeška**, Tereza Plíšková, Jiří Candra | Trutnov (M.Hoferka); **Miloš Hoferka**, Pavlína Čížková, Ondřej Mihola, Zuzana Hálová |
| 2015; May 1–3 | Savona 2 (L.Klíma); **Lukáš Klíma**, Petra Vinšová, Samuel Mokriš, Martina Kajanová, Štěpán Hron | Zbraslav H (T.Paul); **Tomáš Paul**, Kamila Mulačová, Martin Mulač, Helena Hajkova, alternate: Zuzana Hájková | Savona 1 (M.Strnadová); Michal Zdenka, Martina Strnadová, **Sune Frederiksen**, Karolína Frederiksen |
| 2016; Apr 29 – May 1 | Savona 1 (J.Bareš); **Jakub Bareš**, Lenka Kitzbergerová, Jindřich Kitzberger, Michaela Nádherová, alternate: Jiří Snítil | Dion VIP (M.Černovský); Marek Cernovský, Lenka Černovská, **Vladimír Černovský**, Dana Chabičovská, alternate: Jana Wenzlová | Savona 2 (S.Mokriš); **Samuel Mokriš**, Alžběta Baudyšová, Jan Zelingr, Martina Kajanová, alternate: Petra Vinšová |
| 2017; Mar 3–5 | 1.CK Brno (J.Bareš); **Jakub Bareš**, Lenka Kitzbergerová, Jindřich Kitzberger, Michaela Nádherová, coach: Jiří Candra | Dion YB (J.Vedral); **Jaroslav Vedral**, Andrea Krupanská, Lukáš Klípa, Denisa Poštová, coach: Jiří Candra | Ledoborci 7 (M.Dolejší); Michal Dolejší, **Lenka Hronová**, Pavel Krofika, Alena Pokorná, coach: Jiří Candra |
| 2018; Mar 23–25 | Savona 1 (L.Klíma); **Lukáš Klíma**, Petra Vinšová, Marek Cernovský, Michaela Baudyšová | Dion YB (J.Vedral); **Jaroslav Vedral**, Andrea Krupanská, Lukáš Klípa, Denisa Poštová, coach: Jiří Candra | RPK Brno M (L.Merta); **Lukáš Merta**, Anna Hlaváčová, Petr Hlaváč, Tereza Mertová |
| 2019; Mar 29–31 | Savona 1 (L.Klíma); **Lukáš Klíma**, Petra Vinšová, Marek Cernovský, Michaela Baudyšová | Savona M (D.Miklík); Dalibor Miklík, **Eva Miklíková**, Samuel Mokriš, Martina Kajanová | Ledoborci Juniors (K.Podrábská); **Kristina Podrábská**, Dominik Švarc, Zuzana Pražáková, Pavel Mareš, coach: Tomáš Kup |
| 2020; Mar 27–29 | Tournament was not held because of COVID-19 | | |

== See also ==
- Czech Men's Curling Championship
- Czech Women's Curling Championship
- Czech Mixed Doubles Curling Championship
- Czech Junior Curling Championships
- Czech Junior Mixed Doubles Curling Championship
