= Radek Boháč =

Czech curler and coach (born 1977)

- Curler ♂
- Born: 26 December 1977 (age 48); Prague, Czechoslovakia

Team
- Curling club: CC Dion, Prague, Pražský Lední Club, Prague

Curling career
- Member Association: Czech Republic
- World Championship: 4 (2022, 2023, 2024, 2025)
- European Championship: 8 (2015, 2018, 2019, 2021, 2022, 2023, 2024, 2025)
- Olympic: 1 (2026)
- Other appearances: European Mixed Championship: 1 (2010), Winter Universiade: 1 (2003)

Radek Boháč (born 26 December 1977 in Prague) is a Czech curler and coach.

At the national level, he is a Czech men's champion curler (2018), Czech mixed champion curler (2010) and Czech mixed doubles champion curler (2011).

== Personal life ==
He started curling in 2001 at the age of 24. Boháč works as a referent and has two children.

== Teams ==
=== Men's ===
Season	Skip	Third	Second	Lead	Alternate	Coach	Events
2002–03	Petr Štěpánek	Jirí Snítil	Petr Firt	Marek David	Radek Boháč	Karel Kubeška	WUG 2003 (8th)
2004–05	Petr Horák	Radek Boháč	Pavel Menšík	Ondřej Mihola			CMCC 2004 (5th)
2005–06	Petr Horák	Radek Boháč	Ondřej Mihola	Ondřej Hurtík			CMCC 2005 (6th)
2006–07	Radek Boháč	Petr Horák	Miloš Hoferka	Ondřej Mihola			
2007–08	Radek Boháč (fourth)	Miloš Hoferka (skip)	Petr Horák	Ondřej Mihola	Radek Cerman		CMCC 2008 (4th)
2008–09	Vít Nekovařík	Radek Boháč	Petr Horák	Marek David			
2011–12	David Šik	Radek Boháč	Karel Uher	Milan Polívka	Marek David	Sune Frederiksen	CMCC 2012 (silver)
2012–13	David Šik	Radek Boháč	Karel Uher	Milan Polívka	Sune Frederiksen		CMCC 2013 (bronze)
2013–14	David Šik	Radek Boháč	Tomáš Paul	Milan Polívka	Marek David		CMCC 2014 (silver)
2014–15	David Šik	Radek Boháč	Tomáš Paul	Milan Polívka	Erik Šik		CMCC 2015 (silver)
2015–16	David Šik	Radek Boháč	Tomáš Paul	Erik Sik	Kryštof Chaloupek	Brad Askew	ECC 2015 (9th)
2015–16	David Šik	Radek Boháč	Tomáš Paul	Milan Polívka			
2016–17	David Šik	Tomáš Paul	Milan Polívka	Radek Boháč	Erik Šik		CMCC 2017 (bronze)
2017–18	David Šik	Radek Boháč	Tomáš Paul	Milan Polívka	Erik Šik		CMCC 2018 (gold)
2018–19	David Šik	Radek Boháč	Tomáš Paul	Milan Polívka	Lukáš Klípa	Shannon Kleibrink	ECC 2018 (13th)
2018–19	David Šik	Radek Boháč	Tomáš Paul	Erik Šik	David Havlena		CMCC 2019 (silver)
2019–20	Lukáš Klíma	Marek Černovský	Jiří Candra	Samuel Mokriš	Radek Boháč	Craig Savill	ECC 2019 (11th)
2019–20	David Šik	Radek Boháč	Krystof Tabery	Milan Polívka			
2019–20	David Šik	Radek Boháč	Tomáš Paul	Milan Polívka	Erik Šik		CMCC 2020 (silver)
2021–22	Lukáš Klíma	Marek Černovský	Radek Boháč	Jiří Candra	Samuel Mokriš	Craig Savill	ECC 2021 (7th); OQE 2021 (bronze); CMCC 2022 (gold); WMCC 2022 (9th)
2022–23	Lukáš Klíma	Marek Černovský	Radek Boháč	Martin Jurík	Lukáš Klípa	Craig Savill	ECC 2022 (7th); CMCC 2023 (gold); WMCC 2023 (10th)
2023–24	Lukáš Klíma	Marek Černovský	Martin Jurík	Lukáš Klípa	Radek Boháč	Craig Savill	ECC 2023 (8th); CMCC 2024 (gold); WMCC 2024 (9th)
2024–25	Lukáš Klíma	Marek Černovský	Martin Jurík	Lukáš Klípa	Radek Boháč	Craig Savill	ECC 2024 (8th); CMCC 2025 (gold); WMCC 2025 (7th)
2025–26	Lukáš Klíma	Marek Černovský	Martin Jurík	Lukáš Klípa	Radek Boháč	Craig Savill	ECC 2025 (6th); WOG 2026 (8th); WMCC 2026 (10th)

=== Mixed ===
Season	Skip	Third	Second	Lead	Alternate	Events
2006–07	Lenka Černovská (fourth)	Petr Horák (skip)	Kateřina Urbanová	Radek Boháč		CMxCC 2007 (5th)
2009–10	Radek Boháč (fourth)	Sára Jahodová	Petr Horák (skip)	Klára Boušková	Lenka Černovská	CMxCC 2010 (gold)
2010–11	Radek Boháč	Sára Jahodová	Petr Horák	Klára Boušková	Lenka Černovská, Marek Cernovský	EMxCC 2010 (11th)
2011–12	Radek Boháč	Kamila Mošová	Martin Mulač	Sára Jahodová	Jana Šafaříková	CMxCC 2012 (4th)
2012–13	Radek Boháč	Kamila Mošová	Martin Mulač	Sára Jahodová	Jana Šafaříková	CMxCC 2013 (6th)

=== Mixed doubles ===
Season	Female	Male	Events
2008–09	Karolína Frederiksen	Radek Boháč	CMDCC 2008 (10th)
2011–12	Sára Jahodová	Radek Boháč	CMDCC 2011 (gold)
2016–17	Jana Načeradská	Radek Boháč	CMDCC 2016 (9th)
2017–18	Jana Načeradská	Radek Boháč	CMDCC 2017 (silver)
2018–19	Jana Načeradská	Radek Boháč	
2019–20	Karolína Frederiksen	Radek Boháč	CMDCC 2020 (silver)
2020–21	Jana Načeradská	Radek Boháč	CMDCC 2021 (???th)

== Record as a coach of national teams ==
Year	Tournament, event	National team	Place
2014	2014 European Curling Championships	Slovakia (women)	20
2015	2015 World Mixed Curling Championship	England (mixed)	30
