= Jiří Candra =

Czech curler and coach (born 1986)

- Curler ♂
- Born: 16 April 1986 (age 40); Prague

Team
- Curling club: CC Sokol Liboc, Prague
- Skip: Lukáš Klíma
- Third: Marek Černovský
- Second: Radek Boháč
- Lead: Jiří Candra
- Alternate: Lukáš Klípa
- Mixed doubles partner: Anna Kubešková

Curling career
- Member Association: Czech Republic
- World Championship: 1 (2022)
- World Mixed Doubles Championship: 1 (2016)
- European Championship: 4 (2005, 2016, 2019, 2021)
- Other appearances: Winter Universiade: 2 (2011, 2013), World Junior Championships: 1 (2007)
Medal record
Curling
Winter Universiade
Bronze medal – third place	2011 Erzurum
Czech Men's Championship
Gold medal – first place	2016
Gold medal – first place	2019
Gold medal – first place	2020
Bronze medal – third place	2012

Jiří Candra (born 16 April 1986 in Prague) is a Czech curler and curling coach.

At the national level, he is a three-time Czech men's champion curler (2016, 2019, 2020) and two-time Czech mixed doubles champion curler (2014, 2015).

He works as curling ice technician (icemaker).

== Teams ==
=== Men's ===
Season	Skip	Third	Second	Lead	Alternate	Coach	Events
2002–03	Jiří Candra	Filip Skála	Šimon Slavík	Petr Král			CJCC 2003 (7 место)
2003–04	Ondřej Hurtík	Kryštof Chaloupek	Jiří Candra	Michal Láznička			CJCC 2004 (silver)
2004–05	Ondřej Hurtík	Kryštof Chaloupek	Jiří Candra	Michal Láznička			CJCC 2005 (gold)
2005–06	David Sik	Erik Sik	Pavel Mensik	Milan Polivka	Jiří Candra	Jiří Candra, David Sik	ECC 2005 (13th)
2005–06	Ondřej Hurtík	Jakub Bareš	Jiří Candra	Michal Láznička	Kryštof Chaloupek	Karel Kubeška	EJCC 2006 (bronze)
2005–06	Ondřej Hurtík	Jiří Candra	Kryštof Chaloupek	Michal Láznička			CJCC 2006 (silver)
2006–07	Jakub Bareš	Jiří Candra	Martin Hejhal	Martin Štěpánek	Ondřej Hurtík	Karel Kubeška	EJCC 2007 (silver); WJCC 2007 (10th)
2010–11	Jiří Candra	Tomáš Paul	David Jirounek	Kryštof Chaloupek			
2010–11	Lukáš Klíma	Jiří Candra	Tomáš Paul	David Jirounek	Kryštof Chaloupek	Karel Kubeška	WUG 2011 (bronze)
2011–12	Karel Kubeška	Jiří Candra	David Jirounek	Ondřej Nývlt		Anna Kubešková	CMCC 2012 (bronze)
2013–14	Lukáš Klíma	Jiří Candra	Tomáš Paul	David Jirounek	Martin Jurík	Kryštof Chaloupek	WUG 2013 (7th)
2013–14	Lukáš Klíma	Tomáš Paul	Jiří Candra	David Jirounek	Martin Jurík		
2013–14	Jiří Candra (fourth)	Karel Kubeška (skip)	David Jirounek	Tomáš Zelenka		Anna Kubešková	CMCC 2014 (6th)
2014–15	Jiří Candra (fourth)	Karel Kubeška (skip)	Martin Jurík	David Jirounek	Tomáš Zelenka	Anna Kubešková	CMCC 2015 (6th)
2015–16	Jiří Candra (fourth)	Karel Kubeška (skip)	Martin Jurík	David Jirounek		Anna Kubešková	CMCC 2016 (gold)
2016–17	Jiří Candra (fourth)	Karel Kubeška (skip)	Martin Jurík	David Jirounek	Lukáš Klíma	Rickard Hallström	ECC 2016 (13th)
2016–17	Karel Kubeška	Jiří Candra	Martin Jurík	Lukáš Klíma	David Jirounek		
2016–17	Jiří Candra (fourth)	Karel Kubeška (skip)	Martin Jurík	David Jirounek			CMCC 2017 (4th)
2017–18	Jiří Candra	Michal Dolejsi	Martin Bukovsky	Pavel Krofika	Jan Tuik		
2017–18	Lukáš Klíma	Jiří Candra	Marek Černovský	Jakub Bareš			
2018–19	Lukáš Klíma	Jiří Candra	Marek Černovský	Samuel Mokriš			
2018–19	Lukáš Klíma	Marek Černovský	Jiří Candra	Samuel Mokriš		Lenka Černovská	CMCC 2019 (gold)
2019–20	Lukáš Klíma	Marek Černovský	Jiří Candra	Samuel Mokriš	Radek Boháč	Craig Savill	ECC 2019 (11th)
2019–20	Lukáš Klíma	Marek Černovský	Jiří Candra	Samuel Mokriš		Jan Zelingr	CMCC 2020 (gold)
2021–22	Lukáš Klíma	Marek Černovský	Radek Boháč	Jiří Candra	Samuel Mokriš	Craig Savill	ECC 2021 (7th)

=== Mixed ===
Season	Skip	Third	Second	Lead	Alternate	Events
2005–06	Veronika Herdová (fourth)	Michal Láznička	Luisa Illková	Jiří Candra		CMxCC 2007 (4th)
2008–09	Jiří Candra	Luisa Illková	Ondřej Nývlt	Veronika Kramlová	Michal Láznička	CMxCC 2009 (18th)
2009–10	Karel Kubeška	Anna Kubešková	Jiří Candra	Tereza Plíšková		CMxCC 2010 (9th)
2010–11	Jiří Candra	Kamila Mošová	Martin Mulač	Kateřina Urbanová		CMxCC 2011 (7th)
2011–12	Karel Kubeška	Tereza Plíšková	Jiří Candra	Anna Kubešková		CMxCC 2012 (silver)
2012–13	Karel Kubeška	Anna Kubešková	Jiří Candra	Tereza Plíšková		CMxCC 2013 (silver)
2013–14	Anna Kubešková (fourth)	Karel Kubeška (skip)	Tereza Plíšková	Jiří Candra		CMxCC 2014 (silver)
2014–15	Jiří Candra (fourth)	Anna Kubešková	Karel Kubeška (skip)	Tereza Plíšková	Klára Svatoňová, Martin Jurík	CMxCC 2015 (6th)
2015–16	Jiří Candra	Ežen Kolčevská	Martin Blahovec	Klára Svatoňová		CMxCC 2016 (8th)
2016–17	Jiří Candra (fourth)	Martina Strnadová	Sune Frederiksen (skip)	Karolína Frederiksen	Michal Zdenka	CMxCC 2017 (5th)
2018–19	Jiří Candra	Laura Klímová	Martin Blahovec	Luisa Klímová		CMxCC 2019 (7th)

=== Mixed doubles ===
Season	Female	Male	Coach	Events
2009–10	Tereza Plíšková	Jiří Candra		CMDCC 2009 (silver)
2011–12	Tereza Plíšková	Jiří Candra		CMDCC 2011 (10th)
2012–13	Anna Candrová	Jiří Candra		CMDCC 2012 (17th)
2013–14	Anna Candrová	Jiří Candra		CMDCC 2013 (7th)
2014–15	Anna Kubešková	Jiří Candra	Karel Kubeška	CMDCC 2014 (gold)
2015–16	Anna Kubešková	Jiří Candra	Karel Kubeška	CMDCC 2015 (gold); WMDCC 2016 (21st)

== Record as a coach of national teams ==
Year	Tournament, event	National team	Place
2005	2005 European Curling Championships	Czech Republic (men)	13
2009	2009 European Junior Curling Challenge	Czech Republic (junior women)	2nd place, silver medalist(s)
2009	2009 World Junior Curling Championships	Czech Republic (junior women)	7
2010	2010 World Junior Curling Championships	Czech Republic (junior women)	8
2010	2010 World Mixed Doubles Curling Championship	Czech Republic (mixed double)	9
2017	2017 World Mixed Curling Championship	Czech Republic (mixed team)	3rd place, bronze medalist(s)

== Personal life ==
He started curling in 2002 at the age of 16.
