= Czech Men's Curling Championship =

National curling tournament in the Czech Republic

The Czech Men's Curling Championship (Czech: MČR muži) is the national championship of men's curling in the Czech Republic. It has been held annually since 1991 and organized by the Czech Curling Association.

== List of champions ==
Teams line-up in order: fourth, third, second, lead, alternate, coach; skips marked in bold.

| Year | Champion | Runner-up | Bronze |
|---|---|---|---|
| 1991 | Bohemian CC; **Radek Klíma**, Tomáš Klíma, Miloš Plzák, Radek Žďárský | CK Kolín; **Martin Binder**, Karel Havlíček, Miroslav Kubera, Daniel Frolec | CC TJ Jiskra Petřiny; **Michal Hejmalíček**, Michal Motl, Tomáš Válek, Pavel Polák |
| 1992 | Bohemian CC; **Radek Klíma**, Tomáš Klíma, Miloš Plzák, Radek Žďárský | CC Zbraslav; **Jan Létal**, Jiří Pelc, Karel Kubeška, Ivan Kolínský, alternate: Jiří Daněk | CC TJ Armabeton Praha; **František Frolec**, Daniel Frolec, Pavel Toman, František Vokatý, alternate: Pavel Málek |
| 1993 | Bohemian CC; **Radek Klíma**, Tomáš Klíma, Miloš Plzák, Radek Žďárský | CK Kolín team line-up N/A | CC Aritma team line-up N/A |
| 1994 | Bohemian CC R **Radek Klíma**, Tomáš Klíma, Miloš Plzák, Radek Žďárský, alternate: Robert O´Leary | CK Kolín 1; **Martin Binder**, Karel Havlíček, Dušan Jurčík, Miroslav Kubera, alternates: Daniel Frolec, Zdeněk Vyjídáček | CC Aritma team line-up N/A |
| 1995 | Bohemian CC D **David Šik**, Milan Polívka, Karel Hradec, Pavel Menšík, alternate: David Havlena | Bohemian CC R **Radek Klíma**, Tomáš Klíma, Miloš Plzák, Radek Žďárský, alternate: Robert O´Leary | CK Kolín 1; **Karel Havlíček**, František Frolec, Dušan Jurčík, Miroslav Kubera, alternates: Zdeněk Vyjídáček, Martin Binder |
| 1996 | Bohemian CC R **Radek Klíma**, Tomáš Klíma, Miloš Plzák, Radek Žďárský | CK Kolín 1; **Karel Havlíček**, Oldřich Michna, Dušan Jurčík, Pavel Málek, alternate: Miroslav Kubera | Bohemian CC D **David Šik**, Milan Polívka, Karel Hradec, Pavel Menšík, alternate: David Havlena |
| 1997 | CC Kolibris 1; **David Šik**, Milan Polívka, Karel Hradec, Pavel Menšík, alternate: David Havlena | Bohemian CC R **Radek Klíma**, Tomáš Klíma, Miloš Plzák, Radek Žďárský | CK Zlatá Praha 1; **Karel Havlíček**, Zdeněk Vyjídáček, Dušan Jurčík, Pavel Málek, alternate: Miroslav Kubera |
| 1998 | CC Kolibris 1; **David Šik**, Milan Polívka, Karel Hradec, Pavel Menšík, alternate: David Havlena | CK Zlatá Praha 2; **Radek Klíma**, Tomáš Klíma, Patrik Večeřa, František Vokatý, alternates: Tomáš Válek, Michal Hejmalíček | CK Zlatá Praha 1; **Karel Havlíček**, Zdeněk Vyjídáček, Dušan Jurčík, Pavel Málek, alternate: Miroslav Kubera |
| 1999 | CC Aritma; **Karel Kubeška**, Jan Létal, Jiří Pelc, David Netušil, alternate: Libor Svatoň | CC Kolibris 1; **David Šik**, Milan Polívka, Karel Hradec, Pavel Menšík, alternate: David Havlena | CC Letící kameny Praha; **David Rys**, Jan Fencl, Radek Žďárský, Miloš Plzák, alternates: Ivan Poledník, Pavel Houdek, Tomáš Čondl |
| 2000 | CC Aritma; **Karel Kubeška**, Jan Létal, Jiří Pelc, David Netušil | CC Savona 2; **Vlastimil Vojtuš**, Petr Štěpánek, Aleš Prchlík, Ondřej Šajner, alternates: Vít Nekovařík, Luboš Kitzberger | CC Kolibris 1; **David Šik**, Milan Polívka, Karel Hradec, Pavel Menšík |
| 2001 | CC Savona 2; **Vlastimil Vojtuš**, Petr Štěpánek, Aleš Prchlík, Aleš Jindřich, alternate: Vít Nekovařík | CK Zlatá Praha; **Tomáš Válek**, Michal Hejmalíček, Patrik Večeřa, Tomáš Klíma, alternate: Radek Klíma | CC Kolibris 1; **David Šik**, Milan Polívka, Erik Šik, Pavel Menšík |
| 2002 | Kolibris 1; **David Šik**, Milan Polívka, Erik Šik, Pavel Menšík, alternate: Vladimír Čtveráček | Letící kameny **Radek Žďárský**, Miloš Plzák, Ivan Poledník, Jan Fencl, alternate: Jiří Suchý | CC Aritma; **Karel Kubeška**, Jan Létal, Jiří Pelc, David Netušil, alternate: Iain Dykes |
| 2003 | CC Kolibris 4M; **Jiří Snítil**, Jindřich Kitzberger, Martin Snítil, Marek Vydra, alternate: David Havlena | Letící kameny **Radek Žďárský**, Miloš Plzák, Ivan Poledník, Jan Fencl, alternate: Jiří Suchý | CC Aritma; **Karel Kubeška**, Jan Létal, David Netušil, Iain Dykes |
| 2004 | CC Aritma; **Karel Kubeška**, Jan Létal, David Netušil, Jiří Lubina | Kolibris 1; **David Šik**, Milan Polívka, Erik Šik, Vladimír Čtveráček | CC Kolibris 4M; **Jiří Snítil**, Martin Snítil, Jindřich Kitzberger, Marek Vydra, alternate: David Havlena |
| 2005 | Kolibris 1; **David Šik**, Erik Šik, Pavel Menšík, Milan Polívka | Savona 2; **Vít Nekovařík**, Marek David, Karel Uher, Aleš Prchlík, alternate: Petr Štěpánek | CC Kolibris 4M; **Jiří Snítil**, Martin Snítil, Jindřich Kitzberger, Marek Vydra |
| 2006 | Sem Tam Brno; **Jiří Snítil**, Martin Snítil, Jindřich Kitzberger, Marek Vydra | Savona 2; **Vít Nekovařík**, Marek David, Karel Uher, Petr Štěpánek, alternate: Aleš Prchlík | Kolibris 1; **David Šik**, Erik Šik, Pavel Menšík, Milan Polívka |
| 2007 | Sem Tam Brno; **Jiří Snítil**, Martin Snítil, Jindřich Kitzberger, Marek Vydra | Kolibris 1; **David Šik**, Erik Šik, Pavel Menšík, Milan Polívka | Zbraslav R **Radek Klíma**, Tomáš Klíma, Tomáš Válek, Michal Hejmalíček, alternate: Sune Frederiksen |
| 2008 | Sem Tam Brno; **Jiří Snítil**, Jindřich Kitzberger, Martin Snítil, Marek Vydra | Kolibris 1; **David Šik**, Erik Šik, Pavel Menšík, Milan Polívka | Zbraslav R **Radek Klíma**, Tomáš Válek, Tomáš Klíma, Tomáš Paul, alternate: Jan Samueli |
| 2009 | Sem Tam Brno; **Jiří Snítil**, Martin Snítil, Jindřich Kitzberger, Marek Vydra, alternate: Karel Uher, coach: Sune Frederiksen | Kolibris 2; **Karel Hradec**, Marek Brožek, Václav Pořt, Jiří Chobot, alternate: Antonín Kalný | Zbraslav R **Radek Klíma**, Tomáš Klíma, Tomáš Paul, Jan Samueli, alternate/coach: Tomáš Válek |
| 2010 | Sem Tam Brno; **Jiří Snítil**, Martin Snítil, Jindřich Kitzberger, Marek Vydra, alternate: Karel Uher | Kolibris 1; **David Šik**, Marek David, Pavel Menšík, Milan Polívka, alternate: Erik Šik | Savona 4 Jakub Bareš, **Michal Vojtuš**, Martin Hejhal, Martin Štěpánek, alternate: Libor Čeloud, coach: Petr Šulc |
| 2011 | Sem Tam Brno; **Jiří Snítil**, Martin Snítil, Jindřich Kitzberger, Marek Vydra | Zbraslav R **Radek Klíma**, Tomáš Válek, Tomáš Paul, Jan Samueli, alternate: Tomáš Klíma | Savona 4 Jakub Bareš, **Michal Vojtuš**, Martin Hejhal, Martin Štěpánek, alternate: Libor Čeloud, coach: Sune Frederiksen |
| 2012 | Sem Tam Brno; **Jiří Snítil**, Martin Snítil, Jindřich Kitzberger, Marek Vydra | Kolibris 1; **David Šik**, Radek Boháč, Karel Uher, Milan Polívka, alternate: Marek David, coach: Sune Frederiksen | Aritma 1; **Karel Kubeška**, Jiří Candra, David Jirounek, Ondřej Nývlt, coach: Anna Kubešková |
| 2013 | Sem Tam Brno; **Jiří Snítil**, Martin Snítil, Jakub Bareš, Jindřich Kitzberger, alternate: Marek Vydra | Dion X **Marek Černovský**, Petr Horák, Kryštof Krupanský, Štěpán Hron, alternate: Jan Zelingr, coach: Petr Horák | Kolibris 1; **David Šik**, Radek Boháč, Karel Uher, Milan Polívka, alternate: Sune Frederiksen |
| 2014 | Sem Tam Brno; **Jiří Snítil**, Martin Snítil, Jakub Bareš, Jindřich Kitzberger, alternate: Marek Vydra | Kolibris 1; **David Šik**, Radek Boháč, Tomáš Paul, Milan Polívka, alternate: Marek David | Duh.jedn. **Lukáš Klíma**, Kryštof Chaloupek, Ondřej Hurtík, Samuel Mokriš |
| 2015 | Sem Tam Brno; **Jiří Snítil**, Lukáš Klíma, Martin Snítil, Jindřich Kitzberger | Kolibris 1; **David Šik**, Radek Boháč, Tomáš Paul, Milan Polívka, alternate: Erik Šik | Duh.jedn. **Kryštof Chaloupek**, Ondřej Hurtík, Samuel Mokriš, Jan Zelingr |
| 2016 | Liboc; Jiří Candra, **Karel Kubeška**, Martin Jurík, David Jirounek, coach: Anna Kubešková | Duhoví Jednorožci; **Kryštof Chaloupek**, Marek Černovský, Samuel Mokriš, Ondřej Hálek, alternate: Ondřej Hurtík, coach: Vladimír Černovský | Sem Tam Brno; Lukáš Klíma, **Jiří Snítil**, Martin Snítil, Jindřich Kitzberger |
| 2017 | Sem Tam Brno; **Jiří Snítil**, Lukáš Klíma, Martin Snítil, Jindřich Kitzberger | Tabery - Zbraslav; **Kryštof Tabery**, Marek Černovský, Samuel Mokriš, Ondřej Hurtík, alternate: Ondřej Hálek, coach: Vladimír Černovský | Kolibris 1; **David Šik**, Tomáš Paul, Milan Polívka, Radek Boháč, alternate: Erik Šik |
| 2018 | Kolibris 1; **David Šik**, Radek Boháč, Tomáš Paul, Milan Polívka, alternate: Erik Šik | Tabery - Zbraslav; **Kryštof Tabery**, Marek Černovský, Samuel Mokriš, Ondřej Hurtík, coach: Vladimír Černovský | Sem Tam Brno; **Lukáš Klíma**, Jiří Snítil, Martin Snítil, Jindřich Kitzberger, alternate: Jakub Bareš |
| 2019 | Sem Tam Brno; **Lukáš Klíma**, Marek Černovský, Jiří Candra, Samuel Mokriš, coach: Lenka Černovská | Kolibris 1; **David Šik**, Radek Boháč, Tomáš Paul, Erik Šik, alternate: David Havlena | Dion YB; **Jaroslav Vedral**, Martin Blahovec, Pavel Mareš, Lukáš Klípa, coach: Tomáš Kup |
| 2020 | Zbraslav Klíma; **Lukáš Klíma**, Marek Černovský, Jiří Candra, Samuel Mokriš, coach: Jan Zelingr | Kolibris 1; **David Šik**, Radek Boháč, Tomáš Paul, Milan Polívka, alternate: Erik Šik | Liboc; Martin Jurík, **Karel Kubeška**, David Jirounek, Ondřej Hálek, alternate: Jakub Splavec |
| 2021 | cancelled because COVID-19 | | |
| 2022 | Zbraslav Klíma; **Lukáš Klíma**, Samuel Mokriš, Jiří Candra, Marek Černovský, alternate: Radek Boháč, coach: Jan Zelingr | Kolibris 2; **Karel Hradec**, Michal Zdenka, Martin Štěpánek, Václav Pořt, alternates: Jiří Chobot, Marek Brožek | Kolibris NG; **David Šik**, Erik Šik, Jakub Hanák, Jakub Rychlý, alternates:: Milan Polívka, Matěj Koudelka |
| 2023 | Zbraslav Klíma; **Lukáš Klíma**, Marek Černovský, Radek Boháč, Lukáš Klípa, alternate: Martin Jurík, coach: Jan Zelingr | Kolibris NG; **David Šik**, Jakub Hanák, Kryštof Tabery, Erik Šik, Milan Polivka | Zbraslav OH; **Tomáš Paul**, Karel Klíma, Jan Sedlár, Jakub Skála, alternate: Martin Mulač |
| 2024 | Zbraslav Klíma; **Lukáš Klíma**, Marek Černovský, Martin Jurík, Lukáš Klípa, alternate: Radek Boháč, coach: Jan Zelingr | DION ALPHA; **Marek Bříza**, Vít Chabičovský, Aleš Hercok, David Jakl, alternate: Jakub Hanák, coach: Sune Frederiksen | DYB VEDRAL; **Martin Blahovec**, David Škacha, Jaroslav Vedral, Oliver Kobian, alternate: David Verner, coach: Jaroslav Vedral |
| 2025 | Zbraslav Klíma; **Lukáš Klíma**, Marek Černovský, Martin Jurík, Lukáš Klípa, alternate: Radek Boháč, coach: Jan Zelingr | DION ALPHA; **Vít Chabičovský**, Jakub Hanák, Aleš Hercok, David Jakl, alternate: Martin Blahovec | Zbraslav OH; **Karel Klíma**, Tomáš Paul, Jan Sedlár, Jakub Skála, alternate: Dalibor Miklík |
| 2026 | Dukla Zbraslav; **Lukáš Klíma**, Marek Černovský, Lukáš Klípa, Martin Jurík, alternate: Radek Bohač | Zbraslav OH; **Dalibor Miklík**, Tomáš Paul, Jan Sedlár, Jakub Skála, alternate: Karel Klima | Lucky Stones; **Danila Liamaev**, Vojtěch Reitmajer, Tomáš Válek, Miloš Hoferka, alternate: Lukáš Jirousek |

== See also ==
- Czech Women's Curling Championship
- Czech Mixed Curling Championship
- Czech Mixed Doubles Curling Championship
- Czech Junior Curling Championships
- Czech Junior Mixed Doubles Curling Championship
