= Petra Klímová =

Czech curler

- Curler
- Born: Petra Vinšová; 15 November 1991 (age 34); Prague, Czechoslovakia

Team
- Curling club: CC Sokol Liboc, Prague
- Mixed doubles partner: Lukáš Klíma

Curling career
- Member Association: Czech Republic
- World Championship: 2 (2021, 2022)
- World Mixed Doubles Championship: 2 (2012, 2026)
- European Championship: 1 (2019)
- Other appearances: World Mixed Championship: 1 (2018), World Junior Championships: 2 (2012, 2013)
Medal record
Women's curling
Representing Czech Republic
Czech Women's Championship
Gold medal – first place	2020 Prague
Gold medal – first place	2022 Prague
Silver medal – second place	2015
Silver medal – second place	2018
World Junior Championships
Silver medal – second place	2012 Östersund

Petra Klímová (née Vinšová; born 15 November 1991 in Prague) is a Czech curler.

At the national level, she is a three-time Czech mixed champion (2015, 2018, 2019).

== Personal life ==
In March of 2026, she was awarded her PhD from Charles University after successfully defending her thesis on Ecological Processes Associated with the Glacial-Proglacial Ecosystem Transition.

At the 2023 she got married with fellow curler Lukáš Klíma and changed surname to "Klímová".

== Teams ==
=== Women's ===
Season	Skip	Third	Second	Lead	Alternate	Coach	Events
2011–12	Iveta Janatová (fourth)	Zuzana Hájková (skip)	Klára Svatoňová	Eva Malková	Petra Vinšová	Karel Kubeška	WJCC 2012 (silver)
2012–13	Iveta Janatová	Zuzana Hájková	Alžběta Baudyšová	Petra Vinšová			
2012–13	Iveta Janatová	Zuzana Hájková	Klára Svatoňová	Alžběta Baudyšová	Petra Vinšová	Karel Kubeška	WJCC 2013 (4th)
2012–13	Martina Strnadová	Iveta Janatová	Petra Vinšová	Eva Miklíková	Zuzana Hájková	Radek Boháč	CWCC 2013 (4th)
2013–14	Iveta Janatová (fourth)	Zuzana Hájková (skip)	Petra Vinšová	Eva Miklíková		Radek Boháč	CWCC 2014 (4th)
2014–15	Eva Miklíková	Iveta Janatová	Petra Vinšová	Martina Kajanová			CWCC 2015 (silver)
2015–16	Eva Miklíková	Iveta Janatová	Petra Vinšová	Martina Kajanová			CWCC 2016 (4th)
2017–18	Petra Vinšová (fourth)	Eva Miklíková (skip)	Michaela Baudyšová	Iveta Janatová	Martina Kajanová	Samuel Mokriš	CWCC 2018 (silver)
2018–19	Petra Vinšová (fourth)	Eva Miklíková (skip)	Michaela Baudyšová	Iveta Janatová	Martina Kajanová		CWCC 2019 (4th)
2019–20	Anna Kubešková	Alžběta Baudyšová	Petra Vinšová	Ežen Kolčevská	Michaela Baudyšová	Karel Kubeška	ECC 2019 (6th)
2020–21	Anna Kubešková	Alžběta Baudyšová	Michaela Baudyšová	Ežen Kolčevská	Petra Vinšová	Karel Kubeška	WWCC 2021 (12th)
2020–21	Anna Kubešková (fourth)	Ežen Kolčevská	Alžběta Baudyšová (skip)	Michaela Baudyšová	Klára Svatoňová, Petra Vinšová	Karel Kubeška	CWCC 2022 (gold)

=== Mixed ===
Season	Skip	Third	Second	Lead	Alternate	Coach	Events
2011–12	Lukáš Klíma	Martina Strnadová	Samuel Mokriš	Petra Vinšová			CMxCC 2012 (11th)
2012–13	Lukáš Klíma	Petra Vinšová	Kryštof Chaloupek	Alžběta Baudyšová			CMxCC 2013 (8th)
2014–15	Samuel Mokriš	Petra Vinšová	Štěpán Hron	Martina Kajanová	Lukáš Klíma		CMxCC 2015 (gold)
2015–16	Samuel Mokriš	Alžběta Baudyšová	Jan Zelingr	Martina Kajanová	Petra Vinšová		CMxCC 2016 (bronze)
2016–17	Lukáš Klíma	Petra Vinšová	Samuel Mokriš	Martina Kajanová	Martin Jurík		CMxCC 2017 (4th)
2017–18	Lukáš Klíma	Petra Vinšová	Marek Černovský	Michaela Baudyšová		Jakub Bareš	CMxCC 2018 (gold)
2018–19	Lukáš Klíma	Petra Vinšová	Marek Černovský	Michaela Baudyšová		Jakub Bareš (WMxCC)	WMxCC 2018 (9th); CMxCC 2019 (gold)

=== Mixed doubles ===
Season	Female	Male	Events
2010–11	Petra Vinšová	Jakub Kováč	CMDCC 2010 (12th)
2011–12	Petra Vinšová	Lukáš Klíma	CMDCC 2011 (silver); WMDCC 2012 (16th)
2012–13	Petra Vinšová	Lukáš Klíma	CMDCC 2012 (14th)
2013–14	Petra Vinšová	Lukáš Klíma	CMDCC 2013 (11th)
2015–16	Petra Vinšová	Lukáš Klíma	CMDCC 2015 (20th)
2016–17	Petra Vinšová	Lukáš Klíma	CMDCC 2016 (silver)
2018–19	Petra Vinšová	Lukáš Klíma	CMDCC 2019 (silver)
...
2023–24	Petra Klímová	Lukáš Klíma	CMDCC 2024 (bronze)
2025–26	Petra Klímová	Lukáš Klíma	CMDCC 2026 (gold); WMDCC 2026 (11th)
