= Miloš Hoferka =

Czech male curler

- Curler ♂
- Born: 19 May 1983 (age 43); Hradec Králové

Team
- Curling club: 1.CK Brno, Brno, 1.KCK Trutnov

Curling career
- Member Association: Czech Republic
- World Championship: 2 (2008, 2009)
- European Championship: 2 (2004, 2007)
- Other appearances: European Mixed Championship: 2 (2006, 2013), Winter Universiade: 1 (2007), World Junior B Championships: 2 (2003, 2004)
Medal record
Curling

Miloš Hoferka (born 19 May 1983) is a Czech male curler.

At the national level, he is a three-time Czech mixed bronze medallist (2000, 2009, 2014).

== Teams ==
=== Men's ===
Season	Skip	Third	Second	Lead	Alternate	Coach	Events
2002–03	Petr Šulc	Marek David	Vaclav Port	Jan Samueli	Miloš Hoferka		WJBCC 2003 (5th)
2003–04	Miloš Hoferka	Ludek Munzar	Jan Samueli	Ondrej Hurtik	Ivan Prouza	Vít Nekovařík	WJBCC 2004 (bronze)
2004–05	Karel Kubeška	Jan Létal	David Netušil	Jiří Lubina	Miloš Hoferka		ECC 2004 (14th)
2006–07	Radek Boháč	Petr Horák	Miloš Hoferka	Ondřej Mihola			
2006–07	Miloš Hoferka	Kryštof Chaloupek	Radek Cerman	Ondrej Nyvlt	Tomas Novak	Karel Kubeška	WUG 2007 (9th)
2007–08	Radek Boháč (fourth)	Miloš Hoferka (skip)	Petr Horák	Ondřej Mihola	Radek Cerman		CMCC 2008 (4th)
2007–08	Jiří Snítil	Martin Snítil	Jindřich Kitzberger	Marek Vydra	Miloš Hoferka	Sune Frederiksen	ECC 2007 (8th); WCC 2008 (12th)
2008–09	Miloš Hoferka	Iain Dykes	Ondřej Mihola	Radek Cerman			CMCC 2009 (6th)
2008–09	Jiří Snítil	Martin Snítil	Jindřich Kitzberger	Karel Uher	Miloš Hoferka	Sune Frederiksen	WCC 2009 (11th)
2009–10	Miloš Hoferka	Iain Dykes	Ondřej Mihola	Sune Frederiksen	Radek Cerman		CMCC 2010 (6th)
2013–14	Miloš Hoferka	Michal Zdenka	Vít Souček	Martin Štěpánek	Jakub Splavec		CMCC 2014 (5th)
2014–15	Michal Zdenka (fourth)	Miloš Hoferka (skip)	Vít Souček	Martin Štěpánek	Jakub Splavec	Martin Souček	CMCC 2015 (5th)
2015–16	Michal Zdenka (fourth)	Miloš Hoferka (skip)	Jakub Splavec	Martin Štěpánek		Martin Souček	CMCC 2016 (5th)
2016–17	Michal Zdenka	Miloš Hoferka	Vit Soucek	Martin Štěpánek			
2018–19	Kryštof Tabery	Miloš Hoferka	Ondrej Halek	Ondrej Hurtik		Vladimír Černovský	CMCC 2019 (4th)
2019–20	Miloš Hoferka	Tomáš Válek	Danila Liamaev	David Havlena	Vojtech Reitmayer		

=== Mixed ===
Season	Skip	Third	Second	Lead	Alternate	Coach	Events
1999–00	Jiří Lubina	Jana Zingová	Miloš Hoferka	Daniela Munzarová ml.			CMxCC 2000 (bronze)
2005–06	Miloš Hoferka	Jana Zingová	Vít Zinga	Daniela Munzarová st.	Jan Posledník		CMxCC 2006 (8th)
2006–07	Karel Kubeška	Miroslava Vařečková	Ludek Munzar	Renée Lepiskova	Miloš Hoferka, Anna Kubešková		EMxCC 2006 (8th)
2006–07	Miloš Hoferka	Jana Zingová	Vít Zinga	Daniela Munzarová st.			CMxCC 2007 (14th)
2008–09	Miloš Hoferka	Jana Jelínková	Ondřej Mihola	Pavlína Čížková			CMxCC 2009 (bronze)
2009–10	Iain Dykes	Jana Jelínková	Miloš Hoferka	Pavlína Čížková	Ondřej Mihola		CMxCC 2010 (10th)
2010–11	Miloš Hoferka	Jana Jelínková	Jiří Deyl	Pavlína Čížková	Ondřej Mihola		CMxCC 2011 (15th)
2011–12	Miloš Hoferka	Pavlína Čížková	Ondřej Mihola	Zuzana Hálová			CMxCC 2012 (5th)
2012–13	Miloš Hoferka	Pavlína Čížková	Ondřej Mihola	Jana Jelínková			CMxCC 2013 (9th)
2013–14	Miloš Hoferka	Lenka Kitzbergerová	Martin Štěpánek	Michaela Nádherová		Karolina Frederiksen	EMxCC 2013 (11th)
2013–14	Miloš Hoferka	Pavlína Čížková	Ondřej Mihola	Zuzana Hálová			CMxCC 2014 (bronze)

=== Mixed doubles ===
Season	Female	Male	Events
2007–08	?	Miloš Hoferka	CMDCC 2007 (???th)
2008–09	Jana Jelínková	Miloš Hoferka	CMDCC 2008 (bronze)

== Personal life ==
He started curling in 1999 at the age of 16.
