= 2011 Swiss Cup Basel =

- Host city: Arlesheim, Switzerland
- Arena: Curlingzentrum Region Basel
- Dates: September 30 – October 2
- Winner: (Canada) Brad Gushue
- Curling club: Bally Haly G&CC; St. John's, Newfoundland and Labrador
- Skip: Brad Gushue
- Third: Ryan Fry
- Second: Geoff Walker
- Lead: Adam Casey
- Finalist: (Switzerland) Peter de Cruz

The 2011 Swiss Cup Basel was held from September 30 to October 2 at the Curlingzentrum Region Basel in Arlesheim, Switzerland as part of the 2011–12 World Curling Tour. The purse for the event was CHF40,000, and the winner, Brad Gushue, received CHF13,000. It was held in a triple-knockout format. Gushue won in the final over Switzerland's Peter de Cruz with a score of 4–3.

== Teams ==
Skip	Third	Second	Lead	Locale
Beno Arnold	Ramon Hess	Timon Schlumpf	Sacha Martz	Switzerland
Tom Brewster	Greg Drummond	Scott Andrews	Michael Goodfellow	Aberdeen, Scotland
Benoit Schwarz (fourth)	Peter de Cruz (skip)	Gilles Vuille	Valentin Tanner	Switzerland
Andrey Drozdov	Alexey Stukalsky	Roman Kutuzov	Anton Kalalb	Russia
Niklas Edin	Sebastian Kraupp	Fredrik Lindberg	Viktor Kjäll	Karlstad, Sweden
Kristian Lindström (fourth)	Oskar Eriksson (skip)	Henrik Leek	Alexander Lindström	Lit, Sweden
Mario Freiberger	Bernhard Lips	Pascal Eicher	ALexander Schaier	Switzerland
Logan Gray	Alasdair Guthrie	Steve Mitchell	Sandy Gilmour	Stirling, Scotland
Brad Gushue	Ryan Fry	Geoff Walker	Adam Casey	St. John's, Newfoundland and Labrador
Marcus Hasselborg	Peder Folke	Andreas Prytz	Anton Sandström	Sweden
Toni Müller (fourth)	Jan Hauser (skip)	Marco Ramstein	Jurg Bamert	Zürich, Switzerland
Andy Lang	Daniel Herberg	Markus Messenzehl	Daniel Neuner	Germany
Pascal Hess	Yves Hess	Florian Meister	Stefan Meienberg	Switzerland
Aku Kauste	Jani Sullanmaa	Pauli Jäämies	Janne Pirko	Finland
Aleksandr Kirikov	Aleksandr Kozyrev	Artur Razhabov	Petr Dron	Russia
Thomas Løvold	Thomas Due	Steffen Walstad	Sander Rølvåg	Norway
Dominik Märki	Daniel Schifferli	Patrick Käser	Raphael Märki	Switzerland
Steffen Mellemseter	Markus Snøve Høiberg	Håvard Mellem	Magnus Nedregotten	Norway
Sven Michel	Claudio Pätz	Sandro Trolliet	Simon Gempeler	Adelboden, Switzerland
David Murdoch	Glen Muirhead	Ross Paterson	Richard Woods	Lockerbie, Scotland
Meico Öhninger	Andri Heimann	Kevin Wunderlin	Fabian Schmid	Switzerland
Claudio Pescia	Sven Iten	Reto Seiler	Rainer Kobler	St. Gallen, Switzerland
Tomi Rantamäki	Jussi Uusipaavalniemi	Pekka Peura	Jermu Pöllänen	Finland
Joël Retornaz	Silvio Zanotelli	Davide Zanotelli	Mirco Ferretti	Italy
Manuel Ruch	Jean-Nicolas Longchamp	Daniel Graf	Renato Hächler	Switzerland
Christof Schwaller	Alexander Attinger	Robert Hürlimann	Felix Attinger	Switzerland
David Sik	David Marek	Uher Karel	Milan Polivka	Czech Republic
Jiří Snítil	Martin Snítil	Jindrich Kitzberger	Marek Vydra	Prague, Czech Republic
Jeff Stoughton	Jon Mead	Reid Carruthers	Steve Gould	Winnipeg, Manitoba
Thomas Ulsrud	Torger Nergård	Christoffer Svae	Håvard Vad Petersson	Oslo, Norway
Rob Vilain	Miles McLure	Erik Dijkstra	Laurens van der Windt	Netherlands
Bernhard Werthemann	Bastian Brun	Daniel Widmer	Roger Stucki	Switzerland

== Knockout results ==
=== A event ===
First Knockout
(Switzerland) Jan Hauser	4
(Czech Republic) David Sik	2
(Scotland) David Murdoch	1
(Switzerland) Manuel Ruch	9
(Sweden) Oskar Eriksson	8
(Switzerland) Beno Arnold	2
(Canada) Jeff Stoughton	9
(Switzerland) Marco Öhninger	2
(Norway) Thomas Ulsrud	3
(Switzerland) Peter de Cruz	6
(Sweden) Marcus Hasselborg	5
(Switzerland) Dominik Märki	3
(Scotland) Logan Gray	6
(Switzerland) Bernhard Werthemann	4
(Switzerland) Christof Schwaller	2
(Czech Republic) Jiří Snítil	7

Quarterfinals
(Switzerland) Jan Hauser	3
(Switzerland) Manuel Ruch	5
(Sweden) Oskar Eriksson	3
(Canada) Jeff Stoughton	6
(Switzerland) Peter de Cruz	5
(Sweden) Marcus Hasselborg	6
(Scotland) Logan Gray	6
(Czech Republic) Jiří Snítil	3

Semifinals
(Switzerland) Manuel Ruch	5
(Canada) Jeff Stoughton	4
(Sweden) Marcus Hasselborg	3
(Scotland) Logan Gray	4

Qualifier 1
(Switzerland) Manuel Ruch	3
(Scotland) Logan Gray	4

First Knockout
(Canada) Brad Gushue	6
(Italy) Joël Retornaz	5
(Switzerland) Claudio Pescia	6
(Norway) Steffen Mellemseter	3
(Switzerland) Pascal Hess	5
(Finland) Aku Kauste	7
(Germany) Andy Lang	4
(Russia) Andrey Drozdov	6
(Scotland) Tom Brewster	3
(Finland) Tomi Rantamäki	4
(Norway) Thomas Løvold	5
(Netherlands) Rob Vilain	10
(Sweden) Niklas Edin	6
(Switzerland) Mario Freiberger	4
(Switzerland) Sven Michel	6
(Russia) Aleksandr Kirikov	2

Quarterfinals
(Canada) Brad Gushue	3
(Switzerland) Claudio Pescia	7
(Finland) Aku Kauste	6
(Russia) Andrey Drozdov	7
(Finland) Tomi Rantamäki	6
(Netherlands) Rob Vilain	1
(Sweden) Niklas Edin	6
(Switzerland) Sven Michel	3

Semifinals
(Switzerland) Claudio Pescia	7
(Russia) Andrey Drozdov	1
(Finland) Tomi Rantamäki	2
(Sweden) Niklas Edin	6

Qualifier 2
(Switzerland) Claudio Pescia	2
(Sweden) Niklas Edin	5

=== B event ===
Second Knockout
(Czech Republic) David Sik	4
(Scotland) David Murdoch	9
(Switzerland) Benno Arnold	4
(Switzerland) Marco Öhninger	3
(Norway) Thomas Ulsrud	4
(Switzerland) Dominik Märki	3
(Switzerland) Bernhard Werthemann	3
(Switzerland) Christof Schwaller	5

Quarterfinals
(Scotland) David Murdoch	4
(Switzerland) Beno Arnold	6
(Norway) Thomas Ulsrud	5
(Switzerland) Christof Schwaller	6

Semifinals
(Switzerland) Beno Arnold	6
(Russia) Andrey Drozdov	4
(Switzerland) Christof Schwaller	5
(Finland) Tomi Rantamäki	6

To Qualifier 3
(Switzerland) Beno Arnold	7
(Finland) Tomi Rantamäki	5
Qualifier 3
(Switzerland) Beno Arnold	2
(Switzerland) Sven Michel	5

Second Knockout		Semifinals		To Qualifier 3
				(Switzerland) Claudio Pescia	0
(Canada) Brad Gushue	6			(Switzerland) Sven Michel	6
(Finland) Aku Kauste	4	(Canada) Brad Gushue	3
(Netherlands) Rob Vilain	4	(Switzerland) Sven Michel	7
(Switzerland) Sven Michel	5

Second Knockout		Semifinals		To Qualifier 4
(Switzerland) Jan Hauser	3
(Sweden) Oskar Eriksson	7	(Sweden) Oskar Eriksson	5
(Switzerland) Peter de Cruz	7	(Czech Republic) Jiří Snítil	2
(Czech Republic) Jiří Snítil	9			(Sweden) Oskar Eriksson	7
				(Switzerland) Manuel Ruch	1

Second Knockout
(Italy) Joël Retornaz	2
(Norway) Steffen Mellemseter	5
(Switzerland) Pascal Hess	6
(Germany) Andy Lang	3
(Scotland) Tom Brewster	4
(Norway) Thomas Løvold	3
(Switzerland) Mario Freiberger	7
(Russia) Aleksandr Kirikov	4

Quarterfinals
(Norway) Steffen Mellemseter	1
(Switzerland) Pascal Hess	9
(Scotland) Tom Brewster	8
(Switzerland) Mario Freiberger	2

Semifinals
(Switzerland) Pascal Hess	2
(Canada) Jeff Stoughton	8
(Scotland) Tom Brewster	7
(Sweden) Marcus Hasselborg	1

To Qualifier 4
(Canada) Jeff Stoughton	4
(Scotland) Tom Brewster	5
Qualifier 4
(Sweden) Oskar Eriksson	0
(Scotland) Tom Brewster	6

=== C event ===
Third Knockout
(Czech Republic) David Sik	1
(Switzerland) Meico Öhninger	10
(Switzerland) Dominik Märki	7
(Switzerland) Bernhard Werthemann	3

Quarterfinals
(Finland) Aku Kauste	9
(Switzerland) Meico Öhninger	1
(Netherlands) Rob Vilain	3
(Switzerland) Dominik Märki	8

Semifinals
(Finland) Aku Kauste	5
(Switzerland) Dominik Märki	6

Qualifier 5
(Switzerland) Dominik Märki	7
(Switzerland) Beno Arnold	2

Third Knockout
(Scotland) David Murdoch	8
(Norway) Thomas Ulsrud	6

Quarterfinals
(Switzerland) Pascal Hess	4
(Sweden) Marcus Hasselborg	6
(Canada) Brad Gushue	8
(Scotland) David Murdoch	3

Semifinals
(Finland) Tomi Rantamäki	5
(Sweden) Marcus Hasselborg	6
(Switzerland) Manuel Ruch	3
(Canada) Brad Gushue	7

Qualifier 6
(Sweden) Marcus Hasselborg	5
(Canada) Brad Gushue	6

Third Knockout
(Norway) Steffen Mellemseter	6
(Switzerland) Mario Freiberger	3

Quarterfinals
(Czech Republic) Jiří Snítil	5
(Norway) Steffen Mellemseter	4
(Russia) Andrey Drozdov	3
(Switzerland) Christof Schwaller	7

Semifinals
(Switzerland) Claudio Pescia	6
(Czech Republic) Jiří Snítil	7
(Canada) Jeff Stoughton	7
(Switzerland) Christof Schwaller	3

Qualifier 7
(Czech Republic) Jiří Snítil	5
(Canada) Jeff Stoughton	6

Third Knockout
(Italy) Joël Retornaz	6
(Germany) Andy Lang	8
(Norway) Thomas Løvold	6
(Russia) Aleksandr Kirikov	3

Quarterfinals
(Switzerland) Jan Hauser	5
(Germany) Andy Lang	6
(Switzerland) Peter de Cruz	8
(Norway) Thomas Løvold	4

Semifinals
(Germany) Andy Lang	1
(Switzerland) Peter de Cruz	7

Qualifier 8
(Switzerland) Peter de Cruz	6
(Sweden) Oskar Eriksson	5

== Playoffs ==
Quarterfinals
(Scotland) Logan Gray	5
(Switzerland) Peter de Cruz	6
(Switzerland) Sven Michell	6
(Canada) Jeff Stoughton	7
(Scotland) Tom Brewster	5
(Switzerland) Dominik Märki	4
(Sweden) Niklas Edin	5
(Canada) Brad Gushue	6

Semifinals
(Switzerland) Peter de Cruz	7
(Canada) Jeff Stoughton	4
(Scotland) Tom Brewster	5
(Canada) Brad Gushue	6

Final
(Switzerland) Peter de Cruz	3
(Canada) Brad Gushue	4
