= Michaela Baudyšová =

Czech curler

- Curler
- Born: 16 January 1998 (age 28); Prague, Czech Republic

Team
- Curling club: CC Sokol Liboc, Prague
- Skip: Michaela Baudyšová
- Third: Karolína Špundová
- Second: Aneta Müllerová
- Lead: Matylda Volfová
- Alternate: Emma Seifriedová

Curling career
- Member Association: Czech Republic
- World Championship: 2 (2021, 2022)
- European Championship: 6 (2019, 2021, 2022, 2023, 2025, 2026)
- Other appearances: World Mixed Championship: 1 (2018), Winter Universiade: 1 (2019), World Junior-B Championships: 4 (2016, 2017, 2018, 2019 (Jan))
Medal record
Women's curling
Representing Czech Republic
European Championship B-Division
Gold medal – first place	2024 Östersund
Czech Women's Championship
Gold medal – first place	2020 Prague
Gold medal – first place	2022 Prague
Gold medal – first place	2023 Prague
Silver medal – second place	2018 Prague

Michaela Baudyšová (born 16 January 1998 in Prague) is a Czech curler. She currently plays fourth on the Czech national women's curling team, skipped by Alžběta Zelingrová.

At the national level, she is a two-time Czech women's champion (2020, 2022) curler and a two-time Czech mixed champion (2018, 2019).

== Personal life ==
As of 2021 she is a chemistry/chemical technologies student. Her sister, Alžběta Zelingrová, is also a curler.

== Teams ==
=== Women's ===
Season	Skip	Third	Second	Lead	Alternate	Coach	Events
2015–16	Alžběta Baudyšová	Eliška Srnská	Karolína Špundová	Andrea Krupanská	Michaela Baudyšová	Michal Vojtus	WJBCC 2016 (5th)
2016–17	Andrea Krupanská (fourth)	Denisa Postova	Karolína Špundová	Kristina Podrábská (skip)	Michaela Baudyšová	Brad Askew	WJBCC 2017 (5th)
2017–18	Andrea Krupanská (fourth)	Michaela Baudyšová	Karolína Špundová	Kristina Podrábská (skip)	Denisa Poštova	Jakub Bareš	WJBCC 2018 (10th)
2017–18	Petra Vinšová (fourth)	Eva Miklíková (skip)	Michaela Baudyšová	Iveta Janatová	Martina Kajanová	Samuel Mokriš	CWCC 2018 (silver)
2018–19	Laura Klímová	Michaela Baudyšová	Karolína Špundová	Luisa Klímová	Ema Kynčlová	Jakub Bareš	WJBCC 2019 (Jan) (9th)
2018–19	Alžběta Baudyšová	Michaela Baudyšová	Lenka Hronová	Ežen Kolčevská	Eliška Srnská	Jakub Bareš	WUG 2019 (9th)
2018–19	Petra Vinšová (fourth)	Eva Miklíková (skip)	Michaela Baudyšová	Iveta Janatová	Martina Kajanová		CWCC 2019 (4th)
2019–20	Anna Kubešková	Alžběta Baudyšová	Petra Vinšová	Ežen Kolčevská	Michaela Baudyšová	Karel Kubeška	ECC 2019 (6th)
2020–21	Anna Kubešková	Alžběta Baudyšová	Michaela Baudyšová	Ežen Kolčevská	Petra Vinšová	Karel Kubeška	WWCC 2021 (12th)
2021–22	Anna Kubešková	Alžběta Baudyšová	Michaela Baudyšová	Ežen Kolčevská	Klára Svatoňová	Karel Kubeška	ECC 2021 (9th)
2021–22	Anna Kubešková (fourth)	Ežen Kolčevská	Alžběta Baudyšová (skip)	Michaela Baudyšová	Klára Svatoňová, Petra Vinšová	Karel Kubeška	CWCC 2022 (gold)
2022–23	Alžběta Zelingrová	Aneta Müllerová	Michaela Baudyšová	Klára Svatoňová	Lenka Hronová	Karel Kubeška	ECC 2022 (12th)
2022–23	Alžběta Zelingrová	Michaela Baudyšová	Aneta Müllerová	Klára Svatoňová	Anna Kubešková	Karel Kubeška	CWCC 2023 (gold)
2023–24	Anna Kubešková	Aneta Müllerová	Klára Svatoňová	Karolína Špundová	Michaela Baudyšová	Karel Kubeška	
2023–24	Anna Kubešková	Michaela Baudyšová	Aneta Müllerová	Klára Svatoňová	Karolína Špundová	Karel Kubeška	ECC 2023 (9th)
2026–27	Michaela Baudyšová	Karolína Špundová	Aneta Müllerová	Matylda Volfová	Emma Seifriedová	Karel Kubeška	2026 World Qualifier

=== Mixed ===
Season	Skip	Third	Second	Lead	Coach	Events
2014–15	Jaroslav Vedral	Eliška Srnská	Jiří Provázek	Michaela Baudyšová		CMxCC 2015 (11th)
2016–17	Kryštof Krupanský	Alžběta Baudyšová	Jan Zelingr	Michaela Baudyšová		CMxCC 2017 (6th)
2017–18	Lukáš Klíma	Petra Vinšová	Marek Černovský	Michaela Baudyšová	Jakub Bareš	CMxCC 2018 (gold)
2018–19	Lukáš Klíma	Petra Vinšová	Marek Černovský	Michaela Baudyšová	Jakub Bareš (WMxCC)	WMxCC 2018 (9th); CMxCC 2019 (gold)

=== Mixed doubles ===
Season	Female	Male	Events
2018–19	Michaela Baudyšová	Kryštof Krupanský	CMDCC 2019 (5th)
