= Karel Uher =

Czech curler (born 1983)

- Curler ♂
- Born: 3 July 1983 (age 43); Prague

Team
- Curling club: CC Savona, Prague, 1.CK Brno, Brno, CC Dion, Prague

Curling career
- Member Association: Czech Republic
- World Championship: 1 (2009)
- European Championship: 3 (2008, 2009, 2010)
- Other appearances: World Junior Championships: 2 (1999, 2000), World Junior B Championships: 2 (2001, 2002)
Medal record
Curling
Czech Men's Championship
Gold medal – first place	2009
Gold medal – first place	2010
Gold medal – first place	2011
Silver medal – second place	2005
Silver medal – second place	2006
Silver medal – second place	2012
Bronze medal – third place	2013

Karel Uher (born 3 July 1983 in Prague) is a Czech male curler.

At the national level, he is a three-time Czech male champion curler (2009, 2010, 2011).

== Teams ==
=== Men's ===
Season	Skip	Third	Second	Lead	Alternate	Coach	Events
1998–99	Vit Nekovarik	Petr Sulc	Jindřich Kitzberger	Marek David	Karel Uher	Rodger Gustaf Schmidt	WJCC 1999 (7th)
1999–00	Vit Nekovarik	Petr Sulc	Jindřich Kitzberger	Marek David	Karel Uher	Rodger Gustaf Schmidt, Jiří Snítil	WJCC 2000 (10th)
2000–01	Petr Sulc	Jindřich Kitzberger	Karel Uher	Marek David	Petr Stastny	Björn Schröder	WJBCC 2001 (5th)
2001–02	Petr Sulc	Jindřich Kitzberger	Karel Uher	Marek David	Jan Samueli		WJBCC 2002 (bronze)
2004–05	Vít Nekovařík	Marek David	Aleš Prchlík	Karel Uher	Petr Štěpánek		CMCC 2005 (silver)
2005–06	Vít Nekovařík	Marek David	Aleš Prchlík	Karel Uher	Petr Štěpánek		CMCC 2006 (silver)
2006–07	Vít Nekovařík	Marek David	Aleš Prchlík	Karel Uher	Petr Šulc		CMCC 2007 (5th)
2007–08	Vít Nekovařík	Marek David	David Havlena	Aleš Prchlík	Karel Uher		CMCC 2008 (5th)
2008–09	Jiří Snítil	Jindřich Kitzberger	Martin Snítil	Marek Vydra	Karel Uher	Sune Frederiksen	ECC 2008 (7th); CMCC 2009 (gold)
2008–09	Jiří Snítil	Martin Snítil	Jindřich Kitzberger	Karel Uher	Miloš Hoferka	Sune Frederiksen	WCC 2009 (11th)
2009–10	Jiří Snítil	Martin Snítil	Jindřich Kitzberger	Marek Vydra	Karel Uher	Ellery Robichaud	ECC 2009 (8th); CMCC 2010 (gold)
2010–11	Jiří Snítil	Martin Snítil	Karel Uher	Marek Vydra	Jakub Bareš	Ellery Robichaud	ECC 2010 (7th)
2010–11	Jiří Snítil	Martin Snítil	Jindřich Kitzberger	Marek Vydra	Karel Uher		CMCC 2011 (gold)
2011–12	David Šik	Marek David	Karel Uher	Milan Polívka			
2011–12	David Šik	Radek Boháč	Karel Uher	Milan Polívka	Marek David	Sune Frederiksen	CMCC 2012 (silver)
2012–13	David Šik	Radek Boháč	Karel Uher	Milan Polívka	Sune Frederiksen		CMCC 2013 (bronze)

=== Mixed ===
Season	Skip	Third	Second	Lead	Alternate	Events
2008–09	Vít Nekovařík	Lenka Černovská	Karel Uher	Kateřina Urbanová		CMxCC 2009 (silver)
2010–11	David Šik	Eva Štampachová	Karel Uher	Michala Souhradová		CMxCC 2011 (silver)
2011–12	David Šik	Michala Souhradová	Marek David	Klára Boušková	Karel Uher, Eva Štampachová	CMxCC 2012 (silver)

== Personal life ==
He started curling in 1993 at the age of 10.
