= Julie Zelingrová =

Czech curler (born 2006)

- Curler
- Born: 28 March 2006 (age 20); Prague, Czech Republic

Team
- Curling club: CC Dion, Prague
- Mixed doubles partner: Vít Chabičovský

Curling career
- Member Association: Czech Republic
- World Mixed Doubles Championship: 4 (2022, 2023, 2025, 2027)
- Olympic: 1 (2026)
Medal record
Curling
Czech Mixed Doubles Championship
Gold medal – first place	2022 Prague

Julie Zelingrová (born 28 March 2006) is a Czech curler.

At the national level, she is a one-time Czech mixed doubles champion curler (2022) and two-time Czech junior champion curler (2020, 2022).

== Teams ==
=== Women's ===
Season	Skip	Third	Second	Lead	Alternate	Coach	Events
2017–18	Julie Zelingrová	Veronika Vašáková	Eliška Hercoková	Kristýna Farková	Klára Koscelanská	Petr Horák	CJCC 2018 (silver)
2019–20	Julie Zelingrová	Kristýna Farková	Klára Koscelanská	Klára Baudyšová	Eliška Hercoková	Petr Horák	CJCC 2020 (gold)
2021–22	Klára Baudyšová	Kristýna Farková	Julie Zelingrová	Karolína Němcová	Klára Koscelanská	Petr Horák	CJCC 2022 (gold)
2024-25	Julie Zelingrová (Fourth)	Kristýna Farková (Skip)	Ema Košáková	Stella Svitáková	Sofie Krupičková	Petr Horák	2024 World Junior-B Curling Championships (TBD)

=== Mixed ===
Season	Skip	Third	Second	Lead	Alternate	Coach	Events
2018–19	David Jakl	Julie Zelingrová	Daniel Peter	Kristýna Farková			CMxCC 2019 (16th)
2021–22	Eliška Siblíková	Julie Zelingrová	Lukáš Merta	Sebastian Ženatý	Tomáš Kadlec	Tomáš Kadlec	CMxCC 2022 (10th)

=== Mixed doubles ===
Season	Female	Male	Coach	Events
2021–22	Julie Zelingrová	Vít Chabičovský	Petr Horák	CMDCC 2022 (gold)
2021–22	Julie Zelingrová	Vít Chabičovský	Brad Askew	WMDCC 2022 (13th)
2022–23	Julie Zelingrová	Vít Chabičovský	Jakub Bareš	CMDCC 2023 (gold); WMDCC 2023 (15th)
2023–24	Julie Zelingrová	Vít Chabičovský	Vladimír Černovský	CMDCC 2024 (silver)
2024–25	Julie Zelingrová	Vít Chabičovský	Vladimír Černovský	CJMDCC 2025 (silver); WMDCC 2025 (16th)
2025–26	Julie Zelingrová	Vít Chabičovský	Vladimír Černovský	WOG 2026 (8th)
2026–27	Julie Zelingrová	Vít Chabičovský	Vladimír Černovský	WMDCC 2027 ()
