= Vít Chabičovský =

Czech curler (born 2004)

- Curler
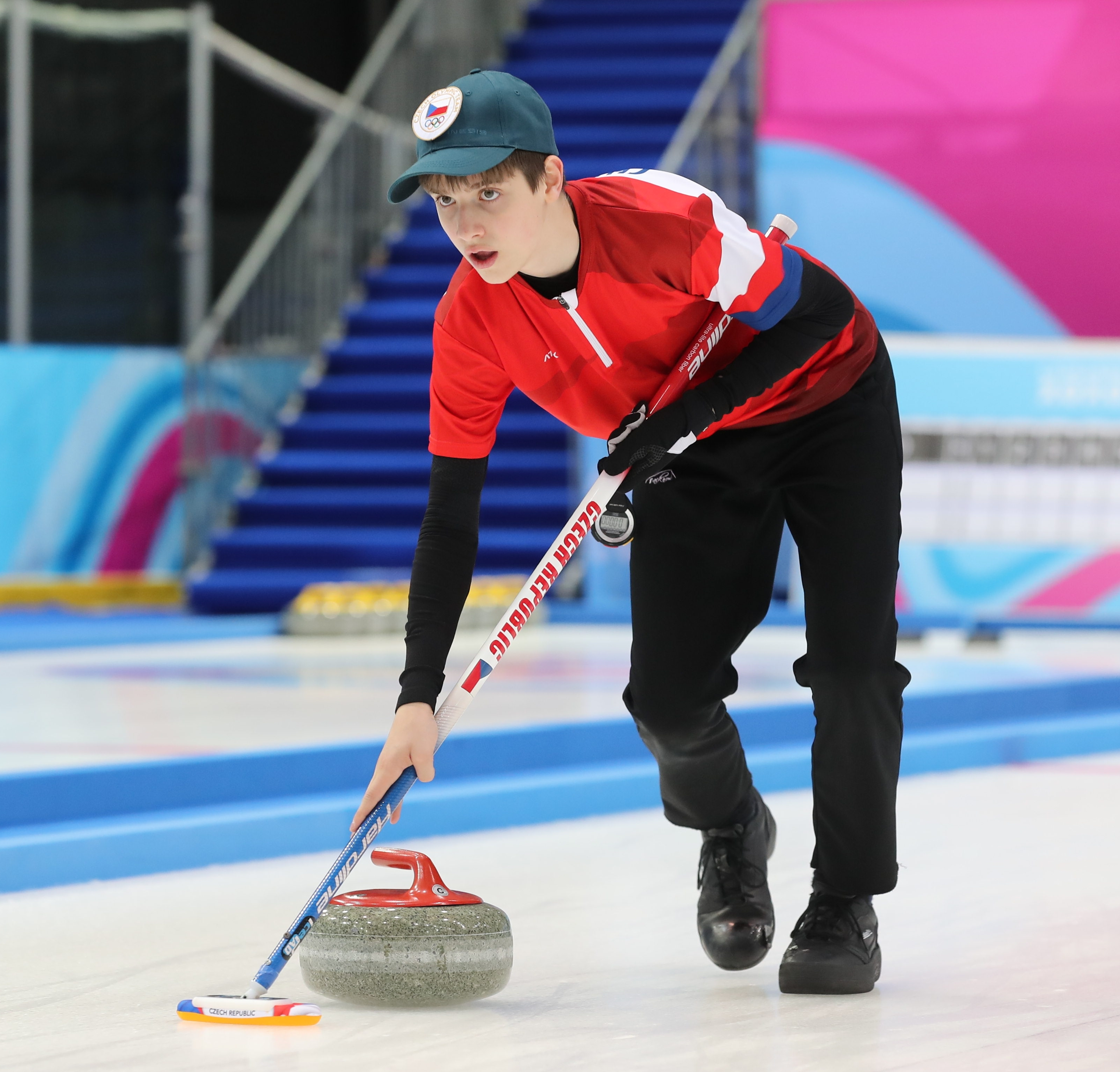
- Born: 19 May 2004 (age 22); Prague, Czech Republic

Team
- Curling club: CC Dion, Prague
- Skip: Lukáš Klíma
- Third: Vít Chabičovský
- Second: Martin Jurík
- Lead: Lukáš Klípa
- Mixed doubles partner: Julie Zelingrová

Curling career
- Member Association: Czech Republic
- World Championship: 1 (2026)
- World Mixed Doubles Championship: 4 (2022, 2023, 2025, 2027)
- European Championship: 1 (2026)
- Olympic: 1 (2026)
- Other appearances: Winter Youth Olympics: 1 (2020 - mixed, mixed doubles)
Medal record
Curling
Winter Youth Olympics
Bronze medal – third place	2020 Champéry
Czech Men's Championship
Silver medal – second place	2024
Czech Mixed Doubles Championship
Gold medal – first place	2022 Prague

Vít Chabičovský (born 19 May 2004) is a Czech curler. He currently plays third on Team Lukáš Klíma.

At the international level, he is a 2020 Winter Youth Olympics mixed doubles bronze medallist. He also represented the Czech Republic at the 2026 Winter Olympics, finishing 8th.

At the national level, he is a three-time Czech mixed doubles champion curler (2022, 2023, 2025).

== Teams ==
=== Men's ===
Season	Skip	Third	Second	Lead	Alternate	Coach	Events
2016–17	Marek Bříza	Vít Chabičovský	Jakub Zahořík	Tobiáš Votava		Petr Horák	CJCC 2017 (9th)
2017–18	Marek Bříza	Vít Chabičovský	Tobiáš Votava	Jakub Zahořík		Petr Horák	CJCC 2018 (6th)
2018–19	Vít Chabičovský (fourth)	Marek Bříza (skip)	David Škácha		Tobiáš Votava	Petr Horák	CJCC 2019 (bronze)
2019–20	Vít Chabičovský	Marek Bříza	Matyáš Votava	Tobiáš Votava		Petr Štěpánek	CJCC 2020 (gold)
2021–22	Vít Chabičovský	Marek Bříza	David Jakl	Aleš Hercok	Daniel Peter	Petr Štěpánek	CJCC 2022 (silver)
2024–25	Vít Chabičovský	David Jakl	Jakub Hanák	Aleš Hercok	Marek Bříza		
2025–26	Lukáš Klíma	Marek Černovský	Martin Jurík	Lukáš Klípa	Vít Chabičovský		WMCC 2026
2026–27	Lukáš Klíma	Vít Chabičovský	Martin Jurík	Lukáš Klípa			

=== Mixed ===
Season	Skip	Third	Second	Lead	Coach	Events
2019–20	Vít Chabičovský	Zuzana Pražáková	František Jiral	Kristyna Farková	Petr Horák	WYOG 2020 (14th)

=== Mixed doubles ===
Season	Female	Male	Coach	Events
2019–20	(China) Pei Junhang	(Czech Republic) Vít Chabičovský	Perry Marshall	WYOG 2020 (bronze)
2021–22	Julie Zelingrová	Vít Chabičovský	Petr Horák	CMDCC 2022 (gold)
2021–22	Julie Zelingrová	Vít Chabičovský	Brad Askew	WMDCC 2022 (13th)
2022–23	Julie Zelingrová	Vít Chabičovský	Jakub Bareš	CMDCC 2023 (gold); WMDCC 2023 (15th)
2023–24	Julie Zelingrová	Vít Chabičovský	Vladimír Černovský	CMDCC 2024 (silver)
2024–25	Julie Zelingrová	Vít Chabičovský	Vladimír Černovský	CJMDCC 2025 (silver); WMDCC 2025 (16th)
2025–26	Julie Zelingrová	Vít Chabičovský	Vladimír Černovský	WOG 2026 (8th)
