= Czech Junior Mixed Doubles Curling Championship =

Curling championships in the Czech Republic

The Czech Junior Mixed Doubles Curling Championship (Czech: MČR mixed doubles juniorů) is the national championship of mixed doubles curling (one man and one woman) in the Czech Republic. Junior level curlers must be under the age of 21. It has been held annually since the 2024–2025 season and organised by the Czech Curling Association.

== List of champions and medallists ==
Team line-ups shows in order: woman, man, coach (if exists).

Year, host city, dates	Champion	Runner-up	Bronze
2025; Prague; Nov. 15-18, 2024	Brnoso; Sofie Krupičková / Ondřej Blaha coach: Marek Černovský	DION WC; Julie Zelingrová / Vít Chabičovský coach: Vladimír Černovský	Kameňáci; Ema Košáková / Tobiáš Votava coach: Martin Votava

== Medal record for curlers ==
Curler	Gold	Silver	Bronze
Sofie Krupičková	1		
Ondřej Blaha	1		
Julie Zelingrová		1	
Vít Chabičovský		1	
Ema Košáková			1
Tobiáš Votava			1

== See also ==
- Czech Men's Curling Championship
- Czech Women's Curling Championship
- Czech Mixed Curling Championship
- Czech Mixed Doubles Curling Championship
- Czech Junior Curling Championships
