= Alžběta Zelingrová =

Czech curler

- Curler
- Born: 27 January 1995 (age 31); Prague, Czech Republic

Team
- Curling club: CC Dion, Prague, CC Sokol Liboc, Prague

Curling career
- Member Association: Czech Republic
- World Championship: 5 (2014, 2017, 2018, 2021, 2022)
- European Championship: 8 (2015, 2016, 2017, 2018, 2019, 2021, 2022, 2026)
- Other appearances: Youth Olympic Games: 1 (2012 - mixed, mixed doubles), Winter Universiade 1: (2019), World Junior Championships: 3 (2013, 2014, 2015)
Medal record
Women's curling
Representing Czech Republic
European Championship B-Division
Gold medal – first place	2024 Östersund
Czech Women's Championship
Gold medal – first place	2015 Prague
Gold medal – first place	2016 Prague
Gold medal – first place	2017 Prague
Gold medal – first place	2018 Prague
Gold medal – first place	2019 Prague
Gold medal – first place	2020 Prague
Gold medal – first place	2022 Prague
Gold medal – first place	2023 Prague
Silver medal – second place	2014 Prague

Alžběta Anna Zelingrová (born 27 January 1995 in Prague as Alžběta Baudyšová) is a Czech curler.

== Career ==
Zelingrová joined the Czech national women's curling team as the alternate in 2013. Her first international event was when the team played in the 2014 World Women's Curling Championship where the Czech Republic went 3–8. In 2016 they played in the 2016 Europeans and finished in fourth place, which also qualified them for the 2017 World Women's Curling Championship. There, they finished with a 5–6 record. At the 2017 Euros, they finished with a 3–6 record, qualifying once again for the World Championship. At the 2018 World Women's Curling Championship, the Czech team qualified for the playoffs for the first time with a 6–6 record. They then lost the qualification game 7–3 to Russia's Victoria Moiseeva. The 2018 Europeans were not successful for the Czechs as they did not qualify for the World Championship. The following season, they would qualify for the Worlds, after going 3–6 at the 2019 European Curling Championships. The 2020 World Women's Curling Championship was cancelled due to the COVID-19 pandemic, but the team represented Czech Republic at the 2021 World Women's Curling Championship which was played in a bio-secure "bubble" to prevent spread of the virus. There, they finished in twelfth place with a 3–10 record.

== Personal life ==
She is currently employed as a teacher. Previously, she was a student at Charles University in Prague. Her sister, Michaela Baudyšová, is also a curler. She married Jan Zelingr in August 2022, they have two children.

== Teams ==
=== Women's ===
Season	Skip	Third	Second	Lead	Alternate	Coach	Events
2012–13	Iveta Janatová	Zuzana Hájková	Alžběta Baudyšová	Petra Vinšová			
2012–13	Iveta Janatová	Zuzana Hájková	Klára Svatoňová	Alžběta Baudyšová	Petra Vinšová	Karel Kubeška	WJCC 2013 (4th)
2013–14	Iveta Janatová	Zuzana Hájková	Alžběta Baudyšová	Klára Svatoňová	Eliška Srnská	Karel Kubeška	WJCC 2014 (7th)
2013–14	Anna Kubešková	Tereza Plíšková	Klára Svatoňová	Veronika Herdová	Alžběta Baudyšová	Karel Kubeška	WWCC 2014 (9th)
2014–15	Anna Kubešková	Tereza Plíšková	Klára Svatoňová	Veronika Herdová	Alžběta Baudyšová		
2014–15	Alžběta Baudyšová	Helena Hájková	Eliška Srnská	Lenka Hronová	Andrea Krupanská	Sune Frederiksen	WJCC 2015 (10th)
2015–16	Anna Kubešková	Alžběta Baudyšová	Tereza Plíšková	Klára Svatoňová	Ežen Kolčevská	Karel Kubeška	ECC 2015 (12th)
2015–16	Anna Kubešková	Tereza Plíšková	Klára Svatoňová	Alžběta Baudyšová			
2016–17	Anna Kubešková	Alžběta Baudyšová	Tereza Plíšková	Klára Svatoňová	Ežen Kolčevská	Karel Kubeška	ECC 2016 (4th); WWCC 2017 (7th)
2017–18	Anna Kubešková	Alžběta Baudyšová	Tereza Plíšková	Klára Svatoňová	Ežen Kolčevská	Karel Kubeška	ECC 2017 (7th); WWCC 2018 (6th)
2018–19	Anna Kubešková	Alžběta Baudyšová	Tereza Plíšková	Ežen Kolčevská	Eliška Soukupová	Karel Kubeška	ECC 2018 (8th); CWCC 2019 (gold)
2018–19	Alžběta Baudyšová	Michaela Baudyšová	Lenka Hronová	Ežen Kolčevská	Eliška Srnská	Jakub Bareš	WUG 2019 (9th)
2019–20	Anna Kubešková	Alžběta Baudyšová	Petra Vinšová	Ežen Kolčevská	Michaela Baudyšová	Karel Kubeška	ECC 2019 (6th)
2020–21	Anna Kubešková	Alžběta Baudyšová	Michaela Baudyšová	Ežen Kolčevská	Petra Vinšová	Karel Kubeška	WWCC 2021 (12th)
2021–22	Anna Kubešková	Alžběta Baudyšová	Michaela Baudyšová	Ežen Kolčevská	Klára Svatoňová	Karel Kubeška	ECC 2021 (9th)
2021–22	Anna Kubešková (fourth)	Ežen Kolčevská	Alžběta Baudyšová (skip)	Michaela Baudyšová	Klára Svatoňová, Petra Vinšová	Karel Kubeška	CWCC 2022 (gold)
2022–23	Alžběta Zelingrová	Aneta Müllerová	Michaela Baudyšová	Klára Svatoňová	Lenka Hronová	Karel Kubeška	ECC 2022 (12th)
2022–23	Alžběta Zelingrová	Michaela Baudyšová	Aneta Müllerová	Klára Svatoňová	Anna Kubešková	Karel Kubeška	CWCC 2023 (gold)

=== Mixed ===
Season	Skip	Third	Second	Lead	Coach	Events
2011–12	Marek Černovský	Alžběta Baudyšová	Kryštof Krupanský	Zuzana Hrůzová	Vlastimil Vojtus	WYOG 2012 (6th)

=== Mixed doubles ===
Season	Female	Male	Coach	Events
2011–12	Alžběta Baudyšová	Bai Yang	Vlastimil Vojtus	WYOG 2012 (17th)
2018–19	Alžběta Baudyšová	Jan Zelingr		CMDCC 2019 (6th)
