= Marek Vydra =

Czech male curler

- Curler ♂
- Born: 14 March 1975 (age 51); Prague, Czech Republic

Team
- Curling club: 1.CK Brno, Brno

Curling career
- Member Association: Czech Republic
- World Championship: 5 (2008, 2011, 2012, 2013, 2014)
- European Championship: 9 (2003, 2006, 2007, 2008, 2009, 2010, 2011, 2012, 2013)
Medal record
Curling
European Championships
Bronze medal – third place	2012 Karlstad
Czech Men's Championship
Gold medal – first place	2003
Gold medal – first place	2006
Gold medal – first place	2007
Gold medal – first place	2008
Gold medal – first place	2009
Gold medal – first place	2010
Gold medal – first place	2011
Gold medal – first place	2012
Gold medal – first place	2013
Gold medal – first place	2014

Marek Vydra (born 14 March 1975 in Prague) is a Czech male curler.

At the international level, he is a 2012 European bronze medallist.

At the national level, he is a ten-time Czech male champion curler.

== Teams ==
Season	Skip	Third	Second	Lead	Alternate	Coach	Events
2003–04	Jiří Snítil	Jindřich Kitzberger	Martin Snítil	Marek Vydra	David Havlena		ECC 2003 (15th)
2006–07	Jiří Snítil	Jindřich Kitzberger	Martin Snítil	Marek Vydra	Marek David		ECC 2006 (11th)
2007–08	Jiří Snítil	Martin Snítil	Jindřich Kitzberger	Marek Vydra	Miloš Hoferka	Sune Frederiksen	ECC 2007 (8th); WCC 2008 (12th)
2008–09	Jiří Snítil	Jindřich Kitzberger	Martin Snítil	Marek Vydra	Karel Uher	Sune Frederiksen	ECC 2008 (7th)
2009–10	Jiří Snítil	Martin Snítil	Jindřich Kitzberger	Marek Vydra	Karel Uher	Ellery Robichaud	ECC 2009 (8th)
2010–11	Jiří Snítil	Martin Snítil	Karel Uher (ECC); Jindřich Kitzberger (WCC)	Marek Vydra	Jakub Bareš	Ellery Robichaud	ECC 2010 (7th); WCC 2011 (8th)
2011–12	Jiří Snítil	Martin Snítil	Jindřich Kitzberger	Marek Vydra	Samuel Mokriš	Ellery Robichaud	ECC 2011 (4th); WCC 2012 (12th)
2012–13	Jiří Snítil	Martin Snítil	Jakub Bareš	Jindřich Kitzberger	Marek Vydra	Ellery Robichaud, Daniel Rafael	ECC 2012 (bronze)
2012–13	Jiří Snítil	Martin Snítil	Jindřich Kitzberger	Marek Vydra	Jakub Bareš	Daniel Rafael	WCC 2013 (8th)
2013–14	Jiří Snítil	Martin Snítil	Jindřich Kitzberger	Marek Vydra	Jakub Bareš	Sune Frederiksen	ECC 2013 (7th)
2013–14	Jiří Snítil	Martin Snítil	Jindřich Kitzberger	Jakub Bareš	Marek Vydra	Daniel Rafael	WCC 2014 (7th)

== Personal life ==
He started curling in 1997 at the age of 22.
