= Martin Jurík =

Czech curler (born 1991)

- Curler
- Born: 27 February 1991 (age 35); České Budějovice, Czechoslovakia

Team
- Skip: Lukáš Klíma
- Third: Vít Chabičovský
- Second: Martin Jurík
- Lead: Lukáš Klípa

Curling career
- Member Association: Czech Republic
- World Championship: 4 (2023, 2024, 2025, 2026)
- European Championship: 6 (2016, 2022, 2023, 2024, 2025, 2026)
- Olympic: 1 (2026)
Medal record
Men's curling
Czech Men's Curling Championship
Gold medal – first place	2016
Gold medal – first place	2023
Gold medal – first place	2024
Bronze medal – third place	2020

Martin Jurík (born 27 February 1991) is a Czech curler. He currently plays second on Team Lukáš Klíma.

== Career ==
=== Juniors ===
While attending the University of Economics in Prague, Jurík participated in three Winter Universiade representing the Czech Republic. At the 2013 Winter Universiade, he was the alternate on the team, which was skipped by Lukáš Klíma. The team finished in seventh place at the event, with a 3–6 record. Jurík played in just one game. Jurík played second on the Czech team at the next Winter Universiade played in 2015. The team, which was skipped by Kryštof Chaloupek, finished with a 3–6 record again, in sixth place. Jurík was the second again at the 2017 Winter Universiade, with Klíma skipping the team again. This time, the team made the playoffs after going 6–3 in the round robin. In the playoffs, the team lost both the semifinal to Great Britain as well as the bronze medal game to Norway, settling for fourth place.

=== Men's ===
After winning the Czech Men's Curling Championship in 2016, Jurík's men's team represented the country at the 2016 European Curling Championships. The team, which was skipped by Karel Kubeška played in the "B" group, and finished pool play with a 6–1 record. The team then lost in the semifinals against Slovakia, but rebounded to win the bronze medal against Israel to finish 3rd in the B Division, and 13th overall.

Jurík was the alternate on the Czech team, skipped by Klíma, at the 2022 European Curling Championships. The team finished the event with a 3–6 record, good enough to qualify the country for the 2023 World Men's Curling Championship. Jurík played in two games at the 2022 Europeans. The team then went on to win the 2023 Czech Men's Curling Championship, qualifying the team to represent the Czech Republic at the 2023 World Championships. There, Jurík was promoted to the lead position. The team finished with a 3–9 record, 10th overall. The team played in the 2023 European Curling Championships with Jurík throwing second stones. There, the team finished with a 2–7 record, good enough to qualify for the 2024 World Men's Curling Championship. Later in the season, the team won the Czech national championship. At the 2024 Worlds, the rink went 4–8.

Jurík and the Czech team would continue to improve during the 2024-25 curling season, and coached by former world champion Craig Savill, the team would again qualify for the 2025 World Men's Curling Championship. At the 2025 World's the team went 6–6 in the round robin, including wins over the current #1 ranked ranked team in the world, Scotland's Bruce Mouat, and the current European Champions, Germany's Marc Muskatewitz. This result would also tie the all-time highest placement for a Czech team at the worlds, finishing in 7th place. This strong showing earned the Czech Republic a direct berth to the 2026 Winter Olympics. At the Olympics, they would finish the round robin with a 3–6 record, finishing in 8th.

== Personal life ==
Jurík was born on 27 February 1991 in České Budějovice. He works as an IT salesman and lawn care business owner, and is married. He lives in Prague.
