= Lukáš Klípa =

Czech curler (born 1997)

- Curler
- Born: 11 March 1997 (age 29); Prague, Czech Republic

Team
- Curling club: CC Zbraslav
- Skip: Lukáš Klíma
- Third: Vít Chabičovský
- Second: Martin Jurík
- Lead: Lukáš Klípa

Curling career
- Member Association: Czech Republic
- World Championship: 5 (2022, 2023, 2024, 2025, 2026)
- European Championship: 6 (2018, 2022, 2023, 2024, 2025, 2026)
- Olympic: 1 (2026)
Medal record
Men's curling
World Mixed Championship
Bronze medal – third place	2017 Champéry
Czech Men's Curling Championship
Gold medal – first place	2023
Gold medal – first place	2024
Bronze medal – third place	2019

Lukáš Klípa (born 11 March 1997) is a Czech curler. He currently plays lead on Team Lukáš Klíma.

== Career ==
=== Juniors ===
Klípa's first international competition came at the 2015 European Junior Challenge Competition as the alternate for the Czech team, which was skipped by Krystof Krupansky. The team finished in fifth, and Klípa would not play in any games. The European Junior Curling Challenge, which was a qualifier for the World Junior Curling Championships was replaced by the World Junior-B Curling Championships the following year. Klípa would represent his home country for the next three years as a member of the national junior team at the World Junior B Championships. He was the alternate on the Czech team (skipped by Marek Černovský) at the 2016 World Junior B Curling Championships, finishing fifth. There, Klípa played in three games. The following year, Klípa played second on the team which was now skipped by Pavel Mares at the 2017 World Junior B Curling Championships. The team finished in 9th place. Klípa skipped the team at the 2018 World Junior B Curling Championships, while continuing to throw second rocks. There, he led his team of Mares, Martin Blahovec and David Verner to a 3–4 record in group play.

=== Mixed ===
Klípa was a member of the Czech mixed team, skipped by Jaroslav Vedral, at the 2017 World Mixed Curling Championship. Vedral led the team to a 5–2 record in group play. The team then beat China, and Estonia in the playoffs, before losing to Scotland in the semifinals. The team rebounded in the bronze medal game, beating Norway.

=== Men's ===
Klípa would act as the Czech team's alternate at the 2018 European Curling Championships, his first. The team, which was skipped by David Šik ended up winning the bronze medal in the B Tournament. Klípa did not play in any games.

Klípa was a member of the Czech team at the 2019 Winter Universiade. Klípa played lead om the team, which was skipped by Vedral. The team finished the round robin portion with a 5–4 record, and lost in their quarterfinal match to Switzerland, which was skipped by Yannick Schwaller.

Klípa joined the Czech national champion Lukáš Klíma rink as their alternate at the 2022 World Men's Curling Championship. There, the team finished with a 5–7 record. Despite being the alternate, Klípa played in seven games. The team played at the 2022 European Curling Championships with Klípa throwing lead rocks. The team finished the event with a 3–6 record, good enough to qualify the country for the 2023 World Men's Curling Championship. The team then went on to win the 2023 Czech Men's Curling Championship, qualifying the team to represent the Czech Republic at the 2023 World Men's Curling Championship. The team finished with a 3–9 record, 10th overall. At the Worlds, Klípa was the team's alternate, and played in three games.

The team played in the 2023 European Curling Championships with Klípa back at lead position. There, the team finished with a 2–7 record, good enough to qualify for the 2024 World Men's Curling Championship. Later in the season, the team won the Czech national championship. At the 2024 Worlds, the rink went 4–8.

Klípa and the Czech team would continue to improve during the 2024-25 curling season, and coached by former world champion Craig Savill, the team would again qualify for the 2025 World Men's Curling Championship. At the 2025 World's the team went 6–6 in the round robin, including wins over the current #1 ranked ranked team in the world, Scotland's Bruce Mouat, and the current European Champions, Germany's Marc Muskatewitz. This result would also tie the all-time highest placement for a Czech team at the worlds, finishing in 7th place. This strong showing earned the Czech Republic a direct berth to the 2026 Winter Olympics. At the Olympics, they would finish the round robin with a 3–6 record, finishing in 8th.

== Personal life ==
Klípa lives in Dobříš. He works as a bank employee.
