= Klára Pařízková =

Czech curler from Prague (born 1993)

- Curler
- Born: 24 January 1993 (age 33); Prague, Czech Republic

Team
- Curling club: CC Sokol Liboc, Prague, CZE
- Skip: Anna Kubešková
- Third: Michaela Baudyšová
- Second: Aneta Müllerová
- Lead: Klára Pařízková
- Alternate: Karolína Špundová

Curling career
- Member Association: Czech Republic
- World Championship: 4 (2014, 2017, 2018, 2022)
- European Championship: 7 (2013, 2015, 2016, 2017, 2021, 2022, 2023)
Medal record
Women's curling
Representing Czech Republic
World Junior Championships
Silver medal – second place	2012 Östersund
Czech Women's Championship
Gold medal – first place	2013 Prague
Gold medal – first place	2015 Prague
Gold medal – first place	2016 Prague
Gold medal – first place	2017 Prague
Gold medal – first place	2018 Prague
Gold medal – first place	2019 Prague
Gold medal – first place	2020 Prague
Gold medal – first place	2022 Prague
Gold medal – first place	2023 Prague
Silver medal – second place	2014 Prague

Klára Pařízková (born 24 January 1993 as Klára Svatoňová) is a Czech curler from Prague. She currently plays lead on the Czech national women's curling team, skipped by Anna Kubešková.

== Career ==
In her first World Junior Curling Championships in 2012, Pařízková was part of the first ever Czech Republic curling team to win a World Championship medal. Her team won the silver medal, Pařízková playing second for Zuzana Hájková. The team had a strong performance, finishing the round robin with a 6–3 record, in a five-way tie for second. The team avoided a tie breaker however, and after losing their first playoff game to first place Scotland, they rallied to win the semi-final against Sweden's Sara McManus before losing once again to Scotland's Hannah Fleming in the final.

The team returned to the 2013 World Junior Curling Championships, with fourth-thrower Iveta Janatova now skipping the team. The team finished the round robin with a 5–4 record, in a four-way tie for third place. The team won their tie-breaker match against Denmark's Stephanie Risdal Nielsen before losing to Russia's Yulia Portunova in the playoffs. The team then had to play in the bronze medal game against Japan's Sayaka Yoshimura, which they lost, forcing the team to settle for 4th place.

The next season, Pařízková joined the Czech women's team, skipped by Anna Kubešková as lead. The team played in the 2013 European Curling Championships, where they finished the event with a 4–5 record in 6th place. The next month, the team played in the Olympic qualifying tournament in order to play at the 2014 Winter Olympics. The team finished the event with a 2–4 record, which was not enough to qualify. Later on, in that season, Pařízková re-joined her junior team for a final season at the 2014 World Junior Curling Championships. Pařízková was bumped to the lead position, with Hajkova taking over as skip. The team could not replicate previous successes, finishing with a 3–6 record, in 7th place.

Few days later she played with Kubešková's team at the 2014 Ford World Women's Curling Championship where they finished in 9th place. After returning form Canadas Championship her team lost Czech Nationals and could not represent the country is season 2014–15. After this season they won Czech nationals again and qualified for 2015 European Curling Championships in Esbjerg. Team skipped by Anna Kubešková finished second in B Group after losing against Italian team skipped by Apollonio and moved up to A group for next season.

In 2016 they played in the 2016 Europeans and finished in 4th place losing to the Swedish team skippered by Anna Hasselborg in the Semi finals, which also qualified them for the 2017 World Women's Curling Championship in Beijing.

In the end of the season 2016–17 team with Pařízková on the lead position won Euronics European Masters against the runner up team from Switzerland skippered by Alina Pätz.

Season 2017–18 started with winning of International Women's Curling Tournament in Wetzikon. In the November Pařízková and her team came back to Switzerland for 2017 European Curling Championships and with the record 3-6 the team could not replicate previous successes and finished in 7th place. It was enough to qualify for 2018 Ford World Women's Curling Championship in North Bay, Canada. The most important event came right after Europeans. The team played after four years another Qualification tournament because they did not score enough points from 2014 and 2015 Worlds. Olympic Qualification Tournament held place in Plzeň, Czech Republic. After round robin Pařízková and her team with Anna Kubešková as skip, Alžběta Baudyšová as third, Tereza Plíšková as second, Ezhen Kolchevskaia as alternate and coach Karel Kubeška, finished fourth and did not get chance to fight for top two places.

In March 2018 they improved Czech current best placement and finished 6th on Worlds in Canada losing Russia in play-offs (Victoria Moiseeva) with 6–6 record.

== Personal life ==
As of 2022, she is a student.
