= Martin Snítil =

Czech curler

- Curler
- Born: 20 November 1978 (age 47)

Team
- Curling club: CK Brno, Brno, CZE
- Skip: Jiří Snítil
- Third: Lukas Klima
- Second: Martin Snítil
- Lead: Jindřich Kitzberger
- Alternate: Marek Vydra

Curling career
- World Championship: 6 (2008, 2009, 2011, 2012, 2013, 2014)
- European Championship: 9 (2003, 2006, 2007, 2008, 2009, 2010, 2011, 2012, 2013)
Medal record
Curling
Representing Czech Republic
European Championships
Bronze medal – third place	2012 Karlstad
European Mixed Championship
Silver medal – second place	2008 Kitzbühel

Martin Snítil (born 20 November 1978) is a Czech curler. He currently plays second on a team skipped by his brother, Jiří.

Snítil made his international curling debut at the 2003 European Curling Championships, having coached the Czech men's team the previous season. Martin played second on the Czech team, skipped by his brother Jiří, and they finished 15th. The team returned to the European Championships in 2006, this time with Martin playing third on the team. At the 2006 European Curling Championships, they finished 11th. They improved the following season; at the 2007 European Curling Championships, they finish in 8th place, qualifying themselves for the 2008 World Men's Curling Championship- the first Czech team to qualify for the Worlds. At the 2008 Worlds, they placed in last place. The 2008-09 season was slightly better. Martin and his brother played on the Czech team at the 2008 European Mixed Curling Championship, where they won a silver medal, after losing to Germany in the final. At the 2008 European Curling Championships, they improved to a 7th-place finish, and at the 2009 Ford World Men's Curling Championship, they improved to an 11th place showing. Martin had played 2nd on the team at the Euros and third at Worlds.

In 2009-10, with Martin at third, the team finished 8th at the 2009 European Curling Championships failing to make it to the World Championships that season. The team improved the following season however, finishing 7th place at the 2010 European Curling Championships, qualifying them once again for the World Championships. At the 2011 Ford World Men's Curling Championship, the team earned their best finish at the worlds to date, placing in 8th. The next season, they had a great run at the 2011 European Curling Championships, making the playoffs for the first time. The team wound wind up placing fourth, after losing the bronze medal match to Denrmark's Rasmus Stjerne. They could not replicate their success however at the 2012 World Men's Curling Championship, where they once again finished last.

2012-13 would be the best season for the Czech team. The team would finish the round robin portion of the 2012 European Curling Championships in 2nd with a 7-2 record. However, the team lost to Norway's Thomas Ulsrud in the semi-final, before rebounding to beat the Danes in the bronze medal match. This would be a first for the country in curling, as it is the first time that the Czech Republic got a medal in international play.
