= Jindřich Kitzberger =

Czech curler (born 1981)

- Curler
- Born: 13 April 1981 (age 45)

Team
- Curling club: CK Brno, Brno, CZE
- Skip: Jiří Snítil
- Third: Lukas Klima
- Second: Martin Snítil
- Lead: Jindřich Kitzberger
- Alternate: Marek Vydra

Curling career
- World Championship: 6 (2008, 2009, 2011, 2012, 2013, 2014)
- European Championship: 8 (2003, 2006, 2007, 2008, 2009, 2011, 2012, 2013)
Medal record
Curling
Representing Czech Republic
European Championships
Bronze medal – third place	2012 Karlstad

Jindřich Kitzberger (born 13 April 1981) is a Czech curler. He currently throws lead stones for the Jiří Snítil rink.

As a junior curler, Kitzberger played in two World Junior Curling Championships. He played in the 1999 World Junior Curling Championships where he threw second stones for Vit Nekovarik. The team finished in 9th place. The team returned the following year, and at the 2000 World Junior Curling Championships they had a worse showing, finishing last, in 10th place. This finish relegated the Czech Republic to the World Juniors B Pool, and Kitzberger would not return to the main event.

In 2003, he joined the Jirí Snítil rink as the team's third, and he played in his first European Curling Championships, where the rink finished in 15th. Kitzberger would go on to play in five European Championships with Snítil (2006, 2007, 2008, 2009, 2011), finishing 11th, 8th, 7th, 8th, 4th respectively before winning a bronze medal in 2012. Kitzberger played second in all of those events except for the 2008 European Championships where he threw third stones, and the 2012 Euros where he played lead.

Kitzberger would play in his first World Curling Championships in 2008 as a member of the Snítil rink. At the 2008 World Men's Curling Championship, the rink would finish last, in 12th place. Kitzberger would return with the team to the Worlds in 2009, 2011, 2012 and 2013, finishing 11th, 8th, 12th, and TBD respectively. He played second in all four of those events.
