= Karolína Frederiksen =

Czech curler

- Curler ♀
- Born: 1 August 1981 (age 45); Chrudim, Czechoslovakia

Team
- Curling club: Savona Praha CC, Prague
- Skip: Hana Synáčková
- Third: Linda Nemčoková
- Second: Zuzana Pražáková
- Lead: Karolína Frederiksen
- Alternate: Lenka Vokounová

Curling career
- Member Association: Czech Republic
- World Championship: 1 (2007)
- World Mixed Championship: 2 (2022, 2024)
- European Championship: 2 (2004, 2006)
Medal record
Curling
European Mixed Curling Championship
Silver medal – second place	2008 Kitzbühel

Karolína Frederiksen (born 1 August 1981 in Chrudim as Karolína Pilařová) is a Czech curler who participated in the European Curling Championships in 2004, 2005, 2006 and 2009. The best result was 8th place in 2006 and then 2 out of 2 wins in a challenge game against Austria which allowed the Czech team to compete at the 2007 World Women's Curling Championships, the first time in the history of the country. The historical appearance came in Aomori, Aomori, Japan from 17–25 March, where they achieved 11th place. She participated in the 2008 European Mixed Curling Championship where she reached the finals and was awarded a silver medal.

After taking some time off from competitive curling, Frederiksen returned to represent the Czech Republic at the 2022 and 2024 World Mixed Curling Championship, finishing 15th and 9th respectively. Frederiksen was also chosen to represent the Czech women's team in their bid to qualify for the 2026 Winter Olympics, alongside Hana Synáčková, Linda Nemčoková, and Zuzana Pražáková. At the 2025 Pre-Olympic Qualification Event, they won the event, qualifying for the 2025 Olympic Qualification Event.

== Personal life ==
In 2012 she married a fellow curler and coach Sune Frederiksen and changed her surname to Frederiksen.
