= Tomáš Paul =

Czech curler (born 1988)

- Curler
- Born: 3 April 1988 (age 38); Prague

Team
- Mixed doubles partner: Zuzana Paulová

Curling career
- Member Association: Czech Republic
- World Mixed Doubles Championship: 7 (2013, 2014, 2017, 2018, 2019, 2021, 2024)
- European Championship: 2 (2015, 2018)
- Olympic: 1 (2022)
Medal record
Curling
Representing Czech Republic
World Mixed Doubles Curling Championship
Bronze medal – third place	2013 Fredericton
Winter Universiade
Bronze medal – third place	2011 Erzurum

Tomáš Paul (born 3 April 1988 in Prague) is a Czech curler.

== Curling career ==
=== Men's ===
Playing of Charles University, Paul has played in two Winter Universiades. The first was the 2011 Winter Universiade, where Paul threw second stones for the Czech team, skipped by Lukáš Klíma, winning a bronze medal. He played in the 2013 Winter Universiade as well, with Klíma skipping. They had less success, finishing in 7th place.

Paul first played for the Czech national team at the men's level at the 2015 European Curling Championships, playing second for the team skipped by David Šik. The team finished in 9th place. He played again for Šik at the 2018 European Curling Championships, this time in B Division play. They went undefeated in the round robin but faltered in the playoffs, settling for third place in the division.

=== Mixed doubles ===
In addition to regular curling, Paul plays mixed doubles. He has played in five World Mixed Doubles Curling Championships for his native Czech Republic. At his first World Championship in 2013, he and partner Zuzana Paulová ended up capturing the bronze medal. At the 2014 World Mixed Doubles Curling Championship, the pair finished in 7th, and at the 2017 World Mixed Doubles Curling Championship, they finished 4th, which would not be enough to qualify them for the 2018 Winter Olympics.

Paulová and Paul represented the Czech Republic again at the 2018 and 2019 World Mixed Doubles Curling Championships, finishing 10th in 2018 and losing in the quarterfinals in 2019.

In February 2020, Paulová and Paul won 2020 Czech Mixed Doubles Curling Championship one more time. They were set to represent the Czech Republic at the 2020 World Mixed Doubles Curling Championship before the event was cancelled due to the COVID-19 pandemic.
