= Samuel Mokriš =

Czech curler (born 1990)

- Curler
- Born: 4 July 1990 (age 36)

Team
- Skip: Lukáš Klíma
- Third: Marek Černovský
- Second: Jiří Candra
- Lead: Samuel Mokriš

Curling career
- Member Association: Czech Republic
- World Championship: 2 (2012, 2015)
- European Championship: 5 (2011, 2014, 2017, 2019, 2021)

Samuel Mokriš (born 4 July 1990) is a Czech curler. He competed at the 2015 Ford World Men's Curling Championship in Halifax, Nova Scotia, Canada, as alternate for the Czech national curling team. He also competed at the 2012 World Men's Curling Championship. Mokriš regularly plays second for the Kryštof Chaloupek rink.
