= Jiří Snítil =

Czech curler

- Curler
- Born: 24 February 1975 (age 51); Prague, Czechoslovakia

Team
- Curling club: CK Brno, Brno, CZE
- Skip: Jiří Snítil
- Third: Lukas Klima
- Second: Martin Snítil
- Lead: Jindřich Kitzberger
- Alternate: Marek Vydra

Curling career
- World Championship: 7 (2008, 2009, 2011, 2012, 2013, 2014, 2015)
- European Championship: 12 (1999, 2003, 2006, 2007, 2008, 2009, 2010, 2011, 2012, 2013, 2014, 2017)
Medal record
Curling
Representing Czech Republic
European Championships
Bronze medal – third place	2012 Karlstad
European Mixed Championship
Silver medal – second place	2008 Kitzbühel

Jiří Snítil (born 24 February 1975) is a curler from the Czech Republic. He currently skips the Czech Republic national team. He started curling at the age of 21.

Snítil has represented the Czech Republic in seven World Curling Championships (2008, 2009, 2011, 2012, 2013, 2014 and 2015). His best placing so far at a world championship was 7th in 2014.

In the 2012 European Curling Championships in Karlstad, Sweden, was a first for the country in curling, as it is the first time that the Czech Republic won a medal in an international men's event. However, Snítil did win a silver medal for the Czech Republic at the 2008 European Mixed Curling Championship.
