= Jakub Bareš =

Czech curler (born 1988)

- Curler
- Born: 20 March 1988 (age 38)

Team
- Curling club: CK Brno, Brno, CZE
- Skip: Jiří Snítil
- Third: Martin Snítil
- Second: Jindřich Kitzberger
- Lead: Jakub Bareš
- Alternate: Marek Vydra

Curling career
- World Championship: 3 (2011, 2013, 2014)
- European Championship: 3 (2010, 2012, 2013)
Medal record
Curling
Representing Czech Republic
European Championships
Bronze medal – third place	2012 Karlstad

Jakub Bareš (born 20 March 1988) is a Czech curler from Prague. He currently plays lead for the Czech national men's curling team.

As a junior curler, Bareš played in two World Junior Curling Championships. His first was the 2007 World Junior Curling Championships where he skipped the Czech team which also included Jiri Candra, Martin Hejhal and Martin Stepanek. The team did not win a single game at the event, finishing in last place. Bareš was invited to be the Czech team's alternate at the 2008 World Junior Curling Championships, skipped by Krystof Chaloupek. Bareš was barely an alternate however, as he played in 8 of the team's 9 games, including the team's lone win en route to another last place finish.

In 2009 Bareš skipped the Czech mixed team at the 2009 European Mixed Curling Championship. His team, which also included Lenka Kitzbergerova, Jindrich Kitzberger and Michaela Nadherova finished in 4th place, after losing in the semi-final to Scotland.

The next season, Bareš joined the Czech men's team as their alternate. However, due to the rotating structure of the Czech national team, Bareš would play in most games. His first international tournament as a member of the team was the 2010 European Curling Championships. The team finished in 7th place. They also played in the 2011 Ford World Men's Curling Championship, finishing 8th.

For the 2011–12 season, Bareš did not play on the team, but rejoined them in 2012 at second for the 2012 European Curling Championships. That tournament was a huge success for the national team, as they won the bronze medal. They had less success at the 2013 Ford World Men's Curling Championship, finishing 8th. Bareš returned to playing as the team's alternate at the 2013 Worlds. The team attempted to replicate their success at the 2013 European Curling Championships, but placed 7th. The team narrowly made the 2014 Winter Olympics after losing to the United States' John Shuster in the final qualifying match.
