= Lukáš Klíma (curler) =

Czech curler (born 1991)

- Curler
- Born: 19 February 1991 (age 35); Prague, Czechoslovakia

Team
- Curling club: CC Zbraslav, Zbraslav, CZE
- Skip: Lukáš Klíma
- Third: Vít Chabičovský
- Second: Martin Jurík
- Lead: Lukáš Klípa
- Mixed doubles partner: Petra Klímová

Curling career
- Member Association: Czech Republic
- World Championship: 6 (2015, 2022, 2023, 2024, 2025, 2026)
- World Mixed Doubles Championship: 2 (2012, 2026)
- European Championship: 10 (2014, 2016, 2017, 2019, 2021, 2022, 2023, 2024, 2025, 2026)
- Olympic: 1 (2026)
Medal record
Men's curling
Representing Czech Republic
Winter Universiade
Bronze medal – third place	2011 Erzurum

Lukáš Klíma (born 19 February 1991) is a Czech curler.

== Career ==
=== Juniors ===
Klíma skipped the Czech junior team at two World Junior Curling Championships. At the 2011 World Junior Curling Championships he led teammates Marek Cernovsky, Samuel Mokris and Karel Klima to a 9th-place finish (2–8 record). At the 2012 World Junior Curling Championships, he led Cernovsky, Jan Zelingr and Mokris to an 8th-place finish (2–7 record). The highlight of his junior career came at the 2011 Winter Universiade. There, he led his team of Jiri Candra, Tomáš Paul and David Jirounek to a bronze medal. After posting a 6-3 round robin record, the team beat Canada in a tie breaker, then lost to Korea in the semifinal, before beating Great Britain to claim the bronze. Klíma skipped the Czech Republic again at the 2013 Winter Universiade, but his team had less success, finishing 7th with a 3–6 record. Klíma attended Charles University in Prague. Also during his junior career, Klíma played in the 2012 World Mixed Doubles Curling Championship. Klíma and partner Petra Vinšová finished in 16th.

=== Men's ===
After juniors, Klíma joined the Jiří Snítil rink at third position. The team played at the 2014 European Curling Championships, finishing 5th.

Klíma returned to world-level curling as the skip of the Czech team alongside Marek Černovský, Martin Jurík, and Lukáš Klípa at the 2022 World Men's Curling Championship. There, the team finished with a 5–7 record. The team played at the 2022 European Curling Championships, where they finished the event with a 3–6 record, good enough to qualify the country for the 2023 World Men's Curling Championship. The team then went on to win the 2023 Czech Men's Curling Championship, qualifying the team to represent the Czech Republic at the 2023 World Men's Curling Championship, where they finished with a 3–9 record, and 10th overall. The team played in the 2023 European Curling Championships. There, the team finished with a disappointing 2–7 record, however, the result was good enough to qualify again for the 2024 World Men's Curling Championship. At the 2024 Worlds, the rink improved and went 4–8, finishing 9th.

Klíma and the Czech team would continue to improve during the 2024-25 curling season, and coached by former world champion Craig Savill, the team would again qualify for the 2025 World Men's Curling Championship. At the 2025 World's the team went 6–6 in the round robin, including wins over the current #1 ranked ranked team in the world, Scotland's Bruce Mouat, and the current European Champions, Germany's Marc Muskatewitz. This result would also tie the all-time highest placement for a Czech team at the worlds, finishing in 7th place. This strong showing earned the Czech Republic a direct berth to the 2026 Winter Olympics. At the Olympics, they would finish the round robin with a 3–6 record, finishing in 8th.

== Personal life ==
Klíma is employed as an attorney and lives in Prague.

In 2023, he married fellow curler Petra Vinšová and she changed her surname to "Klímová".
