= Karel Kubeška =

Czech curler and curling coach

- Curler
- Born: 17 June 1955 (age 71); Prague

Curling career
- Member Association: Czech Republic
- World Mixed Doubles Championship: 2 (2009, 2010)
- European Championship: 5 (1992, 1999, 2000, 2004, 2016)
- Other appearances: European Mixed Championship: 1 (2006), World Senior Championships: 2 (2015, 2017)

Karel Kubeška (born 17 June 1955) is a Czech curler and curling coach.

He was a vice-president of European Curling Federation in 2010-2014.

== Personal life ==
Karel Kubeška is a father of Anna Kubešková, one of the best Czech women curlers. Karel has coached Anna's team for a long time and played with her in mixed curling teams. He is married, has two children and works as a marketing advisor.
