= Curling at the 2012 Winter Youth Olympics – Mixed team =

Curling – Mixed team at the I Winter Youth Olympic Games
- Venue: Innsbruck Exhibition Centre
- Dates: January 14–18, 2012

Medalists
1st place, gold medalist(s)		Michael Brunner; Elena Stern; Romano Meier; Lisa Gisler	Switzerland
2nd place, silver medalist(s)		Amos Mosaner; Denise Pimpini; Alessandro Zoppi; Arianna Losano	Italy
3rd place, bronze medalist(s)		Thomas Scoffin; Corryn Brown; Derek Oryniak; Emily Gray	Canada

Mixed team curling at the 2012 Winter Youth Olympics was held from January 14 to 18 at the Innsbruck Exhibition Centre in Innsbruck, Austria.

== Teams ==
The teams are listed as follows.

=== Red Group ===
Austria	Canada	Germany	Great Britain
Skip: Mathias Genner Third: Camilla Schnabel; Second: Martin Reichel; Lead: Irena Brettbacher	Skip: Thomas Scoffin Third: Corryn Brown; Second: Derek Oryniak; Lead: Emily Gray	Skip: Daniel Rothballer Third: Frederike Manner; Second: Kevin Lehmann; Lead: Nicole Muskatewitz	Skip: Duncan Menzies Third: Angharad Ward; Second: Thomas Muirhead; Lead: Rachel Hannen
Italy	Japan	Russia	Sweden
Skip: Amos Mosaner Third: Denise Pimpini; Second: Alessandro Zoppi; Lead: Arianna Losano	Skip: Shingo Usui Third: Mizuki Kitaguchi; Second: Tsukasa Horigome; Lead: Mako Tamakuma	Skip: Mikhail Vaskov Third: Anastasia Moskaleva; Second: Alexandr Korshunov; Lead: Marina Verenich	Skip: Rasmus Wranå Third: Amalia Rudström; Second: Jordan Wåhlin; Lead: Johanna Heldin

=== Blue Group ===
China	Czech Republic	Estonia	New Zealand
Fourth: Wang Jinbo Third: Yang Ying; Skip: Bai Yang; Lead: Cao Ying	Skip: Marek Černovský Third: Alžběta Baudyšová; Second: Kryštof Krupanský; Lead: Zuzana Hrůzová	Skip: Robert-Kent Päll Third: Marie Turmann; Second: Sander Rõuk; Lead: Kerli Zirk	Skip: Luke Steele Third: Eleanor Adviento; Second: David Weyer; Lead: Kelsi Heath
Norway	South Korea	Switzerland	United States
Fourth: Martin Sesaker Third: Stine Haalien; Skip: Markus Skogvold; Lead: Ina Roll Backe	Skip: Kang Sue-yeon Third: Yoo Min-hyeon; Second: Kim Eun-bi; Lead: Go Ke-on	Skip: Michael Brunner Third: Elena Stern; Second: Romano Meier; Lead: Lisa Gisler	Skip: Korey Dropkin Third: Sarah Anderson; Second: Thomas Howell; Lead: Taylor Anderson

== Round-robin standings ==
Key
Teams to Playoffs
Teams to Tiebreakers

Final Round Robin Standings

Red Group	Skip	W	L
Sweden	Rasmus Wranå	6	1
Canada	Thomas Scoffin	5	2
Japan	Shingo Usui	4	3
Italy	Amos Mosaner	4	3
Great Britain	Duncan Menzies	3	4
Russia	Mikhail Vaskov	3	4
Austria	Mathias Genner	2	5
Germany	Daniel Rothballer	1	6

Final Round Robin Standings

Blue Group	Skip	W	L
United States	Korey Dropkin	7	0
Switzerland	Michael Brunner	6	1
Czech Republic	Marek Černovský	4	3
China	Bai Yang	3	4
Norway	Markus Skogvold	3	4
South Korea	Kang Sue-yeon	2	5
New Zealand	Luke Steele	2	5
Estonia	Robert-Kent Päll	1	6

== Round-robin results ==
All draw times are listed in Central European Time (UTC+01).

=== Red Group ===
==== Saturday, January 14 ====
Due to an electrical issue that affected the curling ice, Draw 1 for the Red Group has been moved to Tuesday, January 17 at 16:00.

Draw 2 16:00

Sheet A	1	2	3	4	5	6	7	8	Final
Austria (Genner)	0	0	0	1	0	3	0	2	6
Canada (Scoffin)	0	3	0	0	1	0	1	0	5

Sheet B	1	2	3	4	5	6	7	8	Final
Japan (Usui)	0	0	0	2	0	3	0	X	5
Italy (Mosaner)	1	0	0	0	1	0	1	X	3

Sheet C	1	2	3	4	5	6	7	8	Final
Sweden (Wranå)	4	0	0	0	0	1	0	1	6
Great Britain (Menzies)	0	1	1	0	0	0	2	0	4

Sheet D	1	2	3	4	5	6	7	8	Final
Russia (Vaskov)	0	1	0	3	1	0	1	0	6
Germany (Rothballer)	0	0	2	0	0	1	0	1	4

==== Sunday, January 15 ====
Draw 3 9:00

Sheet A	1	2	3	4	5	6	7	8	9	Final
Great Britain (Menzies)	0	0	2	0	1	0	0	1	0	4
Germany (Rothballer)	0	1	0	1	0	2	0	0	1	5

Sheet B	1	2	3	4	5	6	7	8	Final
Sweden (Wranå)	1	0	1	0	1	1	0	1	5
Russia (Vaskov)	0	1	0	1	0	0	1	0	3

Sheet C	1	2	3	4	5	6	7	8	Final
Canada (Scoffin)	0	1	0	0	1	1	3	X	6
Italy (Mosaner)	0	0	0	0	0	0	0	X	0

Sheet D	1	2	3	4	5	6	7	8	9	Final
Austria (Genner)	0	2	0	0	0	3	0	0	0	5
Japan (Usui)	1	0	0	1	0	0	2	1	2	7

Draw 4 16:00

Sheet A	1	2	3	4	5	6	7	8	Final
Sweden (Wranå)	2	1	0	0	0	1	1	0	5
Italy (Mosaner)	0	0	1	2	2	0	0	2	7

Sheet B	1	2	3	4	5	6	7	8	9	Final
Austria (Genner)	0	2	0	0	0	2	0	1	7	12
Germany (Rothballer)	0	0	1	2	1	0	1	0	0	5

Sheet C	1	2	3	4	5	6	7	8	Final
Russia (Vaskov)	0	0	2	0	1	0	1	2	6
Japan (Usui)	0	1	0	3	0	1	0	0	5

Sheet D	1	2	3	4	5	6	7	8	Final
Canada (Scoffin)	1	2	0	4	0	1	X	X	8
Great Britain (Menzies)	0	0	0	0	2	0	X	X	2

==== Monday, January 16 ====
Draw 5 9:00

Sheet A	1	2	3	4	5	6	7	8	9	Final
Japan (Usui)	0	1	0	0	0	2	0	2	2	7
Great Britain (Menzies)	1	0	0	0	2	0	2	0	0	5

Sheet B	1	2	3	4	5	6	7	8	Final
Russia (Vaskov)	0	0	0	0	1	0	X	X	1
Canada (Scoffin)	1	2	2	1	0	1	X	X	7

Sheet C	1	2	3	4	5	6	7	8	Final
Austria (Genner)	0	2	3	0	0	0	0	X	5
Sweden (Wranå)	1	0	0	2	1	1	2	X	7

Sheet D	1	2	3	4	5	6	7	8	Final
Germany (Rothballer)	0	0	2	0	1	0	0	X	3
Italy (Mosaner)	2	1	0	1	0	1	4	X	9

Draw 6 16:00

Sheet A	1	2	3	4	5	6	7	8	Final
Russia (Vaskov)	4	0	0	2	0	0	0	2	8
Austria (Genner)	0	1	1	0	1	1	1	0	5

Sheet B	1	2	3	4	5	6	7	8	Final
Italy (Mosaner)	1	0	0	2	0	2	0	0	5
Great Britain (Menzies)	0	0	3	0	1	0	2	1	7

Sheet C	1	2	3	4	5	6	7	8	Final
Japan (Usui)	0	0	3	3	2	1	X	X	9
Germany (Rothballer)	1	1	0	0	0	0	X	X	2

Sheet D	1	2	3	4	5	6	7	8	9	Final
Sweden (Wranå)	0	1	0	0	2	0	2	0	1	6
Canada (Scoffin)	1	0	1	0	0	1	0	2	0	5

==== Tuesday, January 17 ====
Draw 7 9:00

Sheet A	1	2	3	4	5	6	7	8	Final
Canada (Scoffin)	3	0	0	0	4	0	2	X	9
Japan (Usui)	0	1	0	1	0	2	0	X	4

Sheet B	1	2	3	4	5	6	7	8	Final
Germany (Rothballer)	1	1	0	1	0	1	0	X	4
Sweden (Wranå)	0	0	2	0	2	0	2	X	6

Sheet C	1	2	3	4	5	6	7	8	Final
Italy (Mosaner)	2	0	0	2	2	0	0	X	6
Austria (Genner)	0	0	1	0	0	1	1	X	3

Sheet D	1	2	3	4	5	6	7	8	Final
Great Britain (Menzies)	0	1	0	2	1	0	2	X	6
Russia (Vaskov)	1	0	1	0	0	1	0	X	3

Draw 1 16:00

Sheet A	1	2	3	4	5	6	7	8	Final
Italy (Mosaner)	1	0	3	0	0	3	0	X	7
Russia (Vaskov)	0	1	0	1	0	0	1	X	3

Sheet B	1	2	3	4	5	6	7	8	Final
Great Britain (Menzies)	1	2	1	1	4	0	X	X	9
Austria (Genner)	0	0	0	0	0	1	X	X	1

Sheet C	1	2	3	4	5	6	7	8	Final
Germany (Rothballer)	2	1	0	0	0	0	1	0	4
Canada (Scoffin)	0	0	2	1	0	2	0	1	6

Sheet D	1	2	3	4	5	6	7	8	Final
Japan (Usui)	1	0	1	0	0	1	0	1	4
Sweden (Wranå)	0	1	0	3	0	0	1	0	5

=== Blue Group ===
==== Saturday, January 14 ====
Draw 1 12:30

Sheet A	1	2	3	4	5	6	7	8	Final
South Korea (Kang)	0	0	2	1	0	0	0	X	3
Czech Republic (Černovský)	1	0	0	0	2	0	3	X	6

Sheet B	1	2	3	4	5	6	7	8	Final
Switzerland (Brunner)	1	1	0	1	0	2	1	X	6
New Zealand (Steele)	0	0	1	0	1	0	0	X	2

Sheet C	1	2	3	4	5	6	7	8	Final
Estonia (Päll)	0	0	0	0	1	0	X	X	1
United States (Dropkin)	2	2	1	4	0	1	X	X	10

Sheet D	1	2	3	4	5	6	7	8	9	Final
China (Bai)	0	0	0	0	2	0	1	1	0	4
Norway (Skogvold)	1	1	0	0	0	2	0	0	1	5

Draw 2 19:30

Sheet A	1	2	3	4	5	6	7	8	Final
New Zealand (Steele)	0	0	0	1	0	1	X	X	2
United States (Dropkin)	2	2	1	0	5	0	X	X	10

Sheet B	1	2	3	4	5	6	7	8	Final
China (Bai)	2	0	1	0	1	3	1	X	8
South Korea (Kang)	0	0	0	1	0	0	0	X	1

Sheet C	1	2	3	4	5	6	7	8	Final
Norway (Skogvold)	0	0	2	0	0	0	X	X	2
Switzerland (Brunner)	2	1	0	3	1	1	X	X	8

Sheet D	1	2	3	4	5	6	7	8	Final
Czech Republic (Černovský)	0	2	0	2	0	3	2	X	9
Estonia (Päll)	2	0	1	0	1	0	0	X	4

==== Sunday, January 15 ====
Draw 3 12:30

Sheet A	1	2	3	4	5	6	7	8	Final
Switzerland (Brunner)	1	3	3	3	2	0	X	X	12
Estonia (Päll)	0	0	0	0	0	1	X	X	1

Sheet B	1	2	3	4	5	6	7	8	Final
Norway (Skogvold)	3	0	1	0	0	0	1	0	5
Czech Republic (Černovský)	0	2	0	0	1	2	0	3	8

Sheet C	1	2	3	4	5	6	7	8	Final
United States (Dropkin)	2	0	0	0	1	0	4	X	7
South Korea (Kang)	0	0	2	1	0	1	0	X	4

Sheet D	1	2	3	4	5	6	7	8	Final
New Zealand (Steele)	1	1	2	0	0	1	0	2	7
China (Bai)	0	0	0	3	2	0	1	0	6

Draw 4 19:30

Sheet A	1	2	3	4	5	6	7	8	Final
Norway (Skogvold)	0	0	1	1	0	0	1	0	3
South Korea (Kang)	2	1	0	0	0	1	0	3	7

Sheet B	1	2	3	4	5	6	7	8	Final
New Zealand (Steele)	0	2	0	2	2	0	0	1	7
Estonia (Päll)	1	0	1	0	0	1	3	0	6

Sheet C	1	2	3	4	5	6	7	8	Final
Czech Republic (Černovský)	0	1	0	0	3	0	1	0	5
China (Bai)	1	0	2	0	0	2	0	1	6

Sheet D	1	2	3	4	5	6	7	8	Final
United States (Dropkin)	2	0	1	0	0	2	0	1	6
Switzerland (Brunner)	0	2	0	1	0	0	1	0	4

==== Monday, January 16 ====
Draw 5 12:30

Sheet A	1	2	3	4	5	6	7	8	Final
China (Bai)	1	0	0	1	0	1	0	X	3
Switzerland (Brunner)	0	1	1	0	1	0	4	X	7

Sheet B	1	2	3	4	5	6	7	8	Final
Czech Republic (Černovský)	0	0	0	0	1	0	X	X	1
United States (Dropkin)	2	4	2	2	0	1	X	X	11

Sheet C	1	2	3	4	5	6	7	8	Final
New Zealand (Steele)	1	0	2	0	0	2	1	0	6
Norway (Skogvold)	0	2	0	2	2	0	0	1	7

Sheet D	1	2	3	4	5	6	7	8	Final
Estonia (Päll)	2	0	1	0	0	1	1	2	7
South Korea (Kang)	0	0	0	3	2	0	0	0	5

Draw 6 19:30

Sheet A	1	2	3	4	5	6	7	8	Final
Czech Republic (Černovský)	0	2	2	0	3	0	2	X	9
New Zealand (Steele)	1	0	0	2	0	1	0	X	4

Sheet B	1	2	3	4	5	6	7	8	Final
South Korea (Kang)	0	0	0	1	0	1	0	X	2
Switzerland (Brunner)	1	0	1	0	3	0	1	X	6

Sheet C	1	2	3	4	5	6	7	8	Final
China (Bai)	0	2	0	2	1	0	0	2	7
Estonia (Päll)	0	0	2	0	0	0	1	0	3

Sheet D	1	2	3	4	5	6	7	8	Final
Norway (Skogvold)	1	0	1	0	1	0	0	X	3
United States (Dropkin)	0	2	0	2	0	1	1	X	6

==== Tuesday, January 17 ====
Draw 7 12:30

Sheet A	1	2	3	4	5	6	7	8	Final
United States (Dropkin)	1	1	4	0	1	1	X	X	8
China (Bai)	0	0	0	1	0	0	X	X	1

Sheet B	1	2	3	4	5	6	7	8	Final
Estonia (Päll)	2	0	1	0	0	0	X	X	3
Norway (Skogvold)	0	1	0	2	2	3	X	X	8

Sheet C	1	2	3	4	5	6	7	8	Final
South Korea (Kang)	2	3	0	1	0	0	3	X	9
New Zealand (Steele)	0	0	1	0	2	1	0	X	4

Sheet D	1	2	3	4	5	6	7	8	Final
Switzerland (Brunner)	0	1	4	0	2	0	1	X	8
Czech Republic (Černovský)	0	0	0	1	0	3	0	X	4

== Tiebreaker ==
Tuesday, January 17, 19:30

Sheet D	1	2	3	4	5	6	7	8	9	Final
China (Bai)	1	0	1	0	0	1	0	X	X	3
Norway (Skogvold)	0	2	0	3	0	0	1	X	X	6

== Playoffs ==
Quarterfinals
R2	Canada	7
B3	Czech Republic	6
R4	Italy	7
B1	United States	5
R1	Sweden	8
B4	Norway	0
R3	Japan	3
B2	Switzerland	4

Semifinals
R2	Canada	2
R4	Italy	8
R1	Sweden	4
B2	Switzerland	10

Gold Medal Game
R4	Italy (silver)	4
B2	Switzerland (gold)	6

Bronze Medal Game
R1	Sweden	4
R2	Canada (bronze)	6

=== Quarterfinals ===
Wednesday, January 18, 9:00

Sheet A	1	2	3	4	5	6	7	8	Final
Canada (Scoffin)	2	0	2	0	0	2	1	0	7
Czech Republic (Černovský)	0	2	0	2	2	0	0	0	6

Sheet B	1	2	3	4	5	6	7	8	Final
Italy (Mosaner)	0	0	1	4	0	2	0	X	7
United States (Dropkin)	0	0	0	0	2	0	3	X	5

Sheet C	1	2	3	4	5	6	7	8	Final
Sweden (Wranå)	0	0	0	2	2	1	3	X	8
Norway (Skogvold)	0	0	0	0	0	0	0	X	0

Sheet D	1	2	3	4	5	6	7	8	Final
Japan (Usui)	0	0	1	1	0	0	1	0	3
Switzerland (Brunner)	0	0	0	0	0	3	0	1	4

=== Semifinals ===
Wednesday, January 18, 13:00

Sheet D	1	2	3	4	5	6	7	8	Final
Canada (Scoffin)	0	1	0	0	1	0	0	X	2
Italy (Mosaner)	2	0	1	3	0	1	1	X	8

Sheet A	1	2	3	4	5	6	7	8	Final
Sweden (Wranå)	0	1	0	2	0	1	X	X	4
Switzerland (Brunner)	3	0	2	0	5	0	X	X	10

=== Bronze medal game ===
Wednesday, January 18, 17:00

Sheet B	1	2	3	4	5	6	7	8	Final
Canada (Scoffin)	1	0	2	0	1	1	0	1	6
Sweden (Wranå)	0	1	0	3	0	0	0	0	4

=== Gold medal game ===
Wednesday, January 18, 17:00

Sheet C	1	2	3	4	5	6	7	8	Final
Italy (Mosaner)	0	1	0	2	0	1	0	X	4
Switzerland (Brunner)	2	0	2	0	1	0	1	X	6
