= Curling at the 2012 Winter Youth Olympics – Mixed doubles =

Curling – Mixed doubles at the I Winter Youth Olympic Games
- Venue: Innsbruck Exhibition Centre
- Dates: January 20–22, 2012

Medalists
1st place, gold medalist(s)		Michael Brunner (SUI); Nicole Muskatewitz (GER)
2nd place, silver medalist(s)		Martin Sesaker (NOR); Kim Eun-bi (KOR)
3rd place, bronze medalist(s)		Korey Dropkin (USA); Marina Verenich (RUS)

Mixed doubles curling at the 2012 Winter Youth Olympics was held from January 20 to 22 at the Innsbruck Exhibition Centre in Innsbruck, Austria.

== Teams ==
The teams consisted of athletes from the mixed team tournament, one male and one female from different NOCs. The teams were selected by the organizing committee based on the final ranking from the mixed team competition in a way that balanced out the teams, and were assigned on January 19. The players in each pair were then allowed time to train together.

The teams are listed as follows:

Teams
Second: Michael Brunner (SUI) Lead: Nicole Muskatewitz (GER)	Second: Sarah Anderson (USA) Lead: Go Ke-on (KOR)	Second: Wang Jinbo (CHN) Lead: Ina Roll Backe (NOR)	Second: Camilla Schnabel (AUT) Lead: Jordan Wåhlin (SWE)
Second: Thomas Scoffin (CAN) Lead: Kelsi Heath (NZL)	Second: Mizuki Kitaguchi (JPN) Lead: Thomas Muirhead (GBR)	Second: Mikhail Vaskov (RUS) Lead: Zuzana Hrůzová (CZE)	Second: Marie Turmann (EST) Lead: Alessandro Zoppi (ITA)
Second: Elena Stern (SUI) Lead: Sander Rõuk (EST)	Second: Korey Dropkin (USA) Lead: Marina Verenich (RUS)	Second: Angharad Ward (GBR) Lead: Markus Skogvold (NOR)	Second: Luke Steele (NZL) Lead: Johanna Heldin (SWE)
Second: Corryn Brown (CAN) Lead: Martin Reichel (AUT)	Second: Shingo Usui (JPN) Lead: Cao Ying (CHN)	Second: Kang Sue-yeon (KOR) Lead: Kryštof Krupanský (CZE)	Second: Daniel Rothballer (GER) Lead: Arianna Losano (ITA)
Second: Mathias Genner (AUT) Lead: Lisa Gisler (SUI)	Second: Yang Ying (CHN) Lead: Thomas Howell (USA)	Second: Martin Sesaker (NOR) Lead: Kim Eun-bi (KOR)	Second: Amalia Rudström (SWE) Lead: Kevin Lehmann (GER)
Second: Robert-Kent Päll (EST) Lead: Emily Gray (CAN)	Second: Anastasia Moskaleva (RUS) Lead: Tsukasa Horigome (JPN)	Second: Marek Černovský (CZE) Lead: Rachel Hannen (GBR)	Second: Denise Pimpini (ITA) Lead: David Weyer (NZL)
Second: Eleanor Adviento (NZL) Lead: Romano Meier (SUI)	Second: Duncan Menzies (GBR) Lead: Taylor Anderson (USA)	Second: Stine Haalien (NOR) Lead: Alexandr Korshunov (RUS)	Second: Rasmus Wranå (SWE) Lead: Kerli Zirk (EST)
Second: Frederike Manner (GER) Lead: Derek Oryniak (CAN)	Second: Yoo Min-hyeon (KOR) Lead: Mako Tamakuma (JPN)	Second: Alžběta Baudyšová (CZE) Lead: Bai Yang (CHN)	Second: Amos Mosaner (ITA) Lead: Irena Brettbacher (AUT)

== Knockout results ==
=== Finals ===
Semifinals
1	Michael Brunner (SUI); Nicole Muskatewitz (GER)	7
4	Korey Dropkin (USA); Marina Verenich (RUS)	3
3	Martin Sesaker (NOR); Kim Eun-bi (KOR)	13
2	Yoo Min-hyeon (KOR); Mako Tamakuma (JPN)	6

Gold Medal Game
Michael Brunner (SUI); Nicole Muskatewitz (GER)	13
Martin Sesaker (NOR); Kim Eun-bi (KOR)	2
Bronze Medal Game
Korey Dropkin (USA); Marina Verenich (RUS)	6
Yoo Min-hyeon (KOR); Mako Tamakuma (JPN)	5

=== Top half ===
Round of 32
Michael Brunner (SUI); Nicole Muskatewitz (GER)	8
Sarah Anderson (USA); Go Ke-on (KOR)	6
Wang Jinbo (CHN); Ina Roll Backe (NOR)	8
Camilla Schnabel (AUT); Jordan Wåhlin (SWE)	7
Thomas Scoffin (CAN); Kelsi Heath (NZL)	9
Mizuki Kitaguchi (JPN); Thomas Muirhead (GBR)	5
Mikhail Vaskov (RUS); Zuzana Hrůzová (CZE)	10
Marie Turmann (EST); Alessandro Zoppi (ITA)	3
Elena Stern (SUI); Sander Rõuk (EST)	3
Korey Dropkin (USA); Marina Verenich (RUS)	13
Angharad Ward (GBR); Markus Skogvold (NOR)	8
Luke Steele (NZL); Johanna Heldin (SWE)	9
Corryn Brown (CAN); Martin Reichel (AUT)	6
Shingo Usui (JPN); Cao Ying (CHN)	4
Kang Sue-yeon (KOR); Kryštof Krupanský (CZE)	10
Daniel Rothballer (GER); Arianna Losano (ITA)	5

Round of 16
Michael Brunner (SUI); Nicole Muskatewitz (GER)	6
Wang Jinbo (CHN); Ina Roll Backe (NOR)	1
Thomas Scoffin (CAN); Kelsi Heath (NZL)	5
Mikhail Vaskov (RUS); Zuzana Hrůzová (CZE)	6
Korey Dropkin (USA); Marina Verenich (RUS)	10
Luke Steele (NZL); Johanna Heldin (SWE)	3
Corryn Brown (CAN); Martin Reichel (AUT)	7
Kang Sue-yeon (KOR); Kryštof Krupanský (CZE)	4

Quarterfinals
Michael Brunner (SUI); Nicole Muskatewitz (GER)	7
Mikhail Vaskov (RUS); Zuzana Hrůzová (CZE)	6
Korey Dropkin (USA); Marina Verenich (RUS)	9
Corryn Brown (CAN); Martin Reichel (AUT)	3

Semifinals
Michael Brunner (SUI); Nicole Muskatewitz (GER)	7
Korey Dropkin (USA); Marina Verenich (RUS)	3

=== Bottom half ===
Round of 32
Mathias Genner (AUT); Lisa Gisler (SUI)	2
Yang Ying (CHN); Thomas Howell (USA)	10
Martin Sesaker (NOR); Kim Eun-bi (KOR)	9
Amalia Rudström (SWE); Kevin Lehmann (GER)	3
Robert-Kent Päll (EST); Emily Gray (CAN)	2
Anastasia Moskaleva (RUS); Tsukasa Horigome (JPN)	8
Marek Černovský (CZE); Rachel Hannen (GBR)	8
Denise Pimpini (ITA); David Weyer (NZL)	5
Eleanor Adviento (NZL); Romano Meier (SUI)	7
Duncan Menzies (GBR); Taylor Anderson (USA)	8
Stine Haalien (NOR); Alexandr Korshunov (RUS)	1
Rasmus Wranå (SWE); Kerli Zirk (EST)	8
Frederike Manner (GER); Derek Oryniak (CAN)	1
Yoo Min-hyeon (KOR); Mako Tamakuma (JPN)	14
Alžběta Baudyšová (CZE); Bai Yang (CHN)	9
Amos Mosaner (ITA); Irena Brettbacher (AUT)	10

Round of 16
Yang Ying (CHN); Thomas Howell (USA)	4
Martin Sesaker (NOR); Kim Eun-bi (KOR)	10
Anastasia Moskaleva (RUS); Tsukasa Horigome (JPN)	7
Marek Černovský (CZE); Rachel Hannen (GBR)	1
Duncan Menzies (GBR); Taylor Anderson (USA)	6
Rasmus Wranå (SWE); Kerli Zirk (EST)	4
Yoo Min-hyeon (KOR); Mako Tamakuma (JPN)	9
Amos Mosaner (ITA); Irena Brettbacher (AUT)	4

Quarterfinals
Martin Sesaker (NOR); Kim Eun-bi (KOR)	7
Anastasia Moskaleva (RUS); Tsukasa Horigome (JPN)	6
Duncan Menzies (GBR); Taylor Anderson (USA)	4
Yoo Min-hyeon (KOR); Mako Tamakuma (JPN)	7

Semifinals
Martin Sesaker (NOR); Kim Eun-bi (KOR)	13
Yoo Min-hyeon (KOR); Mako Tamakuma (JPN)	6

== Knockout results ==
All draw times are listed in Central European Time (UTC+01).

=== Round of 32 ===
==== Draw 1 ====
Friday, January 20, 9:00

Sheet A	1	2	3	4	5	6	7	8	Final
Michael Brunner (SUI); Nicole Muskatewitz (GER) 🔨	0	2	0	2	0	2	1	1	8
Sarah Anderson (USA); Go Ke-on (KOR)	1	0	4	0	1	0	0	0	6

Sheet B	1	2	3	4	5	6	7	8	Final
Wang Jinbo (CHN); Ina Roll Backe (NOR) 🔨	2	2	0	1	0	2	0	1	8
Camilla Schnabel (AUT); Jordan Wåhlin (SWE)	0	0	2	0	3	0	2	0	7

Sheet C	1	2	3	4	5	6	7	8	Final
Thomas Scoffin (CAN); Kelsi Heath (NZL)	0	0	4	1	1	0	3	X	9
Mizuki Kitaguchi (JPN); Thomas Muirhead (GBR) 🔨	1	2	0	0	0	2	0	X	5

Sheet D	1	2	3	4	5	6	7	8	Final
Mikhail Vaskov (RUS); Zuzana Hrůzová (CZE) 🔨	0	5	1	1	1	1	1	X	10
Marie Turmann (EST); Alessandro Zoppi (ITA)	3	0	0	0	0	0	0	X	3

==== Draw 2 ====
Friday, January 20, 12:30

Sheet A	1	2	3	4	5	6	7	8	Final
Elena Stern (SUI); Sander Rõuk (EST) 🔨	2	0	0	0	1	0	X	X	3
Korey Dropkin (USA); Marina Verenich (RUS)	0	2	1	4	0	6	X	X	13

Dropkin and Verenich scored a perfect 6 points in the sixth end, marking the first time in Youth Olympics history that a perfect end of curling was scored.

Sheet B	1	2	3	4	5	6	7	8	Final
Angharad Ward (GBR); Markus Skogvold (NOR) 🔨	3	1	0	1	0	3	0	0	8
Luke Steele (NZL); Johanna Heldin (SWE)	0	0	3	0	1	0	4	1	9

Sheet C	1	2	3	4	5	6	7	8	Final
Corryn Brown (CAN); Martin Reichel (AUT) 🔨	1	0	0	3	0	1	1	0	6
Shingo Usui (JPN); Cao Ying (CHN)	0	1	1	0	1	0	0	1	4

Sheet D	1	2	3	4	5	6	7	8	Final
Kang Sue-yeon (KOR); Kryštof Krupanský (CZE) 🔨	3	1	0	3	0	2	1	X	10
Daniel Rothballer (GER); Arianna Losano (ITA)	0	0	2	0	3	0	0	X	5

==== Draw 3 ====
Friday, January 20, 16:00

Sheet A	1	2	3	4	5	6	7	8	Final
Mathias Genner (AUT); Lisa Gisler (SUI)	0	0	0	1	0	1	0	X	2
Yang Ying (CHN); Thomas Howell (USA) 🔨	3	1	2	0	3	0	1	X	10

Sheet B	1	2	3	4	5	6	7	8	Final
Martin Sesaker (NOR); Kim Eun-bi (KOR)	1	0	4	0	2	2	0	X	9
Amalia Rudström (SWE); Kevin Lehmann (GER) 🔨	0	1	0	1	0	0	1	X	3

Sheet C	1	2	3	4	5	6	7	8	Final
Robert-Kent Päll (EST); Emily Gray (CAN)	0	0	0	2	0	0	0	X	2
Anastasia Moskaleva (RUS); Tsukasa Horigome (JPN) 🔨	1	1	3	0	1	1	1	X	8

Sheet D	1	2	3	4	5	6	7	8	Final
Marek Černovský (CZE); Rachel Hannen (GBR)	0	2	1	2	0	0	2	1	8
Denise Pimpini (ITA); David Weyer (NZL) 🔨	2	0	0	0	2	1	0	0	5

==== Draw 4 ====
Friday, January 20, 19:30

Sheet A	1	2	3	4	5	6	7	8	9	Final
Eleanor Adviento (NZL); Romano Meier (SUI) 🔨	2	0	1	0	1	0	3	0	0	7
Duncan Menzies (GBR); Taylor Anderson (USA)	0	1	0	2	0	2	0	2	1	8

Sheet B	1	2	3	4	5	6	7	8	Final
Stine Haalien (NOR); Alexandr Korshunov (RUS) 🔨	0	0	0	0	1	0	0	X	1
Rasmus Wranå (SWE); Kerli Zirk (EST)	1	3	1	1	0	1	1	X	8

Sheet C	1	2	3	4	5	6	7	8	Final
Frederike Manner (GER); Derek Oryniak (CAN)	0	0	0	1	0	0	X	X	1
Yoo Min-hyeon (KOR); Mako Tamakuma (JPN) 🔨	3	2	3	0	5	1	X	X	14

Sheet D	1	2	3	4	5	6	7	8	Final
Alžběta Baudyšová (CZE); Bai Yang (CHN)	0	0	0	5	1	0	3	0	9
Amos Mosaner (ITA); Irena Brettbacher (AUT) 🔨	1	1	1	0	0	4	0	3	10

=== Round of 16 ===
==== Draw 1 ====
Saturday, January 21, 9:00

Sheet A	1	2	3	4	5	6	7	8	Final
Corryn Brown (CAN); Martin Reichel (AUT) 🔨	1	1	1	2	0	1	1	0	7
Kang Sue-yeon (KOR); Kryštof Krupanský (CZE)	0	0	0	0	2	0	0	2	4

Sheet B	1	2	3	4	5	6	7	8	Final
Anastasia Moskaleva (RUS); Tsukasa Horigome (JPN) 🔨	1	0	2	2	1	1	X	X	7
Marek Černovský (CZE); Rachel Hannen (GBR)	0	1	0	0	0	0	X	X	1

Sheet C	1	2	3	4	5	6	7	8	Final
Korey Dropkin (USA); Marina Verenich (RUS) 🔨	1	0	5	0	1	2	1	X	10
Luke Steele (NZL); Johanna Heldin (SWE)	0	1	0	2	0	0	0	X	3

Sheet D	1	2	3	4	5	6	7	8	Final
Yang Ying (CHN); Thomas Howell (USA)	0	3	0	0	0	1	0	X	4
Martin Sesaker (NOR); Kim Eun-bi (KOR) 🔨	2	0	2	1	2	0	3	X	10

==== Draw 2 ====
Saturday, January 21, 13:00

Sheet A	1	2	3	4	5	6	7	8	Final
Thomas Scoffin (CAN); Kelsi Heath (NZL)	0	1	0	1	1	0	2	0	5
Mikhail Vaskov (RUS); Zuzana Hrůzová (CZE) 🔨	2	0	1	0	0	1	0	2	6

Sheet B	1	2	3	4	5	6	7	8	Final
Yoo Min-hyeon (KOR); Mako Tamakuma (JPN) 🔨	2	0	3	1	1	0	2	X	9
Amos Mosaner (ITA); Irena Brettbacher (AUT)	0	1	0	0	0	3	0	X	4

Sheet C	1	2	3	4	5	6	7	8	Final
Michael Brunner (SUI); Nicole Muskatewitz (GER) 🔨	1	1	1	1	1	0	1	X	6
Wang Jinbo (CHN); Ina Roll Backe (NOR)	0	0	0	0	0	1	0	X	1

Sheet D	1	2	3	4	5	6	7	8	Final
Duncan Menzies (GBR); Taylor Anderson (USA) 🔨	1	0	0	2	1	0	0	2	6
Rasmus Wranå (SWE); Kerli Zirk (EST)	0	1	1	0	0	1	1	0	4

=== Quarterfinals ===
Saturday, January 21, 17:00

Sheet A	1	2	3	4	5	6	7	8	9	Final
Martin Sesaker (NOR); Kim Eun-bi (KOR) 🔨	0	3	0	1	0	0	1	1	1	7
Anastasia Moskaleva (RUS); Tsukasa Horigome (JPN)	1	0	2	0	1	2	0	0	0	6

Sheet B	1	2	3	4	5	6	7	8	Final
Michael Brunner (SUI); Nicole Muskatewitz (GER)	0	0	1	2	1	0	3	1	8
Mikhail Vaskov (RUS); Zuzana Hrůzová (CZE) 🔨	1	1	0	0	0	1	0	0	3

Sheet C	1	2	3	4	5	6	7	8	Final
Duncan Menzies (GBR); Taylor Anderson (USA) 🔨	1	0	0	1	0	1	1	0	4
Yoo Min-hyeon (KOR); Mako Tamakuma (JPN)	0	2	1	0	3	0	0	1	7

Sheet D	1	2	3	4	5	6	7	8	Final
Korey Dropkin (USA); Marina Verenich (RUS)	1	2	2	0	4	0	0	X	9
Corryn Brown (CAN); Martin Reichel (AUT) 🔨	0	0	0	1	0	1	1	X	3

=== Semifinals ===
Sunday, January 22, 9:00

Sheet A	1	2	3	4	5	6	7	8	Final
Michael Brunner (SUI); Nicole Muskatewitz (GER)	1	1	0	2	0	3	0	X	7
Korey Dropkin (USA); Marina Verenich (RUS) 🔨	0	0	1	0	1	0	1	X	3

Sheet D	1	2	3	4	5	6	7	8	Final
Martin Sesaker (NOR); Kim Eun-bi (KOR) 🔨	0	5	0	2	0	2	1	3	13
Yoo Min-hyeon (KOR); Mako Tamakuma (JPN)	2	0	1	0	3	0	0	0	6

=== Bronze Medal Game ===
Sunday, January 22, 13:00

Sheet B	1	2	3	4	5	6	7	8	9	Final
Korey Dropkin (USA); Marina Verenich (RUS) 🔨	1	0	1	0	2	0	1	0	1	6
Yoo Min-hyeon (KOR); Mako Tamakuma (JPN)	0	1	0	1	0	1	0	2	0	5

=== Gold Medal Game ===
Sunday, January 22, 13:00

Sheet C	1	2	3	4	5	6	7	8	Final
Michael Brunner (SUI); Nicole Muskatewitz (GER) 🔨	3	2	0	4	0	4	X	X	13
Martin Sesaker (NOR); Kim Eun-bi (KOR)	0	0	1	0	1	0	X	X	2
