= Daniel Rothballer =

German curler (born 1994)

- Curler ♂
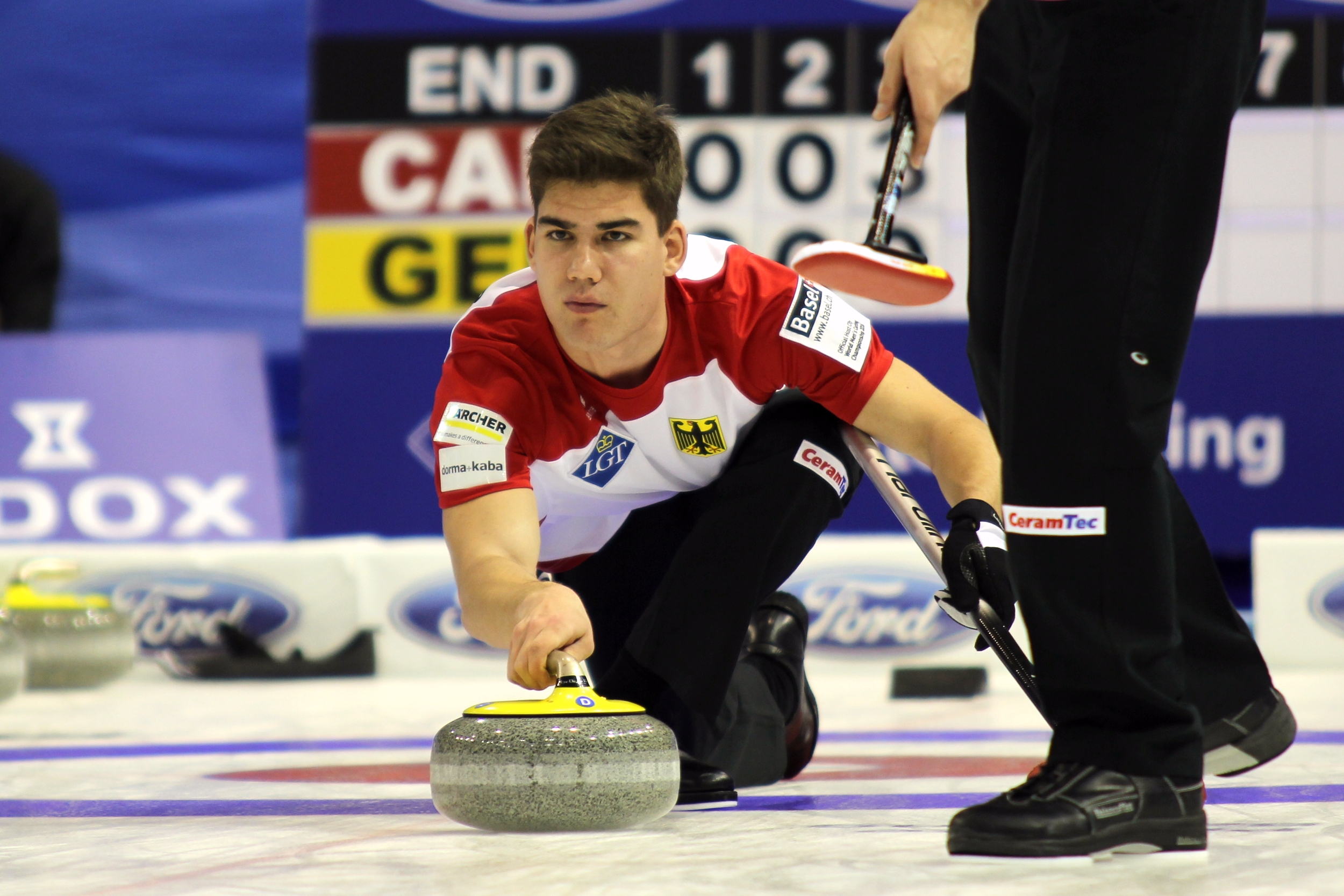
- Born: 14 February 1994 (age 32)

Curling career
- Member Association: Germany
- World Championship: 1 (2016)
- Other appearances: European Junior Challenge: 2 (2014, 2015), Youth Olympic Games: 1 (2012)
Medal record
Curling

Daniel Rothballer (born 14 February 1994) is a German curler.

== Teams ==
=== Men's ===
Season	Skip	Third	Second	Lead	Alternate	Coach	Events
2013–14	Marc Muskatewitz	Daniel Rothballer	Michael Holzinger	Pirmin Schlicke	Sebastian Oswald	Katja Weisser	EJCC 2014 (5th)
2013–14	Marc Muskatewitz	Daniel Rothballer	Michael Wiest	Sebastian Oswald			GJCC 2014 (gold)
2014–15	Marc Muskatewitz	Daniel Rothballer	Michael Wiest	Sebastian Oswald	Merlin Litke	Thomas Lips	EJCC 2015 (5th)
2015–16	Alexander Baumann	Manuel Walter	Marc Muskatewitz	Sebastian Schweizer	Daniel Rothballer	Thomas Lips	WCC 2016 (12th)

=== Mixed ===
Season	Skip	Third	Second	Lead	Coach	Events
2011–12	Daniel Rothballer	Frederike Manner	Kevin Lehmann	Nicole Muskatewitz	Holger Höhne	WYOG 2012 (15th)

=== Mixed doubles ===
Season	Male	Female	Coach	Events
2011–12	Daniel Rothballer	Arianna Losano	Holger Höhne	WYOG 2012 (17th)
