= Marek Černovský =

Czech curler (born 1994)

- Curler ♂
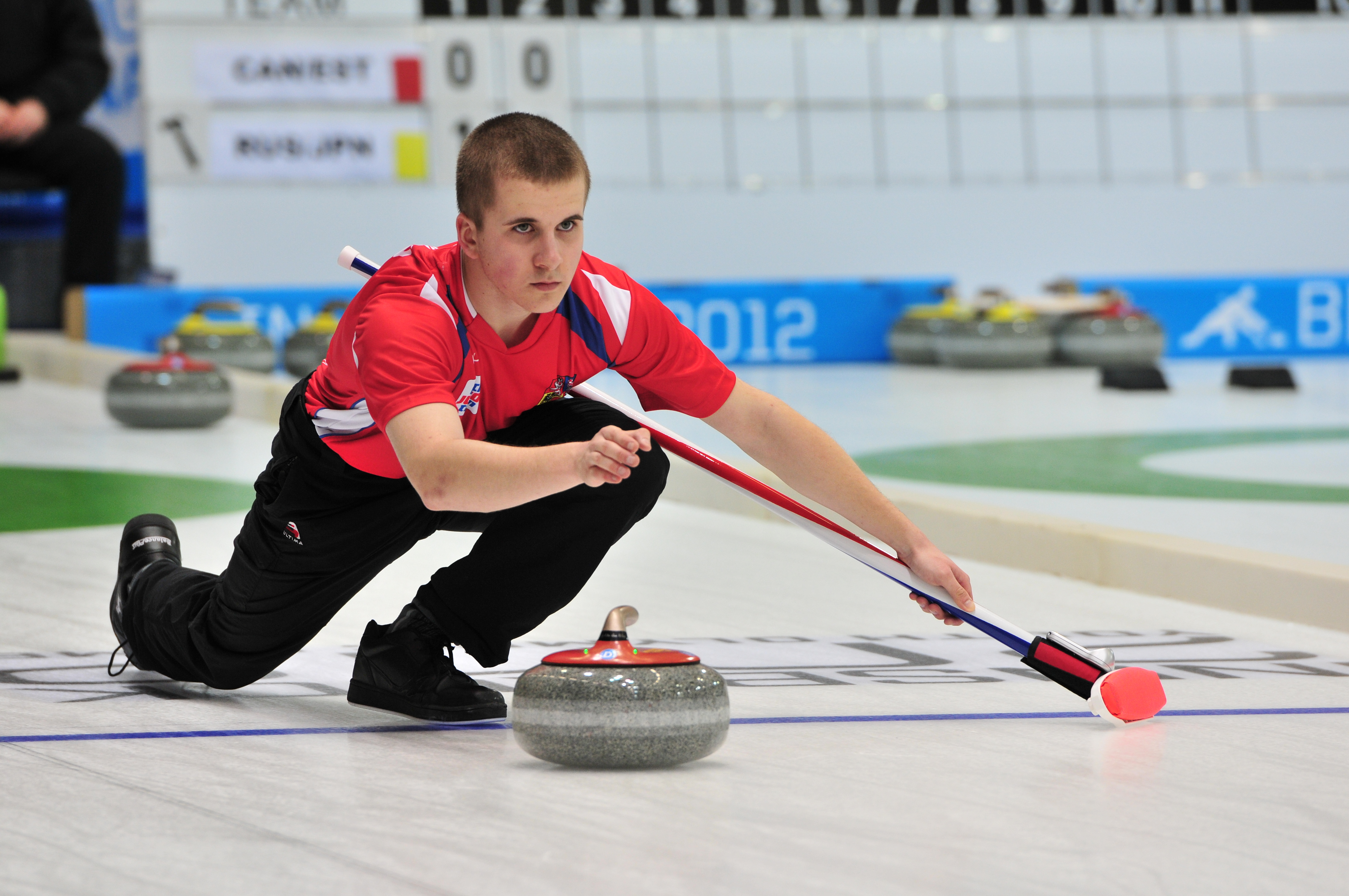
- Černovský at the 2012 Winter Youth Olympics
- Born: 28 October 1994 (age 32); Prague, Czech Republic

Team
- Curling club: CC Dion, Prague, CK Brno, Brno

Curling career
- Member Association: Czech Republic
- World Championship: 5 (2022, 2023, 2024, 2025, 2026)
- European Championship: 7 (2019, 2021, 2022, 2023, 2024, 2025, 2026)
- Olympic: 1 (2026)
- Other appearances: World Mixed Championship: 1 (2018), European Mixed Championship: 1 (2010), Youth Olympic Games: 1 (2012), Winter Universiade: 2 (2017, 2019), World Junior Championships: 3 (2011, 2012, 2013)
Medal record
Curling
Czech Men's Championship
Gold medal – first place	2019
Gold medal – first place	2020
Gold medal – first place	2022
Gold medal – first place	2023
Gold medal – first place	2024
Silver medal – second place	2013
Silver medal – second place	2016
Silver medal – second place	2017
Silver medal – second place	2018

Marek Černovský (born 28 October 1994 in Prague) is a Czech curler.

At the national level, he is a four-time Czech men's champion curler (2019, 2020, 2022 and 2023) and two-time Czech mixed champion curler (2018, 2019).

== Career ==
=== Juniors ===
Černovský would first join the Czech junior team as a second in 2009, alongside skip Lukáš Klíma, Petr Kral, and Samuel Mokriš. The team would find success, finishing third at the 2010 European Junior Curling Challenge. The following season, the Czech team would win the 2011 European Junior Curling Challenge, qualifying for the 2011 World Junior Curling Championships. At the World Juniors, they finished in 9th-place finish with a 2–8 record. Černovský would move to third on the Klíma rink alongside Jan Zelingr and Mokris for the 2012 World Junior Curling Championships, where they would slightly improve, finishing in 8th.

Černovský would be selected to skip the Czech mixed team at the 2012 Winter Youth Olympics, alongside Alžběta Baudyšová, Kryštof Krupanský, and Zuzana Hrůzová. At the Youth Olympics, the team had a strong showing, finishing 4–3 in the round robin, but losing to Canada's Thomas Scoffin 7–6 in the quarterfinals. Černovský would also skip the junior men's team at the 2013 World Junior Curling Championships, alongside Zelingr, Kryštof Krupanský, and Jakub Splavec. They would finish a disappointing 10th, going winless in the round-robin.

Černovský would reunite with former skip Klíma, as well as Martin Jurík and Samuel Mokriš to represent the Czech Republic at the 2017 Winter Universiade. At the 2017 Winter Universaide, the team would go 6–3 in the round robin, but lose to Norway's Steffen Walstad 7–3 in the bronze medal game to finish in 4th. Černovský would make his final junior appearance at the 2019 Winter Universiade, as the third on Jaroslav Vedral's team. At the 2019 Winter Universiade, the team would go 5–4 in the round robin, and lose to Switzerland's Yannick Schwaller 8–4 in the quarterfinals.

=== Men's ===
Černovský would join forces with former junior teammate Lukáš Klíma at third of the Czech men's national team alongside Martin Jurík, and Lukáš Klípa at the 2022 World Men's Curling Championship. There, the team finished with a 5–7 record. The team played at the 2022 European Curling Championships, where they finished the event with a 3–6 record, good enough to qualify the country for the 2023 World Men's Curling Championship. The team then went on to win the 2023 Czech Men's Curling Championship, qualifying the team to represent the Czech Republic at the 2023 World Men's Curling Championship, where they finished with a 3–9 record, and 10th overall.The team played in the 2023 European Curling Championships. There, the team finished with a disappointing 2–7 record, however, the result was good enough to qualify again for the 2024 World Men's Curling Championship. At the 2024 Worlds, the rink improved and went 4–8, finishing 9th.

Černovský and the Czech team would continue to improve during the 2024-25 curling season, and would be coached by Canadian and former world champion Craig Savill, and qualify for the 2025 World Men's Curling Championship. At the 2025 World's the team went 6–6 in the round robin, including wins over the current #1 ranked ranked team in the world, Scotland's Bruce Mouat, and the current European Champions, Germany's Marc Muskatewitz. This result would also tie the all-time highest placement for a Czech team at the worlds, finishing in 7th place. This strong showing earned the Czech Republic a direct berth to the 2026 Winter Olympics.

== Personal life ==
He started curling in 2004 at the age of 10. Černovský works as a travel agency associate.

== Teams ==
=== Men's ===
Season	Skip	Third	Second	Lead	Alternate	Coach	Events
2009–10	Petr Kral (fourth)	Lukáš Klíma (skip)	Marek Černovský	Samuel Mokriš	Jiri Deyl		EJCC 2010 (bronze)
2010–11	Lukáš Klíma	Marek Černovský	Jan Zelingr	Samuel Mokriš	Karel Klima	Kryštof Chaloupek	EJCC 2011 (gold)
2010–11	Lukáš Klíma	Marek Černovský	Samuel Mokriš	Karel Klima	Jakub Splavec	Kryštof Chaloupek	WJCC 2011 (9th)
2011–12	Krystof Tabery	Marek Černovský	Samuel Mokriš	Ondrej Halek	Ondrej Hurtik		
2011–12	Lukáš Klíma	Marek Černovský	Jan Zelingr	Samuel Mokriš	Jakub Splavec	David Jirounek	WJCC 2012 (8th)
2012–13	Krystof Tabery	Marek Černovský	Samuel Mokriš	Ondrej Halek	Ondrej Hurtik		
2012–13	Marek Černovský	Kryštof Krupanský	Jan Zelingr	Jakub Splavec	Štěpán Hron	David Jirounek	WJCC 2013 (10th)
2012–13	Marek Černovský	Petr Horák	Kryštof Krupanský	Štěpán Hron	Jan Zelingr	Petr Horák	CMCC 2013 (silver)
2013–14	Marek Černovský	Jakub Splavec	Kryštof Krupanský	Štěpán Hron	Jan Zelingr	Sune Frederiksen	EJCC 2014 (bronze)
2015–16	Krystof Tabery	Marek Černovský	Samuel Mokriš	Ondrej Halek	Ondrej Hurtik	Vladimír Černovský	CMCC 2016 (silver)
2016–17	Lukáš Klíma	Marek Černovský	Martin Jurík	Samuel Mokriš	Jakub Splavec	Karel Kubeška	WUG 2017 (4th)
2016–17	Krystof Tabery	Marek Černovský	Samuel Mokriš	Ondrej Hurtik	Ondrej Halek	Vladimír Černovský	CMCC 2017 (silver)
2017–18	Krystof Tabery	Marek Černovský	Samuel Mokriš	Ondrej Hurtik		Vladimír Černovský	CMCC 2018 (silver)
2018–19	Jaroslav Vedral	Marek Černovský	Krystof Krupansky	Lukáš Klípa	David Verner	Brad Askew	WUG 2019 (6th)
2018–19	Lukáš Klíma	Marek Černovský	Jiří Candra	Samuel Mokriš		Lenka Černovská	CMCC 2019 (gold)
2019–20	Lukáš Klíma	Marek Černovský	Jiří Candra	Samuel Mokriš	Radek Boháč	Craig Savill	ECC 2019 (11th)
2019–20	Lukáš Klíma	Marek Černovský	Jiří Candra	Samuel Mokriš		Jan Zelingr	CMCC 2020 (gold)
2021–22	Lukáš Klíma	Marek Černovský	Radek Boháč	Jiří Candra	Samuel Mokriš	Craig Savill	ECC 2021 (7th); OQE 2021 (bronze); CMCC 2022 (gold); WMCC 2022 (9th)
2022–23	Lukáš Klíma	Marek Černovský	Radek Boháč	Martin Jurík	Lukáš Klípa	Craig Savill	ECC 2022 (7th); CMCC 2023 (gold); WMCC 2023 (10th)
2023–24	Lukáš Klíma	Marek Černovský	Martin Jurík	Lukáš Klípa	Radek Boháč	Craig Savill	ECC 2023 (8th); CMCC 2024 (gold); WMCC 2024 (9th)
2024–25	Lukáš Klíma	Marek Černovský	Martin Jurík	Lukáš Klípa	Radek Boháč	Craig Savill	ECC 2024 (8th); CMCC 2025 (gold); WMCC 2025 (7th)
2025–26	Lukáš Klíma	Marek Černovský	Martin Jurík	Lukáš Klípa	Radek Boháč	Craig Savill	ECC 2025 (6th); WOG 2026 (8th); WMCC 2026 (10th)

=== Mixed ===
Season	Skip	Third	Second	Lead	Alternate	Coach	Events
2010–11	Radek Boháč	Sára Jahodová	Petr Horák	Klára Boušková	Lenka Černovská, Marek Cernovský		EMxCC 2010 (11th)
2011–12	Marek Cernovský	Alžběta Baudyšová	Kryštof Krupanský	Zuzana Hrůzová		Vlastimil Vojtus	WYOG 2012 (6th)
2015–16	Marek Cernovský (fourth)	Lenka Černovská	Vladimír Černovský (skip)	Dana Chabičovská	Jana Wenzlová		CMxCC 2016 (silver)
2017–18	Lukáš Klíma	Petra Vinšová	Marek Černovský	Michaela Baudyšová		Jakub Bareš	CMxCC 2018 (gold)
2018–19	Lukáš Klíma	Petra Vinšová	Marek Černovský	Michaela Baudyšová		Jakub Bareš (WMxCC)	WMxCC 2018 (9th); CMxCC 2019 (gold)

=== Mixed doubles ===
Season	Female	Male	Coach	Events
2011–12	(United Kingdom) Rachel Hannen	(Czech Republic) Marek Černovský	Brad Askew	WYOG 2012 (9th)
2012–13	Eliška Srnská	Marek Černovský		CMDCC 2012 (bronze)
