= Yang Ying (curler) =

Chinese curler

- Curler
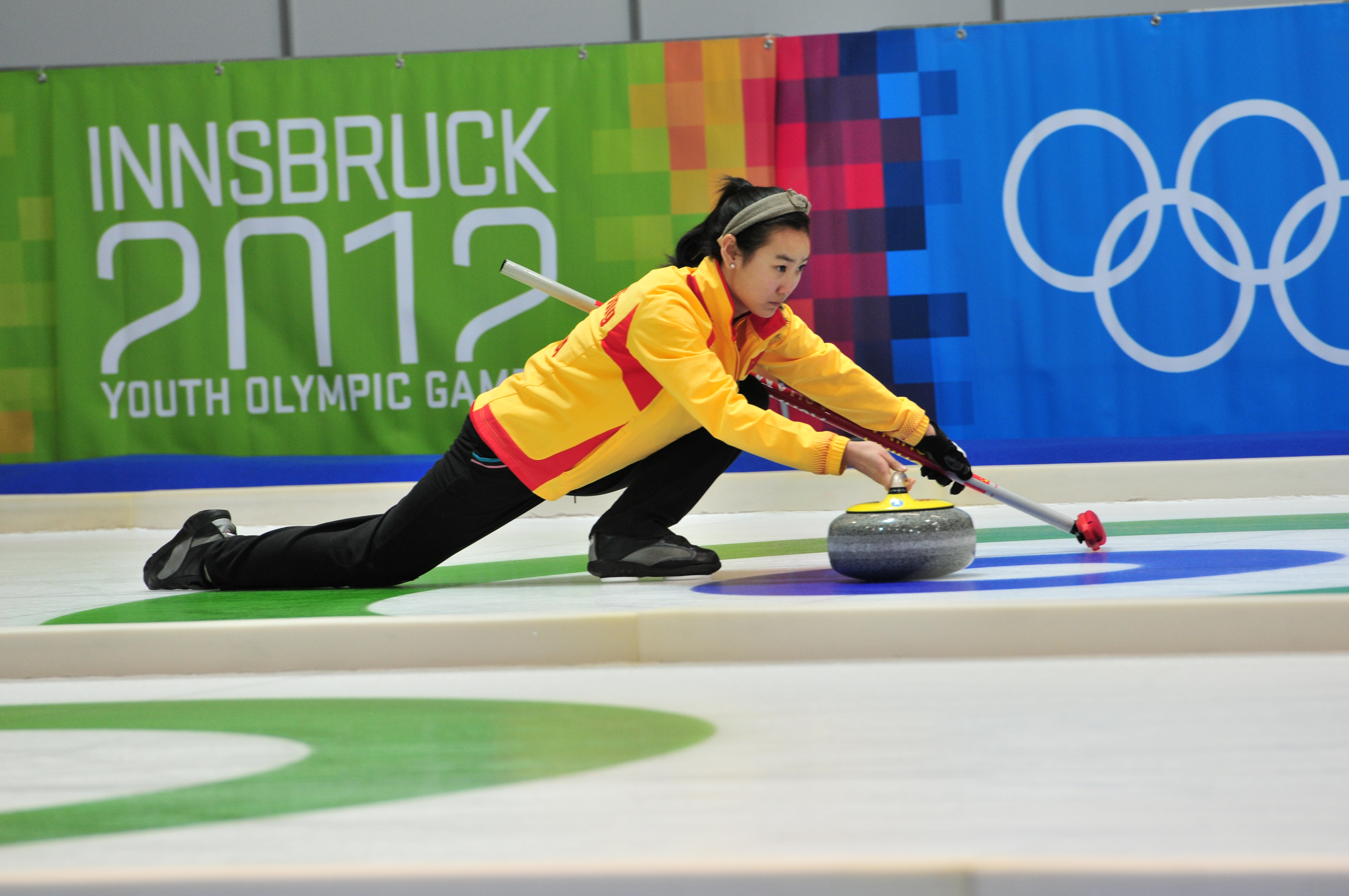
- Born: October 31, 1994 (age 32)

Team
- Curling club: Harbin CC, Harbin
- Mixed doubles partner: Tian Jiafeng

Curling career
- Member Association: China
- World Championship: 1 (2017)
- World Mixed Doubles Championship: 2 (2021, 2024)
- Pacific-Asia Championship: 1 (2016)
- Other appearances: Youth Olympic Games: 1 (2012 - mixed, mixed doubles), Winter Universiade: 1 (2019), Asian Winter Games: 1 (2017)
Medal record
Curling
Representing China
Pacific-Asia Championships
| Silver medal – second place | 2016 Uiseong |
Asian Winter Games
| Gold medal – first place | 2017 Sapporo |

Yang Ying (Chinese: 杨莹, born October 31, 1994) is a Chinese female curler. She currently plays lead on Team Wang Rui.

At the international level, she is a 2016 Pacific-Asia silver medallist and a 2017 Asian Winter Games champion.

== Teams ==
=== Women's ===
| Season | Skip | Third | Second | Lead | Alternate | Coach | Events |
|---|---|---|---|---|---|---|---|
| 2014–15 | Fu Yiwei | Sun Chengyu | Yang Ying | She Qiutong | Zhang Lijun | | |
| 2015–16 | Zheng Chunmei (fourth) | Mei Jie | Fu Yiwei | Yang Ying (skip) | Yu Xinna | | |
| 2016–17 | Wang Bingyu | Zhou Yan | Liu Jinli | Yang Ying | Mei Jie | Tan Weidong | PACC 2016 (silver) |
| 2016–17 | Zheng Chunmei (fourth) | Mei Jie | Fu Yiwei | Yang Ying (skip) | Yu Xinna | | |
| 2016–17 | Wang Bingyu | Wang Rui | Liu Jinli | Zhou Yan | Yang Ying | Tan Weidong | AWG 2017 (gold); WCC 2017 (11th) |
| 2017–18 | Mei Jie | Cao Ying | Fu Yiwei | Yang Ying | | | |
| 2018–19 | Yang Ying | He Ying | Meng Xu | Sun Chengyu | | Liu Yin | CWC/2 (8th) |
| 2018–19 | Yang Ying | Wang Zixin | Cao Ying | Sun Chengyu | Li He | Zhou Yan | WUG 2019 (6th) |
| 2022–23 | Wang Meini | Zhang Lijun | Yang Ying | Ding Xuexin | | Marco Mariani, Sören Grahn | |
| 2023–24 | Wang Rui | Guo Yanan | Dong Ziqi | Yang Ying | | | |

=== Mixed ===
| Season | Skip | Third | Second | Lead | Coach | Events |
|---|---|---|---|---|---|---|
| 2011–12 | Wang Jinbo (fourth) | Yang Ying | Bai Yang (skip) | Cao Ying | Li Hongchen | WYOG 2012 (9th) |

=== Mixed doubles ===
| Season | Female | Male | Coach | Events |
|---|---|---|---|---|
| 2011–12 | Yang Ying | Thomas Howell | Li Hongchen | WYOG 2012 (9th) |
| 2019–20 | Yang Ying | Ling Zhi | Tomi Rantamäki | WMDQE 2019 (bronze) |
| 2020–21 | Yang Ying | Ling Zhi | Tomi Rantamäki | WMDCC 2021 (9th) |
| 2023–24 | Yang Ying | Tian Jiafeng | Zhou Yan | WMDCC 2024 (12th) |
| 2024–25 | Yang Ying | Tian Jiafeng | | |
