= Duncan Menzies (curler) =

Scottish curler (born 1994)

- Curler
- Born: 25 February 1994 (age 32); Arbroath, Angus, Scotland

Team
- Curling club: Letham Grange CC, Forfar, SCO

Curling career
- Member Association: Scotland
- World Championship: 1 (2022)
- European Championship: 3 (2016, 2019, 2026)
- Grand Slam victories: 1 (2018 National)
Medal record
Men's curling
Representing Scotland
European Championships
Gold medal – first place	2026 Ostrava
Bronze medal – third place	2019 Helsingborg
World Junior Championships
Silver medal – second place	2014 Flims
Bronze medal – third place	2015 Tallinn
Scottish Men's Championships
Gold medal – first place	2022 Dumfries
Bronze medal – third place	2019 Perth
Bronze medal – third place	2020 Perth
Scottish Mixed Doubles Championship
Gold medal – first place	2018 Glasgow

Duncan Menzies (/ˈmɪŋɪs/; born 25 February 1994 in Arbroath, Angus, Scotland) is a Scottish curler.

== Teams ==
=== Men's ===
Season	Skip	Third	Second	Lead	Alternate	Coach	Events
2011–12	Duncan Menzies	Stuart Taylor	Robert Fawns	Angus Dowell			
2012–13	Bruce Mouat	Duncan Menzies	Derrick Sloan	Angus Dowell			
2013–14	Bruce Mouat	Duncan Menzies	Derrick Sloan	Angus Dowell		Colin Morrison	SJCC 2014 (4th)
2013–14	Kyle Smith	Thomas Muirhead	Kyle Waddell	Cameron Smith	Duncan Menzies	David Ramsay	WJCC 2014 (silver)
2014–15	Bruce Mouat	Duncan Menzies	Derrick Sloan	Angus Dowell	Bobby Lammie (WJCC)	Colin Morrison	SJCC 2015 (gold); WJCC 2015 (bronze)
2014–15	Kyle Smith	Grant Hardie	Kyle Waddell	Cameron Smith	Duncan Menzies		SMCC 2015 (6th)
2015–16	Bruce Mouat	Duncan Menzies	Bobby Lammie	Gregor Cannon	Angus Dowell		SMCC 2016 (4th)
2016–17	Tom Brewster	Glen Muirhead	Ross Paterson	Hammy McMillan Jr.	Duncan Menzies	Mike Harris	ECC 2016 (6th)
2016–17	Grant Hardie	Blair Fraser	David Reid	Duncan Menzies		Robin Halliday	SMCC 2017 (5th)
2017–18	Tom Brewster	Duncan Menzies	Scott Andrews	Alasdair Schreiber			SMCC 2018 (6th)
2018–19	Ross Paterson	Kyle Waddell	Duncan Menzies	Michael Goodfellow	Tom Brewster (CWC)	Ian Tetley	CWC/3 (bronze); SMCC 2019 (bronze); CWC/final (bronze)
2019–20	Ross Paterson	Kyle Waddell	Duncan Menzies	Michael Goodfellow	Craig Waddell	Ian Tetley	ECC 2019 (bronze)
2020–21	Ross Paterson	Kyle Waddell	Duncan Menzies	Michael Goodfellow			
2021–22	Ross Paterson	Kyle Waddell	Duncan Menzies	Craig Waddell			SMCC 2022 (gold); WMCC 2022 (5th)
2022–23	Cameron Bryce	Duncan Menzies	Luke Carson	Robin McCall			SMCC 2023 (6th)
2023–24	Cameron Bryce	Duncan Menzies	Luke Carson	Robin McCall			
2024–25	Cameron Bryce	Duncan Menzies	Luke Carson	Robin McCall			
2025–26	Cameron Bryce	Duncan Menzies	Scott Hyslop	Robin McCall			

=== Mixed ===
Season	Skip	Third	Second	Lead	Events
2011–12	Duncan Menzies	Angharad Ward	Thomas Muirhead	Rachel Hannen	WYOG 2012 (10th)
2014–15	Tom Brewster	Kim Brewster	Duncan Menzies	Karen Barthelemy	SMxCC 2015 (bronze)
2015–16	Blair Fraser	Rowena Kerr	Duncan Menzies	Abigail Brown	SMxCC 2016 (silver)
2016–17	Duncan Menzies	Naomi Brown	Mark Munro	Rachel Hannen	SMxCC 2017 (5th)

=== Mixed doubles ===
Season	Male	Female	Coach	Events
2011–12	Duncan Menzies	Taylor Anderson	Wally Henry	WYOG 2012 (5th)
2016–17	Duncan Menzies	Hazel Smith		SMDCC 2017 (7th)
2018–19	Duncan Menzies	Gina Aitken		SMDCC 2018 (gold)
