= 2025 World Men's Curling Championship =

2025 edition of the World Men's Curling Championship

- Host city: Moose Jaw, Saskatchewan, Canada
- Arena: Temple Gardens Centre
- Dates: March 29 – April 6
- Attendance: 77,985
- Winner: Scotland
- Curling club: Curl Edinburgh, Edinburgh
- Skip: Bruce Mouat
- Third: Grant Hardie
- Second: Bobby Lammie
- Lead: Hammy McMillan Jr.
- Alternate: Kyle Waddell
- Coach: Michael Goodfellow
- Finalist: Switzerland (Schwaller)

The 2025 World Men's Curling Championship (66th) (branded as the 2025 BKT Tires World Men's Curling Championship for sponsorship reasons) was held from March 29 to April 6 at Temple Gardens Centre in Moose Jaw, Saskatchewan, Canada. It was the fourth World Men's Championship held in Saskatchewan and the third World Championship held in Moose Jaw, succeeding the 1979 World Junior Curling Championships and the 1983 Pioneer Life World Women's Curling Championship. This event was the last men's event to earn Qualification Points for the 2026 Winter Olympics.

The format for the Championship featured a thirteen team round robin. The top six teams qualified for the playoff round where the top two teams received a bye while the remaining four played in the qualification round to qualify for the semifinals.

== Summary ==
Prior to the event, there was concern the US national team would get booed by the home Canadian fans due to ongoing political tensions between the two countries, which had resulted in the US anthem getting booed in other sports. However, it was reported that "not a single boo could be heard" during the Star-Spangled Banner when it was played ahead of the March 30 draw. When Canada played the US on the evening of April 4, some boos could be heard when the US team were introduced. Before the game, Canada skip Brad Jacobs stated "I'm like everyone else. I don't like hearing some of this stuff south of the border, calling Canada the 51st state".

In Draw 14, Austria (skipped by Mathias Genner) won its first game at the World Men's Championship since 1983, when they beat the also-winless South Koreans, 11–4.

Following an April 3 evening win against Switzerland, Canada, skipped by Brad Jacobs became the first team to clinch a playoff berth. Canada clinched first place in the round robin after defeating Austria in the afternoon of April 4. Scotland, skipped by Bruce Mouat secured a playoff spot in their April 4 morning game against Germany. Switzerland, Sweden, Norway and China secured their spots in the afternoon draw, while the ranking of the six team was determined after the final evening draw. Switzerland, skipped by Yannick Schwaller got the second seed, and earned a bye to the semifinals along with Canada. In the quarters, number three China would go on to face number six Norway, while Scotland would play Sweden in the other quarterfinal.

Controversy arose after Chinese curler Li Zhichao was caught allegedly cheating in their quarterfinal game against Norway. On a stone delivered by China skip Xu Xiaoming, Li was seen to have "swung his brush handle" against the rock, altering its trajectory, just before it was about to hit a guard, causing the rock to "jump". After a technical timeout, the Norwegian team decided to let the matter go, and did not file a complaint. The event was not an isolated incident, as China had been accused of kicking a stone in their round robin game against Germany, which may have resulted in a loss of a potential point for the Germans. China went on to win the quarterfinal match, 8–7, while Scotland beat Sweden in the other quarter, also 8–7.

In the semifinals, the number one ranked Canadian team were upset by the Scots, 7–4, while Switzerland easily beat China 7–3. In the Canada–Scotland game, Team Canada skip Brad Jacobs was forced to try an angle-raise triple-takeout on his last shot in an attempt to win, but missed, giving up a steal of two.

With their semifinal losses, Canada and China faced off against each other in the bronze medal game. In the match, Canada was aggressive from the get-go. Canada skip Brad Jacobs made a split to sit two after his first, while China skip Xu Xiaoming flashed on his takeout attempt. Jacobs then drew for a third point, to take the early lead. After the second end was blanked, Canada continued the pressure in the third, forcing Xu to take a single by making a draw against four Canadian stones. China missed an in-off in the fifth, leading to a Jacobs hit for five to take a commanding 8–1 lead. Canada did not look back from there, finishing the game by winning 11–2.

With their semifinal wins, Scotland took on Switzerland in the gold medal final. In the first end, Switzerland was forced to a single to go up 1–0. After three blanked ends, Scotland took the lead scoring two in the fifth after Mouat made a double takeout. In the sixth, Scottish skip Bruce Mouat just missed a triple takeout on his first, which eventually resulted in a deuce for Switzerland, after Swiss fourth-thrower Benoît Schwarz-van Berkel took out a Scottish stone. With the Swiss now up 3–2, Mouat made tight angle tap in the seventh to score two and take the lead back, putting the score at 4–3. In the eighth end, Swiss third-thrower Yannick Schwaller missed a hit on his first, which eventually resulted in a force of one for the Swiss to tie the game when Schwarz-van Berkel drew for a single. Scotland blanked the ninth to give themselves the hammer in the final end. On his final shot, Mouat drew to the button for the championship, winning the game 5–4. The win was the second gold medal for Bruce Mouat and his team, and the seventh gold for Scotland.

Due to their final placements, Canada, the Czech Republic, Germany, Great Britain (represented by Scotland), Norway, Sweden and Switzerland all qualified for the Men's curling event at the 2026 Winter Olympics. Italy also qualified as the host country.

== Qualification ==
Thirteen curling federations qualified to participate in the 2025 World Men's Curling Championship. Of note, Austria qualified for the first time since 2002, while China returned for the first time since 2021.

| Means of Qualification | Vacancies | Qualified |
|---|---|---|
| Host Nation | 1 | Canada |
| 2024 Pan Continental Curling Championships | 4 | China; Japan; United States; South Korea |
| 2024 European Curling Championships | 8 | Germany; Scotland; Norway; Switzerland; Sweden; Italy; Austria; Czech Republic |
| TOTAL | 13 | |

== Teams ==
The teams are as follows:

| Austria | Canada | China | Czech Republic | Germany |
|---|---|---|---|---|
| Kitzbühel CC, Kitzbühel Skip: Mathias Genner; Third: Jonas Backofen; Second: Martin Reichel; Lead: Florian Mavec; Alternate: Matthäus Hofer | The Glencoe Club, Calgary Skip: Brad Jacobs; Third: Marc Kennedy; Second: Brett Gallant; Lead: Ben Hebert; Alternate: Tyler Tardi | CSO Curling Club, Beijing Skip: Xu Xiaoming; Third: Fei Xueqing; Second: Wang Zhiyu; Lead: Li Zhichao; Alternate: Yang Bohao | CC Zbraslav & CC Dion, Prague Skip: Lukáš Klíma; Third: Marek Černovský; Second: Martin Jurík; Lead: Lukáš Klípa; Alternate: Radek Boháč | CC Füssen, Füssen Skip: Marc Muskatewitz; Third: Benjamin Kapp; Second: Felix Messenzehl; Lead: Johannes Scheuerl; Alternate: Mario Trevisiol |
| Italy | Japan | Norway | Scotland | South Korea |
| Trentino CC & Curling Cembra, Cembra Skip: Joël Retornaz; Third: Amos Mosaner; Second: Sebastiano Arman; Lead: Mattia Giovanella; Alternate: Giacomo Colli | SC Karuizawa Club, Karuizawa Fourth: Riku Yanagisawa; Skip: Tsuyoshi Yamaguchi; Second: Takeru Yamamoto; Lead: Satoshi Koizumi; Alternate: Shingo Usui | Trondheim CK, Trondheim Skip: Magnus Ramsfjell; Third: Martin Sesaker; Second: Bendik Ramsfjell; Lead: Gaute Nepstad; Alternate: Willhelm Næss | Curl Edinburgh, Edinburgh Skip: Bruce Mouat; Third: Grant Hardie; Second: Bobby Lammie; Lead: Hammy McMillan Jr. Alternate: Kyle Waddell | Uiseong CC, Uiseong Skip: Kim Hyo-jun; Third: Kim Eun-bin; Second: Pyo Jeong-min; Lead: Kim Jin-hun; Alternate: Kim Chang-min |
| Sweden | Switzerland | United States | | |
| Karlstads CK, Karlstad Skip: Niklas Edin; Third: Oskar Eriksson; Second: Rasmus Wranå; Lead: Christoffer Sundgren; Alternate: Simon Olofsson | CC Genève, Geneva Fourth: Benoît Schwarz-van Berkel; Skip: Yannick Schwaller; Second: Sven Michel; Lead: Pablo Lachat-Couchepin; Alternate: Kim Schwaller | Duluth CC, Duluth Skip: Korey Dropkin; Third: Thomas Howell; Second: Andrew Stopera; Lead: Mark Fenner; Alternate: Chris Plys | | |

=== WCF ranking ===
Year-to-date World Curling Federation ranking for each team prior to the event.

| Nation (Skip) | Rank | Points |
|---|---|---|
| Scotland (Mouat) | 1 | 455.8 |
| Canada (Jacobs) | 3 | 338.4 |
| Switzerland (Schwaller) | 4 | 332.8 |
| Germany (Muskatewitz) | 8 | 270.8 |
| United States (Dropkin) | 11 | 212.5 |
| Italy (Retornaz) | 12 | 210.4 |
| Sweden (Edin) | 13 | 187.9 |
| Norway (Ramsfjell) | 14 | 177.8 |
| China (Xu) | 25 | 131.4 |
| Japan (Yamaguchi) | 28 | 124.7 |
| Czech Republic (Klíma) | 34 | 96.0 |
| South Korea (Kim) | 61 | 51.3 |
| Austria (Genner) | 111 | 18.2 |

== Round robin standings ==
Final Round Robin Standings

Key
| Teams to Playoffs |

| Country | Skip | W | L | W–L | PF | PA | EW | EL | BE | SE | S% | DSC |
|---|---|---|---|---|---|---|---|---|---|---|---|---|
| Canada | Brad Jacobs | 11 | 1 | – | 90 | 42 | 51 | 36 | 8 | 12 | 91.9% | 19.59 |
| Switzerland | Yannick Schwaller | 9 | 3 | – | 87 | 69 | 50 | 44 | 6 | 10 | 87.9% | 17.95 |
| China | Xu Xiaoming | 8 | 4 | 2–0 | 88 | 69 | 50 | 44 | 7 | 11 | 85.1% | 43.67 |
| Sweden | Niklas Edin | 8 | 4 | 1–1 | 82 | 64 | 52 | 41 | 5 | 12 | 89.3% | 12.27 |
| Scotland | Bruce Mouat | 8 | 4 | 0–2 | 82 | 72 | 44 | 42 | 8 | 8 | 87.9% | 16.58 |
| Norway | Magnus Ramsfjell | 7 | 5 | – | 82 | 69 | 51 | 45 | 7 | 13 | 87.0% | 20.92 |
| Czech Republic | Lukáš Klíma | 6 | 6 | – | 70 | 64 | 45 | 48 | 7 | 9 | 83.2% | 41.56 |
| Germany | Marc Muskatewitz | 5 | 7 | 1–1 | 80 | 73 | 43 | 43 | 8 | 10 | 84.8% | 20.75 |
| Japan | Tsuyoshi Yamaguchi | 5 | 7 | 1–1 | 71 | 93 | 46 | 50 | 9 | 3 | 82.1% | 27.70 |
| Italy | Joël Retornaz | 5 | 7 | 1–1 | 80 | 75 | 46 | 44 | 8 | 9 | 85.0% | 34.25 |
| United States | Korey Dropkin | 4 | 8 | – | 66 | 80 | 45 | 46 | 9 | 9 | 83.3% | 19.70 |
| Austria | Mathias Genner | 1 | 11 | 1–0 | 47 | 97 | 33 | 52 | 3 | 4 | 76.5% | 55.34 |
| South Korea | Kim Hyo-jun | 1 | 11 | 0–1 | 42 | 100 | 32 | 53 | 6 | 2 | 77.5% | 39.26 |

Round Robin Summary Table
| Pos. | Country | Austria | Canada | China | Czech Republic | Germany | Italy | Japan | Norway | Scotland | South Korea | Sweden | Switzerland | United States | Record |
|---|---|---|---|---|---|---|---|---|---|---|---|---|---|---|---|
| 12 | Austria | — | 2–8 | 7–8 | 2–7 | 3–9 | 2–8 | 7–9 | 2–8 | 2–12 | 11–4 | 4–8 | 4–9 | 1–7 | 1–11 |
| 1 | Canada | 8–2 | — | 8–2 | 8–3 | 7–5 | 4–2 | 7–3 | 8–3 | 5–6 | 9–3 | 8–6 | 10–4 | 8–3 | 11–1 |
| 3 | China | 8–7 | 2–8 | — | 3–10 | 11–10 | 9–4 | 6–7 | 8–6 | 9–2 | 10–1 | 9–5 | 5–7 | 8–2 | 8–4 |
| 7 | Czech Republic | 7–2 | 3–8 | 10–3 | — | 8–7 | 5–7 | 4–6 | 3–7 | 8–2 | 6–5 | 4–5 | 5–6 | 7–6 | 6–6 |
| 8 | Germany | 9–3 | 5–7 | 10–11 | 7–8 | — | 3–9 | 11–3 | 3–8 | 1–6 | 11–2 | 8–5 | 3–7 | 9–4 | 5–7 |
| 10 | Italy | 8–2 | 2–4 | 4–9 | 7–5 | 9–3 | — | 7–9 | 8–9 | 7–9 | 9–2 | 10–8 | 3–8 | 6–7 | 5–7 |
| 9 | Japan | 9–7 | 3–7 | 7–6 | 6–4 | 3–11 | 9–7 | — | 5–11 | 6–9 | 7–4 | 5–10 | 5–8 | 6–9 | 5–7 |
| 6 | Norway | 8–2 | 3–8 | 6–8 | 7–3 | 8–3 | 9–8 | 11–5 | — | 4–8 | 10–5 | 4–6 | 4–7 | 8–6 | 7–5 |
| 5 | Scotland | 12–2 | 6–5 | 2–9 | 2–8 | 6–1 | 9–7 | 9–6 | 8–4 | — | 9–3 | 4–10 | 7–11 | 8–6 | 8–4 |
| 13 | South Korea | 4–11 | 3–9 | 1–10 | 5–6 | 2–11 | 2–9 | 4–7 | 5–10 | 3–9 | — | 3–6 | 5–9 | 5–3 | 1–11 |
| 4 | Sweden | 8–4 | 6–8 | 5–9 | 5–4 | 5–8 | 8–10 | 10–5 | 6–4 | 10–4 | 6–3 | — | 6–4 | 7–1 | 8–4 |
| 2 | Switzerland | 9–4 | 4–10 | 7–5 | 6–5 | 7–3 | 8–3 | 8–5 | 7–4 | 11–7 | 9–5 | 4–6 | — | 7–12 | 9–3 |
| 11 | United States | 7–1 | 3–8 | 2–8 | 6–7 | 4–9 | 7–6 | 9–6 | 6–8 | 6–8 | 3–5 | 1–7 | 12–7 | — | 4–8 |

== Round robin results ==
All draw times are listed in Central Standard Time (UTC−06:00).

=== Draw 1 ===
Saturday, March 29, 2:00 pm

| Sheet A | 1 | 2 | 3 | 4 | 5 | 6 | 7 | 8 | 9 | 10 | Final |
|---|---|---|---|---|---|---|---|---|---|---|---|
| South Korea (Kim) | 0 | 1 | 0 | 1 | 1 | 0 | 1 | 0 | 0 | 1 | 5 |
| Czech Republic (Klíma) | 1 | 0 | 1 | 0 | 0 | 2 | 0 | 2 | 0 | 0 | 6 |

| Sheet B | 1 | 2 | 3 | 4 | 5 | 6 | 7 | 8 | 9 | 10 | Final |
|---|---|---|---|---|---|---|---|---|---|---|---|
| Japan (Yamaguchi) | 0 | 0 | 0 | 0 | 1 | 0 | 1 | 0 | 1 | X | 3 |
| Canada (Jacobs) | 0 | 0 | 0 | 2 | 0 | 3 | 0 | 2 | 0 | X | 7 |

| Sheet C | 1 | 2 | 3 | 4 | 5 | 6 | 7 | 8 | 9 | 10 | Final |
|---|---|---|---|---|---|---|---|---|---|---|---|
| Switzerland (Schwaller) | 0 | 2 | 0 | 2 | 0 | 2 | 0 | 0 | 1 | X | 7 |
| Norway (Ramsfjell) | 1 | 0 | 1 | 0 | 1 | 0 | 0 | 1 | 0 | X | 4 |

| Sheet D | 1 | 2 | 3 | 4 | 5 | 6 | 7 | 8 | 9 | 10 | Final |
|---|---|---|---|---|---|---|---|---|---|---|---|
| United States (Dropkin) | 0 | 2 | 0 | 1 | 1 | 0 | 0 | 2 | 0 | 1 | 7 |
| Italy (Retornaz) | 1 | 0 | 1 | 0 | 0 | 2 | 1 | 0 | 1 | 0 | 6 |

=== Draw 2 ===
Saturday, March 29, 7:00 pm

| Sheet A | 1 | 2 | 3 | 4 | 5 | 6 | 7 | 8 | 9 | 10 | Final |
|---|---|---|---|---|---|---|---|---|---|---|---|
| Sweden (Edin) | 1 | 0 | 0 | 1 | 0 | 3 | 0 | 0 | 0 | 0 | 5 |
| China (Xu) | 0 | 1 | 0 | 0 | 2 | 0 | 0 | 2 | 1 | 3 | 9 |

| Sheet B | 1 | 2 | 3 | 4 | 5 | 6 | 7 | 8 | 9 | 10 | Final |
|---|---|---|---|---|---|---|---|---|---|---|---|
| South Korea (Kim) | 0 | 1 | 0 | 1 | 0 | 0 | X | X | X | X | 2 |
| Italy (Retornaz) | 3 | 0 | 2 | 0 | 2 | 2 | X | X | X | X | 9 |

| Sheet C | 1 | 2 | 3 | 4 | 5 | 6 | 7 | 8 | 9 | 10 | Final |
|---|---|---|---|---|---|---|---|---|---|---|---|
| Austria (Genner) | 0 | 0 | 1 | 0 | 1 | 0 | X | X | X | X | 2 |
| Scotland (Mouat) | 5 | 0 | 0 | 5 | 0 | 2 | X | X | X | X | 12 |

| Sheet D | 1 | 2 | 3 | 4 | 5 | 6 | 7 | 8 | 9 | 10 | Final |
|---|---|---|---|---|---|---|---|---|---|---|---|
| Germany (Muskatewitz) | 0 | 1 | 0 | 0 | 1 | 0 | 0 | 0 | 3 | 0 | 5 |
| Canada (Jacobs) | 1 | 0 | 0 | 2 | 0 | 2 | 1 | 0 | 0 | 1 | 7 |

=== Draw 3 ===
Sunday, March 30, 9:00 am

| Sheet A | 1 | 2 | 3 | 4 | 5 | 6 | 7 | 8 | 9 | 10 | Final |
|---|---|---|---|---|---|---|---|---|---|---|---|
| Scotland (Mouat) | 0 | 4 | 0 | 2 | 0 | 1 | 1 | 1 | 0 | X | 9 |
| Japan (Yamaguchi) | 1 | 0 | 4 | 0 | 0 | 0 | 0 | 0 | 1 | X | 6 |

| Sheet B | 1 | 2 | 3 | 4 | 5 | 6 | 7 | 8 | 9 | 10 | Final |
|---|---|---|---|---|---|---|---|---|---|---|---|
| China (Xu) | 0 | 2 | 0 | 1 | 0 | 1 | 0 | 4 | X | X | 8 |
| United States (Dropkin) | 0 | 0 | 1 | 0 | 0 | 0 | 1 | 0 | X | X | 2 |

| Sheet C | 1 | 2 | 3 | 4 | 5 | 6 | 7 | 8 | 9 | 10 | Final |
|---|---|---|---|---|---|---|---|---|---|---|---|
| Czech Republic (Klíma) | 0 | 0 | 2 | 0 | 2 | 0 | 3 | 0 | 0 | 1 | 8 |
| Germany (Muskatewitz) | 0 | 1 | 0 | 1 | 0 | 1 | 0 | 3 | 1 | 0 | 7 |

| Sheet D | 1 | 2 | 3 | 4 | 5 | 6 | 7 | 8 | 9 | 10 | Final |
|---|---|---|---|---|---|---|---|---|---|---|---|
| Austria (Genner) | 0 | 1 | 0 | 1 | 0 | 0 | 0 | 2 | 0 | X | 4 |
| Switzerland (Schwaller) | 2 | 0 | 2 | 0 | 2 | 0 | 0 | 0 | 3 | X | 9 |

=== Draw 4 ===
Sunday, March 30, 2:00 pm

| Sheet A | 1 | 2 | 3 | 4 | 5 | 6 | 7 | 8 | 9 | 10 | Final |
|---|---|---|---|---|---|---|---|---|---|---|---|
| United States (Dropkin) | 2 | 1 | 0 | 4 | 0 | 3 | 0 | 2 | X | X | 12 |
| Switzerland (Schwaller) | 0 | 0 | 2 | 0 | 3 | 0 | 2 | 0 | X | X | 7 |

| Sheet B | 1 | 2 | 3 | 4 | 5 | 6 | 7 | 8 | 9 | 10 | Final |
|---|---|---|---|---|---|---|---|---|---|---|---|
| Norway (Ramsfjell) | 1 | 0 | 0 | 2 | 1 | 0 | 1 | 2 | 0 | X | 7 |
| Czech Republic (Klíma) | 0 | 1 | 0 | 0 | 0 | 1 | 0 | 0 | 1 | X | 3 |

| Sheet C | 1 | 2 | 3 | 4 | 5 | 6 | 7 | 8 | 9 | 10 | Final |
|---|---|---|---|---|---|---|---|---|---|---|---|
| Canada (Jacobs) | 3 | 0 | 2 | 0 | 2 | 0 | 0 | 2 | X | X | 9 |
| South Korea (Kim) | 0 | 1 | 0 | 1 | 0 | 1 | 0 | 0 | X | X | 3 |

| Sheet D | 1 | 2 | 3 | 4 | 5 | 6 | 7 | 8 | 9 | 10 | Final |
|---|---|---|---|---|---|---|---|---|---|---|---|
| Japan (Yamaguchi) | 0 | 1 | 0 | 2 | 0 | 0 | 1 | 0 | 1 | X | 5 |
| Sweden (Edin) | 1 | 0 | 3 | 0 | 2 | 1 | 0 | 3 | 0 | X | 10 |

=== Draw 5 ===
Sunday, March 30, 7:00 pm

| Sheet A | 1 | 2 | 3 | 4 | 5 | 6 | 7 | 8 | 9 | 10 | Final |
|---|---|---|---|---|---|---|---|---|---|---|---|
| Germany (Muskatewitz) | 0 | 2 | 0 | 0 | 1 | 0 | 0 | X | X | X | 3 |
| Norway (Ramsfjell) | 0 | 0 | 3 | 2 | 0 | 2 | 1 | X | X | X | 8 |

| Sheet B | 1 | 2 | 3 | 4 | 5 | 6 | 7 | 8 | 9 | 10 | Final |
|---|---|---|---|---|---|---|---|---|---|---|---|
| Sweden (Edin) | 1 | 0 | 0 | 1 | 1 | 0 | 2 | 0 | 3 | X | 8 |
| Austria (Genner) | 0 | 1 | 1 | 0 | 0 | 1 | 0 | 1 | 0 | X | 4 |

| Sheet C | 1 | 2 | 3 | 4 | 5 | 6 | 7 | 8 | 9 | 10 | Final |
|---|---|---|---|---|---|---|---|---|---|---|---|
| Italy (Retornaz) | 1 | 0 | 1 | 0 | 0 | 1 | 0 | 1 | 0 | X | 4 |
| China (Xu) | 0 | 3 | 0 | 0 | 2 | 0 | 1 | 0 | 3 | X | 9 |

| Sheet D | 1 | 2 | 3 | 4 | 5 | 6 | 7 | 8 | 9 | 10 | Final |
|---|---|---|---|---|---|---|---|---|---|---|---|
| Scotland (Mouat) | 2 | 0 | 2 | 1 | 0 | 0 | 1 | 0 | 3 | X | 9 |
| South Korea (Kim) | 0 | 1 | 0 | 0 | 1 | 0 | 0 | 1 | 0 | X | 3 |

=== Draw 6 ===
Monday, March 31, 9:00 am

| Sheet A | 1 | 2 | 3 | 4 | 5 | 6 | 7 | 8 | 9 | 10 | Final |
|---|---|---|---|---|---|---|---|---|---|---|---|
| Czech Republic (Klíma) | 0 | 2 | 0 | 0 | 0 | 0 | 2 | 0 | 1 | 0 | 5 |
| Italy (Retornaz) | 3 | 0 | 2 | 1 | 0 | 0 | 0 | 0 | 0 | 1 | 7 |

| Sheet B | 1 | 2 | 3 | 4 | 5 | 6 | 7 | 8 | 9 | 10 | Final |
|---|---|---|---|---|---|---|---|---|---|---|---|
| Switzerland (Schwaller) | 0 | 0 | 2 | 1 | 1 | 0 | 0 | 3 | 0 | 1 | 8 |
| Japan (Yamaguchi) | 0 | 2 | 0 | 0 | 0 | 0 | 2 | 0 | 1 | 0 | 5 |

| Sheet C | 1 | 2 | 3 | 4 | 5 | 6 | 7 | 8 | 9 | 10 | Final |
|---|---|---|---|---|---|---|---|---|---|---|---|
| Germany (Muskatewitz) | 2 | 2 | 0 | 3 | 2 | 0 | X | X | X | X | 9 |
| Austria (Genner) | 0 | 0 | 2 | 0 | 0 | 1 | X | X | X | X | 3 |

=== Draw 7 ===
Monday, March 31, 2:00 pm

| Sheet A | 1 | 2 | 3 | 4 | 5 | 6 | 7 | 8 | 9 | 10 | Final |
|---|---|---|---|---|---|---|---|---|---|---|---|
| Switzerland (Schwaller) | 1 | 0 | 2 | 0 | 1 | 0 | 2 | 0 | 1 | 0 | 7 |
| China (Xu) | 0 | 1 | 0 | 0 | 0 | 1 | 0 | 2 | 0 | 1 | 5 |

| Sheet B | 1 | 2 | 3 | 4 | 5 | 6 | 7 | 8 | 9 | 10 | 11 | Final |
|---|---|---|---|---|---|---|---|---|---|---|---|---|
| Canada (Jacobs) | 1 | 0 | 2 | 0 | 0 | 0 | 0 | 0 | 0 | 2 | 0 | 5 |
| Scotland (Mouat) | 0 | 3 | 0 | 0 | 0 | 0 | 0 | 1 | 1 | 0 | 1 | 6 |

| Sheet C | 1 | 2 | 3 | 4 | 5 | 6 | 7 | 8 | 9 | 10 | Final |
|---|---|---|---|---|---|---|---|---|---|---|---|
| South Korea (Kim) | 0 | 1 | 0 | 0 | 0 | 0 | 0 | 2 | 0 | X | 3 |
| Sweden (Edin) | 1 | 0 | 0 | 1 | 1 | 1 | 0 | 0 | 2 | X | 6 |

| Sheet D | 1 | 2 | 3 | 4 | 5 | 6 | 7 | 8 | 9 | 10 | Final |
|---|---|---|---|---|---|---|---|---|---|---|---|
| Norway (Ramsfjell) | 0 | 0 | 1 | 0 | 4 | 0 | 0 | 1 | 0 | 2 | 8 |
| United States (Dropkin) | 0 | 2 | 0 | 2 | 0 | 1 | 0 | 0 | 1 | 0 | 6 |

=== Draw 8 ===
Monday, March 31, 7:00 pm

| Sheet A | 1 | 2 | 3 | 4 | 5 | 6 | 7 | 8 | 9 | 10 | Final |
|---|---|---|---|---|---|---|---|---|---|---|---|
| Austria (Genner) | 0 | 1 | 0 | 0 | 3 | 0 | 2 | 0 | 1 | 0 | 7 |
| Japan (Yamaguchi) | 1 | 0 | 2 | 2 | 0 | 2 | 0 | 1 | 0 | 1 | 9 |

| Sheet B | 1 | 2 | 3 | 4 | 5 | 6 | 7 | 8 | 9 | 10 | Final |
|---|---|---|---|---|---|---|---|---|---|---|---|
| Italy (Retornaz) | 1 | 0 | 1 | 0 | 0 | 3 | 0 | 1 | 0 | 2 | 8 |
| Norway (Ramsfjell) | 0 | 3 | 0 | 3 | 1 | 0 | 1 | 0 | 1 | 0 | 9 |

| Sheet C | 1 | 2 | 3 | 4 | 5 | 6 | 7 | 8 | 9 | 10 | Final |
|---|---|---|---|---|---|---|---|---|---|---|---|
| Scotland (Mouat) | 0 | 1 | 0 | 0 | 0 | 1 | 0 | X | X | X | 2 |
| Czech Republic (Klíma) | 0 | 0 | 2 | 1 | 2 | 0 | 3 | X | X | X | 8 |

| Sheet D | 1 | 2 | 3 | 4 | 5 | 6 | 7 | 8 | 9 | 10 | Final |
|---|---|---|---|---|---|---|---|---|---|---|---|
| China (Xu) | 0 | 1 | 0 | 1 | 0 | 4 | 0 | 4 | 0 | 1 | 11 |
| Germany (Muskatewitz) | 2 | 0 | 1 | 0 | 4 | 0 | 2 | 0 | 1 | 0 | 10 |

=== Draw 9 ===
Tuesday, April 1, 9:00 am

| Sheet B | 1 | 2 | 3 | 4 | 5 | 6 | 7 | 8 | 9 | 10 | Final |
|---|---|---|---|---|---|---|---|---|---|---|---|
| Japan (Yamaguchi) | 0 | 1 | 0 | 0 | 1 | 0 | 0 | 3 | 0 | 1 | 6 |
| Czech Republic (Klíma) | 0 | 0 | 0 | 2 | 0 | 1 | 0 | 0 | 1 | 0 | 4 |

| Sheet C | 1 | 2 | 3 | 4 | 5 | 6 | 7 | 8 | 9 | 10 | Final |
|---|---|---|---|---|---|---|---|---|---|---|---|
| United States (Dropkin) | 2 | 1 | 0 | 0 | 0 | 3 | 1 | X | X | X | 7 |
| Austria (Genner) | 0 | 0 | 1 | 0 | 0 | 0 | 0 | X | X | X | 1 |

| Sheet D | 1 | 2 | 3 | 4 | 5 | 6 | 7 | 8 | 9 | 10 | Final |
|---|---|---|---|---|---|---|---|---|---|---|---|
| Sweden (Edin) | 1 | 0 | 1 | 0 | 1 | 0 | 1 | 0 | 2 | 0 | 6 |
| Canada (Jacobs) | 0 | 2 | 0 | 3 | 0 | 1 | 0 | 1 | 0 | 1 | 8 |

=== Draw 10 ===
Tuesday, April 1, 2:00 pm

| Sheet A | 1 | 2 | 3 | 4 | 5 | 6 | 7 | 8 | 9 | 10 | Final |
|---|---|---|---|---|---|---|---|---|---|---|---|
| China (Xu) | 0 | 3 | 0 | 2 | 0 | 1 | 0 | 1 | 0 | 1 | 8 |
| Norway (Ramsfjell) | 0 | 0 | 1 | 0 | 1 | 0 | 2 | 0 | 2 | 0 | 6 |

| Sheet B | 1 | 2 | 3 | 4 | 5 | 6 | 7 | 8 | 9 | 10 | Final |
|---|---|---|---|---|---|---|---|---|---|---|---|
| Germany (Muskatewitz) | 2 | 2 | 0 | 4 | 0 | 3 | X | X | X | X | 11 |
| South Korea (Kim) | 0 | 0 | 1 | 0 | 1 | 0 | X | X | X | X | 2 |

| Sheet C | 1 | 2 | 3 | 4 | 5 | 6 | 7 | 8 | 9 | 10 | Final |
|---|---|---|---|---|---|---|---|---|---|---|---|
| Sweden (Edin) | 0 | 0 | 1 | 1 | 0 | 2 | 1 | 0 | 0 | 1 | 6 |
| Switzerland (Schwaller) | 0 | 2 | 0 | 0 | 1 | 0 | 0 | 0 | 1 | 0 | 4 |

| Sheet D | 1 | 2 | 3 | 4 | 5 | 6 | 7 | 8 | 9 | 10 | Final |
|---|---|---|---|---|---|---|---|---|---|---|---|
| Italy (Retornaz) | 0 | 0 | 2 | 0 | 2 | 0 | 0 | 2 | 0 | 1 | 7 |
| Scotland (Mouat) | 0 | 2 | 0 | 1 | 0 | 2 | 0 | 0 | 4 | 0 | 9 |

=== Draw 11 ===
Tuesday, April 1, 7:00 pm

| Sheet A | 1 | 2 | 3 | 4 | 5 | 6 | 7 | 8 | 9 | 10 | Final |
|---|---|---|---|---|---|---|---|---|---|---|---|
| Canada (Jacobs) | 1 | 0 | 0 | 2 | 0 | 0 | 1 | 0 | 0 | X | 4 |
| Italy (Retornaz) | 0 | 1 | 0 | 0 | 1 | 0 | 0 | 0 | 0 | X | 2 |

| Sheet B | 1 | 2 | 3 | 4 | 5 | 6 | 7 | 8 | 9 | 10 | Final |
|---|---|---|---|---|---|---|---|---|---|---|---|
| Austria (Genner) | 0 | 0 | 0 | 2 | 0 | 1 | 0 | 3 | 0 | 1 | 7 |
| China (Xu) | 0 | 2 | 1 | 0 | 1 | 0 | 2 | 0 | 2 | 0 | 8 |

| Sheet C | 1 | 2 | 3 | 4 | 5 | 6 | 7 | 8 | 9 | 10 | Final |
|---|---|---|---|---|---|---|---|---|---|---|---|
| Japan (Yamaguchi) | 1 | 0 | 0 | 0 | 0 | 2 | X | X | X | X | 3 |
| Germany (Muskatewitz) | 0 | 2 | 2 | 3 | 4 | 0 | X | X | X | X | 11 |

| Sheet D | 1 | 2 | 3 | 4 | 5 | 6 | 7 | 8 | 9 | 10 | 11 | Final |
|---|---|---|---|---|---|---|---|---|---|---|---|---|
| Czech Republic (Klíma) | 0 | 0 | 3 | 0 | 1 | 0 | 1 | 1 | 0 | 0 | 1 | 7 |
| United States (Dropkin) | 0 | 1 | 0 | 2 | 0 | 1 | 0 | 0 | 1 | 1 | 0 | 6 |

=== Draw 12 ===
Wednesday, April 2, 9:00 am

| Sheet A | 1 | 2 | 3 | 4 | 5 | 6 | 7 | 8 | 9 | 10 | Final |
|---|---|---|---|---|---|---|---|---|---|---|---|
| Scotland (Mouat) | 1 | 0 | 0 | 2 | 0 | 2 | 0 | 2 | 0 | X | 7 |
| Switzerland (Schwaller) | 0 | 3 | 1 | 0 | 4 | 0 | 1 | 0 | 2 | X | 11 |

| Sheet B | 1 | 2 | 3 | 4 | 5 | 6 | 7 | 8 | 9 | 10 | Final |
|---|---|---|---|---|---|---|---|---|---|---|---|
| United States (Dropkin) | 0 | 0 | 0 | 0 | 1 | 0 | X | X | X | X | 1 |
| Sweden (Edin) | 3 | 1 | 0 | 1 | 0 | 2 | X | X | X | X | 7 |

| Sheet C | 1 | 2 | 3 | 4 | 5 | 6 | 7 | 8 | 9 | 10 | Final |
|---|---|---|---|---|---|---|---|---|---|---|---|
| Norway (Ramsfjell) | 1 | 0 | 1 | 0 | 1 | 0 | 0 | 0 | X | X | 3 |
| Canada (Jacobs) | 0 | 1 | 0 | 3 | 0 | 1 | 1 | 2 | X | X | 8 |

| Sheet D | 1 | 2 | 3 | 4 | 5 | 6 | 7 | 8 | 9 | 10 | Final |
|---|---|---|---|---|---|---|---|---|---|---|---|
| South Korea (Kim) | 0 | 0 | 1 | 0 | 1 | 0 | 0 | 2 | 0 | X | 4 |
| Japan (Yamaguchi) | 0 | 2 | 0 | 1 | 0 | 0 | 2 | 0 | 2 | X | 7 |

=== Draw 13 ===
Wednesday, April 2, 2:00 pm

| Sheet A | 1 | 2 | 3 | 4 | 5 | 6 | 7 | 8 | 9 | 10 | Final |
|---|---|---|---|---|---|---|---|---|---|---|---|
| Germany (Muskatewitz) | 0 | 0 | 1 | 0 | 2 | 1 | 0 | 3 | 0 | 1 | 8 |
| Sweden (Edin) | 0 | 1 | 0 | 2 | 0 | 0 | 1 | 0 | 1 | 0 | 5 |

| Sheet B | 1 | 2 | 3 | 4 | 5 | 6 | 7 | 8 | 9 | 10 | Final |
|---|---|---|---|---|---|---|---|---|---|---|---|
| Scotland (Mouat) | 1 | 0 | 1 | 1 | 0 | 1 | 1 | 0 | 0 | 3 | 8 |
| Norway (Ramsfjell) | 0 | 2 | 0 | 0 | 1 | 0 | 0 | 0 | 1 | 0 | 4 |

| Sheet C | 1 | 2 | 3 | 4 | 5 | 6 | 7 | 8 | 9 | 10 | Final |
|---|---|---|---|---|---|---|---|---|---|---|---|
| China (Xu) | 0 | 0 | 1 | 0 | 1 | 0 | 1 | 0 | 0 | X | 3 |
| Czech Republic (Klíma) | 0 | 2 | 0 | 1 | 0 | 2 | 0 | 2 | 3 | X | 10 |

| Sheet D | 1 | 2 | 3 | 4 | 5 | 6 | 7 | 8 | 9 | 10 | Final |
|---|---|---|---|---|---|---|---|---|---|---|---|
| Italy (Retornaz) | 1 | 0 | 0 | 0 | 2 | 2 | 0 | 3 | X | X | 8 |
| Austria (Genner) | 0 | 1 | 0 | 0 | 0 | 0 | 1 | 0 | X | X | 2 |

=== Draw 14 ===
Wednesday, April 2, 7:00 pm

| Sheet A | 1 | 2 | 3 | 4 | 5 | 6 | 7 | 8 | 9 | 10 | Final |
|---|---|---|---|---|---|---|---|---|---|---|---|
| Japan (Yamaguchi) | 0 | 1 | 0 | 0 | 0 | 2 | 0 | 3 | 0 | 0 | 6 |
| United States (Dropkin) | 0 | 0 | 3 | 1 | 1 | 0 | 2 | 0 | 1 | 1 | 9 |

| Sheet B | 1 | 2 | 3 | 4 | 5 | 6 | 7 | 8 | 9 | 10 | Final |
|---|---|---|---|---|---|---|---|---|---|---|---|
| Czech Republic (Klíma) | 0 | 1 | 0 | 1 | 0 | 0 | 1 | 0 | X | X | 3 |
| Canada (Jacobs) | 2 | 0 | 1 | 0 | 1 | 2 | 0 | 2 | X | X | 8 |

| Sheet C | 1 | 2 | 3 | 4 | 5 | 6 | 7 | 8 | 9 | 10 | Final |
|---|---|---|---|---|---|---|---|---|---|---|---|
| Austria (Genner) | 1 | 4 | 0 | 1 | 2 | 0 | 1 | 2 | X | X | 11 |
| South Korea (Kim) | 0 | 0 | 2 | 0 | 0 | 2 | 0 | 0 | X | X | 4 |

| Sheet D | 1 | 2 | 3 | 4 | 5 | 6 | 7 | 8 | 9 | 10 | Final |
|---|---|---|---|---|---|---|---|---|---|---|---|
| Switzerland (Schwaller) | 3 | 0 | 1 | 1 | 0 | 1 | 0 | 0 | 1 | X | 7 |
| Germany (Muskatewitz) | 0 | 1 | 0 | 0 | 1 | 0 | 1 | 0 | 0 | X | 3 |

=== Draw 15 ===
Thursday, April 3, 9:00 am

| Sheet A | 1 | 2 | 3 | 4 | 5 | 6 | 7 | 8 | 9 | 10 | Final |
|---|---|---|---|---|---|---|---|---|---|---|---|
| Norway (Ramsfjell) | 2 | 0 | 4 | 0 | 1 | 0 | 0 | 2 | 1 | X | 10 |
| South Korea (Kim) | 0 | 1 | 0 | 2 | 0 | 2 | 0 | 0 | 0 | X | 5 |

| Sheet B | 1 | 2 | 3 | 4 | 5 | 6 | 7 | 8 | 9 | 10 | Final |
|---|---|---|---|---|---|---|---|---|---|---|---|
| Italy (Retornaz) | 0 | 0 | 0 | 1 | 0 | 2 | X | X | X | X | 3 |
| Switzerland (Schwaller) | 2 | 2 | 3 | 0 | 1 | 0 | X | X | X | X | 8 |

| Sheet C | 1 | 2 | 3 | 4 | 5 | 6 | 7 | 8 | 9 | 10 | Final |
|---|---|---|---|---|---|---|---|---|---|---|---|
| Sweden (Edin) | 1 | 0 | 4 | 2 | 0 | 3 | X | X | X | X | 10 |
| Scotland (Mouat) | 0 | 2 | 0 | 0 | 2 | 0 | X | X | X | X | 4 |

| Sheet D | 1 | 2 | 3 | 4 | 5 | 6 | 7 | 8 | 9 | 10 | Final |
|---|---|---|---|---|---|---|---|---|---|---|---|
| Canada (Jacobs) | 2 | 0 | 2 | 0 | 1 | 2 | 1 | X | X | X | 8 |
| China (Xu) | 0 | 1 | 0 | 1 | 0 | 0 | 0 | X | X | X | 2 |

=== Draw 16 ===
Thursday, April 3, 2:00 pm

| Sheet A | 1 | 2 | 3 | 4 | 5 | 6 | 7 | 8 | 9 | 10 | Final |
|---|---|---|---|---|---|---|---|---|---|---|---|
| Czech Republic (Klíma) | 1 | 0 | 1 | 1 | 4 | 0 | X | X | X | X | 7 |
| Austria (Genner) | 0 | 1 | 0 | 0 | 0 | 1 | X | X | X | X | 2 |

| Sheet B | 1 | 2 | 3 | 4 | 5 | 6 | 7 | 8 | 9 | 10 | Final |
|---|---|---|---|---|---|---|---|---|---|---|---|
| China (Xu) | 0 | 0 | 1 | 0 | 0 | 0 | 2 | 0 | 3 | 0 | 6 |
| Japan (Yamaguchi) | 0 | 1 | 0 | 2 | 0 | 1 | 0 | 2 | 0 | 1 | 7 |

| Sheet C | 1 | 2 | 3 | 4 | 5 | 6 | 7 | 8 | 9 | 10 | Final |
|---|---|---|---|---|---|---|---|---|---|---|---|
| Germany (Muskatewitz) | 1 | 0 | 0 | 0 | 2 | 0 | 0 | X | X | X | 3 |
| Italy (Retornaz) | 0 | 1 | 3 | 1 | 0 | 0 | 4 | X | X | X | 9 |

| Sheet D | 1 | 2 | 3 | 4 | 5 | 6 | 7 | 8 | 9 | 10 | Final |
|---|---|---|---|---|---|---|---|---|---|---|---|
| United States (Dropkin) | 0 | 2 | 0 | 2 | 0 | 1 | 0 | 0 | 1 | 0 | 6 |
| Scotland (Mouat) | 2 | 0 | 1 | 0 | 1 | 0 | 0 | 3 | 0 | 1 | 8 |

=== Draw 17 ===
Thursday, April 3, 7:00 pm

| Sheet A | 1 | 2 | 3 | 4 | 5 | 6 | 7 | 8 | 9 | 10 | Final |
|---|---|---|---|---|---|---|---|---|---|---|---|
| Switzerland (Schwaller) | 0 | 1 | 0 | 1 | 0 | 0 | 2 | 0 | X | X | 4 |
| Canada (Jacobs) | 0 | 0 | 2 | 0 | 3 | 1 | 0 | 4 | X | X | 10 |

| Sheet B | 1 | 2 | 3 | 4 | 5 | 6 | 7 | 8 | 9 | 10 | Final |
|---|---|---|---|---|---|---|---|---|---|---|---|
| South Korea (Kim) | 0 | 0 | 2 | 0 | 0 | 0 | 0 | 0 | 2 | 1 | 5 |
| United States (Dropkin) | 0 | 1 | 0 | 1 | 0 | 1 | 0 | 0 | 0 | 0 | 3 |

| Sheet C | 1 | 2 | 3 | 4 | 5 | 6 | 7 | 8 | 9 | 10 | Final |
|---|---|---|---|---|---|---|---|---|---|---|---|
| Norway (Ramsfjell) | 0 | 2 | 0 | 2 | 0 | 4 | 1 | 2 | X | X | 11 |
| Japan (Yamaguchi) | 1 | 0 | 1 | 0 | 3 | 0 | 0 | 0 | X | X | 5 |

| Sheet D | 1 | 2 | 3 | 4 | 5 | 6 | 7 | 8 | 9 | 10 | Final |
|---|---|---|---|---|---|---|---|---|---|---|---|
| Sweden (Edin) | 0 | 2 | 0 | 0 | 1 | 0 | 1 | 0 | 0 | 1 | 5 |
| Czech Republic (Klíma) | 0 | 0 | 0 | 1 | 0 | 1 | 0 | 0 | 2 | 0 | 4 |

=== Draw 18 ===
Friday, April 4, 9:00 am

| Sheet A | 1 | 2 | 3 | 4 | 5 | 6 | 7 | 8 | 9 | 10 | Final |
|---|---|---|---|---|---|---|---|---|---|---|---|
| Italy (Retornaz) | 0 | 0 | 2 | 0 | 2 | 0 | 0 | 3 | 0 | 3 | 10 |
| Sweden (Edin) | 0 | 2 | 0 | 1 | 0 | 0 | 2 | 0 | 3 | 0 | 8 |

| Sheet B | 1 | 2 | 3 | 4 | 5 | 6 | 7 | 8 | 9 | 10 | Final |
|---|---|---|---|---|---|---|---|---|---|---|---|
| Scotland (Mouat) | 3 | 0 | 0 | 1 | 0 | 0 | 2 | X | X | X | 6 |
| Germany (Muskatewitz) | 0 | 0 | 0 | 0 | 0 | 1 | 0 | X | X | X | 1 |

| Sheet C | 1 | 2 | 3 | 4 | 5 | 6 | 7 | 8 | 9 | 10 | Final |
|---|---|---|---|---|---|---|---|---|---|---|---|
| South Korea (Kim) | 0 | 1 | 0 | 0 | 0 | 0 | X | X | X | X | 1 |
| China (Xu) | 2 | 0 | 2 | 3 | 3 | 0 | X | X | X | X | 10 |

| Sheet D | 1 | 2 | 3 | 4 | 5 | 6 | 7 | 8 | 9 | 10 | Final |
|---|---|---|---|---|---|---|---|---|---|---|---|
| Austria (Genner) | 0 | 0 | 2 | 0 | 0 | 0 | 0 | X | X | X | 2 |
| Norway (Ramsfjell) | 1 | 1 | 0 | 1 | 1 | 1 | 3 | X | X | X | 8 |

=== Draw 19 ===
Friday, April 4, 2:00 pm

| Sheet A | 1 | 2 | 3 | 4 | 5 | 6 | 7 | 8 | 9 | 10 | Final |
|---|---|---|---|---|---|---|---|---|---|---|---|
| United States (Dropkin) | 0 | 0 | 1 | 0 | 2 | 0 | 0 | 1 | 0 | X | 4 |
| Germany (Muskatewitz) | 0 | 2 | 0 | 2 | 0 | 2 | 1 | 0 | 2 | X | 9 |

| Sheet B | 1 | 2 | 3 | 4 | 5 | 6 | 7 | 8 | 9 | 10 | Final |
|---|---|---|---|---|---|---|---|---|---|---|---|
| Canada (Jacobs) | 2 | 1 | 1 | 0 | 1 | 0 | 3 | X | X | X | 8 |
| Austria (Genner) | 0 | 0 | 0 | 1 | 0 | 1 | 0 | X | X | X | 2 |

| Sheet C | 1 | 2 | 3 | 4 | 5 | 6 | 7 | 8 | 9 | 10 | Final |
|---|---|---|---|---|---|---|---|---|---|---|---|
| Czech Republic (Klíma) | 1 | 0 | 0 | 2 | 0 | 0 | 1 | 1 | 0 | 0 | 5 |
| Switzerland (Schwaller) | 0 | 2 | 0 | 0 | 1 | 1 | 0 | 0 | 0 | 2 | 6 |

| Sheet D | 1 | 2 | 3 | 4 | 5 | 6 | 7 | 8 | 9 | 10 | 11 | Final |
|---|---|---|---|---|---|---|---|---|---|---|---|---|
| Japan (Yamaguchi) | 2 | 0 | 1 | 0 | 2 | 1 | 0 | 0 | 1 | 0 | 2 | 9 |
| Italy (Retornaz) | 0 | 2 | 0 | 2 | 0 | 0 | 0 | 2 | 0 | 1 | 0 | 7 |

=== Draw 20 ===
Friday, April 4, 7:00 pm

| Sheet A | 1 | 2 | 3 | 4 | 5 | 6 | 7 | 8 | 9 | 10 | Final |
|---|---|---|---|---|---|---|---|---|---|---|---|
| China (Xu) | 0 | 1 | 1 | 0 | 2 | 1 | 1 | 3 | X | X | 9 |
| Scotland (Mouat) | 0 | 0 | 0 | 2 | 0 | 0 | 0 | 0 | X | X | 2 |

| Sheet B | 1 | 2 | 3 | 4 | 5 | 6 | 7 | 8 | 9 | 10 | Final |
|---|---|---|---|---|---|---|---|---|---|---|---|
| Norway (Ramsfjell) | 0 | 0 | 0 | 0 | 1 | 0 | 1 | 0 | 2 | X | 4 |
| Sweden (Edin) | 1 | 0 | 0 | 1 | 0 | 2 | 0 | 2 | 0 | X | 6 |

| Sheet C | 1 | 2 | 3 | 4 | 5 | 6 | 7 | 8 | 9 | 10 | Final |
|---|---|---|---|---|---|---|---|---|---|---|---|
| Canada (Jacobs) | 0 | 0 | 2 | 1 | 0 | 2 | 0 | 0 | 3 | X | 8 |
| United States (Dropkin) | 0 | 1 | 0 | 0 | 1 | 0 | 1 | 0 | 0 | X | 3 |

| Sheet D | 1 | 2 | 3 | 4 | 5 | 6 | 7 | 8 | 9 | 10 | Final |
|---|---|---|---|---|---|---|---|---|---|---|---|
| Switzerland (Schwaller) | 2 | 0 | 0 | 2 | 1 | 0 | 2 | 0 | 2 | X | 9 |
| South Korea (Kim) | 0 | 1 | 0 | 0 | 0 | 2 | 0 | 2 | 0 | X | 5 |

== Playoffs ==
Qualification games
4 | Sweden | 7
5 | Scotland | 8
3 | China | 8
6 | Norway | 7

Semifinals
1 | Canada | 4
5 | Scotland | 7
2 | Switzerland | 7
3 | China | 3

Final
5 | Scotland | 5
2 | Switzerland | 4
Bronze medal game
1 | Canada | 11
3 | China | 2

=== Qualification Games ===
Saturday, April 5, 9:00 am

| Sheet B | 1 | 2 | 3 | 4 | 5 | 6 | 7 | 8 | 9 | 10 | 11 | Final |
|---|---|---|---|---|---|---|---|---|---|---|---|---|
| China (Xu) | 1 | 1 | 0 | 1 | 0 | 3 | 0 | 1 | 0 | 0 | 1 | 8 |
| Norway (Ramsfjell) | 0 | 0 | 0 | 0 | 2 | 0 | 3 | 0 | 1 | 1 | 0 | 7 |

Player percentages
| China | | Norway | |
|---|---|---|---|
| Li Zhichao | 85% | Gaute Nepstad | 97% |
| Wang Zhiyu | 81% | Bendik Ramsfjell | 92% |
| Fei Xueqing | 80% | Martin Sesaker | 83% |
| Xu Xiaoming | 75% | Magnus Ramsfjell | 83% |
| Total | 80% | Total | 89% |

| Sheet D | 1 | 2 | 3 | 4 | 5 | 6 | 7 | 8 | 9 | 10 | Final |
|---|---|---|---|---|---|---|---|---|---|---|---|
| Sweden (Edin) | 1 | 0 | 2 | 0 | 1 | 0 | 1 | 0 | 2 | 0 | 7 |
| Scotland (Mouat) | 0 | 2 | 0 | 2 | 0 | 2 | 0 | 1 | 0 | 1 | 8 |

Player percentages
| Sweden | | Scotland | |
|---|---|---|---|
| Christoffer Sundgren | 93% | Hammy McMillan Jr. | 91% |
| Rasmus Wranå | 93% | Bobby Lammie | 88% |
| Oskar Eriksson | 91% | Grant Hardie | 95% |
| Niklas Edin | 91% | Bruce Mouat | 86% |
| Total | 92% | Total | 90% |

=== Semifinals ===
Saturday, April 5, 3:00 pm

| Sheet B | 1 | 2 | 3 | 4 | 5 | 6 | 7 | 8 | 9 | 10 | Final |
|---|---|---|---|---|---|---|---|---|---|---|---|
| Canada (Jacobs) | 1 | 0 | 1 | 0 | 0 | 0 | 2 | 0 | 0 | 0 | 4 |
| Scotland (Mouat) | 0 | 2 | 0 | 0 | 0 | 2 | 0 | 1 | 0 | 2 | 7 |

Player percentages
| Canada | | Scotland | |
|---|---|---|---|
| Ben Hebert | 100% | Hammy McMillan Jr. | 90% |
| Brett Gallant | 99% | Bobby Lammie | 83% |
| Marc Kennedy | 91% | Grant Hardie | 96% |
| Brad Jacobs | 84% | Bruce Mouat | 86% |
| Total | 93% | Total | 89% |

| Sheet D | 1 | 2 | 3 | 4 | 5 | 6 | 7 | 8 | 9 | 10 | Final |
|---|---|---|---|---|---|---|---|---|---|---|---|
| Switzerland (Schwaller) | 2 | 0 | 0 | 0 | 2 | 2 | 0 | 1 | 0 | X | 7 |
| China (Xu) | 0 | 0 | 0 | 1 | 0 | 0 | 1 | 0 | 1 | X | 3 |

Player percentages
| Switzerland | | China | |
|---|---|---|---|
| Pablo Lachat-Couchepin | 83% | Li Zhichao | 81% |
| Sven Michel | 94% | Wang Zhiyu | 76% |
| Yannick Schwaller | 92% | Fei Xueqing | 85% |
| Benoît Schwarz-van Berkel | 90% | Xu Xiaoming | 84% |
| Total | 90% | Total | 81% |

=== Bronze medal game ===
Sunday, April 6, 9:00 am

| Sheet C | 1 | 2 | 3 | 4 | 5 | 6 | 7 | 8 | 9 | 10 | Final |
|---|---|---|---|---|---|---|---|---|---|---|---|
| Canada (Jacobs) | 3 | 0 | 0 | 5 | 2 | 0 | 0 | 1 | X | X | 11 |
| China (Xu) | 0 | 0 | 1 | 0 | 0 | 1 | 0 | 0 | X | X | 2 |

Player percentages
| Canada | | China | |
|---|---|---|---|
| Ben Hebert | 98% | Li Zhichao | 86% |
| Brett Gallant | 95% | Wang Zhiyu | 95% |
| Marc Kennedy | 94% | Fei Xueqing | 83% |
| Brad Jacobs | 91% | Xu Xiaoming | 66% |
| Total | 95% | Total | 82% |

=== Final ===
Sunday, April 6, 3:00 pm

| Sheet C | 1 | 2 | 3 | 4 | 5 | 6 | 7 | 8 | 9 | 10 | Final |
|---|---|---|---|---|---|---|---|---|---|---|---|
| Scotland (Mouat) | 0 | 0 | 0 | 0 | 2 | 0 | 2 | 0 | 0 | 1 | 5 |
| Switzerland (Schwaller) | 1 | 0 | 0 | 0 | 0 | 2 | 0 | 1 | 0 | 0 | 4 |

Player percentages
| Scotland | | Switzerland | |
|---|---|---|---|
| Hammy McMillan Jr. | 91% | Pablo Lachat-Couchepin | 95% |
| Bobby Lammie | 89% | Sven Michel | 91% |
| Grant Hardie | 86% | Yannick Schwaller | 91% |
| Bruce Mouat | 92% | Benoît Schwarz-van Berkel | 93% |
| Total | 90% | Total | 93% |

== Statistics ==
=== Player percentages ===
Final Round Robin Percentages

Key
| All-Star Team |

| Leads | % |
|---|---|
| (Canada) Ben Hebert | 94.6 |
| (Sweden) Christoffer Sundgren | 94.0 |
| (Norway) Gaute Nepstad | 91.3 |
| (Czech Republic) Lukáš Klípa | 90.9 |
| (Switzerland) Pablo Lachat-Couchepin | 90.3 |
| (China) Li Zhichao | 90.2 |
| (Scotland) Hammy McMillan Jr. | 90.0 |
| (Germany) Johannes Scheuerl | 89.9 |
| (United States) Mark Fenner | 89.1 |
| (Italy) Mattia Giovanella | 89.0 |
| (Japan) Satoshi Koizumi | 87.3 |
| (Austria) Florian Mavec | 83.3 |
| (South Korea) Kim Jin-hun | 78.0 |

| Seconds | % |
|---|---|
| (Sweden) Rasmus Wranå | 90.3 |
| (Canada) Brett Gallant | 90.2 |
| (Scotland) Bobby Lammie | 88.2 |
| (Switzerland) Sven Michel | 88.1 |
| (Italy) Sebastiano Arman | 86.3 |
| (Norway) Bendik Ramsfjell | 86.0 |
| (China) Wang Zhiyu | 83.6 |
| (Austria) Martin Reichel (Note: Includes five games throwing lead rocks) | 82.6 |
| (United States) Andrew Stopera | 82.1 |
| (South Korea) Kim Chang-min (Note: Played in nine games; five as second and four as third) | 81.1 |
| (Germany) Felix Messenzehl | 81.0 |
| (Japan) Shingo Usui (Note: Played in all games) | 80.2 |
| (South Korea) Pyo Jeong-min (Note: Includes eight games throwing lead rocks) | 80.1 |
| (Czech Republic) Martin Jurík | 78.7 |
| (Austria) Matthäus Hofer (Note: Played in eight games) | 78.4 |

| Thirds | % |
|---|---|
| (Canada) Marc Kennedy | 90.2 |
| (Scotland) Grant Hardie | 88.2 |
| (Sweden) Oskar Eriksson | 87.5 |
| (Switzerland) Yannick Schwaller (Skip) | 86.5 |
| (Norway) Martin Sesaker | 85.5 |
| (China) Fei Xueqing | 84.8 |
| (Germany) Benjamin Kapp | 84.8 |
| (Italy) Amos Mosaner | 84.8 |
| (Czech Republic) Marek Černovský | 84.2 |
| (United States) Thomas Howell | 82.7 |
| (Japan) Tsuyoshi Yamaguchi | 80.8 |
| (South Korea) Kim Eun-bin (Note: Includes four games throwing second rocks and five games throwing fourth rocks) | 75.9 |
| (Austria) Jonas Backofen | 74.5 |

| Skips | % |
|---|---|
| (Canada) Brad Jacobs | 92.7 |
| (Switzerland) Benoît Schwarz-van Berkel (Fourth) | 86.7 |
| (Sweden) Niklas Edin | 85.3 |
| (Scotland) Bruce Mouat | 85.3 |
| (Norway) Magnus Ramsfjell | 85.0 |
| (Germany) Marc Muskatewitz | 83.4 |
| (China) Xu Xiaoming | 81.9 |
| (Japan) Riku Yanagisawa | 80.2 |
| (Italy) Joël Retornaz | 79.7 |
| (United States) Korey Dropkin | 79.2 |
| (Czech Republic) Lukáš Klíma | 79.2 |
| (South Korea) Kim Hyo-jun (Note: Includes five games throwing third rocks) | 74.0 |
| (Austria) Mathias Genner | 68.5 |

=== Perfect games ===
Minimum 10 shots thrown

| Player | Team | Position | Shots | Opponent |
|---|---|---|---|---|
| Bruce Mouat | Scotland | Skip | 12 | Austria |
| Mattia Giovanella | Italy | Lead | 12 | South Korea |
| Ben Hebert | Canada | Lead | 16 | South Korea |
| Satoshi Koizumi | Japan | Lead | 18 | Sweden |
| Christoffer Sundgren | Sweden | Lead | 20 | Switzerland |
| Marc Muskatewitz | Germany | Skip | 12 | Japan |
| Niklas Edin | Sweden | Skip | 12 | United States |
| Hammy McMillan Jr. | Scotland | Lead | 20 | Switzerland |
| Pablo Lachat-Couchepin | Switzerland | Lead | 20 | Scotland |
| Christoffer Sundgren | Sweden | Lead | 20 | Germany |
| Benoît Schwarz-van Berkel | Switzerland | Fourth | 12 | Italy |
| Ben Hebert | Canada | Lead | 14 | China |
| Brett Gallant | Canada | Second | 16 | Switzerland |
| Mark Fenner | United States | Lead | 20 | South Korea |
| Fei Xueqing | China | Third | 12 | South Korea |
| Ben Hebert | Canada | Lead | 20 | Scotland (semifinal) |

== Awards ==
The awards and all-star team are as follows:

All-Star Team

- Fourth: Brad Jacobs, Canada
- Third: Marc Kennedy, Canada
- Second: Rasmus Wranå, Sweden
- Lead: Ben Hebert, Canada

Collie Campbell Memorial Award

- Martin Sesaker, Norway

== Final standings ==
| Place | Team |
|---|---|
| 1st place, gold medalist(s) | Scotland |
| 2nd place, silver medalist(s) | Switzerland |
| 3rd place, bronze medalist(s) | Canada |
| 4 | China |
| 5 | Sweden |
| 6 | Norway |
| 7 | Czech Republic |
| 8 | Germany |
| 9 | Japan |
| 10 | Italy |
| 11 | United States |
| 12 | Austria |
| 13 | South Korea |

== National playdowns ==
- (Canada) 2025 Montana's Brier
- 2025 Japan Curling Championships
- (South Korea) 2024 Korean Curling Championships
- 2025 United States Men's Curling Championship
