= Rachel Hannen =

Scottish female curler

- Curler ♀
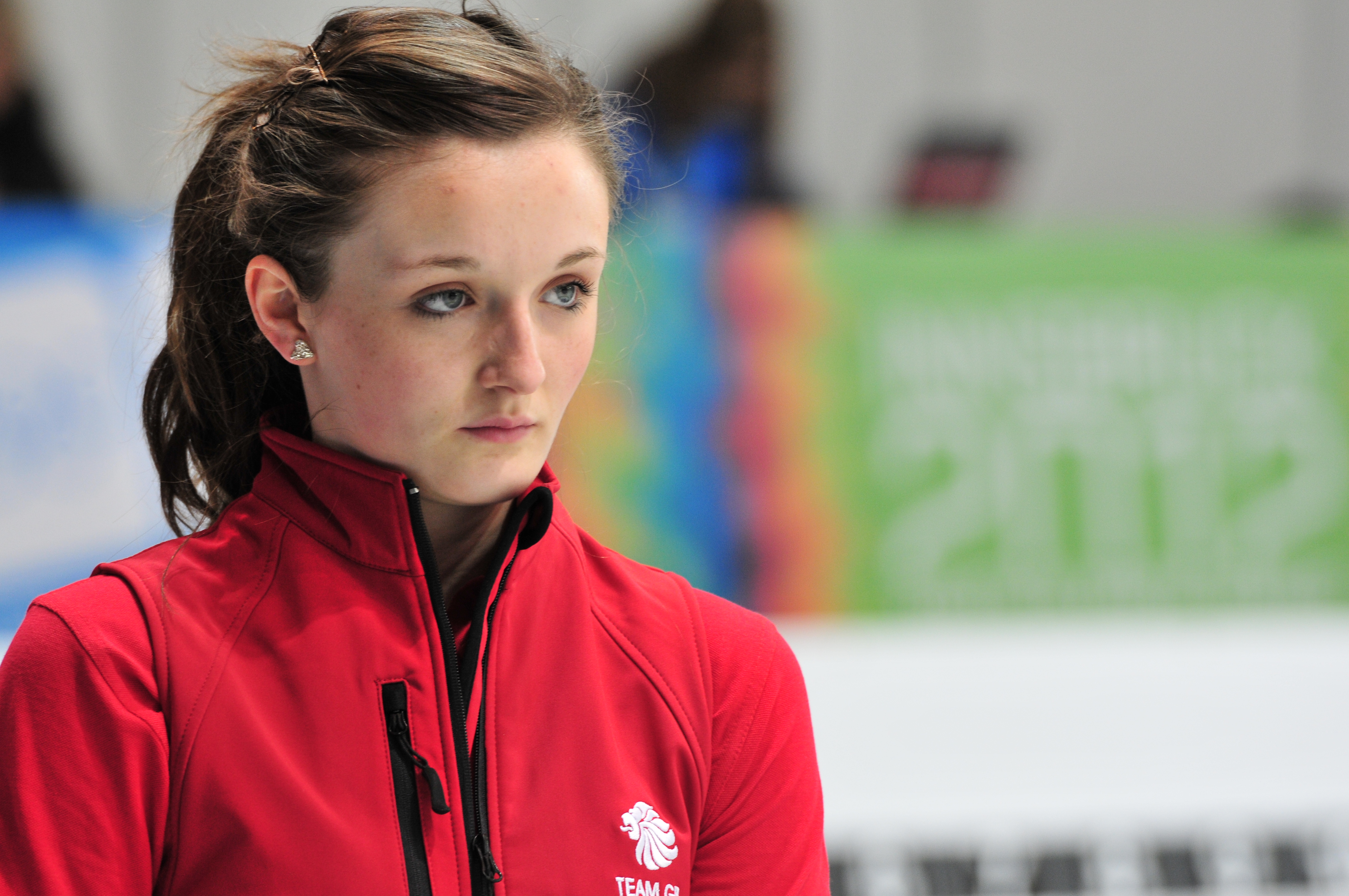
- Born: 27 January 1995 (age 31); Edinburgh, Scotland

Team
- Curling club: East Kilbride & Haremyres CC

Curling career
- Member Association: Scotland; United Kingdom
- World Championship: 1 (2016)
- European Championship: 1 (2015)
- Other appearances: World Junior Championships: 3 (2014, 2015, 2016), Winter Universiade: 1 (2017), Winter Youth Olympics: 2012 (mixed, mixed doubles)
Medal record
Curling
European Championships
Silver medal – second place	2015 Esbjerg
World Junior Championships
Silver medal – second place	2015 Tallinn
Scottish Women's Championship
Bronze medal – third place	2015 Perth
Bronze medal – third place	2018 Perth

Rachel Hannen (born 27 January 1995 in Edinburgh, Scotland) is a Scottish curler.

== Teams ==
=== Women's ===
Season	Skip	Third	Second	Lead	Alternate	Coach	Events
2011–12	Gina Aitken	Katy Richardson	Rowena Kerr	Rachel Hannen			SWCC 2012 (8th)
2013–14	Gina Aitken	Naomi Brown	Rowena Kerr	Rachel Hannen	Mhairi Baird (WJCC)	David Aitken	SJCC 2014 (gold); WJCC 2014 (8th)
2013–14	Lorna Vevers	Sarah Reid	Rebecca Kesley	Rachel Hannen			SWCC 2014 (4th)
2014–15	Gina Aitken	Naomi Brown	Rowena Kerr	Rachel Hannen	Karina Aitken (WJCC)	David Aitken	SJCC 2015 (gold); SWCC 2015 (bronze); WJCC 2015 (silver)
2015–16	Eve Muirhead	Anna Sloan	Vicki Adams	Sarah Reid	Rachel Hannen	David Hay	ECC 2015 (silver); WCC 2016 (5th)
2015–16	Sophie Jackson	Naomi Brown	Rachael Halliday	Rachel Hannen	Katie Murray (WJCC)	Robin Halliday	SJCC 2016 (gold); WJCC 2016 (9th); SWCC 2016 (6th)
2016–17	Gina Aitken	Rowena Kerr	Rachael Halliday	Rachel Hannen	Angharad Ward (WUG)	Mairi Milne	WUG 2017 (5th); SWCC 2017 (6th)
2017–18	Claire Hamilton	Gina Aitken	Rachael Halliday	Rachel Hannen			SWCC 2018 (bronze)

=== Mixed ===
Season	Skip	Third	Second	Lead	Coach	Events
2011–12	Duncan Menzies	Angharad Ward	Thomas Muirhead	Rachel Hannen	Brad Askew	WYOG 2012 (10th)
2014–15	Bruce Mouat (fourth)	Gina Aitken (skip)	Mark Munro	Rachel Hannen		SMxCC 2015 (7th)
2015–16	Bruce Mouat	Gina Aitken	Mark Munro	Rachel Hannen		SMxCC 2016 (bronze)
2016–17	Duncan Menzies	Naomi Brown	Mark Munro	Rachel Hannen		SMxCC 2017 (5th)
2017–18	Bobby Lammie	Naomi Brown	Jay McWilliam	Rachel Hannen		SMxCC 2018 (bronze)

=== Mixed doubles ===
Season	Male	Female	Coach	Events
2011–12	Marek Černovský	Rachel Hannen	Brad Askew	WYOG 2012 (9th)
2016–17	Bobby Lammie	Rachel Hannen		SMDCC 2017 (silver)

== Personal life ==
Her mother Isobel is a 1985 World silver medallist curler and also coaches. Her grandmother Isobel Torrance is a 1982 World bronze medallist and two-time Scottish women's champion curler.
