= Martin Sesaker =

Norwegian curler (born 1994)

- Curler
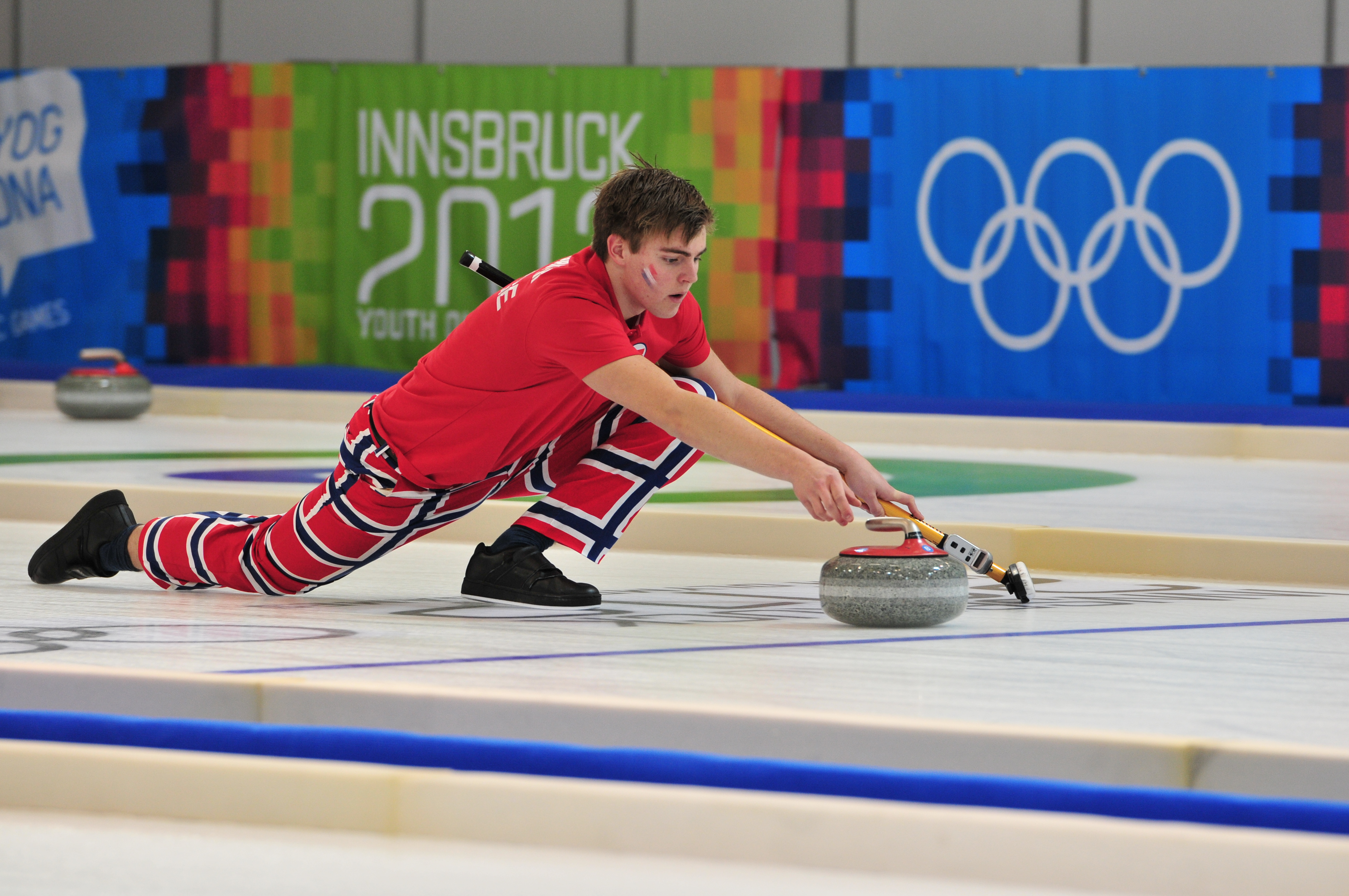
- Martin Sesaker
- Born: 9 May 1994 (age 32); Oslo, Norway

Team
- Curling club: Trondheim CK, Trondheim, NOR
- Skip: Andreas Hårstad
- Third: Martin Sesaker
- Second: Willhelm Næss
- Lead: Emil Sæther

Curling career
- Member Association: Norway
- World Championship: 4 (2022, 2023, 2024, 2025)
- European Championship: 3 (2023, 2024, 2025)
- Olympic: 1 (2026)
Medal record
Curling
Representing Norway
European Championships
Bronze medal – third place	2024 Lohja
World Junior Curling Championships
Bronze medal – third place	2014 Flims
Winter Universiade
Gold medal – first place	2019 Krasnoyarsk
Youth Olympic Games
Silver medal – second place	2012 Innsbruck	Mixed doubles

Martin Sesaker (born 9 May 1994) is a Norwegian curler from Trondheim. He currently plays third on Team Andreas Hårstad.

== Career ==
=== Juniors ===
Sesaker made his international début for Norway at the 2012 Winter Youth Olympics, throwing fourth stones on the team, skipped by Markus Skogvold. The team finished pool play with a 3–4 record, putting them in a tie with China. The team went on to beat China in a tiebreaker game, but lost in the quarter-finals to Sweden. Sesaker was then paired with Kim Eun-bi of South Korea for the mixed doubles competition. The team made it all the way to the final where they faced off against the pair of Michael Brunner of Switzerland and Nicole Muskatewitz of Germany. In the final, Sesaker and Kim were downed 13–2, settling for silver.

The following season, Sesaker joined the Norwegian junior men's team, playing second on the team, which was skipped by Eirik Mjøen. The team played in the 2013 World Junior Curling Championships, where they finished in fifth place, with a 5–4 record. The following year, Sesaker played as the team's alternate at the 2014 World Junior Curling Championships. The team finished the round-robin in first place with a 7–2 record. In the playoffs however, they lost both the 1 vs. 2 games to Scotland, then the semifinal to Switzerland, before rebounding in the bronze medal game against Canada, which they won 7–5. Sesaker played in four games at the event. Sesaker was promoted to the team's third at the 2015 World Junior Curling Championships. The team, now skipped by Gaute Nepstad finished the round-robin with a 4–5 record, finishing in sixth place, and out of the playoffs.

=== Men's ===
Sesaker played third for Norway at the 2019 Winter Universiade. The team, which was skipped by Magnus Ramsfjell finished the round-robin with a 5–4 record. The team then went on to win all of their playoff games to claim the gold medal. Sesaker continued to play for the Ramsfjell rink the following season, winning the 2020 Norwegian Men's Curling Championship.

The Ramsfjell Universiade championship rink re-united for the 2021–22 curling season, and won the 2022 Norwegian Men's Curling Championship. It was Sesakers's first national men's championship. The team was chosen to represent Norway at the 2022 World Men's Curling Championship, where they finished in 10th with a 5–7 record. That season, the team also won the 2021 Prague Classic World Curling Tour event.

During the 2022–23 curling season, the team won the Norwegian men's championship again and won the 2022 Curling Masters Champéry World Curling Tour event. They also played in the 2022 Masters and 2023 Canadian Open Grand Slam of Curling events. They made it to the semifinals of the Masters and failed to qualify for the playoffs in the Canadian Open. The team was chosen to represent Norway once again at the 2023 World Men's Curling Championship, where they went 10–2 in the round robin. This put the team in the playoffs, where they lost to Italy (skipped by Joël Retornaz) in the qualification game. The following week, the team played in the 2023 Players' Championship, where they went 2–3, missing the playoffs. Team Ramsfjell would win their first men's international medal at the 2024 European Curling Championships, where they would finish round-robin play with a 6–3 record and after losing in the semifinals, would beat Switzerland's Yannick Schwaller 7–4 to win the bronze medal.

Team Ramsfjell would represent Norway at the 2026 Winter Olympics, where they would qualify for the playoffs after finishing round robin with a 5–4 record. However, they would lose to Canada's Brad Jacobs in the semifinals and Switzerland's Yannick Schwaller 9–1 in the bronze medal game to finish in 4th place.

=== Mixed ===
After juniors, Sesaker played in mixed curling, playing for Norway at both the 2017 and 2018 World Mixed Curling Championships. Sesaker threw the second stone on the team, which was skipped by Ingvild Skaga. At the 2017 World Mixed, the team topped their pool with a 5–2 record. In the playoffs, they made it as far as the semifinals where they lost to Canada. They then lost in the bronze medal game to the Czech Republic, settling for fourth. At the 2018 World Mixed, they topped their pool again with a 6–1 record, and once again made it as far as the semifinals, where they lost to Canada. They then lost in the bronze medal game again, this time to Russia.

== Personal life ==
Before becoming a full timer curler, Sesaker worked as a construction worker and icemaker.
