= Kevin K. Lehmann =

American chemist and spectroscopist

Kevin K. Lehmann (born September 7, 1955, in Newark, New Jersey) is an American chemist and spectroscopist at the University of Virginia, best known for his work in the area of intramolecular and collisional dynamics, and for his advances in the method of cavity ring down spectroscopy (CRDS).

Raised in Irvington, New Jersey, a suburb of Newark, Lehmann studied chemical physics and mathematics at Rutgers University's Cook College, graduating with highest honors in 1977. His undergraduate research included work in reaction dynamics with John Krenos and John Tully of Bell Laboratories, photoelectron spectroscopy with Joseph Berkowitz of Argonne National Laboratory, and raman and resonate multiphoton ionization (REMPI) spectroscopies under Professor Lionel Goodman.

Lehmann went on to receive his doctorate in chemical physics from Harvard University in 1983, and was elected to the Harvard Society of Fellows, where he was a junior fellow until 1986. Under the direction of William Klemperer, Lehmann's graduate work involved studies of highly excited vibrational states using photoacoustic spectroscopy. During his time as a fellow, he served as a visiting scientist at Massachusetts Institute of Technology's George Harrison Spectroscopy Laboratory. There he developed with Stephen Coy the technique of microwave-detected, microwave-optical double resonance, which permits the automatic assignment of complex spectra.

Appointed to the chemistry faculty of Princeton University in 1985, Lehmann received both the Henry and Camille Dreyfus Award for new faculty and the Presidential Young Investigator Award from the National Science Foundation in his first year with the university. In 1987, the university acknowledged him with the Camille and Henry Dreyfus Teacher-Scholar Award. He was promoted to associate professor in 1991, and to full professor in 1995, the same year he was named a fellow of the American Physical Society. He received the Thomas A. Edison Patent Award in 2002 for his work in CRDS, and in 2003, was granted the Earle K. Plyler Prize in Molecular Spectroscopy.

Lehmann left Princeton in 2005 to join the faculty of the University of Virginia, where he has continued his work in development of ultrasensitive spectroscopic methods with applications in trace gas detection, as well as studies of molecular dynamics in the gas phase and superfluid helium.

== Articles by Kevin K. Lehmann ==
- "Potential of a neutral impurity in a large 4He cluster"
- "The infrared multiphoton excitation and photochemistry of DN3"
