= Arianna Losano =

Italian curler

- Curler
- Born: 13 June 1994 (age 32)

Team
- Curling club: 3S Sys-Tek; Pinerolo, ITA

Curling career
- Member Association: Italy
- World Championship: 1 (2017)
- World Mixed Championship: 2 (2018, 2023)
- European Championship: 2 (2013, 2014)

Arianna Losano (born 13 June 1994 in Italy) is an Italian curler.

== Career ==
Losano plays in lead position and is left-handed. Losano plays lead For Diana Gaspari and they qualified for the 2017 World Women's Curling Championship
