= Doubles curling =

Team sport played on ice

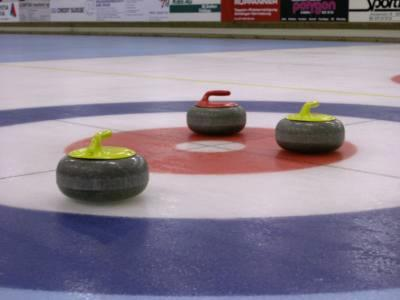
Curling stones

Doubles curling (most commonly seen as mixed doubles) is a variation of the sport of curling with only two players on each team. Mixed doubles is the most common format of doubles curling, where the term 'mixed' specifies that each team is composed of one man and one woman. The term mixed is also used to describe a specific format of 4-person team curling where the team consists of two men and two women and the throwing order alternates genders, see mixed team.

With its smaller teams and quicker games, doubles curling has provided an opportunity for more countries to participate in international competition. At the 2019 World Mixed Doubles Championship 48 of the 61 World Curling member countries were represented, including the first international curling competition for Kosovo, Ukraine, Nigeria, Saudi Arabia, and Mexico.

== History ==
The idea was developed by Curling Canada's Warren Hansen in 2001 to be one of four discipline variations for the inaugural Continental Cup of Curling.

The first World Mixed Doubles Championship took place in 2008. Since its inception, Switzerland has won six of its first ten titles. Russia and Hungary have won their first world curling titles in the mixed doubles championship, and New Zealand, France, Austria, and the Czech Republic have won their first world curling medals.

In 2002, Olympic scholar Bob Barney advocated for mixed doubles curling to be added to the Winter Olympics. He argued that it was a sport without any "gender factor", and high television ratings; and noted that equestrian events at the Summer Olympics was the only Olympic sport allowing males and females to compete against each other.

The IOC did not approve the event for inclusion into the 2010 Winter Olympics, but an attempt to include the mixed doubles in the following winter Olympiad succeeded, making its Olympic debut at the 2018 Winter Olympics. John Morris and Kaitlyn Lawes won the first mixed doubles gold medal for Canada, defeating Switzerland in the final. The Olympic Athletes from Russia won the bronze medal match only to have their medal stripped from them after Alexander Krushelnitsky failed a drug test. Team Norway, who had finished fourth, was then awarded the bronze medal.

== Rules of play ==
In doubles curling each two-person team plays with six stones, one of which is positioned in play before the start of the end. One stone is placed on the center line in the 4-foot circle of the house such that the back edge of the stone is aligned with the back edge of the circle. The other positioned stone is placed on the center line as a guard in front of the house. The exact placement of this positioned guard is chosen from six possible locations and must be agreed upon by the teams before the game. The six possible locations are immediately in front of and behind three points along the center line: the midpoint between the hog line and the front of the house, and 3 feet in front of and behind that midpoint. The teams decide on the guard location based on ice conditions, such as the amount of curl expected, and the same location must be used the entire game. The team that did not score in the previous end decides which team's stone is placed in the house and which team's stone is placed as a guard. The team whose positioned stone is the guard throws the first stone that end. In high-level play, teams therefore usually elect to have their stone placed in the house, to keep the advantage of the hammer. If there was no score in the previous end then the team that threw the first stone gets to decide which team's stone goes where; this means that unlike in traditional team curling, the team with the hammer does not usually get to keep it if the end is blanked.

The team that has the decision on the placement of the positioned stones also has the option to use their power play. Each team may use the power play only once per game and it cannot be during an extra end. The power play allows the positioned stones to be moved to the side of the sheet (which side is at the discretion of the team using the power play) with the back edge of the stone in the house positioned on the tee line where the 8-foot and 12-foot circles meet and the guard correspondingly moved to the side of the guard zone.

Of the five stones each team delivers during an end, one player throws the first and last stone while the other player must throw the three in between. Unlike in traditional curling, the throwing order may change between ends. In high-level mixed doubles play, it is common for the female partner to deliver the first and last stones, and for the male partner to deliver the middle three. The player that is not delivering the stone may act as a sweeper or as skip at the far end, and the player throwing the stone often gets up after releasing the stone to sweep.

No stone, including those in the house, can be removed from play prior to the delivery of the fourth stone of an end. If there is a violation, the delivered stone is removed from play and any stones moved are returned to their original position by the non-offending team.

The game is scored the same as traditional curling, where the team with a stone in the house closest to the button scores one point for every stone in the house closer to the button than the closest opposing stone. A game is completed after eight ends unless an extra end is required due to a tie, or if a team concedes before reaching that point.

== Rule changes ==
- 2008: Mixed doubles rules formalized by World Curling Federation.
- 2015: (Note: 2015 New Zealand Winter Games served as the first test event prior.) Positioned stone in the house is moved from just behind tee line to just in front of the back edge of the 4-foot. Teams are no longer separated to opposite ends of the sheet at the start of delivery. A stone delivered out of rotation is removed from play instead of rethrown. Power play is introduced.
- 2018: Blank due to equal measurement no longer gives up hammer/positioned stone placement decision.

== Major competitions ==
- Continental Cup of Curling - International tournament where doubles curling was debuted in 2002
- United States Mixed Doubles Championship - held annually since 2008, winner represents USA at World Mixed Doubles Championship
- Canadian Mixed Doubles Championship - held annually since 2013, winner represents Canada at World Mixed Doubles Championship
- World Mixed Doubles Championship - held annually since 2008
- Winter Olympics - Mixed doubles event first included at 2018 Winter Olympics

== See also ==
- Scotch doubles
