= Alexandra Rout =

Figure skater

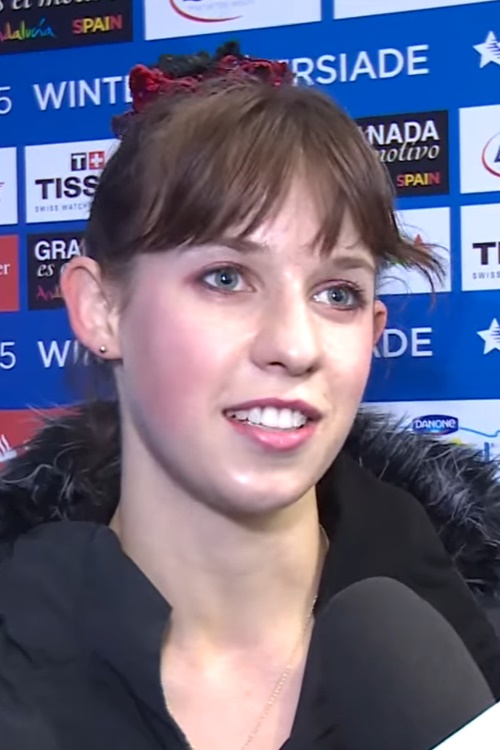
- Alexandra Rout at the 2015 Winter Universiade

Personal information
- Other names: Allie Rout
- Born: 6 August 1993 (age 33) Auckland, New Zealand
- Height: 1.49 m (4 ft 10 1/2 in)

Figure skating career
- Country: New Zealand
- Discipline: Women's singles
- Began skating: 2009

Medal record
New Zealand Championships
Gold medal – first place	2007–08 Christchurch	Singles
Gold medal – first place	2008–09 Gore	Singles
Gold medal – first place	2009–10 Auckland	Singles
Gold medal – first place	2014–15 Dunedin	Singles
Gold medal – first place	2015–16 Auckland	Singles
Gold medal – first place	2016–17 Christchurch	Singles

Alexandra "Allie" Rout (born 6 August 1993) is a New Zealand figure skater. She is a six-time New Zealand national champion (2008–2010, 2015–2017).

At her ISU Junior Grand Prix debut in Croatia, she placed 7th with a score of 115.17 points. At the 2008 World Junior Figure Skating Championships in Sofia, Bulgaria, Rout finished 22nd overall. She became the first New Zealand-trained ladies skater to qualify for the free skate at the World Junior Championships.

== Programs ==
Season	Short program	Free skating
2009–2010	Cirque du Soleil; Innocence; Zydeko by Benoît Jutras	Peer Gynt; Morning Mood; In the Hall of the Mountain King by Edvard Grieg performed by Maksim Mrvica
2008–2009	The Pink Panther by Henry Mancini	Peer Gynt; Morning Mood; In the Hall of the Mountain King by Edvard Grieg performed by Maksim Mrvica
2007–2008	The War of the Worlds by Jeff Wayne	Piano Concerto No. 4 by Edvard Grieg performed by Maksim Mrvica

== Competitive highlights ==
- JGP – Event of the ISU Junior Grand Prix Series

Competition placements since the 2006–07 season
Season	2006–07	2007–08	2008–09	2009–10	2014–15	2015–16	2016–17
World Junior Championships		22nd	31st				
New Zealand Championships (Senior)		1st	1st	1st	1st	1st	1st
New Zealand Championships (Junior)	2nd	1st	1st	1st			
Australian Championships (Senior) (Note: Competed as a guest skater)		3rd	1st	3rd			
Australian Championships (Junior)	5th						
JGP Croatia		7th					
JGP France			12th				
JGP Germany				20th			
JGP Italy			5th				
Nebelhorn Trophy				28th			
New Zealand Winter Games				4th			
Winter Universiade					23rd		

== Detailed results ==
=== Senior level ===
Results in the 2009–10 season
Date	Event	SP		FS		Total	
Date	Event	P	Score	P	Score	P	Score
Aug 28–30, 2009	2009 New Zealand Winter Games	4	39.80	4	68.26	4	108.06
Sep 23–26, 2009	(Germany) 2009 Nebelhorn Trophy	30	29.32	27	57.86	28	87.17

Results in the 2014–15 season
Date	Event	SP		FS		Total	
Date	Event	P	Score	P	Score	P	Score
Feb 3–8, 2015	(Spain) 2015 Winter Universiade	21	36.68	23	61.96	23	98.64

=== Junior level ===
Results in the 2007–08 season
Date	Event	SP		FS		Total	
Date	Event	P	Score	P	Score	P	Score
Sep 27–30, 2007	2007 JGP Croatia	5	43.05	8	72.12	7	115.17
Feb 25 – Mar 2, 2008	(Bulgaria) 2008 World Junior Championships	23	40.70	18	67.02	22	107.72

Results in the 2008–09 season
Date	Event	SP		FS		Total	
Date	Event	P	Score	P	Score	P	Score
Aug 27–31, 2008	2008 JGP France	9	40.92	14	61.82	12	102.74
Sep 3–7, 2008	2008 JGP Italy	8	43.16	3	73.81	5	116.97
Feb 22 – Mar 1, 2009	(Bulgaria) 2009 World Junior Championships	30	36.56	—N/a	—N/a	30	36.56

Results in the 2009–10 season
Date	Event	SP		FS		Total	
Date	Event	P	Score	P	Score	P	Score
Sep 30 – Oct 4, 2009	2009 JGP Germany	16	35.88	19	58.99	20	94.87
