= Greenland Reservoir =

Reservoir in New Zealand

Coordinates: 45°25′0″S 169°37′0″E

Greenland Reservoir is an artificial inland reservoir in the Central Otago district of the South Island of New Zealand. Located in the southern Ida Valley, it has 17 kilometres (11 mi) of coastline and is 4.79 square kilometres (1.85 sq mi) in area. At an altitude of 700 metres (2,300 ft), it is connected to the Manorburn Reservoir, which then feeds into the Manuherikia River through the Manor Burn. There is an access road to the northern shore of Greenland Reservoir, but the best way to the southern portion of the lake is by boat.

Like the Manorburn Reservoir, Greenland reservoir is a popular spot for local fishing in the later months of the year. Rainbow trout were released in the mid 20th century, and are the most common catch here.
