= New Zealand Figure Skating Championships =

Recurring figure skating competition

- Status: Active
- Genre: National championships
- Frequency: Annual
- Country: New Zealand
- Inaugurated: 1939
- Organiser: New Zealand Ice Figure Skating Association

The New Zealand Figure Skating Championships are an annual figure skating competition organised by to the New Zealand Ice Figure Skating Association to crown the national champions of New Zealand. The first New Zealand Championships were held in 1939 on the Manorburn Dam in Central Otago. Early championships were frequently held concurrently with competitions in speed skating and ice hockey. No competitions were held from 1940 to 1945 due to World War II. The championships were cancelled in 1992 when a snowstorm damaged the arena where the competition was to have taken place, and again in 2021 due to the COVID-19 pandemic.

Medals are awarded in men's singles, women's singles, pair skating, and ice dance at the senior and junior levels, although each discipline may not necessarily be held every year due to a lack of participants. Ricky Cockerill and Ivan McDonald are tied for winning the most New Zealand Championship titles in men's singles (with seven each), while Gay Le Comte and Alexandra Rout are tied for winning the most titles in women's singles (with six each). McDonald also holds the record in pair skating (with seven), although not all with the same partner, and the record in ice dance (with nine); again, not all with the same partner.

== History ==
The first New Zealand Championships were held in 1939 on the Manorburn Dam in Central Otago; Alex W. Robertson won the men's event and Sadie Cameron won the women's event. No competitions were held from 1940 to 1945 due to World War II, and when they returned in 1946, events in pair skating and ice dance were introduced. Early figure skating competitions were held concurrently with competitions in speed skating and ice hockey. Championships were conducted on frozen lakes on the South Island until 1952, when the Centaurus Ice Rink in Christchurch opened. The first indoor rink on the North Island opened in 1964 in Wellington.

The 1992 championships were scheduled to take place on 14 September at the Alpine Ice Sports Centre in Christchurch. However, the centre's roof collapsed under the weight of snow during the "Big Snow" of 27–28 August, leaving the organisers without a venue. Relocating the championships to Auckland was considered, but the event was ultimately cancelled. The championships were again cancelled in 2021 due to the COVID-19 pandemic.

The New Zealand Ice Figure Skating Association frequently sent a contingent of skaters to Australia to compete at the Australian Figure Skating Championships. Tristan Thode won the men's event at the 2007 Australian Championships, and Alexandra Rout won the women's event in 2008. The reverse is also true: many skaters from Australia have traveled to New Zealand to compete in the New Zealand Championships. While a guest skater from another country may be able to finish in first place and win the gold medal in a New Zealand event, they do not receive the title of New Zealand Champion; that honour goes to the highest-scoring New Zealand skater.

== Senior medalists ==
=== Men’s singles ===
Men's event medalists
Season	Location	Gold	Silver	Bronze	Ref.
1939–40	Manorburn Dam	Alex W. Robertson	Bertil Hjelstrom	Graham Rivers	
1940–46	No competitions due to World War II				
1946–47	Lake Tekapo	Brian Tufnail	(No records found)		
1947–48	Oturehua	Ronald Hosking	J.J. O'Kane & Brian Tufnail (tied)	No other competitors	
1948–49	Lake Tekapo	Thomas Grigg	Brian Tufnail	No other competitors	
1949–50	Lake Tekapo	Thomas Grigg	D.H. Grigg	No other competitors	
1950–51	Lake Tekapo	Thomas Grigg	D.H. Grigg	No other competitors	
1951–52	Cromwell	Thomas Grigg	D.H. Grigg	Jack Lyttle	
1952–53	Christchurch	Jack Lyttle	Thomas Grigg	No other competitors	
1953–54	Manorburn Dam	Thomas Grigg	Jack Lyttle	No other competitors	
1954–55	Christchurch	John Dowling	Ivan McDonald	J. Gillies	
1955–56	Christchurch	John Dowling	Ivan McDonald	Kees Stikkelman	
1956–57	Lake Tekapo	Ivan McDonald	(No records found)		
1957–58	Lake Ida	John Dowling	Ivan McDonald	Donald Hewinson	
1958–59	Christchurch	John Dowling	Ivan McDonald	Kees Stikkelman	
1959–60	Manorburn Dam	Ivan McDonald	(No records found)		
1960–61	Christchurch	Ivan McDonald	(No records found)		
1961–62	Manorburn Dam	Ivan McDonald	(No records found)		
1962–63	Christchurch	Ivan McDonald	No other competitors		
1963–64	Christchurch	Ivan McDonald	(No records found)		
1964–65	Christchurch	Gerry Glover	No other competitors		
1965–66	Arrowtown	Gerry Glover	Murray Herriott	No other competitors	
1966–67	Christchurch	Ivan McDonald	Murray Herriott	Charles Sparrow	
1967–68	Manorburn Dam	Murray Herriott (Note: While Murray Herriott was the only competitor in the men's event in 1967, he was not awarded the title of New Zealand Champion.)	No other competitors		
1968–69	Christchurch	Murray Herriott	No other competitors		
1969–70	Lake Tekapo	Murray Herriott	No other competitors		
1970–75	No men's competitors				
1975–76	Christchurch	Richard Bates	John Walkingshaw	No other competitors	
1976–77	Christchurch	Brian Meek (Australia) (Note: Richard Bates was named the 1976 New Zealand Champion because Brian Meek, the first-place finisher, was a guest skater from Australia.)	Richard Bates	Grant Walker	
1977–78	Auckland	John Walkingshaw	(No records found)		
1978–79	Invercargill	John Walkingshaw	No other competitors		
1979–80	Christchurch	John Walkingshaw	Bruce Cochrane	No other competitors	
1980–81	Manorburn Dam	John Walkingshaw	No other competitors		
1981–82	Auckland	Robin Smedley (Australia) (Note: John Walkingshaw was named the 1981 New Zealand Champion because Robin Smedley, the first-place finisher, was a guest skater from Australia.)	John Walkingshaw	Bruce Cochrane	
1982–83	Invercargill	John Walkingshaw	No other competitors		
1983–85	No men's competitors				
1985–86	Auckland	Christopher Blong	No other competitors		
1986–87	Christchurch	Christopher Blong	No other competitors		
1987–88	Auckland	Stephen Carr (Australia) (Note: Christopher Blong was named the 1987 New Zealand Champion because Stephen Carr, the first-place finisher, was a guest skater from Australia.)	Christopher Blong	No other competitors	
1988–89	Christchurch	No men's competitors			
1989–90	Auckland	Christopher Blong	No other competitors		
1990–91	Christchurch	Christopher Blong	No other competitors		
1991–92	Auckland	Christopher Blong	No other competitors		
1992–93	Christchurch	Competition cancelled due to snowstorm damage to the ice arena			
1993–98	No men's competitors				
1998–99	(No record found)	Ricky Cockerill	(No records found)		
1999–2000	Queenstown	Ricky Cockerill	No other competitors		
2000–01	Auckland	Ricky Cockerill	Dino Quattrocecere (South Africa)	Simon Thode	
2001–02	Christchurch	Ricky Cockerill	No other competitors		
2002–03	Gore	Ricky Cockerill	No other competitors		
2003–04	Auckland	Ricky Cockerill	Tristan Thode	Joel Watson	
2004–05	Queenstown	Ricky Cockerill	Joel Watson	Tristan Thode	
2005–06	Dunedin	Tristan Thode	Joel Watson	Mathieu Wilson	
2006–07	Auckland	Joel Watson	Tristan Thode	Mathieu Wilson	
2007–08	Christchurch	Tristan Thode	Joel Watson	Mathieu Wilson	
2008–09	Gore	Tristan Thode	Mathieu Wilson	Cameron Hems	
2009–10	Auckland	Cameron Hems	No other competitors		
2010–11	Dunedin	Cameron Hems	No other competitors		
2011–12	Gore	Cameron Hems	Chris Boyd	No other competitors	
2012–13	Auckland	Cameron Hems	No other competitors		
2013–14	Dunedin	Mathieu Wilson	No other competitors		
2014–17	No men's competitors				
2017–18	Dunedin	Brian Lee	Michael Durham	No other competitors	
2018–19	Auckland	Brian Lee	No other competitors		
2019–20	Gore	Brian Lee	No other competitors		
2020–21	Dunedin	Douglas Gerber	No other competitors		
2021–22	Competition cancelled due to the COVID-19 pandemic				
2022–23	Auckland	Douglas Gerber	No other competitors		
2023–25	No men's competitors				
2025–26	Auckland	Dwayne Li	No other competitors		
2026–27	Gore	Dwayne Li	No other competitors		

=== Women's singles ===
Women's event medalists
Season	Location	Gold	Silver	Bronze	Ref.
1939–40	Manorburn Dam	Sadie Cameron	Noel O'Kane	Ms. N. Hall	
1940–46	No competitions due to World War II				
1946–47	Lake Tekapo	Janet Richards	(No records found)		
1947–48	Oturehua	Penelope Barker	Corinne Gilkison	Ms. P. Wanklyn	
1948–49	Lake Tekapo	Corinne Gilkison	Susan Grigg	Shirley Buchanan	
1949–50	Lake Tekapo	Shirley Buchanan	Rosemary Murray	Susan Grigg	
1950–51	Lake Tekapo	Shirley Buchanan	Rosemary Murray	No other competitors	
1951–52	Cromwell	Joy Stewart	Shirley Buchanan	Susan Grigg	
1952–53	Christchurch	Joy Stewart	Susan Grigg	No other competitors	
1953–54	Manorburn Dam	Susan Grigg	Mrs. M.G. Brown	No other competitors	
1954–55	Christchurch	Lynne Withey	Rona Dickson	Dawn Murray	
1955–56	Christchurch	Lynne Withey	Rona Dickson	Lynne McDonald	
1956–57	Lake Tekapo	Rona Dickson	(No records found)		
1957–58	Lake Ida	Joan Walker	Lynne Withey	Pamela Morey	
1958–59	Christchurch	Joan Walker	Lynne McDonald	Pamela Morey	
1959–60	Manorburn Dam	Lynne McDonald	(No records found)		
1960–61	Christchurch	Sandra Jack	(No records found)		
1961–62	Manorburn Dam & Lake Tekapo	Sandra Jack	Wendy Grafton	No other competitors	
1962–63	Christchurch	Wendy Grafton	Sandra Jack	Susan McClea	
1963–64	Christchurch	Wendy Grafton	(No records found)		
1964–65	Christchurch	Shirley Bayne	Susan McClea	No other competitors	
1965–66	Arrowtown	Wendy Grafton	Ms. D. White	Lesley Anderson	
1966–67	Christchurch	Wendy Grafton	Susan Hoseit	Lesley Anderson	
1967–68	Manorburn Dam	Susan Hoseit	Lesley Anderson	Ms. C. Besley	
1968–69	Christchurch	Jeanne Wyatt	No other competitors		
1969–70	Lake Tekapo	Jeanne Begej	Valerie Smith	No other competitors	
1970–71	Manorburn Dam	Gay Le Comte	Valerie Gunn	Valerie Smith	
1971–72	Christchurch	Gay Le Comte	Valerie Gunn	Petricia Browne	
1972–73	Christchurch	Gay Le Comte	Ann Brennock	Valerie Gunn	
1973–74	Invercargill	Gay Le Comte	No other competitors		
1974–75	Auckland	Gay Le Comte	No other competitors		
1975–76	Christchurch	Gay Le Comte	Janna Greene	Katie Symmonds	
1976–77	Christchurch	Margaret Doolan (Australia) (Note: Margaret Doolan was not named the 1976 New Zealand Champion, because she was a guest skater from Australia.)	No other competitors		
1977–78	Auckland	Katie Symmonds	Karen Adam	(No record found)	
1978–79	Invercargill	Katie Symmonds	Vanessa Lewis	Ann Brennock-Tranter	
1979–80	Christchurch	Denyse Adam	Kathy Lindsay	Vanessa Lewis	
1980–81	Manorburn Dam	Denyse Adam	Glynis Crompton	No other competitors	
1981–82	Auckland	Denyse Adam	Kathy Lindsay	Liane Telling	
1982–83	Invercargill	Kathy Lindsay	Denyse Adam	No other competitors	
1983–84	Christchurch	Denyse Adam	No other competitors		
1984–85	Auckland	Denyse Adam	Jane Clifford	No other competitors	
1985–86	Manorburn Dam	Jane Clifford	No other competitors		
1986–87	Christchurch	Carey Shepherd	No other competitors		
1987–88	Auckland	Rosanna Blong	Carey Shepherd	Justine Brownlee	
1988–89	Christchurch	Justine Brownlee	Carey Shepherd	No other competitors	
1989–90	Auckland	Rosanna Blong	Carey Shepherd	No other competitors	
1990–91	Christchurch	Rosanna Blong	Sheryl Everson	No other competitors	
1991–92	Auckland	Rosanna Blong	Heather Nye	Sheryl Everson	
1992–93	Christchurch	Competition cancelled due to snowstorm damage to the ice arena			
1993–94	Christchurch	Heather Nye	Sheryl Everson	Kim MacDonald	
1994–95	(No record found)	Heather Nye	(No records found)		
1995–96	Auckland	Heather Nye	Rachel Fisher	Beverley Chamberlain	
1996–97	(No records found)	Rachel Fisher	(No records found)		
1997–98	(No records found)	Philippa Rawlins	(No record found)	Imelda-Rose Hegerty	
1998–99	(No records found)	Imelda-Rose Hegerty	(No records found)		
1999–2000	Queenstown	Imelda-Rose Hegerty	No other competitors		
2000–01	Auckland	Dirke O'Brien Baker	Zoe Bradfort (Australia)	Imelda-Rose Hegerty	
2001–02	Christchurch	Imelda-Rose Hegerty	No other competitors		
2002–03	Gore	Imelda-Rose Hegerty	Aslihan Aydin (Turkey)	Kirsten Mather (Australia)	
2003–04	Auckland	Sarah-Yvonne Prytula (Australia) (Note: Aslihan Aydin was named the 2003 New Zealand Champion because Sarah-Yvonne Prytula, the first-place finisher, was a guest skater from Australia. Aydin had competed the year before as a guest skater from Turkey.)	Aslihan Aydin	No other competitors	
2004–05	Queenstown	Morgan Figgins	Vicky Kuo	Rachel Fisher	
2005–06	Dunedin	Morgan Figgins	Vicky Kuo	Aslihan Aydin	
2006–07	Auckland	Morgan Figgins	Caitlin Haynes	No other competitors	
2007–08	Christchurch	Alexandra Rout	Morgan Figgins	Caitlin Haynes	
2008–09	Gore	Alexandra Rout	Morgan Figgins	No other competitors	
2009–10	Auckland	Alexandra Rout	Caitlyn Paul	Elizabeth O'Neill	
2010–11	Dunedin	Samantha Waugh	Morgan Figgins	Laura Mills	
2011–12	Gore	Morgan Figgins	Millie Campbell	Melissa Morris	
2012–13	Auckland	Morgan Figgins	Melissa Morris	Elizabeth O'Neill	
2013–14	Dunedin	Sarah MacGibbon	Kayla Doig (Australia)	Elizabeth O'Neill	
2014–15	Dunedin	Alexandra Rout	Morgan Templeton	Jessinta Martin (Australia)	
2015–16	Auckland	Alexandra Rout	Sarah MacGibbon	No other competitors	
2016–17	Christchurch	Alexandra Rout	Preeya Laud	Sarah MacGibbon	
2017–18	Dunedin	Brooke Tamepo	Isabella Bardua	Sarah Cullen (Australia)	
2018–19	Auckland	Isabella Bardua	Brooke Tamepo	Jennifer Toms (Australia)	
2019–20	Gore	Jocelyn Hong	Brooke Tamepo	Sarah MacGibbon	
2020–21	Dunedin	Ruth Xu	No other competitors		
2021–22	Competition cancelled due to the COVID-19 pandemic				
2022–23	Auckland	Jocelyn Hong	Ruth Xu	Danielle Gebser	
2023–24	Dunedin	Dani Gebser	Ella Smith	No other competitors	
2024–25	Christchurch	Petra Lahti	Mirika Armstrong	Cordelia Shi	
2025–26	Auckland	Petra Lahti	Cordelia Shi	Mirika Armstrong	
2026–27	Gore	Cara Tang	Brooke Cathro	Cordelia Shi	

=== Pairs ===
Pairs event medalists
Season	Location	Gold	Silver	Bronze	Ref.
1946–47	Lake Tekapo	Janet Richards; Brian Tufnail	(No records found)		
1947–48	Oturehua	Corinne Gilkison; Brian Tufnail	Ms. P. Wanklyn; Ronald Hosking	Penelope Barker; Thomas Grigg	
1948–49	Lake Tekapo	Corinne Gilkison; Brian Tufnail	No other competitors		
1949–50	Lake Tekapo	Rosemary Murray; Thomas Grigg	No other competitors		
1950–51	Lake Ida	Shirley Buchanan; Thomas Grigg	Mrs. Allchurch; Mr. A.H. Allchurch	No other competitors	
1951–52	Cromwell	Joy Stewart; Thomas Grigg	No other competitors		
1952–53	Christchurch	Shirley Buchanan; Thomas Grigg	No other competitors		
1953–54	Manorburn Dam	Susan Grigg; Tom Grigg	Lynne McDonald; Ivan McDonald	No other competitors	
1954–55	Christchurch	Lynne McDonald; Ivan McDonald	Lynne Withey; John Dowling	No other competitors	
1955–56	Christchurch	Lynne McDonald; Ivan McDonald	Lynne Withey; John Dowling	Dawn Murray; R. Mangos	
1956–57	Lake Tekapo	Lynne McDonald; Ivan McDonald	(No records found)		
1957–58	Lake Ida	Lynne Withey; John Dowling	Lynne McDonald; Ivan McDonald	Pamela Morey; Donald Hewinson	
1958–59	Manorburn Dam	Lynne McDonald; Ivan McDonald	Anne Dowling; John Dowling	No other competitors	
1959–60	Manorburn Dam	Lynne McDonald; Ivan McDonald	(No records found)		
1960–61	Christchurch	Anne Dowling; John Dowling	(No records found)		
1961–62	Manorburn Dam	Wendy Grafton; Ivan McDonald	No other competitors		
1962–63	Christchurch	Wendy Grafton; Ivan McDonald	No other competitors		
1963–64	Christchurch	Shirley Bayne; Gerry Glover	(No records found)		
1964–65	Christchurch	Shirley Bayne; Gerry Glover	No other competitors		
1965–66	Arrowtown	Lesley Anderson; Leslie Coxon	No other competitors		
1966–67	Christchurch	(Australia); Edwina Sloman; Bill Hewison; (Australia) (Note: Lesley Anderson and Leslie Coxon were named the 1966 New Zealand Champions, because Edwina Sloman and Bill Hewison, the first-place finishers, were guest skaters from Australia.)	Lesley Anderson; Leslie Coxon	Ms. S. Rowe; Mr. T. Rowe	
1967–68	Manorburn Dam	Judy Farr; Leslie Coxon	(No records found)		
1968–69	Christchurch	Judy Farr; Leslie Coxon	Petricia Browne; Kelvin Nicolle	No other competitors	
1969–70	Lake Tekapo	Petricia Browne; Kelvin Nicolle	No other competitors		
1970–71	Manorburn Dam	No pairs competitors			
1971–72	Christchurch	Ms. R. Loader; Kelvin Nicolle	No other competitors		
1972–74	No pairs competitors				
1974–75	Auckland	Julie Clarke; Grant Walker	Katie Symmonds; Mr. D. McDonald	No other competitors	
1975–76	Christchurch	Ann Brennock; Alan Brennock	Julie Clarke; Grant Walker	No other competitors	
1976–77	Christchurch	Julie Clarke; Grant Walker	Ann Brennock; Alan Brennock	Pauline McDonald; Manuel de Lira	
1977–78	Auckland	Ann Brennock; Alan Brennock	(No records found)		
1978–2010	No pairs competitors				
2010–11	Dunedin	Ariel Nadas; Grant Howie	No other competitors		
2011–12	Gore	Ariel Nadas; Grant Howie	No other competitors		
No pairs competitors since 2011–12

=== Ice dance ===
Ice dance event medalists
Season	Location	Gold	Silver	Bronze	Ref.
1946–47	Lake Tekapo	Janet Richards; Brian Tufnail	(No records found)		
1947–48	Oturehua	Corinne Gilkison; Brian Tufnail	Penelope Barker; Ronald Hosking	Ms. P. Wanklyn; Thomas Grigg	
1948–49	Lake Tekapo	Corinne Gilkison; Brian Tufnail	Ms. Trott; Keith Butters	No other competitors	
1949–50	Lake Tekapo	Susan Grigg; Keith Butters	No other competitors		
1950–51	Lake Ida	Shirley Buchanan; Thomas Grigg	Susan Grigg; Keith Butters	No other competitors	
1951–52	Cromwell	Joy Stewart; Thomas Grigg	Ms. J. Moore; Mr. J. Mercer	Susan Grigg; Mr. D.H. Grigg	
1952–53	Christchurch	Susan Grigg; Thomas Grigg	No other competitors		
1953–54	Manorburn Dam	Susan Grigg; Thomas Grigg	Lynne McDonald; Ivan McDonald	No other competitors	
1954–55	Christchurch	Rona Dickson; Kees Stikkelman	Lynne McDonald; Ivan McDonald	Ms. C. Adie; Jack Lyttle	
1955–56	Christchurch	Lynne McDonald; Ivan McDonald	Rona Dickson; Kees Stikkelman	Dawn Murray; Mr. R. Mangos	
1956–57	Lake Tekapo	Lynne McDonald; Ivan McDonald	(No records found)		
1957–58	Lake Ida	Lynne McDonald; Ivan McDonald	Lynne Withey; John Dowling	Pamela Morey; Donald Hewinson	
1958–59	Manorburn Dam	Anne Dowling; John Dowling	Lynne McDonald; Ivan McDonald	No other competitors	
1959–60	Manorburn Dam	Anne Dowling; John Dowling	(No records found)		
1960–61	Christchurch	Anne Dowling; John Dowling	(No records found)		
1961–62	Manorburn Dam	Wendy Grafton; Ivan McDonald	R. Stevens; Cees Stikkleman	No other competitors	
1962–63	Christchurch	Wendy Grafton; Ivan McDonald	Pamela Hewinson; Donald Hewinson	No other competitors	
1963–64	Christchurch	Wendy Grafton; Ivan McDonald	(No records found)		
1964–65	Christchurch	Lesley Anderson; Leslie Coxon	No other competitors		
1965–66	Arrowtown	Wendy Grafton; Gerry Glover	Lesley Anderson; Leslie Coxon	No other competitors	
1966–67	Christchurch	Wendy Grafton; Ivan McDonald	Lesley Anderson; Leslie Coxon	No other competitors	
1967–68	Manorburn Dam	No ice dance competitors			
1968–69	Christchurch	Christine Besley; Ivan McDonald	Ms. Wyatt; Mr. A. Mauger	No other competitors	
1969–70	Lake Tekapo	Pamela Hewinson; Donald Hewinson	No other competitors		
1970–71	Manorburn Dam	No ice dance competitors			
1971–72	Christchurch	Christine Wadsworth; Ivan McDonald	Petricia Browne; Kelvin Nicolle	Ann Brennock; Alan Brennock	
1972–73	Cromwell	Wendy Grafton; Ivan McDonald	Ann Brennock; Alan Brennock	No other competitors	
1973–74	Invercargill	Ann Brennock; Alan Brennock	(No records found)		
1974–75	Auckland	Ann Brennock; Alan Brennock	Katie Symmonds; Mr. D. McDonald	No other competitors	
1975–76	Christchurch	Janna Greene; Alan Wild	Pamela Hewinson; Kelvin Nicolle	Ann Brennock; Alan Brennock	
1976–77	Christchurch	Janna Greene; Alan Wild	Ann Brennock; Alan Brennock	Pamela Hewinson; Kelvin Nicolle	
1977–78	Auckland	Ann Brennock; Alan Brennock	Jacqueline Mellamphey; Andrew McGaughery	Jo O'Warn; Ray Goulter	
1978–79	Invercargill	Ann Brennock; Alan Brennock	Pamela Hewinson; Kelvin Nicolle	No other competitors	
1979–80	Christchurch	Ann Brennock; Alan Brennock	No other competitors		
1980–81	Manorburn Dam	Ann Brennock; Alan Brennock	No other competitors		
1981–84	No ice dance competitors				
1984–85	Auckland	Clare Shave; Chris Laurie	Jane Mentink; Mike Day	No other competitors	
1985–86	Manorburn Dam	Denise Borcoski; Kelvin Nicolle	No other competitors		
1986–87	Christchurch	Denise Borcoski; Kelvin Nicolle	No other competitors		
1987–97	No ice dance competitors				
1997–98	(No record found)	Kirsty MacDonald; Christopher Street	(No records found)		
1998–2000	No ice dance competitors				
2000–01	Auckland	(Australia); Rebecca Khoo; Evgeni Borounov; (Australia) (Note: Rebecca Khoo and Evgeni Borounov were not named the New Zealand Champions because they were guest skaters from Australia.)	No other competitors		
2001–13	No ice dance competitors				
2013–14	Dunedin	Ayesha Campbell; Shane Speden	No other competitors		
2014–21	No ice dance competitors				
2021–22	Competition cancelled due to the COVID-19 pandemic				
2022–23	Auckland	Charlotte Lafond-Fournier; Richard Kam	Isabelle Guise; Ethan Alday	No other competitors	
No ice dance competitors since 2022–23

== Junior medalists ==
=== Men's singles ===
Junior men's event medalists
Season	Location	Gold	Silver	Bronze	Ref.
1999–2000	Queenstown	Simon Thode	No other competitors		
2000–01	Auckland	Tristan Thode	No other competitors		
2001–02	Christchurch	Tristan Thode	No other competitors		
2002–03	Gore	Tristan Thode	Joel Watson	No other competitors	
2003–04	Auckland	Joel Watson	Robert McNamara (Australia)	Mathieu Wilson	
2004–05	Queenstown	Joel Watson	Mathieu Wilson	Cameron Fletcher (Australia)	
2005–06	Dunedin	Mathieu Wilson	No other competitors		
2006–07	Auckland	Mathieu Wilson	Cameron Hems	No other competitors	
2007–08	Christchurch	Cameron Hems	Grant Howie	No other competitors	
2008–09	Gore	Cameron Hems	No other competitors		
2009–10	Auckland	Cameron Hems	Brad McLachlan (Australia)	Chris Boyd	
2010–11	Dunedin	Chris Boyd	No other competitors		
2011–12	Gore	No junior men's competitors			
2012–13	Auckland	Darian Kaptich (Australia) (Note: Thomas Woodbridge was named the 2012 New Zealand Junior Champion because Darian Kaptich, the first-place finisher, was a guest skater from Australia.)	Thomas Woodbridge	No other competitors	
2013–14	Dunedin	Michael Durham	Daniel Cheuk	No other competitors	
2014–15	Dunedin	Michael Durham	Brian Lee	Thomas Woodbridge	
2015–16	Auckland	Michael Durham	Brian Lee	No other competitors	
2016–17	Christchurch	Michael Durham	Harrison Bain	No other competitors	
2017–18	Dunedin	Brian Lee	Harrison Bain	Connor McIver	
2018–19	Auckland	Harrison Bain	No other competitors		
2019–20	Gore	Douglas Gerber	Harrison Bain	Connor McIver	
2020–21	Dunedin	No junior men's competitors			
2021–22	Competition cancelled due to the COVID-19 pandemic				
2022–23	Auckland	Dwayne Li	No other competitors		
2023–24	Dunedin	Dwayne Li	Stepan Kadlcik	Blake Barraclough	
2024–25	Christchurch	Dwayne Li	Stepan Kadlcik	No other competitors	
2025–26	Auckland	No junior men's competitors			
2026–27	Gore	Michael Duan	No other competitors		

=== Women's singles ===
Junior women's event medalists
Season	Location	Gold	Silver	Bronze	Ref.
1999–2000	Queenstown	Nina McKenzie	No other competitors		
2000–01	Auckland	No junior women's competitors			
2001–02	Christchurch	Charlotte Dawson	No other competitors		
2002–03	Gore	Vicky Kuo	Ilona Voboril (Germany)	Michelle Cahill	
2003–04	Auckland	Morgan Figgins	Jacinta Greenwood (Australia)	Dee Pulman	
2004–05	Queenstown	Morgan Figgins	Dee Pulman	Vicky Kuo	
2005–06	Dunedin	Morgan Figgins	Olivia Van Asperen (Australia)	Elizabeth O'Neill	
2006–07	Auckland	Morgan Figgins	Alexandra Rout	Laura Mills	
2007–08	Christchurch	Alexandra Rout	Kyl Jade Betteridge (Australia)	Elizabeth O'Neill	
2008–09	Gore	Alexandra Rout	Samantha Waugh	Laura Mills	
2009–10	Auckland	Alexandra Rout	Sydnee Knight (Australia)	Taylor Dean (Australia)	
2010–11	Dunedin	Madelaine Parker	Jessie Park	Samantha Waugh	
2011–12	Gore	Madelaine Parker	Iyrin Quigley	Jessie Park	
2012–13	Auckland	Brin Berge	Jessie Park	Sarah MacGibbon	
2013–14	Dunedin	Madelaine Parker	Tracy Danbrook	Preeya Laud	
2014–15	Dunedin	Tracy Danbrook	Brooke Tamepo	Preeya Laud	
2015–16	Auckland	Brooke Tamepo	Tracy Danbrook	Christina Floka	
2016–17	Christchurch	Brooke Tamepo	Tracy Danbrook	Zara Anthony-Whigham	
2017–18	Dunedin	Nicola Korck	Jocelyn Hong	Pei-Lin Lee	
2018–19	Auckland	Jocelyn Hong	Lelin Wang	Ella Smith	
2019–20	Gore	Ruth Xu	Dani Gebser	Lelin Wang	
2020–21	Dunedin	Dani Gebser	Mirika Armstrong	Ella Smith	
2021–22	Competition cancelled due to the COVID-19 pandemic				
2022–23	Auckland	Misaki Joe	Cara Tang	Mirika Armstrong	
2023–24	Dunedin	Renee Tsai	Mirika Armstrong	Misaki Joe	
2024–25	Christchurch	Renee Tsai	Cara Tang	Misaki Joe	
2025–26	Auckland	Renee Tsai	Nicca Wu	Cara Tang	
2026–27	Gore	Judy Tong	Nicca Wu	Mia Chen	

=== Pairs ===
Junior pairs event medalists
Season	Location	Gold	Silver	Bronze	Ref.
1999–2008	No junior pairs competitors				
2008–09	Gore	Morgan Figgins; Grant Howie	No other competitors		
No junior pairs competitors since 2008–09

=== Ice dance ===
Junior ice dance event medalists
Season	Location	Gold	Silver	Bronze	Ref.
1999–2009	No junior ice dance competitors				
2009–10	Auckland	Ayesha Campbell; Shane Speden	No other competitors		
2010–11	Dunedin	Ayesha Campbell; Shane Speden	Anne-Sophie Shogimen; Dominic Shogimen	No other competitors	
2011–12	Gore	Ayesha Campbell; Shane Speden	No other competitors		
2012–13	Auckland	Ayesha Campbell; Shane Speden	No other competitors		
2013–14	Dunedin	No junior ice dance competitors			
2014–15	Dunedin	Anja Noetzel-Hayward; Connor McIver	Claudia Riley; Patrick Costley	Amelia Prowse; Sean Jones	
2015–16	Auckland	No junior ice dance competitors			
2016–17	Christchurch	Varshana Schelling; Liam McIver	No other competitors		
2017–18	Dunedin	Varshana Schelling; Liam McIver	No other competitors		
2018–21	No junior ice dance competitors				
2021–22	Competition cancelled due to the COVID-19 pandemic				
2022–23	Auckland	Lucienne Holtz; Tim Bradfield	No other competitors		
2023–24	Dunedin	Gemma Pickering; Benji Pickering	No other competitors		
No junior ice dance competitors since 2023–24

== Records ==
Records
Discipline	Most championship titles			
Discipline	Skater(s)	No.	Seasons	Ref.
Men's singles	Ricky Cockerill	7	1998/99 – 2004/05	
Men's singles	Ivan McDonald	7	1956/57; 1959/60 – 1963/64; 1966/67	
Women's singles	Gay Le Comte	6	1970/71 – 1975/76	
Women's singles	Alexandra Rout	6	2007/08 – 2009/10; 2014/15 – 2016/17	
Pairs	Ivan McDonald (Note: Ivan McDonald won five championship titles in pair skating while partnered with Lynne McDonald (1954/55–1956/57; 1958/59–1959/60) and two with Wendy Grafton (1961/62–1962/63).)	7	1954/55 – 1956/57; 1958/59 – 1959/60; 1961/62 – 1962/63	
Ice dance	Ivan McDonald (Note: Ivan McDonald won three championship titles in ice dance while partnered with Lynne McDonald (1955/56–1957/58; 1958/59–1959/60), five with Wendy Grafton (1961/62–1963/64; 1966/67; 1972/73), one with Christine Besley (1968/69), and one with Christine Wadsworth (1971/72).)	10	1955/56 – 1957/58; 1961/62 – 1963/64; 1966/67; 1968/69; 971/72 – 1972/73	
