= Yevhen Stadnyk =

Ukrainian male curler

- Curler ♂
- Born: 9 April 1976 (age 50)

Team
- Mixed doubles partner: Olena Pazderska

Curling career
- Member Association: Ukraine
- World Mixed Doubles Championship: 1 (2019)
Medal record
Curling

Yevhen Stadnyk (Ukrainian: Євге́н Ста́дник, Russian: Евге́ний Ста́дник; born April 9, 1976) is a Ukrainian curler.

== Teams and events ==
=== Mixed doubles ===
Season	Male	Female	Coach	Events
2018–19	Yevhen Stadnyk	Olena Pazderska	Dean Roth	WMDCC 2019 (45th)

== Personal life ==
Yevhen Stadnyk and his mixed doubles teammate Olena Pazderska live and curl in New Jersey, United States. They are the first-ever Ukrainian national curling team and made their debut at the 2019 World Mixed Doubles Championship.
