= Figure skating at the 2009 New Zealand Winter Games =

New Zealand Winter Games competition

2009 New Zealand Winter Games
- Type: Multi-level international
- Date: 28 August – 30
- Season: 2009–10
- Location: Dunedin
- Venue: Dunedin Ice Stadium

Champions
- Men's singles: (Japan) Kensuke Nakaniwa
- Ladies' singles: (Japan) Akiko Suzuki

Figure skating was held as part of the 2009 New Zealand Winter Games. The competition was open to all ISU member nations. It was organized by the New Zealand Winter Games and the New Zealand Ice Skating Association. Skaters competed in the disciplines of men's and ladies' singles on the levels of senior, junior, and novice. The figure skating competition at the New Zealand Winter Games was held between 28 and 30 August at the Dunedin Ice Stadium in Dunedin.

== Senior results ==
=== Men ===
| Rank | Name | Nation | Total points | SP | | FS | |
|---|---|---|---|---|---|---|---|
| 1 | Kensuke Nakaniwa | Japan | 189.58 | 1 | 62.67 | 1 | 126.91 |
| 2 | Seo Min-seok | South Korea | 103.55 | 2 | 39.37 | 2 | 64.18 |
| 3 | Andrew Dodds | Australia | 87.31 | 3 | 31.22 | 3 | 56.09 |
| 4 | Grant Howie | New Zealand | 79.77 | 4 | 30.55 | 4 | 49.22 |

=== Ladies ===
| Rank | Name | Nation | Total points | SP | | FS | |
|---|---|---|---|---|---|---|---|
| 1 | Akiko Suzuki | Japan | 159.10 | 1 | 59.33 | 1 | 99.77 |
| 2 | Mari Suzuki | Japan | 137.21 | 2 | 53.69 | 2 | 83.52 |
| 3 | Kim Na-young | South Korea | 119.84 | 3 | 46.93 | 3 | 72.91 |
| 4 | Allie Rout | New Zealand | 108.06 | 4 | 39.80 | 4 | 68.26 |
| 5 | Morgan Figgins | New Zealand | 83.47 | 5 | 30.88 | 5 | 52.59 |
| 6 | Fei Fei Hardy | Australia | 65.50 | 6 | 23.79 | 6 | 41.71 |
| 7 | Kayla Doig | Australia | 62.89 | 7 | 22.00 | 7 | 40.89 |
| WD | Laura Mills | New Zealand | | 8 | 19.89 | | |

- WD = Withdrawn

== Junior results ==
=== Men ===
| Rank | Name | Nation | Total points | SP | | FS | |
|---|---|---|---|---|---|---|---|
| 1 | Kim Min-seok | South Korea | 153.14 | 1 | 61.73 | 1 | 91.41 |
| 2 | Ryuichi Kihara | Japan | 134.60 | 2 | 49.63 | 2 | 84.97 |
| 3 | Cameron Hems | New Zealand | 90.88 | 4 | 28.77 | 3 | 62.11 |
| 4 | Simon Hardy | Australia | 86.56 | 3 | 33.23 | 5 | 53.33 |
| 5 | Bradley McLachlan | Australia | 84.82 | 5 | 27.96 | 4 | 56.86 |
| 6 | Christopher Boyd | New Zealand | 68.80 | 6 | 21.05 | 6 | 47.75 |

=== Ladies ===
| Rank | Name | Nation | Total points | SP | | FS | |
|---|---|---|---|---|---|---|---|
| 1 | Kim Hyeon-jeong | South Korea | 106.12 | 1 | 43.72 | 2 | 62.40 |
| 2 | Jaimee Nobbs | Australia | 103.09 | 2 | 38.84 | 1 | 64.25 |
| 3 | Chantelle Kerry | Australia | 91.41 | 3 | 35.32 | 3 | 56.09 |
| 4 | Sam Waugh | New Zealand | 76.50 | 6 | 24.05 | 4 | 52.45 |
| 5 | Sydnee Knight | Australia | 76.35 | 4 | 30.46 | 5 | 45.89 |
| 6 | Ariel Nadas | New Zealand | 66.63 | 5 | 26.37 | 6 | 40.26 |
| 7 | Jessica Skinner | South Africa | 54.41 | 7 | 20.09 | 7 | 34.32 |
| 8 | Melissa Morris | New Zealand | 52.95 | 8 | 19.44 | 8 | 33.51 |

== Novice results ==
=== Boys ===
| Rank | Name | Nation | Total points | SP | | FS | |
|---|---|---|---|---|---|---|---|
| 1 | Lee Dong-won | South Korea | 138.08 | 1 | 48.11 | 1 | 89.97 |
| 2 | Oliver Porter | Australia | 99.90 | 2 | 38.30 | 2 | 61.60 |
| 3 | Harley Dahlstrom | Australia | 81.36 | 3 | 30.96 | 3 | 50.40 |

=== Girls ===
| Rank | Name | Nation | Total points | SP | | FS | |
|---|---|---|---|---|---|---|---|
| 1 | Park So-youn | South Korea | 107.43 | 1 | 44.50 | 1 | 62.93 |
| 2 | Madelaine Parker | New Zealand | 80.11 | 2 | 30.59 | 3 | 49.52 |
| 3 | Taylor Dean | Australia | 78.11 | 4 | 26.94 | 2 | 51.17 |
| 4 | Maho Fujita | Australia | 74.89 | 3 | 28.93 | 4 | 45.96 |
| 5 | Jessie Park | New Zealand | 67.52 | 5 | 26.37 | 6 | 41.15 |
| 6 | Kassidy-Rae Browell | Australia | 66.55 | 6 | 24.85 | 5 | 41.70 |
| 7 | Meredith Potgieter | South Africa | 63.10 | 7 | 22.19 | 7 | 40.91 |
| WD | Christina Floka | New Zealand | | | | | |

- WD = Withdrawn
