= 2019 Czech Mixed Doubles Curling Championship =

- Host city: Prague
- Dates: February 1–3, 2019
- Winner: Zbraslav H (Zuzana Paulová / Tomáš Paul)
- Finalist: Savona 1 (Petra Vinšová / Lukáš Klíma)

The 2019 Czech Mixed Doubles Curling Championship (Czech: MČR mixed doubles 2019) was held in Prague from February 1 to 3, 2019.

Six teams took part in the championship, with the top three teams promoted to the playoffs which involved a best of three semifinal and final.

The winners of the championship were team "Zbraslav H" (Zuzana Paulová / Tomáš Paul), who beat team "Savona 1" (Petra Vinšová / Lukáš Klíma) in the final. The bronze medal was won by team "Savona M" (Eva Miklíková / Dalibor Miklík).

The championship team represented the Czech Republic at the 2019 World Mixed Doubles Curling Championship, where they finished fifth.

== Teams ==
Team	Woman	Man
1.CK Brno	Linda Klímová	Jakub Bareš
Dion CÉLINE	Michaela Baudyšová	Kryštof Krupanský
Dion JB	Alžběta Baudyšová	Jan Zelingr
Savona 1	Petra Vinšová	Lukáš Klíma
Savona M	Eva Miklíková	Dalibor Miklík
Zbraslav H	Zuzana Paulová	Tomáš Paul

== Round Robin ==
Key
Teams to Playoffs

	Team	1	2	3	4	5	6	Wins	Losses	DSC, cm	Place
1	1.CK Brno (Klímová / Bareš)	*	9:4	8:3	2:8	3:7	8:12	2	3	27.4	4
2	Dion CÉLINE (Baudyšová M. / Krupanský)	4:9	*	9:3	5:6	5:7	1:8	1	4	53.7	5
3	Dion JB (Baudyšová A. / Zelingr)	3:8	3:9	*	5:11	L	1:7	0	5	94.5	6
4	Savona 1 (Vinšová / Klíma)	8:2	6:5	11:5	*	8:3	5:6	4	1	18.0	2
5	Savona M (Miklíková / Miklík)	7:3	7:5	W	3:8	*	5:9	3	2	70.6	3
6	Zbraslav H (Paulová / Paul)	12:8	8:1	7:1	6:5	9:5	*	5	0	16.8	1

== Playoffs ==
Semifinal			Final
			1	Zbraslav H (Paulová / Paul)	7	8	–
2	Savona 1 (Vinšová / Klíma)	9	2	Savona 1 (Vinšová / Klíma)	4	2	–
3	Savona M (Miklíková / Miklík)	2

=== Semifinal ===
February 2, 17:00 UTC+1

Team	1	2	3	4	5	6	7	8	Final
Savona M (Miklíková / Miklík)	0	0	1	0	1	0	X	X	2
Savona 1 (Vinšová / Klíma) 🔨	3	1	0	1	0	4	X	X	9

=== Final 1 ===
February 3, 9:00 UTC+1

Team	1	2	3	4	5	6	7	8	Final
Savona 1 (Vinšová / Klíma)	0	1	1	2	0	0	0	0	4
Zbraslav H (Paulová / Paul) 🔨	2	0	0	0	1	1	1	2	7

=== Final 2 ===
February 3, 13:00 UTC+1

Team	1	2	3	4	5	6	7	8	Final
Zbraslav H (Paulová / Paul)	2	1	0	2	0	2	1	X	8
Savona 1 (Vinšová / Klíma) 🔨	0	0	1	0	1	0	0	X	2

== Final standings ==
Place	Team	Woman	Man	Games	Wins	Losses	DSC, cm
1st place, gold medalist(s)	Zbraslav H	Zuzana Paulová	Tomáš Paul	6	6	0	
2nd place, silver medalist(s)	Savona 1	Petra Vinšová	Lukáš Klíma	7	5	2	
3rd place, bronze medalist(s)	Savona M	Eva Miklíková	Dalibor Miklík	6	3	3	
4	1.CK Brno	Linda Klímová	Jakub Bareš	5	2	3	27.4
5	Dion CÉLINE	Michaela Baudyšová	Kryštof Krupanský	5	1	4	53.7
6	Dion JB	Alžběta Baudyšová	Jan Zelingr	5	0	5	94.5

== See also ==
- 2019 Czech Women's Curling Championship
