= 2009 New Zealand Winter Games =

Multi-sport event in New Zealand

- Nations: 41
- Athletes: 816
- Sport: 7
- Events: 51
- Opening: 21 August 2009
- Closing: 30 August 2009

The 2009 New Zealand Winter Games was a multi-sport event that was held in the Otago region of New Zealand. It was the inaugural New Zealand Winter Games and was organised by the Winter Games New Zealand Trust. Approximately 816 athletes from 41 nations participated in 51 event in seven disciplines.

Canada won the Team Trophy through points accumulated through the medals won during the games. The United States finished second and Japan third. The hosts, New Zealand finished in sixth place.

== Venues ==
The venues for the 2009 New Zealand Winter Games were held around four locations in the Otago region – Queenstown, Wānaka and Naseby. The Alpine skiing events were situated at Coronet Peak, which is just outside Queenstown. Outside Wānaka the cross-country skiing events were held at the Snow Farm ski area. The freestyle skiing and snowboarding events were split across three venues – The Remarkables, Cardrona Alpine Resort and the Queenstown Resort College. The curling events were held at the Maniototo Curling Rink in Naseby and both the figure skating and ice hockey was held at the Dunedin Ice Stadium.

== Participating nations ==
A total of 816 athletes and 295 management staff represented 41 countries at the 2009 New Zealand Winter Games.

- Andorra (AND)
- Argentina (ARG)
- Australia (AUS)
- Austria (AUT)
- Bahamas (BAH)
- Belgium (BEL)
- Brazil (BRA)
- Canada (CAN)
- Czech Republic (CZE)
- China (CHN)
- Chinese Taipei (TPE)
- Estonia (EST)
- Finland (FIN)
- France (FRA)
- Great Britain (GBR)
- Germany (GER)
- Hungary (HUN)
- Iceland (ISL)
- India (IND)
- Ireland (IRL)
- Italy (ITA)
- Japan (JPN)
- South Korea (KOR)
- Mexico (MEX)
- Monaco (MON)
- Netherlands (NED)
- New Zealand (NZL)
- Norway (NOR)
- Peru (PER)
- Poland (POL)
- Portugal (POR)
- Russia (RUS)
- Serbia (SRB)
- Slovenia (SLO)
- South Africa (RSA)
- Spain (ESP)
- Sweden (SWE)
- Switzerland (SUI)
- Ukraine (UKR)
- United States (USA)
- Venezuela (VEN)

== Sports Events ==
Seven winter sports events were included in the 2009 New Zealand Winter Games. The alpine skiing consisted of 16 events. The events include slalom, giant slalom, super G, with both men and women's events. There are also International Paralympic Committee (IPC) adaptive events for the giant slalom and slalom for men and women in the three categories of sitting, standing, and visually impaired. The alpine skiing was originally meant to include an adaptive Super G category but it was cancelled due to weather.

The cross-country skiing consisted of 15 events. The men's events included a 15 km classic, a sprint freestyle and a 10 km freestyle. The women's events included a 10 km classic, a sprint freestyle and a 5 km freestyle. The IPC events included a 10 km event, a sprint event, a skate event, and a classic event for both men and women in the categories of sitting and standing. The freestyle skiing consisted of five events including slopestyle, halfpipe, with both men and women's events, and a men's big air event. The freestyle skiing was also meant to include ski cross but it was cancelled due to weather.

The snowboarding consisted of five events including slopestyle, snowboard cross, halfpipe, with both men and women's events, and a men's big air event. A women's big air event was also meant to be included but was also cancelled due to weather. The curling included two events, one for men and one for women, while the ice hockey consisted of just one event with Australia competing against New Zealand. Figure skating included six events for both men and women across the categories of junior, novice, and senior.

There were two demonstrative sports at the 2009 New Zealand Winter Games. Winter triathlon and an open men's and an open women's event, and the natural luge consisted of a junior men's and a junior women's event.

Numbers in parentheses indicate the number of medal events contested in each sport.

- Alpine skiing (16)
- Cross-country skiing (15)
- Curling (2)
- Figure skating (6)
- Freestyle skiing (5)
- Ice hockey (1)
- Snowboarding (5)

== Medal table ==
Seventeen of the 41 countries that participated in the games won medals. Canada topped the medal table with ten golds, beating Japan only with the number of silver medals it attained. Canada also won the Team Trophy which is decided based points accumulated according to medals won. The United States and Japan finished second and third, respectively. The hosts finished sixth in both the medal table and the Team Trophy standings.

* Host nation (New Zealand)

Rank	Nation	Gold	Silver	Bronze	Total
1	Canada (CAN)	10	14	9	33
2	Japan (JPN)	10	3	9	22
3	United States (USA)	7	7	6	20
4	Germany (GER)	7	2	1	10
5	Australia (AUS)	6	6	6	18
6	New Zealand (NZL)*	4	6	4	14
7	South Korea (KOR)	4	1	2	7
8	Sweden (SWE)	1	4	1	6
9	Switzerland (SUI)	1	2	1	4
10	China (CHN)	1	2	0	3
11	France (FRA)	1	0	1	2
12	Great Britain (GBR)	0	1	3	4
13	Netherlands (NED)	0	1	1	2
14	Czech Republic (CZE)	0	1	0	1
14	Poland (POL)	0	1	0	1
16	Monaco (MON)	0	0	1	1
16	Norway (NOR)	0	0	1	1
Totals (17 entries)		52	51	46	149
