= Ricky Cockerill =

New Zealand figure skater (born 1978)

Personal information
- Full name: Ricky Cockerill
- Born: 26 October 1978 (age 47) Dunedin, New Zealand
- Home town: Auckland, New Zealand
- Height: 1.70 m (5 ft 7 in)

Figure skating career
- Country: New Zealand
- Discipline: Men's singles
- Retired: 2005

Medal record
New Zealand Championships
| Gold medal – first place | 1998–99 | Singles |
| Gold medal – first place | 1999–2000 Queestown | Singles |
| Gold medal – first place | 2000–01 Auckland | Singles |
| Gold medal – first place | 2001–02 Christchurch | Singles |
| Gold medal – first place | 2002–03 Gore | Singles |
| Gold medal – first place | 2003–04 Auckland | Singles |
| Gold medal – first place | 2004–05 Queenstown | Singles |

Ricky Cockerill (born 26 October 1978) is a New Zealand former competitive figure skater. He is a seven-time New Zealand national champion and competed in the free skate at five Four Continents Championships.

== Life and career ==
Cockerill was born on 26 October 1978 in Dunedin, New Zealand, and was educated at Otago Boys' High School.

Cockerill trained as a figure skater in Auckland, New Zealand; Sydney, Australia; and Moscow, Russia. He represented New Zealand in a number of international competitions including three world championships and five Four Continents Championships.

== Competitive highlights ==
Competition placements since the 1994–95 season
| Season | 1994–95 | 1995–96 | 1998–99 | 1999–2000 | 2000–01 | 2001–02 | 2002–03 | 2003–04 | 2004–05 |
|---|---|---|---|---|---|---|---|---|---|
| World Championships | | | | 39th | 41st | | | | 40th |
| Four Continents Championships | | | 14th | 17th | 18th | | 16th | | 12th |
| World Junior Championships | | 31st | | | | | | | |
| New Zealand Championships | | | 1st | 1st | 1st | 1st | 1st | 1st | 1st |
| Golden Spin of Zagreb | | | 13th | 13th | 18th | 24th | | | |
| Piruetten | | | 10th | | | | | | |
