= Dwayne Li =

New Zealand figure skater (born 2008)

Yanhao Li
Personal information
- Native name: 李彦皞 (Chinese)
- Full name: Yanhao Li
- Other names: Dwayne Li
- Born: 12 August 2008 (age 18) Beijing, China
- Home town: Auckland, New Zealand
- Height: 1.75 m (5 ft 9 in)

Figure skating career
- Country: New Zealand
- Discipline: Men's singles
- Coach: Bess Cao
- Skating club: Allegro Ice Dance Club
- Began skating: 2012

Medal record
New Zealand Championships
Gold medal – first place	2025 Auckland	Singles
Gold medal – first place	2026 Gore	Singles
Winter Youth Olympics
Bronze medal – third place	2024 Gangneung	Singles

Yanhao "Dwayne" Li (simplified Chinese: 李彦皞; traditional Chinese: 李彥皞; pinyin: Li Yànhào; born 12 August 2008) is a Chinese-born New Zealand figure skater. He is the 2024 Youth Olympic bronze medalist, six-time ISU Junior Grand Prix medalist, and a two-tiime New Zealand national champion (2025-2026).

He is the first New Zealand figure skater to qualify for or medal at any Olympic event and to win an ISU Junior Grand Prix medal.

== Personal life ==
Li was born on August 12, 2008 in Beijing, China. At the age of eight, his father's work required the family to move to New Zealand, settling in Auckland. Li is bilingual and able to communicate in Mandarin and English fluently. As of 2026, he is a university student at the University of Auckland

In addition to figure skating, Li can also play the clarinet.

== Career ==
=== Early years ===
Li began skating as a four-year-old in China, to escape the summer heat. After arriving in New Zealand at age eight, he joined the Allegro Ice Dance Club and Bess Cao became his coach. He trains at Paradice ice rinks in Botany and Avondale. Commenting on the sport, he said, "I love the feeling of weightlessness when I'm jumping on ice. I really enjoy the rush of wind when picking up speed."

=== 2022–23 season: Junior international debut ===
Li made his international debut in the SEA Open trophy in Singapore, where he finished second. He then made his ISU Junior Grand Prix debut at 2022 JGP Latvia, where he finished sixteenth. He went on to compete on the junior level at the 2022–23 New Zealand Championships, winning the gold medal. Selected to compete at the 2023 World Junior Championships in Calgary, Alberta, Li placed twenty-sixth in the short program and did not advance to the free skate segment of the competition.

=== 2023–24 season: Youth Olympic bronze ===
Li began the season by competing on the junior level of the 2023 Asian Open Trophy, taking the silver medal. Competing on the 2023–24 Junior Grand Prix series, Li took the bronze medal at the 2023 JGP Thailand with a score of 210.08, beating his previous personal best total score by almost sixty points. This was the first ever Junior Grand Prix medal won for New Zealand. He later finished in fifth place at 2023 JGP Japan three weeks later.

At the 2023–24 New Zealand Championships, Li won the junior national title for the second consecutive time.

In January 2024, Li competed in the men's singles event at the 2024 Winter Youth Olympics in Gangneung, South Korea. He placed fourth in the short program, despite suffering a nosebleed midway through the program, which he said had "happened quite a few times before in training, so I just pushed on and finished my routine. It was actually pretty funny." In the free skate, he decided to attempt a triple Axel, and landed the jump, despite a step-out on the landing. Li said afterward that it "was the first time I'd ever done a triple Axel in competition and I was really pleased to stay on my feet." Although fourth in both segments, his total score was third highest, winning the bronze medal. He made history taking New Zealand's first Olympic medal in figure skating, and was one of four New Zealand athletes to win a medal at the 2024 Youth Olympics. After his medal success, he stated: "I was really proud of myself for being here and performing in front of such a big crowd." Li remarked as well that the "Youth Olympic Games used to be a dream. Now I can say it's reality. This is very special to me." Li finished the season at the 2024 World Junior Championships in Taipei, where he came twelfth.

=== 2024–25 season ===
Li started the season by competing on the junior level at the 2024 Cranberry Cup, where he won the junior men's event with a score of 230.54. He went on to compete on the 2024–25 Junior Grand Prix circuit, winning gold at 2024 JGP Thailand and defeating reigning World Junior silver medalist, Rio Nakata. He achieved new personal best scores in both the short (83.25), and free program (146.84), with a total score of 230.09. Li made history as the first figure skater from New Zealand to ever win gold at a Junior Grand Prix event. He called the result "an inspiration to all the skaters in New Zealand. Currently we have a lot of upcoming skaters so I feel like this could be a way to inspire them to improve and to aim higher." He would go on to take the bronze medal at 2024 JGP China behind Nakata and Tian Tonghe of China. Li's results on the Junior Grand Prix guaranteed him a spot at the 2024–25 Junior Grand Prix Final, becoming the first skater from New Zealand to qualify for a Grand Prix Figure Skating Final.

At the Junior Grand Prix Final in Grenoble, France, Li would place fourth in the short program and fifth in the free skate, finishing the event in fifth place overall. Following his free skate, Li said, "I felt pretty shaky out there. I learned that it is all mental. I will have to work on that. I really enjoyed my first JGP experience a lot especially having this competition together with the Seniors. I got really inspired by watching all their practices. I love Yuma’s skating skills and Ilia’s quads. I am looking forward to see them skate tonight."

In late February, Li competed at the 2025 World Junior Championships in Debrecen, Hungary, where he finished in tenth place. “I know that for me, it's all mental," he said after the free skate. "It's been a long and hard season, so I really want to take some rest now."

=== 2025–26 season ===
Li began the season by competing on the junior level at the 2025 Cranberry Cup, where he won the gold medal for a second consecutive time. A couple weeks later, he began competing on the Junior Grand Prix circuit. He finished fifth at 2025 JGP Latvia.

In March, Li competed at the 2026 World Junior Championships where he finished in eighth place overall. "I am actually looking forward to competing in seniors," he said of next season. "I definitely want to focus mainly on seniors. Maybe that also brings a different mindset. And also with the new rules, like the changes in jumps and everything, that is pretty exciting. I will keep the short program. For the free skate it is not decided yet, but I do want to focus a little more on technique."

=== 2026–2027 season: Junior Grand Prix Silvers ===
Li opened his season at the 2026 JGP China, where he won the silver medal behind Lev Lazarev. In his second Junior Grand Prix assignment in Thailand, he place first in the short program but spun out on the triple Axel leading him to place second thus qualifying for the Junior Grand Prix Final in Chongqing. He earned new ISU personal bests in the short and free skate segments of the competition.

Afterwards, he entered the Swan Trophy in Australia where he led in both segments and won overall.

== Programs ==
Season	Short programme	Free skating	Exhibition
2026–2027	Extremely Loud & Incredibly Close; Extremely Loud And Incredibly Close; Piano Lesson With Grandma by Alexandre Desplat & Jean-Yves Thibaudet choreo. by Bess Cao	Earned It; Blinding Lights by The Weeknd choreo. by Bess Cao	
2025–2026	Extremely Loud & Incredibly Close; Extremely Loud And Incredibly Close; Piano Lesson With Grandma by Alexandre Desplat & Jean-Yves Thibaudet choreo. by Bess Cao	Les Misérables by Claude-Michel Schönberg; Prologue (Look Down) performed by Bournemouth Symphony Orchestra & Seann Alderking; I Dreamed a Dream performed by Karl Loxley choreo. by Bess Cao	
2024–2025	Supreme by Robbie Williams choreo. by Bess Cao	Earned It by The Weeknd; Funny by Nadim Naaman choreo. by Bess Cao	
2023–2024	Supreme by Robbie Williams choreo. by Bess Cao	Garde Confiance by The Little Singers of Paris & Romaric Laurence choreo. by Bess Cao	That's Life by Frank Sinatra choreo. by Bess Cao
2022–2023	Supreme by Robbie Williams choreo. by Bess Cao; That's Life by Frank Sinatra choreo. by Bess Cao	Garde Confiance by The Little Singers of Paris & Romaric Laurence choreo. by Bess Cao	

== Competitive highlights ==
- TBD – Assigned
- WD – Withdrew from competition

Competition placements at senior level
Season	2025–26	2026–27
New Zealand Championships	1st	1st
Swan Trophy		1st

Competition placements at junior level
Season	2022–23	2023–24	2024–25	2025–26	2026–27
Winter Youth Olympics		3rd			
World Junior Championships	26th	12th	10th	8th	2nd
Junior Grand Prix Final			5th		TBD
JGP China			3rd		2nd
JGP Japan		5th			
JGP Latvia	16th			5th	
JGP Thailand		3rd	1st	3rd	2nd
Asian Open		2nd			
Cranberry Cup			1st	1st	
Hollins Trophy	1st				
Oceania International	1st				
SEA Open	2nd				
Tallink Hotels Cup				1st	

== Detailed results ==
ISU personal best scores in the +5/-5 GOE System
Segment	Type	Score	Event
Total	**TSS**	**244.68**	2026 JGP Thailand
Short program	**TSS**	**86.65**	2026 JGP Thailand
Short program	TES	48.37	2026 JGP Thailand
Short program	PCS	38.28	2026 JGP Thailand
Free skating	**TSS**	**158.03**	2026 JGP Thailand
Free skating	TES	79.48	2026 JGP Thailand
Free skating	PCS	78.55	2026 JGP Thailand

=== Senior level ===
- Small medals for the short program and free skating are only awarded at ISU Championships.
- ISU Personal Bests highlighted in **bold**.

Results in the 2025–26 season
Date	Event	SP		FS		Total	
Date	Event	P	Score	P	Score	P	Score
Oct 4–7, 2025	2025 New Zealand Championships	1	83.20	1	110.57	1	193.77

Results in the 2026–27 season
Date	Event	SP		FS		Total	
Date	Event	P	Score	P	Score	P	Score
Sep 27–30, 2026	(Australia) 2026 Swan Trophy International	1	89.68	1	160.71	1	250.39
Oct 29 – Nov 1, 2026	2026 New Zealand Championships	1	60.83	1	136.66	1	197.49

=== Junior level ===
Results in the 2022-23 season
Date	Event	SP		FS		Total	
Date	Event	P	Score	P	Score	P	Score
Sep 2 – 4, 2022	(Singapore) 2022 South East Asian Open Trophy	2	61.51	2	114.33	2	175.84
Sep 7 – 10, 2022	2022 JGP Latvia	14	54.00	16	97.54	16	151.54
Oct 18 – 21, 2022	2022-23 New Zealand Championships (Junior)	1	60.82	1	123.26	1	184.08
Feb 17 – Mar 5, 2023	(Bulgaria) 2018 World Junior Championships	26	57.88	—N/a	—N/a	26	57.88
May 15 – 17, 2023	(New Zealand) 2023 Oceania International	1	64.20	1	126.46	1	190.69
June 9 – 12, 2023	(Australia) 2023 Hollins Trophy International	1	60.05	1	124.98	1	185.03

Results in the 2023-24 season
Date	Event	SP		FS		Total	
Date	Event	P	Score	P	Score	P	Score
Aug 16 – 19, 2023	(Thailand) 2023 Asian Open Trophy	1	65.24	2	109.09	2	174.33
Aug 23 – 26, 2023	2023 JGP Thailand	4	72.28	3	137.80	3	210.08
Sep 13 – 16, 2023	2023 JGP Japan	4	71.39	7	124.41	5	195.80
Oct 7 – 10, 2023	2023-24 New Zealand Championships (Junior)	1	73.51	1	135.18	1	208.69
Jan 27 – 29, 2024	(South Korea) 2024 Winter Youth Olympics	4	68.01	4	140.83	3	208.84
Feb 26 – Mar 3, 2024	(Taiwan) 2018 World Junior Championships	23	62.84	8	134.63	12	197.47

Results in the 2024-25 season
Date	Event	SP		FS		Total	
Date	Event	P	Score	P	Score	P	Score
Aug 8 – 11, 2024	(United States) 2024 Cranberry Cup International	1	77.44	1	153.10	1	230.54
Sep 11 – 14, 2024	2022 JGP Thailand	1	83.25	1	146.84	1	230.09
Oct 9 – 12, 2024	2024 JGP China	2	76.10	5	130.35	3	206.45
Oct 17 – 20, 2024	2024-25 New Zealand Championships (Junior)	1	78.70	1	149.69	1	228.39
Dec 5 – 8, 2024	(France) 2024-25 Junior Grand Prix Final	4	72.17	5	129.46	5	201.63
Feb 25 – Mar 2, 2025	(Bulgaria) 2025 World Junior Championships	10	72.96	9	142.89	10	215.85

Results in the 2025-26 season
Date	Event	SP		FS		Total	
Date	Event	P	Score	P	Score	P	Score
Aug 7 – 11, 2025	(United States) 2024 Cranberry Cup International	1	79.46	1	144.86	1	224.32
Aug 20 – 23, 2025	2025 JGP Latvia	3	78.18	9	127.33	5	205.51
Sep 9 – 13, 2025	2025 JGP Thailand	2	77.15	3	135.14	3	210.29
Feb 19 – 22, 2026	(Estonia) 2026 Tallink Hotels Cup	2	67.75	1	147.52	1	215.27

Results in the 2026-27 season
Date	Event	SP		FS		Total	
Date	Event	P	Score	P	Score	P	Score
Aug 20 – 22, 2026	2026 JGP China	2	83.59	2	147.30	2	230.89
Sep 3 – 5, 2026	2026 JGP Thailand	1	**86.65**	2	**158.03**	2	**244.68**
Dec 10 – 13, 2026	(China) 2026-27 Junior Grand Prix Final	TBD	—N/a	TBD	—N/a	TBD	—N/a
