= Olena Pazderska =

Ukrainian curler

- Curler

Curling career
- Member Association: Ukraine
- World Mixed Doubles Championship: 1 (2019)
Medal record
Curling

Olena Pazderska (Ukrainian: Оле́на Пазде́рська) is a Ukrainian curler.

== Teams and events ==
=== Mixed doubles ===
Season	Male	Female	Coach	Events
2018–19	Yevhen Stadnyk	Olena Pazderska	Dean Roth	WMDCC 2019 (45th)

== Personal life ==
Olena Pazderska curled in New Jersey, United States. She was part of the first-ever Ukrainian national curling team and made their debut at the 2019 World Mixed Doubles Championship.
