= Morgan Figgins =

New Zealand figure skater

Personal information
- Born: 29 March 1992 (age 34)
- Height: 1.62 m (5 ft 4 in)

Figure skating career
- Country: New Zealand
- Coach: Fanis Shakirizianu
- Skating club: Auckland Ice Figure Skating

Morgan Figgins (born 29 March 1992 in Auckland, New Zealand) is a New Zealand figure skater. She is a five time New Zealand national champion and a four time New Zealand junior national champion. She was the youngest New Zealand skater to skate in the senior division at age 12 when she won her first senior title, and the youngest to skate and obtain the junior title at age 11. She currently resides in Dunedin, New Zealand, and coaches part-time at the Dunedin ice rink.

== Competitive highlights ==
- JGP: Junior Grand Prix

=== Singles ===
International
Event	03–04	04–05	05–06	06–07	07–08	08–09	09–10	10–11	11–12
Worlds					52nd				
Four Continents					27th				
NZ Winter Games						5th		2nd	
International: Junior
Junior Worlds				33rd					
JGP Bulgaria				27th					
JGP U.K.					26th				
AYOF				8th					
National
New Zealand Champ.		1st J	1st	1st	1st	2nd	2nd	2nd	1st
Australian Champ.	4th J	7th J		4th					

=== Pairs with Howie ===
National
Event	08–09
New Zealand Champ.	1st J
Australian Champ.	1st J
