= Manorburn Dam =

Lake in Central Otago, New Zealand

- Location of Manorburn Dam in New Zealand
- Interactive map of Manorburn Dam
- Location: Central Otago, New Zealand
- Coordinates: 45°14′26.95″S 169°26′44.75″E
- Primary inflows: Manor Burn
- Primary outflows: Manor Burn
- Basin countries: New Zealand
- Built: early 1900s

Manorburn Dam is a lake in the Central Otago district of the South Island of New Zealand, 3.5 kilometres (2.2 mi) east of Alexandra. Its outflow, the Manor Burn, connects with the Manuherikia River just to the northeast of the town.

The dam is also known as the Lower Manorburn Dam, as its inflow, also the Manor Burn, runs 25 kilometres (16 mi) northwest to it from the 700-hectare (1,700-acre) irrigation storage reservoirs Manorburn Reservoir, or the Upper Manorburn Dam, and Greenland Reservoir. Surrounded by schist tors, the lake is a popular spot for Alexandra's recreational activities. As determined by the Central Otago District Council, the lake is part of the 76-hectare (190-acre) Manorburn Dam Recreation Reserve.

== History ==
Manorburn Dam was initially constructed as an irrigation dam in the early 1900s. In February 1958, it was declared that the lake would be for irrigation purposes only, but by June of the same year it was declared to have the second purpose of recreational activity. In 1979, it was officially grouped as a recreation reserve, subject to the Reserves Act 1977. Until the Ice Inline Sports Complex was built in Alexandra's Molyneux Park in 1993, it was the most popular ice skating location in the area, but still sees use today.

== Activities ==
As one of the most often frozen lakes in New Zealand, Manorburn Dam is popular for ice skating in the winter. Boating is prohibited in the Manorburn, but fishing, swimming, walking, and kayaking are common activities in the area. A 4.6-mile (7.4 km) walking track passes by the lake. The lake is also a curling venue, and bonspiels are regular events in colder winters. The local curling club boasts that it is the largest outdoor curling venue in the Southern Hemisphere.
