= 2015 New Zealand Winter Games =

Multi-sport event in New Zealand

- Events: 35
- Opening: 21 August 2015
- Closing: 30 August 2015

The 2015 New Zealand Winter Games was the 4th edition of the New Zealand Winter Gameswas contested August 21 through August 30 in the cities of Naseby, Queenstown, and Wānaka. A total of 35 events across 5 disciplines will be contested, as well as a night parallel slalom to be contested during the opening ceremony. The event is officially called the Audi quattro Wintergames.

== Venues ==
All venues were located within the Otago region of New Zealand. Alpine skiing will be contested within Coronet Peak in Queenstown. Cross country skiing will take place at the Snow Farm in Wānaka. Curling will be held in the Naseby Curling Rink, or the Maniototo Curling International within Naseby. Both freestyle skiing and snowboarding will be held at the Cardrona Alpine Resort near Wānaka.

== Sports ==
Five winter sports will be contested throughout the duration of the games. This is an increase from the total number of events from the 2011 New Zealand Winter Games.

Alpine skiing will be made up of the giant slalom, slalom, IPC giant slalom, and IPC slalom, all of which will feature both men's and women's events for a total of 16. Additionally, a night parallel slalom will be contested on the 21st during the opening ceremonies with the winners receiving $15,000.

Cross-country skiing will include the events of 15 km Mass Start Classic and 10 km Individual Freestyle for men, the 10 km Mass Start Classic and 5 km Individual Freestyle for women, as well as the sprint for both genders. A total of 6 events will be contested within the discipline.

Curling will only feature one event, the curling mixed doubles. It will include a 2-person team made up of one man and one woman. The event was recently added onto the Winter Olympic program, and this will most likely serve as an important testing event for the sport.

Freestyle skiing will feature big air (or aerials) as well as halfpipe and slopestyle. The halfpipe and slopestyle will both be a part of the 2016 Freestyle Skiing World Cup. All events will feature both a male and female version for a total of 6 events.

Snowboarding will include big air, halfpipe, and slopestyle. Big air was also recently added onto the Winter Olympic Program, so this will likely serve as an important test event. The halfpipe and slopestyle events are part of the 2016 Snowboarding World Cup. All events will include a male and female version for a total of 6 events.

== Medalists ==
Men's Alpine Skiing

Event	Gold	Silver	Bronze
Night Slalom: Parallel	(United States) Ted Ligety	(United States) David Chodounsky	(United States) AJ Ginnis (Switzerland) Simon Steimle
Giant Slalom	(Slovakia) Adam Žampa	(Austria) Manuel Feller	(United States) Brennan Rubie
Slalom	(Slovakia) Adam Žampa	(Austria) Marco Schwarz	(Switzerland) Marc Gini
IPC Giant Slalom; Standing	(Australia) Mitchell Gourley	(United States) James Stanton	(United Kingdom) James Whitley
IPC Giant Slalom; Sitting	(South Korea) Sang Min Han	(United States) Joshua Elliot	(South Korea) Chi Won Lee
IPC Slalom; Standing	(New Zealand) Adam Hall	(Australia) Mitchell Gourley	(United States) James Stanton
IPC Slalom; Sitting	(United States) Tyler Walker	(New Zealand) Corey Peters	(South Korea) Min Sang Han
IPC Slalom; Visually Impaired	(Australia) Patrick Jensen, Guide: Kirsty O'Sullivan	not awarded	not awarded

Women's Alpine Skiing

Event	Gold	Silver	Bronze
Night Slalom: Parallel	(United States) Mikaela Shiffrin	(United States) Paula Moltzan	(United States) Nina O'Brien (Norway) Kristin Gjelsten Haugen
Giant Slalom	(Austria) Chiara Mair	(Norway) Lotte Smiseth Sejersted	(Norway) Kristine Fausa Aasberg
Slalom	(Austria) Katharina Truppe	(Austria) Ricarda Haaser	(Austria) Elisabeth Kappaurer
IPC Giant Slalom; Standing	(United States) Melanie Schwartz	(United States) Stephanie Jallen	not awarded
IPC Giant Slalom; Sitting	(United States) Laurie Stephens	not awarded	not awarded
IPC Giant Slalom; Visually Impaired	(South Korea) Jae Rim Yang, Guide: Un So Ri Ko	(United States) Danelle Umstead, Guide: Rob Umstead	not awarded
IPC Slalom; Standing	(United States) Melanie Schwartz	(United States) Stephanie Jallen	not awarded
IPC Slalom; Sitting	(United States) Laurie Stephens	not awarded	not awarded
IPC Slalom; Visually Impaired	(South Korea) Jae Rim Yang, Guide: Un So Ri Ko	(United States) Danelle Umstead, Guide: Rob Umstead	not awarded

Men's Cross Country Skiing

Event	Gold	Silver	Bronze
Sprint Classic	(South Korea) Eun-Ho Kim	(South Korea) Jun-Ho Hwang	(Canada) William Poffenrorth
15 km Mass Start Classic	(South Korea) Jun Ho Hwang	(South Korea) Seong-Beom Park	(South Korea) Eun-Ho Kim
10 km Individual Freestyle	(South Korea) Seong-Beom Park	(New Zealand) Andrew Pohl	(South Korea) Yong-Jin Cho

Women's Cross Country Skiing

Event	Gold	Silver	Bronze
Sprint Classic	(Canada) Olivia Bouffard-Nesbitt	(Slovenia) Barbara Jezeršek	(Australia) Katerina Paul
10 km Mass Start Classic	(South Korea) Chae-Won Lee	(Slovenia) Barbara Jezeršek	(Canada) Olivia Bouffard-Nesbitt
5 km Individual Freestyle	(Slovenia) Barbara Jezeršek	(South Korea) Chae-Won Lee	(Canada) Olivia Bouffard-Nesbitt

Curling

Event	Gold	Silver	Bronze
Mixed Doubles	(Canada) Kalynn Park & Charley Thomas	(United States) Sarah Anderson & Korey Dropkin	(Finland) Katya Kiiskinen & Paulie Jaamies

Men's Freestyle Skiing

Event	Gold	Silver	Bronze
Big Air	(Switzerland) Andri Ragettli	(Norway) Johan Berg	(Switzerland) Luca Schuler
Halfpipe	(France) Kevin Rolland	(France) Thomas Krief	(France) Benoit Valentin
Slopestyle	(United Kingdom) James Woods	(Norway) Øystein Bråten	(United States) Joss Christensen

Women's Freestyle Skiing

Event	Gold	Silver	Bronze
Big Air	(Germany) Lisa Zimmermann	(Italy) Silvia Bertagna	(Chile) Dominique Ohaco
Halfpipe	(United States) Devin Logan	(New Zealand) Janina Kuzma	(Japan) Ayana Onozuka
Slopestyle	(Norway) Tiril Sjåstad Christiansen	(Italy) Silvia Bertagna	(Germany) Lisa Zimmermann

Men's Snowboarding

Event	Gold	Silver	Bronze
Big Air	(Japan) Keita Inamura	(Japan) Yuki Kadono	(Japan) Tomoki Wakita
Halfpipe	(Japan) Raibu Katayama	(Japan) Taku Hiraoka	(Switzerland) Louri Podladtchikov
Slopestyle	(United States) Chris Corning	(Japan) Yuki Kadono	(Canada) Michael Ciccarelli

Women's Snowboarding

Event	Gold	Silver	Bronze
Big Air	(Japan) Miyabi Onitsuka	(Japan) Natsuki Sato	(Japan) Asami Hirono
Halfpipe	(China) Xuetong Cai	(Japan) Hikaru Ōe	(France) Sophie Rodriguez
Slopestyle	(United States) Jamie Anderson	(Canada) Laurie Blouin	(United States) Hailey Langland

== Medal table ==
The United States claimed the most medals by far, winning 10 gold, 9 silver and 6 bronze for a total of 25; 1/4 of the medals in total awarded. In 2nd was South Korea, with 7 gold, 3 silver and 4 bronze for a total of 14. In 3rd was Japan, with 3 gold, 5 silver and 3 bronze for a total of 11. The host nation, New Zealand, finished in 9th with 1 gold and 3 silver. A total of 18 nations took home at least 1 medal, and 15 nations took home at least 1 gold.

* Host nation (New Zealand)

Rank	Nation	Gold	Silver	Bronze	Total
1	United States (USA)	10	9	6	25
2	South Korea (KOR)	7	3	4	14
3	Japan (JPN)	3	5	3	11
4	Austria (AUT)	2	3	1	6
5	Canada (CAN)	2	1	4	7
6	Australia (AUS)	2	1	1	4
7	Slovakia (SVK)	2	0	0	2
8	Norway (NOR)	1	3	2	6
9	New Zealand (NZL)*	1	3	0	4
10	Slovenia (SLO)	1	2	0	3
11	France (FRA)	1	1	2	4
12	Switzerland (SUI)	1	0	4	5
13	Germany (GER)	1	0	1	2
13	Great Britain (GBR)	1	0	1	2
15	China (CHN)	1	0	0	1
16	Italy (ITA)	0	2	0	2
17	Chile (CHI)	0	0	1	1
17	Finland (FIN)	0	0	1	1
Totals (18 entries)		36	33	31	100
