= Manorburn Reservoir =

Reservoir in New Zealand

Coordinates: 45°22′56.7″S 169°37′3.4″E

Manorburn Reservoir is an irrigation storage reservoir in the Central Otago district of the South Island of New Zealand. Located at the southern end of the Ida Valley, it is 700 hectares (1,700 acres) in area with a shoreline of 14 kilometres (8.7 mi). The reservoir is also known as the Upper Manorburn Dam, as its outflow, the Manor Burn, runs 25 kilometres (16 mi) northwest to the Lower Manorburn Dam. It is connected to the Greenland Reservoir.

The lake has a surface area of approximately 160 hectares (400 acres).

== History ==
In 1913, brown trout were released into the water of Manorburn Reservoir intended for fishing. The reservoir was finished in 1914, and rainbow trout were released into its waters. In 1948, the last brown trout was fished from the reservoir by Bill Leask, weighing 4 kilograms (140 oz). Since then, it has been used as a fishery for rainbow trout.

== Activities ==
It is accessible by Upper Manorburn Road for rainbow trout fishing, between 1 November and 31 May.
