= Scotch doubles (curling) =

Type of curling: two players per team, six stones per end

Scotch doubles is a type of curling played with two players per team and six stones per end per team. Three stones are delivered by each player, with six ends per game. Sweeping is permitted only after the far hog-line. Until two stones have been played (one from each side), stones in the free guard zone (those stones left in the area between the hog and tee lines, excluding the house) may not be removed by an opponent's stone. This term is also used in bowling and cue sports.

== See also ==
- Curling
