= New Zealand Winter Games =

Multi-sport event held every 2 years

Winter Games NZ (WGNZ)
- Genre: Snow Sports Event
- Frequency: Annually
- Country: New Zealand
- Inaugurated: 2009
- Most recent: 2024
- Website: http://wintergamesnz.kiwi/

Winter Games NZ (WGNZ) is the largest snow sports event in the Southern Hemisphere and is held annually in the Southern Lakes District, at Queenstown and Wānaka Ski Areas.

The Games are organised by the Winter Games New Zealand Trust with the support of the Government of New Zealand, Sport and Recreation New Zealand and the New Zealand Olympic Committee.

== History ==
The inaugural New Zealand Winter Games was held in August 2009 in Dunedin, Queenstown, Wānaka, and Naseby, which are all situated in the Otago region of New Zealand. Events included alpine skiing, cross-country skiing, curling, figure skating, freestyle skiing, ice hockey, and snowboarding, as well as two demonstration events of winter triathlon and luge. Canada was the overall winner of the games, with the United States and Japan in second and third respectively.

The second Winter Games were held in August 2011. Methven, which is situated in the Canterbury region, was added as a venue alongside the venues from the previous Games. The number of events was increased from seven to nine. Editions of Winter Games NZ continued to be held every two years, with events in 2013, 2015 and 2017.

In 2018 Winter Games NZ became an annually held event.

=== COVID-19 ===
2020 saw the introduction of a new and innovative team format known as Obsidian. Due to the borders being closed due to the COVID-19 pandemic, Obsidian consisted only of New Zealand athletes and was praised for its athlete-focussed, content-driven vision.

In 2021 Winter Games NZ was cancelled due to the COVID-19 pandemic.

=== Post-COVID ===
2022 saw the return of international athletes to Winter Games NZ, with FIS Australia New Zealand Cup events held across Snowboard and Freeski Park and Pipe at Cardrona Alpine Resort, and Super G, Giant Slalom and Slalom disciplines at Coronet Peak. The North Face Frontier 2* and 4* events were held at The Remarkables Ski Area. Winter Games NZ also held an international invite only Big Air event as a nod to Obsidian.

The 2023 edition of the Winter Games NZ saw the inaugural international Obsidian go down, the four teams representing four corners of the globe competing in Big Air, Park Jam and Backcountry Freestyle. The international Obsidian was held alongside the 2023 FIS Park & Pipe Junior World Championships, FIS ANC Alpine schedule and Freeride 2* and 4* events.

Winter Games NZ 2024 saw the return of FIS Park & Pipe World Cup events to New Zealand snow, the first time since 2019. With a FIS Freeski Halfpipe World Cup and a FIS Snowboard Slopestyle World Cup on the schedule, the best of the best descended on Cardrona to earn valuable qualification points towards the 2026 Milano Cortina Olympic Winter Games.

The FIS ANC Alpine programme was held at Coronet Peak and The North Face Frontier 2* and 4* events were held at Treble Cone and The Remarkables. Cardrona was also the venue for the FIS ANC Snowboard Halfpipe and the FIS ANC Freeski Slopestyle competitions.

== List of Games ==
Year	Hosts	Dates	Nations	Competitors	Sports	Events	Ref
2009; Details	Dunedin, Naseby, Queenstown, Wānaka	21 – 30 August	41	816	7	51	
2011; Details	Dunedin, Methven, Naseby, Queenstown, Wānaka	13 – 28 August	36	887	9	38	
2013; Details	Naseby, Queenstown, Wānaka	15 – 25 August		699	5	13	
2015; Details	Naseby, Queenstown, Wānaka	21 – 30 August		445	5	27	
2017; Details	Naseby, Queenstown, Wānaka	25 August – 10 September	42	846	7		
2018; Details	Naseby, Queenstown, Wānaka	24 August – 8 September			7		
2019	Queenstown, Wānaka	27 August – 11 September			5		
2020	Queenstown, Wānaka				1		
2021	CANCELLED						
2022	Queenstown, Wānaka				4		
2023	Queenstown, Wānaka				4		
2024	Queenstown, Wānaka				4		

== Sponsors and partners ==
The Winter Games has been sponsored by brands such as Sky, The North Face, Forsyth Barr, Skyline, Mediaworks, Red Bull, Audi, Air New Zealand, Asahi and Champagne Mumm.
