= 2019 World Mixed Doubles Curling Championship =

Curling Championship

- Host city: Stavanger, Norway
- Arena: Sørmarka Arena
- Dates: April 20–27, 2019
- Winner: Sweden
- Female: Anna Hasselborg
- Male: Oskar Eriksson
- Coach: Fredrik Lindberg
- Finalist: Canada (Peterman/Gallant)

The 2019 World Mixed Doubles Curling Championship was held in Stavanger, Norway from April 20 to 27, 2019. The event was held in conjunction with the 2019 World Senior Curling Championships. A record forty-eight nations competed in the event, including Kosovo, Mexico, Nigeria, Saudi Arabia, and Ukraine competing in their first World Curling Federation events.

The 2019 edition was the last with open entry. The top sixteen teams in the competition, in addition to qualifying for the playoffs, qualified for the 2020 World Championship. The remaining four spots will be awarded at the new World Mixed Doubles Qualification Event.

== Teams ==
The teams are as follows:

Country	Female	Male	Coach
Australia	Tahli Gill	Dean Hewitt	Pete Manasantivongs
Austria	Hannah Augustin	Martin Reichel	Björn Schröder
Belarus	Tatsiana Tarsunova	Ilya Shalamitski	Vasily Telezhkin
Belgium	Veerle Geerinckx	Dirk Heylen	
Brazil	Luciana Barrella	Marcio Cerquinho	Wade Scoffin
Canada	Jocelyn Peterman	Brett Gallant	Jeff Stoughton
China	Fu Yiwei	Zou Dejia	Zhang Wei, Zhu Yu
Chinese Taipei	Amanda Chou	Brendon Liu	Ting-Li Lin
Croatia	Iva Penava	Dario Vuković	
Czech Republic	Zuzana Paulová	Tomáš Paul	Brad Askew
Denmark	Christine Grønbech	Martin Grønbech	Per Svensen
England	Anna Fowler	Ben Fowler	Greg Drummond
Estonia	Marie Turmann	Harri Lill	Nicole Strausak
Finland	Elina Virtaala	Tomi Rantamäki	Iikko Saentti
France	Manon Humbert	David Baumgartner	Chrislain Razafimahefa
Germany	Pia-Lisa Schöll	Konstantin Kämpf	Uli Kapp
Greece	Eleni Zacharia	Alexandros Arampatzis	Efstratios Kokkinellis
Guyana	Farzana Hussain	Rayad Husain	Jason Perreira
Hong Kong	Ling-Yue Hung	Jason Chang	Rick Collins
Hungary	Dorottya Palancsa	Zsolt Kiss	Zoltan Palancsa
Ireland	Louise Kerr	John Wilson	Peter JD Wilson
Italy	Alice Cobelli	Amos Mosaner	Sören Grahn
Japan	Satsuki Fujisawa	Tsuyoshi Yamaguchi	J. D. Lind
Kazakhstan	Sitora Alliyarova	Abylaikhan Zhuzbay	Viktor Kim
Kosovo	Eldena Dakaj	Peter Andersen	Meriton Zeneli
Latvia	Santa Blumberga	Ritvars Gulbis	Roberts Krusts
Lithuania	Lina Janulevičiūtė	Vytis Kulakauskas	Tadas Vyskupaitis
Mexico	Adriana Camarena	Ramy Cohen	Barry Ivy
Netherlands	Lisenka Bomas	Bob Bomas	Shari Leibbrandt
New Zealand	Bridget Becker	Sean Becker	
Nigeria	Susana Cole	Tijani Cole	Ellery Robichaud, Jeanette Robichaud
Norway	Kristin Skaslien	Magnus Nedregotten	Thomas Løvold
Poland	Zuzanna Rybicka	Bartosz Dzikowski	
Qatar	Mabarka Al-Abdulla	Nasser Al-Yafei	Lajos Belleli
Romania	Iulia Trăilă	Allen Coliban	Camelia Clem
Russia	Anastasia Moskaleva	Alexander Eremin	Vasily Gudin, Vladimir Sobakin
Saudi Arabia	Karrie Al-Aqel	Suleiman Al-Aqel	Alastair Fyfe
Scotland	Gina Aitken	Scott Andrews	Nancy Smith
Slovakia	Silvia Sýkorová	Marek Sýkora	Daniel Sýkora
Slovenia	Ajda Zavrtanik Drglin	Jure Čulić	
South Korea	Jang Hye-ri	Choi Chi-won	Lee Hyein
Spain	Oihane Otaegi	Mikel Unanue	Steffen Walstad
Sweden	Anna Hasselborg	Oskar Eriksson	Fredrik Lindberg
Switzerland	Daniela Rupp	Kevin Wunderlin	Sebastian Stock
Turkey	Dilşat Yıldız	Uğurcan Karagöz	Ahmet Celik
Ukraine	Olena Pazderska	Yevhen Stadnyk	Dean Roth
United States	Cory Christensen	John Shuster	Derek Brown
Wales	Laura Beever	Garry Coombs	Richard Pougher

== Round-robin standings ==
The top two teams in each group qualify for the playoffs.

Final round-robin standings

Key
Teams to playoffs

Group A	W	L	DSC
Sweden	6	1	17.80
Canada	6	1	22.85
Japan	6	1	34.07
Denmark	3	4	55.09
Belarus	3	4	68.05
Romania	3	4	114.18
Hong Kong	1	6	59.66
Ukraine	0	7	109.51

Group D	W	L	DSC
Estonia	6	1	30.07
Norway	6	1	31.42
Scotland	6	1	46.58
Germany	4	3	40.33
Slovakia	3	4	97.23
Lithuania	2	5	54.88
Belgium	1	6	107.54
Mexico	0	7	148.49

Group B	W	L	DSC
Hungary	7	0	52.75
Switzerland	6	1	76.62
Turkey	5	2	62.84
Austria	3	4	56.80
Brazil	3	4	65.55
Chinese Taipei	2	5	47.54
Guyana	1	6	52.19
Netherlands	1	6	106.50

Group E	W	L	DSC
England	6	1	60.79
Finland	5	2	41.53
New Zealand	5	2	54.65
South Korea	5	2	73.71
Kazakhstan	4	3	54.08
Ireland	2	5	95.27
Qatar	1	6	139.94
Saudi Arabia	0	7	160.16

Group C	W	L	DSC
Australia	5	2	55.99
Czech Republic	5	2	33.83
Italy	5	2	90.03
China	5	2	38.98
Wales	4	3	104.11
France	2	5	95.41
Croatia	1	6	124.10
Nigeria	1	6	150.37

Group F	W	L	DSC
Russia	6	1	25.04
United States	6	1	51.96
Spain	6	1	53.40
Poland	4	3	49.88
Latvia	3	4	67.29
Slovenia	2	5	82.44
Greece	1	6	75.17
Kosovo	0	7	107.45

Rankings are determined by head-to-head record, where applicable, then DSC within their group.

=== Ranking of third-placed teams ===
Of the six teams placing third in their respective groups, the four with the lowest Draw Shot Challenge score will qualify for the playoffs.

Country	Group	DSC
Japan	A	26.34
Scotland	D	46.58
Spain	F	53.40
New Zealand	E	54.65
Turkey	B	62.84
Italy	C	90.03

== Round-robin results ==
All draw times are listed in Central European Summer Time (UTC+2).

=== Draw 1 ===
Saturday, 20 April, 09:00

Sheet A	1	2	3	4	5	6	7	8	Final
Brazil	0	4	0	0	2	0	5	1	12
Chinese Taipei 🔨	1	0	4	2	0	1	0	0	8

Sheet B	1	2	3	4	5	6	7	8	Final
Estonia 🔨	4	3	0	2	3	1	X	X	13
Mexico	0	0	1	0	0	0	X	X	1

Sheet C	1	2	3	4	5	6	7	8	Final
Slovakia	0	0	0	0	0	0	X	X	0
Norway 🔨	2	1	2	3	1	1	X	X	10

Sheet D	1	2	3	4	5	6	7	8	Final
Scotland 🔨	3	1	3	0	5	1	1	X	14
Belgium	0	0	0	1	0	0	0	X	1

Sheet E	1	2	3	4	5	6	7	8	Final
Lithuania 🔨	0	0	1	0	2	1	0	1	5
Germany	1	2	0	1	0	0	2	0	6

Sheet F	1	2	3	4	5	6	7	8	Final
Guyana 🔨	0	1	0	0	1	2	1	1	6
Netherlands	1	0	2	1	0	0	0	0	4

=== Draw 2 ===
Saturday, 20 April, 12:30

Sheet A	1	2	3	4	5	6	7	8	9	Final
Switzerland	0	2	2	0	3	0	0	1	2	10
Turkey 🔨	1	0	0	2	0	4	1	0	0	8

Sheet B	1	2	3	4	5	6	7	8	Final
New Zealand 🔨	3	1	1	0	4	0	1	X	10
Kazakhstan	0	0	0	3	0	1	0	X	4

Sheet C	1	2	3	4	5	6	7	8	Final
Qatar	1	0	1	0	2	0	1	X	5
England 🔨	0	4	0	2	0	6	0	X	12

Sheet D	1	2	3	4	5	6	7	8	Final
Ireland 🔨	1	0	0	3	1	0	0	0	5
Finland	0	1	1	0	0	2	2	2	8

Sheet E	1	2	3	4	5	6	7	8	Final
Saudi Arabia	0	0	0	0	0	1	X	X	1
South Korea 🔨	4	3	1	3	1	0	X	X	12

Sheet F	1	2	3	4	5	6	7	8	Final
Austria 🔨	0	1	0	0	0	0	1	X	2
Hungary	2	0	1	1	1	1	0	X	6

=== Draw 3 ===
Saturday, 20 April, 16:30

Sheet A	1	2	3	4	5	6	7	8	Final
Canada 🔨	4	2	1	0	0	3	2	X	12
Romania	0	0	0	3	1	0	0	X	4

Sheet B	1	2	3	4	5	6	7	8	Final
Russia 🔨	5	2	1	2	1	0	X	X	11
Kosovo	0	0	0	0	0	1	X	X	1

Sheet C	1	2	3	4	5	6	7	8	Final
Greece	0	0	0	0	1	0	0	X	1
Spain 🔨	4	1	1	1	0	1	1	X	9

Sheet D	1	2	3	4	5	6	7	8	9	Final
Slovenia	1	0	0	0	2	0	2	1	0	6
Latvia 🔨	0	2	1	2	0	1	0	0	2	8

Sheet E	1	2	3	4	5	6	7	8	Final
Poland 🔨	0	0	0	1	0	0	X	X	1
United States	1	3	2	0	3	1	X	X	10

Sheet F	1	2	3	4	5	6	7	8	Final
Belarus	0	0	0	0	0	0	0	X	0
Sweden 🔨	1	1	2	1	1	3	1	X	10

=== Draw 4 ===
Saturday, 20 April, 20:00

Sheet A	1	2	3	4	5	6	7	8	Final
Ukraine	0	1	0	0	0	0	0	X	1
Japan 🔨	2	0	3	1	1	1	1	X	9

Sheet B	1	2	3	4	5	6	7	8	Final
Nigeria	0	1	0	1	0	0	0	X	2
China 🔨	1	0	4	0	5	2	1	X	13

Sheet C	1	2	3	4	5	6	7	8	9	Final
Italy	0	1	0	0	1	2	2	0	0	6
Czech Republic 🔨	2	0	1	1	0	0	0	2	1	7

Sheet D	1	2	3	4	5	6	7	8	9	Final
Australia	1	0	0	0	0	3	1	0	0	5
Wales 🔨	0	1	1	1	1	0	0	1	1	6

Sheet E	1	2	3	4	5	6	7	8	Final
France 🔨	2	3	0	2	0	4	1	X	12
Croatia	0	0	1	0	2	0	0	X	3

Sheet F	1	2	3	4	5	6	7	8	Final
Hong Kong	0	0	0	2	0	3	0	1	6
Denmark 🔨	3	2	1	0	1	0	1	0	8

=== Draw 5 ===
Sunday, 21 April, 08:00

Sheet A	1	2	3	4	5	6	7	8	Final
South Korea 🔨	0	5	0	4	1	0	2	X	12
Qatar	2	0	1	0	0	1	0	X	4

Sheet B	1	2	3	4	5	6	7	8	Final
Finland 🔨	2	2	2	2	0	4	1	X	13
Saudi Arabia	0	0	0	0	1	0	0	X	1

Sheet C	1	2	3	4	5	6	7	8	Final
Switzerland 🔨	2	0	5	1	1	1	X	X	10
Brazil	0	1	0	0	0	0	X	X	1

Sheet D	1	2	3	4	5	6	7	8	Final
England 🔨	2	0	3	0	1	1	0	X	7
New Zealand	0	2	0	2	0	0	1	X	5

Sheet E	1	2	3	4	5	6	7	8	Final
Hungary 🔨	0	1	3	2	0	0	3	X	9
Turkey	1	0	0	0	1	1	0	X	3

Sheet F	1	2	3	4	5	6	7	8	Final
Kazakhstan	3	0	1	1	0	3	4	X	12
Ireland 🔨	0	3	0	0	1	0	0	X	4

=== Draw 6 ===
Sunday, 21 April, 11:15

Sheet A	1	2	3	4	5	6	7	8	Final
Germany 🔨	3	0	2	1	2	0	3	X	11
Belgium	0	2	0	0	0	1	0	X	3

Sheet B	1	2	3	4	5	6	7	8	Final
Chinese Taipei 🔨	2	0	1	0	0	0	1	X	4
Netherlands	0	3	0	1	1	1	0	X	6

Sheet C	1	2	3	4	5	6	7	8	Final
Guyana	1	0	1	0	2	0	1	0	5
Austria 🔨	0	2	0	1	0	1	0	2	6

Sheet D	1	2	3	4	5	6	7	8	Final
Lithuania	0	0	1	1	0	3	0	X	5
Norway 🔨	1	1	0	0	5	0	5	X	12

Sheet E	1	2	3	4	5	6	7	8	Final
Mexico	2	0	0	1	1	0	0	X	4
Scotland 🔨	0	5	3	0	0	5	2	X	15

Sheet F	1	2	3	4	5	6	7	8	Final
Slovakia	0	0	0	1	0	1	1	X	3
Estonia 🔨	4	1	1	0	2	0	0	X	8

=== Draw 7 ===
Sunday, 21 April, 14:30

Sheet A	1	2	3	4	5	6	7	8	Final
Croatia 🔨	0	0	0	0	3	0	0	X	3
Italy	3	3	3	1	0	1	3	X	14

Sheet B	1	2	3	4	5	6	7	8	Final
Wales	1	1	2	0	0	4	0	X	8
France 🔨	0	0	0	1	1	0	2	X	4

Sheet C	1	2	3	4	5	6	7	8	Final
Ukraine	0	0	0	0	0	0	X	X	0
Canada 🔨	1	2	3	4	4	4	X	X	18

Sheet D	1	2	3	4	5	6	7	8	Final
Czech Republic 🔨	1	5	5	2	3	4	X	X	20
Nigeria	0	0	0	0	0	0	X	X	0

Sheet E	1	2	3	4	5	6	7	8	Final
Denmark	0	0	0	1	0	0	X	X	1
Japan 🔨	4	2	4	0	2	3	X	X	15

Sheet F	1	2	3	4	5	6	7	8	Final
China	1	0	1	1	1	0	1	X	5
Australia 🔨	0	1	0	0	0	1	0	X	2

=== Draw 8 ===
Sunday, 21 April, 17:45

Sheet A	1	2	3	4	5	6	7	8	Final
United States 🔨	3	3	0	0	2	1	0	X	9
Latvia	0	0	1	1	0	0	1	X	3

Sheet B	1	2	3	4	5	6	7	8	Final
Romania	0	0	1	0	1	0	0	X	2
Sweden 🔨	1	2	0	2	0	4	1	X	10

Sheet C	1	2	3	4	5	6	7	8	Final
Belarus	0	1	2	1	0	1	0	1	6
Hong Kong 🔨	1	0	0	0	2	0	2	0	5

Sheet D	1	2	3	4	5	6	7	8	Final
Poland	1	1	0	4	0	0	3	0	9
Spain 🔨	0	0	2	0	5	1	0	2	10

Sheet E	1	2	3	4	5	6	7	8	Final
Kosovo	0	1	0	2	0	0	0	X	3
Slovenia 🔨	1	0	1	0	3	2	1	X	8

Sheet F	1	2	3	4	5	6	7	8	Final
Greece	0	0	0	0	0	0	X	X	0
Russia 🔨	3	3	3	2	2	2	X	X	15

=== Draw 9 ===
Sunday, 21 April, 21:00

Sheet A	1	2	3	4	5	6	7	8	Final
Scotland 🔨	3	2	1	0	1	1	1	X	9
Lithuania	0	0	0	3	0	0	0	X	3

Sheet B	1	2	3	4	5	6	7	8	Final
Germany 🔨	1	1	2	0	0	1	1	X	6
Slovakia	0	0	0	1	0	0	0	X	1

Sheet C	1	2	3	4	5	6	7	8	Final
Belgium	1	0	2	0	0	0	X	X	3
Estonia 🔨	0	3	0	6	2	2	X	X	13

Sheet D	1	2	3	4	5	6	7	8	Final
Netherlands	1	0	1	0	0	0	1	X	3
Hungary 🔨	0	4	0	3	1	1	0	X	9

Sheet E	1	2	3	4	5	6	7	8	Final
Austria	1	1	0	1	0	0	2	X	5
Switzerland 🔨	0	0	3	0	2	1	0	X	6

Sheet F	1	2	3	4	5	6	7	8	Final
Norway 🔨	2	1	1	0	5	4	X	X	13
Mexico	0	0	0	3	0	0	X	X	3

=== Draw 10 ===
Monday, 22 April, 08:00

Sheet A	1	2	3	4	5	6	7	8	Final
Slovenia	1	0	0	3	0	0	0	X	4
Poland 🔨	0	5	1	0	1	1	1	X	9

Sheet B	1	2	3	4	5	6	7	8	Final
United States 🔨	0	2	0	3	0	4	4	X	13
Greece	2	0	1	0	1	0	0	X	4

Sheet C	1	2	3	4	5	6	7	8	Final
Latvia	0	0	2	0	1	1	0	0	4
Russia 🔨	2	1	0	2	0	0	1	1	7

Sheet D	1	2	3	4	5	6	7	8	Final
Sweden 🔨	1	1	0	3	0	3	1	X	9
Denmark	0	0	1	0	1	0	0	X	2

Sheet E	1	2	3	4	5	6	7	8	Final
Hong Kong	2	0	2	1	0	2	3	X	10
Ukraine 🔨	0	1	0	0	3	0	0	X	4

Sheet F	1	2	3	4	5	6	7	8	Final
Spain 🔨	0	0	3	0	0	3	0	1	7
Kosovo	1	1	0	1	1	0	2	0	6

=== Draw 11 ===
Monday, 22 April, 11:15

Sheet A	1	2	3	4	5	6	7	8	Final
Saudi Arabia	0	1	0	0	0	0	0	X	1
England 🔨	2	0	1	1	1	3	1	X	9

Sheet B	1	2	3	4	5	6	7	8	Final
Brazil 🔨	3	3	0	2	0	3	X	X	11
Guyana	0	0	2	0	1	0	X	X	3

Sheet C	1	2	3	4	5	6	7	8	Final
Ireland	1	0	0	0	1	0	0	X	2
South Korea 🔨	0	4	3	2	0	3	1	X	13

Sheet D	1	2	3	4	5	6	7	8	Final
Turkey	1	0	3	1	0	4	X	X	9
Chinese Taipei 🔨	0	1	0	0	1	0	X	X	2

Sheet E	1	2	3	4	5	6	7	8	Final
Qatar 🔨	1	0	0	0	0	1	X	X	2
Kazakhstan	0	1	2	2	4	0	X	X	9

Sheet F	1	2	3	4	5	6	7	8	Final
New Zealand 🔨	3	1	1	0	0	1	0	3	9
Finland	0	0	0	1	2	0	2	0	5

=== Draw 12 ===
Monday, 22 April, 14:30

Sheet A	1	2	3	4	5	6	7	8	Final
France	1	1	0	4	0	0	2	2	10
Czech Republic 🔨	0	0	2	0	2	2	0	0	6

Sheet B	1	2	3	4	5	6	7	8	Final
Canada 🔨	2	1	1	1	2	2	X	X	9
Belarus	0	0	0	0	0	0	X	X	0

Sheet C	1	2	3	4	5	6	7	8	Final
Australia 🔨	2	2	2	1	2	1	X	X	10
Croatia	0	0	0	0	0	0	X	X	0

Sheet D	1	2	3	4	5	6	7	8	Final
Japan 🔨	2	0	2	0	4	0	3	X	11
Romania	0	1	0	1	0	1	0	X	3

Sheet E	1	2	3	4	5	6	7	8	Final
Italy	3	0	0	0	0	3	3	0	9
China 🔨	0	1	1	1	2	0	0	2	7

Sheet F	1	2	3	4	5	6	7	8	Final
Nigeria	2	0	1	0	0	0	1	X	4
Wales 🔨	0	6	0	1	2	1	0	X	10

=== Draw 13 ===
Monday, 22 April, 17:45

Sheet A	1	2	3	4	5	6	7	8	Final
Hungary	4	1	1	2	0	1	X	X	9
Brazil 🔨	0	0	0	0	2	0	X	X	2

Sheet B	1	2	3	4	5	6	7	8	Final
Norway 🔨	1	1	0	3	0	2	2	X	9
Belgium	0	0	1	0	1	0	0	X	2

Sheet C	1	2	3	4	5	6	7	8	Final
Mexico	0	0	0	1	0	0	0	X	1
Germany 🔨	3	2	2	0	1	2	2	X	12

Sheet D	1	2	3	4	5	6	7	8	Final
Slovakia 🔨	0	0	1	0	0	1	0	X	2
Scotland	1	3	0	1	2	0	4	X	11

Sheet E	1	2	3	4	5	6	7	8	Final
Estonia 🔨	2	2	0	4	2	3	X	X	13
Lithuania	0	0	1	0	0	0	X	X	1

Sheet F	1	2	3	4	5	6	7	8	Final
Netherlands	0	0	0	0	0	0	0	X	0
Switzerland 🔨	2	1	1	1	1	1	0	X	7

=== Draw 14 ===
Monday, 22 April, 21:00

Sheet A	1	2	3	4	5	6	7	8	Final
Turkey	1	0	3	3	0	0	2	X	9
Guyana 🔨	0	3	0	0	1	1	0	X	5

Sheet B	1	2	3	4	5	6	7	8	Final
South Korea	0	2	1	2	1	0	3	X	9
New Zealand 🔨	1	0	0	0	0	2	0	X	3

Sheet C	1	2	3	4	5	6	7	8	Final
Kazakhstan 🔨	5	0	6	0	0	4	X	X	15
Saudi Arabia	0	1	0	3	1	0	X	X	5

Sheet D	1	2	3	4	5	6	7	8	Final
Finland 🔨	0	2	1	1	0	4	2	X	10
Qatar	1	0	0	0	3	0	0	X	4

Sheet E	1	2	3	4	5	6	7	8	Final
England 🔨	3	1	1	0	1	0	2	X	8
Ireland	0	0	0	1	0	1	0	X	2

Sheet F	1	2	3	4	5	6	7	8	Final
Chinese Taipei 🔨	0	2	2	0	3	0	0	1	8
Austria	1	0	0	2	0	2	1	0	6

=== Draw 15 ===
Tuesday, 23 April, 08:00

Sheet A	1	2	3	4	5	6	7	8	Final
Japan 🔨	2	0	3	2	1	0	3	X	11
Belarus	0	1	0	0	0	1	0	X	2

Sheet B	1	2	3	4	5	6	7	8	Final
Croatia	0	0	1	2	1	2	0	1	7
Nigeria 🔨	2	1	0	0	0	0	1	0	4

Sheet C	1	2	3	4	5	6	7	8	Final
China 🔨	1	1	0	5	2	3	X	X	12
France	0	0	1	0	0	0	X	X	1

Sheet D	1	2	3	4	5	6	7	8	Final
Wales	0	2	0	0	1	0	X	X	3
Italy 🔨	4	0	1	3	0	4	X	X	12

Sheet E	1	2	3	4	5	6	7	8	Final
Czech Republic 🔨	0	1	1	2	0	1	0	0	5
Australia	2	0	0	0	1	0	2	1	6

Sheet F	1	2	3	4	5	6	7	8	9	Final
Romania	2	0	0	3	1	0	2	0	1	9
Hong Kong 🔨	0	4	1	0	0	1	0	2	0	8

=== Draw 16 ===
Tuesday, 23 April, 11:15

Sheet A	1	2	3	4	5	6	7	8	Final
Denmark	0	1	0	1	0	3	0	X	5
Canada 🔨	3	0	1	0	4	0	3	X	11

Sheet B	1	2	3	4	5	6	7	8	Final
Spain	1	1	0	0	1	0	3	1	7
Latvia 🔨	0	0	2	0	0	2	0	0	4

Sheet C	1	2	3	4	5	6	7	8	Final
Kosovo	0	0	0	0	0	0	X	X	0
United States 🔨	3	1	1	1	3	2	X	X	11

Sheet D	1	2	3	4	5	6	7	8	Final
Greece 🔨	0	0	0	0	2	0	1	X	3
Slovenia	1	4	1	1	0	2	0	X	9

Sheet E	1	2	3	4	5	6	7	8	Final
Russia	1	2	1	0	3	0	2	X	9
Poland 🔨	0	0	0	2	0	1	0	X	3

Sheet F	1	2	3	4	5	6	7	8	Final
Sweden	0	4	1	2	2	0	4	X	13
Ukraine 🔨	1	0	0	0	0	1	0	X	2

=== Draw 17 ===
Tuesday, 23 April, 14:30

Sheet A	1	2	3	4	5	6	7	8	Final
Estonia	2	0	1	0	1	0	0	0	4
Norway 🔨	0	2	0	2	0	2	1	1	8

Sheet B	1	2	3	4	5	6	7	8	Final
Austria 🔨	0	1	1	0	1	0	1	0	4
Turkey	2	0	0	1	0	1	0	1	5

Sheet C	1	2	3	4	5	6	7	8	9	Final
Lithuania 🔨	1	0	1	0	3	0	0	2	0	7
Slovakia	0	2	0	1	0	1	3	0	1	8

Sheet D	1	2	3	4	5	6	7	8	Final
Belgium 🔨	1	0	2	0	2	2	1	X	8
Mexico	0	2	0	1	0	0	0	X	3

Sheet E	1	2	3	4	5	6	7	8	Final
Brazil 🔨	2	2	0	3	0	0	3	X	10
Netherlands	0	0	1	0	1	2	0	X	4

Sheet F	1	2	3	4	5	6	7	8	Final
Scotland	0	2	0	2	0	3	0	1	8
Germany 🔨	1	0	1	0	2	0	1	0	5

=== Draw 18 ===
Tuesday, 23 April, 17:45

Sheet A	1	2	3	4	5	6	7	8	9	Final
Finland	0	3	0	0	0	0	0	4	0	7
Kazakhstan 🔨	2	0	1	1	1	1	1	0	1	8

Sheet B	1	2	3	4	5	6	7	8	Final
Switzerland	0	0	0	0	2	1	0	X	3
Hungary 🔨	1	2	1	1	0	0	5	X	10

Sheet C	1	2	3	4	5	6	7	8	Final
New Zealand 🔨	4	3	0	5	0	3	X	X	15
Qatar	0	0	1	0	1	0	X	X	2

Sheet D	1	2	3	4	5	6	7	8	Final
Saudi Arabia 🔨	0	2	0	0	0	0	X	X	2
Ireland	2	0	4	1	3	4	X	X	14

Sheet E	1	2	3	4	5	6	7	8	Final
Guyana	2	1	0	0	1	0	2	0	6
Chinese Taipei 🔨	0	0	2	1	0	2	0	3	8

Sheet F	1	2	3	4	5	6	7	8	Final
England	0	0	3	0	3	0	3	X	9
South Korea 🔨	1	1	0	1	0	1	0	X	4

=== Draw 19 ===
Tuesday, 23 April, 21:00

Sheet A	1	2	3	4	5	6	7	8	Final
Russia	0	1	2	0	0	2	0	X	5
Spain 🔨	1	0	0	2	4	0	4	X	11

Sheet B	1	2	3	4	5	6	7	8	Final
Hong Kong	0	0	2	0	0	1	0	X	3
Japan 🔨	3	2	0	1	2	0	1	X	9

Sheet C	1	2	3	4	5	6	7	8	Final
Poland 🔨	2	1	1	0	3	0	1	X	8
Greece	0	0	0	1	0	1	0	X	2

Sheet D	1	2	3	4	5	6	7	8	Final
Latvia 🔨	0	5	2	0	3	2	X	X	12
Kosovo	1	0	0	1	0	0	X	X	2

Sheet E	1	2	3	4	5	6	7	8	Final
Canada 🔨	0	2	0	0	4	0	0	1	7
Sweden	1	0	1	1	0	2	1	0	6

Sheet F	1	2	3	4	5	6	7	8	Final
Slovenia	0	1	0	0	2	0	0	X	3
United States 🔨	2	0	1	1	0	5	3	X	12

=== Draw 20 ===
Wednesday, 24 April, 08:00

Sheet A	1	2	3	4	5	6	7	8	Final
Mexico 🔨	0	1	1	0	0	1	0	X	3
Slovakia	2	0	0	4	4	0	4	X	14

Sheet B	1	2	3	4	5	6	7	8	Final
Scotland	1	0	0	0	0	3	0	2	6
Estonia 🔨	0	1	3	1	1	0	2	0	8

Sheet C	1	2	3	4	5	6	7	8	Final
Netherlands	1	0	1	0	0	0	0	X	2
Turkey 🔨	0	1	0	2	3	1	2	X	9

Sheet D	1	2	3	4	5	6	7	8	Final
Brazil 🔨	0	2	1	0	1	0	1	0	5
Austria	1	0	0	5	0	1	0	1	8

Sheet E	1	2	3	4	5	6	7	8	Final
Germany	0	0	0	0	2	0	2	X	4
Norway 🔨	3	1	1	1	0	2	0	X	8

Sheet F	1	2	3	4	5	6	7	8	Final
Belgium 🔨	0	0	3	0	1	0	0	X	4
Lithuania	2	1	0	1	0	4	2	X	10

=== Draw 21 ===
Wednesday, 24 April, 11:15

Sheet A	1	2	3	4	5	6	7	8	Final
Wales 🔨	0	0	0	0	2	0	0	X	2
China	2	1	1	2	0	2	1	X	9

Sheet B	1	2	3	4	5	6	7	8	Final
Ukraine	0	0	0	2	1	0	0	X	3
Denmark 🔨	5	1	1	0	0	2	3	X	12

Sheet C	1	2	3	4	5	6	7	8	Final
Nigeria	0	0	0	0	0	0	X	X	0
Italy 🔨	6	2	2	2	2	4	X	X	18

Sheet D	1	2	3	4	5	6	7	8	9	Final
France	0	0	0	1	0	2	1	1	0	5
Australia 🔨	1	1	2	0	1	0	0	0	1	6

Sheet E	1	2	3	4	5	6	7	8	Final
Belarus	0	0	1	0	3	1	2	0	7
Romania 🔨	2	1	0	2	0	0	0	3	8

Sheet F	1	2	3	4	5	6	7	8	Final
Czech Republic 🔨	1	1	1	1	3	1	0	X	8
Croatia	0	0	0	0	0	0	2	X	2

=== Draw 22 ===
Wednesday, 24 April, 14:30

Sheet A	1	2	3	4	5	6	7	8	Final
Ireland	0	0	1	0	0	1	2	X	4
New Zealand 🔨	5	1	0	1	1	0	0	X	8

Sheet B	1	2	3	4	5	6	7	8	Final
Kazakhstan	0	0	0	4	0	1	X	X	5
England 🔨	4	2	2	0	3	0	X	X	11

Sheet C	1	2	3	4	5	6	7	8	Final
Chinese Taipei	0	1	0	3	0	0	1	X	5
Hungary 🔨	3	0	3	0	1	1	0	X	8

Sheet D	1	2	3	4	5	6	7	8	Final
Switzerland	1	0	1	2	1	0	2	X	7
Guyana 🔨	0	1	0	0	0	1	0	X	2

Sheet E	1	2	3	4	5	6	7	8	Final
South Korea	1	1	2	0	1	0	1	0	6
Finland 🔨	0	0	0	5	0	1	0	1	7

Sheet F	1	2	3	4	5	6	7	8	Final
Qatar	1	1	0	1	1	2	0	1	7
Saudi Arabia 🔨	0	0	1	0	0	0	2	0	3

=== Draw 23 ===
Wednesday, 24 April, 17:45

Sheet A	1	2	3	4	5	6	7	8	Final
Kosovo 🔨	0	0	2	1	0	0	0	1	4
Greece	1	1	0	0	2	1	2	0	7

Sheet B	1	2	3	4	5	6	7	8	Final
Slovenia	0	0	1	0	2	0	X	X	3
Russia 🔨	1	2	0	3	0	2	X	X	8

Sheet C	1	2	3	4	5	6	7	8	Final
Sweden	1	0	1	1	0	3	0	1	7
Japan 🔨	0	1	0	0	2	0	1	0	4

Sheet D	1	2	3	4	5	6	7	8	Final
Canada	2	0	3	3	0	1	0	X	9
Hong Kong 🔨	0	1	0	0	1	0	1	X	3

Sheet E	1	2	3	4	5	6	7	8	Final
United States 🔨	3	0	0	1	0	4	0	X	8
Spain	0	1	1	0	1	0	2	X	5

Sheet F	1	2	3	4	5	6	7	8	Final
Latvia	0	0	0	1	1	1	0	2	5
Poland 🔨	3	2	1	0	0	0	1	0	7

=== Draw 24 ===
Wednesday, 24 April, 21:00

Sheet A	1	2	3	4	5	6	7	8	Final
Australia 🔨	3	0	4	1	2	0	5	X	15
Nigeria	0	1	0	0	0	2	0	X	3

Sheet B	1	2	3	4	5	6	7	8	Final
China 🔨	0	2	0	1	2	0	3	0	8
Czech Republic	1	0	4	0	0	2	0	3	10

Sheet C	1	2	3	4	5	6	7	8	Final
Romania	1	3	0	0	3	0	0	X	7
Denmark 🔨	0	0	5	2	0	2	3	X	12

Sheet D	1	2	3	4	5	6	7	8	Final
Ukraine	0	0	0	0	1	0	0	X	1
Belarus 🔨	2	2	1	1	0	1	1	X	8

Sheet E	1	2	3	4	5	6	7	8	Final
Croatia	0	1	0	0	0	0	4	X	5
Wales 🔨	5	0	1	1	1	1	0	X	9

Sheet F	1	2	3	4	5	6	7	8	Final
Italy	1	0	4	0	0	1	0	X	6
France 🔨	0	1	0	1	1	0	1	X	4

=== Draw 25 ===
Thursday, 25 April, 09:00

Sheet A	1	2	3	4	5	6	7	8	Final
Chinese Taipei 🔨	3	0	0	0	1	1	0	0	5
Switzerland	0	2	2	1	0	0	1	1	7

Sheet B	1	2	3	4	5	6	7	8	Final
Qatar	0	1	0	0	0	1	1	X	3
Ireland 🔨	1	0	3	1	4	0	0	X	9

Sheet C	1	2	3	4	5	6	7	8	9	Final
England	1	0	0	0	0	3	0	2	0	6
Finland 🔨	0	1	1	1	2	0	1	0	1	7

Sheet D	1	2	3	4	5	6	7	8	Final
South Korea 🔨	1	1	1	2	2	1	1	X	9
Kazakhstan	0	0	0	0	0	0	0	X	0

Sheet E	1	2	3	4	5	6	7	8	Final
New Zealand 🔨	6	2	0	4	1	1	X	X	14
Saudi Arabia	0	0	2	0	0	0	X	X	2

Sheet F	1	2	3	4	5	6	7	8	Final
Hungary	0	2	2	0	3	0	3	X	10
Guyana 🔨	1	0	0	2	0	2	0	X	5

=== Draw 26 ===
Thursday, 25 April, 12:30

Sheet A	1	2	3	4	5	6	7	8	Final
Austria 🔨	1	0	5	4	1	0	X	X	11
Netherlands	0	1	0	0	0	1	X	X	2

Sheet B	1	2	3	4	5	6	7	8	Final
Mexico	1	0	0	2	0	0	4	0	7
Lithuania 🔨	0	3	2	0	2	1	0	4	12

Sheet C	1	2	3	4	5	6	7	8	9	Final
Norway	0	0	2	0	0	2	1	1	0	6
Scotland 🔨	2	1	0	2	1	0	0	0	1	7

Sheet D	1	2	3	4	5	6	7	8	Final
Estonia 🔨	1	1	1	1	3	1	0	X	8
Germany	0	0	0	0	0	0	3	X	3

Sheet E	Final
Slovakia 🔨	W
Belgium	L

^ Belgium forfeited the game.

Sheet F	1	2	3	4	5	6	7	8	Final
Turkey	2	0	2	1	0	3	0	X	8
Brazil 🔨	0	3	0	0	1	0	1	X	5

=== Draw 27 ===
Thursday, 25 April, 16:00

Sheet A	1	2	3	4	5	6	7	8	Final
Hong Kong	0	0	1	0	0	0	X	X	1
Sweden 🔨	2	3	0	2	2	2	X	X	11

Sheet B	1	2	3	4	5	6	7	8	Final
Italy	0	0	0	1	0	2	0	X	3
Australia 🔨	2	1	1	0	1	0	2	X	7

Sheet C	1	2	3	4	5	6	7	8	Final
Czech Republic 🔨	1	1	0	5	0	4	4	X	15
Wales	0	0	1	0	1	0	0	X	2

Sheet D	1	2	3	4	5	6	7	8	Final
Croatia	1	0	0	0	1	0	X	X	2
China 🔨	0	2	2	2	0	4	X	X	10

Sheet E	1	2	3	4	5	6	7	8	Final
Nigeria	0	1	1	2	0	3	1	0	8
France 🔨	1	0	0	0	2	0	0	2	5

Sheet F	1	2	3	4	5	6	7	8	Final
Japan	0	3	0	1	0	3	0	2	9
Canada 🔨	1	0	1	0	2	0	3	0	7

=== Draw 28 ===
Thursday, 25 April, 19:30

Sheet A	1	2	3	4	5	6	7	8	Final
Romania	0	0	1	0	3	1	1	3	9
Ukraine 🔨	1	1	0	2	0	0	0	0	4

Sheet B	1	2	3	4	5	6	7	8	Final
Kosovo	0	0	0	0	0	2	0	X	2
Poland 🔨	2	1	1	1	1	0	4	X	10

Sheet C	1	2	3	4	5	6	7	8	Final
Spain 🔨	2	1	1	1	1	0	X	X	6
Slovenia	0	0	0	0	0	1	X	X	1

Sheet D	1	2	3	4	5	6	7	8	Final
Russia	1	0	0	1	0	1	0	2	5
United States 🔨	0	1	1	0	1	0	1	0	4

Sheet E	1	2	3	4	5	6	7	8	Final
Greece 🔨	3	0	0	1	0	1	0	0	5
Latvia	0	1	1	0	3	0	3	1	9

Sheet F	1	2	3	4	5	6	7	8	Final
Denmark 🔨	2	1	0	0	0	2	0	1	6
Belarus	0	0	2	1	1	0	3	0	7

== Playoffs ==
=== Bracket ===
Round of 16
1	Sweden	9
16	New Zealand	4
8	Norway	4
9	Czech Republic	5
4	Hungary	4
13	Japan	9
5	Australia	8
12	Switzerland	1
2	Russia	8
15	Spain	5
7	Canada	7
10	Finland	2
3	Estonia	8
14	Scotland	3
6	England	4
11	United States	7

Second round
1	Sweden	8
9	Czech Republic	3
13	Japan	5
5	Australia	6
2	Russia	3
7	Canada	7
3	Estonia	5
11	United States	9

Semifinals
1	Sweden	7
5	Australia	5
7	Canada	9
11	United States	5

Gold medal game
1	Sweden	6
7	Canada	5
Bronze medal game
5	Australia	4
11	United States	5

=== Round of 16 ===
Friday, 26 April, 9:00

Sheet B	1	2	3	4	5	6	7	8	Final
Sweden	1	0	3	1	2	2	0	X	9
New Zealand 🔨	0	3	0	0	0	0	1	X	4

Player percentages
Sweden		New Zealand	
Anna Hasselborg	88%	Bridget Becker	48%
Oskar Eriksson	73%	Sean Becker	58%
Total	79%	Total	54%

Sheet C	1	2	3	4	5	6	7	8	Final
Australia 🔨	3	0	2	1	1	1	X	X	8
Switzerland	0	1	0	0	0	0	X	X	1

Player percentages
Australia		Switzerland	
Tahli Gill	71%	Daniela Rupp	58%
Dean Hewitt	72%	Kevin Wunderlin	69%
Total	72%	Total	65%

Sheet D	1	2	3	4	5	6	7	8	Final
Hungary	0	1	0	0	0	3	0	0	4
Japan 🔨	1	0	2	1	1	0	1	3	9

Player percentages
Hungary		Japan	
Dorottya Palancsa	67%	Satsuki Fujisawa	73%
Zsolt Kiss	63%	Tsuyoshi Yamaguchi	89%
Total	65%	Total	83%

Sheet E	1	2	3	4	5	6	7	8	Final
Norway 🔨	0	0	1	0	0	2	1	0	4
Czech Republic	1	1	0	1	1	0	0	1	5

Player percentages
Norway		Czech Republic	
Kristin Skaslien	61%	Zuzana Paulová	67%
Magnus Nedregotten	68%	Tomáš Paul	79%
Total	65%	Total	74%

Friday, 26 April, 13:00

Sheet B	1	2	3	4	5	6	7	8	Final
Estonia 🔨	4	1	0	0	1	0	2	X	8
Scotland	0	0	1	1	0	1	0	X	3

Player percentages
Estonia		Scotland	
Marie Turmann	55%	Gina Aitken	54%
Harri Lill	71%	Scott Andrews	79%
Total	65%	Total	69%

Sheet C	1	2	3	4	5	6	7	8	Final
Russia	0	1	3	0	1	0	1	2	8
Spain 🔨	2	0	0	1	0	2	0	0	5

Player percentages
Russia		Spain	
Anastasia Moskaleva	78%	Oihane Otaegi	68%
Alexander Eremin	73%	Mikel Unanue	65%
Total	75%	Total	66%

Sheet D	1	2	3	4	5	6	7	8	Final
England	0	0	1	0	2	0	1	X	4
United States 🔨	1	1	0	2	0	3	0	X	7

Player percentages
England		United States	
Anna Fowler	53%	Cory Christensen	55%
Ben Fowler	55%	John Shuster	78%
Total	54%	Total	69%

Sheet E	1	2	3	4	5	6	7	8	Final
Canada 🔨	2	0	0	1	1	2	1	X	7
Finland	0	1	1	0	0	0	0	X	2

Player percentages
Canada		Finland	
Jocelyn Peterman	77%	Elina Virtaala	45%
Brett Gallant	67%	Tomi Rantamäki	62%
Total	71%	Total	55%

=== Quarterfinals ===
Friday, 26 April, 18:00

Sheet B	1	2	3	4	5	6	7	8	Final
Japan	1	0	2	0	2	0	0	0	5
Australia 🔨	0	2	0	1	0	1	1	1	6

Player percentages
Japan		Australia	
Satsuki Fujisawa	70%	Tahli Gill	82%
Tsuyoshi Yamaguchi	90%	Dean Hewitt	69%
Total	82%	Total	74%

Sheet C	1	2	3	4	5	6	7	8	Final
Sweden 🔨	1	1	1	1	0	0	4	X	8
Czech Republic	0	0	0	0	2	1	0	X	3

Player percentages
Sweden		Czech Republic	
Anna Hasselborg	86%	Zuzana Paulová	65%
Oskar Eriksson	79%	Tomáš Paul	70%
Total	81%	Total	68%

Sheet D	1	2	3	4	5	6	7	8	Final
Canada	0	0	1	2	2	0	1	1	7
Russia 🔨	1	1	0	0	0	1	0	0	3

Player percentages
Canada		Russia	
Jocelyn Peterman	80%	Anastasia Moskaleva	63%
Brett Gallant	86%	Alexander Eremin	65%
Total	84%	Total	64%

Sheet E	1	2	3	4	5	6	7	8	Final
Estonia	0	0	2	1	0	2	0	X	5
United States 🔨	2	1	0	0	3	0	3	X	9

Player percentages
Estonia		United States	
Marie Turmann	82%	Cory Christensen	86%
Harri Lill	74%	John Shuster	82%
Total	77%	Total	84%

=== Semifinals ===
Saturday, 27 April, 9:00

Sheet B	1	2	3	4	5	6	7	8	Final
Canada	0	3	0	3	0	2	1	X	9
United States 🔨	1	0	1	0	3	0	0	X	5

Player percentages
Canada		United States	
Jocelyn Peterman	83%	Cory Christensen	60%
Brett Gallant	89%	John Shuster	61%
Total	87%	Total	61%

Sheet D	1	2	3	4	5	6	7	8	Final
Sweden	0	1	2	0	2	1	1	0	7
Australia 🔨	1	0	0	3	0	0	0	1	5

Player percentages
Sweden		Australia	
Anna Hasselborg	81%	Tahli Gill	52%
Oskar Eriksson	81%	Dean Hewitt	53%
Total	81%	Total	53%

=== Bronze medal game ===
Saturday, 27 April, 13:00

Sheet C	1	2	3	4	5	6	7	8	9	Final
Australia 🔨	1	1	1	0	0	0	0	1	0	4
United States	0	0	0	1	1	1	1	0	1	5

Player percentages
Australia		United States	
Tahli Gill	54%	Cory Christensen	57%
Dean Hewitt	82%	John Shuster	78%
Total	71%	Total	70%

=== Gold medal game ===
Saturday, 27 April, 16:00

Sheet C	1	2	3	4	5	6	7	8	Final
Sweden	0	1	1	1	0	2	0	1	6
Canada 🔨	1	0	0	0	2	0	2	0	5

Player percentages
Sweden		Canada	
Anna Hasselborg	81%	Jocelyn Peterman	88%
Oskar Eriksson	86%	Brett Gallant	71%
Total	84%	Total	78%

== Final standings ==
Key
Teams to 2020 World Championship

Place	Team
1st place, gold medalist(s)	Sweden
2nd place, silver medalist(s)	Canada
3rd place, bronze medalist(s)	United States
4	Australia
5	Czech Republic
5	Estonia
5	Japan
5	Russia
9	England
9	Spain
9	Finland
9	Hungary

Place	Team
9	Norway
9	New Zealand
9	Scotland
9	Switzerland
17	Turkey
18	Italy
19	China
20	Germany
21	Poland
22	Denmark
23	Austria
24	South Korea

Place	Team
25	Kazakhstan
26	Brazil
27	Latvia
28	Belarus
29	Slovakia
30	Wales
31	Chinese Taipei
32	Lithuania
33	Slovenia
34	Ireland
35	France
36	Romania

Place	Team
37	Guyana
38	Hong Kong
39	Greece
40	Belgium
41	Croatia
42	Qatar
43	Netherlands
44	Kosovo
45	Ukraine
46	Mexico
47	Nigeria
48	Saudi Arabia

=== Top 5 Player percentages ===
Round robin only

Males	%
(Sweden) Oskar Eriksson	82
(Estonia) Harri Lill	82
(Japan) Tsuyoshi Yamaguchi	82
(Canada) Brett Gallant	81
(Italy) Amos Mosaner	79

Females	%
(Canada) Jocelyn Peterman	81
(Sweden) Anna Hasselborg	78
(Estonia) Marie Turmann	76
(Japan) Satsuki Fujisawa	76
(Russia) Anastasia Moskaleva	73
