= 2020 Czech Men's Curling Championship =

- Host city: Prague
- Dates: September 24 – 29, 2020
- Winner: Zbraslav Klíma (Lukáš Klíma)
- Skip: Lukáš Klíma
- Third: Marek Černovský
- Second: Jiří Candra
- Lead: Samuel Mokriš
- Coach: Jan Zelingr
- Finalist: Kolibris 1 (David Šik)

The 2020 Czech Men's Curling Championship (Czech: MČR mužů 2020) was held in Prague from September 24 to 29, 2020.

Four teams took part in the championship.

The team "Zbraslav Klíma" skipped by Lukáš Klíma won the championship (Klíma won his fourth title as player but second title as skip).

The 2020 Czech Women's Curling Championship was held simultaneously with this championship at the same arena.

== Teams ==
Team	Skip	Third	Second	Lead	Alternate	Coach
Kolibris 1	David Šik	Radek Boháč	Tomáš Paul	Milan Polívka	Erik Šik	
Liboc	Martin Jurík (fourth)	Karel Kubeška (skip)	David Jirounek	Ondřej Hálek	Jakub Splavec	
Zbraslav Klíma	Lukáš Klíma	Marek Černovský	Jiří Candra	Samuel Mokriš		Jan Zelingr
Zbraslav OH	Karel Klíma	Jan Sedlár	Martin Mulač	Jakub Skála	Michael Večeř	Jakub Bareš

== Round Robin ==
Three best teams to playoffs: first team to final "best of 3" series, 2nd and 3rd teams to semifinal.

	Team	A1	A2	A3	A4	Wins	Losses	Place
A1	Kolibris 1 (David Šik)	*	9:1; 8:3	5:8; 6:10	8:4; 9:0	4	2	2
A2	Liboc (Karel Kubeška)	1:9; 3:8	*	4:9; 6:8	9:4; 10:2	2	4	3
A3	Zbraslav Klíma (Lukáš Klíma)	8:5; 10:6	9:4; 8:6	*	8:5; 7:0	6	0	1
A4	Zbraslav OH (Karel Klíma)	4:8; 0:9	4:9; 2:10	5:8; 0:7	*	0	6	4

Teams to playoffs

== Playoffs ==
Semifinal			Final
			A-1	Zbraslav Klíma (Lukáš Klíma)	6	9	9
A-2	Kolibris 1 (David Šik)	7	A-2	Kolibris 1 (David Šik)	8	6	5
A-3	Liboc (Karel Kubeška)	4

=== Semifinal ===
September 27, 18:00 UTC+1

Sheet 2	1	2	3	4	5	6	7	8	9	10	Final
Liboc (Karel Kubeška)	0	0	1	0	1	0	1	0	1	X	4
Kolibris 1 (David Šik)	2	1	0	2	0	1	0	1	0	X	7

=== Final ("best of 3" series) ===
Game 1. September 28, 11:00

Sheet 3	1	2	3	4	5	6	7	8	9	10	Final
Kolibris 1 (David Šik)	0	2	1	1	0	0	3	0	1	X	8
Zbraslav Klíma (Lukáš Klíma)	2	0	0	0	1	1	0	2	0	X	6

Game 2. September 28, 18:00

Sheet 2	1	2	3	4	5	6	7	8	9	10	Final
Kolibris 1 (David Šik)	1	0	1	0	1	0	2	0	1	0	6
Zbraslav Klíma (Lukáš Klíma)	0	1	0	2	0	1	0	2	0	3	9

Game 3. September 29, 18:00

Sheet 2	1	2	3	4	5	6	7	8	9	10	Final
Kolibris 1 (David Šik)	0	2	0	0	0	1	0	2	0	X	5
Zbraslav Klíma (Lukáš Klíma)	1	0	1	1	3	0	2	0	1	X	9

== Final standings ==
Place	Team	Skip	Games	Wins	Losses
1st place, gold medalist(s)	Zbraslav Klíma	Lukáš Klíma	9	8	1
2nd place, silver medalist(s)	Kolibris 1	David Šik	10	6	4
3rd place, bronze medalist(s)	Liboc	Karel Kubeška	7	2	5
4	Zbraslav OH	Karel Klíma	6	0	6

== See also ==
- 2020 Czech Women's Curling Championship
- 2020 Czech Mixed Doubles Curling Championship
