= 2020 Czech Women's Curling Championship =

- Host city: Prague
- Dates: September 24 – 29, 2020
- Winner: Liboc 3 (Anna Kubešková)
- Skip: Anna Kubešková
- Third: Alžběta Baudyšová
- Second: Michaela Baudyšová
- Lead: Ežen Kolčevská
- Alternate: Petra Vinšová
- Coach: Karel Kubeška
- Finalist: Savona H (Hana Synáčková)

The 2020 Czech Women's Curling Championship (Czech: MČR žen 2020) was held in Prague from September 24 to 29, 2020.

Four teams took part in the championship.

The team "Liboc 3" skipped by Anna Kubešková won the championship (Kubešková won her eighth title as player and skip).

The 2020 Czech Men's Curling Championship was held simultaneously with this championship at the same arena.

== Teams ==
Team	Skip	Third	Second	Lead	Alternate	Coach
Liboc 3	Anna Kubešková	Alžběta Baudyšová	Michaela Baudyšová	Ežen Kolčevská	Petra Vinšová	Karel Kubeška
Savona H	Hana Synáčková	Karolína Frederiksen	Eliška Srnská			
Savona M	Eva Miklíková	Lenka Hronová	Markéta Taberyová	Eliška Soukupová		
Zbraslav W	Did not start ("technical loss" in all RR games)					

== Round Robin ==
Three best teams to playoffs: first team to final "best of 3" series, 2nd and 3rd teams to semifinal.

	Team	A1	A2	A3	A4	Wins	Losses	Place
A1	Liboc 3 (Anna Kubešková)	*	7:1; W	6:1; W	W W	6	0	1
A2	Savona H (Hana Synáčková)	1:7; L	*	9:3; W	W W	4	2	2
A3	Savona M (Eva Miklíková)	1:6; L	3:9; L	*	W W	2	4	3
A4	Zbraslav W	L L	L L	L L	*	0	6	4

Teams to playoffs
"W" – technical win, "L" – technical loss

== Playoffs ==
Semifinal			Final
			A-1	Liboc 3 (Anna Kubešková)	10	7	–
A-2	Savona H (Hana Synáčková)	12	A-2	Savona H (Hana Synáčková)	2	5	–
A-3	Savona M (Eva Miklíková)	4

=== Semifinal ===
September 27, 18:00 UTC+1

Sheet 3	1	2	3	4	5	6	7	8	9	10	Final
Savona M (Eva Miklíková)	0	0	1	2	0	1	0	0	0	X	4
Savona H (Hana Synáčková)	2	1	0	0	3	0	1	1	4	X	12

=== Final ("best of 3" series) ===
Game 1. September 28, 11:00

Sheet 2	1	2	3	4	5	6	7	8	9	10	Final
Liboc 3 (Anna Kubešková)	2	0	1	1	3	1	2	X	X	X	10
Savona H (Hana Synáčková)	0	2	0	0	0	0	0	X	X	X	2

Game 2. September 28, 18:00

Sheet 3	1	2	3	4	5	6	7	8	9	10	Final
Savona H (Hana Synáčková)	0	1	0	0	1	0	2	1	0	X	5
Liboc 3 (Anna Kubešková)	1	0	1	1	0	3	0	0	1	X	7

== Final standings ==
Place	Team	Skip	Games	Wins	Losses
1st place, gold medalist(s)	Liboc 3	Anna Kubešková	8	8	0
2nd place, silver medalist(s)	Savona H	Hana Synáčková	9	5	4
3rd place, bronze medalist(s)	Savona M	Eva Miklíková	7	2	5
4	Zbraslav W		6	0	6

== See also ==
- 2020 Czech Men's Curling Championship
- 2020 Czech Mixed Doubles Curling Championship
