= 2020 Czech Mixed Doubles Curling Championship =

- Host city: Prague
- Dates: February 1–4, 2020
- Winner: Zbraslav H (Zuzana Paulová / Tomáš Paul)
- Coach: Jakub Bareš
- Finalist: Savona 5 (Karolína Frederiksen / Radek Boháč)

The 2020 Czech Mixed Doubles Curling Championship (Czech: MČR mixed doubles 2020) was held in Prague from February 1 to 4, 2020.

Six teams took part in the championship.

The winners of the championship were team "Zbraslav H" (Zuzana Paulová / Tomáš Paul), who beat team "Savona 5" (Karolína Frederiksen / Radek Boháč) in the final. The bronze medal was won by team "Savona M" (Eva Miklíková / Dalibor Miklík).

The championship team represented the Czech Republic at the 2020 World Mixed Doubles Curling Championship.

== Teams ==
| Team | Woman | Man | Coach |
|---|---|---|---|
| Dion YB | Tereza Baudyšová | Jaroslav Vedral | Lukáš Klípa |
| Ledoborci | Veronika Neznalová | Matěj Neznal | |
| Savona 5 | Karolína Frederiksen | Radek Boháč | |
| Savona H | Martina Strnadová | Tomáš Válek | Danila Liamaev |
| Savona M | Eva Miklíková | Dalibor Miklík | |
| Zbraslav H | Zuzana Paulová | Tomáš Paul | Jakub Bareš |

== Round Robin ==
Key
| Teams to Playoffs |

| | Team | 1 | 2 | 3 | 4 | 5 | 6 | Wins | Losses | DSC, cm | Place |
|---|---|---|---|---|---|---|---|---|---|---|---|
| 1 | Dion YB (Baudyšová / Vedral) | * | 9:3 | 8:10 | 12:4 | 4:8 | 2:10 | 2 | 3 | 77.7 | 5 |
| 2 | Ledoborci (Neznalová / Neznal) | 3:9 | * | 4:6 | 4:8 | 6:10 | 1:14 | 0 | 5 | 39.0 | 6 |
| 3 | Savona 5 (Frederiksen / Boháč) | 10:8 | 6:4 | * | 11:2 | 3:6 | 5:6 | 3 | 2 | 56.1 | 2 |
| 4 | Savona H (Strnadová / Válek) | 4:12 | 8:4 | 2:11 | * | 9:5 | 9:10 | 2 | 3 | 56.2 | 4 |
| 5 | Savona M (Miklíková / Miklík) | 8:4 | 10:6 | 6:3 | 5:9 | * | 4:5 | 3 | 2 | 58.6 | 3 |
| 6 | Zbraslav H (Paulová / Paul) | 10:2 | 14:1 | 6:5 | 10:9 | 5:4 | * | 5 | 0 | 24,6 | 1 |

== Playoffs ==
| Semifinal | | | Final |
| | | | 1 | Zbraslav H (Paulová / Paul) | 8 |
| 2 | Savona 5 (Frederiksen / Boháč) | 8 | . | Savona 5 (Frederiksen / Boháč) | 4 |
| 3 | Savona M (Miklíková / Miklík) | 3 |

=== Semifinal ===
February 2, 17:30 UTC+1

| Team | 1 | 2 | 3 | 4 | 5 | 6 | 7 | 8 | Final |
| Savona 5 (Frederiksen / Boháč) | 0 | 3 | 0 | 1 | 0 | 3 | 1 | X | 8 |
| Savona M (Miklíková / Miklík) 🔨 | 1 | 0 | 1 | 0 | 1 | 0 | 0 | X | 3 |

=== Final ===
February 3, 14:00 UTC+1

| Team | 1 | 2 | 3 | 4 | 5 | 6 | 7 | 8 | Final |
| Savona 5 (Frederiksen / Boháč) | 0 | 0 | 1 | 0 | 1 | 1 | 1 | X | 4 |
| Zbraslav H (Paulová / Paul) 🔨 | 3 | 2 | 0 | 3 | 0 | 0 | 0 | X | 8 |

== Final standings ==
| Place | Team | Woman | Man | Games | Wins | Losses | DSC, cm |
|---|---|---|---|---|---|---|---|
| 1st place, gold medalist(s) | Zbraslav H | Zuzana Paulová | Tomáš Paul | 6 | 6 | 0 | |
| 2nd place, silver medalist(s) | Savona 5 | Karolína Frederiksen | Radek Boháč | 7 | 4 | 3 | |
| 3rd place, bronze medalist(s) | Savona M | Eva Miklíková | Dalibor Miklík | 6 | 3 | 3 | |
| 4 | Savona H | Martina Strnadová | Tomáš Válek | 5 | 2 | 3 | 56.2 |
| 5 | Dion YB | Tereza Baudyšová | Jaroslav Vedral | 5 | 2 | 3 | 77.7 |
| 6 | Ledoborci | Veronika Neznalová | Matěj Neznal | 5 | 0 | 5 | 39.0 |

== See also ==
- 2020 Czech Men's Curling Championship
- 2020 Czech Women's Curling Championship
