= 2019 WCT Arctic Cup =

World Curling Tour event

- Host city: Dudinka, Russia
- Arena: Taimyr Ice Arena
- Dates: May 23–26
- Winner: (Scotland) Team Muirhead
- Curling club: Dunkeld CC, Pitlochry, Scotland
- Skip: Eve Muirhead
- Third: Lauren Gray
- Second: Vicky Wright
- Lead: Vicki Chalmers
- Finalist: (Russia) Alina Kovaleva

The 2019 WCT Arctic Cup was held May 23 to 26 at the Taimyr Ice Arena in Dudinka, Russia. It was the final event of the 2018–19 curling season. In the final, Scottish Team Muirhead defeated Russian Team Kovaleva 5–4 to claim the title. Canadian Team Einarson defeated Team Sidorova from Russia to win the 3rd place medal. The total purse for the event was $US 50,000.

== Teams ==
The teams are listed as follows:

Skip	Third	Second	Lead	Alternate	Locale
Kerri Einarson	Val Sweeting	Shannon Birchard	Briane Meilleur		Gimli, Manitoba, Canada
Binia Feltscher	Carole Howald	Stefanie Berset	Larissa Hari		Flims, Switzerland
Eszter Juhász	Tiina Suuripää	Noora Suuripää	Marjo Hippi		Hyvinkää, Finland
Kim Kyeong-ae	Kim Seon-yeong	Kim Yeong-mi	Kim Cho-hi		Uiseong, South Korea
Alina Kovaleva	Anastasia Bryzgalova	Galina Arsenkina	Ekaterina Kuzmina	Uliana Vasilyeva	Saint-Petersburg, Russia
Eve Muirhead	Lauren Gray	Vicky Wright	Vicki Chalmers		Stirling, Scotland
Vlada Rumiantseva	Daria Morozova	Irina Riazanova	Vera Tiuliakova	Anastasia Mishchenko	Moscow, Russia
Anna Sidorova	Margarita Fomina	Yulia Portunova	Julia Guzieva	Nkeirouka Ezekh	Moscow, Russia
Anna Venevtseva	Ekaterina Galkina	Christina Dudko	Olga Zharkova		Krasnoyarsk, Russia
Isabella Wranå	Almida de Val	Fanny Sjöberg	Maria Larsson		Stockholm, Sweden

== Round-robin standings ==
Final round-robin standings

Key
Teams to Playoffs

Pool A	W	L
(Canada) Kerri Einarson	4	0
(Russia) Anna Sidorova	2	2
(Switzerland) Binia Feltscher	2	2
(Russia) Vlada Rumiantseva	2	2
(Finland) Eszter Juhász	0	4

Pool B	W	L
(Scotland) Eve Muirhead	4	0
(Russia) Alina Kovaleva	3	1
(Russia) Anna Venevtseva	2	2
(South Korea) Kim Kyeong-ae	1	3
(Sweden) Isabella Wranå	0	4

== Round-robin results ==
All draw times are listed in Krasnoyarsk Standard Time (UTC+07:00).

=== Draw 1 ===
Thursday, May 23, 14:30

Sheet A	1	2	3	4	5	6	7	8	Final
(Russia) Vlada Rumiantseva	0	0	1	2	0	0	2	0	5
(Finland) Eszter Juhász	0	1	0	0	1	1	0	1	4

Sheet B	1	2	3	4	5	6	7	8	Final
(Switzerland) Binia Feltscher	0	0	2	0	2	0	0	2	6
(Russia) Anna Sidorova	1	1	0	1	0	1	1	0	5

=== Draw 2 ===
Thursday, May 23, 18:00

Sheet A	1	2	3	4	5	6	7	8	Final
(Sweden) Isabella Wranå	0	0	0	2	0	1	0	0	3
(Scotland) Eve Muirhead	2	0	1	0	1	0	1	2	7

Sheet B	1	2	3	4	5	6	7	8	Final
(Russia) Anna Venevtseva	1	0	0	0	0	3	0	0	4
(Russia) Alina Kovaleva	0	0	0	0	4	0	0	4	8

=== Draw 3 ===
Friday, May 24, 09:00

Sheet A	1	2	3	4	5	6	7	8	Final
(Switzerland) Binia Feltscher	1	1	0	1	0	3	0	0	6
(Canada) Kerri Einarson	0	0	1	0	2	0	2	2	7

Sheet B	1	2	3	4	5	6	7	8	Final
(Russia) Anna Sidorova	5	1	2	1	2	0	X	X	11
(Finland) Eszter Juhász	0	0	0	0	0	1	X	X	1

=== Draw 4 ===
Friday, May 24, 12:00

Sheet A	1	2	3	4	5	6	7	8	Final
(Russia) Anna Venevtseva	0	1	0	2	0	1	1	1	6
(South Korea) Kim Kyeong-ae	1	0	3	0	1	0	0	0	5

Sheet B	1	2	3	4	5	6	7	8	Final
(Russia) Alina Kovaleva	0	0	0	1	0	1	0	X	2
(Scotland) Eve Muirhead	2	0	0	0	1	0	0	X	3

=== Draw 5 ===
Friday, May 24, 16:00

Sheet A	1	2	3	4	5	6	7	8	Final
(Canada) Kerri Einarson	0	4	2	1	4	0	X	X	11
(Russia) Anna Sidorova	0	0	0	0	0	1	X	X	1

Sheet B	1	2	3	4	5	6	7	8	Final
(Russia) Vlada Rumiantseva	0	2	1	0	0	1	1	1	6
(Switzerland) Binia Feltscher	0	0	0	1	1	0	0	0	2

=== Draw 6 ===
Friday, May 24, 19:00

Sheet A	1	2	3	4	5	6	7	8	Final
(South Korea) Kim Kyeong-ae	0	0	0	0	1	0	X	X	1
(Russia) Alina Kovaleva	2	0	1	3	0	2	X	X	8

Sheet B	1	2	3	4	5	6	7	8	Final
(Sweden) Isabella Wranå	0	0	2	0	1	0	0	X	3
(Russia) Anna Venevtseva	1	2	0	3	0	1	1	X	8

=== Draw 7 ===
Saturday, May 25, 09:00

Sheet A	1	2	3	4	5	6	7	8	Final
(Finland) Eszter Juhász	0	0	0	0	0	1	X	X	1
(Switzerland) Binia Feltscher	4	2	2	1	0	0	X	X	9

Sheet B	1	2	3	4	5	6	7	8	Final
(Canada) Kerri Einarson	3	1	1	1	0	0	X	X	6
(Russia) Vlada Rumiantseva	0	0	0	0	1	0	X	X	1

=== Draw 8 ===
Saturday, May 25, 12:00

Sheet A	1	2	3	4	5	6	7	8	Final
(Scotland) Eve Muirhead	4	1	0	5	2	1	X	X	13
(Russia) Anna Venevtseva	0	0	1	0	0	0	X	X	1

Sheet B	1	2	3	4	5	6	7	8	Final
(South Korea) Kim Kyeong-ae	1	1	0	2	0	0	1	1	6
(Sweden) Isabella Wranå	0	0	1	0	1	1	0	0	3

=== Draw 9 ===
Saturday, May 25, 16:00

Sheet A	1	2	3	4	5	6	7	8	Final
(Russia) Anna Sidorova	2	0	1	2	0	2	0	1	8
(Russia) Vlada Rumiantseva	0	2	0	0	2	0	1	0	5

Sheet B	1	2	3	4	5	6	7	8	Final
(Finland) Eszter Juhász	1	0	0	0	0	1	0	X	2
(Canada) Kerri Einarson	0	2	2	1	2	0	3	X	10

=== Draw 10 ===
Saturday, May 25, 19:00

Sheet A	1	2	3	4	5	6	7	8	Final
(Russia) Alina Kovaleva	2	0	2	1	1	X	X	X	6
(Sweden) Isabella Wranå	0	1	0	0	0	X	X	X	1

Sheet B	1	2	3	4	5	6	7	8	Final
(Scotland) Eve Muirhead	1	0	2	0	0	4	X	X	7
(South Korea) Kim Kyeong-ae	0	1	0	1	0	0	X	X	2

== Playoffs ==
Semifinals
A1	(Canada) Kerri Einarson	4
B2	(Russia) Alina Kovaleva	5
B1	(Scotland) Eve Muirhead	8
A2	(Russia) Anna Sidorova	2

Final
B2	(Russia) Alina Kovaleva	4
B1	(Scotland) Eve Muirhead	5

Third place game
A1	(Canada) Kerri Einarson	5
A2	(Russia) Anna Sidorova	4

=== Semifinals ===
Sunday, May 26, 09:00

Sheet A	1	2	3	4	5	6	7	8	Final
(Canada) Kerri Einarson	0	1	0	1	0	1	1	0	4
(Russia) Alina Kovaleva	2	0	1	0	1	0	0	1	5

Sheet B	1	2	3	4	5	6	7	8	Final
(Scotland) Eve Muirhead	0	1	1	3	0	3	X	X	8
(Russia) Anna Sidorova	0	0	0	0	2	0	X	X	2

=== Third place game ===
Sunday, May 26, 14:00

Sheet B	1	2	3	4	5	6	7	8	Final
(Canada) Kerri Einarson	0	1	2	1	0	1	0	0	5
(Russia) Anna Sidorova	1	0	0	0	1	0	1	1	4

=== Final ===
Sunday, May 26, 14:00

Sheet A	1	2	3	4	5	6	7	8	Final
(Russia) Alina Kovaleva	0	2	0	0	0	0	1	1	4
(Scotland) Eve Muirhead	1	0	0	2	1	1	0	0	5
