= Corinne Bourquin =

Swiss female curler and coach

- Curler ♀

Team
- Curling club: Flims PurePower CC, Flims

Curling career
- Member Association: Switzerland
- World Championship: 1 (2010)
- Other appearances: World Junior Championships: 2 (2001, 2002)
Medal record
Curling
World Junior Championships
Bronze medal – third place	2001 Ogden
Swiss Women's Championship
Gold medal – first place	2010 Bern
Gold medal – first place	2014 Schaffhausen

Corinne Bourquin (also known as Corinne Giger-Bourquin) is a Swiss curler and curling coach.

At the national level, she is a two-time Swiss women's champion curler (2010, 2014).

== Teams ==
Season	Skip	Third	Second	Lead	Alternate	Coach	Events
2000–01	Janine Greiner (fourth)	Carmen Schäfer (skip)	Jacqueline Greiner	Barbara Appenzeller	Corinne Bourquin	Roland Müggler	WJCC 2001 (bronze)
2001–02	Corinne Bourquin	Stephanie Fonk	Irene Schori	Yvonne Lüthi	Valeria Spälty	Betty Bourquin	WJCC 2002 (5th)
2003–04	Corinne Bourquin	?	?	?			
2007–08	Binia Feltscher-Beeli	Sandra Attinger	Yvonne Schlunegger	Corinne Bourquin			
2008–09	Binia Feltscher-Beeli	Sandra Ramstein-Attinger	Sibille Buhlmann	Corinne Bourquin			
2009–10	Binia Feltscher	Corinne Borquin	Sibille Bühlmann	Sandra Ramstein	Yvonne Schlunegger, Heike Schwaller	Gaudenz Beeli	SWCC 2010 (gold)
2009–10	Binia Feltscher-Beeli	Corinne Borquin	Heike Schwaller	Sandra Ramstein-Attinger	Marisa Winkelhausen	Gaudenz Beeli, Lorne Hamblin	WCC 2010 (10th)
2011–12	Corinne Bourquin	Fabienne Fürbringer	Daniela Rupp	Sandra Ramstein	Janine Wyss	Björn Schröder	SWCC 2012 (6th)
2012–13	Sandra Ramstein	Daniela Rupp	Melanie Wild	Janine Wyss	Lea Jauch, Corinne Bourguin		SWCC 2013 (6th)
2013–14	Binia Feltscher	Irene Schori	Franziska Kaufmann	Christine Urech	Carole Howald, Corinne Borquin	Gaudenz Beeli	SWCC 2014 (gold)

== Record as a coach of national teams ==
Year	Tournament, event	National team	Place
2011	2011 World Junior Curling Championships	Switzerland (junior women)	6
