= Stefanie Berset =

Swiss curler (born 1996)

- Curler
- Born: 16 December 1996 (age 29); Bern, Switzerland

Team
- Curling club: CC3C, Geneva, Switzerland
- Skip: Alina Pätz
- Third: Selina Witschonke
- Second: Stefanie Berset
- Lead: Renée Frigo
- Mixed doubles partner: Philipp Hösli

Curling career
- Member Association: Switzerland
- World Championship: 2 (2024, 2025)
- World Mixed Doubles Championship: 1 (2026)
- European Championship: 4 (2023, 2024, 2025, 2026)
- Olympic: 1 (2026)
- Grand Slam victories: 1 (2026 National)
Medal record
Women's curling
Representing Switzerland
Olympic Games
| Silver medal – second place | 2026 Milano Cortina | Team |
World Championships
| Silver medal – second place | 2024 Sydney |
| Silver medal – second place | 2025 Uijeongbu |
European Championships
| Gold medal – first place | 2023 Aberdeen |
| Gold medal – first place | 2024 Lohja |
| Silver medal – second place | 2026 Ostrava |
| Bronze medal – third place | 2025 Lohja |

Stefanie Berset (born 16 December 1996) is a Swiss curler from Bern. She currently plays second on Team Alina Pätz. She won the silver medal at 2026 Winter Olympics as the alternate of the Swiss women's curling team.

== Career ==
Berset played for the Jana Stritt rink in juniors, but never was able to win the Swiss Junior Curling Championships. When she aged out of juniors, she joined the Binia Feltscher rink for the 2018–19 season. She and Larissa Hari replaced Franziska Kaufmann who had retired from competitive curling and Irene Schori who formed her own team. Carole Howald moved from lead to third.

Team Feltscher had a pretty successful first year together although they didn't win any events. They made the finals at the Women's Masters Basel and the Swiss Women's Curling Championship and finished fourth at the Schweizer Cup. They also had five quarterfinal appearances including qualifying at the 2018 Tour Challenge Tier 2 Grand Slam of Curling event. They ended their season at the 2019 WCT Arctic Cup but failed to advance to the playoffs.

The Feltscher rink had a slow start to the 2019–20 season, failing to make the playoffs in their first four events. They made the quarterfinals of the 2019 Tour Challenge Tier 2 slam event and finished third at both the 2019 Changan Ford International Curling Elite and the Schweizer Cup. They picked it up in the second half of the season however, qualifying in every event. They placed third at the 2020 Swiss Women's Curling Championship. Binia Feltscher retired from competitive curling at the end of the season and the team disbanded.

Berset and Howald joined the Irene Schori rink for the 2020–21 season. The team competed in two tour events during the abbreviated season, finishing third at the 2020 Schweizer Cup and reaching the quarterfinals of the 2020 Women's Masters Basel. Team Schori was one of four teams to compete in the 2021 Swiss Women's Curling Championship, where they finished in last place with a 2–7 record after the triple round robin.

To begin the 2021–22 season, Team Schori was invited to compete alongside the men's teams at the 2021 Baden Masters. There, they finished with a 1–3 record, only beating Magnus Nedregotten of Norway. Elsewhere on tour, they won the Part II Bistro Ladies Classic over Cathy Auld and made it to two other event finals. They lost to Eve Muirhead in the final of The Challenger and to Nora Wüest in the St. Galler Elite Challenge final. They also had playoff appearances at the 2021 Women's Masters Basel, Stu Sells Toronto Tankard and the DeKalb Superspiel. Team Schori competed in one Grand Slam event, the 2021 National, where they finished with a winless 0–3 record. The team finished their season with a 2–3 record at the 2022 Swiss Women's Curling Championship, not advancing to the second round. Third Carole Howald left the team following the season. Berset, Irene Schori and Lara Stocker then added Michèle Jäggi and Sarah Müller to their team for the 2022–23 season. Jäggi took over the team at skip with Schori at third, Berset playing second, Müller at lead and Stocker as the alternate.

Team Jäggi found immediate success to begin the 2022–23 season, reaching the semifinals of the 2022 Euro Super Series. Two events later, they advanced to the finals of the 2022 Women's Masters Basel where they were defeated by Raphaela Keiser. In Canada, they qualified for another final at the 2022 Alberta Curling Series: Event 3, losing to Rebecca Morrison. The team next played in the 2022 Curlers Corner Autumn Gold Curling Classic where they qualified for the playoffs through the C event. They then upset both the Kaitlyn Lawes and Jennifer Jones rinks in the playoffs to reach another final where they lost to Gim Eun-ji 8–2. With the points accumulated from their successful results, Team Jäggi qualified for two Grand Slam events, the 2022 Masters and the 2023 Canadian Open. At the Masters, they finished 2–2 through the round robin before losing a tiebreaker to Anna Hasselborg. At the Canadian Open, they missed the playoffs with a 1–3 record. Despite their successes on tour, they could not continue their run at the Swiss Women's Championship as they finished 3–5 through the round robin and failed to advance to the second round. After the season, the team announced they were going separate ways. Schori retired from competitive curling while Müller moved on to join Corrie Hürlimann. Initially, Berset and Jäggi were set to play with Selina Witschonke and Elena Mathis, however, Witschonke left the team a month after the announcement to join the Silvana Tirinzoni rink.

Not able to find a fourth player, Jäggi, Berset and Lisa Muhmenthaler played with various spares for the 2023–24 season. In their first event, the 2023 Euro Super Series, Olympic gold medallist Eve Muirhead slotted into the lineup at third. This squad reached the quarterfinals where they lost to Marianne Rørvik. They then played in the 2023 Oslo Cup with two-time Canadian champion Chelsea Carey. This earned them another quarterfinal finish, again losing out to Team Rørvik. They had a third consecutive quarterfinal appearance at the 2023 Women's Masters Basel with long-time German skip Daniela Jentsch. In Canada, the team played in six tour events, qualifying in just one. This came at the 2023 Curlers Corner Autumn Gold Curling Classic with Carey skipping the team. They also played with spares Robyn Silvernagle and Ashley Howard in their other events. Back in Switzerland, they had a fifth quarterfinal finish at the 2024 International Bernese Ladies Cup where Irene Schori joined the team for the event. At the Swiss Championship, they finished with a 1–3 record, failing to qualify. The team disbanded following the season with Berset joining the Corrie Hürlimann rink as their alternate for the 2024–25 season. Also during the 2023–24 season, Berset was named as Team Tirinzoni's alternate for both the 2023 European Curling Championships and 2024 World Women's Curling Championship. At the Europeans, the team would go undefeated to claim the gold medal, defeating Italy's Stefania Constantini 6–5 in the final. At the World Championship, they finished 10–2 through the round robin and beat Italy in the semifinal before coming up short against Canada's Rachel Homan in the final, settling for silver. While still curling with Team Hürlimann throughout the season, Berset would continue as Tirinzoni's alternate for the 2024 European Curling Championships, where they would go undefeated to win gold, as well as the 2025 World Women's Curling Championship, where they would again lose to Canada's Rachel Homan in the final, winning the silver medal.

Team Hürlimann would beat Tirinzoni's rink and win the 2024 Swiss Women's Curling Championships, which also served as the sole Swiss qualifying tournament for the 2025 European Curling Championships, qualifying Hürlimann to represent Switzerland and marking Berset's first appearance as a second at the Europeans. There, Team Hürlimann would win the bronze medal, beating Norway's Marianne Rørvik 8–4 in the bronze medal game.

== Personal life ==
Berset is currently a student.

== Teams ==
| Season | Skip | Third | Second | Lead | Alternate |
|---|---|---|---|---|---|
| 2014–15 | Jana Stritt | Stefanie Berset | Joelle Lutz | Sophia Piccinni | Anouk von Allmen |
| 2016–17 | Jana Stritt | Stefanie Berset | Joelle Lutz | Jasmine Egli | |
| 2018–19 | Binia Feltscher | Carole Howald | Stefanie Berset | Larissa Hari | |
| 2019–20 | Binia Feltscher | Carole Howald | Stefanie Berset | Larissa Hari | Michèle Jäggi |
| 2020–21 | Irene Schori | Carole Howald | Lara Stocker | Stefanie Berset | |
| 2021–22 | Irene Schori | Carole Howald | Lara Stocker | Stefanie Berset | |
| 2022–23 | Michèle Jäggi | Irene Schori | Stefanie Berset | Sarah Müller | Lara Stocker |
| 2023–24 | Michèle Jäggi | – | Stefanie Berset | Lisa Muhmenthaler | |
| 2024–25 | Corrie Hürlimann | Celine Schwizgebel | Sarah Müller | Marina Lörtscher | Stefanie Berset |
| 2025–26 | Corrie Hürlimann | Marina Lörtscher | Stefanie Berset | Celine Schwizgebel | Melina Bezzola (ECC) |
| 2026–27 | Alina Pätz | Selina Witschonke | Stefanie Berset | Renée Frigo | Nadine Bärtschiger (ECC) |
