= Larissa Hari =

Swiss curler

- Curler
- Born: 31 January 1996 (age 30); Adelboden, Switzerland

Team
- Curling club: CC Adelboden, Adelboden

Curling career
- Member Association: Switzerland

Larissa Hari (born 31 January 1996) is a Swiss curler from Adelboden.

== Career ==
In her junior career, Hari played lead for Livia Schmid with Céline Koller as third and Alicia Guadaupi as second. They didn't win or medal at the Swiss Junior Curling Championships in any of their attempts. She later joined Aline Fellmann before joining the Binia Feltscher rink for the 2018–19 season. She and Stefanie Berset replaced Franziska Kaufmann who had retired and Irene Schori who formed her own team. Carole Howald moved from lead to third.

Team Feltscher had a pretty successful first year together although they didn't win any events. They made the finals at the Women's Masters Basel and the Swiss Women's Curling Championship and finished fourth at the Schweizer Cup. They also had five quarterfinal appearances including qualifying at the 2018 Tour Challenge Tier 2 Grand Slam of Curling event. They ended their season at the 2019 WCT Arctic Cup but failed to advance to the playoffs.

The Feltscher rink had a slow start to the 2019–20 season, failing to make the playoffs in their first four events. They made the quarterfinals of the 2019 Tour Challenge Tier 2 slam event and finished third at both the 2019 Changan Ford International Curling Elite and the Schweizer Cup. They picked it up in the second half of the season however, qualifying in every event. They placed third at the 2020 Swiss Women's Curling Championship.

== Personal life ==
Hari works as a sales & marketing assistant.

== Teams ==
Season	Skip	Third	Second	Lead	Alternate
2014–15	Livia Schmid	Céline Koller	Alicia Guadaupi	Larissa Hari	Simone Wilhelm
2016–17	Aline Fellman	Noëlle Iseli	Larissa Hari	Gisele Berchtold	
2018–19	Binia Feltscher	Carole Howald	Stefanie Berset	Larissa Hari	
2019–20	Binia Feltscher	Carole Howald	Stefanie Berset	Larissa Hari	Michèle Jäggi
