= 2020 Swiss Women's Curling Championship =

- Host city: Thun, Switzerland
- Dates: February 9–15
- Winner: (Valais) Team Stern
- Curling club: CC Oberwallis, Brig-Glis
- Skip: Elena Stern
- Fourth: Briar Hürlimann
- Second: Lisa Gisler
- Lead: Céline Koller
- Alternate: Christine Urech
- Coach: Earle Morris
- Finalist: (Aargau) Silvana Tirinzoni

The 2020 Swiss Women's Curling Championship, Switzerland's national women's curling championship, was held from February 9 to 15 in Thun, Switzerland. The winning Elena Stern team was supposed to represent Switzerland at the 2020 World Women's Curling Championship at the CN Centre in Prince George, British Columbia, Canada but the event got cancelled due to the COVID-19 pandemic.

The event featured the reigning World Champion rink Silvana Tirinzoni from Aarau, the Elena Stern rink from CC Oberwallis and two time World Champion team Binia Feltscher from Langenthal. In the final, Stern capped off an undefeated week by defeating Tirinzoni's team for the third time during the competition. Feltscher won the bronze medal with a 9–8 win over Nora Wüest.

== Teams ==
The teams are listed as follows:

Club	Skip	Third	Second	Lead	Alternate	Locale
CC Langenthal	Binia Feltscher	Michèle Jäggi	Carole Howald	Stefanie Berset	Larissa Hari	(Canton of Bern) Langenthal
CC Zug	Corrie Hürlimann	Flurina Kobler	Melina Bezzola	Jessica Jäggi	Anna Stern	(Canton of Zug) Zug
CC Limmattal	Irene Schori	Lara Stocker	Roxanne Héritier	Isabelle Maillard	Franziska Graf	(Canton of Zurich) Urdorf
CC Oberwallis	Briar Hürlimann (Fourth)	Elena Stern (Skip)	Lisa Gisler	Céline Koller	Christine Urech	(Valais) Brig-Glis
CC Lausanne Olympique	Celine Schwizgabel (Fourth)	Ophélie Gauchat	Fabienne Gimmel	Emma Suter (Skip)	Anaelle Ciganek	(Vaud) Lausanne
CC Aarau	Alina Pätz (Fourth)	Silvana Tirinzoni (Skip)	Esther Neuenschwander	Melanie Barbezat		(Aargau) Aarau
CC Wetzikon	Nora Wüest	Marina Hauser	Ladina Müller	Lisa Gugler	Karin Winter	(Canton of Zurich) Wetzikon

== Round robin standings ==
Final round robin standings

Key
Teams to Championship Round

Skip	W	L	PF	PA	EW	EL	BE	SE
(Valais) Elena Stern (Oberwallis)	6	0	43	31	28	21	3	8
(Aargau) Silvana Tirinzoni (Aarau)	5	1	46	22	24	17	2	7
(Canton of Bern) Binia Feltscher (Langenthal)	3	3	41	44	21	26	4	6
(Canton of Zurich) Nora Wüest (Wetzikon)	3	3	35	37	25	24	4	7
(Canton of Zurich) Irene Schori (Limmattal)	2	4	39	40	25	21	4	5
(Vaud) Emma Suter (Lausanne)	1	5	23	42	17	25	5	0
(Canton of Zug) Corrie Hürlimann (Zug)	1	5	33	44	21	27	4	5

== Round robin results ==
All draw times are listed in Central European Time (UTC+01:00).

=== Draw 1 ===
Sunday, February 9, 4:00 pm

Sheet A	1	2	3	4	5	6	7	8	9	10	Final
(Canton of Zug) Corrie Hürlimann	0	0	0	2	0	4	1	1	0	X	8
(Canton of Zurich) Irene Schori 🔨	0	0	2	0	2	0	0	0	1	X	5

Sheet B	1	2	3	4	5	6	7	8	9	10	Final
(Canton of Bern) Binia Feltscher	0	0	2	0	0	0	0	3	1	0	6
(Valais) Elena Stern 🔨	1	0	0	3	1	3	0	0	0	1	9

Sheet C	1	2	3	4	5	6	7	8	9	10	Final
(Aargau) Silvana Tirinzoni 🔨	2	0	2	0	0	0	1	0	0	1	6
(Canton of Zurich) Nora Wüest	0	0	0	1	1	0	0	0	1	0	3

=== Draw 2 ===
Monday, February 10, 8:00 am

Sheet B	1	2	3	4	5	6	7	8	9	10	Final
(Canton of Zurich) Nora Wüest 🔨	1	0	1	1	1	0	2	0	1	X	7
(Vaud) Emma Suter	0	1	0	0	0	1	0	1	0	X	3

Sheet C	1	2	3	4	5	6	7	8	9	10	Final
(Canton of Zurich) Irene Schori	0	0	1	0	1	2	0	0	1	0	5
(Valais) Elena Stern 🔨	2	0	0	1	0	0	0	1	0	2	6

Sheet D	1	2	3	4	5	6	7	8	9	10	Final
(Canton of Zug) Corrie Hürlimann	0	0	0	0	1	0	2	1	2	1	7
(Canton of Bern) Binia Feltscher 🔨	1	2	0	2	0	3	0	0	0	0	8

=== Draw 3 ===
Monday, February 10, 4:00 pm

Sheet A	1	2	3	4	5	6	7	8	9	10	Final
(Canton of Zurich) Nora Wüest	0	0	1	0	0	3	1	0	1	X	6
(Valais) Elena Stern 🔨	0	3	0	1	2	0	0	1	0	X	7

Sheet C	1	2	3	4	5	6	7	8	9	10	Final
(Vaud) Emma Suter	0	0	1	0	0	1	X	X	X	X	2
(Canton of Bern) Binia Feltscher 🔨	0	3	0	3	3	0	X	X	X	X	9

Sheet D	1	2	3	4	5	6	7	8	9	10	Final
(Canton of Zurich) Irene Schori	0	2	0	1	0	1	0	X	X	X	4
(Aargau) Silvana Tirinzoni 🔨	3	0	2	0	2	0	2	X	X	X	9

=== Draw 4 ===
Tuesday, February 11, 9:00 am

Sheet A	1	2	3	4	5	6	7	8	9	10	Final
(Canton of Bern) Binia Feltscher 🔨	2	0	1	0	0	0	1	0	X	X	4
(Aargau) Silvana Tirinzoni	0	2	0	3	1	3	0	2	X	X	11

Sheet B	1	2	3	4	5	6	7	8	9	10	Final
(Vaud) Emma Suter	0	0	1	0	0	1	0	2	0	X	4
(Canton of Zurich) Irene Schori 🔨	0	3	0	1	0	0	1	0	3	X	8

Sheet C	1	2	3	4	5	6	7	8	9	10	11	Final
(Canton of Zug) Corrie Hürlimann 🔨	0	0	1	0	0	0	0	3	0	1	0	5
(Canton of Zurich) Nora Wüest	0	0	0	1	1	1	1	0	1	0	1	6

=== Draw 5 ===
Tuesday, February 11, 7:00 pm

Sheet A	1	2	3	4	5	6	7	8	9	10	Final
(Vaud) Emma Suter 🔨	0	1	0	1	0	2	0	4	0	1	9
(Canton of Zug) Corrie Hürlimann	0	0	1	0	2	0	2	0	1	0	6

Sheet B	1	2	3	4	5	6	7	8	9	10	Final
(Valais) Elena Stern 🔨	1	3	1	0	0	1	0	2	0	X	8
(Aargau) Silvana Tirinzoni	0	0	0	2	1	0	1	0	1	X	5

Sheet D	1	2	3	4	5	6	7	8	9	10	Final
(Canton of Zurich) Nora Wüest	0	0	0	5	0	2	0	1	0	0	8
(Canton of Zurich) Irene Schori 🔨	1	0	0	0	1	0	2	0	2	1	7

=== Draw 6 ===
Wednesday, February 12, 12:00 pm

Sheet A	1	2	3	4	5	6	7	8	9	10	Final
(Canton of Zurich) Irene Schori	2	0	2	2	1	0	1	0	2	X	10
(Canton of Bern) Binia Feltscher 🔨	0	2	0	0	0	1	0	2	0	X	5

Sheet C	1	2	3	4	5	6	7	8	9	10	Final
(Valais) Elena Stern 🔨	2	0	1	0	0	3	0	1	1	X	8
(Canton of Zug) Corrie Hürlimann	0	1	0	0	3	0	1	0	0	X	5

Sheet D	1	2	3	4	5	6	7	8	9	10	Final
(Aargau) Silvana Tirinzoni 🔨	3	0	0	3	1	0	X	X	X	X	7
(Vaud) Emma Suter	0	0	0	0	0	1	X	X	X	X	1

=== Draw 7 ===
Wednesday, February 12, 8:00 pm

Sheet A	1	2	3	4	5	6	7	8	9	10	Final
(Valais) Elena Stern	1	1	0	1	0	0	0	1	0	1	5
(Vaud) Emma Suter 🔨	0	0	1	0	0	2	0	0	1	0	4

Sheet B	1	2	3	4	5	6	7	8	9	10	Final
(Aargau) Silvana Tirinzoni 🔨	2	0	0	2	3	0	1	X	X	X	8
(Canton of Zug) Corrie Hürlimann	0	0	1	0	0	1	0	X	X	X	2

Sheet D	1	2	3	4	5	6	7	8	9	10	Final
(Canton of Bern) Binia Feltscher	0	0	3	0	1	1	0	3	1	X	9
(Canton of Zurich) Nora Wüest 🔨	1	0	0	2	0	0	2	0	0	X	5

== Championship Round ==
=== Standings ===
Final Championship Pool standings

Key
Teams to Final

Skip	W	L	PF	PA	EW	EL	BE	SE
(Valais) Elena Stern (Oberwallis)	9	0	64	44	41	30	6	12
(Aargau) Silvana Tirinzoni (Aarau)	6	3	67	43	36	29	3	9
(Canton of Bern) Binia Feltscher (Langenthal)	5	4	62	61	32	37	9	9
(Canton of Zurich) Nora Wüest (Wetzikon)	3	6	46	60	34	38	4	7

=== Results ===
==== Draw 8 ====
Thursday, February 13, 6:00 pm

Sheet A	1	2	3	4	5	6	7	8	9	10	Final
(Canton of Zurich) Nora Wüest	0	1	0	1	0	0	0	0	X	X	2
(Canton of Bern) Binia Feltscher 🔨	1	0	3	0	1	3	1	1	X	X	10

Sheet B	1	2	3	4	5	6	7	8	9	10	Final
(Aargau) Silvana Tirinzoni	0	2	1	0	0	0	1	0	2	0	6
(Valais) Elena Stern 🔨	2	0	0	0	2	1	0	2	0	1	8

==== Draw 9 ====
Friday, February 14, 12:00 pm

Sheet C	1	2	3	4	5	6	7	8	9	10	Final
(Canton of Bern) Binia Feltscher	0	0	0	0	2	0	0	2	0	X	4
(Valais) Elena Stern 🔨	1	3	0	2	0	2	0	0	1	X	9

Sheet D	1	2	3	4	5	6	7	8	9	10	Final
(Canton of Zurich) Nora Wüest	0	2	0	1	0	2	0	0	1	X	6
(Aargau) Silvana Tirinzoni 🔨	3	0	2	0	2	0	0	2	0	X	9

==== Draw 10 ====
Friday, February 14, 6:00 pm

Sheet A	1	2	3	4	5	6	7	8	9	10	Final
(Valais) Elena Stern 🔨	0	1	1	0	0	1	0	1	0	X	4
(Canton of Zurich) Nora Wüest	0	0	0	1	0	0	1	0	1	X	3

Sheet B	1	2	3	4	5	6	7	8	9	10	Final
(Canton of Bern) Binia Feltscher	0	0	0	2	0	0	3	0	0	2	7
(Aargau) Silvana Tirinzoni 🔨	2	0	0	0	2	0	0	1	1	0	6

== Finals ==
Final
1	(Valais) Elena Stern	6
2	(Aargau) Silvana Tirinzoni	4

Bronze Medal Game
3	(Canton of Bern) Binia Feltscher	9
4	(Canton of Zurich) Nora Wüest	8

=== Bronze medal game ===
Saturday, February 15, 8:30 am

Sheet A	1	2	3	4	5	6	7	8	9	10	Final
(Canton of Bern) Binia Feltscher 🔨	3	0	1	0	2	0	0	1	1	1	9
(Canton of Zurich) Nora Wüest	0	2	0	2	0	2	2	0	0	0	8

=== Final ===
Saturday, February 15, 5:30 pm

Sheet B	1	2	3	4	5	6	7	8	9	10	Final
(Valais) Elena Stern 🔨	0	2	0	0	1	0	0	2	0	1	6
(Aargau) Silvana Tirinzoni	0	0	0	1	0	2	0	0	1	0	4

2020 Swiss Women's Curling Championship
(Switzerland)
Elena Stern
1st Swiss Championship title
