= 2021 The Challenger (curling) =

- Host city: Basel, Switzerland
- Arena: Curlingzentrum Region Basel
- Dates: September 24–26
- Winner: (Scotland) Team GB Red
- Curling club: National CA, Stirling
- Skip: Eve Muirhead
- Third: Vicky Wright
- Second: Jennifer Dodds
- Lead: Hailey Duff
- Finalist: (Switzerland) Irene Schori

The 2021 The Challenger was held from September 24 to 26 at the Curlingzentrum Region Basel in Basel, Switzerland. The event was held in a round-robin format with a purse of CHF 4,200.

Team GB Red won the event, topping the previously undefeated Irene Schori 7–5 in the final. GB Red consisted of Eve Muirhead, Vicky Wright, Jennifer Dodds and Hailey Duff. Team Schori topped the round robin with a 4–0 record, followed by GB Red, Silvana Tirinzoni and Anna Hasselborg all at 3–1. Schori then defeated Hasselborg 6–4 in one semifinal and Muirhead's team beat Tirinzoni 7–5 in the other. Teams Kaldvee, Raphaela Keiser, Nora Wüest and GB Blue (Gina Aitken) all missed the playoffs.

== Teams ==
The teams are listed as follows:

Skip	Third	Second	Lead	Alternate	Locale
Gina Aitken (Note: As part of the nine-player national squad, Eve Muirhead skipped Team GB Red and Gina Aitken skipped Team GB Blue. Hailey Duff and Lauren Gray also switched teams.)	Lauren Gray	Rebecca Morrison	Mili Smith	Sophie Sinclair	Stirling, Scotland
Anna Hasselborg	Sara McManus	Agnes Knochenhauer	Sofia Mabergs		Sundbyberg, Sweden
Selina Witschonke (Fourth)	Elena Mathis	Raphaela Keiser (Skip)	Marina Lörtscher		St. Moritz, Switzerland
Eve Muirhead	Vicky Wright	Jennifer Dodds	Hailey Duff		Stirling, Scotland
Irene Schori	Carole Howald	Lara Stocker	Stefanie Berset		Langenthal, Switzerland
Alina Pätz (Fourth)	Silvana Tirinzoni (Skip)	Esther Neuenschwander	Melanie Barbezat		Aarau, Switzerland
Kerli Laidsalu (Fourth)	Liisa Turmann (Skip)	Heili Grossmann	Erika Tuvike		Tallinn, Estonia
Ladina Müller (Fourth)	Nora Wüest (Skip)	Anna Stern	Karin Winter	Lisa Gugler	Wetzikon, Switzerland

== Round-robin standings ==
Final round-robin standings

Key
Teams to Playoffs

Team	W	L	PF	PA
(Switzerland) Irene Schori	4	0	27	14
(Scotland) GB Red	3	1	26	13
(Switzerland) Silvana Tirinzoni	3	1	24	20
(Sweden) Anna Hasselborg	3	1	23	12
(Switzerland) Raphaela Keiser	1	3	15	20
(Estonia) Liisa Turmann	1	3	14	23
(Switzerland) Nora Wüest	1	3	21	25
(Scotland) GB Blue	0	4	11	34

== Round-robin results ==
All draw times listed in Central European Time (UTC+01:00).

=== Draw 1 ===
Friday, September 24, 1:00 pm

Sheet 2	1	2	3	4	5	6	7	8	Final
(Sweden) Anna Hasselborg	1	1	2	0	3	0	1	X	8
(Estonia) Liisa Turmann	0	0	0	2	0	2	0	X	4

Sheet 3	1	2	3	4	5	6	7	8	Final
(Switzerland) Irene Schori	1	2	0	0	1	2	2	X	8
(Switzerland) Raphaela Keiser	0	0	2	0	0	0	0	X	2

Sheet 4	1	2	3	4	5	6	7	8	Final
(Switzerland) Nora Wüest	0	2	0	1	0	1	0	2	6
(Switzerland) Silvana Tirinzoni	2	0	2	0	1	0	2	0	7

Sheet 5	1	2	3	4	5	6	7	8	Final
(Scotland) GB Red	2	2	0	2	0	4	X	X	10
(Scotland) GB Blue	0	0	1	0	1	0	X	X	2

=== Draw 2 ===
Friday, September 24, 6:00 pm

Sheet 1	1	2	3	4	5	6	7	8	Final
(Scotland) GB Red	2	0	1	0	1	0	0	2	6
(Switzerland) Raphaela Keiser	0	0	0	2	0	2	1	0	5

Sheet 2	1	2	3	4	5	6	7	8	Final
(Switzerland) Irene Schori	1	0	1	0	2	2	0	1	7
(Switzerland) Silvana Tirinzoni	0	3	0	1	0	0	2	0	6

Sheet 3	1	2	3	4	5	6	7	8	Final
(Sweden) Anna Hasselborg	1	1	0	5	X	X	X	X	7
(Scotland) GB Blue	0	0	1	0	X	X	X	X	1

Sheet 5	1	2	3	4	5	6	7	8	Final
(Switzerland) Nora Wüest	0	0	2	0	0	0	X	X	2
(Estonia) Liisa Turmann	0	1	0	2	4	1	X	X	8

=== Draw 3 ===
Saturday, September 25, 9:00 am

Sheet 1	1	2	3	4	5	6	7	8	Final
(Switzerland) Nora Wüest	2	0	2	0	1	2	4	X	11
(Scotland) GB Blue	0	1	0	2	0	0	0	X	3

Sheet 3	1	2	3	4	5	6	7	8	Final
(Scotland) GB Red	0	1	0	2	0	0	0	X	3
(Switzerland) Silvana Tirinzoni	1	0	1	0	0	1	2	X	5

Sheet 4	1	2	3	4	5	6	7	8	Final
(Sweden) Anna Hasselborg	2	0	0	0	1	1	0	X	4
(Switzerland) Raphaela Keiser	0	0	0	1	0	0	0	X	1

Sheet 5	1	2	3	4	5	6	7	8	Final
(Switzerland) Irene Schori	1	0	2	0	0	3	X	X	6
(Estonia) Liisa Turmann	0	0	0	1	0	0	X	X	1

=== Draw 4 ===
Saturday, September 25, 2:00 pm

Sheet 1	1	2	3	4	5	6	7	8	Final
(Sweden) Anna Hasselborg	0	1	0	2	0	0	1	X	4
(Switzerland) Silvana Tirinzoni	1	0	1	0	3	1	0	X	6

Sheet 2	1	2	3	4	5	6	7	8	Final
(Switzerland) Irene Schori	2	0	0	2	0	0	0	2	6
(Scotland) GB Blue	0	2	0	0	2	1	0	0	5

Sheet 4	1	2	3	4	5	6	7	8	Final
(Scotland) GB Red	1	1	1	2	0	2	X	X	7
(Estonia) Liisa Turmann	0	0	0	0	1	0	X	X	1

Sheet 5	1	2	3	4	5	6	7	8	Final
(Switzerland) Raphaela Keiser	0	2	2	1	0	2	X	X	7
(Switzerland) Nora Wüest	1	0	0	0	1	0	X	X	2

== Playoffs ==
Semifinals
1	(Switzerland) Irene Schori	6
4	(Sweden) Anna Hasselborg	4
2	(Scotland) GB Red	7
3	(Switzerland) Silvana Tirinzoni	5

Final
1	(Switzerland) Irene Schori	5
2	(Scotland) GB Red	7

=== Semifinals ===
Saturday, September 25, 7:00 pm

Sheet 2	1	2	3	4	5	6	7	8	Final
(Switzerland) Irene Schori	1	1	0	0	0	2	1	1	6
(Sweden) Anna Hasselborg	0	0	0	4	0	0	0	0	4

Sheet 4	1	2	3	4	5	6	7	8	Final
(Scotland) GB Red	2	2	0	1	1	0	0	1	7
(Switzerland) Silvana Tirinzoni	0	0	2	0	0	2	1	0	5

=== Final ===
Sunday, September 26, 10:00 am

Sheet 3	1	2	3	4	5	6	7	8	Final
(Switzerland) Irene Schori	0	1	0	0	3	0	1	0	5
(Scotland) GB Red	2	0	1	2	0	1	0	1	7
