= 2015 GSOC Tour Challenge =

Grand Slam of Curling event

- Host city: Paradise, Newfoundland and Labrador
- Arena: Paradise Double Ice Complex
- Dates: September 8–13
- Men's winner: (Alberta) Team Koe
- Curling club: Glencoe CC, Calgary
- Skip: Kevin Koe
- Third: Marc Kennedy
- Second: Brent Laing
- Lead: Ben Hebert
- Finalist: (Newfoundland and Labrador) Brad Gushue
- Women's winner: (Switzerland) Team Tirinzoni
- Curling club: Aarau CC, Aarau
- Skip: Silvana Tirinzoni
- Third: Manuela Siegrist
- Second: Esther Neuenschwander
- Lead: Marlene Albrecht
- Finalist: (Ontario) Rachel Homan

The 2015 GSOC Tour Challenge was held from September 8 to 13 at the Paradise Double Ice Complex in Paradise, Newfoundland and Labrador. It was the first Grand Slam event of the 2015–16 curling season for both the men's and women's World Curling Tour.

In the tier 1 events, Kevin Koe defeated Brad Gushue on the men's side, Koe's fourth slam title. On the women's side, Silvana Tirinzoni won her first slam by upsetting Rachel Homan in the final.

the tier 2 winners Jim Cotter and Kerri Einarson both qualified for the 2015 The Masters Grand Slam of Curling.

The event introduced the curling world to a new kind of sweeping strategy employed by the Gushue rink. Up until this season, most curling teams would use two sweepers for each rock thrown, but the Gushue rink only used one at the Tour Challenge. The thought process by the Gushue team was that having two sweepers would "cancel out" the directional sweeping of each other. The change in sweeping strategy by the team marked the beginning of a tumultuous curling season which led to the banning of new brush head fabrics as part of the "broomgate" scandal.

== Men ==
=== Tier I ===
==== Teams ====
The teams are listed as follows:

Skip	Third	Second	Lead	Locale
Brendan Bottcher	Tom Appelman	Brad Thiessen	Karrick Martin	Edmonton, Alberta
Reid Carruthers	Braeden Moskowy	Derek Samagalski	Colin Hodgson	West St. Paul, Manitoba
Adam Casey	David Mathers	Anson Carmody	Robbie Doherty	Charlottetown, Prince Edward Island
Benoît Schwarz (fourth)	Claudio Pätz	Peter de Cruz (skip)	Valentin Tanner	Geneva, Switzerland
Niklas Edin	Oskar Eriksson	Kristian Lindström	Christoffer Sundgren	Karlstad, Sweden
John Epping	Mathew Camm	Patrick Janssen	Tim March	Toronto, Ontario
Brad Gushue	Mark Nichols	Brett Gallant	Geoff Walker	Newfoundland and Labrador
Glenn Howard	Richard Hart	Adam Spencer	Scott Howard	Penetanguishene, Ontario
Brad Jacobs	Ryan Fry	E. J. Harnden	Ryan Harnden	Sault Ste. Marie, Ontario
Kevin Koe	Marc Kennedy	Brent Laing	Ben Hebert	Calgary, Alberta
Steve Laycock	Kirk Muyres	Colton Flasch	Dallan Muyres	Saskatoon, Saskatchewan
Mike McEwen	B. J. Neufeld	Matt Wozniak	Denni Neufeld	Winnipeg, Manitoba
Sven Michel	Marc Pfister	Enrico Pfister	Simon Gempeler	Adelboden, Switzerland
David Murdoch	Greg Drummond	Scott Andrews	Michael Goodfellow	Stirling, Scotland
John Shuster	Tyler George	Matt Hamilton	John Landsteiner	(United States) Duluth, Minnesota

==== Round-robin standings ====
Final round-robin standings

Key
Teams to Playoffs

Pool A	W	L
(Manitoba) Reid Carruthers	4	0
(Newfoundland and Labrador) Brad Gushue	3	1
(Prince Edward Island) Adam Casey	1	3
(Sweden) Niklas Edin	1	3
(Scotland) David Murdoch	1	3

Pool B	W	L
(Alberta) Kevin Koe	3	1
(Manitoba) Mike McEwen	3	1
(United States) John Shuster	2	2
(Switzerland) Peter de Cruz	1	3
(Ontario) John Epping	1	3

Pool C	W	L
(Alberta) Brendan Bottcher	3	1
(Ontario) Glenn Howard	3	1
(Ontario) Brad Jacobs	3	1
(Saskatchewan) Steve Laycock	1	3
(Switzerland) Sven Michel	0	4

==== Round-robin results ====
All draw times are listed in Newfoundland Time Zone.

===== Draw 1 =====
Tuesday, September 8, 7:00 pm

Sheet A	1	2	3	4	5	6	7	8	Final
(Newfoundland and Labrador) Brad Gushue	0	1	0	0	2	0	0	0	3
(Manitoba) Reid Carruthers 🔨	1	0	0	1	0	1	1	1	5

Sheet C	1	2	3	4	5	6	7	8	9	Final
(Ontario) John Epping	0	1	0	1	0	2	0	0	1	5
(Alberta) Kevin Koe 🔨	0	0	1	0	2	0	0	1	0	4

===== Draw 2 =====
Wednesday, September 9, 9:00 am

Sheet A	1	2	3	4	5	6	7	8	Final
(Alberta) Brendan Bottcher 🔨	2	0	1	2	0	0	1	X	6
(Saskatchewan) Steve Laycock	0	1	0	0	1	2	0	X	4

Sheet B	1	2	3	4	5	6	7	8	Final
(Ontario) Glenn Howard	0	2	1	0	3	0	2	X	8
(Switzerland) Sven Michel 🔨	1	0	0	4	0	1	0	X	6

===== Draw 3 =====
Wednesday, September 9, 12:30 pm

Sheet A	1	2	3	4	5	6	7	8	Final
(Alberta) Kevin Koe 🔨	2	1	1	0	2	0	1	X	7
(United States) John Shuster	0	0	0	2	0	1	0	X	3

Sheet C	1	2	3	4	5	6	7	8	Final
(Manitoba) Mike McEwen 🔨	2	0	0	0	0	0	0	1	3
(Switzerland) Peter de Cruz	0	0	0	1	0	1	0	0	2

Sheet D	1	2	3	4	5	6	7	8	Final
(Sweden) Niklas Edin 🔨	0	1	0	0	1	0	2	0	4
(Scotland) David Murdoch	1	0	0	2	0	2	0	1	6

===== Draw 4 =====
Wednesday, September 9, 4:00 pm

Sheet B	1	2	3	4	5	6	7	8	Final
(Manitoba) Reid Carruthers	0	1	0	0	2	2	0	X	5
(Prince Edward Island) Adam Casey 🔨	1	0	0	1	0	0	1	X	3

Sheet D	1	2	3	4	5	6	7	8	Final
(Ontario) Brad Jacobs 🔨	0	1	0	1	1	0	0	1	4
(Alberta) Brendan Bottcher	0	0	2	0	0	1	0	0	3

===== Draw 5 =====
Wednesday, September 9, 7:30 pm

Sheet B	1	2	3	4	5	6	7	8	Final
(Newfoundland and Labrador) Brad Gushue 🔨	2	0	2	0	3	0	X	X	7
(Scotland) David Murdoch	0	1	0	1	0	1	X	X	3

Sheet D	1	2	3	4	5	6	7	8	Final
(Ontario) John Epping 🔨	1	0	0	2	0	0	2	0	5
(Manitoba) Mike McEwen	0	3	0	0	0	1	0	2	6

Sheet E	1	2	3	4	5	6	7	8	Final
(Saskatchewan) Steve Laycock	0	2	0	3	1	0	0	1	7
(Switzerland) Sven Michel 🔨	1	0	2	0	0	2	1	0	6

===== Draw 6 =====
Thursday, September 10, 9:00 am

Sheet B	1	2	3	4	5	6	7	8	Final
(Manitoba) Mike McEwen 🔨	2	0	2	0	0	1	0	1	6
(United States) John Shuster	0	2	0	0	1	0	2	0	5

Sheet C	1	2	3	4	5	6	7	8	Final
(Sweden) Niklas Edin	1	0	1	0	X	X	X	X	2
(Manitoba) Reid Carruthers 🔨	0	5	0	2	X	X	X	X	7

Sheet E	1	2	3	4	5	6	7	8	Final
(Alberta) Kevin Koe 🔨	1	0	3	0	2	0	0	1	7
(Switzerland) Peter de Cruz	0	1	0	2	0	2	0	0	5

===== Draw 7 =====
Thursday, September 10, 12:30 pm

Sheet A	1	2	3	4	5	6	7	8	Final
(Prince Edward Island) Adam Casey 🔨	4	0	2	0	0	1	0	X	7
(Scotland) David Murdoch	0	0	0	2	1	0	1	X	4

Sheet B	1	2	3	4	5	6	7	8	Final
(Alberta) Brendan Bottcher 🔨	0	0	0	2	0	3	2	X	7
(Switzerland) Sven Michel	0	0	0	0	1	0	0	X	1

Sheet C	1	2	3	4	5	6	7	8	Final
(Ontario) Brad Jacobs 🔨	0	0	1	0	2	0	2	0	5
(Ontario) Glenn Howard	0	0	0	2	0	1	0	3	6

===== Draw 8 =====
Thursday, September 10, 4:00 pm

Sheet B	1	2	3	4	5	6	7	8	Final
(Ontario) John Epping 🔨	2	0	0	0	0	0	X	X	2
(Switzerland) Peter de Cruz	0	2	0	3	0	3	X	X	8

===== Draw 9 =====
Thursday, September 10, 7:30 pm

Sheet A	1	2	3	4	5	6	7	8	Final
(Ontario) Brad Jacobs 🔨	0	2	3	1	X	X	X	X	6
(Switzerland) Sven Michel	0	0	0	0	X	X	X	X	0

Sheet C	1	2	3	4	5	6	7	8	Final
(Newfoundland and Labrador) Brad Gushue	2	1	0	5	X	X	X	X	8
(Prince Edward Island) Adam Casey 🔨	0	0	1	0	X	X	X	X	1

Sheet D	1	2	3	4	5	6	7	8	Final
(Saskatchewan) Steve Laycock 🔨	0	0	1	0	1	0	X	X	2
(Ontario) Glenn Howard	1	0	0	2	0	4	X	X	7

===== Draw 10 =====
Friday, September 11, 9:00 am

Sheet D	1	2	3	4	5	6	7	8	Final
(Sweden) Niklas Edin	0	1	0	3	0	3	0	1	8
(Prince Edward Island) Adam Casey 🔨	1	0	2	0	2	0	1	0	6

Sheet E	1	2	3	4	5	6	7	8	Final
(Ontario) John Epping 🔨	0	0	0	0	1	0	X	X	1
(United States) John Shuster	0	1	1	1	0	2	X	X	5

===== Draw 11 =====
Friday, September 11, 12:30 pm

Sheet B	1	2	3	4	5	6	7	8	Final
(Ontario) Brad Jacobs 🔨	2	0	3	0	2	X	X	X	7
(Saskatchewan) Steve Laycock	0	1	0	1	0	X	X	X	2

Sheet E	1	2	3	4	5	6	7	8	Final
(Ontario) Glenn Howard	0	0	1	1	0	1	0	X	3
(Alberta) Brendan Bottcher 🔨	0	2	0	0	1	0	2	X	5

===== Draw 12 =====
Friday, September 11, 4:00 pm

Sheet A	1	2	3	4	5	6	7	8	Final
(Newfoundland and Labrador) Brad Gushue 🔨	3	0	3	0	2	1	X	X	9
(Sweden) Niklas Edin	0	2	0	3	0	0	X	X	5

Sheet C	1	2	3	4	5	6	7	8	Final
(Alberta) Kevin Koe 🔨	2	0	2	1	0	0	0	0	5
(Manitoba) Mike McEwen	0	1	0	0	2	1	0	0	4

Sheet D	1	2	3	4	5	6	7	8	Final
(United States) John Shuster 🔨	2	0	0	2	0	1	1	X	6
(Switzerland) Peter de Cruz	0	1	1	0	1	0	0	X	3

Sheet E	1	2	3	4	5	6	7	8	Final
(Manitoba) Reid Carruthers 🔨	2	0	1	1	0	2	0	0	6
(Scotland) David Murdoch	0	1	0	0	2	0	1	1	5

==== Playoffs ====
Quarterfinals
1	(Manitoba) Reid Carruthers	4
8	(United States) John Shuster	6
4	(Alberta) Brendan Bottcher	6
5	(Alberta) Kevin Koe	7
2	(Newfoundland and Labrador) Brad Gushue	4
7	(Ontario) Glenn Howard	2
3	(Manitoba) Mike McEwen	6
6	(Ontario) Brad Jacobs	1

Semifinals
8	(United States) John Shuster	4
5	(Alberta) Kevin Koe	9
2	(Newfoundland and Labrador) Brad Gushue	5
3	(Manitoba) Mike McEwen	3

Final
5	(Alberta) Kevin Koe	4
2	(Newfoundland and Labrador) Brad Gushue	3

===== Quarterfinals =====
Saturday, September 12, 11:00 am

Team	1	2	3	4	5	6	7	8	Final
(Manitoba) Reid Carruthers 🔨	2	0	0	0	1	0	1	0	4
(United States) John Shuster	0	0	0	2	0	3	0	1	6

Player percentages
(Manitoba) Team Carruthers		(United States) Team Shuster	
Colin Hodgson	94%	John Landsteiner	78%
Derek Samagalski	99%	Matt Hamilton	93%
Braeden Moskowy	90%	Tyler George	91%
Reid Carruthers	80%	John Shuster	90%
Total	91%	Total	88%

Team	1	2	3	4	5	6	7	8	Final
(Alberta) Brendan Bottcher	0	1	1	2	0	2	0	0	6
(Alberta) Kevin Koe 🔨	1	0	0	0	3	0	2	1	7

Player percentages
(Alberta) Team Bottcher		(Alberta) Team Koe	
Karrick Martin	93%	Ben Hebert	100%
Brad Thiessen	100%	Brent Laing	93%
Tom Appelman	85%	Marc Kennedy	96%
Brendan Bottcher	87%	Kevin Koe	80%
Total	92%	Total	92%

Team	1	2	3	4	5	6	7	8	Final
(Newfoundland and Labrador) Brad Gushue 🔨	0	0	1	0	0	2	0	1	4
(Ontario) Glenn Howard	0	0	0	1	0	0	1	0	2

Player percentages
(Newfoundland and Labrador) Team Gushue		(Ontario) Team Howard	
Geoff Walker	89%	Scott Howard	77%
Brett Gallant	81%	Adam Spencer	94%
Mark Nichols	88%	Richard Hart	78%
Brad Gushue	99%	Glenn Howard	89%
Total	89%	Total	84%

Team	1	2	3	4	5	6	7	8	Final
(Manitoba) Mike McEwen 🔨	1	0	0	3	2	X	X	X	6
(Ontario) Brad Jacobs	0	1	0	0	0	X	X	X	1

Player percentages
(Manitoba) Team McEwen		(Ontario) Team Jacobs	
Denni Neufeld	81%	Ryan Harnden	100%
Matt Wozniak	100%	E. J. Harnden	89%
B. J. Neufeld	91%	Ryan Fry	94%
Mike McEwen	89%	Brad Jacobs	74%
Total	91%	Total	90%

===== Semifinals =====
Saturday, September 12, 7:00 pm

Team	1	2	3	4	5	6	7	8	Final
(United States) John Shuster	0	1	0	0	1	0	X	X	2
(Alberta) Kevin Koe 🔨	1	0	3	1	0	4	X	X	9

Player percentages
(United States) Team Shuster		(Alberta) Team Koe	
John Landsteiner	90%	Ben Hebert	74%
Matt Hamilton	71%	Brent Laing	94%
Tyler George	79%	Marc Kennedy	82%
John Shuster	75%	Kevin Koe	96%
Total	79%	Total	86%

Team	1	2	3	4	5	6	7	8	Final
(Newfoundland and Labrador) Brad Gushue 🔨	2	0	0	1	0	0	2	X	5
(Manitoba) Mike McEwen	0	2	0	0	0	1	0	X	3

Player percentages
(Newfoundland and Labrador) Team Gushue		(Manitoba) Team McEwen	
Geoff Walker	96%	Denni Neufeld	83%
Brett Gallant	86%	Matt Wozniak	74%
Mark Nichols	90%	B. J. Neufeld	93%
Brad Gushue	80%	Mike McEwen	77%
Total	88%	Total	82%

===== Final =====
Sunday, September 13, 6:30 pm

Sheet C	1	2	3	4	5	6	7	8	9	Final
(Alberta) Kevin Koe 🔨	0	0	1	0	1	0	1	0	1	4
(Newfoundland and Labrador) Brad Gushue	0	1	0	0	0	1	0	1	0	3

Player percentages
(Alberta) Team Koe		(Newfoundland and Labrador) Team Gushue	
Ben Hebert	73%	Geoff Walker	96%
Brent Laing	73%	Brett Gallant	93%
Marc Kennedy	78%	Mark Nichols	91%
Kevin Koe	87%	Brad Gushue	84%
Total	78%	Total	91%

=== Tier II ===
==== Round-robin standings ====
Final round-robin standings

Key
Teams to Playoffs
Teams to Tiebreakers

Pool A	W	L
(Ontario) Mark Kean	4	0
(Scotland) Kyle Smith	3	1
(New Brunswick) James Grattan	2	2
(Ontario) Travis Fanset	1	3
(Newfoundland and Labrador) Rick Rowsell	0	4

Pool B	W	L
(Ontario) Greg Balsdon	4	0
(Nova Scotia) Shawn Adams	3	1
(Saskatchewan) Josh Heidt	2	2
(New Brunswick) Rene Comeau	1	3
(Newfoundland and Labrador) Greg Smith	0	4

Pool C	W	L
(British Columbia) Jim Cotter	4	0
(Scotland) Tom Brewster	3	1
(Nova Scotia) Chad Stevens	2	2
(Newfoundland and Labrador) Colin Thomas	1	3
(Newfoundland and Labrador) Andrew Symonds	0	4

==== Tiebreaker ====
Friday, September 11, 8:30 pm

Team	1	2	3	4	5	6	7	8	Final
(New Brunswick) James Grattan	0	0	3	0	3	1	X	X	7
(Saskatchewan) Josh Heidt 🔨	0	1	0	1	0	0	X	X	2

==== Playoffs ====
Quarterfinals
1	(British Columbia) Jim Cotter	5
8	(New Brunswick) James Grattan	4
4	(Nova Scotia) Shawn Adams	2
5	(Scotland) Kyle Smith	9
2	(Ontario) Mark Kean	9
7	(Nova Scotia) Chad Stevens	7
3	(Ontario) Greg Balsdon	4
6	(Scotland) Tom Brewster	7

Semifinals
1	(British Columbia) Jim Cotter	9
5	(Scotland) Kyle Smith	2
2	(Ontario) Mark Kean	6
6	(Scotland) Tom Brewster	4

Final
1	(British Columbia) Jim Cotter	5
2	(Ontario) Mark Kean	3

===== Quarterfinals =====
Saturday, September 12, 11:30 am

Team	1	2	3	4	5	6	7	8	Final
(British Columbia) Jim Cotter 🔨	0	1	0	1	0	1	0	2	5
(New Brunswick) James Grattan	0	0	1	0	1	0	2	0	4

Team	1	2	3	4	5	6	7	8	Final
(Nova Scotia) Shawn Adams 🔨	0	0	1	1	0	0	X	X	2
(Scotland) Kyle Smith	2	0	0	0	5	2	X	X	9

Team	1	2	3	4	5	6	7	8	Final
(Ontario) Mark Kean 🔨	3	0	1	0	2	0	0	3	9
(Nova Scotia) Chad Stevens	0	1	0	2	0	3	1	0	7

Team	1	2	3	4	5	6	7	8	Final
(Ontario) Greg Balsdon 🔨	1	0	2	0	0	1	0	X	4
(Scotland) Tom Brewster	0	2	0	1	3	0	1	X	7

===== Semifinals =====
Saturday, September 12, 7:00 pm

Team	1	2	3	4	5	6	7	8	Final
(British Columbia) Jim Cotter 🔨	2	0	3	0	4	X	X	X	9
(Scotland) Kyle Smith	0	1	0	1	0	X	X	X	2

Team	1	2	3	4	5	6	7	8	Final
(Ontario) Mark Kean 🔨	2	0	1	0	1	1	0	1	6
(Scotland) Tom Brewster	0	2	0	0	0	0	2	0	4

===== Final =====
Sunday, September 13, 6:00 pm

Team	1	2	3	4	5	6	7	8	Final
(British Columbia) Jim Cotter 🔨	1	1	1	0	0	1	0	1	5
(Ontario) Mark Kean	0	0	0	1	1	0	1	0	3

== Women ==
=== Tier I ===
==== Teams ====
The teams are listed as follows:

Skip	Third	Second	Lead	Locale
Chelsea Carey	Amy Nixon	Jocelyn Peterman	Laine Peters	Edmonton, Alberta
Binia Feltscher	Irene Schori	Franziska Kaufmann	Christine Urech	Flims, Switzerland
Tracy Fleury	Crystal Webster	Jenn Horgan	Amanda Gates	Sudbury, Ontario
Julie Hastings	Christy Trombley	Stacey Smith	Katrina Collins	Thornhill, Ontario
Rachel Homan	Emma Miskew	Joanne Courtney	Lisa Weagle	Ottawa, Ontario
Jennifer Jones	Kaitlyn Lawes	Jill Officer	Jennifer Clark-Rouire	Winnipeg, Manitoba
Kim Eun-jung	Kim Kyeong-ae	Kim Seon-yeong	Kim Yeong-mi	Uiseong, South Korea
Kristy McDonald	Kate Cameron	Leslie Wilson-Westcott	Raunora Westcott	Winnipeg, Manitoba
Sherry Middaugh	Jo-Ann Rizzo	Lee Merklinger	Leigh Armstrong	Coldwater, Ontario
Eve Muirhead	Anna Sloan	Vicki Adams	Sarah Reid	Stirling, Scotland
Alina Pätz	Nadine Lehmann	Marisa Winkelhausen	Nicole Schwägli	Zürich, Switzerland
Kelsey Rocque	Laura Crocker	Taylor McDonald	Jen Gates	Edmonton, Alberta
Anna Sidorova	Margarita Fomina	Aleksandra Saitova	Alina Kovaleva	Moscow, Russia
Val Sweeting	Lori Olson-Johns	Dana Ferguson	Rachelle Brown	Edmonton, Alberta
Silvana Tirinzoni	Manuela Siegrist	Esther Neuenschwander	Marlene Albrecht	Aarau, Switzerland

==== Round-robin standings ====
Final round-robin standings

Key
Teams to Playoffs
Teams to Tiebreakers

Pool A	W	L
(Ontario) Sherry Middaugh	3	1
(Manitoba) Kristy McDonald	3	1
(Manitoba) Jennifer Jones	2	2
(Alberta) Chelsea Carey	2	2
(Russia) Anna Sidorova	0	4

Pool B	W	L
(Ontario) Rachel Homan	4	0
(Alberta) Kelsey Rocque	3	1
(Ontario) Julie Hastings	1	3
(Switzerland) Binia Feltscher	1	3
(Alberta) Val Sweeting	1	3

Pool C	W	L
(South Korea) Kim Eun-jung	3	1
(Switzerland) Silvana Tirinzoni	2	2
(Scotland) Eve Muirhead	2	2
(Ontario) Tracy Fleury	2	2
(Switzerland) Alina Pätz	1	3

==== Round-robin results ====
The draw is listed as follows:

===== Draw 1 =====
Tuesday, September 8, 7:00 pm

Sheet B	1	2	3	4	5	6	7	8	Final
(Scotland) Eve Muirhead	1	0	1	1	0	2	0	0	5
(Switzerland) Silvana Tirinzoni 🔨	0	0	0	0	1	0	2	1	4

Sheet D	1	2	3	4	5	6	7	8	9	Final
(Manitoba) Jennifer Jones	0	0	1	0	1	1	0	1	0	4
(Ontario) Sherry Middaugh 🔨	0	2	0	2	0	0	0	0	1	5

Sheet E	1	2	3	4	5	6	7	8	Final
(Alberta) Val Sweeting 🔨	0	1	0	0	3	0	X	X	4
(Alberta) Kelsey Rocque	1	0	4	1	0	3	X	X	9

===== Draw 2 =====
Wednesday, September 9, 9:00 am

Sheet C	1	2	3	4	5	6	7	8	Final
(Ontario) Tracy Fleury	0	4	0	2	0	0	1	X	7
(Switzerland) Alina Pätz 🔨	4	0	2	0	2	3	0	X	11

Sheet D	1	2	3	4	5	6	7	8	9	Final
(Ontario) Rachel Homan	0	3	0	2	0	0	0	1	1	7
(Ontario) Julie Hastings 🔨	2	0	2	0	1	0	1	0	0	6

Sheet E	1	2	3	4	5	6	7	8	Final
(Alberta) Chelsea Carey 🔨	0	2	0	0	3	0	0	1	6
(Russia) Anna Sidorova	0	0	1	1	0	0	1	0	3

===== Draw 3 =====
Wednesday, September 9, 12:30 pm

Sheet B	1	2	3	4	5	6	7	8	Final
(Alberta) Val Sweeting	0	3	0	0	2	0	0	2	7
(Switzerland) Binia Feltscher 🔨	2	0	3	1	0	3	1	0	10

Sheet E	1	2	3	4	5	6	7	8	9	Final
(Manitoba) Jennifer Jones	0	0	4	0	0	1	0	0	0	5
(Manitoba) Kristy McDonald 🔨	0	1	0	1	2	0	0	1	1	6

===== Draw 4 =====
Wednesday, September 9, 4:00 pm

Sheet A	1	2	3	4	5	6	7	8	9	Final
(Scotland) Eve Muirhead 🔨	2	0	1	0	0	2	0	1	0	6
(South Korea) Kim Eun-jung	0	1	0	2	1	0	2	0	2	8

Sheet C	1	2	3	4	5	6	7	8	Final
(Alberta) Kelsey Rocque 🔨	0	3	3	2	0	1	X	X	9
(Ontario) Julie Hastings	1	0	0	0	1	0	X	X	2

===== Draw 5 =====
Wednesday, September 9, 7:30 pm

Sheet A	1	2	3	4	5	6	7	8	Final
(Switzerland) Alina Pätz	0	0	1	0	0	0	X	X	1
(Switzerland) Silvana Tirinzoni 🔨	1	1	0	3	1	1	X	X	7

Sheet C	1	2	3	4	5	6	7	8	Final
(Ontario) Sherry Middaugh	0	0	0	1	0	2	1	X	4
(Russia) Anna Sidorova 🔨	0	1	0	0	0	0	0	X	1

===== Draw 6 =====
Thursday, September 10, 9:00 am

Sheet D	1	2	3	4	5	6	7	8	Final
(Alberta) Chelsea Carey 🔨	1	0	0	2	1	0	1	X	5
(Manitoba) Kristy McDonald	0	0	1	0	0	1	0	X	2

===== Draw 7 =====
Thursday, September 10, 12:30 pm

Sheet D	1	2	3	4	5	6	7	8	9	Final
(Ontario) Tracy Fleury	1	0	1	0	3	0	2	0	1	8
(South Korea) Kim Eun-jung 🔨	0	1	0	2	0	1	0	3	0	7

Sheet E	1	2	3	4	5	6	7	8	Final
(Ontario) Rachel Homan 🔨	0	1	2	0	3	0	2	X	8
(Switzerland) Binia Feltscher	0	0	0	2	0	1	0	X	3

===== Draw 8 =====
Thursday, September 10, 4:00 pm

Sheet A	1	2	3	4	5	6	7	8	Final
(Manitoba) Jennifer Jones	0	2	2	0	1	1	1	X	7
(Russia) Anna Sidorova 🔨	2	0	0	1	0	0	0	X	3

Sheet C	1	2	3	4	5	6	7	8	Final
(Scotland) Eve Muirhead 🔨	1	0	1	0	5	X	X	X	7
(Switzerland) Alina Pätz	0	0	0	1	0	X	X	X	1

Sheet D	1	2	3	4	5	6	7	8	Final
(Alberta) Val Sweeting	1	3	0	3	0	1	X	X	8
(Ontario) Julie Hastings 🔨	0	0	1	0	2	0	X	X	3

Sheet E	1	2	3	4	5	6	7	8	Final
(Ontario) Sherry Middaugh 🔨	0	1	0	2	0	1	1	0	5
(Alberta) Chelsea Carey	0	0	2	0	1	0	0	1	4

===== Draw 9 =====
Thursday, September 10, 7:30 pm

Sheet B	1	2	3	4	5	6	7	8	Final
(Alberta) Kelsey Rocque	0	0	0	0	X	X	X	X	0
(Ontario) Rachel Homan 🔨	1	2	1	3	X	X	X	X	7

Sheet E	1	2	3	4	5	6	7	8	9	Final
(Switzerland) Silvana Tirinzoni	0	3	0	3	0	0	0	1	2	9
(Ontario) Tracy Fleury 🔨	2	0	2	0	1	1	1	0	0	7

===== Draw 10 =====
Friday, September 11, 9:00 am

Sheet A	1	2	3	4	5	6	7	8	Final
(Alberta) Kelsey Rocque	0	0	2	0	3	1	0	X	6
(Switzerland) Binia Feltscher 🔨	1	1	0	1	0	0	1	X	4

Sheet C	1	2	3	4	5	6	7	8	Final
(Switzerland) Silvana Tirinzoni	0	2	0	2	0	0	1	X	5
(South Korea) Kim Eun-jung 🔨	3	0	1	0	2	3	0	X	9

===== Draw 11 =====
Friday, September 11, 12:30 pm

Sheet A	1	2	3	4	5	6	7	8	Final
(Ontario) Sherry Middaugh	0	1	0	1	0	2	1	0	5
(Manitoba) Kristy McDonald 🔨	2	0	2	0	2	0	0	1	7

Sheet C	1	2	3	4	5	6	7	8	Final
(Manitoba) Jennifer Jones	2	0	1	0	0	2	0	2	7
(Alberta) Chelsea Carey 🔨	0	1	0	1	1	0	3	0	6

Sheet D	1	2	3	4	5	6	7	8	Final
(Ontario) Tracy Fleury 🔨	1	1	0	3	0	2	0	2	9
(Scotland) Eve Muirhead	0	0	2	0	2	0	1	0	5

===== Draw 12 =====
Friday, September 11, 4:00 pm

Sheet B	1	2	3	4	5	6	7	8	Final
(Ontario) Julie Hastings	0	2	2	0	0	1	2	0	7
(Switzerland) Binia Feltscher 🔨	1	0	0	1	1	0	0	1	4

===== Draw 13 =====
Friday, September 11, 7:30 pm

Sheet B	1	2	3	4	5	6	7	8	Final
(Russia) Anna Sidorova 🔨	0	1	0	0	0	1	0	1	3
(Manitoba) Kristy McDonald	1	0	0	0	2	0	1	0	4

Sheet C	1	2	3	4	5	6	7	8	Final
(Alberta) Val Sweeting	0	0	0	0	1	0	1	X	2
(Ontario) Rachel Homan 🔨	0	2	1	0	0	3	0	X	6

Sheet D	1	2	3	4	5	6	7	8	Final
(Switzerland) Alina Pätz	0	0	2	0	0	2	1	0	5
(South Korea) Kim Eun-jung 🔨	0	2	0	2	3	0	0	1	8

==== Tiebreakers ====
Saturday, September 12, 8:00 am

Team	1	2	3	4	5	6	7	8	Final
(Manitoba) Jennifer Jones	1	0	0	2	0	1	0	0	4
(Scotland) Eve Muirhead 🔨	0	2	0	0	1	0	1	1	5

Player percentages
(Manitoba) Team Jones		(Scotland) Team Muirhead	
Jennifer Clark-Rouire	98%	Sarah Reid	79%
Jill Officer	61%	Vicki Adams	61%
Kaitlyn Lawes	77%	Anna Sloan	76%
Jennifer Jones	78%	Eve Muirhead	83%
Total	79%	Total	75%

Team	1	2	3	4	5	6	7	8	Final
(Alberta) Chelsea Carey 🔨	1	0	1	0	2	0	0	0	4
(Ontario) Tracy Fleury	0	1	0	2	0	1	0	1	5

Player percentages
(Alberta) Team Carey		(Ontario) Team Fleury	
Laine Peters	86%	Amanda Gates	88%
Jocelyn Peterman	88%	Jenn Horgan	84%
Amy Nixon	90%	Crystal Webster	76%
Chelsea Carey	72%	Tracy Fleury	80%
Total	84%	Total	82%

==== Playoffs ====
Quarterfinals
1	(Ontario) Rachel Homan	7
8	(Scotland) Eve Muirhead	3
4	(South Korea) Kim Eun-jung	7
5	(Manitoba) Kristy McDonald	2
2	(Ontario) Sherry Middaugh	4
7	(Ontario) Tracy Fleury	6
3	(Alberta) Kelsey Rocque	1
6	(Switzerland) Silvana Tirinzoni	6

Semifinals
1	(Ontario) Rachel Homan	6
4	(South Korea) Kim Eun-jung	3
7	(Ontario) Tracy Fleury	7
6	(Switzerland) Silvana Tirinzoni	9

Final
1	(Ontario) Rachel Homan	5
6	(Switzerland) Silvana Tirinzoni	6

===== Quarterfinals =====
Saturday, September 12, 2:30 pm

Team	1	2	3	4	5	6	7	8	Final
(Ontario) Rachel Homan 🔨	0	3	0	1	0	2	0	1	7
(Scotland) Eve Muirhead	0	0	1	0	1	0	1	0	3

Player percentages
(Ontario) Team Homan		(Scotland) Team Muirhead	
Lisa Weagle	77%	Sarah Reid	97%
Joanne Courtney	82%	Vicki Adams	84%
Emma Miskew	87%	Anna Sloan	58%
Rachel Homan	89%	Eve Muirhead	78%
Total	84%	Total	79%

Team	1	2	3	4	5	6	7	8	Final
(South Korea) Kim Eun-jung	0	2	0	3	0	1	1	X	7
(Manitoba) Kristy McDonald 🔨	1	0	1	0	0	0	0	X	2

Player percentages
(South Korea) Team Kim		(Manitoba) Team McDonald	
Kim Yeong-mi	84%	Raunora Westcott	83%
Kim Seon-yeong	67%	Leslie Wilson-Westcott	67%
Kim Kyeong-ae	100%	Kate Cameron	87%
Kim Eun-jung	97%	Kristy McDonald	59%
Total	87%	Total	74%

Team	1	2	3	4	5	6	7	8	Final
(Ontario) Sherry Middaugh 🔨	0	0	0	2	1	0	1	0	4
(Ontario) Tracy Fleury	0	2	1	0	0	2	0	1	6

Player percentages
(Ontario) Team Middaugh		(Ontario) Team Fleury	
Leigh Armstrong	88%	Amanda Gates	55%
Lee Merklinger	84%	Jenn Horgan	77%
Jo-Ann Rizzo	72%	Crystal Webster	78%
Sherry Middaugh	57%	Tracy Fleury	76%
Total	75%	Total	72%

Team	1	2	3	4	5	6	7	8	Final
(Alberta) Kelsey Rocque 🔨	0	0	0	0	1	0	0	X	1
(Switzerland) Silvana Tirinzoni	0	2	1	1	0	1	1	X	6

Player percentages
(Alberta) Team Rocque		(Switzerland) Team Tirinzoni	
Jen Gates	65%	Marlene Albrecht	82%
Taylor McDonald	62%	Esther Neuenschwander	80%
Laura Crocker	69%	Manuela Siegrist	92%
Kelsey Rocque	54%	Silvana Tirinzoni	77%
Total	63%	Total	83%

===== Semifinals =====
Saturday, September 12, 5:30 pm

Team	1	2	3	4	5	6	7	8	Final
(Ontario) Rachel Homan 🔨	1	0	2	1	0	2	0	X	6
(South Korea) Kim Eun-jung	0	1	0	0	1	0	1	X	3

Player percentages
(Ontario) Team Homan		(South Korea) Team Kim	
Lisa Weagle	71%	Kim Yeong-mi	82%
Joanne Courtney	86%	Kim Seon-yeong	70%
Emma Miskew	76%	Kim Kyeong-ae	68%
Rachel Homan	84%	Kim Eun-jung	86%
Total	79%	Total	76%

Team	1	2	3	4	5	6	7	8	Final
(Ontario) Tracy Fleury	0	3	0	0	1	0	3	0	7
(Switzerland) Silvana Tirinzoni 🔨	3	0	2	1	0	2	0	1	9

Player percentages
(Ontario) Team Fleury		(Switzerland) Team Tirinzoni	
Amanda Gates	80%	Marlene Albrecht	75%
Jenn Horgan	76%	Esther Neuenschwander	83%
Crystal Webster	85%	Manuela Siegrist	95%
Tracy Fleury	77%	Silvana Tirinzoni	83%
Total	80%	Total	84%

===== Final =====
Sunday, September 13, 11:30 am

Sheet C	1	2	3	4	5	6	7	8	Final
(Ontario) Rachel Homan 🔨	0	3	0	1	0	1	0	0	5
(Switzerland) Silvana Tirinzoni	0	0	1	0	1	0	2	2	6

Player percentages
(Ontario) Team Homan		(Switzerland) Team Tirinzoni	
Lisa Weagle	58%	Marlene Albrecht	91%
Joanne Courtney	72%	Esther Neuenschwander	82%
Emma Miskew	93%	Manuela Siegrist	63%
Rachel Homan	80%	Silvana Tirinzoni	74%
Total	76%	Total	78%

=== Tier II ===
==== Round-robin standings ====
Final round-robin standings

Key
Teams to Playoffs
Teams to Tiebreakers

Pool A	W	L
(Prince Edward Island) Suzanne Birt	2	2
(New Brunswick) Sylvie Robichaud	2	2
(Manitoba) Cathy Overton-Clapham	2	2
(United States) Nina Roth	2	2
(Manitoba) Michelle Montford	2	2

Pool B	W	L
(Manitoba) Kerri Einarson	4	0
(Ontario) Jill Thurston	3	1
(Sweden) Anna Hasselborg	1	3
(Nova Scotia) Mary-Anne Arsenault	1	3
(Newfoundland and Labrador) Heather Strong	1	3

Pool C	W	L
(Manitoba) Barb Spencer	4	0
(United States) Jamie Sinclair	3	1
(Saskatchewan) Amber Holland	2	2
(Newfoundland and Labrador) Stacie Curtis	1	3
(Sweden) Cissi Östlund	0	4

==== Tiebreakers ====
Saturday, September 12, 8:30 am

Team	1	2	3	4	5	6	7	8	Final
(Manitoba) Cathy Overton-Clapham	1	0	0	1	1	0	0	X	3
(Manitoba) Michelle Montford 🔨	0	3	3	0	0	1	1	X	8

Team	1	2	3	4	5	6	7	8	Final
(Saskatchewan) Amber Holland 🔨	1	0	1	0	3	3	0	X	8
(United States) Nina Roth	0	2	0	1	0	0	1	X	4

==== Playoffs ====
Quarterfinals
1	(Manitoba) Kerri Einarson	8
8	(Manitoba) Michelle Montford	1
4	(Manitoba) Jill Thurston	8
5	(Prince Edward Island) Suzanne Birt	5
2	(Manitoba) Barb Spencer	3
7	(Saskatchewan) Amber Holland	9
3	(United States) Jamie Sinclair	5
6	(New Brunswick) Sylvie Robichaud	4

Semifinals
1	(Manitoba) Kerri Einarson	7
4	(Manitoba) Jill Thurston	6
7	(Saskatchewan) Amber Holland	7
3	(United States) Jamie Sinclair	4

Final
1	(Manitoba) Kerri Einarson	8
7	(Saskatchewan) Amber Holland	2

===== Quarterfinals =====
Saturday, September 12, 3:00 pm

Team	1	2	3	4	5	6	7	8	Final
(Manitoba) Kerri Einarson 🔨	2	0	3	1	2	X	X	X	8
(Manitoba) Michelle Montford	0	1	0	0	0	X	X	X	1

Team	1	2	3	4	5	6	7	8	Final
(Manitoba) Jill Thurston 🔨	3	0	1	0	1	0	3	X	8
(Prince Edward Island) Suzanne Birt	0	1	0	2	0	2	0	X	5

Team	1	2	3	4	5	6	7	8	Final
(Manitoba) Barb Spencer 🔨	0	0	0	1	1	0	1	0	3
(Saskatchewan) Amber Holland	0	0	1	0	0	3	0	5	9

Team	1	2	3	4	5	6	7	8	Final
(United States) Jamie Sinclair 🔨	1	1	0	0	2	0	0	1	5
(New Brunswick) Sylvie Robichaud	0	0	0	3	0	0	1	0	4

===== Semifinals =====
Saturday, September 12, 7:00 pm

Team	1	2	3	4	5	6	7	8	9	Final
(Manitoba) Kerri Einarson 🔨	2	0	2	0	0	0	0	2	1	7
(Manitoba) Jill Thurston	0	1	0	2	2	0	1	0	0	6

Team	1	2	3	4	5	6	7	8	Final
(Saskatchewan) Amber Holland 🔨	1	0	1	2	1	0	0	2	7
(United States) Jamie Sinclair	0	2	0	0	0	1	1	0	4

===== Final =====
Sunday, September 13, 11:30 am

Team	1	2	3	4	5	6	7	8	Final
(Manitoba) Kerri Einarson 🔨	2	1	0	1	0	3	1	X	8
(Saskatchewan) Amber Holland	0	0	1	0	1	0	0	X	2
