= 2019 Changan Ford International Curling Elite =

World Curling Tour event

- Host city: Xining, Qinghai, China
- Dates: December 5-10
- Men's winner: United States
- Curling club: St. Paul CC, Minneapolis
- Skip: Rich Ruohonen
- Fourth: Greg Persinger
- Second: Colin Hufman
- Lead: Phil Tilker
- Finalist: Netherlands (van Dorp)
- Women's winner: Russia
- Curling club: Adamant CC, Saint Petersburg
- Skip: Alina Kovaleva
- Third: Maria Komarova
- Second: Galina Arsenkina
- Lead: Ekaterina Kuzmina
- Finalist: South Korea (Kim)

The 2019 Changan Ford International Curling Elite was held from December 5 to 10 in Xining, Qinghai, China. The total purse for the event was CNY 225,000.

In the men's final, Team Ruohonen from the United States defeated Team van Dorp from the Netherlands 5-4. Team Kim from Korea won the bronze medal with a 7-3 win over Canada's Team Horgan.

In the women's final, Team Kovaleva from Russia beat Team Kim from Korea 6-4. Switzerland's Team Feltscher won the bronze medal game 7-5 against the 2019 Pacific-Asia Curling Championships winner Team Han from China.

== Men ==
=== Teams ===
The teams are listed as follows:

| Skip | Third | Second | Lead | Locale |
|---|---|---|---|---|
| Sergey Glukhov | Dmitry Mironov | Evgeny Klimov | Anton Kalalb | Sochi, Russia |
| Tanner Horgan | Colton Lott | Kyle Doering | Tanner Lott | Winnipeg Beach, Manitoba, Canada |
| Kim Chang-min | Lee Ki-jeong | Kim Hak-kyun | Lee Ki-bok | Uiseong, South Korea |
| Patric Mabergs (Fourth) | Fredrik Nyman (Skip) | Fredrik Calrsen | Johannes Patz | Stockholm, Sweden |
| Greg Persinger (Fourth) | Rich Ruohonen (Skip) | Colin Hufman | Phil Tilker | Minneapolis, Minnesota, United States |
| Andrin Schnider | Oliver Widmer | Nicola Stoll | Fabian Schmid | St. Gallen, Switzerland |
| Wouter Gösgens (Fourth) | Jaap van Dorp (Skip) | Laurens Hoekman | Carlo Glasbergen | Zoetermeer, Netherlands |
| Zou Qiang | Wang Zhiyu | Tian Jiafeng | Xu Jingtao | Beijing, China |

=== Round-robin standings ===
Final round-robin standings

Key
| Teams to Playoffs |

| Team | W | L |
|---|---|---|
| (South Korea) Kim Chang-min | 6 | 1 |
| (United States) Rich Ruohonen | 5 | 2 |
| (Canada) Tanner Horgan | 4 | 3 |
| (Netherlands) Jaap van Dorp | 4 | 3 |
| (Sweden) Fredrik Nyman | 4 | 3 |
| (Switzerland) Andrin Schnider | 3 | 4 |
| (China) Zou Qiang | 2 | 5 |
| (Russia) Sergey Glukhov | 0 | 7 |

=== Round-robin results ===
All draw times are listed in China Standard Time (UTC+08:00).

==== Draw 1 ====
Thursday, December 5, 09:30

| Sheet A | 1 | 2 | 3 | 4 | 5 | 6 | 7 | 8 | Final |
| (Sweden) Fredrik Nyman | 2 | 0 | 2 | 0 | 0 | 0 | 1 | 1 | 6 |
| (Russia) Sergey Glukhov | 0 | 2 | 0 | 1 | 0 | 0 | 0 | 0 | 3 |

| Sheet B | 1 | 2 | 3 | 4 | 5 | 6 | 7 | 8 | Final |
| (China) Zou Qiang | 1 | 0 | 0 | 2 | 2 | 0 | 1 | X | 6 |
| (United States) Rich Ruohonen | 0 | 0 | 1 | 0 | 0 | 0 | 0 | X | 1 |

| Sheet C | 1 | 2 | 3 | 4 | 5 | 6 | 7 | 8 | 9 | Final |
| (Canada) Tanner Horgan | 0 | 0 | 2 | 0 | 0 | 1 | 0 | 1 | 0 | 4 |
| (South Korea) Kim Chang-min | 0 | 1 | 0 | 1 | 0 | 0 | 2 | 0 | 1 | 5 |

| Sheet D | 1 | 2 | 3 | 4 | 5 | 6 | 7 | 8 | Final |
| (Switzerland) Andrin Schnider | 0 | 0 | 0 | 0 | 0 | 0 | 0 | 0 | 0 |
| (Netherlands) Jaap van Dorp | 0 | 0 | 0 | 0 | 1 | 0 | 0 | 1 | 2 |

==== Draw 2 ====
Thursday, December 5, 18:30

| Sheet A | 1 | 2 | 3 | 4 | 5 | 6 | 7 | 8 | Final |
| (South Korea) Kim Chang-min | 0 | 3 | 0 | 1 | 0 | 2 | 0 | 1 | 7 |
| (Netherlands) Jaap van Dorp | 1 | 0 | 1 | 0 | 1 | 0 | 2 | 0 | 5 |

| Sheet B | 1 | 2 | 3 | 4 | 5 | 6 | 7 | 8 | Final |
| (Canada) Tanner Horgan | 1 | 2 | 0 | 0 | 2 | 0 | 1 | X | 6 |
| (Switzerland) Andrin Schnider | 0 | 0 | 0 | 1 | 0 | 1 | 0 | X | 2 |

| Sheet C | 1 | 2 | 3 | 4 | 5 | 6 | 7 | 8 | Final |
| (Russia) Sergey Glukhov | 1 | 0 | 1 | 1 | 0 | 1 | 0 | X | 4 |
| (United States) Rich Ruohonen | 0 | 2 | 0 | 0 | 2 | 0 | 2 | X | 6 |

| Sheet D | 1 | 2 | 3 | 4 | 5 | 6 | 7 | 8 | Final |
| (Sweden) Fredrik Nyman | 1 | 0 | 0 | 2 | 2 | 1 | 0 | X | 6 |
| (China) Zou Qiang | 0 | 1 | 1 | 0 | 0 | 0 | 1 | X | 3 |

==== Draw 3 ====
Friday, December 6, 14:00

| Sheet A | 1 | 2 | 3 | 4 | 5 | 6 | 7 | 8 | Final |
| (Canada) Tanner Horgan | 1 | 0 | 0 | 1 | 0 | 1 | 0 | X | 3 |
| (United States) Rich Ruohonen | 0 | 4 | 1 | 0 | 0 | 0 | 3 | X | 8 |

| Sheet B | 1 | 2 | 3 | 4 | 5 | 6 | 7 | 8 | Final |
| (Sweden) Fredrik Nyman | 1 | 0 | 2 | 0 | 0 | 0 | 2 | 0 | 5 |
| (Netherlands) Jaap van Dorp | 0 | 1 | 0 | 0 | 0 | 1 | 0 | 1 | 3 |

| Sheet C | 1 | 2 | 3 | 4 | 5 | 6 | 7 | 8 | Final |
| (Switzerland) Andrin Schnider | 0 | 4 | 1 | 0 | 1 | 0 | 0 | 1 | 7 |
| (China) Zou Qiang | 1 | 0 | 0 | 1 | 0 | 1 | 1 | 0 | 4 |

| Sheet D | 1 | 2 | 3 | 4 | 5 | 6 | 7 | 8 | Final |
| (Russia) Sergey Glukhov | 0 | 0 | 2 | 0 | 2 | 0 | 0 | X | 4 |
| (South Korea) Kim Chang-min | 2 | 1 | 0 | 2 | 0 | 1 | 3 | X | 9 |

==== Draw 4 ====
Saturday, December 7, 09:30

| Sheet A | 1 | 2 | 3 | 4 | 5 | 6 | 7 | 8 | Final |
| (China) Zou Qiang | 1 | 0 | 0 | 1 | 0 | 1 | 0 | X | 3 |
| (South Korea) Kim Chang-min | 0 | 1 | 1 | 0 | 1 | 0 | 4 | X | 7 |

| Sheet B | 1 | 2 | 3 | 4 | 5 | 6 | 7 | 8 | Final |
| (Switzerland) Andrin Schnider | 0 | 2 | 0 | 2 | 0 | 2 | 0 | X | 6 |
| (Russia) Sergey Glukhov | 1 | 0 | 1 | 0 | 1 | 0 | 1 | X | 4 |

| Sheet C | 1 | 2 | 3 | 4 | 5 | 6 | 7 | 8 | Final |
| (Sweden) Fredrik Nyman | 0 | 0 | 1 | 0 | 2 | 0 | 2 | X | 5 |
| (Canada) Tanner Horgan | 0 | 3 | 0 | 2 | 0 | 2 | 0 | X | 7 |

| Sheet D | 1 | 2 | 3 | 4 | 5 | 6 | 7 | 8 | Final |
| (Netherlands) Jaap van Dorp | 0 | 0 | 1 | 0 | 2 | 1 | 0 | X | 4 |
| (United States) Rich Ruohonen | 3 | 1 | 0 | 4 | 0 | 0 | 2 | X | 10 |

==== Draw 5 ====
Saturday, December 7, 18:30

| Sheet A | 1 | 2 | 3 | 4 | 5 | 6 | 7 | 8 | Final |
| (Switzerland) Andrin Schnider | 0 | 3 | 0 | 3 | 0 | 0 | 2 | 0 | 8 |
| (Sweden) Fredrik Nyman | 1 | 0 | 2 | 0 | 1 | 1 | 0 | 1 | 6 |

| Sheet B | 1 | 2 | 3 | 4 | 5 | 6 | 7 | 8 | Final |
| (United States) Rich Ruohonen | 0 | 0 | 0 | 1 | 0 | 2 | 0 | X | 3 |
| (South Korea) Kim Chang-min | 3 | 0 | 1 | 0 | 1 | 0 | 2 | X | 7 |

| Sheet C | 1 | 2 | 3 | 4 | 5 | 6 | 7 | 8 | Final |
| (China) Zou Qiang | 0 | 1 | 1 | 1 | 0 | 0 | 0 | X | 3 |
| (Netherlands) Jaap van Dorp | 3 | 0 | 0 | 0 | 0 | 2 | 1 | X | 6 |

| Sheet D | 1 | 2 | 3 | 4 | 5 | 6 | 7 | 8 | Final |
| (Canada) Tanner Horgan | 1 | 1 | 0 | 2 | 0 | 0 | 1 | 0 | 5 |
| (Russia) Sergey Glukhov | 0 | 0 | 2 | 0 | 0 | 1 | 0 | 1 | 4 |

==== Draw 6 ====
Sunday, December 8, 14:00

| Sheet A | 1 | 2 | 3 | 4 | 5 | 6 | 7 | 8 | Final |
| (Russia) Sergey Glukhov | 0 | 2 | 0 | 1 | 0 | 0 | 1 | X | 4 |
| (China) Zou Qiang | 3 | 0 | 2 | 0 | 2 | 1 | 0 | X | 8 |

| Sheet B | 1 | 2 | 3 | 4 | 5 | 6 | 7 | 8 | Final |
| (Netherlands) Jaap van Dorp | 0 | 0 | 2 | 0 | 2 | 3 | 0 | X | 7 |
| (Canada) Tanner Horgan | 2 | 0 | 0 | 1 | 0 | 0 | 2 | X | 5 |

| Sheet C | 1 | 2 | 3 | 4 | 5 | 6 | 7 | 8 | Final |
| (United States) Rich Ruohonen | 0 | 1 | 0 | 3 | 0 | 0 | 1 | 1 | 6 |
| (Sweden) Fredrik Nyman | 0 | 0 | 1 | 0 | 2 | 1 | 0 | 0 | 4 |

| Sheet D | 1 | 2 | 3 | 4 | 5 | 6 | 7 | 8 | Final |
| (South Korea) Kim Chang-min | 0 | 3 | 1 | 2 | 0 | 0 | 3 | X | 9 |
| (Switzerland) Andrin Schnider | 0 | 0 | 0 | 0 | 2 | 1 | 0 | X | 3 |

==== Draw 7 ====
Monday, December 9, 09:30

| Sheet A | 1 | 2 | 3 | 4 | 5 | 6 | 7 | 8 | Final |
| (United States) Rich Ruohonen | 1 | 1 | 0 | 0 | 0 | 2 | 0 | 2 | 6 |
| (Switzerland) Andrin Schnider | 0 | 0 | 1 | 0 | 1 | 0 | 1 | 0 | 3 |

| Sheet B | 1 | 2 | 3 | 4 | 5 | 6 | 7 | 8 | Final |
| (South Korea) Kim Chang-min | 0 | 0 | 0 | 0 | 0 | 1 | 0 | X | 1 |
| (Sweden) Fredrik Nyman | 0 | 0 | 1 | 1 | 0 | 0 | 2 | X | 4 |

| Sheet C | 1 | 2 | 3 | 4 | 5 | 6 | 7 | 8 | Final |
| (Netherlands) Jaap van Dorp | 3 | 1 | 0 | 2 | 0 | 1 | 1 | X | 8 |
| (Russia) Sergey Glukhov | 0 | 0 | 1 | 0 | 1 | 0 | 0 | X | 2 |

| Sheet D | 1 | 2 | 3 | 4 | 5 | 6 | 7 | 8 | Final |
| (China) Zou Qiang | 0 | 1 | 0 | 0 | 0 | 2 | 0 | 0 | 3 |
| (Canada) Tanner Horgan | 1 | 0 | 2 | 0 | 0 | 0 | 0 | 2 | 5 |

=== Playoffs ===
Semifinals
1 | (South Korea) Kim Chang-min | 4
4 | (Netherlands) Jaap van Dorp | 7
2 | (United States) Rich Ruohonen | 6
3 | (Canada) Tanner Horgan | 3

Final
4 | (Netherlands) Jaap van Dorp | 4
2 | (United States) Rich Ruohonen | 5

| Bronze-medal game |
| 1 | (South Korea) Kim Chang-min | 7 |
| 3 | (Canada) Tanner Horgan | 3 |

==== Semifinals ====
Monday, December 9, 19:30

| Sheet A | 1 | 2 | 3 | 4 | 5 | 6 | 7 | 8 | Final |
| (South Korea) Kim Chang-min | 2 | 0 | 1 | 0 | 0 | 1 | 0 | 0 | 4 |
| (Netherlands) Jaap van Dorp | 0 | 1 | 0 | 2 | 1 | 0 | 2 | 1 | 7 |

| Sheet B | 1 | 2 | 3 | 4 | 5 | 6 | 7 | 8 | Final |
| (United States) Rich Ruohonen | 1 | 0 | 1 | 1 | 0 | 1 | 2 | X | 6 |
| (Canada) Tanner Horgan | 0 | 1 | 0 | 0 | 2 | 0 | 0 | X | 3 |

==== Bronze-medal game ====
Tuesday, December 10, 09:30

| Sheet A | 1 | 2 | 3 | 4 | 5 | 6 | 7 | 8 | Final |
| (South Korea) Kim Chang-min | 3 | 0 | 2 | 0 | 2 | 0 | X | X | 7 |
| (Canada) Tanner Horgan | 0 | 1 | 0 | 1 | 0 | 1 | X | X | 3 |

==== Final ====
Tuesday, December 10, 09:30

| Sheet C | 1 | 2 | 3 | 4 | 5 | 6 | 7 | 8 | Final |
| (Netherlands) Jaap van Dorp | 0 | 0 | 0 | 0 | 3 | 0 | 1 | 0 | 4 |
| (United States) Rich Ruohonen | 0 | 0 | 1 | 1 | 0 | 2 | 0 | 1 | 5 |

== Women ==
=== Teams ===
The teams are listed as follows:

| Skip | Third | Second | Lead | Locale |
|---|---|---|---|---|
| Susan Dudt | Sydney Mullaney | Delaney Strouse | Rebecca Rodgers | Malvern, Pennsylvania, United States |
| Binia Feltscher | Carole Howald | Stefanie Berset | Larissa Hari | Langenthal, Switzerland |
| Han Yu | Zhang Lijun | Jiang Xindi | Zhao Ruiyi | Beijing, China |
| Daniela Jentsch | Emira Abbes | Klara-Hermine Fomm | Analena Jentsch | Füssen, Germany |
| Kim Eun-jung | Kim Kyeong-ae | Kim Seon-yeong | Kim Yeong-mi | Uiseong, South Korea |
| Alina Kovaleva | Maria Komarova | Galina Arsenkina | Ekaterina Kuzmina | Saint Petersburg, Russia |
| Triin Madisson | Britta Sillaots | Kaidi Elmik | Gerli Kagi | Tallinn, Estonia |
| Kayla Skrlik | Lindsay Makichuk | Brittany Tran | Hope Sunley | Calgary, Alberta, Canada |

=== Round-robin standings ===
Final round-robin standings

Key
| Teams to Playoffs |

| Team | W | L |
|---|---|---|
| (China) Han Yu | 6 | 1 |
| (Russia) Alina Kovaleva | 5 | 2 |
| (Switzerland) Binia Feltscher | 5 | 2 |
| (South Korea) Kim Eun-jung | 4 | 3 |
| (Germany) Daniela Jentsch | 4 | 3 |
| (Estonia) Triin Madisson | 2 | 5 |
| (Canada) Kayla Skrlik | 2 | 5 |
| (United States) Susan Dudt | 0 | 7 |

=== Round-robin results ===
All draw times are listed in China Standard Time (UTC+08:00).

==== Draw 1 ====
Thursday, December 5, 14:00

| Sheet A | 1 | 2 | 3 | 4 | 5 | 6 | 7 | 8 | Final |
| (United States) Susan Dudt | 0 | 0 | 0 | 1 | 0 | 0 | 3 | 0 | 4 |
| (Germany) Daniela Jentsch | 2 | 0 | 2 | 0 | 1 | 1 | 0 | 1 | 7 |

| Sheet B | 1 | 2 | 3 | 4 | 5 | 6 | 7 | 8 | Final |
| (Estonia) Triin Madisson | 0 | 3 | 0 | 1 | 0 | 1 | 0 | X | 5 |
| (South Korea) Kim Eun-jung | 1 | 0 | 3 | 0 | 1 | 0 | 5 | X | 10 |

| Sheet C | 1 | 2 | 3 | 4 | 5 | 6 | 7 | 8 | Final |
| (Switzerland) Binia Feltscher | 0 | 0 | 0 | 0 | 2 | 2 | 0 | 0 | 4 |
| (China) Han Yu | 0 | 2 | 1 | 1 | 0 | 0 | 1 | 2 | 7 |

| Sheet D | 1 | 2 | 3 | 4 | 5 | 6 | 7 | 8 | Final |
| (Canada) Kayla Skrlik | 0 | 1 | 0 | 2 | 0 | 0 | 0 | X | 3 |
| (Russia) Alina Kovaleva | 2 | 0 | 1 | 0 | 0 | 0 | 2 | X | 5 |

==== Draw 2 ====
Friday, December 6, 09:30

| Sheet A | 1 | 2 | 3 | 4 | 5 | 6 | 7 | 8 | Final |
| (China) Han Yu | 0 | 1 | 0 | 1 | 0 | 0 | 0 | 2 | 4 |
| (Russia) Alina Kovaleva | 0 | 0 | 2 | 0 | 0 | 1 | 0 | 0 | 3 |

| Sheet B | 1 | 2 | 3 | 4 | 5 | 6 | 7 | 8 | Final |
| (Switzerland) Binia Feltscher | 2 | 0 | 2 | 1 | 0 | 2 | 0 | X | 7 |
| (Canada) Kayla Skrlik | 0 | 1 | 0 | 0 | 1 | 0 | 1 | X | 3 |

| Sheet C | 1 | 2 | 3 | 4 | 5 | 6 | 7 | 8 | Final |
| (Germany) Daniela Jentsch | 0 | 0 | 0 | 2 | 0 | 0 | 0 | X | 2 |
| (South Korea) Kim Eun-jung | 0 | 3 | 2 | 0 | 0 | 1 | 2 | X | 8 |

| Sheet D | 1 | 2 | 3 | 4 | 5 | 6 | 7 | 8 | 9 | Final |
| (United States) Susan Dudt | 0 | 2 | 0 | 0 | 0 | 0 | 4 | 0 | 0 | 6 |
| (Estonia) Triin Madisson | 0 | 0 | 1 | 0 | 3 | 1 | 0 | 1 | 1 | 7 |

==== Draw 3 ====
Friday, December 6, 18:30

| Sheet A | 1 | 2 | 3 | 4 | 5 | 6 | 7 | 8 | Final |
| (Switzerland) Binia Feltscher | 0 | 0 | 3 | 0 | 2 | 0 | 2 | X | 7 |
| (South Korea) Kim Eun-jung | 1 | 1 | 0 | 1 | 0 | 1 | 0 | X | 4 |

| Sheet B | 1 | 2 | 3 | 4 | 5 | 6 | 7 | 8 | Final |
| (United States) Susan Dudt | 0 | 1 | 1 | 0 | 2 | 0 | 1 | X | 5 |
| (Russia) Alina Kovaleva | 2 | 0 | 0 | 2 | 0 | 2 | 0 | X | 6 |

| Sheet C | 1 | 2 | 3 | 4 | 5 | 6 | 7 | 8 | Final |
| (Canada) Kayla Skrlik | 0 | 2 | 0 | 3 | 0 | 0 | 0 | 0 | 5 |
| (Estonia) Triin Madisson | 2 | 0 | 1 | 0 | 1 | 0 | 1 | 1 | 6 |

| Sheet D | 1 | 2 | 3 | 4 | 5 | 6 | 7 | 8 | Final |
| (Germany) Daniela Jentsch | 3 | 0 | 0 | 1 | 0 | 1 | 0 | 0 | 5 |
| (China) Han Yu | 0 | 1 | 0 | 0 | 2 | 0 | 2 | 1 | 6 |

==== Draw 4 ====
Saturday, December 7, 14:00

| Sheet A | 1 | 2 | 3 | 4 | 5 | 6 | 7 | 8 | Final |
| (Estonia) Triin Madisson | 0 | 0 | 0 | 0 | 0 | 0 | X | X | 0 |
| (China) Han Yu | 2 | 1 | 0 | 2 | 3 | 1 | X | X | 9 |

| Sheet B | 1 | 2 | 3 | 4 | 5 | 6 | 7 | 8 | 9 | Final |
| (Canada) Kayla Skrlik | 2 | 2 | 0 | 1 | 1 | 0 | 0 | 0 | 0 | 6 |
| (Germany) Daniela Jentsch | 0 | 0 | 1 | 0 | 0 | 2 | 2 | 1 | 1 | 7 |

| Sheet C | 1 | 2 | 3 | 4 | 5 | 6 | 7 | 8 | 9 | Final |
| (United States) Susan Dudt | 0 | 1 | 0 | 0 | 1 | 1 | 1 | 0 | 0 | 4 |
| (Switzerland) Binia Feltscher | 2 | 0 | 1 | 0 | 0 | 0 | 0 | 1 | 1 | 5 |

| Sheet D | 1 | 2 | 3 | 4 | 5 | 6 | 7 | 8 | Final |
| (Russia) Alina Kovaleva | 0 | 4 | 0 | 1 | 0 | 0 | 3 | X | 8 |
| (South Korea) Kim Eun-jung | 0 | 0 | 1 | 0 | 1 | 1 | 0 | X | 3 |

==== Draw 5 ====
Sunday, December 8, 09:30

| Sheet A | 1 | 2 | 3 | 4 | 5 | 6 | 7 | 8 | Final |
| (Canada) Kayla Skrlik | 0 | 2 | 0 | 2 | 1 | 0 | 0 | 4 | 9 |
| (United States) Susan Dudt | 3 | 0 | 2 | 0 | 0 | 1 | 0 | 0 | 6 |

| Sheet B | 1 | 2 | 3 | 4 | 5 | 6 | 7 | 8 | Final |
| (South Korea) Kim Eun-jung | 0 | 2 | 0 | 1 | 0 | 3 | 0 | 1 | 7 |
| (China) Han Yu | 0 | 0 | 2 | 0 | 2 | 0 | 1 | 0 | 5 |

| Sheet C | 1 | 2 | 3 | 4 | 5 | 6 | 7 | 8 | Final |
| (Estonia) Triin Madisson | 0 | 0 | 1 | 0 | 0 | 2 | 0 | X | 3 |
| (Russia) Alina Kovaleva | 2 | 2 | 0 | 0 | 2 | 0 | 2 | X | 8 |

| Sheet D | 1 | 2 | 3 | 4 | 5 | 6 | 7 | 8 | Final |
| (Switzerland) Binia Feltscher | 0 | 2 | 0 | 3 | 0 | 1 | 0 | 1 | 7 |
| (Germany) Daniela Jentsch | 2 | 0 | 1 | 0 | 1 | 0 | 2 | 0 | 6 |

==== Draw 6 ====
Sunday, December 8, 18:30

| Sheet A | 1 | 2 | 3 | 4 | 5 | 6 | 7 | 8 | Final |
| (Germany) Daniela Jentsch | 3 | 3 | 0 | 1 | 0 | 2 | 1 | X | 10 |
| (Estonia) Triin Madisson | 0 | 0 | 1 | 0 | 2 | 0 | 0 | X | 3 |

| Sheet B | 1 | 2 | 3 | 4 | 5 | 6 | 7 | 8 | Final |
| (Russia) Alina Kovaleva | 0 | 3 | 1 | 1 | 0 | 1 | 0 | 0 | 6 |
| (Switzerland) Binia Feltscher | 1 | 0 | 0 | 0 | 2 | 0 | 0 | 2 | 5 |

| Sheet C | 1 | 2 | 3 | 4 | 5 | 6 | 7 | 8 | Final |
| (South Korea) Kim Eun-jung | 0 | 0 | 2 | 0 | 4 | 0 | 1 | X | 7 |
| (United States) Susan Dudt | 1 | 0 | 0 | 1 | 0 | 1 | 0 | X | 3 |

| Sheet D | 1 | 2 | 3 | 4 | 5 | 6 | 7 | 8 | Final |
| (China) Han Yu | 0 | 1 | 0 | 3 | 0 | 0 | 2 | X | 6 |
| (Canada) Kayla Skrlik | 1 | 0 | 1 | 0 | 1 | 1 | 0 | X | 4 |

==== Draw 7 ====
Monday, December 9, 14:00

| Sheet A | 1 | 2 | 3 | 4 | 5 | 6 | 7 | 8 | Final |
| (South Korea) Kim Eun-jung | 0 | 2 | 0 | 2 | 0 | 1 | 1 | 0 | 6 |
| (Canada) Kayla Skrlik | 0 | 0 | 3 | 0 | 3 | 0 | 0 | 1 | 7 |

| Sheet B | 1 | 2 | 3 | 4 | 5 | 6 | 7 | 8 | Final |
| (China) Han Yu | 1 | 0 | 2 | 2 | 0 | 4 | X | X | 9 |
| (United States) Susan Dudt | 0 | 1 | 0 | 0 | 2 | 0 | X | X | 3 |

| Sheet C | 1 | 2 | 3 | 4 | 5 | 6 | 7 | 8 | Final |
| (Russia) Alina Kovaleva | 0 | 0 | 1 | 0 | 1 | 0 | X | X | 2 |
| (Germany) Daniela Jentsch | 2 | 1 | 0 | 3 | 0 | 3 | X | X | 9 |

| Sheet D | 1 | 2 | 3 | 4 | 5 | 6 | 7 | 8 | Final |
| (Estonia) Triin Madisson | 0 | 1 | 0 | 1 | 0 | 1 | X | X | 3 |
| (Switzerland) Binia Feltscher | 3 | 0 | 2 | 0 | 5 | 0 | X | X | 10 |

=== Playoffs ===
Semifinals
1 | (China) Han Yu | 3
4 | (South Korea) Kim Eun-jung | 5
2 | (Russia) Alina Kovaleva | 7
3 | (Switzerland) Binia Feltscher | 3

Final
4 | (South Korea) Kim Eun-jung | 4
2 | (Russia) Alina Kovaleva | 6

| Bronze-medal game |
| 1 | (China) Han Yu | 5 |
| 3 | (Switzerland) Binia Feltscher | 7 |

==== Semifinals ====
Monday, December 9, 19:30

| Sheet C | 1 | 2 | 3 | 4 | 5 | 6 | 7 | 8 | Final |
| (Russia) Alina Kovaleva | 0 | 2 | 0 | 2 | 0 | 0 | 1 | 2 | 7 |
| (Switzerland) Binia Feltscher | 0 | 0 | 1 | 0 | 2 | 0 | 0 | 0 | 3 |

| Sheet D | 1 | 2 | 3 | 4 | 5 | 6 | 7 | 8 | 9 | Final |
| (China) Han Yu | 1 | 0 | 0 | 1 | 0 | 0 | 0 | 1 | 0 | 3 |
| (South Korea) Kim Eun-jung | 0 | 0 | 2 | 0 | 0 | 1 | 0 | 0 | 2 | 5 |

==== Bronze-medal game ====
Tuesday, December 10, 14:00

| Sheet D | 1 | 2 | 3 | 4 | 5 | 6 | 7 | 8 | Final |
| (China) Han Yu | 2 | 1 | 0 | 0 | 0 | 1 | 1 | 0 | 5 |
| (Switzerland) Binia Feltscher | 0 | 0 | 1 | 2 | 3 | 0 | 0 | 1 | 7 |

==== Final ====
Tuesday, December 10, 14:00

| Sheet B | 1 | 2 | 3 | 4 | 5 | 6 | 7 | 8 | Final |
| (South Korea) Kim Eun-jung | 0 | 0 | 0 | 2 | 0 | 1 | 1 | 0 | 4 |
| (Russia) Alina Kovaleva | 1 | 1 | 0 | 0 | 2 | 0 | 0 | 2 | 6 |
