= Carole Howald =

Swiss curler (born 1993)

- Curler
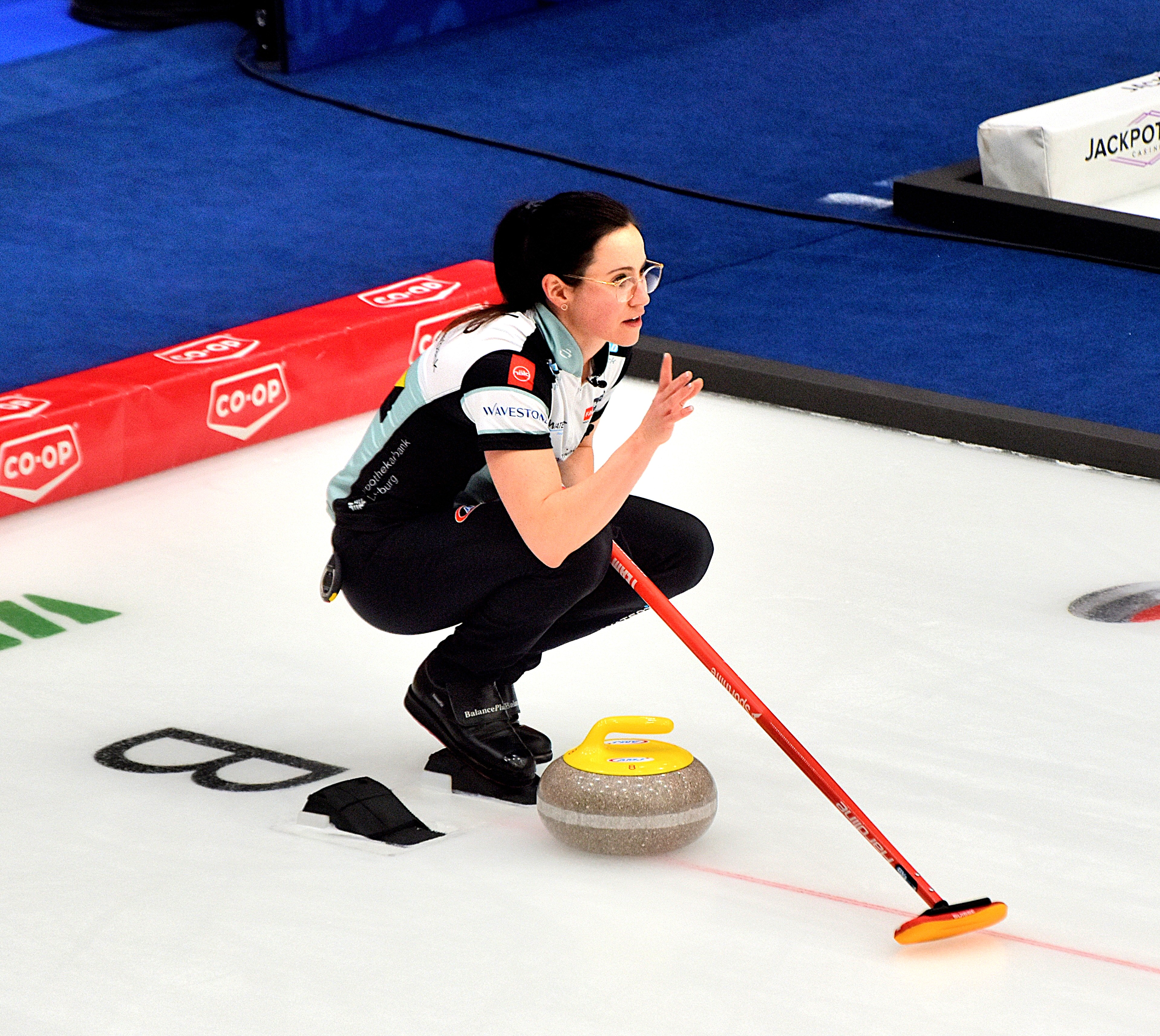
- Howald at the 2026 Players' Championship in Steinbach, Manitoba.
- Born: 29 March 1993 (age 33); Langenthal, Switzerland

Team
- Curling club: CC Flims, Flims
- Mixed doubles partner: Benoît Schwarz-van Berkel

Curling career
- Member Association: Switzerland
- World Championship: 9 (2014, 2015, 2016, 2018, 2021, 2022, 2023, 2024, 2025)
- World Mixed Doubles Championship: 1 (2015)
- European Championship: 6 (2014, 2016, 2021, 2022, 2023, 2024)
- Olympic: 2 (2022, 2026)
- Grand Slam victories: 5 (2022 National, 2024 Players', 2025 Players', 2025 Canadian Open, 2026 Players' (Jan.))
Medal record
Women's curling
Representing Switzerland
Olympic Games
Silver medal – second place	2026 Milano Cortina	Team
World Championships
Gold medal – first place	2014 Saint John
Gold medal – first place	2015 Sapporo
Gold medal – first place	2016 Swift Current
Gold medal – first place	2021 Calgary
Gold medal – first place	2022 Prince George
Gold medal – first place	2023 Sandviken
Silver medal – second place	2024 Sydney
Silver medal – second place	2025 Uijeongbu
European Championships
Gold medal – first place	2014 Champéry
Gold medal – first place	2023 Aberdeen
Gold medal – first place	2024 Lohja
Silver medal – second place	2022 Östersund

Carole Howald (born 29 March 1993 in Langenthal) is a Swiss curler from Langenthal. She won the silver medal at 2026 Winter Olympics as the second of the team skipped by Silvana Tirinzoni. She is also a six-time women's world champion, winning five titles as alternate and one as second in 2023.

== Career ==
Howald joined the Binia Feltscher rink at lead in 2017. She previously played with Melanie Barbezat and with this rink won the 2014 Dumfries Curling Challenge. They played in three Grand Slams in her first season with the team, qualifying in one of them, the 2017 Boost National. She got to play in her first official World Championship at the 2018 World Women's Curling Championship after being the alternate at her previous three appearances. The team struggled that week, failing to reach the playoffs after posting a 5–7 record. At the conclusion of the 2017–18 season, Irene Schori left the team and Howald was promoted to third. The team almost made it to the World Championships that season, but were bested by Silvana Tirinzoni 8–7 in the final.

Team Feltscher had a slow start to the 2019–20 season, failing to make the playoffs in their first four events. Howald got to throw fourth rocks for the team at the 2019 AMJ Campbell Shorty Jenkins Classic with Michèle Jäggi stepping in to skip the team. They finished with a 1-3 record. They played in just one slam event, the 2019 Tour Challenge Tier 2 and lost in the quarterfinals. The Feltscher rink finished third at both the 2019 Changan Ford International Curling Elite and the Schweizer Cup. They picked it up in the second half of the season, however, qualifying in every event. They placed third at the 2020 Swiss Women's Curling Championship. Binia Feltscher retired from competitive curling at the end of the season and the team disbanded.

Howald and second Stefanie Berset joined the Irene Schori rink for the 2020–21 season. The team competed in two tour events during the abbreviated season, finishing third at the 2020 Schweizer Cup and reaching the quarterfinals of the 2020 Women's Masters Basel. Team Schori was one of four teams to compete in the 2021 Swiss Women's Curling Championship, where they finished in last place with a 2–7 record after the triple round robin.

To begin the 2021–22 season, Team Schori was invited to compete alongside the men's teams at the 2021 Baden Masters. There, they finished with a 1–3 record, only beating Magnus Nedregotten of Norway. Elsewhere on tour, they won the Part II Bistro Ladies Classic over Cathy Auld and made it to two other event finals. They lost to Eve Muirhead in the final of The Challenger and to Nora Wüest in the St. Galler Elite Challenge final. They also had playoff appearances at the 2021 Women's Masters Basel, Stu Sells Toronto Tankard and the DeKalb Superspiel. Team Schori competed in one Grand Slam event, the 2021 National, where they finished with a winless 0–3 record. The team finished their season with a 2–3 record at the 2022 Swiss Women's Curling Championship, not advancing to the second round. Howald left the Schori rink at the end of the season. On 12 May it was announced that Howald would be joining the new Silvana Tirinzoni rink at second for the 2022–23 season. The team also included fourth Alina Pätz and lead Briar Schwaller-Hürlimann.

The new Tirinzoni rink found immediate success on tour, going undefeated in their first event to win the Summer Series. The following week, they lost to Team Clancy Grandy in the final of the 2022 Martensville International. The team next competed in the 2022 Women's Masters Basel where they lost in the semifinal to Raphaela Keiser. They bounced back immediately the following week at the 2022 Stu Sells Toronto Tankard, again going undefeated to claim their second event title of the season. Team Tirinzoni continued their strong play into the first Slam event of the season, the 2022 National. After an undefeated round robin record, the team beat Jennifer Jones 7–3 in the quarterfinals, Kaitlyn Lawes 7–5 in the semifinals, and Kerri Einarson 7–3 in the championship game to win their third tour event and Howald's first Grand Slam title. The team was back on the ice the following week at the 2022 Western Showdown where after dropping their first game, they won seven straight to claim another title. Team Tirinzoni's event streak came to an end at the 2022 Tour Challenge where after a 4–0 round robin record, they lost 9–2 in the quarterfinals to Isabella Wranå. Next for the team was the 2022 European Curling Championships where they finished third in the round robin with a 6–3 record. They then beat Italy's Stefania Constantini in the semifinal before dropping the championship game 8–4 to Denmark's Madeleine Dupont. After much success in the first half of the season, the team missed the playoffs at their next two events, the 2022 Masters and the 2023 Canadian Open. They rebounded, however, at the 2023 International Bernese Ladies Cup, going a perfect 8–0 to win the event. At the 2023 Swiss Women's Curling Championship, the team won 6–4 over Corrie Hürlimann in the championship game. This qualified Team Tirinzoni for the 2023 World Women's Curling Championship where they continued their winning streak, going 12–0 through the round robin. They then topped Sweden's Anna Hasselborg 8–4 to qualify for the final against Norway's Marianne Rørvik. Despite not having their best game, the Swiss team stole two in the tenth end to win the game 6–3 and secure the World Championship title. Team Tirinzoni ended their season at the final two Slams of the season, the 2023 Players' Championship and the 2023 Champions Cup. At the Players', the team lost two straight before going on a six-game winning streak to qualify for the final. There, they lost 6–5 to Isabella Wranå. Prior to the Champions Cup, the team's last event of the season, they announced they had removed Briar Schwaller-Hürlimann from the team for "team harmony" reasons. The team made the decision while Schwaller-Hürlimann was playing in the 2023 World Mixed Doubles Curling Championship, but did not tell her until she travelled to Canada to play in the Champions Cup. Schwaller-Hürlimann was replaced by Rachel Erickson at the tournament, where they missed the playoffs with a 1–4 record. Days later, it was announced that Selina Witschonke was replacing Schwaller-Hürlimann on the team at second with Howald shifting to lead.

To begin the 2023–24 season, Team Tirinzoni won 14 straight games in their first two events to claim the 2023 Women's Masters Basel and the 2023 AMJ Campbell Shorty Jenkins Classic, going an undefeated 7–0 at both. They then reached the quarterfinals of the 2023 Players Open where they lost to Kim Eun-jung. At the first Slam of the season, the 2023 Tour Challenge, the team had an undefeated record through the round robin before losing 7–4 in the quarterfinals to Jennifer Jones. They bounced back immediately with another undefeated run to win the Stu Sells 1824 Halifax Classic, their third title of the season. At the 2023 National, the team had another playoff appearance but lost in the semifinals to Korea's Gim Eun-ji. In November 2023, Team Tirinzoni won the gold medal at the 2023 European Curling Championships for the first time, finishing a perfect 11–0 through the event. In the final, they defeated Italy's Stefania Constantini 6–5 after a perfect hit-and-roll to the button on Pätz' final shot. They then lost in the quarterfinals of the 2023 Western Showdown to Isabella Wranå. At the next two Slams, the 2023 Masters and the 2024 Canadian Open, the team made two straight finals where they lost to Rachel Homan on both occasions. In the latter, they lost on an extra end steal after Pätz' draw went too far. They followed this with a quarterfinal finish at the 2024 International Bernese Ladies Cup, dropping a 4–3 decision to the Xenia Schwaller junior rink. Despite already being selected for the 2024 World Women's Curling Championship, Team Tirinzoni won the Swiss Women's Championship in February by defeating Team Schwaller in the final. At the World Championship, the team finished the round robin in second place overall with a 10–2 record after losses to Canada's Homan and Scotland's Rebecca Morrison. After beating Italy's Constantini in the semifinal, they faced off against Team Homan again in the final. After controlling most of the first half of the game, the Swiss rink led 5–4 in the ninth end. On her last rock, Homan made a split of a rock in the 12-foot to score three, giving the Canadians a 7–5 lead. Team Tirinzoni then conceded the game in the tenth after deciding they didn't have a shot to tie the game, ending their reign as world champions. They ended the season on a positive note, however, as at the 2024 Players' Championship they beat the Homan rink in the semifinals before defeating Team Wranå 6–5 in the final with Howald claiming her second career Slam title.

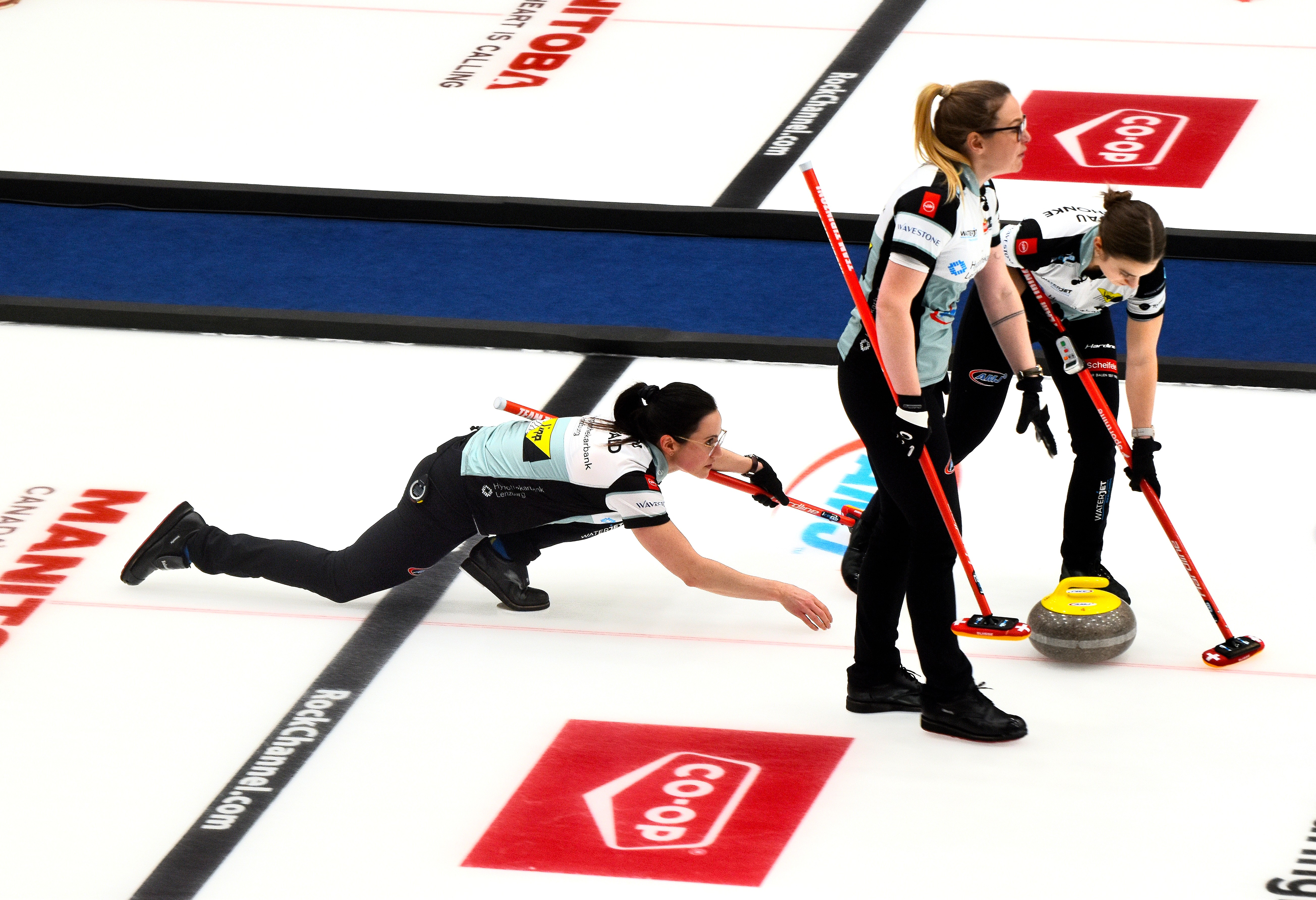
Howald makes a delivery at the 2026 Players' Championship while sliding tuck. One of the few Europeans to use a tuck delivery.

Team Tirinzoni kicked off the 2024–25 season by finishing runner-up to Team Homan at the 2024 AMJ Campbell Shorty Jenkins Classic. They then played in the 2024 Women's Masters Basel where they defended their title, defeating Anna Hasselborg in the final. After failing to qualify at the 2024 Tour Challenge, they had an undefeated run at the 2024 Stu Sells Toronto Tankard up until the final where they lost to Kim Eun-jung. At the Swiss European Qualifier, they easily beat the Xenia Schwaller rink 4–0 in the best-of-seven series, securing their spot at the 2024 European Curling Championships. Before the Euros, they reached the final of the 2024 Canadian Open Slam, dropping a 7–5 decision to the Homan rink. They bounced back with a dominant performance at the Europeans, again winning all 11 of their games to secure the title. At the next two Slams, the 2024 National and the 2025 Masters, they lost in a tiebreaker and quarterfinal to Ha Seung-youn and Rachel Homan respectively. They rebounded again at the 2025 International Bernese Ladies Cup, however, claiming their third championship of the season. The following month, they went undefeated at the Swiss Championship until the playoffs where they lost both the 1 vs. 2 game and the semifinal. This third-place finish meant they would not qualify as the Swiss representatives for the 2025 European Curling Championships the following season, despite being two-time defending champions. Still, they represented the country at the 2025 World Women's Curling Championship where they went 11–1 in the round robin, only losing to Canada. After beating China's Wang Rui in the semifinal, they lost in the final for a second straight year to Team Homan, settling for silver. Despite losing the previous five meetings, Team Tirinzoni beat Team Homan 5–4 in the final of the 2025 Players' Championship to end the season.

== Personal life ==
Howald is a student, in the bachelors sciences in sport program. She is in a relationship with Canadian curler Kirk Muyres.

== Teams ==
Season	Skip	Third	Second	Lead	Alternate
2013–14	Andrea Marx	Carole Howald	Adonia Brunner	Gisèle Beuchat	Bettina Lanz
2014–15	Melanie Barbezat	Carole Howald	Jenny Perret	Daniela Rupp	
2015–16	Melanie Barbezat	Carole Howald	Jenny Perret	Daniela Rupp	
2016–17	Melanie Barbezat	Jenny Perret	Carole Howald	Daniela Rupp	
2017–18	Binia Feltscher	Irene Schori	Franziska Kaufmann	Carole Howald	
2018–19	Binia Feltscher	Carole Howald	Stefanie Berset	Larissa Hari	
2019–20	Binia Feltscher	Carole Howald	Stefanie Berset	Larissa Hari	Michèle Jäggi
2020–21	Irene Schori	Carole Howald	Lara Stocker	Stefanie Berset	
2021–22	Irene Schori	Carole Howald	Lara Stocker	Stefanie Berset	
2022–23	Alina Pätz (Fourth)	Silvana Tirinzoni (Skip)	Carole Howald	Briar Schwaller-Hürlimann	
2023–24	Alina Pätz (Fourth)	Silvana Tirinzoni (Skip)	Selina Witschonke	Carole Howald	Stefanie Berset
2024–25	Alina Pätz (Fourth)	Silvana Tirinzoni (Skip)	Carole Howald	Selina Witschonke	Stefanie Berset
2025–26	Alina Pätz (Fourth)	Silvana Tirinzoni (Skip)	Carole Howald	Selina Witschonke	Stefanie Berset
