= Binia Feltscher =

Swiss curler and Olympic medalist

- Curler
- Born: Binia Beeli; 13 October 1978 (age 48); Chur, Switzerland

Team
- Curling club: CC Flims, Flims

Curling career
- Member Association: Switzerland
- World Championship: 5 (2005, 2010, 2014, 2016, 2018)
- European Championship: 7 (2004, 2005, 2006, 2009, 2011, 2014, 2016)
- Olympic: 1 (2006)
Medal record
Women's curling
Representing Switzerland
Olympic Games
Silver medal – second place	2006 Turin
World Championships
Gold medal – first place	2014 Saint John
Gold medal – first place	2016 Swift Current
European Championships
Gold medal – first place	2014 Champéry
Silver medal – second place	2004 Sofia
Silver medal – second place	2005 Garmisch-Partenkirchen
Silver medal – second place	2009 Aberdeen
Bronze medal – third place	2006 Basel

Binia Feltscher (born 13 October 1978 in Chur) is a Swiss retired curler from Flims. She was the skip of the 2014 and 2016 World championship curling teams from Switzerland. She also won a silver medal in 2006 Winter Olympics as the third of the team skipped by Mirjam Ott. From 2006 to 2013 she was known as Binia Feltscher-Beeli.

== Career ==
Feltscher began curling in 1989 and started skipping in 2007. Feltscher was the third of the Swiss team skipped by Mirjam Ott at the 2006 Winter Olympics, where she won a silver medal. With Ott, Feltscher won silver medals at the European Curling Championships in 2004 and 2005 and a bronze in 2006. Team Ott represented Switzerland at the 2005 World Women's Curling Championship and finished eighth with a 4–7 record. Feltscher left the Ott rink in 2007 to form her own team. She won another silver medal at the European Championships in 2009. Her second trip to the World Championships was in 2010 where she skipped the Swiss rink to a 3–8 record.

Binia won her first World Curling Tour event in 2013 at the Glynhill Ladies International. She also won the Karuizawa International that season as well.

The 2013–14 season was a breakthrough year for Feltscher and teammates Irene Schori, Franziska Kaufmann and Christine Urech. At the start of the season, they won the 2013 Red Deer Curling Classic and made the playoffs of the Stockholm Ladies Cup and the Women's Masters Basel. They also won the right to represent Switzerland at the 2014 World Women's Curling Championship in Saint John, New Brunswick. They had a great round robin, finishing in second with a 9–2 record, only losing to South Korea and Russia. This sent her to the 1 vs 2 game against Canada's Rachel Homan which she would lose 8–3. They quickly rebounded in the semifinal against Korea's Kim Ji-sun setting up a rematch against Homan. After a slow first half, the Swiss team would score three points in the eighth end and steal three in the ninth, giving them a 9–5 lead going into the final end. They successfully ran the Canadians out of stones to secure Switzerland's fourth World Championship title.

The following season, Team Feltscher won the 2014 European Curling Championships by defeating Anna Sidorova in the final. They also played in three Grand Slam of Curling events, the first time playing in one for Feltscher. They qualified at both the 2014 Masters and the 2014 Canadian Open. They did not get to defend their title as World Champions, finishing 4–6 at the 2015 Swiss Women's Curling Championship. The 2015–16 season started slow for the Swiss rink, only qualifying in three events at the start including winning the 2015 International ZO Women's Tournament. Things changed however when they won the Swiss championship and were back at the World Championships. They finished the round robin of the 2016 World Women's Curling Championship once again with a 9–2 but this time in first place, giving them hammer and choice of stones in the 1 vs 2 game. They defeated Japan's Satsuki Fujisawa to advance to the final where they would once again play the Japanese rink. Up 7–6 in the last end, they forced Fujisawa to draw for one to tie the game but she was to heavy, giving Feltscher and her team their second World Women's Curling Championship gold medal and title. The team ended their season by winning the 2016 Euronics European Masters.

Team Feltscher won the right to represent Switzerland at the 2016 European Curling Championships but they did not qualify. They made the semifinal of the 2016 WFG Masters and finished second at the Swiss championship. The next season, they were able to win the Swiss playdowns, sending Feltscher to yet another World Women's Curling Championship. She couldn't win three in a row as the team struggled throughout the week, posting a 5–7 record. At the conclusion of the 2017–18 season, Irene Schori and Franziska Kaufmann left the team and were replaced by Stefanie Berset and Larissa Hari. The team almost made it to the World Championships that season, but were bested by Silvana Tirinzoni 8–7 in the final.

Team Feltscher had a slow start to the 2019–20 season, failing to make the playoffs in their first four events. They played in just one slam event, the 2019 Tour Challenge Tier 2 and lost in the quarterfinals. The Feltscher rink finished third at both the 2019 Changan Ford International Curling Elite and the Schweizer Cup. They picked it up in the second half of the season however, qualifying in every event. They placed third at the 2020 Swiss Women's Curling Championship. After the season ended, Feltscher announced her retirement from competitive curling.

== Personal life ==
Feltscher is married and has two children.

== Teams ==
Season	Skip	Third	Second	Lead	Events
2004–05	Mirjam Ott	Binia Beeli	Brigitte Schori	Michèle Knobel	WCT, ECC, WCC
2005–06	Mirjam Ott	Binia Beeli	Valeria Spälty	Michèle Moser	WCT, ECC, OG
2006–07	Mirjam Ott	Binia Feltscher-Beeli	Valeria Spälty	Janine Greiner	WCT, ECC
2007–08	Binia Feltscher-Beeli	Sandra Attinger	Yvonne Schlunegger	Corinne Bourquin	WCT
2008–09	Binia Feltscher-Beeli	Sandra Ramstein-Attinger	Sibille Buhlmann	Corinne Bourquin	WCT
2009–10	Binia Feltscher-Beeli	Sandra Ramstein-Attinger	Sibille Buhlmann	Corinne Bourquin	WCT, ECC
2009–10	Binia Feltscher-Beeli	Corinne Borquin	Heike Schwaller	Sandra Ramstein-Attinger	WCC
2010–11	Binia Feltscher-Beeli	Marlene Albrecht	Christine Urech	Sandra Ramstein-Attinger	WCT
2011–12	Binia Feltscher-Beeli	Marlene Albrecht	Franziska Kaufmann	Christine Urech	WCT, ECC
2012–13	Binia Feltscher-Beeli	Irene Schori	Franziska Kaufmann	Christine Urech	WCT
2013–14	Binia Feltscher	Irene Schori	Franziska Kaufmann	Christine Urech	WCT, WCC
2014–15	Binia Feltscher	Irene Schori	Franziska Kaufmann	Christine Urech	WCT, ECC
2015–16	Binia Feltscher	Irene Schori	Franziska Kaufmann	Christine Urech	WCT, ECC, WCC
2016–17	Binia Feltscher	Irene Schori	Franziska Kaufmann	Christine Urech	WCT, ECC
2017–18	Binia Feltscher	Irene Schori	Franziska Kaufmann	Carole Howald	WCT, WCC
2018–19	Binia Feltscher	Carole Howald	Stefanie Berset	Larissa Hari	WCT
2019–20	Binia Feltscher	Carole Howald	Stefanie Berset	Larissa Hari	WCT

== Grand Slam record ==
Key
C	Champion
F	Lost in Final
SF	Lost in Semifinal
QF	Lost in Quarterfinals
R16	Lost in the round of 16
Q	Did not advance to playoffs
T2	Played in Tier 2 event
DNP	Did not participate in event
N/A	Not a Grand Slam event that season

Event	2014–15	2015–16	2016–17	2017–18	2018–19	2019–20
Masters	QF	Q	QF	DNP	DNP	DNP
Tour Challenge	N/A	Q	DNP	T2	T2	T2
The National	N/A	DNP	SF	QF	DNP	DNP
Canadian Open	QF	Q	DNP	DNP	DNP	DNP
Players'	Q	DNP	DNP	DNP	DNP	N/A
Champions Cup	N/A	DNP	DNP	Q	DNP	N/A
