= Irene Schori =

Swiss curler (born 1983)

- Curler
- Born: 4 December 1983 (age 42); Zürich, Switzerland

Team
- Curling club: CC Flims, Flims

Curling career
- Member Association: Switzerland
- World Championship: 3 (2014, 2016, 2018)
- World Mixed Doubles Championship: 3 (2008, 2009, 2010)
- European Championship: 2 (2010, 2014, 2016)
- Olympic: 1 (2010)
Medal record
Representing Switzerland
Women's curling
World Championships
Gold medal – first place	2014 Saint John
Gold medal – first place	2016 Swift Current
European Championships
Gold medal – first place	2014 Champéry
Bronze medal – third place	2010 Champéry
Mixed Doubles Curling
World Mixed Doubles Curling Championship
Gold medal – first place	2008 Vierumäki
Gold medal – first place	2009 Cortina d'Ampezzo

Irene Schori (born 4 December 1983) is a retired Swiss curler from Bremgarten. During her career, she won two World Women's Curling Championships in 2014 and 2016 as third for the Binia Feltscher rink. She also won gold at the 2014 European Curling Championships and bronze at the 2010 European Curling Championships. In mixed doubles, she won back-to-back World Mixed Doubles Curling Championships in 2008 and 2009 with partner Toni Müller. She was the alternate on the Swiss women's team that placed fourth at the 2010 Winter Olympics.

== Career ==
Schori was named to the Swiss Olympic Team in 2010. She served as the alternate for Mirjam Ott's team in Vancouver. They just missed winning a medal, finishing fourth.

Schori has participated in both the 2008 and the 2009 World Mixed Doubles Curling Championships with partner Toni Müller, and has taken gold at both of these championships. Schori and Müller were the heavy favorites to win in the 2010 World Mixed Doubles Curling Championship, but were eliminated by the China in an extra end in the quarterfinals. In an interview post-match, Schori stated that she and Müller would consider not attending next year to give a chance to other Swiss teams.

Schori played with Silvana Tirinzoni from 2009–2012 before joining the Binia Feltscher rink. She won her first World Curling Tour event with the Tirinzoni rink in 2011 at the Red Deer Curling Classic. She won the 2013 Glynhill Ladies International and the 2014 Karuizawa International with the Feltscher rink.

The 2013–14 season was a breakthrough year for Schori and teammates Binia Feltscher, Franziska Kaufmann and Christine Urech. At the start of the season, they won the 2013 Red Deer Curling Classic and made the playoffs of the Stockholm Ladies Cup and the Women's Masters Basel. They also won the right to represent Switzerland at the 2014 World Women's Curling Championship in Saint John, New Brunswick, Schori's first World Championship. They had a great round robin, finishing in second with a 9–2 record, only losing to South Korea and Russia. This sent her to the 1 vs 2 game against Canada's Rachel Homan which she would lose 8–3. They quickly rebounded in the semifinal against Korea's Kim Ji-sun setting up a rematch against Homan. After a slow first half, the Swiss team would score three points in the eighth end and steal three in the ninth, giving them a 9–5 lead going into the final end. They successfully ran the Canadians out of stones to secure Switzerland's fourth World Championship title.

The following season, Team Feltscher won the 2014 European Curling Championships by defeating Anna Sidorova in the final. They also played in three Grand Slam of Curling events, qualifying at both the 2014 Masters and the 2014 Canadian Open. They did not get to defend their title as World Champions, finishing 4–6 at the 2015 Swiss Women's Curling Championship. The 2015–16 season started slow for the Swiss rink, only qualifying in three events at the start including winning the 2015 International ZO Women's Tournament. Things changed however when they won the Swiss championship and were back at the World Championships. They finished the round robin of the 2016 World Women's Curling Championship once again with a 9–2 but this time in first place, giving them hammer and choice of stones in the 1 vs 2 game. They defeated Japan's Satsuki Fujisawa to advance to the final where they would once again play the Japanese rink. Up 7–6 in the last end, they forced Fujisawa to draw for one to tie the game but she was to heavy, giving Schori and her team their second World Women's Curling Championship gold medal and title. The team ended their season by winning the 2016 Euronics European Masters.

Team Feltscher won the right to represent Switzerland at the 2016 European Curling Championships but they did not qualify. They made the semifinal of the 2016 WFG Masters and finished second at the Swiss championship. The next season, they were able to win the Swiss playdowns, sending Schori to yet another World Women's Curling Championship. They couldn't win three in a row as the team struggled throughout the week, posting a 5–7 record. At the conclusion of the 2017–18 season, Schori left the team and formed her own team with third Lara Stocker, second Roxane Héritier and lead Isabelle Maillard.

The team's first season together wasn't very successful, only making the playoffs in three events. The team won the Gord Carroll Curling Classic the next season and finished runner-up at the Paf Masters Tour. They missed the playoffs at the 2020 Swiss Women's Curling Championship, finishing 2–4. After the season, Héritier and Maillard left the team and Schori and Stocker brought on Carole Howald and Stefanie Berset at third and lead respectively for the 2020–21 season. The team competed in two tour events during the abbreviated season, finishing third at the 2020 Schweizer Cup and reaching the quarterfinals of the 2020 Women's Masters Basel. Team Schori was one of four teams to compete in the 2021 Swiss Women's Curling Championship, where they finished in last place with a 2–7 record after the triple round robin.

To begin the 2021–22 season, Team Schori was invited to compete alongside the men's teams at the 2021 Baden Masters. There, they finished with a 1–3 record, only beating Magnus Nedregotten of Norway. Elsewhere on tour, they won the Part II Bistro Ladies Classic over Cathy Auld and made it to two other event finals. They lost to Eve Muirhead in the final of The Challenger and to Nora Wüest in the St. Galler Elite Challenge final. They also had playoff appearances at the 2021 Women's Masters Basel, Stu Sells Toronto Tankard and the DeKalb Superspiel. Team Schori competed in one Grand Slam event, the 2021 National, where they finished with a winless 0–3 record. The team finished their season with a 2–3 record at the 2022 Swiss Women's Curling Championship, not advancing to the second round. Third Carole Howald left the team following the season. Schori, Stefanie Berset and Lara Stocker then added Michèle Jäggi and Sarah Müller to their team for the 2022–23 season. Jäggi took over the team at skip with Schori playing third, Berset at second, Müller at lead and Stocker as the alternate.

Team Jäggi found immediate success to begin the 2022–23 season, reaching the semifinals of the 2022 Euro Super Series. Two events later, they advanced to the finals of the 2022 Women's Masters Basel where they were defeated by Raphaela Keiser. In Canada, they qualified for another final at the 2022 Alberta Curling Series: Event 3, losing to Rebecca Morrison. The team next played in the 2022 Curlers Corner Autumn Gold Curling Classic where they qualified for the playoffs through the C event. They then upset both the Kaitlyn Lawes and Jennifer Jones rinks in the playoffs to reach another final where they lost to Gim Eun-ji 8–2. With the points accumulated from their successful results, Team Jäggi qualified for two Grand Slam events, the 2022 Masters and the 2023 Canadian Open. At the Masters, they finished 2–2 through the round robin before losing a tiebreaker to Anna Hasselborg. At the Canadian Open, they missed the playoffs with a 1–3 record. Despite their successes on tour, they could not continue their run at the Swiss Women's Championship as they finished 3–5 through the round robin and failed to advance to the second round.

In January 2023, Schori announced that she would be retiring at the end of the season.

== Personal life ==
Schori is employed as forensics civil agent.

== Grand Slam record ==
Key
C	Champion
F	Lost in Final
SF	Lost in Semifinal
QF	Lost in Quarterfinals
R16	Lost in the round of 16
Q	Did not advance to playoffs
T2	Played in Tier 2 event
DNP	Did not participate in event
N/A	Not a Grand Slam event that season

Event	2011–12	2012–13	2013–14	2014–15	2015–16	2016–17	2017–18	2018–19	2019–20	2020–21	2021–22	2022–23
The National	N/A	N/A	N/A	N/A	DNP	SF	QF	DNP	DNP	N/A	Q	DNP
Tour Challenge	N/A	N/A	N/A	N/A	Q	DNP	T2	DNP	DNP	N/A	N/A	DNP
Masters	N/A	DNP	DNP	QF	Q	QF	DNP	DNP	DNP	N/A	DNP	Q
Canadian Open	N/A	N/A	N/A	QF	Q	DNP	DNP	DNP	DNP	N/A	N/A	Q
Players'	Q	DNP	DNP	Q	DNP	DNP	DNP	DNP	N/A	DNP	DNP	DNP

=== Former events ===
Event	2013–14
Manitoba Liquor & Lotteries	Q

== Teams ==
Season	Skip	Third	Second	Lead	Alternate
2009–10	Silvana Tirinzoni	Irene Schori	Christine Urech	Sandra Gantenbein	
2010–11	Silvana Tirinzoni	Irene Schori	Esther Neuenschwander	Sandra Gantenbein	
2011–12	Silvana Tirinzoni	Irene Schori	Esther Neuenschwander	Sandra Gantenbein	Anna Neuenschwander
2012–13	Binia Feltscher-Beeli	Irene Schori	Franziska Kaufmann	Christine Urech	
2013–14	Binia Feltscher	Irene Schori	Franziska Kaufmann	Christine Urech	Carole Howald
2014–15	Binia Feltscher	Irene Schori	Franziska Kaufmann	Christine Urech	Carole Howald
2015–16	Binia Feltscher	Irene Schori	Franziska Kaufmann	Christine Urech	Carole Howald
2016–17	Binia Feltscher	Irene Schori	Franziska Kaufmann	Christine Urech	Carole Howald
2017–18	Binia Feltscher	Irene Schori	Franziska Kaufmann	Carole Howald	Raphaela Keiser
2018–19	Irene Schori	Lara Stocker	Roxane Héritier	Isabelle Maillard	
2019–20	Irene Schori	Lara Stocker	Roxane Héritier	Isabelle Maillard	
2020–21	Irene Schori	Carole Howald	Lara Stocker	Stefanie Berset	
2021–22	Irene Schori	Carole Howald	Lara Stocker	Stefanie Berset	
2022–23	Michèle Jäggi	Irene Schori	Stefanie Berset	Sarah Müller	Lara Stocker
