= Part II Bistro Ladies Classic =

Woman's curling tour

The Part II Bistro Ladies Classic (formerly the Listowel Women's Classic and the Listowel Women's Cash Spiel) is a bonspiel that is part of the women's Ontario Curling Tour. The event is an annual event held in November and takes place at the Wingham Golf and Curling Club in Wingham, Ontario. Prior to 2018 it was held at the Listowel Curling Club in Listowel, Ontario. The first event was held in 2015, and was sponsored by Libro Credit Union. In its latest season in 2019, it was part of the World Curling Tour.

== Past champions ==
Year	Winning skip	Runner-up skip	Purse (CAD)	Winner's share
2015	(Ontario) Julie Tippin	(Ontario) Megan Balsdon	$6,800	$2,500
2016	(Ontario) Danielle Inglis	(Ontario) Julie Hastings	$8,200	$2,000
2017	(Ontario) Cathy Auld	(Ontario) Katelyn Wasylkiw	$5,000	$2,000
2018	(Ontario) Jestyn Murphy	(Ontario) Cathy Auld	$10,400	$3,000
2019	(Ontario) Katelyn Wasylkiw	(Ontario) Jestyn Murphy	$10,400	$3,000
2021	(Switzerland) Irene Schori	(Ontario) Cathy Auld	$10,000	
