= Euan Kyle =

Scottish curler

- Curler
- Born: 25 October 1997 (age 29); Stranraer, Scotland

Team
- Curling club: Leswalt CC, Stranraer, SCO
- Skip: Grant Hardie
- Fourth: Ross Whyte
- Second: Craig Waddell
- Lead: Euan Kyle
- Mixed doubles partner: Vicky Drummond

Curling career
- Member Association: Scotland
- World Championship: 2 (2022, 2026)
- World Mixed Doubles Championship: 1 (2027)
- European Championship: 1 (2026)
- Grand Slam victories: 2 (2025 Masters, 2026 Players')
Medal record
Men's curling
Representing Scotland
World Championships
Bronze medal – third place	2026 Ogden
European Championships
Gold medal – first place	2026 Ostrava
World Junior Championships
Silver medal – second place	2018 Aberdeen
Bronze medal – third place	2019 Liverpool
Scottish Men's Championship
Gold medal – first place	2024 Dumfries
Gold medal – first place	2025 Dumfries
Gold medal – first place	2026 Dumfries
Silver medal – second place	2022 Dumfries
Bronze medal – third place	2023 Dumfries
Scottish Mixed Doubles Championship
Gold medal – first place	2026 Aberdeen
Bronze medal – third place	2017 Aberdeen

Euan Kyle (born 25 October 1997 in Stranraer) is a Scottish curler from Leswalt. He currently plays lead on Team Grant Hardie. Playing for Ross Whyte, Kyle won gold at the 2024 Scottish Men's Curling Championship, silver at the 2018 World Junior Curling Championships and won bronze at the 2019 World Junior Curling Championships. He was also the alternate on Team Ross Paterson at the 2022 World Men's Curling Championship.

== Career ==
=== Juniors ===
At the 2017 Scottish Junior Curling Championships, Kyle played second on the Cameron Bryce rink which also included third Robin Brydone and lead Frazer Shaw. Through the round robin, the team finished with an undefeated 7–0 record to qualify for the playoffs. They then won both the 1 vs. 2 game and the final against Team Ross Whyte to secure the Scottish junior title and a trip to the 2017 World Junior Curling Championships. There, the team finished third through the preliminary stage with a 6–3 record, qualifying for the final four. After stealing the win against Norway in the 3 vs. 4 game, they lost both the semifinal and bronze medal game to South Korea and the Norwegian team respectively, placing fourth.

During the 2017–18 season, Kyle competed on the men's tour as lead for Cameron Bryce while also playing lead on Ross Whyte's junior rink. With Bryce, the team won their first World Curling Tour event at the Tallinn Challenger, going undefeated to claim the title. With Whyte, the team posted an undefeated record to claim the Scottish junior championship, qualifying for the 2018 World Junior Curling Championships. There, he and his team of Whyte, Robin Brydone, Fraser Kingan and Duncan McFadzean topped the round robin with an unblemished 9–0 record. They then defeated Switzerland in the semifinal to qualify for the world junior final. Tied in an extra end, the Scottish rink lost 6–5 to Canada's Tyler Tardi.

In his final year of juniors, Kyle won a third Scottish junior title, once again going undefeated through the Scottish championship. At the 2019 World Junior Curling Championships, Team Whyte again went through the round robin unbeaten. They suffered their first loss in the semifinals following a narrow 10–9 game against Switzerland but rebounded to defeat Norway in the bronze medal game.

=== Men's ===
Out of juniors, Kyle continued to play lead for Ross Whyte with Duncan McFadzean and Robin Brydone rounding out the lineup at second and third respectively. In their first season, the team claimed two tour titles at the Prague Classic and the Dumfries Challenger Series. They also reached the final of the Grant Prix Bern Inter Curling Challenge and were semifinalists at five other tour stops. Their success on tour was not replicated at the Scottish championship, however, as they finished 4–3 and failed to advance to the playoffs. Despite this, the team ranked seventeenth in the world at the end of the season after starting in fifty-fifth. For much of the 2020–21 season, there was no tour due to the COVID-19 pandemic. In the four domestic challenges Team Whyte played in, they lost in the final of all four to Team Bruce Mouat.

Team Whyte had a strong start to the 2021–22 season, reaching the final of the 2021 Euro Super Series where they lost to Yannick Schwaller. After a quarterfinal finish in their second event, they won the KW Fall Classic with an unbeaten record, defeating fellow Scotts Team Ross Paterson in the final. They also made the final of their next event, the ATB Okotoks Classic, where they lost to Kevin Koe. With the points they accumulated from the first part of the season, Team Whyte qualified for the 2021 Masters, their first Grand Slam of Curling event. Through the triple knockout, the team qualified through the C side to enter the playoffs before losing to the Mouat rink in the quarterfinals. They also played in the next Grand Slam, the 2021 National, again qualifying for the playoffs through the C event. They then lost to Brad Gushue in the quarters. In the new year, Team Whyte entered the 2022 Scottish Men's Curling Championship as the highest ranked team as Team Mouat was competing in the Olympics. Through the round robin, the team posted an 8–2 record, securing first place. They then defeated Team Paterson in the 1 vs. 2 game before losing to them in a rematch in the final. After the event, Kyle was invited to join Team Paterson as their alternate at the 2022 World Men's Curling Championship, Kyle's first appearance at the event. At the Worlds, the team qualified for the playoffs with a 7–5 record. They then lost in the qualification game to the United States' Korey Dropkin, settling for fifth place. Team Whyte ended their season with a semifinal finish at the Aberdeen International Curling Championship and a 2–3 record at the 2022 Players' Championship Slam.

After having their most successful season to date, Team Whyte had mixed results throughout the 2022–23 season. At the first two Slams, the 2022 National and the 2022 Tour Challenge, the team was unsuccessful in qualifying, finishing 1–3 at both events. They turned things around in November, however, winning the Swiss Cup Basel and the Original 16 Tour Bonspiel in back-to-back weeks. In the finals, they defeated Magnus Ramsfjell and Aaron Sluchinski respectively. At the 2022 Masters, the team finished 3–1, earning a playoff spot. They were then defeated by Team Mouat in the quarterfinals. The following month, they missed the playoffs again at the 2023 Canadian Open. Back in Scotland, the team had a strong start to the Scottish championship, sitting 6–0 with one round robin game left to play. They then lost both their final round robin game and 1 vs. 2 game to Team Mouat and the semifinal to James Craik, finishing third. They rebounded at their next tour stop by going undefeated to claim the Aberdeen International Curling Championship. This included a semifinal victory over Team Mouat and a championship win over Italy's Joël Retornaz. They ended their season at the 2023 Players' Championship and 2023 Champions Cup Slam events, losing out in the tiebreaker and quarterfinals respectively.

The Whyte rink came out of the gate strong to begin the 2023–24 season, reaching the semifinals of the 2023 Baden Masters before losing consecutive finals at the 2023 Euro Super Series and the 2023 Stu Sells Oakville Tankard to Team Mouat. In their fourth event, they succeeded in capturing the 2023 AMJ Campbell Shorty Jenkins Classic, defeating Niklas Edin in the championship game. In Grand Slam play, the team had their best season to date, beginning at the 2023 Tour Challenge where they reached the semifinals. They also qualified at the 2023 National before a quarterfinal loss to Brendan Bottcher. At the 2023 Masters, the team finished with a 2–2 record which was just enough to qualify for a tiebreaker. They then defeated Team Edin to qualify before upsetting Brad Gushue and Yannick Schwaller in the quarterfinals and semifinals to reach their first Slam final. There, they fell 3–2 to Joël Retornaz. In their next two events, the team lost in the final and semifinals of the 2024 Mercure Perth Masters and 2024 Canadian Open respectively, both to the Mouat rink. Next for Team Whyte was the 2024 Scottish championship where they dominated the competition, going undefeated through the entire event. In the final, they beat James Craik 7–6 to claim their first Scottish men's title. Despite this, Team Mouat was still chosen to represent Scotland at the 2024 World Men's Curling Championship. To wrap up their season, the team had a quarterfinal finish at the 2024 Players' Championship, though Kyle did not compete with the team as he was recoving from an injury.

The Whyte team continued this momentum from the previous season during the 2024-25 curling season, winning their first Grand Slam of Curling event at the 2025 Masters, beating Brad Jacobs in the final. They then defended their Scottish men's title in 2025, beating the current top ranked team in the world, Team Mouat, 8–3 in the final. Despite their strong results on the Grand Slam circuit and defending their men's national championship title, Team Mouat was later chosen by British Curling again to represent Scotland at the 2025 World Men's Curling Championship, who were number one in the world rankings. Team Whyte would finish the 2024–25 season at the 2025 Players' Championship, finishing 2–3.

=== Mixed doubles ===
Kyle played in his first Scottish Mixed Doubles Curling Championship in 2017 with partner Naomi Brown. There, the pair finished 3–2 through the round robin, qualifying for a tiebreaker. They then won two straight sudden death games to reach the semifinals where they were eliminated by Rachel Hannen and Bobby Lammie, earning the bronze medal. Kyle did not return to the championship until 2022 where he teamed up with Gina Aitken. After a 4–1 round robin record, the team lost in the quarterfinals to Hailey Duff and Hammy McMillan Jr.. He also had quarterfinal finishes in both 2023 and 2024 with partners Beth Farmer and Fay Henderson respectively.

In 2026, Kyle returned to mixed doubles alongside Vicky Drummond, a former Olympic Gold medalist who was also returning to curling following a brief retirement. In their first year together, Drummond and Kyle won the 2026 Scottish Mixed Doubles Championship, going undefeated in the event and qualifying for the 2027 World Mixed Doubles Curling Championship.

== Personal life ==
Kyle attended Stranraer Academy. He currently works at the Woodhead of Mailer Farm.

== Teams ==
=== Men's ===
Season	Skip	Third	Second	Lead	Alternate
2013–14	Ross Whyte	Bobby Lammie	Neil Topping	Euan Kyle	
2014–15	Ross Whyte	James Baird	Gavin Barr	Euan Kyle	
2015–16	Ross Whyte	James Baird	Gavin Barr	Euan Kyle	David Baird
2016–17	Cameron Bryce	Robin Brydone	Euan Kyle	Frazer Shaw	Ross Whyte (WJCC)
2017–18	Cameron Bryce	Ross Whyte	Robin Brydone	Euan Kyle	Angus Dowell
2017–18	Ross Whyte	Robin Brydone	Fraser Kingan	Euan Kyle	Duncan McFadzean (WJCC)
2018–19	Ross Whyte	Duncan McFadzean	James Craik	Euan Kyle	Ryan McCormack (WJCC)
2019–20	Ross Whyte	Robin Brydone	Duncan McFadzean	Euan Kyle	
2020–21	Ross Whyte	Robin Brydone	Duncan McFadzean	Euan Kyle	
2021–22	Ross Whyte	Robin Brydone	Duncan McFadzean	Euan Kyle	Greg Drummond (SMCC)
2022–23	Ross Whyte (Fourth)	Robin Brydone (Skip)	Duncan McFadzean	Euan Kyle	
2023–24	Ross Whyte	Robin Brydone	Duncan McFadzean	Euan Kyle	
2024–25	Ross Whyte	Robin Brydone	Duncan McFadzean	Euan Kyle	
2025–26	Ross Whyte	Robin Brydone	Craig Waddell	Euan Kyle	Duncan McFadzean
2026–27	Ross Whyte (Fourth)	Grant Hardie (Skip)	Craig Waddell	Euan Kyle	

=== Mixed doubles ===
Season	Female	Male
2017–18	Naomi Brown	Euan Kyle
2022–23	Gina Aitken	Euan Kyle
2023–24	Beth Farmer	Euan Kyle
2024–25	Fay Henderson	Euan Kyle
2026–27	Vicky Drummond	Euan Kyle
