= 2020–21 curling season =

- Sport: Curling

Seasons
- ← 2019–20 2021–22 →

The 2020–21 curling season began in August 2020 and ended in May 2021.

Note: In events with two genders, the men's tournament winners will be listed before the women's tournament winners.

== World Curling Federation events ==
=== Championships ===
Event	Gold	Silver	Bronze
World Mixed Curling Championship; Aberdeen, Scotland, Oct. 10–17	Cancelled		
Pacific-Asia Curling Championships; Wakkanai, Japan, Nov. 7–14	Cancelled		
European Curling Championships; Lillehammer, Norway, Nov. 21–28	Cancelled		
Winter Universiade; Lucerne, Switzerland, TBA	Postponed indefinitely		
World Junior Curling Championships; Beijing, China, Feb. 18–28	Cancelled		
World Wheelchair Curling Championship; Beijing, China, Mar. 6–13	Postponed		
World Men's Curling Championship; Calgary, Alberta, Canada, Apr. 2–11	Sweden (Edin)	Scotland (Mouat)	Switzerland (de Cruz)
World Wheelchair-B Curling Championship; Lohja, Finland, Apr. 10 – 15	United States (Thums)	Switzerland (Decorvét)	Italy (Menardi)
World Senior Curling Championships; TBA, Apr. 24–May 1	Cancelled		
World Women's Curling Championship; Calgary, Alberta, Canada, Apr. 30–May 9	Switzerland (Tirinzoni)	RCF (Kovaleva)	United States (Peterson)
World Mixed Doubles Curling Championship; Aberdeen, Scotland, United Kingdom, May 17–23	Scotland (Dodds / Mouat)	Norway (Skaslien / Nedregotten)	Sweden (de Val / Eriksson)

=== Qualification events ===
Event	Qualifiers
Americas Challenge; Chaska, Minnesota, United States of America, Nov. 12–15	Cancelled
World Mixed Doubles Qualification Event; Erzurum, Turkey, Dec. 5–12	Cancelled
World Qualification Event; Lohja, Finland, Jan. 12–17	Cancelled

== Curling Canada events ==
=== Championships ===
Event	Gold	Silver	Bronze
Canadian Mixed Curling Championship; Canmore, Alberta, Nov. 8–15	Cancelled		
Canadian Curling Club Championships; Ottawa, Ontario, Nov. 22–28	Cancelled		
Canadian U18 Curling Championships; Timmins, Ontario, Feb. 7–13	Cancelled		
Scotties Tournament of Hearts; Calgary, Alberta, Feb. 19–28	Canada (Einarson)	Ontario (Homan)	Alberta (Walker)
Tim Hortons Brier; Calgary, Alberta, Mar. 5–14	Alberta (Bottcher)	(Alberta) Wild Card #2 (Koe)	Saskatchewan (Dunstone)
Canadian Junior Curling Championships; Fort McMurray, Alberta, Mar. 15–23	Cancelled		
Canadian Mixed Doubles Curling Championship; Calgary, Alberta, Mar. 19–28	(Manitoba) Einarson / (Newfoundland and Labrador) Gushue	(Manitoba) Sahaidak / Lott	(Alberta) Schmiemann / Morris
Canadian Wheelchair Curling Championship; Moose Jaw, Saskatchewan, Mar. 22–27	Cancelled		
U Sports/Curling Canada University Curling Championships; TBA, TBA	Cancelled		
CCAA/Curling Canada College Curling Championships; TBA, TBA	Cancelled		

=== Provincial and territorial playdowns ===
Province / Territory	Men			Women		
Province / Territory	Event	Champion	Runner-up	Event	Champion	Runner-up
Newfoundland and Labrador; St. John's, Jan. 29 – 30 (Women's); Jan. 27 – 31 (Men's)	Newfoundland and Labrador Tankard	Greg Smith	Colin Thomas	Newfoundland and Labrador Scotties	Sarah Hill	Mackenzie Mitchell
Northwest Territories; Yellowknife, Jan. 9 – 12 (Women's); Jan. 30 – 31	Northwest Territories; Men's Championship	Greg Skauge	Glen Hudy	Northwest; Territories Scotties	Kerry Galusha	Cassie Rogers
Nunavut; Iqaluit, Jan. 8 – 10 (Men's)	2021 Nunavut; Brier Playdowns	Peter Mackey	Wade Kingdon	–	Lori Eddy	–
Prince Edward Island; O'Leary, Jan. 29 – 30	Prince Edward; Island Tankard	Eddie MacKenzie	Blair Jay	Prince Edward; Island Scotties	Suzanne Birt	Darlene London
Yukon; Whitehorse, Jan. 15 – 17 (Women's)	–	Dustin Mikkelsen	–	2021 Yukon; Scotties	Laura Eby	Patty Wallingham

== Other events ==
Event	Winner	Runner-up
Schweizer Cup; Baden, Switzerland, Aug. 20–23 (team); Interlaken, Switzerland, Sep. 25–27 (doubles)	(Canton of Schaffhausen) Andrin Schnider	(Canton of Bern) Yannick Schwaller
Schweizer Cup; Baden, Switzerland, Aug. 20–23 (team); Interlaken, Switzerland, Sep. 25–27 (doubles)	(Valais) Elena Stern	(Aargau) Silvana Tirinzoni
Schweizer Cup; Baden, Switzerland, Aug. 20–23 (team); Interlaken, Switzerland, Sep. 25–27 (doubles)	(Aargau) Pätz / Michel	(Canton of Glarus) Perret / Rios
Norway Cup (round 1); Oslo, Norway, Sept. 18–20	(Sweden) Alexander Lindström	Mathias Brænden
Norway Cup (round 1); Oslo, Norway, Sept. 18–20	(Elite Group); Steffen Walstad	(Elite Group); Thomas Ulsrud
Russian Curling Cup; Dmitrov, Russia Oct. 8–12 (men's); Oct. 1–6 (women's)	(Moscow Oblast) Alexander Eremin	(Saint Petersburg) Alexey Timofeev
Russian Curling Cup; Dmitrov, Russia Oct. 8–12 (men's); Oct. 1–6 (women's)	(Saint Petersburg) Alina Kovaleva	(Krasnodar Krai) Anna Sidorova
Norway Cup (round 2); Oppdal, Norway, Nov. 6–8	Elias Høstmælingen	Marianne Rørvik
Norway Cup (round 2); Oppdal, Norway, Nov. 6–8	(Elite Group); Magnus Ramsfjell	(Elite Group); Thomas Ulsrud
Canada Cup; Fredericton, New Brunswick, Nov. 24–29	Cancelled	
Sweden National Challenge; Sundbyberg, Sweden, Dec. 11–13	Isabella Wranå	Anna Hasselborg
British Curling NCA December events Stirling, Scotland Dec. 14–16 (mixed doubles tankard); Dec. 17–20 (Superspiel; open)	(Scotland) Dodds / Mouat	(Scotland) Wright / Hardie
British Curling NCA December events Stirling, Scotland Dec. 14–16 (mixed doubles tankard); Dec. 17–20 (Superspiel; open)	(Scotland) Bruce Mouat	(Scotland) Ross Whyte
EliteCup Snarøya; Snarøya, Norway, Dec. 18–20	Steffen Walstad	Thomas Ulsrud
Continental Cup; Oakville, Ontario, Jan. 7–10	Cancelled	
British Curling NCA January Challenge; Stirling, Scotland Jan. 15–17	(Scotland) Bruce Mouat	(Scotland) Ross Whyte
British Curling NCA January Challenge; Stirling, Scotland Jan. 15–17	(Scotland) Eve Muirhead	(Scotland) Gina Aitken
British Curling NCA Elite Finals; Stirling, Scotland Feb. 1–6 (team); Feb. 10–14 (mixed doubles)	(Scotland) Bruce Mouat	(Scotland) Ross Whyte
British Curling NCA Elite Finals; Stirling, Scotland Feb. 1–6 (team); Feb. 10–14 (mixed doubles)	(Scotland) Gina Aitken	(Scotland) Eve Muirhead
British Curling NCA Elite Finals; Stirling, Scotland Feb. 1–6 (team); Feb. 10–14 (mixed doubles)	(Scotland) Dodds / Mouat	(Scotland) Muirhead / Lammie
Swiss Worlds Trials; Biel/Bienne Feb. 19–21 (team); Mar. 4–7 (mixed doubles)	(Canton of Geneva) Peter de Cruz	(Canton of Bern) Yannick Schwaller
Swiss Worlds Trials; Biel/Bienne Feb. 19–21 (team); Mar. 4–7 (mixed doubles)	(Aargau) Silvana Tirinzoni	(Valais) Elena Stern
Swiss Worlds Trials; Biel/Bienne Feb. 19–21 (team); Mar. 4–7 (mixed doubles)	(Canton of Glarus) Perret / Rios	(Canton of Solothurn) Hürlimann / Schwaller
Korean National Mixed; Doubles Final Selection; Gangneung, South Korea, Apr. 17–18	Kim J. / Moon	Jang / Seong

== National championships ==
=== Czech Republic ===
Event	Gold	Silver	Bronze
Czech Men's Curling Championship; Prague, Sept. 24–29	Lukáš Klíma	David Šik	Karel Kubeška
Czech Women's Curling Championship; Prague, Sept. 24–29	Anna Kubešková	Hana Synáčková	Eva Miklíková

=== Estonia ===
Event	Gold	Silver	Bronze
Estonian Men's Curling Championship; Tallinn, Jan. 28–31	Eduard Veltsman	Tarmo Vähesoo	Harri Lill
Estonian Women's Curling Championship; Tallinn, Jan. 28–31	Marie Turmann	Triin Madisson	Tene Link
Estonian Mixed Doubles Curling Championship; Tallinn, Feb. 18–21	M. Turmann / Lill	Madisson / Kukner	L. Turmann / Sein

=== Finland ===
Event	Gold	Silver	Bronze
Finnish Mixed Doubles Curling Championship; Joensuu, Jan. 28–31	O. Kauste / A. Kauste	Virtaala / Hakanpää	M. Turto / J. Turto

=== Hungary ===
Event	Gold	Silver	Bronze
Hungarian Mixed Doubles Curling Championship; Budapest, Feb. 4–10	Palancsa / Kiss	Szekeres / Nagy	Joó / Tatár

=== Latvia ===
Event	Gold	Silver	Bronze
Latvian Mixed Doubles Curling Championship; Riga, Apr. 21–25	Rudzīte / Zentelis	D. Regža / A. Regža	Barone / Gulbis
Latvian Women's Curling Championship; Riga, Apr. 28–May 2	Evelīna Barone	Ieva Rudzīte	Elīza Stabulniece
Latvian Men's Curling Championship; Riga, May 10–May 15	Mārtiņš Trukšāns	Ansis Regža	Aivis Krimskis

=== Japan ===
Event	Gold	Silver	Bronze
Japan Men's Curling Championship; Wakkanai, Feb. 8–14	(Hokkaido) Yuta Matsumura	(Hokkaido) Takumi Maeda	(Nagano Prefecture) Yusuke Morozumi
Japan Women's Curling Championship; Wakkanai, Feb. 8–14	(Hokkaido) Sayaka Yoshimura	(Hokkaido) Satsuki Fujisawa	(Nagano Prefecture) Seina Nakajima
Japan Mixed Doubles Curling Championship; Aomori, Feb. 23–28	Yoshida / Matsumura	Matsumura / Tanida	Koana / Aoki

=== New Zealand ===
Event	Gold	Silver	Bronze
New Zealand Men's Curling Championship; Naseby, July 30–Aug. 2	Peter de Boer	Garion Long	Scott Becker
New Zealand Women's Curling Championship; Naseby, July 30–Aug. 2	Bridget Becker	Jessica Smith	Courtney Smith
New Zealand Mixed Doubles Curling Championship; Naseby, Sept. 17–20	B. Becker / Se. Becker	Duncan / Sargon	C. Smith / Watt

=== Norway ===
Event	Gold	Silver	Bronze
Norwegian Mixed Doubles Curling Championship; Lillehammer, Sept. 25–27	Mai. Ramsfjell / Mag. Ramsfjell	Rørvik / Nergård	Rønning / Brænden

=== Russia ===
Event	Gold	Silver	Bronze
Russian Men's Curling Championship (2020); Sochi, Dec. 3–9	Alexey Timofeev	Sergey Glukhov	Artem Shmakov
Russian Women's Curling Championship (2020); Sochi, Dec. 11–17	Alina Kovaleva	Anna Sidorova	Olga Kotelnikova
Russian Men's Curling Championship (2021); Sochi, Apr. 14–22	Alexey Timofeev	Mikhail Vaskov	Alexey Stukalsky
Russian Women's Curling Championship (2021); Sochi, Apr. 6–14	Olga Zharkova	Anna Sidorova	Maria Komarova
Russian Mixed Doubles Curling Championship; Sochi, Jan. 21–25	Ezekh / Krasikov	Moskaleva / Eremin	Trukhina / Lysakov
Russian Wheelchair Curling Championship; Novosibirsk, Apr. 20–27	Konstantin Kurokhtin	Aleksey Fatuev	Alexey Lyubimtsev

=== South Korea ===
Event	Gold	Silver	Bronze
Korean Men's Curling Championship; Gangneung, Nov. 19–24	Jeong Yeong-seok	Kim Chang-min	Kim Soo-hyuk
Korean Women's Curling Championship; Gangneung, Nov. 19–24	Kim Eun-jung	Gim Un-chi	Kim Min-ji
Korean Mixed Doubles Curling Championship; Gangneung, Nov. 23–27	Jang / Seong	Song / Jeon	J. Kim / Moon

=== Spain ===
Event	Gold	Silver	Bronze
Spanish Men's Curling Championship; Jaca, Mar. 12–14	(Basque Country (autonomous community)) Sergio Vez	(Basque Country (autonomous community)) Gontzal García	(Catalonia) Xavi Campos
Spanish Women's Curling Championship; Jaca, Mar. 5–7	(Basque Country (autonomous community)) Irantzu García	(Basque Country (autonomous community)) Oihane Otaegi	(Aragon) Paula Oliván
Spanish Mixed Doubles Curling Championship; Jaca, Jan. 22–Feb. 14	(Basque Country (autonomous community)) Otaegi / Unanue	(Basque Country (autonomous community)) I. García / G. García	(Aragon) Pérez / Munuera

=== Sweden ===
Event	Gold	Silver	Bronze
Swedish Mixed Doubles Curling Championship; Jönköping, Feb. 4–7	de Val / Eriksson	Westman / Ahlberg	I. Wranå / R. Wranå

=== Switzerland ===
Event	Gold	Silver	Bronze
Swiss Men's Curling Championship; Arlesheim, Feb. 6–13	(Canton of Geneva) Peter de Cruz	(Canton of Bern) Yannick Schwaller	(Canton of Glarus) Marco Hösli
Swiss Women's Curling Championship; Arlesheim, Feb. 6–13	(Aargau) Silvana Tirinzoni	(Valais) Elena Stern	(Grisons) Raphaela Keiser
Swiss Mixed Doubles Curling Championship; Biel, Jan. 27–30	(Canton of Solothurn) Hürlimann / Schwaller	(Aargau) Pätz / Michel	(Canton of Geneva) Tirinzoni / Schwarz

=== United States ===
Event	Gold	Silver	Bronze
United States Men's Curling Championship; Wausau, Wisconsin, May 25–30	(Minnesota) Korey Dropkin	(Minnesota) Jed Brundidge	(Minnesota) Luc Violette
United States Women's Curling Championship; Wausau, Wisconsin, May 26–30	(Minnesota) Cory Christensen	(North Carolina) Jamie Sinclair	(Minnesota) Madison Bear
United States Mixed Doubles Curling Championship; Wausau, Wisconsin, May 19–23	(Alaska) Persinger / (Minnesota) Plys	(Minnesota) Bear / Stopera	(Minnesota) Geving / Violette (Massachusetts) Burchesky / Richardson

== World Curling Tour ==
=== Teams ===
See: List of teams on the 2020–21 World Curling Tour

Grand Slam events in bold. Note: More events may be posted as time progresses.

=== Men's events ===
Week	Event	Winning skip	Runner-up skip	Purse (CAD)	Winner's share (CAD)	EC
12	Baden Masters; Baden, Switzerland, Aug. 28–30	(Sweden) Niklas Edin	(Netherlands) Jaap van Dorp	CHF 33,000	CHF 8,000	400
13	Cameron's Brewing Oakville Fall Classic; Oakville, Ontario, Sep. 4–7	Cancelled				
14	Adelboden International; Adelboden, Switzerland, Sep. 10–13	(Switzerland) Peter de Cruz	(Switzerland) Yannick Schwaller	CHF 4,200	CHF 1,200	100
14	AMJ Campbell Shorty Jenkins Classic; Cornwall, Ontario, Sep. 8–13	Cancelled				
15	Cabot Spiel; St. John's, Newfoundland and Labrador, Sep. 19–20	Cancelled				
15	Mother Club Fall Curling Classic; Winnipeg, Manitoba, Sep. 17–20	Cancelled				
16	The Curling Store Cashspiel; Lower Sackville, Nova Scotia, Sep. 25–27	(Nova Scotia) Travis Colter	(Nova Scotia) Chad Stevens	$5,250	$2,000	100
16	WCT Uiseong International Curling Cup; Uiseong, South Korea, Sep. 21–28	Cancelled				
16	California Curling Classic; Stockton, California, Sep. 25–28	Cancelled				
16	The Good Times Bonspiel; Calgary, Alberta, Sep. 25–27	Cancelled				
17	Stu Sells Oakville Tankard; Waterloo, Ontario, Oct. 2–4	Play halted before playoffs		$10,000	$3,000	300
17	Prestige Hotels & Resorts Curling Classic; Vernon, British Columbia, Oct. 1–4	Cancelled				
17	Swiss Cup Basel; Basel, Switzerland, Oct. 1–4	Cancelled				
17	Let's Cure Lupus St. Paul Cash Spiel; St. Paul, Minnesota, Oct. 2–4	Cancelled				
18	Stu Sells Toronto Tankard; Waterloo, Ontario, Oct. 9–12	(Ontario) John Epping	(Ontario) Glenn Howard	$4,300	$2,000	400
18	McKee Homes Fall Curling Classic; Airdrie, Alberta, Oct. 9–11	(Alberta) Ryan Jacques	(Alberta) Karsten Sturmay	$12,800	$3,400	200
18	Match Town Trophy; Jönköping, Sweden, Oct. 9–11	(Sweden) Simon Granbom	(Sweden) Alexander Lindström	SEK 20,000		100
18	Canad Inns Men's Classic; Portage la Prairie, Manitoba, Oct. 9–12	Cancelled				
18	La Classique Ville de Lévis; Lévis, Quebec, Oct. 9–12	Cancelled				
18	Kalamazoo Men's Classic; Kalamazoo, Michigan, Oct. 9–11	Cancelled				
18	Łódź International Mens Challenger; Łódź, Poland, Oct. 9–11	Cancelled				
18	Cora Breakfast & Lunch Grand Prairie Cash Spiel; Grand Prairie, Alberta, Oct. 9–11	Cancelled				
19	Curling Masters Champéry; Champéry, Switzerland, Oct. 15–18	(Switzerland) Yannick Schwaller	(Switzerland) Björn Jungen	CHF 28,000	CHF 8,000	400
19	Stroud Sleeman Cash Spiel; Stroud, Ontario, Oct. 15–18	Cancelled				
20	KW Fall Classic; Waterloo, Ontario, Oct. 23–25	(Ontario) Paul Moffatt	(Ontario) Glenn Howard			300
20	**Masters**; Sarnia, Ontario, Oct. 20–25	Cancelled				
20	WCT Latvian International Challenger; Tukums, Latvia, Oct. 22–25	Cancelled				
20	Blazing Leaves; Bridgeport, Connecticut, Oct. 22–25	Cancelled				
20	Atlantic Superstore Monctonian Challenge; Moncton, New Brunswick, Oct. 23–25	Cancelled				
20	Kamloops Crown of Curling; Kamloops, British Columbia, Oct. 23–25	Cancelled				
20	Encana Peace River Cash Spiel; Peace River, Alberta, Oct. 23–25	Cancelled				
21	Dave Jones Stanhope Simpson Insurance Mayflower Cashspiel; Halifax, Nova Scotia, Oct. 30–Nov. 1	(Newfoundland and Labrador) Brad Gushue	(Nova Scotia) Stuart Thompson	$20,000	$4,000	300
21	Grand Prix Bern Inter Curling Challenge; Bern, Switzerland, Oct. 30–Nov. 1	Cancelled				
22	Raymond James Kelowna Double Cash; Kelowna, British Columbia, Nov. 6–8	(British Columbia) Tyler Tardi	(British Columbia) Sean Geall	$15,200	$4,500	300
22	**Kioti Tractor Tour Challenge Tier 1** Grand Prairie, Alberta, Nov. 3–8	Cancelled				
22	**Kioti Tractor Tour Challenge Tier 2** Grand Prairie, Alberta, Nov. 3–8	Cancelled				
22	Prague Classic; Prague, Czech Republic, Nov. 5–8	Cancelled				
23	Ashley HomeStore Curling Classic; Penticton, British Columbia, Nov. 13–16	(Manitoba) Mike McEwen	(Ontario) Glenn Howard	$84,000		750
23	Stu Sells 1824 Halifax Classic; Halifax, Nova Scotia, Nov. 12–15	(Newfoundland and Labrador) Brad Gushue	(Nova Scotia) Matthew Manuel	$20,000	$6,000	300
23	Tallinn Mens International Challenger; Tallinn, Estonia, Nov. 13–15	Cancelled				
24	Challenge Casino de Charlevoix; Clermont, Quebec, Nov. 19–22	Cancelled				
24	The Sunova Spiel at East St. Paul; East St. Paul, Manitoba, Nov. 20–23	Cancelled				
24	Lake View Credit Union Dawson Creek Cash Spiel; Dawson Creek, British Columbia, Nov. 20–22	Cancelled				
25	Vesta Energy Red Deer Curling Classic; Red Deer, Alberta, Nov. 27–30	Cancelled				
25	College Clean Restoration Curling Classic; Saskatoon, Saskatchewan, Nov. 27–30	Cancelled				
25	Brantford Nissan Classic; Paris, Ontario, Nov. 27–29	Cancelled				
25	Curl Mesabi Classic; Eveleth, Minnesota, Nov. 27–29	Cancelled				
25	Okotoks/Black Diamond; Okotoks & Black Diamond, Alberta, Nov. 27–28	Cancelled				
25	Thistle Integrity Stakes; Winnipeg, Manitoba, Nov. 27–30	Cancelled				
25	Steele Cup Cash; Fredericton, New Brunswick, Nov. 27–29	Cancelled				
26	Original 16 WCT Bonspiel; Calgary, Alberta, Dec. 4–6	Cancelled				
26	Jim Sullivan Curling Classic; Saint John, New Brunswick, Dec. 4–6	Cancelled				
26	King Cash Spiel; Maple Ridge, British Columbia, Dec. 4–6	Cancelled				
26	Farmers Edge SCT; Wadena, Saskatchewan, Dec. 4–6	Cancelled				
26	Lake View Credit Union Fort St. John Cash Spiel; Fort St. John, British Columbia, Dec. 4–6	Cancelled				
27	**Boost National**; Chestermere, Alberta, Dec. 8–13	Cancelled				
27	Dumfries Challenger Series; Dumfries, Scotland, Dec. 10–13	Cancelled				
27	Medicine Hat Charity Classic; Medicine Hat, Alberta, Dec. 11–14	Cancelled				
28	Karuizawa International; Karuizawa, Japan, Dec. 17–20	Cancelled				
30	Centennial Spiel; St. John's, Newfoundland and Labrador, Dec. 31–Jan. 3	Cancelled				
30	KKP Classic; Winnipeg, Manitoba, Jan. 1–3	Cancelled				
31	Mercure Perth Masters; Perth, Scotland, Jan. 7–10	Cancelled				
31	Ed Werenich Golden Wrench Classic; Tempe, Arizona, Jan. 7–10	Cancelled				
31	Keijinkai Rizing Cup; Miyota, Japan, Jan. 8–11	Cancelled				
32	**Meridian Canadian Open**; Las Vegas, Nevada, Jan. 12–17	Cancelled				
34	Belgium Men's Challenger; Zemst, Belgium, Jan. 28–31	Cancelled				
35	Moscow Classic; Moscow, Russia, Feb. 2–5	Cancelled				
35	Red Square Classic; Moscow, Russia, Feb. 4–8	Cancelled				
41	Avonair Tour Spring Fling; Edmonton, Alberta, Mar. 19–21	Cancelled				
43	Alberta Tour Windup; Beaumont, Alberta, Apr. 1–4	Cancelled				
45	**Humpty's Champions Cup**; Calgary, Alberta, Apr. 15–19	(Scotland) Bruce Mouat	(Alberta) Brendan Bottcher	$150,000	$30,000	1000
46	**Princess Auto Players' Championship**; Calgary, Alberta, Apr. 20–25	(Scotland) Bruce Mouat	(Newfoundland and Labrador) Brad Gushue	$175,000	$40,000	1000
47	Murom Classic; Murom, Russia, Apr. 26–30	(Switzerland) Marco Hösli	(Russia) Timofey Nasonov	€7,000		100

=== Women's events ===
Week	Event	Winning skip	Runner-up skip	Purse (CAD)	Winner's share (CAD)	EC
12	Cameron's Brewing Oakville Fall Classic; Oakville, Ontario, Aug. 28–31	Cancelled				
14	AMJ Campbell Shorty Jenkins Classic; Cornwall, Ontario, Sep. 8–13	Cancelled				
14	Booster Juice Shoot-Out; Edmonton, Alberta, Sep. 10–13	Cancelled				
14	Paf Masters Tour; Åland, Finland, Sep. 10–13	Cancelled				
15	Women's Masters Basel; Arlesheim, Switzerland, Sep. 18–20	(Sweden) Anna Hasselborg	(Switzerland) Raphaela Keiser	32,000 CHF	8,000 CHF	400
15	Mother Club Fall Curling Classic; Winnipeg, Manitoba, Sep. 17–20	Cancelled				
15	California Curling Classic; Stockton, California, Sep. 18–21	Cancelled				
16	The Curling Store Cashspiel; Lower Sackville, Nova Scotia, Sep. 25–27	(Nova Scotia) Christina Black	(Prince Edward Island) Suzanne Birt	$5,530	$2,100	100
16	Colonial Square Ladies Classic; Saskatoon, Saskatchewan, Sep. 25–28	Cancelled				
16	The Good Times Bonspiel; Calgary, Alberta, Sep. 25–27	Cancelled				
17	Stu Sells Oakville Tankard; Waterloo, Ontario, Oct. 2–4	(Manitoba) Jennifer Jones	(Ontario) Hollie Duncan	$10,000	$3,000	300
17	Prestige Hotels & Resorts Curling Classic; Vernon, British Columbia, Oct. 1–4	Cancelled				
18	Stu Sells Toronto Tankard; Kitchener-Waterloo, Ontario, Oct. 9–12	(Ontario) Lauren Mann	(Manitoba) Jennifer Jones	$5,250	$2,000	300
18	Curlers Corner Autumn Gold Curling Classic; Calgary, Alberta, Oct. 9–12	Cancelled				
19	Canad Inns Women's Classic; Portage la Prairie, Manitoba, Oct. 15–18	Cancelled				
19	Stroud Sleeman Cash Spiel; Stroud, Ontario, Oct. 15–18	Cancelled				
20	KW Fall Classic; Waterloo, Ontario, Oct. 23–25	(Ontario) Susan Froud	(Ontario) Maddy Warriner			300
20	**Masters**; Sarnia, Ontario, Oct. 20–25	Cancelled				
20	Kamloops Crown of Curling; Kamloops, British Columbia, Oct. 23–25	Cancelled				
20	Latvia International Challenger; Tukums, Latvia, Oct. 22–25	Cancelled				
20	Blazing Leaves; Bridgeport, Connecticut, Oct. 22–25	Cancelled				
21	Dave Jones Stanhope Simpson Insurance Mayflower Cashspiel; Halifax, Nova Scotia, Oct. 30 – Nov. 1	(Nova Scotia) Jill Brothers	(Prince Edward Island) Suzanne Birt	$7,500	$3,000	100
21	Royal LePage Women's Fall Classic; Kemptville, Ontario, Oct. 29 – Nov. 1	Cancelled				
21	Tallinn Ladies International Challenger; Tallinn, Estonia, Oct. 29 – Nov. 1	Cancelled				
22	Sunset Ranch Kelowna Double Cash; Kelowna, British Columbia, Nov. 7–9	(British Columbia) Corryn Brown	(British Columbia) Mary-Anne Arsenault	$12,600	$4,000	300
22	**Kioti Tractor Tour Challenge Tier 1** Grand Prairie, Alberta, Nov. 3–8	Cancelled				
22	**Kioti Tractor Tour Challenge Tier 2** Grand Prairie, Alberta, Nov. 3–8	Cancelled				
22	Łódź International Womens Challenger; Łódź, Poland, Nov. 6–8	Cancelled				
23	Dakota Challenger Spiel; Lakeville, Minnesota, Nov. 13–15	Cancelled				
24	Gord Carroll Curling Classic - Presented by D & R Custom Steel; Whitby, Ontario, Nov. 20–22	Cancelled				
24	The Sunova Spiel at East St. Paul; East St. Paul, Manitoba, Nov. 20–23	Cancelled				
25	Vesta Energy Red Deer Curling Classic; Red Deer, Alberta, Nov. 27–30	Cancelled				
25	Steele Cup Cash; Fredericton, New Brunswick, Nov. 27–29	Cancelled				
25	Curl Mesabi Classic; Eveleth, Manitoba, Nov. 27–29	Cancelled				
25	Driving Force Decks Int'l Abbotsford Cashspiel; Abbotsford, British Columbia, Nov. 27–29	Cancelled				
25	Boundary Ford Curling Classic; Lloydminster, Saskatchewan, Nov. 27–30	Cancelled				
26	King Cash Spiel; Maple Ridge, British Columbia, Dec. 4–6	Cancelled				
26	Jim Sullivan Curling Classic; Saint John, New Brunswick, Dec. 4–6	Cancelled				
27	Medicine Hat Charity Classic; Medicine Hat, Alberta, Dec. 11–14	Cancelled				
27	**Boost National**; Chestermere, Alberta, Dec. 8–13	Cancelled				
28	Karuizawa International; Karuizawa, Japan, Dec. 17–20	Cancelled				
31	Mercure Perth Masters; Perth, Scotland, Jan. 7–10	Cancelled				
32	**Meridian Open**; Las Vegas, Nevada, Jan. 12–17	Cancelled				
33	International Bernese Ladies Cup; Bern, Switzerland, Jan. 21–24	Cancelled				
35	Belgium Womens Challenger; Zemst, Belgium, Feb. 4–7	Cancelled				
41	Avonair Tour Spring Fling; Edmonton, Alberta, Mar. 19–21	Cancelled				
45	**Humpty's Champions Cup**; Calgary, Alberta, Apr. 15–19	(Ontario) Rachel Homan	(Switzerland) Silvana Tirinzoni	$150,000	$30,000	1000
46	**Princess Auto Players' Championship**; Calgary, Alberta, Apr. 20–25	(Manitoba) Kerri Einarson	(Ontario) Rachel Homan	$175,000	$40,000	1000

=== Mixed doubles events ===
Week	Event	Winning pair	Runner-up pair	Purse (CAD)	Winner's share (CAD)	EC
11	New Zealand Winter Games Mixed Doubles; Naseby, New Zealand, Aug. 23–28	Cancelled				
12	WCT Khabarovsk Cup; Khabarovsk, Russia, Aug. 28 – Sep. 1	Cancelled				
12	Battleford Mixed Doubles Curling Classic; North Battleford, Saskatchewan, Aug. 28 – Sep. 1	Cancelled				
13	Oberstdorf International Mixed Doubles Cup; Oberstdorf, Germany, Sep. 4–6	(Sweden) de Val / Eriksson	(Czech Republic) Paulová / Paul	€ 3,530	$800	300
13	WCT Pacific Ocean Cup; Vladivostok, Russia, Sep. 1–5	Cancelled				
15	WCT Tallinn Mixed Doubles International; Tallinn, Estonia, Sep. 17–20	(Sweden) Sjödin / Edin	(Scotland) Stirling / Kingan	€ 3,325	€ 1,125	300
15	Goldline Tour Final; Quebec City, Quebec, Sep. 18–20	(Quebec) É. Desjardins / R. Desjardins	(Quebec) Bouchard / Charest	$6,700		300
15	California Curling Classic; Stockton, California, Sep. 22–24	Cancelled				
16	WCT St. Petersburg Open; St. Petersburg, Russia, Sep. 21–27	Cancelled				
16	Brampton Mixed Doubles Curling Cup; Brampton, Ontario, Sep. 26–27	Cancelled				
17	International Mixed Doubles St. Gallen; St. Gallen, Switzerland, Oct. 1–4	(Switzerland) Perret / Rios	(Italy) Cobelli / Mosaner	CHF 4,000		300
17	Sherwood Park Mixed Doubles Classic; Sherwood Park, Alberta, Oct. 2–4	Cancelled				
18	Mixed Doubles Bern; Bern, Switzerland, Oct. 9–11	(Sweden) I. Wranå / R. Wranå	(Switzerland) Perret / Rios	CHF 12,000		500
19	Colorado Curling Cup; Golden, Colorado, Oct. 15–18	Cancelled				
19	WCT Austrian Mixed Doubles Cup; Kitzbühel, Austria Oct. 15–18	Cancelled				
20	WCT Mixed Doubles Cup Geising; Geising, Germany, Oct. 22–25	Cancelled				
20	Goldline Tour Valleyfield; Salaberry-de-Valleyfield, Quebec Oct. 23–25	Cancelled				
21	MadTown DoubleDown; McFarland, Wisconsin, Oct. 30–Nov. 1	Cancelled				
21	Palmerston Mixed Doubles Spiel; Palmerston, Ontario, Oct. 31–Nov. 1	Cancelled				
22	Goldline Tour Clermont; Clermont, Quebec, Nov. 6–8	Cancelled				
23	Heracles Mixed Doubles Slovakia Cup; Bratislava, Slovakia, Nov. 12–15	(Czech Republic) Paulová / Paul	(Czech Republic) Zelingrova / Chabičovský	€ 1,200	€ 1,000	100
23	Canad Inns Mixed Doubles Championship; Portage la Prairie, Manitoba, Nov. 13–15	Cancelled				
23	Ilderton Mixed Doubles Spiel; Ilderton, Ontario, Nov. 14–15	Cancelled				
24	Brantford Mixed Doubles Cashspiel; Brantford, Ontario, Nov. 20–23	Cancelled				
24	Goldline Tour Sherbrooke; Sherbrooke, Quebec, Nov. 20–22	Cancelled				
25	WCT Latvian Mixed Doubles Curling Cup 1 Riga, Latvia, Nov. 26–29	(Latvia) Barone / Veidamanis	(Latvia) Rudzīte / Zentelis	€1,000		100
26	ISS WCT Mixed Doubles Łódź; Łódź, Poland, Dec. 3–6	(Poland) Lipińska / Stych	(Czech Republic) Paulová / Paul	€2,500	€900	100
26	Bele Wrana Memorial; Sundbyberg, Sweden, Dec. 4–6	Cancelled				
26	Goldline Tour Quebec; Quebec City, Quebec, Dec. 4–6	Cancelled				
27	Italian Mixed Doubles Cup; Pinerolo, Italy, Dec. 10–13	Cancelled				
27	Bayview Mixed Doubles; Thornhill, Ontario, Dec. 12–13	Cancelled				
28	STP Mixed Doubles; St. Paul, Alberta, Dec. 18–20	Cancelled				
30	Qualico Mixed Doubles Classic; Banff & Canmore, Alberta, Dec. 31–Jan. 3	Cancelled				
30	WCT-Japan Nayoro Mixed Doubles Spiel; Nayoro, Japan, Jan. 1–3	Cancelled				
32	Stu Sells Toronto Cricket Mixed Doubles Cashspiel; Toronto, Ontario, Jan. 15–18	Cancelled				
32	WCT Dutch Masters Mixed Doubles; Zoetermeer, Netherlands, Jan. 15–17	Cancelled				
33	Gefle Mixed Doubles Cup; Gävle, Sweden, Jan. 21–24	Cancelled				
34	Goldline Tour Amos; Amos, Quebec, Jan. 29–31	Cancelled				
35	WCT Moscow Classic; Moscow, Russia, Feb. 4–8	(Russia) Samoylik / Vaskov	(Italy) Lo Deserto / (Russia) Glukhov	€ 10,000		500
35	Sutherland Mixed Doubles Curling Classic; Saskatoon, Saskatchewan, Feb. 5–7	Cancelled				
35	International Mixed Doubles Trophy Aarau; Aarau Switzerland, Feb. 5–7	Cancelled				
35	Goldline Tour Chicoutimi; Chicoutimi, Quebec, Feb. 5–7	Cancelled				
35	Hvidovre Mixed Doubles Cup; Hvidovre, Denmark, Feb. 5–7	Cancelled				
36	WCT Tallinn Masters Mixed Doubles; Tallinn, Estonia, Feb. 11–14	Cancelled				
36	Highland Mixed Doubles Classic; Regina, Saskatchewan, Feb. 12–14	Cancelled				
37	Ontario Mixed Doubles Tour Championship; Wingham, Ontario, Feb. 19–21	Cancelled				
39	Sirius Cup; Sochi, Russia, Mar. 3–8	(Russia) Moskaleva / Eremin	(Russia) Samoylik / Vaskov	US$5,000		300
39	Slovakia Mixed Doubles Curling Cup; Bratislava, Slovakia, Mar. 4–7	Cancelled				
40	Westbay – Hungarian Mixed Doubles Curling Cup; Budapest, Hungary, Mar. 11–14	(Hungary) Palancsa / Kiss	(Hungary) Szekeres / Nagy	€5,000		300
41	International Mixed Doubles Dumfries; Dumfries, Scotland, Mar. 18–21	Cancelled				
42	Peugeot Mixed Doubles Masters; Biel/Bienne, Switzerland, Mar. 25–28	Cancelled				
43	Gothenburg Mixed Doubles Cup; Gothenburg, Sweden, Apr. 2–4	Cancelled				
43	TCA Mixed Doubles; Thornhill, Ontario, Apr. 3–4	Cancelled				
44	WCT Latvian Mixed Doubles Curling Cup 2 Riga, Latvia, Apr. 8–11	(Czech Republic) Paulová / Paul	(Estonia) Turmann / Lill	€1,000		100
44	Goldline Tour Final; Sillery, Quebec, Apr. 9–11	Cancelled				
47	WCT Tallinn Masters Mixed Doubles; Tallinn, Estonia, Apr. 30–May 2	(Russia) Ezekh / Stukalski	(Hungary) Palancsa / Kiss	€3,325		300
51	WCT Arctic Cup; Dudinka, Russia, May 27–30	(Switzerland) Hürlimann / Schwaller	(Russia) Samoylik / Vaskov	€ 20,000		1000

== WCF rankings ==
Due to the COVID-19 pandemic, the points system was initially suspended until November 30, 2020 due to many of the events at the start of the season being cancelled. Later on, it was announced no teams would be receiving points for the season due to the pandemic.

Men

Rankings
#	Skip	YTD	OOM
1	(Ontario) Brad Jacobs	0.000	483.766
2	(Ontario) John Epping	0.000	445.311
3	(Newfoundland and Labrador) Brad Gushue	0.000	395.747
4	(Alberta) Brendan Bottcher	0.000	347.977
5	(Scotland) Bruce Mouat	0.000	343.005
6	(Switzerland) Yannick Schwaller	0.000	330.558
7	(Manitoba) Mike McEwen	0.000	317.716
8	(Sweden) Niklas Edin	0.000	304.835
9	(Switzerland) Peter de Cruz	0.000	289.135
10	(Alberta) Kevin Koe	0.000	277.610

Women

Rankings
#	Skip	YTD	OOM
1	(Sweden) Anna Hasselborg	0.000	467.462
2	(Manitoba) Kerri Einarson	0.000	420.069
3	(Manitoba) Tracy Fleury	0.000	404.325
4	(Japan) Satsuki Fujisawa	0.000	342.871
5	(Manitoba) Jennifer Jones	0.000	341.765
6	(Switzerland) Elena Stern	0.000	333.591
7	(Switzerland) Silvana Tirinzoni	0.000	331.191
8	(Ontario) Rachel Homan	0.000	325.931
9	(Scotland) Eve Muirhead	0.000	283.984
10	(United States) Tabitha Peterson	0.000	245.427

Preceded by 2019–20	2020–21 curling season August 2020 – May 2021	Succeeded by 2021–22
