= Tallinn Masters Mixed Doubles =

World Curling Tour event

The Tallinn Masters Mixed Doubles is an annual mixed doubles curling tournament, that was on the ISS Mixed Doubles World Curling Tour from 2018 to 2024. It is held annually at the Tondiraba Ice Hall in Tallinn, Estonia.

The purse for the event is €6,000, and the winning team receives €1,200.

While it was part of the tour, its event categorization is 300 (highest calibre is 1000).

The event began as a Champions Curling Tour event in 2017.

For local teams, the event serves as a preparation for the Estonian Mixed Doubles Curling Championship, with the winner qualifying to represent Estonia at the World Mixed Doubles Curling Championship. The 2022 event only had teams from Estonia, Lithuania and Finland.

== Past champions ==
Year	Winning pair	Runner up pair	Third place	Fourth place	Purse
2017	(Hungary) Ildikó Szekeres / György Nagy	(Estonia) Marie Turmann / Harri Lill	(Estonia) Maile Mölder / Erkki Lill	(Estonia) Triin Madisson / Karl Kukner	€1,500
2018	(Czech Republic) Zuzana Hájková / Tomáš Paul	(Estonia) Marie Turmann / Harri Lill	(Switzerland) Michelle Gribi / Reto Gribi	(Scotland) Jayne Stirling / Fraser Kingan	€1,250
2019	(Russia) Anastasia Moskaleva / Alexander Eremin	(Estonia) Marie Turmann / Harri Lill	(Hungary) Dorottya Palancsa / Zsolt Kiss	(Finland) Oona Kauste / Aku Kauste	€1,250
2020	(Russia) Anastasia Moskaleva / Alexander Eremin	(Norway) Kristin Moen Skaslien / Magnus Nedregotten	(Switzerland) Daniela Rupp / Kevin Wunderlin	(Russia) Margarita Fomina / Alexey Stukalskiy	€3,000
2021	(Russia) Nkeiruka Ezekh / Alexei Stukalskiy	(Hungary) Dorottya Palancsa / Zsolt Kiss	(Czech Republic) Zuzana Paulová / Tomáš Paul	(Russia) Anastasia Moskaleva / Alexander Eremin	€3,325
2022	(Finland) Oona Kauste / Aku Kauste	(Estonia) Marie Kaldvee / Harri Lill	(Estonia) Triin Madisson / Karl Kukner	(Estonia) Kaidi Elmik / Mihhail Vlassov	€3,325
2023	(Norway) Martine Rønning / Mathias Brænden	(Estonia) Marie Kaldvee / Harri Lill	(Switzerland) Vanessa Tonoli / (Netherlands) Wouter Gösgens	(Finland) Bonnie Nilhamn / Paavo Kuosmanen	€3,325
2024	(Germany) Emira Abbes / Klaudius Harsch	(Poland) Adela Walczak / Andrzej Augustyniak	(Estonia) Marie Kaldvee / Harri Lill	(Germany) Pia-Lisa Schöll / Joshua Sutor	€3,325
2025	(Norway) Kristin Moen Skaslien / Magnus Nedregotten	(Estonia) Marie Kaldvee / Harri Lill	(Germany) Emira Abbes / Klaudius Harsch	(Switzerland) Laura Engler / Kevin Wunderlin	€ 3,400
2026	(Norway) Kristin Moen Skaslien / Magnus Nedregotten	(Japan) Tori Koana / Go Aoki	(Sweden) Therese Westman / Robin Ahlberg	(Switzerland) Briar Schwaller / Yannick Schwaller	€6,000
