= Scottish Mixed Doubles Curling Championship =

National curling championship

- Established: 2007
- 2026 host city: Aberdeen
- 2026 arena: Curl Aberdeen
- 2026 champion: Vicky Drummond / Euan Kyle

The Scottish Mixed Doubles Curling Championship is the national curling championship for mixed doubles in Scotland. The Championship has been held annually since 2007 and the winners proceed to represent Scotland at the World Mixed Doubles Curling Championship.

The 2019 champions were Gina Aitken and Scott Andrews, who went through the 12-team 2018 Championships undefeated with Duncan Menzies filling in for an injured Andrews. At the 2019 World Mixed Doubles Championship they finished the round robin with a 6-1 record before losing in the first round of the playoffs to Estonia.

The 2020 Mixed Doubles Championship was held 27 February - 1 March, 2020 at the Dewars Centre in Perth.

In 2022, Eve Muirhead and Bobby Lammie went undefeated through the entire championship, beating Jennifer Dodds and Bruce Mouat in the final 9-2 after 5 ends.

== Past champions ==
Champions, runners-up and semifinalists since the championship was started in 2007:

Year	(gold) Winning team	(silver) Runner-up team	(bronze) Semifinalists		Host
2007	Kelly Wood / Logan Gray	Judith Carr / Dillan Pirras			Murrayfield Curling Rink, Edinburgh
2008	Victoria Sloan / Keith MacLennan	Tasha Aitken / David Aitken			Murrayfield Curling Rink, Edinburgh
2009	Rachael Simms / Logan Gray				Murrayfield Curling Rink, Edinburgh
2010	Louise Soutar / Paul Stevenson	Judith McFarlane / Lee McCleary			Murrayfield Curling Rink, Edinburgh
2011	Judith McFarlane / Lee McCleary	Jill Donald / Adrian White			Murrayfield Curling Rink, Edinburgh
2012	Gina Aitken / Bruce Mouat	Claire Sloan / Graham Shedden			Dewars Centre, Perth
2013	Gina Aitken / Bruce Mouat	Judith McCleary / Lee McCleary			Dewars Centre, Perth
2014	Judith McCleary / Lee McCleary	Lauren Gray / Logan Gray	Gina Aitken / Bruce Mouat	Rowena Kerr / Grant Hardie	Braehead Curling, Glasgow
2015	Gina Aitken / Bruce Mouat	Abigail Brown / Grant Hardie	Hailey Duff / John Duff	Judith McCleary / Lee McCleary	Braehead Curling, Glasgow
2016	Gina Aitken / Bruce Mouat	Judith McCleary / Lee McCleary	Sophie Jackson / Ross Whyte	Karina Aitken / David Aitken	Braehead Curling, Glasgow
2017	Jayne Stirling / Fraser Kingan	Rachel Hannen / Bobby Lammie	Naomi Brown / Euan Kyle	Judith McCleary / Lee McCleary	Curl Aberdeen, Aberdeen
2018	Gina Aitken / Duncan Menzies	Jayne Stirling / Fraser Kingan	Judith McCleary / Lee McCleary	Alice Spence / Craig Waddell	Braehead Curling, Glasgow
2020	Jennifer Dodds / Bruce Mouat	Gina Aitken / Scott Andrews	Eve Muirhead / Bobby Lammie		Dewars Centre, Perth
2022	Eve Muirhead / Bobby Lammie	Jennifer Dodds / Bruce Mouat	Katie McMillan / Mark Watt	Hailey Duff / Hammy McMillan Jr.	Dewars Centre, Perth
2023	Jennifer Dodds / Bruce Mouat	Sophie Jackson / Duncan McFadzean	Gina Aitken / Grant Hardie	Amy MacDonald / Blair Haswell	Dewars Centre, Perth
2024	Sophie Jackson / Duncan McFadzean	Lisa Davie / Mark Watt	Rebecca Morrison / Kyle Waddell	Gina Aitken / Grant Hardie	Dewars Centre, Perth
2025	Sophie Sinclair / Robin Brydone	Sophie Jackson / Duncan McFadzean	Katie McMillan / Angus Bryce	Lisa Davie / Mark Watt	Curl Aberdeen, Aberdeen
2026 (Mar.)	Katie McMillan / Angus Bryce	Lisa Davie / Mark Watt	Amy Mitchell / Kaleb Johnston	Laura Watt / Kyle Waddell	Curl Aberdeen, Aberdeen
2026 (Oct.)	Vicky Drummond / Euan Kyle	Katie McMillan / Archie Hyslop	Jennifer Dodds / Orrin Carson	Sophie Jackson / Duncan McFadzean	Curl Aberdeen, Aberdeen

== See also ==
- Scottish Men's Curling Championship
- Scottish Women's Curling Championship
- Scottish Mixed Curling Championship
- Scottish Junior Curling Championships
- Scottish Senior Curling Championships
- Scottish Schools Curling Championship
- Scottish Wheelchair Curling Championship
