= WCT Tallinn Mixed Doubles International =

World Curling Tour event

- Established: 2016
- Host city: Tallinn, Estonia
- Arena: Tondiraba Ice Hall
- Purse: € 6,000
- 2026 champion: (Norway) Kjærland / Brænden

The WCT Tallinn Mixed Doubles International is an annual mixed doubles curling tournament on the ISS Mixed Doubles World Curling Tour. It is held annually in mid-September at the Tondiraba Ice Hall in Tallinn, Estonia.

The purse for the event is € 3,325 and its event categorization is 300 (the highest calibre is 1000).

The event has been held since 2016.

The 2021 event featured many of the teams that had qualified for the 2022 Winter Olympics.

== Past champions ==
Year	Winning pair	Runner up pair	Third place	Fourth place	Purse
2016	(Norway) Kristin Skaslien / Magnus Nedregotten	(Finland) Oona Kauste / Tomi Rantamäki	(Hungary) Ildikó Szekeres / György Nagy	(Estonia) Maile Mölder / Erkki Lill	
2017	(Estonia) Marie Turmann / Harri Lill	(Switzerland) Melanie Barbezat / Matthias Perret	(Switzerland) Jenny Perret / Martin Rios	(Finland) Oona Kauste / Tomi Rantamäki	€ 1,500
2018	(Switzerland) Jenny Perret / Martin Rios	(Norway) Kristin Skaslien / Magnus Nedregotten	(Russia) Anastasia Moskaleva / Alexander Eremin	(Switzerland) Daniela Rupp / Kevin Wunderlin	€ 1,200
2019	(Norway) Kristin Skaslien / Magnus Nedregotten	(Czech Republic) Zuzana Paulová / Tomáš Paul	(Switzerland) Daniela Rupp / Kevin Wunderlin	(Switzerland) Jenny Perret / Martin Rios	€ 1,200
2020	(Sweden) Emma Sjödin / Niklas Edin	(Scotland) Jayne Stirling / Fraser Kingan	(Finland) Oona Kauste / Aku Kauste	(Sweden) Johanna Heldin / Daniel Magnusson	€ 3,325
2021	(Czech Republic) Zuzana Paulová / Tomáš Paul	(Italy) Stefania Constantini / Amos Mosaner	(Norway) Kristin Skaslien / Magnus Nedregotten	(Germany) Pia-Lisa Schöll / Klaudius Harsch	€ 3,325
2022	(Norway) Martine Rønning / Mathias Brænden	(Latvia) Daina Barone / Arnis Veidemanis	(Germany) Pia-Lisa Schöll / Klaudius Harsch	(Norway) Maia Ramsfjell / Magnus Ramsfjell	€ 3,325
2023	(Norway) Kristin Skaslien / Magnus Nedregotten	(Norway) Martine Rønning / Mathias Brænden	(Estonia) Marie Kaldvee / Harri Lill	(Norway) Maia Ramsfjell / Magnus Ramsfjell	€ 4,000
2024	(Czech Republic) Julie Zelingrová / Vít Chabičovský	(Norway) Kristin Skaslien / Magnus Nedregotten	(Estonia) Marie Kaldvee / Harri Lill	(Czech Republic) Zuzana Paulová / Tomáš Paul	€ 3,400
2025	(China) Ye Zixuan / Yu Sen	(Norway) Kristin Skaslien / Magnus Nedregotten	(Estonia) Marie Kaldvee / Harri Lill	(Sweden) Therese Westman / Robin Ahlberg	€ 6,000
2026	(Norway) Eilin Kjærland / Mathias Brænden	(Sweden) Therese Westman / Robin Ahlberg	(Norway) Maia Ramsfjell / Magnus Ramsfjell	(Latvia) Katrīna Gaidule / Roberts Reinis Buncis	€ 6,000
