= Vicky Drummond =

Scottish curler

Vicky Drummond MBE
- Curler
- Born: Victoria Wright; 15 August 1993 (age 33); Dumfries, Scotland

Team
- Curling club: Leswalt CC, Leswalt, Scotland
- Mixed doubles partner: Euan Kyle

Curling career
- Member Association: Scotland; Great Britain
- World Championship: 2 (2018, 2021)
- World Mixed Doubles Championship: 1 (2027)
- European Championship: 3 (2018, 2019, 2021)
- Olympic: 1 (2022)
Medal record
Women's Curling
Representing Great Britain
Olympic Games
Gold medal – first place	2022 Beijing
Representing Scotland
European Curling Championship
Gold medal – first place	2021 Lillehammer
Silver medal – second place	2019 Helsingborg
Scottish Women's Curling Championship
Gold medal – first place	2018 Perth
Gold medal – first place	2020 Perth
Silver medal – second place	2016 Perth
Silver medal – second place	2017 Perth
Silver medal – second place	2019 Perth
Bronze medal – third place	2014 Perth
World Junior Curling Championships
Silver medal – second place	2013 Sochi
Scottish Mixed Doubles Championship
Gold medal – first place	2026 Aberdeen

Vicky Drummond MBE (born 15 August 1993), better known by her birth name Vicky Wright, is a Scottish curler from Stranraer, and 2022 Olympic Champion in women's curling, playing third on Team Muirhead. Drummond was appointed Member of the Order of the British Empire (MBE) in the 2022 Birthday Honours for services to curling.

Drummond also supported the BBC's coverage of the Milano Cortina 2026 Winter Olympics, commentating and analysing the curling events alongside Steve Cram, Jackie Lockhart and Logan Gray.

== Career ==
=== Juniors ===
Drummond curled in Juniors on Team Hannah Fleming. She was the alternate for Scotland at the 2013 World Junior Curling Championships, where the team won a silver medal.

=== Women's ===
Drummond won her first Scottish Women's Curling Championship in 2018 as lead for Fleming to qualify for her first World Championship. At the 2018 World Women's Curling Championship, the team struggled, finishing the round robin with a 5–7 record.

For the 2018–19 season, Drummond joined team Muirhead as the alternate. She played for the team at the first leg of the 2018–19 Curling World Cup as Muirhead had a hip injury. They finished in sixth with a 2–4 record. She played in her first European Curling Championships at the 2018 European Curling Championships. The team had a disappointing performance, finishing with a 4–5 record and missing the playoffs. At the 2019 Scottish Women's Curling Championships, the team qualified for the final but lost to Sophie Jackson 11–7. To finish off the season, Team Muirhead won the 2019 WCT Arctic Cup.

The following season, Drummond replaced Vicki Chalmers on the team due to Chalmers stepping away from competitive curling. The team won their first event of the 2019–20 season, the 2019 Cameron's Brewing Oakville Fall Classic. At the 2019 European Curling Championships, the Muirhead rink reached the final where they lost to Sweden's Anna Hasselborg, claiming the silver medal. In early January, they won the Mercure Perth Masters. Team Muirhead claimed the 2020 Scottish Women's Curling Championship by defeating Maggie Wilson 8–3 in the championship game. The team was set to represent Scotland at the 2020 World Women's Curling Championship before the event got cancelled due to the COVID-19 pandemic. In Grand Slam play, they played in three events and qualified in one of them, the 2019 National where they lost in the quarterfinals to Jennifer Jones.

Due to the ongoing pandemic, a limited number of tour events were held during the 2020–21 season. Team Muirhead did play in a series of domestic events put on by the British Curling Association, where they won the January Challenge event and finished runner-up to Team Gina Aitken in the Elite Finals. A "curling bubble" was set up in Calgary, Canada in the spring, which hosted several events, including the 2021 World Women's Curling Championship and two slams. Team Muirhead competed in both the 2021 Champions Cup and the 2021 Players' Championship, failing to qualify at both events. The next week, the team represented Scotland at the World's, finishing with a disappointing 6–7, in eighth place.

Because of Scotland's disappointing finish at the 2021 World Championship, the country was relegated to compete in the 2021 Olympic Qualification Event to earn their spot in the 2022 Winter Olympics. To maximize its chances of securing Olympic qualification, British Curling implemented a squad system for nine of its top-level female curlers, five of which would make the team for the 2021 European Curling Championships and the Olympic Qualification Event. The nine players alternated teams and lineups throughout the five tryout events they competed in: the 2021 Euro Super Series, the 2021 Saint Petersburg Classic, the 2021 The Challenger, the 2021 Women's Masters Basel and the 2021 Curlers Corner Autumn Gold Curling Classic. Drummond had successful results at each of the five events, winning The Challenger and finishing runner-up at the Saint Petersburg Classic. She also made the semifinal of the Euro Super Series. On 25 October 2021, British Curling officially announced its team for the European Championship: skip Eve Muirhead, Drummond at third, second Jennifer Dodds, lead Hailey Duff and alternate Mili Smith. It was the same lineup that claimed the title at The Challenger. Prior to the Europeans, the new look Team Muirhead competed in the WCT Tallinn Ladies Challenger where they went undefeated to claim the title.

At the European Championship, the team was the class of the field, finishing 8–1 through the round robin and qualifying for the playoffs as the number one seed. In the semifinal, they defeated Germany's Daniela Jentsch 7–4 and then went on to win the gold medal by defeating Sweden's Anna Hasselborg by the same score. It was Scotland's first European women's title since 2017. Their win at the European Championship secured their spot as the British team for the Olympic Qualification Event. There, the team posted a 6–2 record through the round robin, finishing tied for first with South Korea's Kim Eun-jung and Japan's Satsuki Fujisawa. The tie for the first Olympic spot was broken by draw shot challenge totals, which Great Britain had the best of between the three rinks. This earned the team direct qualification into the Olympic Games without having to play in the qualification games. On 23 December 2021, Muirhead, Drummond, Dodds, Duff, and Smith were officially named to the British Olympic team.

At the Games, the British team had mixed results through the round robin. Always remaining in the middle of the pact, the team won their last round robin game over the ROC to finish with a 5–4 record, tied for third with Japan's Fujisawa and Canada's Jennifer Jones. Once again, due to draw shot challenge tiebreaking totals, the team qualified for the playoffs, this time as the third seed. In the semifinal, they faced Sweden's Hasselborg in a rematch of the 2021 European final. Things did not get off to a good start for the team, giving up four points in the first end. They managed to battle their way back, however, stealing a single in the fifth end to tie the score at five-all. After taking four in the ninth end for a commanding 11–8 lead, Sweden scored three in the tenth end to tie the game and force an extra end. There, Muirhead secured the single point for a 12–11 victory and a spot for the team in the gold medal game. In the final, the British team was dominant against Fujisawa's Japanese team, never trailing en route to a 10–3 victory and the Olympic gold medal. The "golden girls" ended their incredible season with a quarterfinal finish at the 2022 Players' Championship.

On 17 May 2022, Drummond announced her retirement from the sport.

=== Mixed doubles ===
In 2026, she announced she was returning to the sport to compete with Euan Kyle in mixed doubles. In their first year together, Drummond and Kyle won the 2026 Scottish Mixed Doubles Championship, going undefeated in the event and qualifying for the 2027 World Mixed Doubles Curling Championship.

== Personal life ==
Drummond studied nursing at Glasgow Caledonian University, and works as a nurse at Forth Valley Royal Hospital in Larbert. She is married to fellow curler Greg Drummond. In her youth she was also a swimmer. She currently lives in Stirling.

== Teams ==
=== Women's ===
Season	Skip	Third	Second	Lead	Alternate
2011–12	Jennifer Dodds	Rebecca Kesley	Mhairi Baird	Vicky Wright	
2012–13	Jennifer Martin	Hazel Smith	Vicky Wright	Mhairi Baird	
2013–14	Jennifer Martin	Hazel Smith	Vicky Wright	Mhairi Baird	
2014–15	Lauren Gray	Jennifer Dodds	Vicky Wright	Mhairi Baird	
2015–16	Lauren Gray	Jennifer Dodds	Vicky Wright	Mhairi Baird	
2016–17	Hannah Fleming	Jennifer Dodds	Alice Spence	Vicky Wright	
2017–18	Hannah Fleming	Jennifer Dodds	Alice Spence	Vicky Wright	Sophie Jackson
2018–19	Eve Muirhead	Jennifer Dodds	Vicki Chalmers	Lauren Gray	Vicky Wright
2019–20	Eve Muirhead	Lauren Gray	Jennifer Dodds	Vicky Wright	
2020–21	Eve Muirhead	Vicky Wright	Jennifer Dodds	Lauren Gray	Sophie Sinclair
2021–22	Eve Muirhead	Vicky Wright	Jennifer Dodds	Hailey Duff	Mili Smith

=== Mixed doubles ===
Season	Female	Male
2026–27	Vicky Drummond	Euan Kyle
