= 2018 World Mixed Doubles Curling Championship =

- Host city: Östersund, Sweden
- Arena: Östersund Arena
- Dates: April 21–28, 2018
- Winner: Switzerland
- Female: Michèle Jäggi
- Male: Sven Michel
- Coach: Sebastian Stock
- Finalist: Russia

The 2018 World Mixed Doubles Curling Championship was held from April 21 to 28 at the Östersund Arena in Östersund, Sweden. The event was held in conjunction with the 2018 World Senior Curling Championships.

== Teams ==
Australia	Austria	Belarus	Brazil	Canada
Female: Lynn Hewitt; Male: Dean Hewitt	Female: Anna Weghuber; Male: Markus Schagerl	Female: Tatsiana Tarsunova; Male: Ilya Shalamitski	Female: Aline Gonçalves; Male: Marcio Cerquinho	Female: Laura Crocker; Male: Kirk Muyres
China	Croatia	Czech Republic	Denmark	England
Female: Fu Yiwei; Male: Ma Yanlong	Female: Lucija Fabijanić; Male: Ognjen Golubić	Female: Zuzana Hájková; Male: Tomáš Paul	Female: Christine Vita Grønbech; Male: Martin Uhd Grønbech	Female: Anna Fowler; Male: Tom Jaeggi
Estonia	Finland	France	Germany	Guyana
Female: Marie Turmann; Male: Harri Lill	Female: Oona Kauste; Male: Tomi Rantamäki	Female: Sandrine Morand; Male: Romain Borini	Female: Julia Meißner; Male: Andy Büttner	Female: Farzana Hussain; Male: Rayad Hussain
Hong Kong	Hungary	Ireland	Israel	Italy
Female: Ling-Yue Hung; Male: Jason Chang	Female: Ildikó Szekeres; Male: György Nagy	Female: Jen Ward; Male: Eoin McCrossan	Female: Elana Sone; Male: Leonid Rivkind	Female: Veronica Zappone; Male: Simone Gonin
Japan	Kazakhstan	Latvia	Lithuania	Luxembourg
Female: Satsuki Fujisawa; Male: Tsuyoshi Yamaguchi	Female: Sitora Alliyarova; Male: Abylaikhan Zhuzbay	Female: Santa Blumberga; Male: Ritvars Gulbis	Female: Virginija Paulauskaitė; Male: Tadas Vyskupaitis	Female: Karen Wauters; Male: Marco Etienne
Netherlands	New Zealand	Norway	Poland	Romania
Female: Lisenka Bomas; Male: Bob Bomas	Female: Eleanor Adviento; Male: Brett Sargon	Female: Maia Ramsfjell; Male: Magnus Ramsfjell	Female: Katarzyna Staszczak; Male: Aleksander Grzelka	Female: Iulia Traila; Male: Allen Coliban
Russia	Scotland	Slovakia	Slovenia	South Korea
Female: Maria Komarova; Male: Daniil Goriachev	Female: Jayne Stirling; Male: Fraser Kingan	Female: Daniela Matulová; Male: Milan Moravčík	Female: Nina Kremžar; Male: Lan Žagar	Female: Jang Hye-ji; Male: Lee Ki-jeong
Spain	Sweden	Switzerland	Turkey	United States
Female: Irantzu García; Male: Gontzal García	Female: Camilla Noreen; Male: Per Noreen	Female: Michèle Jäggi; Male: Sven Michel	Female: Dilşat Yıldız; Male: Uğurcan Karagöz	Female: Sarah Anderson; Male: Korey Dropkin

== Round-robin standings ==
Final round-robin standings

Key
Teams to Playoffs

Group A	W	L
Switzerland	6	1
United States	6	1
Italy	6	1
Australia	4	3
Latvia	3	4
Slovenia	2	5
Luxembourg	1	6
Netherlands	0	7

Group B	W	L
Norway	7	0
Hungary	5	2
Turkey	5	2
Denmark	4	3
Belarus	3	4
England	3	4
Romania	1	6
Croatia	0	7

Group C	W	L
Estonia	7	0
Japan	5	2
Russia	5	2
Finland	3	4
Kazakhstan	3	4
Lithuania	3	4
Poland	1	6
New Zealand	1	6

Group D	W	L
Sweden	6	1
Scotland	6	1
China	5	2
France	3	4
Spain	3	4
Hong Kong	2	5
Slovakia	2	5
Israel	1	6

Group E	W	L
South Korea	7	0
Canada	6	1
Czech Republic	5	2
Brazil	3	4
Guyana	3	4
Germany	3	4
Austria	1	6
Ireland	0	7

== Round-robin results ==
All draw times are listed in CEST (UTC+2)

=== Group A ===
==== Saturday, April 21 ====
Draw 1 9:00

Sheet A	1	2	3	4	5	6	7	8	Final
Netherlands	1	0	1	0	0	1	0	1	4
Latvia	0	1	0	2	2	0	2	0	7

Sheet B	1	2	3	4	5	6	7	8	Final
Australia	0	0	1	0	1	0	2	X	4
Italy	2	2	0	2	0	2	0	X	8

Sheet C	1	2	3	4	5	6	7	8	Final
Luxembourg	1	0	0	0	1	0	X	X	2
United States	0	2	3	3	0	6	X	X	14

Draw 4 20:00

Sheet A	1	2	3	4	5	6	7	8	Final
Slovenia	0	2	0	0	0	0	0	X	2
Switzerland	2	0	1	1	2	1	3	X	10

==== Sunday, April 22 ====
Draw 6 11:15

Sheet A	1	2	3	4	5	6	7	8	Final
Latvia	3	1	2	2	3	2	X	X	13
Luxembourg	0	0	0	0	0	0	X	X	0

Draw 7 14:30

Sheet C	1	2	3	4	5	6	7	8	Final
Australia	0	2	1	1	3	0	0	0	7
Switzerland	3	0	0	0	0	2	2	1	8

Draw 8 17:45

Sheet E	1	2	3	4	5	6	7	8	Final
Slovenia	0	0	2	0	1	0	1	X	4
Latvia	2	2	0	1	0	1	0	X	6

Draw 9 21:00

Sheet C	1	2	3	4	5	6	7	8	Final
Netherlands	0	0	0	0	0	0	0	X	0
Luxembourg	1	2	1	1	2	1	1	X	9

Sheet D	1	2	3	4	5	6	7	8	Final
Italy	1	1	2	0	0	1	0	0	5
United States	0	0	0	3	1	0	1	1	6

==== Monday, April 23 ====
Draw 10 8:00

Sheet E	1	2	3	4	5	6	7	8	9	Final
Latvia	0	0	1	0	1	0	3	1	0	6
Australia	2	1	0	2	0	1	0	0	2	8

Draw 13 17:45

Sheet A	1	2	3	4	5	6	7	8	Final
Italy	3	3	2	0	3	2	X	X	13
Netherlands	0	0	0	1	0	0	X	X	1

Sheet B	1	2	3	4	5	6	7	8	Final
Luxembourg	0	0	1	0	0	0	0	X	1
Switzerland	2	1	0	1	3	1	2	X	10

Sheet E	1	2	3	4	5	6	7	8	Final
United States	3	0	5	1	2	0	X	X	11
Slovenia	0	1	0	0	0	2	X	X	3

==== Tuesday, April 24 ====
Draw 15 8:00

Sheet C	1	2	3	4	5	6	7	8	Final
Slovenia	1	1	0	1	0	3	0	X	6
Australia	0	0	3	0	2	0	3	X	8

Sheet E	1	2	3	4	5	6	7	8	Final
Netherlands	0	0	0	0	0	0	X	X	0
Switzerland	3	2	1	1	4	4	X	X	15

Draw 16 11:15

Sheet B	1	2	3	4	5	6	7	8	Final
United States	1	0	0	1	1	2	0	X	5
Latvia	0	1	1	0	0	0	1	X	3

Draw 17 14:30

Sheet B	1	2	3	4	5	6	7	8	Final
Italy	3	1	2	1	1	0	3	X	11
Slovenia	0	0	0	0	0	3	0	X	3

Sheet D	1	2	3	4	5	6	7	8	Final
Australia	0	1	0	1	2	3	1	X	8
Luxembourg	1	0	1	0	0	0	0	X	2

Draw 18 17:45

Sheet C	1	2	3	4	5	6	7	8	Final
United States	2	1	0	2	1	2	3	X	11
Netherlands	0	0	1	0	0	0	0	X	1

==== Wednesday, April 25 ====
Draw 20 8:00

Sheet C	1	2	3	4	5	6	7	8	Final
Latvia	0	0	1	1	0	2	0	X	4
Italy	1	3	0	0	2	0	1	X	7

Draw 22 14:30

Sheet A	1	2	3	4	5	6	7	8	Final
Switzerland	3	1	0	0	0	1	1	0	6
Italy	0	0	1	1	1	0	0	4	7

Draw 24 21:00

Sheet A	1	2	3	4	5	6	7	8	Final
Luxembourg	0	2	0	2	0	2	0	X	6
Slovenia	1	0	1	0	4	0	4	X	10

Sheet B	1	2	3	4	5	6	7	8	Final
Switzerland	2	3	0	0	2	0	3	X	10
United States	0	0	1	1	0	2	0	X	4

Sheet D	1	2	3	4	5	6	7	8	Final
Netherlands	0	0	0	3	0	1	0	X	4
Australia	2	2	3	0	2	0	3	X	12

==== Thursday, April 26 ====
Draw 26 12:30

Sheet A	1	2	3	4	5	6	7	8	9	Final
Australia	0	4	0	1	0	1	1	0	0	7
United States	2	0	3	0	1	0	0	1	1	8

Draw 27 16:00

Sheet B	1	2	3	4	5	6	7	8	Final
Slovenia	3	3	0	3	0	3	X	X	12
Netherlands	0	0	1	0	2	0	X	X	3

Sheet D	1	2	3	4	5	6	7	8	Final
Switzerland	3	1	2	0	0	1	0	4	11
Latvia	0	0	0	3	3	0	3	0	9

Sheet E	1	2	3	4	5	6	7	8	Final
Luxembourg	0	1	0	1	0	0	X	X	2
Italy	6	0	3	0	3	3	X	X	15

=== Group B ===
==== Saturday, April 21 ====
Draw 1 9:00

Sheet D	1	2	3	4	5	6	7	8	Final
Croatia	0	0	2	0	0	0	0	X	2
Denmark	3	2	0	4	1	3	2	X	15

Draw 3 16:30

Sheet A	1	2	3	4	5	6	7	8	Final
England	1	1	2	0	0	0	0	X	4
Hungary	0	0	0	3	4	2	2	X	11

Sheet B	1	2	3	4	5	6	7	8	Final
Romania	0	0	0	2	0	0	0	X	2
Norway	2	1	1	0	1	1	1	X	7

Sheet D	1	2	3	4	5	6	7	8	Final
Belarus	0	4	1	0	0	0	0	1	6
Turkey	3	0	0	1	1	1	3	0	9

==== Sunday, April 22 ====
Draw 5 8:00

Sheet B	1	2	3	4	5	6	7	8	Final
England	0	1	0	0	0	3	0	X	4
Turkey	1	0	2	1	3	0	2	X	9

Sheet C	1	2	3	4	5	6	7	8	Final
Belarus	1	3	2	1	2	1	X	X	10
Romania	0	0	0	0	0	0	X	X	0

Sheet D	1	2	3	4	5	6	7	8	Final
Denmark	0	1	1	0	0	1	0	X	3
Norway	1	0	0	5	1	0	3	X	10

Sheet E	1	2	3	4	5	6	7	8	Final
Croatia	0	1	0	0	1	0	X	X	2
Hungary	5	0	5	1	0	1	X	X	12

==== Monday, April 23 ====
Draw 11 11:15

Sheet B	1	2	3	4	5	6	7	8	Final
Croatia	0	3	0	0	1	0	X	X	4
Belarus	4	0	5	2	0	2	X	X	13

Draw 12 14:30

Sheet A	1	2	3	4	5	6	7	8	Final
Turkey	0	2	1	0	1	2	0	1	7
Denmark	3	0	0	1	0	0	2	0	6

Sheet B	1	2	3	4	5	6	7	8	Final
Romania	0	0	0	1	0	0	X	X	1
Hungary	2	3	5	0	4	2	X	X	16

Draw 14 21:00

Sheet C	1	2	3	4	5	6	7	8	Final
Norway	1	0	0	3	2	0	2	4	12
England	0	1	1	0	0	4	0	0	6

==== Tuesday, April 24 ====
Draw 15 8:00

Sheet B	1	2	3	4	5	6	7	8	Final
Hungary	1	0	2	0	1	0	2	0	6
Denmark	0	1	0	2	0	3	0	2	8

Sheet D	1	2	3	4	5	6	7	8	Final
Turkey	4	0	1	2	0	0	0	2	9
Romania	0	1	0	0	2	1	1	0	5

Draw 17 14:30

Sheet A	1	2	3	4	5	6	7	8	Final
Belarus	2	0	0	2	0	2	1	X	7
England	0	2	1	0	1	0	0	X	4

Draw 18 17:45

Sheet A	1	2	3	4	5	6	7	8	Final
Romania	0	0	0	5	0	3	1	0	9
Croatia	3	1	1	0	1	0	0	1	7

Sheet E	1	2	3	4	5	6	7	8	Final
Norway	2	0	2	0	3	0	0	4	11
Turkey	0	2	0	1	0	2	1	0	6

Draw 19 21:00

Sheet C	1	2	3	4	5	6	7	8	Final
England	3	3	0	2	0	0	2	0	10
Denmark	0	0	2	0	4	1	0	1	8

==== Wednesday, April 25 ====
Draw 20 8:00

Sheet A	1	2	3	4	5	6	7	8	Final
Croatia	2	0	3	0	0	0	X	X	5
Norway	0	4	0	5	3	2	X	X	14

Draw 21 11:15

Sheet D	1	2	3	4	5	6	7	8	Final
Hungary	1	1	1	0	0	0	3	1	7
Belarus	0	0	0	1	1	1	0	0	3

Draw 22 14:30

Sheet D	1	2	3	4	5	6	7	8	Final
England	3	1	1	0	1	2	0	X	8
Croatia	0	0	0	1	0	0	3	X	4

Draw 23 17:45

Sheet A	1	2	3	4	5	6	7	8	Final
Hungary	1	1	1	0	2	0	0	1	6
Turkey	0	0	0	2	0	1	1	0	4

Sheet E	1	2	3	4	5	6	7	8	Final
Belarus	0	2	1	3	1	0	1	0	8
Norway	3	0	0	0	0	2	0	4	9

Draw 24 21:00

Sheet E	1	2	3	4	5	6	7	8	Final
Denmark	0	3	1	1	0	3	0	2	10
Romania	1	0	0	0	3	0	2	0	6

==== Thursday, April 26 ====
Draw 28 19:30

Sheet A	1	2	3	4	5	6	7	8	Final
Denmark	1	1	0	2	1	1	0	X	6
Belarus	0	0	2	0	0	0	1	X	3

Sheet C	1	2	3	4	5	6	7	8	Final
Turkey	5	2	3	1	3	2	X	X	16
Croatia	0	0	0	0	0	0	X	X	0

Sheet D	1	2	3	4	5	6	7	8	Final
Norway	2	0	3	1	0	1	1	X	8
Hungary	0	1	0	0	2	0	0	X	3

Sheet E	1	2	3	4	5	6	7	8	9	Final
Romania	0	1	0	2	0	0	2	3	0	8
England	3	0	1	0	3	1	0	0	1	9

=== Group C ===
==== Saturday, April 21 ====
Draw 2 12:30

Sheet B	1	2	3	4	5	6	7	8	Final
Kazakhstan	1	1	0	0	2	0	1	0	5
Finland	0	0	1	3	0	1	0	2	7

Draw 3 16:30

Sheet C	1	2	3	4	5	6	7	8	Final
Russia	4	1	0	1	2	1	2	X	11
Lithuania	0	0	1	0	0	0	0	X	1

Draw 4 20:00

Sheet A	1	2	3	4	5	6	7	8	9	Final
Japan	0	3	0	1	0	0	2	0	0	6
New Zealand	1	0	1	0	2	1	0	1	1	7

Sheet C	1	2	3	4	5	6	7	8	Final
Poland	0	0	0	1	0	3	1	X	5
Estonia	3	2	1	0	2	0	0	X	8

==== Sunday, April 22 ====
Draw 6 11:15

Sheet B	1	2	3	4	5	6	7	8	Final
New Zealand	0	2	0	1	1	1	2	0	7
Lithuania	2	0	5	0	0	0	0	1	8

Sheet C	1	2	3	4	5	6	7	8	Final
Kazakhstan	0	0	1	0	3	0	1	0	5
Russia	3	1	0	1	0	1	0	1	7

Sheet D	1	2	3	4	5	6	7	8	Final
Japan	0	2	0	2	0	1	1	0	6
Estonia	1	0	3	0	2	0	0	1	7

Draw 7 14:30

Sheet A	1	2	3	4	5	6	7	8	Final
Finland	0	2	0	1	0	0	2	1	6
Poland	1	0	1	0	1	1	0	0	4

Draw 9 21:00

Sheet A	1	2	3	4	5	6	7	8	Final
Russia	0	1	0	1	0	0	1	X	3
Estonia	2	0	3	0	1	1	0	X	7

Sheet E	1	2	3	4	5	6	7	8	Final
Finland	4	1	0	1	2	0	3	X	11
New Zealand	0	0	1	0	0	2	0	X	3

==== Monday, April 23 ====
Draw 11 11:15

Sheet E	1	2	3	4	5	6	7	8	Final
Poland	1	0	2	0	1	0	2	0	6
Lithuania	0	0	0	3	0	1	0	5	9

Draw 13 17:45

Sheet D	1	2	3	4	5	6	7	8	Final
New Zealand	1	0	1	0	0	2	0	X	4
Russia	0	2	0	5	1	0	1	X	9

Draw 14 21:00

Sheet A	1	2	3	4	5	6	7	8	Final
Lithuania	2	0	1	1	0	2	0	0	6
Kazakhstan	0	3	0	0	1	0	2	1	7

Sheet B	1	2	3	4	5	6	7	8	Final
Japan	2	1	1	1	1	0	4	X	10
Poland	0	0	0	0	0	2	0	X	2

Sheet E	1	2	3	4	5	6	7	8	Final
Estonia	2	0	0	1	0	3	3	X	9
Finland	0	1	1	0	2	0	0	X	4

==== Tuesday, April 24 ====
Draw 16 11:15

Sheet C	1	2	3	4	5	6	7	8	Final
Lithuania	0	1	0	3	0	2	0	1	7
Finland	1	0	1	0	2	0	1	0	5

Sheet E	1	2	3	4	5	6	7	8	Final
Kazakhstan	0	1	0	1	1	0	1	X	4
Estonia	1	0	3	0	0	3	0	X	7

Draw 17 14:30

Sheet C	1	2	3	4	5	6	7	8	Final
New Zealand	1	0	0	2	1	0	1	1	6
Poland	0	4	2	0	0	1	0	0	7

Sheet E	1	2	3	4	5	6	7	8	9	Final
Russia	1	0	1	0	0	2	0	2	0	6
Japan	0	2	0	1	2	0	1	0	1	7

==== Wednesday, April 25 ====
Draw 20 8:00

Sheet B	1	2	3	4	5	6	7	8	Final
Lithuania	0	0	0	1	0	0	1	X	2
Japan	2	1	1	0	1	1	0	X	6

Sheet D	1	2	3	4	5	6	7	8	Final
Poland	1	0	0	2	0	1	0	1	5
Kazakhstan	0	3	1	0	3	0	2	0	9

Draw 22 14:30

Sheet B	1	2	3	4	5	6	7	8	Final
Estonia	1	2	4	0	0	5	X	X	12
New Zealand	0	0	0	3	1	0	X	X	4

Sheet E	1	2	3	4	5	6	7	8	Final
Japan	3	0	2	0	3	0	3	X	11
Kazakhstan	0	1	0	1	0	1	0	X	3

Draw 23 17:45

Sheet D	1	2	3	4	5	6	7	8	Final
Russia	3	0	2	1	0	2	1	X	9
Finland	0	2	0	0	2	0	0	X	4

==== Thursday, April 26 ====
Draw 25 9:00

Sheet D	1	2	3	4	5	6	7	8	Final
Estonia	1	3	0	0	0	6	0	X	10
Lithuania	0	0	1	1	1	0	2	X	5

Draw 26 12:30

Sheet D	1	2	3	4	5	6	7	8	Final
Kazakhstan	3	0	0	3	1	0	5	X	12
New Zealand	0	2	1	0	0	2	0	X	5

Draw 27 16:00

Sheet C	1	2	3	4	5	6	7	8	9	Final
Finland	0	0	1	2	0	1	0	1	0	5
Japan	2	1	0	0	1	0	1	0	1	6

Draw 28 19:30

Sheet E	1	2	3	4	5	6	7	8	Final
Poland	0	1	0	0	0	2	0	X	3
Russia	5	0	2	1	2	0	3	X	13

=== Group D ===
==== Saturday, April 21 ====
Draw 1 9:00

Sheet E	1	2	3	4	5	6	7	8	Final
Scotland	1	0	6	1	3	1	X	X	12
Israel	0	1	0	0	0	0	X	X	1

Draw 2 12:30

Sheet D	1	2	3	4	5	6	7	8	Final
France	0	0	1	0	3	0	2	0	6
China	2	3	0	1	0	1	0	3	10

Sheet E	1	2	3	4	5	6	7	8	Final
Slovakia	0	2	0	0	0	0	0	0	2
Sweden	1	0	1	1	1	3	1	2	10

Draw 3 16:30

Sheet E	1	2	3	4	5	6	7	8	Final
Spain	0	2	0	3	0	1	0	X	6
Hong Kong	1	0	1	0	1	0	1	X	4

==== Sunday, April 22 ====
Draw 5 8:00

Sheet A	1	2	3	4	5	6	7	8	Final
Spain	0	0	0	1	0	1	2	X	4
France	1	1	2	0	2	0	0	X	6

Draw 8 17:45

Sheet A	1	2	3	4	5	6	7	8	Final
China	0	1	2	0	2	0	0	X	L
Sweden	2	0	0	2	0	1	3	X	W

China ran out of time, and therefore forfeited the game.

Sheet B	1	2	3	4	5	6	7	8	Final
Spain	0	0	2	1	4	1	1	X	9
Israel	3	1	0	0	0	0	0	X	4

Sheet C	1	2	3	4	5	6	7	8	Final
France	1	0	1	1	2	0	4	X	9
Hong Kong	0	1	0	0	0	2	0	X	3

Sheet D	1	2	3	4	5	6	7	8	Final
Slovakia	0	1	0	0	1	1	0	0	3
Scotland	2	0	2	1	0	0	1	4	10

==== Monday, April 23 ====
Draw 10 8:00

Sheet A	1	2	3	4	5	6	7	8	Final
Hong Kong	3	0	0	2	0	0	2	1	8
Slovakia	0	1	1	0	1	2	0	0	5

Sheet B	1	2	3	4	5	6	7	8	Final
Scotland	1	1	1	1	0	2	0	X	6
France	0	0	0	0	1	0	1	X	2

Sheet C	1	2	3	4	5	6	7	8	Final
China	4	0	2	1	0	2	2	X	11
Israel	0	1	0	0	1	0	0	X	2

Draw 11 11:15

Sheet D	1	2	3	4	5	6	7	8	Final
Sweden	0	0	0	0	0	2	0	X	2
Spain	1	1	1	1	2	0	2	X	8

Draw 12 14:30

Sheet B	1	2	3	4	5	6	7	8	Final
Slovakia	0	1	1	1	0	1	1	0	5
China	1	0	0	0	3	0	0	3	7

Sheet D	1	2	3	4	5	6	7	8	Final
Israel	1	0	1	0	1	1	0	0	4
Hong Kong	0	1	0	1	0	0	3	1	6

Draw 13 17:45

Sheet C	1	2	3	4	5	6	7	8	Final
Scotland	0	3	0	1	1	1	0	0	6
Sweden	1	0	1	0	0	0	5	1	8

==== Tuesday, April 24 ====
Draw 18 17:45

Sheet B	1	2	3	4	5	6	7	8	Final
Hong Kong	0	0	1	0	0	0	X	X	1
Scotland	2	1	0	2	2	5	X	X	12

Draw 19 21:00

Sheet A	1	2	3	4	5	6	7	8	Final
Sweden	2	1	3	1	0	1	2	X	10
Israel	0	0	0	0	1	0	0	X	1

Sheet B	1	2	3	4	5	6	7	8	Final
China	1	0	4	0	2	1	0	1	9
Spain	0	1	0	3	0	0	1	0	5

Sheet E	1	2	3	4	5	6	7	8	Final
France	4	1	1	1	1	1	X	X	9
Slovakia	0	0	0	0	0	0	X	X	0

==== Wednesday, April 25 ====
Draw 21 11:15

Sheet B	1	2	3	4	5	6	7	8	Final
France	0	1	0	2	0	1	0	X	4
Sweden	3	0	2	0	3	0	2	X	10

Sheet C	1	2	3	4	5	6	7	8	Final
Spain	2	0	1	0	2	0	1	0	6
Scotland	0	1	0	2	0	4	0	1	8

Sheet E	1	2	3	4	5	6	7	8	Final
Hong Kong	0	0	1	0	0	1	0	X	2
China	4	1	0	2	1	0	4	X	12

Draw 22 14:30

Sheet C	1	2	3	4	5	6	7	8	Final
Israel	0	0	0	1	0	1	3	0	5
Slovakia	2	1	2	0	2	0	0	3	10

==== Thursday, April 26 ====
Draw 25 8:00

Sheet A	1	2	3	4	5	6	7	8	9	Final
Slovakia	0	1	3	2	0	3	0	0	1	10
Spain	4	0	0	0	1	0	3	1	0	9

Sheet B	1	2	3	4	5	6	7	8	Final
Sweden	3	1	1	2	2	2	X	X	11
Hong Kong	0	0	0	0	0	0	X	X	0

Draw 26 12:30

Sheet E	1	2	3	4	5	6	7	8	Final
Israel	2	1	1	0	1	1	2	X	8
France	0	0	0	3	0	0	0	X	3

Draw 27 16:00

Sheet A	1	2	3	4	5	6	7	8	Final
Scotland	0	3	0	2	0	0	3	X	8
China	1	0	1	0	1	2	0	X	5

=== Group E ===
==== Saturday, April 21 ====
Draw 2 12:30

Sheet A	1	2	3	4	5	6	7	8	Final
South Korea	4	3	2	0	1	1	0	X	11
Austria	0	0	0	1	0	0	1	X	2

Sheet C	1	2	3	4	5	6	7	8	Final
Ireland	0	0	0	0	0	0	X	X	0
Canada	5	2	1	1	1	2	X	X	12

Draw 4 20:00

Sheet B	1	2	3	4	5	6	7	8	Final
Guyana	0	2	0	0	2	0	2	0	6
Germany	1	0	1	2	0	3	0	1	8

Sheet E	1	2	3	4	5	6	7	8	Final
Brazil	0	0	0	1	0	0	0	X	1
Czech Republic	1	1	1	0	1	1	1	X	6

==== Sunday, April 22 ====
Draw 6 11:15

Sheet E	1	2	3	4	5	6	7	8	Final
Guyana	0	0	0	0	0	0	X	X	0
South Korea	2	2	1	1	3	2	X	X	11

Draw 7 14:30

Sheet B	1	2	3	4	5	6	7	8	Final
Czech Republic	3	0	1	4	1	0	2	X	11
Ireland	0	1	0	0	0	1	0	X	2

Sheet D	1	2	3	4	5	6	7	8	Final
Brazil	3	1	1	1	0	2	0	X	8
Germany	0	0	0	0	2	0	2	X	4

Sheet E	1	2	3	4	5	6	7	8	Final
Canada	0	1	0	1	1	2	1	1	7
Austria	1	0	2	0	0	0	0	0	3

Draw 9 21:00

Sheet B	1	2	3	4	5	6	7	8	Final
Canada	1	0	1	1	0	1	0	3	7
Brazil	0	3	0	0	1	0	1	0	5

==== Monday, April 23 ====
Draw 10 8:00

Sheet D	1	2	3	4	5	6	7	8	Final
Ireland	0	0	0	0	0	1	X	X	1
South Korea	1	1	2	2	4	0	X	X	10

Draw 11 11:15

Sheet A	1	2	3	4	5	6	7	8	Final
Canada	2	2	1	1	0	3	X	X	9
Guyana	0	0	0	0	3	0	X	X	3

Sheet C	1	2	3	4	5	6	7	8	Final
Brazil	1	2	0	0	1	1	0	3	8
Austria	0	0	2	1	0	0	2	0	5

Draw 12 14:30

Sheet E	1	2	3	4	5	6	7	8	Final
South Korea	1	0	0	1	2	1	0	X	5
Germany	0	1	1	0	0	0	1	X	3

Draw 14 21:00

Sheet D	1	2	3	4	5	6	7	8	Final
Germany	0	0	2	0	1	0	1	0	4
Czech Republic	1	1	0	2	0	2	0	2	8

==== Tuesday, April 24 ====
Draw 15 8:00

Sheet A	1	2	3	4	5	6	7	8	Final
Brazil	1	0	0	1	0	0	0	X	2
South Korea	0	1	1	0	3	4	1	X	10

Draw 16 11:15

Sheet A	1	2	3	4	5	6	7	8	Final
Germany	0	1	1	2	1	1	0	4	10
Ireland	1	0	0	0	0	0	4	0	5

Sheet D	1	2	3	4	5	6	7	8	Final
Austria	0	4	1	0	0	0	1	X	6
Guyana	1	0	0	1	2	5	0	X	9

Draw 18 17:45

Sheet D	1	2	3	4	5	6	7	8	Final
Czech Republic	0	1	0	0	1	0	1	X	3
Canada	2	0	4	1	0	2	0	X	9

Draw 19 21:00

Sheet D	1	2	3	4	5	6	7	8	Final
Guyana	3	1	0	1	3	0	3	X	11
Ireland	0	0	3	0	0	1	0	X	4

==== Wednesday, April 25 ====
Draw 20 8:00

Sheet E	1	2	3	4	5	6	7	8	Final
Germany	0	1	0	0	2	0	1	X	4
Canada	2	0	1	1	0	5	0	X	9

Draw 21 11:15

Sheet A	1	2	3	4	5	6	7	8	Final
Austria	0	0	1	0	0	0	X	X	1
Czech Republic	1	3	0	2	1	3	X	X	10

Draw 23 17:45

Sheet B	1	2	3	4	5	6	7	8	Final
Ireland	0	1	0	2	0	0	X	X	3
Austria	2	0	4	0	4	1	X	X	11

Sheet C	1	2	3	4	5	6	7	8	Final
Guyana	0	2	1	0	0	1	1	1	6
Brazil	1	0	0	1	1	0	0	0	3

Draw 24 21:00

Sheet C	1	2	3	4	5	6	7	8	9	Final
South Korea	0	1	0	1	0	2	0	4	1	9
Czech Republic	1	0	1	0	4	0	2	0	0	8

==== Thursday, April 26 ====
Draw 25 9:00

Sheet C	1	2	3	4	5	6	7	8	Final
Austria	0	0	0	2	0	3	1	0	6
Germany	1	2	2	0	1	0	0	2	8

Sheet E	1	2	3	4	5	6	7	8	Final
Ireland	2	1	1	0	0	0	2	0	6
Brazil	0	0	0	4	1	1	0	1	7

Draw 26 12:30

Sheet B	1	2	3	4	5	6	7	8	Final
South Korea	0	3	0	2	1	0	2	X	8
Canada	1	0	1	0	0	3	0	X	5

Sheet C	1	2	3	4	5	6	7	8	Final
Czech Republic	1	2	2	2	0	3	X	X	10
Guyana	0	0	0	0	1	0	X	X	1

== Playoffs ==
=== Bracket ===
Round of 16
1	South Korea	9
16	Finland	7
8	Scotland	2
9	Japan	10
4	Norway	1
13	Russia	8
5	Sweden	8
12	China	5
2	Switzerland	6
15	Italy	5
7	United States	4
10	Hungary	7
3	Estonia	8
14	Turkey	11
6	Canada	8
11	Czech Republic	6

Second round
1	South Korea	6
9	Japan	5
13	Russia	8
5	Sweden	5
2	Switzerland	8
10	Hungary	5
14	Turkey	4
6	Canada	7

Semifinals
1	South Korea	4
13	Russia	6
2	Switzerland	7
6	Canada	5

Gold Medal Game
13	Russia	6
2	Switzerland	9
Bronze Medal Game
1	South Korea	3
6	Canada	8

5–8th place semifinals
9	Japan	8
5	Sweden	7
10	Hungary	8
14	Turkey	3

5th place game
9	Japan	9
10	Hungary	2
7th place game
5	Sweden	8
14	Turkey	5

9–16th place quarterfinals
16	Finland	4
8	Scotland	8
4	Norway	6
12	China	3
15	Italy	6
7	United States	5
3	Estonia	6
11	Czech Republic	7

9–12th semifinals
8	Scotland	6
4	Norway	5
15	Italy	5
11	Czech Republic	9

9th place game
8	Scotland	8
11	Czech Republic	6
11th place game
4	Norway	11
15	Italy	9

=== Round of 16 ===
Friday, April 27, 9:00

Team	1	2	3	4	5	6	7	8	Final
South Korea	4	1	0	0	4	0	0	X	9
Finland	0	0	2	1	0	3	1	X	7

Player percentages
South Korea		Finland	
Jang Hye-ji	77%	Oona Kauste	72%
Lee Ki-jeong	79%	Tomi Rantamäki	60%
Total	78%	Total	65%

Team	1	2	3	4	5	6	7	8	Final
Scotland	0	0	1	0	1	0	0	X	2
Japan	1	2	0	2	0	3	2	X	10

Player percentages
Scotland		Japan	
Jayne Stirling	54%	Satsuki Fujisawa	77%
Fraser Kingan	76%	Tsuyoshi Yamaguchi	77%
Total	67%	Total	77%

Team	1	2	3	4	5	6	7	8	Final
Norway	0	0	1	0	0	0	0	X	1
Russia	2	2	0	1	1	1	1	X	8

Player percentages
Norway		Russia	
Maia Ramsfjell	56%	Maria Komarova	86%
Magnus Ramsfjell	62%	Daniil Goriachev	89%
Total	60%	Total	88%

Team	1	2	3	4	5	6	7	8	Final
Sweden	2	0	1	2	2	0	1	0	8
China	0	2	0	0	0	2	0	1	5

Player percentages
Sweden		China	
Camilla Noreen	73%	Fu Yiwei	58%
Per Noreen	64%	Yanlong Ma	72%
Total	67%	Total	67%

Friday, April 27, 12:30

Team	1	2	3	4	5	6	7	8	Final
Switzerland	2	0	1	0	2	0	1	0	6
Italy	0	1	0	2	0	1	0	1	5

Player percentages
Switzerland		Italy	
Michèle Jäggi	67%	Veronica Zappone	80%
Sven Michel	74%	Simone Gonin	65%
Total	71%	Total	71%

Team	1	2	3	4	5	6	7	8	Final
United States	0	0	0	1	0	3	0	X	4
Hungary	1	1	1	0	2	0	2	X	7

Player percentages
United States		Hungary	
Sarah Anderson	77%	Ildikó Szekeres	78%
Korey Dropkin	85%	György Nagy	76%
Total	82%	Total	77%

Team	1	2	3	4	5	6	7	8	Final
Estonia	2	0	4	0	1	0	1	0	8
Turkey	0	3	0	2	0	3	0	3	11

Player percentages
Estonia		Turkey	
Marie Turmann	66%	Dilşat Yıldız	68%
Harri Lill	83%	Uğurcan Karagöz	76%
Total	76%	Total	73%

Team	1	2	3	4	5	6	7	8	Final
Canada	3	0	3	0	1	0	1	0	8
Czech Republic	0	2	0	1	0	2	0	1	6

Player percentages
Canada		Czech Republic	
Laura Crocker	75%	Zuzana Hájková	62%
Kirk Muyres	82%	Tomáš Paul	76%
Total	79%	Total	71%

=== 9th–16th Quarterfinals ===
Friday, April 27, 16:00

Team	1	2	3	4	5	6	7	8	Final
Finland	0	0	1	1	0	2	0	X	4
Scotland	1	2	0	0	3	0	2	X	8

Player percentages
Finland		Scotland	
Oona Kauste	67%	Jayne Stirling	66%
Tomi Rantamäki	65%	Fraser Kingan	67%
Total	66%	Total	67%

Team	1	2	3	4	5	6	7	8	Final
Norway	0	2	1	0	2	1	0	X	6
China	1	0	0	1	0	0	1	X	3

Player percentages
Norway		China	
Maia Ramsfjell	63%	Fu Yiwei	63%
Magnus Ramsfjell	78%	Ma Yanlong	47%
Total	72%	Total	53%

Team	1	2	3	4	5	6	7	8	Final
Italy	0	1	0	1	0	2	0	2	6
United States	1	0	1	0	2	0	1	0	5

Player percentages
Italy		United States	
Veronica Zappone	81%	Sarah Anderson	64%
Simone Gonin	59%	Korey Dropkin	71%
Total	68%	Total	68%

Team	1	2	3	4	5	6	7	8	9	Final
Estonia	2	0	2	0	0	1	0	1	0	6
Czech Republic	0	1	0	1	2	0	2	0	1	7

Player percentages
Estonia		Czech Republic	
Marie Turmann	63%	Zuzana Hájková	71%
Harri Lill	67%	Tomáš Paul	64%
Total	65%	Total	67%

=== Quarterfinals ===
Friday, April 27, 19:30

Team	1	2	3	4	5	6	7	8	Final
South Korea	0	1	0	1	0	2	0	2	6
Japan	1	0	1	0	2	0	1	0	5

Player percentages
South Korea		Japan	
Jang Hye-ji	73%	Satsuki Fujisawa	64%
Lee Ki-jeong	64%	Tsuyoshi Yamaguchi	81%
Total	68%	Total	74%

Team	1	2	3	4	5	6	7	8	Final
Russia	1	0	1	0	2	0	3	1	8
Sweden	0	1	0	2	0	2	0	0	5

Player percentages
Russia		Sweden	
Maria Komarova	73%	Camilla Noreen	67%
Daniil Goriachev	67%	Per Noreen	71%
Total	69%	Total	69%

Team	1	2	3	4	5	6	7	8	Final
Switzerland	0	3	2	0	2	0	1	X	8
Hungary	1	0	0	2	0	2	0	X	5

Player percentages
Switzerland		Hungary	
Michèle Jäggi	67%	Ildikó Szekeres	61%
Sven Michel	70%	György Nagy	53%
Total	69%	Total	56%

Team	1	2	3	4	5	6	7	8	Final
Turkey	0	1	0	1	0	0	2	0	4
Canada	2	0	2	0	1	1	0	1	7

Player percentages
Turkey		Canada	
Dilşat Yıldız	78%	Laura Crocker	86%
Uğurcan Karagöz	82%	Kirk Muyres	78%
Total	81%	Total	81%

=== 9th–12th Semifinals ===
Saturday, April 28, 8:30

Team	1	2	3	4	5	6	7	8	9	Final
Scotland	1	1	0	1	1	0	0	1	1	6
Norway	0	0	2	0	0	2	1	0	0	5

Player percentages
Scotland		Norway	
Jayne Stirling	71%	Maia Ramsfjell	67%
Fraser Kingan	68%	Magnus Ramsfjell	67%
Total	69%	Total	67%

Team	1	2	3	4	5	6	7	8	Final
Italy	1	0	0	0	0	3	1	X	5
Czech Republic	0	5	1	1	2	0	0	X	9

Player percentages
Italy		Czech Republic	
Veronica Zappone	38%	Zuzana Hájková	62%
Simone Gonin	70%	Tomáš Paul	78%
Total	57%	Total	72%

=== 11 v 12 ===
Saturday, April 28, 12:00

Team	1	2	3	4	5	6	7	8	Final
Norway	4	0	4	0	1	0	2	0	11
Italy	0	2	0	4	0	2	0	1	9

Player percentages
Norway		Italy	
Maia Ramsfjell	63%	Veronica Zappone	65%
Magnus Ramsfjell	73%	Simone Gonin	66%
Total	69%	Total	66%

=== 5th–8th Semifinals ===
Saturday, April 28, 12:00

Team	1	2	3	4	5	6	7	8	Final
Japan	0	5	0	1	0	2	0	0	8
Sweden	1	0	2	0	2	0	1	1	7

Player percentages
Japan		Sweden	
Satsuki Fujisawa	72%	Camilla Noreen	69%
Tsuyoshi Yamaguchi	74%	Per Noreen	70%
Total	73%	Total	70%

Team	1	2	3	4	5	6	7	8	Final
Hungary	3	2	1	1	0	1	0	X	8
Turkey	0	0	0	0	1	0	2	X	3

Player percentages
Hungary		Turkey	
Ildikó Szekeres	77%	Dilşat Yıldız	29%
György Nagy	74%	Uğurcan Karagöz	50%
Total	75%	Total	42%

=== Semifinals ===
Saturday, April 28, 12:00

Team	1	2	3	4	5	6	7	8	Final
South Korea	0	0	1	0	2	0	0	1	4
Russia	1	1	0	1	0	2	1	0	6

Player percentages
South Korea		Russia	
Jang Hye-ji	61%	Maria Komarova	63%
Lee Ki-jeong	65%	Daniil Goriachev	70%
Total	63%	Total	67%

Team	1	2	3	4	5	6	7	8	Final
Switzerland	0	2	2	0	1	1	0	1	7
Canada	1	0	0	1	0	0	3	0	5

Player percentages
Switzerland		Canada	
Michèle Jäggi	80%	Laura Crocker	61%
Sven Michel	78%	Kirk Muyres	67%
Total	79%	Total	64%

=== 9 v 10 ===
Saturday, April 28, 16:00

Team	1	2	3	4	5	6	7	8	Final
Scotland	0	0	3	2	2	0	1	0	8
Czech Republic	1	1	0	0	0	3	0	1	6

Player percentages
Scotland		Czech Republic	
Jayne Stirling	63%	Zuzana Hájková	58%
Fraser Kingan	78%	Tomáš Paul	59%
Total	72%	Total	59%

=== 7 v 8 ===
Saturday, April 28, 16:00

Team	1	2	3	4	5	6	7	8	Final
Sweden	0	4	1	0	2	0	0	1	8
Turkey	2	0	0	1	0	1	1	0	5

Player percentages
Sweden		Turkey	
Camilla Noreen	70%	Dilşat Yıldız	42%
Per Noreen	74%	Uğurcan Karagöz	68%
Total	72%	Total	58%

=== 5 v 6 ===
Saturday, April 28, 16:00

Team	1	2	3	4	5	6	7	8	Final
Japan	1	0	3	1	2	0	2	X	9
Hungary	0	0	0	0	0	2	0	X	2

Player percentages
Japan		Hungary	
Satsuki Fujisawa	66%	Ildikó Szekeres	58%
Tsuyoshi Yamaguchi	94%	György Nagy	63%
Total	83%	Total	61%

=== Bronze medal game ===
Saturday, April 28, 16:00

Team	1	2	3	4	5	6	7	8	Final
South Korea	1	0	1	0	0	1	0	X	3
Canada	0	1	0	2	1	0	4	X	8

Player percentages
South Korea		Canada	
Jang Hye-ji	63%	Laura Crocker	63%
Lee Ki-jeong	61%	Kirk Muyres	73%
Total	61%	Total	67%

=== Gold medal game ===
Saturday, April 28, 16:00

Team	1	2	3	4	5	6	7	8	Final
Russia	0	2	0	2	0	0	2	0	6
Switzerland	3	0	2	0	1	2	0	1	9

Player percentages
Russia		Switzerland	
Maria Komarova	69%	Michèle Jäggi	95%
Daniil Goriachev	68%	Sven Michel	73%
Total	68%	Total	81%

=== Top 5 Player percentages ===
Round robin only

Males	%
(United States) Korey Dropkin	80
(Japan) Tsuyoshi Yamaguchi	78
(Canada) Kirk Muyres	75
(Switzerland) Sven Michel	75
(Estonia) Harri Lill	75

Females	%
(Japan) Satsuki Fujisawa	75
(Scotland) Jayne Stirling	74
(Estonia) Marie Turmann	74
(Canada) Laura Crocker	72
(Russia) Maria Komarova	71
