= Bruce Mouat =

Scottish curler (born 1994)

- Curler
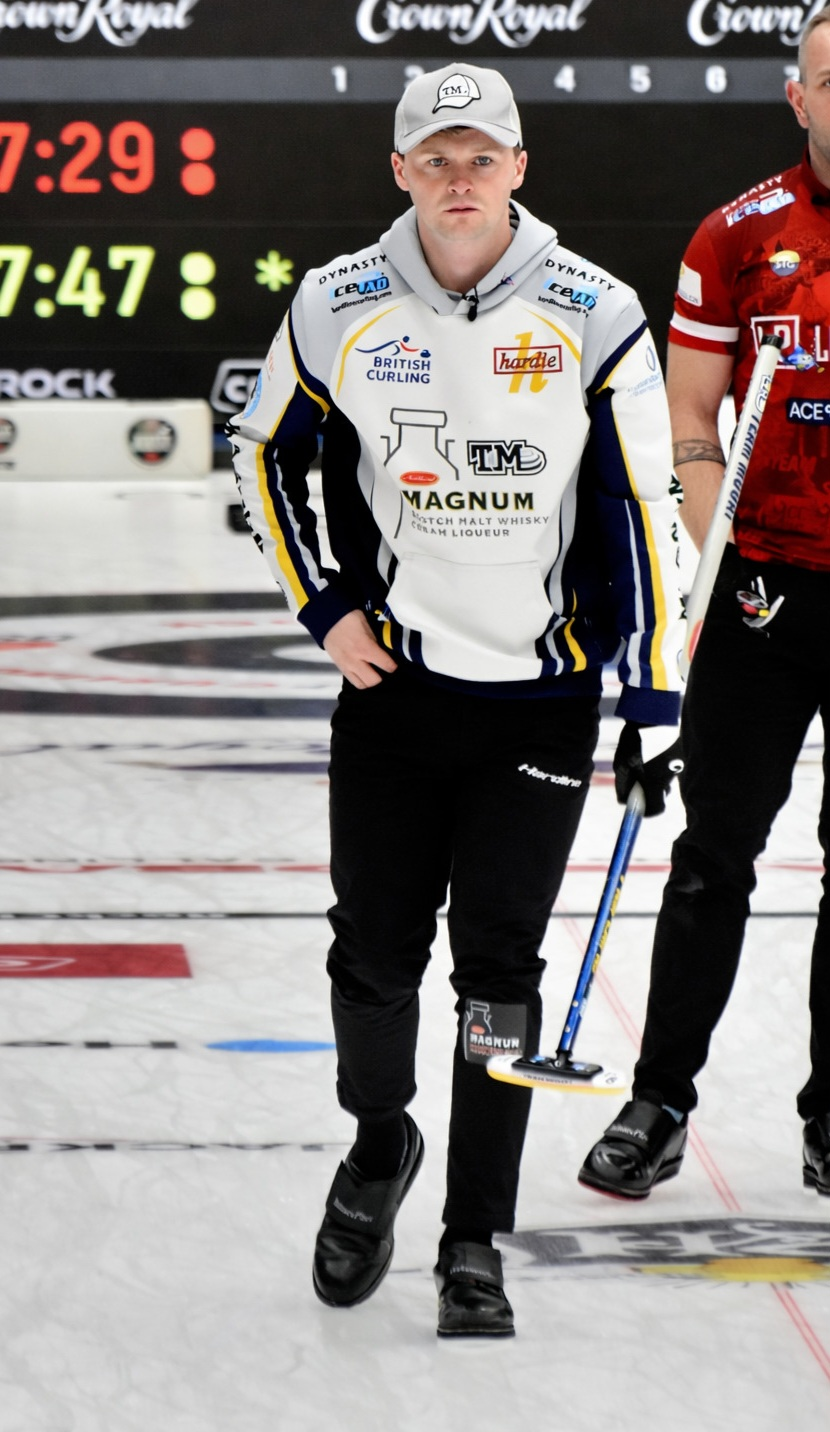
- Mouat at the 2026 Players' Championship
- Born: 27 August 1994 (age 32); Edinburgh, Scotland

Team
- Curling club: Gogar Park CC, Edinburgh, SCO
- Skip: Bruce Mouat
- Third: Robin Brydone
- Second: Bobby Lammie
- Lead: Hammy McMillan Jr.

Curling career
- Member Association: Scotland; Great Britain
- World Championship: 6 (2018, 2019, 2021, 2023, 2024, 2025)
- World Mixed Doubles Championship: 7 (2013, 2014, 2016, 2017, 2021, 2023, 2025)
- European Championship: 6 (2018, 2021, 2022, 2023, 2024, 2025)
- Olympic: 2 (2022, 2026)
- Grand Slam victories: 12 (2017 National, 2021 Champions Cup, 2021 Players', 2021 Masters, 2022 Players', 2024 Canadian Open (Jan.), 2024 Tour Challenge, 2024 Canadian Open (Nov.), 2024 National, 2025 Players', 2025 Tour Challenge, 2025 GSOC Tahoe)
Medal record
Men's curling
Representing Great Britain
Olympic Games
Silver medal – second place	2022 Beijing	Team
Silver medal – second place	2026 Milano Cortina	Team
Winter Universiade
Gold medal – first place	2017 Almaty
Representing Scotland
World Championships
Gold medal – first place	2023 Ottawa
Gold medal – first place	2025 Moose Jaw
Silver medal – second place	2021 Calgary
Bronze medal – third place	2018 Las Vegas
World Mixed Doubles Championship
Gold medal – first place	2021 Aberdeen
Silver medal – second place	2025 Fredericton
European Championships
Gold medal – first place	2018 Tallinn
Gold medal – first place	2021 Lillehammer
Gold medal – first place	2022 Östersund
Gold medal – first place	2023 Aberdeen
Silver medal – second place	2024 Lohja
Bronze medal – third place	2025 Lohja
World Junior Championships
Gold medal – first place	2016 Copenhagen
Bronze medal – third place	2015 Tallinn
Scottish Men's Championship
Gold medal – first place	2018 Perth
Gold medal – first place	2019 Perth
Gold medal – first place	2020 Perth
Gold medal – first place	2023 Dumfries
Silver medal – second place	2017 Perth
Silver medal – second place	2025 Dumfries
Bronze medal – third place	2015 Perth
Bronze medal – third place	2024 Dumfries
Scottish Mixed Doubles Championship
Gold medal – first place	2012 Perth
Gold medal – first place	2013 Perth
Gold medal – first place	2015 Glasgow
Gold medal – first place	2016 Glasgow
Gold medal – first place	2020 Perth
Gold medal – first place	2023 Perth
Silver medal – second place	2022 Perth
Bronze medal – third place	2014 Glasgow

Bruce Mouat (/ˈmaʊət/; born 27 August 1994 in Edinburgh) is a Scottish curler from Edinburgh. He currently skips his own team out of the Gogar Park Curling Club. Mouat has led his team to two world championship titles in 2023 and 2025, four European championship titles (2018, 2021, 2022 and 2023) and twelve Grand Slam titles. He also earned two silver medals in the men's team event of the Winter Olympics (2022, 2026). He is a former World Mixed Doubles (2021), Winter Universiade (2017) and World Junior (2016) champion.

== Career ==
=== Juniors ===
Mouat had a successful junior career, winning two Scottish junior championships in 2015 and 2016. He skipped the Scottish team at the 2015 World Junior Curling Championships, where he led his team of Duncan Menzies, Derrick Sloan and Angus Dowell to a bronze medal. The team had a 6–3 round robin record, which was good enough for third place. They lost to Sweden in the 3 vs. 4 playoff game but won in a re-match against the Swedes in the bronze medal game. Mouat would again skip Scotland at the 2016 World Junior Curling Championships, this time with teammates Bobby Lammie, Gregor Cannon along with Dowell again. The team posted a 7–2 record through the round robin, finishing second. In the playoffs, they would beat the United States' Korey Dropkin in the 1 vs. 2 game and beat them again in the final to claim the gold medal. The following season, Mouat and his reigning world championship rink represented Great Britain at the 2017 Winter Universiade. Once again, the team was dominant, finishing atop the round robin standings with a perfect 9–0 record. After a narrow victory over Norway in the semifinal, the team won 8–6 against Sweden in the gold medal game.

While still in juniors, Team Mouat began competing on the men's tour. Nationally, the team had a bronze medal finish at the 2015 Scottish Men's Curling Championship and a silver medal finish in 2017. The team won their first tour event at the 2015 Dumfries Challenger Series, defeating previous Scottish champion Tom Brewster in the final. They also reached the semifinals of the Challenge Chateau Cartier de Gatineau following wins over established men's teams such as John Epping, Sven Michel and Rasmus Stjerne. As they had won the 2016 World Juniors, the team was invited to compete in their first Grand Slam of Curling event, the 2016 Humpty's Champions Cup. With wins over Niklas Edin and John Shuster, the team earned a tiebreaker berth where they lost to Steve Laycock. In their final season of juniors, the team qualified for the 2016 Tour Challenge Tier 2 event where they again lost in a tiebreaker to Mark Bice.

=== 2017–2022 ===
Out of juniors, Mouat formed a new rink with Grant Hardie, Bobby Lammie and Hammy McMillan Jr. for the 2017–18 season. On tour, the team found immediate success, going undefeated to claim the Stu Sells Oakville Tankard and the Oakville Fall Classic in back-to-back weeks. In both finals, the team beat the Kim Chang-min Korean rink. Later in the season, the Mouat rink would again beat Kim in another final, this time at the 2017 Boost National, the first Grand Slam event of the season. By winning the event, Mouat captured his first career Grand Slam title and became the youngest skip and only the second-ever non-Canadian skip to win a men's Grand Slam event. The team followed this win with their fourth tour win of the season at the Dumfries Challenger Series back home in Scotland. In the new year, the team ran the table to win the 2018 Scottish Men's Curling Championship, defeating the Greg Drummond rink in the final. They then faced the Kyle Smith Olympic team in a best-of-three playoff to determine who would represent Scotland at the 2018 World Men's Curling Championship. Team Mouat won the series two games to one, earning the right to represent the country at their first men's worlds. In preparation for the world championship, the team won another tour event at the Aberdeen International Curling Championship, defeating Yannick Schwaller in the final. At the world championship in Las Vegas, Nevada, the team lost just one game in the round robin to Sweden's Niklas Edin. Their 11–1 record earned them a direct bye to the semifinals where they suffered a 9–5 defeat to Canada's Brad Gushue. Despite this, they ended the week on a positive note with a dominant victory over Korea's Kim in the bronze medal game. The team ended the season at the 2018 Players' Championship and 2018 Humpty's Champions Cup Slam events where they reached the quarterfinals and semifinals respectively.

Team Mouat's first major bonspiel of the 2018–19 season came in September at the first leg of the Curling World Cup, where the team had a third-place finish. Two weeks later, they played in the 2018 Elite 10 Grand Slam event, where they won just one game. A month later, the team was more successful at the 2018 Masters Grand Slam, making it to the semifinals. A month later, Mouat made his debut at the 2018 European Curling Championships. After finishing the round robin with a 7–2 record, Mouat beat Italy's Joël Retornaz and Sweden's Niklas Edin in the semifinal and final to claim the gold medal. Mouat wrapped up the calendar year with another third-place finish at the second leg of the Curling World Cup and a second-place finish at the 2018 National. The National featured the first all-Scotland Grand Slam final as the Mouat rink faced Team Ross Paterson. The team began 2019 by winning the Mercure Perth Masters, followed by a quarterfinal finish at the 2019 Canadian Open. The team then returned to Scotland to defend their Scottish championship, which they won, sending them to the 2019 World Men's Curling Championship in Lethbridge, Alberta. There, the team had a slow 1–3 start, but they managed to turn things around to qualify with an 8–4 record. They then lost to Canada's Kevin Koe in the first playoff round. To wrap the season up, Mouat lost in a tiebreaker at the 2019 Players' Championship and made it to the semifinals at the 2019 Champions Cup.

The Mouat rink did not have a good start to the 2019–20 season as they failed to qualify as the Scottish representatives for the 2019 European Curling Championships. They found better luck in Grand Slam play, however, making it to the semifinals of the 2019 Masters and the 2019 National and the quarterfinals of the 2020 Canadian Open. The team won just one event on tour, defending their championship at the Mercure Perth Masters. In February, Team Mouat won the Scottish Men's Championship for a third year in a row. The team was set to represent Scotland at the 2020 World Men's Curling Championship on home soil in Glasgow before the event got cancelled due to the COVID-19 pandemic. The Scottish championship would be their last event of the season as both the Players' Championship and the Champions Cup Grand Slam events were also cancelled due to the pandemic.

For much of the 2020–21 season, there was no tour due to the pandemic, but Mouat and his team won a series of domestic challenges put on by the British Curling Association. A "curling bubble" was set up in Calgary, Canada, in the Spring, which hosted several events, including the 2021 World Men's Curling Championship and two slams. Mouat represented Scotland at the 2021 Worlds, leading his team to a 9–4 round robin record. In the playoffs, they beat Canada, and RCF (Russia), making it to the final, where they lost to Sweden, skipped by Niklas Edin. A week later, Team Mouat played in the 2021 Champions Cup in the same bubble, winning the event, defeating Team Brendan Bottcher (who had been Team Canada at the Worlds) to claim their second career Slam title. The team continued their impressive run in the bubble during the next event, the 2021 Players' Championship. They would go through pool play as the only undefeated team on both the men's and women's sides with a 5–0 record, earning the team a bye to the semifinals. They continued their undefeated streak in the playoffs, winning the semis and the finals against Brad Gushue to win their second straight Slam title in just six days.

In October 2021, Mouat was announced by British Curling to be the first British curler to represent the country in both the mixed doubles and men's team disciplines at the Olympics. He and Jennifer Dodds would compete in the mixed doubles event, along with his regular team and fifth Ross Whyte in the men's tournament. Mouat had another stellar season in 2021–22. His team started the year by winning the 2021 Stu Sells Oakville Tankard, and then followed it up with winning the 2021 Masters, their fourth Slam title. The team then made another final at the 2021 National which they lost to the Gushue rink. Next for the team was the 2021 European Curling Championships where the team had another dominant performance, winning all eleven of their games en route to another gold medal. At the Olympics, he led Great Britain to an 8–1 round robin record, in first place overall. In the playoffs, he beat the defending champion John Shuster rink from the United States before losing the gold medal to Sweden, skipped by Niklas Edin. Team Mouat continued their success after the Olympics, winning their second slam of the season at the 2022 Players' Championship. The team was awarded the Pinty's Cup as the season's best Grand Slam team after their win. In their final event, Team Mouat faltered for the first time all season, failing to qualify for the playoffs at the 2022 Champions Cup.

=== 2022–present ===
The Scottish team had a slow start to the 2022–23 season, failing to qualify at the 2022 Baden Masters and the 2022 National. They turned things around at the 2022 Tour Challenge with a quarterfinal finish and later a semifinal appearance at the Swiss Cup Basel. At the 2022 European Curling Championships, the team succeeded in defending their title. After losing just one game to Switzerland's Yannick Schwaller in the round robin, Team Mouat defeated the Swiss 5–4 in the gold medal game. The next month, they made it to the final of the 2022 Masters where they lost to Joël Retornaz. In their next event, however, they defeated the Italians in the final of the 2023 Mercure Perth Masters. After a quarterfinal appearance at the 2023 Canadian Open, Team Mouat went undefeated to claim their fourth Scottish men's championship, defeating the James Craik junior rink in the final. At the 2023 World Men's Curling Championship, Mouat led his team to a 10–2 record, enough for a semifinal bye. After defeating Retornaz in an extra end, the team shot a 96 percent game in the final to down Canada's Gushue 9–3 and claim the gold medal. It was Scotland's first world men's title since David Murdoch won the event in 2009. After their world championship success, though, the team failed to qualify at both the 2023 Players' Championship and the 2023 Champions Cup.

The Mouat rink turned things around with a hot start to the 2023–24 season, winning the 2023 Euro Super Series and the 2023 Stu Sells Oakville Tankard. In both finals, the team beat Scottish rivals Team Ross Whyte. They missed the playoffs at the 2023 Tour Challenge but got back on track with a quarterfinal finish at the 2023 National. Next for the team was the 2023 European Curling Championships where they finished second through the round robin with a 7–2 record. They then beat Switzerland's Schwaller in the semifinals before defeating Sweden's Edin 6–5 in an extra end for their fourth European title. In January, they defended their title at the 2024 Mercure Perth Masters by once again defeating the Whyte rink. After having limited success at the previous three Slams, Team Mouat claimed their sixth title with an undefeated run at the 2024 Canadian Open, defeating the Brendan Bottcher rink in the final. This gave Mouat a career Grand Slam, becoming the sixth male skip to do so. At the Scottish championship, the team could not defend their title as they lost out in the semifinal to Team Craik. Despite this, they were still chosen to represent Scotland at the 2024 World Men's Curling Championship over the Ross Whyte rink who had won the Scottish championship. Before Worlds, they claimed another tour title at the Aberdeen International Curling Championship. The team had a strong start to the world championship, finishing third overall with a 10–2 record. After defeating the United States in the first round, they lost both the semifinal and bronze medal game to Canada and Italy, failing to defend their title and finishing fourth. They ended the season with a semifinal finish at the 2024 Players' Championship.

Team Mouat started the 2024–25 season strong, winning the 2024 Tour Challenge over Gushue 10–3. The win gave the Mouat rink their first Tour Challenge win, and with it, Mouat won a championship in each of the tour's five slams in his career (Gushue being the only other skip with this distinction). The Mouat rink continued their winning streak at the 2024 Canadian Open, again beating Gushue in the final 6–3, and going undefeated to win the title. Team Mouat would again represent Scotland at the 2024 European Curling Championships, where the team would go 8–1 in the round robin, but lose to Germany's Marc Muskatewitz 9–7 in the final. The Mouat rink would rebound quickly, winning their third straight 2024-25 Grand Slam title, this time defeating Brad Jacobs Alberta-based rink in the 2024 National final, 5–3. It was a career 9th Slam win for Team Mouat, who finished the event with a 6–1 record. Team Mouat would however lose their second-straight Scottish National Championship, losing to Ross Whyte in the final 8–3. However, as the current #1 ranked team in the world, Mouat was again selected by Scottish Curling to represent Scotland at the 2025 World Men's Curling Championship. At the 2025 Worlds, the Mouat rink made the most of their selection, winning their second World Championship title, beating Switzerland's Schwaller 5–4 in the final.

=== Mixed doubles ===
Mouat showed strong mixed doubles prowess while still competing in juniors. In 2012, he and partner Gina Aitken won the Scottish Mixed Doubles Curling Championship, defeating the pair of Claire Sloan and Graham Shedden in the final. This qualified the team for the 2013 World Mixed Doubles Curling Championship in Fredericton, New Brunswick where they earned a playoff spot with a 6–2 record. In the quarterfinals, they were eliminated following a 6–4 defeat to Sweden. The following year, Aitken and Mouat again won the Scottish championship by defeating Judith and Lee McCleary. At the 2014 World Mixed Doubles Curling Championship, the pair again had a 6–2 record which was just good enough to qualify. They then lost in the round of 16 to reigning world champions Dorottya Palancsa and Zsolt Kiss of Hungary.

After losing in the semifinals in 2014, Aitken and Mouat earned their third national mixed doubles title in 2015, this time beating Abigail Brown and Grant Hardie in the final. The pair would then have their best finish to date at the 2016 World Mixed Doubles Curling Championship, beginning with a 4–2 record in the round robin and a tiebreaker victory over Czech Republic. Once in the playoffs, they defeated the previously undefeated Hungarian and Canadian teams to reach the final four. They then suffered consecutive losses to China and the United States, finishing fourth. The next season, the pair once again beat the McCleary's to defend their title, securing a trip to the 2017 World Mixed Doubles Curling Championship. For the first time, Aitken and Mouat went undefeated through the round robin qualify for the playoffs. They then lost their first playoff game to Canada's Joanne Courtney and Reid Carruthers, ultimately finishing eleventh.

Following a quarterfinal loss at the Scottish championship in 2017, Aitken and Mouat disbanded as a mixed doubles team. Mouat then teamed up with Jennifer Dodds for the 2019–20 season. This partnership saw immediate success as the team went on to win the 2020 national championship, defeating Mouat's former teammate Aitken and Scott Andrews in the final. As the 2020 World Mixed Doubles Curling Championship was cancelled due to the pandemic, Mouat and Dodds instead represented Scotland in 2021. In preparation for the world championship, the pair won two domestic events with a win-loss record of 17–2. Representing Scotland, Dodds and Mouat lost just one game in the round robin to Russia, finishing first in their group with an 8–1 record. After defeating Canada in the semifinal, the pair won Scotland's first world mixed doubles title with a 9–7 victory over Norway's Kristin Skaslien and Magnus Nedregotten in the gold medal game.

With their strong performance at the world championship, Dodds and Mouat were named to the 2022 British Olympic team in October 2021 as the mixed doubles representatives. At the Games, the pair finished with a 6–3 round robin record, enough to qualify for the playoffs in third place. They then lost consecutive games to Norway and Sweden to miss out on a medal, finishing fourth. Despite this, both Dodds and Mouat went on to win medals in the women's and men's events, gold and silver respectively. At the end of the season, the team went undefeated at the national championship until the final where they lost 9–2 to Mouat's teammate Bobby Lammie and Eve Muirhead, who went on to win the world title.

Beginning in the 2022–23 season, Mouat and Dodds started competing on the mixed doubles tour. In their first event, the team won the Hardline Open super series, defeating Laura Walker and Kirk Muyres in the final. They also reached the semifinal of the Winnipeg Open where they were eliminated by Jocelyn Peterman and Brett Gallant. At the Scottish championship, Mouat lost just one game en route to claiming his sixth national doubles title, this time defeating Sophie Jackson and Duncan McFadzean. At the 2023 World Mixed Doubles Curling Championship, Dodds and Mouat again qualified for the playoffs with a 7–2 record but lost in the first playoff round to the United States' Cory Thiesse and Korey Dropkin, the eventual champions. The following season, the pair failed to qualify for the playoffs at the 2024 national championship, finishing with a 3–3 record.

== Personal life ==
Mouat graduated from Edinburgh Napier University in 2017. He is openly gay. He lives in Stirling with his boyfriend Craig Kyle. He is also known for playing with a baseball cap which has gained an internet following through a Twitter account.

== Grand Slam record ==
Key
C	Champion
F	Lost in Final
SF	Lost in Semifinal
QF	Lost in Quarterfinals
R16	Lost in the round of 16
Q	Did not advance to playoffs
T2	Played in Tier 2 event
DNP	Did not participate in event
N/A	Not a Grand Slam event that season

Event	2015–16	2016–17	2017–18	2018–19	2019–20	2020–21	2021–22	2022–23	2023–24	2024–25	2025–26	2026–27
Invitational	DNP	T2	DNP	DNP	Q	N/A	N/A	QF	Q	C	C	Q
Masters	DNP	DNP	DNP	SF	SF	N/A	C	F	Q	SF	SF	F
National	DNP	DNP	C	F	SF	N/A	F	Q	QF	C	C	QF
Open	DNP	DNP	Q	QF	QF	N/A	N/A	QF	C	C	SF	
Players'	DNP	DNP	QF	Q	N/A	C	C	Q	SF	C	Q	
Champions Cup	Q	DNP	SF	SF	N/A	C	Q	Q	N/A	N/A	N/A	N/A
Elite 10	DNP	DNP	DNP	Q	N/A	N/A	N/A	N/A	N/A	N/A	N/A	N/A

== Teams ==
Season	Skip	Third	Second	Lead	Alternate
2011–12	Bruce Mouat	Derrick Sloan	Ross Fraser	Colin Mouat	
2012–13	Bruce Mouat	Duncan Menzies	Derrick Sloan	Angus Dowell	
2013–14	Bruce Mouat	Duncan Menzies	Derrick Sloan	Angus Dowell	
2014–15	Bruce Mouat	Duncan Menzies	Derrick Sloan	Angus Dowell	Bobby Lammie
2015–16	Bruce Mouat	Bobby Lammie	Gregor Cannon	Angus Dowell	Robin Brydone
2016–17	Bruce Mouat	Bobby Lammie	Gregor Cannon	Derrick Sloan	Alasdair Schreiber
2017–18	Bruce Mouat	Grant Hardie	Bobby Lammie	Hammy McMillan Jr.	Ross Paterson (WMCC)
2018–19	Bruce Mouat	Grant Hardie	Bobby Lammie	Hammy McMillan Jr.	Ross Whyte
2019–20	Bruce Mouat	Grant Hardie	Bobby Lammie	Hammy McMillan Jr.	Ross Whyte
2020–21	Bruce Mouat	Grant Hardie	Bobby Lammie	Hammy McMillan Jr.	Ross Whyte
2021–22	Bruce Mouat	Grant Hardie	Bobby Lammie	Hammy McMillan Jr.	Ross Whyte
2022–23	Bruce Mouat	Grant Hardie	Bobby Lammie	Hammy McMillan Jr.	Kyle Waddell
2023–24	Bruce Mouat	Grant Hardie	Bobby Lammie	Hammy McMillan Jr.	Kyle Waddell
2024–25	Bruce Mouat	Grant Hardie	Bobby Lammie	Hammy McMillan Jr.	Kyle Waddell
2025–26	Bruce Mouat	Grant Hardie	Bobby Lammie	Hammy McMillan Jr.	Kyle Waddell
2026–27	Bruce Mouat	Robin Brydone	Bobby Lammie	Hammy McMillan Jr.	
