= Gina Aitken =

Scottish curler

- Curler
- Born: 17 November 1993 (age 32); Paisley, Scotland

Team
- Curling club: Currie & Balerno Curling Club
- Mixed doubles partner: Grant Hardie

Curling career
- Member Association: Scotland
- World Championship: 3 (2022, 2023, 2024)
- World Mixed Doubles Championship: 5 (2013, 2014, 2016, 2017, 2019)
- European Championship: 2 (2022, 2023)
Medal record
Women's curling
Representing Scotland
European Curling Championships
Bronze medal – third place	2022 Östersund
World Junior Curling Championships
Silver medal – second place	2015 Tallinn
Scottish Mixed Doubles Championship
Gold medal – first place	2012 Perth
Gold medal – first place	2013 Perth
Gold medal – first place	2015 Glasgow
Gold medal – first place	2016 Glasgow
Gold medal – first place	2018 Glasgow
Silver medal – second place	2020 Perth
Bronze medal – third place	2014 Glasgow
Bronze medal – third place	2023 Perth
Bronze medal – third place	2024 Perth

Gina Aitken (born 17 November 1993) is a Scottish curler from Edinburgh. She won a silver medal as skip of the Scottish women's team at the 2015 World Junior Curling Championships and has competed in the World Mixed Doubles Curling Championship five times.

== Curling career ==
In back-to-back years, 2014 and 2015, Aitken skipped her team to victory at the Scottish Junior Championships, with teammates Naomi Brown, Rowena Kerr, and Rachel Hannen. At the 2014 World Junior Curling Championships Aitken's team finished the round robin with a 3–6 record, missing the playoffs. Returning to the World Juniors in 2015, they found much more success. Aitken and Team Scotland finished the round robin in second place with a 6–3 record. In the page playoffs, Team Scotland defeated the number one seeded Canada in the 1 vs. 2 game and Sweden in the semifinals, thus setting up a rematch with Team Canada in the final. In the final, Canada, skipped by Kelsey Rocque, got their revenge, defeating Scotland 8–2. Earlier in the 2014–2015 season, Aitken and her juniors team also won bronze at the Scottish Women's Curling Championship, Aitken's best finish at that championship.

Aitken has also competed in the Scottish Mixed Curling Championship, playing third for Bruce Mouat in 2015 and 2016. At the 2016 Championship they won the bronze medal.

Aitken is also prolific in mixed doubles, where she has won the Scottish Mixed Doubles title five times. The first four championships, Aitken competed with her longtime teammate Bruce Mouat. Each Scottish title earned Aitken the right to represent Scotland at the World Mixed Doubles Championship, with her best finish being 4th at the 2016 Championship where they lost to the United States team of Joe Polo and Tabitha Peterson in the bronze medal match.

For the 2018–19 season, Aitken decided to focus on mixed doubles with her new teammate Scott Andrews. Andrews became injured shortly before the Scottish Mixed Doubles Championship, but Duncan Menzies filled in for Andrews and together they won Aitken her fifth Championship. Andrews was healed in time for the 2019 World Mixed Doubles Curling Championship, where they finished tied for 9th place, losing to Team Estonia in the first round of the playoffs.

== Personal life ==
Aitken started curling when she was only seven years old and comes from a curling family: her father David won the 1986 World Juniors, her mother Morna has competed at two World Senior Curling Championships, her sister Karina was the alternate for Aitken's silver medal winning 2015 World Juniors team, and her sister Tasha has also competed at World Juniors.

Aitken graduated with a degree in Film and French from Glasgow University. She currently works in marketing.

== Teams ==
=== Women's ===
Season	Skip	Third	Second	Lead	Events
2011–12	Gina Aitken	Katy Richardson	Rowena Kerr	Rachel Hannen	SWCC (8th)
2012–13	Gina Aitken	Katy Richardson	Rowena Kerr	Fiona Telfer	SWCC (7th)
2013–14	Gina Aitken	Naomi Brown	Rowena Kerr	Katy Richardson	SWCC (5th)
2013–14	Gina Aitken	Naomi Brown	Rowena Kerr	Rachel Hannen	SJCC (gold); WJCC (7th)
2014–15	Gina Aitken	Naomi Brown	Rowena Kerr	Rachel Hannen	SWCC (bronze); SJCC (gold); WJCC (silver)
2015–16	Gina Aitken	Rowena Kerr	Laura Ritchie	Heather Morton	SWCC (7th)
2016–17	Gina Aitken	Rowena Kerr	Rachael Halliday	Rachel Hannen	W. Univ. (5th); SWCC (5th)
2017–18	Claire Hamilton	Gina Aitken	Rachael Halliday	Rachel Hannen	SWCC (SF)
2018–19	Rebecca Morrison (Fourth)	Gina Aitken (Skip)	Mili Smith	Sophie Sinclair	
2019–20	Rebecca Morrison (Fourth)	Gina Aitken (Skip)	Mili Smith	Sophie Sinclair	
2020–21	Rebecca Morrison (Fourth)	Gina Aitken (Skip)	Mili Smith	Sophie Sinclair	
2021–22	Rebecca Morrison	Gina Aitken	Sophie Sinclair	Sophie Jackson	SWCC (gold); ~~2022 WWCC~~
2022–23	Rebecca Morrison	Gina Aitken	Sophie Sinclair	Sophie Jackson	2022 EuCC (bronze); SWCC (gold); 2023 WWCC (12th)
2023–24	Rebecca Morrison	Jennifer Dodds	Gina Aitken / Sophie Sinclair	Sophie Jackson	2023 EuCC (5th); 2024 WWCC

=== Mixed ===
Season	Skip	Third	Second	Lead	Events
2014–15	Bruce Mouat	Gina Aitken	Mark Munro	Rachel Hannen	SMxCC (DNQ)
2015–16	Bruce Mouat	Gina Aitken	Mark Munro	Rachel Hannen	SMxCC (bronze)

=== Mixed doubles ===
Season	Male	Female	Events
2012–13	Bruce Mouat	Gina Aitken	SMDCC (gold); WMDCC (7th)
2013–14	Bruce Mouat	Gina Aitken	SMDCC (gold); WMDCC (9th)
2014–15	Bruce Mouat	Gina Aitken	SMDCC (SF)
2015–16	Bruce Mouat	Gina Aitken	SMDCC (gold); WMDCC (4th)
2016–17	Bruce Mouat	Gina Aitken	SMDCC (gold); WMDCC (11th)
2017–18	Bruce Mouat	Gina Aitken	SMDCC (QF)
2018–19	Scott Andrews; Duncan Menzies	Gina Aitken	SMDCC (gold); WMDCC (9th)
2019–20	Scott Andrews	Gina Aitken	SMDCC (silver)
2020–21	Ross Paterson	Gina Aitken	
2021–22	Euan Kyle	Gina Aitken	SMDCC (QF)
2022–23	Grant Hardie	Gina Aitken	SMDCC (SF)
2023–24	Grant Hardie	Gina Aitken	
