= Fraser Kingan =

Scottish curler

- Curler

Team
- Curling club: New Abbey CC, Dumfries, SCO

Curling career
- Member Association: Scotland
Medal record
Curling
World Junior Championships
Silver medal – second place	2018 Aberdeen
Scottish Mixed Doubles Championship
Gold medal – first place	2017 Aberdeen
Silver medal – second place	2018 Glasgow

Fraser Kingnan is a Scottish curler from Dumfries. He is a former World Junior silver medallist and represented Scotland at the 2018 World Mixed Doubles Curling Championship.

Kingan began curling at around 2006. He won the 2017 Scottish Mixed Doubles Curling Championship, earning him and partner Jayne Stirling the right to represent Scotland at the 2018 World Mixed Doubles Curling Championship. There, the pair went 6–1 in the round robin, before losing to Japan in the round of 16, but won their next three placement games to finish 9th overall. . Earlier that year, he also won the 2018 Scottish Junior Men's Championship, and played on the Scottish team at the 2018 World Junior Curling Championships on home ice in Aberdeen. Playing second for the team, skipped by Ross Whyte, Scotland won a silver medal.

Kingan has had most of his success in the mixed doubles discipline. On the World Curling Tour, he has won the 2018 International Mixed Doubles Dumfries and the Latvian Mixed Doubles Curling Cup 2 with Stirling.
