= Jayne Stirling =

Jayne Stirling is a Scottish curler from Stirling.

After winning the 2017 Scottish mixed doubles championship, Stirling and partner Fraser Kingan represented Scotland at the 2018 World Mixed Doubles Curling Championship. The pair had a 6-1 record in pool play, tied for first in their group. In the playoffs, they lost in the round of 16 to Japan, but won their next three placement games to finish 9th overall.

On the World Curling Tour, Stirling and Kingan won the International Mixed Doubles Dumfries and Latvian Mixed Doubles Curling Cup 2 events in 2018. The next season, the pair won a silver medal at the 2018 New Zealand Winter Games.
