= Swiss Mixed Doubles Curling Championship =

National curling championship

The Swiss Mixed Doubles Curling Championship is the national championship of mixed doubles curling (one man and one woman) in Switzerland. It has been held annually since the 2013–2014 season. The championships are organized by the Swiss Curling Association.

== List of champions and medallists ==
Year	Champion		Runner-up		Bronze	
Year	Woman	Man	Woman	Man	Woman	Man
2014	Michelle Gribi	Reto Gribi	Jenny Perret	Martin Rios	Elena Stern	Romano Meier
2015	Carole Howald	Marc Pfister	Michèle Jäggi	Yves Hess	Isabelle Maillard	Peter de Cruz
2016	Flurina Kobler	Yves Hess	Alina Pätz	Claudio Pätz	Carole Howald	Matthias Perret
2017	Jenny Perret	Martin Rios	Michelle Gribi	Reto Gribi	Michèle Jäggi	Mario Freiberger
2018	Michèle Jäggi	Sven Michel	Michelle Gribi	Reto Gribi	Nadja Grunder	Peter Hartmann
2019	Daniela Rupp	Kevin Wunderlin	Michèle Jäggi	Mario Freiberger	Michelle Gribi	Paddy Käser
2020	Jenny Perret	Martin Rios	Melanie Barbezat	Peter de Cruz	Alina Pätz	Sven Michel
2021	Briar Hürlimann	Yannick Schwaller	Alina Pätz	Sven Michel	Silvana Tirinzoni	Benoît Schwarz
2022	Alina Pätz	Sven Michel	Briar Hürlimann	Yannick Schwaller	Daniela Rupp	Kevin Wunderlin
2023	Briar Schwaller-Hürlimann	Yannick Schwaller	Alina Pätz	Sven Michel	Daniela Rupp	Kevin Wunderlin
2024	Briar Schwaller-Hürlimann	Yannick Schwaller	Carole Howald	Pablo Lachat	Alina Pätz	Sven Michel
2025	Alina Pätz	Sven Michel	Stefanie Berset	Philipp Hösli	Laura Engler	Kevin Wunderlin
2026	Stefanie Berset	Philipp Hösli	Michèle Jäggi	Romano Meier	Jenny Perret	Martin Rios

== Medal record for curlers ==
As of 2026

Curler	Gold	Silver	Bronze
Sven Michel	3	2	2
Briar Schwaller-Hürlimann	3	1	
Yannick Schwaller	3	1	
Alina Pätz	2	3	2
Jenny Perret	2	1	1
Martin Rios	2	1	1
Michèle Jäggi	1	3	1
Michelle Gribi	1	2	1
Reto Gribi	1	2	
Carole Howald	1	1	1
Stefanie Berset	1	1	
Philipp Hösli	1	1	
Yves Hess	1	1	
Kevin Wunderlin	1		3
Daniela Rupp	1		2
Flurina Kobler	1		
Marc Pfister	1		
Peter de Cruz		1	1
Mario Freiberger		1	1
Romano Meier		1	1
Melanie Barbezat		1	
Pablo Lachat		1	
Claudio Pätz		1	
Nadja Grunder			1
Peter Hartmann			1
Paddy Käser			1
Isabelle Maillard			1
Matthias Perret			1
Benoît Schwarz			1
Elena Stern			1
Silvana Tirinzoni			1
Laura Engler			1

== See also ==
- Swiss Men's Curling Championship
- Swiss Women's Curling Championship
- Swiss Mixed Curling Championship
- Swiss Junior Curling Championships
- Swiss Senior Curling Championships
- Swiss Wheelchair Curling Championship
- Swiss Junior Mixed Doubles Curling Championship
