= Oberstdorf International Mixed Doubles Cup =

World Curling Tour event

The Oberstdorf International Mixed Doubles Cup is an annual mixed doubles curling tournament on the ISS Mixed Doubles World Curling Tour. It is held annually in early September at the Eissportzentrum Oberstdorf in Oberstdorf, Germany.

The purse for the event is €3,530 and its event categorization is 300 (highest calibre is 1000).

The event has been held since 2017.

== Past champions ==
Year	Winning pair	Runner up pair	Third place	Fourth place	Purse (CAD)
2017	(Czech Republic) Zuzana Hájková / Tomáš Paul	(Switzerland) Daniela Rupp / Kevin Wunderlin	(Switzerland) Stephanie Wild / Daniel Gubler	(Switzerland) Nadja Grunder / Peter Hartmann	$4,099
2018	(Sweden) Johanna Heldin / Kristian Lindström	(Czech Republic) Zuzana Paulová / Tomáš Paul	(Czech Republic) Jana Naceradska / Radek Bohac	(Switzerland) Daniela Rupp / Kevin Wunderlin	$5,035
2019	(Germany) Lena Kapp / Marc Muskatewitz	(Switzerland) Daniela Rupp / Kevin Wunderlin	(Scotland) Gina Aitken / Scott Andrews	(Switzerland) Jenny Perret / Martin Rios	$5,150
2020	(Sweden) Almida de Val / Oskar Eriksson	(Czech Republic) Zuzana Paulová / Tomáš Paul	(Sweden) Johanna Heldin / Daniel Magnusson	(Sweden) Emma Sjödin / Niklas Edin	€ 3,530
2021	(Sweden) Johanna Heldin / Daniel Magnusson	(Poland) Adela Walczak / Andrzej Augustyniak	(Switzerland) Daniela Rupp / Kevin Wunderlin	(Poland) Zuzanna Rybicka / Bartosz Dzikowski	€ 3,500
