= Alina Pätz =

Swiss curler (born 1990)

- Curler
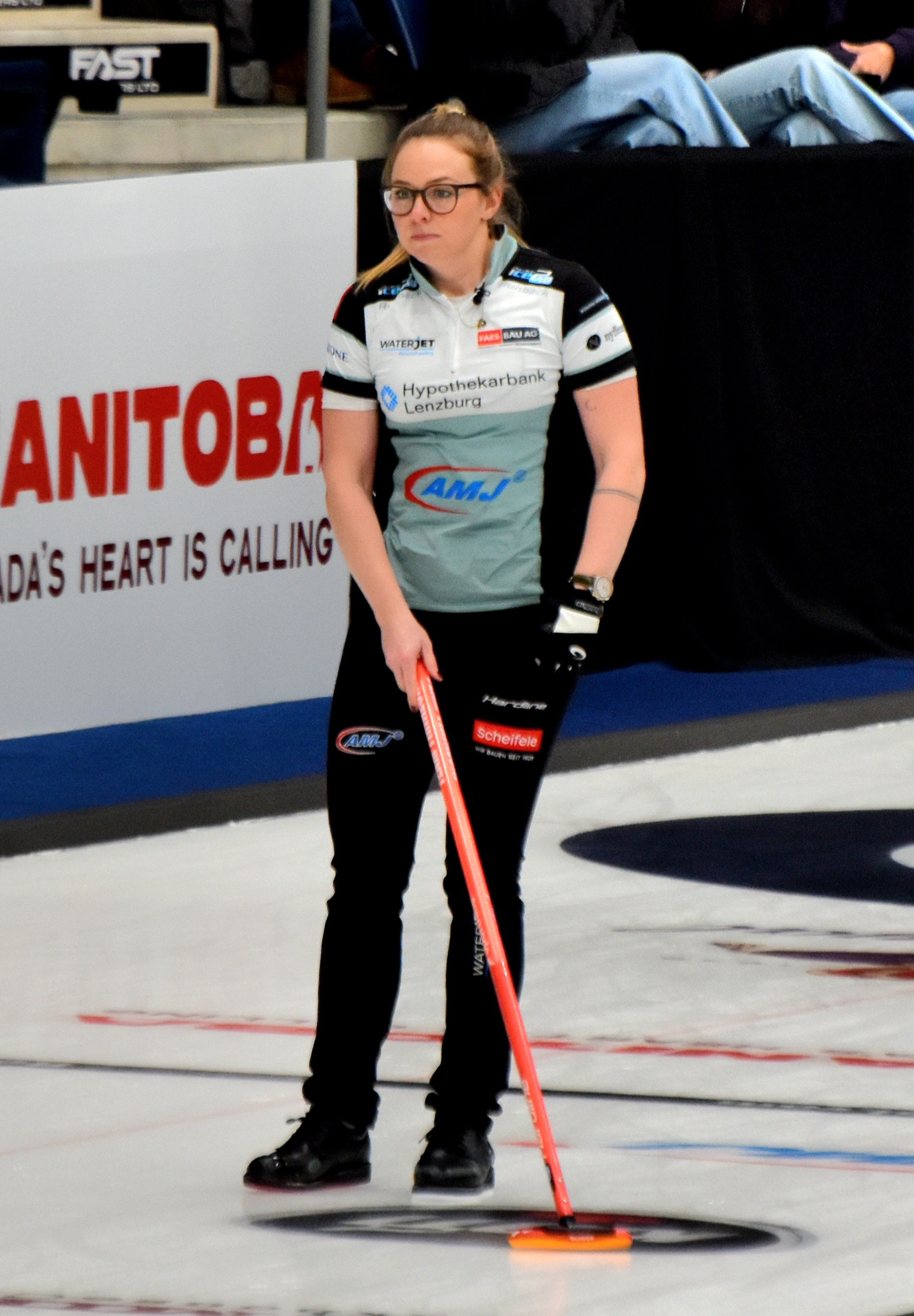
- Pätz at the 2026 Players' Championship
- Born: Alina Pätz; 8 March 1990 (age 36); Urdorf, Switzerland

Team
- Curling club: CC3C, Geneva, Switzerland
- Skip: Alina Pätz
- Third: Selina Witschonke
- Second: Stefanie Berset
- Lead: Renée Frigo
- Mixed doubles partner: Sven Michel

Curling career
- Member Association: Switzerland
- World Championship: 9 (2012, 2015, 2017, 2019, 2021, 2022, 2023, 2024, 2025)
- World Mixed Doubles Championship: 3 (2011, 2022, 2025)
- European Championship: 10 (2012, 2013, 2015, 2018, 2019, 2021, 2022, 2023, 2024, 2026)
- Olympic: 3 (2014, 2022, 2026)
- Grand Slam victories: 7 (2019 Champions Cup, 2022 National, 2024 Players', 2025 Players', 2025 Canadian Open, 2026 Players' (Jan.), 2026 National)
Medal record
Curling
Representing Switzerland
Olympic Games
Silver medal – second place	2026 Milano Cortina	Team
World Championships
Gold medal – first place	2012 Lethbridge
Gold medal – first place	2015 Sapporo
Gold medal – first place	2019 Silkeborg
Gold medal – first place	2021 Calgary
Gold medal – first place	2022 Prince George
Gold medal – first place	2023 Sandviken
Silver medal – second place	2024 Sydney
Silver medal – second place	2025 Uijeongbu
European Championships
Gold medal – first place	2023 Aberdeen
Gold medal – first place	2024 Lohja
Silver medal – second place	2018 Tallinn
Silver medal – second place	2022 Östersund
Silver medal – second place	2026 Ostrava
Bronze medal – third place	2013 Stavanger
Bronze medal – third place	2019 Helsingborg
World Mixed Doubles Championships
Gold medal – first place	2011 St. Paul
Silver medal – second place	2022 Geneva
European Mixed Championships
Silver medal – second place	2010 Howwood

Alina Pätz (born 8 March 1990 in Urdorf) is a Swiss curler from Matten bei Interlaken, Switzerland. She currently skips her own team. She won a silver medal at 2026 Winter Olympics as the fourth of the team skipped by Silvana Tirinzoni. Pätz has competed in nine World Women's Curling Championships, reaching the final eight times and winning six gold medals, tying her with Carole Howald for the curler with the most wins at the event. She also represented Switzerland at the Winter Olympics in 2014, 2022, and 2026. She is a two-time European champion, six-time Grand Slam champion, and the 2011 World Mixed Doubles champion.

== Career ==
=== Youth ===
Pätz first represented Switzerland internationally at the 2010 European Mixed Curling Championship, playing lead for her brother Claudio Pätz. The team, also including Gioia Öchsle and Sven Michel, finished 6–1 in the round robin to advance to the playoffs. They then won both their quarterfinal and semifinal matches before losing to hosts Scotland in the gold medal game. Later that season, her junior rink won the Swiss Junior Curling Championships, sending them to the 2011 World Junior Curling Championships. There, the team finished 5–4 in the round robin before dropping a tiebreaker to Sweden's Sara McManus.

=== Women's ===
In 2012, Pätz joined the Mirjam Ott rink as alternate for the 2012 World Women's Curling Championship, her first appearance at the event. After an 8–3 round robin record, they lost to Sweden in the 1 vs. 2 game but avenged this loss in the gold medal game to claim the world championship. She also served as Ott's alternate at the 2012 and 2013 European Curling Championships, winning bronze at the latter. Team Ott was selected to represent Switzerland at the 2014 Winter Olympics with Pätz making her Olympic debut. There, the team qualified for the playoffs as the third seed, however, lost both the semifinal and bronze medal game to finish fourth.

Following Ott's retirement in 2014, she began coaching Pätz' women's rink from Baden. The 2014–15 season was a breakthrough year for Pätz and teammates Nadine Lehmann, Marisa Winkelhausen and Nicole Schwägli. They won the 2014 Red Deer Curling Classic on the World Curling Tour, which was Pätz's first tour win. They also reached the final of the 2014 Stu Sells Oakville Tankard and the playoffs of the 2014 Masters and 2015 Players' Championship Grand Slam of Curling events. In the second half of the season, they won the International Bernese Ladies Cup and the Swiss Women's Curling Championship, qualifying them for the 2015 World Women's Curling Championship. Switzerland finished the round robin in first place with a 10–1 record. A victory over Canada's Jennifer Jones sent them to the final, where they once again faced Jones. Up 4–3 in the tenth end, Pätz drew to the button for the win, winning the World Championship gold medal and title.

The following season, Team Pätz won the right to represent Switzerland at the 2015 European Curling Championships, but they did not qualify for the playoffs, finishing 4–5. On tour, they did not win any events and only qualified at one of four Grand Slam events they played in, the 2015 Meridian Canadian Open. They were also unable to defend their title as world champions, losing in the Swiss championship to 2014 world champion Binia Feltscher. The 2016–17 season was more successful for the Swiss rink. They won the 2017 International Bernese Ladies Cup and made the final of the Glynhill Ladies International. They also won the Swiss championship and represented Switzerland at the 2017 World Women's Curling Championship. Despite starting 4–0, the team lost six of their last seven games, ultimately not qualifying for the playoffs. They ended their season by finishing second at the 2017 Euronics European Masters and making the semifinals of the 2017 Humpty's Champions Cup.

Team Pätz had several quarterfinal finishes during the 2017–18 season. They won the 2017 Stockholm Ladies Cup in October, defeating Kim Eun-jung in the final. The team then competed against the other top Swiss teams, Silvana Tirinzoni and Binia Feltscher, at the 2017 Swiss Olympic Curling Trials to choose the Swiss representative at the 2018 Winter Olympics. The event was ultimately won by the Tirinzoni rink, which finished 6–0. After failing to win the Swiss championship in February, the Pätz team disbanded.

Heading into the 2018–19 season, Pätz joined forces with Silvana Tirinzoni, who would skip the team, but Pätz would throw fourth rocks, with Esther Neuenschwander at second and Melanie Barbezat throwing lead rocks. In their first event, the team went undefeated at the Stu Sells Oakville Tankard until the final where they lost to Kerri Einarson. They also made the final in the first Grand Slam of the season, the Elite 10. In November 2018, they represented Switzerland at the 2018 European Curling Championships and claimed the silver medal. They were an unbeaten 9–0 in the round robin and defeated Germany 6–4 in the semifinal before losing 5–4 to Sweden's Anna Hasselborg in the final. They closed out the first half of the season with a semifinal finish at the 2018 National and an undefeated run at the Schweizer Cup. In the new year, Pätz reached her first Slam final at the 2019 Canadian Open, however, lost to Rachel Homan. After winning the 2019 Swiss National Championships, the team represented Switzerland at the 2019 World Women's Curling Championship in Silkeborg, Denmark. The team went 2–3 in their first five games, then won six games in a row to secure their playoff spot. They went on to finish the round robin with an 8–4 record and in fourth place in the standings. They defeated China in the qualification game and South Korea in the semifinal to set up a repeat of the European Championship final against Hasselborg and Sweden. This time, the result was reversed, with Pätz making a draw to the four-foot in the extra end for an 8–7 win to claim her third World Championship. The team capped off their year by winning their first Grand Slam title at the 2019 Champions Cup and reaching the final of the inaugural Curling World Cup.

At the start of the 2019–20 season, Team Tirinzoni were runners-up at the 2019 Cameron's Brewing Oakville Fall Classic. They also qualified for the playoffs at their next three events, the Stu Sells Oakville Tankard, the 2019 AMJ Campbell Shorty Jenkins Classic and the 2019 WCT Uiseong International Curling Cup. The next week, they won the Women's Masters Basel. They again represented Switzerland at the 2019 European Curling Championships, where they finished the round robin in first place with an 8–1 record. However, they would not make the final, as they lost to Scotland's Eve Muirhead in the semifinal. They rebounded in the bronze medal game, defeating Alina Kovaleva of Russia. The team would not get to defend their title as world champions, losing the final of the 2020 Swiss Women's Curling Championship to the young Elena Stern rink. The Swiss championship would be the team's last event of the season, as both the Players' Championship and the Champions Cup Grand Slam events were cancelled due to the COVID-19 pandemic.

Team Tirinzoni began the 2020–21 season by making the final of the 2020 Schweizer Cup, where they once again lost to the Stern rink. Three weeks later, the team was invited to play in the Adelboden International men's World Curling Tour event, as a last-minute addition. After dropping their first game to Yannick Schwaller, they went on a four-game winning streak against the men's field before losing to Olympic bronze medallist Peter de Cruz in the semifinal. In the new year, Pätz won her fourth national championship at the 2021 Swiss Women's Curling Championship. This put her team in a playoff against 2020 Champions Team Stern for the right to represent Switzerland at the 2021 World Women's Curling Championship, as the 2020 Worlds were cancelled due to the COVID-19 pandemic. Team Tirinzoni beat Stern in the playoff, and represented Switzerland at the World Championship, which was played in a bio-secure bubble in Calgary, Canada due to the pandemic. There, they finished with a 12–1 round robin record, including scoring a rare eight-ender against Denmark, the first time an eight-ender has ever been scored at a World Championship. In the playoffs, the team defeated the United States in the semifinal, and then Alina Kovaleva representing RCF (Russia) in the final to win the gold medal, successfully defending their 2019 championship. While also in the Calgary bubble, Team Tirinzoni played in two Grand Slam events, making the final at the 2021 Champions Cup and the semifinals at the 2021 Players' Championship.

Team Tirinzoni had a slow start to the 2021–22 season, not reaching any finals in their first five tour events. At the first two Slams, the 2021 Masters and the 2021 National, they went undefeated until losses in the quarterfinals and semifinals, respectively. At the 2021 European Curling Championships, the team failed to reach the playoffs for the first time, finishing in fifth with a 6–3 record. The next event the team played in was the 2022 Winter Olympics, where they found their footing for the first time during the season. They finished in first place after the preliminary round with an 8–1 round robin record. This earned them the top seed in the playoff round. They then, however, lost the semifinal to Japan's Satsuki Fujisawa and the bronze medal game to Sweden's Anna Hasselborg, placing fourth. Immediately after the Olympics, the team entered the Swiss Women's Curling Championship where they were once again able to defend their title, earning the right to represent Switzerland at the 2022 World Women's Curling Championship. At the championship, Team Tirinzoni dominated the competition, finishing the round robin with an unblemished 12–0 record. They then beat Sweden's Hasselborg in the semifinal to qualify once again for the world championship final where they would face South Korea's Kim Eun-jung. Switzerland took a three-point lead early, but Korea was able to tie the match later on. In the end, Pätz executed an open hit to win the match 7–6 and repeat for a third time as world women's curling champions. On 25 April the team announced that they would be splitting up at the end of the season, with front end Esther Neuenschwander and Melanie Barbezat stepping away from competitive curling. Team Tirinzoni ended their four-year run together with the final two Slam events of the season, the 2022 Players' Championship and the 2022 Champions Cup, where they had quarterfinal and semifinal finishes respectively. On 12 May Pätz and Tirinzoni announced that they would be staying together and adding Carole Howald and Briar Schwaller-Hürlimann to their team for the 2022–23 season.

The new Tirinzoni rink found immediate success on tour, going undefeated in their first event to win the Summer Series. The following week, they lost to Team Clancy Grandy in the final of the 2022 Martensville International. The team next competed in the 2022 Women's Masters Basel where they lost in the semifinal to Raphaela Keiser. They bounced back immediately the following week at the 2022 Stu Sells Toronto Tankard, again going undefeated to claim their second event title of the season. Team Tirinzoni continued their strong play into the first Slam event of the season, the 2022 National. After an undefeated round robin record, the team beat Jennifer Jones 7–3 in the quarterfinals, Kaitlyn Lawes 7–5 in the semifinals, and Kerri Einarson 7–3 in the championship game to win their third tour event and Pätz's second Grand Slam title. The team was back on the ice the following week at the 2022 Western Showdown where after dropping their first game, they won seven straight to claim another title. Team Tirinzoni's event streak came to an end at the 2022 Tour Challenge where after a 4–0 round robin record, they lost 9–2 in the quarterfinals to Isabella Wranå. Next for the team was the 2022 European Curling Championships where they finished third in the round robin with a 6–3 record. They then beat Italy's Stefania Constantini in the semifinal before dropping the championship game 8–4 to Denmark's Madeleine Dupont. After much success in the first half of the season, the team missed the playoffs at their next two events, the 2022 Masters and the 2023 Canadian Open. They rebounded, however, at the 2023 International Bernese Ladies Cup, going a perfect 8–0 to win the event. At the 2023 Swiss Women's Curling Championship, the team defended their title for a third year in a row, winning 6–4 over Corrie Hürlimann in the championship game. This qualified Team Tirinzoni for the 2023 World Women's Curling Championship where they continued their winning streak at the World Championship, again going 12–0 through the round robin. They then topped Sweden's Anna Hasselborg 8–4 to qualify for the final against Norway's Marianne Rørvik. Despite not having their best game, the Swiss team stole two in the tenth end to win the game 6–3 and secure their fourth consecutive World Championship title. With the win, the team also took the record for the most consecutive victories at the Women's World Championship, now at 36 games. Team Tirinzoni ended their season at the final two Slams of the season, the 2023 Players' Championship and the 2023 Champions Cup. At the Players', the team lost two straight before going on a six-game winning streak to qualify for the final. There, they lost 6–5 to Isabella Wranå. Prior to the Champions Cup, the team's last event of the season, they announced they had removed Briar Schwaller-Hürlimann from the team for "team harmony" reasons. The team made the decision while Schwaller-Hürlimann was playing in the 2023 World Mixed Doubles Curling Championship, but did not tell her until she travelled to Canada to play in the Champions Cup. Schwaller-Hürlimann was replaced by Rachel Erickson at the tournament, where they missed the playoffs with a 1–4 record. Days later, it was announced that Selina Witschonke was replacing Schwaller-Hürlimann on the team at second with Carole Howald shifting to lead.

To begin the 2023–24 season, Team Tirinzoni won 14 straight games in their first two events to claim the 2023 Women's Masters Basel and the 2023 AMJ Campbell Shorty Jenkins Classic, going an undefeated 7–0 at both. They then reached the quarterfinals of the 2023 Players Open where they lost to Kim Eun-jung. At the first Slam of the season, the 2023 Tour Challenge, the team had an undefeated record through the round robin before losing 7–4 in the quarterfinals to Jennifer Jones. They bounced back immediately with another undefeated run to win the Stu Sells 1824 Halifax Classic, their third title of the season. At the 2023 National, the team had another playoff appearance but lost in the semifinals to Korea's Gim Eun-ji. In November 2023, Team Tirinzoni won the gold medal at the 2023 European Curling Championships for the first time, finishing a perfect 11–0 through the event. In the final, they defeated Italy's Stefania Constantini 6–5 after a perfect hit-and-roll to the button on Pätz' final shot. They then lost in the quarterfinals of the 2023 Western Showdown to Isabella Wranå. At the next two Slams, the 2023 Masters and the 2024 Canadian Open, the team made two straight finals where they lost to Rachel Homan on both occasions. In the latter, they lost on an extra end steal after Pätz' draw went too far. They followed this with a quarterfinal finish at the 2024 International Bernese Ladies Cup, dropping a 4–3 decision to the Xenia Schwaller junior rink. Despite already being selected for the 2024 World Women's Curling Championship, Team Tirinzoni won their fourth straight Swiss Women's Championship in February by defeating Team Schwaller in the final. At the World Championship, the team won their first six games, extending their winning streak to 42 straight games. In the seventh game, however, they met Canada's Homan rink where they fell 8–5, ending their undefeated run. They finished the round robin in second place overall with a 10–2 record after another loss to Scotland's Rebecca Morrison. After beating Italy's Constantini in the semifinal, they faced off against Team Homan again in the final. After controlling most of the first half of the game, the Swiss rink led 5–4 in the ninth end. On her last rock, Homan made a split of a rock in the 12-foot to score three, giving the Canadians a 7–5 lead. Team Tirinzoni then conceded the game in the tenth after deciding they didn't have a shot to tie the game, ending their reign as world champions for the first time since 2019. They ended the season on a positive note, however, as at the 2024 Players' Championship they beat the Homan rink in the semifinals before defeating Team Wranå 6–5 in the final with Pätz claiming her third career Slam title.

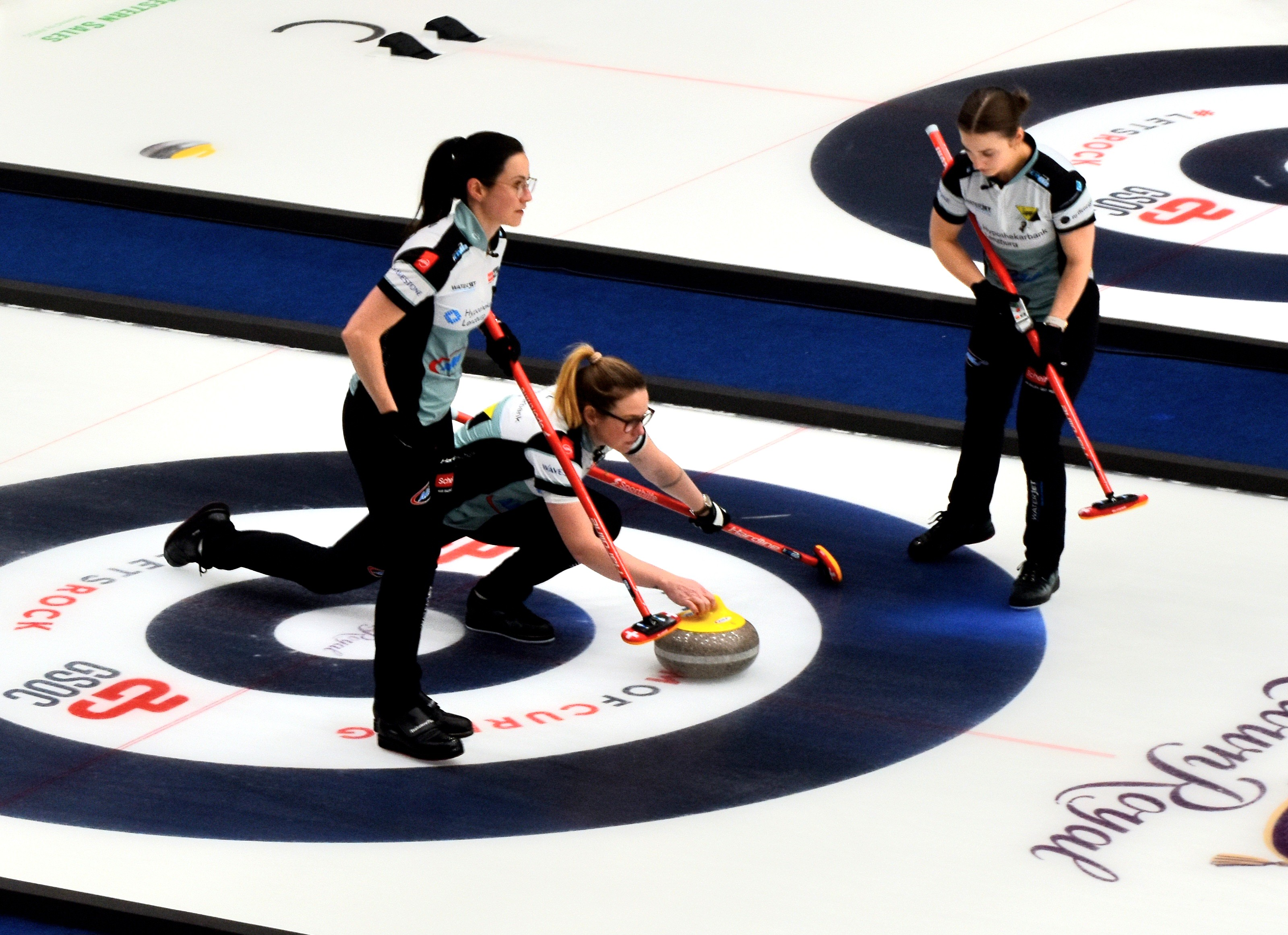
Pätz throws a rock in the 2026 Players' Championship in Steinbach, Manitoba.

Team Tirinzoni kicked off the 2024–25 season by finishing runner-up to Team Homan at the 2024 AMJ Campbell Shorty Jenkins Classic. They then played in the 2024 Women's Masters Basel where they defended their title, defeating Anna Hasselborg in the final. After failing to qualify at the 2024 Tour Challenge, they had an undefeated run at the 2024 Stu Sells Toronto Tankard up until the final where they lost to Kim Eun-jung. At the Swiss European Qualifier, they easily beat the Xenia Schwaller rink 4–0 in the best-of-seven series, securing their spot at the 2024 European Curling Championships. Before the Euros, they reached the final of the 2024 Canadian Open Slam, dropping a 7–5 decision to the Homan rink. They bounced back with a dominant performance at the Europeans, again winning all 11 of their games to secure the title. At the next two Slams, the 2024 National and the 2025 Masters, they lost in a tiebreaker and quarterfinal to Ha Seung-youn and Rachel Homan respectively. They rebounded again at the 2025 International Bernese Ladies Cup, however, claiming their third championship of the season. The following month, they went undefeated at the Swiss Championship until the playoffs where they lost both the 1 vs. 2 game and the semifinal. This third-place finish meant they would not qualify as the Swiss representatives for the 2025 European Curling Championships the following season, despite being two-time defending champions. Still, they represented the country at the 2025 World Women's Curling Championship where they went 11–1 in the round robin, only losing to Canada. After beating China's Wang Rui in the semifinal, they lost in the final for a second straight year to Team Homan, settling for silver. Despite losing the previous five meetings, Team Tirinzoni beat Team Homan 5–4 in the final of the 2025 Players' Championship to end the season.

=== Mixed doubles ===
While in juniors, Pätz represented Switzerland at the 2011 World Mixed Doubles Curling Championship with Sven Michel. There, the pair ran the table, winning all ten of their games to claim the title.

During the 2015–16 season, Pätz teamed up with her brother Claudio Pätz for the 2016 Swiss Mixed Doubles Curling Championship. The pair reached the final, however, were defeated by Flurina Kobler and Yves Hess. Her next appearance at the event was in 2020 where she reunited with Michel. The team dominated the round robin, winning all seven of their games to earn a bye to the semifinals. They then lost to eventual champions Jenny Perret and Martin Rios before claiming the bronze medal against Briar Hürlimann and Yannick Schwaller. The following year, at the 2021 Swiss Mixed Doubles Curling Championship, The pair finished the round robin with a 5–2 record, in second place. They then defeated teammate Silvana Tirinzoni and Benoît Schwarz in the semifinal before losing the best-of-three final to Hürlimann and Schwaller.

After falling in the playoffs the previous two years, Pätz and Michel went undefeated to win the Swiss title in 2022. At the 2022 World Mixed Doubles Curling Championship, the pair went 7–2 through the round robin and won a tight semifinal over Norway to reach the gold medal match. There, they fell 9–7 to Eve Muirhead and Bobby Lammie of Scotland, earning the silver medal. In 2023, they were unable to defend their title after losing to Hürlimann and Schwaller in the final.

Following a third-place finish in 2024, the team won the Swiss title again in 2025. This sent them to the 2025 World Mixed Doubles Curling Championship where they had mixed results, ultimately missing the playoffs with a 5–4 record.

== Personal life ==
Pätz is in a relationship with fellow curler Sven Michel. Her brother is Claudio Pätz, who won bronze at the 2018 Winter Olympics. She lives in Matten bei Interlaken. Pätz has a bachelor's degree in economics and a Masters in Sport Science. She is employed as an athlete manager. She began curling in 1997 at the age of 7.

== Grand Slam record ==
Key
C	Champion
F	Lost in Final
SF	Lost in Semifinal
QF	Lost in Quarterfinals
R16	Lost in the round of 16
Q	Did not advance to playoffs
T2	Played in Tier 2 event
DNP	Did not participate in event
N/A	Not a Grand Slam event that season

Event	2012–13	2013–14	2014–15	2015–16	2016–17	2017–18	2018–19	2019–20	2020–21	2021–22	2022–23	2023–24	2024–25	2025–26	2026–27
Invitational	N/A	N/A	N/A	Q	Q	QF	QF	QF	N/A	N/A	QF	QF	Q	F	QF
Masters	Q	DNP	QF	Q	Q	QF	Q	SF	N/A	QF	Q	F	QF	F	QF
National	N/A	N/A	N/A	DNP	DNP	QF	SF	Q	N/A	SF	C	SF	Q	F	C
Open	DNP	DNP	DNP	QF	DNP	Q	F	QF	N/A	N/A	Q	F	F	C	
Players'	DNP	DNP	QF	Q	DNP	DNP	Q	N/A	SF	QF	F	C	C	C	
Champions Cup	N/A	N/A	N/A	DNP	SF	Q	C	N/A	F	SF	Q	N/A	N/A	N/A	N/A

=== Former events ===
Event	2012–13	2013–14	2014–15	2015–16	2016–17	2017–18	2018–19
Elite 10	N/A	N/A	N/A	N/A	N/A	N/A	F
Colonial Square	Q	DNP	Q	N/A	N/A	N/A	N/A

== Teams ==
Season	Skip	Third	Second	Lead	Alternate
2006–07	Marlene Albrecht	Gioia Öschle	Bigna Öschle	Alina Pätz	
2007–08	Marlene Albrecht	Gioia Öschle	Bigna Öschle	Alina Pätz	
2010–11	Nicole Dünki	Alina Pätz	Gioia Öschle	Fabiola Duss	
2011–12	Manuela Siegrist	Alina Pätz	Claudia Hug	Nicole Dünki	
2012–13	Manuela Siegrist	Alina Pätz	Nadine Lehmann	Nicole Dünki	
2013–14	Alina Pätz	Nadine Lehmann	Nicole Schwägli	Nicole Dünki	
2014–15	Alina Pätz	Nadine Lehmann	Marisa Winkelhausen	Nicole Schwägli	Carole Howald (WCC)
2015–16	Alina Pätz	Nadine Lehmann	Marisa Winkelhausen	Nicole Schwägli	Elena Stern (ECC)
2016–17	Alina Pätz	Nadine Lehmann	Marisa Winkelhausen	Nicole Schwägli	Briar Hürlimann (WCC)
2017–18	Alina Pätz	Nadine Lehmann	Marisa Winkelhausen	Nicole Schwägli	
2018–19	Alina Pätz (Fourth)	Silvana Tirinzoni (Skip)	Esther Neuenschwander	Melanie Barbezat	Marisa Winkelhausen (ECC, WCC)
2019–20	Alina Pätz (Fourth)	Silvana Tirinzoni (Skip)	Esther Neuenschwander	Melanie Barbezat	
2020–21	Alina Pätz (Fourth)	Silvana Tirinzoni (Skip)	Esther Neuenschwander	Melanie Barbezat	Carole Howald (WCC)
2021–22	Alina Pätz (Fourth)	Silvana Tirinzoni (Skip)	Esther Neuenschwander	Melanie Barbezat	Carole Howald (ECC, OG, WCC)
2022–23	Alina Pätz (Fourth)	Silvana Tirinzoni (Skip)	Carole Howald	Briar Schwaller-Hürlimann	Anna Gut (ECC)
2023–24	Alina Pätz (Fourth)	Silvana Tirinzoni (Skip)	Selina Witschonke	Carole Howald	Stefanie Berset (ECC, WCC)
2024–25	Alina Pätz (Fourth)	Silvana Tirinzoni (Skip)	Carole Howald	Selina Witschonke	Stefanie Berset (ECC, WCC)
2025–26	Alina Pätz (Fourth)	Silvana Tirinzoni (Skip)	Carole Howald	Selina Witschonke	Stefanie Berset (OG)
2026–27	Alina Pätz	Selina Witschonke	Stefanie Berset	Renée Frigo	Nadine Bärtschiger (ECC)
