= 2021 Swiss Mixed Doubles Curling Championship =

Curling tournament edition

- Host city: Biel, Switzerland
- Arena: Curlinghalle AG Biel
- Dates: January 27–30
- Winner: (Canton of Solothurn) Hürlimann / Schwaller
- Female: Briar Hürlimann
- Male: Yannick Schwaller
- Finalist: (Aargau) Pätz / Michel

The 2021 Swiss Mixed Doubles Curling Championship was held from January 27 to 30, 2021 at the Curlinghalle AG Biel in Biel, Switzerland. The winning pair of Briar Hürlimann and Yannick Schwaller then played against the 2020 Swiss champions Jenny Perret and Martin Rios for the right represent Switzerland at the 2021 World Mixed Doubles Curling Championship.

The event was held in a round robin format between the eight competing teams. The top three teams then advanced to the playoffs where the second place team played the third place team in the semifinal. The winner of the semifinal then played the first place team in a best of three to determine the winner.

== Teams ==
The teams are listed as follows:

Team	Female	Male	Locale
Genève 1	Melanie Barbezat	Peter de Cruz	(Canton of Geneva) Geneva
Baden Regio	Lisa Gisler	Romano Meier	(Grand Duchy of Baden) Baden
Solothurn Regio	Briar Hürlimann	Yannick Schwaller	(Canton of Solothurn) Solothurn
Dübendorf	Esther Neuenschwander	Michael Brunner	(Canton of Zurich) Zürich
Aarau	Alina Pätz	Sven Michel	(Aargau) Aarau
Glarus	Jenny Perret	Martin Rios	(Canton of Glarus) Glarus
Zug	Daniela Rupp	Kevin Wunderlin	(Canton of Zug) Zug
Genève 2	Silvana Tirinzoni	Benoît Schwarz	(Canton of Geneva) Geneva

== Round robin standings ==
Final Round Robin Standings

Key
Teams to Playoffs

Team	W	L	W–L	DSC
(Canton of Solothurn) Hürlimann / Schwaller	6	1	–	24.15
(Aargau) Pätz / Michel	5	2	–	15.81
(Canton of Geneva) Tirinzoni / Schwarz	4	3	2–0	25.43
(Canton of Zurich) Neuenschwander / Brunner	4	3	1–1	26.28
(Canton of Glarus) Perret / Rios	4	3	0–2	25.48
(Grand Duchy of Baden) Gisler / Meier	3	4	–	29.80
(Canton of Geneva) Barbezat / de Cruz	2	5	–	16.60
(Canton of Zug) Rupp / Wunderlin	0	7	–	31.02

== Round robin results ==
All draw times are listed in Central European Time (UTC+01:00).

=== Draw 1 ===
Wednesday, January 27, 7:00 pm

Sheet 2	1	2	3	4	5	6	7	8	Final
(Canton of Zurich) Neuenschwander / Brunner	0	2	0	3	1	0	0	4	10
(Canton of Glarus) Perret / Rios 🔨	1	0	2	0	0	3	1	0	7

Sheet 3	1	2	3	4	5	6	7	8	Final
(Aargau) Pätz / Michel 🔨	2	0	2	0	1	0	2	0	7
(Grand Duchy of Baden) Gisler / Meier	0	4	0	2	0	1	0	1	8

Sheet 4	1	2	3	4	5	6	7	8	Final
(Canton of Geneva) Barbezat / de Cruz	0	3	0	2	0	1	0	2	8
(Canton of Geneva) Tirinzoni / Schwarz 🔨	2	0	1	0	1	0	3	0	7

Sheet 5	1	2	3	4	5	6	7	8	Final
(Canton of Solothurn) Hürlimann / Schwaller	0	2	0	2	0	1	1	0	6
(Canton of Zug) Rupp / Wunderlin 🔨	2	0	1	0	1	0	0	1	5

=== Draw 2 ===
Thursday, January 28, 9:00 am

Sheet 2	1	2	3	4	5	6	7	8	Final
(Canton of Geneva) Tirinzoni / Schwarz	0	3	0	0	0	4	0	X	7
(Aargau) Pätz / Michel 🔨	4	0	2	2	1	0	3	X	12

Sheet 3	1	2	3	4	5	6	7	8	9	Final
(Canton of Zug) Rupp / Wunderlin 🔨	0	1	1	1	0	2	1	0	0	6
(Canton of Zurich) Neuenschwander / Brunner	3	0	0	0	1	0	0	2	1	7

Sheet 4	1	2	3	4	5	6	7	8	Final
(Canton of Glarus) Perret / Rios 🔨	1	3	3	0	0	1	X	X	8
(Canton of Solothurn) Hürlimann / Schwaller	0	0	0	1	1	0	X	X	2

Sheet 5	1	2	3	4	5	6	7	8	Final
(Grand Duchy of Baden) Gisler / Meier	0	4	1	0	1	0	5	X	11
(Canton of Geneva) Barbezat / de Cruz 🔨	1	0	0	3	0	1	0	X	5

=== Draw 3 ===
Thursday, January 28, 2:00 pm

Sheet 2	1	2	3	4	5	6	7	8	Final
(Canton of Solothurn) Hürlimann / Schwaller	3	0	1	0	2	0	2	0	8
(Canton of Geneva) Barbezat / de Cruz 🔨	0	1	0	1	0	3	0	2	7

Sheet 3	1	2	3	4	5	6	7	8	Final
(Canton of Glarus) Perret / Rios 🔨	0	1	0	1	0	2	0	X	4
(Canton of Geneva) Tirinzoni / Schwarz	1	0	4	0	2	0	1	X	8

Sheet 4	1	2	3	4	5	6	7	8	Final
(Canton of Zug) Rupp / Wunderlin 🔨	0	0	1	0	0	3	1	0	5
(Grand Duchy of Baden) Gisler / Meier	3	1	0	1	1	0	0	2	8

Sheet 5	1	2	3	4	5	6	7	8	Final
(Canton of Zurich) Neuenschwander / Brunner	1	0	1	0	0	0	2	0	4
(Aargau) Pätz / Michel 🔨	0	2	0	1	1	1	0	1	6

=== Draw 4 ===
Thursday, January 28, 7:00 pm

Sheet 2	1	2	3	4	5	6	7	8	Final
(Grand Duchy of Baden) Gisler / Meier	1	0	4	0	0	1	0	0	6
(Canton of Geneva) Tirinzoni / Schwarz 🔨	0	2	0	1	1	0	2	1	7

Sheet 3	1	2	3	4	5	6	7	8	Final
(Canton of Solothurn) Hürlimann / Schwaller	0	2	0	3	0	1	0	1	7
(Canton of Zurich) Neuenschwander / Brunner 🔨	1	0	1	0	1	0	2	0	5

Sheet 4	1	2	3	4	5	6	7	8	Final
(Aargau) Pätz / Michel	0	2	0	2	1	0	2	0	7
(Canton of Geneva) Barbezat / de Cruz 🔨	1	0	2	0	0	1	0	1	5

Sheet 5	1	2	3	4	5	6	7	8	Final
(Canton of Zug) Rupp / Wunderlin 🔨	0	1	0	0	0	2	0	X	3
(Canton of Glarus) Perret / Rios	1	0	1	2	2	0	1	X	7

=== Draw 5 ===
Friday, January 29, 9:00 am

Sheet 2	1	2	3	4	5	6	7	8	Final
(Canton of Geneva) Barbezat / de Cruz 🔨	1	0	1	0	0	1	0	X	3
(Canton of Zurich) Neuenschwander / Brunner	0	2	0	1	2	0	2	X	7

Sheet 3	1	2	3	4	5	6	7	8	Final
(Grand Duchy of Baden) Gisler / Meier	0	2	1	0	0	0	1	0	4
(Canton of Glarus) Perret / Rios 🔨	1	0	0	2	1	1	0	1	6

Sheet 4	1	2	3	4	5	6	7	8	Final
(Canton of Geneva) Tirinzoni / Schwarz 🔨	1	1	1	0	1	1	0	1	6
(Canton of Zug) Rupp / Wunderlin	0	0	0	2	0	0	3	0	5

Sheet 5	1	2	3	4	5	6	7	8	Final
(Aargau) Pätz / Michel 🔨	1	0	1	0	1	0	1	0	4
(Canton of Solothurn) Hürlimann / Schwaller	0	2	0	2	0	1	0	1	6

=== Draw 6 ===
Friday, January 29, 2:00 pm

Sheet 2	1	2	3	4	5	6	7	8	Final
(Canton of Solothurn) Hürlimann / Schwaller 🔨	0	2	2	0	0	0	2	1	7
(Grand Duchy of Baden) Gisler / Meier	1	0	0	1	1	1	0	0	4

Sheet 3	1	2	3	4	5	6	7	8	Final
(Canton of Geneva) Barbezat / de Cruz 🔨	1	0	0	4	0	0	1	1	7
(Canton of Zug) Rupp / Wunderlin	0	2	1	0	2	1	0	0	6

Sheet 4	1	2	3	4	5	6	7	8	Final
(Aargau) Pätz / Michel 🔨	2	3	0	3	0	0	2	X	10
(Canton of Glarus) Perret / Rios	0	0	2	0	1	1	0	X	4

Sheet 5	1	2	3	4	5	6	7	8	Final
(Canton of Zurich) Neuenschwander / Brunner	0	0	0	0	2	0	X	X	2
(Canton of Geneva) Tirinzoni / Schwarz 🔨	1	3	2	3	0	1	X	X	10

=== Draw 7 ===
Friday, January 29, 7:00 pm

Sheet 2	1	2	3	4	5	6	7	8	Final
(Canton of Zug) Rupp / Wunderlin	0	1	0	3	1	0	0	0	5
(Aargau) Pätz / Michel 🔨	3	0	1	0	0	1	1	1	7

Sheet 3	1	2	3	4	5	6	7	8	Final
(Canton of Geneva) Tirinzoni / Schwarz 🔨	2	0	1	0	0	1	0	0	4
(Canton of Solothurn) Hürlimann / Schwaller	0	2	0	1	1	0	2	1	7

Sheet 4	1	2	3	4	5	6	7	8	Final
(Grand Duchy of Baden) Gisler / Meier 🔨	0	0	1	0	1	1	0	X	3
(Canton of Zurich) Neuenschwander / Brunner	1	2	0	2	0	0	1	X	6

Sheet 5	1	2	3	4	5	6	7	8	Final
(Canton of Glarus) Perret / Rios 🔨	0	1	0	1	0	1	0	3	6
(Canton of Geneva) Barbezat / de Cruz	1	0	2	0	1	0	1	0	5

== Semifinal ==
Saturday, January 30, 9:00 am

Sheet 3	1	2	3	4	5	6	7	8	9	Final
(Aargau) Pätz / Michel 🔨	0	0	1	0	0	1	1	1	1	5
(Canton of Geneva) Tirinzoni / Schwarz	1	1	0	1	1	0	0	0	0	4

== Championship Round ==
Best of three
1	(Canton of Solothurn) Hürlimann / Schwaller	6	8	X
2	(Aargau) Pätz / Michel	4	7	X

=== Game 1 ===
Saturday, January 30, 2:00 pm

Sheet 4	1	2	3	4	5	6	7	8	Final
(Canton of Solothurn) Hürlimann / Schwaller 🔨	1	0	1	1	0	0	0	3	6
(Aargau) Pätz / Michel	0	1	0	0	1	1	1	0	4

=== Game 2 ===
Saturday, January 30, 7:00 pm

Sheet 4	1	2	3	4	5	6	7	8	9	Final
(Canton of Solothurn) Hürlimann / Schwaller	0	2	0	2	1	0	2	0	1	8
(Aargau) Pätz / Michel 🔨	3	0	2	0	0	1	0	1	0	7
