= Yves Hess =

Swiss curler

- Curler

Team
- Curling club: Zug CC, Zug
- Mixed doubles partner: Flurina Kobler

Curling career
- Member Association: Switzerland
- World Mixed Doubles Championship: 1 (2016)
- Other appearances: Winter Universiade: 2 (2003, 2009)
Medal record
Curling
Representing Switzerland
World Mixed Curling Championship
Bronze medal – third place	2022 Aberdeen
Swiss Men's Championship
Silver medal – second place	2012 Gstaad
Bronze medal – third place	2018 Flims
Swiss Mixed Doubles Championship
Gold medal – first place	2016 Interlaken
Silver medal – second place	2015 Bern
Winter Universiade
Silver medal – second place	2003 Tarvisio

Yves Hess is a Swiss curler from Zug.

== Teams ==
=== Men's ===
Season	Skip	Third	Second	Lead	Alternate	Coach	Events
2002–03	Cyril Stutz	Urs Eichhorn	Christian Haller	Yves Hess	Reto Herger	Christian Albrecht	WUG 2003 (silver)
2004–05	Cyril Stutz	Yves Hess	Benno Arnold	Samuel Stutz			
2005–06	Cyril Stutz	Pascal Hess	Benno Arnold	Yves Hess			
2006–07	Pascal Hess	Yves Hess	Benno Arnold	Urs Kuhn			
2007–08	Pascal Hess	Yves Hess	Florian Zürrer	Stefan Schori			
2008–09	Pascal Hess	Yves Hess	Florian Zürrer	Felix Attinger	Florian Meister	Martin Zürrer	WUG 2009 (5th)
2009–10	Pascal Hess	Yves Hess	Urs Eichhorn	Florian Zürrer			
2009–10	Pascal Hess	Yves Hess	Urs Eichhorn	Stefan Schori	Florian Zürrer, Brian Gray	Brian Gray, Martin Zürrer	SMCC 2010 (5th)
2010–11	Pascal Hess	Yves Hess	Stefan Meienberg	Stefan Schori	Kevin Wunderlin	Stephan Keiser, Ivana Stadler, Martin Zürrer	SMCC 2011 (5th)
2011–12	Pascal Hess	Yves Hess	Florian Meister	Stefan Meienberg	Cyril Stutz, Kevin Wunderlin	Martin Zürrer	SMCC 2012 (silver)
2012–13	Pascal Hess	Yves Hess	Florian Meister	Stefan Meienberg			
2013–14	Bernhard Werthemann	Bastian Brun	Yves Hess	Paddy Käser			
2014–15	Christian Haller (fourth)	Yves Hess (skip)	Rainer Kobler	Fabian Schmid	Simon Gloor, Jan Hess	Ivana Stadler, Edi Hess	SMCC 2015 (4th)
2015–16	Christian Haller (fourth)	Yves Hess (skip)	Rainer Kobler	Fabian Schmid		Martin Zürrer, Edi Hess	SMCC 2016 (4th)
2016–17	Yves Hess	Rainer Kobler	Michael Müller	Fabian Schmid	Kevin Wunderlin, Martin Zürrer	Martin Zürrer	SMCC 2017 (6th)
2017–18	Yves Hess	Rainer Kobler	Michael Müller	Fabian Schmid	Kevin Wunderlin, Martin Zürrer	Martin Zürrer, Peter Studer	SMCC 2018 (bronze)
2018–19	Jan Hess	Simon Gloor	Simon Höhn	Reto Schönenberger	Yves Hess	Yves Hess, Annick Lusser Hess	SMCC 2019 (5th)
2019–20	Jan Hess	Simon Gloor	Simon Höhn	Reto Schönenberger	Yves Hess	Linda Moore	SMCC 2020 (5th)

=== Mixed ===
Season	Skip	Third	Second	Lead	Events
2011–12	Yves Hess	Christina Oestreich	Cyril Stutz	Jeanniene Probst	SMxCC 2012 (5th)
2019–20	Yves Hess (fourth)	Ursi Hegner (skip)	Michael Müller	Claudia Baumann	SMxCC 2020 (gold)
2021–22	Yves Hess (fourth)	Ursi Hegner (skip)	Simon Hoehn	Chantal Schmid	SMxCC 2022 (gold)
2022–23	Yves Hess (fourth)	Ursi Hegner (skip)	Simon Hoehn	Claudia Baumann	SMxCC 2020 (gold)

=== Mixed doubles ===
Season	Male	Female	Coach	Events
2014–15	Yves Hess	Michèle Jäggi		SMDCC 2015 (silver)
2015–16	Yves Hess	Flurina Kobler	Laurence Bidaud (WMDCC)	SMDCC 2016 (gold); WMDCC 2016 (28th)
2016–17	Yves Hess	Flurina Kobler	Peter Studer	SMDCC 2017 (6th)
