= 2022 Martensville International =

2022 Curling Stadium Martensville International
- Host city: Martensville, Saskatchewan
- Arena: Martensville Curling Club
- Dates: September 1–5
- Men's winner: (Switzerland) Team Schwaller
- Curling club: CC Genève, Geneva
- Skip: Yannick Schwaller
- Fourth: Benoît Schwarz
- Second: Sven Michel
- Lead: Pablo Lachat
- Finalist: (Japan) Riku Yanagisawa
- Women's winner: (British Columbia) Team Grandy
- Curling club: Vancouver CC, British Columbia
- Skip: Clancy Grandy
- Third: Kayla MacMillan
- Second: Lindsay Dubue
- Lead: Sarah Loken
- Finalist: (Switzerland) Silvana Tirinzoni

The 2022 Curling Stadium Martensville International was held from September 1 to 5 at the Martensville Curling Club in Martensville, Saskatchewan. The event was held in a round robin format with a purse of $22,250 on the men's side and $25,000 on the women's side.

The event was sponsored by Curling Stadium, a streaming service provided by CurlingZone. All of the games were streamed on CurlingZone YouTube page.

== Men ==
=== Teams ===
The teams are listed as follows:

Skip	Third	Second	Lead	Locale
Michael Brunner	Romano Meier	Anthony Petoud	Marcel Käufeler	Bern, Switzerland
John Epping	Mat Camm	Pat Janssen	Scott Chadwick	Toronto, Ontario
Colton Flasch	Catlin Schneider	Kevin Marsh	Dan Marsh	Saskatoon, Saskatchewan
Kody Hartung	Tyler Hartung	Brady Scharback	Brady Kendel	Saskatoon, Saskatchewan
Kyler Kleibrink	Dustin Kalthoff	Chris Kennedy	Evan van Amsterdam	Calgary, Alberta
Steve Laycock	Shaun Meachem	Chris Haichert	Brayden Stewart	Saskatoon, Saskatchewan
Mike McEwen	Ryan Fry	Jonathan Beuk	Brent Laing	Toronto, Ontario
Dallan Muyres	Garret Springer	Jordan Tardi	Dustin Mikush	Saskatoon, Saskatchewan
Benoît Schwarz (Fourth)	Yannick Schwaller (Skip)	Sven Michel	Pablo Lachat	Geneva, Switzerland
Riku Yanagisawa	Tsuyoshi Yamaguchi	Takeru Yamamoto	Satoshi Koizumi	Karuizawa, Japan

=== Round-robin standings ===
Final round-robin standings

Key
Teams to Playoffs

Pool A	W	L	PF	PA	SO
(Saskatchewan) Colton Flasch	5	0	30	7	1
(Switzerland) Yannick Schwaller	4	1	32	15	2
(Ontario) Mike McEwen	4	1	32	20	3
(Saskatchewan) Steve Laycock	4	1	33	24	9
(Saskatchewan) Dallan Muyres	1	4	18	29	8

Pool B	W	L	PF	PA	SO
(Japan) Riku Yanagisawa	3	2	20	23	4
(Ontario) John Epping	2	3	22	27	7
(Switzerland) Michael Brunner	1	4	17	27	5
(Alberta) Kyler Kleibrink	1	4	22	38	6
(Saskatchewan) Kody Hartung	0	5	14	30	10

=== Round-robin results ===
All draw times are listed in Central Time (UTC−06:00).

==== Draw 1 ====
Thursday, September 1, 5:00 pm

Sheet 2	1	2	3	4	5	6	7	8	Final
(Ontario) Mike McEwen 🔨	0	2	1	1	0	1	3	X	8
(Saskatchewan) Kody Hartung	0	0	0	0	2	0	0	X	2

Sheet 4	1	2	3	4	5	6	7	8	Final
(Ontario) John Epping	0	0	0	0	2	1	1	1	5
(Saskatchewan) Steve Laycock 🔨	1	0	0	2	0	0	0	0	3

==== Draw 2 ====
Thursday, September 1, 8:30 pm

Sheet 3	1	2	3	4	5	6	7	8	Final
(Saskatchewan) Colton Flasch 🔨	0	0	0	1	3	0	0	X	4
(Japan) Riku Yanagisawa	0	0	0	0	0	0	0	X	0

Sheet 4	1	2	3	4	5	6	7	8	Final
(Saskatchewan) Dallan Muyres 🔨	1	0	0	0	2	0	2	0	5
(Alberta) Kyler Kleibrink	0	1	1	2	0	1	0	2	7

==== Draw 3 ====
Friday, September 2, 9:00 am

Sheet 1	1	2	3	4	5	6	7	8	Final
(Switzerland) Yannick Schwaller	0	3	0	1	0	0	0	0	4
(Japan) Riku Yanagisawa 🔨	1	0	1	0	1	0	1	2	6

==== Draw 4 ====
Friday, September 2, 12:30 pm

Sheet 1	1	2	3	4	5	6	7	8	Final
(Saskatchewan) Kody Hartung 🔨	1	0	0	1	0	0	2	0	4
(Saskatchewan) Dallan Muyres	0	1	0	0	2	1	0	1	5

Sheet 2	1	2	3	4	5	6	7	8	Final
(Saskatchewan) Colton Flasch 🔨	1	1	0	2	0	2	2	X	8
(Alberta) Kyler Kleibrink	0	0	0	0	3	0	0	X	3

Sheet 4	1	2	3	4	5	6	7	8	Final
(Switzerland) Michael Brunner	0	1	0	2	0	1	0	0	4
(Ontario) Mike McEwen 🔨	1	0	1	0	1	0	2	1	6

==== Draw 5 ====
Friday, September 2, 5:00 pm

Sheet 3	1	2	3	4	5	6	7	8	Final
(Switzerland) Yannick Schwaller 🔨	1	0	1	0	7	X	X	X	9
(Ontario) John Epping	0	1	0	1	0	X	X	X	2

==== Draw 6 ====
Friday, September 2, 8:30 pm

Sheet 2	1	2	3	4	5	6	7	8	Final
(Ontario) Mike McEwen 🔨	0	2	0	0	0	0	1	0	3
(Japan) Riku Yanagisawa	0	0	1	0	0	1	0	2	4

Sheet 3	1	2	3	4	5	6	7	8	9	Final
(Saskatchewan) Steve Laycock 🔨	1	1	0	0	2	1	0	0	2	7
(Alberta) Kyler Kleibrink	0	0	1	2	0	0	1	1	0	5

==== Draw 7 ====
Saturday, September 3, 9:00 am

Sheet 2	1	2	3	4	5	6	7	8	Final
(Switzerland) Michael Brunner 🔨	0	1	1	1	0	2	0	X	5
(Saskatchewan) Dallan Muyres	0	0	0	0	1	0	1	X	2

==== Draw 8 ====
Saturday, September 3, 12:30 pm

Sheet 2	1	2	3	4	5	6	7	8	Final
(Switzerland) Yannick Schwaller 🔨	3	0	1	0	1	1	4	X	10
(Alberta) Kyler Kleibrink	0	2	0	1	0	0	0	X	3

Sheet 4	1	2	3	4	5	6	7	8	9	Final
(Ontario) Mike McEwen 🔨	0	1	0	1	1	0	3	0	1	7
(Ontario) John Epping	2	0	2	0	0	1	0	1	0	6

==== Draw 9 ====
Saturday, September 3, 5:00 pm

Sheet 3	1	2	3	4	5	6	7	8	Final
(Saskatchewan) Colton Flasch 🔨	2	2	3	X	X	X	X	X	7
(Switzerland) Michael Brunner	0	0	0	X	X	X	X	X	0

Sheet 4	1	2	3	4	5	6	7	8	Final
(Saskatchewan) Kody Hartung	0	3	1	0	0	0	0	X	4
(Saskatchewan) Steve Laycock 🔨	1	0	0	4	1	1	1	X	8

==== Draw 10 ====
Saturday, September 3, 8:30 pm

Sheet 4	1	2	3	4	5	6	7	8	Final
(Saskatchewan) Dallan Muyres 🔨	1	0	2	0	0	0	1	X	4
(Japan) Riku Yanagisawa	0	3	0	1	0	2	0	X	6

==== Draw 11 ====
Sunday, September 4, 9:00 am

Sheet 1	1	2	3	4	5	6	7	8	9	Final
(Switzerland) Michael Brunner	0	0	0	1	0	3	0	2	0	6
(Saskatchewan) Steve Laycock 🔨	2	1	1	0	1	0	1	0	1	7

Sheet 2	1	2	3	4	5	6	7	8	Final
(Saskatchewan) Kody Hartung	0	1	0	1	0	0	0	X	2
(Saskatchewan) Colton Flasch 🔨	1	0	1	0	2	1	0	X	5

Sheet 4	1	2	3	4	5	6	7	8	Final
(Ontario) John Epping	2	0	3	0	2	X	X	X	7
(Saskatchewan) Dallan Muyres 🔨	0	1	0	1	0	X	X	X	2

==== Draw 12 ====
Sunday, September 4, 12:30 pm

Sheet 1	1	2	3	4	5	6	7	8	Final
(Ontario) Mike McEwen 🔨	2	0	1	2	1	0	2	X	8
(Alberta) Kyler Kleibrink	0	3	0	0	0	1	0	X	4

Sheet 2	1	2	3	4	5	6	7	8	Final
(Switzerland) Michael Brunner 🔨	1	0	0	0	1	0	0	X	2
(Switzerland) Yannick Schwaller	0	2	0	1	0	1	1	X	5

==== Draw 13 ====
Sunday, September 4, 5:00 pm

Sheet 3	1	2	3	4	5	6	7	8	Final
(Saskatchewan) Colton Flasch 🔨	2	0	3	1	0	0	X	X	6
(Ontario) John Epping	0	1	0	0	0	1	X	X	2

==== Draw 14 ====
Sunday, September 4, 8:30 pm

Sheet 1	1	2	3	4	5	6	7	8	Final
(Saskatchewan) Steve Laycock 🔨	0	2	0	1	0	3	2	X	8
(Japan) Riku Yanagisawa	1	0	2	0	1	0	0	X	4

Sheet 4	1	2	3	4	5	6	7	8	Final
(Switzerland) Yannick Schwaller 🔨	0	2	0	0	0	2	0	X	4
(Saskatchewan) Kody Hartung	0	0	0	0	1	0	1	X	2

=== Playoffs ===
Quarterfinal
4	(Saskatchewan) Steve Laycock	4
5	(Japan) Riku Yanagisawa	6

Semifinals
1	(Saskatchewan) Colton Flasch	3
5	(Japan) Riku Yanagisawa	7
2	(Switzerland) Yannick Schwaller	9
3	(Ontario) Mike McEwen	2

Final
5	(Japan) Riku Yanagisawa	5
2	(Switzerland) Yannick Schwaller	6

==== Quarterfinal ====
Monday, September 5, 9:00 am

Sheet 1	1	2	3	4	5	6	7	8	Final
(Saskatchewan) Steve Laycock 🔨	0	0	1	0	2	0	1	0	4
(Japan) Riku Yanagisawa	0	0	0	1	0	4	0	1	6

==== Semifinals ====
Monday, September 5, 12:30 pm

Sheet 3	1	2	3	4	5	6	7	8	Final
(Saskatchewan) Colton Flasch 🔨	1	0	0	1	0	1	0	X	3
(Japan) Riku Yanagisawa	0	0	3	0	3	0	1	X	7

Sheet 4	1	2	3	4	5	6	7	8	Final
(Switzerland) Yannick Schwaller	2	0	0	2	5	X	X	X	9
(Ontario) Mike McEwen 🔨	0	0	2	0	0	X	X	X	2

==== Final ====
Monday, September 5, 4:00 pm

Sheet 2	1	2	3	4	5	6	7	8	9	Final
(Japan) Riku Yanagisawa	0	1	0	1	1	0	2	0	0	5
(Switzerland) Yannick Schwaller 🔨	2	0	1	0	0	2	0	0	1	6

== Women ==
=== Teams ===
The teams are listed as follows:

Skip	Third	Second	Lead	Alternate	Locale
Brett Barber	Krystal Englot	Kristin Ochitwa	Mackenzie Schwartz		Biggar, Saskatchewan
Chelsea Carey	Jamie Sinclair (Note: Jamie Sinclair spared for Liz Fyfe.)	Jolene Campbell	Rachel Erickson		Winnipeg, Manitoba
Gim Eun-ji	Kim Min-ji	Kim Su-ji	Seol Ye-eun	Seol Ye-ji	Uijeongbu, South Korea
Clancy Grandy	Kayla MacMillan	Lindsay Dubue	Sarah Loken		Vancouver, British Columbia
Ha Seung-youn	Kim Hye-rin	Yang Tae-i	Kim Su-jin		Chuncheon, South Korea
Ashley Howard	Cary-Anne McTaggart	Sara England	Shelby Brandt		Regina, Saskatchewan
Daniela Jentsch	Emira Abbes	Mia Höhne	Analena Jentsch		Füssen, Germany
Jennifer Jones	Karlee Burgess	Mackenzie Zacharias	Emily Zacharias	Lauren Lenentine	Winnipeg, Manitoba
Nancy Martin	Lindsay Bertsch	Jennifer Armstrong	Krysten Karwacki		Saskatoon, Saskatchewan
Larisa Murray (Fourth)	Lorraine Schneider (Skip)	Ashley Williamson	Amanda Kuzyk		Regina, Saskatchewan
Alina Pätz (Fourth)	Silvana Tirinzoni (Skip)	Carole Howald	Briar Schwaller-Hürlimann		Aarau, Switzerland
Kristy Watling	Hailey McFarlane	Laura Burtnyk (Note: Team Kristy Watling played with three players.)	–		Winnipeg, Manitoba

=== Round-robin standings ===
Final round-robin standings

Key
Teams to Playoffs

Pool A	W	L	PF	PA	SO
(Switzerland) Silvana Tirinzoni	4	1	33	16	3
(British Columbia) Clancy Grandy	4	1	29	23	7
(Manitoba) Jennifer Jones	3	2	38	20	9
(Germany) Daniela Jentsch	2	3	38	35	1
(Saskatchewan) Ashley Howard	2	3	18	37	12
(Saskatchewan) Lorraine Schneider	0	5	16	41	11

Pool B	W	L	PF	PA	SO
(South Korea) Gim Eun-ji	4	1	35	23	5
(Saskatchewan) Nancy Martin	4	1	35	18	8
(Manitoba) Chelsea Carey	3	2	28	30	6
(Manitoba) Kristy Watling	2	3	21	27	2
(South Korea) Ha Seung-youn	2	3	35	24	4
(Saskatchewan) Brett Barber	0	5	6	38	10

=== Round-robin results ===
All draw times are listed in Central Time (UTC−06:00).

==== Draw 1 ====
Thursday, September 1, 5:00 pm

Sheet 1	1	2	3	4	5	6	7	8	Final
(South Korea) Gim Eun-ji 🔨	0	0	2	0	1	2	0	2	7
(Saskatchewan) Nancy Martin	0	0	0	2	0	0	1	0	3

Sheet 3	1	2	3	4	5	6	7	8	Final
(British Columbia) Clancy Grandy	0	1	0	2	1	0	1	2	7
(Saskatchewan) Ashley Howard 🔨	1	0	2	0	0	1	0	0	4

==== Draw 2 ====
Thursday, September 1, 8:30 pm

Sheet 1	1	2	3	4	5	6	7	8	Final
(Manitoba) Chelsea Carey 🔨	1	1	1	0	0	2	2	X	7
(Saskatchewan) Brett Barber	0	0	0	1	1	0	0	X	2

Sheet 2	1	2	3	4	5	6	7	8	Final
(South Korea) Ha Seung-youn	0	1	1	0	0	1	2	0	5
(Saskatchewan) Nancy Martin 🔨	2	0	0	3	0	0	0	1	6

==== Draw 3 ====
Friday, September 2, 9:00 am

Sheet 2	1	2	3	4	5	6	7	8	Final
(Saskatchewan) Ashley Howard	0	0	0	0	X	X	X	X	0
(Switzerland) Silvana Tirinzoni 🔨	2	3	2	3	X	X	X	X	10

Sheet 3	1	2	3	4	5	6	7	8	Final
(Manitoba) Jennifer Jones 🔨	2	0	0	1	1	2	3	X	9
(Saskatchewan) Lorraine Schneider	0	1	0	0	0	0	0	X	1

Sheet 4	1	2	3	4	5	6	7	8	Final
(British Columbia) Clancy Grandy 🔨	0	2	0	0	3	0	2	1	8
(Germany) Daniela Jentsch	1	0	1	2	0	3	0	0	7

==== Draw 4 ====
Friday, September 2, 12:30 pm

Sheet 3	1	2	3	4	5	6	7	8	Final
(South Korea) Gim Eun-ji 🔨	0	0	0	1	0	4	2	X	7
(Manitoba) Kristy Watling	0	0	1	0	2	0	0	X	3

==== Draw 5 ====
Friday, September 2, 5:00 pm

Sheet 1	1	2	3	4	5	6	7	8	Final
(South Korea) Ha Seung-youn 🔨	2	0	3	1	2	X	X	X	8
(Manitoba) Kristy Watling	0	1	0	0	0	X	X	X	1

Sheet 2	1	2	3	4	5	6	7	8	Final
(Germany) Daniela Jentsch 🔨	0	3	0	4	2	0	4	X	13
(Saskatchewan) Lorraine Schneider	2	0	1	0	0	2	0	X	5

Sheet 4	1	2	3	4	5	6	7	8	Final
(Manitoba) Chelsea Carey 🔨	0	0	1	0	0	X	X	X	1
(Saskatchewan) Nancy Martin	2	4	0	1	5	X	X	X	12

==== Draw 6 ====
Friday, September 2, 8:30 pm

Sheet 1	1	2	3	4	5	6	7	8	Final
(Manitoba) Jennifer Jones 🔨	2	0	2	3	2	1	X	X	10
(Saskatchewan) Ashley Howard	0	1	0	0	0	0	X	X	1

Sheet 4	1	2	3	4	5	6	7	8	Final
(South Korea) Gim Eun-ji	0	0	2	1	0	4	X	X	7
(Saskatchewan) Brett Barber 🔨	0	1	0	0	1	0	X	X	2

==== Draw 7 ====
Saturday, September 3, 9:00 am

Sheet 1	1	2	3	4	5	6	7	8	9	Final
(Manitoba) Chelsea Carey	0	1	0	1	0	1	0	1	0	4
(Manitoba) Kristy Watling 🔨	1	0	1	0	1	0	1	0	1	5

Sheet 3	1	2	3	4	5	6	7	8	Final
(Germany) Daniela Jentsch 🔨	0	1	0	1	0	2	0	X	4
(Switzerland) Silvana Tirinzoni	1	0	3	0	2	0	1	X	7

==== Draw 8 ====
Saturday, September 3, 12:30 pm

Sheet 1	1	2	3	4	5	6	7	8	Final
(British Columbia) Clancy Grandy 🔨	1	1	0	1	0	1	0	1	5
(Switzerland) Silvana Tirinzoni	0	0	1	0	1	0	1	0	3

Sheet 3	1	2	3	4	5	6	7	8	Final
(Saskatchewan) Nancy Martin 🔨	2	1	1	0	2	1	X	X	7
(Saskatchewan) Brett Barber	0	0	0	1	0	0	X	X	1

==== Draw 9 ====
Saturday, September 3, 5:00 pm

Sheet 1	1	2	3	4	5	6	7	8	Final
(South Korea) Gim Eun-ji 🔨	1	0	3	2	0	0	3	X	9
(South Korea) Ha Seung-youn	0	3	0	0	2	2	0	X	7

Sheet 2	1	2	3	4	5	6	7	8	Final
(Germany) Daniela Jentsch 🔨	0	2	1	1	0	3	1	1	9
(Manitoba) Jennifer Jones	5	0	0	0	3	0	0	0	8

==== Draw 10 ====
Saturday, September 3, 8:30 pm

Sheet 1	1	2	3	4	5	6	7	8	Final
(Saskatchewan) Brett Barber	0	1	0	0	0	0	X	X	1
(Manitoba) Kristy Watling 🔨	3	0	2	1	1	1	X	X	8

Sheet 2	1	2	3	4	5	6	7	8	Final
(Saskatchewan) Ashley Howard	0	2	1	0	2	0	0	1	6
(Saskatchewan) Lorraine Schneider 🔨	1	0	0	1	0	2	1	0	5

Sheet 3	1	2	3	4	5	6	7	8	Final
(South Korea) Ha Seung-youn	1	0	0	2	0	0	3	0	6
(Manitoba) Chelsea Carey 🔨	0	2	2	0	1	1	0	2	8

==== Draw 11 ====
Sunday, September 4, 9:00 am

Sheet 3	1	2	3	4	5	6	7	8	Final
(Manitoba) Jennifer Jones	2	0	1	0	0	2	1	0	6
(Switzerland) Silvana Tirinzoni 🔨	0	2	0	2	1	0	0	1	7

==== Draw 12 ====
Sunday, September 4, 12:30 pm

Sheet 3	1	2	3	4	5	6	7	8	Final
(British Columbia) Clancy Grandy	0	0	4	0	0	3	0	X	7
(Saskatchewan) Lorraine Schneider 🔨	0	1	0	1	1	0	1	X	4

Sheet 4	1	2	3	4	5	6	7	8	Final
(Saskatchewan) Nancy Martin 🔨	0	0	2	0	3	0	1	1	7
(Manitoba) Kristy Watling	1	1	0	1	0	1	0	0	4

==== Draw 13 ====
Sunday, September 4, 5:00 pm

Sheet 1	1	2	3	4	5	6	7	8	Final
(Saskatchewan) Lorraine Schneider	0	0	0	1	0	0	X	X	1
(Switzerland) Silvana Tirinzoni 🔨	0	2	2	0	0	2	X	X	6

Sheet 2	1	2	3	4	5	6	7	8	Final
(Saskatchewan) Ashley Howard 🔨	1	1	0	2	0	2	0	1	7
(Germany) Daniela Jentsch	0	0	2	0	1	0	2	0	5

Sheet 4	1	2	3	4	5	6	7	8	Final
(South Korea) Ha Seung-youn 🔨	0	1	3	5	X	X	X	X	9
(Saskatchewan) Brett Barber	0	0	0	0	X	X	X	X	0

==== Draw 14 ====
Sunday, September 4, 8:30 pm

Sheet 2	1	2	3	4	5	6	7	8	Final
(British Columbia) Clancy Grandy 🔨	0	0	1	0	0	0	1	X	2
(Manitoba) Jennifer Jones	1	1	0	1	1	1	0	X	5

Sheet 3	1	2	3	4	5	6	7	8	Final
(Manitoba) Chelsea Carey 🔨	0	0	1	0	2	0	3	2	8
(South Korea) Gim Eun-ji	0	2	0	1	0	2	0	0	5

=== Playoffs ===
Quarterfinals
4	(Saskatchewan) Nancy Martin	4
5	(Manitoba) Chelsea Carey	7
3	(British Columbia) Clancy Grandy	7
6	(Manitoba) Jennifer Jones	5

Semifinals
1	(Switzerland) Silvana Tirinzoni	10
5	(Manitoba) Chelsea Carey	3
2	(South Korea) Gim Eun-ji	4
3	(British Columbia) Clancy Grandy	8

Final
1	(Switzerland) Silvana Tirinzoni	1
3	(British Columbia) Clancy Grandy	7

==== Quarterfinals ====
Monday, September 5, 9:00 am

Sheet 2	1	2	3	4	5	6	7	8	Final
(Saskatchewan) Nancy Martin 🔨	0	1	0	2	1	0	0	0	4
(Manitoba) Chelsea Carey	1	0	2	0	0	1	2	1	7

Sheet 3	1	2	3	4	5	6	7	8	Final
(British Columbia) Clancy Grandy 🔨	0	1	0	1	1	1	0	3	7
(Manitoba) Team Jones	1	0	2	0	0	0	2	0	5

==== Semifinals ====
Monday, September 5, 12:30 pm

Sheet 1	1	2	3	4	5	6	7	8	Final
(Switzerland) Silvana Tirinzoni 🔨	4	0	0	6	X	X	X	X	10
(Manitoba) Chelsea Carey	0	2	1	0	X	X	X	X	3

Sheet 2	1	2	3	4	5	6	7	8	Final
(South Korea) Gim Eun-ji 🔨	0	0	0	2	0	2	0	X	4
(British Columbia) Clancy Grandy	1	3	1	0	1	0	2	X	8

==== Final ====
Monday, September 5, 4:00 pm

Sheet 3	1	2	3	4	5	6	7	8	Final
(Switzerland) Silvana Tirinzoni	0	0	0	0	1	0	X	X	1
(British Columbia) Clancy Grandy 🔨	2	1	1	1	0	2	X	X	7
