= 2021 World Women's Curling Championship =

- Host city: Calgary, Alberta, Canada
- Arena: Markin MacPhail Centre, Canada Olympic Park
- Dates: 30 April–9 May 2021
- Attendance: 0 (behind closed doors)
- Winner: Switzerland
- Curling club: CC Aarau, Aarau & Bern CC, Bern
- Skip: Silvana Tirinzoni
- Fourth: Alina Pätz
- Second: Esther Neuenschwander
- Lead: Melanie Barbezat
- Alternate: Carole Howald
- Coach: Pierre Charette
- Finalist: RCF (Kovaleva)

The 2021 World Women's Curling Championship (branded as 2021 LGT World Women's Curling Championship for sponsorship reasons) was held 30 April to 9 May at the Markin MacPhail Centre at Canada Olympic Park in Calgary, Alberta.

The event was originally awarded to Schaffhausen, Switzerland. In February 2021 due to the COVID-19 pandemic, local authorities withdrew permission to host the event. On 5 March 2021, the championship was moved to Calgary. The event was held in a centralized "bubble" at Canada Olympic Park, which also hosted the men's world championship, as well as all major Curling Canada championships leading up to the Worlds. All events were held behind closed doors with no spectators.

Silvana Tirinzoni and her Swiss team defended their title, from 2019 since the 2020 Championship was cancelled, when they defeated Russian Alina Kovaleva (representative of the Russian Curling Federation) in the final, 4–2. During the round-robin against Denmark, the Swiss champions recorded the first eight-ender in World Curling Championship history. The United States, skipped by Tabitha Peterson won the bronze medal, defeating the defending Olympic champion Anna Hasselborg rink from Sweden 9–5 in the bronze medal game.

== Summary ==
The World Women's Curling Championship is the first event of the qualification process for curling at the 2022 Winter Olympics in Beijing; the National Olympic Committees representing the teams who finish in the top six will qualify directly to the Olympic tournament. The remaining teams that had qualified for the 2020 or 2021 World Women's Curling Championship, and have not yet qualified for the Olympics, will compete in the Olympic Qualification Event in December 2021 for the remaining three spots. If the team representing China (who already qualified as host nation) finishes in the top six, the sixth direct qualification spot from the world championship will be held over to the Olympic Qualification Event.

During Draw 9 on Sunday, 2 May, Team Switzerland, skipped by Silvana Tirinzoni, scored a rare eight-ender (in which all eight of the team's rocks ended up scoring) in the seventh end of their game against Denmark's Madeleine Dupont. Already sitting seven, Swiss fourth Alina Pätz just needed a draw to the full twelve–foot or better for the eighth point. Denmark immediately conceded, with the final score of the match being 13–4. It was the first eight-ender scored in World Curling Championships history (men or women).

Switzerland and RCF were the top two teams after the round robin, finishing with 12–1 and 11–2 records, respectively. After the round robin, Switzerland defeated the United States 7–3, and RCF defeated Sweden 8–7 to get to the final.

The United States, skipped by Tabitha Peterson won the bronze medal, defeating the defending Olympic champion Anna Hasselborg rink from Sweden 9–5 in the bronze medal game. The Americans took control of the game after scoring five points in the seventh end. It was the first medal for the U.S. since 2006.

Silvana Tirinzoni and her Swiss team defended their title, from 2019 since the 2020 Championship was cancelled, when they defeated Russian Alina Kovaleva (representative of the Russian Curling Federation) in the final, 4–2. In the final, RCF started the game off well without hammer, forcing Switzerland to a single point in the first end, as Switzerland faced two RCF rocks on their last stone, and chose a hit and stick to score one. After blanking the second end, Kovaleva missed a draw for two in the third end, settling for one point, and tying the game. Switzerland took a 3–1 lead in the fourth end after their last thrower, Alina Pätz made a double take-out for two points. RCF then blanked the next three ends, before being forced to a single point in the eighth, with Kovaleva making a tap-up against several Swiss rocks. Switzerland then blanked the ninth end to retain last rock advantage in the 10th and final end. They did not need to throw their last however, as Switzerland won the game after Kovaleva came up short on her final shot in the 10th end, a freeze attempt on a Swiss shot rock. Tirinzoni is only the fifth skip, and first Swiss, to win back-to-back Women's Championships. Switzerland has won six of the last nine Women's Championships. The cancelling of the 2020 World Championships allowed Team Tirinzoni to win back to back World Championships, as they had lost the 2020 Swiss Women's Curling Championship to Elena Stern, thus not qualifying for Worlds that year.

Switzerland's fourth stone thrower Alina Pätz won the Frances Brodie Award for sportsmanship.

== Impact of the COVID-19 pandemic ==
=== Re-location to Calgary ===
The event was originally scheduled to be held 20–28 March 2021 at the Curlinghalle Schaffhausen in Schaffhausen, Switzerland. On 8 February 2021 the World Curling Federation (WCF) announced that the tournament had been cancelled, as permission to host an international sporting event had been withdrawn by local health authorities due to concerns surrounding SARS-CoV-2 variants.

On 1 March 2021, it was reported that Curling Canada had made a proposal to re-locate the event to Calgary, Alberta, using the same "bubble" that has been established for the World Men's Championship and all other major national championships this season. On 5 March, the WCF officially announced that the World Women's Championship would be re-located to Calgary, and rescheduled to 30 April—9 May 2021.

=== Positive tests, suspension of television coverage ===
Prior to the competition, two members of the German team tested positive for COVID-19. The team was barred from the first day of practice, 28 April. On 29 April, the WCF announced that the three remaining players on the German team would be allowed to continue to represent their country as a three-player team.

On 2 May, several members of the host broadcast crew of the event tested positive for COVID-19, which resulted in the postponement of the morning draw in order to allow additional testing of players and staff. None of the players were among those who tested positive, while the broadcast staff had been based out of a different hotel than players. Play resumed with the afternoon session, but all television broadcasts from the tournament were suspended through at least the morning session on 7 May. The postponed matches were rescheduled to the evening session of 7 May. Due to further positive tests among members of the host broadcasting crew, World Curling extended the suspension of broadcasting through the afternoon of 7 May, with the hope that television broadcasting would resume in time for the playoff rounds. Television coverage ultimately resumed on the morning of May 7 with Alberta Health approving a proposal which minimal staff involvement for the remaining three days of the event.

== Qualification ==
14 curling federations qualified to participate in the 2021 World Women's Curling Championship. This was the first World Women's Championship appearance for Estonia, who was represented by skip Marie Turmann. Pursuant to a December 2020 ruling by the Court of Arbitration for Sport due to the Russian doping scandal, Russia is prohibited from competing under its flag or any national symbols at any Olympic Games or world championships through 16 December 2022, and therefore competed neutrally. The team is therefore representing the Russian Curling Federation (RCF).

Means of Qualification	Vacancies	Qualified
Planned Host Nation	1	Switzerland
Americas	2	Canada; United States
Europe	7	Sweden; Scotland; RCF; Germany; Czech Republic; Denmark; Estonia
Pacific-Asia	2	China; Japan
World Rankings	1	South Korea
2020 World Qualification Event	1	Italy
TOTAL	14	

=== World Ranking ===
The World Curling Federation World Ranking tracks and lists the success of all Member Associations.

Member Associations	Rank	Points
Sweden	1	81.569
South Korea	2	65.907
Canada	3	63.382
Switzerland	4	59.559
Japan	5	56.520
RCF	6	55.588
Scotland	7	50.098
United States	8	45.441
China	9	40.147
Denmark	10	27.059
Czech Republic	11	19.593
Germany	12	19.338
Italy	13	13.284
Estonia	19	8.863

== Teams ==
The teams were as follows:

Canada	China	Czech Republic	Denmark	Estonia
Gimli CC, Gimli Skip: Kerri Einarson; Third: Val Sweeting; Second: Shannon Birchard; Lead: Briane Meilleur; Alternate: Krysten Karwacki	CSO CC, Beijing & Harbin CC, Harbin Skip: Han Yu; Third: Dong Ziqi; Second: Zhang Lijun; Lead: Jiang Xindi; Alternate: Yan Hui	CC Sokol Liboc, Prague Skip: Anna Kubešková; Third: Alžběta Baudyšová; Second: Michaela Baudyšová; Lead: Ežen Kolčevská; Alternate: Petra Vinšová	Hvidovre CC, Hvidovre & Gentofte CC, Gentofte Skip: Madeleine Dupont; Third: Mathilde Halse; Second: Denise Dupont; Lead: Lina Knudsen; Alternate: My Larsen	Curling Tallinn, Tallinn Skip: Marie Turmann; Third: Liisa Turmann; Second: Heili Grossmann; Lead: Erika Tuvike; Alternate: Kerli Laidsalu
Germany	Italy	Japan	RCF	Scotland
CC Füssen, Füssen & 1.SCV Geising, Geising Skip: Daniela Jentsch; Third: Mia Höhne; ~~Second: Klara-Hermine Fomm~~ (Note: Fomm and Abbes are presumed to be the curlers who tested positive for COVID-19 and were therefore barred from participating); Lead: Analena Jentsch; ~~Alternate: Emira Abbes~~	Curling Pinerolo ASD, Pinerolo, ASD Milano CC, Milan, CC Dolomiti, Cortina d'Ampezzo & CC Lago Santo, Trento Skip: Stefania Constantini; Third: Marta Lo Deserto; Second: Angela Romei; Lead: Giulia Zardini Lacedelli; Alternate: Elena Dami	Sapporo CC, Sapporo Skip: Sayaka Yoshimura; Third: Kaho Onodera; Second: Anna Ohmiya; Lead: Yumie Funayama; Alternate: Ayami Ito	Adamant CC, Saint Petersburg Skip: Alina Kovaleva; Third: Yulia Portunova; Second: Galina Arsenkina; Lead: Ekaterina Kuzmina; Alternate: Maria Komarova	Dunkeld CC, Pitlochry, Balfron CC, Balfron, Carrington CC, Edinburgh & Leswalt CC, Leswalt Skip: Eve Muirhead; Third: Vicky Wright; Second: Jennifer Dodds; Lead: Lauren Gray; Alternate: Sophie Sinclair
South Korea	Sweden	Switzerland	United States	
Gangneung CC, Gangneung Skip: Kim Eun-jung; Third: Kim Kyeong-ae; Second: Kim Cho-hi; Lead: Kim Seon-yeong; Alternate: Kim Yeong-mi	Sundbybergs CK, Sundbyberg Skip: Anna Hasselborg; Third: Sara McManus; Second: Agnes Knochenhauer; Lead: Sofia Mabergs; Alternate: Johanna Heldin	CC Aarau, Aarau & Bern CC, Bern Fourth: Alina Pätz; Skip: Silvana Tirinzoni; Second: Esther Neuenschwander; Lead: Melanie Barbezat; Alternate: Carole Howald	St. Paul CC, St. Paul, Madison CC, Madison & Duluth CC, Duluth Skip: Tabitha Peterson; Third: Nina Roth; Second: Becca Hamilton; Lead: Tara Peterson; Alternate: Aileen Geving	

=== WCF ranking ===
Year to date World Curling Federation order of merit ranking for each team prior to the event. Rankings based on the 2019–20 season.

Nation (Skip)	Rank	Points
Sweden (Hasselborg)	1	467.461
Canada (Einarson)	2	420.070
Switzerland (Tirinzoni)	7	331.193
Scotland (Muirhead)	9	283.984
United States (Peterson)	10	245.428
RCF (Kovaleva)	12	237.658
South Korea (Kim)	14	216.662
Japan (Yoshimura)	15	202.510
China (Han)	26	149.539
Germany (Jentsch)	30	135.678
Italy (Constantini)	76	46.404
Czech Republic (Kubešková)	79	45.753
Estonia (Turmann)	98	32.190
Denmark (Dupont)	NR	0.000

== Round-robin standings ==
Key
Teams to Playoffs

Country	Skip	W	L	W–L	PF	PA	EW	EL	BE	SE	S%	DSC
Switzerland	Silvana Tirinzoni	12	1	–	112	56	54	41	10	12	87%	19.47
RCF	Alina Kovaleva	11	2	–	98	77	64	49	6	17	83%	24.88
Sweden	Anna Hasselborg	10	3	–	95	62	56	45	10	14	84%	42.86
Denmark	Madeleine Dupont	8	5	–	91	90	58	50	2	16	77%	48.31
United States	Tabitha Peterson	7	6	2–0	86	80	55	53	7	13	80%	38.40
Canada	Kerri Einarson	7	6	1–1	89	73	57	48	6	20	82%	39.50
South Korea	Kim Eun-jung	7	6	0–2	85	88	52	59	10	7	78%	24.18
Scotland	Eve Muirhead	6	7	1–1	88	89	62	55	4	16	81%	55.39
Germany	Daniela Jentsch	6	7	1–1	82	94	52	58	8	8	77%	58.78
China	Han Yu	6	7	1–1	68	79	44	54	4	6	79%	59.06
Japan	Sayaka Yoshimura	5	8	–	85	81	57	55	6	12	81%	51.74
Czech Republic	Anna Kubešková	3	10	–	57	97	40	60	6	6	75%	72.72
Italy	Stefania Constantini	2	11	–	70	100	52	54	6	13	74%	63.07
Estonia	Marie Turmann	1	12	–	71	111	46	68	7	6	71%	55.17

Round Robin Summary Table
Pos.	Country	Canada	China	Denmark	Denmark	Denmark	Germany	Italy	Japan		Scotland	South Korea	Sweden	Switzerland	United States	Record
6	Canada	—N/a	6–4	9–2	10–8	10–4	2–6	10–4	5–7	7–8	6–5	8–4	5–6	5–8	6–7	7–6
10	China	4–6	—	7–2	5–14	10–3	5–7	6–4	5–2	4–8	7–6	1–7	7–5	4–9	3–6	6–7
12	Czech Republic	2–9	2–7	—	5–6	8–7	8–9	7–5	2–9	7–5	5–6	4–7	3–7	1–9	3–11	3–10
4	Denmark	8–10	14–5	6–5	—	9–6	7–6	9–5	4–9	5–7	9–5	6–4	3–9	4–13	7–6	8–5
14	Estonia	4–10	3–10	7–8	6–9	—	11–9	5–11	6–9	6–8	5–8	6–8	4–7	5–9	3–5	1–12
9	Germany	6–2	7–5	9–8	6–7	9–11	—	6–10	7–6	4–8	6–7	10–9	1–6	3–8	8–7	6–7
13	Italy	4–10	4–6	5–7	5–9	11–5	10–6	—	2–8	5–8	6–9	6–7	5–9	2–9	5–7	2–11
11	Japan	7–5	2–5	9–2	9–4	9–6	6–7	8–2	—	5–6	5–10	8–9	5–7	5–10	7–8	5–8
2	RCF	8–7	8–4	5–7	7–5	8–6	8–4	8–5	6–5	—	9–8	8–7	10–8	6–8	7–3	11–2
8	Scotland	5–6	6–7	6–5	5–9	8–5	7–6	9–6	10–5	8–9	—	4–8	4–7	6–10	10–6	6–7
7	South Korea	4–8	7–1	7–4	4–6	8–6	9–10	7–6	9–8	7–8	8–4	—	8–6	2–10	5–11	7–6
3	Sweden	6–5	5–7	7–3	9–3	7–4	6–1	9–5	7–5	8–10	7–4	6–8	—	8–3	10–4	10–3
1	Switzerland	8–5	9–4	9–1	13–4	9–5	8–3	9–2	10–5	8–6	10–6	10–2	3–8	—	6–5	12–1
5	United States	7–6	6–3	11–3	6–7	5–3	7–8	7–5	8–7	3–7	6–10	11–5	4–10	5–6	—	7–6

== Round-robin results ==
All draw times are listed in Mountain Daylight Time (UTC−06:00).

=== Draw 1 ===
Friday, 30 April, 9:00 am

Sheet A	1	2	3	4	5	6	7	8	9	10	Final
Switzerland (Tirinzoni) 🔨	0	1	0	2	0	2	0	2	3	X	10
South Korea (Kim)	0	0	0	0	1	0	1	0	0	X	2

Sheet B	1	2	3	4	5	6	7	8	9	10	Final
Italy (Constantini)	0	1	0	1	0	1	0	1	1	0	5
Czech Republic (Kubešková) 🔨	1	0	2	0	1	0	2	0	0	1	7

Sheet C	1	2	3	4	5	6	7	8	9	10	Final
RCF (Kovaleva) 🔨	2	0	2	0	0	3	1	0	X	X	8
Germany (Jentsch)	0	1	0	2	0	0	0	1	X	X	4

Sheet D	1	2	3	4	5	6	7	8	9	10	Final
United States (Peterson) 🔨	2	0	1	0	1	0	1	0	1	0	6
Scotland (Muirhead)	0	1	0	2	0	2	0	2	0	3	10

=== Draw 2 ===
Friday, 30 April, 2:00 pm

Sheet A	1	2	3	4	5	6	7	8	9	10	Final
Denmark (Dupont) 🔨	0	1	0	1	0	1	0	1	0	X	4
Japan (Yoshimura)	1	0	1	0	4	0	1	0	2	X	9

Sheet B	1	2	3	4	5	6	7	8	9	10	Final
Canada (Einarson) 🔨	2	0	0	1	1	0	1	0	0	0	5
Sweden (Hasselborg)	0	1	0	0	0	2	0	1	1	1	6

Sheet C	1	2	3	4	5	6	7	8	9	10	Final
Estonia (Turmann)	0	1	0	0	1	0	1	0	X	X	3
China (Han) 🔨	2	0	3	0	0	3	0	2	X	X	10

Sheet D	1	2	3	4	5	6	7	8	9	10	Final
Italy (Constantini)	0	0	0	1	0	1	X	X	X	X	2
Switzerland (Tirinzoni) 🔨	0	3	1	0	5	0	X	X	X	X	9

=== Draw 3 ===
Friday, 30 April, 7:00 pm

Sheet A	1	2	3	4	5	6	7	8	9	10	Final
Germany (Jentsch) 🔨	0	0	2	2	1	0	1	0	2	0	8
United States (Peterson)	1	1	0	0	0	3	0	1	0	1	7

Sheet B	1	2	3	4	5	6	7	8	9	10	Final
Japan (Yoshimura)	0	1	1	0	0	2	0	1	0	X	5
Scotland (Muirhead) 🔨	1	0	0	2	2	0	2	0	3	X	10

Sheet C	1	2	3	4	5	6	7	8	9	10	Final
Canada (Einarson) 🔨	0	3	0	3	1	0	2	X	X	X	9
Czech Republic (Kubešková)	0	0	1	0	0	1	0	X	X	X	2

Sheet D	1	2	3	4	5	6	7	8	9	10	Final
South Korea (Kim)	0	2	0	0	2	0	1	0	2	0	7
RCF (Kovaleva) 🔨	1	0	1	1	0	1	0	1	0	3	8

=== Draw 4 ===
Saturday, 1 May, 9:00 am

Sheet A	1	2	3	4	5	6	7	8	9	10	Final
Sweden (Hasselborg) 🔨	1	0	1	0	1	0	2	0	2	X	7
Estonia (Turmann)	0	0	0	1	0	2	0	1	0	X	4

Sheet B	1	2	3	4	5	6	7	8	9	10	Final
China (Han)	0	0	4	0	0	1	0	X	X	X	5
Denmark (Dupont) 🔨	1	1	0	4	3	0	5	X	X	X	14

Sheet C	1	2	3	4	5	6	7	8	9	10	Final
United States (Peterson)	0	3	0	0	1	3	0	2	2	X	11
South Korea (Kim) 🔨	0	0	1	2	0	0	2	0	0	X	5

Sheet D	1	2	3	4	5	6	7	8	9	10	Final
Scotland (Muirhead)	0	2	1	2	0	0	0	1	0	1	7
Germany (Jentsch) 🔨	2	0	0	0	1	2	0	0	1	0	6

=== Draw 5 ===
Saturday, 1 May, 2:00 pm

Sheet A	1	2	3	4	5	6	7	8	9	10	Final
Canada (Einarson)	1	0	2	1	0	1	0	0	0	X	5
Switzerland (Tirinzoni) 🔨	0	2	0	0	1	0	0	3	2	X	8

Sheet B	1	2	3	4	5	6	7	8	9	10	Final
RCF (Kovaleva) 🔨	1	0	0	3	0	3	0	0	1	X	8
Italy (Constantini)	0	2	1	0	1	0	1	0	0	X	5

Sheet C	1	2	3	4	5	6	7	8	9	10	Final
Denmark (Dupont) 🔨	1	0	1	0	0	0	1	0	0	X	3
Sweden (Hasselborg)	0	3	0	0	1	1	0	0	4	X	9

Sheet D	1	2	3	4	5	6	7	8	9	10	Final
Czech Republic (Kubešková)	1	2	0	0	2	0	0	1	0	2	8
Estonia (Turmann) 🔨	0	0	1	2	0	1	1	0	2	0	7

=== Draw 6 ===
Saturday, 1 May, 7:00 pm

Sheet A	1	2	3	4	5	6	7	8	9	10	Final
Japan (Yoshimura)	0	0	1	0	0	1	0	0	0	X	2
China (Han) 🔨	1	0	0	0	2	0	0	1	1	X	5

Sheet B	1	2	3	4	5	6	7	8	9	10	Final
South Korea (Kim)	0	3	0	3	1	0	1	0	1	0	9
Germany (Jentsch) 🔨	3	0	1	0	0	2	0	3	0	1	10

Sheet C	1	2	3	4	5	6	7	8	9	10	Final
RCF (Kovaleva) 🔨	0	2	0	0	1	1	0	3	0	1	8
Canada (Einarson)	3	0	1	1	0	0	1	0	1	0	7

Sheet D	1	2	3	4	5	6	7	8	9	10	Final
United States (Peterson)	1	0	0	4	0	0	1	0	1	X	7
Italy (Constantini) 🔨	0	1	0	0	1	1	0	2	0	X	5

=== Draw 8 ===
Sunday, 2 May, 2:30 pm

Sheet A	1	2	3	4	5	6	7	8	9	10	Final
South Korea (Kim)	0	2	1	0	3	0	1	0	1	X	8
Scotland (Muirhead) 🔨	1	0	0	1	0	1	0	1	0	X	4

Sheet B	1	2	3	4	5	6	7	8	9	10	Final
United States (Peterson) 🔨	1	0	1	2	0	1	0	2	0	0	7
Canada (Einarson)	0	1	0	0	1	0	1	0	2	1	6

Sheet C	1	2	3	4	5	6	7	8	9	10	Final
Germany (Jentsch)	0	1	0	0	3	0	2	0	0	X	6
Italy (Constantini) 🔨	1	0	0	1	0	1	0	5	2	X	10

Sheet D	1	2	3	4	5	6	7	8	9	10	Final
Estonia (Turmann) 🔨	0	0	0	2	0	2	0	0	2	0	6
RCF (Kovaleva)	1	1	0	0	2	0	2	1	0	1	8

=== Draw 9 ===
Sunday, 2 May, 7:30 pm

Sheet A	1	2	3	4	5	6	7	8	9	10	Final
China (Han) 🔨	1	1	0	2	0	2	0	1	0	X	7
Sweden (Hasselborg)	0	0	1	0	1	0	1	0	2	X	5

Sheet B	1	2	3	4	5	6	7	8	9	10	Final
South Korea (Kim) 🔨	2	0	2	0	0	0	1	0	0	2	7
Italy (Constantini)	0	2	0	1	0	1	0	1	1	0	6

Sheet C	1	2	3	4	5	6	7	8	9	10	Final
Czech Republic (Kubešková)	0	1	0	0	1	0	0	X	X	X	2
Japan (Yoshimura) 🔨	1	0	1	4	0	2	1	X	X	X	9

Sheet D	1	2	3	4	5	6	7	8	9	10	Final
Switzerland (Tirinzoni) 🔨	2	0	0	2	1	0	8 (Note: First Eight-ender scored in World Curling Championships history.)	X	X	X	13
Denmark (Dupont)	0	1	1	0	0	2	0	X	X	X	4

=== Draw 10 ===
Monday, 3 May, 9:00 am

Sheet A	1	2	3	4	5	6	7	8	9	10	Final
Estonia (Turmann)	0	1	0	0	1	0	1	0	0	0	3
United States (Peterson) 🔨	1	0	0	1	0	1	0	1	0	1	5

Sheet B	1	2	3	4	5	6	7	8	9	10	Final
Switzerland (Tirinzoni) 🔨	1	0	2	2	0	1	1	0	3	X	10
Japan (Yoshimura)	0	2	0	0	1	0	0	2	0	X	5

Sheet C	1	2	3	4	5	6	7	8	9	10	Final
Sweden (Hasselborg) 🔨	0	0	0	1	0	2	0	3	1	X	7
Scotland (Muirhead)	0	0	1	0	2	0	1	0	0	X	4

Sheet D	1	2	3	4	5	6	7	8	9	10	Final
Germany (Jentsch) 🔨	0	0	1	0	0	2	0	1	2	X	6
Canada (Einarson)	0	0	0	1	0	0	1	0	0	X	2

=== Draw 11 ===
Monday, 3 May, 2:00 pm

Sheet A	1	2	3	4	5	6	7	8	9	10	Final
Italy (Constantini)	0	1	0	1	0	2	0	2	0	X	6
Scotland (Muirhead) 🔨	2	0	2	0	2	0	2	0	1	X	9

Sheet B	1	2	3	4	5	6	7	8	9	10	Final
Denmark (Dupont)	0	2	0	2	0	0	0	1	0	0	5
RCF (Kovaleva) 🔨	2	0	1	0	1	0	1	0	0	2	7

Sheet C	1	2	3	4	5	6	7	8	9	10	Final
Canada (Einarson) 🔨	1	0	0	2	0	1	1	2	1	X	8
South Korea (Kim)	0	2	0	0	2	0	0	0	0	X	4

Sheet D	1	2	3	4	5	6	7	8	9	10	Final
China (Han)	0	2	0	0	1	0	0	2	2	X	7
Czech Republic (Kubešková) 🔨	0	0	0	0	0	1	1	0	0	X	2

=== Draw 12 ===
Monday, 3 May, 7:00 pm

Sheet A	1	2	3	4	5	6	7	8	9	10	Final
Sweden (Hasselborg) 🔨	0	3	2	0	1	0	0	0	1	X	7
Czech Republic (Kubešková)	0	0	0	1	0	1	0	1	0	X	3

Sheet B	1	2	3	4	5	6	7	8	9	10	11	Final
Germany (Jentsch) 🔨	2	0	2	0	0	0	2	0	3	0	0	9
Estonia (Turmann)	0	2	0	2	0	2	0	1	0	2	2	11

Sheet C	1	2	3	4	5	6	7	8	9	10	Final
China (Han)	0	1	0	1	0	2	0	0	X	X	4
Switzerland (Tirinzoni) 🔨	1	0	2	0	3	0	2	1	X	X	9

Sheet D	1	2	3	4	5	6	7	8	9	10	Final
Denmark (Dupont)	0	0	1	0	2	0	2	0	1	1	7
United States (Peterson) 🔨	0	1	0	2	0	1	0	2	0	0	6

=== Draw 13 ===
Tuesday, 4 May, 9:30 am

Sheet A	1	2	3	4	5	6	7	8	9	10	Final
Estonia (Turmann)	0	2	0	1	0	1	0	2	0	X	6
South Korea (Kim) 🔨	1	0	3	0	2	0	2	0	0	X	8

Sheet B	1	2	3	4	5	6	7	8	9	10	Final
Italy (Constantini) 🔨	1	0	0	2	0	1	0	0	0	X	4
Canada (Einarson)	0	3	1	0	1	0	2	0	3	X	10

Sheet C	1	2	3	4	5	6	7	8	9	10	Final
Japan (Yoshimura) 🔨	1	0	0	0	1	0	1	0	2	0	5
RCF (Kovaleva)	0	1	1	0	0	1	0	1	0	2	6

Sheet D	1	2	3	4	5	6	7	8	9	10	Final
Switzerland (Tirinzoni)	0	0	1	0	0	2	0	0	X	X	3
Sweden (Hasselborg) 🔨	1	1	0	0	2	0	0	4	X	X	8

=== Draw 14 ===
Tuesday, 4 May, 2:30 pm

Sheet A	1	2	3	4	5	6	7	8	9	10	Final
Denmark (Dupont)	0	1	0	1	2	0	2	0	1	0	7
Germany (Jentsch) 🔨	1	0	1	0	0	1	0	2	0	1	6

Sheet B	1	2	3	4	5	6	7	8	9	10	11	Final
Japan (Yoshimura)	0	0	2	0	1	0	0	1	0	3	0	7
United States (Peterson) 🔨	0	1	0	1	0	2	2	0	1	0	1	8

Sheet C	1	2	3	4	5	6	7	8	9	10	Final
Scotland (Muirhead) 🔨	0	1	0	1	1	1	0	1	0	1	6
Czech Republic (Kubešková)	0	0	1	0	0	0	1	0	3	0	5

Sheet D	1	2	3	4	5	6	7	8	9	10	Final
RCF (Kovaleva) 🔨	1	1	0	2	0	1	0	2	1	X	8
China (Han)	0	0	1	0	1	0	2	0	0	X	4

=== Draw 15 ===
Tuesday, 4 May, 7:30 pm

Sheet A	1	2	3	4	5	6	7	8	9	10	11	Final
Scotland (Muirhead) 🔨	2	0	1	0	0	0	0	0	1	1	0	5
Canada (Einarson)	0	1	0	0	0	1	0	3	0	0	1	6

Sheet B	1	2	3	4	5	6	7	8	9	10	Final
Czech Republic (Kubešková)	0	0	0	0	0	1	X	X	X	X	1
Switzerland (Tirinzoni) 🔨	0	0	2	4	3	0	X	X	X	X	9

Sheet C	1	2	3	4	5	6	7	8	9	10	Final
China (Han)	0	1	0	0	0	0	1	0	1	X	3
United States (Peterson) 🔨	2	0	0	0	2	1	0	1	0	X	6

Sheet D	1	2	3	4	5	6	7	8	9	10	Final
Estonia (Turmann) 🔨	0	3	0	0	0	2	0	0	0	X	5
Italy (Constantini)	1	0	2	2	1	0	1	1	3	X	11

=== Draw 16 ===
Wednesday, 5 May, 9:00 am

Sheet A	1	2	3	4	5	6	7	8	9	10	Final
RCF (Kovaleva)	1	2	0	0	5	0	2	0	0	X	10
Sweden (Hasselborg) 🔨	0	0	2	1	0	4	0	1	0	X	8

Sheet B	1	2	3	4	5	6	7	8	9	10	Final
Estonia (Turmann)	0	0	1	2	0	0	0	1	0	X	4
Canada (Einarson) 🔨	2	0	0	0	1	1	2	0	4	X	10

Sheet C	1	2	3	4	5	6	7	8	9	10	11	12	Final
Japan (Yoshimura) 🔨	2	0	0	0	2	0	1	0	0	1	0	0	6
Germany (Jentsch)	0	1	0	0	0	1	0	2	2	0	0	1	7

Sheet D	1	2	3	4	5	6	7	8	9	10	Final
Denmark (Dupont)	0	0	0	1	0	2	1	0	2	0	6
South Korea (Kim) 🔨	0	0	1	0	1	0	0	1	0	1	4

=== Draw 17 ===
Wednesday, 5 May, 2:00 pm

Sheet A	1	2	3	4	5	6	7	8	9	10	11	Final
Japan (Yoshimura) 🔨	2	0	1	0	1	0	2	0	1	1	0	8
South Korea (Kim)	0	2	0	1	0	4	0	1	0	0	1	9

Sheet B	1	2	3	4	5	6	7	8	9	10	Final
United States (Peterson)	0	0	1	0	0	2	0	1	0	X	4
Sweden (Hasselborg) 🔨	0	2	0	3	1	0	2	0	2	X	10

Sheet C	1	2	3	4	5	6	7	8	9	10	Final
Czech Republic (Kubešková)	0	0	1	0	2	0	1	0	0	3	7
RCF (Kovaleva) 🔨	1	1	0	1	0	1	0	0	1	0	5

Sheet D	1	2	3	4	5	6	7	8	9	10	Final
Scotland (Muirhead)	0	0	1	0	2	0	1	1	1	0	6
Switzerland (Tirinzoni) 🔨	0	2	0	3	0	3	0	0	0	2	10

=== Draw 18 ===
Wednesday, 5 May, 7:00 pm

Sheet A	1	2	3	4	5	6	7	8	9	10	Final
Scotland (Muirhead)	1	1	0	1	1	0	1	2	0	1	8
Estonia (Turmann) 🔨	0	0	3	0	0	1	0	0	1	0	5

Sheet B	1	2	3	4	5	6	7	8	9	10	Final
Germany (Jentsch) 🔨	0	1	0	2	0	2	0	1	0	1	7
China (Han)	0	0	1	0	1	0	2	0	1	0	5

Sheet C	1	2	3	4	5	6	7	8	9	10	Final
Italy (Constantini)	0	0	2	0	3	0	0	0	0	X	5
Denmark (Dupont) 🔨	2	1	0	1	0	2	1	1	1	X	9

Sheet D	1	2	3	4	5	6	7	8	9	10	Final
Czech Republic (Kubešková) 🔨	0	0	2	0	0	1	0	X	X	X	3
United States (Peterson)	0	3	0	2	1	0	5	X	X	X	11

=== Draw 19 ===
Thursday, 6 May, 9:00 am

Sheet A	1	2	3	4	5	6	7	8	9	10	Final
Switzerland (Tirinzoni)	1	0	2	0	2	0	2	0	1	X	8
RCF (Kovaleva) 🔨	0	1	0	2	0	1	0	2	0	X	6

Sheet B	1	2	3	4	5	6	7	8	9	10	Final
Italy (Constantini) 🔨	0	1	0	1	0	0	0	0	0	X	2
Japan (Yoshimura)	0	0	2	0	1	1	2	0	2	X	8

Sheet C	1	2	3	4	5	6	7	8	9	10	Final
South Korea (Kim) 🔨	0	0	1	0	1	3	0	1	1	X	7
China (Han)	0	0	0	0	0	0	1	0	0	X	1

Sheet D	1	2	3	4	5	6	7	8	9	10	Final
Canada (Einarson)	0	5	0	1	1	0	0	2	1	X	10
Denmark (Dupont) 🔨	3	0	3	0	0	0	2	0	0	X	8

=== Draw 20 ===
Thursday, 6 May, 2:00 pm

Sheet A	1	2	3	4	5	6	7	8	9	10	Final
Canada (Einarson) 🔨	0	0	0	2	0	0	1	0	2	0	5
Japan (Yoshimura)	0	1	1	0	0	2	0	2	0	1	7

Sheet C	1	2	3	4	5	6	7	8	9	10	Final
United States (Peterson)	0	0	0	2	0	1	0	2	0	0	5
Switzerland (Tirinzoni) 🔨	0	0	2	0	1	0	2	0	0	1	6

Sheet D	1	2	3	4	5	6	7	8	9	10	Final
Germany (Jentsch)	0	0	0	1	0	0	0	0	X	X	1
Sweden (Hasselborg) 🔨	0	2	0	0	1	2	0	1	X	X	6

=== Draw 21 ===
Thursday, 6 May, 7:00 pm

Sheet A	1	2	3	4	5	6	7	8	9	10	Final
China (Han)	0	0	1	0	0	4	0	1	0	X	6
Italy (Constantini) 🔨	0	1	0	0	1	0	1	0	1	X	4

Sheet B	1	2	3	4	5	6	7	8	9	10	Final
Sweden (Hasselborg)	0	1	0	1	0	1	2	0	1	0	6
South Korea (Kim) 🔨	2	0	2	0	0	0	0	3	0	1	8

Sheet C	1	2	3	4	5	6	7	8	9	10	Final
Estonia (Turmann) 🔨	0	0	2	0	3	0	0	0	1	0	6
Denmark (Dupont)	1	1	0	2	0	1	0	3	0	1	9

Sheet D	1	2	3	4	5	6	7	8	9	10	Final
RCF (Kovaleva)	0	2	0	0	3	1	0	1	0	2	9
Scotland (Muirhead) 🔨	1	0	1	2	0	0	3	0	1	0	8

=== Draw 22 ===
Friday, 7 May, 9:00 am

Sheet A	1	2	3	4	5	6	7	8	9	10	Final
United States (Peterson)	0	2	0	0	0	0	0	1	0	X	3
RCF (Kovaleva) 🔨	3	0	1	1	0	1	1	0	0	X	7

Sheet B	1	2	3	4	5	6	7	8	9	10	Final
Denmark (Dupont) 🔨	0	3	1	0	0	2	0	2	1	X	9
Scotland (Muirhead)	1	0	0	1	1	0	2	0	0	X	5

Sheet C	1	2	3	4	5	6	7	8	9	10	Final
Germany (Jentsch)	0	2	1	4	0	1	1	0	0	0	9
Czech Republic (Kubešková) 🔨	1	0	0	0	2	0	0	2	1	2	8

Sheet D	1	2	3	4	5	6	7	8	9	10	Final
China (Han) 🔨	0	1	0	0	0	2	0	0	1	X	4
Canada (Einarson)	2	0	1	1	0	0	1	1	0	X	6

=== Draw 23 ===
Friday, 7 May, 2:00 pm

Sheet A	1	2	3	4	5	6	7	8	9	10	Final
South Korea (Kim) 🔨	0	2	0	1	1	0	2	0	1	X	7
Czech Republic (Kubešková)	0	0	1	0	0	1	0	2	0	X	4

Sheet B	1	2	3	4	5	6	7	8	9	10	Final
Switzerland (Tirinzoni) 🔨	3	0	2	0	0	2	0	1	X	X	8
Germany (Jentsch)	0	1	0	1	0	0	1	0	X	X	3

Sheet C	1	2	3	4	5	6	7	8	9	10	Final
Sweden (Hasselborg)	0	0	4	2	0	0	2	0	1	X	9
Italy (Constantini) 🔨	1	1	0	0	1	1	0	1	0	X	5

Sheet D	1	2	3	4	5	6	7	8	9	10	Final
Japan (Yoshimura)	0	0	1	0	2	0	2	0	3	1	9
Estonia (Turmann) 🔨	0	2	0	1	0	1	0	2	0	0	6

=== Draw 7 ===
Friday, 7 May, 7:00 pm – originally scheduled for Sunday, 2 May, 9:00 am.

Sheet A	1	2	3	4	5	6	7	8	9	10	Final
Czech Republic (Kubešková)	0	1	0	0	2	0	0	2	0	0	5
Denmark (Dupont) 🔨	1	0	1	0	0	1	0	0	2	1	6

Sheet B	1	2	3	4	5	6	7	8	9	10	Final
Scotland (Muirhead) 🔨	0	0	2	0	2	0	1	0	1	0	6
China (Han)	0	1	0	1	0	1	0	3	0	1	7

Sheet C	1	2	3	4	5	6	7	8	9	10	Final
Switzerland (Tirinzoni) 🔨	1	0	3	0	0	2	0	2	1	X	9
Estonia (Turmann)	0	1	0	2	1	0	1	0	0	X	5

Sheet D	1	2	3	4	5	6	7	8	9	10	Final
Sweden (Hasselborg)	0	1	0	2	0	0	3	0	0	1	7
Japan (Yoshimura) 🔨	1	0	1	0	0	1	0	1	1	0	5

== Playoffs ==
Qualification games
4	Denmark	7
5	United States	8
3	Sweden	8
6	Canada	3

Semifinals
1	Switzerland	7
5	United States	3
2	RCF	8
3	Sweden	7

Final
1	Switzerland	4
2	RCF	2
Bronze medal game
5	United States	9
3	Sweden	5

=== Qualification Games ===
Saturday, 8 May, 9:00 am

Sheet B	1	2	3	4	5	6	7	8	9	10	Final
Sweden (Hasselborg) 🔨	1	0	2	0	2	0	2	1	X	X	8
Canada (Einarson)	0	1	0	1	0	1	0	0	X	X	3

Player percentages
Sweden		Canada	
Sofia Mabergs	91%	Briane Meilleur	72%
Agnes Knochenhauer	92%	Shannon Birchard	83%
Sara McManus	91%	Val Sweeting	84%
Anna Hasselborg	92%	Kerri Einarson	81%
Total	91%	Total	80%

Sheet D	1	2	3	4	5	6	7	8	9	10	Final
Denmark (Dupont) 🔨	1	1	0	1	0	0	2	0	2	0	7
United States (Peterson)	0	0	1	0	0	3	0	3	0	1	8

Player percentages
Denmark		United States	
My Larsen	86%	Tara Peterson	91%
Denise Dupont	79%	Becca Hamilton	80%
Mathilde Halse	51%	Nina Roth	80%
Madeleine Dupont	78%	Tabitha Peterson	73%
Total	73%	Total	81%

=== Semifinal 1 ===
Saturday, 8 May, 3:00 pm

Sheet C	1	2	3	4	5	6	7	8	9	10	Final
Switzerland (Tirinzoni) 🔨	1	0	2	0	0	1	2	0	1	X	7
United States (Peterson)	0	1	0	1	0	0	0	1	0	X	3

Player percentages
Switzerland		United States	
Melanie Barbezat	85%	Tara Peterson	88%
Esther Neuenschwander	90%	Becca Hamilton	81%
Silvana Tirinzoni	79%	Nina Roth	85%
Alina Pätz	91%	Tabitha Peterson	68%
Total	86%	Total	80%

=== Semifinal 2 ===
Saturday, 8 May, 7:30 pm

Sheet C	1	2	3	4	5	6	7	8	9	10	Final
RCF (Kovaleva) 🔨	0	1	0	4	1	0	1	0	1	0	8
Sweden (Hasselborg)	0	0	1	0	0	3	0	2	0	1	7

Player percentages
RCF		Sweden	
Ekaterina Kuzmina	76%	Sofia Mabergs	86%
Galina Arsenkina	90%	Agnes Knochenhauer	69%
Yulia Portunova	89%	Sara McManus	75%
Alina Kovaleva	78%	Anna Hasselborg	73%
Total	83%	Total	76%

=== Bronze medal game ===
Sunday, 9 May, 8:30 am

Sheet C	1	2	3	4	5	6	7	8	9	10	Final
United States (Peterson)	0	0	0	1	1	0	5	0	2	X	9
Sweden (Hasselborg) 🔨	0	1	1	0	0	2	0	1	0	X	5

Player percentages
United States		Sweden	
Tara Peterson	94%	Sofia Mabergs	78%
Becca Hamilton	83%	Agnes Knochenhauer	83%
Nina Roth	90%	Sara McManus	79%
Tabitha Peterson	78%	Anna Hasselborg	72%
Total	86%	Total	78%

=== Final ===
Sunday, 9 May, 1:00 pm

Sheet C	1	2	3	4	5	6	7	8	9	10	Final
Switzerland (Tirinzoni) 🔨	1	0	0	2	0	0	0	0	0	1	4
RCF (Kovaleva)	0	0	1	0	0	0	0	1	0	0	2

Player percentages
Switzerland		RCF	
Melanie Barbezat	91%	Ekaterina Kuzmina	88%
Esther Neuenschwander	84%	Galina Arsenkina	85%
Silvana Tirinzoni	88%	Yulia Portunova	81%
Alina Pätz	79%	Alina Kovaleva	78%
Total	86%	Total	83%

== Statistics ==
=== Top 5 player percentages ===
Final Round Robin Percentages

Leads	%
(Switzerland) Melanie Barbezat	91.1
(Canada) Briane Meilleur	87.2
(Sweden) Sofia Mabergs	86.9
(United States) Tara Peterson	84.5
(Japan) Yumie Funayama	84.1
(Czech Republic) Ežen Kolčevská	84.1

Seconds	%
(Switzerland) Esther Neuenschwander	86.0
Galina Arsenkina	85.7
(Sweden) Agnes Knochenhauer	85.0
(Canada) Shannon Birchard	84.6
(United States) Becca Hamilton	80.2

Thirds	%
(Switzerland) Silvana Tirinzoni (Skip)	86.3
(Japan) Kaho Onodera	83.7
(Sweden) Sara McManus	81.9
Yulia Portunova	81.8
(Scotland) Vicky Wright	81.7

Skips	%
(Switzerland) Alina Pätz (Fourth)	84.9
(Sweden) Anna Hasselborg	81.1
Alina Kovaleva	80.4
(Scotland) Eve Muirhead	79.2
(United States) Tabitha Peterson	77.9

=== Perfect games ===
Minimum 10 shots thrown

Player	Team	Position	Shots	Opponent
Melanie Barbezat	Switzerland	Lead	12	Italy
Alina Pätz	Switzerland	Fourth	12	Czech Republic
Sofia Mabergs	Sweden	Lead	20	RCF
Anna Hasselborg	Sweden	Skip	16	Germany
