= Melanie Barbezat =

Swiss curler (born 1991)

- Curler
- Born: 10 August 1991 (age 35); Biel, Switzerland

Team
- Curling club: CC Aarau, Aarau, SUI

Curling career
- Member Association: Switzerland
- World Championship: 3 (2019, 2021, 2022)
- European Championship: 3 (2018, 2019, 2021)
- Olympic: 1 (2022)
- Grand Slam victories: 1 (2019 Champions Cup)
Medal record
Women's curling
Representing Switzerland
World Curling Championships
Gold medal – first place	2019 Silkeborg
Gold medal – first place	2021 Calgary
Gold medal – first place	2022 Prince George
European Championships
Silver medal – second place	2018 Tallinn
Bronze medal – third place	2019 Helsingborg
Winter Universiade
Bronze medal – third place	2013 Trentino

Melanie Barbezat (born 10 August 1991) is a Swiss retired curler from Zollikofen. From 2018 to 2022, she played lead for the Silvana Tirinzoni rink that won three consecutive World Women's Curling Championship titles in 2019, 2021 and 2022. The team also won the 2019 Champions Cup Grand Slam of Curling event, and competed at the 2022 Winter Olympics where they placed fourth.

== Career ==
Barbezat's first experience at a major international event came in 2012, when she won the right to represent Switzerland at the 2012 World Junior Curling Championships in Östersund, Sweden, an event which saw several future Olympic, World and European medallists appear, including Sara McManus, Lauren Gray, Anna Sidorova and Victoria Moiseeva. Barbezat's team finished the Round Robin with a 3–6 record, outside the playoff positions.

After her appearance at the World Junior Championships, Barbezat made a move to join Michèle Jäggi on the World Curling Tour playing lead. The team won the 2012 International ZO Women's Tournament, and finished runner-up to Silvana Tirinzoni at the 2013 Stockholm Ladies Cup.

Barbezat played second on the Swiss team at the 2013 Winter Universiade, skipped by Jäggi. After completing the Round Robin with a 7–2 record, finishing second in the table, the team were defeated by Kim Ji-sun in the semi-final, before winning the bronze medal with an 8–6 victory over Hannah Fleming.

After the 2013–14 season, Barbezat moved back to the skip position, with her team consisting of Daniela Rupp, future 2018 Olympic mixed doubles silver medallist Jenny Perret, and Carole Howald, an alternate for three consecutive World Championship winning teams. The team won two events on the tour, those coming at the 2014 Dumfries Curling Challenge and the 2016 International ZO Women's Tournament, Barbezat's second career victory there.

Prior to the 2018–19 season a major shake-up in Swiss curling saw Barbezat move back to the lead position to join Esther Neuenschwander, Tirinzoni and Alina Pätz in a team where three of the four members had just come from skipping their own teams. The team reached the final in the first Grand Slam of the season, the Elite 10. They represented Switzerland at the 2018 European Curling Championships claiming the silver medal, going on an unbeaten 9–0 run to finish top of the Round Robin, before defeating Germany 6–4 in the semifinal, and falling 5–4 to Sweden's Anna Hasselborg in the final. Having won the 2019 Swiss National Championships, the team represented Switzerland at the 2019 World Women's Curling Championship in Silkeborg, Denmark. The team got off to a shaky start posting a 2–3 record in their first five games before winning six in a row to secure their playoff spot, and, after a final round dead rubber loss, a round robin record of 8–4 and fourth place in the standings. Tight victories over China in the qualification game, and South Korea in the semifinal set up a repeat of the European Championship final against Hasselborg and Sweden. They were able to turn the tables on Sweden, with Pätz making a draw to the four-foot in the extra end for an 8–7 win which meant they were crowned the 2019 world champions. The team capped off their year with their first Grand Slam title together at the Champions Cup, and reaching the final of the inaugural Curling World Cup.

At the start of the 2019–20 season, Team Tirinzoni were runners-up at the 2019 Cameron's Brewing Oakville Fall Classic. They also qualified for the playoffs at their next three events, the 2019 Stu Sells Oakville Tankard, the 2019 AMJ Campbell Shorty Jenkins Classic and the 2019 WCT Uiseong International Curling Cup. The next week, they won the Women's Masters Basel. They represented Switzerland at the 2019 European Curling Championships where they finished the round robin in first place with an 8–1 record. However, they would not make the final, as they lost to Scotland's Eve Muirhead in the semifinal. They rebounded in the bronze medal game, defeating Alina Kovaleva of Russia. The team would not get to defend their title as world champions, losing the final of the 2020 Swiss Women's Curling Championship to the young Elena Stern rink. The Swiss championship would be the team's last event of the season, as both the Players' Championship and the Champions Cup Grand Slam events were cancelled due to the COVID-19 pandemic.

Team Tirinzoni began the 2020–21 season by making the final of the 2020 Schweizer Cup where they once again lost to the Stern rink. Three weeks later, the team was invited to play in the Adelboden International men's World Curling Tour event, as a last minute addition. After dropping their first game to Yannick Schwaller, they went on a four-game winning streak against the men's field before losing to Olympic bronze medallist Peter de Cruz in the semifinal. In January 2021, Barbezat competed at the 2021 Swiss Mixed Doubles Curling Championship with partner Peter de Cruz. The pair finished the round robin with a 2–5 record, failing to advance to the playoff round. Two weeks later, Team Tirinzoni won the 2021 Swiss Women's Curling Championship. This put them in a playoff against 2020 Champions Team Stern for the right to represent Switzerland at the 2021 World Women's Curling Championship, as the 2020 Worlds were cancelled due to the COVID-19 pandemic. Team Tirinzoni beat Stern in the playoff, and represented Switzerland at the World Championship, which was played in a bio-secure bubble in Calgary, Canada due to the pandemic. There, they finished with a 12–1 round robin record, including scoring a rare eight-ender against Denmark, the first time an eight-ender has ever been scored at a World Championship. In the playoffs, the team defeated the United States in the semifinal, and then Alina Kovaleva representing RCF (Russia) in the final to win the gold medal, successfully defending their 2019 championship. While also in the Calgary bubble, Team Tirinzoni played in two Grand Slam events, making the final at the 2021 Champions Cup and the semifinals at the 2021 Players' Championship.

Team Tirinzoni had a slow start to the 2021–22 season, not reaching any finals in their first five tour events. At the first two Slams, the 2021 Masters and the 2021 National, they went undefeated until losses in the quarterfinals and semifinals respectively. At the 2021 European Curling Championships, the team failed to reach the playoffs for the first time, finishing in fifth with a 6–3 record. The next event the team played in was the 2022 Winter Olympics, where they found their footing for the first time during the season. They finished in first place after the preliminary round with an 8–1 round robin record. This earned them the top seed in the playoff round. They then, however, lost the semifinal to Japan's Satsuki Fujisawa and the bronze medal game to Sweden's Anna Hasselborg, placing fourth. Immediately after the Olympics, the team entered the Swiss Women's Curling Championship where they were once again able to defend their title, earning the right to represent Switzerland at the 2022 World Women's Curling Championship. At the championship, Team Tirinzoni dominated the competition, finishing the round robin with an unblemished 12–0 record. They then beat Sweden's Hasselborg in the semifinal to qualify once again for the world championship final where they would face South Korea's Kim Eun-jung. Switzerland took a three-point lead early, but Korea were able to tie the match later on. In the end, Alina Pätz executed an open hit to win the match 7–6 and repeat for a third time as world women's curling champions. On 25 April the team announced that they would be splitting up at the end of the season, with Barbezat stepping away from competitive curling. Team Tirinzoni ended their four-year run together with the final two Slam events of the season, the 2022 Players' Championship and the 2022 Champions Cup, where they had quarterfinal and semifinal finishes respectively.

== Personal life ==
Barbezat is employed as a physiotherapist.

== Teams ==
Season	Skip	Third	Second	Lead
2010–11	Melanie Barbezat	Mara Gautschi	Michelle Gribi	Vera Campanovo
2011–12	Melanie Barbezat	Briar Hürlimann	Mara Gautschi	Janine Wyss
2012–13	Michèle Jäggi	Marisa Winkelhausen	Stéphanie Jäggi	Melanie Barbezat
2013–14	Michèle Jäggi	Marisa Winkelhausen	Stéphanie Jäggi	Melanie Barbezat
2014–15	Melanie Barbezat	Carole Howald	Jenny Perret	Daniela Rupp
2015–16	Melanie Barbezat	Carole Howald	Jenny Perret	Daniela Rupp
2016–17	Melanie Barbezat	Jenny Perret	Carole Howald	Daniela Rupp
2018–19	Alina Pätz (Fourth)	Silvana Tirinzoni (Skip)	Esther Neuenschwander	Melanie Barbezat
2019–20	Alina Pätz (Fourth)	Silvana Tirinzoni (Skip)	Esther Neuenschwander	Melanie Barbezat
2020–21	Alina Pätz (Fourth)	Silvana Tirinzoni (Skip)	Esther Neuenschwander	Melanie Barbezat
2021–22	Alina Pätz (Fourth)	Silvana Tirinzoni (Skip)	Esther Neuenschwander	Melanie Barbezat
