= Eight-ender =

Perfect score within a single end of curling

Curling
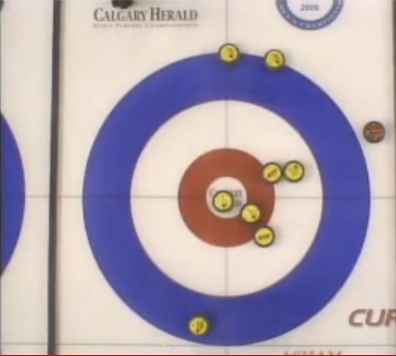
- Final stone placement when Kelly Scott scored an eight-ender against Cathy King at the 2006 Player's Championship

An eight-ender is a perfect score within a single end of curling, with one team scoring the maximum possible value of eight points—one for each rock the team put in play during the end.

An eight-ender is analogous to a perfect game in baseball, a perfect game in bowling (300) or a nine-dart finish in darts. Such a feat is extremely unusual at any level. To score an eight-ender almost always requires employment of an unusually aggressive strategy (in particular, eschewing the placement of guards, which usually do not score, especially with the early stones of an end) in addition to some combination of mistake-free play, poor play from the opposing team and good luck.

Eight-enders are even more rare in competitive curling. They are so uncommon that the Canadian Curling Association has an award to recognize any eight-ender scored in Canada. The eight-ender in team curling is analogous to the six-ender in mixed doubles curling, as there is a total of six rocks in play per team instead of eight.

There has never been an eight-ender in Olympic competition, the closest being a 'seven-ender' scored by Great Britain's Eve Muirhead at the 2014 Winter Olympics, in a 12–3 round-robin stage victory over the United States. In mixed doubles curling, the maximum score of six has been achieved at the Olympics, with Switzerland's Jenny Perret and Martin Rios doing so against the United States in the last end of their 9–4 round-robin win at the 2018 Winter Olympics. Eight-enders have never been scored at the Brier or Tournament of Hearts. The only eight-ender during the World Curling Championships was accomplished by Switzerland during the 2021 World Women's Curling Championship.

== Occurrences ==
=== Saskatchewan vs Quebec ===
At the 1952 Canadian Schoolboys Championship (now called the Canadian Junior Curling Championships), Saskatchewan's Gary Thode rink scored an eight-ender in the fifth end against Quebec (skipped by Gilles St. Hilaire) to take a 14–2 lead. To score eight, a nervous Thode had to hit and stick a Quebec stone in the back 12. In those days, it was not the custom for teams to concede early (even after the winner was conclusively determined) so they continued to play all 10 ends with Saskatchewan going on to win the match 17–5. To date, it has been the only eight-ender in Canadian juniors history. Saskatchewan went on to win the tournament.

=== Williamson vs. McMurray ===
At the 1958 New Brunswick Ladies Curling Championship, Margaret Williamson's rink (skipped by third-thrower Mary McMurray) from Bathurst, New Brunswick, scored an eight-ender in the tenth and final end in their final match of the tournament against Karen Jorgenson's team from Dalhousie. The Bathurst rink, which had been trailing 10–7 heading into the final frame, won the game 15–10, and the provincial championship.

=== Wilmette, Illinois, vs. Virginia, Minnesota ===
At the 1973 United States Women's Curling Association bonspiel (a forerunner to the United States Women's Curling Championship) in Appleton, Wisconsin, the Wilmette, Illinois, rink skipped by defending champion and former Canadian champion Betty Duguid scored an eight-ender in their game against a rink from Virginia, Minnesota. The Wilmette team won the game 12–6. It was the first time an eight-ender had been recorded at the event.

=== Consecutive eight-enders ===
In 1993, the team of Kim Gellard, Corie Beveridge, Lisa Savage, and Sandy Graham recorded two consecutive eight-enders.

=== Scott vs King ===
An eight-ender occurred at the 2006 Players' Championships in Calgary, Alberta, on April 15, 2006. The tournament was the final Grand Slam event in the 2005-06 Grand Slam of Curling and had a CA$100,000 purse – one of the largest in women's curling.

The match was between Kelly Scott, who at the time was the reigning Canadian women's champion and went on to become a world champion, and Cathy King, a former world bronze medallist. In the 6th end of their match, King and her rink played rather poorly, while Scott and her rink capitalized on King's mistakes. King ricocheted her final stone out the side of a crowded house, leaving Scott a draw for 8. Although her shot was heavy, Scott's rock came to a stop 18 inches (460 mm) from the back of the house, enough to score her eighth point.

=== Leskiw vs Hamblin ===
Another notable eight-ender occurred on January 22, 2011, at the MCA Bonspiel, the world's largest bonspiel. In this match Leskiw stole his eight points. When the team that does not have last rock in the end scores, the points scored are termed as stolen points. In this game, Leskiw managed an eight-ender even though Hamblin had the last rock, which gave him the opportunity to score or prevent Leskiw from scoring eight. In fact, Hamblin knocked Leskiw's eighth rock into the house with his final shot, turning a seven-point end into an eight-ender.

=== Jacobs vs. Phillips ===
2014 Olympic champion Brad Jacobs scored an eight-ender in the sixth end of the semi-final of The Dominion 2012 Northern Ontario Men's Curling Championship against Tim Phillips in Sault Ste. Marie, Ontario. Jacobs had been leading 6–3 at the time, and had the hammer. After allowing the eight points, the Phillips rink conceded the game. On his last rock, Phillips ricocheted off two Jacobs stones, and out the rings, exposing one of his rocks that had been buried. Jacobs still had to make a delicate hit to ensure the Philips stone was removed, and he had to stick it to score his eight, which he did.

=== Einarson vs. McLean ===
Winnipeg's Kerri Einarson scored an eight-ender in the seventh end of her first round-robin game at the 2015 Manitoba Scotties Tournament of Hearts against Tiffany McLean of Brandon in Winkler on January 21, 2015. Einarson's rink stole the eight points, after having scored five points the previous end. Einarson won the game by a total score of 16–3. The feat was the first time an eight-ender was scored at the Manitoba Scotties.

=== Australia vs. Hong Kong ===
The Australian men's team (skipped by Ian Palangio) scored an eight-ender in the first end of their match against Hong Kong (John Li) at the 2015 Pacific-Asia Curling Championships. The Aussies went on to win the match 16–3, after Hong Kong conceded after seven ends. It was the first international event for Hong Kong.

=== Prince Edward Island vs. Nunavut ===
The Prince Edward Island women's team (skipped by Lisa Jackson) scored an eight-ender in the first end of their match against Nunavut (Angela Dale) at the 2015 Travelers Curling Club Championship, Canada's national curling club championship. P.E.I. went on to win the match 21–0, with Nunavut conceding after 6 ends (games at the Travelers are 8 ends in length). This was the first eight-ender ever scored at a national championship in Canada.

=== South Korea vs. Qatar ===
The South Korean's women's national team skipped by Kim Eun-jung scored an eight-ender in the first end of their match against Qatar (skipped by Mubarkah Al-Abdulla) at the 2016 Pacific-Asia Curling Championships. The Koreans went on to win the match 30–0 with Qatar conceding after six ends. It was the first international event for Qatar.

=== United States vs. Brazil ===
The United States women's national team skipped by Nina Roth scored an eight-ender in the sixth end of their first match against Brazil (skipped by Aline Gonçalves) at the 2017 Americas Challenge. The Americans went on to win the game 16–2 with the Brazilians immediately conceding after the 6th end. It was the first international event for the Brazilian women's team.

=== Tardi vs. Schneider ===
Tyler Tardi and his team from Langley stole an eight-ender in the second end of their game against Team Stephen Schneider of Vancouver in their final round-robin game at the 2018 King Cash Spiel, an event on the World Curling Tour. Even though it was just the second end, Team Schneider conceded, losing the game 10–0. Tardi went on to win the event.

=== Switzerland vs. Denmark ===
The Swiss national women's curling team skipped by Silvana Tirinzoni scored an eight-ender in the seventh end of their game against Denmark's Madeleine Dupont at the 2021 World Women's Curling Championship. Already sitting seven, Swiss fourth Alina Pätz just needed a draw to the full twelve–foot or better for the eighth point. After her successful throw, Denmark conceded, with the final score of the match being 13–4. It was the first eight-ender scored in World Curling Championships history (men or women).

=== Italy vs. Nigeria ===
The Italian men's junior team skipped by Giacomo Colli scored an eight-ender in the first end of their game against Nigeria (skipped by Kamsiyochukwu Dike) at the 2022 World Junior-B Curling Championships. Italy went on to win the game 18–3. It was the first competition for the Nigerian junior team.

=== Rørvik vs. Zelingrová ===
Marianne Rørvik and her team from Oslo, Norway, scored an eight-ender in the sixth end of their game against Team Alžběta Zelingrová of Prague, Czech Republic, in their first round-robin game at the 2023 Mercure Perth Masters. The game was tied 2–2 after the fifth end before the Norwegian team scored the eight-ender to secure a commanding 10–2 victory.

=== Smith vs. Steele ===
Greg Smith and his St. John's, Newfoundland and Labrador, rink stole an eight-ender in the third end of their game against Colten Steele of Dartmouth, Nova Scotia, at the 2023 Superstore Monctonian Challenge. Already up 3–0, the steal put Team Smith up eleven points, which was followed by immediate concession by Team Steele.

=== Turkey vs. Nigeria ===
In the third draw of the mixed team event at the 2024 Winter Youth Olympics, Turkey's Muhammed Taha Zenit counted eight in the first end of their game against Nigeria's Goodnews Charles. The Turkish team went on to win the game 22–2 after six ends. The Youth Olympics were the first time the Nigerian team had played on Olympic ice.

=== Ueno vs. Suddens ===
The Miyu Ueno rink from Karuizawa, Japan, scored an eight-ender in the fourth end of their first game of the 2024 Hack2House Alberta Curling Series Event 1 against New Zealand's Chelsea Suddens. Team Ueno, who played without their skip, already led the game 8–1 with the score of eight giving them a 16–1 victory.

=== Qatar vs. Nigeria ===
The Qatari men's team (skipped by Nasser Alyafei) scored an eight-ender in their match against Nigeria (skipped by Harold Woods III) in the B division of the 2024 Pan Continental Curling Championships. They scored the eight-ender in the 5th end of the game, and went on to win 16–2.

=== China vs. Chinese Taipei ===
The Chinese women's team (skipped by Wang Rui) recorded an eight-ender in the first end of their draw 2 game against Chinese Taipei (skipped by Yang Ko) at the 2025 Asian Winter Games. China went on to win the game 14–2.
