= Flurina Kobler =

Swiss curler

- Curler ♀

Team
- Curling club: CC Luzern, Luzern, Zug CC, Zug
- Mixed doubles partner: Yves Hess

Curling career
- Member Association: Switzerland
- World Mixed Doubles Championship: 1 (2016)
Medal record
Curling
Swiss Mixed Doubles Championship
Gold medal – first place	2016 Interlaken

Flurina Kobler is a Swiss curler.

At the national level, she is a 2016 Swiss mixed doubles champion curler.

At the international level, she is a participant of 2016 World Mixed Doubles Curling Championship together with Yves Hess, they finished twenty eight.

== Teams ==
=== Women's ===
Season	Skip	Third	Second	Lead	Alternate	Coach	Events
2011–12	Leandra Mueller	Claudia Zbinden	Rebekka Engel	Flurina Kobler	Nicole Misteli		
2013–14	Andrea Marx	Adonia Brunner	Carole Howald	Gisèle Beuchat	Bettina Lanz, Flurina Kobler	Brigitte Brunner, Beat Brunner	SJCC 2014 (4th)
2014–15	Flurina Kobler (fourth)	Adonia Brunner (skip)	Laura Engler	Gisele Beuchat	Claudia Baumann		
2016–17	Corrie Hürlimann	Flurina Kobler	Melina Bezzola	Jessica Jäggi			
2016–17	Lisa Gisler	Janine Wyss	Corina Mani	Sina Wettstein	Flurina Kobler	Urs Dick	SWCC 2017 (5th)
2018–19	Corrie Hürlimann	Flurina Kobler	Melina Bezzola	Jessica Jäggi	Esther Kobler	Rodger Gustaf Schmidt	SWCC 2019 (7th)
2019–20	Corrie Hürlimann	Flurina Kobler	Melina Bezzola	Jessica Jäggi	Anna Stern	Janet Hürlimann	SWCC 2020 (7th)

=== Mixed ===
Season	Skip	Third	Second	Lead	Alternate	Events
2014–15	Simon Biedermann (fourth)	Flurina Kobler (skip)	Neal Schwenter	Corina Mani	Rainer Kobler	SMxCC 2015 (15th)

=== Mixed doubles ===
Season	Male	Female	Coach	Events
2015–16	Yves Hess	Flurina Kobler	Laurence Bidaud (WMDCC)	SMDCC 2016 (gold); WMDCC 2016 (28th)
2016–17	Yves Hess	Flurina Kobler	Peter Studer	SMDCC 2017 (6th)
2019–20	Rainer Kobler	Flurina Kobler		
