= Daniela Rupp =

Swiss curler

- Curler ♀
- Born: 9 May 1986 (age 40)

Team
- Curling club: Curling Club Zug, Zug
- Mixed doubles partner: Kevin Wunderlin

Curling career
- Member Association: Switzerland
- World Mixed Doubles Championship: 1 (2019)
Medal record
Curling
Swiss Women's Championship
Bronze medal – third place	2015 Schaffhausen
Swiss Mixed Doubles Championship
Gold medal – first place	2019 Aarau

Daniela Rupp (born 9 May 1986) is a Swiss curler.

At the national level, she is a 2015 Swiss women's bronze medallist and a 2019 Swiss mixed doubles champion curler.

== Teams ==
=== Women's ===
Season	Skip	Third	Second	Lead	Alternate	Coach	Events
2006–07	Fabienne Fürbringer	Daniela Rupp	Haidi Strucker	Renata Baumgartner			
2006–07	Daniela Rupp	Renata Baumgartner	Heidi Strickler	Martina Nueesch			
2009–10	Vendula Blazkova (fourth)	Fabienne Fürbringer (skip)	Silke Hermann	Annina Reimann	Daniela Rupp, Amanda Hasler	Björn Schröder, Roger Stucki	SWCC 2010 (4th)
2010–11	Fabienne Fürbringer	Vendy Zgraggen	Annina Reimann	Daniela Rupp			
2011–12	Corinne Bourquin	Fabienne Fürbringer	Daniela Rupp	Sandra Ramstein	Janine Wyss	Björn Schröder	SWCC 2012 (6th)
2012–13	Melanie Wild	Sandra Ramstein-Attinger	Daniela Rupp	Janine Wyss			
2012–13	Sandra Ramstein	Daniela Rupp	Melanie Wild	Janine Wyss	Lea Jauch, Corinne Bourguin		SWCC 2013 (6th)
2014–15	Melanie Barbezat	Carole Howald	Jenny Perret	Daniela Rupp			SWCC 2015 (bronze)
2015–16	Melanie Barbezat	Carole Howald	Jenny Perret	Daniela Rupp			
2016–17	Melanie Barbezat	Jenny Perret	Carole Howald	Daniela Rupp			

=== Mixed ===
Season	Skip	Third	Second	Lead	Alternate	Events
2017–18	Matthias Perret	Melanie Barbezat	Oliver Widmer	Daniela Rupp	Neal Schwenter	SMxCC 2018 (4th)

=== Mixed doubles ===
Season	Male	Female	Coach	Events
2017–18	Kevin Wunderlin	Daniela Rupp		SMDCC 2018 (4th)
2018–19	Kevin Wunderlin	Daniela Rupp	Sebastian Stock (WMDCC)	SMDCC 2019 (gold); WMDCC 2019 (9th)
2019–20	Kevin Wunderlin	Daniela Rupp		SMDCC 2020 (15th)
2020–21	Kevin Wunderlin	Daniela Rupp		SMDCC 2021 (8th)
2021–22	Kevin Wunderlin	Daniela Rupp		SMDCC 2022 (bronze)
2022–23	Kevin Wunderlin	Daniela Rupp		
