= Kevin Wunderlin =

Swiss curler

Kevin Wunderlin (born 17 December 1991) is a Swiss curler. He currently skips the Biel/Bienne curling team on the World Curling Tour.

Wunderlin's first international curling experience came at the 2013 European Mixed Curling Championship, when Wunderlin played second for the Swiss team, skipped by Marc Pfister. The team would top their group in the group stage of the event, with a 6-1 record. However, they lost in the quarterfinals to Hungary.

On the World Curling Tour, Wunderlin has won two career events. He won the Thompson Curling Challenge twice; first in 2013 playing lead for Mike Wenger and again in 2016 as a skip.

Wunderlin and partner Daniela Rupp represented Switzerland at the 2019 World Mixed Doubles Curling Championship. After finishing with a 6-1 record in group play, the pair lost to Australia in the round of 16.
