= 2018–19 curling season =

- Sport: Curling

Seasons
- ← 2017–18 2019–20 →

The 2018–19 curling season began in August 2018 and ended in May 2019.

Note: In events with two genders, the men's tournament winners will be listed before the women's tournament winners.

== World Curling Federation events ==
=== Championships ===
Event		Gold	Silver	Bronze
World Mixed Curling Championship; Kelowna, Canada, Oct. 13–20		Canada (Anderson)	Spain (Vez)	Russia (Eremin)
Pacific-Asia Curling Championships; Gangneung, South Korea, Nov. 3–10		Japan (Matsumura)	China (Zou)	South Korea (Kim)
Pacific-Asia Curling Championships; Gangneung, South Korea, Nov. 3–10		South Korea (Kim)	Japan (Fujisawa)	China (Jiang)
World Wheelchair-B Curling Championship; Lohja, Finland, Nov. 9–15		Estonia (Villiste)	Slovakia (Ďuriš)	Latvia (Rozkova)
European Curling Championships; Tallinn, Estonia, Nov. 16–24	A	Scotland (Mouat)	Sweden (Edin)	Italy (Retornaz)
European Curling Championships; Tallinn, Estonia, Nov. 16–24	A	Sweden (Hasselborg)	Switzerland (Tirinzoni)	Germany (Jentsch)
European Curling Championships; Tallinn, Estonia, Nov. 16–24	B	Denmark (Poulsen)	England (Reed)	Czech Republic (Šik)
European Curling Championships; Tallinn, Estonia, Nov. 16–24	B	Norway (Skaslien)	Estonia (Turmann)	Turkey (Yıldız)
World Junior-B Curling Championships; Lohja, Finland, Jan. 2–10		New Zealand (Neilson)	Italy (Rizzoli)	China (Wang)
World Junior-B Curling Championships; Lohja, Finland, Jan. 2–10		Scotland (Farmer)	Russia (Rumiantseva)	Japan (Enami)
World Junior Curling Championships; Liverpool, Canada, Feb. 16–23		Canada (Tardi)	Switzerland (Hösli)	Scotland (Whyte)
World Junior Curling Championships; Liverpool, Canada, Feb. 16–23		Russia (Rumiantseva)	Canada (Sturmay)	Switzerland (Keiser)
Winter Universiade; Krasnoyarsk, Russia, Mar. 3–10		Norway (Ramsfjell)	Canada (Sturmay)	United Kingdom (Whyte)
Winter Universiade; Krasnoyarsk, Russia, Mar. 3–10		Sweden (Wranå)	South Korea (Kim)	Russia (Komarova)
World Wheelchair Curling Championship; Stirling, Scotland, Mar. 3–10		China (Wang)	Scotland (Neilson)	South Korea (Cha)
World Women's Curling Championship; Silkeborg, Denmark, Mar. 16–24		Switzerland (Tirinzoni)	Sweden (Hasselborg)	South Korea (Kim)
World Men's Curling Championship; Lethbridge, Canada, Mar. 30 – Apr. 7		Sweden (Edin)	Canada (Koe)	Switzerland (de Cruz)
European Curling Championships; Brașov, Romania, Apr. 12–17	C	France (Mercier)	Bulgaria (Steiler)	Slovenia (Čulić)
European Curling Championships; Brașov, Romania, Apr. 12–17	C	Belarus (Pavlyuchik)	Slovakia (Kajanova)	Austria (Ocker)
World Mixed Doubles Curling Championship; Stavanger, Norway, Apr. 20–27		Sweden (Hasselborg/Eriksson)	Canada (Peterman/Gallant)	United States (Christensen/Shuster)
World Senior Curling Championships; Stavanger, Norway, Apr. 20–27		Canada (Cochrane)	Scotland (Smith)	Denmark (Schmidt)
World Senior Curling Championships; Stavanger, Norway, Apr. 20–27		Canada (Anderson)	Denmark (Bidstrup Nyboe)	Switzerland (Forrer)

=== Qualification events ===
Event	Qualifiers
Americas Challenge; Chaska, United States, Nov. 16–18	United States (Ruohonen)
World Qualification Event; Naseby, New Zealand, Jan. 18–23	South Korea (Kim); Netherlands (van Dorp)
World Qualification Event; Naseby, New Zealand, Jan. 18–23	China (Mei); Finland (Kauste)

=== Curling World Cup ===
Event		Gold	Finalist
First Leg; Suzhou, China, Sep. 12–16	W	Canada (Homan)	Sweden (Hasselborg)
First Leg; Suzhou, China, Sep. 12–16	M	Canada (Koe)	Norway (Walstad)
First Leg; Suzhou, China, Sep. 12–16	MD	Canada (Walker / Muyres)	United States (Anderson / Dropkin)
Second Leg; Omaha, United States, Dec. 5–9	W	Japan (Fujisawa)	South Korea (Kim)
Second Leg; Omaha, United States, Dec. 5–9	M	United States (Shuster)	Sweden (Edin)
Second Leg; Omaha, United States, Dec. 5–9	MD	Norway (Skaslien / Nedregotten)	Switzerland (Perret / Rios)
Third Leg; Jönköping, Sweden, Jan. 30 – Feb. 3	W	South Korea (Kim)	Sweden (Hasselborg)
Third Leg; Jönköping, Sweden, Jan. 30 – Feb. 3	M	Canada (Dunstone)	Sweden (Edin)
Third Leg; Jönköping, Sweden, Jan. 30 – Feb. 3	MD	Canada (Sahaidak / Lott)	Norway (Skaslien / Ulsrud)

Event		Gold	Silver	Bronze
Grand Final; Beijing, China, May 8–12	W	Canada (Jones)	Switzerland (Tirinzoni)	Russia (Sidorova)
Grand Final; Beijing, China, May 8–12	M	Canada (Koe)	China (Zou)	Scotland (Paterson)
Grand Final; Beijing, China, May 8–12	MD	Norway (Skaslien / Nedregotten)	Canada (Walker / Muyres)	United States (Anderson / Dropkin)

== Curling Canada events ==
=== Championships ===
Event	Gold	Silver	Bronze
Canadian Mixed Curling Championship; Winnipeg, Manitoba, Nov. 5–10	Manitoba (Kurz)	Nova Scotia (Thompson)	Quebec (Asselin)
Curling Club Championship; Miramichi, New Brunswick, Nov. 19–24	British Columbia (Shimizu)	Nova Scotia (Roach)	Ontario (Dupuis)
Curling Club Championship; Miramichi, New Brunswick, Nov. 19–24	Alberta (Muise)	Nova Scotia (Williams)	Ontario (Hogan)
Canadian Junior Curling Championships; Prince Albert, Saskatchewan, Jan. 19–27	British Columbia (Tardi)	Manitoba (Ryan)	Saskatchewan (Kleiter)
Canadian Junior Curling Championships; Prince Albert, Saskatchewan, Jan. 19–27	Alberta (Sturmay)	British Columbia (Daniels)	Nova Scotia (Jones)
Scotties Tournament of Hearts; Sydney, Nova Scotia, Feb. 16–24	Alberta (Carey)	Ontario (Homan)	Saskatchewan (Silvernagle)
Canada Winter Games; Red Deer, Alberta, Feb. 24–Mar. 2	British Columbia (Sato)	Ontario (Del Conte)	Manitoba (Loewen)
Canada Winter Games; Red Deer, Alberta, Feb. 24–Mar. 2	Ontario (Croisier)	Manitoba (Bergman)	Nova Scotia (Moore)
Tim Hortons Brier; Brandon, Manitoba, Mar. 2–10	Alberta (Koe)	(Alberta) Wildcard (Bottcher)	Northern Ontario (Jacobs)
CCAA/Curling Canada Championships; Fredericton, New Brunswick, Mar. 15–19	(Alberta) Concordia Thunder	(Ontario) Humber Hawks	(Alberta) NAIT Ooks
CCAA/Curling Canada Championships; Fredericton, New Brunswick, Mar. 15–19	(British Columbia) Douglas Royals	(Alberta) MacEwan Griffins	(Alberta) Augustana Vikings
U Sports/Curling Canada University Curling Championships; Fredericton, New Brunswick, Mar. 15–19	(Ontario) Carleton Ravens	(Newfoundland and Labrador) Memorial University	Alberta Golden Bears
U Sports/Curling Canada University Curling Championships; Fredericton, New Brunswick, Mar. 15–19	(Ontario) Laurentian Voyageurs	(Ontario) Brock Badgers	(Nova Scotia) Dalhousie Tigers
Canadian Mixed Doubles Curling Championship; Fredericton, New Brunswick, Mar. 19–24	(Manitoba) Peterman / (Newfoundland and Labrador) Gallant	(Saskatchewan) Martin / (British Columbia) Griffith	(Alberta) Walker / (Saskatchewan) Muyres (Manitoba) Sahaidak / Lott
Canadian Senior Curling Championships; Chilliwack, British Columbia, Mar. 22–28	Saskatchewan (Korte)	Ontario (Cochrane)	Alberta (White)
Canadian Senior Curling Championships; Chilliwack, British Columbia, Mar. 22–28	Saskatchewan (Anderson)	Ontario (Middaugh)	Alberta (Bakker)
Canadian Under-18 Boys and Girls Curling Championships; Sherwood Park, Alberta, Apr. 2–7	Ontario (Niepage)	British Columbia (Colwell)	Manitoba (McDonald)
Canadian Under-18 Boys and Girls Curling Championships; Sherwood Park, Alberta, Apr. 2–7	Northern Ontario (Croisier)	Ontario (Deschenes)	British Columbia (Buchy)
Canadian Wheelchair Curling Championship; Boucherville, Quebec, Apr. 26 – May 1	Alberta (Smart)	Manitoba (Thiessen)	Ontario 1 (Armstrong)

=== Other events ===
Event	Winner	Runner-up
Canada Cup; Estevan, Saskatchewan, Dec. 5–9	(Ontario) Brad Jacobs	(Alberta) Kevin Koe
Canada Cup; Estevan, Saskatchewan, Dec. 5–9	(Manitoba) Jennifer Jones	(Manitoba) Kerri Einarson
Continental Cup; Las Vegas, Nevada, Jan. 17–20	(Scotland) (Sweden) (Switzerland) Team World	(Canada) (United States) Team North America
All-Star Curling Skins Game (Note: The All-Star Curling Skins Game is run by TSN and is not sanctioned by Curling Canada.); Banff, Alberta, Feb. 1–3	Team Bottcher	Team Koe
All-Star Curling Skins Game; Banff, Alberta, Feb. 1–3	Team Jones	Team Fleury

=== Provincial and territorial playdowns ===
Province/ territory	Men			Women		
Province/ territory	Event	Champion	Runner-up	Event	Champion	Runner-up
Alberta; Stettler, Jan. 23 – 27 (Women's); Edmonton, Feb. 6 – 10 (Men's)	Boston Pizza Cup	Kevin Koe	Ted Appelman	Alberta Scotties	Chelsea Carey	Kelsey Rocque
British Columbia; Quesnel, Jan. 29 – Feb. 3	BC Men's Championship	Jim Cotter	Jason Montgomery	British Columbia Scotties	Sarah Wark	Corryn Brown
Manitoba; Gimli, Jan. 23 – 27 (Women's); Virden, Feb. 6 – 10 (Men's)	Viterra Championship	Mike McEwen	William Lyburn	Manitoba Scotties	Tracy Fleury	Kerri Einarson
New Brunswick; Moncton, Jan. 23 – 27	NB Tankard	Terry Odishaw	James Grattan	New Brunswick Scotties	Andrea Crawford	Sarah Malais
Newfoundland and Labrador; St. John's, Jan. 10 – 12 (Women's); Jan. 29 – Feb. 3 (Men's)	Newfoundland and Labrador Tankard	Andrew Symonds	Rick Rowsell	Newfoundland and Labrador Scotties	Kelli Sharpe	Cathlia Ward
Northern Ontario; Nipigon, Jan. 30 – Feb. 3	NOCA Men's Provincial Championship	Brad Jacobs	Tanner Horgan	Northern Ontario Scotties	Krista McCarville	Jenna Enge
Northwest Territories; Yellowknife, Jan. 10 – 11 (Women's); Feb. 7 – 10 (Men's)	Northwest Territories; Men's Championship	Jamie Koe	Greg Skauge	Northwest; Territories Scotties	Kerry Galusha	Tyanna Bain
Nova Scotia; Dartmouth, Jan. 21 – 27	Deloitte Tankard	Stuart Thompson	Jamie Murphy	Nova Scotia Scotties	Jill Brothers	Mary-Anne Arsenault
Nunavut	Brier Playdowns	Jake Higgs	Dave St. Louis	Nunavut Scotties	Jennie Bodner	Robyn Mackey; Sadie Pinksen
Ontario; Elmira, Jan. 27 – Feb. 3	Ontario Tankard	Scott McDonald	John Epping	Ontario Scotties	Rachel Homan	Julie Tippin
Prince Edward Island; Alberton, Jan. 9 – 13	Prince Edward; Island Tankard	John Likely	Eddie MacKenzie	Prince Edward; Island Scotties	Suzanne Birt	Veronica Smith
Quebec; Grand-Mère, Jan. 13 – 20	WFG Tankard	Martin Crête	Michael Fournier	Quebec Scotties	Gabrielle Lavoie	Émilia Gagné
Saskatchewan; Humboldt, Jan. 22 – 27 (Women's); Whitewood, Feb. 6 – 10 (Men's)	SaskTel Tankard	Kirk Muyres	Matt Dunstone	Saskatchewan Scotties	Robyn Silvernagle	Sherry Anderson
Yukon; Whitehorse, Feb. 7 – 10	Yukon Men's Championship	Jon Solberg	Thomas Scoffin	–	Nicole Baldwin	–

== World Curling Tour ==
=== Teams ===
See: List of teams on the 2018–19 World Curling Tour

Grand Slam events in bold.

=== Men's events ===
Week	Event	Winning skip	Runner-up skip	Purse (CAD (Note: Prize winnings converted from local currency for events held outside Canada))	Winner's share (CAD)	SFM
1	Hokkaido Bank Curling Classic; Hokkaido, Japan, Aug. 2–5	(Japan) Masaki Iwai	(Japan) Shingo Usui	$19,822	$11,660	2.6719
2	Baden Masters; Baden, Switzerland, Aug. 24–26	(Norway) Thomas Ulsrud	(Sweden) Niklas Edin	$41,051	$14,567	6.9188
2	GOLDLINE Icebreaker at The Granite; Winnipeg, Manitoba, Aug. 24–26	(Manitoba) Braden Calvert	(United States) John Shuster	$7,680	$2,200	4.5841
3	Oakville Fall Classic; Oakville, Ontario, Aug. 30 – Sep. 2	(Japan) Yuta Matsumura	(Saskatchewan) Matt Dunstone	$12,000	$3,000	5.6040
4	Stu Sells Oakville Tankard; Oakville, Ontario, Sep. 6–9	(Switzerland) Yannick Schwaller	(Ontario) Wayne Tuck Jr.	$26,000	$7,500	6.9144
5	Curling World Cup Suzhou; Suzhou, China, Sep. 10–16	(Alberta) Kevin Koe	(Norway) Steffen Walstad			8.4094
5	AMJ Campbell Shorty Jenkins Classic; Cornwall, Ontario, Sep. 13–16	(Ontario) John Epping	(Ontario) Brad Jacobs	$59,000	$15,000	8.6875
5	King Cash Spiel; Maple Ridge, British Columbia, Sep. 14–16	(British Columbia) Tyler Tardi	(British Columbia) Josh Barry	$9,600	$4,500	2.0232
6	Mother Club Fall Curling Classic; Winnipeg, Manitoba, Sep. 20–23	(Manitoba) Tanner Lott	(United States) Mark Fenner	$8,000	$1,800	4.0800
6	KW Fall Classic; Waterloo, Ontario, Sep. 20–23	(Russia) Alexey Timofeev	(Ontario) Rob Ainsley	$8,400	$2,000	3.0128
7	**Princess Auto Elite 10**; Chatham, Ontario, Sep. 26–30	(Newfoundland and Labrador) Brad Gushue	(Manitoba) Reid Carruthers	$100,000	$26,000	9.6281
7	Avonair Cash Spiel; Edmonton, Alberta, Sep. 27–30	(Alberta) Karsten Sturmay	(Alberta) Thomas Usselman	$12,000	$3,400	3.1871
7	Prestige Hotels & Resorts Curling Classic; Vernon, British Columbia, Sep. 28–30	(Saskatchewan) Matt Dunstone	(British Columbia) Jim Cotter	$12,000	$5,000	3.1327
7	Tallinn Mens International Challenger; Tallinn, Estonia, Sep. 28–30	(Belarus) Ilya Shalamitski	(Finland) Tomi Rantamaki	$3,752	$1,801	1.5722
7	KKP Classic; Winnipeg, Manitoba, Sep. 28–30	(Manitoba) Tanner Lott	(Manitoba) Dennis Bohn	$5,000	$1,500	3.6465
7	The Curling Store Cashspiel; Lower Sackville, Nova Scotia, Sep. 28–30	(Nova Scotia) Stuart Thompson	(Nova Scotia) Ian Fitzner-Leblanc	$5,250	$2,100	1.9633
8	Stu Sells Toronto Tankard; Toronto, Ontario, Oct. 5–8	(Manitoba) Reid Carruthers	(Nova Scotia) Stuart Thompson	$42,000	$12,000	7.3072
8	Swiss Cup Basel; Basel, Switzerland, Oct. 4–7	(Sweden) Niklas Edin	(Norway) Steffen Walstad	$52,246	$18,287	7.1778
8	St. Paul Let's Cure Lupus Cash Spiel; St. Paul, Minnesota, Oct. 5–7	(United States) Andrew Stopera	(United States) Mark Fenner	$17,756	$5,184	2.9829
8	Manitoba Curling Tour Classic; Winnipeg, Manitoba, Oct. 5–8	(Manitoba) Riley Smith	(Manitoba) Dennis Bohn	$9,600	$1,800	3.5644
8	Bud Light Men's Cash Spiel; Halifax, Nova Scotia, Oct. 5–8	(Nova Scotia) Kendal Thompson	(Nova Scotia) Chad Stevens	$6,400	$1,750	1.8479
8	Minebea Mitsumi Cup; Miyota, Japan, Oct. 6–8	(Japan) Junpei Kanda	(Japan) Yoshihiro Sakaguchi			
9	Canad Inns Men's Classic; Portage la Prairie, Manitoba, Oct. 12–15	(Alberta) Brendan Bottcher	(Alberta) Kevin Koe	$56,000	$18,000	9.3438
9	Driving Force Abbotsford Cashpiel; Abbotsford, British Columbia, Oct. 12–14	(Japan) Yuta Matsumura	(British Columbia) Sean Geall	$22,800	$8,000	2.6944
9	Atkins Curling Supplies Classic; Winnipeg, Manitoba, Oct. 12–15	(Manitoba) Corey Chambers	(Manitoba) Ty Dilello	$10,000	$2,500	3.2169
9	Stroud Sleeman Cash Spiel; Stroud, Ontario, Oct. 11–14	(Ontario) John Willsey	(Ontario) Cory Heggestad	$9,800	$2,800	2.8281
9	McKee Homes Fall Curling Classic; Airdrie, Alberta, Oct. 12–14	(Alberta) Jeremy Harty	(Alberta) Terry Meek	$12,800	$3,400	2.4214
9	Kalamazoo Men's Classic; Kalamazoo, Michigan, Oct. 12–14	(Ontario) Rick Law	(United States) Stephen Imes	$2,997	$1,172	0.8808
10	Curling Masters Champery; Champery, Switzerland, Oct. 18–21	(Switzerland) Peter De Cruz	(Scotland) Glen Muirhead	$59,248	$18,433	5.9400
10	Challenge de Curling de Gatineau (Arena); Masson, Quebec, Oct. 18–21	(Ontario) Scott McDonald	(Ontario) Charley Thomas	$37,000	$11,000	5.7530
10	Medicine Hat Charity Classic; Medicine Hat, Alberta, Oct. 19–22	(Alberta) Ted Appelman	(Saskatchewan) Kirk Muyres	$28,000	$9,000	4.6541
10	China Open; Chongqing, China, Oct. 16–22	(Russia) Sergey Glukhov	(Newfoundland and Labrador) Brad Gushue	$124,549	$65,552	4.3875
11	**Masters of Curling**; Truro, Nova Scotia, Oct. 23–28	(Ontario) John Epping	(Alberta) Kevin Koe	$125,000	$30,000	11.4448
11	Huron ReproGraphics Oil Heritage Classic Sarnia, Ontario, Oct. 25–28	(Ontario) John Willsey	(United States) Mark Fenner	$19,000	$5,200	4.6218
11	Kamloops Crown of Curling; Kamloops, British Columbia, Oct. 26–28	(British Columbia) Sean Geall	(British Columbia) Josh Barry	$16,000	$5,000	3.0109
11	Latvia International Challenger; Tukums, Latvia, Oct. 25–28	(Finland) Willie Makela	(Estonia) Harri Lill	$4,478	$2,090	1.3845
12	DeKalb Superspiel; Morris, Manitoba, Nov. 2–5	(Saskatchewan) Matt Dunstone	(Saskatchewan) Kirk Muyres	$45,000	$11,000	6.9850
12	Dave Jones Alexander Keith's Mayflower Cashspiel; Halifax, Nova Scotia, Nov. 1–4	(Nova Scotia) Jamie Murphy	(Ontario) Scott McDonald	$20,000	$4,000	3.5178
12	Raymond James Kelowna Double Cash; Kelowna, British Columbia, Nov. 2–4	(British Columbia) Jim Cotter	(British Columbia) Tyler Tardi	$18,000	$4,000	2.7641
12	Prague Classic; Prague, Czech Republic, Nov. 1–4	(Scotland) Cameron Bryce	(Poland) Borys Jasiecki	$23,141	$7,465	2.1011
12	Grand Prix Bern Inter Curling Challenge; Bern, Switzerland, Nov. 2–4	(Italy) Amos Mosaner	(Scotland) Robin Brydone	$22,576	$6,544	3.1131
13	**GSOC Tour Challenge Tier 1** Thunder Bay, Ontario, Nov. 6–11	(Ontario) Brad Jacobs	(Alberta) Brendan Bottcher	$100,000	$20,000	10.5400
13	**GSOC Tour Challenge Tier 2** Thunder Bay, Ontario, Nov. 6–11	(Saskatchewan) Kirk Muyres	(Ontario) Scott McDonald	$50,000	$10,000	6.2581
13	Original 16 WCT Bonspiel; Calgary, Alberta, Nov. 9–11	(Alberta) Ted Appelman	(Alberta) James Pahl	$25,000	$6,200	3.2080
14	Red Deer Curling Classic; Red Deer, Alberta, Nov. 16–19	(Saskatchewan) Kody Hartung	(Alberta) Brendan Bottcher	$35,000	$10,000	5.4350
14	Stu Sells 1824 Halifax Classic; Halifax, Nova Scotia, Nov. 15–18	(Ontario) Scott Howard	(Newfoundland and Labrador) Brad Gushue	$25,000	$8,000	4.6753
14	King Spud Classic Berth Spiel; Carberry, Manitoba, Nov. 16–18	(Manitoba) Corey Chambers	(Manitoba) Graham Freeman	$6,500	$2,000	2.1149
14	Fort Wayne Mad Anthony CashSpiel; Fort Wayne, Indiana, Nov. 16–18	(United States) David Falco	(United States) Scott Dunnam	$3,192	$1,197	1.0570
15	Ashley Home Store Curling Classic; Penticton, British Columbia, Nov. 23–26	(Scotland) Glen Muirhead	(Scotland) Ross Paterson	$66,000	$18,000	8.1406
15	Challenge Casino de Charlevoix; Clermont, Quebec, Nov. 22–25	(Quebec) Jean-Sébastien Roy	(Quebec) Michael Fournier	$27,000	$8,000	3.8951
15	The Sunova Spiel at East St. Paul; East St. Paul, Manitoba, Nov. 23–26	(Manitoba) Braden Calvert	(Manitoba) David Bohn	$10,500	$2,900	3.8804
15	Black Diamond / High River Cash; Black Diamond & High River, Alberta, Nov. 23–25	(Alberta) Thomas Usselman	(Alberta) Desmond Young	$7,100	$2,000	1.5107
16	Curl Mesabi Classic; Eveleth, United States, Nov. 30 – Dec. 2	(United States) Rich Ruohonen	(United States) Mark Fenner	$24,149	$6,634	3.5691
16	Nissan Curling Classic; Paris, Ontario, Nov. 30 – Dec. 2	(Ontario) Glenn Howard	(Ontario) Tanner Horgan	$16,000	$5,000	4.0619
16	Thistle Integrity Stakes; Winnipeg, Manitoba, Dec. 1–3	(Manitoba) Braden Calvert	(Manitoba) Colton Lott	$4,800	$1,300	2.9282
17	Home Hardware Canada Cup of Curling; Estevan, Saskatchewan, Dec. 5–9	(Ontario) Brad Jacobs	(Alberta) Kevin Koe	$70,000	$24,000	11.5606
17	Curling World Cup Omaha; Omaha, United States, Dec. 5–9	(United States) John Shuster	(Sweden) Niklas Edin			7.8595
17	WFG Jim Sullivan Curling Classic; Saint John, New Brunswick, Dec. 7–9	(Nova Scotia) Kendal Thompson	(Nova Scotia) Jamie Murphy	$15,300	$5,000	3.0019
17	Farmers Edge SCT; Wadena, Saskatchewan, Dec. 7–9	(Saskatchewan) Kody Hartung	(China) Tian Jiafeng	$11,500	$4,500	1.7114
17	MCT Championships; Morris, Manitoba, Dec. 7–9	(Manitoba) Riley Smith	(Manitoba) Ty Dilello	$4,400	$1,600	3.2812
18	**Boost National**; Conception Bay South, Newfoundland and Labrador, Dec. 11–16	(Scotland) Ross Paterson	(Scotland) Bruce Mouat	$125,000	$30,000	11.5514
18	Dakota Challenger Spiel; Lakeville, Minnesota, Dec. 14–16	(United States) Dominik Märki	(United States) Jed Brundidge	$1,844	$818	
18	Dumfries Challenger Series; Dumfries, Scotland, Dec. 14–16	(Netherlands) Jaap van Dorp	(Switzerland) Lucien Lottenbach	$16,923	$6,770	2.3798
19	Karuizawa International; Karuizawa, Japan, Dec. 20–23	(Manitoba) Reid Carruthers	(Japan) Yuta Matsumura	$48,907	$15,894	3.4875
19	Qinghai Curling Elite; Xining, China, Dec. 14–19	(Saskatchewan) Matt Dunstone	(Czech Republic) Lukas Klima	$40,156	$20,078	3.7240
20	ASHAM U.S. Open of Curling; Blaine, United States, Dec. 28–31	(South Korea) Kim Soo-hyuk	(Ontario) Mike McCarville	$21,229	$5,971	2.5334
21	Mercure Perth Masters; Perth, Scotland, Jan. 3–6	(Scotland) Bruce Mouat	(Scotland) Glen Muirhead	$30,989	$12,260	5.4279
22	**Meridian Canadian Open**; North Battleford, Saskatchewan, Jan. 8–13	(Alberta) Brendan Bottcher	(Ontario) John Epping	$100,000	$30,000	11.6325
22	WCT Kurosawa Cup; Miyota, Japan, Jan. 12–14	(Japan) Tsuyoshi Yamaguchi	(Japan) Marina Oiwa (♀)	$6,070	$2,428	1.1464
24	Ed Werenich Golden Wrench Classic; Tempe, Arizona, Jan. 24–27	(Manitoba) Reid Carruthers	(Saskatchewan) Kirk Muyres	$18,700	$8,541	4.2633
25	Curling World Cup Jönköping; Jönköping, Sweden, Jan. 30 – Feb. 3	(Saskatchewan) Matt Dunstone	(Sweden) Niklas Edin			7.2773
25	Red Square Classic; Moscow, Russia, Jan. 30–Feb. 3	(Russia) Sergei Glukhov	(Russia) Alexey Timofeev			
35	**Players' Championship**; Toronto, Ontario, Apr. 9–14	(Alberta) Brendan Bottcher	(Alberta) Kevin Koe	$100,000	$30,000	11.3816
37	**Humpty's Champions Cup**; Saskatoon, Saskatchewan, Apr. 23–28	(Alberta) Brendan Bottcher	(Alberta) Kevin Koe	$150,000	$40,000	10.4044
39	Curling World Cup Grand Final; Beijing, China, May 8–12	(Alberta) Kevin Koe	(China) Zou Qiang			8.6034

=== Women's events ===
Week	Event	Winning skip	Runner-up skip	Purse (CAD)	Winner's share (CAD)	SFM
1	Hokkaido Bank Curling Classic; Hokkaido, Japan, Aug. 2–5	(South Korea) Kim Min-ji	(Japan) Chiaki Matsumura	$19,822	$11,660	3.5156
2	Icebreaker at The Granite; Winnipeg, Manitoba, Aug. 24–26	(Manitoba) Darcy Robertson	(Russia) Anna Sidorova	$6,020	$2,100	4.8113
3	Oakville Fall Classic; Oakville, Ontario, Aug. 30 – Sep. 2	(Japan) Sayaka Yoshimura	(Ontario) Erica Hopson	$7,200	$2,000	4.1290
4	HDF Insurance Shoot-Out; Edmonton, Alberta, Sep. 6–9	(Alberta) Casey Scheidegger	(Russia) Alina Kovaleva	$23,000	$8,000	5.3393
4	Stu Sells Oakville Tankard; Oakville, Ontario, Sep. 6–9	(Manitoba) Kerri Einarson	(Switzerland) Silvana Tirinzoni	$26,000	$7,500	7.2036
5	Curling World Cup Suzhou; Suzhou, China, Sep. 10–16	(Ontario) Rachel Homan	(Sweden) Anna Hasselborg			8.1183
5	AMJ Campbell Shorty Jenkins Classic; Cornwall, Ontario, Sep. 13–16	(Sweden) Isabella Wranå	(Ontario) Hollie Duncan	$34,500	$10,400	7.1896
5	Colonial Square Ladies Classic; Saskatoon, Saskatchewan, Sep. 14–17	(Manitoba) Darcy Robertson	(Japan) Sayaka Yoshimura	$27,000	$7,500	5.7350
5	King Cash Spiel; Maple Ridge, British Columbia, Sep. 14–16	(British Columbia) Corryn Brown	(British Columbia) Diane Gushulak	$8,000	$4,000	2.6643
5	Morris SunSpiel; Morris, Manitoba, Sep. 14–16	(Manitoba) Kerri Einarson	(Manitoba) Kristy Watling	$4,800	$1,800	3.1094
6	Mother Club Fall Curling Classic; Winnipeg, Manitoba, Sep. 20–23	(Manitoba) Kerri Einarson	(Manitoba) Allison Flaxey	$9,000	$2,000	4.1508
6	KW Fall Classic; Waterloo, Ontario, Sep. 20–23	(Ontario) Krista McCarville	(Ontario) Jestyn Murphy	$8,400	$3,000	4.5765
7	**Princess Auto Elite 10**; Chatham, Ontario, Sep. 26–30	(Sweden) Anna Hasselborg	(Switzerland) Silvana Tirinzoni	$100,000	$24,000	10.4301
7	Prestige Hotels & Resorts Curling Classic; Vernon, British Columbia, Sep. 28–30	(Russia) Alina Kovaleva	(Alberta) Kelsey Rocque	$41,000	$8,800	5.6194
7	Avonair Cash Spiel; Edmonton, Alberta, Sep. 27–30	(Alberta) Nicky Kaufman	(Alberta) Tiffany Steuber	$9,000	$2,500	2.7287
7	The Curling Store Cashspiel; Lower Sackville, Nova Scotia, Sep. 28–30	(Nova Scotia) Tanya Hilliard	(Nova Scotia) Colleen Jones	$5,350	$2,100	2.5460
7	Tallinn Ladies International Challenger; Tallinn, Estonia, Sep. 28–30	(Switzerland) Ursi Hegner	(Estonia) Maile Mölder	$3,752	$1,801	2.4706
7	Manitoba Curling Tour Classic; Winnipeg, Manitoba, Sep. 28–30	(Manitoba) Jennifer Clark-Rouire	(Manitoba) Deb McCreanor	$4,800	$1,800	2.1738
8	Stockholm Ladies Curling Cup; Stockholm, Sweden, Oct. 5–7	(Sweden) Anna Hasselborg	(Russia) Anna Sidorova	$47,218	$15,835	7.1213
8	Curlers Corner Autumn Gold Curling Classic; Calgary, Alberta, Oct. 5–8	(Manitoba) Kerri Einarson	(Manitoba) Jennifer Jones	$50,000	$13,500	9.9615
8	Stu Sells Toronto Tankard; Toronto, Ontario, Oct. 5–8	(Ontario) Kira Brunton	(Ontario) Cathy Auld	$20,000	$5,000	5.1413
8	New Scotland Clothing Ladies Cashspiel; Halifax, Nova Scotia, Oct. 5–8	(Nova Scotia) Mary-Anne Arsenault	(Nova Scotia) Mary Myketyn-Driscoll	$6,400	$1,750	2.5350
8	St. Paul Let's Cure Lupus Cash Spiel; St. Paul, Minnesota, Oct. 5–7	(United States) Annmarie Dubberstein	(United States) Allison Pottinger	$5,651	$2,074	1.8378
9	Womens Masters Basel; Basel, Switzerland, Oct. 12–14	(Switzerland) Elena Stern	(Switzerland) Binia Feltscher	$39,462	$13,154	5.5781
9	Driving Force Abbotsford Cashpiel; Abbotsford, British Columbia, Oct. 12–14	(British Columbia) Sarah Wark	(British Columbia) Corryn Brown	$15,800	$5,000	3.6467
9	Atkins Curling Supplies Classic; Winnipeg, Manitoba, Oct. 12–15	(Manitoba) Barb Spencer	(Manitoba) Kristy Watling	$9,400	$2,200	3.1668
9	Stroud Sleeman Cash Spiel; Stroud, Ontario, Oct. 11–14	(Ontario) Jaimee Gardner	(Ontario) Kirsten Marshall	$6,800	$2,000	2.4413
10	Canad Inns Women's Classic; Portage la Prairie, Manitoba, Oct. 18–21	(Alberta) Chelsea Carey	(Manitoba) Kerri Einarson	$60,000	$15,000	10.1877
10	Paf Masters Tour; Åland, Finland, Oct. 18–21	(Sweden) Isabella Wranå	(Japan) Sayaka Yoshimura	$27,041	$12,769	3.2663
10	Medicine Hat Charity Classic; Medicine Hat, Alberta, Oct. 19–22	(Saskatchewan) Kourtney Fesser	(Alberta) Jodi Marthaller	$10,100	$3,200	3.2846
10	China Open; Chongqing, China, Oct. 16–22	(Russia) Alina Kovaleva	(Switzerland) Ursi Hegner	$131,104	$65,552	4.6125
11	**Masters of Curling**; Truro, Nova Scotia, Oct. 23–28	(Sweden) Anna Hasselborg	(Ontario) Rachel Homan	$125,000	$30,000	11.8071
11	Kamloops Crown of Curling; Kamloops, British Columbia, Oct. 26–28	(British Columbia) Sarah Wark	(British Columbia) Kim Slattery	$9,950	$4,200	2.8540
11	Gord Carroll Curling Classic; Whitby, Ontario, Oct. 26–28	(Ontario) Chelsea Brandwood	(South Korea) Un-Chi Gim	$15,100	$4,500	4.4509
11	Latvia International Challenger; Tukums, Latvia, Oct. 25–28	(Scotland) Maggie Wilson	(Finland) Oona Kauste	$4,478	$2,090	1.8732
12	DeKalb Superspiel; Morris, Manitoba, Nov. 2–5	(Manitoba) Allison Flaxey	(Manitoba) Jennifer Clark-Rouire	$45,000	$8,000	5.3191
12	Royal LePage Women's Fall Classic; Kemptville, Ontario, Nov. 1–4	(Northwest Territories) Kerry Galusha	(Nova Scotia) Mary-Anne Arsenault	$21,000	$6,000	4.3553
12	Dave Jones Stanhope Simpson Insurance Mayflower Cashspiel; Halifax, Nova Scotia, Nov. 1–4	(Nova Scotia) Jill Brothers	(Prince Edward Island) Veronica Smith	$7,500	$3,000	2.5411
12	Sunset Ranch Kelowna Double Cash; Kelowna, British Columbia, Nov. 2–4	(British Columbia) Corryn Brown	(British Columbia) Kim Slattery	$9,000	$3,400	2.6033
13	**GSOC Tour Challenge Tier 1** Thunder Bay, Ontario, Nov. 6–11	(Ontario) Rachel Homan	(Manitoba) Tracy Fleury	$100,000	$20,000	10.2688
13	**GSOC Tour Challenge Tier 2** Thunder Bay, Ontario, Nov. 6–11	(Switzerland) Elena Stern	(Japan) Sayaka Yoshimura	$50,000	$10,000	5.9675
13	Crestwood Ladies Fall Classic; Edmonton, Alberta, Nov. 8–11	(Saskatchewan) Kourtney Fesser	(Alberta) Krysta Hilker	$7,000	$2,000	2.5260
13	International ZO Women's Tournament; Wetzikon, Switzerland, Nov. 9–11	(Czech Republic) Anna Kubešková	(Russia) Alina Kovaleva	$18,403	$7,887	3.6398
14	Red Deer Curling Classic; Red Deer, Alberta, Nov. 16–19	(Saskatchewan) Robyn Silvernagle	(China) Mei Jie	$35,000	$10,000	6.1525
15	Boundary Ford Curling Classic; Lloydminster, Saskatchewan, Nov. 23–26	(Saskatchewan) Sherry Anderson	(China) Liu Sijia	$23,200	$6,500	4.6817
15	The Sunova Spiel at East St. Paul; East St. Paul, Manitoba, Nov. 23–26	(Manitoba) Joelle Brown	(Manitoba) Abby Ackland	$10,500	$2,900	3.5570
15	Spitfire Arms Cash Spiel; Windsor, Nova Scotia, Nov. 23–25	(New Brunswick) Sylvie Robichaud	(Prince Edward Island) Suzanne Birt	$13,000	$4,000	3.6687
16	Curl Mesabi Classic; Eveleth, United States, Nov. 30 – Dec. 2	(Ontario) Krista McCarville	(Quebec) Laurie St-Georges	$19,903	$5,307	3.8971
17	Home Hardware Canada Cup of Curling; Estevan, Saskatchewan, Dec. 5–9	(Manitoba) Jennifer Jones	(Manitoba) Kerri Einarson	$70,000	$21,500	11.6184
17	Curling World Cup Omaha; Omaha, United States, Dec. 5–9	(Japan) Satsuki Fujisawa	(South Korea) Kim Min-ji			7.5361
17	WFG Jim Sullivan Curling Classic; Saint John, New Brunswick, Dec. 7–9	(Prince Edward Island) Suzanne Birt	(New Brunswick) Andrea Crawford	$8,250	$2,000	2.1884
17	CCT City of Perth Ladies International; Perth, Scotland, Dec. 6–9	(Switzerland) Ursi Hegner	(Switzerland) Irene Schori	$17,803	$7,630	2.8493
17	MCT Championships; Morris, Manitoba, Dec. 7–9	(Manitoba) Beth Peterson	(Manitoba) Alyssa Calvert	$3,700	$1,300	3.0778
18	**Boost National**; Conception Bay South, Newfoundland and Labrador, Dec. 11–16	(Ontario) Rachel Homan	(Manitoba) Kerri Einarson	$100,000	$30,000	11.7432
18	Dakota Challenger Spiel; Lakeville, Minnesota, Dec. 14–16	(United States) Kim Rhyme	(United States) Ann Podoll	$2,802	$1,116	1.3199
19	Schweizer Cup; Biel, Switzerland	(Switzerland) Silvana Tirinzoni	(Switzerland) Elena Stern	$15,316	$6,962	5.6953
19	Karuizawa International; Karuizawa, Japan, Dec. 20–23	(Russia) Anna Sidorova	(Japan) Sayaka Yoshimura	$48,907	$15,894	4.3206
19	Qinghai Curling Elite; Xining, China, Dec. 14–19	(Germany) Daniela Jentsch	(Russia) Alina Kovaleva	$30,000 (US)	$20,078	3.7240
20	Russian Curling Cup; Krasnoyarsk, Russia, Dec. 21–25	(Russia) Alina Kovaleva	(Russia) Ekaterina Galkina	$18,000	$8,000	2.5343
22	**Meridian Canadian Open**; North Battleford, Saskatchewan, Jan. 8–13	(Ontario) Rachel Homan	(Switzerland) Silvana Tirinzoni	$100,000	$30,000	12.0656
22	International Bernese Ladies Cup; Bern, Switzerland, Jan. 10–13	(Russia) Anna Sidorova	(China) Jiang Yilun	$27,629	$8,086	4.9291
23	Glynhill Ladies International; Glasgow, Scotland, Jan. 17–20	(Switzerland) Ursi Hegner	(Switzerland) Elena Stern	$17,452	$6,980	4.8003
25	Curling World Cup Jönköping; Jönköping, Sweden, Jan. 30 – Feb. 3	(South Korea) Kim Min-ji	(Sweden) Anna Hasselborg			6.3070
26	Teulon MJCT Women's Spiel; Teulon, Manitoba, Feb. 8–10	(Manitoba) Victoria Beaudry	(Manitoba) Cassandra Stobbe			
35	**Players' Championship**; Toronto, Ontario, Apr. 9–14	(Manitoba) Kerri Einarson	(Sweden) Anna Hasselborg	$100,000	$30,000	11.2372
37	**Humpty's Champions Cup**; Saskatoon, Saskatchewan, Apr. 23–28	(Switzerland) Silvana Tirinzoni	(Manitoba) Kerri Einarson	$150,000	$40,000	10.1525
39	Curling World Cup Grand Final; Beijing, China, May 8–12	(Manitoba) Jennifer Jones	(Switzerland) Silvana Tirinzoni			8.4741
41	WCT Arctic Cup; Dudinka, Russia, May 22–27	(Scotland) Eve Muirhead	(Russia) Alina Kovaleva	$50,000		5.7292

=== Mixed doubles events ===
Week	Event	Winning pair	Runner-up pair	Purse (CAD)	Winner's share (CAD)	SFM
3	Audi quattro Winter Games NZ; Naseby, New Zealand, Aug. 26 – 30	(Ontario) Jones / Laing	(Scotland) Stirling / Kingan			
3	Battleford Mixed Doubles Fall Curling Classic; North Battleford, Saskatchewan, Aug. 31 – Sept. 3	(Manitoba) Peterman / (Newfoundland and Labrador) Gallant	(Alberta) Walker / (Saskatchewan) Muyres	$13,500		
4	Oberstdorf International Mixed Doubles Cup; Oberstdorf, Germany, Sept. 6–9	(Sweden) Heldin / Lindström	(Czech Republic) Paulová / Paul	€3,200		
6	WCT Tallinn Mixed Doubles International; Tallinn, Estonia, Sept. 21–23	(Switzerland) Perret / Rios	(Norway) Skaslien / Nedregotten	€1,200		
9	Sherwood Park Mixed Doubles Classic; Edmonton, Alberta, Oct. 12–14	(Alberta) Homan / Kennedy	(Alberta) Sauder / Donnelly	$4,000		
10	WCT Austrian Mixed Doubles Cup; Kitzbühel, Austria, Oct. 19–22	(Quebec) R. Desjardins / É. Desjardins	(Scotland) Aitken / Andrews	€3,500	$1,202	
11	WCT Mixed Doubles Cup Geising; Geising, Germany, Oct. 25–28	(Russia) Komarova / Goriachev	(Russia) Biktimirova / Gazhikhanov	€3,500	$1,940	
12	MadTown DoubleDown; Madison, Wisconsin, Nov. 2 – 4	(United States) Walker / Leichter	(Manitoba) Birchard / (Saskatchewan) Schneider	$26,211	$8,518	
12	Palmerston Mixed Doubles Spiel; Palmerston, Ontario, Nov. 3 – 4	(Ontario) Berlett / Dow	(Ontario) Gebhardt / Fairfull	$750		
12	Norway Open Mixed Doubles; Hedmarken, Norway Nov. 2 – 4	(Denmark) Jensen / Berger	(Sweden) Wendel / Wingfors	NOK 10,000		
13	International Mixed Doubles Sochi; Sochi, Russia, Nov. 8–11	(Scotland) Aitken / Andrews	(Russia) Komarova / Goriachev	$10,000		
14	Mixed Doubles Bern; Bern, Switzerland, Nov. 16–18	(Switzerland) Albrecht / (Manitoba) Wozniak	(Switzerland) Perret / Rios	CHF 10,000		
14	Canad Inns Mixed Doubles Championship; Portage la Prairie, Manitoba, Nov. 16 – 19	(Manitoba) Lawes / (Alberta) Morris	(Manitoba) Sahaidak / Lott	$26,000		
15	Ilderton Mixed Doubles Spiel; Ilderton, Ontario, Nov. 24 – 25	(Ontario) Greenman / Zuliani	(Ontario) K. Tuck / W. Tuck	$3,500		
15	Twin Ports Mixed Doubles Classic; Duluth, Minnesota, Nov. 23 – 25	(United States) Persinger / Plys	(United States) Peterson / Polo	$12,000 (US)		
16	Mixed Doubles Łódź; Łódź, Poland, Nov. 29 – Dec. 2	(Scotland) J. McCleary / L. McCleary	(Finland) Virtaala / Rantamäki	€2,800		
16	Bele Wranå Memorial; Sundbyberg, Sweden, Nov. 30 – Dec. 2	(Sweden) C. Noreen / P. Noreen	(Sweden) Monika Wranå / Mats Wranå	SEK 10,000		
17	Sutherland Mixed Doubles Curling Classic; Saskatoon, Saskatchewan, Dec. 7 – 10	(Saskatchewan) J. Lang / M. Lang	(Saskatchewan) Martin / Jacobson	$13,500		
19	Italian Mixed Doubles Cup; Pinerolo, Italy, Dec. 20 – Dec. 23	(England) A. Fowler / B. Fowler	(Italy) Romei / Retornaz	€3,000		
20	Southern Mixed Doubles; Charlotte, North Carolina, Dec. 28–30	(United States) M. Stolt / P. Slolt	(United States) C. Shaw / M. Shaw	$3,400 (US)		
21	Qualico Mixed Doubles Classic; Canmore & Banff, Alberta, Jan. 3 – 6	(United States) Anderson / Dropkin	(Manitoba) Peterman / (Newfoundland and Labrador) Gallant	$29,000	$10,000	
22	WCT Dutch Masters Mixed Doubles; Zoetermeer, Netherlands, Jan. 11–13	(Czech Republic) Paulová / Paul	(Russia) Venevtseva / Groshev	€1,250		
22	Callie Mixed Doubles Classic; Regina, Saskatchewan, Jan. 11 – 14	(Saskatchewan) Campbell / (Alberta) Morris	(Scotland) Stirling / Kingan	$13,500		
23	Toronto Cricket Mixed Doubles Championship; Toronto, Ontario, Jan. 18–20	(Saskatchewan) Martin / (British Columbia) Griffith	(Manitoba) Groff / Doering			
24	Gefle Mixed Doubles Cup; Gävle, Sweden, Jan. 24–27	(Switzerland) Perret / Rios	(Sweden) C. Noreen / P. Noreen	SEK 3,600		
24	Saguenay Mixed Doubles Challenger; Chicoutimi, Quebec, Jan. 25 – 27	(Quebec) R. Desjardins / É. Desjardins	(Quebec) Lavoie / Fortier	$1,280		
25	Oshawa Mixed Doubles Cash Spiel; Oshawa, Ontario, Feb. 1–2	(Ontario) Greenman / Zuliani	(Ontario) Miller / Adair			
26	International Mixed Doubles Trophy Aarau; Aarau, Switzerland, Feb. 8 – 10	(Hungary) Nagy / Szekeres	(Russia) Eremin / Moskaleva	CHF 7,000		
26	Listowel Mixed Doubles Cashspiel; Listowel, Ontario, Feb. 8 – 10	(Ontario) K. Tuck / W. Tuck	(Ontario) Thompson / Lowe	$9,000		
27	WCT Tallinn Masters Mixed Doubles; Tallinn, Estonia, Feb. 15–17	(Russia) Moskaleva / Eremin	(Estonia) Turmann / Lill	€1,250		
27	Nutana Mixed Doubles Classic; Saskatoon, Saskatchewan, Feb. 15 – 18	(Norway) Skaslien / Nedregotten	(Saskatchewan) Just / Kalthoff	$13,500		
28	Slovakia Mixed Doubles Curling Cup; Bratislava, Slovakia, Feb. 21–24	(Hungary) Palancsa / Kiss	(Poland) Szeliga-Frynia / Frynia	€2,800		
29	International Mixed Doubles Sochi 2 Sochi, Russia, Feb. 21 – 24	(Russia) Polikarpova / Karetnikov	(Russia) Biktimirova / Gadzhikhanov	$10,000		
29	Paf Åland Mixed Doubles Cup; Åland, Finland, Mar. 1 – 3	(Sweden) Westman / Ahlberg	(Denmark) Jensen / Berger	€1,800		
31	Westbay Hungarian Mixed Doubles Cup; Budapest, Hungary, Mar. 14 – 17	(Russia) Moskaleva / Eremin	(Hungary) Palancsa / Kiss	€3,100		
32	International Mixed Doubles Dumfries; Dumfries, Scotland, Mar. 21 – 24	(Norway) Ramsfjell / McFadzean	(Scotland) Stirling / Kingan	£5,200		
34	LODE Latvian Mixed Doubles Curling Cup 1 Riga, Latvia, Apr. 4 – 7	(Russia) Moskaleva / Eremin	(China) Liu / Hao	€1,000		
35	LODE Latvian Mixed Doubles Curling Cup 2 Riga, Latvia, Apr. 11 – 14	(China) Fu / Zou	(Czech Republic) Paulová / Paul	€1,000		

== WCT rankings ==
Men

After week 39
#	Skip	YTD	OOM
1	(Alberta) Kevin Koe	512.335	512.335
2	(Alberta) Brendan Bottcher	494.059	494.059
3	(Sweden) Niklas Edin	412.513	412.513
4	(Ontario) Brad Jacobs	405.981	405.981
5	(Scotland) Bruce Mouat	378.002	378.002
6	(Ontario) John Epping	362.112	362.112
7	(Scotland) Ross Paterson	344.822	344.822
8	(Switzerland) Peter de Cruz	340.624	340.624
9	(Newfoundland and Labrador) Brad Gushue	336.934	336.934
10	(Ontario) Glenn Howard	294.350	294.350

Women

After week 39
#	Skip	YTD	OOM
1	(Ontario) Rachel Homan	529.714	529.714
2	(Manitoba) Kerri Einarson	496.956	496.956
3	(Sweden) Anna Hasselborg	486.210	486.210
4	(Switzerland) Silvana Tirinzoni	475.537	475.537
5	(Manitoba) Jennifer Jones	362.647	362.647
6	(Alberta) Chelsea Carey	323.572	323.572
7	(Alberta) Casey Scheidegger	276.423	276.423
8	(Saskatchewan) Robyn Silvernagle	274.664	274.664
9	(Japan) Satsuki Fujisawa	273.581	273.581
10	(Manitoba) Tracy Fleury	259.809	259.809

=== Money list ===
Men

As of May 29
#	Skip	$ (CAD)
1	(Alberta) Kevin Koe	$220,861
2	(Alberta) Brendan Bottcher	$159,000
3	(Sweden) Niklas Edin	$157,841
4	(Newfoundland and Labrador) Brad Gushue	$131,776
5	(Saskatchewan) Matt Dunstone	$119,755
6	(Scotland) Ross Paterson	$112,472
7	(Ontario) Brad Jacobs	$108,500
8	(Ontario) John Epping	$105,350
9	(Scotland) Bruce Mouat	$92,650
10	(United States) John Shuster	$83,814

Women

As of May 29
#	Skip	$ (CAD)
1	(Ontario) Rachel Homan	$181,848
2	(Sweden) Anna Hasselborg	$180,629
3	(Manitoba) Kerri Einarson	$150,704
4	(Switzerland) Silvana Tirinzoni	$148,725
5	(Russia) Alina Kovaleva	$131,592
6	(Manitoba) Jennifer Jones	$115,233
7	(Japan) Satsuki Fujisawa	$98,605
8	(South Korea) Kim Min-ji	$89,695
9	(Russia) Anna Sidorova	$74,257
10	(Alberta) Casey Scheidegger	$70,500

== Notes ==
Preceded by 2017–18	2018–19 curling season August 2018 – May 2019	Succeeded by 2019–20
