= 2021 Qualico Mixed Doubles Classic =

- Host city: Banff & Canmore, Alberta
- Arena: Banff Curling Club & Canmore Curling Club
- Dates: September 30 – October 3
- Winner: (Alberta) Homan/Morris
- Female: Rachel Homan
- Male: John Morris
- Finalist: (Manitoba) (Newfoundland and Labrador) Peterman / Gallant

The 2021 Qualico Mixed Doubles Classic (QMDC21) was held from September 30 to October 3, 2021 at the Banff and Canmore curling clubs in Banff and Canmore, Alberta. The bonspiel was a mixed doubles curling tournament, and was held in a round-robin format with a $30,000 purse. The event was the third edition of the annual Qualico Mixed Doubles Classic. Many of the top Canadian curlers were featured at this event, as it served as one of three direct-entry qualifiers to the 2022 Canadian Mixed Doubles Curling Olympic Trials. The highest qualifying Canadian team that placed in top four qualified for the trials.

== Teams ==
The teams are listed as follows:

Female	Male	Locale
Sarah Anderson	Korey Dropkin	(United States) Duluth, Minnesota
Shannon Birchard	Catlin Schneider	Winnipeg, Manitoba / White City, Saskatchewan
Kira Brunton	Brett Lyon-Hatcher	Ottawa, Ontario
Chelsea Carey	Colin Hodgson	Calgary, Alberta / Red Lake, Ontario
Jaelyn Cotter	Jim Cotter	Vernon, British Columbia
Joanne Courtney	Darren Moulding	Edmonton, Alberta
Émilie Desjardins	Robert Desjardins	Saguenay, Quebec
Tahli Gill	Dean Hewitt	Brisbane, Australia
Clancy Grandy	Pat Janssen	Pickering, Ontario
Rachel Homan	John Morris	Canmore, Alberta
Jennifer Jones	Brent Laing	Barrie, Ontario
Sherry Just	Ryan Deis	Prince Albert, Saskatchewan
Chaelynn Kitz	Brayden Stewart	Maryfield, Saskatchewan
Madison Kleiter	Steve Laycock (Note: Steve Laycock replaced Rylan Kleiter.)	Saskatoon, Saskatchewan
Catherine Liscumb	Chris Liscumb	Ilderton, Ontario
Nancy Martin	Tyrel Griffith	Saskatoon, Saskatchewan / Kelowna, British Columbia
Taylor McDonald	Geoff Walker	Edmonton, Alberta
Emma Miskew	Ryan Fry	Ottawa, Ontario
Becky Moncur	Scott Moncur	Canmore, Alberta
Alyssa Nedohin	David Nedohin	Sherwood Park, Alberta
Selena Njegovan	Reid Carruthers	Winnipeg, Manitoba
Jocelyn Peterman	Brett Gallant	Winnipeg, Manitoba / St. John's, Newfoundland and Labrador
Tabitha Peterson	Joe Polo	(United States) Chaska, Minnesota
Ashley Quick	Mike Armstrong	Saskatoon, Saskatchewan
Kelsey Rocque	Braden Calvert	Edmonton, Alberta / Winnipeg, Manitoba
Kadriana Sahaidak	Colton Lott	Winnipeg Beach, Manitoba
Jennifer Sashkiw	Shane Coutis	Banff, Alberta
Bobbie Sauder	Brendan Bottcher	Spruce Grove, Alberta
Danielle Schmiemann	Jason Ginter	Edmonton, Alberta
Kayla Skrlik	Gregg Hamilton	Calgary, Alberta
Selena Sturmay	Karsten Sturmay	Edmonton, Alberta
Val Sweeting	Marc Kennedy	Edmonton, Alberta
Brittany Tran	Tyler Powell (Note: Tyler Powell replaced Aaron Sluchinski.)	Calgary, Alberta
Laura Walker	Kirk Muyres	Edmonton, Alberta / Regina, Saskatchewan
Lisa Weagle	John Epping	Toronto, Ontario
Sarah Wilkes	Brad Thiessen	Edmonton, Alberta

== Round-robin standings ==
Final round-robin standings

Key
Teams to Playoffs

Pool A	W	L
(Manitoba) (Newfoundland and Labrador) Peterman / Gallant	4	1
(Saskatchewan) Just / Deis	4	1
(Quebec) Desjardins / Desjardins	3	2
(Australia) Gill / Hewitt	3	2
(Ontario) Grandy / Janssen	1	4
(Alberta) Sashkiw / Coutis	0	5

Pool D	W	L
(Ontario) Weagle / Epping	5	0
(Saskatchewan) (British Columbia) Martin / Griffith	3	2
(Alberta) (Saskatchewan) Walker / Muyres	3	2
(British Columbia) Cotter / Cotter	2	3
(Ontario) Liscumb / Liscumb	1	4
(Alberta) Tran / Powell	1	4

Pool B	W	L
(United States) Anderson / Dropkin	5	0
(Alberta) Sweeting / Kennedy	4	1
(Alberta) Courtney / Moulding	3	2
(Alberta) (Manitoba) Rocque / Calvert	2	3
(Alberta) (Ontario) Carey / Hodgson	1	4
(Alberta) Moncur / Moncur	0	5

Pool E	W	L
(Manitoba) (Saskatchewan) Birchard / Schneider	4	1
(Alberta) Sturmay / Sturmay	3	2
(Ontario) Miskew / Fry	3	2
(Alberta) Sauder / Bottcher	2	3
(Alberta) Nedohin / Nedohin	2	3
(Alberta) Wilkes / Thiessen	1	4

Pool C	W	L
(Manitoba) Sahaidak / Lott	3	2
(Ontario) Jones / Laing	3	2
(United States) Peterson / Polo	3	2
(Alberta) McDonald / Walker	3	2
(Ontario) Brunton / Lyon-Hatcher	2	3
(Saskatchewan) Kitz / Stewart	1	4

Pool F	W	L
(Alberta) Homan / Morris	5	0
(Manitoba) Njegovan / Carruthers	4	1
(Alberta) Schmiemann / Ginter	3	2
(Saskatchewan) Quick / Armstrong	2	3
(Saskatchewan) Kleiter / Laycock	1	4
(Alberta) Skrlik / Hamilton	0	5

== Round-robin results ==
All draw times are listed in Mountain Time (UTC−06:00).
Note: Sheets B 1 through 4 are at the Banff Curling Club. Sheets C 1 through 4 are at the Canmore Curling Club.

=== Draw 1 ===
Thursday, September 30, 2:00 pm

Sheet B1	1	2	3	4	5	6	7	8	Final
(Alberta) Moncur / Moncur	1	0	2	0	1	0	1	0	5
(United States) Anderson / Dropkin 🔨	0	5	0	3	0	1	0	1	10

Sheet B2	1	2	3	4	5	6	7	8	Final
(Alberta) (Saskatchewan) Walker / Muyres 🔨	4	1	4	0	2	X	X	X	11
(Alberta) Tran / Powell	0	0	0	2	0	X	X	X	2

Sheet B3	1	2	3	4	5	6	7	8	Final
(Ontario) Weagle / Epping 🔨	2	0	6	1	2	0	X	X	11
(Ontario) Liscumb / Liscumb	0	2	0	0	0	4	X	X	6

Sheet B4	1	2	3	4	5	6	7	8	Final
(Alberta) Sashkiw / Coutis	0	0	1	0	0	0	X	X	1
(Manitoba) (Newfoundland and Labrador) Peterman / Gallant 🔨	5	2	0	1	1	1	X	X	10

Sheet C1	1	2	3	4	5	6	7	8	Final
(Alberta) Sweeting / Kennedy	0	2	0	2	0	1	3	1	9
(Alberta) (Ontario) Carey / Hodgson 🔨	1	0	2	0	2	0	0	0	5

Sheet C2	1	2	3	4	5	6	7	8	Final
(Alberta) Courtney / Moulding 🔨	3	0	2	0	1	1	0	X	7
(Alberta) (Manitoba) Rocque / Calvert	0	1	0	1	0	0	1	X	3

Sheet C3	1	2	3	4	5	6	7	8	Final
(British Columbia) Cotter / Cotter 🔨	0	0	1	0	2	0	0	X	3
(Saskatchewan) (British Columbia) Martin / Griffith	4	1	0	1	0	1	1	X	8

Sheet C4	1	2	3	4	5	6	7	8	Final
(Ontario) Grandy / Janssen	0	0	5	0	1	1	0	0	7
(Saskatchewan) Just / Deis 🔨	2	3	0	1	0	0	2	1	9

=== Draw 2 ===
Thursday, September 30, 4:30 pm

Sheet B1	1	2	3	4	5	6	7	8	Final
(Quebec) Desjardins / Desjardins 🔨	4	1	2	0	2	X	X	X	9
(Australia) Gill / Hewitt	0	0	0	1	0	X	X	X	1

Sheet B2	1	2	3	4	5	6	7	8	Final
(Manitoba) Sahaidak / Lott	1	0	0	0	0	2	1	0	4
(Alberta) McDonald / Walker 🔨	0	1	1	1	1	0	0	1	5

Sheet B3	1	2	3	4	5	6	7	8	Final
(Alberta) Schmiemann / Ginter	0	1	0	1	0	1	0	X	3
(Manitoba) Njegovan / Carruthers 🔨	1	0	2	0	2	0	4	X	9

Sheet B4	1	2	3	4	5	6	7	8	Final
(Saskatchewan) Kitz / Stewart 🔨	0	1	0	1	0	1	0	X	3
(United States) Peterson / Polo	2	0	2	0	1	0	2	X	7

Sheet C1	1	2	3	4	5	6	7	8	Final
(Alberta) Skrlik / Hamilton	0	0	2	2	0	1	0	X	5
(Alberta) Homan / Morris 🔨	3	3	0	0	2	0	3	X	11

Sheet C2	1	2	3	4	5	6	7	8	Final
(Saskatchewan) Quick / Armstrong 🔨	1	0	0	4	0	2	3	0	10
(Saskatchewan) Kleiter / Laycock	0	2	1	0	4	0	0	1	8

Sheet C3	1	2	3	4	5	6	7	8	Final
(Ontario) Brunton / Lyon-Hatcher	1	0	2	1	2	2	X	X	8
(Ontario) Jones / Laing 🔨	0	1	0	0	0	0	X	X	1

Sheet C4	1	2	3	4	5	6	7	8	Final
(Alberta) Nedohin / Nedohin	0	0	0	1	0	2	0	X	3
(Manitoba) (Saskatchewan) Birchard / Schneider 🔨	3	2	1	0	1	0	1	X	8

=== Draw 3 ===
Thursday, September 30, 7:00 pm

Sheet B1	1	2	3	4	5	6	7	8	Final
(Alberta) Sauder / Bottcher	1	0	1	0	0	0	2	0	4
(Alberta) Sturmay / Sturmay 🔨	0	1	0	2	1	1	0	1	6

Sheet B2	1	2	3	4	5	6	7	8	Final
(Ontario) Miskew / Fry 🔨	3	0	3	0	1	0	2	X	9
(Alberta) Wilkes / Thiessen	0	3	0	2	0	1	0	X	6

Sheet B3	1	2	3	4	5	6	7	8	Final
(United States) Anderson / Dropkin 🔨	0	3	0	0	1	0	6	X	10
(Alberta) Courtney / Moulding	1	0	1	2	0	1	0	X	5

Sheet B4	1	2	3	4	5	6	7	8	9	Final
(Alberta) (Ontario) Carey / Hodgson	1	0	0	0	0	1	2	2	0	6
(Alberta) (Manitoba) Rocque / Calvert 🔨	0	2	1	2	1	0	0	0	1	7

Sheet C1	1	2	3	4	5	6	7	8	Final
(British Columbia) Cotter / Cotter	0	0	1	1	2	1	0	X	5
(Alberta) (Saskatchewan) Walker / Muyres 🔨	3	2	0	0	0	0	4	X	9

Sheet C2	1	2	3	4	5	6	7	8	Final
(Saskatchewan) (British Columbia) Martin / Griffith 🔨	0	4	0	0	0	1	X	X	5
(Ontario) Weagle / Epping	2	0	5	1	3	0	X	X	11

Sheet C3	1	2	3	4	5	6	7	8	Final
(Alberta) Tran / Powell 🔨	1	0	0	0	2	0	2	1	6
(Ontario) Liscumb / Liscumb	0	2	1	3	0	2	0	0	8

Sheet C4	1	2	3	4	5	6	7	8	Final
(Alberta) Moncur / Moncur	0	0	0	0	0	X	X	X	0
(Alberta) Sweeting / Kennedy 🔨	1	2	1	2	3	X	X	X	9

=== Draw 4 ===
Friday, October 1, 9:00 am

Sheet B1	1	2	3	4	5	6	7	8	9	Final
(Alberta) Skrlik / Hamilton 🔨	0	0	1	0	0	1	0	3	0	5
(Saskatchewan) Quick / Armstrong	1	1	0	1	1	0	1	0	1	6

Sheet B2	1	2	3	4	5	6	7	8	Final
(Alberta) Sashkiw / Coutis	0	0	0	0	3	0	0	X	3
(Ontario) Grandy / Janssen 🔨	1	1	1	3	0	1	1	X	8

Sheet B3	1	2	3	4	5	6	7	8	Final
(Manitoba) (Newfoundland and Labrador) Peterman / Gallant 🔨	1	1	0	4	0	1	X	X	7
(Quebec) Desjardins / Desjardins	0	0	1	0	1	0	X	X	2

Sheet B4	1	2	3	4	5	6	7	8	Final
(Saskatchewan) Just / Deis	1	0	3	1	0	1	0	2	8
(Australia) Gill / Hewitt 🔨	0	1	0	0	2	0	2	0	5

Sheet C1	1	2	3	4	5	6	7	8	Final
(Ontario) Brunton / Lyon-Hatcher	2	1	0	2	0	0	0	2	7
(Manitoba) Sahaidak / Lott 🔨	0	0	2	0	2	1	1	0	6

Sheet C2	1	2	3	4	5	6	7	8	Final
(Ontario) Jones / Laing 🔨	3	0	2	0	1	0	2	X	8
(Saskatchewan) Kitz / Stewart	0	1	0	2	0	1	0	X	4

Sheet C3	1	2	3	4	5	6	7	8	Final
(Alberta) McDonald / Walker	0	0	0	0	0	X	X	X	0
(United States) Peterson / Polo 🔨	1	2	1	1	4	X	X	X	9

Sheet C4	1	2	3	4	5	6	7	8	Final
(Alberta) Homan / Morris	2	0	1	0	3	0	4	X	10
(Alberta) Schmiemann / Ginter 🔨	0	2	0	1	0	1	0	X	4

=== Draw 5 ===
Friday, October 1, 11:30 am

Sheet B1	1	2	3	4	5	6	7	8	Final
(Saskatchewan) Kleiter / Laycock	0	3	0	0	0	1	1	0	5
(Manitoba) Njegovan / Carruthers 🔨	1	0	2	1	1	0	0	1	6

Sheet B2	1	2	3	4	5	6	7	8	Final
(Alberta) Nedohin / Nedohin	1	0	0	0	0	0	X	X	1
(Alberta) Sauder / Bottcher 🔨	0	2	1	3	1	1	X	X	8

Sheet B3	1	2	3	4	5	6	7	8	Final
(Manitoba) (Saskatchewan) Birchard / Schneider 🔨	0	2	0	2	0	1	1	0	6
(Ontario) Miskew / Fry	1	0	1	0	4	0	0	3	9

Sheet B4	1	2	3	4	5	6	7	8	Final
(Alberta) Sturmay / Sturmay	0	1	1	0	1	0	0	X	3
(Alberta) Wilkes / Thiessen 🔨	5	0	0	1	0	2	1	X	9

Sheet C1	1	2	3	4	5	6	7	8	Final
(Saskatchewan) (British Columbia) Martin / Griffith 🔨	1	1	0	1	2	0	3	X	8
(Ontario) Liscumb / Liscumb	0	0	2	0	0	1	0	X	3

Sheet C2	1	2	3	4	5	6	7	8	Final
(Alberta) Moncur / Moncur	0	1	0	1	0	X	X	X	2
(Alberta) (Ontario) Carey / Hodgson 🔨	4	0	1	0	4	X	X	X	9

Sheet C3	1	2	3	4	5	6	7	8	Final
(Alberta) (Saskatchewan) Walker / Muyres 🔨	2	0	0	1	0	0	1	X	4
(Ontario) Weagle / Epping	0	1	2	0	3	1	0	X	7

Sheet C4	1	2	3	4	5	6	7	8	Final
(British Columbia) Cotter / Cotter 🔨	2	1	0	0	3	0	2	X	8
(Alberta) Tran / Powell	0	0	1	1	0	1	0	X	3

=== Draw 6 ===
Friday, October 1, 2:00 pm

Sheet B1	1	2	3	4	5	6	7	8	Final
(Manitoba) Sahaidak / Lott 🔨	1	0	0	1	0	3	0	3	8
(Saskatchewan) Kitz / Stewart	0	2	1	0	1	0	1	0	5

Sheet B2	1	2	3	4	5	6	7	8	Final
(Alberta) Sweeting / Kennedy 🔨	4	0	2	0	2	0	0	X	8
(Alberta) Courtney / Moulding	0	2	0	2	0	1	2	X	7

Sheet B3	1	2	3	4	5	6	7	8	Final
(Ontario) Jones / Laing	0	0	1	1	2	1	3	X	8
(United States) Peterson / Polo 🔨	1	1	0	0	0	0	0	X	2

Sheet B4	1	2	3	4	5	6	7	8	Final
(Ontario) Brunton / Lyon-Hatcher 🔨	0	0	1	0	0	5	0	X	6
(Alberta) McDonald / Walker	4	1	0	2	1	0	3	X	11

Sheet C1	1	2	3	4	5	6	7	8	Final
(Alberta) Sashkiw / Coutis	0	0	1	0	3	1	0	X	5
(Saskatchewan) Just / Deis 🔨	2	2	0	1	0	0	5	X	10

Sheet C2	1	2	3	4	5	6	7	8	9	Final
(Manitoba) (Newfoundland and Labrador) Peterman / Gallant 🔨	1	0	1	0	3	0	1	0	0	6
(Australia) Gill / Hewitt	0	1	0	1	0	2	0	2	1	7

Sheet C3	1	2	3	4	5	6	7	8	Final
(Ontario) Grandy / Janssen 🔨	0	0	1	0	0	3	0	X	4
(Quebec) Desjardins / Desjardins	1	1	0	1	2	0	3	X	8

Sheet C4	1	2	3	4	5	6	7	8	Final
(United States) Anderson / Dropkin	0	0	0	2	2	0	3	1	8
(Alberta) (Manitoba) Rocque / Calvert 🔨	1	1	1	0	0	1	0	0	4

=== Draw 7 ===
Friday, October 1, 4:30 pm

Sheet B1	1	2	3	4	5	6	7	8	Final
(British Columbia) Cotter / Cotter 🔨	1	0	1	0	0	2	0	X	4
(Ontario) Weagle / Epping	0	3	0	1	1	0	4	X	9

Sheet B2	1	2	3	4	5	6	7	8	Final
(Saskatchewan) Quick / Armstrong	0	0	0	1	0	X	X	X	1
(Alberta) Schmiemann / Ginter 🔨	4	4	1	0	3	X	X	X	12

Sheet B3	1	2	3	4	5	6	7	8	9	Final
(Alberta) Homan / Morris 🔨	1	0	1	1	1	0	2	0	1	7
(Manitoba) Njegovan / Carruthers	0	3	0	0	0	1	0	2	0	6

Sheet B4	1	2	3	4	5	6	7	8	Final
(Saskatchewan) (British Columbia) Martin / Griffith	0	1	0	0	0	X	X	X	1
(Alberta) Tran / Powell 🔨	3	0	6	1	1	X	X	X	11

Sheet C1	1	2	3	4	5	6	7	8	Final
(Alberta) Sauder / Bottcher	1	0	0	0	1	0	X	X	2
(Ontario) Miskew / Fry 🔨	0	2	1	3	0	1	X	X	7

Sheet C2	1	2	3	4	5	6	7	8	Final
(Manitoba) (Saskatchewan) Birchard / Schneider	1	0	1	0	1	2	0	3	8
(Alberta) Wilkes / Thiessen 🔨	0	1	0	2	0	0	4	0	7

Sheet C3	1	2	3	4	5	6	7	8	Final
(Alberta) Nedohin / Nedohin 🔨	1	0	0	1	0	1	0	X	3
(Alberta) Sturmay / Sturmay	0	2	2	0	1	0	3	X	8

Sheet C4	1	2	3	4	5	6	7	8	Final
(Alberta) Skrlik / Hamilton 🔨	5	0	3	0	0	0	1	0	9
(Saskatchewan) Kleiter / Laycock	0	3	0	3	1	1	0	2	10

=== Draw 8 ===
Friday, October 1, 7:00 pm

Sheet B1	1	2	3	4	5	6	7	8	Final
(Alberta) (Saskatchewan) Walker / Muyres 🔨	3	0	2	0	2	0	1	X	8
(Ontario) Liscumb / Liscumb	0	1	0	1	0	1	0	X	3

Sheet B2	1	2	3	4	5	6	7	8	Final
(United States) Anderson / Dropkin	1	1	0	0	3	1	0	X	6
(Alberta) (Ontario) Carey / Hodgson 🔨	0	0	1	1	0	0	2	X	4

Sheet B3	1	2	3	4	5	6	7	8	Final
(Alberta) Sweeting / Kennedy 🔨	2	1	0	0	0	4	3	X	10
(Alberta) (Manitoba) Rocque / Calvert	0	0	1	1	2	0	0	X	4

Sheet B4	1	2	3	4	5	6	7	8	Final
(Alberta) Moncur / Moncur	0	0	0	0	3	X	X	X	3
(Alberta) Courtney / Moulding 🔨	1	2	3	1	0	X	X	X	7

Sheet C1	1	2	3	4	5	6	7	8	Final
(Ontario) Grandy / Janssen 🔨	2	0	0	1	0	2	1	0	6
(Australia) Gill / Hewitt	0	1	2	0	2	0	0	3	8

Sheet C2	1	2	3	4	5	6	7	8	Final
(Alberta) Sashkiw / Coutis	0	0	2	0	3	0	0	X	5
(Quebec) Desjardins / Desjardins 🔨	1	1	0	1	0	4	2	X	9

Sheet C3	1	2	3	4	5	6	7	8	Final
(Manitoba) (Newfoundland and Labrador) Peterman / Gallant	0	1	2	1	1	2	0	X	7
(Saskatchewan) Just / Deis 🔨	2	0	0	0	0	0	1	X	3

Sheet C4	1	2	3	4	5	6	7	8	Final
(Ontario) Brunton / Lyon-Hatcher	0	0	2	0	1	0	2	X	5
(Saskatchewan) Kitz / Stewart 🔨	4	2	0	2	0	1	0	X	9

=== Draw 9 ===
Saturday, October 2, 9:00 am

Sheet B1	1	2	3	4	5	6	7	8	Final
(Ontario) Jones / Laing	1	1	0	0	1	1	3	X	7
(Alberta) McDonald / Walker 🔨	0	0	2	1	0	0	0	X	3

Sheet B2	1	2	3	4	5	6	7	8	Final
(Manitoba) (Saskatchewan) Birchard / Schneider 🔨	0	5	3	1	X	X	X	X	9
(Alberta) Sturmay / Sturmay	1	0	0	0	X	X	X	X	1

Sheet B3	1	2	3	4	5	6	7	8	Final
(Alberta) Sauder / Bottcher 🔨	1	0	3	0	3	1	0	2	10
(Alberta) Wilkes / Thiessen	0	5	0	1	0	0	2	0	8

Sheet B4	1	2	3	4	5	6	7	8	Final
(Alberta) Nedohin / Nedohin 🔨	1	0	3	0	3	1	X	X	8
(Ontario) Miskew / Fry	0	1	0	1	0	0	X	X	2

Sheet C1	1	2	3	4	5	6	7	8	Final
(Saskatchewan) Quick / Armstrong 🔨	0	0	1	0	2	0	0	X	3
(Manitoba) Njegovan / Carruthers	2	1	0	1	0	1	1	X	6

Sheet C2	1	2	3	4	5	6	7	8	Final
(Alberta) Skrlik / Hamilton 🔨	2	0	2	1	0	1	0	X	6
(Alberta) Schmiemann / Ginter	0	1	0	0	3	0	5	X	9

Sheet C3	1	2	3	4	5	6	7	8	Final
(Alberta) Homan / Morris 🔨	1	0	0	2	2	0	4	X	9
(Saskatchewan) Kleiter / Laycock	0	1	4	0	0	1	0	X	6

Sheet C4	1	2	3	4	5	6	7	8	Final
(Manitoba) Sahaidak / Lott	1	1	1	0	0	2	0	2	7
(United States) Peterson / Polo 🔨	0	0	0	1	2	0	1	0	4

=== Draw 10 ===
Saturday, October 2, 11:30 am

Sheet B2	1	2	3	4	5	6	7	8	Final
(Alberta) Moncur / Moncur	0	0	1	2	0	0	X	X	3
(Alberta) (Manitoba) Rocque / Calvert 🔨	4	1	0	0	3	2	X	X	10

Sheet B3	1	2	3	4	5	6	7	8	Final
(Saskatchewan) (British Columbia) Martin / Griffith 🔨	0	5	0	5	X	X	X	X	10
(Alberta) (Saskatchewan) Walker / Muyres	2	0	1	0	X	X	X	X	3

Sheet B4	1	2	3	4	5	6	7	8	9	Final
(British Columbia) Cotter / Cotter	3	0	3	0	1	0	2	0	1	10
(Ontario) Liscumb / Liscumb 🔨	0	2	0	2	0	1	0	4	0	9

Sheet C1	1	2	3	4	5	6	7	8	Final
(Alberta) Tran / Powell	1	0	0	1	0	1	0	X	3
(Ontario) Weagle / Epping 🔨	0	1	2	0	1	0	4	X	8

Sheet C2	1	2	3	4	5	6	7	8	Final
(United States) Anderson / Dropkin 🔨	3	1	0	2	1	X	X	X	7
(Alberta) Sweeting / Kennedy	0	0	1	0	0	X	X	X	1

Sheet C4	1	2	3	4	5	6	7	8	Final
(Alberta) (Ontario) Carey / Hodgson 🔨	2	0	1	0	1	0	1	0	5
(Alberta) Courtney / Moulding	0	1	0	1	0	1	0	3	6

=== Draw 11 ===
Saturday, October 2, 2:00 pm

Sheet B1	1	2	3	4	5	6	7	8	Final
(Manitoba) (Newfoundland and Labrador) Peterman / Gallant 🔨	1	1	1	0	1	0	0	1	5
(Ontario) Grandy / Janssen	0	0	0	1	0	1	1	0	3

Sheet B2	1	2	3	4	5	6	7	8	Final
(Saskatchewan) Just / Deis 🔨	0	3	0	0	3	1	2	X	9
(Quebec) Desjardins / Desjardins	1	0	2	1	0	0	0	X	4

Sheet B3	1	2	3	4	5	6	7	8	Final
(Ontario) Jones / Laing	0	0	0	1	1	2	0	0	4
(Manitoba) Sahaidak / Lott 🔨	1	3	1	0	0	0	1	1	7

Sheet C1	1	2	3	4	5	6	7	8	Final
(Alberta) McDonald / Walker	0	0	1	2	0	3	0	0	6
(Saskatchewan) Kitz / Stewart 🔨	1	1	0	0	1	0	1	0	4

Sheet C2	1	2	3	4	5	6	7	8	Final
(Ontario) Brunton / Lyon-Hatcher 🔨	3	0	0	0	1	1	0	X	5
(United States) Peterson / Polo	0	2	2	1	0	0	3	X	8

Sheet C4	1	2	3	4	5	6	7	8	Final
(Alberta) Sashkiw / Coutis	0	2	0	1	0	X	X	X	3
(Australia) Gill / Hewitt 🔨	1	0	4	0	5	X	X	X	10

=== Draw 12 ===
Saturday, October 2, 4:30 pm

Sheet B2	1	2	3	4	5	6	7	8	Final
(Alberta) Skrlik / Hamilton	0	1	0	1	0	0	0	X	2
(Manitoba) Njegovan / Carruthers 🔨	2	0	1	0	1	2	2	X	8

Sheet B3	1	2	3	4	5	6	7	8	Final
(Alberta) Homan / Morris 🔨	2	0	1	1	1	0	3	X	8
(Saskatchewan) Quick / Armstrong	0	1	0	0	0	2	0	X	3

Sheet B4	1	2	3	4	5	6	7	8	Final
(Saskatchewan) Kleiter / Laycock 🔨	2	0	0	1	0	0	1	X	4
(Alberta) Schmiemann / Ginter	0	1	1	0	4	2	0	X	8

Sheet C1	1	2	3	4	5	6	7	8	Final
(Alberta) Nedohin / Nedohin 🔨	1	0	2	2	2	1	X	X	8
(Alberta) Wilkes / Thiessen	0	1	0	0	0	0	X	X	1

Sheet C2	1	2	3	4	5	6	7	8	Final
(Alberta) Sturmay / Sturmay 🔨	2	0	1	0	0	3	0	X	6
(Ontario) Miskew / Fry	0	1	0	1	1	0	1	X	4

Sheet C3	1	2	3	4	5	6	7	8	Final
(Manitoba) (Saskatchewan) Birchard / Schneider	0	1	1	2	1	3	2	X	10
(Alberta) Sauder / Bottcher 🔨	4	0	0	0	0	0	0	X	4

== Playoffs ==
Qualification Games
8	(Saskatchewan) Just / Deis	8
9	(Manitoba) Sahaidak / Lott	5
5	(Manitoba) (Newfoundland and Labrador) Peterman / Gallant	7
12	(Saskatchewan) (British Columbia) Martin / Griffith	3
6	(Manitoba) (Saskatchewan) Birchard / Schneider	3
11	(Alberta) Sturmay / Sturmay	8
7	(Manitoba) Njegovan / Carruthers	6
10	(Ontario) Jones / Laing	8

Quarterfinals
1	(United States) Anderson / Dropkin	10
8	(Saskatchewan) Just / Deis	7
4	(Alberta) Sweeting / Kennedy	3
5	(Manitoba) (Newfoundland and Labrador) Peterman / Gallant	6
3	(Alberta) Homan / Morris	7
11	(Alberta) Sturmay / Sturmay	6
2	(Ontario) Weagle / Epping	2
10	(Ontario) Jones / Laing	6

Semifinals
1	(United States) Anderson / Dropkin	5
5	(Manitoba) (Newfoundland and Labrador) Peterman / Gallant	11
3	(Alberta) Homan / Morris	8
10	(Ontario) Jones / Laing	2

Final
5	(Manitoba) (Newfoundland and Labrador) Peterman / Gallant	5
3	(Alberta) Homan / Morris	6

=== Qualification Games ===
Saturday, October 2, 7:30 pm

Sheet C1	1	2	3	4	5	6	7	8	Final
(Manitoba) Njegovan / Carruthers 🔨	1	1	0	2	0	0	2	0	6
(Ontario) Jones / Laing	0	0	1	0	1	3	0	3	8

Sheet C2	1	2	3	4	5	6	7	8	Final
(Manitoba) (Newfoundland and Labrador) Peterman / Gallant 🔨	1	0	1	0	3	0	1	1	7
(Saskatchewan) (British Columbia) Martin / Griffith	0	1	0	1	0	1	0	0	3

Sheet C3	1	2	3	4	5	6	7	8	Final
(Manitoba) (Saskatchewan) Birchard / Schneider 🔨	1	0	1	0	1	0	0	X	3
(Alberta) Sturmay / Sturmay	0	2	0	3	0	1	2	X	8

Sheet C4	1	2	3	4	5	6	7	8	Final
(Saskatchewan) Just / Deis 🔨	2	2	1	0	0	1	0	2	8
(Manitoba) Sahaidak / Lott	0	0	0	2	2	0	1	0	5

=== Quarterfinals ===
Sunday, October 3, 9:00 am

Sheet B1	1	2	3	4	5	6	7	8	9	Final
(Alberta) Homan / Morris 🔨	0	1	1	0	2	1	1	0	1	7
(Alberta) Sturmay / Sturmay	2	0	0	3	0	0	0	1	0	6

Sheet B2	1	2	3	4	5	6	7	8	Final
(Ontario) Weagle / Epping 🔨	0	1	1	0	0	0	X	X	2
(Ontario) Jones / Laing	1	0	0	1	3	1	X	X	6

Sheet B3	1	2	3	4	5	6	7	8	Final
(United States) Anderson / Dropkin 🔨	0	0	5	2	0	3	0	X	10
(Saskatchewan) Just / Deis	1	2	0	0	3	0	1	X	7

Sheet B4	1	2	3	4	5	6	7	8	Final
(Alberta) Sweeting / Kennedy 🔨	0	1	0	1	0	1	0	X	3
(Manitoba) (Newfoundland and Labrador) Peterman / Gallant	1	0	2	0	1	0	2	X	6

=== Semifinals ===
Sunday, October 3, 11:30 am

Sheet B2	1	2	3	4	5	6	7	8	Final
(United States) Anderson / Dropkin 🔨	0	0	3	1	0	1	0	X	5
(Manitoba) (Newfoundland and Labrador) Peterman / Gallant	2	1	0	0	4	0	4	X	11

Sheet B3	1	2	3	4	5	6	7	8	Final
(Alberta) Homan / Morris 🔨	2	0	2	0	1	3	X	X	8
(Ontario) Jones / Laing	0	1	0	1	0	0	X	X	2

=== Final ===
Sunday, October 3, 2:00 pm

Sheet B3	1	2	3	4	5	6	7	8	Final
(Manitoba) (Newfoundland and Labrador) Peterman / Gallant	1	2	0	1	0	0	0	1	5
(Alberta) Homan / Morris 🔨	0	0	3	0	1	1	1	0	6
