= List of teams on the 2018–19 World Curling Tour =

Following is a list of teams on the 2018–19 World Curling Tour, which was part of the 2018-19 curling season. Only the skips of the teams are listed. For mixed doubles teams, both members of the team are listed.

== Men ==
As of December 18, 2018

Skip	Locale
Carson Ackerman	Saskatoon, Saskatchewan
Cole Adams	Calgary, Alberta
Rob Ainsley	Toronto, Ontario
Jared Allen	(United States) Blaine, Minnesota
Steve Allen	Ottawa, Ontario
Sergey Andrianov	Moscow, Russia
Ted Appelman	Edmonton, Alberta
Tomoji Arai	Tokyo, Japan
Evgeny Arkhipov	Moscow, Russia
Mike Armstrong	Regina, Saskatchewan
Tyson Armstrong	Lashburn, Saskatchewan
Rob Atkins	Winnipeg, Manitoba
Travis Bale	Winnipeg, Manitoba
Christian Bangerter	Bern, Switzerland
Josh Barry	Vancouver, British Columbia
Alexander Baumann	Baden Baden, Germany
Sean Beighton	(United States) Madison, Wisconsin
Peter Berset	Bern, Switzerland
Mark Bice	Sarnia, Ontario
Andrew Bilesky	New Westminster, British Columbia
Jayden Bindig	Wadena, Saskatchewan
Daniel Birchard	Winnipeg, Manitoba
Steve Birklid	(United States) Seattle, Washington
Todd Birr	(United States) Blaine, Minnesota
Matthew Blandford	Victoria, British Columbia
David Bohn	Winnipeg, Manitoba
Dennis Bohn	Winnipeg, Manitoba
Olaf Bolkenbaas	Zoetermeer, Netherlands
Tomasz Bosek	Gliwice, Poland
Brendan Bottcher	Edmonton, Alberta
Doug Brewer	Brockville, Ontario
Dillion Brittain	(United States) Spokane, Washington
Brian Brown	Black Diamond, Alberta
Craig Brown	(United States) Madison, Wisconsin
Rolf Bruggmann	Uzwil, Switzerland
Jed Brundidge	(United States) St. Paul, South Dakota
Cameron Bryce	Skelleftea, Sweden
Randy Bryden	Regina, Saskatchewan
Robin Brydone	Perth, Scotland
Dan Bubola	Calgary, Alberta
Martin Bukovsky	Prague, Czech Republic
Bryan Burgess	Thunder Bay, Ontario
Kurtis Byrd	Thunder Bay, Ontario
Aleksandr Bystrov	St. Petersburg, Russia
Bilal Ömer Çakır	Erzurum, Turkey
Braden Calvert	Winnipeg, Manitoba
Brayden Carpenter	New Westminster, British Columbia
Reid Carruthers	Winnipeg, Manitoba
Orrin Carson	Dumfries, Scotland
Struan Carson	Dumfries, Scotland
Michael Carss	Saskatoon, Saskatchewan
Corey Chambers	Winnipeg, Manitoba
Jordan Chandler	Sudbury, Ontario
Pascal Chouinard	Quebec City, Quebec
Colin Coben	Unity, Saskatchewan
Erik Colwell	Kelowna, British Columbia
Rene Comeau	Fredericton, New Brunswick
Scott Comfort	Wadena, Saskatchewan
Brandon Corbett	(United States) Rochester, New York
Terry Corbin	Brantford, Ontario
Denis Cordick	Georgetown, Ontario
Jim Cotter	Vernon, British Columbia
Martin Crête	St-Romuald, Quebec
Warren Cross	Edmonton, Alberta
Adam Cseke	Penticton, British Columbia
Ed Cyr	Fredericton, New Brunswick
Mark Dacey	Halifax, Nova Scotia
Chad Dahlseide	Calgary, Alberta
Mitchell Dales	Saskatoon, Saskatchewan
Ulrik Damm	Hvidovre, Denmark
Neil Dangerfield	Victoria, British Columbia
Timo Daniel	Laufen, Switzerland
Peter de Cruz	Geneve, Switzerland
Ryan Deis	Fox Valley, Saskatchewan
Rob Dennis	Richmond, British Columbia
Dayna Deruelle	Harriston, Ontario
Eugene Desjarlais	Winnipeg, Manitoba
Grant Dezura	Maple Ridge, British Columbia
Ian Dickie	Newmarket, Ontario
Ty Dilello	Winnipeg, Manitoba
Paul Dobson	Saint John, New Brunswick
German Doronin	Moscow, Russia
Colin Dow	Ottawa, Ontario
Tyler Drews	Winnipeg, Manitoba
Andrew Dunbar	Inuvik, Northwest Territories
Scott Dunnam	(United States) Philadelphia, Pennsylvania
Matt Dunstone	Regina, Saskatchewan
Bartosz Dzikowski	Katowice, Poland
Wylie Eden	Kelowna, British Columbia
Niklas Edin	Karlstad, Sweden
Greg Eigner	(United States) Fort Wayne, Indiana
Paul Ellarby	(United States) Lakeville, Minnesota
Dave Ellis	Toronto, Ontario
John Epping	Toronto, Ontario
David Falco	(United States) Denver, Colorado
Lloyd Fell	North Battleford, Saskatchewan
Mark Fenner	(United States) Blaine, Minnesota
Pete Fenson	(United States) Eveleth, Minnesota
Martin Ferland	Trois-Rivieres, Quebec
Pat Ferris	Grimsby, Ontario
Ian Fitzner-Leblanc	Halifax, Nova Scotia
Kyle Foster	Arborg, Manitoba
Michael Fournier	Montreal, Quebec
Brent Franko	Wadena, Saskatchewan
Joe Frans	St. Thomas, Ontario
Graham Freeman	Virden, Manitoba
Joshua Friesen	Winnipeg, Manitoba
Hiromitsu Fujinaka	Okayama, Japan
Motoyuki Fujisaki	Obihiro, Japan
Trevor Funk	Medicine Hat, Alberta
François Gagné	Montreal, Quebec
Scott Garnett	Strathmore, Alberta
Sean Geall	Kelowna, British Columbia
Brent Gedak	Estevan, Saskatchewan
Simon Gempeler	Adelboden, Switzerland
Dale Gibbs	(United States) St. Paul, Minnesota
Sergei Glukhov	Sochi, Russia
Masahiko Goto	Tokyo, Japan
Sean Grassie	Winnipeg, Manitoba
James Grattan	Oromocto, New Brunswick
Ritvars Gulbis	Riga, Latvia
Jason Gunnlaugson	Morris, Manitoba
Brad Gushue	St. John's, Newfoundland and Labrador
Al Hackner	Thunder Bay, Ontario
Ian Harley	(United States) Fort Wayne, Indiana
Klaudius Harsch	Füssen, Germany
Joey Hart	Whitby, Ontario
Rylan Hartley	Brantford, Ontario
Jeff Hartung	Langenburg, Saskatchewan
Kody Hartung	Langenburg, Saskatchewan
Jeremy Harty	Calgary, Alberta
Blair Haswell	Stranraer, Scotland
Cory Heggestad	Stroud, Ontario
Brad Heidt	Kerrobert, Saskatchewan
Josh Heidt	Kerrobert, Saskatchewan
Aron Hershmiller	Yorkton, Saskatchewan
Jan Hess	Zug, Switzerland
Scott Hill	Montreal, Quebec
Marco Hösli	Glarus, Switzerland
Steve Holdaway	Montreal, Quebec
Lionel Holm	Watrous, Saskatchewan
Mark Homan	Chelsea, Quebec
Tanner Horgan	Sudbury, Ontario
Deane Horning	Castlegar, British Columbia
Darryl Horsman	(United States) Tempe, Arizona
Glenn Howard	Penetanguishe, Ontario
Steven Howard	Regina, Saskatchewan
Vincent Huguelet	Morges, Switzerland
Daishi Ikezaki	Sapporo, Japan
Stephen Imes	(United States) Columbus, Ohio
Steve Irwin	Brandon, Manitoba
Jan Iseli	Biel, Switzerland
Ryo Itsubo	Tokyo, Japan
Nikita Ivanchatenko	Chelyabinsk, Russia
Masaki Iwai	Sapporo, Japan
Kenji Iwasaki	Miyota, Japan
Bret Jackson	(United States) Brighton, Michigan
Glen Jackson	Victoria, British Columbia
Brad Jacobs	Sault Ste. Marie, Ontario
Jason Jacobson	Saskatoon, Saskatchewan
Ryan Jacques	Edmonton, Alberta
Borys Jasiecki	Sopot, Poland
Mark Johnson	Grand Prairie, Alberta
Rob Johnson	Calgary, Alberta
Dylan Johnston	Thunder Bay, Ontario
Scott Jones	Moncton, New Brunswick
Akira Kageyama	Sagamihara, Japan
Kevin Kakela	(United States) Hansboro, North Dakota
Dustin Kalthoff	Saskatoon, Saskatchewan
Junpei Kanda	Tokyo, Japan
Arihito Kasahaea	Japan
Kagetora Kawahira	Karuizawa, Japan
Doug Kee	Ottawa, Ontario
Dale Kelly	Chatham, Ontario
Brady Kendel	Saskatoon, Saskatchewan
Kim Soo-hyuk	Seoul, South Korea
Jamie King	Edmonton, Alberta
Jay Kinnaird	Virden, Manitoba
Callum Kinnear	Perth, Scotland
Aleksandr Kirikov	Moscow, Russia
Zsolt Kiss	Budapest, Hungary
Rylan Kleiter	Saskatoon, Saskatchewan
Lukas Klima	Prague, Czech Republic
Jan Klossner	Langenthal, Switzerland
Tyler Klymchuk	Kamloops, British Columbia
Jamie Koe	Yellowknife, Northwest Territories
Kevin Koe	Calgary, Alberta
Colin Koivula	Thunder Bay, Ontario
Kenji Komoda	Sagamihara, Japan
Richard Krell	Waterloo, Ontario
Karel Kubeska	Prague, Czech Republic
Jop Kuijpers	Zoetermeer, Netherlands
Kwak Sanghyeon	(South Korea) Uijeongbu, Korea
Josh Lambden	Airdrie, Alberta
Panteleimon Lappo	Saint Petersburg, Russia
Ryan Larson	(United States) Kalamazoo, Michigan
Ross LaVallee	Carberry, Manitoba
Rick Law	Belle River, Ontario
Bob Leckron	(United States) Fort Wayne, Indiana
Bob Leclair	(United States) Tempe, Arizona
Harri Lill	Tallinn, Estonia
Mark Longworth	Vernon, British Columbia
Trevor Loreth	Winnipeg, Manitoba
Tanner Lott	Winnipeg Beach, Manitoba
Lucien Lottenbach	Luzern, Switzerland
William Lyburn	Winnipeg, Manitoba
Ma Xiuyue	Beijing, China
Brent MacDougall	Halifax, Nova Scotia
Doug MacKenzie	Halifax, Nova Scotia
Eddie MacKenzie	Charlottetown, Prince Edward Island
Dominik Märki	(United States) Minneapolis, Minnesota
Daniel Magnusson	Karlstad, Sweden
Wille Makela	Hyvinkaa, Finland
Jason Manns	Carberry, Manitoba
Matthew Manuel	Halifax, Nova Scotia
Kelly Marnoch	Carberry, Manitoba
Yannick Martel	Jonquiere, Quebec
Yuta Matsumura	Sapporo, Japan
Curtis McCannell	Pilot Mound, Manitoba
Mike McCarville	Thunder Bay, Ontario
Heath McCormick	Sarnia, Ontario
Scott McDonald	Kingston, Ontario
Shadrach Mcleod	Yellowknife, Northwest Territories
Jordan McNamara	Ottawa, Ontario
Cameron McNay	Dumfries, Scotland
Chris Medford	Cranbrook, British Columbia
Terry Meek	Calgary, Alberta
Eddy Mercier	Lyon, France
Paul Moffatt	Waterloo, Ontario
Jason Montgomery	Victoria, British Columbia
Sam Mooibroek	Ottawa, Ontario
Yasuhiro Morita	Kyoto, Japan
Amos Mosaner	Trentino, Italy
Bruce Mouat	Stirling, Scotland
Michael Mueller	Aarau, Switzerland
Glen Muirhead	Perth, Scotland
Tom Mulhern	(United States) Kalamazoo, Michigan
Steven Munroe	Quebec City, Quebec
Richard Muntain	Pinawa, Manitoba
Jamie Murphy	Halifax, Nova Scotia
Ryan Murphy	(United States) Chicago, Illinois
Kirk Muyres	Saskatoon, Saskatchewan
Tsubasa Nakagawa	Japan
Tanner Nathan	Sarnia, Ontario
Craig Nicko	(United States) Blaine, Minnesota
William Nordine	(United States) Kalamazoo, Michigan
Adam Norget	Edmonton, Alberta
Fredrik Nyman	Stockholm, Sweden
Frank O'Driscoll	Ottawa, Ontario
Alan O'Leary	Dartmouth, Nova Scotia
Ryo Ogihara	Karuizawa, Japan
Grant Olsen	Kamloops, British Columbia
Kota Onodera	Hokkaido, Japan
Alexander Orlov	St. Petersburg, Russia
Akira Otsuka	Tokyo, Japan
Kevin Ouellette	Halifax, Nova Scotia
James Pahl	Edmonton, Alberta
Jared Palanuik	Calgary, Alberta
Shane Parcels	Edmonton, Alberta
Greg Park	Oshawa, Ontario
Park Jongduk	Gangwon, South Korea
Kevin Park	Edmonton, Alberta
Shane Park	Edmonton, Alberta
Dave Parker	Cranbrook, British Columbia
Ross Paterson	Glasgow, Scotland
Jason Peckham	Maple Ridge, British Columbia
Jon Penney	(United States) Cincinnati, Ohio
Blair Pettipas	Halifax, Nova Scotia
Marc Pfister	Adelboden, Switzerland
Rick Phillips	Olds, Alberta
Joe Polo	(United States) Eveleth, Minnesota
Aleksandr Polushvaiko	Krasnodar, Russia
Aiden Poole	Chatham, Ontario
Daniel Poulsen	Hvidovre, Denmark
Greg Power	Halifax, Nova Scotia
Matthew Pring	(United States) Philadelphia, Pennsylvania
Hang Qu	Shanghai, China
Vadim Raev	Moscow, Russia
Magnus Ramsfjell	Oslo, Norway
Tomi Rantamaki	Hyvinkaa, Finland
Jānis Rēdlihs	Riga, Latvia
Andrew Reed	Kent, England
Rob Retchless	Toronto, Ontario
Joël Retornaz	Cembra, Italy
Charlie Richard	London, Ontario
Martin Rios	Glarus, Switzerland
Luca Rizzolli	Cembra, Italy
Kurt Roach	Sydney, Nova Scotia
Rick Rowsell	St. John's, Newfoundland and Labrador
Pierre-Luc Morissette	Saguenay, Quebec
Rich Ruohonen	(United States) Blaine, Minnesota
JT Ryan	Winnipeg, Manitoba
Konstantin Rykov	Vilnius, Lithuania
Kirill Savenkov	Dmitrov, Russia
Stephen Schneider	(British Columbia) Vancouver, BC
Andrin Schnider	St. Gallen, Switzerland
Yannick Schwaller	Bern, Switzerland
Kim-Lloyd Sciboz	Lausanne, Switzerland
Edward Scimia	(United States) Bridgeport, Connecticut
Thomas Scoffin	Whitehorse, Yukon
Ilya Shalamitski	Minsk, Belarus
Randie Shen	(Chinese Taipei) Taipei, Taipei
Michael Shepherd	Richmond Hill, Ontario
Danny Sherrard	Edmonton, Alberta
Daiki Shikano	Kitami, Japan
Kanya Shimizuno	Furano, Japan
Artem Shmakov	Novosibirsk, Russia
John Shuster	(United States) Duluth, Minnesota
Lyle Sieg	(United States) Seattle, Washington
Mike Siggins	(United States) Tempe, Arizona
Steen Sigurdson	Winnipeg, Manitoba
David Šik	Prague, Czech Republic
Duncan Silversides	Victoria, British Columbia
Chase Sinnett	(United States) Blaine, Minnesota
Trent Skanes	St. John's, Newfoundland and Labrador
Graham Sloan	Dumfries, Scotland
Aaron Sluchinski	Airdrie, Alberta
Skyler Slusar	(United States) Fargo, North Dakota
Greg Smith	St. John's, Newfoundland and Labrador
Jason Smith	(United States) Blaine, Minnesota
Jordan Smith	Winnipeg, Manitoba
Riley Smith	Winnipeg, Manitoba
Tyler Smith	Charlottetown, Prince Edward Island
Darryl Sobering	(United States) Denver, Colorado
John Steel	High River, Alberta
Sam Steep	Seaforth, Ontario
Jordan Steinke	Edmonton, Alberta
Chad Stevens	Halifax, Nova Scotia
Jeff Stewart	Carberry, Manitoba
Andrew Stopera	(United States) Briarcliff Manor, New York
John Stroh	Medicine Hat, Alberta
Karsten Sturmay	Edmonton, Alberta
Matt Sussman	(United States) Toledo, Ohio
Andrew Symonds	St. John's, Newfoundland and Labrador
Krystof Tabery	Prague, Czech Republic
Cody Tanaka	Richmond, British Columbia
Kotaro Tani	Japan
Tyler Tardi	Langley, British Columbia
Brian Terwedo	(United States) Blaine, Minnesota
Charley Thomas	Toronto, Ontario
Colin Thomas	St. John's, Newfoundland and Labrador
Kendal Thompson	Halifax, Nova Scotia
Stuart Thompson	Dartmouth, Nova Scotia
Ryan Thomson	Winnipeg, Manitoba
Tian Jiafeng	Beijing, China
Alexey Timofeev	Moscow, Russia
Brandon Tippin	Elmvale, Ontario
Travis Tokarz	Saskatoon, Saskatchewan
Noé Traub	Basel, Switzerland
Mārtiņš Trukšāns	Riga, Latvia
Satoru Tsukamoto	Kanagawa, Japan
Suguru Tsukamoto	Karuizawa, Japan
Souta Tsuruga	Sapporo, Japan
Wayne Tuck Jr.	Strathroy, Ontario
Kevin Tym	Edmonton, Alberta
Thomas Ulsrud	Oslo, Norway
Thomas Usselman	Rocky Mountain House, Alberta
Shingo Usui	Kitami, Japan
Matvey Vakin	Saint Petersburg, Russia
Evan van Amsterdam	Edmonton, Alberta
Jaap van Dorp	Zoetermeer, Netherlands
Mikhail Vaskov	Dmitrov, Russia
Jason Vaughan	Saint John, New Brunswick
Daylan Vavrek	Calgary, Alberta
Jaroslav Vedral	Prague, Czech Republic
Timothy Verreycken	Zemst, Belgium
Sergio Vez	Vitoria-Gasteiz, Spain
Damien Villard	Cambridge, Ontario
Brock Virtue	Kerrobert, Saskatchewan
Mihhail Vlassov	Tallinn, Estonia
Shane Vollman	Regina, Saskatchewan
Kriss Vonda	Riga, Latvia
Tadas Vyskupaitis	Vilnius, Lithuania
Bryce Wainio	(United States) Eveleth, Minnesota
Steffen Walstad	Oppdal, Norway
Brett Walter	Winnipeg, Manitoba
Graeme Weagle	Chester, Nova Scotia
Scott Webb	Peace River, Alberta
Daniel Wenzek	Langley, British Columbia
Wade White	Edmonton, Alberta
Ross Whyte	Dumfries, Scotland
Andrew Wickman	Winnipeg, Manitoba
John Willsey	Waterloo, Ontario
Chris Wimmer	Stroud, Ontario
Dan Wiza	(United States) Chicago, Illinois
Dieter Wuest	Luzern, Switzerland
Sebastian Wunderer	Kitzbuehel, Austria
Tsuyoshi Yamaguchi	Karuizawa, Japan
Riku Yanagisawa	Karuizawa, Japan
Matt Yeo	Edmonton, Alberta
Desmond Young	Edmonton, Alberta
Mingjie Yuan	Beijing, China
Lan Zagar	Ljubljana, Slovenia
Rudolf Zakharyan	Saint Petersburg, Russia
Jia Liang Zang	Harbin, China
Ze Zhong Zhang	Changchun, China
Qiang Zou	Beijing, China

== Women ==
As of December 19, 2018

Skip	Locale
Abby Ackland	Winnipeg, Manitoba
Sherry Anderson	Saskatoon, Saskatchewan
Shinobu Aota	Aomori, Japan
Hailey Armstrong	Ottawa, Ontario
Mary-Anne Arsenault	Halifax, Nova Scotia
Cathy Auld	Toronto, Ontario
Courtney Auld	Kingston, Ontario
Nicole Backe	Vancouver Island, British Columbia
Brett Barber	Biggar, Saskatchewan
Penny Barker	Moose Jaw, Saskatchewan
Hailey Beaudry	Thunder Bay, Ontario
Irina Belko	Minsk, Belarus
Hayley Bergman	Morris, Manitoba
Suzanne Birt	Charlottetown, Prince Edward Island
Amélie Blais	Levis, Quebec
Kaitlyn Bowman	Weyburn, Saskatchewan
Chelsea Brandwood	Toronto, Ontario
Theresa Breen	Halifax, Nova Scotia
Maureen Broder	Ottawa, Ontario
Chantele Broderson	Edmonton, Alberta
Jill Brothers	Halifax, Nova Scotia
Corryn Brown	Kamloops, British Columbia
Joelle Brown	Winnipeg, Manitoba
Kira Brunton	Sudbury, Ontario
Laura Burtnyk	Winnipeg, Manitoba
Rachel Burtnyk	Winnipeg, Manitoba
Chrissy Cadorin	Toronto, Ontario
Alyssa Calvert	Brandon, Manitoba
Chelsea Carey	Calgary/Edmonton, Alberta
Stephanie Carson	Halifax, Nova Scotia
Katie Chappellaz	Brandon, Manitoba
Candace Chisholm	Carlyle, Saskatchewan
Cory Christensen	(United States) Minneapolis, Minnesota
Jennifer Clark-Rouire	Winnipeg, Manitoba
Catherine Clifford	Edmonton, Alberta
Erica Cluff	Fredericton, New Brunswick
Justine Comeau	Fredericton, New Brunswick
Shiella Cowan	New Westminster, British Columbia
Andrea Crawford	Fredericton, New Brunswick
Samantha Crook	Sackville, New Brunswick
Sarah Daniels	Delta, British Columbia
Janais DeJong	Sexsmith, Alberta
Emily Deschenes	Manotick, Ontario
Jackie Dewar	Winnipeg, Manitoba
Jennifer Dodds	Stirling, Scotland
Annmarie Dubberstein	(United States) St. Paul, Minnesota
Hollie Duncan	Toronto, Ontario
Madeleine Dupont	Hvidovre, Denmark
Chantelle Eberle	Regina, Saskatchewan
Kerri Einarson	Winnipeg, Manitoba
Jenna Enge	Thunder Bay, Ontario
Rachel Erickson	Regina, Saskatchewan
Lisa Farnell	Kent, England
Aline Fellmann	Schaffhausen, Switzerland
Binia Feltscher	Langenthal, Switzerland
Kourtney Fesser	Saskatoon, Saskatchewan
Cait Flannery	(United States) Minneapolis, Minnesota
Allison Flaxey	Winnipeg, Manitoba
Shalon Fleming	Regina, Saskatchewan
Tracy Fleury	East St. Paul, Manitoba
Karynn Flory	Edmonton, Alberta
Susan Froud	Waterloo, Ontario
Satsuki Fujisawa	Kitami, Japan
Sarah Fullerton	Charlottetown/Summerside, Prince Edward Island
Kerry Galusha	Yellowknife, Northwest Territories
Jaimee Gardner	Burlington, Ontario
Gim Un-chi	Gyeonggi-do, South Korea
Alison Goring	Markham, Ontario
Shelly Graham	Fredericton, New Brunswick
Patsy Gregoire	Winnipeg, Manitoba
Diane Gushulak	New Westminster, British Columbia
Kayte Gyles	New Westminster, British Columbia
Lisa Hale	Dauphin, Manitoba
Han Siyu	Changchun, China
Han Yu	Beijing, China
Jacqueline Harrison	Toronto, Ontario
Jennifer Harvey	Cornwall, Ontario
Anna Hasselborg	Sundbyberg, Sweden
Julie Hastings	Thornhill, Ontario
Heather Heggestad	Oakville, Ontario
Ursi Hegner	Uzwil, Switzerland
Krysta Hilker	Edmonton, Alberta
Tanya Hilliard	Dartmouth, Nova Scotia
Amber Holland	Regina, Saskatchewan
Rachel Homan	Ottawa, Ontario
Erica Hopson	Ottawa, Ontario
Ashley Howard	Regina, Saskatchewan
Lindsay Hudyma	Vancouver, British Columbia
Corrie Hürlimann	Luzern, Switzerland
Danielle Inglis	Etobicoke, Ontario
Sophie Jackson	Stirling, Scotland
Pauline Jeanneret	Åland, Finland
Sandra Jenkins	Kelowna, British Columbia
Daniela Jentsch	Fuessen, Germany
Kaitlin Jewer	Lindsay, Ontario
Jennalee Johnson	(United States) St. Paul, Minnesota
Colleen Jones	Halifax, Nova Scotia
Jennifer Jones	Winnipeg, Manitoba
Kaitlyn Jones	Halifax, Nova Scotia
Marteen Jones	Lindsay, Ontario
Sherry Just	Saskatoon, Saskatchewan
Elēna Kāpostiņa	Riga, Latvia
Lindsay Kastrau	Ottawa, Ontario
Nicky Kaufman	Edmonton, Alberta
Oona Kauste	Hyvinkaa, Finland
Raphaela Keiser	Flims, Switzerland
Adele Kezama	Edmonton, Alberta
Colleen Kilgallen	Winnipeg, Manitoba
Kim Eun-jung	Uiseong, South Korea
Kim Min-ji	Chuncheon City, South Korea
Abbey Kitchens	(United States) Devils Lake, North Dakota
Tori Koana	Fujiyoshida, Japan
Mina Kobayashi	Sapporo, Japan
Alina Kovaleva	Saint-Petersburg, Russia
Anna Kubeskova	Prague, Czech Republic
Kaede Kudo	Tokyo, Japan
Isabelle Ladouceur	Halifax, Nova Scotia
Tene Link	Tallinn, Estonia
Sijia Liu	Harbin, China
Kristen MacDiarmid	Halifax, Nova Scotia
Triin Madisson	Tallinn, Estonia
Lindsay Makichuk	Spruce Grove, Alberta
Sarah Mallais	Saint John, New Brunswick
Kirsten Marshall	Kitchener, Ontario
Jodi Marthaller	Lethbridge, Alberta
Krista McCarville	Thunder Bay, Ontario
Nancy McConnery	Halifax, Nova Scotia
Deb McCreanor	Winnipeg, Manitoba
Julie McEvoy	Halifax, Nova Scotia
Megan McGillivray	Vernon, British Columbia
Shaina McGiverin	Vernon, British Columbia
Tiffany McLean	Brandon, Manitoba
Mei Jie	Beijing, China
Eva Miklikova	Prague, Czech Republic
Jessica Mitchell	Saskatoon, Saskatchewan
Maile Mölder	Tallinn, Estonia
Rebecca Morrison	Stirling, Scotland
Melissa Morrow	Charlottetown, Prince Edward Island
Eve Muirhead	Stirling, Scotland
Morgan Muise	Calgary, Alberta
Alevtina Muraveva	Saint Petersburg, Russia
Jestyn Murphy	Mississauga, Ontario
Mary Myketyn-Driscoll	Halifax, Nova Scotia
Seina Nakajima	Nagano, Japan
Mayu Natsuizaka	Sapporo, Japan
Anette Norberg	Stocksund, Sweden
Oh Eun-Jin	Jeonju, South Korea
Dorottya Palancsa	Budapest, Hungary
Virginijia Paulauskaite	Vilnius, Lithuania
Sharon Pekrul	Winnipeg, Manitoba
Roxane Perron	Quebec City, Quebec
Jaclyn Peters	Ottawa, Ontario
Beth Peterson	Winnipeg, Manitoba
Marta Pluta	Gliwice, Poland
Ann Podoll	(United States) Fargo, North Dakota
Allison Pottinger	(United States) St. Paul, Minnesota
Emily Quello	(United States) Fairbanks, Minnesota
Taylor Reese-Hansen	Victoria, British Columbia
Cassidy Regush	Regina, Saskatchewan
Kim Rhyme	(United States) St. Paul, Minnesota
Brette Richards	Kelowna, British Columbia
Jo-Ann Rizzo	Toronto, Ontario
Darcy Robertson	Winnipeg, Manitoba
Sylvie Robichaud	Moncton, New Brunswick
Kelsey Rocque	Edmonton, Alberta
Nina Roth	(United States) Blaine, Minnesota
Everly Royea	Chilliwack, British Columbia
Ieva Rudzīte	Riga, Latvia
Vlada Rumyanceva	Moscow, Russia
Melissa Runing	(United States) Mankato, Minnesota
Taryn Schachtel	Lashburn, Saskatchewan
Casey Scheidegger	Lethbridge, Alberta
Kim Schneider	Kronau, Saskatchewan
Andrea Schoepp	Garmisch-Partenkirchen, Germany
Irene Schori	Limmattal, Switzerland
Mandy Selzer	Balgonie, Saskatchewan
Stephanie Senneker	(United States) Kalamazoo, Michigan
Danielle Shaughnessy	Nanaimo, British Columbia
Marla Sherrer	Lacombe, Alberta
Anna Sidorova	Moscow, Russia
Robyn Silvernagle	North Battleford, Saskatchewan
Ashton Simard	Edmonton, Alberta
Jamie Sinclair	(United States) Blaine, Minnesota
Kayla Skrlik	Calgary, Alberta
Kim Slattery	Vernon, British Columbia
Ocean Smart	Edmonton, Alberta
Julie Smith	(United States) St. Paul, Minnesota
Veronica Smith	Charlottetown, Prince Edward Island
Barb Spencer	Sanford, Manitoba
Laurie St-Georges	Laval, Quebec
Elīza Stabulniece	Riga, Latvia
Iveta Staša-Šaršūne	Riga, Latvia
Elena Stern	Oberwallis, Switzerland
Tiffany Steuber	Spruce Grove, Alberta
Kristen Streifel	Regina, Saskatchewan
Kaitlin Stubbs	Calgary, Alberta
Selena Sturmay	Edmonton, Alberta
Tova Sundberg	Ostersund, Sweden
Sierra Sutherland	Ottawa, Ontario
Marta Szeliga-Frynia	Lodz, Poland
Momoha Tabata	Sapporo, Japan
Ashley Thevenot	Saskatoon, Saskatchewan
Karla Thompson	Kamloops/Victoria, British Columbia
Julie Tippin	Woodstock, Ontario
Silvana Tirinzoni	Aarau, Switzerland
Ariel Traxler	(United States) Fairbanks, Alaska
Marie Turmann	Tallinn, Estonia
Miia Turto	Hyvinkaa, Finland
Terry Ursel	Morris, Manitoba
Janelle Vachon	Stonewall, Manitoba
Kesa Van Osch	Parksville, British Columbia
Rhonda Varnes	Edmonton, Alberta
Suzanna Viau	(United States) St. Paul, Minnesota
Laura Walker	Edmonton, Alberta
Kathy Wall	St. Catharines, Ontario
Emma Wallingford	Ottawa, Ontario
Cathlia Ward	St. John's, Newfoundland and Labrador
Sarah Wark	Chilliwack, British Columbia
Katelyn Wasylkiw	Unionville, Ontario
Kristy Watling	Winnipeg, Manitoba
Ashley Waye	Toronto, Ontario
Michelle Williams	Lower Sackville, Nova Scotia
Rae Ann Williamson	Estevan, Saskatchewan
Maggie Wilson	Aberdeen, Scotland
Selina Witschonke	Luzern, Switzerland
Isabella Wrana	Stockholm, Sweden
Nora Wüest	Wetzikon, Switzerland
Ying Yang	Harbin, China
Sayaka Yoshimura	Sapporo, Japan
Veronica Zappone	Trentino, Italy
Di Zhang	Harbin, China
Li Jun Zhang	Beijing, China
Nola Zingel	Lloydminster, Alberta

== Mixed doubles ==
As of October 13, 2018

Team	Locale
Melissa Adams/Alex Robichaud	Fredericton, New Brunswick
Gina Aitken/Scott Andrews	Stirling, Scotland
Sarah Anderson/Korey Dropkin	(United States) Minneapolis, Minnesota
Deirdre Arnold/Richard Arnold	(United States) Durham, North Carolina
Ashley Becker/Ryan Skjerdal	Weyburn, Saskatchewan
Bridget Becker/Sean Becker	Naseby, New Zealand
Lyndsey Berlett/Scott Dow	Kitchener-Waterloo, Ontario
Alina Biktimirova/Timur Gadzhikhanov	Moscow, Russia
Shannon Birchard/Catlin Schneider	Winnipeg, Manitoba / White City, Saskatchewan
Bernadett Biro/Otto Kalocsay	Budapest, Hungary
Aleksandra Bylina/Karol Nowakowski	Kraków, Poland
Sarah Cai Huijie/Lionel Loh Caihao	Singapore, Singapore
Jolene Campbell/Trent Knapp	Regina, Saskatchewan
Katie Cottrill/Shawn Cottrill	Belgrave, Ontario
Joanne Curtis/Brodie Tarvit	London, Ontario
Émilie Desjardins/Robert Desjardins	Chicoutimi, Quebec
Jolanda Devaux/Michael Devaux	Baden, Switzerland
Brenda Edgar/Lorne Koch	Vanastra, Ontario
Kim Forge/Jay Merchant	Victoria, Australia
Anna Fowler/Ben Fowler	London, England
Irantzu Garcia/Gontzal Garcia	Vitoria-Gasteiz, Spain
Mandy Gebhart/Andrew Fairfull	Guelph, Ontario
Cynthia Gertsch/Cyril Gertsch	Duebendorf, Switzerland
Sarah Gierling/Peter Naus	Toronto, Ontario
Tahli Gill/Sam Williams	Brisbane, Australia
Em Good/MacAllan Guy	(United States) Seattle, Washington
Sheri Greenman/Michael Zuliani	Unionville, Ontario
Christine Groenbech/Martin Groenbech	Taarnby, Denmark
Stella Heiss/Marc Muskatewitz	Fuessen, Germany
Johanna Heldin/Kristian Lindstroem	Uppsala, Sweden
Lynn Hewitt/Dean Hewitt	Sydney, Australia
Manon Humbert/Romain Borini	Megeve, France
Farzana Hussain/Rayad Hussain	Leonora, Guyana
Hyeri Jang/Chi Won Choi	(South Korea) Uiseong, Korea
Thivya Jeyaranjan/Brett Sargon	Naseby, New Zealand
Jennifer Jones/Brent Laing	Shanty Bay, Ontario
Eszter Juhasz/Markku Uusipaavalniemi	Hyvinkaa, Finland
Sherry Just/Ryan Deis	Fox Valley, Saskatchewan
Lena Kapp/Benny Kapp	Fuessen, Germany
Oona Kauste/Aku Kauste	Hyvinkaa, Finland
Masami Kitamura/Tomokazu Kitamura	Okayama, Japan
Chaelynn Kitz/Brayden Stewart	Saskatoon, Saskatchewan
Madison Kleiter/Rylan Kleiter	Saskatoon, Saskatchewan
Breanne Knapp/Kelly Knapp	Regina, Saskatchewan
Maria Komarova/Daniil Goriachev	Moscow, Russia
Lexi Lanigan/Alex Fenson	(United States) Chaska, Minnesota
Lucrezia Laurenti/Marco Pascale	Trentino, Italy
Kaitlyn Lawes/John Morris	Winnipeg, Manitoba / Canmore, Alberta
Iluta Linde/Arnis Veidemanis	Riga, Latvia
Catherine Liscumb/Chris Liscumb	Ilderton, Ontario
Stacey MacNeil/Brady Gould	(United States) Charlotte, North Carolina
Triin Madisson/Karl Kukner	Tallinn, Estonia
Nancy Martin/Tyrel Griffith	Saskatoon, Saskatchewan / Kelowna, British Columbia
Daniela Matulova/Milan Moravcik	Bratislava, Slovakia
Judith McCleary/Lee McCleary	Stirling, Scotland
Kirstin McKeown/Gabriel Nickel	(United States) Blaine, Minnesota
Christine McMakin/Riley Fenson	(United States) Bemidji, Minnesota
Renee Michaud/Trevor Johnson	Regina, Saskatchewan
Clare Moores/Lance Wheeler	(United States) Denver, Colorado
Sandrine Morand/Romain Borini	Megeve, France
Katie Morrissey/Mike Lambert	Edmonton, Alberta
Anastasia Moskaleva/Alexander Eremin	Moscow, Russia
Sulisse Munich/Tom Munich	(United States) Oconomowoc, Wisconsin
Janet Murphy/Hugh Murphy	Mississauga, Ontario
Jana Naceradska/Radek Bohac	Prague, Czech Republic
Veronika Neznalova/Matej Neznal	Prague, Czech Republic
Kalynn Park/Charley Thomas	Calgary, Alberta
Agnieszka Paszek/Michal Paszek	Poland
Zuzana Paulova/Tomas Paul	Prague, Czech Republic
Christa Perepelitza/Rodney Ouellette	Cold Lake, Alberta
Jenny Perret/Martin Rios	Glarus, Switzerland
Vicky Persinger/Christopher Plys	(United States) Fairbanks, Alaska
Jocelyn Peterman/Brett Gallant	Winnipeg, Manitoba / St. John's, Newfoundland and Labrador
Sharon Pringle/Terry Pringle	Coldwater, Ontario
Ashley Quick/Mike Armstrong	Regina, Saskatchewan
Maia Ramsfjell/Magnus Ramsfjell	Lillehammer, Norway
Ellen Redlick/Ryan Skjerdal	Saskatoon, Saskatchewan
Dace Regža/Ansis Regža	Riga, Latvia
Harley Rohrbacher/Guy Davis	(United States) Pittsburgh/Austin, Pennsylvania
Nina Roth/Kroy Nernberger	(United States) Madison, Wisconsin
Ieva Rudzīte/Artis Zentelis	Riga, Latvia
Daniela Rupp/Kevin Wunderlin	Zug, Switzerland
Lynn Salmon/John Salmon	(United States) Ossining, New York
Riley Sandham/Brendan Craig	Georgetown, Ontario
Bobbie Sauder/Brendan Bottcher	Spruce Grove, Alberta
Danielle Schmiemann/Jason Ginter	Edmonton, Alberta
Pia-Lisa Schoell/Konstantin Kampf	Fuessen, Germany
Andrea Schoepp/Rainer Schoepp	Garmisch-Partenkirchen, Germany
Mackenzie Schwartz/Sam Willis	Lumsden, Saskatchewan
Courtney Shaw/Melvin Shaw	(United States) Washington, District of Columbia
Nicole Sigvaldason/Ian McMillan	Winnipeg, Manitoba
Kirsten Silcox/Jason Keerak	Calgary, Alberta
Makena Simmons/Pat Simmons	Moose Jaw, Saskatchewan
Jamie Sinclair/Sean Beighton	(United States) Blaine, Minnesota
Kristin Moen Skaslien/Magnus Nedregotten	Oslo, Norway
Katarzyna Staszczak/Aleksander Grzelka	Kraków, Poland
Jayne Stirling/Fraser Kingan	Dumfries, Scotland
Maureen Stolt/Peter Stolt	(United States) Plymouth, Minnesota
Kristen Streifel/Steve Laycock	Saskatoon, Saskatchewan
Ildikó Szekeres/Gyorgy Nagy	Budapest, Hungary
Marta Szeliga-Frynia/Pawel Frynia	Lodz, Poland
Holly Thompson/Anton Hood	Naseby, New Zealand
Kimberly Tuck/Wayne Tuck Jr.	Ilderton, Ontario
Marie Turmann/Harri Lill	Tallinn, Estonia
Mila Turto/Jari Turto	Hyvinkaa, Finland
Susan Tweedy/Terry Lee	Coldwater, Ontario
Kelsey Waker/Carl deConinck Smith	Gull Lake, Saskatchewan
Adela Walczak/Andrzej Augustyniak	Lodz, Poland
Laura Walker/Kirk Muyres	Edmonton, Alberta / Saskatoon, Saskatchewan
Monica Walker/Alex Leichter	(United States) Boston, Massachusetts
Wang Rui/Ba Dexin	Harbin, China
Malin Wendel/Fabian Wingfors	Goteborg, Sweden
Nicole Westlund Stewart/Tyler Stewart	Ayr, Ontario
Therese Westman/Robin Ahlberg	Stockholm, Sweden
Stephanie Wild/Thomas Kupper	Baden, Switzerland
Fiona Wunderlich/Till Wunderlich	Oberstdorf, Germany
Jiaxin Yu/Xiangkun Wang	Harbin, China
Veronica Zappone/Simone Gonin	Trentino, Italy
