= Rocky Mountain Mixed Doubles Classic =

- Established: 2019
- Host city: Banff & Canmore Alberta, Canada
- Arena: The Fenlands Banff Recreation Centre & Canmore Golf & Curling Club
- Website: https://mountaincurling.ca
- Purse: $30,000
- 2024 champion: (Alberta) Jocelyn Peterman / Brett Gallant

The Rocky Mountain Mixed Doubles Classic (RMMDC), formerly the Qualico Mixed Doubles Classic, is an annual mixed doubles curling event held in Banff and Canmore Alberta, Canada. The bonspiel is held in a round-robin format with a $30,000 purse. The event attracts top curlers from around the world. The event was previously called the Qualico Mixed Doubles Classic (QMDC).

== History ==
The event was founded in 2019 by the Rocky Mountain Curling Association and Qualico held the naming rights for the 2019-2022 events.

The December 2024 event acted as a qualifier for the 2025 Canadian Mixed Doubles Curling Olympic Trials.

== Broadcasting ==
The Rocky Mountain Mixed Doubles Classic has no deals with any networks; however, livestream coverage of the event is provided by the in house media team. The World Curling Tour held the worldwide streaming rights to the 2020 round-robin stage and the international streaming rights to the 2020 finals. CBC Television picked up the Canadian streaming rights to the 2020 finals for their online platform.

== Past champions ==
Qualico Mixed Doubles Classic
Year	Winning pair	Runner-up pair	Purse (CDN)
2019	(United States) Sarah Anderson / Korey Dropkin	(Manitoba) Jocelyn Peterman / (Newfoundland and Labrador) Brett Gallant	$30,000
2020	(Alberta) Rachel Homan / John Morris	(United States) Sarah Anderson / Korey Dropkin	$30,000
2021	(Alberta) Rachel Homan / John Morris	(Manitoba) Jocelyn Peterman / (Newfoundland and Labrador) Brett Gallant	$30,000
2022	(Switzerland) Marlene Albrecht / (Manitoba) Matt Wozniak	(Alberta) Jocelyn Peterman / Brett Gallant	$30,000
Rocky Mountain Mixed Doubles Classic
2024 (Jan.)	(United States) Cory Thiesse / Korey Dropkin	(Alberta) Paige Papley / Evan van Amsterdam	$30,000
2024 (Dec.)	(Alberta) Jocelyn Peterman / Brett Gallant	(Manitoba) Kadriana Lott / Colton Lott	$30,000
