= 2019 PEI Tankard =

- Host city: Alberton, Prince Edward Island
- Arena: Western Community Curling Club
- Dates: January 9–13
- Winner: Team Likely
- Curling club: Charlottetown CC, Charlottetown & Western Community CC, Alberton
- Skip: John Likely
- Third: Anson Carmody
- Second: Steve Burgess
- Lead: Robbie Doherty
- Alternate: Matthew Nabuurs
- Finalist: Eddie MacKenzie

The 2019 PEI Tankard, the provincial men's curling championship for Prince Edward Island, was held January 9–13 at the Western Community Curling Club in Alberton, Prince Edward Island. The winning John Likely rink represented Prince Edward Island at the 2019 Tim Hortons Brier, Canada's national men's curling championship. The event was held in conjunction with the 2019 Prince Edward Island Scotties Tournament of Hearts, the provincial women's championship.

== Teams Entered ==
Skip	Third	Second	Lead	Alternate	Club(s)
Darren Higgins	Tim Hockin	Mike Spencer	Jonathan Greenan		Silver Fox Curling Club, Summerside
John Likely	Anson Carmody	Steve Burgess	Robbie Doherty	Matthew Nabuurs	Charlottetown Curling Complex, Charlottetown; Western Community Curling Club, Alberton
Eddie MacKenzie	Tyler MacKenzie	Christopher Gallant	Sean Ledgerwood		Charlottetown Curling Complex, Charlottetown
Jamie Newson	Corey Miller	Patrick Ramsay	Adam Arsenault		Silver Fox Curling Club, Summerside
Tyler Smith	Ryan Abraham	Alex MacFadyen	Ryan Lowery		Charlottetown Curling Complex, Charlottetown
Steve vanOuwerkerk	Sam Ramsay	Ian Juurlink	Nick vanOuwerkerk		Silver Fox Curling Club, Summerside

== Knockout draw brackets ==
=== A Event ===
Quarterfinals
Darren Higgins	4
John Likely	6
Eddie MacKenzie	7
Jamie Newson	8

Semifinals
Steve vanOuwerkerk	4
John Likely	7
Tyler Smith	3
Jamie Newson	6

Final
John Likely	6
Jamie Newson	5

=== B Event ===
Quarterfinals
Tyler Smith	8
Darren Higgins	6
Steve vanOuwerkerk	4
Eddie MacKenzie	8

Semifinals
Tyler Smith	7
John Likely	1
Eddie MacKenzie	9
Jamie Newson	1

Final
Tyler Smith	3
Eddie MacKenzie	6

=== C Event ===
Quarterfinals
Darren Higgins	10
Jamie Newson	4
Steve vanOuwerkerk	6
John Likely	8

Semifinals
Darren Higgins	8
Tyler Smith	2
John Likely	5
Eddie MacKenzie	4

Final
Darren Higgins	2
John Likely	7

== Playoffs ==
As the winner of two events, the John Likely rink needed to be beaten twice. Likely defeated MacKenzie in the first game, so a second game was not necessary.

Semifinal		Final
		John Likely
John Likely	6	John Likely
Eddie MacKenzie	5

=== Playoff #1 ===
Sunday, January 13, 8:00 a.m.

Team	1	2	3	4	5	6	7	8	9	10	Final
John Likely 🔨	0	2	0	0	0	1	0	2	0	1	6
Eddie MacKenzie	1	0	1	1	1	0	1	0	0	0	5

2019 PEI Tankard
(Prince Edward Island)
John Likely
3rd PEI Provincial Championship title
