= 2012 International Bernese Ladies Cup =

- Host city: Bern, Switzerland
- Arena: Curlingbahn Allmend
- Dates: January 13–15
- Winner: (Switzerland) Michèle Jäggi
- Curling club: Curlingbahn Allmend, Bern
- Skip: Michèle Jäggi
- Third: Marisa Winkelhausen
- Second: Stéphanie Jäggi
- Lead: Nicole Schwälgi
- Finalist: (Canada) Jennifer Jones

The 2012 International Bernese Ladies Cup was held from January 13 to 15 at the Curlingbahn Allmend in Bern, Switzerland as part of the 2011–12 World Curling Tour. The winning team of Michèle Jäggi took home the event purse of CHF20,000. The event was held in a triple-knockout format.

For the first time, a spot in the Cup was awarded to the winner of the 2011 Curl Atlantic Championship, Suzanne Birt of Prince Edward Island, Canada.

== Teams ==
Skip	Third	Second	Lead	Locale
Melanie Barbezat	Briar Hürlimann	Mara Gautschi	Janine Wyss	Basel, Switzerland
Joan McCusker (fourth)	Jan Betker (skip)	Lindsay Sparkes	Marcia Gudereit	Regina, Canada
Suzanne Birt	Shelly Bradley	Robyn MacPhee	Leslie MacDougall	Charlottetown, Canada
Corrine Bourquin	Fabienne Fürbringer	Daniela Rupp	Andrea Friedli	Uitikon, Switzerland
Erika Brown	Debbie McCormick	Ann Swisshelm	Jessica Schultz	Madison, United States
Chelsea Carey	Kristy McDonald	Kristen Foster	Lindsay Titheridge	Morden, Canada
Camille Crottaz	Andrea Marx	Bettina Marx	Eléonore Pravex	Geneva, Switzerland
Daniela Driendl	Martina Linder	Marika Trettin	Gesa Angrick	Germany
Binia Feltscher	Marlene Albrecht	Franziska Kaufmann	Christine Urech	Switzerland
Hannah Fleming	Lauren Gray	Alice Spence	Abigail Brown	Scotland
Anna Hasselborg	Sabina Kraupp	Margaretha Dryburgh	Zandra Flyg	Sweden
Franziska Fischer (fourth)	Juliane Jacoby (skip)	Josephine Obertsdorf	Martina Fink	Germany
Michèle Jäggi	Marisa Winkelhausen	Stéphanie Jäggi	Nicole Schwägli	Bern, Switzerland
Colleen Jones	Nancy Delahunt	Marsha Sobey	Mary Sue Radford	Halifax, Canada
Jennifer Jones	Kaitlyn Lawes	Dawn Askin	Jennifer Clark-Rouire	Winnipeg, Canada
Anna Kubešková	Tereza Plíšková	Veronika Herdová	Eliška Jalovcová	Czech Republic
Nadine Lehmann	Jenny Perret	Valerie Lutz	Gisele Beuchat	Switzerland
Leandra Mueller	Claudia Zbinden	Rebekka Engel	Flurine Kobler	Luzern, Switzerland
Lene Nielsen	Helle Simonsen	Jeanne Ellegaard	Maria Poulsen	Denmark
Cathy Overton-Clapham	Jenna Loder	Ashley Howard	Breanne Meakin	Winnipeg, Canada
Oihane Otaegi	Leire Otaegi	Aitana Saenz	Iera Irazusta	Spain
Mirjam Ott	Carmen Schäfer	Carmen Küng	Janine Greiner	Switzerland
Evita Regza	Dace Regza	Vineta Smilga	Dace Pastare	Latvia
Sarah Reid	Rachael Simms	Lorna Vevers	Barbara McFarlane	Glasgow, Scotland
Andrea Schöpp	Imogen Oona Lehmann	Corinna Scholz	Stella Heiß	Füssen, Germany
Anna Sidorova	Liudmila Privivkova	Nkeiruka Ezekh	Ekaterina Galkina	Moscow, Russia
Manuela Siegrist	Alina Pätz	Claudia Hug	Nicole Dünki	Basel, Switzerland
Maria Prytz (fourth)	Christina Bertrup	Maria Wennerström	Margaretha Sigfridsson (skip)	Umea, Sweden
Martina Strnadová	Zuzana Hájková	Iveta Janatová	Eva Málková	Czech Republic
Silvana Tirinzoni	Irene Schori	Esther Neuenschwander	Sandra Gantenbein	Switzerland
Melanie Wild	Regina Rohner	Laura Wunderlin	Gabriela Welti	Lucerne, Switzerland
Olga Zyablikova	Ekaterina Antonova	Victorya Moiseeva	Galina Arsenkina	Moscow, Russia

== Knockout results ==
=== A event ===
First Knockout
(Canada) Jennifer Jones	12
(Switzerland) Nadine Lehmann	5
(Switzerland) Silvana Tirinzoni	9
(Russia) Olga Zyablikova	7
(Canada) Colleen Jones	0
(Czech Republic) Anna Kubešková	6
(Switzerland) Camille Crottaz	4
(Sweden) Margaretha Sigfridsson	10
(Canada) Chelsea Carey	5
(Switzerland) Melanie Barbezat	1
(Scotland) Sarah Reid	4
(Switzerland) Corrine Bourquin	5
(United States) Erika Brown	4
(Germany) Daniela Driendl	6
(Spain) Oihane Otaegi	1
(Switzerland) Mirjam Ott	9

Quarterfinals
(Canada) Jennifer Jones	6
(Switzerland) Silvana Tirinzoni	4
(Czech Republic) Anna Kubešková	5
(Sweden) Margaretha Sigfridsson	3
(Canada) Chelsea Carey	5
(Switzerland) Corrine Bourquin	4
(Germany) Daniela Driendl	4
(Switzerland) Mirjam Ott	10

Semifinals
(Canada) Jennifer Jones	8
(Czech Republic) Anna Kubešková	2
(Canada) Chelsea Carey	3
(Switzerland) Mirjam Ott	4

Qualifier 1
(Canada) Jennifer Jones	7
(Switzerland) Mirjam Ott	6

First Knockout
(Canada) Cathy Overton-Clapham	10
(Germany) Juliane Jacoby	1
(Russia) Anna Sidorova	4
(Canada) Suzanne Birt	7
(Sweden) Anna Hasselborg	7
(Switzerland) Manuela Siegrist	2
(Switzerland) Leandra Mueller	2
(Germany) Andrea Schöpp	7
(Switzerland) Binia Feltscher	3
(Czech Republic) Martina Strnadová	6
(Denmark) Lene Nielsen	7
(Switzerland) Melanie Wild	2
(Canada) Jan Betker	7
(Scotland) Hannah Fleming	6
(Latvia) Evita Regza	6
(Switzerland) Michèle Jäggi	8

Quarterfinals
(Canada) Cathy Overton-Clapham	5
(Canada) Suzanne Birt	6
(Sweden) Anna Hasselborg	3
(Germany) Andrea Schöpp	2
(Czech Republic) Martina Strnadová	4
(Denmark) Lene Nielsen	5
(Canada) Jan Betker	6
(Switzerland) Michèle Jäggi	7

Semifinals
(Canada) Suzanne Birt	5
(Sweden) Anna Hasselborg	7
(Denmark) Lene Nielsen	2
(Switzerland) Michèle Jäggi	6

Qualifier 2
(Sweden) Anna Hasselborg	1
(Switzerland) Michèle Jäggi	8

=== B event ===
Second Knockout
(Switzerland) Nadine Lehmann	5
(Russia) Olga Zyablikova	6
(Canada) Colleen Jones	2
(Switzerland) Camille Crottaz	7

Quarterfinals
(Russia) Olga Zyablikova	4
(Switzerland) Corrine Bourquin	7
(Germany) Daniela Driendl	8
(Switzerland) Camille Crottaz	4

Semifinals
(Switzerland) Corrine Bourquin	1
(Canada) Suzanne Birt	7
(Denmark) Lene Nielsen	8
(Germany) Daniela Driendl	2

To Qualifier 3
(Canada) Suzanne Birt	7
(Denmark) Lene Nielsen	1

Second Knockout
(Switzerland) Melanie Barbezat	5
(Scotland) Sarah Reid	7
(United States) Erika Brown	9
(Spain) Oihane Otaegi	2

Quarterfinals
(Scotland) Sarah Reid	5
(Switzerland) Silvana Tirinzoni	7
(Sweden) Margaretha Sigfridsson	8
(United States) Erika Brown	1

Semifinals
(Switzerland) Silvana Tirinzoni	5
(Sweden) Margaretha Sigfridsson	4

To Qualifier 3
(Sweden) Anna Hasselborg	3
(Switzerland) Silvana Tirinzoni	6
Qualifier 3
(Canada) Suzanne Birt	6
(Switzerland) Silvana Tirinzoni	7

Second Knockout
(Germany) Juliane Jacoby	4
(Russia) Anna Sidorova	6
(Switzerland) Manuela Siegrist	8
(Switzerland) Leandra Mueller	2

Quarterfinals
(Russia) Anna Sidorova	6
(Czech Republic) Martina Strnadová	5
(Canada) Jan Betker	9
(Switzerland) Manuela Siegrist	2

Semifinals
(Russia) Anna Sidorova	1
(Canada) Chelsea Carey	6
(Czech Republic) Anna Kubešková	5
(Canada) Jan Betker	8

To Qualifier 4
(Canada) Chelsea Carey	4
(Canada) Jan Betker	8

Second Knockout
(Switzerland) Binia Feltscher	6
(Switzerland) Melanie Wild	5
(Scotland) Hannah Fleming	7
(Latvia) Evita Regza	8

Quarterfinals
(Switzerland) Binia Feltscher	10
(Canada) Cathy Overton-Clapham	6
(Germany) Andrea Schöpp	7
(Latvia) Evita Regza	3

Semifinals
(Switzerland) Binia Feltscher	0
(Germany) Andrea Schöpp	3

To Qualifier 4
(Switzerland) Mirjam Ott	6
(Germany) Andrea Schöpp	1
Qualifier 4
(Canada) Jan Betker	6
(Switzerland) Mirjam Ott	5

=== C event ===
Third Knockout
(Switzerland) Nadine Lehmann	4
(Canada) Colleen Jones	5
(Czech Republic) Martina Strnadová	4
(United States) Erika Brown	6

Quarterfinals
(Russia) Anna Sidorova	6
(Canada) Colleen Jones	3
(Switzerland) Binia Feltscher	6
(United States) Erika Brown	5

Semifinals
(Russia) Anna Sidorova	7
(Switzerland) Binia Feltscher	2

Qualifier 5
(Russia) Anna Sidorova	3
(Canada) Suzanne Birt	6

Third Knockout
(Switzerland) Melanie Barbezat	11
(Spain) Oihane Otaegi	1

Quarterfinals
(Canada) Cathy Overton-Clapham	7
(Latvia) Evita Regza	3
(Czech Republic) Anna Kubešková	7
(Switzerland) Melanie Barbezat	8

Semifinals
(Canada) Cathy Overton-Clapham	4
(Sweden) Anna Hasselborg	3
(Denmark) Lene Nielsen	8
(Switzerland) Melanie Barbezat	4

Qualifier 6
(Canada) Cathy Overton-Clapham	6
(Denmark) Lene Nielsen	4

Third Knockout
(Germany) Juliane Jacoby	8
(Switzerland) Leandra Mueller	5

Quarterfinals
' (Germany) Daniela Driendl	6
(Germany) Juliane Jacoby	2
(Switzerland) Camille Crottaz	2
(Switzerland) Manuela Siegrist	8

Semifinals
(Canada) Chelsea Carey	2
(Switzerland) Manuela Siegrist	8
(Germany) Daniela Driendl	1
(Germany) Andrea Schöpp	7

Qualifier 7
(Switzerland) Manuela Siegrist	6
(Germany) Andrea Schöpp	5

Third Knockout
(Russia) Olga Zyablikova	3
(Scotland) Sarah Reid	5
(Switzerland) Melanie Wild	6
(Scotland) Hannah Fleming	2

Quarterfinals
(Sweden) Margaretha Sigfridsson	8
(Scotland) Sarah Reid	3
(Switzerland) Corrine Bourquin	5
(Switzerland) Melanie Wild	3

Semifinals
(Sweden) Margaretha Sigfridsson	5
(Switzerland) Corrine Bourquin	2

Qualifier 8
(Sweden) Margaretha Sigfridsson	9
(Switzerland) Mirjam Ott	3

=== Consolation Event ===
Fourth Knockout
(Switzerland) Nadine Lehmann	10
(Spain) Oihane Otaegi	4
(Switzerland) Leandra Mueller	2
(Scotland) Hannah Fleming	8

Semifinals
(Switzerland) Nadine Lehmann	4
(Czech Republic) Martina Strnadová	6
(Scotland) Hannah Fleming	4
(Russia) Olga Zyablikova	5

To Consolation Cup
(Czech Republic) Martina Strnadová	2
(Russia) Olga Zyablikova	4

Semifinals
1	(Canada) Colleen Jones	2
4	(United States) Erika Brown	7
3	(Czech Republic) Anna Kubešková	5
2	(Germany) Juliane Jacoby	4

To Consolation Cup
(United States) Erika Brown	8
(Czech Republic) Anna Kubešková	3

Semifinals
1	(Scotland) Sarah Reid	10
4	(Switzerland) Melanie Wild	3
3	(Latvia) Evita Regza	3
2	(Switzerland) Camille Crottaz	8

To Consolation Cup
(Scotland) Sarah Reid	10
(Switzerland) Camille Crottaz	1

To Consolation Cup
1	(Canada) Chelsea Carey	8
2	(Sweden) Anna Hasselborg	3

=== Consolation Cup ===
Quarterfinal
(Canada) Chelsea Carey	7
(Switzerland) Binia Feltscher	5
(United States) Erika Brown	7
(Switzerland) Melanie Barbezat	3
(Scotland) Sarah Reid	9
(Germany) Daniela Driendl	1
(Russia) Olga Zyablikova	2
(Switzerland) Corrine Bourquin	4

Semifinal
(Canada) Chelsea Carey	5
(United States) Erika Brown	2
(Scotland) Sarah Reid	8
(Switzerland) Corrine Bourquin	3

Final
(Canada) Chelsea Carey	3
(Scotland) Sarah Reid	4

== Playoffs ==
Quarterfinal
(Switzerland) Michèle Jäggi	7
(Sweden) Margaretha Sigfridsson	4
(Switzerland) Silvana Tirinzoni	8
(Switzerland) Manuela Siegrist	3
(Canada) Jan Betker	5
(Canada) Suzanne Birt	8
(Canada) Jennifer Jones	8
(Canada) Cathy Overton-Clapham	2

Semifinal
(Switzerland) Michèle Jäggi	6
(Switzerland) Silvana Tirinzoni	4
(Canada) Suzanne Birt	4
(Canada) Jennifer Jones	11

Final
(Switzerland) Michèle Jäggi	5
(Canada) Jennifer Jones	3

Bronze Medal Game
1	(Switzerland) Silvana Tirinzoni	6
2	(Canada) Suzanne Birt	8
