= 2014 International Bernese Ladies Cup =

World Curling Tour event

- Host city: Bern, Switzerland
- Arena: Curlingbahn Allmend
- Dates: January 10–12
- Winner: (Scotland) Eve Muirhead
- Curling club: Dunkeld CC, Pitlochry
- Skip: Eve Muirhead
- Third: Anna Sloan
- Second: Vicki Adams
- Lead: Claire Hamilton
- Finalist: (Russia) Anna Sidorova

The 2014 International Bernese Ladies Cup was held from January 10 to 12 at the Curlingbahn Allmend in Bern, Switzerland as part of the 2013–14 World Curling Tour. The event was held in a triple-knockout format, and the purse for the event was CHF 20,500, of which the winner, Eve Muirhead, received CHF 6,000. Muirhead defeated Anna Sidorova of Russia in the final with a score of 6–3.

== Teams ==
The teams are listed as follows:

Skip	Third	Second	Lead	Alternate	Locale
Erika Brown	Debbie McCormick	Jessica Schultz	Ann Swisshelm		(United States) Madison, Wisconsin
Madeleine Dupont	Denise Dupont	Christine Svensen	Lina Knudsen		Denmark
Binia Feltscher	Irene Schori	Franziska Kaufmann	Christine Urech		Switzerland
Hannah Fleming	Jennifer Dodds	Alice Spence	Abi Brown		Scotland
Vendy Blazkova (fourth)	Fabienne Fürbringer (skip)	Sina Wettstein	Nora Baumann		Uitikon, Switzerland
Michelle Gribi	Lisa Gisler	Chantal Bugnon	Vera Camponono		Biel, Switzerland
Iveta Janatová (fourth)	Zuzana Hájková (skip)	Alžběta Baudyšová	Klara Platonová	Elisa Jrnska	Czech Republic
Ursi Hegner	Nina Ledergerber	Chantal Schmid	Claudia Baumann	Sarah Vogel	Uzwil, Switzerland
Michèle Jäggi	Marisa Winkelhausen	Stéphanie Jäggi	Melanie Barbezat		Bern, Switzerland
Angelina Jensen	Camilla Jensen	Ane Hansen	Paula Rubasova	Caroline Jalo	Denmark
Linda Klímová	Kamila Mošová	Katerina Urbanová	Kateřina Samueliová		Czech Republic
Julia Portunova (fourth)	Alina Kovaleva (skip)	Uliana Vasilyeva	Anastacia Bryzgalova		Moscow, Russia
Isabelle Maillard	Christelle Moura	Anne Grandjean	Camille Hornisberger	Pauline Jeanneret	Lausanne, Switzerland
Corina Mani	Rahel Thoma	Jana Stritt	Tamara Michel	Briar Hürlimann	Bern, Switzerland
Sara McManus (fourth)	Jonna McManus (skip)	Anna Huhta	Sofia Mabergs		Gävle, Sweden
Mari Motohashi	Yurika Yoshida	Yumi Suzuki	Megumi Mabuchi		Kitami, Japan
Eve Muirhead	Anna Sloan	Vicki Adams	Claire Hamilton		Stirling, Scotland
Lene Nielsen	Helle Simonsen	Jeanne Ellegaard	Maria Poulsen		Hvidovre, Denmark
Cissi Östlund	Sabina Kraupp	Sara Carlsson	Paulina Stein		Karlstad, Sweden
Oihane Otaegi	Carole Howald	Leire Otaegi	Asuncion Manterola		Spain
Mirjam Ott	Carmen Schäfer	Carmen Küng	Janine Greiner		Davos, Switzerland
Alina Pätz	Nadine Lehmann	Nicole Schwägli	Nicole Dünki		Basel, Switzerland
Evita Regža	Dace Regža	Ieva Bērziņa	Žaklīna Litauniece		Jelgava, Latvia
Andrea Schöpp	Imogen Oona Lehmann	Monika Wagner	Kerstin Ruch		Garmisch-Partenkirchen, Germany
Anna Sidorova	Liudmila Privivkova	Margarita Fomina	Ekaterina Galkina	Nkeiruka Ezekh	Moscow, Russia
Maria Prytz (fourth)	Christina Bertrup	Maria Wennerström	Margaretha Sigfridsson (skip)		Härnösand, Sweden
Elena Stern	Anna Stern	Noëlle Iseli	Tanja Schwegler		Switzerland
Silvana Tirinzoni	Marlene Albrecht	Esther Neuenschwander	Manuela Siegrist		Aarau, Switzerland
Lorna Vevers	Sarah Reid	Rebecca Kesley	Rachel Hannen		Scotland
Wang Bingyu	Liu Yin	Yue Qingshuang	Zhou Yan		Harbin, China
Julia Guzieva (fourth)	Galina Arsenkina	Olga Zharkova (skip)	Oksana Gertova	Ekaterina Sharapova	Moscow, Russia
Marianne Zürcher	Cristina Lestander	Tanja Santschi	Roxane Héritier		Bern, Switzerland

== Knockout results ==
The draw is as follows:

=== A event ===
First Knockout
(Sweden) Margaretha Sigfridsson	8
(Switzerland) Corinna Mani	5
(Switzerland) Binia Feltscher	3
(Scotland) Hannah Fleming	5
(Japan) Mari Motohashi	2
(Sweden) Jonna McManus	4
(Latvia) Evita Regža	2
(Switzerland) Silvana Tirinzoni	7
(Switzerland) Marianne Zürcher	8
(Switzerland) Ursi Hegner	4
(Germany) Andrea Schöpp	4
(Czech Republic) Linda Klímová	2
(Denmark) Lene Nielsen	2
(Russia) Olga Zharkova	8
(Switzerland) Isabelle Maillard	2
(Scotland) Eve Muirhead	7

Quarterfinals
(Sweden) Margaretha Sigfridsson	6
(Scotland) Hannah Fleming	7
(Sweden) Jonna McManus	5
(Switzerland) Silvana Tirinzoni	7
(Switzerland) Marianne Zürcher	3
(Germany) Andrea Schöpp	8
(Russia) Olga Zharkova	4
(Scotland) Eve Muirhead	6

Semifinals
(Scotland) Hannah Fleming	1
(Switzerland) Silvana Tirinzoni	7
(Germany) Andrea Schöpp	3
(Scotland) Eve Muirhead	2

Qualifier 1
(Switzerland) Silvana Tirinzoni	5
(Germany) Andrea Schöpp	6

First Knockout
(Switzerland) Michèle Jäggi	6
(Czech Republic) Zuzana Hájková	3
(Sweden) Cissi Östlund	4
(Switzerland) Alina Pätz	7
(Scotland) Lorna Vevers	5
(Russia) Alina Kovaleva	6
(Switzerland) Fabienne Fürbringer	5
(United States) Erika Brown	7
(Switzerland) Mirjam Ott	7
(Spain) Oihane Otaegi	3
(China) Wang Bingyu	1
(Denmark) Angelina Jensen	8
(Switzerland) Elena Stern	6
(Denmark) Madeleine Dupont	2
(Switzerland) Michelle Gribi	2
(Russia) Anna Sidorova	4

Quarterfinals
(Switzerland) Michèle Jäggi	4
(Switzerland) Alina Pätz	6
(Russia) Alina Kovaleva	3
(United States) Erika Brown	8
(Switzerland) Mirjam Ott	8
(Denmark) Angelina Jensen	1
(Switzerland) Elena Stern	5
(Russia) Anna Sidorova	6

Semifinals
(Switzerland) Alina Pätz	7
(United States) Erika Brown	5
(Switzerland) Mirjam Ott	5
(Russia) Anna Sidorova	3

Qualifier 2
(Switzerland) Alina Pätz	6
(Switzerland) Mirjam Ott	4

=== B event ===
Second Knockout
(Switzerland) Corinna Mani	7
(Switzerland) Binia Feltscher	8
(Japan) Mari Motohashi	4
(Latvia) Evita Regža	5

Quarterfinals
(Switzerland) Binia Feltscher	6
(Switzerland) Marianne Zürcher	4
(Russia) Olga Zharkova	8
(Latvia) Evita Regža	4

Semifinals
(Switzerland) Binia Feltscher	7
(United States) Erika Brown	5
(Russia) Anna Sidorova	9
(Russia) Olga Zharkova	8

To Qualifier 3
(Switzerland) Binia Feltscher	5
(Russia) Anna Sidorova	6
Qualifier 3
(Russia) Anna Sidorova	6
(Switzerland) Mirjam Ott	5

Second Knockout
(Switzerland) Ursi Hegner	5
(Czech Republic) Linda Klímová	11
(Denmark) Lene Nielsen	4
(Switzerland) Isabelle Maillard	7

Quarterfinals
(Czech Republic) Linda Klímová	3
(Sweden) Margaretha Sigfridsson	8
(Sweden) Jonna McManus	7
(Switzerland) Isabelle Maillard	5

Semifinals
(Sweden) Margaretha Sigfridsson	8
(Sweden) Jonna McManus	0

To Qualifier 3
(Switzerland) Mirjam Ott	6
(Sweden) Margaretha Sigfridsson	2

Second Knockout
(Czech Republic) Zuzana Hájková	3
(Sweden) Cissi Östlund	7
(Scotland) Lorna Vevers	10
(Switzerland) Fabienne Fürbringer	6

Quarterfinals
(Sweden) Cissi Östlund	6
(Denmark) Angelina Jensen	7
(Switzerland) Elena Stern	6
(Scotland) Lorna Vevers	5

Semifinals
(Denmark) Angelina Jensen	3
(Scotland) Eve Muirhead	8
(Scotland) Hannah Fleming	4
(Switzerland) Elena Stern	6

To Qualifier 4
(Scotland) Eve Muirhead	7
(Switzerland) Elena Stern	1
Qualifier 4
(Scotland) Eve Muirhead	10
(Switzerland) Silvana Tirinzoni	3

Second Knockout
(Spain) Oihane Otaegi	3
(China) Wang Bingyu	9
(Denmark) Madeleine Dupont	11
(Switzerland) Michelle Gribi	3

Quarterfinals
(China) Wang Bingyu	7
(Switzerland) Michèle Jäggi	0
(Russia) Alina Kovaleva	6
(Denmark) Madeleine Dupont	3

Semifinals
(China) Wang Bingyu	8
(Russia) Alina Kovaleva	5

To Qualifier 4
(Switzerland) Silvana Tirinzoni	6
(China) Wang Bingyu	5

=== C event ===
Third Knockout
(Switzerland) Corinna Mani	8
(Japan) Mari Motohashi	5
(Sweden) Cissi Östlund	10
(Switzerland) Isabelle Maillard	1

Quarterfinals
(Denmark) Angelina Jensen	5
(Switzerland) Corinna Mani	3
(Russia) Alina Kovaleva	5
(Sweden) Cissi Östlund	3

Semifinals
(Denmark) Angelina Jensen	1
(Russia) Alina Kovaleva	6

Qualifier 5
(Russia) Alina Kovaleva	1
(Switzerland) Mirjam Ott	10

Third Knockout
(Switzerland) Ursi Hegner	5
(Denmark) Lene Nielsen	7

Quarterfinals
(Switzerland) Michèle Jäggi	8
(Denmark) Madeleine Dupont	2
(Scotland) Hannah Fleming	4
(Denmark) Lene Nielsen	7

Semifinals
(Switzerland) Michèle Jäggi	3
(Sweden) Margaretha Sigfridsson	8
(Denmark) Lene Nielsen	5
(Switzerland) Binia Feltscher	6

Qualifier 6
(Sweden) Margaretha Sigfridsson	1
(Switzerland) Binia Feltscher	9

Third Knockout
(Czech Republic) Zuzana Hájková	6
(Switzerland) Fabienne Fürbringer	7

Quarterfinals
(Russia) Olga Zharkova	3
(Switzerland) Fabienne Fürbringer	4
(Latvia) Evita Regža	3
(Scotland) Lorna Vevers	10

Semifinals
(Switzerland) Fabienne Fürbringer	2
(China) Wang Bingyu	8
(Scotland) Lorna Vevers	3
(Switzerland) Elena Stern	5

Qualifier 7
(China) Wang Bingyu	7
(Switzerland) Elena Stern	4

Third Knockout
(Switzerland) Marianne Zürcher	3
(Czech Republic) Linda Klímová	9
(Spain) Oihane Otaegi	3
(Switzerland) Michelle Gribi	6

Quarterfinals
(Sweden) Jonna McManus	11
(Czech Republic) Linda Klímová	5
(United States) Erika Brown	6
(Switzerland) Michelle Gribi	2

Semifinals
(Sweden) Jonna McManus	8
(United States) Erika Brown	3

Qualifier 8
(Sweden) Jonna McManus	0
(Switzerland) Silvana Tirinzoni	8

== Playoffs ==
Quarterfinals
(Switzerland) Alina Pätz	1
(Switzerland) Silvana Tirinzoni	5
(Russia) Anna Sidorova	6
(China) Wang Bingyu	4
(Scotland) Eve Muirhead	7
(Switzerland) Mirjam Ott	6
(Germany) Andrea Schöpp	4
(Switzerland) Binia Feltscher	3

Semifinals
(Switzerland) Silvana Tirinzoni	1
(Russia) Anna Sidorova	7
(Scotland) Eve Muirhead	6
(Germany) Andrea Schöpp	5

Final
(Russia) Anna Sidorova	3
(Scotland) Eve Muirhead	6
Third place
(Switzerland) Silvana Tirinzoni	3
(Germany) Andrea Schöpp	4
