= 2012 Women's Masters Basel =

2012 women's curling tournament

Coordinates: 47°29′54.5″N 7°36′54.4″E

- Host city: Basel, Switzerland
- Arena: Curlingzentrum Region Basel
- Dates: October 12–14
- Winner: (Sweden) Margaretha Sigfridsson
- Curling club: Umeå CK, Umeå
- Skip: Margaretha Sigfridsson
- Fourth: Maria Prytz
- Third: Christina Bertrup
- Second: Maria Wennerström
- Finalist: (Switzerland) Silvana Tirinzoni

The 2012 Women's Masters Basel were held from October 12 to 14 at the Curlingzentrum Region Basel in Basel, Switzerland as part of the 2012–13 World Curling Tour. The event was held in a triple knockout format, and the purse for the event was 32,000 CHF, of which the winner, Margaretha Sigfridsson, received 10,000 CHF. Sigfridsson won her second straight Women's Masters Basel title with a 6–3 win over Silvana Tirinzoni in the final.

== Teams ==
The teams are listed as follows:

Skip	Third	Second	Lead	Alternate	Locale
Madeleine Dupont	Denise Dupont	Christine Svensen	Lina Knudsen		Denmark
Binia Feltscher	Irene Schori	Franziska Kaufmann	Christine Urech		Switzerland
Hannah Fleming	Lauren Gray	Jennifer Dodds	Abi Brown		Scotland
Diana Gaspari	Giorgia Apollonio	Chiara Olivieri	Claudia Alvera	Federica Apollonio	Italy
Oxana Gertova	Alina Kovaleva	Alina Biktimirova	Olesya Gluschenko	Julia Portunova	Russia
Linn Githmark	Pia Trulsen	Henriette Lövar	Camilla Grøseth	Elisa Patono	Norway
Anna Hasselborg	Karin Rudström	Agnes Knochenhauer	Zandra Flyg		Sweden
Juliane Jacoby	Franziska Fischer	Josephine Obermann	Sibylle Maier		Germany
Michèle Jäggi	Marisa Winkelhausen	Stéphanie Jäggi	Malanie Barbezät		Bern, Switzerland
Linda Klímová	Lenka Černovská	Kamila Mošová	Katerina Urbanová	Alžběta Baudyšová	Czech Republic
Sanna Puustinen (fourth)	Anne Malmi (skip)	Heidi Hossi	Marjo Hippi		Finland
Eve Muirhead	Anna Sloan	Vicki Adams	Claire Hamilton		Stirling, Scotland
Anette Norberg	Cecilia Östlund	Sabina Kraupp	Sara Carlsson		Harnosand, Sweden
Mirjam Ott	Carmen Schäfer	Carmen Küng	Janine Greiner		Davos, Switzerland
Melanie Wild (fourth)	Sandra Ramstein-Attinger (skip)	Daniela Rupp	Janine Wyss		Dübendorf, Switzerland
Andrea Schöpp	Imogen Oona Lehmann	Corinna Scholz	Stella Heiß		Germany
Anna Sidorova	Liudmilla Privivkova	Margarita Fomina	Ekaterina Galkina	Nkeiruka Ezekh	Moscow, Russia
Manuela Siegrist	Alina Pätz	Nadine Lehmann	Nicole Dünki		Basel, Switzerland
Maria Prytz (fourth)	Christina Bertrup	Maria Wennerström	Margaretha Sigfridsson (skip)		Umea, Sweden
Martina Strnadová	Zuzana Hájková	Iveta Janatová	Eva Malková	Petra Vinsová	Czech Republic
Ildikó Szekeres	Alexandra Béres	Ágnes Patonai	Boglárka Ádám		Hungary
Silvana Tirinzoni	Marlene Albrecht	Esther Neuenschwander	Sandra Gantenbein		Switzerland
Lorna Vevers	Sarah Reid	Alice Spence	Kay Adams		Scotland
Olga Zharkova	Julia Portunova	Alisa Tregub	Julia Guzieva	Ekaterina Sharapova	Moscow, Russia

== Knockout results ==
The draw is listed as follows:

=== A event ===
First Knockout		Semifinals		Qualifier 1
(Russia) Anna Sidorova	7
(Czech Republic) Anna Klímová	4	(Russia) Anna Sidorova	5
(Switzerland) Binia Feltscher	9	(Switzerland) Binia Feltscher	3
(Finland) Anna Malmi	4			(Russia) Anna Sidorova	7
(Czech Republic) Martina Strnadová	4			(Scotland) Lorna Vevers	4
(Sweden) Anna Hasselborg	8	(Sweden) Anna Hasselborg	2
(Switzerland) Mirjam Ott	5	(Scotland) Lorna Vevers	6
(Scotland) Lorna Vevers	7

First Knockout		Semifinals		Qualifier 2
(Sweden) Margaretha Sigfridsson	10
(Hungary) Ildikó Szekeres	3	(Sweden) Margaretha Sigfridsson	6
(Scotland) Hannah Fleming	8	(Scotland) Hannah Fleming	5
(Switzerland) Melanie Wild	6			(Sweden) Margaretha Sigfridsson	5
(Germany) Andrea Schöpp	5			(Germany) Andrea Schöpp	1
(Norway) Linn Githmark	3	(Germany) Andrea Schöpp	6
(Switzerland) Michèle Jäggi	3	(Russia) Olga Zharkova	4
(Russia) Olga Zharkova	7

First Knockout		Semifinals		Qualifier 3
(Scotland) Eve Muirhead	7
(Germany) Juliane Jacoby	4	(Scotland) Eve Muirhead	5
(Denmark) Madeleine Dupont	6	(Switzerland) Manuela Siegrist	6
(Switzerland) Manuela Siegrist	7			(Switzerland) Manuela Siegrist	3
(Switzerland) Silvana Tirinzoni	6			(Switzerland) Silvana Tirinzoni	5
(Italy) Diana Gaspari	4	(Switzerland) Silvana Tirinzoni	4
(Sweden) Anette Norberg	7	(Sweden) Anette Norberg	3
(Russia) Oxana Gertova	1

=== B event ===
Second Knockout
(Czech Republic) Linda Klimova	4
(Finland) Anne Malmi	7
(Czech Republic) Martina Strnadova	3
(Switzerland) Mirjam Ott	7

Quarterfinals
(Germany) Juliane Jacoby	4
(Finland) Anne Malmi	2
(Denmark) Madeleine Dupont	2
(Switzerland) Mirjam Ott	7

Semifinals
(Germany) Juliane Jacoby	0
(Russia) Olga Jarkova	7
(Switzerland) Mirjam Ott	7
(Sweden) Anette Norberg	3

To Qualifier 4
(Russia) Olga Jarkova	7
(Switzerland) Mirjam Ott	5

Second Knockout
(Hungary) Ildikó Szekeres	4
(Switzerland) Melanie Wild	6

Quarterfinals
(Italy) Diana Gaspari	7
(Switzerland) Melanie Wild	2

Semifinals
(Italy) Diana Gaspari	5
(Sweden) Anna Hasselborg	8

To Qualifier 4
(Sweden) Anna Hasselborg	4
(Germany) Andrea Schöpp	0
Qualifier 4
(Russia) Olga Jarkova	8
(Sweden) Anna Hasselborg	2

Second Knockout		To Qualifier 5
(Scotland) Hannah Fleming	6
(Scotland) Eve Muirhead	3	(Scotland) Hannah Fleming	7
		(Scotland) Lorna Vevers	8

Second Knockout
(Norway) Linn Githmark	9
(Switzerland) Michèle Jäggi	5

Quarterfinals
(Russia) Oxana Gertova	5
(Norway) Linn Githmark	7

Semifinals
(Switzerland) Binia Feltscher	7
(Norway) Linn Githmark	2

To Qualifier 5
(Switzerland) Binia Feltscher	8
(Switzerland) Manuela Siegrist	4
Qualifier 5
(Scotland) Lorna Vevers	5
(Switzerland) Binia Feltscher	4

=== C event ===
Third Knockout		Semifinals		Qualifier 6
(Germany) Juliane Jacoby	0
(Scotland) Eve Muirhead	10	(Switzerland) Manuela Siegrist	1
		(Scotland) Eve Muirhead	7
				(Scotland) Eve Muirhead	4
				(Sweden) Anna Hasselborg	5

Third Knockout
(Czech Republic) Martina Strnadová	2
(Hungary) Ildikó Szekeres	6

Quarterfinals
(Hungary) Ildikó Szekeres	2
(Finland) Anne Malmi	5

Semifinals
(Finland) Anne Malmi	5
(Norway) Linn Githmark	3

To Qualifier 7
(Finland) Anne Malmi	0
(Scotland) Hannah Fleming	7

Third Knockout
(Czech Republic) Linda Klímová	2
(Switzerland) Michèle Jäggi	8

Quarterfinals
(Switzerland) Michèle Jäggi	9
(Denmark) Madeleine Dupont	6

Semifinals
(Italy) Diana Gaspari	3
(Switzerland) Michèle Jäggi	9

To Qualifier 7
(Switzerland) Michèle Jäggi	7
(Switzerland) Mirjam Ott	3
Qualifier 7
(Scotland) Hannah Fleming	1
(Switzerland) Michèle Jäggi	7

Third Knockout
(Switzerland) Melanie Wild	2
(Russia) Oxana Gertova	8

Quarterfinals
(Sweden) Anette Norberg	4
(Russia) Oxana Gertova	5

Semifinals
(Russia) Oxana Gertova	5
(Germany) Andrea Schöpp	6

Qualifier 8
(Germany) Andrea Schöpp	4
(Switzerland) Binia Feltscher	6

== Playoffs ==
Quarterfinals
(Russia) Anna Sidorova	8
(Switzerland) Binia Feltscher	5
(Switzerland) Silvana Tirinzoni	6
(Sweden) Anna Hasselborg	2
(Russia) Olga Jarkova	4
(Scotland) Lorna Vevers	5
(Sweden) Margaretha Sigfridsson	6
(Switzerland) Michèle Jäggi	2

Semifinals
(Russia) Anna Sidorova	2
(Switzerland) Silvana Tirinzoni	5
(Scotland) Lorna Vevers	2
(Sweden) Margaretha Sigfridsson	6

Final
(Switzerland) Silvana Tirinzoni	3
(Sweden) Margaretha Sigfridsson	6
