= 2013 International Bernese Ladies Cup =

World Curling Tour event

- Host city: Bern, Switzerland
- Arena: Curlingbahn Allmend
- Dates: January 11–13
- Winner: (Switzerland) Silvana Tirinzoni
- Curling club: CC Aarau, Aarau, Switzerland
- Skip: Silvana Tirinzoni
- Third: Marlene Albrecht
- Second: Esther Neuenschwander
- Lead: Sandra Gantenbein
- Finalist: (Denmark) Lene Nielsen

The 2013 International Bernese Ladies Cup was held from January 11 to 13 at the Curlingbahn Allmend in Bern, Switzerland as part of the 2012–13 World Curling Tour. The event was held in a triple-knockout format, and the purse for the event was CHF20,000, of which the winner, Silvana Tirinzoni, received CHF6,000.

== Teams ==
The teams are listed as follows:

Skip	Third	Second	Lead	Locale
Mary-Anne Arsenault	Colleen Jones	Kim Kelly	Jennifer Baxter	Halifax, Canada
Erika Brown	Debbie McCormick	Jessica Schultz	Ann Swisshelm	Madison, United States
Daniela Driendl	Martina Linder	Marika Trettin	Gesa Angrick	Füssen, Germany
Madeleine Dupont	Denise Dupont	Christine Svendsen	Lina Knudsen	Hvidovre, Denmark
Binia Feltscher	Irene Schori	Franziska Kaufmann	Christine Urech	Flims, Switzerland
Hannah Fleming	Lauren Gray	Alice Spence	Abigail Brown	Stirling, Scotland
Fabienne Fürbringer	Jacqui Greiner	Nicole Glückler	Sandra Born	Uitikon, Switzerland
Anna Hasselborg	Karin Rudström	Agnes Knochenhauer	Zandra Flyg	Sundbyberg, Sweden
Ursi Hegner	Nina Ledergerber	Chantal Schmid	Claudia Baumann	Uzwil, Switzerland
Andrea Marx (fourth)	Briar Hürlimann (skip)	Sina Wettstein	Sereina Meier	Aarau, Switzerland
Michèle Jäggi	Marisa Winkelhausen	Stéphanie Jäggi	Malanie Barbezät	Bern, Switzerland
Shannon Kleibrink	Bronwen Webster	Kalynn Park	Chelsey Matson	Calgary, Canada
Linda Klímová	Kamila Mošová	Lenka Černovská	Kateřina Urbanová	Prague, Czech Republic
Anna Kubešková	Tereza Plíšková	Veronika Herdová	Eliška Jalovcová	Prague, Czech Republic
Jonna McManus	Sara McManus	Anna Huhta	Sofia Mabergs	Gävle, Sweden
Mari Motohashi	Yurika Yoshida	Megumi Mabuchi	Yumi Suzuki	Kitami, Japan
Lene Nielsen	Helle Simonsen	Jeanne Ellegaard	Maria Poulsen	Hvidovre, Denmark
Anette Norberg	Cecilia Östlund	Sabina Kraupp	Sara Carlsson	Karlstad, Sweden
Oihane Otaegi	Leire Otaegi	Iera Irazusta	Asun Manterola	Zaragoza, Spain
Cathy Overton-Clapham	Jenna Loder	Ashley Howard	Breanne Meakin	Winnipeg, Canada
Jenny Perret	Corina Mani	Rahel Thoma	Tamara Michel	Bern, Switzerland
Evita Regza	Dace Regza	Vineta Smilga	Dace Pastare	Jelgava, Latvia
Andrea Schöpp	Imogen Oona Lehmann	Corinna Scholz	Stella Heiß	Garmisch, Germany
Anna Sidorova	Liudmila Privivkova	Nkeiruka Ezekh	Ekaterina Galkina	Moscow, Russia
Manuela Siegrist	Allna Pätz	Claudia Hug	Nicole Dünki	Basel, Switzerland
Silvana Tirinzoni	Irene Schori	Esther Neuenschwander	Sandra Gantenbein	Aarau, Switzerland
Lorna Vevers	Sarah Reid	Alice Spence	Kay Adams	Stirling, Scotland
Wang Bingyu	Liu Yin	Yue Qingshuang	Zhou Yan	Harbin, China
Crystal Webster	Erin Carmody	Geri-Lynn Ramsay	Samantha Preston	Calgary, Canada
Melanie Wild	Sandra Ramstein-Attinger	Daniela Rupp	Janine Wyss	Dubendorf, Switzerland
Olga Zharkova	Julia Portunova	Alisa Tregub	Julia Guzieva	Kaliningrad, Russia

== Knockout results ==
The draw is listed as follows:

=== A event ===
First Knockout
(Canada) Shannon Kleibrink	5
(Sweden) Anette Norberg	7
(Switzerland) Manuela Siegrist	5
(Denmark) Lene Nielsen	7
(Japan) Mari Motohashi	8
(Czech Republic) Anna Kubešková	4
(Switzerland) Ursi Hegner	8
(Russia) Anna Sidorova	2
(Switzerland) Silvana Tirinzoni	4
(Latvia) Evita Regza	2
(Scotland) Hannah Fleming	9
(Switzerland) Binia Feltscher	3
(Sweden) Anna Hasselborg	6
(Germany) Daniela Driendl	4
(Switzerland) Jenny Perret	4
(Canada) Crystal Webster	5

Quarterfinals
(Sweden) Anette Norberg	7
(Denmark) Lene Nielsen	6
(Switzerland) Ursi Hegner	7
(Japan) Mari Motohashi	6
(Switzerland) Silvana Tirinzoni	5
(Scotland) Hannah Fleming	4
(Sweden) Anna Hasselborg	5
(Canada) Crystal Webster	8

Semifinals
(Sweden) Anette Norberg	8
(Switzerland) Ursi Hegner	1
(Switzerland) Silvana Tirinzoni	4
(Canada) Crystal Webster	2

Qualifier 1
(Sweden) Anette Norberg	3
(Switzerland) Silvana Tirinzoni	6

First Knockout
(Germany) Andrea Schöpp	6
(Switzerland) Fabienne Fürbringer	2
(Denmark) Madeleine Dupont	5
(Russia) Olga Zharkova	7
(Scotland) Lorna Vevers	7
(Switzerland) Melanie Wild	6
(Switzerland) Briar Hürlimann	1
(Canada) Cathy Overton-Clapham	8
(China) Wang Bingyu	3
(Russia) Oksana Gertova	10
(Sweden) Jonna McManus	6
(Canada) Mary-Anne Arsenault	8
(United States) Erika Brown	6
(Czech Republic) Linda Klímová	3
(Spain) Oihane Oitaegi	3
(Switzerland) Michèle Jäggi	7

Quarterfinals
(Germany) Andrea Schöpp	5
(Russia) Olga Zharkova	3
(Scotland) Lorna Vevers	6
(Canada) Cathy Overton-Clapham	4
(Russia) Oksana Gertova	5
(Canada) Mary-Anne Arsenault	6
(United States) Erika Brown	5
(Switzerland) Michèle Jäggi	6

Semifinals
(Germany) Andrea Schöpp	3
(Scotland) Lorna Vevers	4
(Canada) Mary-Anne Arsenault	9
(Switzerland) Michèle Jäggi	8

Qualifier 2
(Scotland) Lorna Vevers	3
(Canada) Mary-Anne Arsenault	7

=== B event ===
Second Knockout
(Canada) Shannon Kleibrink	8
(Switzerland) Manuela Siegrist	7
(Russia) Anna Sidorova	6
(Czech Republic) Anna Kubeskova	3

Quarterfinals
(Scotland) Hannah Fleming	7
(Canada) Shannon Kleibrink	4
(Sweden) Anna Hasselborg	1
(Russia) Anna Sidorova	7

Semifinals
(Scotland) Hannah Fleming	3
(Germany) Andrea Schöpp	6
(Russia) Anna Sidorova	5
(Switzerland) Michèle Jäggi	7

To Qualifier 3
(Germany) Andrea Schöpp	2
(Switzerland) Michèle Jäggi	6
Qualifier 3
(Switzerland) Michèle Jäggi	3
(Denmark) Lene Nielsen	5

Second Knockout
(Latvia) Evita Regza	2
(Switzerland) Binia Feltscher	9
(Germany) Daniela Driendl	4
(Switzerland) Jenny Perret	6

Quarterfinals
(Switzerland) Binia Feltscher	6
(Denmark) Lene Nielsen	7
(Japan) Mari Motohashi	6
(Switzerland) Jenny Perret	5

Semifinals
(Denmark) Lene Nielsen	8
(Japan) Mari Motohashi	4

To Qualifier 3
(Scotland) Lorna Vevers	4
(Denmark) Lene Nielsen	7

Second Knockout
(Switzerland) Fabienne Fürbringer	3
(Denmark) Madeleine Dupont	7
(Switzerland) Melanie Wild	7
(Switzerland) Briar Hürlimann	6

Quarterfinals
(Denmark) Madeleine Dupont	5
(Russia) Oksana Gertova	7
(United States) Erika Brown	11
(Switzerland) Melanie Wild	0

Semifinals
(Russia) Oksana Gertova	5
(Canada) Crystal Webster	8
(Switzerland) Ursi Hegner	4
(United States) Erika Brown	9

To Qualifier 4
(Canada) Crystal Webster	3
(United States) Erika Brown	7
Qualifier 4
(United States) Erika Brown	7
(Sweden) Anette Norberg	2

Second Knockout
(China) Wang Bingyu	6
(Sweden) Jonna McManus	3
(Czech Republic) Linda Klímová	11
(Spain) Oihane Otaegi	6

Quarterfinals
(China) Wang Bingyu	7
(Russia) Olga Zharkova	6
(Canada) Cathy Overton-Clapham	6
(Czech Republic) Linda Klímová	3

Semifinals
(China) Wang Bingyu	5
(Canada) Cathy Overton-Clapham	4

To Qualifier 4
(Sweden) Anette Norberg	9
(China) Wang Bingyu	7

=== C event ===
Third Knockout
(Switzerland) Manuela Siegrist	7
(Czech Republic) Anna Kubešková	5
(Denmark) Madeleine Dupont	4
(Switzerland) Jenny Perret	5

Quarterfinals
(Russia) Oksana Gertova	3
(Switzerland) Manuela Siegrist	6
(Canada) Cathy Overton-Clapham	6
(Switzerland) Jenny Perret	10

Semifinals
(Switzerland) Manuela Siegrist	6
(Switzerland) Jenny Perret	3

Qualifier 5
(Switzerland) Manuela Siegrist	4
(Switzerland) Michèle Jäggi	5

Third Knockout
(Latvia) Evita Regza	5
(Germany) Daniela Driendl	7

Quarterfinals
(Russia) Olga Zharkova	5
(Czech Republic) Linda Klímová	6
(Switzerland) Ursi Hegner	5
(Germany) Daniela Driendl	9

Semifinals
(Czech Republic) Linda Klímová	2
(Scotland) Lorna Vevers	9
(Germany) Daniela Driendl	5
(Germany) Andrea Schöpp	4

Qualifier 6
(Scotland) Lorna Vevers	8
(Germany) Daniela Driendl	5

Third Knockout
(Switzerland) Fabienne Fürbringer	4
(Switzerland) Briar Hürlimann	5

Quarterfinals
(Russia) Anna Sidorova	6
(Switzerland) Briar Hürlimann	5
(Sweden) Anna Hasselborg	8
(Switzerland) Melanie Wild	4

Semifinals
(Russia) Anna Sidorova	7
(China) Wang Bingyu	3
(Sweden) Anna Hasselborg	6
(Canada) Crystal Webster	2

Qualifier 7
(Russia) Anna Sidorova	4
(Sweden) Anna Hasselborg	5

Third Knockout
(Canada) Shannon Kleibrink	2
(Switzerland) Binia Feltscher	9
(Sweden) Jonna McManus	7
(Spain) Oihane Otaegi	3

Quarterfinals
(Japan) Mari Motohashi	8
(Switzerland) Binia Feltscher	6
(Scotland) Hannah Fleming	5
(Sweden) Jonna McManus	3

Semifinals
(Japan) Mari Motohashi	3
(Scotland) Hannah Fleming	7

Qualifier 8
(Scotland) Hannah Fleming	2
(Sweden) Anette Norberg	6

== Playoffs ==
Quarterfinals
(Canada) Mary-Anne Arsenault	5
(Sweden) Anette Norberg	4
(Denmark) Lene Nielsen	7
(Sweden) Anna Hasselborg	5
(United States) Erika Brown	10
(Switzerland) Michèle Jäggi	3
(Switzerland) Silvana Tirinzoni	7
(Scotland) Lorna Vevers	4

Semifinals
(Canada) Mary-Anne Arsenault	5
(Denmark) Lene Nielsen	7
(United States) Erika Brown	5
(Switzerland) Silvana Tirinzoni	8

Final
(Denmark) Lene Nielsen	3
(Switzerland) Silvana Tirinzoni	6

Third place game
1	(Canada) Mary-Anne Arsenault	2
2	(United States) Erika Brown	6
