= 2012 Glynhill Ladies International =

- Host city: Glasgow, Scotland
- Arena: Braehead Curling Rink
- Dates: January 20–22
- Winner: (Switzerland) Mirjam Ott
- Curling club: Davos Curling Club, Davos
- Skip: Mirjam Ott
- Third: Carmen Schäfer
- Second: Carmen Küng
- Lead: Janine Greiner
- Finalist: (Switzerland) Michèle Jäggi

The 2012 Glynhill Ladies International was held from January 20 to 22 at the Braehead Curling Rink in Glasgow, Scotland as part of the 2011–12 World Curling Tour. The purse for the event was GBP£8,000, and the winner, Mirjam Ott, received GBP£2,500. The event was held in a round robin format with a consolation round and playoffs.

== Teams ==
| Skip | Third | Second | Lead | Locale |
|---|---|---|---|---|
| Kerry Barr | Helen King | Rhiann Macleod | Caitlin Barr | Perth, Scotland |
| Daniela Driendl | Martina Linder | Marika Trettin | Gesa Angrick | Germany |
| Binia Feltscher | Marlene Albrecht | Franziska Kaufmann | Christine Urech | Switzerland |
| Linn Githmark | Henriette Løvar | Ingrid Stensrud | Kristin Skaslien | Norway |
| Zuzana Hájková | Pavla Proksiková | Iveta Janatová | Eva Malková | Prague, Czech Republic |
| Anna Hasselborg | Sabina Kraupp | Margaretha Dryburgh | Zandra Flyg | Sundbyberg, Sweden |
| Juliane Jacoby | Franziska Fischer | Josephine Obertsdorf | Martina Fink | Germany |
| Michèle Jäggi | Marisa Winkelhausen | Stéphanie Jäggi | Nicole Schwälgi | Bern, Switzerland |
| Hedvig Kamp | Camilla Johansson | Sigrid Kamp | Isabell Andersson | Uppsala, Sweden |
| Sanna Puustinen (fourth) | Heidi Hossi | Eszter Juhász | Oona Kauste (skip) | Finland |
| Linda Klímová | Lenka Černovská | Kamila Mošová | Katerina Urbanová | Czech Republic |
| Jackie Lockhart | Karen Kennedy | Kay Adams | Sarah Macintyre | Edinburgh, Scotland |
| Jennifer Martin | Tasha Aitken | Fiona Telfer | Mhairi Anderson | Kilmarnock, Scotland |
| Jonna McManus | Sara McManus | Anna Huhta | Sofia Mabergs | Gävle, Sweden |
| Marissa Messier | Cindy Wood | Jennifer Gamboa | Donna Umali-Mendoza | (United States) Hollywood, California |
| Eve Muirhead | Anna Sloan | Vicki Adams | Claire Hamilton | Perth, Scotland |
| Gail Munro | Lyndsay Cumming | Kerry Adams-Taylor | | Stranraer, Scotland |
| Mirjam Ott | Carmen Schäfer | Carmen Küng | Janine Greiner | Switzerland |
| Liudmila Privivkova | Anna Sidorova | Nkeiruka Ezekh | Ekaterina Galkina | Moscow, Russia |
| Sarah Reid | Rachael Simms | Lorna Vevers | Barbara McFarlane | Glasgow, Scotland |
| Iveta Staša-Šaršūne | Zanda Bikše | Ieva Krusta | Dace Munča | Riga, Latvia |
| Silvana Tirinzoni | Irene Schori | Esther Neuenschwander | Sandra Gantenbein | Switzerland |
| Ellen Vogt | Riikka Louhivuori | Tiina Suuripää | Maija Salmiovirta | Finland |
| Olga Zyablikova | Ekaterina Antonova | Victorya Moiseeva | Galina Arsenkina | Moscow, Russia |

== Round-robin standings ==
Final round-robin standings

Key
| Teams to Playoffs |
| Teams to Consolation round |

| Pool A | W | L |
|---|---|---|
| (Switzerland) Silvana Tirinzoni | 5 | 0 |
| (Sweden) Hedvig Kamp | 3 | 2 |
| (Czech Republic) Linda Klímová | 3 | 2 |
| (Scotland) Jackie Lockhart | 2 | 2 |
| (Finland) Oona Kauste | 1 | 3 |
| (United States) Marissa Messier | 0 | 5 |

| Pool B | W | L |
|---|---|---|
| (Switzerland) Mirjam Ott | 5 | 0 |
| (Sweden) Jonna McManus | 3 | 2 |
| (Germany) Daniela Driendl | 3 | 2 |
| (Scotland) Sarah Reid | 3 | 2 |
| (Czech Republic) Zuzana Hájková | 1 | 4 |
| (Scotland) Jennifer Martin | 0 | 5 |

| Pool C | W | L |
|---|---|---|
| (Switzerland) Michèle Jäggi | 4 | 1 |
| (Russia) Liudmila Privivkova | 3 | 2 |
| (Scotland) Gail Munro | 3 | 2 |
| (Scotland) Kerry Barr | 2 | 3 |
| (Norway) Linn Githmark | 2 | 3 |
| (Germany) Juliane Jacoby | 1 | 4 |

| Pool D | W | L |
|---|---|---|
| (Russia) Olga Zyablikova | 5 | 0 |
| (Scotland) Eve Muirhead | 3 | 1 |
| (Sweden) Anna Hasselborg | 3 | 2 |
| (Switzerland) Binia Feltscher | 1 | 3 |
| (Latvia) Iveta Staša-Šaršūne | 1 | 4 |
| (Finland) Ellen Vogt | 1 | 4 |

== Consolation round ==
Semifinals
1 | (Czech Republic) Linda Klímová | 5
4 | (Scotland) Sarah Reid | 4
3 | (Scotland) Gail Munro | 4
2 | (Sweden) Anna Hasselborg | 5

Consolation final
(Czech Republic) Linda Klímová
(Sweden) Anna Hasselborg | w/o

== Playoffs ==
Quarterfinals
(Switzerland) Silvana Tirinzoni | 4
(Scotland) Eve Muirhead | 2
(Switzerland) Michèle Jäggi | 4
(Sweden) Jonna McManus | 2
(Switzerland) Mirjam Ott | 8
(Sweden) Hedvig Kamp | 4
(Russia) Olga Zyablikova | 5
(Russia) Liudmila Privivkova | 6

Semifinals
(Switzerland) Silvana Tirinzoni | 3
(Switzerland) Michèle Jäggi | 10
(Switzerland) Mirjam Ott | 8
(Russia) Liudmila Privivkova | 5

Final
(Switzerland) Michèle Jäggi | 4
(Switzerland) Mirjam Ott | 7
