= Women's Masters Basel =

Annual curling competition in Arlesheim, Switzerland

- Established: 2006
- Host city: Arlesheim, Switzerland
- Arena: Curlingzentrum Region Basel
- Purse: CHF 35,000
- 2025 champion: (Switzerland) Silvana Tirinzoni

Current edition
- 2025 Women's Masters Basel

The Women's Masters Basel (formerly the RE/MAX Women's Masters Basel and the Credit Suisse Women's Masters Basel) is an annual bonspiel, or curling tournament, that takes place at the Curlingzentrum Region Basel in Arlesheim, Switzerland. The tournament is held in a round-robin format. It was held as part of the World Curling Tour until 2024.

== Event names ==
- 2006: Women's Masters Basel
- 2007–2010: RE/MAX Women's Masters Basel
- 2011: Credit Suisse Women's Masters Basel
- 2012–present: Women's Masters Basel

== Past champions ==
Year	Winning team	Runner-up team	Purse (CHF)
2006	(Sweden) Anette Norberg, Eva Lund, Cathrine Lindahl, Anna Le Moine	(Canada) Cathy King, Lori Olson, Raylene Rocque, Diane Dealy	
2007	(Sweden) Anette Norberg, Eva Lund, Cathrine Lindahl, Anna Le Moine	(Scotland) Edith Loudon, Mairi Milne, Claire Milne, Katie Loudon	
2008	(Sweden) Anette Norberg, Eva Lund, Cathrine Lindahl, Anna Le Moine	(Scotland) Edith Loudon, Mairi Milne, Claire Milne, Katie Loudon	
2009	(Sweden) Anette Norberg, Eva Lund, Cathrine Lindahl, Anna Le Moine	(Sweden) Stina Viktorsson, Christina Bertrup, Maria Wennerström, Margaretha Sigfridsson	
2010	(Germany) Andrea Schöpp, Imogen Oona Lehmann, Monika Wagner, Stella Heiß	(Sweden) Anna Hasselborg, Sabina Kraupp, Agnes Knochenhauer, Zandra Flyg	30,000
2011	(Sweden) Maria Prytz (Fourth), Christina Bertrup, Maria Wennerström, Margaretha Sigfridsson (Skip)	(Switzerland) Mirjam Ott, Carmen Schäfer, Carmen Küng, Janine Greiner	32,050
2012	(Sweden) Maria Prytz (Fourth), Christina Bertrup, Maria Wennerström, Margaretha Sigfridsson (Skip)	(Switzerland) Silvana Tirinzoni, Marlene Albrecht, Esther Neuenschwander, Sandra Gantenbein	32,000
2013	(Switzerland) Silvana Tirinzoni, Manuela Siegrist, Esther Neuenschwander, Marlene Albrecht	(Switzerland) Mirjam Ott, Carmen Schäfer, Carmen Küng, Janine Greiner	32,100
2014	(Switzerland) Binia Feltscher, Irene Schori, Franziska Kaufmann, Christine Urech	(Switzerland) Silvana Tirinzoni, Manuela Siegrist, Esther Neuenschwander, Marlene Albrecht	32,100
2015	(Russia) Anna Sidorova, Margarita Fomina, Alexandra Raeva, Alina Kovaleva	(Switzerland) Silvana Tirinzoni, Manuela Siegrist, Esther Neuenschwander, Marlene Albrecht	32,100
2016	(Scotland) Eve Muirhead, Anna Sloan, Vicki Adams, Lauren Gray	(Sweden) Cecilia Östlund (Fourth), Christina Bertrup, Maria Wennerström, Margaretha Sigfridsson (Skip)	32,100
2017	(China) Wang Bingyu, Zhou Yan, Liu Jinli, Ma Jingyi	(Switzerland) Binia Feltscher, Irene Schori, Franziska Kaufmann, Carole Howald	32,000
2018	(Switzerland) Briar Hürlimann (Fourth), Elena Stern (Skip), Lisa Gisler, Céline Koller	(Switzerland) Binia Feltscher, Carole Howald, Stefanie Berset, Larissa Hari	32,000
2019	(Switzerland) Alina Pätz (Fourth), Silvana Tirinzoni (Skip), Esther Neuenschwander, Melanie Barbezat	(Sweden) Isabella Wranå, Jennie Wåhlin, Almida de Val, Fanny Sjöberg	32,000
2020	(Sweden) Anna Hasselborg, Sara McManus, Agnes Knochenhauer, Sofia Mabergs	(Switzerland) Selina Witschonke (Fourth), Elena Mathis, Raphaela Keiser (Skip), Marina Lörtscher	32,000
2021	(Denmark) Madeleine Dupont, Mathilde Halse, Denise Dupont, My Larsen, Lina Knudsen	(Sweden) Anna Hasselborg, Sara McManus, Agnes Knochenhauer, Sofia Mabergs	35,000
2022	(Switzerland) Selina Witschonke (Fourth), Elena Mathis, Raphaela Keiser (Skip), Marina Lörtscher	(Switzerland) Michèle Jäggi, Stefanie Berset, Lara Stocker, Sarah Müller, Irene Schori	32,000
2023	(Switzerland) Alina Pätz (Fourth), Silvana Tirinzoni (Skip), Selina Witschonke, Carole Howald	(Sweden) Anna Hasselborg, Sara McManus, Agnes Knochenhauer, Sofia Mabergs	32,000
2024	(Switzerland) Alina Pätz (Fourth), Silvana Tirinzoni (Skip), Selina Witschonke, Carole Howald	(Sweden) Anna Hasselborg, Sara McManus, Agnes Knochenhauer, Sofia Mabergs	35,000
2025	(Switzerland) Alina Pätz (Fourth), Silvana Tirinzoni (Skip), Carole Howald, Selina Witschonke	(Italy) Stefania Constantini, Veronica Zappone, Angela Romei, Marta Lo Deserto	35,000
