= 2017 City of Perth Ladies International =

2017 City Of Perth Ladies International
- Host city: Perth, Scotland
- Arena: Dewars Centre
- Dates: March 30-April 2
- Winner: (Canada) Allison Flaxey
- Skip: Allison Flaxey
- Third: Clancy Grandy
- Second: Lynn Kreviazuk
- Lead: Morgan Court
- Finalist: (Switzerland) Silvana Tirinzoni

The 2017 City of Perth Ladies International was held from March 31 to April 2 at the Dewars Centre in Perth, Scotland as part of the World Curling Tour. The event was held in a round robin format.

== Teams ==
The teams are listed as follows:

Skip	Third	Second	Lead	Locale
Gina Aitken	Rowena Karr	Rachael Halliday	Rachel Hannen	Edinburgh, Scotland
Karina Aitken	Rebecca Morrison	Hailey Duff	Laura Barr	Stirling, Scotland
Chelsea Carey	Mary-Anne Arsenault	Jocelyn Peterman	Laine Peters	(Canada) Calgary, Alberta
Binia Feltscher	Irene Schori	Franziska Kaufmann	Carole Howald	Flims, Switzerland
Allison Flaxey	Clancy Grandy	Lynn Kreviazuk	Morgan Court	(Canada) Caledon, Ontario
Hannah Fleming	Jennifer Dodds	Alice Spence	Vicky Wright	Lockerbie, Scotland
Tracy Fleury	Andrea Crawford	Jenna Walsh	Amanda Gates	(Canada) Sudbury, Ontario
Anna Fowler	Hetty Garnier	Angharad Ward	Lauren Pearce	Kent, England
Satsuki Fujisawa	Mari Motohashi	Chinami Yoshida	Yurika Yoshida	Kitami, Japan
Lisa Gisler	Corina Mani	Sina Wettstein	Janine Wyss	Bern, Switzerland
Mari Hansen	Elina Virtallaa	Janina Lindstrom	Ulla Sten	Hyvinkää, Finland
Ursi Hegner	Imogen Oona Lehmann	Nina Ledergeber	Claudia Baumann	Uzwil, Switzerland
Sophie Jackson	Naomi Brown	Mili Smith	Sophie Sinclair	Dumfries, Scotland
Daniela Jentsch	Analena Jentsch	Josephine Obermann	Pia-Lisa Scholl	Füssen, Germany
Amy MacDonald	Amy Bryce	Eilidh Yeats	Layla al-Saffar	Moray, Scotland
Sherry Middaugh	Jo-Ann Rizzo	Carly Howard	Leigh Armstrong	(Canada) Coldwater, Ontario
Claire Milne	Mairi Milne	Lynn Cameron-Thompson	Rachael Simms	Perth, Scotland
Eve Muirhead	Anna Sloan	Vicki Adams	Lauren Gray	Perth, Scotland
Jamie Sinclair	Alexandra Carlson	Vicky Persinger	Monica Walker	(United States) Blaine, Minnesota
Hazel Smith	Sarah Reid	Laura Ritchie	Claire Hamilton	Stirling, Scotland
Marta Szeliga-Frynia	Adela Walczak	Zuzanna Rybicka	Maria Stefanska	Łódź, Poland
Julie Tippin	Chantal Duahaime	Rachelle Vink	Tess Bobbie	(Canada) Woodstock, Ontario
Silvana Tirinzoni	Manuela Siegrist	Esther Neuenschwander	Marlene Albrecht	Zürich, Switzerland
Isabella Wranå	Jennie Wåhlin	Almida de Val	Fanny Sjöberg	Sundbyberg, Sweden

== Round robin standings ==
Key
Teams to Playoffs

Ties in the standings are broken first by head-to-head results then by the total distance of the best four pre-game LSD ("last stone draws" - shots taken to determine hammer in the first end) from five.

Pool A	W	L	LSD
(Switzerland) Silvana Tirinzoni	4	1	220
(Canada) Julie Tippin	3	2	135.2
(Scotland) Hazel Smith	3	2	141.9
(Sweden) Isabella Wranå	3	2	169.8
(Scotland) Sophie Jackson	2	3	132
(Finland) Mari Hansen	0	5	465.4

Pool B	W	L	LSD
(Canada) Allison Flaxey	4	1	175
(Switzerland) Binia Feltscher	3	2	231.9
(Scotland) Hannah Fleming	2	3	181.1
(England) Anna Fowler	2	3	198.3
(Germany) Daniela Jentsch	2	3	200.5
(Scotland) Karina Aitken	2	3	404.8

Pool C	W	L	LSD
(Canada) Sherry Middaugh	4	1	159.3
(United States) Jamie Sinclair	4	1	226.6
(Scotland) Eve Muirhead	3	2	306.6
(Scotland) Gina Aitken	2	3	296.9
(Switzerland) Ursi Hegner	2	3	379.6
(Poland) Marta Szeliga-Frynia	0	5	278.6

Pool D	W	L	LSD
(Japan) Satsuki Fujisawa	5	0	203.2
(Canada) Tracy Fleury	4	1	213.2
(Canada) Chelsea Carey	2	3	242.4
(Switzerland) Lisa Gisler	2	3	352.9
(Scotland) Amy MacDonald	1	4	237
(Scotland) Claire Milne	1	4	532

== Playoffs ==
Quarterfinals
(Switzerland) Silvana Tirinzoni	8
(United States) Jamie Sinclair	4
(Japan) Satsuki Fujisawa	3
(Switzerland) Binia Feltscher	4
(Canada) Sherry Middaugh	2
(Canada) Julie Tippin	4
(Canada) Tracy Fleury	5
(Canada) Allison Flaxey	6

Semifinals
(Switzerland) Silvana Tirinzoni	6
(Switzerland) Binia Feltscher	3
(Canada) Julie Tippin	4
(Canada) Allison Flaxey	7

Finals
(Switzerland) Silvana Tirinzoni	3
(Canada) Allison Flaxey	4
