= 2014 World Women's Curling Championship =

- Host city: Saint John, New Brunswick, Canada
- Arena: Harbour Station
- Dates: 15–23 March
- Attendance: 44,316
- Winner: Switzerland
- Curling club: Flims CC, Flims
- Skip: Binia Feltscher
- Third: Irene Schori
- Second: Franziska Kaufmann
- Lead: Christine Urech
- Alternate: Carole Howald
- Coach: Al Moore
- Finalist: Canada (Rachel Homan)

The 2014 World Women's Curling Championship (branded as Ford World Women's Curling Championship 2014 for sponsorship reasons) was held from 15 to 23 March at the Harbour Station in Saint John, New Brunswick.

In the final, Switzerland, skipped by Binia Feltscher upset the host Canadian team, skipped by Rachel Homan in a surprise win, 9–5. Canada led 5–3 after the seventh end, but errors made by the team in the eighth end caused the Swiss to score a three-ender, giving the Swiss a 6–5 lead. Canada made more mistakes in the ninth, leading Homan to attempt a very difficult angle raise double takeout on her last, which she missed, giving up another three-ender, the first steal of three the team gave up in the tournament. Canada finished first in the round robin with a 10–1 record, their only loss coming against the same Swiss team. It was the second gold medal for Switzerland in the previous three years.

== Qualification ==
The following nations are qualified to participate in the 2014 World Women's Curling Championship:

- Canada (host country)
- One team from the Americas zone
  - United States (given that no challenges in the Americas zone are issued)
- Eight teams from the 2013 European Curling Championships
  - Czech Republic
  - Denmark
  - Latvia
  - Russia
  - Scotland
  - Sweden
  - Switzerland
  - Germany
- Two teams from the 2013 Pacific-Asia Curling Championships
  - China
  - South Korea

== Teams ==
Canada	China	Czech Republic
Ottawa CC, Ottawa Skip: Rachel Homan; Third: Emma Miskew; Second: Alison Kreviazuk; Lead: Lisa Weagle; Alternate: Stephanie LeDrew	Harbin CC, Harbin Skip: Liu Sijia; Third: Jiang Yilun; Second: Wang Rui; Lead: Liu Jinli; Alternate: She Qiutong	CC Sokol Liboc, Prague Skip: Anna Kubešková; Third: Tereza Plíšková; Second: Klára Svatoňová; Lead: Veronika Herdová; Alternate: Alžběta Baudyšová
Denmark	Germany	Latvia
Hvidovre CC, Hvidovre Skip: Madeleine Dupont; Third: Denise Dupont; Second: Christine Svensen; Lead: Lina Almindingen Knudsen; Alternate: Isabella Clemmensen	SC Riessersee, Garmisch-Partenkirchen Skip: Imogen Oona Lehmann; Third: Corinna Scholz; Second: Nicole Muskatewitz; Lead: Stella Heiß; Alternate: Claudia Beer	SC OndulatB, Riga Skip: Evita Regža; Third: Dace Regža; Second: Ieva Bērziņa; Lead: Žaklīna Litauniece; Alternate: Iluta Linde
Russia	Scotland	South Korea
Moskvitch CC, Moscow Skip: Anna Sidorova; Third: Margarita Fomina; Second: Aleksandra Saitova; Lead: Ekaterina Galkina; Alternate: Nkeiruka Ezekh	Currie and Balerno CC, Edinburgh Skip: Kerry Barr; Third: Rachael Simms; Second: Rhiann Macleod; Lead: Barbara McPake; Alternate: Hannah Fleming	Gyeonggi-do CC, Gyeonggi Fourth: Gim Un-chi; Skip: Kim Ji-sun; Second: Lee Seul-bee; Lead: Um Min-ji; Alternate: Shin Mi-sung
Sweden	Switzerland	United States
Skellefteå CK, Skellefteå Fourth: Maria Prytz; Third: Christina Bertrup; Second: Maria Wennerström; Skip: Margaretha Sigfridsson; Alternate: Sara McManus	Flims CC, Flims Skip: Binia Feltscher; Third: Irene Schori; Second: Franziska Kaufmann; Lead: Christine Urech; Alternate: Carole Howald	St. Paul CC, St. Paul Skip: Allison Pottinger; Third: Nicole Joraanstad; Second: Natalie Nicholson; Lead: Tabitha Peterson; Alternate: Tara Peterson

== Round-robin standings ==
Final round-robin standings

Key
Teams to Playoffs
Teams to Tiebreaker

Locale	Skip	W	L	PF	PA	Ends Won	Ends Lost	Blank Ends	Stolen Ends	Shot Pct.
Canada	Rachel Homan	10	1	82	47	48	36	12	13	84%
Switzerland	Binia Feltscher	9	2	78	50	49	36	12	18	78%
Russia	Anna Sidorova	8	3	84	50	47	37	13	14	83%
South Korea	Kim Ji-sun	8	3	81	70	47	44	9	14	77%
Sweden	Margaretha Sigfridsson	8	3	90	56	47	39	11	9	82%
United States	Allison Pottinger	6	5	78	66	46	44	10	15	80%
China	Liu Sijia	6	5	70	74	48	43	9	12	77%
Germany	Imogen Oona Lehmann	3	8	58	76	45	44	15	16	71%
Czech Republic	Anna Kubešková	3	8	65	80	42	51	11	12	72%
Scotland	Kerry Barr	2	9	50	89	33	58	3	7	69%
Denmark	Madeleine Dupont	2	9	58	85	49	49	5	10	73%
Latvia	Evita Regza	1	10	41	92	32	52	8	2	69%

== Round-robin results ==
All draw times are listed in Atlantic Standard Time (UTC−4).

=== Draw 1 ===
Saturday, 15 March, 14:30

Sheet A	1	2	3	4	5	6	7	8	9	10	Final
Scotland (Barr)	1	0	2	0	1	0	1	1	0	X	6
Latvia (Regza)	0	2	0	1	0	2	0	0	3	X	8

Sheet B	1	2	3	4	5	6	7	8	9	10	Final
South Korea (Kim)	1	0	1	0	0	4	3	2	0	X	11
Denmark (Dupont)	0	3	0	1	3	0	0	0	1	X	8

Sheet C	1	2	3	4	5	6	7	8	9	10	Final
Russia (Sidorova)	0	1	0	1	0	1	0	0	2	0	5
Canada (Homan)	0	0	1	0	2	0	2	0	0	2	7

Sheet D	1	2	3	4	5	6	7	8	9	10	Final
Czech Republic (Kubešková)	0	2	0	0	0	2	0	1	0	X	5
Sweden (Sigfridsson)	1	0	1	1	0	0	4	0	3	X	10

=== Draw 2 ===
Saturday, 15 March, 19:30

Sheet A	1	2	3	4	5	6	7	8	9	10	Final
Germany (Lehmann)	0	0	1	0	1	0	0	2	0	X	4
Switzerland (Feltscher)	2	1	0	1	0	0	2	0	4	X	10

Sheet B	1	2	3	4	5	6	7	8	9	10	Final
Latvia (Regza)	0	0	1	0	0	1	X	X	X	X	2
Russia (Sidorova)	2	3	0	2	3	0	X	X	X	X	10

Sheet C	1	2	3	4	5	6	7	8	9	10	Final
Sweden (Sigfridsson)	2	5	0	5	0	1	X	X	X	X	13
South Korea (Kim)	0	0	2	0	2	0	X	X	X	X	4

Sheet D	1	2	3	4	5	6	7	8	9	10	Final
United States (Pottinger)	2	0	2	0	1	3	1	0	3	X	12
China (Liu)	0	2	0	1	0	0	0	2	0	X	5

=== Draw 3 ===
Sunday, 16 March, 9:30

Sheet B	1	2	3	4	5	6	7	8	9	10	Final
Canada (Homan)	0	2	0	2	0	0	2	0	2	X	8
Czech Republic (Kubešková)	0	0	2	0	0	1	0	1	0	X	4

Sheet C	1	2	3	4	5	6	7	8	9	10	Final
Scotland (Barr)	0	1	0	1	0	1	1	0	0	1	5
Denmark (Dupont)	1	0	1	0	1	0	0	3	1	0	7

=== Draw 4 ===
Sunday, 16 March, 14:30

Sheet A	1	2	3	4	5	6	7	8	9	10	Final
Sweden (Sigfridsson)	0	0	1	0	1	0	1	0	1	X	4
Russia (Sidorova)	0	2	0	1	0	2	0	2	0	X	7

Sheet B	1	2	3	4	5	6	7	8	9	10	Final
China (Liu)	0	0	1	0	1	0	1	0	0	0	3
Switzerland (Feltscher)	0	0	0	0	0	1	0	2	2	1	6

Sheet C	1	2	3	4	5	6	7	8	9	10	Final
Germany (Lehmann)	1	0	0	0	0	1	0	0	2	1	5
United States (Pottinger)	0	1	0	3	0	0	0	2	0	0	6

Sheet D	1	2	3	4	5	6	7	8	9	10	Final
South Korea (Kim)	1	0	1	1	0	2	0	1	0	1	7
Latvia (Regza)	0	1	0	0	1	0	1	0	1	0	4

=== Draw 5 ===
Sunday, 16 March, 19:30

Sheet A	1	2	3	4	5	6	7	8	9	10	Final
Denmark (Dupont)	0	0	1	0	1	0	X	X	X	X	2
United States (Pottinger)	2	2	0	5	0	4	X	X	X	X	13

Sheet B	1	2	3	4	5	6	7	8	9	10	Final
Germany (Lehmann)	0	0	2	0	0	1	0	2	0	0	5
Scotland (Barr)	1	1	0	2	0	0	1	0	0	1	6

Sheet C	1	2	3	4	5	6	7	8	9	10	Final
China (Liu)	3	0	2	1	0	0	3	0	2	X	11
Czech Republic (Kubešková)	0	1	0	0	2	1	0	1	0	X	5

Sheet D	1	2	3	4	5	6	7	8	9	10	Final
Canada (Homan)	0	1	0	1	0	0	0	0	X	X	2
Switzerland (Feltscher)	0	0	1	0	3	1	2	1	X	X	8

=== Draw 6 ===
Monday, 17 March, 9:30

Sheet A	1	2	3	4	5	6	7	8	9	10	Final
South Korea (Kim)	0	0	0	1	0	2	1	0	2	0	6
China (Liu)	2	1	1	0	1	0	0	2	0	1	8

Sheet B	1	2	3	4	5	6	7	8	9	10	Final
United States (Pottinger)	2	0	0	1	0	1	0	1	0	0	5
Sweden (Sigfridsson)	0	2	0	0	2	0	1	0	2	1	8

Sheet C	1	2	3	4	5	6	7	8	9	10	Final
Switzerland (Feltscher)	2	2	0	0	0	1	0	3	X	X	8
Latvia (Regza)	0	0	1	0	0	0	1	0	X	X	2

Sheet D	1	2	3	4	5	6	7	8	9	10	Final
Germany (Lehmann)	0	0	0	1	0	1	0	0	1	X	3
Russia (Sidorova)	2	0	0	0	1	0	3	1	0	X	7

=== Draw 7 ===
Monday, 17 March, 14:30

Sheet A	1	2	3	4	5	6	7	8	9	10	Final
Latvia (Regza)	0	0	0	1	0	2	0	X	X	X	3
Sweden (Sigfridsson)	3	2	0	0	2	0	3	X	X	X	10

Sheet B	1	2	3	4	5	6	7	8	9	10	Final
Denmark (Dupont)	0	0	0	0	0	1	1	0	X	X	2
Canada (Homan)	2	1	1	1	2	0	0	1	X	X	8

Sheet C	1	2	3	4	5	6	7	8	9	10	11	Final
South Korea (Kim)	0	0	2	0	0	2	1	0	0	0	1	6
Russia (Sidorova)	0	1	0	1	0	0	0	0	1	2	0	5

Sheet D	1	2	3	4	5	6	7	8	9	10	Final
Scotland (Barr)	2	0	0	1	0	0	1	1	0	1	6
Czech Republic (Kubešková)	0	1	1	0	0	1	0	0	1	0	4

=== Draw 8 ===
Monday, 17 March, 19:30

Sheet A	1	2	3	4	5	6	7	8	9	10	Final
United States (Pottinger)	0	0	1	0	2	0	X	X	X	X	3
Canada (Homan)	0	2	0	4	0	3	X	X	X	X	9

Sheet B	1	2	3	4	5	6	7	8	9	10	Final
Scotland (Barr)	1	0	1	0	2	0	1	0	2	0	7
China (Liu)	0	2	0	2	0	2	0	1	0	1	8

Sheet C	1	2	3	4	5	6	7	8	9	10	Final
Czech Republic (Kubešková)	0	0	0	0	4	0	1	0	0	0	5
Germany (Lehmann)	3	0	1	1	0	0	0	1	1	1	8

Sheet D	1	2	3	4	5	6	7	8	9	10	Final
Switzerland (Feltscher)	2	0	1	0	1	1	2	0	X	X	7
Denmark (Dupont)	0	1	0	1	0	0	0	1	X	X	3

=== Draw 9 ===
Tuesday, 18 March, 9:30

Sheet A	1	2	3	4	5	6	7	8	9	10	Final
Russia (Sidorova)	0	0	2	0	3	3	0	2	X	X	10
Scotland (Barr)	0	1	0	1	0	0	2	0	X	X	4

Sheet B	1	2	3	4	5	6	7	8	9	10	Final
South Korea (Kim)	0	0	0	2	1	0	2	0	1	2	8
Czech Republic (Kubešková)	0	0	2	0	0	1	0	2	0	0	5

Sheet C	1	2	3	4	5	6	7	8	9	10	Final
Denmark (Dupont)	0	0	1	0	1	0	0	0	X	X	2
Sweden (Sigfridsson)	0	1	0	3	0	1	1	1	X	X	7

Sheet D	1	2	3	4	5	6	7	8	9	10	Final
Latvia (Regza)	0	2	0	0	1	0	0	1	0	X	4
Canada (Homan)	2	0	2	1	0	0	2	0	1	X	8

=== Draw 10 ===
Tuesday, 18 March, 14:30

Sheet A	1	2	3	4	5	6	7	8	9	10	Final
Switzerland (Feltscher)	0	1	0	0	0	0	1	0	X	X	2
South Korea (Kim)	0	0	0	2	1	1	0	5	X	X	9

Sheet B	1	2	3	4	5	6	7	8	9	10	Final
Sweden (Sigfridsson)	0	0	3	0	2	0	0	2	4	X	11
Germany (Lehmann)	1	1	0	1	0	1	0	0	0	X	4

Sheet C	1	2	3	4	5	6	7	8	9	10	Final
Latvia (Regza)	0	0	2	0	1	0	0	2	0	X	5
China (Liu)	2	1	0	3	0	0	2	0	1	X	9

Sheet D	1	2	3	4	5	6	7	8	9	10	Final
Russia (Sidorova)	0	1	0	2	0	0	2	0	1	2	8
United States (Pottinger)	0	0	1	0	2	1	0	1	0	0	5

=== Draw 11 ===
Tuesday, 18 March, 19:30

Sheet A	1	2	3	4	5	6	7	8	9	10	Final
Denmark (Dupont)	1	0	1	0	0	1	0	1	0	X	4
Czech Republic (Kubešková)	0	2	0	1	3	0	1	0	1	X	8

Sheet B	1	2	3	4	5	6	7	8	9	10	Final
Switzerland (Feltscher)	2	1	1	2	0	0	0	1	0	1	8
United States (Pottinger)	0	0	0	0	2	1	1	0	2	0	6

Sheet C	1	2	3	4	5	6	7	8	9	10	Final
Canada (Homan)	2	0	2	0	1	0	1	1	1	X	8
Scotland (Barr)	0	1	0	1	0	1	0	0	0	X	3

Sheet D	1	2	3	4	5	6	7	8	9	10	Final
China (Liu)	1	0	0	1	2	0	1	0	0	1	6
Germany (Lehmann)	0	2	0	0	0	1	0	0	1	0	4

=== Draw 12 ===
Wednesday, 19 March, 9:30

Sheet A	1	2	3	4	5	6	7	8	9	10	Final
Canada (Homan)	0	1	0	2	0	0	1	0	1	2	7
Germany (Lehmann)	1	0	2	0	1	1	0	0	0	0	5

Sheet B	1	2	3	4	5	6	7	8	9	10	Final
China (Liu)	1	1	1	2	0	1	1	0	2	X	9
Denmark (Dupont)	0	0	0	0	2	0	0	1	0	X	3

Sheet C	1	2	3	4	5	6	7	8	9	10	11	Final
United States (Pottinger)	2	0	0	1	1	0	2	0	0	0	1	7
Czech Republic (Kubešková)	0	0	1	0	0	1	0	1	2	1	0	6

Sheet D	1	2	3	4	5	6	7	8	9	10	Final
Switzerland (Feltscher)	2	1	0	0	5	0	2	0	X	X	10
Scotland (Barr)	0	0	1	1	0	2	0	1	X	X	5

=== Draw 13 ===
Wednesday, 19 March, 14:30

Sheet A	1	2	3	4	5	6	7	8	9	10	11	Final
Scotland (Barr)	2	0	2	0	0	0	1	0	1	1	0	7
Sweden (Sigfridsson)	0	3	0	1	0	1	0	2	0	0	1	8

Sheet B	1	2	3	4	5	6	7	8	9	10	Final
Czech Republic (Kubešková)	1	1	3	1	0	0	4	X	X	X	10
Latvia (Regza)	0	0	0	0	1	1	0	X	X	X	2

Sheet C	1	2	3	4	5	6	7	8	9	10	Final
Russia (Sidorova)	0	2	2	1	0	0	1	0	1	X	7
Denmark (Dupont)	0	0	0	0	2	0	0	2	0	X	4

Sheet D	1	2	3	4	5	6	7	8	9	10	Final
Canada (Homan)	0	2	0	3	0	0	2	3	X	X	10
South Korea (Kim)	1	0	1	0	1	0	0	0	X	X	3

=== Draw 14 ===
Wednesday, 19 March, 19:30

Sheet A	1	2	3	4	5	6	7	8	9	10	Final
China (Liu)	1	0	0	0	1	0	X	X	X	X	2
Russia (Sidorova)	0	2	3	3	0	2	X	X	X	X	10

Sheet B	1	2	3	4	5	6	7	8	9	10	Final
Germany (Lehmann)	1	0	0	2	0	0	0	1	0	X	4
South Korea (Kim)	0	1	1	0	1	1	1	0	4	X	9

Sheet C	1	2	3	4	5	6	7	8	9	10	Final
Sweden (Sigfridsson)	0	0	0	1	0	0	0	1	1	0	3
Switzerland (Feltscher)	0	0	1	0	0	1	1	0	0	2	5

Sheet D	1	2	3	4	5	6	7	8	9	10	Final
United States (Pottinger)	1	0	0	0	3	0	1	2	0	X	7
Latvia (Regza)	0	0	1	0	0	1	0	0	1	X	3

=== Draw 15 ===
Thursday, 20 March, 9:30

Sheet A	1	2	3	4	5	6	7	8	9	10	Final
South Korea (Kim)	0	0	1	0	4	1	0	0	0	2	8
United States (Pottinger)	2	1	0	1	0	0	1	0	1	0	6

Sheet B	1	2	3	4	5	6	7	8	9	10	Final
Russia (Sidorova)	1	0	1	0	2	0	2	0	2	X	8
Switzerland (Feltscher)	0	1	0	1	0	1	0	2	0	X	5

Sheet C	1	2	3	4	5	6	7	8	9	10	Final
Germany (Lehmann)	1	1	1	0	1	0	2	0	0	X	6
Latvia (Regza)	0	0	0	2	0	1	0	1	0	X	4

Sheet D	1	2	3	4	5	6	7	8	9	10	Final
Sweden (Sigfridsson)	2	0	0	2	0	4	0	2	X	X	10
China (Liu)	0	2	1	0	1	0	1	0	X	X	5

=== Draw 16 ===
Thursday, 20 March, 14:30

Sheet A	1	2	3	4	5	6	7	8	9	10	Final
Czech Republic (Kubešková)	0	3	0	1	0	0	1	0	0	X	5
Switzerland (Feltscher)	1	0	2	0	1	1	0	2	2	X	9

Sheet B	1	2	3	4	5	6	7	8	9	10	Final
United States (Pottinger)	0	2	1	0	2	0	1	0	2	X	8
Scotland (Barr)	1	0	0	1	0	1	0	1	0	X	4

Sheet C	1	2	3	4	5	6	7	8	9	10	Final
China (Liu)	0	0	0	1	0	0	2	0	1	X	4
Canada (Homan)	0	1	0	0	1	1	0	3	0	X	6

Sheet D	1	2	3	4	5	6	7	8	9	10	Final
Denmark (Dupont)	4	0	0	1	0	0	0	0	0	X	5
Germany (Lehmann)	0	2	1	0	2	1	1	1	2	X	10

=== Draw 17 ===
Thursday, 20 March, 19:30

Sheet A	1	2	3	4	5	6	7	8	9	10	Final
Latvia (Regza)	1	0	1	1	0	1	0	0	0	X	4
Denmark (Dupont)	0	2	0	0	1	0	2	1	4	X	10

Sheet B	1	2	3	4	5	6	7	8	9	10	Final
Canada (Homan)	0	2	0	1	0	2	0	3	0	1	9
Sweden (Sigfridsson)	0	0	1	0	2	0	1	0	2	0	6

Sheet C	1	2	3	4	5	6	7	8	9	10	Final
Scotland (Barr)	1	0	0	1	1	0	1	1	0	X	5
South Korea (Kim)	0	3	1	0	0	3	0	0	3	X	10

Sheet D	1	2	3	4	5	6	7	8	9	10	Final
Czech Republic (Kubešková)	0	3	0	1	0	0	1	0	2	1	8
Russia (Sidorova)	0	0	1	0	2	1	0	3	0	0	7

== Tiebreaker ==
Friday, 21 March, 14:30

Sheet A	1	2	3	4	5	6	7	8	9	10	Final
Sweden (Sigfridsson)	1	0	1	0	1	0	1	0	1	0	5
South Korea (Kim)	0	1	0	1	0	3	0	1	0	1	7

Player percentages
Sweden		South Korea	
Margaretha Sigfridsson	85%	Um Min-ji	80%
Maria Wennerström	83%	Lee Seul-bee	74%
Christina Bertrup	84%	Kim Ji-sun	84%
Maria Prytz	68%	Gim Un-chi	88%
Total	80%	Total	81%

== Playoffs ==
Page playoff system
1	Canada	8
2	Switzerland	3
3	Russia	5
4	South Korea	9

Semifinal
2	Switzerland	7
4	South Korea	3

Final
1	Canada	5
2	Switzerland	9

Bronze medal game
4	South Korea	6
3	Russia	7

=== 1 vs. 2 ===
Friday, 21 March, 19:30

Team	1	2	3	4	5	6	7	8	9	10	Final
Canada (Homan)	0	1	1	0	2	0	1	0	3	X	8
Switzerland (Feltscher)	0	0	0	1	0	1	0	1	0	X	3

Player percentages
Canada		Switzerland	
Lisa Weagle	76%	Christine Urech	94%
Alison Kreviazuk	90%	Franziska Kaufmann	92%
Emma Miskew	89%	Irene Schori	88%
Rachel Homan	85%	Binia Feltscher	78%
Total	85%	Total	88%

=== 3 vs. 4 ===
Saturday, 22 March, 9:00

Team	1	2	3	4	5	6	7	8	9	10	Final
Russia (Sidorova)	2	0	1	0	0	1	0	0	1	0	5
'South Korea (Kim)	0	1	0	2	2	0	1	1	0	2	9

Player percentages
Russia		South Korea	
Ekaterina Galkina	90%	Um Min-ji	89%
Aleksandra Saitova	89%	Lee Seul-bee	85%
Margarita Fomina	70%	Kim Ji-sun	91%
Anna Sidorova	69%	Gim Un-chi	82%
Total	79%	Total	87%

=== Semifinal ===
Saturday, 22 March, 14:00

Team	1	2	3	4	5	6	7	8	9	10	Final
Switzerland (Feltscher)	1	0	1	0	2	0	0	0	3	X	7
South Korea (Kim)	0	1	0	1	0	1	0	0	0	X	3

Player percentages
Switzerland		South Korea	
Christine Urech	90%	Um Min-ji	80%
Franziska Kaufmann	93%	Lee Seul-bee	74%
Irene Schori	76%	Kim Ji-sun	71%
Binia Feltscher	81%	Gim Un-chi	75%
Total	85%	Total	75%

=== Bronze medal game ===
Sunday, 23 March, 12:00

Team	1	2	3	4	5	6	7	8	9	10	11	Final
South Korea (Kim)	0	0	0	1	0	0	2	0	3	0	0	6
Russia (Sidorova)	1	0	1	0	0	1	0	1	0	2	1	7

Player percentages
South Korea		Russia	
Um Min-ji	88%	Ekaterina Galkina	91%
Lee Seul-bee	85%	Aleksandra Saitova	93%
Kim Ji-sun	76%	Margarita Fomina	91%
Gim Un-chi	69%	Anna Sidorova	77%
Total	80%	Total	88%

=== Final ===
Sunday, 23 March, 19:30

Sheet B	1	2	3	4	5	6	7	8	9	10	Final
Canada (Homan)	0	0	2	0	2	0	1	0	0	X	5
Switzerland (Feltscher)	0	0	0	2	0	1	0	3	3	X	9

Player percentages
Canada		Switzerland	
Lisa Weagle	80%	Christine Urech	90%
Alison Kreviazuk	81%	Franziska Kaufmann	90%
Emma Miskew	61%	Irene Schori	84%
Rachel Homan	63%	Binia Feltscher	79%
Total	71%	Total	86%

2014 Ford World Women's Curling Championship winner
(Switzerland)
Switzerland
4th title

== Statistics ==
=== Top 5 player percentages ===
Round robin only

Leads	%
(Sweden) Margaretha Sigfridsson (Skip)	85
(Russia) Ekaterina Galkina	84
(South Korea) Um Min-ji	83
(United States) Tabitha Peterson	82
(Canada) Lisa Weagle	82

Seconds	%
(Canada) Alison Kreviazuk	84
(United States) Natalie Nicholson	83
(Russia) Alexandra Saitova	82
(Sweden) Maria Wennerström	81
(China) Jinli Liu	80

Thirds	%
(Canada) Emma Miskew	86
(Russia) Margarita Fomina	84
(Sweden) Christina Bertrup	82
(Switzerland) Irene Schori	80
(United States) Nicole Joraanstad	79

Skips	%
(Canada) Rachel Homan	85
(Switzerland) Binia Feltscher	82
(Russia) Anna Sidorova	81
(Sweden) Maria Prytz (Fourth)	77
(United States) Allison Pottinger	75
