= Barbara McPake =

Scottish curler and coach

Barbara Morton
- Curler ♀
- Born: Barbara McFarlane; 17 June 1986 (age 40)

Team
- Curling club: Keir CC

Curling career
- Member Association: Scotland
- World Championship: 1 (2014)
- Other appearances: World Junior Championships: 1 (2007), World Mixed Championship: 1 (2017)
Medal record
Curling
World Mixed Curling Championship
Gold medal – first place	2017 Champéry
Scottish Women's Championship
Gold medal – first place	2014 Perth
World Junior Curling Championships
Gold medal – first place	2007 Eveleth

Barbara Morton (born 17 June 1986 as Barbara McFarlane) is a Scottish curler and curling coach.

At the international level she is a 2017 World mixed champion and a 2007 World junior champion.

At the national level, she is a 2014 Scottish women's champion, a 2017 mixed champion and a 2007 junior champion.

== Teams ==
=== Women's ===
Season	Skip	Third	Second	Lead	Alternate	Coach	Events
2005–06	Sarah Reid	Eve Muirhead	Barbara McFarlane	Sarah MacIntyre			
2006–07	Sarah Reid	Eve Muirhead	Barbara McFarlane	Sarah MacIntyre	Alison Black	Sheila Swan	SJCC 2007 (gold); WJCC 2007 (gold)
2009–10	Sarah Reid	Kerry Barr	Barbara McFarlane	Lindsay Wood			
2010–11	Sarah Reid	Kerry Barr	Kay Adams	Barbara McFarlane			SWCC 2011 (5th)
2011–12	Sarah Reid	Rachael Simms	Lorna Vevers	Barbara McFarlane			SWCC 2012 (5th)
2012–13	Kerry Barr	Rachael Simms	Rhiann Macleod	Barbara McPake			SWCC 2013 (bronze)
2013–14	Kerry Barr	Rachael Simms	Rhiann Macleod	Barbara McPake	Hannah Fleming (WCC)	Keith MacLennan	SWCC 2014 (gold); WCC 2014 (11th)

=== Mixed ===
Season	Skip	Third	Second	Lead	Events
2013–14	Duncan Gracie	Kerry Barr	Scott Robertson	Barbara McPake	SMxCC 2014 (11th)
2016–17	Grant Hardie	Rhiann MacLeod	Billy Morton	Barbara McFarlane	SMxCC 2017 (gold)
2017–18	Grant Hardie (fourth)	Rhiann MacLeod	Billy Morton (skip)	Barbara McFarlane	WMxCC 2017 (gold); SMxCC 2018 (silver)

== Record as a coach of national teams ==
Year	Tournament, event	National team	Place
2015	2015 World Mixed Curling Championship	Scotland (mixed)	9
