= Kerry Barr =

Scottish curler

- Curler
- Born: 20 August 1986 (age 40)

Team
- Curling club: Currie & Balerno CC; Edinburgh, SCO
- Skip: Kerry Barr
- Third: Rachael Simms
- Second: Rhiann Macleod
- Lead: Barbara McPake
- Alternate: Hannah Fleming

Curling career
- World Championship: 2 (2006, 2014)
- European Championship: 0
Medal record
World Junior Curling Championships
Gold medal – first place	2008 Östersund
European Mixed Curling Championship
Gold medal – first place	2010 Howwood

Kerry Barr (born 20 August 1986) is a Scottish curler from Murrayfield. She is a former World Junior champion.

== Career ==
As a junior curler, Barr played in her first World Junior Curling Championships in 2005, playing third for the Victoria Sloan rink. The team finished 7th in the tournament for Scotland. The following year, Barr was invited to be the alternate player for Scotland at the 2006 Ford World Women's Curling Championship, but she would not play in any games. In her final year of juniors, Barr played third on the Eve Muirhead rink at the 2008 World Junior Curling Championships. The team won the gold medal, defeating Sweden's Cecilia Östlund in the final.

After juniors, Barr joined the Sarah Reid at third. Barr played in the 2010 European Mixed Curling Championship, Barr played third for the Scottish team (skipped by David Edwards) that won the gold medal, defeating Switzerland in the final. The team attempted to repeat their performance at the 2011 European Mixed Curling Championship, but finished 7th.

Barr left the Reid rink in 2011 to form her own team. Barr's rink of Rachael Simms, Rhiann Macleod and Barbara McPake were surprise winners of the 2014 Scottish Women's Curling Championship. The event was notably missing the defending World Champion Eve Muirhead rink, who had competed at the 2014 Winter Olympics. Nonetheless, the Barr rink were not the favourites, and finished in 2nd place after the round robin with a 7–5 record, behind Hannah Fleming. The rink would lose their first playoff match against Fleming, but would win in the semi-final against Jennifer Martin, and would beat Fleming in the final to advance to the 2014 Ford World Women's Curling Championship where she will represent Scotland.
