= Rachael Simms =

Scottish female curler

- Curler ♀
- Born: 7 September 1983 (age 43)

Team
- Curling club: Lockerbie CC, Perth CC, Airleywight Ladies CC, Perth

Curling career
- Member Association: Scotland
- World Championship: 2 (2009, 2014)
- Other appearances: World Junior Championships: 2 (2003, 2004)
Medal record
Curling
Scottish Women's Championship
| Gold medal – first place | 2009 |
| Gold medal – first place | 2014 |
Scottish Mixed Doubles Championship
| Gold medal – first place | 2009 Edinburgh |

Rachael Simms (born 7 September 1983) is a Scottish curler.

At the national level, she is a two-time Scottish women's champion (2009, 2014) and a 2009 mixed doubles champion.

== Teams ==
=== Women's ===
| Season | Skip | Third | Second | Lead | Alternate | Coach | Events |
|---|---|---|---|---|---|---|---|
| 2002–03 | Rachael Simms | Victoria Sloan | Lynsey Davidson | Laura Kirkpatrick | Frances McKerrow (WJCC) | Claire Milne | SJCC 2003 (gold); WJCC 2003 (7th) |
| 2004 | Sarah Reid | Judith McFarlane | Frances McKerrow | Nicola Munro | Rachael Simms | Sheila Swan | WJCC 2004 (7th) |
| 2008–09 | Eve Muirhead | Karen Addison | Rachael Simms | Anne Laird | Jackie Lockhart (WCC) | Isobel Hannen | SWCC 2009 (gold); WCC 2009 (8th) |
| 2009–10 | Claire Milne | Lynn Cameron | Rachael Simms | Kim Brewster | | | |
| 2010–11 | Claire Milne | Lynn Cameron | Rachael Simms | Katie Loudon | | | |
| 2011–12 | Sarah Reid | Rachael Simms | Lorna Vevers | Barbara McFarlane | | | SWCC 2012 (5th) |
| 2012–13 | Kerry Barr | Rachael Simms | Rhiann Macleod | Barbara McPake | | | SWCC 2013 (bronze) |
| 2013–14 | Kerry Barr | Rachael Simms | Rhiann Macleod | Barbara McPake | Hannah Fleming (WCC) | Keith MacLennan | SWCC 2014 (gold); WCC 2014 (11th) |
| 2016–17 | Claire Milne | Mairi Milne | Lynn Cameron-Thompson | Rachael Simms | | | |

=== Mixed ===
| Season | Skip | Third | Second | Lead | Events |
|---|---|---|---|---|---|
| 2014–15 | Gordon Craik | Lesley Young | Murray Young | Rachael Simms | SMxCC 2015 (5th) |

=== Mixed doubles ===
| Season | Male | Female | Events |
|---|---|---|---|
| 2009–10 | Logan Gray | Rachael Simms | SMDCC 2009 (gold) |
