= Maria Wennerström =

Swedish curler

- Curler
- Born: 10 April 1985 (age 41); Skellefteå, Sweden

Team
- Curling club: Skellefteå CK, Skellefteå, SWE
- Skip: Margaretha Sigfridsson
- Fourth: Cissi Östlund
- Third: Christina Bertrup
- Second: Maria Wennerström
- Alternate: Agnes Knochenhauer

Curling career
- World Championship: 5 (2008, 2012, 2013, 2014, 2016)
- European Championship: 4 (2010, 2011, 2012, 2013)
- Olympic: 1 (2014)
Medal record
Curling
Representing Sweden
Olympic Games
Silver medal – second place	2014 Sochi	Team
World Curling Championships
Silver medal – second place	2012 Lethbridge
Silver medal – second place	2013 Riga
European Curling Championships
Gold medal – first place	2010 Champéry
Gold medal – first place	2013 Stavanger
Silver medal – second place	2011 Moscow
Bronze medal – third place	2012 Karlstad
World Junior Curling Championships
Silver medal – second place	2005 Pinerolo
Bronze medal – third place	2004 Trois-Rivières

Maria Wennerström (born 10 April 1985) is a Swedish curler. She won a silver medal at the 2014 Winter Olympics as the second of the team skipped by Margaretha Sigfridsson.

== Curling career ==
=== Juniors ===
Wennerström's junior career sent her to four straight World Junior Curling Championships, from 2003 to 2006. At the 2003 World Junior Curling Championships, she was the alternate for the Swedish team skipped by Stina Viktorsson. Wennerström didn't play in any matches, and the team finished 4th. At the 2004 World Junior Curling Championships, Wennerström played lead for Viktorsson's team, and they improved on their 2003 record, by winning the bronze medal. At the 2005 World Junior Curling Championships, Wennerström was promoted, this time to play second for Viktorsson, and they had even more success, winning the silver medal, after losing in the final match against Switzerland's Tania Grivel. The team would return to the World Juniors the following year, however at the 2006 World Junior Curling Championships, they could not improve on their record, finishing 8th overall.

=== Women's ===
After juniors, Wennerström would continue to play with Viktorsson when they participated in the 2007 Winter Universiade, playing third on the team. The rink finished in 4th place. The following year, Wennerström was moved back to second on Viktorsson's rink when they played at the 2008 Ford World Women's Curling Championship. The team finished in 6th place at the event. The following year, they played in the 2009 Winter Universiade with Wennerström throwing third rocks again. They would finish 6th. The team would find their most success the following year, when they won the gold medal at the 2010 European Curling Championships, defeating Scotland's Eve Muirhead in the final. Wennerström played second on that team.

Wennerström left the Viktorsson rink in 2011 to play with Sigfridsson as her second. The team would find immediate success, winning the silver medal at the 2011 European Curling Championships, after losing the final to Scotland's Muirhead. The team continued their success that season by winning a silver medal at the 2012 Ford World Women's Curling Championship, losing to Switzerland's Mirjam Ott in the final. They had another successful Euro Championship, when they won the bronze medal at the 2012 European Curling Championships and a silver medal at the 2013 World Women's Curling Championship.

For the 2013-14 curling season, the team won the gold medal at the 2013 European Curling Championships, a silver medal at the 2014 Winter Olympics and a 5th place finish at the 2014 World Women's Curling Championship. After their last world championship, the team finished 9th at the 2016 World Women's Curling Championship.

On the World Curling Tour, Wennerström has won two WCT bonspiels with the Sigfridsson rink, the 2011 Credit Suisse Women's Masters Basel and the 2012 Women's Masters Basel. Wennerström has played in four Grand Slam events, but has failed to qualify for the playoffs in any of them. She played in the 2010 Manitoba Lotteries Women's Curling Classic and the 2011 Players' Championship with Viktorsson, and the 2011 and 2012 Manitoba Lotteries Women's Curling Classics with Sigfridsson.

In 2011 she was inducted into the Swedish Curling Hall of Fame.

== Personal life ==
Wennerström is engaged and has two children (born 2015 and 2018). She lives in Skellefteå, Västerbotten, Sweden.
