= Christina Bertrup =

Swedish curler and Olympic medalist

- Curler
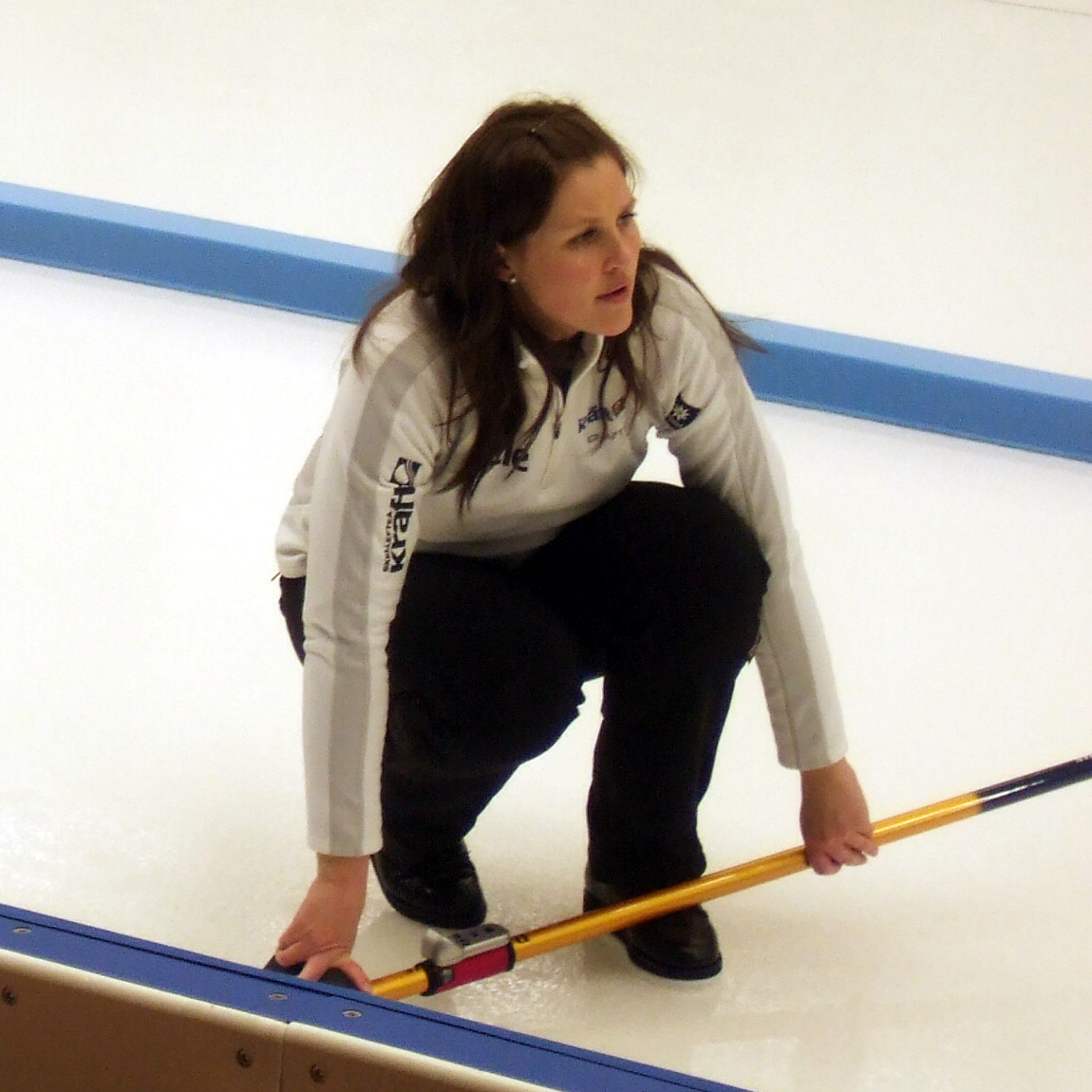
- Bertrup competing in January 2009
- Born: 23 December 1976 (age 49); Skoen, Sweden

Team
- Curling club: Skellefteå CK, Skellefteå, SWE
- Skip: Margaretha Sigfridsson
- Fourth: Cissi Östlund
- Third: Christina Bertrup
- Second: Maria Wennerström

Curling career
- World Championship: 6 (2000, 2012, 2013, 2014, 2015, 2016)
- European Championship: 5 (2000, 2010, 2011, 2012, 2013)
- Olympic: 2 (2002, 2014)
Medal record
Curling
Representing Sweden
Olympic Games
Silver medal – second place	2014 Sochi	Team
World Curling Championships
Silver medal – second place	2012 Lethbridge
Silver medal – second place	2013 Riga
European Curling Championships
Gold medal – first place	2000 Oberstdorf
Gold medal – first place	2010 Champéry
Gold medal – first place	2013 Stavanger
Silver medal – second place	2011 Moscow
Bronze medal – third place	2012 Karlstad

Christina Bertrup (born 23 December 1976) is a Swedish curler. She won a silver medal at the 2014 Winter Olympics as the third of the team skipped by Margaretha Sigfridsson.

== Curling career ==
Bertrup began her international curling career as the alternate player for Elisabet Gustafson. With Gustafson, she won a gold medal at the 2000 European Curling Championships, and placed 6th at the 2002 Winter Olympics.

Gustafson retired after the Olympics, and Bertrup was without a team. She wouldn't return to the international curling scene until being picked up by Stina Viktorsson in 2010. Bertrup played third for the team, and they won a gold medal at the 2010 European Curling Championships.

Viktorsson left the team in 2011, and was replaced at the fourth position by Maria Prytz. The team's lead, Sigfridsson assumed skipping duties. They won a silver medal at the 2011 European Curling Championships, and the rink was chosen to represent Sweden at the 2012 Ford World Women's Curling Championship, where they would go on to win a silver medal. The next season, the team would win a bronze medal at the 2012 European Curling Championships and a silver medal at the 2013 World Women's Curling Championship.

For the 2013-14 curling season, the team won the gold medal at the 2013 European Curling Championships, a silver medal at the 2014 Winter Olympics and a 5th place finish at the 2014 World Women's Curling Championship. Since their Olympic season, the team would finish 7th at the 2015 World Women's Curling Championship and 9th at the 2016 World Women's Curling Championship.

In 2009 she was inducted into the Swedish Curling Hall of Fame.

== Personal life ==
Bertrup has a partner and two children.
