= Sandra Gantenbein =

Swiss curler

- Curler ♀
- Born: 1984 (age 41–42); Bern, Switzerland

Team
- Curling club: CC Bern, Bern, CC Aarau, Aarau

Curling career
- Member Association: Switzerland
- World Championship: 1 (2013)
- Other appearances: World Junior Championships: 1 (2004)
Medal record
Curling
Swiss Women's Championship
Gold medal – first place	2013 Gstaad
Silver medal – second place	2010 Bern
Silver medal – second place	2011 Gstaad

Sandra Gantenbein (born c. 1984 in Bern) is a Swiss curler.

At the national level, she is a 2013 Swiss women's champion curler.

== Teams ==
Season	Skip	Third	Second	Lead	Alternate	Coach	Events
2003–04	Christine Urech (fourth)	Stéphanie Jäggi (skip)	Sandra Gantenbein	Christine Dreier	Tania Grivel	Sibille Buhlmann	WJCC 2004 (5th)
2006–07	Irene Schori	Christine Urech	Sandra Gantenbein	Sabrina Geiler	Karin Baumann		
2008–09	Silvana Tirinzoni	Carmen Küng	Irene Schori	Christine Urech	Sandra Gantenbein		
2009–10	Silvana Tirinzoni	Irene Schori	Christine Urech	Sandra Gantenbein			
2009–10	Silvana Tirinzoni	Irene Schori	Esther Neuenschwander	Sandra Gantenbein	Anna Neuenschwander, Christine Urech	Laurie Burrows	SWCC 2010 (silver)
2010–11	Silvana Tirinzoni	Irene Schori	Esther Neuenschwander	Sandra Gantenbein	Anna Neuenschwander	Laurie Burrows	SWCC 2011 (silver)
2011–12	Silvana Tirinzoni	Irene Schori	Esther Neuenschwander	Sandra Gantenbein	Anna Neuenschwander, Manuela Kormann-Netzer	Ralph Schönfeld	SWCC 2012 (4th)
2012–13	Silvana Tirinzoni	Marlene Albrecht	Esther Neuenschwander	Sandra Gantenbein	Anna Neuenschwander (SWCC), Andrea Marx (SWCC), Manuela Siegrist (WCC)	Brian Chick	SWCC 2013 (gold); WCC 2013 (5th)
