= Maria Prytz =

Swedish curler

- Curler
- Born: Maria Engholm; 18 October 1976 (age 50); Sveg, Sweden

Team
- Curling club: Skellefteå CK, Skellefteå, SWE
- Skip: Margaretha Sigfridsson
- Fourth: Maria Prytz
- Third: Christina Bertrup
- Second: Maria Wennerström
- Alternate: Agnes Knochenhauer

Curling career
- World Championship: 9 (2001, 2002, 2003, 2008, 2012, 2013, 2014, 2015, 2016)
- European Championship: 7 (1999, 2003, 2007, 2011, 2012, 2013, 2016)
- Olympic: 1 (2014)
Medal record
Women's Curling
Representing Sweden
Olympic Games
Silver medal – second place	2014 Sochi	Team
World Championships
Silver medal – second place	2001 Lausanne
Silver medal – second place	2002 Bismarck
Silver medal – second place	2012 Lethbridge
Silver medal – second place	2013 Riga
Bronze medal – third place	2003 Winnipeg
European Championships
Gold medal – first place	2003 Courmayeur
Gold medal – first place	2007 Füssen
Gold medal – first place	2013 Stavanger
Silver medal – second place	1999 Chamonix
Silver medal – second place	2011 Moscow
Silver medal – second place	2016 Braehead
Bronze medal – third place	2012 Karlstad
World Junior Championships
Silver medal – second place	1995 Perth
Silver medal – second place	1997 Karuizawa
Bronze medal – third place	1994 Sofia
Bronze medal – third place	1998 Thunder Bay

Maria Prytz (born 18 October 1976; née Engholm) is a Swedish curler from Härnösand. She won a silver medal at the 2014 Winter Olympics as the fourth of the team skipped by Margaretha Sigfridsson. Prytz was the longtime alternate player for the Anette Norberg rink.

== Career ==
Prytz's first two trips to the World Junior Curling Championships were as the alternate for the Margaretha Lindahl team in 1994 and 1995. They won the bronze medal and the silver medal respectively. She went to the World Juniors once again in 1997, this time throwing fourth stones for Margaretha Sigfridsson. The team won the silver medal. Prytz returned to the World Juniors in 1998, this time playing third for Matila Mattsson. They would win a bronze medal.

After juniors, Prytz went back to being the alternate for Lindahl, and won a silver medal at the 1999 European Curling Championships. She then joined the Norberg rink as her alternate. With Norberg, she would win gold medals at the 2003 and 2007 European Curling Championships, a silver medal at the 2001 World Curling Championships, and a bronze medal at the 2003 World Championship. Prytz also played for Sigfridsson once again during this period, and won a silver medal at the 2002 World Championships, throwing fourth stones for the team.

After her stint as Norberg's alternate, Prytz joined the Stina Viktorsson rink, playing third for her. However, they were not successful, and she once again teamed up with Sigfridsson, and once again threw last stones for the team. This team would be more successful, and they won a silver medal at the 2011 European Curling Championships.

In 2009 she was inducted into the Swedish Curling Hall of Fame.

== Personal life ==
Prytz works as a public relations manager. She has two children.
