= Alice Spence =

Scottish curler

Medal record

Curling

Representing Scotland

World Junior Curling Championships
Gold medal – first place	2011 Perth	
Gold medal – first place	2012 Östersund	

Scottish Mixed Doubles Championship
Bronze medal – third place	2018 Glasgow	

European Youth Olympic Winter Festival
Gold medal – first place	2009 Bielsko-Biała	

Alice Spence (born 30 June 1991 in Dumfries) is a Scottish curler from Lockerbie. She is a two-time world junior champion (2011, 2012).

== Career ==
=== Youth ===
Spence began her junior career by winning a gold medal at the 2009 European Youth Olympic Winter Festival, playing lead for the Scottish team skipped by Anna Sloan.

Spence was the alternate on the Scottish team, skipped by Eve Muirhead, that won gold at the 2011 World Junior Curling Championships, although she did not play in any games. She then played second for Scotland at the 2012 World Junior Curling Championships on a team skipped by Hannah Fleming, which also won the gold medal.

While attending Queen Margaret University, Spence played lead for Great Britain, again skipped by Fleming, at the 2013 Winter Universiade, where the team finished fourth.

=== Women's and mixed ===
After playing one season for Lorna Vevers, Spence returned to the Fleming rink in 2013, playing second on the team from 2014.

Spence played lead for Scotland at the 2014 European Mixed Curling Championship on a team skipped by Kyle Smith, finishing fourth.

The Fleming rink won the 2018 Scottish Women's Curling Championship and defeated the Eve Muirhead Olympic team for the right to represent Scotland at the 2018 Ford World Women's Curling Championship.

== Personal life ==
Spence works as a lab technician.
