= Franziska Kaufmann =

Swiss curler

- Curler
- Born: 3 November 1987 (age 39); Unterseen, Switzerland

Team
- Curling club: CC Flims, Flims, SUI

Curling career
- Member Association: Switzerland
- World Championship: 3 (2014, 2016, 2018)
- European Championship: 3 (2011, 2014, 2016)
Medal record
Women's curling
Representing Switzerland
World Championships
Gold medal – first place	2014 Saint John
Gold medal – first place	2016 Swift Current
European Championships
Gold medal – first place	2014 Champéry
World Junior Championships
Bronze medal – third place	2009 Vancouver

Franziska Kaufmann (born 3 November 1987 in Unterseen) is a Swiss curler from Grindelwald. She won a gold medal at the 2014 and 2016 World Women's Curling Championships as second for Binia Feltscher

== Career ==
As a junior curler, Kaufmann played in two World Junior Curling Championships. At the 2007 World Junior Curling Championships she played second for the Swiss team, skipped by Sandra Zurbuchen. The team wrapped up the round robin tournament with a 5–4 record, in a three-way tie for fourth place. The team had to play in two tie-break matches to make the playoffs. They won their first match by beating Norway's Kristin Moen Skaslien, but they lost in the second tie-breaker to Scotland's Sarah Reid. Kaufmann returned as second for the Swiss junior team at the 2009 World Junior Curling Championships, which was skipped by Martina Baumann this time. The team finished the round robin with a 7–2 record, tied with Scotland for first place. The team lost to Scotland's Eve Muirhead in their first playoff match, and then lost in the semi-final to Canada's Kaitlyn Lawes. The team then won the bronze medal game, against Russia's Margarita Fomina.

Kaufmann would join the Binia Feltscher rink in 2011. The team went to the 2011 European Curling Championships and finished in seventh place.

Kaufmann won her first World Curling Tour event in 2013 at the Glynhill Ladies International. She also won the Karuizawa International that season as well.

The 2013–14 season was a breakthrough year for Kaufmann and teammates Binia Feltscher, Irene Schori and Christine Urech. At the start of the season, they won the 2013 Red Deer Curling Classic and made the playoffs of the Stockholm Ladies Cup and the Women's Masters Basel. They also won the right to represent Switzerland at the 2014 World Women's Curling Championship in Saint John, New Brunswick, Kaufmann's first World Championship. They had a great round robin, finishing in second with a 9–2 record, only losing to South Korea and Russia. This sent her to the 1 vs 2 game against Canada's Rachel Homan which she would lose 8–3. They quickly rebounded in the semifinal against Korea's Kim Ji-sun setting up a rematch against Homan. After a slow first half, the Swiss team would score three points in the eighth end and steal three in the ninth, giving them a 9–5 lead going into the final end. They successfully ran the Canadians out of stones to secure Switzerland's fourth World Championship title.

The following season, Team Feltscher won the 2014 European Curling Championships by defeating Anna Sidorova in the final. They also played in three Grand Slam of Curling events, the first time playing in one for Kaufmann. They qualified at both the 2014 Masters and the 2014 Canadian Open. They did not get to defend their title as World Champions, finishing 4–6 at the 2015 Swiss Women's Curling Championship. The 2015–16 season started slow for the Swiss rink, only qualifying in three events at the start including winning the 2015 International ZO Women's Tournament. Things changed however when they won the Swiss championship and were back at the World Championships. They finished the round robin of the 2016 World Women's Curling Championship once again with a 9–2 but this time in first place, giving them hammer and choice of stones in the 1 vs 2 game. They defeated Japan's Satsuki Fujisawa to advance to the final where they would once again play the Japanese rink. Up 7–6 in the last end, they forced Fujisawa to draw for one to tie the game but she was to heavy, giving Kaufmann and her team their second World Women's Curling Championship gold medal and title. The team ended their season by winning the 2016 Euronics European Masters.

Team Feltscher won the right to represent Switzerland at the 2016 European Curling Championships but they did not qualify. They made the semifinal of the 2016 WFG Masters and finished second at the Swiss championship. The next season, they were able to win the Swiss playdowns, sending Kaufmann to yet another World Women's Curling Championship. They couldn't win three in a row as the team struggled throughout the week, posting a 5–7 record. At the conclusion of the 2017–18 season, Kaufmann stepped away from competitive curling.

== Personal life ==
Kaufmann works as a ticketing agent at a train station in Grindelwald. She is in a relationship.

== Teams ==
Season	Skip	Third	Second	Lead	Alternate
2006–07	Sandra Zurbuchen	Martina Baumann	Franziska Kaufmann	Fabienne Kaufmann	Marlene Albrecht
2009–10	Martina Baumann	Marisa Winkelhausen	Franziska Kaufmann	Isabel Kurt	Annina Reimann
2011–12	Binia Feltscher-Beeli	Marlene Albrecht	Franziska Kaufmann	Christine Urech	Manuela Siegrist
2012–13	Binia Feltscher-Beeli	Irene Schori	Franziska Kaufmann	Christine Urech	
2013–14	Binia Feltscher	Irene Schori	Franziska Kaufmann	Christine Urech	Carole Howald
2014–15	Binia Feltscher	Irene Schori	Franziska Kaufmann	Christine Urech	Carole Howald
2015–16	Binia Feltscher	Irene Schori	Franziska Kaufmann	Christine Urech	Carole Howald
2016–17	Binia Feltscher	Irene Schori	Franziska Kaufmann	Christine Urech	Carole Howald
2017–18	Binia Feltscher	Irene Schori	Franziska Kaufmann	Carole Howald	Raphaela Keiser
