= Christine Urech =

Swiss curler

- Curler
- Born: January 15, 1984 (age 42); Biel/Bienne, Bern, Switzerland

Team
- Curling club: Flims CC, Flims

Curling career
- Member Association: Switzerland
- World Championship: 2 (2014, 2016)
- European Championship: 3 (2011, 2014, 2016)
Medal record
Women's curling
Representing Switzerland
World Championships
Gold medal – first place	2014 Saint John
Gold medal – first place	2016 Swift Current
European Championships
Gold medal – first place	2014 Champéry

Christine Urech (born January 15, 1984, in Biel/Bienne) is a Swiss curler from Lucerne. She won a gold medal at the 2014 and 2016 World Women's Curling Championships as lead for Binia Feltscher.

== Career ==
In her junior career, Urech played as fourth for Stéphanie Jäggi. They played in the 2004 World Junior Curling Championships, finishing in fifth place. She then played as third for Irene Schori until the 2007–08 season. She then moved to Silvana Tirinzoni's rink to play second until the 2009–10, when she joined Binia Feltscher's rink. After one year, the team added Franziska Kaufmann, and Urech moved down to the lead position. Schori joined Feltscher's rink as third for the next season. The team went to the 2011 European Curling Championships and finished in seventh place.

Urech won her first World Curling Tour event in 2013 at the Glynhill Ladies International. She also won the Karuizawa International that season as well.

The 2013–14 season was a breakthrough year for Urech and teammates Binia Feltscher, Irene Schori and Franziska Kaufmann. At the start of the season, they won the 2013 Red Deer Curling Classic and made the playoffs of the Stockholm Ladies Cup and the Women's Masters Basel. They also won the right to represent Switzerland at the 2014 World Women's Curling Championship in Saint John, New Brunswick, Urech's first World Championship. They had a great round robin, finishing in second with a 9–2 record, only losing to South Korea and Russia. This sent them to the 1 vs 2 game against Canada's Rachel Homan which they would lose 8–3. Switzerland quickly rebounded in the semifinal against Korea's Kim Ji-sun setting up a rematch against Homan. After a slow first half, the Swiss team would score three points in the eighth end and steal three in the ninth, giving them a 9–5 lead going into the final end. They successfully ran the Canadians out of stones to secure Switzerland's fourth World Championship title.

The following season, Team Feltscher won the 2014 European Curling Championships by defeating Anna Sidorova in the final. They also played in three Grand Slam of Curling events, the first time playing in one for Urech. They qualified at both the 2014 Masters and the 2014 Canadian Open. They did not get to defend their title as World Champions, finishing 4–6 at the 2015 Swiss Women's Curling Championship. The 2015–16 season started slow for the Swiss rink, only qualifying in three events at the start including winning the 2015 International ZO Women's Tournament. Things changed however when they won the Swiss championship and were back at the World Championships. They finished the round robin of the 2016 World Women's Curling Championship once again with a 9–2 but this time in first place, giving them hammer and choice of stones in the 1 vs 2 game. They defeated Japan's Satsuki Fujisawa to advance to the final where they would once again play the Japanese rink. Up 7–6 in the last end, they forced Fujisawa to draw for one to tie the game but she was to heavy, giving Urech and her team their second World Women's Curling Championship gold medal and title. The team ended their season by winning the 2016 Euronics European Masters.

Team Feltscher won the right to represent Switzerland at the 2016 European Curling Championships but they did not qualify. They made the semifinal of the 2016 WFG Masters and finished second at the Swiss championship. After the season, Urech left the team and stopped competitive curling.

Although she stopped playing full time, Urech has occasionally spared for the Elena Stern rink from Brig-Glis. She was Team Stern's alternate at the 2020 Swiss Women's Curling Championship. They surprised many when they upset the defending world champion rink Silvana Tirinzoni three times and defeated them in the final 6–4. The team was set to represent Switzerland at the 2020 World Women's Curling Championship before the event got cancelled due to the COVID-19 pandemic.

== Personal life ==
Urech is currently employed as an industrial designer. She is in a relationship with Mario Rohner.

== Teams ==
Season	Skip	Third	Second	Lead	Alternate
2003–04	Christine Urech (Fourth)	Stéphanie Jäggi (Skip)	Sandra Gantenbein	Christine Dreier	Tania Grivel
2009–10	Silvana Tirinzoni	Irene Schori	Christine Urech	Sandra Gantenbein	
2010–11	Binia Feltscher-Beeli	Marlene Albrecht	Christine Urech	Sandra Ramstein-Attinger	
2011–12	Binia Feltscher-Beeli	Marlene Albrecht	Franziska Kaufmann	Christine Urech	Manuela Siegrist
2012–13	Binia Feltscher-Beeli	Irene Schori	Franziska Kaufmann	Christine Urech	
2013–14	Binia Feltscher	Irene Schori	Franziska Kaufmann	Christine Urech	Carole Howald
2014–15	Binia Feltscher	Irene Schori	Franziska Kaufmann	Christine Urech	Carole Howald
2015–16	Binia Feltscher	Irene Schori	Franziska Kaufmann	Christine Urech	Carole Howald
2016–17	Binia Feltscher	Irene Schori	Franziska Kaufmann	Christine Urech	Carole Howald
