= Margaretha Sigfridsson =

Swedish curler (born 1976)

- Curler
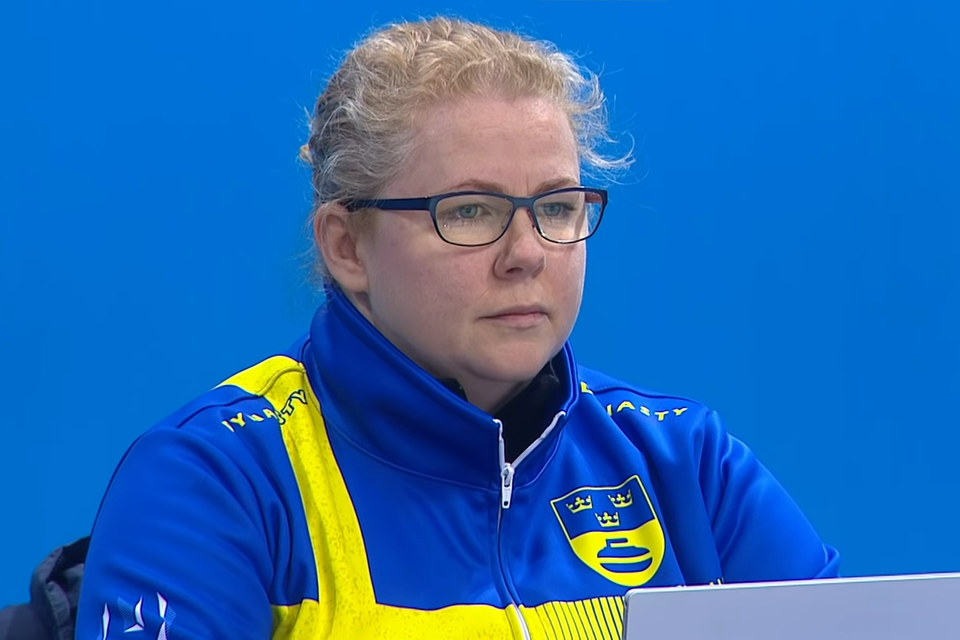
- Sigfridsson in 2013
- Born: 28 January 1976 (age 50); Sveg, Härjedalen, Sweden

Team
- Curling club: Skellefteå CK, Skellefteå, SWE

Curling career
- World Championship: 8 (2002, 2008, 2009, 2012, 2013, 2014, 2015, 2016)
- European Championship: 4 (2010, 2011, 2012, 2013)
- Olympic: 1 (2014)
Medal record
Curling
Representing Sweden
Olympic Games
| Silver medal – second place | 2014 Sochi | Team |
World Curling Championships
| Silver medal – second place | 2002 Bismarck |
| Silver medal – second place | 2009 Gangneung |
| Silver medal – second place | 2012 Lethbridge |
| Silver medal – second place | 2013 Riga |
European Curling Championships
| Gold medal – first place | 2010 Champéry |
| Gold medal – first place | 2013 Stavanger |
| Silver medal – second place | 2011 Moscow |
| Bronze medal – third place | 2012 Karlstad |
World Junior Curling Championships
| Silver medal – second place | 1997 Karuizawa |

Margaretha Sigfridsson (born 28 January 1976) is a Swedish curler who in 2009 was inducted into the Swedish Curling Hall of Fame. She skipped her team to win a silver medal at the 2014 Winter Olympics.

== Curling career ==
=== Early career ===
Sigfridsson skipped the Swedish team at the 1997 World Junior Curling Championships, winning the silver medal. Sweden lost in the final game 11–3 to Scotland, skipped by Julia Ewart.

Sigfridsson was the Swedish skip at the 2002 Ford World Women's Curling Championship. Once again, she won a silver medal, and once again lost to Scotland (this time, skipped by Jackie Lockhart) in the final. The score was 6–5.

=== 2006–2011 ===
Sigfridsson would later join the Stina Viktorsson rink, at first playing second, and then becoming lead in 2007. Sigfridsson would return to the Worlds as a member of the Viktorsson rink at the World Championships in 2008, finishing in sixth place. The team would win their first World Curling Tour event the next season, winning the 2008 Stockholm Ladies Cup. Later in the season, Sigfridsson temporarily joined the Anette Norberg rink as lead, and the team won a silver medal at the 2009 Mount Titlis World Women's Curling Championship, losing to China's Wang Bingyu in the final. Sigfridsson won a gold medal at the 2010 European Curling Championships with Viktorsson. In 2010-11, the Viktorsson rink would play in their first two Grand Slam events. They played in the 2010 Manitoba Lotteries Women's Curling Classic, winning 4 games before being eliminated, and at the 2011 Players' Championship, winning just two games.

=== 2011–present ===
In 2011, Viktorsson left the rink, and Sigfridsson took over as skip, but would still throw first stones. The team brought in Maria Prytz to throw last rocks. The team quickly became the top team in Sweden, and would represent the country at the 2011 European Curling Championships where they won a silver medal, losing to Scotland's Eve Muirhead rink. As Sweden's representative at the 2012 Ford World Women's Curling Championship, the Sigfridsson rink won the silver medal, losing to Switzerland's Mirjam Ott in the final match. The team won one WCT event in the season, the 2011 Credit Suisse Women's Masters Basel. They played in on Grand Slam event, the 2011 Manitoba Lotteries Women's Curling Classic, winning four games.

The team would again represent Sweden at the 2012 European Curling Championships where they won the bronze medal. Despite losing the 2013 Swedish final to Anette Norberg, the Sigfridsson rink was selected to represent Sweden at the 2013 World Women's Curling Championship. The team would again win a silver medal at the Worlds, losing to Scotland's Muirhead in the final. Sigfridsson and Muirhead would meet once again at the end of the season in the 2013 Players' Championship final, where she again lost to Muirhead. It would be the first time Sigfridsson would make the playoffs at a Grand Slam event. The team played in one other Slam that season, the 2012 Manitoba Lotteries Women's Curling Classic, winning four games. They won one Tour event, the 2012 Women's Masters Basel.

In November 2013, Sigfridsson led Sweden to another gold medal at the 2013 European Curling Championships. She continued this success towards the 2014 Winter Olympics, where she led Sweden to a silver medal, after losing to Canada's Jennifer Jones in the final. A month later, she represented Sweden at the 2014 Ford World Women's Curling Championship where she fared a much worse record, placing 5th. The team played in three Slams in the season, winning just two games at the 2013 Manitoba Liquor & Lotteries Women's Classic, losing in the quarterfinals of the 2013 Masters of Curling and losing in the semifinals of the 2014 Players' Championship.

The Sigfridsson rink started the 2014-15 season by winning the 2014 Stockholm Ladies Cup. She skipped Sweden at the 2015 World Women's Curling Championship, leading her team to a 5-6 round robin record, missing the playoffs. She would again skip team Sweden at the 2016 World Women's Curling Championship, leading her team to a worse 4-7 record. The next season the team replaced Prytz with Cecilia Östlund throwing last stones. They would not be named to represent Sweden internationally that season, having been replaced by the Anna Hasselborg rink.

== Personal life ==
Sigfridsson lives in Sundsvall.

== Grand Slam record ==
Key
| C | Champion |
| F | Lost in Final |
| SF | Lost in Semifinal |
| QF | Lost in Quarterfinals |
| R16 | Lost in the round of 16 |
| Q | Did not advance to playoffs |
| T2 | Played in Tier 2 event |
| DNP | Did not participate in event |
| N/A | Not a Grand Slam event that season |

| Event | 2010–11 | 2011–12 | 2012–13 | 2013–14 | 2014–15 | 2015–16 | 2016–17 | 2017–18 |
|---|---|---|---|---|---|---|---|---|
| Tour Challenge | N/A | N/A | N/A | N/A | N/A | DNP | Q | DNP |
| Masters | N/A | N/A | DNP | QF | F | Q | DNP | DNP |
| Canadian Open | N/A | N/A | N/A | N/A | DNP | Q | DNP | |
| Players' | Q | DNP | F | SF | Q | DNP | Q | |

=== Former events ===
| Event | 2010–11 | 2011–12 | 2012–13 | 2013–14 |
|---|---|---|---|---|
| Manitoba Liquor & Lotteries | Q | Q | Q | Q |
