= Michèle Jäggi =

Swiss curler

- Curler
- Born: 22 September 1987 (age 39)

Team
- Curling club: CC Bern, Bern, SUI
- Mixed doubles partner: Romano Meier

Curling career
- Member Association: Switzerland
- World Mixed Doubles Championship: 1 (2018)
Medal record
Representing Switzerland
World Mixed Doubles Championship
| Gold medal – first place | 2018 Östersund |
Winter Universiade
| Bronze medal – third place | 2013 Trentino |
| Bronze medal – third place | 2015 Granada |

Michèle Jäggi (born 22 September 1987) is a Swiss curler from Bern. She won gold at the 2018 World Mixed Doubles Curling Championship and won two bronze medals at the Winter Universiade.

== Career ==
Jäggi is a former Swiss junior champion. She first appeared on the international scene at the World Junior Curling Championships in 2006, finishing in fourth place after losing in the semifinals and the bronze medal game. She returned to the World Junior Curling Championships two years after, but failed to make the playoffs, finishing in sixth place.

Jäggi began to compete on the World Curling Tour in 2006, making appearances in various European events. She participated in the Swiss national curling championships in 2010, and finished in third place. During the 2011–12 curling season, she broke through with two World Curling Tour wins, at the Kamloops Crown of Curling and the International Bernese Ladies Cup. However, she was only able to repeat her result from the previous year at the Swiss national championships, finishing third again. Jäggi again participated at the Swiss national championships, but lost to Mirjam Ott in the final.

== Personal life ==
Jäggi is currently a business administration student. Her hobbies include snowboarding and travelling.

== Grand Slam record ==
| Event | 2012–13 | 2013–14 | 2014–15 | 2015–16 | 2016–17 | 2017–18 | 2018–19 | 2019–20 | 2020–21 | 2021–22 | 2022–23 | 2023–24 |
|---|---|---|---|---|---|---|---|---|---|---|---|---|
| Tour Challenge | N/A | N/A | N/A | DNP | DNP | DNP | DNP | DNP | N/A | N/A | DNP | T2 |
| Masters | Q | DNP | DNP | DNP | DNP | DNP | DNP | DNP | N/A | DNP | Q | DNP |
| Canadian Open | DNP | DNP | DNP | DNP | DNP | DNP | DNP | DNP | N/A | N/A | Q | DNP |
| Players' | Q | Q | DNP | DNP | DNP | DNP | DNP | N/A | DNP | DNP | DNP | DNP |

=== Former events ===
| Event | 2012–13 | 2013–14 | 2014–15 |
|---|---|---|---|
| Autumn Gold | Q | QF | DNP |
| Manitoba Liquor & Lotteries | DNP | QF | N/A |
| Colonial Square Ladies Classic | QF | F | Q |
