= Hannah Fleming =

Scottish curler

Medal record

Curling

Representing Scotland

World Junior Curling Championships
Gold medal – first place	2012 Östersund	
Silver medal – second place	2013 Sochi	

European Youth Olympic Winter Festival
Gold medal – first place	2009 Bielsko-Biała	

Scottish Women's Curling Championship
Gold medal – first place	2018 Perth	
Silver medal – second place	2011 Perth	
Silver medal – second place	2013 Perth	
Silver medal – second place	2014 Dumfries / Perth	
Silver medal – second place	2015 Perth	
Silver medal – second place	2017 Perth	
Bronze medal – third place	2016 Perth	

Hannah Fleming (born 3 October 1991 in Dumfries) is a Scottish curler from Lockerbie. She is a former World junior champion skip.

== Career ==
=== Youth ===
Fleming began her junior career by winning a gold medal at the 2009 European Youth Olympic Winter Festival, playing third for the Scottish team, skipped by Anna Sloan.

Fleming skipped Scotland at two straight World Junior Curling Championships. At the 2012 World Junior Curling Championships, she led her rink of Lauren Gray, Alice Spence and Abi Brown to a 7-2 round robin record. In the playoffs, they knocked off the Czechs (skip: Zuzana Hajkova) twice to claim the gold medal. At the 2013 World Junior Curling Championships, Fleming led her rink of Gray, Jennifer Dodds and Brown to an 8-1 round robin record. In the playoffs, they beat the Japanese team (skip: Sayaka Yoshimura) in the 1 vs. 2 game, but lost in the final to Team Russia, skipped by Alina Kovaleva.

Fleming capped off her youth career by skipping her Edinburgh Napier University team at the 2013 Winter Universiade with teammates Gray, Dodds and Spence. The team would finish the round robin with a 6–3 record, but lost both their playoff matches, settling for fourth place.

=== Women's ===
Fleming was invited to play alternate for Scotland (skipped by Kerry Barr) at the 2014 Ford World Women's Curling Championship. The team finished a disappointing 11th place, with Fleming losing all four games she played in.

Fleming played third for Scotland at the 2014 European Mixed Curling Championship on a team skipped by Kyle Smith. They would finish fourth.

After finishing runners-up at the Scottish Women's Curling Championship (often to Eve Muirhead) for many years, Fleming and her rink of Dodds, Spence and Vicky Wright finally won the Muirhead-less 2018 Scottish championship. The team had to playoff against Muirhead, who was absent at the Olympics in order to qualify for the 2018 Ford World Women's Curling Championship. The team upset the fatigued Muirhead rink in two straight games in the best of three playoff in order to play in the World championships.

== Personal life ==
Fleming is employed as an estate agent.
