= Lorna Vevers =

Scottish curler and Olympian (1981)

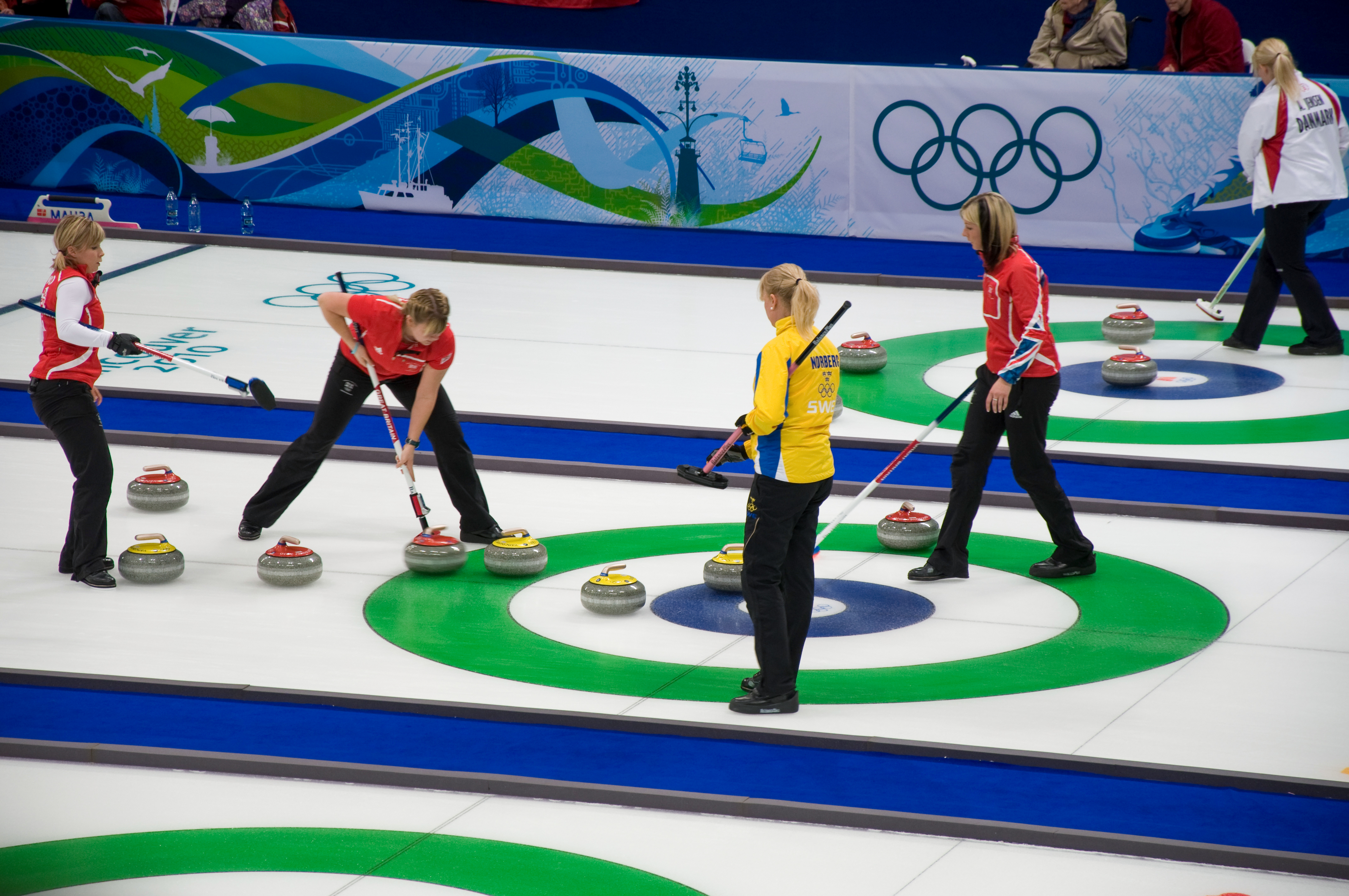
- 2010 Winter Olympic Games; curling game Great Britain-Sweden; left to right: Kelly Wood, Lorna Vevers, Anette Norberg and Eve Muirhead

Personal information
- Born: 31 January 1981 (age 45) Dumfries, Scotland
- Height: 1.70 m (5 ft 7 in)
- Weight: 73 kg (11 st 7 lb; 161 lb)

Sport
- Country: Scotland; United Kingdom
- Sport: Curling
Medal record
Curling
Representing Scotland
World Championships
Silver medal – second place	2010 Swift Current
Bronze medal – third place	2007 Aomori
European Championships
Silver medal – second place	2007 Füssen
Silver medal – second place	2010 Champéry

Lorna Vevers (born 31 January 1981 in Dumfries) is a Scottish curler living in Lockerbie. She won a bronze medal at the 2007 World Championships. She played lead for Team Great Britain at the 2010 Winter Olympics.

Vevers' 2010 Olympic coach was Nancy Murdoch, also from the Lockerbie rink.

== Teammates ==
2007 Aormori World Championships

Kelly Wood, Skip

Jackie Lockhart, Third

Lindsay Wood, Lead

Karen Addison, Alternate

2009 Aberdeen European Championships

2010 Vancouver Olympic Games

Eve Muirhead, Skip

Jackie Lockhart, Third

Kelly Wood, Second

Karen Addison, Alternate
