= Manuela Siegrist =

Swiss curler

- Curler
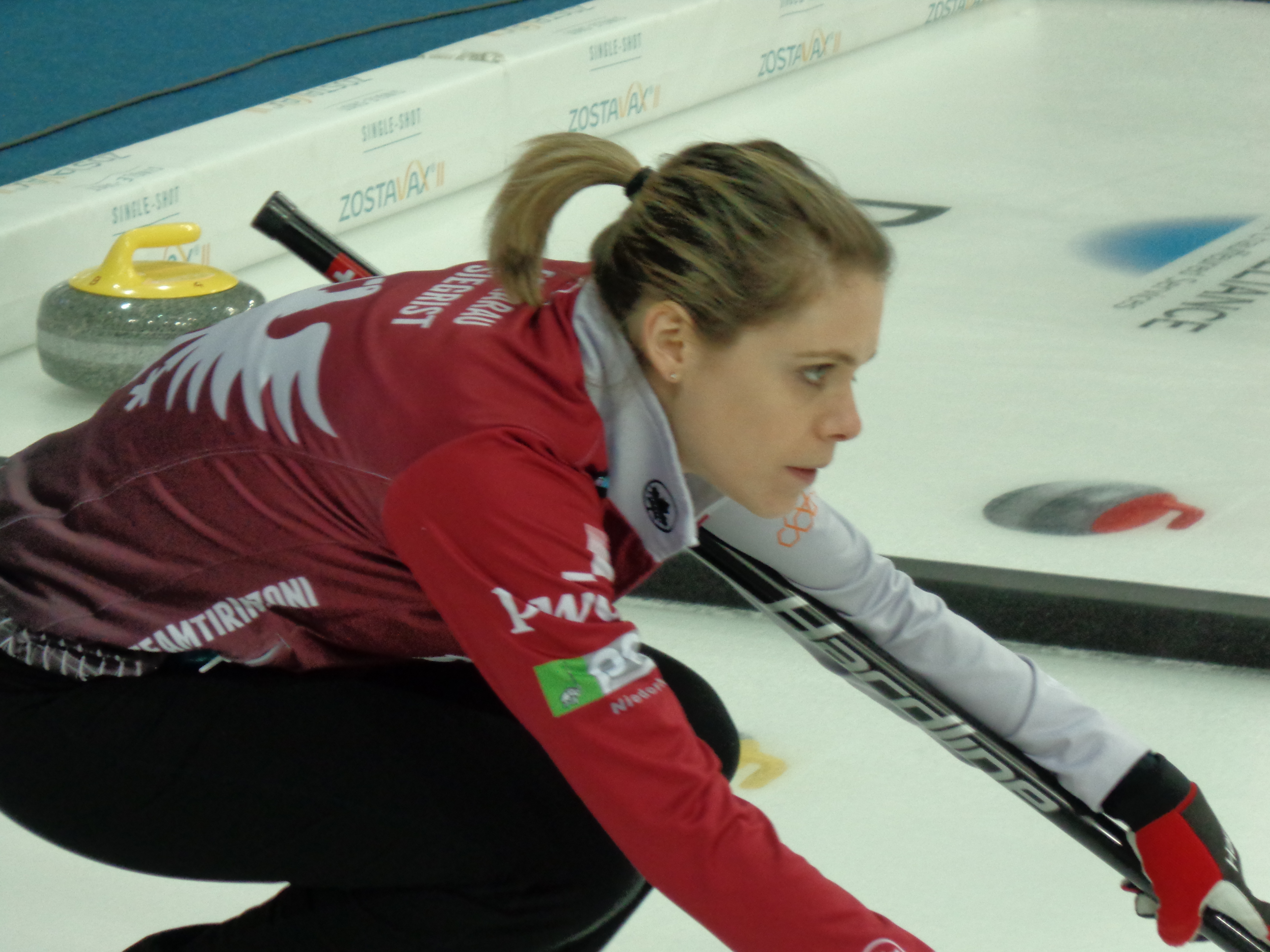
- Siegrist at the Players Championship 2018
- Born: 18 May 1990 (age 36); Basel, Switzerland

Team
- Curling club: CC Aarau, Aarau, SUI

Curling career
- Member Association: Switzerland
- World Championship: 1 (2013)
- European Championship: 2 (2011, 2017)
- Olympic: 1 (2018)
- Grand Slam victories: 1 (2015 Tour Challenge)
Medal record
Women's curling
Representing Switzerland
European Mixed Curling Championship
Gold medal – first place	2011 Tårnby

Manuela Siegrist (born 18 May 1990) is a Swiss curler. Playing third for Silvana Tirinzoni's team which represented Switzerland at the 2018 Winter Olympics, she stepped away from the game at the end of the 2017–18 season.

== Personal life ==
Siegrist is currently a masters student in economics at the University of Basel.
