= Sarah Reid (curler) =

Scottish curler

- Curler
- Born: 20 August 1985 (age 41); Paisley, Scotland

Team
- Curling club: Stewarton Heather CC, Howwood, SCO

Curling career
- Member Association: Scotland
- World Championship: 3 (2010, 2015, 2016)
- European Championship: 3 (2012, 2014, 2015)
- Grand Slam victories: 4 (2014 Colonial Square, 2014 Canadian Open, 2015 Players', 2016 Players')
Medal record
Women's curling
Representing Scotland
World Championships
| Silver medal – second place | 2010 Swift Current |
European Championships
| Silver medal – second place | 2012 Karlstad |
| Silver medal – second place | 2015 Esbjerg |
| Bronze medal – third place | 2014 Champéry |
World Junior Championships
| Gold medal – first place | 2007 Eveleth |

Sarah Reid (born 20 August 1985 in Paisley, Scotland) is a Scottish curler from Glasgow.

She was alternate for the Scottish team at the 2010 Ford World Women's Curling Championship in Swift Current, Saskatchewan, Canada.
