= WCT Latvian Mixed Doubles Curling Cup =

World Curling Tour event

The WCT Latvian Mixed Doubles Curling Cup is an annual mixed doubles curling series on the ISS Mixed Doubles World Curling Tour. There are two events held annually, usually held a week apart in April. They take place at the Kērlinga halle in Riga, Latvia. For the 2020–21 curling season, the first event was held in November 2020, while the second event was held in April 2021. For the 2021–22 curling season, the first event was held in November 2021, while the second event was held in April 2022.

The purse for both events is €1,000 and the event categorization for both events is 100 (highest calibre is 1000).

The event has been held since 2016, making it one of the oldest mixed doubles tour events. The event usually attracts some of the top teams in Europe, but due to the COVID-19 pandemic in Latvia, the 2020 event was mostly played by Latvian teams. It has been part of the tour since 2017.

== Past champions ==
Year	Winning pair	Runner up pair	Third place	Fourth place	Purse (€)
2016 1	(Sweden) Camilla Noréen / Per Noréen	(Switzerland) Jenny Perret / Martin Rios	(Scotland) Judith McCleary / Lee McCleary	(Russia) Victoria Moiseeva / Petr Dron	
2016 2	(Scotland) Gina Aitken / Bruce Mouat	(Russia) Anastasia Bryzgalova / Alexander Krushelnitskiy	(China) Wang Rui / Ba Dexin	(Germany) Andrea Schöpp / Rainer Schöpp	
2017 1	(Russia) Anastasia Bryzgalova / Alexander Krushelnitskiy	(Switzerland) Jenny Perret / Martin Rios	(Italy) Lucrezia Laurenti / Marco Pascale	(Estonia) Kristiine Lill / Martin Lill	
2017 2	(Russia) Anastasia Bryzgalova / Alexander Krushelnitskiy	(Germany) Julia Meißner / Andy Büttner	(Scotland) Gina Aitken / Bruce Mouat	(Latvia) Ieva Rudzīte / Artis Zentelis	
2018 1	(Russia) Anastasia Moskaleva / Alexander Eremin	(Italy) Veronica Zappone / Simone Gonin	(Estonia) Marie Turmann / Harri Lill	(Hungary) Ildikó Szekeres / György Nagy	€1,000
2018 2	(Scotland) Jayne Stirling / Fraser Kingan	(Switzerland) Michèle Jäggi / Sven Michel	(Estonia) Marie Turmann / Harri Lill	(Czech Republic) Zuzana Hájková / Tomáš Paul	€1,000
2019 1	(Russia) Anastasia Moskaleva / Alexander Eremin	(China) Liu Sijia / Hao Zhaohui	(Switzerland) Jenny Perret / Martin Rios	(Estonia) Marie Turmann / Harri Lill	€1,000
2019 2	(China) Fu Yiwei / Zou Dejia	(Czech Republic) Zuzana Paulová / Tomáš Paul	(Australia) Tahli Gill / Dean Hewitt	(Turkey) Dilşat Yıldız / Uğurcan Karagöz	€1,000
2020	(Latvia) Daina Barone / Arnis Veidamanis	(Latvia) Ieva Rudzīte / Artis Zentelis	(Latvia) Iluta Linde / Janis Rudzitis	(Latvia) Dace Zīle / Jānis Vonda	€1,000
2021 (Apr.)	(Czech Republic) Zuzana Paulová / Tomáš Paul	(Estonia) Marie Kaldvee / Harri Lill	(Hungary) Ildikó Szekeres / György Nagy	(Latvia) Ieva Rudzīte / Artis Zentelis	€1,000
2021 (Nov.)	(Estonia) Marie Kaldvee / Harri Lill	(Latvia) Ieva Rudzīte / Artis Zentelis	(Latvia) Katrīna Gaidule / Ansis Regza	(Latvia) Daina Barone / Ritvars Gulbis	€1,000
2022 (Apr.)	(Estonia) Karoliine Kaare / Harri Lill	(Czech Republic) Julie Zelingrová / Vít Chabičovský	(Latvia) Daina Barone / Arnis Veidamanis	(Latvia) Ieva Rudzīte / Artis Zentelis	€1,000
2022 (Nov.)	(Norway) Eirin Mesloe / Wilhelm Næss	(Latvia) Evita Regža / Renārs Freidensons	(Estonia) Triin Madisson / Karl Kukner	(Latvia) Dace Regža / Ansis Regža	€3,500
2023 (Apr.)	(Hungary) Linda Joó / Lőrinc Tatár	(Estonia) Marie Turmann / Harri Lill	(Czech Republic) Julie Zelingrová / Vít Chabičovský	(Canada) Laura Knowles / Pascal Michaud	€1,000
2023 (Nov.)	(Sweden) Linnea Nilsson / Simon Olofsson	(Estonia) Cathy Vivien Vahi / Marten Padama	(Latvia) Katrīna Gaidule / Roberts Reinis Buncis	(Lithuania) Mintautė Jurkutė / Paulius Rymeikis	€1,000
2024 (Apr.)	(Japan) Tori Koana / Go Aoki	(Latvia) Līga Avena / Aivars Avotiņš	(Lithuania) Akvilė Rykovė / Konstantin Rykov	(Lithuania) Mintautė Jurkutė / Paulius Rymeikis	€1,000
2024 (Nov.)	(Latvia) Katrīna Gaidule / Roberts Reinis Buncis	(Latvia) Evelīna Barone / Kristaps Zass	(Norway) Sylvi Hausstätter / Sondre Svorkmo-Lundberg	(Norway) Andrine Vollan Rønning / Harald Dæhlin	€1,000
2025 (Apr).	(Czech Republic) Zuzana Paulová / Tomáš Paul	(Latvia) Katrīna Gaidule / Roberts Reinis Buncis	(Latvia) Santa Blumberga-Bērziņa / Arnis Veidemanis	(Norway) Sylvi Hausstätter / Sondre Svorkmo-Lundberg	€1,000
2025 (Nov).	(Latvia) Katrīna Gaidule / Roberts Reinis Buncis	(Norway) Sylvi Hausstätter / Sondre Svorkmo-Lundberg	(South Korea) Kim Aye-on / Shin Eun-jun	(Latvia) Dārta Regža / Ansis Regža	€1,000
