= 2013 Stockholm Ladies Cup =

- Host city: Stockholm, Sweden
- Arena: Danderyd Curling Arena
- Dates: September 20–22
- Winner: (Switzerland) Silvana Tirinzoni
- Curling club: CC Aarau, Aarau
- Skip: Silvana Tirinzoni
- Third: Marlene Albrecht
- Second: Esther Neuenschwander
- Lead: Manuela Siegrist
- Finalist: (Switzerland) Michèle Jäggi

The 2013 Stockholm Ladies Cup was held from September 20 to 22 at the Danderyd Curling Arena in Stockholm, Sweden as part of the 2013–14 World Curling Tour. The event was held in a triple-knockout format, and the purse for the event was 200,000 SEK, of which the winner, Silvana Tirinzoni, received 70,000 SEK. Tirinzoni defeated Michèle Jäggi in the final with a score of 3–2.

== Teams ==
The teams are listed as follows:

Skip	Third	Second	Lead	Alternate	Locale
Greta Aurell	Tilde Vermelin	Camilla Schnabel	Almida de Val		Harnosands, Sweden
Binia Feltscher	Irene Schori	Franziska Kaufmann	Christine Urech		Flims, Switzerland
Hannah Fleming	Lauren Gray	Jennifer Dodds	Alice Spence		Stirling, Scotland
Michèle Jäggi	Marisa Winkelhausen	Stéphanie Jäggi	Melanie Barbezat		Bern, Switzerland
Jonna McManus	Sara McManus	Anna Huhta	Sofia Mabergs		Gävle, Sweden
Victorya Moiseeva	Nkeiruka Ezekh	Aleksandra Saitova	Ekaterina Antonova		Moscow, Russia
Cissi Östlund	Sabina Kraupp	Sara Carlsson	Paulina Stein		Karlstad, Sweden
Sanna Puustinen	Oona Kauste	Heidi Hossi	Marjo Hippi		Helsinki, Finland
Evita Regža	Dace Regža	Ieva Bērziņa	Žaklīna Litauniece		Jelgava, Latvia
Anna Sidorova	Liudmila Privivkova	Margarita Fomina	Ekaterina Galkina		Moscow, Russia
Maria Prytz (fourth)	Christina Bertrup	Maria Wennerström	Margaretha Sigfridsson (skip)		Härnösand, Sweden
Iveta Staša-Šaršūne	Ieva Krusta	Zanda Bikše	Dace Munča	Una Ģērmane	Jelgava, Latvia
Silvana Tirinzoni	Marlene Albrecht	Esther Neuenschwander	Manuela Siegrist		Aarau, Switzerland
Lorna Vevers	Sarah Reid	Rebecca Kesley	Rachel Hannen		Stirling, Scotland
Isabella Wranå	Jennie Wåhlin	Elin Lövstrand	Fanny Sjöberg		Sundbyberg, Sweden
Olga Zharkova	Julia Portunova	Alisa Tregub	Julia Guzieva	Oksana Gertova	Kaliningrad, Russia

== Knockout results ==
The draw is listed as follows:

=== A event ===
First Knockout		Semifinals		Qualifier 1
(Russia) Anna Sidorova	3
(Sweden) Jonna McManus	5	(Sweden) Jonna McManus	3
(Sweden) Greta Aurell	5	(Switzerland) Michèle Jäggi	5
(Switzerland) Michèle Jäggi	6			(Switzerland) Michèle Jäggi	7
(Switzerland) Binia Feltscher	7			(Switzerland) Binia Feltscher	4
(Sweden) Isabella Wranå	1	(Switzerland) Binia Feltscher	4
(Russia) Victorya Moiseeva	6	(Russia) Victorya Moiseeva	3
(Latvia) Evita Regža	3

First Knockout		Semifinals		Qualifier 2
(Sweden) Margaretha Sigfridsson	8
(Finland) Sanna Puustinen	1	(Sweden) Margaretha Sigfridsson	7
(Russia) Olga Zharkova	4	(Scotland) Hannah Fleming	4
(Scotland) Hannah Fleming	6			(Sweden) Margaretha Sigfridsson	7
(Sweden) Cissi Östlund	2			(Switzerland) Silvana Tirinzoni	4
(Scotland) Lorna Vevers	3	(Scotland) Lorna Vevers	3
(Switzerland) Silvana Tirinzoni	6	(Switzerland) Silvana Tirinzoni	8
(Latvia) Iveta Staša–Šaršūne	3

=== B event ===
Second Knockout		Semifinals		Qualifier 3
(Russia) Anna Sidorova	11
(Sweden) Greta Aurell	1	(Russia) Anna Sidorova	6
(Sweden) Isabella Wranå	4	(Sweden) Isabella Wranå	3
(Latvia) Evita Regža	2			(Russia) Anna Sidorova	3
				(Switzerland) Binia Feltscher	5

Second Knockout		Semifinals		Qualifier 4
(Finland) Sanna Puustinen	6
(Russia) Olga Zharkova	8	(Russia) Olga Zharkova	4
(Sweden) Cissi Östlund	7	(Sweden) Cissi Östlund	8
(Latvia) Iveta Staša–Šaršūne	4			(Sweden) Cissi Östlund	5
				(Switzerland) Silvana Tirinzoni	7

Second Knockout		Qualifier 5
(Sweden) Jonna McManus	5
(Russia) Victorya Moiseeva	6	(Russia) Victorya Moiseeva	7
(Scotland) Hannah Fleming	7	(Scotland) Hannah Fleming	8
(Scotland) Lorna Vevers	5

=== C event ===
Third Knockout		Semifinals		Qualifier 6
(Sweden) Greta Aurell	2
(Latvia) Evita Regža	4	(Latvia) Evita Regža	6
		(Scotland) Lorna Vevers	5
				(Latvia) Evita Regža	6
				(Russia) Victorya Moiseeva	7

Third Knockout		Semifinals		Qualifier 7
(Finland) Sanna Puustinen	6
(Latvia) Iveta Staša–Šaršūne	4	(Finland) Sanna Puustinen	6
		(Sweden) Jonna McManus	4
				(Finland) Sanna Puustinen	1
				(Russia) Anna Sidorova	8

Third Knockout		Qualifier 8
(Sweden) Isabella Wranå	1
(Russia) Olga Zharkova	6	(Russia) Olga Zharkova	1
		(Sweden) Cissi Östlund	4

== Playoffs ==
Quarterfinals
(Russia) Victorya Moiseeva	8
(Sweden) Margaretha Sigfridsson	7
(Switzerland) Silvana Tirinzoni	5
(Russia) Anna Sidorova	3
(Switzerland) Michèle Jäggi	8
(Scotland) Hannah Fleming	4
(Switzerland) Binia Feltscher	3
(Sweden) Cissi Östlund	5

Semifinals
(Russia) Victorya Moiseeva	3
(Switzerland) Silvana Tirinzoni	6
(Switzerland) Michèle Jäggi	7
(Sweden) Cissi Östlund	1

Final
(Switzerland) Silvana Tirinzoni	3
(Switzerland) Michèle Jäggi	2

Third-place game
1	(Russia) Victorya Moiseeva	8
2	(Sweden) Cissi Östlund	5
