= Ieva Bērziņa =

Latvian female curler

- Curler ♀
- Born: 19 November 1967 (age 58); Riga, Latvia

Team
- Curling club: Rudzīšu kērlinga klubs, Riga

Curling career
- Member Association: Latvia
- World Championship: 1 (2014)
- European Championship: 1 (2013)
- Other appearances: European Mixed Championship: 1 (2010)
Medal record
Curling
Latvian Women's Championship
Gold medal – first place	2013
Gold medal – first place	2014
Silver medal – second place	2012
Silver medal – second place	2017
Bronze medal – third place	2015
Bronze medal – third place	2016

Ieva Bērziņa (born 19 November 1967 in Riga) is a Latvian female curler.

At the national level, she is a two-time Latvian women's champion (2013, 2014).

== Teams ==
=== Women's ===
Season	Skip	Third	Second	Lead	Alternate	Coach	Events
2002–03	Dace Smeltere	Ieva Bērziņa	Maija Smeltere	Sanita Saulgrieze	Solvita Dūdiņa, Baiba Kurmīte		LWCC 2003 (4th)
2003–04	Solvita Dūdiņa	Ieva Bērziņa	Maija Smeltere	Sanita Saulgrieze	Baiba Kurmīte		LWCC 2004 (5th)
2004–05	Solvita Dūdiņa	Ieva Bērziņa	Maija Smeltere	Sanita Saulgrieze	Baiba Kurmīte		LWCC 2005 (7th)
2006–07	Ieva Bērziņa	Maija Smeltere	Aiva Kolibere	Anita Pētersone	Iveta Zālīte		LWCC 2007 (4th)
2007–08	Ieva Bērziņa	Maija Smeltere	Ilva Beizaka	Sanita Saulgrieze			LWCC 2008 (7th)
2008–09	Agrita Romanovska	Ieva Bērziņa	Maija Smeltere	Sanita Saulgrieze			LWCC 2009 (7th)
2009–10	Anita Pētersone	Agrita Romanovska	Ieva Bērziņa	Maija Smeltere			LWCC 2010 (6th)
2010–11	Ieva Bērziņa	Sanita Saulgrieze	Agrita Romanovska	Anita Pētersone			LWCC 2011 (5th)
2011–12	Evita Regža	Dace Regža	Ieva Bērziņa	Žaklīna Litauniece			LWCC 2012 (silver)
2012–13	Evita Regža	Dace Regža	Ieva Bērziņa	Žaklīna Litauniece		Ansis Regža	LWCC 2013 (gold)
2013–14	Evita Regža	Dace Regža	Ieva Bērziņa	Žaklīna Litauniece	Anete Zābere (LWCC); Iluta Linde (ECC, WCC)	Ansis Regža	ECC 2013 (7th); LWCC 2014 (gold); WCC 2014 (12th)
2014–15	Iluta Linde	Ieva Bērziņa	Una Ģērmane	Žaklīna Litauniece	Ieva Krusta	Arnis Veidemanis	LWCC 2015 (bronze)
2015–16	Santa Blumberga (fourth)	Iluta Linde (skip)	Ieva Bērziņa	Una Ģērmane	Evija Dompalma-Linuža		LWCC 2016 (bronze)
2016–17	Ieva Bērziņa	Una Ģērmane	Rasa Lubarte	Evija Dompalma-Linuža	Antra Zvane		LWCC 2017 (silver)
2018–19	Evita Regža	Ieva Bērziņa	Vineta Smilga	Sabīne Jeske	Anete Zābere	Ansis Regža	LWCC 2019 (4th)

=== Mixed ===
Season	Skip	Third	Second	Lead	Alternate	Events
2004–05	Andris Vārna	Juris Kuzņecovs	Aivars Kuzņecovs	Sanita Saulgrieze	Maija Smeltere, Ieva Bērziņa	LMxCC 2005 (10th)
2005–06	Juris Bogdanovs	Janis Ozollapa	Iveta Ozollapa	Baiba Dzelme	Tālivaldis Bratkus, Ieva Bērziņa	LMxCC 2006 (10th)
2007–08	Aivars Gulbis	Ieva Bērziņa	Arnis Veidemanis	Ieva Cielava		LMxCC 2008 (8th)
2010–11	Artis Zentelis	Zanda Bikše	Pēteris Šveisbergs	Ieva Bērziņa	Ieva Krusta	EMxCC 2010 (14th)
2010–11	Artis Zentelis	Ieva Bērziņa	Jānis Klīve	Zanda Bikše	Kitija Zaķe	LMxCC 2011 (silver)
2011–12	Pēteris Šveisbergs	Ieva Bērziņa	Ivars Černajs	Žaklīna Litauniece	Anete Zābere	LMxCC 2012 (4th)
2013–14	Aldis Abrickis	Ineta Mača	Andris Bremanis Jun	Ieva Bērziņa		LMxCC 2014 (silver)

=== Mixed doubles ===
Season	Female	Male	Events
2016–17	Ieva Bērziņa	Jānis Rēdlihs	LMDCC 2017 (6th)
