= Latvian Women's Curling Championship =

The Latvian Women's Curling Championship (Latvian: Latvijas kērlinga čempionāts sievietēm) is the national championship of women's curling in Latvia. It has been held annually since 2002. It is organized by the Latvian Curling Association (Latvian: Latvijas Kērlinga Asociācija).

== List of champions ==
Year	Winning team	Team line-up: skip (marked bold), third, second, lead, alternate(s), coach
2002	Jelgava 2	Evita Regža, Dace Regža, Ieva Pikšena, Una Ģērmane, alternates: Ilva Beizaka, Iveta Ozollapa
2003	Ledenes	Zanda Bikše, Iveta Staša, Ieva Pikšena, Una Ģērmane, alternates: Dace Regža, Evita Regža
2004	Lauvas	Inese Bernere, Ineta Mača, Inese Straume, Ilona Ratniece, alternates: Dace Munča, Līga Caune, coach: Diāna Andersone
2005	Ledenes	Zanda Bikše, Ieva Pikšena, Iveta Staša, Una Ģērmane, alternate: Inese Dobrā
2006	Nicoll	Evita Regža, Dace Regža, Solvita Gulbe, Anete Zābere, coach: Ansis Regža
2007	Nicoll	Evita Regža, Dace Regža, Solvita Gulbe, Anete Zābere, coach: Ansis Regža
2008	Ledenes	Zanda Bikše, Una Ģērmane, Ieva Krusta, Iveta Staša-Šaršūne, alternate: Dace Munča, coach: Normunds Šaršūns
2009	Ledenes	Iveta Staša-Šaršūne, Ieva Krusta, Zanda Bikše, Una Ģērmane, alternate: Dace Munča, coach: Normunds Šaršūns
2010	Nicoll	Evita Regža, Vineta Smilga, Dace Regža, Anete Zābere, alternate: Dace Pastare, coach: Ansis Regža
2011	Nicoll	Evita Regža, Vineta Smilga, Dace Regža, Dace Pastare, alternate: Anete Zābere, coach: Ansis Regža
2012	Jelgavas kērlinga klubs / Staša-Šaršūne	Iveta Staša-Šaršūne, Ieva Krusta, Zanda Bikše, Dace Munča, alternate: Una Ģērmane
2013	Nicoll/ Regža	Evita Regža, Dace Regža, Ieva Bērziņa, Žaklīna Litauniece, coach: Ansis Regža
2014	Nicoll/ Regža	Evita Regža, Dace Regža, Ieva Bērziņa, Žaklīna Litauniece, alternate: Anete Zābere, coach: Ansis Regža
2015	Nicoll/ Regža	Evita Regža, Dace Regža, Sabīne Jeske, Jeļena Rudzīte, alternate: Anete Zābere, coach: Ansis Regža
2016	Jelgavas kērlinga klubs / Staša-Šaršūne	Iveta Staša-Šaršūne, Ieva Krusta, Zanda Bikše, Evelīna Barone, alternate: Dace Munča
2017	Jelgavas kērlinga klubs / Rudzīte	Ieva Rudzīte, Līga Avena, Daina Barone, Rasa Brūna, alternate: Ieva Palma
2018	Jelgavas kērlinga klubs / Rudzīte	Ieva Rudzīte, Līga Avena, Daina Barone, Ieva Palma, alternate: Zane Ilze Brakovska, coach: Artis Zentelis
2019	Jelgavas kērlinga klubs / Staša-Šaršūne	Iveta Staša-Šaršūne, Santa Blumberga, Ieva Krusta, Evelīna Barone
2020	Jelgavas kērlinga klubs / Staša-Šaršūne	Santa Blumberga-Bērziņa, Tīna Siliņa, Evelīna Barone, Iveta Staša-Šaršūne, coach: Ritvars Gulbis
2021	Jelgavas kērlinga klubs / Barone	Evelīna Barone, Rēzija Ieviņa, Veronika Apse, Ērika Patrīcija Bitmete, Letīcija Ieviņa, coach: Iveta Staša-Šaršūne
2022	Jelgavas kērlinga klubs (JKK) / Blumberga-Bērziņa	Ieva Rudzīte, Tīna Siliņa, Ieva Krusta, Santa Blumberga-Bērziņa, coach: Ritvars Gulbis

== Championships won by curler ==
As of 2022

Curler	1st place, gold medalist(s)
Dace Regža	9
Evita Regža	9
Iveta Staša-Šaršūne	8
Zanda Bikše	6
Una Ģērmane	6
Anete Zābere	6
Ieva Krusta	5
Dace Munča	5
Evelīna Barone	4
Santa Blumberga-Bērziņa (Santa Blumberga)	3
Ieva Pikšena	3
Līga Avena	2
Daina Barone	2
Ieva Bērziņa	2
Solvita Gulbe	2
Žaklīna Litauniece	2
Ieva Palma	2
Dace Pastare	2
Ieva Rudzīte	2
Vineta Smilga	2
Veronika Apse	1
Ilva Beizaka	1
Inese Bernere	1
Ērika Patrīcija Bitmete	1
Zane Ilze Brakovska	1
Rasa Brūna	1
Līga Caune	1
Inese Dobrā	1
Letīcija Ieviņa	1
Rēzija Ieviņa	1
Sabīne Jeske	1
Ineta Mača	1
Iveta Ozollapa	1
Ilona Ratniece	1
Jeļena Rudzīte	1
Tīna Siliņa	1
Inese Straume	1

== See also ==
- Latvian Men's Curling Championship
- Latvian Mixed Curling Championship
- Latvian Mixed Doubles Curling Championship
- Latvian Junior Mixed Doubles Curling Championship
