= 2022 Women's Masters Basel =

World Curling Tour event

- Host city: Arlesheim, Switzerland
- Arena: Curlingzentrum Region Basel
- Dates: September 23–25
- Winner: (Switzerland) Team Keiser
- Curling club: CC St. Moriz, St. Moritz
- Skip: Raphaela Keiser
- Fourth: Selina Witschonke
- Third: Elena Mathis
- Lead: Marina Lörtscher
- Finalist: (Switzerland) Michèle Jäggi

The 2022 Women's Masters Basel was held from September 23 to 25 at the Curlingzentrum Region Basel in Arlesheim, Switzerland as part of the World Curling Tour. The event was held in a round-robin format with a purse of 32,000 CHF. It was the first women's World Curling Tour event of the 2022–23 curling season.

== Teams ==
The teams are listed as follows:

Skip	Third	Second	Lead	Alternate	Locale
Evelīna Barone	Rēzija Ieviņa	Veronika Apse	Ērika Patrīcija Bitmete	Letīcija Ieviņa	Riga, Latvia
Kathrine Blackham	Jana Hoffmann	Johanna Blackham	Selina Studer	Anika Meier	Basel, Switzerland
Santa Blumberga-Bērziņa	Ieva Rudzīte	Katrīna Gaidule	Tīna Siliņa		Riga, Latvia
Stefania Constantini	Marta Lo Deserto	Angela Romei	Giulia Zardini Lacedelli		Cortina d'Ampezzo, Italy
Madeleine Dupont	Jasmin Lander (Note: Jasmin Lander spared for Mathilde Halse.)	Denise Dupont	My Larsen		Hvidovre, Denmark
Beth Farmer	Hailey Duff	Kirstin Bousie	Katie McMillan	Amy MacDonald	Stirling, Scotland
Corrie Hürlimann	Melina Bezzola	Nadine Bärtschiger	Anna Gut	Celine Schwizgebel	Zug, Switzerland
Michèle Jäggi	Stefanie Berset	Lara Stocker	Sarah Müller	Irene Schori	Bern, Switzerland
Daniela Jentsch	Emira Abbes	Mia Höhne	Analena Jentsch		Füssen, Germany
Asuka Kanai	Ami Enami	Junko Nishimuro	Mone Ryokawa		Karuizawa, Japan
Selina Witschonke (Fourth)	Elena Mathis	Raphaela Keiser (Skip)	Marina Lörtscher		St. Moritz, Switzerland
Aneta Lipińska	Ewa Nogły	Marta Leszczyńska	Magdalena Kołodziej		Łódź, Poland
Eirin Mesloe	Torild Bjørnstad	Nora Østgård	Ingeborg Forbregd		Lillehammer, Norway
Rebecca Morrison	Gina Aitken	Sophie Sinclair	Sophie Jackson		Stirling, Scotland
Xenia Schwaller	Fabienne Rieder	Marion Wüest	Selina Gafner	Selina Rychiger	Zurich, Switzerland
Kim Sutor	Lena Kapp	Elisa Scheuerl	Anne Kapp		Füssen, Germany
Alina Pätz (Fourth)	Silvana Tirinzoni (Skip)	Carole Howald	Briar Schwaller-Hürlimann		Aarau, Switzerland
Isabella Wranå	Almida de Val	Linda Stenlund	Maria Larsson	Jennie Wåhlin	Sundbyberg, Sweden
Dilşat Yıldız	Öznur Polat	Berfin Şengül	İfayet Şafak Çalıkuşu	Mihriban Polat	Erzurum, Turkey
Alžběta Zelingrová	Aneta Müllerová	Michaela Baudyšová	Klára Svatoňová		Prague, Czech Republic

== Round robin standings ==
Final Round Robin Standings

Key
Teams to Playoffs

Pool A	W	L	PF	PA	SO
(Switzerland) Silvana Tirinzoni	3	1	26	17	9
(Norway) Eirin Mesloe	2	2	28	22	4
(Switzerland) Corrie Hürlimann	2	2	28	24	7
(Japan) Asuka Kanai	2	2	17	21	11
(Latvia) Evelīna Barone	1	3	12	27	17

Pool B	W	L	PF	PA	SO
(Sweden) Isabella Wranå	4	0	34	15	14
(Scotland) Rebecca Morrison	3	1	25	20	3
(Switzerland) Michèle Jäggi	2	2	24	21	2
(Latvia) Santa Blumberga-Bērziņa	1	3	20	28	19
(Germany) Kim Sutor	0	4	13	32	13

Pool C	W	L	PF	PA	SO
(Switzerland) Xenia Schwaller	4	0	24	14	18
(Germany) Daniela Jentsch	2	2	23	22	5
(Czech Republic) Alžběta Zelingrová	2	2	21	16	12
(Scotland) Beth Farmer	1	3	20	19	10
(Poland) Aneta Lipińska	1	3	16	33	15

Pool D	W	L	PF	PA	SO
(Switzerland) Raphaela Keiser	4	0	25	18	16
(Denmark) Madeleine Dupont	3	1	26	19	8
(Italy) Stefania Constantini	2	2	28	20	1
(Turkey) Dilşat Yıldız	1	3	19	25	6
(Switzerland) Katherine Blackham	0	4	10	26	20

== Round robin results ==
All draw times listed in Central European Time (UTC+01:00).

=== Draw 1 ===
Friday, September 23, 9:00 am

Sheet 1	1	2	3	4	5	6	7	8	Final
(Switzerland) Silvana Tirinzoni 🔨	1	0	0	0	0	1	2	X	4
(Japan) Asuka Kanai	0	0	0	1	0	0	0	X	1

Sheet 2	1	2	3	4	5	6	7	8	Final
(Latvia) Evelīna Barone 🔨	0	0	0	0	0	1	X	X	1
(Norway) Eirin Mesloe	2	2	1	2	2	0	X	X	9

Sheet 3	1	2	3	4	5	6	7	8	Final
(Sweden) Isabella Wranå	0	0	4	3	0	4	X	X	11
(Germany) Kim Sutor 🔨	1	1	0	0	2	0	X	X	4

Sheet 4	1	2	3	4	5	6	7	8	Final
(Germany) Daniela Jentsch 🔨	3	2	0	5	0	3	X	X	13
(Poland) Aneta Lipińska	0	0	1	0	1	0	X	X	2

Sheet 5	1	2	3	4	5	6	7	8	Final
(Scotland) Beth Farmer 🔨	3	0	1	0	2	2	X	X	8
(Czech Republic) Alžběta Zelingrová	0	1	0	1	0	0	X	X	2

=== Draw 2 ===
Friday, September 23, 12:00 pm

Sheet 1	1	2	3	4	5	6	7	8	Final
(Denmark) Madeleine Dupont 🔨	2	0	2	1	0	2	X	X	7
(Switzerland) Katherine Blackham	0	1	0	0	1	0	X	X	2

Sheet 2	1	2	3	4	5	6	7	8	Final
(Japan) Asuka Kanai 🔨	0	2	0	1	0	1	0	4	8
(Switzerland) Corrie Hürlimann	1	0	1	0	3	0	2	0	7

Sheet 3	1	2	3	4	5	6	7	8	Final
(Poland) Aneta Lipińska 🔨	1	0	0	0	2	2	0	0	5
(Switzerland) Xenia Schwaller	0	3	0	1	0	0	2	1	7

Sheet 4	1	2	3	4	5	6	7	8	Final
(Switzerland) Raphaela Keiser	2	1	0	0	0	2	0	1	6
(Turkey) Dilşat Yıldız 🔨	0	0	1	2	0	0	1	0	4

Sheet 5	1	2	3	4	5	6	7	8	Final
(Switzerland) Michèle Jäggi 🔨	0	1	1	0	2	3	X	X	7
(Latvia) Santa Blumberga-Bērziņa	1	0	0	1	0	0	X	X	2

=== Draw 3 ===
Friday, September 23, 3:30 pm

Sheet 1	1	2	3	4	5	6	7	8	Final
(Latvia) Santa Blumberga-Bērziņa	1	0	0	0	0	X	X	X	1
(Sweden) Isabella Wranå 🔨	0	1	3	3	2	X	X	X	9

Sheet 2	1	2	3	4	5	6	7	8	Final
(Czech Republic) Alžběta Zelingrová 🔨	0	0	2	0	3	1	2	X	8
(Germany) Daniela Jentsch	0	0	0	1	0	0	0	X	1

Sheet 3	1	2	3	4	5	6	7	8	Final
(Norway) Eirin Mesloe 🔨	2	0	2	0	2	0	0	0	6
(Switzerland) Silvana Tirinzoni	0	3	0	3	0	1	1	1	9

Sheet 4	1	2	3	4	5	6	7	8	Final
(Switzerland) Katherine Blackham	0	0	0	1	0	1	X	X	2
(Italy) Stefania Constantini 🔨	3	1	1	0	1	0	X	X	6

Sheet 5	1	2	3	4	5	6	7	8	Final
(Germany) Kim Sutor	0	0	1	0	1	0	0	X	2
(Scotland) Rebecca Morrison 🔨	2	0	0	1	0	0	3	X	6

=== Draw 4 ===
Friday, September 23, 7:00 pm

Sheet 1	1	2	3	4	5	6	7	8	Final
(Switzerland) Xenia Schwaller	0	0	0	2	0	0	0	2	4
(Scotland) Beth Farmer 🔨	0	0	1	0	1	1	0	0	3

Sheet 2	1	2	3	4	5	6	7	8	Final
(Turkey) Dilşat Yıldız 🔨	1	0	0	3	1	0	0	0	5
(Denmark) Madeleine Dupont	0	1	0	0	0	2	1	2	6

Sheet 3	1	2	3	4	5	6	7	8	9	Final
(Italy) Stefania Constantini 🔨	0	1	0	1	0	2	0	1	0	5
(Switzerland) Raphaela Keiser	0	0	3	0	1	0	1	0	1	6

Sheet 4	1	2	3	4	5	6	7	8	Final
(Scotland) Rebecca Morrison	1	0	2	0	1	0	0	3	7
(Switzerland) Michèle Jäggi 🔨	0	2	0	1	0	2	1	0	6

Sheet 5	1	2	3	4	5	6	7	8	Final
(Switzerland) Corrie Hürlimann 🔨	0	1	0	1	0	0	2	0	4
(Latvia) Evelīna Barone	0	0	1	0	1	3	0	1	6

=== Draw 5 ===
Saturday, September 24, 9:00 am

Sheet 1	1	2	3	4	5	6	7	8	Final
(Switzerland) Michèle Jäggi 🔨	0	2	0	1	0	2	0	X	5
(Germany) Kim Sutor	0	0	1	0	1	0	1	X	3

Sheet 2	1	2	3	4	5	6	7	8	9	Final
(Scotland) Beth Farmer 🔨	2	0	0	0	1	0	2	0	0	5
(Poland) Aneta Lipińska	0	1	1	1	0	1	0	1	2	7

Sheet 3	1	2	3	4	5	6	7	8	Final
(Latvia) Evelīna Barone	0	0	0	1	0	1	0	X	2
(Japan) Asuka Kanai 🔨	1	1	0	0	2	0	2	X	6

Sheet 4	1	2	3	4	5	6	7	8	Final
(Switzerland) Corrie Hürlimann 🔨	0	2	0	3	0	2	0	X	7
(Switzerland) Silvana Tirinzoni	0	0	1	0	2	0	2	X	5

Sheet 5	1	2	3	4	5	6	7	8	Final
(Switzerland) Xenia Schwaller	0	3	0	3	0	2	X	X	8
(Germany) Daniela Jentsch 🔨	0	0	2	0	1	0	X	X	3

=== Draw 6 ===
Saturday, September 24, 12:00 pm

Sheet 1	1	2	3	4	5	6	7	8	Final
(Norway) Eirin Mesloe 🔨	0	0	4	0	1	0	0	0	5
(Switzerland) Corrie Hürlimann	1	1	0	3	0	2	1	2	10

Sheet 2	1	2	3	4	5	6	7	8	Final
(Switzerland) Katherine Blackham 🔨	1	1	0	1	0	1	0	X	4
(Switzerland) Raphaela Keiser	0	0	4	0	2	0	1	X	7

Sheet 3	1	2	3	4	5	6	7	8	Final
(Scotland) Rebecca Morrison 🔨	1	0	0	0	1	0	2	0	4
(Sweden) Isabella Wranå	0	1	0	1	0	2	0	1	5

Sheet 4	1	2	3	4	5	6	7	8	Final
(Czech Republic) Alžběta Zelingrová 🔨	0	1	0	1	0	0	1	0	3
(Switzerland) Xenia Schwaller	0	0	1	0	2	1	0	1	5

Sheet 5	1	2	3	4	5	6	7	8	Final
(Denmark) Madeleine Dupont	0	1	2	0	1	0	3	1	8
(Italy) Stefania Constantini 🔨	1	0	0	3	0	2	0	0	6

=== Draw 7 ===
Saturday, September 24, 3:30 pm

Sheet 1	1	2	3	4	5	6	7	8	Final
(Poland) Aneta Lipińska	0	1	0	1	0	0	0	X	2
(Czech Republic) Alžběta Zelingrová 🔨	2	0	1	0	1	1	3	X	8

Sheet 2	1	2	3	4	5	6	7	8	Final
(Switzerland) Silvana Tirinzoni	0	2	0	1	0	2	3	X	8
(Latvia) Evelīna Barone 🔨	1	0	1	0	1	0	0	X	3

Sheet 3	1	2	3	4	5	6	7	8	Final
(Germany) Daniela Jentsch 🔨	0	0	2	0	2	2	0	X	6
(Scotland) Beth Farmer	1	0	0	1	0	0	2	X	4

Sheet 4	1	2	3	4	5	6	7	8	Final
(Germany) Kim Sutor 🔨	0	1	0	0	1	2	0	X	4
(Latvia) Santa Blumberga-Bērziņa	3	0	2	3	0	0	2	X	10

Sheet 5	1	2	3	4	5	6	7	8	Final
(Turkey) Dilşat Yıldız	0	2	1	1	0	2	X	X	6
(Switzerland) Katherine Blackham 🔨	2	0	0	0	0	0	X	X	2

=== Draw 8 ===
Saturday, September 24, 7:00 pm

Sheet 1	1	2	3	4	5	6	7	8	Final
(Italy) Stefania Constantini 🔨	2	0	1	0	2	0	6	X	11
(Turkey) Dilşat Yıldız	0	1	0	2	0	1	0	X	4

Sheet 2	1	2	3	4	5	6	7	8	9	Final
(Sweden) Isabella Wranå 🔨	0	3	0	1	0	1	0	1	3	9
(Switzerland) Michèle Jäggi	0	0	2	0	3	0	1	0	0	6

Sheet 3	1	2	3	4	5	6	7	8	Final
(Switzerland) Raphaela Keiser	1	0	0	1	0	2	0	2	6
(Denmark) Madeleine Dupont 🔨	0	1	0	0	1	0	3	0	5

Sheet 4	1	2	3	4	5	6	7	8	Final
(Japan) Asuka Kanai	0	0	1	0	0	1	0	X	2
(Norway) Eirin Mesloe 🔨	2	2	0	1	2	0	1	X	8

Sheet 5	1	2	3	4	5	6	7	8	Final
(Latvia) Santa Blumberga-Bērziņa	0	2	0	0	2	0	3	0	7
(Scotland) Rebecca Morrison 🔨	2	0	0	2	0	3	0	1	8

== Playoffs ==
Quarterfinals
1	(Sweden) Isabella Wranå	1
8	(Switzerland) Michèle Jäggi	10
4	(Scotland) Rebecca Morrison	3
5	(Denmark) Madeleine Dupont	8
2	(Switzerland) Raphaela Keiser	5
7	(Italy) Stefania Constantini	3
3	(Switzerland) Xenia Schwaller	3
6	(Switzerland) Silvana Tirinzoni	4

Semifinals
8	(Switzerland) Michèle Jäggi	9
5	(Denmark) Madeleine Dupont	6
2	(Switzerland) Raphaela Keiser	4
6	(Switzerland) Silvana Tirinzoni	3

Final
8	(Switzerland) Michèle Jäggi	3
2	(Switzerland) Raphaela Keiser	9

=== Quarterfinals ===
Sunday, September 25, 8:00 am

Sheet 1	1	2	3	4	5	6	7	8	Final
(Sweden) Isabella Wranå 🔨	0	0	1	0	X	X	X	X	1
(Switzerland) Michèle Jäggi	1	4	0	5	X	X	X	X	10

Sheet 2	1	2	3	4	5	6	7	8	Final
(Scotland) Rebecca Morrison 🔨	1	0	1	0	1	0	0	X	3
(Denmark) Madeleine Dupont	0	3	0	1	0	3	1	X	8

Sheet 4	1	2	3	4	5	6	7	8	Final
(Switzerland) Xenia Schwaller 🔨	0	1	0	1	0	0	1	X	3
(Switzerland) Silvana Tirinzoni	1	0	1	0	1	1	0	X	4

Sheet 5	1	2	3	4	5	6	7	8	Final
(Switzerland) Raphaela Keiser 🔨	1	0	0	1	1	0	2	X	5
(Italy) Stefania Constantini	0	1	0	0	0	2	0	X	3

=== Semifinals ===
Sunday, September 25, 11:15 am

Sheet 2	1	2	3	4	5	6	7	8	Final
(Switzerland) Raphaela Keiser 🔨	0	2	0	0	0	1	0	1	4
(Switzerland) Silvana Tirinzoni	0	0	1	1	0	0	1	0	3

Sheet 4	1	2	3	4	5	6	7	8	Final
(Switzerland) Michèle Jäggi	0	3	0	2	1	1	0	2	9
(Denmark) Madeleine Dupont 🔨	1	0	2	0	0	0	3	0	6

=== Final ===
Sunday, September 25, 2:30 pm

Sheet 3	1	2	3	4	5	6	7	8	Final
(Switzerland) Michèle Jäggi	0	1	0	1	0	1	0	X	3
(Switzerland) Raphaela Keiser 🔨	2	0	3	0	2	0	2	X	9
