= Curling at the 2018 Winter Olympics – Qualification event =

Curling at the 2018 Winter Olympics Qualification event
- Host city: Plzeň, Czech Republic
- Arena: Winter Arena Košutka
- Dates: December 5–10, 2017
- Men's winner: Italy
- Curling club: A.S.D. Trentino Curling, Cembra
- Skip: Joël Retornaz
- Fourth: Amos Mosaner
- Second: Simone Gonin
- Lead: Daniele Ferrazza
- Alternate: Andrea Pilzer
- Finalist: Denmark (Rasmus Stjerne)
- Women's winner: China
- Curling club: Harbin CC, Harbin
- Skip: Wang Bingyu
- Third: Zhou Yan
- Second: Liu Jinli
- Lead: Ma Jingyi
- Finalist: Denmark (Madeleine Dupont)

The Olympic qualifying event was held from 5–10 December 2017 in Plzeň, Czech Republic. The qualification event was open to any nations that earned qualification points at the 2016 or 2017 World Curling Championships or participated at the 2014 or 2015 World Curling Championships (the Czech men's team, the Norway & the Latvia women's team). The top two teams from the qualification event qualified their nations to participate in the Olympics.

== Competition format ==
In both the men's and the women's tournaments, the teams played a single round robin, and at its conclusion, the top three teams advanced to the playoffs. In the playoffs, the first and second seeds played a game to determine the first team to advance to the main Olympic tournament. The loser of this game, along with the third seed, played a game to determine the second team to advance to the main Olympic tournament.

== Men ==
=== Teams ===
China	Czech Republic	Denmark	Finland
Skip: Liu Rui; Third: Xu Xiaoming; Second: Jiang Dongxu; Lead: Zang Jialiang; Alternate: Ma Yanlong	Skip: Jiří Snítil; Third: Lukáš Klíma; Second: Martin Snítil; Lead: Jindřich Kitzberger; Alternate: Samuel Mokriš	Skip: Rasmus Stjerne; Third: Johnny Frederiksen; Second: Mikkel Poulsen; Lead: Oliver Dupont; Alternate: Morten Berg Thomsen	Skip: Aku Kauste; Third: Kasper Hakunti; Second: Pauli Jäämies; Lead: Janne Pitko; Alternate: Kalle Kiiskinen
Germany	Italy	Netherlands	Olympic Athletes from Russia
Skip: Alexander Baumann; Third: Manuel Walter; Second: Daniel Herberg; Lead: Ryan Sherrard; Alternate: Sebastian Schweizer	Skip: Joël Retornaz; Fourth: Amos Mosaner; Second: Simone Gonin; Lead: Daniele Ferrazza; Alternate: Andrea Pilzer	Skip: Jaap van Dorp; Third: Wouter Gösgens; Second: Laurens Hoekman; Lead: Carlo Glasbergen; Alternate: Alexander Magan	Skip: Alexey Timofeev; Third: Artem Shmakov; Second: Artur Razhabov; Lead: Evgeny Klimov; Alternate: Sergey Glukhov

=== Round-robin standings ===
Final round-robin standings

Key
Teams to Playoffs

Country	Skip	W	L
Denmark	Rasmus Stjerne	6	1
Italy	Joël Retornaz	4	3
Czech Republic	Jiří Snítil	4	3
Olympic Athletes from Russia	Alexey Timofeev	4	3
China	Liu Rui	4	3
Finland	Aku Kauste	3	4
Germany	Alexander Baumann	2	5
Netherlands	Jaap van Dorp	1	6

=== Round-robin results ===
All draw times are listed in Central European Time (UTC+1).

==== Draw 1 ====
Tuesday, December 5, 20:00

Sheet A	1	2	3	4	5	6	7	8	9	10	Final
Denmark (Stjerne)	0	0	1	0	0	1	0	1	0	X	3
Olympic Athletes from Russia (Timofeev)	0	0	0	1	0	0	2	0	3	X	6

Sheet B	1	2	3	4	5	6	7	8	9	10	Final
Czech Republic (Snítil)	0	0	0	0	1	1	0	1	0	2	5
Finland (Kauste)	0	0	0	0	0	0	1	0	2	0	3

Sheet C	1	2	3	4	5	6	7	8	9	10	Final
Germany (Baumann)	0	0	2	0	0	1	0	0	1	X	4
China (Liu)	1	2	0	3	0	0	0	1	0	X	7

Sheet D	1	2	3	4	5	6	7	8	9	10	Final
Netherlands (van Dorp)	1	1	0	1	0	2	0	1	0	0	6
Italy (Retornaz)	0	0	2	0	1	0	2	0	0	2	7

==== Draw 2 ====
Wednesday, December 6, 12:00

Sheet A	1	2	3	4	5	6	7	8	9	10	Final
Italy (Retornaz)	0	2	0	0	2	0	1	0	X	X	5
China (Liu)	0	0	3	3	0	3	0	1	X	X	10

Sheet B	1	2	3	4	5	6	7	8	9	10	Final
Netherlands (van Dorp)	0	0	0	0	1	0	0	1	1	0	3
Germany (Baumann)	1	1	0	0	0	1	0	0	0	1	4

Sheet C	1	2	3	4	5	6	7	8	9	10	Final
Denmark (Stjerne)	2	0	1	1	0	4	0	2	X	X	10
Czech Republic (Snítil)	0	2	0	0	1	0	1	0	X	X	4

Sheet D	1	2	3	4	5	6	7	8	9	10	Final
Olympic Athletes from Russia (Timofeev)	2	0	1	0	2	0	0	1	0	0	6
Finland (Kauste)	0	2	0	2	0	3	0	0	2	0	9

==== Draw 3 ====
Wednesday, December 6, 20:00

Sheet A	1	2	3	4	5	6	7	8	9	10	Final
Netherlands (van Dorp)	0	2	0	2	1	1	0	1	1	X	8
Finland (Kauste)	2	0	1	0	0	0	1	0	0	X	4

Sheet B	1	2	3	4	5	6	7	8	9	10	Final
Denmark (Stjerne)	0	1	1	0	0	1	0	1	1	X	5
China (Liu)	1	0	0	0	2	0	0	0	0	X	3

Sheet C	1	2	3	4	5	6	7	8	9	10	Final
Olympic Athletes from Russia (Timofeev)	1	0	1	1	1	0	0	1	0	0	5
Italy (Retornaz)	0	1	0	0	0	0	3	0	0	2	6

Sheet D	1	2	3	4	5	6	7	8	9	10	Final
Germany (Baumann)	0	1	0	2	1	2	0	0	2	X	8
Czech Republic (Snítil)	2	0	1	0	0	0	1	0	0	X	4

==== Draw 4 ====
Thursday, December 7, 14:00

Sheet A	1	2	3	4	5	6	7	8	9	10	Final
Olympic Athletes from Russia (Timofeev)	0	0	1	1	1	0	1	0	1	0	5
Czech Republic (Snítil)	2	2	0	0	0	0	0	2	0	1	7

Sheet B	1	2	3	4	5	6	7	8	9	10	Final
China (Liu)	3	0	0	0	1	0	0	2	0	1	7
Netherlands (van Dorp)	0	1	0	1	0	1	1	0	1	0	5

Sheet C	1	2	3	4	5	6	7	8	9	10	11	Final
Italy (Retornaz)	1	0	0	1	0	1	0	0	0	1	2	6
Germany (Baumann)	0	3	0	0	0	0	1	0	0	0	0	4

Sheet D	1	2	3	4	5	6	7	8	9	10	Final
Finland (Kauste)	0	1	0	1	0	3	1	0	3	0	9
Denmark (Stjerne)	3	0	3	0	1	0	0	1	0	2	10

==== Draw 5 ====
Friday, December 8, 9:00

Sheet A	1	2	3	4	5	6	7	8	9	10	Final
Germany (Baumann)	0	0	0	0	0	0	1	0	X	X	1
Denmark (Stjerne)	0	0	1	1	1	2	0	1	X	X	6

Sheet B	1	2	3	4	5	6	7	8	9	10	Final
Finland (Kauste)	1	0	0	2	1	0	1	1	1	X	7
Italy (Retornaz)	0	1	1	0	0	1	0	0	0	X	3

Sheet C	1	2	3	4	5	6	7	8	9	10	Final
Netherlands (van Dorp)	1	0	0	3	0	1	0	1	0	0	6
Olympic Athletes from Russia (Timofeev)	0	1	3	0	0	0	1	0	3	1	9

Sheet D	1	2	3	4	5	6	7	8	9	10	Final
Czech Republic (Snítil)	0	4	0	2	0	1	0	3	0	X	10
China (Liu)	1	0	1	0	2	0	2	0	1	X	7

==== Draw 6 ====
Friday, December 8, 19:00

Sheet A	1	2	3	4	5	6	7	8	9	10	Final
Czech Republic (Snítil)	0	2	0	2	0	0	2	0	0	X	6
Italy (Retornaz)	1	0	3	0	0	1	0	3	2	X	10

Sheet B	1	2	3	4	5	6	7	8	9	10	Final
Germany (Baumann)	0	0	2	0	1	0	0	0	2	X	5
Olympic Athletes from Russia (Timofeev)	0	2	0	0	0	1	0	3	0	X	6

Sheet C	1	2	3	4	5	6	7	8	9	10	Final
China (Liu)	0	2	2	0	1	2	0	0	1	2	10
Finland (Kauste)	2	0	0	1	0	0	2	1	0	0	6

Sheet D	1	2	3	4	5	6	7	8	9	10	Final
Denmark (Stjerne)	2	0	2	0	0	1	0	1	1	X	7
Netherlands (van Dorp)	0	2	0	0	1	0	0	0	0	X	3

==== Draw 7 ====
Saturday, December 9, 13:00

Sheet A	1	2	3	4	5	6	7	8	9	10	Final
Finland (Kauste)	2	0	1	1	0	0	1	2	1	X	8
Germany (Baumann)	0	1	0	0	1	2	0	0	0	X	4

Sheet B	1	2	3	4	5	6	7	8	9	10	Final
Italy (Retornaz)	0	0	0	1	0	0	2	0	X	X	3
Denmark (Stjerne)	0	0	3	0	1	0	0	4	X	X	8

Sheet C	1	2	3	4	5	6	7	8	9	10	Final
Czech Republic (Snítil)	2	0	0	0	2	0	3	0	1	X	8
Netherlands (van Dorp)	0	1	0	1	0	1	0	1	0	X	4

Sheet D	1	2	3	4	5	6	7	8	9	10	Final
China (Liu)	0	1	1	0	1	0	0	2	0	X	5
Olympic Athletes from Russia (Timofeev)	1	0	0	1	0	1	2	0	3	X	8

=== Playoffs ===
Second qualifier			First qualifier
			1	Denmark	5
1	Denmark	4	2	Italy	6
3	Czech Republic	2

==== First qualifier ====
Sunday, December 10, 8:00

Sheet B	1	2	3	4	5	6	7	8	9	10	11	Final
Denmark (Stjerne)	1	0	2	0	0	0	1	0	0	1	0	5
Italy (Retornaz)	0	1	0	2	0	0	0	0	2	0	1	6

Player percentages
Denmark		Italy	
Oliver Dupont	81%	Daniele Ferrazza	73%
Mikkel Poulsen	86%	Simone Gonin	83%
Johnny Frederiksen	84%	Joël Retornaz	84%
Rasmus Stjerne	77%	Amos Mosaner	72%
Total	82%	Total	78%

==== Second qualifier ====
Sunday, December 10, 16:00

Sheet B	1	2	3	4	5	6	7	8	9	10	Final
Denmark (Stjerne)	0	0	1	0	2	0	0	0	0	1	4
Czech Republic (Snítil)	0	0	0	1	0	0	0	1	0	0	2

Player percentages
Denmark		Czech Republic	
Oliver Dupont	79%	Jindřich Kitzberger	93%
Mikkel Poulsen	91%	Martin Snítil	84%
Johnny Frederiksen	85%	Lukáš Klíma	86%
Rasmus Stjerne	88%	Jiří Snítil	83%
Total	86%	Total	87%

== Women ==
=== Teams ===
China	Czech Republic	Denmark	Finland
Skip: Wang Bingyu; Third: Zhou Yan; Second: Liu Jinli; Lead: Ma Jingyi	Skip: Anna Kubešková; Third: Alžběta Baudyšová; Second: Tereza Plíšková; Lead: Klára Svatoňová; Alternate: Ežen Kolčevská	Skip: Madeleine Dupont; Third: Denise Dupont; Second: Julie Høgh; Lead: Mathilde Halse; Alternate: Lina Knudsen	Skip: Oona Kauste; Third: Eszter Juhász; Second: Maija Salmiovirta; Lead: Jenni Räsänen; Alternate: Lotta Immonen
Germany	Italy	Latvia	
Skip: Daniela Jentsch; Third: Josephine Obermann; Second: Analena Jentsch; Lead: Pia-Lisa Schöll; Alternate: Emira Abbes	Skip: Diana Gaspari; Third: Veronica Zappone; Second: Stefania Constantini; Lead: Angela Romei; Alternate: Chiara Olivieri	Skip: Iveta Staša-Šaršūne; Third: Ieva Krusta; Second: Santa Blumberga; Lead: Evelīna Barone; Alternate: Madara Bremane	

=== Round-robin standings ===
Final round-robin standings

Key
Teams to Playoffs

Country	Skip	W	L
Italy	Diana Gaspari	5	1
China	Wang Bingyu	5	1
Denmark	Madeleine Dupont	4	2
Czech Republic	Anna Kubešková	3	3
Latvia	Iveta Staša-Šaršūne	2	4
Germany	Daniela Jentsch	2	4
Finland	Oona Kauste	0	6

=== Round-robin results ===
All draw times are listed in Central European Time (UTC+1).

==== Draw 1 ====
Tuesday, December 5, 15:00

Sheet A	1	2	3	4	5	6	7	8	9	10	Final
Latvia (Staša-Šaršūne)	2	0	0	3	1	0	1	0	1	2	10
Germany (Jentsch)	0	0	2	0	0	1	0	2	0	0	5

Sheet C	1	2	3	4	5	6	7	8	9	10	Final
Denmark (Dupont)	0	1	0	2	0	1	0	2	1	X	7
Italy (Gaspari)	1	0	1	0	1	0	1	0	0	X	4

Sheet D	1	2	3	4	5	6	7	8	9	10	11	Final
Czech Republic (Kubešková)	1	0	1	2	1	0	1	0	0	0	0	6
China (Wang)	0	1	0	0	0	1	0	1	1	2	1	7

==== Draw 2 ====
Wednesday, December 6, 8:00

Sheet B	1	2	3	4	5	6	7	8	9	10	Final
Czech Republic (Kubešková)	2	0	2	0	2	0	2	0	1	X	9
Latvia (Staša-Šaršūne)	0	1	0	1	0	1	0	2	0	X	5

Sheet C	1	2	3	4	5	6	7	8	9	10	Final
Finland (Kauste)	0	0	0	0	0	0	X	X	X	X	0
China (Wang)	2	2	1	2	1	1	X	X	X	X	9

Sheet D	1	2	3	4	5	6	7	8	9	10	Final
Germany (Jentsch)	0	1	0	3	1	0	2	0	0	0	7
Denmark (Dupont)	0	0	2	0	0	1	0	3	1	2	9

==== Draw 3 ====
Wednesday, December 6, 16:00

Sheet A	1	2	3	4	5	6	7	8	9	10	Final
Germany (Jentsch)	2	0	1	0	2	0	2	0	0	3	10
Czech Republic (Kubešková)	0	3	0	1	0	1	0	1	1	0	7

Sheet B	1	2	3	4	5	6	7	8	9	10	Final
Italy (Gaspari)	0	2	0	1	2	1	0	1	0	X	7
Finland (Kauste)	0	0	1	0	0	0	2	0	1	X	4

Sheet C	1	2	3	4	5	6	7	8	9	10	Final
China (Wang)	1	0	3	1	0	3	0	2	1	X	11
Latvia (Staša-Šaršūne)	0	2	0	0	2	0	1	0	0	X	5

==== Draw 4 ====
Thursday, December 7, 9:00

Sheet A	1	2	3	4	5	6	7	8	9	10	Final
China (Wang)	0	1	0	3	0	0	1	0	0	0	5
Italy (Gaspari)	0	0	1	0	0	1	0	3	1	2	8

Sheet B	1	2	3	4	5	6	7	8	9	10	Final
Denmark (Dupont)	0	2	1	0	2	0	0	0	0	X	5
Czech Republic (Kubešková)	2	0	0	2	0	0	2	2	1	X	9

Sheet D	1	2	3	4	5	6	7	8	9	10	Final
Latvia (Staša-Šaršūne)	2	0	0	2	3	0	2	0	1	X	10
Finland (Kauste)	0	1	1	0	0	1	0	2	0	X	5

==== Draw 5 ====
Thursday, December 7, 19:00

Sheet A	1	2	3	4	5	6	7	8	9	10	Final
Czech Republic (Kubešková)	0	2	0	3	1	0	2	0	3	X	11
Finland (Kauste)	2	0	1	0	0	1	0	1	0	X	5

Sheet B	1	2	3	4	5	6	7	8	9	10	11	Final
Germany (Jentsch)	0	0	3	0	0	2	0	4	0	0	0	9
Italy (Gaspari)	2	1	0	0	2	0	1	0	2	1	1	10

Sheet C	1	2	3	4	5	6	7	8	9	10	11	Final
Latvia (Staša-Šaršūne)	2	0	1	0	1	1	0	3	0	1	0	9
Denmark (Dupont)	0	2	0	2	0	0	3	0	2	0	1	10

==== Draw 6 ====
Friday, December 8, 14:00

Sheet A	1	2	3	4	5	6	7	8	9	10	Final
Denmark (Dupont)	0	1	1	0	0	1	0	0	X	X	3
China (Wang)	2	0	0	1	2	0	0	4	X	X	9

Sheet C	1	2	3	4	5	6	7	8	9	10	Final
Italy (Gaspari)	1	0	0	0	0	3	0	2	0	3	9
Czech Republic (Kubešková)	0	2	0	0	1	0	2	0	2	0	7

Sheet D	1	2	3	4	5	6	7	8	9	10	Final
Finland (Kauste)	1	0	0	1	0	1	0	0	1	0	4
Germany (Jentsch)	0	3	0	0	1	0	1	0	0	1	6

==== Draw 7 ====
Saturday, December 9, 9:00

Sheet A	1	2	3	4	5	6	7	8	9	10	Final
Finland (Kauste)	0	0	0	1	0	2	0	0	X	X	3
Denmark (Dupont)	1	1	1	0	3	0	1	2	X	X	9

Sheet B	1	2	3	4	5	6	7	8	9	10	Final
China (Wang)	0	1	0	2	2	0	2	0	X	X	7
Germany (Jentsch)	0	0	1	0	0	1	0	1	X	X	3

Sheet D	1	2	3	4	5	6	7	8	9	10	11	Final
Italy (Gaspari)	0	0	1	1	0	1	0	2	1	0	1	7
Latvia (Staša-Šaršūne)	0	1	0	0	1	0	3	0	0	1	0	6

=== Playoffs ===
Second qualifier			First qualifier
			1	Italy	4
1	Italy	4	2	China	11
3	Denmark	5

==== First qualifier ====
Saturday, December 9, 19:00

Sheet B	1	2	3	4	5	6	7	8	9	10	Final
Italy (Gaspari)	3	0	0	0	1	0	0	0	X	X	4
China (Wang)	0	1	3	4	0	1	1	1	X	X	11

Player percentages
Italy		China	
Angela Romei	70%	Ma Jingyi	89%
Stefania Constantini	73%	Liu Jinli	67%
Veronica Zappone	80%	Zhou Yan	83%
Diana Gaspari	61%	Wang Bingyu	78%
Total	71%	Total	79%

==== Second qualifier ====
Sunday, December 10, 12:00

Sheet B	1	2	3	4	5	6	7	8	9	10	11	Final
Italy (Gaspari)	0	0	1	1	0	0	1	0	0	1	0	4
Denmark (Dupont)	0	0	0	0	0	1	0	2	1	0	1	5

Player percentages
Italy		Denmark	
Angela Romei	73%	Mathilde Halse	69%
Stefania Constantini	84%	Julie Høgh	60%
Veronica Zappone	81%	Denise Dupont	65%
Diana Gaspari	61%	Madeleine Dupont	75%
Total	75%	Total	67%
