= Tīna Siliņa =

Latvian curler (born 1995)

- Curler
- Born: 10 January 1995 (age 31); Ventspils, Latvia

Team
- Curling club: Jelgavas kērlinga klubs, Jelgava
- Skip: Santa Blumberga-Bērziņa
- Fourth: Ieva Rudzīte
- Second: Katrīna Gaidule
- Lead: Tīna Siliņa
- Alternate: Betija Gulbe

Curling career
- Member Association: Latvia
- World Championship: 1 (2019)
- European Championship: 3 (2018, 2019, 2022)
- Other appearances: World Junior-B Championships: 1 (2016), European Junior Challenge: 2 (2013, 2015)

Tīna Siliņa (born 10 January 1995 in Ventspils) is a Latvian curler from Jelgava. She is currently the alternate for the Latvian National Women's Curling Team.

== Career ==
At the national level, she is a three-time Latvian junior champion (2012, 2015, 2016). Siliņa competed in her first European Curling Championships in 2018 at the 2018 European Curling Championships. The team had an impressive performance, finishing with a 4–5 record in the A Division including defeating higher-ranked Scotland's Eve Muirhead. This qualified them for the 2019 World Women's Curling Championship. There, the team struggled, finishing in last place with a 1–11 record.

== Teams ==
Season	Skip	Third	Second	Lead	Alternate	Coach	Events
2011–12	Santa Blumberga (fourth)	Tina Siliņa (skip)	Katrīna Bindere	Una Ozoliņa	Agita Puriņa		LJCC 2012 (gold)
2012–13	Elizabete Laiviņa (fourth)	Una Kristiana Ozoliņa (skip)	Tina Siliņa	Santa Blumberga	Laura Gaidule	Arnis Veidemanis	EJCC 2013 (11th)
2012–13	Santa Blumberga (fourth)	Una Ozoliņa (skip)	Tina Siliņa	Katrīna Bindere	Kristīne Bulačņikova	Inga Apmane	LJCC 2013 (silver)
2013–14	Kristīne Bulačņikova (fourth)	Tina Siliņa	Una Ozoliņa	Santa Blumberga (skip)	Anna Marija Šefanovska	Dace Ābelīte	LJCC 2014 (silver)
2014–15	Santa Blumberga	Madara Bremane	Helma Gerda Bidiņa	Evelīna Barone	Tina Siliņa	Iveta Staša-Šaršūne	EJCC 2015 (5th)
2014–15	Evelīna Barone	Helma Gerda Bidiņa	Madara Bremane	Santa Blumberga	Tina Siliņa		LJCC 2015 (gold)
2014–15	Madara Bremane	Helma Gerda Bidiņa	Tina Siliņa	Evelīna Barone		Andris Bremanis	LWCC 2015 (7th)
2015–16	Santa Blumberga	Madara Bremane	Helma Gerda Bidiņa	Evelīna Barone	Tina Siliņa		
2015–16	Tina Siliņa	Evelīna Barone	Helma Gerda Bidiņa	Madara Bremane	Megija Anna Graumane	Santa Blumberga	LJCC 2016 (gold)
2018–19	Iveta Staša-Šaršūne	Ieva Krusta (ECC); Santa Blumberga (WCC)	Santa Blumberga (ECC); Ieva Krusta (WCC)	Evelīna Barone	Tina Siliņa	Kārlis Smilga (ECC, WCC); Ritvars Gulbis (ECC); Roberts Krusts (WCC)	ECC 2018 (5th); WCC 2019 (13th)
2019–20	Iveta Staša-Šaršūne	Santa Blumberga	Ieva Krusta	Evelīna Barone	Tina Siliņa	Ritvars Gulbis	ECC 2019 (10th)
