= Iluta Linde =

Latvian female curler

- Curler ♀
- Born: 14 January 1972 (age 54); Riga, Latvia

Team
- Curling club: Jelgavas Kērlinga klubs, Jelgava

Curling career
- Member Association: Latvia
- World Championship: 1 (2014)
- World Mixed Doubles Championship: 1 (2015)
- European Championship: 1 (2013)
- Other appearances: European Mixed Championship: 2 (2013, 2014)
Medal record
Curling
Latvian Women's Championship
Bronze medal – third place	2009
Bronze medal – third place	2011
Bronze medal – third place	2012
Bronze medal – third place	2014
Bronze medal – third place	2015
Bronze medal – third place	2016
Bronze medal – third place	2018

Iluta Linde (born 14 January 1972 in Riga) is a Latvian female curler.

At the national level, she is a two-time Latvian mixed champion (2013, 2014) and a 2014 mixed doubles champion.

== Teams ==
=== Women's ===
Season	Skip	Third	Second	Lead	Alternate	Coach	Events
2006–07	Kitija Zaķe	Līga Caune	Maija Prozoroviča	Vineta Smilga	Iluta Linde, Ieva Palma		LWCC 2007 (5th)
2007–08	Elēna Kāpostiņa	Rasa Lubarte	Iluta Linde	Līga Caune	Ieva Cielava	Gints Caune	LWCC 2008 (8th)
2008–09	Elēna Kāpostiņa	Rasa Lubarte	Iluta Linde	Līga Caune		Gints Caune	LWCC 2009 (bronze)
2009–10	Iluta Linde	Līga Caune	Kitija Zaķe	Maija Prozoroviča			LWCC 2010 (4th)
2010–11	Iluta Linde	Līga Caune	Kitija Zaķe	Maija Prozoroviča			LWCC 2011 (bronze)
2011–12	Iluta Linde	Līga Caune	Kitija Zaķe	Maija Prozoroviča			LWCC 2012 (bronze)
2012–13	Iluta Linde	Līga Caune	Sanita Saulgrieze	Maija Prozoroviča		Gints Caune	LWCC 2013 (4th)
2013–14	Evita Regža	Dace Regža	Ieva Bērziņa	Žaklīna Litauniece	Iluta Linde	Ansis Regža	ECC 2013 (7th); WCC 2014 (12th)
2013–14	Iluta Linde	Līga Caune	Sanita Saulgrieze	Maija Prozoroviča	Rasa Lubarte	Gints Caune	LWCC 2014 (bronze)
2014–15	Iluta Linde	Ieva Bērziņa	Una Ģērmane	Žaklīna Litauniece	Ieva Krusta	Arnis Veidemanis	LWCC 2015 (bronze)
2015–16	Santa Blumberga (fourth)	Iluta Linde (skip)	Ieva Bērziņa	Una Ģērmane	Evija Dompalma-Linuža		LWCC 2016 (bronze)
2017–18	Elēna Kāpostiņa	Dace Zīle	Iluta Linde	Maija Prozoroviča	Dace Spilnere-Pūciņa	Pēteris Šveisbergs	LWCC 2018 (bronze)
2018–19	Maija Prozoroviča (fourth)	Dace Spilnere-Pūciņa	Dace Zīle	Elēna Kāpostiņa (skip)	Iluta Linde		LWCC 2019 (5th)

=== Mixed ===
Season	Skip	Third	Second	Lead	Alternate	Coach	Events
2006–07	Iluta Linde	Līga Caune	Gints Caune	Silards Stakans	Elēna Kāpostiņa		LMxCC 2007 (6th)
2007–08	Gints Caune	Līga Caune	Normunds Kalniņš	Iluta Linde	Silards Stakans		LMxCC 2008 (7th)
2008–09	Silards Stakans	Gints Caune	Iluta Linde	Līga Caune			LMxCC 2009 (4th)
2010–11	Gints Caune	Līga Caune	Jānis Puls	Iluta Linde			LMxCC 2011 (5th)
2011–12	Iluta Linde (fourth)	Gints Caune (skip)	Līga Caune	Valdis Ancāns			LMxCC 2012 (8th)
2012–13	Arnis Veidemanis	Iluta Linde	Rihards Jeske	Sabīne Jeske			LMxCC 2013 (gold)
2013–14	Arnis Veidemanis	Iluta Linde	Rihards Jeske	Sabīne Jeske		John Summers	EMxCC 2013 (14th)
2013–14	Kārlis Smilga	Iluta Linde	Arnis Veidemanis	Vineta Smilga			LMxCC 2014 (gold)
2014–15	Kārlis Smilga	Iluta Linde	Arnis Veidemanis	Vineta Smilga		Raimonds Vaivods	EMxCC 2014 (23rd)
2014–15	Kārlis Smilga	Iluta Linde	Arnis Veidemanis	Santa Blumberga			LMxCC 2015 (silver)

=== Mixed doubles ===
Season	Female	Male	Events
2012–13	Iluta Linde	Arnis Veidemanis	LMDCC 2012 (bronze)
2013–14	Iluta Linde	Arnis Veidemanis	LMDCC 2013 (silver)
2014–15	Iluta Linde	Arnis Veidemanis	LMDCC 2014 (gold); WMDCC 2015 (12th)
2015–16	Iluta Linde	Arnis Veidemanis	LMDCC 2015 (silver)
2016–17	Iluta Linde	Arnis Veidemanis	LMDCC 2016 (silver)
2017–18	Iluta Linde	Arnis Veidemanis	LMDCC 2017 (silver)
2018–19	Iluta Linde	Arnis Veidemanis	LMDCC 2018 (silver)
