= Žaklīna Litauniece =

Latvian curler and sailor (born 1968)

- Curler ♀
- Born: 20 November 1968 (age 57); Rēzekne, Latvia

Team
- Curling club: Latvijas kērlinga klubs, Riga

Curling career
- Member Association: Latvia
- World Championship: 1 (2014)
- European Championship: 1 (2013)
- Other appearances: European Mixed Championship: 1 (2010)
Medal record
Curling
Latvian Women's Championship
Gold medal – first place	2013
Gold medal – first place	2014
Silver medal – second place	2012
Bronze medal – third place	2015

Žaklina Litauniece (born 20 November 1968 in Rēzekne) is a Latvian female curler and yachtswoman.

As a curler, at the national level, she is a two-time Latvian women's champion (2013, 2014).

As a sailor, she competed at the 2000 Summer Olympics in the "Europe" class (women's one person dinghy) races, finished in 27th place.

== Teams ==
=== Women's ===
Season	Skip	Third	Second	Lead	Alternate	Coach	Events
2011–12	Evita Regža	Dace Regža	Ieva Bērziņa	Žaklina Litaunīece			LWCC 2012 (silver)
2012–13	Evita Regža	Dace Regža	Ieva Bērziņa	Žaklina Litaunīece		Ansis Regža	LWCC 2013 (gold)
2013–14	Evita Regža	Dace Regža	Ieva Bērziņa	Žaklina Litaunīece	Anete Zābere (LWCC); Iluta Linde (ECC, WCC)	Ansis Regža	ECC 2013 (7th); LWCC 2014 (gold); WCC 2014 (12th)
2014–15	Iluta Linde	Ieva Bērziņa	Una Ģērmane	Žaklina Litaunīece	Ieva Krusta	Arnis Veidemanis	LWCC 2015 (bronze)

=== Mixed ===
Season	Skip	Third	Second	Lead	Alternate	Events
2010–11	Raivis Bušmanis	Una Ģērmane	Ainārs Gulbis	Žaklina Litaunīece	Dace Munča	LMxCC 2011 (4th)
2011–12	Pēteris Šveisbergs	Ieva Bērziņa	Ivars Černajs	Žaklina Litaunīece	Anete Zābere	LMxCC 2012 (4th)
2012–13	Ainārs Gulbis	Una Ģērmane	Raivis Bušmanis	Žaklina Litaunīece		LMxCC 2013 (4th)
