= Latvian Men's Curling Championship =

Annual winter sports event in Latvia

The Latvian Men's Curling Championship (Latvian: Latvijas kērlinga čempionāts vīriešiem) is the national championship of men's curling in Latvia. It has been held annually since 2002. It is organized by the Latvian Curling Association (Latvian: Latvijas Kērlinga Asociācija).

== List of champions ==
(Team line-up in order: skip (marked bold), third, second, lead, alternate(s), coach)

Year	Champions team	Runner-up	Bronze
2002	Ledlauži; Roberts Augstkalns, Ivars Paegle, Aivars Kuzņecovs, Jānis Rudzītis, alternate: Ilgonis Zīds	Sudrabakmens; Uldis Gaiss, Andris Misters, Pēteris Šveisbergs, Juris Bogdanovs, alternate: Rodijs Trankalis	Jelgavas Maiznieks; Roberts Krusts, Artis Zentelis, Jānis Laizāns, Kārlis Smilga, alternate: Visvaldis Danenbergs
2003	Ondulat - 2 Gatis Šķila, Ansis Regža, Uldis Vrubļevskis, Jānis Bāliņš	Jelgavas Maiznieks; Roberts Krusts, Artis Zentelis, Jānis Laizāns, Kārlis Smilga, alternate: Jānis Klīve	Bolder; Roberts Augstkalns, Ivars Paegle, Aivars Kuzņecovs, Jānis Rudzītis, alternates: Valdis Pumpurs, Māris Rudens
2004	Jelgavas Maiznieks; Roberts Krusts, Artis Zentelis, Jānis Laizāns, Kārlis Smilga, alternate: Jānis Klīve	Rīgas Roņi; Ilgonis Zīds, Aivars Avotiņš, Ritvars Gulbis, Ainārs Gulbis, alternate: Mārtiņš Smelters	Pingvīni; Aivars Berners, Dzintars Bērziņš, Aigars Beizaks, Aivars Gulbis, alternate: Aivars Gavars
2005	Rīgas Roņi; Normunds Šaršūns, Aivars Avotiņš, Ritvars Gulbis, Ainārs Gulbis, alternates: Ainārs Ālups, Ilgonis Zīds, coach: Brian Gray	Jelgavas Maiznieks; Roberts Krusts, Artis Zentelis, Jānis Laizāns, Kārlis Smilga, alternate: Jānis Klīve	Ondulat; Gints Caune, Valdis Ancāns, Silards Stakans, Jānis Ratnieks, alternate: Normunds Kalniņš
2006	Jelgavas Maiznieks; Roberts Krusts, Artis Zentelis, Jānis Laizāns, Kārlis Smilga, alternate: Jānis Klīve	Ondulat / Ādažu apsardze Gints Caune, Valdis Ancāns, Silards Stakans, Jānis Ratnieks, alternate: Aivars Gulbis	Rīgas Roņi; Normunds Šaršūns, Aivars Avotiņš, Ritvars Gulbis, Ainārs Gulbis, coach: Brian Gray
2007	Rīgas Roņi; Normunds Šaršūns, Aivars Avotiņš, Ritvars Gulbis, Ainārs Gulbis, alternate: Ainārs Ālups, coach: Brian Gray	Junkers; Roberts Krusts, Artis Zentelis, Jānis Laizāns, Kārlis Smilga, alternate: Jānis Klīve	Ādažu apsardze Normunds Kalniņš, Gints Caune, Valdis Ancāns, Silards Stakans
2008	Rīgas Roņi; Normunds Šaršūns, Aivars Avotiņš, Ritvars Gulbis, Ainārs Gulbis, coach: Brian Gray	Ondulat B Renārs Freidensons, Edgars Mucenieks, Aivars Gavars, Ansis Regža	Junkers; Roberts Krusts, Artis Zentelis, Jānis Laizāns, Kārlis Smilga, alternate: Jānis Klīve
2009	Rīgas Roņi; Normunds Šaršūns, Aivars Avotiņš, Ritvars Gulbis, Ainārs Gulbis, coach: Brian Gray	Junkers; Roberts Krusts, Artis Zentelis, Jānis Laizāns, Kārlis Smilga, alternate: Jānis Klīve	Ondulat B Edgars Mucenieks, Aivars Gavars, Ansis Regža, Aivars Purmalis, alternate: Renārs Freidensons
2010	Rīgas Roņi; Ritvars Gulbis, Ainārs Gulbis, Normunds Šaršūns, Aivars Avotiņš, coach: Brian Gray	Ondulat B Ansis Regža, Renārs Freidensons, Edgars Mucenieks, Aivars Purmalis, alternate: Aivars Gavars	Junkers; Kārlis Smilga, Artis Zentelis, Roberts Krusts, Jānis Laizāns
2011	Rīgas Roņi; Ritvars Gulbis, Ainārs Gulbis, Normunds Šaršūns, Aivars Avotiņš	Ondulat B Aivars Purmalis, Ansis Regža, Renārs Freidensons, Edgars Mucenieks	Junkers; Kārlis Smilga, Artis Zentelis, Jānis Klīve, Jānis Laizāns, alternate: Roberts Krusts
2012	Klubs "A41" / Gulbis; Ritvars Gulbis, Ainārs Gulbis, Normunds Šaršūns, Aivars Avotiņš	Sporta Klubs OB/Regža; Aldis Abrickis, Ansis Regža, Arnis Veidemanis, Jānis Puls, alternate: Einārs Vilcāns	Jelgavas Kērlinga Klubs/ Bušmanis; Raivis Bušmanis, Artūrs Volkovičs, Edgars Mucenieks, Arvis Bušmanis
2013	Klubs "A41" / Gulbis; Ritvars Gulbis, Normunds Šaršūns, Roberts Krusts, Aivars Avotiņš	Junkers Bosch / Smilga; Kārlis Smilga, Jānis Klīve, Artis Zentelis, Jānis Laizāns	Sporta Klubs OB/Regža; Ansis Regža, Ainārs Gulbis, Gints Caune, Aivars Purmalis
2014	Klubs "A41" / Gulbis; Ritvars Gulbis, Normunds Šaršūns, Aivars Avotiņš, Artūrs Gerhards, alternate: Roberts Krusts	Jelgavas Kērlinga Klubs / Gray; Ainārs Gulbis, Raivis Bušmanis, Artūrs Volkovičs, Brian Gray, alternate: Arvis Bušmanis	Jelgavas Kērlinga Klubs / Šveisbergs; Pēteris Šveisbergs, Ivars Černajs, Jānis Rēdlihs, Aivars Gulbis
2015	Klubs "A41" / Gulbis; Ritvars Gulbis, Normunds Šaršūns, Aivars Avotiņš, Artūrs Gerhards, alternate: Roberts Krusts	Talsu Kērlinga Klubs / Veidemanis; Arnis Veidemanis, Aldis Abrickis, Andris Bremanis Jun, Raimonds Vaivods, alternate: Renārs Freidensons	Kērlinga klubs "Rīga" / Trukšāns; Mārtiņš Trukšāns, Sandris Buholcs, Rihards Jeske, Didzis Pētersons, alternate: Jānis Rudzītis
2016	Klubs "A41" / Gulbis; Ritvars Gulbis, Normunds Šaršūns, Aivars Avotiņš, Raivis Bušmanis, alternate: Artūrs Gerhards, тренер: Roberts Krusts	Kērlinga klubs "Rīga" / Trukšāns; Mārtiņš Trukšāns, Ainārs Gulbis, Arnis Veidemanis, Rihards Jeske, alternate: Sandris Buholcs	Talsu kērlinga klubs / Bremanis; Andris Bremanis Jun, Kristaps Vilks, Jānis Bremanis, Anrijs Briežkalns, alternate: Gundars Bremanis
2017	Junkers Bosch / Smilga; Kārlis Smilga, Artis Zentelis, Jānis Klīve, Didzis Pētersons	Kērlinga klubs "Rīga" / Trukšāns; Mārtiņš Trukšāns, Ainārs Gulbis, Arnis Veidemanis, Rihards Jeske, alternate: Sandris Buholcs	Klubs "A41" / Gulbis; Ritvars Gulbis, Raivis Bušmanis, Aivars Avotiņš, Normunds Šaršūns, alternate: Roberts Krusts
2018	Klubs "A41" / Gulbis; Ritvars Gulbis, Kristaps Vilks, Raivis Bušmanis, Aivars Avotiņš, alternate: Anrijs Briežkalns, coach: Roberts Krusts	Junkers Bosch / Smilga; Kārlis Smilga, Artis Zentelis, Jānis Klīve, Didzis Pētersons	Jelgavas kērlinga klubs / Rēdlihs; Jānis Rēdlihs, Jānis Rudzītis, Edgars Linužs, Modris Vītoliņš, alternate: Virginijus Baronas
2019	Junkers Bosch / Smilga; Artis Zentelis, Roberts Buncis, Jānis Vonda, Didzis Pētersons, alternate: Kārlis Smilga	Sporta Klubs "OB" / Regža; Ansis Regža, Renārs Freidensons, Edgars Mucenieks, Rihards Jeske	Klubs "A41" / Gulbis; Ritvars Gulbis, Ainārs Gulbis, Aivars Avotiņš, Normunds Šaršūns, alternate: Anrijs Briežkalns, coach: Roberts Krusts
2020	Jelgavas kērlinga klubs / Smilga; Kārlis Smilga, Artis Zentelis, Jānis Vonda, Didzis Pētersons, Roberts Buncis	Sporta Klubs "OB" / Regža; Ansis Regža, Jānis Rēdlihs, Aivars Purmalis, Aivars Gulbis, coach: Dace Regža	Klubs "A41" / Gulbis; Ritvars Gulbis, Aivars Avotiņš, Anrijs Briežkalns, Rihards Jeske, coach: Roberts Krusts
2021	Kērlinga klubs "Rīga" / Trukšāns; Mārtiņš Trukšāns, Jānis Klīve, Arnis Veidemanis, Sandris Buholcs	Sporta Klubs "OB" / Regža; Ansis Regža, Jānis Rēdlihs, Aivars Purmalis, Aivars Gulbis, coach: Dace Regža	Jelgavas kērlinga klubs / Krimskis; Aivis Krimskis, Dzintars Bērziņš, Edgars Linužs, Guntis Roziņš, alternate: Markuss Salmiņš
2022	Kērlinga klubs "Rīga" (CC Rīga) / Trukšāns; Mārtiņš Trukšāns, Jānis Klīve, Arnis Veidemanis, Sandris Buholcs, coach: Kārlis Smilga	Klubs "A41" / Gulbis; Ritvars Gulbis, Aivars Avotiņš, Anrijs Briežkalns, Rihards Jeske, alternate: Artis Zentelis, coach: Roberts Krusts	Talsu Kērlinga Klubs (TKK) / Zass; Kristaps Zass, Eduards Seļiverstovs, Toms Sondors, Deniss Smirnovs, alternate: Krišjānis Java, coach: Raimonds Vaivods
2023	Kērlinga klubs "Rīga" (CC Rīga) / Trukšāns; Mārtiņš Trukšāns, Jānis Klīve, Aivars Avotiņš, Sandris Buholcs, alternate: Kārlis Smilga	Klubs "A41" / Gulbis; Ritvars Gulbis, Artis Zentelis, Roberts Buncis, Anrijs Briežkalns	Kērlinga klubs "Rīga" (CC Rīga) / Veidemanis; Arnis Veidemanis, Krišs Vonda, Jānis Vonda, Didzis Pētersons, alternate: Rihards Jeske
2024	Talsu kērlinga klubs (TKK) / Zass Kristaps Zass, Eduards Seļiverstovs, Krišjānis Java, Toms Sondors, alternate: Deniss Smirnovs, coach: Raimonds Vaivods	Kērlinga klubs "Rīga" (CC Rīga) / Trukšāns Mārtiņš Trukšāns, Sandris Buholcs, Aivars Avotiņš, Jānis Klīve, alternate: Ritvars Gulbis	Kērlinga klubs "Rīga" (CC Rīga) / Veidemanis Arnis Veidemanis, Aleksandrs Baranovskis, Rihards Jeske, Roberts Buncis

== See also ==
- Latvian Women's Curling Championship
- Latvian Mixed Curling Championship
- Latvian Mixed Doubles Curling Championship
- Latvian Junior Mixed Doubles Curling Championship
