= Latvian Mixed Doubles Curling Championship =

Curling competition in Latvia

The Latvian Mixed Doubles Curling Championship (Latvian: Latvijas jaukto pāru čempionāts) is the national championship of mixed doubles curling in Latvia. It has been held annually since 2007. It is organized by the Latvian Curling Association (Latvian: Latvijas Kērlinga Asociācija).

The championship is usually held in November or December in the previous calendar year (i.e. "2018" means "championship of 2018–2019 season"). The winning team represents Latvia at the World championship later in the season.

== List of champions and medallists ==
Year	Champion		Runner-up		Bronze		Finish at Worlds
Year	Woman	Man	Woman	Man	Woman	Man	Finish at Worlds
2007	There is no championship results on Latvian Curling Association site; national team was: Iveta Staša, Robert Krusts						7
2008	Iveta Staša	Robert Krusts	Dace Regža	Ansis Regža	Ineta Mača	Aldis Abrickis	11
2009	Dace Regža	Ansis Regža	Vineta Smilga	Kārlis Smilga	Evita Regža	Renārs Freidensons	16
2010	Līga Caune	Gints Caune	Evita Regža	Renārs Freidensons	Dace Regža	Ansis Regža	24
2011	Vineta Smilga	Kārlis Smilga	Rasa Lubarte	Arnis Veidemanis	Dace Regža	Ansis Regža	11
2012	Evita Regža	Renārs Freidensons	Dace Regža	Ansis Regža	Iluta Linde	Arnis Veidemanis	23
2013	Dace Regža	Ansis Regža	Iluta Linde	Arnis Veidemanis	Lia Janberga	Andris Janbergs	17
2014	Iluta Linde	Arnis Veidemanis	Evita Regža	Renārs Freidensons	Dace Regža	Ansis Regža	12
2015	Ieva Rudzīte	Artis Zentelis	Iluta Linde	Arnis Veidemanis	Santa Blumberga	Andris Bremanis Jun	32
2016	Santa Blumberga	Andris Bremanis Jun	Iluta Linde	Arnis Veidemanis	Jeļena Rudzīte	Jānis Rudzītis	8
2017	Santa Blumberga	Ritvars Gulbis	Iluta Linde	Arnis Veidemanis	Dace Regža	Ansis Regža	25
2018	Santa Blumberga	Ritvars Gulbis	Iluta Linde	Arnis Veidemanis	Evita Regža	Renārs Freidensons	27
2020	Daina Barone	Arnis Veidemanis	Dace Regža	Ansis Regža	Ieva Rudzīte	Artis Zentelis	not held
2021	Ieva Rudzīte	Artis Zentelis	Dace Regža	Ansis Regža	Evelīna Barone	Ritvars Gulbis	not qualify
2022	Daina Barone	Arnis Veidemanis	Santa Blumberga-Bērziņa	Reinis Jučers	Dace Regža	Ansis Regža	not qualify
2023	Santa Blumberga-Bērziņa	Andris Bremanis	Evita Regža	Renārs Freidensons	Līga Avena	Aivars Avotiņš	not qualify
2024	Dace Regža	Ansis Regža	Katrīna Gaidule	Roberts Reinis Buncis	Sabīne Jeske	Arnis Veidemanis	not qualify
2025	Katrīna Gaidule	Roberts Reinis Buncis	Evelīna Barone	Kristaps Zass	Sabīne Jeske	Arnis Veidemanis	not qualify
2026	Katrīna Gaidule	Roberts Reinis Buncis	Viktorija Sčepaviča	Arnis Veidemanis	Betija Gulbe	Ritvars Gulbis	not qualify

== Medals record for curlers ==
As of 2026

Curler	1st place, gold medalist(s)	2nd place, silver medalist(s)	3rd place, bronze medalist(s)
Santa Blumberga-Bērziņa (Santa Blumberga)	4	1	1
Arnis Veidemanis	3	7	3
Ansis Regža	3	4	5
Dace Regža	3	4	5
Roberts Reinis Buncis	2	1	
Katrīna Gaidule	2	1	
Ritvars Gulbis	2		2
Andris Bremanis Jun	2		1
Ieva Rudzīte	2		1
Artis Zentelis	2		1
Daina Barone	2		
Iluta Linde	1	5	1
Renārs Freidensons	1	3	2
Evita Regža	1	3	2
Kārlis Smilga	1	1	
Vineta Smilga	1	1	
Gints Caune	1		
Līga Caune	1		
Robert Krusts	1		
Iveta Staša	1		
Evelīna Barone		1	1
Reinis Jučers		1	
Rasa Lubarte		1	
Viktorija Sčepaviča		1	
Kristaps Zass		1	
Aldis Abrickis			1
Līga Avena			1
Aivars Avotiņš			1
Betija Gulbe			1
Lia Janberga			1
Andris Janbergs			1
Sabīne Jeske			2
Ineta Mača			1
Jeļena Rudzīte			1
Jānis Rudzītis			1

== Junior mixed doubles ==
The Latvian Junior Mixed Doubles Curling Championship (Latvian: Latvijas junioru jauktie pāru čempionāts, LČ junioriem jauktajiem pāriem) is for curlers under the age of 21. It has been held annually since the 2021–2022 season, organized by the Latvian Curling Association (Latvian: Latvijas Kērlinga Asociācija). The winning team represents Latvia at the World Championship later in the season. The champions and medallists (line-ups shows in order: woman, man, coach (if exists)):

Year	Host city, dates	Champion	Runner-up	Bronze	Placement at Worlds
2022	Riga, Apr. 28 – May. 1	Katrīna Gaidule / Roberts Reinis Buncis	Marija Seļiverstova / Eduards Seļiverstovs	Helēna Reizniece / Markuss Salmiņš	–
2023	Riga, Feb. 9–12	Katrīna Gaidule / Roberts Reinis Buncis	Agate Regža / Kristaps Zass	Dārta Regža / Toms Sondors	–
2024	Riga, Jan. 4–7	Katrīna Gaidule / Roberts Reinis Buncis	Agate Regža / Kristaps Zass	Marija Seļiverstova / Eduards Seļiverstovs	–
2025	Riga, Jan. 23–26	Katrīna Gaidule / Roberts Reinis Buncis	Evelīna Barone / Kristaps Zass	Dārta Regža / Toms Sondors	14

=== Junior records ===
Curler	Gold	Silver	Bronze
Roberts Reinis Buncis	4		
Katrīna Gaidule	4		
Agate Regža		2	
Kristaps Zass		3	
Eduards Seļiverstovs		1	1
Marija Seļiverstova		1	1
Evelīna Barone		1	
Dārta Regža			2
Toms Sondors			2
Helēna Reizniece			1
Markuss Salmiņš			1

== See also ==
- Latvian Men's Curling Championship
- Latvian Women's Curling Championship
- Latvian Mixed Curling Championship
- Latvian Junior Mixed Doubles Curling Championship
