= Evelīna Barone =

Latvian curler (born 2003)

- Curler
- Born: 16 November 2003 (age 22); Riga, Latvia

Team
- Curling club: Jelgavas kērlinga klubs, Jelgava
- Skip: Evelīna Barone
- Third: Rēzija Ieviņa
- Second: Katrīna Gaidule
- Lead: Daina Barone
- Alternate: Betija Gulbe

Curling career
- Member Association: Latvia
- World Championship: 1 (2019)
- European Championship: 7 (2016, 2017, 2018, 2019, 2021, 2023, 2026)
- Other appearances: World Junior-B Championships: 6 (2016, 2017, 2018, 2019 (Jan), 2019 (Dec), 2024), European Junior Challenge: 1 (2015)
Medal record
Women's curling
European Curling Championships
Bronze medal – third place	2026 Ostrava
Latvian Women's Championship
Gold medal – first place	2016 Riga
Gold medal – first place	2019 Riga
Gold medal – first place	2020 Riga
Gold medal – first place	2021 Riga
Silver medal – second place	2018 Riga

Evelīna Barone (born 16 November 2003 in Riga) is a Latvian curler from Riga. She is known as the skip of the team to win Latvia's first ever European Curling Championship medals at the 2026 European Curling Championships.

== Career ==
At the national level, she is a two-time Latvian women's champion (2016, 2019) and seven-time junior champion (2014, 2015, 2016, 2017, 2018, 2019, 2024). When she was just 13, she competed in her first European Curling Championships at the 2016 European Curling Championships where the team finished sixth in the B Group with a 5–4 record. The team would have a strong showing in 2018 where they finished 4–5 in the A Division including defeating higher-ranked Scotland's Eve Muirhead. This qualified them for the 2019 World Women's Curling Championship. There, the team struggled, finishing in last place with a 1–11 record.

Barone would again skip Latvia at the 2026 European Curling Championships, where they would have a historic run - qualifying for the playoffs with a 3–2 record and after losing to eventual champions Sweden in the semifinal, Team Barone would beat Scotland's Fay Henderson 8–6 in the bronze medal game to win Latvia's first ever European Championship medals.

== Teams ==
Season	Skip	Third	Second	Lead	Alternate	Coach	Events
2013–14	Laura Gaidule	Madara Bremane	Helma Gerda Bidiņa	Evelīna Barone	Elizabete Laiviņa	Arnis Veidemanis	LJCC 2014 (gold)
2014–15	Santa Blumberga	Madara Bremane	Helma Gerda Bidiņa	Evelīna Barone	Tīna Siliņa	Iveta Staša-Šaršūne	EJCC 2015 (5th)
2014–15	Evelīna Barone	Helma Gerda Bidiņa	Madara Bremane	Santa Blumberga	Tīna Siliņa		LJCC 2015 (gold)
2014–15	Madara Bremane	Helma Gerda Bidiņa	Tīna Siliņa	Evelīna Barone		Andris Bremanis	LWCC 2015 (7th)
2015–16	Santa Blumberga	Madara Bremane	Helma Gerda Bidiņa	Evelīna Barone	Tīna Siliņa		
2015–16	Iveta Staša-Šaršūne	Ieva Krusta	Zanda Bikše	Evelīna Barone	Dace Munča		LWCC 2016 (gold)
2015–16	Tīna Siliņa	Evelīna Barone	Helma Gerda Bidiņa	Madara Bremane	Megija Anna Graumane	Santa Blumberga	LJCC 2016 (gold)
2016–17	Santa Blumberga	Ieva Krusta	Zanda Bikše	Evelīna Barone	Iveta Staša-Šaršūne	Iveta Staša-Šaršūne	ECC 2016 (16th)
2016–17	Megija Anna Graumane (fourth)	Helma Gerda Bidiņa	Evelīna Barone	Madara Bremane (skip)	Zane Ilze Brakovska		LJCC 2017 (gold)
2016–17	Iveta Staša-Šaršūne	Ieva Krusta	Santa Blumberga	Zanda Bikše	Evelīna Barone		LWCC 2017 (4th)
2017–18	Madara Bremane	Helma Gerda Bidiņa	Evelīna Barone	Zane Ilze Brakovska	Megija Anna Graumane	Santa Blumberga	LJCC 2018 (gold)
2017–18	Iveta Staša-Šaršūne	Ieva Krusta (ECC); Santa Blumberga (LWCC)	Santa Blumberga (ECC); Ieva Krusta (LWCC)	Evelīna Barone	Madara Bremane	Ritvars Gulbis	ECC 2017 (12th); LWCC 2018 (silver)
2018–19	Evelīna Barone (fourth)	Rēzija Ieviņa (skip)	Veronika Apse	Ērika Bitmete		Iveta Staša-Šaršūne	LJCC 2019 (gold)
2018–19	Iveta Staša-Šaršūne	Ieva Krusta (ECC); Santa Blumberga (WCC, LWCC)	Santa Blumberga (ECC); Ieva Krusta (WCC, LWCC)	Evelīna Barone	Tīna Siliņa (ECC, WCC)	Kārlis Smilga (ECC, WCC); Ritvars Gulbis (ECC); Roberts Krusts (WCC)	ECC 2018 (5th); LWCC 2019 (gold); WCC 2019 (13th)
2019–20	Iveta Staša-Šaršūne	Santa Blumberga	Ieva Krusta	Evelīna Barone	Tīna Silina	Ritvars Gulbis	ECC 2019 (10th)
2021–22	Evelīna Barone	Rēzija Ieviņa	Veronika Apse	Ērika Bitmete	Letīcija Ieviņa	Iveta Staša-Šaršūne	ECC 2021 (12th); WQE 2022 (bronze); WJCC 2022 (6th)
2021–22	Evelīna Barone (Fourth)	Santa Blumberga-Bērziņa (Skip)	Ieva Rudzīte	Ieva Krusta	Tīna Siliņa	Ritvars Gulbis; Roberts Krusts	Pre-OQE 2021 (1st); OQE 2021 (4th)
2022–23	Evelīna Barone	Rēzija Ieviņa	Veronika Apse	Ērika Bitmete	Letīcija Ieviņa	Iveta Staša-Šaršūne	WJCC 2023 (10th)
2023–24	Evelīna Barone	Rēzija Ieviņa	Veronika Apse	Marija Seliverstova	Letīcija Ieviņa	Iveta Staša-Šaršūne	ECC 2023 (14th)
2024–25	Evelīna Barone	Rēzija Ieviņa	Veronika Apse	Marija Seliverstova	Letīcija Ieviņa	Iveta Staša-Šaršūne	WJCC 2025 (9th)
2025–26	Evelīna Barone	Rēzija Ieviņa	Katrīna Gaidule	Daina Barone	Betija Gulbe	Iveta Staša-Šaršūne	ECC 2025 (11th)
2026–27	Evelīna Barone	Rēzija Ieviņa	Katrīna Gaidule	Daina Barone	Betija Gulbe	David Ramsay	ECC 2026 (bronze)
