= Santa Blumberga-Bērziņa =

Latvian female curler and coach

Santa Blumberga
- Curler
- Born: Santa Blumberga; 23 December 1994 (age 31); Ventspils, Latvia

Team
- Curling club: Jelgavas kērlinga klubs, Jelgava
- Skip: Santa Blumberga-Bērziņa
- Third: Ieva Rudzīte
- Second: Katrīna Gaidule
- Lead: Tīna Siliņa
- Alternate: Betija Gulbe
- Mixed doubles partner: Ritvars Gulbis

Curling career
- Member Association: Latvia
- World Championship: 1 (2019)
- World Mixed Doubles Championship: 3 (2017, 2018, 2019)
- European Championship: 6 (2015, 2016, 2017, 2018, 2019, 2022)
- Other appearances: World Junior-B Championships: 1 (2016), European Junior Challenge: 3 (2013, 2014, 2015)
Medal record
Women's curling
Latvian Women's Championship
Gold medal – first place	2019 Riga
Gold medal – first place	2020 Riga
Silver medal – second place	2015 Riga
Silver medal – second place	2018 Riga
Bronze medal – third place	2016 Riga

Santa Blumberga-Bērziņa (born 23 December 1994 in Ventspils as Santa Blumberga) is a Latvian curler and curling coach from Jelgava.

At the national level, she is a 2019 Latvian women's champion, four-time mixed doubles champion (2017, 2018, 2019, 2023) and two-time junior champion (2012, 2015).

== Teams ==
=== Women's ===
Season	Skip	Third	Second	Lead	Alternate	Coach	Events
2011–12	Santa Blumberga (fourth)	Tīna Siliņa (skip)	Katrīna Bindere	Una Ozoliņa	Agita Puriņa		LJCC 2012 (gold)
2012–13	Elizabete Laiviņa (fourth)	Una Kristiana Ozoliņa (skip)	Tīna Siliņa	Santa Blumberga	Laura Gaidule	Arnis Veidemanis	EJCC 2013 (11th)
2012–13	Santa Blumberga (fourth)	Una Ozoliņa (skip)	Tīna Siliņa	Katrīna Bindere	Kristīne Bulačņikova	Inga Apmane	LJCC 2013 (silver)
2013–14	Laura Gaidule	Elizabete Laiviņa	Santa Blumberga	Madara Bremane	Helma Gerda Bidiņa	Arnis Veidemanis	EJCC 2014 (10th)
2013–14	Kristīne Bulačņikova (fourth)	Tīna Siliņa	Una Ozoliņa	Santa Blumberga (skip)	Anna Marija Šefanovska	Dace Ābelīte	LJCC 2014 (silver)
2014–15	Santa Blumberga	Madara Bremane	Helma Gerda Bidiņa	Evelīna Barone	Tīna Siliņa	Iveta Staša-Šaršūne	EJCC 2015 (5th)
2014–15	Evelīna Barone	Helma Gerda Bidiņa	Madara Bremane	Santa Blumberga	Tīna Siliņa		LJCC 2015 (gold)
2014–15	Ineta Mača	Rasa Lubarte	Linda Mangale	Santa Blumberga	Maija Prozoroviča		LWCC 2015 (silver)
2015–16	Evita Regža	Dace Regža	Jeļena Rudzīte	Sabine Jeske	Santa Blumberga	Ansis Regža	ECC 2015 (13th)
2015–16	Santa Blumberga	Madara Bremane	Helma Gerda Bidiņa	Evelīna Barone	Tīna Siliņa		
2015–16	Santa Blumberga (fourth)	Iluta Linde (skip)	Ieva Bērziņa	Una Ģērmane	Evija Dompalma-Linuža		LWCC 2016 (bronze)
2016–17	Santa Blumberga	Ieva Krusta	Zanda Bikše	Evelīna Barone	Iveta Staša-Šaršūne	Iveta Staša-Šaršūne	ECC 2016 (16th)
2016–17	Iveta Staša-Šaršūne	Ieva Krusta	Santa Blumberga	Zanda Bikše	Evelīna Barone		LWCC 2017 (4th)
2017–18	Iveta Staša-Šaršūne	Ieva Krusta (ECC); Santa Blumberga (LWCC)	Santa Blumberga (ECC); Ieva Krusta (LWCC)	Evelīna Barone	Madara Bremane	Ritvars Gulbis	ECC 2017 (12th); LWCC 2018 (silver)
2018–19	Iveta Staša-Šaršūne	Ieva Krusta (ECC); Santa Blumberga (WCC, LWCC)	Santa Blumberga (ECC); Ieva Krusta (WCC, LWCC)	Evelīna Barone	Tīna Siliņa (ECC, WCC)	Kārlis Smilga (ECC, WCC); Ritvars Gulbis (ECC); Roberts Krusts (WCC)	ECC 2018 (5th); LWCC 2019 (gold); WCC 2019 (13th)
2019–20	Iveta Staša-Šaršūne	Santa Blumberga	Ieva Krusta	Evelīna Barone	Tīna Silina	Ritvars Gulbis	ECC 2019 (10th)
2020–21	Santa Blumberga-Bērziņa	Ieva Krusta	Tīna Silina	Helma Gerda Bidiņa		Ritvars Gulbis	LWCC 2021 (4th)
2021–22	Evelīna Barone (fourth)	Santa Blumberga-Bērziņa (skip)	Ieva Rudzīte	Ieva Krusta	Tīna Siliņa	Ritvars Gulbis; Roberts Krusts	Pre-OQE 2021 (1st); OQE 2021 (4th)
2022–23	Ieva Rudzīte (fourth)	Santa Blumberga-Bērziņa (skip)	Katrīna Gaidule	Tīna Silina	Betija Gulbe	Ritvars Gulbis	ECC 2022 (10th)

=== Mixed ===
Season	Skip	Third	Second	Lead	Alternate	Events
2013–14	Andris Janbergs	Santa Blumberga	Jānis Birznieks	Anda Dzelme	Lia Janberga	LMxCC 2014 (6th)
2014–15	Kārlis Smilga	Iluta Linde	Arnis Veidemanis	Santa Blumberga		LMxCC 2015 (silver)

=== Mixed doubles ===
Season	Female	Male	Coach	Events
2014–15	Santa Blumberga	Andris Bremanis		LMDCC 2014 (4th)
2015–16	Santa Blumberga	Andris Bremanis		LMDCC 2015 (bronze)
2016–17	Santa Blumberga	Andris Bremanis	Ritvars Gulbis (WMDCC)	LMDCC 2016 (gold); WMDCC 2017 (8th)
2017–18	Santa Blumberga	Ritvars Gulbis	Aivars Avotiņš (WMDCC)	LMDCC 2017 (gold); WMDCC 2018 (25th)
2018–19	Santa Blumberga	Ritvars Gulbis	Robert Krusts (WMDCC)	LMDCC 2018 (gold); WMDCC 2019 (27th)
2022–23	Santa Blumberga-Bērziņa	Andris Bremanis		LMDCC 2023 (gold)
2023–24	Santa Blumberga-Bērziņa	Anrijs Mikus Briežkalns		LMDCC 2024 (5th)

== Record as a coach of national teams ==
Year	Tournament, event	National team	Place
2017	2017 World Junior B Curling Championships	Latvia (junior women)	12
