= Evita Regža =

Latvian female curler and coach

- Curler
- Born: 26 October 1982 (age 44); Riga, Latvia

Team
- Curling club: SC OndulatB, Riga
- Mixed doubles partner: Ansis Regža

Curling career
- Member Association: Latvia
- World Championship: 1 (2014)
- World Mixed Doubles Championship: 1 (2013)
- European Championship: 6 (2003, 2006, 2007, 2010, 2013, 2015)
- Other appearances: European Mixed Championship: 2 (2011, 2012)
Medal record
Curling
Latvian Women's Championship
Gold medal – first place	2002
Gold medal – first place	2003
Gold medal – first place	2006
Gold medal – first place	2007
Gold medal – first place	2010
Gold medal – first place	2011
Gold medal – first place	2013
Gold medal – first place	2014
Gold medal – first place	2015
Silver medal – second place	2005
Silver medal – second place	2008
Silver medal – second place	2009
Silver medal – second place	2012
Bronze medal – third place	2004
Bronze medal – third place	2017

Evita Regža (born 26 October 1982 in Riga) is a Latvian female curler.

At the national level, she is a nine-time Latvian women's champion (2002, 2003, 2006, 2007, 2010, 2011, 2013, 2014, 2015), a 2011 mixed champion and a 2013 mixed doubles champion.

== Teams ==
=== Women's ===
Season	Skip	Third	Second	Lead	Alternate	Coach	Events
2003–04	Iveta Staša	Ieva Pikšena	Una Grava-Ģērmane	Zanda Bikše	Evita Regža		ECC 2003 (16th)
2006–07	Evita Regža	Dace Regža	Anete Regža	Solvita Gulbe			ECC 2006 (17th)
2007–08	Anete Zābere	Dace Regža	Solvita Gulbe	Jelena Stepanova	Evita Regža	Ansis Regža	ECC 2007 (19th)
2010–11	Evita Regža	Dace Regža	Vineta Smilga	Dace Pastare	Anete Zābere	Ansis Regža	ECC 2010 (8th)
2011–12	Evita Regža	Dace Regža	Ieva Bērziņa	Žaklīna Litauniece			
2012–13	Evita Regža	Dace Regža	Ieva Bērziņa	Žaklīna Litauniece			
2013–14	Evita Regža	Dace Regža	Ieva Bērziņa	Žaklīna Litauniece	Iluta Linde	Ansis Regža	ECC 2013 (7th); WCC 2014 (12th)
2015–16	Evita Regža	Dace Regža	Jeļena Rudzīte	Sabīne Jeske	Santa Blumberga	Ansis Regža	ECC 2015 (13th)
2017–18	Evita Regža	Anete Zābere	Jeļena Rudzīte	Vineta Smilga		Ansis Regža	LWCC 2018 (4th)
2018–19	Evita Regža	Ieva Bērziņa	Vineta Smilga	Sabīne Jeske	Anete Zābere	Ansis Regža	LWCC 2019 (4th)
2024–25	Agate Regža (Fourth)	Darta Regža	Anete Zābere	Evita Regža (Skip)	Dace Regža	Ansis Regža	ECC B-Division 2024 (TBD)

=== Mixed ===
Season	Skip	Third	Second	Lead	Events
2011–12	Ansis Regža	Evita Regža	Renārs Freidensons	Dace Regža	EMxCC 2011 (12th)
2012–13	Ansis Regža	Evita Regža	Renārs Freidensons	Dace Regža	EMxCC 2012 (13th)
2018–19	Ansis Regža	Evita Regža	Ainārs Gulbis	Kristīne Gulbe	LMxCC 2019 (silver)

=== Mixed doubles ===
Season	Male	Female	Coach	Events
2012–13	Renars Freidensons	Evita Regža	Aivars Purmalis	WMDCC 2013 (23rd)
2016–17	Renars Freidensons	Evita Regža		
2018–19	Renars Freidensons	Evita Regža		LMDCC 2018 (bronze)
2022–23	Ansis Regža	Evita Regža		
2022–23	Renars Freidensons	Evita Regža		LMDCC 2023 (silver)
2023–24	Renars Freidensons	Evita Regža		LMDCC 2024 (6th)

== Personal life ==
She is from family of known Latvian curlers: her father Ansis and mother Dace are curlers and curling coaches. Her younger sister Anete Zābere (née Regža) also is a curler.
