= Latvian Mixed Curling Championship =

The Latvian Mixed Curling Championship (Latvian: Latvijas jaukto komandu čempionāts) is the national championship of mixed curling in Latvia. It has been held annually since 2004. It is organized by the Latvian Curling Association (Latvian: Latvijas Kērlinga Asociācija).

== List of champions ==
Year	Winning team	Team line-up: skip (marked bold), third, second, lead, alternate(s), coach
2004	B&P	Ilva Beizaka, Aigars Beizaks, Didzis Pētersons, Anita Pētersone
2005	PPP	Inese Dobrā, Iveta Staša, Roberts Krusts, Ieva Pikšena, alternates: Jānis Klīve, Kārlis Smilga
2006	Skaistules un briesmoņi	Mārtiņš Trukšāns, Dace Munča, Zanda Bikše, Una Ģērmane, alternate: Artis Zentelis
2007	MICE	Kārlis Smilga, Ieva Palma, Maija Prozoroviča, Vineta Smilga, alternate: Jānis Klīve
2008	PPP	Iveta Staša-Šaršūne, Roberts Krusts, Una Ģērmane, Normunds Šaršūns, alternate: Ieva Krusta
2009	MICE	Jānis Klīve, Maija Prozorovica, Vineta Smilga, Kārlis Smilga, alternate: Ieva Krusta
2010	Jaunais MIX	??
2011	SK OB MIX	Ansis Regža, Evita Regža, Renārs Freidensons, Dace Regža
2012	Jelgavas Kērlinga Klubs / Krusts	Roberts Krusts, Ieva Krusta, Normunds Šaršūns, Iveta Staša-Šaršūne, alternate: Aivars Avotiņš
2013	Talsu Kērlinga Klubs / Veidemanis	Arnis Veidemanis, Iluta Linde, Rihards Jeske, Sabīne Jeske
2014	Jelgavas Kērlinga klubs / Smilga (MIX)	Kārlis Smilga, Iluta Linde, Arnis Veidemanis, Vineta Smilga
2015	Latvijas Kērlinga Klubs / Abrickis (MIX)	Aldis Abrickis, Ineta Mača, Andris Bremanis Jun, Rasa Lubarte, alternate: Artūrs Gerhards
2016	Sporta klubs OB / Regža (MIX)	Ansis Regža, Dace Regža, Aivars Gavars, Antra Zvane
2017	RKK/Rudzītis (MIX)	Jānis Rudzītis, Jeļena Rudzīte, Ritvars Graumanis, Dace Spilnere-Pūciņa
2018	SK OB/Regža (MIX)	Ansis Regža, Dace Regža, Aivars Gavars, Antra Zvane
2019	RKK/Rudzīte (MIX)	Jānis Rudzītis, Jeļena Rudzīte, Didzis Pētersons, Dace Spilnere-Pūciņa
2020	not held because COVID-19	
2021	SK OB/Vonda	Krišs Vonda, Elīza Stabulniece, Reinis Jučers, Katrīna Gaidule
2022	SK OB/Freidensons	Renārs Freidensons, Aleksandrs Baranovskis, Evita Regža, Betija Gulbe
2023	CC Rīga/Veidemanis	Arnis Veidemanis, Evelīna Barone, Roberts Buncis, Daina Barone

== See also ==
- Latvian Men's Curling Championship
- Latvian Women's Curling Championship
- Latvian Mixed Doubles Curling Championship
- Latvian Junior Mixed Doubles Curling Championship
