= Ieva Rudzīte =

Latvian curler (born 1989)

- Curler
- Born: 15 August 1989 (age 37); Riga, Latvia

Team
- Curling club: Jelgavas kērlinga klubs, Jelgava
- Skip: Santa Blumberga-Bērziņa
- Fourth: Ieva Rudzīte
- Second: Katrīna Gaidule
- Lead: Tīna Siliņa
- Alternate: Betija Gulbe
- Mixed doubles partner: Artis Zentelis

Curling career
- Member Association: Latvia
- World Mixed Doubles Championship: 1 (2016)
- European Championship: 3 (2011, 2014, 2022)
Medal record
Women's curling
Latvian Women's Championship
Gold medal – first place	2017 Riga
Gold medal – first place	2018 Riga
Silver medal – second place	2011 Riga
Silver medal – second place	2019 Riga
Silver medal – second place	2021 Riga
Bronze medal – third place	2020 Riga

Ieva Rudzīte (born 15 August 1989 in Riga) is a Latvian curler.

At the national level, she is a two-time Latvian women's champion (2017, 2018) and a two-time mixed doubles champion (2015, 2021).

== Teams ==
=== Women's ===
Season	Skip	Third	Second	Lead	Alternate	Coach	Events
2009–10	Jeļena Rudzīte	Ieva Rudzīte	Anita Jansone-Laizāne	Kristīne Landmesere	Baiba Dzelme, Dace Spilnere-Pūciņa		LWCC 2010 (5th)
2010–11	Ineta Mača	Elēna Kāpostiņa	Rasa Lubarte	Ieva Rudzīte			LWCC 2011 (silver)
2011–12	Ineta Mača	Elēna Kāpostiņa	Rasa Lubarte	Ieva Rudzīte		Artis Zentelis	ECC 2011 (9th)
2011–12	Ineta Mača	Elēna Kāpostiņa	Rasa Lubarte	Ieva Rudzīte	Sabine Viksne		
2011–12	Ineta Mača	Elēna Kāpostiņa	Ieva Rudzīte	Sabīne Jeske	Rasa Lubarte		LWCC 2012 (4th)
2013–14	Ieva Rudzīte	Līga Avena	Daina Barone	Rasa Brūna		Artis Zentelis	LWCC 2014 (5th)
2014–15	Iveta Staša-Šaršūne	Ieva Rudzīte	Daina Barone	Rasa Brūna	Līga Avena	Artis Zentelis	ECC 2014 (9th)
2014–15	Ieva Rudzīte	Līga Avena	Daina Barone	Rasa Brūna		Artis Zentelis	LWCC 2015 (4 место)
2015–16	Ieva Rudzīte	Līga Avena	Daina Barone	Rasa Brūna	Ieva Palma (ex Štauere)	Artis Zentelis	LWCC 2016 (4th)
2016–17	Ieva Rudzīte	Līga Avena	Daina Barone	Rasa Brūna	Moa Norell		
2016–17	Ieva Rudzīte	Līga Avena	Daina Barone	Rasa Brūna	Ieva Palma (ex Štauere)		LWCC 2017 (gold)
2017–18	Ieva Rudzīte	Līga Avena	Daina Barone	Ieva Palma (ex Štauere)	Zane Ilze Brakovska	Artis Zentelis	LWCC 2018 (gold)
2018–19	Ieva Rudzīte	Līga Avena	Daina Barone	Zane Ilze Brakovska		Artis Zentelis	LWCC 2019 (silver)
2019–20	Ieva Rudzīte	Līga Avena	Zane Ilze Brakovska	Daina Barone		Artis Zentelis	LWCC 2020 (bronze)
2020–21	Ieva Rudzīte	Līga Avena	Daina Barone	Zane Ilze Brakovska		Arnis Veidemanis	LWCC 2021 (silver)

=== Mixed ===
Season	Skip	Third	Second	Lead	Alternate	Events
2008–09	Ieva Rudzīte	Rihards Jeske	Jeļena Rudzīte	Jānis Rudzītis	Kristīne Landmesere, Dace Spilnere-Pūciņa	LMxCC 2009 (7th)
2010–11	Jānis Vonda	Ieva Rudzīte	Dzintars Bērziņš	Zanda Priste-Vonda		LMxCC 2011 (9th)
2011–12	Artis Zentelis	Zanda Bikše	Jānis Klīve	Ieva Rudzīte		LMxCC 2012 (bronze)
2013–14	Artis Zentelis	Zanda Bikše	Jānis Klīve	Ieva Rudzīte	Artūrs Gerhards	LMxCC 2014 (bronze)
2014–15	Artis Zentelis	Ieva Rudzīte	Jānis Klīve	Daina Barone		LMxCC 2015 (bronze)

=== Mixed doubles ===
Season	Female	Male	Coach	Events
2015–16	Ieva Rudzīte	Artis Zentelis	Robert Krusts (WMDCC)	LMDCC 2015 (gold); WMDCC 2016 (32nd)
2016–17	Ieva Rudzīte	Artis Zentelis		LMDCC 2016 (6th)
2019–20	Ieva Rudzīte	Artis Zentelis		WMDQ 2019 (7th)
2019–20	Ieva Rudzīte	Artis Zentelis		LMDCC 2020 (bronze)
2020–21	Ieva Rudzīte	Artis Zentelis		LMDCC 2021 (gold)
