= Daina Barone =

Latvian curler (born 1980)

- Curler
- Born: 24 March 1980 (age 46); Riga, Latvia

Team
- Curling club: Jelgavas kērlinga klubs, Jelgava
- Skip: Evelīna Barone
- Third: Rēzija Ieviņa
- Second: Katrīna Gaidule
- Lead: Daina Barone
- Alternate: Betija Gulbe

Curling career
- Member Association: Latvia
- European Championship: 2 (2014, 2026)
Medal record
Women's curling
European Curling Championships
Bronze medal – third place	2026 Ostrava
Latvian Women's Championship
Gold medal – first place	2017 Riga
Gold medal – first place	2018 Riga
Silver medal – second place	2019 Riga
Silver medal – second place	2021 Riga
Bronze medal – third place	2020 Riga
Lithuanian Women's Championship
Silver medal – second place	2014 Riga
Silver medal – second place	2015 Riga

Daina Barone (born 24 March 1980 in Riga) is a Latvian curler. She is known as a member of the team to win Latvia's first ever European Curling Championship medals at the 2026 European Curling Championships.

At the national level, she is a two-time Latvian women's champion (2017, 2018) and a mixed doubles champion (2020). She also participated in Lithuanian women's club team on 2014 and 2015 Lithuanian women's championships (those championships were held in Riga), two-time runner-up.

== Teams ==
=== Women's ===
Season	Skip	Third	Second	Lead	Alternate	Coach	Events
Lithuania
2013–14	Justina Lenortavičiūtė	Agnė Valaskevičiūtė	Laurita Stasiūnaitė	Daina Barone	Giedrė Vilčinskaitė, Rūta Romeikienė	Vygantas Zalieckas	LithWCC 2014 (silver)
2014–15	Justina Lenortavičiūtė	Agnė Valaskevičiūtė	Laurita Stasiūnaitė	Daina Barone			LithWCC 2015 (silver)
Latvia
2013–14	Ieva Rudzīte	Līga Avena	Daina Barone	Rasa Brūna		Artis Zentelis	LWCC 2014 (5th)
2014–15	Iveta Staša-Šaršūne	Ieva Rudzīte	Daina Barone	Rasa Brūna	Līga Avena	Artis Zentelis	ECC 2014 (9th)
2014–15	Ieva Rudzīte	Līga Avena	Daina Barone	Rasa Brūna		Artis Zentelis	LWCC 2015 (4 место)
2015–16	Ieva Rudzīte	Līga Avena	Daina Barone	Rasa Brūna	Ieva Palma (ex Štauere)	Artis Zentelis	LWCC 2016 (4th)
2016–17	Ieva Rudzīte	Līga Avena	Daina Barone	Rasa Brūna	Moa Norell		
2016–17	Ieva Rudzīte	Līga Avena	Daina Barone	Rasa Brūna	Ieva Palma (ex Štauere)		LWCC 2017 (gold)
2017–18	Ieva Rudzīte	Līga Avena	Daina Barone	Ieva Palma (ex Štauere)	Zane Ilze Brakovska	Artis Zentelis	LWCC 2018 (gold)
2018–19	Ieva Rudzīte	Līga Avena	Daina Barone	Zane Ilze Brakovska		Artis Zentelis	LWCC 2019 (silver)
2019–20	Ieva Rudzīte	Līga Avena	Zane Ilze Brakovska	Daina Barone		Artis Zentelis	LWCC 2020 (bronze)
2020–21	Ieva Rudzīte	Līga Avena	Daina Barone	Zane Ilze Brakovska		Arnis Veidemanis	LWCC 2021 (silver)
2025–26	Evelīna Barone	Rēzija Ieviņa	Katrīna Gaidule	Daina Barone	Betija Gulbe	Iveta Staša-Šaršūne	ECC 2025 (11th)
2026–27	Evelīna Barone	Rēzija Ieviņa	Katrīna Gaidule	Daina Barone	Betija Gulbe	David Ramsay	ECC 2026 (bronze)

=== Mixed ===
Season	Skip	Third	Second	Lead	Alternate	Events
2014–15	Artis Zentelis	Ieva Rudzīte	Jānis Klīve	Daina Barone		LMxCC 2015 (bronze)
2020–21	Arnis Veidemanis	Daina Barone	Roberts Buncis	Lauma Rēdliha		LMxCC 2021 (5th)

=== Mixed doubles ===
Season	Female	Male	Coach	Events
2019–20	Daina Barone	Arnis Veidemanis		LMDCC 2020 (gold)
2020–21	Daina Barone	Arnis Veidemanis		LMDCC 2021 (6th)
2021–22	Daina Barone	Arnis Veidemanis		LMDCC 2022 (gold)
2022–23	Daina Barone	Arnis Veidemanis		LMDCC 2023 (7th)
2023–24	Daina Barone	Jānis Klīve		LMDCC 2024 (7th)
