= Dace Regža =

Latvian female curler and coach

- Curler ♀
- Born: 25 April 1962 (age 64)

Team
- Curling club: SC OndulatB, Riga
- Mixed doubles partner: Ansis Regža

Curling career
- Member Association: Latvia
- World Championship: 1 (2014)
- World Mixed Doubles Championship: 3 (2010, 2012, 2014)
- European Championship: 6 (2002, 2006, 2007, 2010, 2013, 2015)
- Other appearances: World Mixed Championship: 1 (2016), European Mixed Championship: 2 (2011, 2012), World Senior Championships: 2 (2016, 2018)
Medal record
Curling
Latvian Women's Championship
Gold medal – first place	2002
Gold medal – first place	2003
Gold medal – first place	2006
Gold medal – first place	2007
Gold medal – first place	2010
Gold medal – first place	2011
Gold medal – first place	2013
Gold medal – first place	2014
Gold medal – first place	2015
Silver medal – second place	2005
Silver medal – second place	2008
Silver medal – second place	2009
Silver medal – second place	2012
Bronze medal – third place	2004
Bronze medal – third place	2017

Dace Regža (born 25 April 1962) is a Latvian female curler and curling coach.

At the national level, she is a nine-time Latvian women's champion (2002, 2003, 2006, 2007, 2010, 2011, 2013, 2014, 2015), a three-time mixed champion (2011, 2016, 2018) and a three-time mixed doubles champion (2009, 2014, 2024).

== Teams ==
=== Women's ===
Season	Skip	Third	Second	Lead	Alternate	Coach	Events
2002–03	Ilva Beizaka	Iveta Staša	Una Grava-Ģērmane	Dace Regža	Ieva Pikšena		ECC 2002 (14th)
2006–07	Evita Regža	Dace Regža	Anete Regža	Solvita Gulbe			ECC 2006 (17th)
2007–08	Anete Zabere	Dace Regža	Solvita Gulbe	Jelena Stepanova	Evita Regža	Ansis Regža	ECC 2007 (19th)
2010–11	Evita Regža	Dace Regža	Vineta Smilga	Dace Pastare	Anete Zabere	Ansis Regža	ECC 2010 (8th)
2011–12	Evita Regža	Dace Regža	Ieva Bērziņa	Žaklīna Litauniece			
2012–13	Evita Regža	Dace Regža	Ieva Bērziņa	Žaklīna Litauniece			
2013–14	Evita Regža	Dace Regža	Ieva Bērziņa	Žaklīna Litauniece	Iluta Linde	Ansis Regža	ECC 2013 (7th); WCC 2014 (12th)
2015–16	Evita Regža	Dace Regža	Jeļena Rudzīte	Sabine Jeske	Santa Blumberga	Ansis Regža	ECC 2015 (13th)
2015–16	Elēna Kāpostiņa	Dace Regža	Maija Prozoroviča	Elga Bremane		Ansis Regža	WSCC 2016 (10th)
2017–18	Elēna Kāpostiņa	Dace Zīle	Dace Regža	Maija Prozoroviča		Ansis Regža	WSCC 2018 (9th)

=== Mixed ===
Season	Skip	Third	Second	Lead	Events
2011–12	Ansis Regža	Evita Regža	Renārs Freidensons	Dace Regža	EMxCC 2011 (12th)
2012–13	Ansis Regža	Evita Regža	Renārs Freidensons	Dace Regža	EMxCC 2012 (13th)
2016–17	Ansis Regža	Dace Regža	Aivars Gavars	Antra Zvane	WMxCC 2016 (20th)
2017–18	Ansis Regža	Dace Regža	Aivars Gavars	Antra Zvane	LMxCC 2018 (gold)

=== Mixed doubles ===
Season	Male	Female	Coach	Events
2009–10	Ansis Regža	Dace Regža		WMDCC 2010 (16th)
2011–12	Ansis Regža	Dace Regža		WMDCC 2012 (11th)
2013–14	Ansis Regža	Dace Regža	Aivars Purmalis	WMDCC 2014 (17th)
2017–18	Ansis Regža	Dace Regža		LMDCC 2017 (bronze)
2018–19	Ansis Regža	Dace Regža		LMDCC 2018 (4th)
2022–23	Ansis Regža	Dace Regža		LMDCC 2023 (6th)
2023–24	Ansis Regža	Dace Regža		LMDCC 2024 (gold)

== Record as a coach of national teams ==
Year	Tournament, event	National team	Place
2016	2016 World Senior Curling Championships	Latvia (senior men)	13
2018	2018 World Senior Curling Championships	Latvia (senior men)	13

== Personal life ==
She is from family of Latvian curlers. Her husband Ansis is also a curler and curling coach. Their daughters, Evita Regža and Anete Zābere also are curlers.
