= Ritvars Gulbis =

Latvian male curler and coach

- Curler ♂
- Born: 31 January 1980 (age 46)

Team
- Curling club: Klubs A41, Riga
- Mixed doubles partner: Santa Blumberga

Curling career
- Member Association: Latvia
- World Mixed Doubles Championship: 2 (2018, 2019)
- European Championship: 13 (2003, 2005, 2007, 2008, 2009, 2010, 2011, 2012, 2013, 2014, 2015, 2016, 2018)
Medal record
Curling
Latvian Men's Championship
Gold medal – first place	2005 Riga
Gold medal – first place	2007 Riga
Gold medal – first place	2008 Riga
Gold medal – first place	2009 Riga
Gold medal – first place	2010 Riga
Gold medal – first place	2011 Riga
Gold medal – first place	2012 Riga
Gold medal – first place	2013 Riga
Gold medal – first place	2014 Riga
Gold medal – first place	2015 Riga
Gold medal – first place	2016 Riga
Gold medal – first place	2018 Riga
Silver medal – second place	2004 Riga
Bronze medal – third place	2006 Riga
Bronze medal – third place	2007 Riga
Bronze medal – third place	2019 Riga

Ritvars Gulbis (born 31 January 1980) is a Latvian curler and curling coach.

One of the most awarded curlers in Latvia – as of May 2018 he is a twelve-time Latvian men's champion curler (2005, 2007, 2008, 2009, 2010, 2011, 2012, 2013, 2014, 2015, 2016, 2018) and two-time Latvian mixed doubles champion curler (2017, 2018).

== Teams ==
=== Men's ===
Season	Skip	Third	Second	Lead	Alternate	Coach	Events
2003–04	Ainārs Gulbis	Ritvars Gulbis	Pēteris Šveisbergs	Aivars Avotiņš	Ilgonis Zids		ECC 2003 (19th)
2005–06	Ainārs Gulbis (fourth)	Ritvars Gulbis (skip)	Aivars Avotiņš	Normunds Šaršūns		Iveta Staša, Brian Gray	ECC 2005 (21st)
2007–08	Ritvars Gulbis	Ainārs Gulbis	Aivars Avotiņš	Normunds Šaršūns		Brian Gray	ECC 2007 (13th)
2008–09	Ritvars Gulbis	Ainārs Gulbis	Aivars Avotiņš	Normunds Šaršūns		Brian Gray	ECC 2008 (20th)
2009–10	Ritvars Gulbis	Ainārs Gulbis	Normunds Šaršūns	Aivars Avotiņš		Brian Gray	ECC 2009 (15th)
2010–11	Ritvars Gulbis	Ainārs Gulbis	Normunds Šaršūns	Aivars Avotiņš		Brian Gray (not ECC)	ECC 2010 (12th)
2011–12	Ritvars Gulbis	Ainārs Gulbis	Normunds Šaršūns	Aivars Avotiņš		Iveta Staša-Šaršūne	ECC 2011 (9th)
2012–13	Ritvars Gulbis	Normunds Šaršūns	Aivars Avotiņš	Robert Krusts		Iveta Staša-Šaršūne	ECC 2012 (12th)
2013–14	Ritvars Gulbis	Normunds Šaršūns	Aivars Avotiņš	Artūrs Gerhards	Raivis Bušmanis	Robert Krusts	ECC 2013 (8th)
2014–15	Ritvars Gulbis	Normunds Šaršūns	Artūrs Gerhards	Aivars Avotiņš	Jānis Klīve	Karri Willms	ECC 2014 (10th)
2015–16	Ritvars Gulbis	Normunds Šaršūns	Aivars Avotiņš	Raivis Bušmanis	Artūrs Gerhards	Robert Krusts	ECC 2015 (13th)
2016–17	Ritvars Gulbis	Normunds Šaršūns	Aivars Avotiņš	Raivis Bušmanis	Jānis Klīve	Robert Krusts	ECC 2016 (15th)
2016–17	Ritvars Gulbis	Raivis Bušmanis	Aivars Avotiņš	Normunds Šaršūns		Robert Krusts	LMCC 2017 (bronze)
2017–18	Ritvars Gulbis	Kristaps Vilks	Raivis Bušmanis	Aivars Avotiņš	Anrijs Briežkalns	Robert Krusts	LMCC 2018 (gold)
2018–19	Ritvars Gulbis	Raivis Bušmanis	Aivars Avotiņš	Anrijs Mikus Briezkalns	Kristaps Vilks	Robert Krusts	ECC 2018 (14th)
2018–19	Ritvars Gulbis	Ainārs Gulbis	Aivars Avotiņš	Normunds Šaršūns	Anrijs Briežkalns	Robert Krusts	LMCC 2019 (bronze)

=== Mixed ===
Season	Skip	Third	Second	Lead	Alternate	Events
2003–04	Ritvars Gulbis	Ainārs Gulbis	Anita Jansone-Laizāne	Maija Prozoroviča	Aivars Avotiņš	LMxCC 2004 (8th)

=== Mixed doubles ===
Season	Female	Male	Coach	Events
2017–18	Santa Blumberga	Ritvars Gulbis	Aivars Avotiņš (WMDCC)	LMDCC 2017 (gold); WMDCC 2018 (25th)
2018–19	Santa Blumberga	Ritvars Gulbis	Robert Krusts (WMDCC)	LMDCC 2018 (gold); WMDCC 2019 (27th)

== Record as a coach of national teams ==
Year	Tournament, event	National team	Place
2017	2017 World Mixed Doubles Curling Championship	Latvia (mixed double)	8
2017	2017 European Curling Championships	Latvia (women)	12
2018	2018 European Curling Championships	Latvia (women)	5
2019	2019 European Curling Championships	Latvia (women)	10
