= Arnis Veidemanis =

Latvian curler and coach

- Curler ♂

Team
- Curling club: Kērlinga klubs "Rīga", Riga
- Skip: Arnis Veidemanis
- Third: Roberts Reinis Buncis
- Second: Aleksandrs Baranovskis
- Lead: Rihards Jeske
- Alternate: Janis Klive
- Mixed doubles partner: Daina Barone

Curling career
- Member Association: Latvia
- World Mixed Doubles Championship: 1 (2015)
- European Championship: 2 (2019, 2022)
- Other appearances: European Mixed Championship: 1 (2013, 2014)
Medal record
Curling
Latvian Men's Championship
Gold medal – first place	2021 Riga
Silver medal – second place	2012 Riga
Silver medal – second place	2015 Riga
Silver medal – second place	2016 Riga
Silver medal – second place	2017 Riga

Arnis Veidemanis is a Latvian curler, curling coach and former darts player.

At the national level, he is a Latvian men's champion curler (2021), two-time Latvian mixed champion curler (2013, 2014) and two-time Latvian mixed doubles champion curler (2014, 2020).

== Teams ==
=== Men's ===
Season	Skip	Third	Second	Lead	Alternate	Coach	Events
2006–07	Zigmunds Regža	Aldis Abrickis	Dzintars Bērziņš	Aivars Gulbis	Arnis Veidemanis, Rihards Trulis		LMCC 2007 (9th)
2007–08	Rihards Trulis	Einārs Vilcāns	Arnis Veidemanis	Aldis Abrickis			LMCC 2008 (8th)
2008–09	Einārs Vilcāns	Arnis Veidemanis	Jānis Puls	Aldis Abrickis	Rihards Trulis		LMCC 2009 (7th)
2009–10	Aldis Abrickis	Jānis Puls	Arnis Veidemanis	Jurijs Kovešņikovs	Einārs Vilcāns		LMCC 2010 (6th)
2010–11	Arnis Veidemanis	Aldis Abrickis	Rihards Jeske	Aivars Gavars	Einārs Vilcāns		LMCC 2011 (6th)
2011–12	Aldis Abrickis (fourth)	Ansis Regža (skip)	Arnis Veidemanis	Jānis Puls	Einārs Vilcāns		LMCC 2012 (silver)
2012–13	Jānis Vonda (fourth)	Aldis Abrickis (skip)	Arnis Veidemanis	Jānis Puls	Einārs Vilcāns		LMCC 2013 (8th)
2013–14	Arnis Veidemanis	Aldis Abrickis	Gints Caune	Roberts Birznieks	Einārs Vilcāns		LMCC 2014 (6th)
2014–15	Arnis Veidemanis	Aldis Abrickis	Andris Bremanis Jun	Raimonds Vaivods	Renārs Freidensons		LMCC 2015 (silver)
2015–16	Mārtiņš Trukšāns	Ainārs Gulbis	Arnis Veidemanis	Rihards Jeske	Sandris Buholcs		LMCC 2016 (silver)
2016–17	Mārtiņš Trukšāns	Ainārs Gulbis	Arnis Veidemanis	Rihards Jeske	Sandris Buholcs		LMCC 2017 (silver)
2017–18	Mārtiņš Trukšāns	Ainārs Gulbis	Rihards Jeske	Sandris Buholcs	Arnis Veidemanis		LMCC 2018 (4th)
2018–19	Arnis Veidemanis (fourth)	Jānis Rēdlihs	Jānis Rudzītis	Edgars Linužs	Aivis Krimskis		LMCC 2019 (5th)
2019–20	Mārtiņš Trukšāns	Jānis Klīve	Arnis Veidemanis	Sandris Buholcs	Jānis Rudzītis (ECC)	Erkki Lill	ECC 2019 (17th); LMCC 2020 (4th)
2020–21	Mārtiņš Trukšāns	Jānis Klīve	Arnis Veidemanis	Sandris Buholcs			LMCC 2021 (gold)
2025–26	Arnis Veidemanis	Roberts Reinis Buncis	Aleksandrs Baranovskis	Rihards Jeske	Janis Klive		WCC Pre-Q 2026 (TBD)

=== Mixed ===
Season	Skip	Third	Second	Lead	Alternate	Coach	Events
2007–08	Aivars Gulbis	Ieva Bērziņa	Arnis Veidemanis	Ieva Cielava			LMxCC 2008 (8th)
2008–09	Arnis Veidemanis	Sanita Saulgrieze	Einārs Vilcāns	Maija Smeltere	Aivars Gulbis		LMxCC 2009 (bronze)
2010–11	Arnis Veidemanis	Rasa Lubarte	Rihards Jeske	Sabīne Jeske	Einārs Vilcāns		LMxCC 2011 (7th)
2011–12	Arnis Veidemanis	Ineta Mača	Aldis Abrickis	Rasa Lubarte			LMxCC 2012 (5th)
2012–13	Arnis Veidemanis	Iluta Linde	Rihards Jeske	Sabīne Jeske			LMxCC 2013 (gold)
2013–14	Arnis Veidemanis	Iluta Linde	Rihards Jeske	Sabīne Jeske		John Summers	EuMxCC 2013 (14th)
2013–14	Kārlis Smilga	Iluta Linde	Arnis Veidemanis	Vineta Smilga			LMxCC 2014 (gold)
2014–15	Kārlis Smilga	Iluta Linde	Arnis Veidemanis	Vineta Smilga		Raimonds Vaivods	EuMxCC 2014 (24th)
2014–15	Kārlis Smilga	Iluta Linde	Arnis Veidemanis	Santa Blumberga			LMxCC 2015 (silver)
2020–21	Arnis Veidemanis	Daina Barone	Roberts Buncis	Lauma Rēdliha			LMxCC 2021 (5th)

=== Mixed doubles ===
Season	Female	Male	Coach	Events
2011–12	Rasa Lubarte	Arnis Veidemanis		LMDCC 2011 (silver)
2012–13	Iluta Linde	Arnis Veidemanis		LMDCC 2012 (bronze)
2013–14	Iluta Linde	Arnis Veidemanis		LMDCC 2013 (silver)
2014–15	Iluta Linde	Arnis Veidemanis	Ivars Cernajs (WMDCC)	LMDCC 2014 (gold); WMDCC 2015 (12th)
2015–16	Iluta Linde	Arnis Veidemanis		LMDCC 2015 (silver)
2016–17	Iluta Linde	Arnis Veidemanis		LMDCC 2016 (silver)
2017–18	Iluta Linde	Arnis Veidemanis		LMDCC 2017 (silver)
2018–19	Iluta Linde	Arnis Veidemanis		LMDCC 2018 (silver)
2019–20	Daina Barone	Arnis Veidemanis		LMDCC 2020 (gold)
2020–21	Daina Barone	Arnis Veidemanis		LMDCC 2021 (6th)
2021–22	Daina Barone	Arnis Veidemanis		LMDCC 2022 (gold)
2022–23	Daina Barone	Arnis Veidemanis		LMDCC 2023 (7th)
2023–24	Daina Barone	Arnis Veidemanis		
2023–24	Sabīne Jeske	Arnis Veidemanis		LMDCC 2024 (bronze)

== Record as a coach of national teams ==
Year	Tournament, event	National team	Place
2013	2013 European Junior Curling Challenge	Latvia (junior women)	11
2014	2014 European Junior Curling Challenge	Latvia (junior women)	10
2018	2018 World Wheelchair-B Curling Championship	Latvia (wheelchair)	3rd place, bronze medalist(s)
2019	2019 World Wheelchair Curling Championship	Latvia (wheelchair)	9
2019	2019 European Curling Championships	Lithuania (men)	23
2019	2019 World Wheelchair-B Curling Championship	Lithuania (wheelchair)	13
2020	2020 World Wheelchair Curling Championship	Latvia (wheelchair)	7
2021	2021 World Wheelchair Curling Championship	Latvia (wheelchair)	8
