= Zanda Bikše =

Latvian curler

- Curler
- Born: 1 October 1970 (age 56); Riga, Latvia

Team
- Curling club: Jelgavas KK, Jelgava
- Skip: Iveta Staša-Šaršūne
- Third: Ieva Krusta
- Second: Zanda Bikše
- Lead: Santa Blumberga

Curling career
- World Championship: 2 (2010, 2013)
- European Championship: 6 (2003, 2005, 2008, 2009, 2012, 2016)

Zanda Bikše is a Latvian curler.

She was lead for the Latvian team at the 2010 Ford World Women's Curling Championship in Swift Current, Canada. She also represented Latvia at the 2013 World Women's Curling Championship at home in Riga, Latvia, finishing in last place with a 1–10 record.
