= Ansis Regža =

Latvian male curler and coach

- Curler ♂
- Born: 26 July 1963 (age 63); Riga, Latvia

Team
- Curling club: SC OndulatB, Riga, Nicoll / Regža
- Mixed doubles partner: Evita Regža

Curling career
- Member Association: Latvia
- World Mixed Doubles Championship: 3 (2010, 2012, 2014)
- European Championship: 1 (2002)
- Other appearances: World Mixed Championship: 1 (2016), European Mixed Championship: 2 (2011, 2012), World Senior Championships: 6 (2015, 2016, 2018, 2019, 2022, 2024)
Medal record
Curling
Latvian Men's Championship
Gold medal – first place	2003 Riga
Silver medal – second place	2008 Riga
Silver medal – second place	2010 Riga
Silver medal – second place	2011 Riga
Silver medal – second place	2012 Riga
Silver medal – second place	2019 Riga
Silver medal – second place	2020 Riga
Silver medal – second place	2021 Riga
Bronze medal – third place	2009 Riga
Bronze medal – third place	2013 Riga

Ansis Regža (born 26 July 1963 in Riga) is a Latvian curler and curling coach.

At the national level, as of 2022, he is a 2003 Latvian men's champion, three-time Latvian mixed champion curler (2011, 2016, 2018) and three-time Latvian mixed doubles champion curler (2009, 2013, 2024).

== Teams ==
=== Men's ===
Season	Skip	Third	Second	Lead	Alternate	Coach	Events
2001–02	Kārlis Šlesers	Mārtiņš Smelters	Ansis Regža	Jānis Ratnieks	E. Imše, M. Sils	Edgars Ratnieks	LMCC 2002 (4th)
2002–03	Pēteris Šveisbergs	Janis Rudzitis	Aivars Kuznecovs	Ivars Paegle	Ansis Regža		ECC 2002 (19th)
2002–03	Ansis Regža	Gatis Šķila	Uldis Vrubļevskis	Jānis Bāliņš			LMCC 2003 (gold)
2003–04	Ansis Regža	Intars Oliņš	Uldis Vrubļevskis	Jānis Bāliņš	Andris Borģis-Vernušs		LMCC 2004 (5th)
2004–05	Ansis Regža	Aivars Purmalis	Uldis Vrubļevskis	Jānis Bāliņš	Intars Oliņš; Dins Pētersons	Andris Borģis-Vernušs	LMCC 2005 (7th)
2005–06	Ansis Regža	Uldis Vrubļevskis	Jānis Bāliņš	Аndris Borģis- Vernušs	Aivars Purmalis	Dins Pētersons	LMCC 2006 (5th)
2006–07	Ansis Regža	Aivars Gavars	Renārs Freidensons	Edgars Mucenieks			LMCC 2007 (6th)
2007–08	Ansis Regža	Renārs Freidensons	Aivars Gavars	Edgars Mucenieks			LMCC 2008 (silver)
2008–09	Ansis Regža	Renārs Freidensons	Aivars Gavars	Edgars Mucenieks	Aivars Purmalis		LMCC 2009 (bronze)
2009–10	Ansis Regža	Renārs Freidensons	Edgars Mucenieks	Aivars Purmalis	Aivars Gavars		LMCC 2010 (silver)
2010–11	Ansis Regža	Renārs Freidensons	Edgars Mucenieks	Aivars Purmalis			LMCC 2011 (silver)
2011–12	Aldis Abrickis (fourth)	Ansis Regža (skip)	Arnis Veidemanis	Jānis Puls	Einārs Vilcāns		LMCC 2012 (silver)
2012–13	Ansis Regža	Ainārs Gulbis	Gints Caune	Aivars Purmalis			LMCC 2013 (bronze)
2013–14	Ansis Regža	Renārs Freidensons	Edgars Mucenieks	Aivars Purmalis			LMCC 2014 (7th)
2014–15	Ansis Regža	Pēteris Šveisbergs	Aivars Purmalis	Aivars Gulbis	Ivars Cernajs	Dace Regža (LMCC)	LMCC 2015 (4th); WSCC 2015 (20th)
2015–16	Ansis Regža	Pēteris Šveisbergs	Aivars Purmalis	Aivars Gulbis	Aivars Lācis	Dace Regža	WSCC 2016 (13th)
2016–17	Ansis Regža	Pēteris Šveisbergs	Aivars Purmalis	Aivars Gulbis	Einārs Vilcāns		LMCC 2017 (7th)
2018–19	Ansis Regža	Renārs Freidensons	Edgars Mucenieks	Rihards Jeske			LMCC 2019 (silver)
2018–19	Ansis Regža	Janis Redlihs	Aivars Purmalis	Aivars Gulbis		Dace Regža	WSCC 2019 (13th)
2019–20	Ansis Regža	Jānis Rēdlihs	Aivars Purmalis	Aivars Gulbis		Dace Regža	LMCC 2020 (silver)
2020–21	Ansis Regža	Jānis Rēdlihs	Aivars Purmalis	Aivars Gulbis		Dace Regža	LMCC 2021 (silver)
2021–22	Ansis Regža	Janis Redlihs	Aivars Purmalis	Aivars Gulbis	Dzintars Bērziņš		WSCC 2022 (13th)

=== Mixed ===
Season	Skip	Third	Second	Lead	Alternate	Events
2003–04	Ansis Regža	Evita Regža	Āris Cēders	Dace Regža	Anete Zābere	LMxCC 2004 (bronze)
2004–05	Ansis Regža	Evita Regža	Uldis Vrubļevskis	Dace Regža		LMxCC 2005 (6th)
2005–06	Dace Regža	Aivars Gavars	Evita Regža	Ansis Regža		LMxCC 2006 (4th)
2006–07	Ansis Regža	Evita Regža	Aivars Gavars	Dace Regža	Anete Zābere	LMxCC 2007 (silver)
2007–08	Ansis Regža	Anete Zābere	Aivars Gavars	Dace Regža	Evita Regža	LMxCC 2008 (silver)
2008–09	Ansis Regža	Evita Regža	Aivars Gavars	Dace Regža	Anete Zābere	LMxCC 2009 (silver)
2009–10	Ansis Regža	Dace Regža	Aivars Gavars	Anete Zābere		LMxCC 2010 (7th)
2010–11	Ansis Regža	Evita Regža	Renārs Freidensons	Dace Regža		LMxCC 2011 (gold)
2011–12	Ansis Regža	Evita Regža	Renārs Freidensons	Dace Regža		EMxCC 2011 (12th); LMxCC 2012 (silver)
2012–13	Ansis Regža	Evita Regža	Renārs Freidensons	Dace Regža		EMxCC 2012 (13th); LMxCC 2013 (silver)
2013–14	Ansis Regža	Evita Regža	Renārs Freidensons	Dace Regža		LMxCC 2014 (5th)
2014–15	Ansis Regža	Dace Regža	Aivars Purmalis	Maija Prozorovica		LMxCC 2015 (6th)
2015–16	Ansis Regža	Dace Regža	Aivars Gavars	Antra Zvane		LMxCC 2016 (gold)
2016–17	Ansis Regža	Dace Regža	Aivars Gavars	Antra Zvane		WMxCC 2016 (20th); LMxCC 2017 (silver)
2017–18	Ansis Regža	Dace Regža	Aivars Gavars	Antra Zvane		LMxCC 2018 (gold)
2018–19	Ansis Regža	Evita Regža	Ainārs Gulbis	Kristīne Gulbe		LMxCC 2019 (silver)
2020–21	Ansis Regža	Dace Regža	Aivars Purmalis	Dace Zīle		LMxCC 2021 (4th)

=== Mixed doubles ===
Season	Female	Male	Coach	Events
2017–18	Ansis Regža	Dace Regža		LMDCC 2017 (bronze)
2018–19	Ansis Regža	Dace Regža		LMDCC 2018 (4th)
2007–08	Ansis Regža	Dace Regža		LMDCC 2008 (silver)
2009–10	Ansis Regža	Dace Regža		LMDCC 2009 (gold); WMDCC 2010 (16th)
2010–11	Ansis Regža	Dace Regža		LMDCC 2010 (bronze)
2011–12	Ansis Regža	Dace Regža		LMDCC 2011 (bronze); WMDCC 2012 (11th)
2012–13	Ansis Regža	Dace Regža		LMDCC 2012 (silver)
2013–14	Ansis Regža	Dace Regža	Aivars Purmalis	LMDCC 2013 (gold); WMDCC 2014 (17th)
2014–15	Ansis Regža	Dace Regža		LMDCC 2014 (bronze)
2015–16	Ansis Regža	Dace Regža		LMDCC 2015 (4th)
2016–17	Ansis Regža	Dace Regža		LMDCC 2016 (8th)
2017–18	Ansis Regža	Dace Regža		LMDCC 2017 (bronze)
2018–19	Ansis Regža	Dace Regža		LMDCC 2018 (4th)
2019–20	Ansis Regža	Dace Regža		LMDCC 2020 (silver)
2020–21	Ansis Regža	Dace Regža		LMDCC 2021 (silver)
2021–22	Ansis Regža	Dace Regža		LMDCC 2022 (bronze)
2022–23	Ansis Regža	Evita Regža		
2022–23	Ansis Regža	Dace Regža		LMDCC 2023 (6th)
2023–24	Ansis Regža	Dace Regža		LMDCC 2024 (gold)

== Record as a coach of national teams ==
Year	Tournament, event	National team	Place
2007	2007 European Curling Championships	Latvia (women)	19
2010	2010 European Curling Championships	Latvia (women)	8
2013	2013 European Curling Championships	Latvia (women)	7
2014	2014 World Women's Curling Championship	Latvia (women)	12
2014	2014 World Senior Curling Championships	Latvia (senior men)	13
2015	2015 European Curling Championships	Latvia (women)	13
2016	2016 World Senior Curling Championships	Latvia (senior women)	10
2018	2018 World Senior Curling Championships	Latvia (senior women)	9
2018	2018 European Curling Championships	Latvia (women)	14
2019	2019 European Curling Championships	Lithuania (women)	20
2019	2019 World Senior Curling Championships	Latvia (senior women)	8
2022	2022 World Senior Curling Championships	Latvia (senior women)	8

== Personal life ==
He is from family of Latvian curlers. His wife Dace is also a curler and curling coach. Their daughters, Evita Regža and Anete Zābere also are curlers.
