= Kārlis Smilga =

Latvian curler

Kārlis Smilga (born 13 September 1975) is a Latvian curler from Jelgava. He was skip of the Latvian men's team at the 2004, 2006 and 2017 European Curling Championships where Latvia finished 19th,17th and 18th, respectively. The 2005 he skipped a mixed curling team to that year's European Mixed Championship where Latvia finished 13th, he qualified also for 2007, 2009 and 2014 European Mixed championships. Since May, 2006, he has been president of the Latvian Curling Association (till 2010).
