= Ieva Krusta =

Latvian curler (born 1976)

- Curler
- Born: Ieva Pikšena; 8 August 1976 (age 50)

Team
- Skip: Evelīna Barone
- Third: Santa Blumberga
- Second: Ieva Rudzīte
- Lead: Ieva Krusta
- Alternate: Tīna Siliņa

Curling career
- Member Association: Latvia
- World Championship: 3 (2010, 2013, 2019)
- European Championship: 10 (2002, 2003, 2005, 2008, 2009, 2012, 2016, 2017, 2018, 2019)

Ieva Krusta (born 8 August 1976 as Ieva Pikšena) is a Latvian curler. She is currently the lead on the Latvian National Women's Curling Team.

== Career ==
Krusta was the second for the Latvian team at the 2010 Ford World Women's Curling Championship in Swift Current, Canada. The team finished in last with a 1–10 record. She also represented Latvia at the 2013 World Women's Curling Championship at home in Riga, Latvia, finishing again in the last place with a 1–10 record. The team qualified for the 2019 World Women's Curling Championship after posting an impressive 4–5 record at the 2018 European Curling Championships which included defeating higher-ranked Scotland's Eve Muirhead. The team did not have the same success at the World's as they did at the Europeans, finishing once again in last with a 1–11 record.

She currently serves as one of the coaches of the Latvian junior women's team.
