= Iveta Staša-Šaršūne =

Latvian curler (born 1976)

- Curler
- Born: Iveta Staša; 9 June 1976 (age 50); Riga, Latvia

Curling career
- World Championship: 3 (2010, 2013, 2019)
- World Mixed Doubles Championship: 2 (2008, 2009)
- European Championship: 11 (2002, 2003, 2005, 2008, 2009, 2012, 2014, 2016, 2017, 2018, 2019)

Iveta Staša-Šaršūne (born 9 June 1976) is a Latvian curler from Riga, Latvia.

== Career ==
Staša-Šaršūne skipped the Latvian team at three World Women's Curling Championships. At the 2010 Ford World Women's Curling Championship in Swift Current, Canada, her team placed last with a 1-10 record. At the 2013 World Women's Curling Championship at home in Riga, Latvia, she did not improve her ranking, placing last once again with the same record as in 2010. In 2019, she placed last once again, this time with a 1-11 record at the 2019 World Women's Curling Championship in Silkeborg, Denmark. Her best finish at the European Curling Championships was in 2018 in Tallinn, Estonia where her team placed fifth with a 4-5 record, including defeating higher-ranked Scotland and Eve Muirhead.

She is currently one of the coaches of the Latvian women's junior team.
