= 2013 European Curling Championships – Women's tournament =

2013 European Curling Championships Women's tournament
- Host city: Stavanger, Norway
- Arena: Sørmarka Arena
- Dates: November 22–30
- Winner: Sweden
- Curling club: Skellefteå CK, Skellefteå
- Skip: Margaretha Sigfridsson
- Fourth: Maria Prytz
- Third: Christina Bertrup
- Second: Maria Wennerström
- Alternate: Agnes Knochenhauer
- Finalist: Scotland (Eve Muirhead)

The women's tournament of the 2013 European Curling Championships will be held from November 22 to 30 at the Sørmarka Arena in Stavanger, Norway. The winners of the Group C tournament in Tårnby, Denmark will move on to the Group B tournament. The top eight women's teams at the 2013 European Curling Championships will represent their respective nations at the 2014 Ford World Women's Curling Championship in Saint John, New Brunswick, Canada.

== Group A ==
=== Teams ===
The teams are listed as follows:

Czech Republic	Denmark	Germany	Italy	Latvia
Skip: Anna Kubešková; Third: Tereza Plíšková; Second: Martina Strnadová; Lead: Klára Svatoňová; Alternate: Veronika Herdová	Skip: Lene Nielsen Third: Helle Simonsen; Second: Jeanne Ellegaard; Lead: Maria Poulsen; Alternate: Mette de Neergaard	Skip: Andrea Schöpp; Third: Imogen Oona Lehmann; Second: Corinna Scholz; Lead: Stella Heiß; Alternate: Nicole Muskatewitz	Skip: Veronica Zappone; Third: Sara Levetti; Second: Elisa Patono; Lead: Arianna Losano; Alternate: Martina Bronsino	Skip: Evita Regža; Third: Dace Regža; Second: Ieva Bērziņa; Lead: Žaklīna Litauniece; Alternate: Iluta Linde
Norway	Russia	Scotland	Sweden	Switzerland
Skip: Marianne Rørvik; Third: Anneline Skårsmoen; Second: Camilla Holth; Lead: Julie Kjær Molnar; Alternate: Pia Trulsen	Skip: Anna Sidorova; Third: Margarita Fomina; Second: Alexandra Saitova; Lead: Ekaterina Galkina; Alternate: Nkeiruka Ezekh	Skip: Eve Muirhead; Third: Anna Sloan; Second: Vicki Adams; Lead: Claire Hamilton; Alternate: Lauren Gray	Fourth: Maria Prytz; Third: Christina Bertrup; Second: Maria Wennerström; Skip: Margaretha Sigfridsson; Alternate: Agnes Knochenhauer	Skip: Mirjam Ott; Third: Carmen Schäfer; Second: Carmen Küng; Lead: Janine Greiner; Alternate: Alina Pätz

=== Round-robin standings ===
Final round-robin standings

Key
Teams to Playoffs
Teams to Tiebreakers
Teams relegated to 2014 Group B

Country	Skip	W	L	PF	PA	Ends Won	Ends Lost	Blank Ends	Stolen Ends	Shot Pct.
Scotland	Eve Muirhead	9	0	91	37	42	27	3	15	83%
Switzerland	Mirjam Ott	7	2	65	42	42	28	7	18	79%
Sweden	Margaretha Sigfridsson	6	3	64	46	40	31	10	14	78%
Denmark	Lene Nielsen	6	3	59	49	41	31	3	19	76%
Russia	Anna Sidorova	6	3	72	47	36	32	9	9	79%
Czech Republic	Anna Kubešková	4	5	58	66	34	39	7	8	71%
Latvia	Evita Regža	3	6	48	74	32	40	7	7	66%
Germany	Andrea Schöpp	2	7	51	59	36	37	10	11	71%
Norway	Marianne Rørvik	1	8	44	80	27	46	2	6	66%
Italy	Veronica Zappone	1	8	35	87	26	45	2	6	62%

Sweden won the draw-to-the-button challenge and were given the third seed. Russia and Denmark will play a tiebreaker game for the fourth seed.

=== Round-robin results ===
==== Draw 1 ====
Saturday, November 23, 14:30

Sheet A	1	2	3	4	5	6	7	8	9	10	Final
Scotland (Muirhead) 🔨	0	1	1	2	0	6	0	1	X	X	11
Russia (Sidorova)	1	0	0	0	2	0	2	0	X	X	5

Sheet B	1	2	3	4	5	6	7	8	9	10	Final
Norway (Rørvik) 🔨	1	2	3	0	4	0	0	1	1	X	12
Italy (Zappone)	0	0	0	2	0	1	1	0	0	X	4

Sheet C	1	2	3	4	5	6	7	8	9	10	Final
Switzerland (Ott)	0	0	2	2	2	0	0	1	0	1	8
Denmark (Nielsen) 🔨	0	1	0	0	0	2	1	0	1	0	5

Sheet D	1	2	3	4	5	6	7	8	9	10	Final
Sweden (Sigfridsson)	1	1	1	2	0	0	3	2	X	X	10
Czech Republic (Kubešková) 🔨	0	0	0	0	2	1	0	0	X	X	3

Sheet E	1	2	3	4	5	6	7	8	9	10	11	Final
Latvia (Regža)	0	0	1	0	1	0	0	2	1	0	1	6
Germany (Schöpp) 🔨	0	1	0	1	0	0	1	0	0	2	0	5

==== Draw 2 ====
Sunday, November 24, 8:00

Sheet A	1	2	3	4	5	6	7	8	9	10	Final
Italy (Zappone)	0	0	2	0	1	0	1	0	1	0	5
Sweden (Sigfridsson) 🔨	0	2	0	3	0	1	0	1	0	1	8

Sheet B	1	2	3	4	5	6	7	8	9	10	Final
Russia (Sidorova) 🔨	0	2	0	2	0	1	0	1	0	0	6
Czech Republic (Kubešková)	0	0	3	0	1	0	2	0	1	3	10

Sheet C	1	2	3	4	5	6	7	8	9	10	Final
Latvia (Regža) 🔨	0	2	1	0	1	0	0	1	0	X	5
Scotland (Muirhead)	0	0	0	5	0	2	1	0	4	X	12

Sheet D	1	2	3	4	5	6	7	8	9	10	Final
Germany (Schöpp)	1	0	3	0	0	0	0	1	0	X	5
Denmark (Nielsen) 🔨	0	1	0	1	1	1	3	0	2	X	9

Sheet E	1	2	3	4	5	6	7	8	9	10	Final
Norway (Rørvik)	0	0	1	0	0	0	1	0	X	X	2
Switzerland (Ott) 🔨	2	1	0	1	1	1	0	1	X	X	7

==== Draw 3 ====
Sunday, November 24, 16:00

Sheet A	1	2	3	4	5	6	7	8	9	10	Final
Denmark (Nielsen)	1	2	1	1	0	4	X	X	X	X	9
Norway (Rørvik) 🔨	0	0	0	0	2	0	X	X	X	X	2

Sheet B	1	2	3	4	5	6	7	8	9	10	Final
Scotland (Muirhead) 🔨	0	2	0	2	0	2	0	0	0	1	7
Germany (Schöpp)	1	0	2	0	1	0	1	1	0	0	6

Sheet C	1	2	3	4	5	6	7	8	9	10	Final
Russia (Sidorova)	0	0	2	0	2	0	4	0	1	X	9
Sweden (Sigfridsson) 🔨	0	1	0	1	0	1	0	1	0	X	4

Sheet D	1	2	3	4	5	6	7	8	9	10	Final
Switzerland (Ott) 🔨	2	1	0	0	1	0	1	1	0	3	9
Latvia (Regža)	0	0	1	2	0	1	0	0	3	0	7

Sheet E	1	2	3	4	5	6	7	8	9	10	Final
Italy (Zappone)	0	1	2	1	3	1	0	1	X	X	9
Czech Republic (Kubešková) 🔨	1	0	0	0	0	0	1	0	X	X	2

==== Draw 4 ====
Monday, November 25, 9:00

Sheet A	1	2	3	4	5	6	7	8	9	10	Final
Czech Republic (Kubešková) 🔨	1	0	0	0	3	3	4	X	X	X	11
Latvia (Regža)	0	1	0	0	0	0	0	X	X	X	1

Sheet B	1	2	3	4	5	6	7	8	9	10	Final
Switzerland (Ott) 🔨	0	0	2	0	0	2	0	2	1	X	7
Sweden (Sigfridsson)	0	1	0	1	0	0	1	0	0	X	3

Sheet C	1	2	3	4	5	6	7	8	9	10	Final
Germany (Schöpp) 🔨	1	1	2	2	1	0	2	5	X	X	14
Italy (Zappone)	0	0	0	0	0	2	0	0	X	X	2

Sheet D	1	2	3	4	5	6	7	8	9	10	Final
Denmark (Nielsen)	0	0	0	1	0	0	X	X	X	X	1
Scotland (Muirhead) 🔨	3	2	3	0	1	1	X	X	X	X	10

Sheet E	1	2	3	4	5	6	7	8	9	10	Final
Russia (Sidorova) 🔨	2	0	1	2	3	0	4	X	X	X	12
Norway (Rørvik)	0	2	0	0	0	1	0	X	X	X	3

==== Draw 5 ====
Monday, November 25, 19:00

Sheet A	1	2	3	4	5	6	7	8	9	10	Final
Switzerland (Ott) 🔨	2	0	1	1	1	2	3	X	X	X	10
Italy (Zappone)	0	1	0	0	0	0	0	X	X	X	1

Sheet B	1	2	3	4	5	6	7	8	9	10	Final
Latvia (Regža)	0	0	0	2	0	0	X	X	X	X	2
Russia (Sidorova) 🔨	4	1	1	0	4	0	X	X	X	X	10

Sheet C	1	2	3	4	5	6	7	8	9	10	Final
Scotland (Muirhead) 🔨	5	0	0	2	0	1	0	2	0	0	10
Czech Republic (Kubešková)	0	2	0	0	2	0	2	0	2	1	9

Sheet D	1	2	3	4	5	6	7	8	9	10	Final
Norway (Rørvik)	0	0	2	0	2	0	1	0	0	X	5
Germany (Schöpp) 🔨	1	1	0	2	0	2	0	1	1	X	8

Sheet E	1	2	3	4	5	6	7	8	9	10	Final
Sweden (Sigfridsson)	0	0	1	2	0	2	1	0	0	X	6
Denmark (Nielsen) 🔨	0	1	0	0	1	0	0	1	1	X	4

==== Draw 6 ====
Tuesday, November 26, 12:00

Sheet A	1	2	3	4	5	6	7	8	9	10	Final
Latvia (Regža) 🔨	0	1	1	0	0	1	0	1	2	0	6
Denmark (Nielsen)	1	0	0	2	2	0	2	0	0	1	8

Sheet B	1	2	3	4	5	6	7	8	9	10	Final
Italy (Zappone)	0	0	1	0	0	1	X	X	X	X	2
Scotland (Muirhead) 🔨	5	2	0	3	2	0	X	X	X	X	12

Sheet C	1	2	3	4	5	6	7	8	9	10	Final
Sweden (Sigfridsson) 🔨	3	0	2	2	0	0	1	2	3	X	13
Norway (Rørvik)	0	1	0	0	3	2	0	0	0	X	6

Sheet D	1	2	3	4	5	6	7	8	9	10	Final
Czech Republic (Kubešková) 🔨	1	0	0	1	0	0	1	0	X	X	3
Switzerland (Ott)	0	2	2	0	2	2	0	1	X	X	9

Sheet E	1	2	3	4	5	6	7	8	9	10	Final
Germany (Schöpp)	0	0	0	1	0	1	0	0	X	X	2
Russia (Sidorova) 🔨	1	2	1	0	2	0	0	2	X	X	8

==== Draw 7 ====
Tuesday, November 26, 20:00

Sheet A	1	2	3	4	5	6	7	8	9	10	11	Final
Norway (Rørvik) 🔨	1	0	0	1	4	0	0	0	1	0	0	7
Czech Republic (Kubešková)	0	0	1	0	0	2	0	1	0	3	1	8

Sheet B	1	2	3	4	5	6	7	8	9	10	Final
Germany (Schöpp)	0	0	1	0	0	0	1	0	X	X	2
Switzerland (Ott) 🔨	2	1	0	2	2	1	0	0	X	X	8

Sheet C	1	2	3	4	5	6	7	8	9	10	Final
Denmark (Nielsen)	1	0	1	1	0	1	0	1	0	1	6
Russia (Sidorova) 🔨	0	0	0	0	1	0	2	0	2	0	5

Sheet D	1	2	3	4	5	6	7	8	9	10	Final
Latvia (Regža) 🔨	2	0	3	3	1	0	1	0	1	X	11
Italy (Zappone)	0	1	0	0	0	2	0	2	0	X	5

Sheet E	1	2	3	4	5	6	7	8	9	10	Final
Scotland (Muirhead) 🔨	1	0	1	0	1	0	1	0	1	1	6
Sweden (Sigfridsson)	0	1	0	1	0	1	0	2	0	0	5

==== Draw 8 ====
Wednesday, November 27, 14:00

Sheet A	1	2	3	4	5	6	7	8	9	10	Final
Russia (Sidorova) 🔨	0	0	2	0	0	0	2	1	0	1	6
Switzerland (Ott)	0	0	0	0	1	2	0	0	1	0	4

Sheet B	1	2	3	4	5	6	7	8	9	10	Final
Sweden (Sigfridsson) 🔨	1	0	0	1	1	3	2	X	X	X	8
Latvia (Regža)	0	0	1	0	0	0	0	X	X	X	1

Sheet C	1	2	3	4	5	6	7	8	9	10	Final
Czech Republic (Kubešková) 🔨	0	0	1	0	2	0	1	2	0	1	7
Germany (Schöpp)	0	1	0	1	0	1	0	0	1	0	4

Sheet D	1	2	3	4	5	6	7	8	9	10	Final
Scotland (Muirhead)	2	2	3	0	2	1	X	X	X	X	10
Norway (Rørvik) 🔨	0	0	0	1	0	0	X	X	X	X	1

Sheet E	1	2	3	4	5	6	7	8	9	10	Final
Denmark (Nielsen) 🔨	1	1	1	2	0	1	0	X	X	X	7
Italy (Zappone)	0	0	0	0	1	0	1	X	X	X	2

==== Draw 9 ====
Thursday, November 28, 8:00

Sheet A	1	2	3	4	5	6	7	8	9	10	Final
Sweden (Sigfridsson) 🔨	2	0	0	2	0	3	0	0	0	0	7
Germany (Schöpp)	0	1	0	0	2	0	2	0	0	0	5

Sheet B	1	2	3	4	5	6	7	8	9	10	Final
Czech Republic (Kubešková)	0	0	0	2	0	2	0	1	X	X	5
Denmark (Nielsen) 🔨	1	1	2	0	3	0	3	0	X	X	10

Sheet C	1	2	3	4	5	6	7	8	9	10	Final
Norway (Rørvik) 🔨	0	1	1	0	1	0	1	0	2	0	6
Latvia (Regža)	1	0	0	1	0	1	0	2	0	4	9

Sheet D	1	2	3	4	5	6	7	8	9	10	Final
Italy (Zappone) 🔨	1	0	1	0	0	2	0	1	0	X	5
Russia (Sidorova)	0	1	0	3	1	0	0	0	6	X	11

Sheet E	1	2	3	4	5	6	7	8	9	10	Final
Switzerland (Ott) 🔨	0	2	0	0	0	1	0	X	X	X	3
Scotland (Muirhead)	2	0	3	1	2	0	5	X	X	X	13

=== World Challenge Games ===
The winner of the best-of-three series between the eighth placed team in Group A and the winner of Group B goes to the 2014 Ford World Women's Curling Championship.

==== Challenge 1 ====
Friday, November 29, 20:00

Sheet A	1	2	3	4	5	6	7	8	9	10	Final
Germany (Schöpp)	0	0	0	2	0	0	0	2	0	0	4
Finland (Puustinen) 🔨	0	0	0	0	1	2	1	0	0	1	5

==== Challenge 2 ====
Saturday, November 30, 10:00

Team	1	2	3	4	5	6	7	8	9	10	Final
Germany (Schöpp) 🔨	1	0	2	0	0	0	0	2	1	X	6
Finland (Puustinen)	0	0	0	0	2	1	0	0	0	X	3

==== Challenge 3 ====
Saturday, November 30, 15:00

Team	1	2	3	4	5	6	7	8	9	10	Final
Germany (Schöpp) 🔨	1	0	0	1	1	1	1	1	0	X	6
Finland (Puustinen)	0	1	1	0	0	0	0	0	1	X	3

Germany advances to the 2014 Ford World Women's Curling Championship.

=== Tiebreaker ===
Thursday, November 28, 15:00

Sheet A	1	2	3	4	5	6	7	8	9	10	Final
Russia (Sidorova)	0	2	0	0	0	0	0	1	0	X	3
Denmark (Nielsen) 🔨	1	0	1	1	0	1	1	0	2	X	7

Player percentages
Russia		Denmark	
Ekaterina Galkina	84%	Maria Poulsen	81%
Alexandra Saitova	81%	Jeanne Ellegaard	88%
Margarita Fomina	84%	Helle Simonsen	74%
Anna Sidorova	64%	Lene Nielsen	67%
Total	79%	Total	77%

=== Playoffs ===
Page playoff system
1	Scotland	10
2	Switzerland	3
3	Sweden	10
4	Denmark	2

Semifinal
2	Switzerland	6
3	Sweden	7

Final
1	Scotland	5
3	Sweden	10

Bronze-medal game
2	Switzerland	6
4	Denmark	4

==== 1 vs. 2 ====
Friday, November 29, 13:00

Sheet A	1	2	3	4	5	6	7	8	9	10	Final
Scotland (Muirhead) 🔨	1	0	0	2	3	0	4	0	X	X	10
Switzerland (Ott)	0	1	0	0	0	1	0	1	X	X	3

Player percentages
Scotland		Switzerland	
Claire Hamilton	91%	Janine Greiner	86%
Vicki Adams	77%	Carmen Küng	69%
Anna Sloan	69%	Carmen Schäfer	73%
Eve Muirhead	93%	Mirjam Ott	75%
Total	82%	Total	76%

==== 3 vs. 4 ====
Friday, November 29, 13:00

Sheet D	1	2	3	4	5	6	7	8	9	10	Final
Sweden (Sigfridsson) 🔨	0	2	0	0	3	2	0	3	X	X	10
Denmark (Nielsen)	0	0	0	1	0	0	1	0	X	X	2

Player percentages
Sweden		Denmark	
Margaretha Sigfridsson	86%	Maria Poulsen	80%
Maria Wennerström	70%	Jeanne Ellegaard	88%
Christina Bertrup	77%	Helle Simonsen	84%
Maria Prytz	95%	Lene Nielsen	69%
Total	82%	Total	80%

==== Semifinal ====
Friday, November 29, 20:00

Sheet B	1	2	3	4	5	6	7	8	9	10	Final
Switzerland (Ott) 🔨	1	0	0	0	1	0	2	0	1	1	6
Sweden (Sigfridsson)	0	0	2	1	0	1	0	3	0	0	7

Player percentages
Switzerland		Sweden	
Janine Greiner	91%	Margaretha Sigfridsson	90%
Carmen Küng	78%	Maria Wennerström	76%
Carmen Schäfer	78%	Christina Bertrup	79%
Mirjam Ott	79%	Maria Prytz	85%
Total	81%	Total	83%

===== Bronze-medal game =====
Saturday, November 30, 10:00

Sheet C	1	2	3	4	5	6	7	8	9	10	Final
Switzerland (Ott) 🔨	0	2	0	0	2	1	0	0	1	X	6
Denmark (Nielsen)	1	0	0	1	0	0	2	0	0	X	4

Player percentages
Switzerland		Denmark	
Janine Greiner	86%	Maria Poulsen	85%
Alina Pätz	86%	Jeanne Ellegaard	73%
Carmen Schäfer	88%	Helle Simonsen	73%
Mirjam Ott	81%	Lene Nielsen	80%
Total	85%	Total	78%

==== Final ====
Saturday, November 30, 10:00

Sheet D	1	2	3	4	5	6	7	8	9	10	Final
Scotland (Muirhead)🔨	0	1	0	0	2	1	0	1	0	0	5
Sweden (Sigfridsson)	1	0	3	0	0	0	2	0	1	3	10

Player percentages
Scotland		Sweden	
Claire Hamilton	81%	Margaretha Sigfridsson	88%
Vicki Adams	75%	Maria Wennerström	75%
Anna Sloan	75%	Christina Bertrup	79%
Eve Muirhead	69%	Maria Prytz	74%
Total	75%	Total	79%

=== Player percentages ===
Round Robin only

Leads	%
(Switzerland) Janine Greiner	89
(Sweden) Margaretha Sigfridsson	85
(Russia) Ekaterina Galkina	84
(Scotland) Claire Hamilton	83
(Denmark) Maria Poulsen	81

Seconds	%
(Scotland) Vicki Adams	84
(Russia) Alexandra Saitova	78
(Denmark) Jeanne Ellegaard	78
(Switzerland) Carmen Küng	78
(Germany) Nicole Muskatewitz	76

Thirds	%
(Scotland) Anna Sloan	81
(Russia) Margarita Fomina	79
(Switzerland) Carmen Schäfer	78
(Sweden) Christina Bertrup	77
(Germany) Imogen Oona Lehmann	73

Skips/Fourths	%
(Scotland) Eve Muirhead	83
(Russia) Anna Sidorova	76
(Sweden) Maria Prytz	76
(Switzerland) Mirjam Ott	75
(Denmark) Lene Nielsen	74

== Group B ==
=== Teams ===
The teams are listed as follows:

Austria	Belarus	England	Estonia	Finland
Skip: Constanze Hummelt; Third: Andrea Höfler; Second: Anna Weghuber; Lead: Marijke Reitsma; Alternate: Tina Sauerstein	Skip: Alina Pavlyuchik; Third: Natalia Sverzhinskaya; Second: Evgeniya Orlis; Lead: Ekaterina Kirillova; Alternate: Arina Sverzhinskaya	Skip: Anna Fowler; Third: Hetty Garnier; Second: Naomi Robinson; Lead: Lauren Pearce; Alternate: Lucinda Sparks	Skip: Maile Mölder; Third: Kristiine Lill; Second: Küllike Ustav; Lead: Kaja Liik-Tamm; Alternate: Helen Nummert	Skip: Sanna Puustinen; Third: Oona Kauste; Second: Heidi Hossi; Lead: Marjo Hippi; Alternate: Maija Salmiovirta
Hungary	Poland	Slovenia	Spain	Turkey
Skip: Ildikó Szekeres; Third: Ágnes Patonai; Second: Blanka Páthy-Denscő; Lead: Ágnes Szentannai; Alternate: Alexandra Béres	Skip: Elżbieta Ran; Third: Magda Strączek; Second: Magdalena Dumanowska; Lead: Agata Musik; Alternate: Joanna Waryszak	Skip: Valentina Jurinčič; Third: Anja Kresnik; Second: Tjaša Jazbec; Lead: Petra Klemenc	Skip: Irantzu García; Third: Oihane Otaegi; Second: Estrella Labrador; Lead: María Fernández; Alternate: Itziar Ortiz de Urbina	Skip: Elif Kızılkaya; Third: Dilşat Yıldız; Second: Ayşe Gözütok; Lead: Ozlem Polat; Alternate: Öznur Polat

=== Round-robin standings ===
Final round-robin standings

Key
Teams to Playoffs
Teams to Tiebreakers
Countries relegated to 2013 Group C

Country	Skip	W	L
Estonia	Maile Mölder	7	2
Finland	Sanna Puustinen	7	2
England	Anna Fowler	6	3
Austria	Constanze Hummelt	5	4
Turkey	Elif Kızılkaya	5	4
Hungary	Ildikó Szekeres	5	4
Belarus	Alina Pavlyuchik	3	6
Poland	Elżbieta Ran	3	6
Spain	Irantzu García	2	7
Slovenia	Valentina Jurinčič	2	7

=== Round-robin results ===
==== Draw 1 ====
Saturday, November 23, 8:00

Sheet F	1	2	3	4	5	6	7	8	9	10	Final
Spain (García)	0	3	0	0	1	0	0	1	0	3	8
Belarus (Pavlyuchik) 🔨	1	0	1	0	0	1	1	0	3	0	7

Sheet G	1	2	3	4	5	6	7	8	9	10	Final
Hungary (Szekeres) 🔨	0	3	0	0	3	0	0	1	5	X	12
Poland (Ran)	0	0	2	2	0	2	0	0	0	X	6

Sheet H	1	2	3	4	5	6	7	8	9	10	Final
Finland (Puustinen)	0	0	0	1	1	0	0	2	0	X	4
Estonia (Mölder) 🔨	0	2	2	0	0	2	1	0	2	X	9

Sheet J	1	2	3	4	5	6	7	8	9	10	Final
Austria (Hummelt) 🔨	0	1	0	2	0	0	0	2	2	0	7
Turkey (Kızılkaya)	1	0	1	0	2	0	2	0	0	2	8

Sheet L	1	2	3	4	5	6	7	8	9	10	Final
England (Fowler)	5	0	4	4	2	0	X	X	X	X	15
Slovenia (Jurincic)	0	2	0	0	0	1	X	X	X	X	3

==== Draw 2 ====
Saturday, November 23, 19:30

Sheet F	1	2	3	4	5	6	7	8	9	10	Final
Hungary (Szekeres)	0	1	0	1	1	0	1	0	0	X	4
Austria (Hummelt) 🔨	1	0	2	0	0	1	0	2	2	X	8

Sheet H	1	2	3	4	5	6	7	8	9	10	Final
England (Fowler)🔨	2	4	0	2	0	0	2	X	X	X	10
Belarus (Pavlyuchik)	0	0	1	0	1	2	0	X	X	X	4

Sheet J	1	2	3	4	5	6	7	8	9	10	Final
Slovenia (Jurincic) 🔨	0	0	0	1	0	1	X	X	X	X	2
Finland (Puustinen)	4	5	1	0	2	0	X	X	X	X	12

Sheet K	1	2	3	4	5	6	7	8	9	10	Final
Spain (García) 🔨	0	1	0	0	1	2	0	1	1	0	6
Turkey (Kızılkaya)	0	0	3	3	0	0	2	0	0	1	9

Sheet L	1	2	3	4	5	6	7	8	9	10	Final
Estonia (Mölder) 🔨	1	0	0	1	0	2	0	2	0	2	8
Poland (Ran)	0	0	2	0	1	0	1	0	1	0	5

==== Draw 3 ====
Sunday, November 24, 12:00

Sheet F	1	2	3	4	5	6	7	8	9	10	Final
Estonia (Mölder) 🔨	3	1	3	0	5	1	X	X	X	X	13
Slovenia (Jurincic)	0	0	0	1	0	0	X	X	X	X	1

Sheet G	1	2	3	4	5	6	7	8	9	10	Final
Turkey (Kızılkaya) 🔨	2	0	1	0	1	1	0	0	0	1	6
Belarus (Pavlyuchik)	0	1	0	1	0	0	2	1	2	0	7

Sheet H	1	2	3	4	5	6	7	8	9	10	Final
Spain (García) 🔨	0	0	0	1	0	0	0	0	0	X	1
Hungary (Szekeres)	0	0	1	0	1	0	0	1	0	X	3

Sheet J	1	2	3	4	5	6	7	8	9	10	Final
England (Fowler)	0	0	0	2	0	0	2	0	1	2	7
Poland (Ran) 🔨	1	0	1	0	1	1	0	1	0	0	5

Sheet L	1	2	3	4	5	6	7	8	9	10	Final
Austria (Hummelt)	0	0	0	1	1	0	0	2	0	0	4
Finland (Puustinen) 🔨	2	0	1	0	0	1	1	0	0	1	6

==== Draw 4 ====
Sunday, November 24, 20:00

Sheet F	1	2	3	4	5	6	7	8	9	10	11	Final
Finland (Puustinen)	2	0	0	0	0	1	0	1	2	0	2	8
Hungary (Szekeres) 🔨	0	2	1	1	0	0	1	0	0	1	0	6

Sheet G	1	2	3	4	5	6	7	8	9	10	Final
Austria (Hummelt) 🔨	0	1	0	2	0	1	0	0	2	1	7
Estonia (Mölder)	1	0	1	0	1	0	1	2	0	0	6

Sheet H	1	2	3	4	5	6	7	8	9	10	Final
Belarus (Pavlyuchik) 🔨	0	0	2	0	0	4	1	0	2	X	9
Poland (Ran)	1	1	0	0	1	0	0	1	0	X	4

Sheet K	1	2	3	4	5	6	7	8	9	10	Final
Slovenia (Jurincic)	0	0	3	1	0	2	0	1	0	1	8
Spain (García) 🔨	2	2	0	0	0	0	0	0	3	0	7

Sheet L	1	2	3	4	5	6	7	8	9	10	Final
Turkey (Kızılkaya)	0	1	0	1	1	1	2	0	1	X	7
England (Fowler) 🔨	1	0	1	0	0	0	0	2	0	X	4

==== Draw 5 ====
Monday, November 25, 12:00

Sheet F	1	2	3	4	5	6	7	8	9	10	Final
Belarus (Pavlyuchik) 🔨	1	0	1	0	0	0	3	1	0	X	6
Estonia (Mölder)	0	4	0	1	0	2	0	0	2	X	9

Sheet G	1	2	3	4	5	6	7	8	9	10	Final
Slovenia (Jurincic) 🔨	1	0	1	1	3	2	0	0	0	1	9
Hungary (Szekeres)	0	3	0	0	0	0	2	1	1	0	7

Sheet H	1	2	3	4	5	6	7	8	9	10	Final
Turkey (Kızılkaya)	0	1	0	2	0	0	1	1	0	X	5
Finland (Puustinen) 🔨	2	0	1	0	3	1	0	0	2	X	9

Sheet K	1	2	3	4	5	6	7	8	9	10	Final
England (Fowler) 🔨	1	0	2	0	1	0	0	2	0	2	8
Austria (Hummelt)	0	2	0	1	0	2	1	0	1	0	7

Sheet L	1	2	3	4	5	6	7	8	9	10	Final
Poland (Ran)	0	2	0	1	0	0	0	1	0	X	4
Spain (García) 🔨	1	0	1	0	2	0	1	0	1	X	6

==== Draw 6 ====
Monday, November 25, 20:00

Sheet G	1	2	3	4	5	6	7	8	9	10	Final
Poland (Ran) 🔨	1	0	0	0	2	3	0	2	0	X	8
Turkey (Kızılkaya)	0	0	1	1	0	0	1	0	1	X	4

Sheet H	1	2	3	4	5	6	7	8	9	10	Final
Slovenia (Jurincic)	2	0	0	2	1	0	1	1	0	0	0
Austria (Hummelt) 🔨	0	3	1	0	0	2	0	0	3	1	10

Sheet J	1	2	3	4	5	6	7	8	9	10	Final
Spain (García)	0	0	0	0	2	0	1	2	0	X	5
England (Fowler) 🔨	0	0	1	2	0	2	0	0	2	X	7

Sheet K	1	2	3	4	5	6	7	8	9	10	Final
Hungary (Szekeres)	0	0	0	1	1	0	0	0	2	X	4
Estonia (Mölder) 🔨	1	2	0	0	0	1	1	2	0	X	7

Sheet L	1	2	3	4	5	6	7	8	9	10	Final
Finland (Puustinen)	0	2	1	0	0	0	2	0	2	X	7
Belarus (Pavlyuchik) 🔨	2	0	0	1	1	0	0	1	0	X	5

==== Draw 7 ====
Tuesday, November 26, 12:00

Sheet F	1	2	3	4	5	6	7	8	9	10	11	Final
Austria (Hummelt) 🔨	1	0	0	0	2	1	0	0	0	1	0	5
Poland (Ran)	0	0	0	1	0	0	2	1	1	0	1	6

Sheet G	1	2	3	4	5	6	7	8	9	10	Final
Finland (Puustinen)	0	1	1	0	0	0	1	0	2	1	6
Spain (García) 🔨	1	0	0	1	1	0	0	2	0	0	5

Sheet H	1	2	3	4	5	6	7	8	9	10	Final
Hungary (Szekeres) 🔨	1	0	0	1	1	0	0	1	2	X	6
England (Fowler)	0	1	0	0	0	1	2	0	0	X	4

Sheet J	1	2	3	4	5	6	7	8	9	10	Final
Turkey (Kızılkaya)	0	4	0	1	0	0	0	0	0	3	8
Estonia (Mölder) 🔨	3	0	1	0	0	1	0	1	0	0	6

Sheet K	1	2	3	4	5	6	7	8	9	10	Final
Belarus (Pavlyuchik)	0	3	0	4	0	4	0	0	0	1	12
Slovenia (Jurincic) 🔨	1	0	2	0	1	0	2	1	2	0	9

==== Draw 8 ====
Tuesday, November 26, 20:00

Sheet F	1	2	3	4	5	6	7	8	9	10	Final
Slovenia (Jurincic) 🔨	0	1	2	0	0	2	0	X	X	X	5
Turkey (Kızılkaya)	5	0	0	5	3	0	1	X	X	X	14

Sheet G	1	2	3	4	5	6	7	8	9	10	Final
Estonia (Mölder)	0	1	0	3	1	0	0	0	0	2	7
England (Fowler) 🔨	1	0	1	0	0	0	1	1	2	0	6

Sheet J	1	2	3	4	5	6	7	8	9	10	Final
Belarus (Pavlyuchik)	0	1	0	1	0	1	0	2	0	X	5
Hungary (Szekeres) 🔨	1	0	3	0	1	0	1	0	2	X	8

Sheet K	1	2	3	4	5	6	7	8	9	10	Final
Poland (Ran)	0	0	0	1	0	0	X	X	X	X	1
Finland (Puustinen)	3	1	2	0	2	1	X	X	X	X	9

Sheet L	1	2	3	4	5	6	7	8	9	10	Final
Spain (García)	1	1	0	0	0	0	0	0	X	X	2
Austria (Hummelt) 🔨	0	0	1	0	2	1	3	2	X	X	9

==== Draw 9 ====
Wednesday, November 27, 12:00

Sheet F	1	2	3	4	5	6	7	8	9	10	Final
England (Fowler) 🔨	2	2	0	0	2	1	0	2	0	1	10
Finland (Puustinen)	0	0	1	1	0	0	2	0	3	0	7

Sheet H 🔨	1	2	3	4	5	6	7	8	9	10	Final
Poland (Ran) 🔨	5	2	0	2	0	0	2	0	0	X	11
Slovenia (Jurincic)	0	0	1	0	1	4	0	2	1	X	9

Sheet J	1	2	3	4	5	6	7	8	9	10	Final
Estonia (Mölder) 🔨	0	2	0	3	0	0	2	0	1	X	8
Spain (García)	0	0	1	0	1	1	0	1	0	X	4

Sheet K	1	2	3	4	5	6	7	8	9	10	Final
Austria (Hummelt) 🔨	0	2	3	0	0	0	0	2	2	X	9
Belarus (Pavlyuchik)	0	0	0	2	2	0	2	0	0	X	6

Sheet L	1	2	3	4	5	6	7	8	9	10	Final
Hungary (Szekeres) 🔨	0	1	0	2	0	3	0	0	4	X	10
Turkey (Kızılkaya)	1	0	1	0	1	0	1	2	0	X	6

=== Tiebreakers ===
Wednesday, November 27, 18:00

Sheet K	1	2	3	4	5	6	7	8	9	10	Final
Turkey (Kızılkaya)	0	0	1	1	0	0	2	3	0	X	7
Hungary (Szekeres) 🔨	2	0	0	0	1	1	0	0	1	X	5

Thursday, November 28, 8:00

Sheet L	1	2	3	4	5	6	7	8	9	10	Final
Austria (Hummelt) 🔨	1	0	2	0	3	0	2	0	2	X	10
Turkey (Kızılkaya)	0	1	0	3	0	0	0	1	0	X	5

=== Playoffs ===
Page playoff system
1	Estonia	3
2	Finland	8
3	England	12
4	Austria	7

Semifinal
2	Estonia	7
3	England	2

Final
1	Finland	9
2	Estonia	8

Bronze-medal game
3	England	7
4	Austria	5

==== 1 vs. 2 ====
Thursday, November 28, 14:00

Sheet F	1	2	3	4	5	6	7	8	9	10	Final
Estonia (Mölder) 🔨	0	1	0	1	0	0	0	1	0	X	3
Finland (Puustinen)	2	0	1	0	1	2	1	0	1	X	8

==== 3 vs. 4 ====
Thursday, November 28, 14:00

Sheet K	1	2	3	4	5	6	7	8	9	10	Final
England (Fowler)	0	3	0	2	1	0	0	3	3	X	12
Austria (Hummelt) 🔨	2	0	2	0	0	2	1	0	0	X	7

==== Semifinal ====
Thursday, November 28, 20:00

Sheet H	1	2	3	4	5	6	7	8	9	10	Final
Estonia (Mölder) 🔨	0	0	0	2	2	1	0	2	0	X	7
England (Fowler)	0	0	0	0	0	0	1	0	1	X	2

===== Bronze-medal game =====
Friday, November 29, 12:00

Sheet D	1	2	3	4	5	6	7	8	9	10	Final
England (Fowler) 🔨	0	2	1	0	2	0	1	0	0	1	7
Austria (Hummelt)	1	0	0	1	0	1	0	2	0	0	5

===== Final =====
Friday, November 29, 12:00

Sheet B	1	2	3	4	5	6	7	8	9	10	11	Final
Finland (Puustinen) 🔨	4	0	0	0	0	2	0	1	0	1	1	9
Estonia (Mölder)	0	2	1	1	0	0	0	0	4	0	0	8

== Group C ==
The four women's teams played a double round robin, and at its conclusion, the top three teams advanced to the playoffs. In the playoffs, the first and second seeds, Slovenia and Belarus played a game to determine the first team to advance to the Group B competitions. The loser of this game, Slovenia, then played a game with the third seed, Slovakia, to determine the second team to advance to the Group B competitions.

=== Teams ===
The teams are listed as follows:

Belarus	Croatia	Slovakia	Slovenia
Skip: Alina Pavlyuchik; Third: Natalia Sverzhinskaya; Second: Eugene Orlis; Lead: Ekaterina Kirillova; Alternate: Arina Sverzhinskaya	Skip: Iva Penava; Third: Iva Roso; Second: Antonia Maricevic; Lead: Lucija Fabijanic; Alternate: Anita Sajfa	Skip: Monika Kristofcakova; Third: Nina Mayerova; Second: Dominika Nitkova; Lead: Sona Mayerova; Alternate: Tereza Hubackova	Skip: Valentina Jurinčič; Third: Anja Kresnik; Second: Petra Klemenc; Lead: Tjaša Jazbec

=== Round-robin standings ===
Final round-robin standings

Key
Teams to Playoffs
Teams to Tiebreaker

Country	Skip	W	L
Slovenia	Valentina Jurinčič	5	1
Belarus	Alina Pavlyuchik	3	3
Slovakia	Monika Kristofcakova	2	4
Croatia	Iva Penava	2	4

=== Round-robin results ===
All draw times are listed in Central European Time (UTC+1).

==== Draw 1 ====
Tuesday, October 8, 12:00

Sheet B	1	2	3	4	5	6	7	8	9	10	Final
Belarus (Pavlyuchik) 🔨	0	0	0	1	1	2	0	2	0	0	6
Slovenia (Jurinčič)	0	1	1	0	0	0	3	0	1	1	7

Sheet D	1	2	3	4	5	6	7	8	9	10	Final
Croatia (Penava) 🔨	2	0	0	1	3	1	0	1	0	X	8
Slovakia (Kristofcakova)	0	2	1	0	0	0	1	0	1	X	5

==== Draw 2 ====
Tuesday, October 8, 20:00

Sheet C	1	2	3	4	5	6	7	8	9	10	Final
Slovenia (Jurinčič)	3	1	0	3	0	0	1	X	X	X	8
Slovakia (Kristofcakova) 🔨	0	0	1	0	1	1	0	X	X	X	3

Sheet D	1	2	3	4	5	6	7	8	9	10	11	Final
Belarus (Pavlyuchik)	1	2	0	0	1	0	2	1	0	0	0	7
Croatia (Penava) 🔨	0	0	1	2	0	1	0	0	2	1	1	8

==== Draw 3 ====
Wednesday, October 9, 14:00

Sheet B	1	2	3	4	5	6	7	8	9	10	Final
Slovakia (Kristofcakova)	0	2	0	0	1	0	1	2	0	X	6
Belarus (Pavlyuchik) 🔨	4	0	2	1	0	1	0	0	4	X	12

Sheet C	1	2	3	4	5	6	7	8	9	10	Final
Croatia (Penava)	0	0	3	0	1	1	0	0	X	X	5
Slovenia (Jurinčič) 🔨	4	3	0	3	0	0	1	2	X	X	13

==== Draw 4 ====
Thursday, October 10, 8:00

Sheet B	1	2	3	4	5	6	7	8	9	10	Final
Croatia (Penava)	0	2	0	0	1	0	0	X	X	X	3
Slovakia (Kristofcakova) 🔨	2	0	2	1	0	3	4	X	X	X	12

Sheet D	1	2	3	4	5	6	7	8	9	10	11	Final
Slovenia (Jurinčič)	1	0	0	1	0	3	0	1	0	2	1	9
Belarus (Pavlyuchik) 🔨	0	1	2	0	2	0	2	0	1	0	0	8

==== Draw 5 ====
Thursday, October 10, 16:00

Sheet C	1	2	3	4	5	6	7	8	9	10	11	Final
Belarus (Pavlyuchik) 🔨	1	0	0	1	0	2	0	3	0	0	1	8
Croatia (Penava)	0	1	0	0	2	0	2	0	0	2	0	7

Sheet D	1	2	3	4	5	6	7	8	9	10	11	Final
Slovakia (Kristofcakova)	0	3	0	2	0	1	1	0	0	0	1	8
Slovenia (Jurinčič) 🔨	1	0	1	0	1	0	0	2	1	1	0	7

==== Draw 6 ====
Friday, October 11, 9:00

Sheet B	1	2	3	4	5	6	7	8	9	10	Final
Slovenia (Jurinčič)	0	1	2	0	0	2	1	0	0	1	7
Croatia (Penava) 🔨	1	0	0	1	1	0	0	1	1	0	5

Sheet C	1	2	3	4	5	6	7	8	9	10	Final
Slovakia (Kristofcakova) 🔨	0	0	1	1	0	1	0	1	0	X	4
Belarus (Pavlyuchik)	1	0	0	0	2	0	4	0	1	X	8

=== Tiebreaker ===
Saturday, October 12, 9:00

Sheet D	1	2	3	4	5	6	7	8	9	10	Final
Croatia (Penava) 🔨	3	0	1	0	0	0	0	0	1	1	6
Slovakia (Kristofcakova)	0	2	0	1	1	0	2	2	0	0	8

=== Playoffs ===
Second Place Game			First Place Game
			1	Slovenia	8
1	Slovenia	8	2	Belarus	9
3	Slovakia	6

==== First Place Game ====
Saturday, October 12, 9:00

Sheet D	1	2	3	4	5	6	7	8	9	10	Final
Slovenia (Jurinčič) 🔨	0	1	0	0	2	0	3	0	2	0	8
Belarus (Pavlyuchik)	0	0	0	2	0	4	0	1	0	2	9

==== Second Place Game ====
Saturday, October 12, 14:00

Sheet B	1	2	3	4	5	6	7	8	9	10	Final
Slovenia (Jurinčič) 🔨	0	1	0	0	3	0	0	2	0	2	8
Slovakia (Kristofcakova)	1	0	1	1	0	1	1	0	1	0	6
