= Curling at the 2014 Winter Olympics – Women's tournament =

Women's curling at the XXII Olympic Winter Games
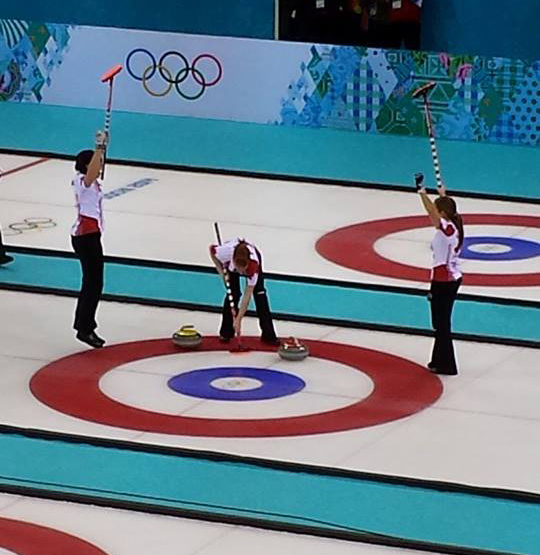
- Canada winning the gold medal
- Venue: Ice Cube Curling Center, Sochi, Russia
- Dates: 10–20 February 2014
- Competitors: 50 from 10 nations

Medalists
1st place, gold medalist(s)		Canada
2nd place, silver medalist(s)		Sweden
3rd place, bronze medalist(s)		Great Britain

The women's curling tournament of the 2014 Winter Olympics was held at the Ice Cube Curling Center in Sochi, Russia on 10–20 February 2014. Ten nations competed in the round robin preliminary round, and the top four nations at the conclusion of the round robin qualified for the medal round. South Korea made their Olympic debut in curling.

A new Olympic record was established when Great Britain scored seven points in one end against the United States. Great Britain also equalled the record for total points scored in one game, scoring twelve points against the United States and against Japan. Canada, skipped by Jennifer Jones, became the first women's rink to go through an Olympic tournament undefeated. Great Britain, by winning the bronze medal became the youngest rink to ever step onto an Olympic curling podium.

== Teams ==
The teams are listed as follows:

Canada	China	Denmark	Great Britain	Japan
St. Vital CC, Winnipeg: Skip: Jennifer Jones; Third: Kaitlyn Lawes; Second: Jill Officer; Lead: Dawn McEwen; Alternate: Kirsten Wall	Harbin CC, Harbin: Skip: Wang Bingyu; Third: Liu Yin; Second: Yue Qingshuang; Lead: Zhou Yan; Alternate: Jiang Yilun	Hvidovre CC, Hvidovre: Skip: Lene Nielsen; Third: Helle Simonsen; Second: Jeanne Ellegaard; Lead: Maria Poulsen; Alternate: Mette de Neergaard	Dunkeld CC, Pitlochry: Skip: Eve Muirhead; Third: Anna Sloan; Second: Vicki Adams; Lead: Claire Hamilton; Alternate: Lauren Gray	Hokkaido Bank Fortius CC, Sapporo: Skip: Ayumi Ogasawara; Third: Yumie Funayama; Second: Kaho Onodera; Lead: Michiko Tomabechi; Alternate: Chinami Yoshida
Russia	South Korea	Sweden	Switzerland	United States
Moskvitch CC, Moscow: Skip: Anna Sidorova; Third: Margarita Fomina; Second: Alexandra Saitova; Lead: Ekaterina Galkina; Alternate: Nkeirouka Ezekh	Gyeonggi-do CC, Gyeonggi: Skip: Kim Ji-sun; Third: Lee Seul-bee; Second: Shin Mi-sung; Lead: Gim Un-chi; Alternate: Um Min-ji	Skellefteå CK, Skellefteå: Fourth: Maria Prytz; Third: Christina Bertrup; Second: Maria Wennerström; Skip: Margaretha Sigfridsson; Alternate: Agnes Knochenhauer	Davos CC, Davos: Skip: Mirjam Ott; Third: Carmen Schäfer; Second: Carmen Küng; Lead: Janine Greiner; Alternate: Alina Pätz	Madison CC, Madison: Skip: Erika Brown; Third: Debbie McCormick; Second: Jessica Schultz; Lead: Ann Swisshelm; Alternate: Allison Pottinger

== Round robin standings ==
Final round robin standings
Team	Skip	Pld	W	L	PF	PA	EW	EL	BE	SE	S%	Qualification
Canada	Jennifer Jones	9	9	0	72	40	43	27	12	14	86%	Playoffs
Sweden	Margaretha Sigfridsson	9	7	2	58	52	37	35	13	7	80%	Playoffs
Switzerland	Mirjam Ott	9	5	4	63	60	37	38	13	7	78%	Playoffs
Great Britain	Eve Muirhead	9	5	4	74	58	39	35	9	11	80%	Playoffs
Japan	Ayumi Ogasawara	9	4	5	59	67	39	41	4	10	76%	
Denmark	Lene Nielsen	9	4	5	57	56	34	40	12	9	78%	
China	Wang Bingyu	9	4	5	58	62	36	38	10	4	81%	
South Korea	Kim Ji-sun	9	3	6	60	65	35	37	10	6	79%	
Russia	Anna Sidorova	9	3	6	48	56	33	35	19	6	82%	
United States	Erika Brown	9	1	8	42	75	33	40	8	5	76%	

== Round robin results ==
All draw times are listed in Moscow Time (UTC+4).

=== Summary ===
Team	CAN	CHN	DEN	GBR	JPN	RUS	KOR	SWE	SUI	USA
Canada	—	9–2	8–5	9–6	8–6	5–3	9–4	9–3	8–5	7–6
China	2–9	—	6–9	7–8	5–8	7–5	11–3	7–6	6–10	7–4
Denmark	5–8	9–6	—	8–7	3–8	4–7	7–4	6–7	6–7	9–2
Great Britain	6–9	8–7	7–8	—	12–3	9–6	10–8	4–6	6–8	12–3
Japan	6–8	8–5	8–3	3–12	—	8–4	7–12	4–8	9–7	6–8
Russia	3–5	5–7	7–4	6–9	4–8	—	4–8	4–5	6–3	9–6
South Korea	4–9	3–11	4–7	8–10	12–7	8–4	—	4–7	6–8	11–2
Sweden	3–9	6–7	7–6	6–4	8–4	5–4	7–4	—	9–8	7–6
Switzerland	5–8	10–6	7–6	8–6	7–9	3–6	8–6	8–9	—	7–4
United States	6–7	4–7	2–9	3–12	8–6	6–9	2–11	6–7	4–7	—

=== Draw 1 ===
Monday, 10 February, 14:00

Sheet A	1	2	3	4	5	6	7	8	9	10	Final
China (Wang)	0	0	0	1	0	1	0	X	X	X	2
Canada (Jones)	0	2	1	0	3	0	3	X	X	X	9

Sheet B	1	2	3	4	5	6	7	8	9	10	Final
Switzerland (Ott)	0	0	0	3	2	0	0	2	0	X	7
United States (Brown)	1	0	1	0	0	1	0	0	1	X	4

Sheet C	1	2	3	4	5	6	7	8	9	10	Final
Sweden (Sigfridsson)	0	1	2	0	0	0	2	0	1	X	6
Great Britain (Muirhead)	0	0	0	1	1	1	0	1	0	X	4

Sheet D	1	2	3	4	5	6	7	8	9	10	Final
Russia (Sidorova)	0	0	1	2	1	0	0	0	2	1	7
Denmark (Nielsen)	0	1	0	0	0	1	1	1	0	0	4

=== Draw 2 ===
Tuesday, 11 February, 09:00

Sheet A	1	2	3	4	5	6	7	8	9	10	Final
Switzerland (Ott)	1	0	2	0	0	2	0	1	0	1	7
Denmark (Nielsen)	0	1	0	2	0	0	1	0	2	0	6

Sheet B	1	2	3	4	5	6	7	8	9	10	Final
Sweden (Sigfridsson)	0	0	1	0	1	0	1	0	X	X	3
Canada (Jones)	0	2	0	2	0	2	0	3	X	X	9

Sheet C	1	2	3	4	5	6	7	8	9	10	Final
Russia (Sidorova)	0	1	0	2	2	0	2	0	2	X	9
United States (Brown)	1	0	3	0	0	1	0	1	0	X	6

Sheet D	1	2	3	4	5	6	7	8	9	10	Final
South Korea (Kim)	0	2	0	2	0	3	0	2	1	2	12
Japan (Ogasawara)	2	0	1	0	2	0	2	0	0	0	7

=== Draw 3 ===
Tuesday, 11 February, 19:00

Sheet A	1	2	3	4	5	6	7	8	9	10	Final
Great Britain (Muirhead)	1	1	0	7	0	3	X	X	X	X	12
United States (Brown)	0	0	1	0	2	0	X	X	X	X	3

Sheet B	1	2	3	4	5	6	7	8	9	10	Final
South Korea (Kim)	0	1	0	1	0	0	2	0	2	0	6
Switzerland (Ott)	0	0	0	0	2	3	0	2	0	1	8

Sheet C	1	2	3	4	5	6	7	8	9	10	Final
Denmark (Nielsen)	0	0	0	0	1	0	2	0	X	X	3
Japan (Ogasawara)	1	1	2	1	0	1	0	2	X	X	8

Sheet D	1	2	3	4	5	6	7	8	9	10	Final
China (Wang)	0	0	1	0	0	2	0	3	0	1	7
Russia (Sidorova)	0	2	0	1	0	0	1	0	1	0	5

=== Draw 4 ===
Wednesday, 12 February, 14:00

Sheet A	1	2	3	4	5	6	7	8	9	10	Final
Japan (Ogasawara)	0	2	0	0	1	1	1	0	1	2	8
Russia (Sidorova)	0	0	1	1	0	0	0	2	0	0	4

Sheet B	1	2	3	4	5	6	7	8	9	10	Final
United States (Brown)	1	0	1	0	0	1	0	0	1	0	4
China (Wang)	0	1	0	0	2	0	0	2	0	2	7

Sheet C	1	2	3	4	5	6	7	8	9	10	Final
South Korea (Kim)	0	1	0	1	0	1	0	0	1	X	4
Sweden (Sigfridsson)	0	0	1	0	3	0	1	2	0	X	7

Sheet D	1	2	3	4	5	6	7	8	9	10	Final
Canada (Jones)	1	0	2	0	3	0	1	0	1	1	9
Great Britain (Muirhead)	0	1	0	2	0	2	0	1	0	0	6

=== Draw 5 ===
Thursday, 13 February, 09:00

Sheet B	1	2	3	4	5	6	7	8	9	10	Final
Canada (Jones)	1	0	2	1	0	0	1	0	3	X	8
Denmark (Nielsen)	0	3	0	0	0	0	0	2	0	X	5

Sheet C	1	2	3	4	5	6	7	8	9	10	Final
China (Wang)	2	0	1	0	1	0	1	0	2	0	7
Great Britain (Muirhead)	0	2	0	2	0	2	0	1	0	1	8

Sheet D	1	2	3	4	5	6	7	8	9	10	Final
Switzerland (Ott)	0	1	0	2	0	0	3	0	2	0	8
Sweden (Sigfridsson)	1	0	3	0	3	0	0	1	0	1	9

=== Draw 6 ===
Thursday, 13 February, 19:00

Sheet A	1	2	3	4	5	6	7	8	9	10	Final
Sweden (Sigfridsson)	0	0	2	0	1	0	2	0	1	1	7
Denmark (Nielsen)	0	2	0	2	0	1	0	1	0	0	6

Sheet B	1	2	3	4	5	6	7	8	9	10	Final
Russia (Sidorova)	1	0	1	0	1	0	0	1	0	X	4
South Korea (Kim)	0	2	0	2	0	0	3	0	1	X	8

Sheet C	1	2	3	4	5	6	7	8	9	10	Final
Switzerland (Ott)	0	0	0	2	0	0	1	2	0	X	5
Canada (Jones)	0	1	1	0	2	1	0	0	3	X	8

Sheet D	1	2	3	4	5	6	7	8	9	10	Final
Japan (Ogasawara)	0	2	0	0	1	0	1	0	2	0	6
United States (Brown)	1	0	1	2	0	1	0	2	0	1	8

=== Draw 7 ===
Friday, 14 February, 14:00

Sheet A	1	2	3	4	5	6	7	8	9	10	Final
South Korea (Kim)	0	0	2	0	0	1	0	0	X	X	3
China (Wang)	0	3	0	0	3	0	3	2	X	X	11

Sheet B	1	2	3	4	5	6	7	8	9	10	Final
Great Britain (Muirhead)	2	0	2	1	0	2	5	X	X	X	12
Japan (Ogasawara)	0	2	0	0	1	0	0	X	X	X	3

Sheet C	1	2	3	4	5	6	7	8	9	10	Final
United States (Brown)	0	0	1	0	1	0	0	0	X	X	2
Denmark (Nielsen)	0	2	0	2	0	2	2	1	X	X	9

Sheet D	1	2	3	4	5	6	7	8	9	10	Final
Russia (Sidorova)	0	2	0	0	0	2	0	0	2	X	6
Switzerland (Ott)	1	0	0	1	0	0	0	1	0	X	3

=== Draw 8 ===
Saturday, 15 February, 09:00

Sheet A	1	2	3	4	5	6	7	8	9	10	Final
Canada (Jones)	2	0	2	0	0	0	2	1	0	1	8
Japan (Ogasawara)	0	2	0	2	1	0	0	0	1	0	6

Sheet B	1	2	3	4	5	6	7	8	9	10	Final
China (Wang)	0	2	1	0	0	2	0	1	0	1	7
Sweden (Sigfridsson)	0	0	0	1	1	0	2	0	2	0	6

Sheet D	1	2	3	4	5	6	7	8	9	10	Final
Great Britain (Muirhead)	0	3	0	1	1	0	2	0	0	3	10
South Korea (Kim)	2	0	0	0	0	2	0	2	2	0	8

=== Draw 9 ===
Saturday, 15 February, 19:00

Sheet A	1	2	3	4	5	6	7	8	9	10	Final
United States (Brown)	1	0	1	0	2	0	0	2	0	0	6
Sweden (Sigfridsson)	0	1	0	2	0	2	0	0	0	2	7

Sheet B	1	2	3	4	5	6	7	8	9	10	Final
Canada (Jones)	0	0	3	0	2	0	0	0	0	X	5
Russia (Sidorova)	0	1	0	1	0	0	0	0	1	X	3

Sheet C	1	2	3	4	5	6	7	8	9	10	Final
Great Britain (Muirhead)	1	0	0	0	1	0	2	0	2	0	6
Switzerland (Ott)	0	2	1	0	0	3	0	1	0	1	8

Sheet D	1	2	3	4	5	6	7	8	9	10	Final
Denmark (Nielsen)	0	2	0	1	2	0	0	0	3	1	9
China (Wang)	2	0	2	0	0	1	0	1	0	0	6

=== Draw 10 ===
Sunday, 16 February, 14:00

Sheet A	1	2	3	4	5	6	7	8	9	10	Final
Denmark (Nielsen)	0	0	0	1	0	2	3	0	1	0	7
South Korea (Kim)	0	1	0	0	1	0	0	1	0	1	4

Sheet B	1	2	3	4	5	6	7	8	9	10	11	Final
Japan (Ogasawara)	0	0	2	1	2	0	2	0	0	0	2	9
Switzerland (Ott)	1	1	0	0	0	3	0	0	1	1	0	7

Sheet C	1	2	3	4	5	6	7	8	9	10	Final
Sweden (Sigfridsson)	0	0	0	2	0	0	0	1	0	2	5
Russia (Sidorova)	0	0	2	0	0	1	0	0	1	0	4

Sheet D	1	2	3	4	5	6	7	8	9	10	11	Final
United States (Brown)	0	0	3	0	1	0	0	1	0	1	0	6
Canada (Jones)	2	1	0	1	0	1	1	0	0	0	1	7

=== Draw 11 ===
Monday, 17 February, 09:00

Sheet A	1	2	3	4	5	6	7	8	9	10	Final
Russia (Sidorova)	0	0	2	0	0	1	0	0	3	0	6
Great Britain (Muirhead)	0	1	0	2	0	0	0	4	0	2	9

Sheet B	1	2	3	4	5	6	7	8	9	10	Final
South Korea (Kim)	4	1	0	2	2	0	2	X	X	X	11
United States (Brown)	0	0	1	0	0	1	0	X	X	X	2

Sheet C	1	2	3	4	5	6	7	8	9	10	Final
Japan (Ogasawara)	2	0	1	0	2	0	1	0	2	X	8
China (Wang)	0	2	0	1	0	1	0	1	0	X	5

=== Draw 12 ===
Monday, 17 February, 19:00

Sheet A	1	2	3	4	5	6	7	8	9	10	Final
China (Wang)	0	0	2	1	0	1	0	0	2	0	6
Switzerland (Ott)	1	3	0	0	2	0	0	3	0	1	10

Sheet B	1	2	3	4	5	6	7	8	9	10	11	Final
Denmark (Nielsen)	2	0	0	0	0	2	0	0	0	3	1	8
Great Britain (Muirhead)	0	0	1	2	0	0	3	1	0	0	0	7

Sheet C	1	2	3	4	5	6	7	8	9	10	Final
Canada (Jones)	0	1	0	2	1	0	1	2	2	X	9
South Korea (Kim)	2	0	2	0	0	0	0	0	0	X	4

Sheet D	1	2	3	4	5	6	7	8	9	10	Final
Sweden (Sigfridsson)	0	2	0	2	1	0	0	2	1	X	8
Japan (Ogasawara)	0	0	2	0	0	1	1	0	0	X	4

== Playoffs ==
Semifinals
1	Canada	6
4	Great Britain	4
2	Sweden	7
3	Switzerland	5

Gold medal game
1	Canada	6
2	Sweden	3
Bronze medal game
4	Great Britain	6
3	Switzerland	5

=== Semifinals ===
Wednesday, 19 February, 14:00

Team	1	2	3	4	5	6	7	8	9	10	Final
Canada (Jones)	2	1	0	1	0	1	0	0	0	1	6
Great Britain (Muirhead)	0	0	2	0	1	0	0	0	1	0	4

Player percentages
Canada		Great Britain	
Dawn McEwen	93%	Claire Hamilton	88%
Jill Officer	80%	Vicki Adams	91%
Kaitlyn Lawes	81%	Anna Sloan	86%
Jennifer Jones	89%	Eve Muirhead	84%
Total	86%	Total	87%

Team	1	2	3	4	5	6	7	8	9	10	Final
Sweden (Sigfridsson)	1	0	2	0	0	0	1	0	2	1	7
Switzerland (Ott)	0	2	0	0	1	0	0	2	0	0	5

Player percentages
Sweden		Switzerland	
Margaretha Sigfridsson	84%	Janine Greiner	90%
Maria Wennerström	81%	Carmen Küng	80%
Christina Bertrup	65%	Carmen Schäfer	76%
Maria Prytz	76%	Mirjam Ott	81%
Total	77%	Total	82%

=== Bronze medal game ===
Thursday, 20 February, 12:30

Team	1	2	3	4	5	6	7	8	9	10	Final
Great Britain (Muirhead)	0	0	1	0	2	0	0	2	0	1	6
Switzerland (Ott)	0	2	0	1	0	1	0	0	1	0	5

Player percentages
Great Britain		Switzerland	
Claire Hamilton	91%	Janine Greiner	78%
Vicki Adams	74%	Carmen Küng	81%
Anna Sloan	74%	Carmen Schäfer	73%
Eve Muirhead	89%	Mirjam Ott	85%
Total	82%	Total	79%

=== Gold medal game ===
Thursday, 20 February, 17:30

Team	1	2	3	4	5	6	7	8	9	10	Final
Canada (Jones)	1	0	0	2	0	0	0	1	2	X	6
Sweden (Sigfridsson)	0	1	0	0	2	0	0	0	0	X	3

Player percentages
Canada		Sweden	
Dawn McEwen	99%	Margaretha Sigfridsson	94%
Jill Officer	76%	Maria Wennerström	88%
Kaitlyn Lawes	68%	Christina Bertrup	79%
Jennifer Jones	88%	Maria Prytz	85%
Total	83%	Total	86%
