= 2013 World Women's Curling Championship =

- Host city: Riga, Latvia
- Arena: Volvo Sports Centre
- Dates: March 16–24
- Winner: Scotland
- Curling club: Dunkeld CC, Pitlochry
- Skip: Eve Muirhead
- Third: Anna Sloan
- Second: Vicki Adams
- Lead: Claire Hamilton
- Alternate: Lauren Gray
- Coach: David Hay
- Finalist: Sweden (Margaretha Sigfridsson)

The 2013 World Women's Curling Championship (branded as the Titlis Glacier Mountain World Women's Curling Championship 2013 for sponsorship reasons) was held at the Volvo Sports Centre in Riga, Latvia from March 16 to 24. It marked the first time that Latvia has hosted the World Women's Championship. This event was also a qualifying event for the 2014 Winter Olympics, awarding points to countries based on performance at the worlds.

Scotland's Eve Muirhead won the event, becoming the youngest skip to ever win the women's curling championship at 22 years of age. She edged Sweden's Margaretha Sigfridsson, the previous year's silver medallist, in the final with a score of 6–5. Canada's Rachel Homan won the bronze medal after defeating Erika Brown of the United States with a score of 8–6.

== Qualification ==
The following nations qualified to participate in the 2013 World Women's Curling Championship:

- Latvia (host country)
- Two teams from the Americas zone
  - Canada
  - United States (given that no challenges in the Americas zone were issued)
- Seven teams from the 2012 European Curling Championships
  - Russia
  - Scotland
  - Sweden
  - Denmark
  - Switzerland
  - Italy
  - Germany
- Two teams from the 2012 Pacific-Asia Curling Championships
  - China
  - Japan

== Teams ==
With Mirjam Ott's Swiss rink losing in the Swiss Championships, there was no defending team at the 2013 Women's Worlds. Representing Switzerland instead was 1999 World Junior champion Silvana Tirinzoni. Returning from the 2012 World championships was the Margaretha Sigfridsson rink, who won silver in 2012 as well as in 2002 and 2009. The team was selected by the Swedish Curling Association, despite losing to Anette Norberg in the Swedish final, feeling that they would be a better representative. Also returning from 2012 was 2009 World Champion Wang Bingyu of China, 2-time European bronze medalist Lene Nielsen of Denmark, 2006 European silver medalist Diana Gaspari of Italy, reigning European champion Anna Sidorova of Russia and four-time World Junior champion Eve Muirhead of Scotland. Also, two-time world champion Andrea Schöpp of Germany, whose team represented Germany in 2012 is also returning, having missed the 2012 tournament due to a leg injury. Making her seventh appearance at the Worlds is U.S. skip, Erika Brown, who is a two-time world silver medalist. The host Latvian team was skipped by Iveta Staša-Šaršūne who finished last in her lone appearance in 2010. Making their World debuts was Canadian skip Rachel Homan, the 2010 World Junior silver medalist and Japanese skip Satsuki Fujisawa who is a two-time Pacific Junior champion.

The teams are listed as follows:

Canada	China	Denmark
Ottawa CC, Ottawa Skip: Rachel Homan; Third: Emma Miskew; Second: Alison Kreviazuk; Lead: Lisa Weagle; Alternate: Stephanie LeDrew	Harbin CC, Harbin Skip: Wang Bingyu; Third: Liu Yin; Second: Yue Qingshuang; Lead: Zhou Yan; Alternate: Liu Jinli	Hvidovre CC, Hvidovre Skip: Lene Nielsen; Third: Helle Simonsen; Second: Jeanne Ellegaard; Lead: Maria Poulsen; Alternate: Mette de Neergaard
Germany	Italy	Japan
SC Riessersee, Garmisch-Partenkirchen Skip: Andrea Schöpp; Third: Imogen Oona Lehmann; Second: Stella Heiß; Lead: Corinna Scholz; Alternate: Nicole Muskatewitz	CC Dolomiti, Cortina d'Ampezzo Skip: Diana Gaspari; Third: Giorgia Apollonio; Second: Chiara Olivieri; Lead: Claudia Alverà; Alternate: Maria Gaspari	Karuizawa CC, Karuizawa Skip: Satsuki Fujisawa; Third: Miyo Ichikawa; Second: Emi Shimizu; Lead: Chiaki Matsumura; Alternate: Miyuki Satoh
Latvia	Russia	Scotland
Jelgavas KK, Jelgava Skip: Iveta Staša-Šaršūne; Third: Ieva Krusta; Second: Zanda Bikše; Lead: Dace Munča; Alternate: Una Ģērmane	Moskvitch CC, Moscow Skip: Anna Sidorova; Third: Liudmila Privivkova; Second: Margarita Fomina; Lead: Ekaterina Galkina; Alternate: Nkeiruka Ezekh	Dunkeld CC, Pitlochry Skip: Eve Muirhead; Third: Anna Sloan; Second: Vicki Adams; Lead: Claire Hamilton; Alternate: Lauren Gray
Sweden	Switzerland	United States
Skellefteå CK, Skellefteå Fourth: Maria Prytz; Third: Christina Bertrup; Second: Maria Wennerström; Skip: Margaretha Sigfridsson; Alternate: Agnes Knochenhauer	CC Aarau, Aarau Skip: Silvana Tirinzoni; Third: Marlene Albrecht; Second: Esther Neuenschwander; Lead: Sandra Gantenbein; Alternate: Manuela Siegrist	Madison CC, Madison Skip: Erika Brown; Third: Debbie McCormick; Second: Jessica Schultz; Lead: Ann Swisshelm; Alternate: Sarah Anderson

== Round robin standings ==
Final Round Robin Standings

Key
Teams to Playoffs
Teams to Tiebreakers

Country	Skip	W	L	PF	PA	Ends Won	Ends Lost	Blank Ends	Stolen Ends	Shot Pct.
Sweden	Margaretha Sigfridsson	10	1	90	45	46	33	16	17	85%
Scotland	Eve Muirhead	10	1	86	50	48	36	8	14	85%
Canada	Rachel Homan	8	3	69	53	45	41	18	12	83%
United States	Erika Brown	6	5	75	62	48	41	14	11	80%
Switzerland	Silvana Tirinzoni	6	5	65	71	44	44	14	12	76%
Russia	Anna Sidorova	6	5	70	67	46	43	11	12	83%
Japan	Satsuki Fujisawa	5	6	62	78	42	47	12	9	77%
Denmark	Lene Nielsen	4	7	65	68	42	47	19	9	79%
China	Wang Bingyu	4	7	63	74	43	46	16	9	80%
Italy	Diana Gaspari	3	8	56	85	34	46	24	4	75%
Germany	Andrea Schöpp	3	8	59	75	41	49	16	6	78%
Latvia	Iveta Staša-Šaršūne	1	10	55	84	41	48	12	8	70%

== Round robin results ==
All draw times are listed in Eastern European Time (UTC+2).

=== Draw 1 ===
Saturday, March 16, 14:00

Sheet A	1	2	3	4	5	6	7	8	9	10	Final
United States (Brown) 🔨	0	0	0	0	4	4	0	0	2	X	10
Italy (Gaspari)	0	0	0	0	0	0	1	2	0	X	3

Sheet B	1	2	3	4	5	6	7	8	9	10	Final
Russia (Sidorova)	0	1	1	0	3	0	1	0	3	0	9
Germany (Schöpp) 🔨	2	0	0	2	0	3	0	1	0	3	11

Sheet C	1	2	3	4	5	6	7	8	9	10	Final
Switzerland (Tirinzoni) 🔨	1	0	2	0	1	0	0	1	0	2	7
Japan (Fujisawa)	0	1	0	2	0	2	0	0	1	0	6

Sheet D	1	2	3	4	5	6	7	8	9	10	Final
Denmark (Nielsen) 🔨	1	0	1	3	5	0	1	0	0	X	11
China (Wang)	0	0	0	0	0	2	0	1	1	X	4

=== Draw 2 ===
Saturday, March 16, 19:00

Sheet A	1	2	3	4	5	6	7	8	9	10	Final
Sweden (Sigfridsson)	0	2	0	0	4	0	0	1	0	X	7
Latvia (Staša-Šaršūne) 🔨	1	0	1	0	0	0	1	0	1	X	4

Sheet B	1	2	3	4	5	6	7	8	9	10	Final
Italy (Gaspari)	3	0	0	0	0	0	0	0	0	X	3
Switzerland (Tirinzoni) 🔨	0	1	0	0	0	1	3	2	2	X	9

Sheet C	1	2	3	4	5	6	7	8	9	10	Final
China (Wang)	0	0	1	0	2	0	0	1	0	X	4
Russia (Sidorova) 🔨	1	1	0	2	0	0	1	0	1	X	6

Sheet D	1	2	3	4	5	6	7	8	9	10	Final
Scotland (Muirhead) 🔨	2	1	0	0	0	1	0	1	1	X	6
Canada (Homan)	0	0	0	0	2	0	2	0	0	X	4

=== Draw 3 ===
Sunday, March 17, 9:00

Sheet B	1	2	3	4	5	6	7	8	9	10	Final
Japan (Fujisawa)	0	0	1	0	0	2	0	0	2	1	6
Denmark (Nielsen) 🔨	0	1	0	0	1	0	1	1	0	0	4

Sheet C	1	2	3	4	5	6	7	8	9	10	Final
United States (Brown)	0	0	1	0	0	0	0	1	3	0	5
Germany (Schöpp) 🔨	0	1	0	0	1	1	2	0	0	1	6

=== Draw 4 ===
Sunday, March 17, 14:00

Sheet A	1	2	3	4	5	6	7	8	9	10	Final
China (Wang) 🔨	1	0	0	0	0	2	0	1	1	0	5
Switzerland (Tirinzoni)	0	2	1	1	0	0	3	0	0	1	8

Sheet B	1	2	3	4	5	6	7	8	9	10	Final
Canada (Homan) 🔨	0	2	0	3	0	2	0	0	0	X	7
Latvia (Staša-Šaršūne)	0	0	1	0	1	0	1	1	1	X	5

Sheet C	1	2	3	4	5	6	7	8	9	10	Final
Sweden (Sigfridsson) 🔨	3	2	0	5	1	0	X	X	X	X	11
Scotland (Muirhead)	0	0	1	0	0	1	X	X	X	X	2

Sheet D	1	2	3	4	5	6	7	8	9	10	Final
Russia (Sidorova) 🔨	0	2	0	1	2	0	2	0	2	X	9
Italy (Gaspari)	0	0	1	0	0	1	0	2	0	X	4

=== Draw 5 ===
Sunday, March 17, 19:00

Sheet A	1	2	3	4	5	6	7	8	9	10	Final
Germany (Schöpp)	1	0	0	1	0	0	0	X	X	X	2
Scotland (Muirhead) 🔨	0	2	2	0	1	1	3	X	X	X	9

Sheet B	1	2	3	4	5	6	7	8	9	10	Final
Sweden (Sigfridsson)	0	3	0	2	0	1	0	3	0	0	9
United States (Brown) 🔨	1	0	1	0	2	0	1	0	2	1	8

Sheet C	1	2	3	4	5	6	7	8	9	10	Final
Canada (Homan) 🔨	0	2	1	1	1	1	2	X	X	X	8
Denmark (Nielsen)	2	0	0	0	0	0	0	X	X	X	2

Sheet D	1	2	3	4	5	6	7	8	9	10	Final
Japan (Fujisawa)	1	3	0	1	1	0	2	0	1	2	11
Latvia (Staša-Šaršūne) 🔨	0	0	2	0	0	4	0	2	0	0	8

=== Draw 6 ===
Monday, March 18, 8:30

Sheet A	1	2	3	4	5	6	7	8	9	10	Final
Russia (Sidorova) 🔨	0	0	1	0	1	0	1	0	1	0	4
Canada (Homan)	0	2	0	0	0	0	0	2	0	1	5

Sheet B	1	2	3	4	5	6	7	8	9	10	Final
Scotland (Muirhead) 🔨	0	0	1	0	1	0	4	0	2	X	8
China (Wang)	1	1	0	1	0	1	0	1	0	X	5

Sheet C	1	2	3	4	5	6	7	8	9	10	Final
Latvia (Staša-Šaršūne)	0	2	0	0	0	0	1	0	2	X	5
Italy (Gaspari) 🔨	3	0	0	3	0	1	0	0	0	X	7

Sheet D	1	2	3	4	5	6	7	8	9	10	Final
Sweden (Sigfridsson) 🔨	2	0	2	1	1	3	X	X	X	X	9
Switzerland (Tirinzoni)	0	0	0	0	0	0	X	X	X	X	0

=== Draw 7 ===
Monday, March 18, 13:30

Sheet A	1	2	3	4	5	6	7	8	9	10	11	Final
Italy (Gaspari)	0	0	0	1	0	1	0	3	0	1	1	7
China (Wang) 🔨	0	0	2	0	2	0	1	0	1	0	0	6

Sheet B	1	2	3	4	5	6	7	8	9	10	11	Final
Germany (Schöpp) 🔨	0	0	0	0	1	2	0	0	0	1	0	4
Japan (Fujisawa)	1	0	1	0	0	0	0	2	0	0	2	6

Sheet C	1	2	3	4	5	6	7	8	9	10	Final
Russia (Sidorova)	0	0	2	0	2	1	0	2	1	X	8
Switzerland (Tirinzoni) 🔨	2	0	0	1	0	0	1	0	0	X	4

Sheet D	1	2	3	4	5	6	7	8	9	10	Final
United States (Brown) 🔨	0	2	1	0	1	0	2	0	0	1	7
Denmark (Nielsen)	0	0	0	1	0	2	0	3	0	0	6

=== Draw 8 ===
Monday, March 18, 18:30

Sheet A	1	2	3	4	5	6	7	8	9	10	Final
Scotland (Muirhead) 🔨	2	0	4	0	1	0	0	1	X	X	8
Japan (Fujisawa)	0	1	0	1	0	1	0	0	X	X	3

Sheet B	1	2	3	4	5	6	7	8	9	10	11	Final
United States (Brown)	0	0	1	1	0	1	0	1	0	0	1	5
Canada (Homan) 🔨	0	1	0	0	1	0	1	0	0	1	0	4

Sheet C	1	2	3	4	5	6	7	8	9	10	11	Final
Denmark (Nielsen) 🔨	0	0	0	1	0	0	0	0	1	2	0	4
Sweden (Sigfridsson)	0	0	0	0	1	0	2	1	0	0	1	5

Sheet D	1	2	3	4	5	6	7	8	9	10	Final
Latvia (Staša-Šaršūne)	0	1	0	0	1	0	0	1	0	X	3
Germany (Schöpp) 🔨	2	0	1	0	0	0	2	0	1	X	6

=== Draw 9 ===
Tuesday, March 19, 8:30

Sheet A	1	2	3	4	5	6	7	8	9	10	Final
Switzerland (Tirinzoni)	0	1	0	2	0	1	0	1	2	0	7
United States (Brown) 🔨	1	0	1	0	1	0	1	0	0	2	6

Sheet B	1	2	3	4	5	6	7	8	9	10	Final
Russia (Sidorova) 🔨	0	0	1	1	0	1	0	1	0	1	5
Denmark (Nielsen)	0	0	0	0	3	0	1	0	0	0	4

Sheet C	1	2	3	4	5	6	7	8	9	10	Final
Germany (Schöpp)	0	0	1	0	1	0	2	0	1	0	5
China (Wang) 🔨	2	0	0	1	0	2	0	1	0	1	7

Sheet D	1	2	3	4	5	6	7	8	9	10	Final
Italy (Gaspari) 🔨	0	1	0	0	1	1	0	1	0	0	4
Japan (Fujisawa)	1	0	0	2	0	0	2	0	0	1	6

=== Draw 10 ===
Tuesday, March 19, 13:30

Sheet A	1	2	3	4	5	6	7	8	9	10	Final
Latvia (Staša-Šaršūne) 🔨	1	0	1	0	1	1	2	1	0	X	7
Russia (Sidorova)	0	3	0	3	0	0	0	0	3	X	9

Sheet B	1	2	3	4	5	6	7	8	9	10	Final
China (Wang)	0	0	2	0	1	0	0	2	0	1	6
Sweden (Sigfridsson) 🔨	0	1	0	2	0	1	0	0	0	0	4

Sheet C	1	2	3	4	5	6	7	8	9	10	Final
Italy (Gaspari) 🔨	2	0	1	0	1	0	0	0	2	0	6
Canada (Homan)	0	2	0	3	0	0	0	1	0	1	7

Sheet D	1	2	3	4	5	6	7	8	9	10	Final
Switzerland (Tirinzoni)	0	0	1	1	0	0	0	2	0	X	4
Scotland (Muirhead) 🔨	2	0	0	0	2	0	2	0	5	X	11

=== Draw 11 ===
Tuesday, March 19, 18:30

Sheet A	1	2	3	4	5	6	7	8	9	10	11	Final
Germany (Schöpp) 🔨	0	2	0	1	0	1	0	0	0	1	0	5
Denmark (Nielsen)	0	0	1	0	1	0	1	1	1	0	1	6

Sheet B	1	2	3	4	5	6	7	8	9	10	Final
Latvia (Staša-Šaršūne) 🔨	0	1	0	1	0	2	0	1	0	X	5
Scotland (Muirhead)	1	0	2	0	2	0	3	0	1	X	9

Sheet C	1	2	3	4	5	6	7	8	9	10	Final
Japan (Fujisawa)	0	1	1	0	0	1	0	0	X	X	3
United States (Brown) 🔨	1	0	0	2	2	0	3	2	X	X	10

Sheet D	1	2	3	4	5	6	7	8	9	10	Final
Canada (Homan) 🔨	0	0	1	0	1	0	0	2	0	0	4
Sweden (Sigfridsson)	1	0	0	1	0	1	1	0	0	4	8

=== Draw 12 ===
Wednesday, March 20, 8:30

Sheet A	1	2	3	4	5	6	7	8	9	10	Final
Japan (Fujisawa) 🔨	1	0	0	2	0	1	0	0	X	X	4
Sweden (Sigfridsson)	0	3	2	0	1	0	2	1	X	X	9

Sheet B	1	2	3	4	5	6	7	8	9	10	Final
Canada (Homan) 🔨	0	2	0	1	0	2	1	1	0	1	8
Germany (Schöpp)	0	0	1	0	3	0	0	0	1	0	5

Sheet C	1	2	3	4	5	6	7	8	9	10	Final
Scotland (Muirhead)	0	0	3	0	1	0	3	0	1	0	8
Denmark (Nielsen) 🔨	0	2	0	1	0	1	0	1	0	1	6

Sheet D	1	2	3	4	5	6	7	8	9	10	Final
Latvia (Staša-Šaršūne)	0	0	0	0	2	0	X	X	X	X	2
United States (Brown) 🔨	2	3	2	0	0	2	X	X	X	X	9

=== Draw 13 ===
Wednesday, March 20, 13:30

Sheet A	1	2	3	4	5	6	7	8	9	10	Final
United States (Brown) 🔨	1	0	0	2	0	1	0	1	0	X	5
China (Wang)	0	1	1	0	0	0	2	0	5	X	9

Sheet B	1	2	3	4	5	6	7	8	9	10	Final
Denmark (Nielsen) 🔨	0	0	2	1	0	0	2	0	2	2	9
Italy (Gaspari)	0	4	0	0	1	0	0	2	0	0	7

Sheet C	1	2	3	4	5	6	7	8	9	10	Final
Switzerland (Tirinzoni)	0	0	0	1	0	2	0	3	1	X	7
Germany (Schöpp) 🔨	0	0	1	0	1	0	1	0	0	X	3

Sheet D	1	2	3	4	5	6	7	8	9	10	Final
Japan (Fujisawa)	0	1	0	1	0	0	1	0	X	X	3
Russia (Sidorova) 🔨	3	0	1	0	3	1	0	2	X	X	10

=== Draw 14 ===
Wednesday, March 20, 18:30

Sheet A	1	2	3	4	5	6	7	8	9	10	Final
Canada (Homan) 🔨	0	1	0	1	0	2	0	3	0	X	7
Switzerland (Tirinzoni)	0	0	1	0	1	0	1	0	1	X	4

Sheet B	1	2	3	4	5	6	7	8	9	10	Final
Sweden (Sigfridsson)	0	1	0	4	1	0	2	2	X	X	10
Russia (Sidorova) 🔨	1	0	0	0	0	2	0	0	X	X	3

Sheet C	1	2	3	4	5	6	7	8	9	10	Final
China (Wang)	0	0	1	1	1	0	2	0	2	X	7
Latvia (Staša-Šaršūne) 🔨	0	0	0	0	0	1	0	2	0	X	3

Sheet D	1	2	3	4	5	6	7	8	9	10	Final
Scotland (Muirhead) 🔨	1	0	2	0	1	2	0	2	0	X	8
Italy (Gaspari)	0	2	0	0	0	0	1	0	1	X	4

=== Draw 15 ===
Thursday, March 21, 8:30

Sheet A	1	2	3	4	5	6	7	8	9	10	Final
Russia (Sidorova) 🔨	0	1	0	1	0	0	0	X	X	X	2
Scotland (Muirhead)	2	0	1	0	2	3	1	X	X	X	9

Sheet B	1	2	3	4	5	6	7	8	9	10	11	Final
Switzerland (Tirinzoni)	1	0	0	1	0	1	2	0	0	2	0	7
Latvia (Staša-Šaršūne) 🔨	0	2	1	0	1	0	0	2	1	0	1	8

Sheet C	1	2	3	4	5	6	7	8	9	10	Final
Sweden (Sigfridsson) 🔨	2	0	0	4	0	0	2	2	X	X	10
Italy (Gaspari)	0	3	0	0	1	0	0	0	X	X	4

Sheet D	1	2	3	4	5	6	7	8	9	10	Final
China (Wang) 🔨	1	0	0	1	0	0	0	0	2	0	4
Canada (Homan)	0	1	1	0	0	0	1	0	0	4	7

=== Draw 16 ===
Thursday, March 21, 13:30

Sheet A	1	2	3	4	5	6	7	8	9	10	Final
Denmark (Nielsen) 🔨	1	0	1	0	2	0	0	2	0	2	8
Latvia (Staša-Šaršūne)	0	1	0	1	0	2	0	0	1	0	5

Sheet B	1	2	3	4	5	6	7	8	9	10	Final
Scotland (Muirhead) 🔨	1	1	0	4	0	1	0	1	0	X	8
United States (Brown)	0	0	1	0	2	0	0	0	1	X	4

Sheet C	1	2	3	4	5	6	7	8	9	10	Final
Canada (Homan)	2	0	2	1	1	0	1	0	1	X	8
Japan (Fujisawa) 🔨	0	1	0	0	0	0	0	3	0	X	4

Sheet D	1	2	3	4	5	6	7	8	9	10	Final
Germany (Schöpp) 🔨	1	0	2	0	0	0	2	1	0	X	6
Sweden (Sigfridsson)	0	3	0	3	1	0	0	0	1	X	8

=== Draw 17 ===
Thursday, March 21, 18:30

Sheet A	1	2	3	4	5	6	7	8	9	10	Final
Italy (Gaspari) 🔨	1	0	0	0	0	2	0	3	0	1	7
Germany (Schöpp)	0	0	0	1	1	0	1	0	3	0	6

Sheet B	1	2	3	4	5	6	7	8	9	10	Final
Japan (Fujisawa) 🔨	1	0	4	0	0	3	0	1	1	X	10
China (Wang)	0	1	0	2	0	0	3	0	0	X	6

Sheet C	1	2	3	4	5	6	7	8	9	10	11	Final
United States (Brown) 🔨	1	0	1	0	2	0	0	0	1	0	1	6
Russia (Privivkova)	0	0	0	1	0	1	1	1	0	1	0	5

Sheet D	1	2	3	4	5	6	7	8	9	10	Final
Denmark (Nielsen)	0	0	0	3	0	1	0	0	1	0	5
Switzerland (Tirinzoni) 🔨	2	0	1	0	1	0	0	1	0	3	8

== Tiebreakers ==
Semifinals			To Playoffs
			1	United States	7
2	Russia	6		Switzerland	4
3	Switzerland	7

Friday, March 22, 9:00

Sheet A	1	2	3	4	5	6	7	8	9	10	11	Final
Russia (Sidorova) 🔨	0	1	0	1	1	0	2	0	0	1	0	6
Switzerland (Tirinzoni)	0	0	1	0	0	3	0	1	1	0	1	7

Player percentages
Russia		Switzerland	
Ekaterina Galkina	91%	Sandra Gantenbein	92%
Margarita Fomina	79%	Esther Neuenschwander	93%
Liudmila Privivkova	85%	Marlene Albrecht	71%
Anna Sidorova	73%	Silvana Tirinzoni	84%
Total	82%	Total	85%

Friday, March 22, 14:00

Sheet C	1	2	3	4	5	6	7	8	9	10	Final
United States (Brown)	1	0	1	0	0	2	1	1	0	1	7
Switzerland (Tirinzoni) 🔨	0	1	0	0	1	0	0	0	2	0	4

Player percentages
United States		Switzerland	
Ann Swisshelm	84%	Sandra Gantenbein	91%
Jessica Schultz	89%	Esther Neuenschwander	86%
Debbie McCormick	84%	Marlene Albrecht	78%
Erika Brown	74%	Silvana Tirinzoni	64%
Total	83%	Total	80%

== Playoffs ==
Page playoff system
1	Sweden	7
2	Scotland	5
3	Canada	7
4	United States	6

Semifinal
2	Scotland	8
3	Canada	7

Gold Medal Game
1	Sweden	5
2	Scotland	6

Bronze Medal Game
3	Canada	8
4	United States	6

=== 1 vs. 2 ===
Friday, March 22, 19:00

Sheet B	1	2	3	4	5	6	7	8	9	10	Final
Sweden (Sigfridsson) 🔨	0	2	0	1	0	1	0	0	0	3	7
Scotland (Muirhead)	0	0	1	0	1	0	1	2	0	0	5

Player percentages
Sweden		Scotland	
Margaretha Sigfridsson	84%	Claire Hamilton	91%
Maria Wennerström	78%	Vicki Adams	80%
Christina Bertrup	69%	Anna Sloan	83%
Maria Prytz	89%	Eve Muirhead	81%
Total	80%	Total	84%

=== 3 vs. 4 ===
Saturday, March 23, 14:00

Sheet B	1	2	3	4	5	6	7	8	9	10	Final
Canada (Homan) 🔨	2	0	2	0	0	2	0	1	0	0	7
United States (Brown)	0	1	0	1	1	0	1	0	1	1	6

Player percentages
Canada		United States	
Lisa Weagle	73%	Ann Swisshelm	86%
Alison Kreviazuk	100%	Jessica Schultz	77%
Emma Miskew	89%	Debbie McCormick	72%
Rachel Homan	87%	Erika Brown	86%
Total	87%	Total	80%

=== Semifinal ===
Saturday, March 23, 19:00

Sheet B	1	2	3	4	5	6	7	8	9	10	Final
Scotland (Muirhead) 🔨	2	0	2	0	1	0	1	0	1	1	8
Canada (Homan)	0	2	0	2	0	1	0	2	0	0	7

Player percentages
Scotland		Canada	
Claire Hamilton	94%	Lisa Weagle	77%
Vicki Adams	71%	Alison Kreviazuk	85%
Anna Sloan	87%	Emma Miskew	89%
Eve Muirhead	88%	Rachel Homan	86%
Total	85%	Total	84%

=== Bronze medal game ===
Sunday, March 24, 9:00

Sheet B	1	2	3	4	5	6	7	8	9	10	Final
Canada (Homan) 🔨	1	0	3	0	1	0	2	0	1	0	8
United States (Brown)	0	2	0	1	0	1	0	1	0	1	6

Player percentages
Canada		United States	
Lisa Weagle	82%	Ann Swisshelm	87%
Alison Kreviazuk	91%	Jessica Schultz	89%
Emma Miskew	83%	Debbie McCormick	89%
Rachel Homan	94%	Erika Brown	87%
Total	88%	Total	88%

=== Gold medal game ===
Sunday, March 24, 14:00

Sheet B	1	2	3	4	5	6	7	8	9	10	Final
Sweden (Sigfridsson) 🔨	0	2	0	0	1	0	1	0	1	0	5
Scotland (Muirhead)	0	0	1	2	0	1	0	1	0	1	6

Player percentages
Sweden		Scotland	
Margaretha Sigfridsson	82%	Claire Hamilton	83%
Maria Wennerström	66%	Vicki Adams	74%
Christina Bertrup	80%	Anna Sloan	86%
Maria Prytz	82%	Eve Muirhead	85%
Total	78%	Total	82%

2013 Titlis Glacier Mountain
World Women's Curling Championship winner
(Scotland)
Scotland
2nd title

== Statistics ==
=== Top 5 player percentages ===
Round robin only

Leads	%
(Denmark) Maria Poulsen	86
(Russia) Ekaterina Galkina	86
(China) Zhou Yan	86
(Germany) Corinna Scholz	83
(Scotland) Claire Hamilton	83

Seconds	%
(Canada) Alison Kreviazuk	87
(Sweden) Maria Wennerström	86
(Scotland) Vicki Adams	86
(Russia) Margarita Fomina	85
(United States) Jessica Schultz	81

Thirds	%
(Sweden) Christina Bertrup	86
(Scotland) Anna Sloan	84
(Canada) Emma Miskew	82
(Russia) Liudmila Privivkova	82
(United States) Debbie McCormick	80

Skips	%
(Scotland) Eve Muirhead	87
(Sweden) Maria Prytz (Fourth)	86
(Canada) Rachel Homan	82
(United States) Erika Brown	80
(Russia) Anna Sidorova	80
