= Carmen Schäfer =

Carmen Schäfer may refer to:

- Carmen Schäfer (curler) (born 1981), Swiss curler
- Carmen Schäfer (footballer) (born 1971), German footballer
