= Anneline Skårsmoen =

Norwegian curler

- Curler
- Born: 23 June 1989 (age 37)

Curling career
- Member Association: Norway
- World Championship: 1 (2015)
- European Championship: 4 (2013, 2014, 2015, 2016)

Anneline Skårsmoen (born 23 June 1989) is a Norwegian curler. She competed at the 2015 World Women's Curling Championship in Sapporo, Japan. She also took part in the 2013 and 2014 European Curling Championships.
