= 2008 Continental Cup of Curling =

Coordinates: 53°01′05″N 112°49′38″W

- Host city: Camrose, Alberta
- Arena: EnCana Arena
- Dates: December 18–21
- Winner: Team World
Score Breakdown
| Discipline | NA | World |
| Women's Team Round 1 | 3 | 15 |
| Mixed Doubles Round 1 | 3 | 15 |
| Men's Team Round 1 | 12 | 6 |
| Women's Team Round 2 | 0 | 18 |
| Mixed Doubles Round 2 | 6 | 12 |
| Men's Team Round 2 | 12 | 6 |
| Singles | 10 | 22 |
| Women's Skins | 43 | 62 |
| Men's Skins | 78 | 27 |
| Mixed Skins | 29 | 21 |
| Total | 192 | 208 |

The 2008 Continental Cup of Curling was the 6th edition of this event and was held from December 18–21, 2008 at the EnCana Arena in Camrose, Alberta. It was the first edition of the Continental Cup in which teams outside of North America and Europe competed, due to the outstanding performance of the Chinese teams in the previous year's men's and women's world championships. To reflect the expanded participation, the team opposing North America was renamed from "Team Europe" to "Team World". The World Curling Federation named the six rinks representing Team World. The Canada Cup of Curling, Tournament of Hearts and Brier winners automatically qualify as the Canadian rinks in Team North America, while the American contingent in Team North America are represented by their men's and women's champions. The event was won by Team World by a score of 208-192, with the winning points scored in the fourth end in the men's featured skins game.

The prize purse was $88,400 (CAD); each member of the winning team received $2000, while each member of the losing team received $1400.

The Continental Divide, the entertainment centre, was located at the adjacent Border Paving Arena.

The ice technician is Tim Yeo.

== Scoring ==
Each match is worth a different number of points, with a total of 400 available in the event.

== Broadcast ==
TSN televised every draw of the Continental Cup, with the men's team games and the women's feature skins games on tape-delay (while broadcast live on TSN2) and the remainder of the draws live.

== Teams ==
Team North America was coached by (Canada) Jim Waite and captained by (Canada) Russ Howard. Team World was coached by (Sweden) Peja Lindholm and captained by (Norway) Pål Trulsen.

| Team | Country | Home | Skip | Third | Second | Lead |
|---|---|---|---|---|---|---|
| North America | United States | Madison, Wisconsin | Craig Brown | Rich Ruohonen | John Dunlop | Peter Annis |
| North America | Canada | Winnipeg, Manitoba | Jennifer Jones | Cathy Overton-Clapham | Jill Officer | Dawn Askin |
| North America | Canada | Edmonton, Alberta | Kevin Koe* | Blake MacDonald | Carter Rycroft | Nolan Thiessen |
| North America | Canada | Saskatoon, Saskatchewan | Stefanie Lawton | Marliese Kasner | Teejay Surik | Lana Vey |
| North America | Canada | Edmonton, Alberta | Kevin Martin | John Morris | Marc Kennedy | Ben Hebert |
| North America | United States | Madison, Wisconsin | Debbie McCormick | Allison Pottinger | Nicole Joraanstad | Tracy Sachtjen |
| World | Scotland/Sweden | Lockerbie | David Murdoch | Ewan MacDonald | Niklas Edin | Euan Byers |
| World | Sweden | Härnösand | Anette Norberg | Kajsa Bergström | Cathrine Lindahl | Anna Svärd |
| World | Switzerland | Davos | Mirjam Ott | Carmen Schäfer | Valeria Spälty | Janine Greiner |
| World | China | Harbin | Wang Bingyu | Liu Yin | Yue Qingshuang | Zhou Yan |
| World | China | Harbin | Wang Fengchun | Liu Rui | Xu Xiaoming | Zang Jialiang |
| World | Norway | Oslo | Thomas Ulsrud | Torger Nergård | Christoffer Svae | Håvard Vad Petersson |

* Throws third rocks

== Results ==
=== Women's team ===
==== Draw 1 (December 18) ====
| Sheet A | 1 | 2 | 3 | 4 | 5 | 6 | 7 | 8 | Final | Points |
| World (Wang) | 0 | 1 | 0 | 1 | 0 | 3 | 1 | 2 | 8 | 6 |
| North America (Lawton) | 0 | 0 | 2 | 0 | 1 | 0 | 0 | 0 | 3 | 0 |

| Sheet B | 1 | 2 | 3 | 4 | 5 | 6 | 7 | 8 | Final | Points |
| World (Norberg) | 2 | 1 | 0 | 0 | 0 | 1 | 0 | 0 | 4 | 3 |
| North America (Jones) | 0 | 0 | 1 | 1 | 0 | 0 | 0 | 2 | 4 | 3 |

| Sheet C | 1 | 2 | 3 | 4 | 5 | 6 | 7 | 8 | Final | Points |
| World (Ott) | 3 | 2 | 0 | 4 | 0 | 1 | 0 | X | 10 | 6 |
| North America (McCormick) | 0 | 0 | 1 | 0 | 1 | 0 | 1 | X | 3 | 0 |

==== Draw 4 (December 19) ====
| Sheet A | 1 | 2 | 3 | 4 | 5 | 6 | 7 | 8 | Final | Points |
| World (Wang) | 0 | 1 | 1 | 0 | 0 | 1 | 1 | 1 | 5 | 6 |
| North America (Jones) | 1 | 0 | 0 | 1 | 2 | 0 | 0 | 0 | 4 | 0 |

| Sheet B | 1 | 2 | 3 | 4 | 5 | 6 | 7 | 8 | Final | Points |
| World (Norberg) | 0 | 2 | 0 | 1 | 2 | 0 | 0 | 0 | 5 | 6 |
| North America (McCormick) | 0 | 0 | 0 | 0 | 0 | 1 | 1 | 1 | 3 | 0 |

| Sheet C | 1 | 2 | 3 | 4 | 5 | 6 | 7 | 8 | Final | Points |
| World (Ott) | 0 | 2 | 0 | 2 | 0 | 3 | 1 | 0 | 8 | 6 |
| North America (Lawton) | 1 | 0 | 1 | 0 | 2 | 0 | 0 | 1 | 5 | 0 |

=== Men's team ===
==== Draw 3 (December 18) ====
| Sheet A | 1 | 2 | 3 | 4 | 5 | 6 | 7 | 8 | Final | Points |
| World (Ulsrud) | 2 | 0 | 1 | 1 | 0 | 0 | 2 | 0 | 6 | 6 |
| North America (Koe) | 0 | 1 | 0 | 0 | 0 | 2 | 0 | 1 | 4 | 0 |

| Sheet B | 1 | 2 | 3 | 4 | 5 | 6 | 7 | 8 | Final | Points |
| World (Wang) | 0 | 0 | 1 | 0 | 0 | 0 | 0 | X | 1 | 0 |
| North America (Martin) | 2 | 2 | 0 | 3 | 1 | 1 | 1 | X | 10 | 6 |

| Sheet C | 1 | 2 | 3 | 4 | 5 | 6 | 7 | 8 | Final | Points |
| World (Murdoch) | 1 | 0 | 0 | 0 | 1 | 0 | 1 | 1 | 4 | 0 |
| North America (Brown) | 0 | 0 | 2 | 1 | 0 | 3 | 0 | 0 | 6 | 6 |

==== Draw 6 (December 19) ====
| Sheet A | 1 | 2 | 3 | 4 | 5 | 6 | 7 | 8 | Final | Points |
| World (Murdoch) | 4 | 0 | 5 | 0 | 0 | X | X | X | 9 | 6 |
| North America (Koe) | 0 | 2 | 0 | 0 | 2 | X | X | X | 4 | 0 |

| Sheet B | 1 | 2 | 3 | 4 | 5 | 6 | 7 | 8 | Final | Points |
| World (Ulsrud) | 1 | 0 | 0 | 0 | 1 | 0 | 1 | 0 | 3 | 0 |
| North America (Martin) | 0 | 2 | 1 | 1 | 0 | 2 | 0 | 1 | 7 | 6 |

| Sheet X | 1 | 2 | 3 | 4 | 5 | 6 | 7 | 8 | Final | Points |
| World (Wang) | 0 | 0 | 1 | 0 | 0 | 2 | 0 | 0 | 3 | 0 |
| North America (Brown) | 0 | 1 | 0 | 2 | 0 | 0 | 2 | 1 | 6 | 6 |

=== Mixed doubles ===
==== Draw 2 (December 18) ====
| Sheet A | 1 | 2 | 3 | 4 | 5 | 6 | 7 | 8 | Final | Points |
| World (Nergård/Norberg) | 2 | 1 | 0 | 1 | 0 | 1 | 1 | 1 | 7 | 6 |
| North America (Brown/Pottinger) | 0 | 0 | 3 | 0 | 2 | 0 | 0 | 0 | 5 | 0 |

| Sheet B | 1 | 2 | 3 | 4 | 5 | 6 | 7 | 8 | Final | Points |
| World (Lindahl/Ulsrud) | 0 | 1 | 0 | 3 | 0 | 1 | 1 | 1 | 7 | 3 |
| North America (Jones/Kennedy) | 5 | 0 | 1 | 0 | 1 | 0 | 0 | 0 | 7 | 3 |

| Sheet C | 1 | 2 | 3 | 4 | 5 | 6 | 7 | 8 | Final | Points |
| World (MacDonald/Ott) | 1 | 0 | 5 | 0 | 3 | 2 | 0 | 1 | 12 | 6 |
| North America (Koe/Overton-Clapham) | 0 | 2 | 0 | 1 | 0 | 0 | 3 | 0 | 6 | 0 |

==== Draw 5 (December 19) ====
| Sheet A | 1 | 2 | 3 | 4 | 5 | 6 | 7 | 8 | Final | Points |
| World (Murdoch/Schafer) | 3 | 0 | 3 | 0 | 3 | 2 | 2 | X | 13 | 6 |
| North America (McCormick/Ruohonen) | 0 | 1 | 0 | 1 | 0 | 0 | 0 | X | 2 | 0 |

| Sheet B | 1 | 2 | 3 | 4 | 5 | 6 | 7 | 8 | Final | Points |
| World (Wang F./Liu Y.) | 2 | 0 | 2 | 0 | 2 | 0 | 2 | 0 | 8 | 6 |
| North America (Lawton/Rycroft) | 0 | 2 | 0 | 3 | 0 | 1 | 0 | 1 | 7 | 0 |

| Sheet C | 1 | 2 | 3 | 4 | 5 | 6 | 7 | 8 | Final | Points |
| World (Wang B./Liu R.) | 0 | 2 | 0 | 1 | 0 | 2 | 0 | 0 | 5 | 0 |
| North America (Kasner/Morris) | 2 | 0 | 4 | 0 | 1 | 0 | 2 | 3 | 12 | 6 |

=== Singles ===
Team World wins the eight points for the greater aggregate score for singles play, 96-93.

==== Draw 8 - December 20 ====
| Sheet A | Runthrough | Button | Port | Raise | Hit-and-Roll | Double | Total | Points |
| World (Wang) | 0 | 4 | 5 | 3 | 5 | 3 | 20 | 4 |
| North America (Koe) | 0 | 5 | 5 | 4 | 1 | 0 | 15 | 0 |

| Sheet B | Runthrough | Button | Port | Raise | Hit-and-Roll | Double | Total | Points |
| World (Murdoch) | 0 | 5 | 3 | 2 | 1 | 5 | 16 | 0 |
| North America (Martin) | 0 | 5 | 5 | 3 | 1 | 5 | 19 | 4 |

| Sheet C | Runthrough | Button | Port | Raise | Hit-and-Roll | Double | Total | Points |
| World (Ulsrud) | 0 | 4 | 5 | 5 | 4 | 0 | 18 | 4 |
| North America (Brown) | 0 | 5 | 4 | 5 | 3 | 0 | 17 | 0 |

| Sheet A | Runthrough | Button | Port | Raise | Hit-and-Roll | Double | Total | Points |
| World (Ott) | 1 | 3 | 2 | 4 | 1 | 0 | 11 | 2 |
| North America (McCormick) | 0 | 5 | 2 | 2 | 2 | 2 | 11 | 2 |

| Sheet B | Runthrough | Button | Port | Raise | Hit-and-Roll | Double | Total | Points |
| World (Wang) | 5 | 3 | 5 | 2 | 3 | 0 | 18 | 4 |
| North America (Jones) | 0 | 5 | 4 | 5 | 1 | 1 | 16 | 0 |

| Sheet C | Runthrough | Button | Port | Raise | Hit-and-Roll | Double | Total | Points |
| World (Norberg) | 0 | 5 | 4 | 1 | 1 | 1 | 12 | 0 |
| North America (Lawton) | 0 | 5 | 5 | 1 | 4 | 0 | 15 | 4 |

=== Women's Skins ===
Draw 7 contains the 20-point game, Draw 9 is the 30-point game, and Draw 10 is the feature game.

==== Draw 7 - December 20 ====
| Sheet C | 1 | 2 | 3 | 4 | 5 | 6 | 7 | 8 | Points |
| World (Wang) | | | | | 0 | | 0 | X | 10 |
| North America (McCormick) | 0 | X | X | X | | X | | | 10 |

==== Draw 9 - December 20 ====
| Sheet C | 1 | 2 | 3 | 4 | 5 | 6 | 7 | 8 | Points |
| World (Ott) | 0 | X | | 0 | | 0 | | X | 11 |
| North America (Lawton) | | | 0 | | 0 | | X | | 19 |

==== Draw 10 - December 21 ====
| Sheet A | 1 | 2 | 3 | 4 | 5 | 6 | 7 | 8 | Points |
| World (Norberg) | | | 0 | X | | 0 | X | X | 41 |
| North America (Jones) | X | X | | | X | | | | 14 |

=== Men's Skins ===
Draw 7 is the 20-point game, Draw 9 is the 30-point game, and Draw 10 is the feature game.

==== Draw 7 - December 20 ====
| Sheet A | 1 | 2 | 3 | 4 | 5 | 6 | 7 | 8 | Points |
| World (Wang) | X | X | | X | | X | | | 10 |
| North America (Brown) | | | 0 | | 0 | | 0 | X | 10 |

==== Draw 9 - December 20 ====
| Sheet A | 1 | 2 | 3 | 4 | 5 | 6 | 7 | 8 | Points |
| World (Murdoch) | X | X | | 0 | | 0 | | | 2 |
| North America (Koe) | | | 0 | | X | | X | X | 28 |

==== Draw 10 - December 21 ====
| Sheet B | 1 | 2 | 3 | 4 | 5 | 6 | 7 | 8 | Points |
| World (Ulsrud) | | X | | X | | | 0 | | 15 |
| North America (Martin) | X | | 0 | | X | X | | X | 40 |

=== Mixed Skins ===
Draw 7 is the 20-point game, while Draw 9 is the 30-point game.

==== Draw 7 - December 20 ====
| Sheet B | 1 | 2 | 3 | 4 | 5 | 6 | 7 | 8 | Points |
| World (Murdoch/Schafer/Svae/Svard) | X | | 0 | X | | 0 | | | 5 |
| North America (Morris/Kasner/MacDonald/Vey) | | X | | | 0 | | X | X | 15 |

==== Draw 9 - December 20 ====
| Sheet B | 1 | 2 | 3 | 4 | 5 | 6 | 7 | 8 | Points |
| World (Ulsrud/Norberg/Wang B./Wang F.) | | | X | X | | | | X | 16 |
| North America (Martin/Jones/Kennedy/Askin) | X | 0 | | | 0 | X | X | | 14 |

== Sources ==
- Official Site
