= Dace Munča =

Latvian curler

- Curler

Team
- Curling club: Jelgavas KK, Jelgava
- Skip: Iveta Staša-Šaršūne
- Third: Ieva Krusta
- Second: Zanda Bikše
- Lead: Una Ģērmane
- Alternate: Dace Munča

Curling career
- World Championship: 2 (2010, 2013)
- European Championship: 3 (2008, 2009, 2012)

Dace Munča is a Latvian curler.

She was alternate for the Latvian team at the 2010 Ford World Women's Curling Championship in Swift Current, Canada. She also represented Latvia at the 2013 World Women's Curling Championship at home in Riga, Latvia, finishing in last place with a 1–10 record.
