= Lene Nielsen =

Danish curler (born 1986)

- Curler
- Born: 31 August 1986 (age 40); Hvidovre, Denmark

Curling career
- Member Association: Denmark
- World Championship: 8 (2004, 2005, 2011, 2012, 2013, 2015, 2016, 2017)
- European Championship: 10 (2004, 2005, 2007, 2010, 2011, 2012, 2013, 2014, 2015, 2016)
- Olympic: 2 (2006, 2014)
Medal record
Women's curling
Representing Denmark
European Curling Championships
Bronze medal – third place	2005 Garmish-Partenkirchen
Bronze medal – third place	2007 Füssen
World Junior Curling Championships
Bronze medal – third place	2006 Jeonju

Lene Nielsen (born 31 August 1986 in Hvidovre) is a Danish curler. She was the skip of the 2014 Danish Olympic Curling Team.

== Career ==
Nielsen played in her first international events in 2004, as an alternate for the Madeleine Dupont rink. Even though she was an alternate, she played many games. At the 2004 World Junior Curling Championships, the team finished 6th and at the 2004 Ford World Women's Curling Championship they finished in 8th. They finished in 8th place at the 2004 European Curling Championships.

Later that season, Nielsen was promoted to third on the team and they won a silver medal at the 2005 European Youth Olympic Winter Festival. She then played second on the team at the 2005 World Junior Curling Championships, where the rink finished 4th. At the 2005 World Women's Curling Championship, the rink finished in 10th.

The following season, Nielsen moved to play second for Dorthe Holm's rink. They won a bronze medal at the 2005 European Curling Championships and finished in 8th place at the 2006 Winter Olympics. Also that season, Nielsen skipped the Danish team to a bronze medal finish at the 2006 World Junior Curling Championships.

At this point, Nielsen left the main Danish team to form her own rink. At the 2007 European Curling Championships, she skipped Denmark to a bronze medal. At the 2010 European Curling Championships, she skipped Denmark to a 5th-place finish.

In 2011, Nielsen won her first World Curling Tour event at the International Bernese Ladies Cup. She also won the Danish national championships for the first time as a skip, which gave her the right to represent Denmark at the 2011 Capital One World Women's Curling Championship in Esbjerg. She and her team finished in fourth place after a close loss in the bronze medal game to Wang Bingyu.

She had another successful Euros when her Danish team finished 4th at the 2011 European Curling Championships. She returned to the world championships in 2012 in Lethbridge, Alberta, but failed to reach the playoffs, finishing with a 5–6 record.

The following season, Nielsen's Danish rink once again finished 4th at the 2012 European Curling Championships. Her team made the World Championships again, but finished with a worse result, a 4–7 record.

Nielsen's rink played in their first Grand Slam event at the 2013 Curlers Corner Autumn Gold Curling Classic, where they won two games, but were eliminated before the playoffs. She skipped Denmark at the 2013 European Curling Championships, where they finished in 4th place for the third time in her career.

Nielsen skipped the Danish women's team at the 2014 Winter Olympics, where she was also the flag bearer for Denmark in the opening ceremonies. At the games, she led the team to a 6th-place finish with a 4–5 record.

== Grand Slam record ==
Key
C	Champion
F	Lost in Final
SF	Lost in Semifinal
QF	Lost in Quarterfinals
R16	Lost in the round of 16
Q	Did not advance to playoffs
T2	Played in Tier 2 event
DNP	Did not participate in event
N/A	Not a Grand Slam event that season

Event	2013–14
Autumn Gold	Q

== Personal life ==
Nielsen is employed as an insurance underwriter.

Olympic Games
Preceded by Sophie Fjellvang-Sølling	Flagbearer for Denmark; Sochi 2014	Succeeded by Elena Møller Rigas
