= Una Ģērmane =

Latvian curler

- Curler
- Other names: Una Grava-Ģērmane

Team
- Curling club: Jelgavas KK, Jelgava
- Skip: Iveta Staša-Šaršūne
- Third: Ieva Krusta
- Second: Zanda Bikše
- Lead: Una Ģērmane
- Alternate: Dace Munča

Curling career
- World Championship: 2 (2010, 2013)
- European Championship: 6 (2002, 2003, 2005, 2008, 2009, 2012)

Una Ģērmane (born 2 September 1971) is a Latvian curler.

She was third for the Latvian team at the 2010 Ford World Women's Curling Championship in Swift Current, Canada. She also represented Latvia at the 2013 World Women's Curling Championship at home in Riga, Latvia, finishing in last place with a 1-10 record.
