= Carmen Küng =

Swiss curler

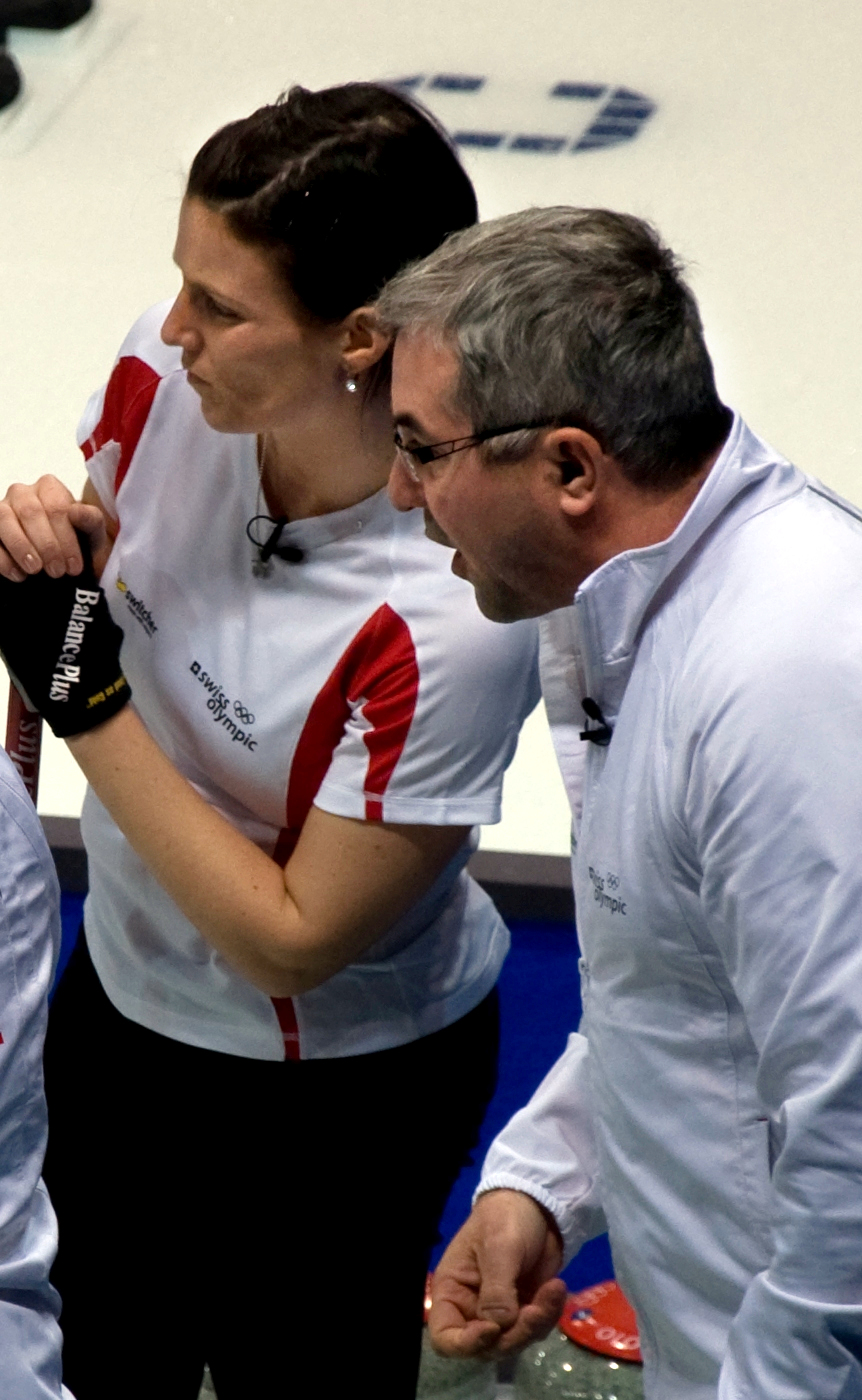
- Carmen Küng and the trainer of Swiss Women's Olympic team

Medal record

World Championships
Gold medal – first place	2012 Lethbridge	
Bronze medal – third place	2004 Gävle	
Bronze medal – third place	2008 Vernon	

European Championships
Gold medal – first place	2008 Örnsköldsvik	
Silver medal – second place	2009 Aberdeen	
Bronze medal – third place	2010 Campéry	
Bronze medal – third place	2013 Stavanger	

Carmen Küng (born 30 January 1978) is a curler from Solothurn, Switzerland.

Carmen Küng began her senior elite career as the Third for 2002 Olympic Silver medalist Luzia Ebnöther during the 2006–2007 season. (During this season, future Olympic teammate Carmen Schäfer threw second stones.) She would later move to the team of Silvana Tirinzoni for the 2008–2009 season.

In the following season she joined her current team. Initially, she joined Mirjam Ott's team as the alternate and served in that capacity at both the 2008 and 2009 World Championships.

Starting with the 2009–2010 competitive season, Carmen Küng has played as the Second for Team Ott. The highlights for the team include winning the Silver medal at the 2009 European Curling Championships and an appearance at the 2010 Vancouver Olympic Games.

== Teammates ==
2010 Vancouver Olympic Games

Mirjam Ott, Skip

Carmen Schäfer, Third

Janine Greiner, Lead

Irene Schori, Alternate

2008 Vernon World Championships

2008 Örnsköldsvik European Championships

2009 Gangneung World Championships

2009 Aberdeen European Championships

Mirjam Ott, Skip

Carmen Schäfer, Third

Valeria Spälty, Second

Janine Greiner, Lead

Note: for the 2009 European Championships Valeria Spälty was not on the team. Carmen Küng threw second stones and Binia Feltscher-Beeli served as the Alternate.
