= 2013 European Curling Championships =

- Host city: Stavanger, Norway
- Arena: Sørmarka Arena
- Dates: November 22–30
- Men's winner: Switzerland
- Curling club: CC Adelboden, Adelboden
- Skip: Sven Michel
- Third: Claudio Pätz
- Second: Sandro Trolliet
- Lead: Simon Gempeler
- Alternate: Benoît Schwarz
- Finalist: Norway (Thomas Ulsrud)
- Women's winner: Sweden
- Curling club: Skellefteå CK, Skellefteå
- Skip: Margaretha Sigfridsson
- Fourth: Maria Prytz
- Third: Christina Bertrup
- Second: Maria Wennerström
- Alternate: Agnes Knochenhauer
- Finalist: Scotland (Eve Muirhead)

The 2013 European Curling Championships were held from November 22 to 30 at the Sørmarka Arena in Stavanger, Norway. Norway last hosted the European Curling Championships in 1990. The Group C competitions were held in October at the Tårnby Curling Club in Tårnby, Denmark.

At the conclusion of the championships, the top eight women's teams advanced to the 2014 Ford World Women's Curling Championship, and the top eight men's teams advanced to the 2014 World Men's Curling Championship.

== Men ==
=== Group A ===
The Group A competitions were contested in Stavanger.

==== Round-robin standings ====
Final round-robin standings

Key
Teams to Playoffs
Countries relegated to 2014 Group B

Country	Skip	W	L
Norway	Thomas Ulsrud	8	1
Switzerland	Sven Michel	7	2
Denmark	Rasmus Stjerne	7	2
Scotland	David Murdoch	7	2
Sweden	Niklas Edin	5	4
Russia	Andrey Drozdov	4	5
Czech Republic	Jiří Snítil	3	6
Latvia	Ritvars Gulbis	2	7
France	Joffrey Vincent	1	8
Finland	Tomi Rantamäki	1	8

==== Playoffs ====
Page playoff system
1	Norway	7
2	Switzerland	4
3	Denmark	6
4	Scotland	5

Semifinal
2	Switzerland	8
3	Denmark	7

Final
1	Norway	6
2	Switzerland	8

Bronze-medal game
3	Denmark	6
4	Scotland	7

==== Bronze-medal game ====
Saturday, November 30, 10:00

Sheet B	1	2	3	4	5	6	7	8	9	10	Final
Denmark (Stjerne) 🔨	2	0	1	0	0	2	0	0	1	0	6
Scotland (Murdoch)	0	1	0	0	3	0	0	1	0	2	7

Player percentages
Denmark		Scotland	
Troels Harry	90%	Michael Goodfellow	90%
Mikkel Poulsen	78%	Scott Andrews	83%
Johnny Frederiksen	79%	Greg Drummond	89%
Rasmus Stjerne	80%	David Murdoch	88%
Total	82%	Total	87%

==== Final ====
Saturday, November 30, 15:00

Sheet D	1	2	3	4	5	6	7	8	9	10	Final
Norway (Ulsrud) 🔨	0	2	0	2	0	0	0	0	2	0	6
Switzerland (Michel)	0	0	3	0	1	0	0	3	0	1	8

Player percentages
Norway		Switzerland	
Håvard Vad Petersson	86%	Simon Gempeler	92%
Christoffer Svae	75%	Benoît Schwarz	83%
Torger Nergård	90%	Claudio Pätz	81%
Thomas Ulsrud	73%	Sven Michel	90%
Total	81%	Total	86%

=== Group B ===
The Group B competitions were contested in Stavanger.

==== Round-robin standings ====
Final round-robin standings

Key
Countries to Playoffs
Countries to Tiebreakers
Countries relegated to 2014 Group C

Yellow Group	Skip	W	L
Germany	John Jahr	7	0
Italy	Amos Mosaner	5	2
Estonia	Martin Lill	5	2
England	Alan MacDougall	5	2
Turkey	Alican Karataş	3	4
Spain	Mikel Unanue	2	5
Romania	Allen Coliban	1	6
Slovakia	Pavel Kocian	0	7

Blue Group	Skip	W	L
Hungary	Gábor Ézsöl	7	0
Poland	Tomasz Zioło	5	2
Netherlands	Jaap van Dorp	5	2
Wales	Adrian Meikle	4	3
Austria	Markus Forejtek	3	4
Croatia	Alen Čadež	2	5
Lithuania	Tadas Vyskupaitis	1	6
Belgium	Timothy Verreycken	1	6

Belgium relegated to Group C after losing tiebreaker to Lithuania.

==== Playoffs ====
Page playoff system
Y1	Germany	7
B1	Hungary	1
Y2	Italy	6
B2	Netherlands	4

Semifinal
B1	Hungary	6
Y2	Italy	7

Final
Y1	Germany	9
Y2	Italy	3

Bronze-medal game
B1	Hungary	7
B2	Netherlands	5

===== Bronze-medal game =====
Friday, November 29, 12:00

Sheet H	1	2	3	4	5	6	7	8	9	10	Final
Hungary (Ézsöl)	0	3	0	0	1	1	0	1	0	1	7
Netherlands (van Dorp) 🔨	1	0	1	1	0	0	1	0	1	0	5

===== Final =====
Friday, November 29, 12:00

Sheet K	1	2	3	4	5	6	7	8	9	10	Final
Germany (Jahr) 🔨	0	1	1	0	0	2	0	5	X	X	9
Italy (Mosaner)	0	0	0	0	2	0	1	0	X	X	3

=== Group C ===
The Group C competitions were contested in Tårnby. Eight men's teams competed for two berths to the Group B competitions in Stavanger. The teams played a single round robin, and at its conclusion, the top four teams advanced to the playoffs, which were held in a format similar to that of the World Wheelchair Curling Championship qualification events. Wales and Romania advanced to the Group B competitions in Stavanger.

==== Round-robin standings ====
Final round-robin standings

Key
Teams to Playoffs

Country	Skip	W	L
Wales	Adrian Meikle	6	1
Romania	Bogdan Colceriu	5	2
Slovenia	Lan Žagar	5	2
Serbia	Đorđe Nešković	4	3
Belarus	Pavel Petrov	3	4
Ireland	Alan Mitchell	3	4
Luxembourg	Jörg Moeser	2	5
Iceland	Ólafur Hreinsson	0	7

==== Playoffs ====
Second Place Game
2	Romania	9
4	Serbia	5

Semifinals
1	Wales	8
2	Romania	5
3	Slovenia	4
4	Serbia	9

== Women ==
=== Group A ===
The Group A competitions were contested in Stavanger.

==== Round-robin standings ====
Final round-robin standings

Key
Teams to Playoffs
Teams to Tiebreakers
Teams relegated to 2014 Group B

Country	Skip	W	L
Scotland	Eve Muirhead	9	0
Switzerland	Mirjam Ott	7	2
Sweden	Margaretha Sigfridsson	6	3
Russia	Anna Sidorova	6	3
Denmark	Lene Nielsen	6	3
Czech Republic	Anna Kubešková	4	5
Latvia	Evita Regža	3	6
Germany	Andrea Schöpp	2	7
Norway	Marianne Rørvik	1	8
Italy	Veronica Zappone	1	8

Sweden won the draw-to-the-button challenge and were given the third seed. Russia and Denmark played a tiebreaker game for the fourth seed.

==== Playoffs ====
Page playoff system
1	Scotland	10
2	Switzerland	3
3	Sweden	10
4	Denmark	2

Semifinal
2	Switzerland	6
3	Sweden	7

Final
1	Scotland	5
3	Sweden	10

Bronze-medal game
2	Switzerland	6
4	Denmark	4

===== Bronze-medal game =====
Saturday, November 30, 10:00

Sheet C	1	2	3	4	5	6	7	8	9	10	Final
Switzerland (Ott) 🔨	0	2	0	0	2	1	0	0	1	X	6
Denmark (Nielsen)	1	0	0	1	0	0	2	0	0	X	4

Player percentages
Switzerland		Denmark	
Janine Greiner	86%	Maria Poulsen	85%
Alina Pätz	86%	Jeanne Ellegaard	73%
Carmen Schäfer	88%	Helle Simonsen	73%
Mirjam Ott	81%	Lene Nielsen	80%
Total	85%	Total	78%

==== Final ====
Saturday, November 30, 10:00

Sheet D	1	2	3	4	5	6	7	8	9	10	Final
Scotland (Muirhead)🔨	0	1	0	0	2	1	0	1	0	0	5
Sweden (Sigfridsson)	1	0	3	0	0	0	2	0	1	3	10

Player percentages
Scotland		Sweden	
Claire Hamilton	81%	Margaretha Sigfridsson	88%
Vicki Adams	75%	Maria Wennerström	75%
Anna Sloan	75%	Christina Bertrup	79%
Eve Muirhead	69%	Maria Prytz	74%
Total	75%	Total	79%

=== Group B ===
The Group B competitions were contested in Stavanger.

==== Round-robin standings ====
Final round-robin standings

Key
Teams to Playoffs
Teams to Tiebreakers
Countries relegated to 2013 Group C

Country	Skip	W	L
Estonia	Maile Mölder	7	2
Finland	Sanna Puustinen	7	2
England	Anna Fowler	6	3
Austria	Constanze Hummelt	5	4
Turkey	Elif Kızılkaya	5	4
Hungary	Ildikó Szekeres	5	4
Belarus	Alina Pavlyuchik	3	6
Poland	Elżbieta Ran	3	6
Slovenia	Valentina Jurinčič	2	7
Spain	Irantzu García	2	7

==== Playoffs ====
Page playoff system
1	Estonia	3
2	Finland	8
3	England	12
4	Austria	7

Semifinal
2	Estonia	7
3	England	2

Final
1	Finland	9
2	Estonia	8

Bronze-medal game
3	England	7
4	Austria	5

===== Bronze-medal game =====
Friday, November 29, 12:00

Sheet D	1	2	3	4	5	6	7	8	9	10	Final
England (Fowler) 🔨	0	2	1	0	2	0	1	0	0	1	7
Austria (Hummelt)	1	0	0	1	0	1	0	2	0	0	5

===== Final =====
Friday, November 29, 12:00

Sheet B	1	2	3	4	5	6	7	8	9	10	11	Final
Finland (Puustinen) 🔨	4	0	0	0	0	2	0	1	0	1	1	9
Estonia (Mölder)	0	2	1	1	0	0	0	0	4	0	0	8

=== Group C ===
The Group C competitions were contested in Tårnby. Four women's teams competed for two berths to the Group B competitions in Stavanger. The teams played a double round robin, and at its conclusion, the top three teams advanced to the playoffs. Belarus and Slovenia advanced to the Group B competitions in Stavanger.

==== Round-robin standings ====
Final round-robin standings

Key
Teams to Playoffs
Teams to Tiebreaker

Country	Skip	W	L
Slovenia	Valentina Jurinčič	5	1
Belarus	Alina Pavlyuchik	3	3
Slovakia	Monika Kristofcakova	2	4
Croatia	Iva Penava	2	4

==== Playoffs ====
Second Place Game			First Place Game
			1	Slovenia	8
1	Slovenia	8	2	Belarus	9
3	Slovakia	6
