= Carmen Schäfer (curler) =

Swiss curler

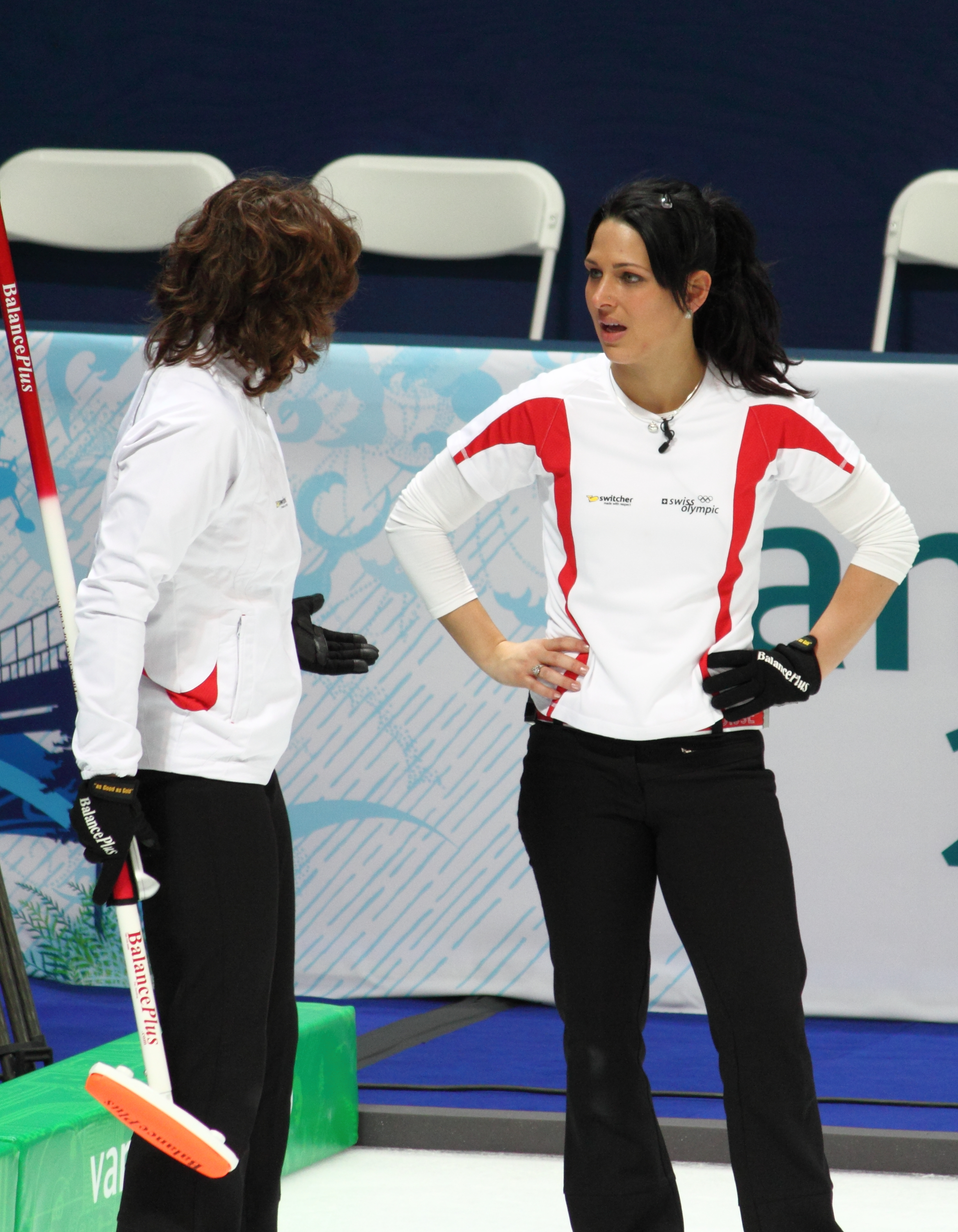
- Carmen Schäfer (right) with Mirjam Ott (left) at the 2010 Winter Olympics

Medal record

Curling

World Junior Championships
Gold medal – first place	1999 Östersund	
Bronze medal – third place	2001 Ogden	

World Championships
Gold medal – first place	2012 Lethbridge	
Bronze medal – third place	2008 Vernon	

European Championships
Gold medal – first place	2008 Örnsköldsvik	
Silver medal – second place	2009 Aberdeen	
Bronze medal – third place	2010 Campéry	
Bronze medal – third place	2013 Stavanger	

Carmen Schäfer (born 8 January 1981 in Davos) is a Swiss curler. She plays third for Mirjam Ott.

Schäfer had a fairly successful Junior career. She was the alternate on the Swiss team (skipped by Silvana Tirinzoni) that won the 1999 World Junior Championships, but she did not play any games. Schäfer skipped the Swiss team at the 2000 and 2001 World Juniors, finishing fourth and winning the bronze medal respectively. In 2000, she lost to the U.S. team (skipped by Laura Delaney) in the bronze medal game, 8–5. She had to beat Moe Meguro's Japanese team to capture the bronze in 2001, winning the game 5–4.

In 2007, Schäfer joined Ott's team. They finished in fourth place at the 2007 European Curling Championships. They avenged their defeat at the 2008 Ford World Women's Curling Championship when they won the bronze medal; once again she had to beat Japan and their skip, Meguro. The Japanese had beaten them in the 3–4 game, but had slipped in the bronze medal rematch.

At the 2010 Vancouver Olympic Games, her team, again skipped by Mirjam Ott, finished in fourth place, as Ott's touch completely deserted her late in the semi-final and bronze medal matches.

In 2008, Schäfer played in the Continental Cup of Curling.

Season	Skip	Third	Second	Lead	Alternate	Events
1998–99	Silvana Tirinzoni	Michèle Knobel	Brigitte Schori	Martina von Arx	Carmen Schäfer	1999 WJCC
1999–2000	Janine Greiner	Carmen Schäfer	Jacqueline Greiner	Barbara Appenzeller	Anna Neuenschwander	2000 WJCC
2007–08	Mirjam Ott	Carmen Schäfer	Valeria Spälty	Janine Greiner	Carmen Küng	2007 ECC, 2008 WCC
2008–09	Mirjam Ott	Carmen Schäfer	Valeria Spälty	Janine Greiner	Carmen Küng	2008 ECC, 2009 WCC
2009–10	Mirjam Ott	Carmen Schäfer	Carmen Küng	Janine Greiner	Binia Feltscher-Beeli	2009 ECC
