= Janine Greiner =

Swiss curler

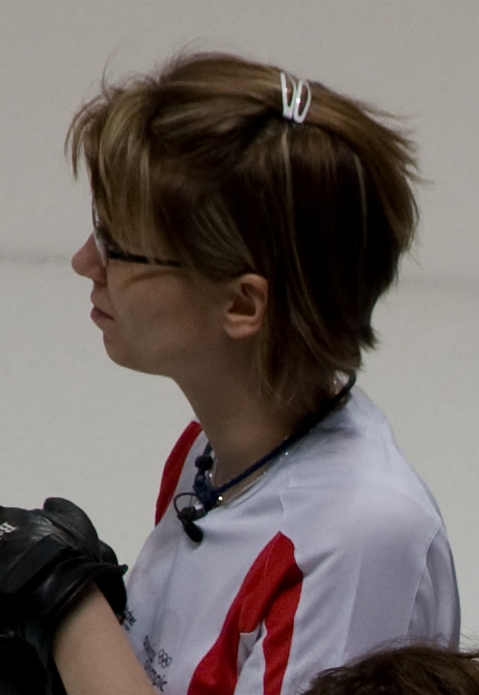

Personal information
- Born: 13 February 1981 (age 45)

Sport
- Country: Switzerland
- Sport: Curling
Medal record
World Championships
Gold medal – first place	2012 Lethbridge
Bronze medal – third place	2008 Vernon
World Junior Championships
Bronze medal – third place	2001 Ogden
European Championships
Gold medal – first place	2008 Örnsköldsvik
Silver medal – second place	2009 Aberdeen
Bronze medal – third place	2006 Basel
Bronze medal – third place	2010 Campéry
Bronze medal – third place	2013 Stavanger

Janine Greiner (born 13 February 1981) is a Swiss curler.

Greiner started curling in 1989. She plays lead for Mirjam Ott and is right-handed.

== Teammates ==
2010 Vancouver Olympic Games

Mirjam Ott, Skip

Carmen Schäfer, Third

Carmen Küng, Second

Irene Schori, Alternate
