= Anna Domeij =

Swedish curler

Anna Domeij Team in 2009-10, career on hiatus
- Curler
- Born: 27 June 1987 (age 39)

Team
- Curling club: Karlstads CK
- Skip: Cecilia Östlund
- Third: Sara Carlsson
- Second: Anna Domeij
- Lead: Liselotta Lennartsson
- Alternate: Sabina Kraupp

Curling career
- World Championship: 1 (2010)
Medal record
Curling
Representing Sweden
World Junior Curling Championships
Silver medal – second place	2008 Östersund	Team

Anna Domeij (born 27 June 1987) is a Swedish curler. She was second for the Swedish team at the 2008 World Junior Curling Championships in Östersund, winning a silver medal. She is second for the Swedish team at the 2010 Ford World Women's Curling Championship in Swift Current, Canada.
