= 2015 Curlers Corner Autumn Gold Curling Classic =

World Curling Tour event

- Host city: Calgary, Alberta
- Arena: Calgary Curling Club
- Dates: October 9–12
- Winner: (Ontario) Team Homan
- Curling club: Ottawa CC, Ottawa
- Skip: Rachel Homan
- Third: Emma Miskew
- Second: Joanne Courtney
- Lead: Lisa Weagle
- Finalist: (Alberta) Chelsea Carey

The 2015 Curlers Corner Autumn Gold Curling Classic was held from October 9 to 12 at the Calgary Curling Club in Calgary, Alberta as part of the World Curling Tour. The event was held in a triple-knockout format with a purse of $50,000.

In the final, Rachel Homan and her rink from Ottawa defeated Chelsea Carey's Calgary rink to win the event. Homan dropped into the last chance C event early on in the tournament, and won six straight games to capture the title.

== Teams ==
The teams are listed as follows:

| Skip | Third | Second | Lead | Locale |
|---|---|---|---|---|
| Sherry Anderson | Jessica Hanson | Elyse Lafrance | Brie Spilchen | Delisle, Saskatchewan |
| Brett Barber | Robyn Despins | Rachel Fritzer | Meaghan Frerichs | Biggar, Saskatchewan |
| Chelsea Carey | Amy Nixon | Jocelyn Peterman | Laine Peters | Calgary, Alberta |
| Nadine Chyz | Heather Jensen | Whitney Eckstrand | Heather Rogers | Calgary, Alberta |
| Kristie Moore (Note: Kristie Moore spared for Chantelle Eberle.) | Cindy Ricci | Larisa Murray | Debbie Lozinski | Regina, Saskatchewan |
| Kerri Einarson | Selena Kaatz | Liz Fyfe | Kristin MacCuish | Winnipeg, Manitoba |
| Michelle Englot | Candace Chisholm | Stephanie Schmidt | Brooklyn Lemon | Regina, Saskatchewan |
| Tracy Fleury | Jenn Horgan | Jenna Walsh | Amanda Gates | Sudbury, Ontario |
| Satsuki Fujisawa | Mari Motohashi | Chinami Yoshida | Yumi Suzuki | Kitami, Japan |
| Gim Un-chi | Lee Seul-bee | Um Min-ji | Yeom Yoon-jung | Gyeonggi-do, South Korea |
| Rachel Homan | Emma Miskew | Joanne Courtney | Lisa Weagle | Ottawa, Ontario |
| Rina Ida | Tamami Naito | Mao Ishigaki | Natsuko Ishiyama | Sapporo, Japan |
| Michèle Jäggi | Michelle Gribi | Stéphanie Jäggi | Vera Camponovo | Bern, Switzerland |
| Jennifer Jones | Kaitlyn Lawes | Jill Officer | Dawn McEwen | Winnipeg, Manitoba |
| Jessie Kaufman | Erin Carmody | Lynnelle Mahe | Kim Curtin | Edmonton, Alberta |
| Nicky Kaufman | Holly Baird | Deena Benoit | Pam Appelman | Edmonton, Alberta |
| Shannon Kleibrink | Lisa Eyamie | Sarah Wilkes | Alison Kotylak | Calgary, Alberta |
| Patti Lank | Maureen Stolt | Mackenzie Lank | Anna Bauman | Lewiston, United States |
| Stefanie Lawton | Trish Paulsen | Sherri Singler | Marliese Kasner | Saskatoon, Saskatchewan |
| Jodi Marthaller | Teesa Ruetz | Nicole Larson | Valerie Ekelund | Calgary, Alberta |
| Michelle Montford | Lisa DeRiviere | Sara Van Walleghem | Sarah Neufeld | Winnipeg, Manitoba |
| Ayumi Ogasawara | Sayaka Yoshimura | Kaho Onodera | Anna Ohmiya | Sapporo, Japan |
| Cissi Östlund | Sabrina Kraupp | Sara Carlsson | Paulina Stein | Karlstad, Sweden |
| Cathy Overton-Clapham | Briane Meilleur | Katherine Doerksen | Krysten Karwacki | Winnipeg, Manitoba |
| Geri-Lynn Ramsay | Brittany Tran | Becca Konschuh | Claire Tully | Calgary, Alberta |
| Kelsey Rocque | Laura Crocker | Taylor McDonald | Jen Gates | Edmonton, Alberta |
| Casey Scheidegger | Cary-Anne McTaggart | Jessie Scheidegger | Chantal Allan | Lethbridge, Alberta |
| Kelly Scott | Shannon Aleksic | Jenna Loder | Sarah Pyke | Kelowna, British Columbia |
| Barb Spencer | Katie Spencer | Holly Spencer | Sydney Arnal | Sanford, Manitoba |
| Rebecca Stretch | Erica Ott | Jody Keim | Heather Hansen | Calgary, Alberta |
| Val Sweeting | Lori Olson-Johns | Dana Ferguson | Rachelle Brown | Edmonton, Alberta |
| Jill Thurston | Brette Richards | Kristen Foster | Blaine de Jager | Winnipeg, Manitoba |

== Knockout brackets ==
=== A event ===
First Knockout
(Alberta) Val Sweeting | 9
(Alberta) Jodi Marthaller | 2
(Saskatchewan) Team Eberle | 3
(Japan) Satsuki Fujisawa | 8
(Alberta) Chelsea Carey | 4
(Alberta) Nadine Chyz | 2
(Manitoba) Barb Spencer | 9
(Alberta) Shannon Kleibrink | 3
(Ontario) Rachel Homan | 9
(Alberta) Jessie Kaufman | 2
(Alberta) Casey Scheidegger | 4
(Saskatchewan) Stefanie Lawton | 6
(Alberta) Kelsey Rocque | 8
(South Korea) Gim Un-chi | 3
(Manitoba) Michelle Montford | 6
(Alberta) Nicky Kaufman | 1

Quarterfinals
(Alberta) Val Sweeting | 5
(Japan) Satsuki Fujisawa | 3
(Alberta) Chelsea Carey | 5
(Manitoba) Barb Spencer | 4
(Ontario) Rachel Homan | 6
(Saskatchewan) Stefanie Lawton | 8
(Alberta) Kelsey Rocque | 4
(Manitoba) Michelle Montford | 2

Semifinals
(Alberta) Val Sweeting | 3
(Alberta) Chelsea Carey | 2
(Saskatchewan) Stefanie Lawton | 5
(Alberta) Kelsey Rocque | 4

Qualifier 1
(Alberta) Val Sweeting | 7
(Saskatchewan) Stefanie Lawton | 4

First Knockout
(Manitoba) Jennifer Jones | 8
(Alberta) Rebecca Stretch | 2
(Saskatchewan) Michelle Englot | 4
(Sweden) Cissi Östlund | 7
(Manitoba) Jill Thurston | 5
(Saskatchewan) Sherry Anderson | 6
(Switzerland) Michèle Jäggi | 5
(Alberta) Geri-Lynn Ramsay | 6
(Ontario) Tracy Fleury | 6
(Saskatchewan) Brett Barber | 2
(Manitoba) Kerri Einarson | 5
(United States) Patti Lank | 6
(Japan) Ayumi Ogasawara | 7
(Japan) Rina Ida | 4
(Manitoba) Cathy Overton-Clapham | 7
(British Columbia) Kelly Scott | 6

Quarterfinals
(Manitoba) Jennifer Jones | 3
(Sweden) Cissi Östlund | 7
(Saskatchewan) Sherry Anderson | 6
(Alberta) Geri-Lynn Ramsay | 4
(Ontario) Tracy Fleury | 8
(United States) Patti Lank | 2
(Japan) Ayumi Ogasawara | 3
(Manitoba) Cathy Overton-Clapham | 6

Semifinals
(Sweden) Cissi Östlund | 2
(Saskatchewan) Sherry Anderson | 7
(Ontario) Tracy Fleury | 6
(Manitoba) Cathy Overton-Clapham | 4

Qualifier 2
(Saskatchewan) Sherry Anderson | 3
(Ontario) Tracy Fleury | 5

=== B event ===
Second Knockout
(Alberta) Jodi Marthaller | 6
(Saskatchewan) Team Eberle | 3
(Alberta) Shannon Kleibrink | 6
(Alberta) Nadine Chyz | 3

Quarterfinals
(Japan) Ayumi Ogasawara | 4
(Alberta) Jodi Marthaller | 5
(United States) Patti Lank | 5
(Alberta) Shannon Kleibrink | 3

Semifinals
(Alberta) Jodi Marthaller | 6
(Sweden) Cissi Östlund | 5
(United States) Patti Lank | 2
(Alberta) Kelsey Rocque | 5

To Qualifier 3
(Alberta) Jodi Marthaller | 2
(Alberta) Kelsey Rocque | 7
Qualifier 3
(Alberta) Kelsey Rocque | 7
(Saskatchewan) Stefanie Lawton | 4

Second Knockout
(Alberta) Jessie Kaufman | 3
(Alberta) Casey Scheidegger | 8
(South Korea) Gim Un-chi | 9
(Alberta) Nicky Kaufman | 1

Quarterfinals
(Alberta) Geri-Lynn Ramsay | 5
(Alberta) Casey Scheidegger | 7
(Manitoba) Jennifer Jones | 8
(South Korea) Gim Un-chi | 5

Semifinals
(Alberta) Casey Scheidegger | 4
(Manitoba) Jennifer Jones | 6

To Qualifier 3
(Manitoba) Jennifer Jones | 7
(Saskatchewan) Stefanie Lawton | 9

Second Knockout
(Alberta) Rebecca Stretch | 7
(Saskatchewan) Michelle Englot | 6
(Manitoba) Jill Thurston | 2
(Switzerland) Michèle Jäggi | 6

Quarterfinals
(Manitoba) Michelle Montford | 7
(Alberta) Rebecca Stretch | 4
(Ontario) Rachel Homan | 3
(Switzerland) Michèle Jäggi | 7

Semifinals
(Manitoba) Michelle Montford | 8
(Manitoba) Cathy Overton-Clapham | 5
(Switzerland) Michèle Jäggi | 6
(Alberta) Chelsea Carey | 5

To Qualifier 4
(Manitoba) Michelle Montford | 3
(Switzerland) Michèle Jäggi | 4
Qualifier 4
(Switzerland) Michèle Jäggi | 8
(British Columbia) Kelly Scott | 5

Second Knockout
(Saskatchewan) Brett Barber | 7
(Manitoba) Kerri Einarson | 8
(Japan) Rina Ida | 5
(British Columbia) Kelly Scott | 8

Quarterfinals
(Manitoba) Barb Spencer | 6
(Manitoba) Kerri Einarson | 5
(Japan) Satsuki Fujisawa | 6
(British Columbia) Kelly Scott | 7

Semifinals
(Manitoba) Barb Spencer | 5
(British Columbia) Kelly Scott | 7

To Qualifier 4
(British Columbia) Kelly Scott | 5
(Saskatchewan) Sherry Anderson | 4

=== C event ===
Third Knockout
(Saskatchewan) Team Eberle | 1
(Alberta) Nadine Chyz | 6
(Alberta) Jessie Kaufman | 7
(Alberta) Nicky Kaufman | 4

Quarterfinals
(Manitoba) Cathy Overton-Clapham | 2
(Alberta) Nadine Chyz | 8
(Alberta) Chelsea Carey | 6
(Alberta) Jessie Kaufman | 3

Semifinals
(Alberta) Nadine Chyz | 4
(Alberta) Chelsea Carey | 7

Qualifier 5
(Alberta) Chelsea Carey | 6
(Saskatchewan) Stefanie Lawton | 2

Third Knockout
(Alberta) Geri-Lynn Ramsay | 1
(South Korea) Gim Un-chi | 7

Quarterfinals
(Japan) Ayumi Ogasawara | 4
(Alberta) Shannon Kleibrink | 8
(Manitoba) Barb Spencer | 3
(South Korea) Gim Un-chi | 9

Semifinals
(Alberta) Shannon Kleibrink | 9
(Saskatchewan) Sherry Anderson | 1
(South Korea) Gim Un-chi | 3
(Manitoba) Michelle Montford | 7

Qualifier 6
(Alberta) Shannon Kleibrink | 6
(Manitoba) Michelle Montford | 5

Third Knockout
(Manitoba) Kerri Einarson | 3
(Japan) Satsuki Fujisawa | 6

Quarterfinals
(Alberta) Casey Scheidegger | 5
(Japan) Satsuki Fujisawa | 4
(Alberta) Rebecca Stretch | 4
(Ontario) Rachel Homan | 8

Semifinals
(Alberta) Casey Scheidegger | 6
(Alberta) Jodi Marthaller | 4
(Ontario) Rachel Homan | 8
(Manitoba) Jennifer Jones | 3

Qualifier 7
(Alberta) Casey Scheidegger | 2
(Ontario) Rachel Homan | 6

Third Knockout
(Saskatchewan) Michelle Englot | 9
(Manitoba) Jill Thurston | 3
(Saskatchewan) Brett Barber | 6
(Japan) Rina Ida | 4

Quarterfinals
(Sweden) Cissi Östlund | 9
(Saskatchewan) Michelle Englot | 2
(United States) Patti Lank | 6
(Saskatchewan) Brett Barber | 7

Semifinals
(Sweden) Cissi Östlund | 6
(Saskatchewan) Brett Barber | 5

Qualifier 8
(Sweden) Cissi Östlund | 6
(British Columbia) Kelly Scott | 3

== Knockout results ==
All draw times listed in Mountain Time (UTC−07:00).

=== Draw 1 ===
Friday, October 9, 9:30 am

| Team | 1 | 2 | 3 | 4 | 5 | 6 | 7 | 8 | Final |
| (Alberta) Val Sweeting | 0 | 2 | 2 | 0 | 3 | 2 | X | X | 9 |
| (Alberta) Jodi Marthaller | 1 | 0 | 0 | 1 | 0 | 0 | X | X | 2 |

| Team | 1 | 2 | 3 | 4 | 5 | 6 | 7 | 8 | Final |
| (Saskatchewan) Team Eberle 🔨 | 0 | 2 | 1 | 0 | 0 | 0 | 0 | X | 3 |
| (Japan) Satsuki Fujisawa | 1 | 0 | 0 | 2 | 2 | 1 | 2 | X | 8 |

| Team | 1 | 2 | 3 | 4 | 5 | 6 | 7 | 8 | Final |
| (Alberta) Chelsea Carey 🔨 | 0 | 0 | 1 | 0 | 0 | 0 | 3 | X | 4 |
| (Alberta) Nadine Chyz | 0 | 0 | 0 | 1 | 0 | 1 | 0 | X | 2 |

| Team | 1 | 2 | 3 | 4 | 5 | 6 | 7 | 8 | Final |
| (Manitoba) Barb Spencer | 0 | 3 | 0 | 2 | 0 | 4 | X | X | 9 |
| (Alberta) Shannon Kleibrink 🔨 | 1 | 0 | 1 | 0 | 1 | 0 | X | X | 3 |

| Team | 1 | 2 | 3 | 4 | 5 | 6 | 7 | 8 | Final |
| (Ontario) Rachel Homan 🔨 | 4 | 0 | 2 | 0 | 1 | 2 | X | X | 8 |
| (Alberta) Jessie Kaufman | 0 | 1 | 0 | 1 | 0 | 0 | X | X | 2 |

| Team | 1 | 2 | 3 | 4 | 5 | 6 | 7 | 8 | Final |
| (Alberta) Casey Scheidegger 🔨 | 0 | 1 | 0 | 1 | 0 | 0 | 2 | 0 | 4 |
| (Saskatchewan) Stefanie Lawton | 0 | 0 | 1 | 0 | 1 | 1 | 0 | 3 | 6 |

| Team | 1 | 2 | 3 | 4 | 5 | 6 | 7 | 8 | Final |
| (Alberta) Kelsey Rocque 🔨 | 3 | 0 | 0 | 3 | 0 | 2 | X | X | 8 |
| (South Korea) Gim Un-chi | 0 | 2 | 0 | 0 | 1 | 0 | X | X | 3 |

| Team | 1 | 2 | 3 | 4 | 5 | 6 | 7 | 8 | Final |
| (Manitoba) Michelle Montford 🔨 | 0 | 3 | 1 | 1 | 0 | 1 | X | X | 6 |
| (Alberta) Nicky Kaufman | 0 | 0 | 0 | 0 | 1 | 0 | X | X | 1 |

=== Draw 2 ===
Friday, October 9, 1:15 pm

| Team | 1 | 2 | 3 | 4 | 5 | 6 | 7 | 8 | Final |
| (Manitoba) Jennifer Jones 🔨 | 2 | 1 | 1 | 0 | 3 | 1 | X | X | 8 |
| (Alberta) Rebecca Stretch | 0 | 0 | 0 | 2 | 0 | 0 | X | X | 2 |

| Team | 1 | 2 | 3 | 4 | 5 | 6 | 7 | 8 | Final |
| (Saskatchewan) Michelle Englot 🔨 | 1 | 0 | 0 | 0 | 2 | 0 | 1 | X | 4 |
| (Sweden) Cissi Östlund | 0 | 1 | 2 | 3 | 0 | 1 | 0 | X | 7 |

| Team | 1 | 2 | 3 | 4 | 5 | 6 | 7 | 8 | Final |
| (Manitoba) Jill Thurston 🔨 | 1 | 0 | 0 | 2 | 0 | 1 | 0 | 1 | 5 |
| (Saskatchewan) Sherry Anderson | 0 | 1 | 2 | 0 | 2 | 0 | 1 | 0 | 6 |

| Team | 1 | 2 | 3 | 4 | 5 | 6 | 7 | 8 | 9 | Final |
| (Switzerland) Michèle Jäggi | 1 | 0 | 0 | 2 | 1 | 0 | 1 | 0 | 0 | 5 |
| (Alberta) Geri-Lynn Ramsay 🔨 | 0 | 2 | 0 | 0 | 0 | 1 | 0 | 2 | 1 | 6 |

| Team | 1 | 2 | 3 | 4 | 5 | 6 | 7 | 8 | Final |
| (Ontario) Tracy Fleury 🔨 | 3 | 0 | 1 | 0 | 0 | 1 | 1 | X | 6 |
| (Saskatchewan) Brett Barber | 0 | 1 | 0 | 1 | 0 | 0 | 0 | X | 2 |

| Team | 1 | 2 | 3 | 4 | 5 | 6 | 7 | 8 | 9 | Final |
| (Manitoba) Kerri Einarson | 0 | 0 | 0 | 1 | 1 | 1 | 0 | 2 | 0 | 5 |
| (United States) Patti Lank 🔨 | 0 | 1 | 2 | 0 | 0 | 0 | 2 | 0 | 1 | 6 |

| Team | 1 | 2 | 3 | 4 | 5 | 6 | 7 | 8 | Final |
| (Japan) Ayumi Ogasawara | 0 | 0 | 1 | 1 | 5 | 0 | 0 | 0 | 7 |
| (Japan) Rina Ida 🔨 | 1 | 0 | 0 | 0 | 0 | 1 | 1 | 1 | 4 |

| Team | 1 | 2 | 3 | 4 | 5 | 6 | 7 | 8 | 9 | Final |
| (Manitoba) Cathy Overton-Clapham 🔨 | 1 | 0 | 2 | 0 | 0 | 0 | 3 | 0 | 1 | 7 |
| (British Columbia) Kelly Scott | 0 | 2 | 0 | 2 | 1 | 0 | 0 | 1 | 0 | 6 |

=== Draw 3 ===
Friday, October 9, 5:15 pm

| Team | 1 | 2 | 3 | 4 | 5 | 6 | 7 | 8 | 9 | Final |
| (Alberta) Val Sweeting | 0 | 0 | 0 | 1 | 2 | 0 | 0 | 0 | 2 | 5 |
| (Japan) Satsuki Fujisawa 🔨 | 0 | 1 | 1 | 0 | 0 | 0 | 0 | 1 | 0 | 3 |

| Team | 1 | 2 | 3 | 4 | 5 | 6 | 7 | 8 | Final |
| (Alberta) Chelsea Carey | 1 | 1 | 0 | 1 | 0 | 2 | 0 | X | 5 |
| (Manitoba) Barb Spencer 🔨 | 0 | 0 | 1 | 0 | 1 | 0 | 2 | X | 4 |

| Team | 1 | 2 | 3 | 4 | 5 | 6 | 7 | 8 | Final |
| (Ontario) Rachel Homan 🔨 | 2 | 0 | 3 | 0 | 0 | 1 | 0 | 0 | 6 |
| (Saskatchewan) Stefanie Lawton | 0 | 2 | 0 | 0 | 1 | 0 | 3 | 2 | 8 |

| Team | 1 | 2 | 3 | 4 | 5 | 6 | 7 | 8 | Final |
| (Alberta) Kelsey Rocque 🔨 | 1 | 0 | 1 | 0 | 1 | 0 | 0 | 1 | 4 |
| (Manitoba) Michelle Montford | 0 | 1 | 0 | 0 | 0 | 0 | 1 | 0 | 2 |

| Team | 1 | 2 | 3 | 4 | 5 | 6 | 7 | 8 | Final |
| (Alberta) Jodi Marthaller | 3 | 0 | 1 | 0 | 0 | 1 | 1 | X | 6 |
| (Saskatchewan) Team Eberle 🔨 | 0 | 1 | 0 | 1 | 1 | 0 | 0 | X | 3 |

| Team | 1 | 2 | 3 | 4 | 5 | 6 | 7 | 8 | Final |
| (Alberta) Shannon Kleibrink | 1 | 1 | 0 | 1 | 1 | 1 | 0 | 1 | 6 |
| (Alberta) Nadine Chyz 🔨 | 0 | 0 | 1 | 0 | 0 | 0 | 2 | 0 | 3 |

| Team | 1 | 2 | 3 | 4 | 5 | 6 | 7 | 8 | Final |
| (Alberta) Jessie Kaufman | 0 | 2 | 0 | 0 | 1 | 0 | X | X | 3 |
| (Alberta) Casey Scheidegger 🔨 | 3 | 0 | 2 | 1 | 0 | 2 | X | X | 8 |

| Team | 1 | 2 | 3 | 4 | 5 | 6 | 7 | 8 | Final |
| (South Korea) Gim Un-chi | 0 | 2 | 4 | 3 | X | X | X | X | 9 |
| (Alberta) Nicky Kaufman 🔨 | 1 | 0 | 0 | 0 | X | X | X | X | 1 |

=== Draw 4 ===
Friday, October 9, 9:00 pm

| Team | 1 | 2 | 3 | 4 | 5 | 6 | 7 | 8 | Final |
| (Manitoba) Jennifer Jones | 0 | 2 | 0 | 1 | 0 | 0 | 0 | 0 | 3 |
| (Sweden) Cissi Östlund 🔨 | 1 | 0 | 0 | 0 | 1 | 1 | 1 | 3 | 7 |

| Team | 1 | 2 | 3 | 4 | 5 | 6 | 7 | 8 | Final |
| (Saskatchewan) Sherry Anderson 🔨 | 1 | 0 | 2 | 0 | 1 | 0 | 2 | X | 6 |
| (Alberta) Geri-Lynn Ramsay | 0 | 2 | 0 | 1 | 0 | 1 | 0 | X | 4 |

| Team | 1 | 2 | 3 | 4 | 5 | 6 | 7 | 8 | Final |
| (Ontario) Tracy Fleury | 0 | 2 | 2 | 1 | 0 | 1 | 2 | X | 8 |
| (United States) Patti Lank 🔨 | 1 | 0 | 0 | 0 | 1 | 0 | 0 | X | 2 |

| Team | 1 | 2 | 3 | 4 | 5 | 6 | 7 | 8 | Final |
| (Japan) Ayumi Ogasawara 🔨 | 0 | 1 | 0 | 1 | 0 | 0 | 1 | X | 3 |
| (Manitoba) Cathy Overton-Clapham | 2 | 0 | 1 | 0 | 2 | 1 | 0 | X | 6 |

| Team | 1 | 2 | 3 | 4 | 5 | 6 | 7 | 8 | 9 | Final |
| (Alberta) Rebecca Stretch | 0 | 0 | 2 | 0 | 1 | 0 | 3 | 0 | 1 | 7 |
| (Saskatchewan) Michelle Englot 🔨 | 1 | 1 | 0 | 1 | 0 | 2 | 0 | 1 | 0 | 6 |

| Team | 1 | 2 | 3 | 4 | 5 | 6 | 7 | 8 | Final |
| (Manitoba) Jill Thurston | 0 | 0 | 1 | 0 | 0 | 1 | 0 | X | 2 |
| (Switzerland) Michèle Jäggi 🔨 | 1 | 1 | 0 | 1 | 1 | 0 | 2 | X | 6 |

| Team | 1 | 2 | 3 | 4 | 5 | 6 | 7 | 8 | 9 | Final |
| (Saskatchewan) Brett Barber 🔨 | 0 | 1 | 0 | 2 | 0 | 1 | 0 | 3 | 0 | 7 |
| (Manitoba) Kerri Einarson | 2 | 0 | 2 | 0 | 2 | 0 | 1 | 0 | 1 | 8 |

| Team | 1 | 2 | 3 | 4 | 5 | 6 | 7 | 8 | Final |
| (Japan) Rina Ida | 0 | 2 | 0 | 1 | 0 | 2 | 0 | X | 5 |
| (British Columbia) Kelly Scott 🔨 | 1 | 0 | 3 | 0 | 3 | 0 | 1 | X | 8 |

=== Draw 5 ===
Saturday, October 10, 9:00 am

| Team | 1 | 2 | 3 | 4 | 5 | 6 | 7 | 8 | Final |
| (Alberta) Val Sweeting | 0 | 0 | 0 | 1 | 2 | 0 | 0 | X | 3 |
| (Alberta) Chelsea Carey 🔨 | 0 | 1 | 0 | 0 | 0 | 0 | 1 | X | 2 |

| Team | 1 | 2 | 3 | 4 | 5 | 6 | 7 | 8 | Final |
| (Saskatchewan) Stefanie Lawton 🔨 | 0 | 0 | 2 | 0 | 0 | 0 | 3 | 0 | 5 |
| (Alberta) Kelsey Rocque | 0 | 0 | 0 | 0 | 0 | 2 | 0 | 2 | 4 |

| Team | 1 | 2 | 3 | 4 | 5 | 6 | 7 | 8 | Final |
| (Japan) Ayumi Ogasawara | 0 | 1 | 0 | 1 | 1 | 1 | 0 | 0 | 4 |
| (Alberta) Jodi Marthaller 🔨 | 1 | 0 | 2 | 0 | 0 | 0 | 1 | 1 | 5 |

| Team | 1 | 2 | 3 | 4 | 5 | 6 | 7 | 8 | Final |
| (United States) Patti Lank | 0 | 1 | 2 | 1 | 0 | 1 | 0 | 0 | 5 |
| (Alberta) Shannon Kleibrink 🔨 | 0 | 0 | 0 | 0 | 1 | 0 | 1 | 1 | 3 |

| Team | 1 | 2 | 3 | 4 | 5 | 6 | 7 | 8 | Final |
| (Alberta) Geri-Lynn Ramsay | 0 | 1 | 0 | 2 | 1 | 0 | 1 | 0 | 5 |
| (Alberta) Casey Scheidegger 🔨 | 1 | 0 | 3 | 0 | 0 | 2 | 0 | 1 | 7 |

| Team | 1 | 2 | 3 | 4 | 5 | 6 | 7 | 8 | Final |
| (Manitoba) Jennifer Jones 🔨 | 3 | 1 | 0 | 0 | 2 | 1 | 0 | 1 | 8 |
| (South Korea) Gim Un-chi | 0 | 0 | 2 | 1 | 0 | 0 | 1 | 0 | 5 |

=== Draw 6 ===
Saturday, October 10, 12:45 pm

| Team | 1 | 2 | 3 | 4 | 5 | 6 | 7 | 8 | Final |
| (Sweden) Cissi Östlund | 0 | 0 | 1 | 1 | 0 | 0 | 0 | X | 2 |
| (Saskatchewan) Sherry Anderson 🔨 | 0 | 1 | 0 | 0 | 2 | 3 | 1 | X | 7 |

| Team | 1 | 2 | 3 | 4 | 5 | 6 | 7 | 8 | Final |
| (Ontario) Tracy Fleury 🔨 | 0 | 0 | 3 | 1 | 0 | 1 | 0 | 1 | 6 |
| (Manitoba) Cathy Overton-Clapham | 0 | 1 | 0 | 0 | 2 | 0 | 1 | 0 | 4 |

| Team | 1 | 2 | 3 | 4 | 5 | 6 | 7 | 8 | Final |
| (Manitoba) Michelle Montford | 0 | 1 | 1 | 0 | 4 | 1 | 0 | X | 7 |
| (Alberta) Rebecca Stretch 🔨 | 1 | 0 | 0 | 2 | 0 | 0 | 1 | X | 4 |

| Team | 1 | 2 | 3 | 4 | 5 | 6 | 7 | 8 | Final |
| (Ontario) Rachel Homan 🔨 | 0 | 0 | 3 | 0 | 0 | 0 | X | X | 3 |
| (Switzerland) Michèle Jäggi | 0 | 3 | 0 | 1 | 1 | 2 | X | X | 7 |

| Team | 1 | 2 | 3 | 4 | 5 | 6 | 7 | 8 | 9 | Final |
| (Manitoba) Barb Spencer | 0 | 0 | 0 | 3 | 2 | 0 | 0 | 0 | 1 | 6 |
| (Manitoba) Kerri Einarson 🔨 | 0 | 1 | 1 | 0 | 0 | 1 | 1 | 1 | 0 | 5 |

| Team | 1 | 2 | 3 | 4 | 5 | 6 | 7 | 8 | Final |
| (Japan) Satsuki Fujisawa 🔨 | 0 | 2 | 0 | 2 | 0 | 2 | 0 | 0 | 6 |
| (British Columbia) Kelly Scott | 1 | 0 | 2 | 0 | 2 | 0 | 1 | 1 | 7 |

=== Draw 7 ===
Saturday, October 10, 4:30 pm

| Team | 1 | 2 | 3 | 4 | 5 | 6 | 7 | 8 | Final |
| (Alberta) Val Sweeting 🔨 | 0 | 3 | 0 | 1 | 1 | 0 | 1 | 1 | 7 |
| (Saskatchewan) Stefanie Lawton | 0 | 0 | 2 | 0 | 0 | 2 | 0 | 0 | 4 |

| Team | 1 | 2 | 3 | 4 | 5 | 6 | 7 | 8 | Final |
| (Alberta) Jodi Marthaller | 0 | 1 | 0 | 0 | 1 | 2 | 1 | 1 | 6 |
| (Sweden) Cissi Östlund 🔨 | 3 | 0 | 0 | 2 | 0 | 0 | 0 | 0 | 5 |

| Team | 1 | 2 | 3 | 4 | 5 | 6 | 7 | 8 | Final |
| (United States) Patti Lank | 0 | 0 | 1 | 1 | 0 | 0 | X | X | 2 |
| (Alberta) Kelsey Rocque 🔨 | 0 | 1 | 0 | 0 | 0 | 4 | X | X | 5 |

| Team | 1 | 2 | 3 | 4 | 5 | 6 | 7 | 8 | Final |
| (Alberta) Casey Scheidegger | 0 | 2 | 0 | 1 | 1 | 0 | 0 | 0 | 4 |
| (Manitoba) Jennifer Jones 🔨 | 1 | 0 | 2 | 0 | 0 | 1 | 1 | 1 | 6 |

| Team | 1 | 2 | 3 | 4 | 5 | 6 | 7 | 8 | Final |
| (Alberta) Geri-Lynn Ramsay | 0 | 1 | 0 | 0 | 0 | 0 | X | X | 1 |
| (South Korea) Gim Un-chi 🔨 | 3 | 0 | 0 | 2 | 1 | 1 | X | X | 7 |

| Team | 1 | 2 | 3 | 4 | 5 | 6 | 7 | 8 | Final |
| (Manitoba) Kerri Einarson | 0 | 1 | 0 | 0 | 2 | 0 | 0 | 0 | 3 |
| (Japan) Satsuki Fujisawa 🔨 | 1 | 0 | 0 | 1 | 0 | 1 | 1 | 2 | 6 |

| Team | 1 | 2 | 3 | 4 | 5 | 6 | 7 | 8 | Final |
| (Saskatchewan) Brett Barber | 1 | 0 | 0 | 0 | 2 | 0 | 2 | 1 | 6 |
| (Japan) Rina Ida 🔨 | 0 | 0 | 1 | 2 | 0 | 1 | 0 | 0 | 4 |

=== Draw 8 ===
Saturday, October 10, 8:15 pm

| Team | 1 | 2 | 3 | 4 | 5 | 6 | 7 | 8 | Final |
| (Saskatchewan) Sherry Anderson | 0 | 0 | 0 | 0 | 1 | 0 | 2 | 0 | 3 |
| (Ontario) Tracy Fleury 🔨 | 1 | 0 | 0 | 1 | 0 | 2 | 0 | 1 | 5 |

| Team | 1 | 2 | 3 | 4 | 5 | 6 | 7 | 8 | Final |
| (Manitoba) Michelle Montford 🔨 | 2 | 0 | 2 | 3 | 0 | 0 | 1 | X | 8 |
| (Manitoba) Cathy Overton-Clapham | 0 | 2 | 0 | 0 | 2 | 1 | 0 | X | 5 |

| Team | 1 | 2 | 3 | 4 | 5 | 6 | 7 | 8 | Final |
| (Switzerland) Michèle Jäggi | 0 | 3 | 0 | 1 | 0 | 1 | 1 | 0 | 6 |
| (Alberta) Chelsea Carey 🔨 | 1 | 0 | 2 | 0 | 0 | 0 | 0 | 2 | 5 |

| Team | 1 | 2 | 3 | 4 | 5 | 6 | 7 | 8 | Final |
| (Manitoba) Barb Spencer | 0 | 1 | 0 | 2 | 0 | 1 | 1 | 0 | 5 |
| (British Columbia) Kelly Scott 🔨 | 2 | 0 | 2 | 0 | 2 | 0 | 0 | 1 | 7 |

| Team | 1 | 2 | 3 | 4 | 5 | 6 | 7 | 8 | Final |
| (Saskatchewan) Team Eberle 🔨 | 1 | 0 | 0 | 0 | 0 | 0 | 0 | X | 1 |
| (Alberta) Nadine Chyz | 0 | 0 | 2 | 1 | 1 | 1 | 1 | X | 6 |

| Team | 1 | 2 | 3 | 4 | 5 | 6 | 7 | 8 | Final |
| (Alberta) Jessie Kaufman 🔨 | 2 | 3 | 0 | 1 | 0 | 1 | 0 | X | 7 |
| (Alberta) Nicky Kaufman | 0 | 0 | 1 | 0 | 1 | 0 | 2 | X | 4 |

| Team | 1 | 2 | 3 | 4 | 5 | 6 | 7 | 8 | Final |
| (Saskatchewan) Michelle Englot 🔨 | 2 | 3 | 1 | 0 | 0 | 3 | X | X | 9 |
| (Manitoba) Jill Thurston | 0 | 0 | 0 | 2 | 1 | 0 | X | X | 3 |

=== Draw 9 ===
Sunday, October 11, 9:00 am

| Team | 1 | 2 | 3 | 4 | 5 | 6 | 7 | 8 | Final |
| (Alberta) Jodi Marthaller | 0 | 0 | 0 | 1 | 1 | 0 | 0 | X | 2 |
| (Alberta) Kelsey Rocque 🔨 | 2 | 1 | 1 | 0 | 0 | 1 | 2 | X | 7 |

| Team | 1 | 2 | 3 | 4 | 5 | 6 | 7 | 8 | Final |
| (Manitoba) Jennifer Jones | 0 | 2 | 0 | 2 | 0 | 3 | 0 | 0 | 7 |
| (Saskatchewan) Stefanie Lawton 🔨 | 4 | 0 | 2 | 0 | 1 | 0 | 1 | 1 | 9 |

| Team | 1 | 2 | 3 | 4 | 5 | 6 | 7 | 8 | Final |
| (Japan) Ayumi Ogasawara | 1 | 0 | 1 | 0 | 2 | 0 | 0 | X | 4 |
| (Alberta) Shannon Kleibrink 🔨 | 0 | 1 | 0 | 2 | 0 | 3 | 2 | X | 8 |

| Team | 1 | 2 | 3 | 4 | 5 | 6 | 7 | 8 | Final |
| (Manitoba) Barb Spencer 🔨 | 1 | 0 | 0 | 2 | 0 | X | X | X | 3 |
| (South Korea) Gim Un-chi | 0 | 2 | 3 | 0 | 4 | X | X | X | 9 |

| Team | 1 | 2 | 3 | 4 | 5 | 6 | 7 | 8 | Final |
| (Alberta) Casey Scheidegger | 0 | 0 | 2 | 0 | 2 | 0 | 0 | 1 | 5 |
| (Japan) Satsuki Fujisawa 🔨 | 0 | 0 | 0 | 2 | 0 | 2 | 0 | 0 | 4 |

| Team | 1 | 2 | 3 | 4 | 5 | 6 | 7 | 8 | Final |
| (Alberta) Rebecca Stretch 🔨 | 2 | 0 | 1 | 0 | 1 | 0 | 0 | X | 4 |
| (Ontario) Rachel Homan | 0 | 2 | 0 | 3 | 0 | 2 | 1 | X | 8 |

| Team | 1 | 2 | 3 | 4 | 5 | 6 | 7 | 8 | Final |
| (United States) Patti Lank 🔨 | 2 | 0 | 1 | 0 | 0 | 2 | 1 | 0 | 6 |
| (Saskatchewan) Brett Barber | 0 | 0 | 0 | 3 | 2 | 0 | 0 | 2 | 7 |

=== Draw 10 ===
Sunday, October 11, 12:45 pm

| Team | 1 | 2 | 3 | 4 | 5 | 6 | 7 | 8 | Final |
| (Manitoba) Michelle Montford | 0 | 1 | 0 | 1 | 0 | 0 | 1 | 0 | 3 |
| (Switzerland) Michèle Jäggi | 0 | 0 | 2 | 0 | 0 | 1 | 0 | 1 | 4 |

| Team | 1 | 2 | 3 | 4 | 5 | 6 | 7 | 8 | Final |
| (British Columbia) Kelly Scott | 1 | 0 | 0 | 2 | 1 | 0 | 1 | 0 | 5 |
| (Saskatchewan) Sherry Anderson | 0 | 0 | 1 | 0 | 0 | 2 | 0 | 1 | 4 |

| Team | 1 | 2 | 3 | 4 | 5 | 6 | 7 | 8 | Final |
| (Alberta) Kelsey Rocque 🔨 | 1 | 3 | 0 | 2 | 0 | 1 | 0 | X | 7 |
| (Saskatchewan) Stefanie Lawton | 0 | 0 | 1 | 0 | 2 | 0 | 1 | X | 4 |

| Team | 1 | 2 | 3 | 4 | 5 | 6 | 7 | 8 | Final |
| (Manitoba) Cathy Overton-Clapham | 0 | 0 | 1 | 0 | 1 | 0 | X | X | 2 |
| (Alberta) Nadine Chyz | 0 | 2 | 0 | 3 | 0 | 3 | X | X | 8 |

| Team | 1 | 2 | 3 | 4 | 5 | 6 | 7 | 8 | Final |
| (Alberta) Chelsea Carey | 0 | 2 | 1 | 0 | 1 | 2 | 0 | X | 6 |
| (Alberta) Jessie Kaufman | 1 | 0 | 0 | 1 | 0 | 0 | 1 | X | 3 |

| Team | 1 | 2 | 3 | 4 | 5 | 6 | 7 | 8 | Final |
| (Sweden) Cissi Östlund | 2 | 4 | 0 | 0 | 3 | X | X | X | 9 |
| (Saskatchewan) Michelle Englot | 0 | 0 | 1 | 1 | 0 | X | X | X | 2 |

=== Draw 11 ===
Sunday, October 11, 4:30 pm

| Team | 1 | 2 | 3 | 4 | 5 | 6 | 7 | 8 | Final |
| (Switzerland) Michèle Jäggi | 0 | 2 | 0 | 0 | 3 | 0 | 2 | 1 | 8 |
| (British Columbia) Kelly Scott 🔨 | 1 | 0 | 2 | 0 | 0 | 2 | 0 | 0 | 5 |

| Team | 1 | 2 | 3 | 4 | 5 | 6 | 7 | 8 | Final |
| (Alberta) Nadine Chyz 🔨 | 2 | 0 | 0 | 0 | 0 | 2 | 0 | X | 4 |
| (Alberta) Chelsea Carey | 0 | 2 | 2 | 0 | 1 | 0 | 2 | X | 7 |

| Team | 1 | 2 | 3 | 4 | 5 | 6 | 7 | 8 | Final |
| (Alberta) Shannon Kleibrink | 0 | 2 | 0 | 3 | 4 | X | X | X | 9 |
| (Saskatchewan) Sherry Anderson 🔨 | 0 | 0 | 1 | 0 | 0 | X | X | X | 1 |

| Team | 1 | 2 | 3 | 4 | 5 | 6 | 7 | 8 | Final |
| (South Korea) Gim Un-chi | 0 | 2 | 0 | 0 | 1 | 0 | 0 | X | 3 |
| (Manitoba) Michelle Montford 🔨 | 1 | 0 | 1 | 1 | 0 | 3 | 1 | X | 7 |

| Team | 1 | 2 | 3 | 4 | 5 | 6 | 7 | 8 | Final |
| (Alberta) Casey Scheidegger 🔨 | 0 | 3 | 0 | 0 | 2 | 0 | 1 | X | 6 |
| (Alberta) Jodi Marthaller | 0 | 0 | 2 | 1 | 0 | 1 | 0 | X | 4 |

| Team | 1 | 2 | 3 | 4 | 5 | 6 | 7 | 8 | Final |
| (Ontario) Rachel Homan 🔨 | 0 | 0 | 4 | 1 | 0 | 0 | 3 | X | 8 |
| (Manitoba) Jennifer Jones | 0 | 1 | 0 | 0 | 0 | 2 | 0 | X | 3 |

| Team | 1 | 2 | 3 | 4 | 5 | 6 | 7 | 8 | Final |
| (Sweden) Cissi Östlund 🔨 | 2 | 0 | 0 | 1 | 0 | 1 | 0 | 2 | 6 |
| (Saskatchewan) Brett Barber | 0 | 1 | 2 | 0 | 1 | 0 | 1 | 0 | 5 |

=== Draw 12 ===
Sunday, October 11, 8:15 pm

| Team | 1 | 2 | 3 | 4 | 5 | 6 | 7 | 8 | Final |
| (Alberta) Chelsea Carey 🔨 | 0 | 2 | 0 | 1 | 0 | 1 | 2 | X | 6 |
| (Saskatchewan) Stefanie Lawton | 0 | 0 | 1 | 0 | 1 | 0 | 0 | X | 2 |

| Team | 1 | 2 | 3 | 4 | 5 | 6 | 7 | 8 | Final |
| (Alberta) Shannon Kleibrink 🔨 | 2 | 0 | 0 | 1 | 0 | 0 | 1 | 2 | 6 |
| (Manitoba) Michelle Montford | 0 | 1 | 3 | 0 | 0 | 1 | 0 | 0 | 5 |

| Team | 1 | 2 | 3 | 4 | 5 | 6 | 7 | 8 | Final |
| (Alberta) Casey Scheidegger 🔨 | 0 | 1 | 0 | 0 | 0 | 1 | 0 | X | 2 |
| (Ontario) Rachel Homan | 1 | 0 | 1 | 1 | 1 | 0 | 2 | X | 6 |

| Team | 1 | 2 | 3 | 4 | 5 | 6 | 7 | 8 | Final |
| (Sweden) Cissi Östlund 🔨 | 2 | 1 | 0 | 0 | 0 | 0 | 3 | X | 6 |
| (British Columbia) Kelly Scott | 0 | 0 | 1 | 1 | 0 | 1 | 0 | X | 3 |

== Playoffs ==
Quarterfinals
A1 | (Alberta) Val Sweeting | 5
C2 | (Alberta) Shannon Kleibrink | 3
C1 | (Alberta) Chelsea Carey | 4
B2 | (Switzerland) Michèle Jäggi | 3
B1 | (Alberta) Kelsey Rocque | 9
C4 | (Sweden) Cissi Östlund | 2
C3 | (Ontario) Rachel Homan | 6
A2 | (Ontario) Tracy Fleury | 2

Semifinals
A1 | (Alberta) Val Sweeting | 3
C1 | (Alberta) Chelsea Carey | 5
B1 | (Alberta) Kelsey Rocque | 4
C3 | (Ontario) Rachel Homan | 7

Final
C1 | (Alberta) Chelsea Carey | 3
C3 | (Ontario) Rachel Homan | 9

=== Quarterfinals ===
Monday, October 12, 9:00 am

| Team | 1 | 2 | 3 | 4 | 5 | 6 | 7 | 8 | Final |
| (Alberta) Val Sweeting 🔨 | 1 | 0 | 0 | 1 | 0 | 2 | 0 | 1 | 5 |
| (Alberta) Shannon Kleibrink | 0 | 1 | 0 | 0 | 1 | 0 | 1 | 0 | 3 |

| Team | 1 | 2 | 3 | 4 | 5 | 6 | 7 | 8 | 9 | Final |
| (Alberta) Chelsea Carey | 0 | 1 | 0 | 1 | 1 | 0 | 0 | 0 | 1 | 4 |
| (Switzerland) Michèle Jäggi 🔨 | 1 | 0 | 1 | 0 | 0 | 0 | 0 | 1 | 0 | 3 |

| Team | 1 | 2 | 3 | 4 | 5 | 6 | 7 | 8 | Final |
| (Alberta) Kelsey Rocque 🔨 | 1 | 0 | 4 | 0 | 3 | 1 | X | X | 9 |
| (Sweden) Cissi Östlund | 0 | 1 | 0 | 1 | 0 | 0 | X | X | 2 |

| Team | 1 | 2 | 3 | 4 | 5 | 6 | 7 | 8 | Final |
| (Ontario) Rachel Homan | 0 | 0 | 3 | 0 | 3 | 0 | 0 | X | 6 |
| (Ontario) Tracy Fleury 🔨 | 0 | 1 | 0 | 0 | 0 | 1 | 0 | X | 2 |

=== Semifinals ===
Monday, October 12, 12:15 pm

| Team | 1 | 2 | 3 | 4 | 5 | 6 | 7 | 8 | Final |
| (Alberta) Val Sweeting 🔨 | 0 | 1 | 0 | 1 | 0 | 0 | 1 | 0 | 3 |
| (Alberta) Chelsea Carey | 2 | 0 | 1 | 0 | 0 | 1 | 0 | 1 | 5 |

| Team | 1 | 2 | 3 | 4 | 5 | 6 | 7 | 8 | Final |
| (Alberta) Kelsey Rocque 🔨 | 0 | 2 | 0 | 0 | 0 | 2 | 0 | 0 | 4 |
| (Ontario) Rachel Homan | 0 | 0 | 0 | 2 | 1 | 0 | 0 | 4 | 7 |

=== Final ===
Monday, October 12, 3:30 pm

| Team | 1 | 2 | 3 | 4 | 5 | 6 | 7 | 8 | Final |
| (Alberta) Chelsea Carey | 0 | 1 | 0 | 2 | 0 | X | X | X | 3 |
| (Ontario) Rachel Homan 🔨 | 2 | 0 | 5 | 0 | 2 | X | X | X | 9 |
