= 2011 World Women's Curling Championship =

Coordinates: 55°28′N 8°27′E

- Host city: Esbjerg, Denmark
- Arena: Granly Hockey Arena
- Dates: March 19–27, 2011
- Winner: Sweden
- Curling club: Karlstads CK, Karlstad, Sweden
- Skip: Anette Norberg
- Third: Cecilia Östlund
- Second: Sara Carlsson
- Lead: Liselotta Lennartsson
- Alternate: Karin Rudström
- Finalist: Canada (Amber Holland)

The 2011 World Women's Curling Championship (branded as Capital One World Women's Curling Championship 2011 for sponsorship reasons) was held in Esbjerg, Denmark at the Granly Hockey Arena from March 19–27, 2011. The Swedish rink skipped by Anette Norberg won the final game over Canada's Amber Holland after a steal of two points in the tenth end.

== Qualification ==
- Denmark (host country)
- Germany (defending champion)
- Canada (highest finisher from the Americas region at the 2010 World Championship)
- United States
- Top six teams from the 2010 European Curling Championships
  - Sweden (winner)
  - Scotland (runner-up)
  - Switzerland (third place)
  - Russia
  - Norway
  - Czech Republic (defeated Latvia in World Challenge)
- Top two teams from the 2010 Pacific Curling Championships
  - South Korea (winner)
  - China (runner-up)

== Teams ==
These are the confirmed teams.

Canada	China	Czech Republic
Kronau CC, Kronau Skip: Amber Holland; Third: Kim Schneider; Second: Tammy Schneider; Lead: Heather Kalenchuk; Alternate: Jolene Campbell	Harbin CC, Harbin Skip: Wang Bingyu; Third: Liu Yin; Second: Yue Qingshuang; Lead: Zhou Yan; Alternate: Yu Xinna	CC Aritma Praha, Prague Skip: Anna Kubešková; Third: Tereza Plíšková; Second: Luisa Illková; Lead: Eliška Jalovcová; Alternate: Veronika Herdová
Denmark	Germany	South Korea
Hvidovre CC, Hvidovre Skip: Lene Nielsen; Third: Helle Simonsen; Second: Jeanne Ellegaard; Lead: Maria Poulsen; Alternate: Mette de Neergaard	SC Riessersee, Garmisch-Partenkirchen Skip: Andrea Schöpp; Third: Imogen Lehmann; Second: Corinna Scholz; Lead: Monika Wagner; Alternate: Stella Heiß	Gyeongjgido CC, Gyeonjgido Skip: Kim Ji-sun; Third: Lee Seul-bee; Second: Shin Mi-sung; Lead: Gim Un-chi; Alternate: Lee Hyun-jung
Norway	Russia	Scotland
Snarøen CC, Snarøen Skip: Linn Githmark; Third: Henriette Løvar; Second: Ingrid Stensrud; Lead: Kristin Moen Skaslien; Alternate: Marianne Rørvik	Moskvitch CC, Moscow Fourth: Anna Sidorova; Skip: Liudmila Privivkova; Second: Margarita Fomina; Lead: Ekaterina Galkina; Alternate: Nkeiruka Ezekh	Lockerbie CC, Lockerbie Skip: Anna Sloan; Third: Claire Hamilton; Second: Vicki Adams; Lead: Rhiann Macleod; Alternate: Eve Muirhead
Sweden	Switzerland	United States
Karlstads CK, Karlstad Skip: Anette Norberg; Third: Cecilia Östlund; Second: Sara Carlsson; Lead: Liselotta Lennartsson; Alternate: Karin Rudström	Davos CC, Davos Skip: Mirjam Ott; Third: Carmen Schäfer; Second: Carmen Küng; Lead: Janine Greiner; Alternate: Nicole Dünki	Niagara Falls CC, Niagara Falls, Ontario, Canada Skip: Patti Lank; Third: Caitlin Maroldo; Second: Jessica Schultz; Lead: Mackenzie Lank; Alternate: Debbie McCormick

== Round-robin standings ==
Final Round-Robin Standings'

Key
Teams to Playoffs
Teams to Tiebreaker

Country	Skip	W	L	PF	PA	Ends Won	Ends Lost	Blank Ends	Stolen Ends	Shot Pct.
Sweden	Anette Norberg	9	2	67	53	40	41	12	8	73%
China	Wang Bingyu	8	3	64	43	44	30	14	16	82%
Denmark	Lene Nielsen	7	4	77	55	47	33	15	14	78%
Canada	Amber Holland	7	4	68	55	42	40	12	7	82%
Switzerland	Mirjam Ott	7	4	68	58	46	37	15	15	82%
Russia	Anna Sidorova	6	5	70	65	40	45	8	8	72%
United States	Patti Lank	6	5	64	63	48	36	10	17	72%
Germany	Andrea Schöpp	5	6	61	67	40	49	12	13	78%
Scotland	Anna Sloan	4	7	49	69	33	43	15	6	76%
Norway	Linn Githmark	3	8	54	71	42	48	15	7	77%
Czech Republic	Anna Kubešková	2	9	40	73	35	43	11	7	71%
South Korea	Kim Ji-Sun	2	9	54	69	39	40	7	10	76%

== Round-robin results ==
All times listed in Central European Time (UTC+1).

=== Draw 1 ===
Friday, March 18, 7:30pm

Sheet B	1	2	3	4	5	6	7	8	9	10	Final
Denmark (Nielsen)	0	1	0	0	0	1	1	0	0	0	3
Germany (Schöpp)	1	0	0	1	0	0	0	2	0	4	8

Sheet C	1	2	3	4	5	6	7	8	9	10	Final
Norway (Githmark)	1	0	2	0	1	0	1	0	1	2	8
Sweden (Norberg)	0	3	0	1	0	2	0	1	0	0	7

=== Draw 2 ===
Saturday, March 19, 9:00am

Sheet A	1	2	3	4	5	6	7	8	9	10	Final
China (Wang)	1	0	0	0	2	0	2	0	1	0	6
Canada (Holland)	0	0	0	2	0	4	0	1	0	1	8

Sheet B	1	2	3	4	5	6	7	8	9	10	Final
United States (Lank)	0	0	0	1	1	0	0	1	0	0	3
Switzerland (Ott)	0	1	1	0	0	0	1	0	0	2	5

Sheet C	1	2	3	4	5	6	7	8	9	10	Final
Scotland (Sloan)	0	0	1	0	0	0	0	0	3	1	5
Czech Republic (Kubešková)	1	1	0	0	1	0	1	2	0	0	6

Sheet D	1	2	3	4	5	6	7	8	9	10	Final
Russia (Privivkova)	0	0	3	3	0	2	0	1	0	X	9
South Korea (Kim)	0	1	0	0	2	0	1	0	1	X	5

=== Draw 3 ===
Saturday, March 19, 2:00pm

Sheet A	1	2	3	4	5	6	7	8	9	10	Final
South Korea (Kim)	1	0	0	0	0	0	1	0	0	X	2
Norway (Githmark)	0	0	0	1	0	1	0	2	1	X	5

Sheet B	1	2	3	4	5	6	7	8	9	10	Final
Sweden (Norberg)	1	0	1	0	1	0	2	0	3	X	8
Russia (Privivkova)	0	1	0	1	0	1	0	1	0	X	4

Sheet C	1	2	3	4	5	6	7	8	9	10	Final
Denmark (Nielsen)	0	0	1	0	1	0	3	1	0	0	6
United States (Lank)	0	1	0	2	0	1	0	0	1	2	7

Sheet D	1	2	3	4	5	6	7	8	9	10	Final
Germany (Schöpp)	2	1	0	1	0	2	0	0	4	X	10
Switzerland (Ott)	0	0	2	0	1	0	3	1	0	X	7

=== Draw 4 ===
Sunday, March 20, 2:00pm

Sheet A	1	2	3	4	5	6	7	8	9	10	Final
Switzerland (Ott)	0	3	0	1	0	2	1	1	1	X	9
Czech Republic (Kubešková)	2	0	0	0	1	0	0	0	0	X	3

Sheet B	1	2	3	4	5	6	7	8	9	10	Final
South Korea (Kim)	0	0	2	0	0	0	1	0	0	X	3
China (Wang)	0	2	0	3	1	1	0	1	2	X	10

Sheet C	1	2	3	4	5	6	7	8	9	10	Final
Canada (Holland)	0	0	1	0	1	0	1	1	0	X	4
Russia (Privivkova)	0	2	0	3	0	2	0	0	2	X	9

Sheet D	1	2	3	4	5	6	7	8	9	10	Final
Scotland (Sloan)	0	3	0	0	0	2	0	0	1	1	7
United States (Lank)	3	0	0	0	1	0	1	1	0	0	6

=== Draw 5 ===
Sunday, March 20, 7:00pm

Sheet A	1	2	3	4	5	6	7	8	9	10	Final
Scotland (Sloan)	1	0	0	0	0	1	0	1	0	0	3
Sweden (Norberg)	0	2	0	0	0	0	0	0	2	1	5

Sheet B	1	2	3	4	5	6	7	8	9	10	11	Final
Czech Republic (Kubešková)	1	2	0	2	0	0	0	0	0	0	2	7
Norway (Githmark)	0	0	1	0	1	1	1	0	0	1	0	5

Sheet C	1	2	3	4	5	6	7	8	9	10	Final
Germany (Schöpp)	1	0	0	0	0	1	0	0	X	X	2
China (Wang)	0	2	1	1	2	0	1	1	X	X	8

Sheet D	1	2	3	4	5	6	7	8	9	10	Final
Denmark (Nielsen)	0	0	1	0	1	2	2	0	1	1	8
Canada (Holland)	0	2	0	1	0	0	0	2	0	0	5

=== Draw 6 ===
Monday, March 21, 9:00am

Sheet A	1	2	3	4	5	6	7	8	9	10	Final
United States (Lank)	0	0	0	2	0	2	0	X	X	X	4
Russia (Privivkova)	3	0	2	0	2	0	4	X	X	X	11

Sheet B	1	2	3	4	5	6	7	8	9	10	Final
Canada (Holland)	0	0	1	0	1	0	0	1	0	X	3
Scotland (Sloan)	0	1	0	2	0	0	3	0	1	X	7

Sheet C	1	2	3	4	5	6	7	8	9	10	Final
South Korea (Kim)	0	0	2	0	0	1	1	0	2	X	6
Switzerland (Ott)	4	1	0	2	0	0	0	1	0	X	8

Sheet D	1	2	3	4	5	6	7	8	9	10	Final
Czech Republic (Kubešková)	1	0	0	1	0	1	0	0	X	X	3
China (Wang)	0	2	3	0	1	0	2	1	X	X	9

=== Draw 7 ===
Monday, March 21, 2:00pm

Sheet A	1	2	3	4	5	6	7	8	9	10	Final
Germany (Schöpp)	0	0	2	0	0	0	1	0	0	X	3
Scotland (Sloan)	1	1	0	2	0	1	0	2	2	X	9

Sheet B	1	2	3	4	5	6	7	8	9	10	Final
China (Wang)	0	0	2	0	1	0	1	0	1	0	5
Sweden (Norberg)	0	1	0	1	0	3	0	1	0	1	7

Sheet C	1	2	3	4	5	6	7	8	9	10	Final
Czech Republic (Kubešková)	0	1	0	1	0	0	0	X	X	X	2
Denmark (Nielsen)	1	0	2	0	2	2	2	X	X	X	9

Sheet D	1	2	3	4	5	6	7	8	9	10	Final
Canada (Holland)	1	0	1	0	3	0	0	1	0	1	7
Norway (Githmark)	0	1	0	2	0	1	0	0	2	0	6

=== Draw 8 ===
Monday, March 21, 7:00pm

Sheet A	1	2	3	4	5	6	7	8	9	10	Final
Sweden (Norberg)	2	3	0	0	3	0	2	0	0	X	10
South Korea (Kim)	0	0	2	1	0	1	0	2	1	X	7

Sheet B	1	2	3	4	5	6	7	8	9	10	Final
Switzerland (Ott)	0	1	0	2	0	0	0	0	0	0	3
Denmark (Nielsen)	0	0	2	0	1	0	0	1	0	2	6

Sheet C	1	2	3	4	5	6	7	8	9	10	Final
Norway (Githmark)	0	1	0	1	0	0	2	2	2	1	9
Russia (Privivkova)	3	0	4	0	0	1	0	0	0	0	8

Sheet D	1	2	3	4	5	6	7	8	9	10	Final
United States (Lank)	1	0	2	2	0	1	1	1	1	X	9
Germany (Schöpp)	0	1	0	0	3	0	0	0	0	X	4

=== Draw 9 ===
Tuesday, March 22, 9:00am

Sheet A	1	2	3	4	5	6	7	8	9	10	Final
Canada (Holland)	1	0	0	3	0	0	2	1	0	X	7
Czech Republic (Kubešková)	0	0	1	0	1	1	0	0	1	X	4

Sheet B	1	2	3	4	5	6	7	8	9	10	Final
Norway (Githmark)	1	0	0	1	0	0	1	0	0	X	3
Germany (Schöpp)	0	1	1	0	2	1	0	1	1	X	7

Sheet C	1	2	3	4	5	6	7	8	9	10	Final
Scotland (Sloan)	0	1	0	0	0	1	0	0	0	X	2
China (Wang)	1	0	0	1	1	0	2	1	2	X	8

Sheet D	1	2	3	4	5	6	7	8	9	10	Final
Sweden (Norberg)	0	3	0	1	0	2	2	X	X	X	8
Denmark (Nielsen)	1	0	1	0	1	0	0	X	X	X	3

=== Draw 10 ===
Tuesday, March 22, 2:00pm

Sheet A	1	2	3	4	5	6	7	8	9	10	Final
Norway (Githmark)	0	2	0	0	0	0	0	1	0	X	3
Denmark (Nielsen)	1	0	0	2	0	1	1	0	3	X	8

Sheet B	1	2	3	4	5	6	7	8	9	10	Final
United States (Lank)	3	0	0	1	0	0	2	1	0	1	8
South Korea (Kim)	0	1	1	0	1	1	0	0	2	0	6

Sheet C	1	2	3	4	5	6	7	8	9	10	Final
Germany (Schöpp)	0	0	2	0	0	1	0	1	1	0	5
Sweden (Norberg)	1	1	0	2	0	0	2	0	0	1	7

Sheet D	1	2	3	4	5	6	7	8	9	10	11	Final
Russia (Privivkova)	1	0	0	1	0	1	3	0	0	1	0	7
Switzerland (Ott)	0	0	1	0	2	0	0	1	3	0	2	9

=== Draw 11 ===
Tuesday, March 22, 7:00pm

Sheet A	1	2	3	4	5	6	7	8	9	10	11	Final
China (Wang)	3	0	0	0	0	0	1	0	0	2	0	6
Switzerland (Ott)	0	1	0	1	1	1	0	0	2	0	1	7

Sheet B	1	2	3	4	5	6	7	8	9	10	Final
Scotland (Sloan)	2	0	1	0	2	0	1	0	0	0	6
Russia (Sidorova)	0	1	0	1	0	2	0	2	0	2	8

Sheet C	1	2	3	4	5	6	7	8	9	10	Final
United States (Lank)	0	1	0	0	2	0	2	0	1	0	6
Canada (Holland)	1	0	2	0	0	2	0	2	0	2	9

Sheet D	1	2	3	4	5	6	7	8	9	10	Final
South Korea (Kim)	2	1	0	2	1	2	0	3	X	X	11
Czech Republic (Kubešková)	0	0	1	0	0	0	1	0	X	X	2

=== Draw 12 ===
Wednesday, March 23, 9:00am

Sheet A	1	2	3	4	5	6	7	8	9	10	Final
Russia (Privivkova)	0	2	0	0	2	0	1	0	0	X	5
Germany (Schöpp)	1	0	1	1	0	0	0	0	0	X	3

Sheet B	1	2	3	4	5	6	7	8	9	10	11	Final
Sweden (Norberg)	0	1	0	3	0	1	2	1	0	0	1	9
Switzerland (Ott)	1	0	2	0	2	0	0	0	2	1	0	8

Sheet C	1	2	3	4	5	6	7	8	9	10	Final
Denmark (Nielsen)	1	0	2	0	0	2	0	2	0	X	7
South Korea (Kim)	0	1	0	0	1	0	1	0	1	X	4

Sheet D	1	2	3	4	5	6	7	8	9	10	11	Final
Norway (Githmark)	0	0	0	0	1	0	2	0	1	1	0	5
United States (Lank)	0	1	1	1	0	1	0	1	0	0	1	6

=== Draw 13 ===
Wednesday, March 23, 2:00pm

Sheet A	1	2	3	4	5	6	7	8	9	10	Final
South Korea (Kim)	1	1	0	0	3	1	0	3	X	X	9
Scotland (Sloan)	0	0	0	2	0	0	1	0	X	X	3

Sheet B	1	2	3	4	5	6	7	8	9	10	Final
China (Wang)	2	0	3	0	1	4	0	4	X	X	14
United States (Lank)	0	2	0	2	0	0	1	0	X	X	5

Sheet C	1	2	3	4	5	6	7	8	9	10	Final
Russia (Privivkova)	1	2	3	0	2	0	4	X	X	X	12
Czech Republic (Kubešková)	0	0	0	2	0	1	0	X	X	X	3

Sheet D	1	2	3	4	5	6	7	8	9	10	Final
Switzerland (Ott)	1	1	0	0	1	0	0	1	0	X	4
Canada (Holland)	0	0	1	1	0	2	0	0	3	X	7

=== Draw 14 ===
Wednesday, March 23, 7:00pm

Sheet A	1	2	3	4	5	6	7	8	9	10	Final
Sweden (Norberg)	0	0	0	2	0	1	1	0	0	1	5
Canada (Holland)	0	2	0	0	1	0	0	1	0	0	4

Sheet B	1	2	3	4	5	6	7	8	9	10	Final
Germany (Schöpp)	0	0	2	0	0	1	2	2	0	X	7
Czech Republic (Kubešková)	1	1	0	0	0	0	0	0	1	X	3

Sheet C	1	2	3	4	5	6	7	8	9	10	Final
China (Wang)	0	0	0	1	0	3	0	1	0	1	6
Norway (Githmark)	0	0	0	0	2	0	0	0	2	0	4

Sheet D	1	2	3	4	5	6	7	8	9	10	Final
Denmark (Nielsen)	0	1	4	0	2	3	0	2	X	X	12
Scotland (Sloan)	0	0	0	2	0	0	3	0	X	X	5

=== Draw 15 ===
Thursday, March 24, 9:00am

Sheet A	1	2	3	4	5	6	7	8	9	10	Final
Czech Republic (Kubešková)	0	0	1	0	2	0	1	0	0	X	4
United States (Lank)	1	0	0	2	0	1	0	2	0	X	6

Sheet B	1	2	3	4	5	6	7	8	9	10	Final
South Korea (Kim)	1	0	0	0	1	0	0	X	X	X	2
Canada (Holland)	0	1	4	1	0	1	2	X	X	X	9

Sheet C	1	2	3	4	5	6	7	8	9	10	Final
Switzerland (Ott)	0	1	2	0	2	1	0	2	1	X	9
Scotland (Sloan)	0	0	0	1	0	0	2	0	0	X	3

Sheet D	1	2	3	4	5	6	7	8	9	10	Final
China (Wang)	0	2	0	1	1	1	1	0	0	2	8
Russia (Privivkova)	1	0	2	0	0	0	0	1	1	0	5

=== Draw 16 ===
Thursday, March 24, 2:00pm

Sheet A	1	2	3	4	5	6	7	8	9	10	Final
Denmark (Nielsen)	0	2	0	0	1	0	0	0	2	0	5
China (Wang)	0	0	2	0	0	2	1	1	0	1	7

Sheet B	1	2	3	4	5	6	7	8	9	10	Final
Scotland (Sloan)	0	0	1	2	1	0	1	0	1	X	6
Norway (Githmark)	1	0	0	0	0	1	0	1	0	X	3

Sheet C	1	2	3	4	5	6	7	8	9	10	Final
Canada (Holland)	0	1	0	3	0	0	1	2	0	1	8
Germany (Schöpp)	0	0	2	0	2	1	0	0	1	0	6

Sheet D	1	2	3	4	5	6	7	8	9	10	11	Final
Czech Republic (Kubešková)	0	0	2	1	0	0	0	0	2	1	0	6
Sweden (Norberg)	2	0	0	0	1	1	2	0	0	0	1	7

=== Draw 17 ===
Thursday, March 24, 7:00pm

Sheet A	1	2	3	4	5	6	7	8	9	10	Final
Switzerland (Ott)	1	0	0	3	0	0	1	0	2	X	7
Norway (Githmark)	0	2	0	0	0	1	0	1	0	X	4

Sheet B	1	2	3	4	5	6	7	8	9	10	Final
Russia (Privivkova)	0	0	1	1	0	0	0	1	0	X	3
Denmark (Nielsen)	0	2	0	0	2	2	1	0	3	X	10

Sheet C	1	2	3	4	5	6	7	8	9	10	Final
Sweden (Norberg)	3	0	0	0	0	0	0	0	X	X	3
United States (Lank)	0	1	0	1	1	1	3	1	X	X	8

Sheet D	1	2	3	4	5	6	7	8	9	10	Final
Germany (Schöpp)	1	0	0	2	0	2	0	0	0	1	6
South Korea (Kim)	0	0	1	0	2	0	1	0	1	0	5

== Tiebreaker ==
March 25, 2:00 PM

Sheet C	1	2	3	4	5	6	7	8	9	10	Final
Canada (Holland)	0	2	1	0	2	0	2	0	0	1	8
Switzerland (Ott)	0	0	0	2	0	1	0	3	0	0	6

Player Percentages
Switzerland		Canada	
Janine Greiner	82%	Heather Kalenchuk	88%
Carmen Küng	74%	Tammy Schneider	95%
Carmen Schäfer	78%	Kim Schneider	84%
Mirjam Ott	72%	Amber Holland	85%
Total	77%	Total	88%

== Playoffs ==
Page playoff system
1	Sweden	7
2	China	6
3	Denmark	7
4	Canada	10

Semifinal
2	China	5
4	Canada	8

Gold Medal Game
1	Sweden	7
4	Canada	5

Bronze Medal Game
3	Denmark	9
2	China	10

=== 1 vs. 2 ===
Friday, March 25, 7:00pm

Sheet C	1	2	3	4	5	6	7	8	9	10	Final
Sweden (Norberg)	1	0	0	1	0	0	3	1	0	1	7
China (Wang)	0	0	1	0	1	2	0	0	2	0	6

Player Percentages
Sweden		China	
Liselotta Lennartsson	79%	Zhou Yan	92%
Sara Carlsson	82%	Yue Qingshuang	85%
Cecilia Östlund	92%	Liu Yin	61%
Anette Norberg	82%	Wang Bingyu	76%
Total	84%	Total	79%

=== 3 vs. 4 ===
Saturday, March 26, 10:00am

Sheet B	1	2	3	4	5	6	7	8	9	10	11	Final
Denmark (Nielsen)	1	0	2	0	0	2	0	0	2	0	0	7
Canada (Holland)	0	2	0	1	1	0	0	2	0	1	3	10

Player Percentages
Denmark		Canada	
Maria Poulsen	70%	Heather Kalenchuk	89%
Jeanne Ellegaard	61%	Tammy Schneider	81%
Helle Simonsen	78%	Kim Schneider	80%
Lene Nielsen	76%	Amber Holland	84%
Total	72%	Total	83%

=== Semifinal ===
Saturday, March 26, 3:00pm

Sheet B	1	2	3	4	5	6	7	8	9	10	Final
China (Wang)	2	0	0	0	0	1	0	0	2	0	5
Canada (Holland)	0	0	1	1	2	0	2	0	0	2	8

Player Percentages
China		Canada	
Zhou Yan	82%	Heather Kalenchuk	88%
Yue Qingshuang	66%	Tammy Schneider	62%
Liu Yin	60%	Kim Schneider	70%
Wang Bingyu	74%	Amber Holland	86%
Total	71%	Total	77%

=== Bronze medal game ===
Sunday, March 27, 10:00am

Sheet B	1	2	3	4	5	6	7	8	9	10	11	Final
Denmark (Nielsen)	1	0	2	0	0	1	0	3	0	2	0	9
China (Wang)	0	2	0	3	1	0	1	0	2	0	1	10

Player Percentages
Denmark		China	
Maria Poulsen	86%	Zhou Yan	86%
Jeanne Ellegaard	73%	Yue Qingshuang	83%
Helle Simonsen	84%	Liu Yin	82%
Lene Nielsen	73%	Wang Bingyu	84%
Total	79%	Total	81%

=== Gold medal game ===
Sunday, March 27, 3:00pm

Sheet B	1	2	3	4	5	6	7	8	9	10	Final
Sweden (Norberg)	1	0	1	0	1	0	1	0	1	2	7
Canada (Holland)	0	0	0	3	0	1	0	1	0	0	5

Player Percentages
Sweden		Canada	
Liselotta Lennartsson	72%	Heather Kalenchuk	80%
Sara Carlsson	68%	Tammy Schneider	65%
Cecilia Östlund	69%	Kim Schneider	74%
Anette Norberg	72%	Amber Holland	78%
Total	70%	Total	74%

2011 Capital One World Women's Curling Championship Winner
(Sweden)
Sweden
8th title

== Top 5 player percentages ==
Leads	%	Seconds	%	Thirds	%	Skips	%
(Canada) Heather Kalenchuk	88	(Denmark) Jeanne Ellegaard	84	(China) Liu Yin	83	(China) Wang Bingyu	81
(Russia) Ekaterina Galkina	84	(China) Yue Qingshuang	81	(Canada) Kim Schneider	81	(Canada) Amber Holland	80
(Switzerland) Janine Greiner	84	(Switzerland) Carmen Küng	80	(Switzerland) Carmen Schäfer	80	(Denmark) Lene Nielsen	79
(Germany) Stella Heiß	84	(Canada) Tammy Schneider	79	(Denmark) Helle Simonsen	78	(Switzerland) Mirjam Ott	76
(United States) Mackenzie Lank	82	(Sweden) Sara Carlsson	78	(Sweden) Cecilia Östlund	78	(Sweden) Anette Norberg	75
