= Liselotta Lennartsson =

Swedish curler (born 1987)

Liselotte Lennartsson
- Curler
- Born: 23 September 1987 (age 39); Karlstad, Sweden

Team
- Curling club: Karlstads CK
- Skip: Anette Norberg
- Third: Cecilia Östlund
- Second: Sara Carlsson
- Lead: Liselotte Lennartsson

Curling career
- World Championship: 2 (2010, 2011)
Medal record
Curling
Representing Sweden
World Championships
Gold medal – first place	2011 Esbjerg	Team
World Junior Curling Championships
Silver medal – second place	2008 Östersund	Team

Liselotte "Lotta" Lennartsson (born 23 September 1987 in Karlstad) is a Swedish curler. She was lead for the Swedish team at the 2008 World Junior Curling Championships in Östersund, winning a silver medal. She is lead for the Swedish team at the 2010 Ford World Women's Curling Championship in Swift Current, Canada.
