= 2008 World Junior Curling Championships =

- Host city: Östersund, Sweden
- Arena: Ishallen
- Dates: March 1–9
- Men's winner: United States
- Skip: Chris Plys
- Third: Aanders Brorson
- Second: Matthew Perushek
- Lead: Matthew Hamilton
- Alternate: Daniel Plys
- Finalist: Sweden (Oskar Eriksson)
- Women's winner: Scotland
- Skip: Eve Muirhead
- Third: Kerry Barr
- Second: Vicki Adams
- Lead: Sarah MacIntyre
- Alternate: Emma Berg
- Finalist: Sweden (Cecilia Östlund)

The 2008 World Junior Curling Championships were held from March 1 to 9 at the Ishallen in Östersund, Sweden.

== Men ==
=== Teams ===
Country	Skip	Third	Second	Lead	Alternate
Canada	William Dion	Jean-Michel Arsenault	Erik Lachance	Miguel Bernard	Alexandre Gauthier-Morissette
China	Zang Jialiang	Wang Zi	Yang Tuo	Chen Lu'an	Ji Yansong
Czech Republic	Krystof Chaloupek	Michal Vojtus	Martin Hejhal	David Jirounek	Jakub Bares
Denmark	Rasmus Stjerne	Mikkel Krause	Oliver Dupont	Troels Harry	Martin Poulsen
Germany	Daniel Neuner	Florian Zahler	Johannes Glaser	Dominik Greindl	George Geiger
Norway	Kristian Rolvsfjord	Steffen Walstad	Steffen R. Mellemseter	Markus Snøve Høiberg	Joacim Suther
Scotland	Glen Muirhead	Scott MacLeod	Scott Andrews	Gordon McDougall	David Read
Sweden	Oskar Eriksson	Henric Jonsson	Marcus Franzén	Nils Karlsson	Markus Eriksson
Switzerland	Manuel Ruch	Claudio Pätz	Daniel Graf	Joel Greiner	Florian Meiskr
United States	Chris Plys	Aanders Brorson	Matthew Perushek	Matthew Hamilton	Daniel Plys

=== Round-robin standings ===
Final round-robin standings

Key
Teams to Playoffs
Teams to Tiebreaker

Country	Skip	W	L
Canada	William Dion	7	2
Sweden	Oskar Eriksson	7	2
United States	Chris Plys	7	2
Switzerland	Manuel Ruch	5	4
Norway	Kristian Rolvsfjord	5	4
Germany	Daniel Neuner	4	5
Denmark	Rasmus Stjerne	4	5
China	Zang Jialiang	3	6
Scotland	Glen Muirhead	2	7
Czech Republic	Krystof Chaloupek	1	8

=== Round-robin results ===
==== Draw 1 ====
Friday, March 2, 12:00

Sheet A	1	2	3	4	5	6	7	8	9	10	Final
Norway (Rolvsfjord) 🔨	0	1	0	1	0	2	0	0	X	X	4
United States (Plys)	0	0	2	0	2	0	3	2	X	X	9

Sheet B	1	2	3	4	5	6	7	8	9	10	11	Final
Germany (Neuner) 🔨	2	0	0	0	0	0	2	0	0	1	0	5
Canada (Dion)	0	1	0	0	2	0	0	1	1	0	1	6

Sheet C	1	2	3	4	5	6	7	8	9	10	Final
Scotland (Muirhead) 🔨	2	1	2	0	2	0	2	X	X	X	9
China (Zang)	0	0	0	1	0	2	0	X	X	X	3

Sheet D	1	2	3	4	5	6	7	8	9	10	Final
Sweden (Eriksson)	0	0	1	3	0	0	0	0	2	X	6
Denmark (Stjerne) 🔨	0	0	0	0	0	1	0	0	0	X	1

Sheet E	1	2	3	4	5	6	7	8	9	10	Final
Czech Republic (Chaloupek)	0	0	0	0	0	2	0	1	0	X	3
Switzerland (Ruch) 🔨	0	0	0	1	1	0	2	0	2	X	6

==== Draw 2 ====
Friday, March 2, 20:00

Sheet A	1	2	3	4	5	6	7	8	9	10	Final
Czech Republic (Chaloupek) 🔨	0	0	0	0	0	0	0	0	X	X	0
Germany (Neuner)	0	2	0	0	1	2	1	1	X	X	7

Sheet B	1	2	3	4	5	6	7	8	9	10	Final
China (Zang)	0	0	0	0	0	1	0	0	X	X	1
Switzerland (Ruch) 🔨	0	2	0	1	0	0	1	1	X	X	5

Sheet C	1	2	3	4	5	6	7	8	9	10	Final
Norway (Rolvsfjord) 🔨	0	0	0	2	0	1	0	4	0	X	7
Sweden (Eriksson)	0	0	0	0	1	0	2	0	1	X	4

Sheet D	1	2	3	4	5	6	7	8	9	10	Final
Scotland (Muirhead) 🔨	1	0	1	0	1	0	3	0	0	X	6
United States (Plys)	0	1	0	4	0	2	0	0	1	X	8

Sheet E	1	2	3	4	5	6	7	8	9	10	Final
Canada (Dion)	0	1	0	0	1	0	X	X	X	X	2
Denmark (Stjerne) 🔨	0	0	3	1	0	4	X	X	X	X	8

==== Draw 3 ====
Saturday, March 3, 14:00

Sheet A	1	2	3	4	5	6	7	8	9	10	Final
Denmark (Stjerne) 🔨	1	0	0	0	2	0	1	0	X	X	4
Switzerland (Ruch)	0	3	0	1	0	3	0	3	X	X	10

Sheet B	1	2	3	4	5	6	7	8	9	10	Final
United States (Plys)	0	2	0	0	2	0	2	0	1	X	7
Sweden (Eriksson) 🔨	2	0	3	0	0	2	0	3	0	X	10

Sheet C	1	2	3	4	5	6	7	8	9	10	Final
Canada (Dion)	0	1	1	0	0	1	0	2	1	X	6
Czech Republic (Chaloupek) 🔨	0	0	0	0	1	0	1	0	0	X	2

Sheet D	1	2	3	4	5	6	7	8	9	10	Final
China (Zang) 🔨	0	0	2	0	0	1	0	1	0	1	5
Norway (Rolvsfjord)	0	0	0	1	0	0	0	0	2	0	3

Sheet E	1	2	3	4	5	6	7	8	9	10	Final
Scotland (Muirhead) 🔨	1	0	1	0	0	0	1	0	X	X	3
Germany (Neuner)	0	2	0	2	0	3	0	3	X	X	10

==== Draw 4 ====
Sunday, March 4, 08:00

Sheet A	1	2	3	4	5	6	7	8	9	10	Final
United States (Plys) 🔨	0	1	0	0	2	0	1	0	0	0	4
Canada (Dion)	0	0	1	1	0	2	0	0	1	2	7

Sheet B	1	2	3	4	5	6	7	8	9	10	Final
Scotland (Muirhead)	1	0	2	0	0	1	1	0	0	X	5
Norway (Rolvsfjord) 🔨	0	3	0	1	2	0	0	1	3	X	10

Sheet C	1	2	3	4	5	6	7	8	9	10	Final
Germany (Neuner)	0	1	0	2	0	0	2	0	2	0	7
Switzerland (Ruch) 🔨	0	0	2	0	1	1	0	2	0	2	8

Sheet D	1	2	3	4	5	6	7	8	9	10	Final
Denmark (Stjerne) 🔨	2	0	1	2	1	1	0	2	X	X	9
Czech Republic (Chaloupek)	0	2	0	0	0	0	1	0	X	X	3

Sheet E	1	2	3	4	5	6	7	8	9	10	Final
Sweden (Eriksson)	0	2	0	4	2	0	X	X	X	X	8
China (Zang) 🔨	1	0	1	0	0	1	X	X	X	X	3

==== Draw 5 ====
Sunday, March 4, 16:00

Sheet A	1	2	3	4	5	6	7	8	9	10	Final
Scotland (Muirhead) 🔨	0	0	2	0	1	0	2	0	1	0	6
Czech Republic (Chaloupek)	3	0	0	1	0	2	0	1	0	1	8

Sheet B	1	2	3	4	5	6	7	8	9	10	11	Final
Canada (Dion) 🔨	0	0	0	0	0	0	0	2	0	0	1	3
China (Zang)	0	0	0	0	0	0	0	0	1	1	0	2

Sheet C	1	2	3	4	5	6	7	8	9	10	Final
United States (Plys)	2	3	0	2	0	2	X	X	X	X	9
Denmark (Stjerne) 🔨	0	0	2	0	0	0	X	X	X	X	2

Sheet D	1	2	3	4	5	6	7	8	9	10	11	Final
Germany (Neuner)	0	0	1	3	0	0	0	0	1	2	0	7
Sweden (Eriksson) 🔨	2	0	0	0	2	1	0	2	0	0	2	9

Sheet E	1	2	3	4	5	6	7	8	9	10	Final
Switzerland (Ruch)	0	1	0	2	0	2	0	1	1	1	8
Norway (Rolvsfjord) 🔨	1	0	1	0	3	0	1	0	0	0	6

==== Draw 6 ====
Monday, March 5, 09:00

Sheet A	1	2	3	4	5	6	7	8	9	10	Final
Switzerland (Ruch)	0	0	1	1	0	0	1	0	1	0	4
Sweden (Eriksson) 🔨	0	1	0	0	0	1	0	2	0	1	5

Sheet B	1	2	3	4	5	6	7	8	9	10	Final
Norway (Rolvsfjord)	0	1	1	0	4	0	1	0	1	X	8
Denmark (Stjerne) 🔨	1	0	0	2	0	1	0	1	0	X	5

Sheet C	1	2	3	4	5	6	7	8	9	10	Final
China (Zang)	1	0	0	0	2	0	1	0	0	2	6
Germany (Neuner) 🔨	0	1	0	0	0	1	0	1	2	0	5

Sheet D	1	2	3	4	5	6	7	8	9	10	Final
Canada (Dion)	0	0	1	0	1	0	1	1	0	2	6
Scotland (Muirhead) 🔨	2	0	0	0	0	1	0	0	0	0	3

Sheet E	1	2	3	4	5	6	7	8	9	10	11	12	Final
United States (Plys)	2	0	0	1	0	0	1	0	0	0	0	2	6
Czech Republic (Chaloupek) 🔨	0	1	0	0	2	0	0	0	0	1	0	0	4

==== Draw 7 ====
Monday, March 5, 19:00

Sheet A	1	2	3	4	5	6	7	8	9	10	Final
Germany (Neuner) 🔨	1	0	0	3	2	1	0	X	X	X	7
Norway (Rolvsfjord)	0	1	0	0	0	0	1	X	X	X	2

Sheet B	1	2	3	4	5	6	7	8	9	10	Final
Switzerland (Ruch)	2	1	0	1	0	0	1	0	0	X	5
United States (Plys) 🔨	0	0	1	0	1	4	0	1	2	X	9

Sheet C	1	2	3	4	5	6	7	8	9	10	11	Final
Sweden (Eriksson) 🔨	0	2	0	2	0	0	1	0	0	2	0	7
Canada (Dion)	0	0	2	0	2	0	0	0	3	0	1	8

Sheet D	1	2	3	4	5	6	7	8	9	10	Final
Czech Republic (Chaloupek)	0	1	0	0	1	0	0	2	X	X	4
China (Zang) 🔨	2	0	2	1	0	0	3	0	X	X	8

Sheet E	1	2	3	4	5	6	7	8	9	10	Final
Denmark (Stjerne)	1	0	0	2	0	2	0	1	0	X	6
Scotland (Muirhead) 🔨	0	1	0	0	0	0	2	0	0	X	3

==== Draw 8 ====
Tuesday, March 6, 14:00

Sheet A	1	2	3	4	5	6	7	8	9	10	Final
China (Zang)	0	0	0	2	0	0	0	X	X	X	2
Denmark (Stjerne) 🔨	1	1	1	0	2	2	1	X	X	X	8

Sheet B	1	2	3	4	5	6	7	8	9	10	Final
Sweden (Eriksson) 🔨	0	2	0	1	3	0	1	X	X	X	7
Czech Republic (Chaloupek)	0	0	0	0	0	1	0	X	X	X	1

Sheet C	1	2	3	4	5	6	7	8	9	10	Final
Switzerland (Ruch)	0	0	0	2	0	0	2	0	0	0	4
Scotland (Muirhead) 🔨	0	0	1	0	3	0	0	1	0	1	6

Sheet D	1	2	3	4	5	6	7	8	9	10	Final
United States (Plys) 🔨	1	0	0	1	2	1	0	1	0	2	8
Germany (Neuner)	0	1	3	0	0	0	2	0	1	0	7

Sheet E	1	2	3	4	5	6	7	8	9	10	Final
Norway (Rolvsfjord)	0	4	0	1	1	0	0	2	0	1	9
Canada (Dion) 🔨	1	0	2	0	0	2	2	0	1	0	8

==== Draw 9 ====
Wednesday, March 7, 09:00

Sheet A	1	2	3	4	5	6	7	8	9	10	Final
Sweden (Eriksson) 🔨	0	0	1	0	2	0	0	4	X	X	7
Scotland (Muirhead)	0	0	0	2	0	0	1	0	X	X	3

Sheet B	1	2	3	4	5	6	7	8	9	10	Final
Denmark (Stjerne)	0	1	0	0	0	0	0	0	1	0	2
Germany (Neuner) 🔨	0	0	0	0	0	3	0	1	0	1	5

Sheet C	1	2	3	4	5	6	7	8	9	10	Final
Czech Republic (Chaloupek)	0	0	0	1	0	1	0	0	X	X	2
Norway (Rolvsfjord) 🔨	0	1	0	0	4	0	2	1	X	X	8

Sheet D	1	2	3	4	5	6	7	8	9	10	Final
Switzerland (Ruch)	0	0	1	0	0	0	X	X	X	X	1
Canada (Dion) 🔨	2	1	0	2	1	1	X	X	X	X	7

Sheet E	1	2	3	4	5	6	7	8	9	10	Final
China (Zang) 🔨	1	0	2	1	0	1	0	1	0	X	6
United States (Plys)	0	2	0	0	4	0	2	0	2	X	10

=== Tiebreaker ===
Wednesday, March 7, 14:00

Sheet B	1	2	3	4	5	6	7	8	9	10	Final
Switzerland (Ruch) 🔨	1	0	2	0	3	0	0	0	0	X	6
Norway (Rolvsfjord)	0	3	0	2	0	3	0	1	0	X	9

=== Playoffs ===
Page playoff system
1	Canada	6
2	Sweden	9
3	United States	7
4	Norway	3

Semifinal
1	Canada	6
3	United States	8

Gold-medal game
2	Sweden	5
3	United States	7

Bronze-medal game
1	Canada	5
4	Norway	3

==== 1 vs. 2 Game ====
Thursday, March 8, 14:00

Sheet D	1	2	3	4	5	6	7	8	9	10	Final
Canada (Dion) 🔨	0	1	0	3	0	1	0	1	0	0	6
Sweden (Eriksson)	0	0	2	0	2	0	1	0	2	2	9

==== 3 vs. 4 Game ====
Thursday, March 8, 14:00

Sheet C	1	2	3	4	5	6	7	8	9	10	Final
United States (Plys) 🔨	2	0	0	1	0	0	2	0	2	X	7
Norway (Rolvsfjord)	0	2	0	0	0	0	0	1	0	X	3

==== Semifinal ====
Thursday, March 8, 19:00

Sheet A	1	2	3	4	5	6	7	8	9	10	Final
Canada (Dion) 🔨	1	0	0	0	2	2	0	1	0	0	6
United States (Plys)	0	2	1	0	0	0	3	0	1	1	8

==== Bronze-medal game ====
Friday, March 9, 14:00

Sheet A	1	2	3	4	5	6	7	8	9	10	Final
Canada (Dion) 🔨	1	1	0	1	0	1	0	1	0	X	5
Norway (Rolvsfjord)	0	0	0	0	1	0	1	0	1	X	3

==== Gold-medal game ====
Friday, March 9, 14:30

Sheet C	1	2	3	4	5	6	7	8	9	10	Final
United States (Plys)	2	0	3	0	0	0	0	2	0	X	7
Sweden (Eriksson) 🔨	0	2	0	0	0	1	1	0	1	X	5

2008 World Junior Men's Curling Championship
(United States)
United States
3rd title

== Women ==
=== Teams ===
Country	Skip	Third	Second	Lead	Alternate
Canada	Kaitlyn Lawes	Jenna Loder	Liz Peters	Sarah Wazney	Mary Jane McKenzie
Denmark	Madeleine Dupont	Jeanne Ellegaard	Mona Sylvest Nielsen	Lisa Sylvest Nielsen	Ivana Bratic
Germany	Frederike Templin	Pia-Lisa Schöll	Ann Kathrin Bastian	Simone Ackermann	Sandra Gollinger
Japan	Satsuki Fujisawa	Shiori Fujisawa	Yui Okabe	Madoka Shinoo	Yukina Furuse
Norway	Anneline Skårsmoen	Kjersti Husby	Rita Nerlien	Hanne Munkvold	Rita Nerlien
Russia	Ludmila Privivkova	Margarita Fomina	Daria Kozlova	Ekaterina Galkina	Daria Kozlova
Scotland	Eve Muirhead	Kerry Barr	Vicki Adams	Sarah MacIntyre	Kay Adams
Sweden	Cecilia Östlund	Sara Carlsson	Anna Domeij	Liselotta Lennartsson	Emma Berg
Switzerland	Michèle Jäggi	Marisa Winkelhausen	Nicole Schwägli	Isabel Kurt	Gioia Oechsle
United States	Nina Spatola	Rebecca Hamilton	Anna Plys	Jenna Haag	Karlie Koenig

=== Round-robin standings ===
Final round-robin standings

Key
Teams to Playoffs
Teams to Tiebreaker

Country	Skip	W	L
Sweden	Cecilia Östlund	7	2
Scotland	Eve Muirhead	7	2
Russia	Ludmila Privivkova	6	3
Canada	Kaitlyn Lawes	5	4
Denmark	Madeleine Dupont	5	4
Switzerland	Michèle Jäggi	4	5
Japan	Satsuki Fujisawa	3	6
United States	Nina Spatola	3	6
Norway	Anneline Skårsmoen	3	6
Germany	Frederike Templin	2	7

=== Round-robin results ===
==== Draw 1 ====
Friday, March 2, 8:00

Sheet A	1	2	3	4	5	6	7	8	9	10	Final
Germany (Templin)	1	0	1	1	2	0	2	0	1	X	8
Russia (Privivkova) 🔨	0	1	0	0	0	2	0	1	0	X	4

Sheet B	1	2	3	4	5	6	7	8	9	10	11	Final
Scotland (Muirhead)	0	1	0	1	0	1	1	0	3	1	0	8
Sweden (Östlund) 🔨	0	0	2	0	3	0	0	3	0	0	1	9

Sheet C	1	2	3	4	5	6	7	8	9	10	Final
Switzerland (Jäggi) 🔨	0	2	0	1	0	1	0	1	1	0	6
Denmark (Dupont)	2	0	1	0	1	0	2	0	0	1	7

Sheet D	1	2	3	4	5	6	7	8	9	10	Final
Canada (Lawes)	0	2	0	2	0	0	1	0	1	0	6
Norway (Skårsmoen)	0	0	2	0	2	0	0	2	0	1	7

Sheet E	1	2	3	4	5	6	7	8	9	10	Final
United States (Spatola)	1	1	0	0	0	0	0	0	X	X	2
Japan (Fujisawa) 🔨	0	0	0	1	2	1	1	2	X	X	7

==== Draw 2 ====
Friday, March 2, 16:00

Sheet A	1	2	3	4	5	6	7	8	9	10	Final
United States (Spatola)	0	1	2	0	0	1	1	0	0	X	5
Scotland (Muirhead) 🔨	4	0	0	2	1	0	0	1	1	X	9

Sheet B	1	2	3	4	5	6	7	8	9	10	Final
Denmark (Dupont)	0	0	1	1	0	0	0	2	0	1	5
Japan (Fujisawa) 🔨	2	0	0	0	1	0	0	0	1	0	4

Sheet C	1	2	3	4	5	6	7	8	9	10	Final
Germany (Templin) 🔨	2	0	0	1	0	0	1	1	0	0	5
Canada (Lawes)	0	2	2	0	1	0	0	0	2	1	8

Sheet D	1	2	3	4	5	6	7	8	9	10	Final
Switzerland (Jäggi)	0	1	0	1	0	1	0	0	0	X	3
Russia (Privivkova) 🔨	1	0	2	0	1	0	1	1	2	X	8

Sheet E	1	2	3	4	5	6	7	8	9	10	Final
Sweden (Östlund)	0	0	1	0	0	1	0	0	2	X	4
Norway (Skårsmoen) 🔨	1	1	0	2	1	0	1	1	0	X	7

==== Draw 3 ====
Saturday, March 3, 9:00

Sheet A	1	2	3	4	5	6	7	8	9	10	Final
Norway (Skårsmoen)	0	1	0	1	0	0	1	0	X	X	3
Japan (Fujisawa) 🔨	1	0	2	0	2	1	0	3	X	X	9

Sheet B	1	2	3	4	5	6	7	8	9	10	Final
Russia (Privivkova)	0	0	0	2	1	1	0	1	2	0	7
Canada (Lawes) 🔨	1	1	2	0	0	0	0	0	0	0	4

Sheet C	1	2	3	4	5	6	7	8	9	10	Final
Sweden (Östlund)	0	0	1	0	0	3	0	2	0	0	6
United States (Spatola) 🔨	0	0	0	1	2	0	1	0	1	0	5

Sheet D	1	2	3	4	5	6	7	8	9	10	Final
Denmark (Dupont) 🔨	2	0	4	2	0	0	0	2	X	X	10
Germany (Templin)	0	1	0	0	1	2	1	0	X	X	5

Sheet E	1	2	3	4	5	6	7	8	9	10	Final
Switzerland (Jäggi)	0	0	1	0	1	0	1	0	X	X	3
Scotland (Muirhead) 🔨	1	0	0	2	0	6	0	2	X	X	11

==== Draw 4 ====
Saturday, March 3, 19:00

Sheet A	1	2	3	4	5	6	7	8	9	10	Final
Russia (Privivkova)	0	0	0	0	1	0	0	2	1	0	4
Sweden (Östlund) 🔨	0	0	2	1	0	0	2	0	0	1	6

Sheet B	1	2	3	4	5	6	7	8	9	10	Final
Switzerland (Jäggi)	0	0	0	1	0	1	2	0	3	X	7
Germany (Templin) 🔨	0	0	0	0	1	0	0	2	0	X	3

Sheet C	1	2	3	4	5	6	7	8	9	10	Final
Scotland (Muirhead) 🔨	1	0	2	2	0	1	1	0	1	X	8
Japan (Fujisawa)	0	1	0	0	2	0	0	1	0	X	4

Sheet D	1	2	3	4	5	6	7	8	9	10	Final
Norway (Skårsmoen) 🔨	1	0	2	0	1	0	0	0	2	0	6
United States (Spatola)	0	0	0	2	0	0	2	2	0	1	7

Sheet E	1	2	3	4	5	6	7	8	9	10	Final
Canada (Lawes)	0	2	0	1	0	3	0	0	0	2	8
Denmark (Dupont) 🔨	3	0	2	0	1	0	0	1	0	0	7

==== Draw 5 ====
Sunday, March 4, 12:00

Sheet A	1	2	3	4	5	6	7	8	9	10	Final
Switzerland (Jäggi) 🔨	2	0	1	1	0	1	0	0	0	1	6
United States (Spatola)	0	2	0	0	0	0	1	1	1	0	5

Sheet B	1	2	3	4	5	6	7	8	9	10	Final
Sweden (Östlund) 🔨	2	0	1	3	0	2	X	X	X	X	8
Denmark (Dupont)	0	0	0	0	1	0	X	X	X	X	1

Sheet C	1	2	3	4	5	6	7	8	9	10	Final
Russia (Privivkova) 🔨	1	0	1	1	0	2	0	2	1	X	8
Norway (Skårsmoen)	0	1	0	0	2	0	0	0	0	X	3

Sheet D	1	2	3	4	5	6	7	8	9	10	Final
Scotland (Muirhead) 🔨	2	0	0	0	0	1	1	0	3	X	7
Canada (Lawes)	0	1	1	0	1	0	0	1	0	X	4

Sheet E	1	2	3	4	5	6	7	8	9	10	Final
Japan (Fujisawa) 🔨	1	1	0	0	1	1	0	2	0	1	7
Germany (Templin)	0	0	0	2	0	0	1	0	2	0	5

==== Draw 6 ====
Sunday, March 4, 20:00

Sheet A	1	2	3	4	5	6	7	8	9	10	Final
Japan (Fujisawa) 🔨	1	0	0	0	1	0	1	1	0	X	4
Canada (Lawes)	0	0	0	2	0	3	0	0	2	X	7

Sheet B	1	2	3	4	5	6	7	8	9	10	Final
Germany (Templin)	0	0	1	0	3	0	2	4	0	X	10
Norway (Skårsmoen) 🔨	1	0	0	1	0	3	0	0	1	X	6

Sheet C	1	2	3	4	5	6	7	8	9	10	11	Final
Denmark (Dupont) 🔨	2	0	1	1	0	1	0	0	0	0	1	6
Scotland (Muirhead)	0	1	0	0	2	0	1	0	1	0	0	5

Sheet D	1	2	3	4	5	6	7	8	9	10	Final
Sweden (Östlund)	0	0	0	2	0	0	0	1	X	X	3
Switzerland (Jäggi) 🔨	2	1	1	0	1	1	2	0	X	X	8

Sheet E	1	2	3	4	5	6	7	8	9	10	Final
Russia (Privivkova)	0	2	0	2	0	2	0	0	3	1	10
United States (Spatola) 🔨	2	0	1	0	2	0	2	2	0	0	9

==== Draw 7 ====
Monday, March 5, 14:00

Team	Final
Scotland (Muirhead) 🔨	5
Germany (Templin)	4

Team	Final
Japan (Fujisawa)	7
Russia (Privivkova) 🔨	8

Team	Final
Canada (Lawes) 🔨	6
Sweden (Östlund)	7

Team	Final
United States (Spatola) 🔨	9
Denmark (Dupont)	2

Team	Final
Norway (Skårsmoen) 🔨	7
Switzerland (Jäggi)	5

==== Draw 8 ====
Tuesday, March 6, 9:00

Sheet A	1	2	3	4	5	6	7	8	9	10	Final
Denmark (Dupont) 🔨	0	0	0	2	0	1	0	X	X	X	9
Norway (Skårsmoen)	2	1	2	0	2	0	2	X	X	X	3

Sheet B	1	2	3	4	5	6	7	8	9	10	Final
Canada (Lawes) 🔨	4	1	0	1	3	0	X	X	X	X	9
United States (Spatola)	0	0	2	0	0	0	X	X	X	X	2

Sheet C	1	2	3	4	5	6	7	8	9	10	Final
Japan (Fujisawa)	0	1	0	1	0	1	0	0	2	1	6
Switzerland (Jäggi) 🔨	1	0	2	0	1	0	1	1	0	0	7

Sheet D	1	2	3	4	5	6	7	8	9	10	Final
Russia (Privivkova)	0	1	0	0	0	0	0	0	X	X	1
Scotland (Muirhead) 🔨	0	1	0	1	1	2	2	1	X	X	8

Sheet E	1	2	3	4	5	6	7	8	9	10	Final
Germany (Templin)	0	0	0	2	0	1	0	1	0	X	4
Sweden (Östlund) 🔨	0	0	0	0	3	0	2	0	1	X	6

==== Draw 9 ====
Tuesday, March 6, 19:00

Sheet A	1	2	3	4	5	6	7	8	9	10	Final
Canada (Lawes)	0	0	1	0	3	0	0	4	0	0	8
Switzerland (Jäggi) 🔨	0	2	0	1	0	0	1	0	1	2	7

Sheet B	1	2	3	4	5	6	7	8	9	10	Final
Norway (Skårsmoen)	1	0	0	1	0	0	1	0	X	X	3
Scotland (Muirhead) 🔨	0	0	2	0	0	5	0	0	X	X	7

Sheet C	1	2	3	4	5	6	7	8	9	10	Final
United States (Spatola) 🔨	0	3	2	0	3	0	X	X	X	X	8
Germany (Templin)	0	0	0	1	0	1	X	X	X	X	2

Sheet D	1	2	3	4	5	6	7	8	9	10	Final
Japan (Fujisawa)	0	0	0	1	0	1	1	0	0	X	3
Sweden (Östlund) 🔨	0	1	1	0	1	0	0	0	3	X	6

Sheet E	1	2	3	4	5	6	7	8	9	10	Final
Denmark (Dupont)	0	0	1	0	0	1	1	1	0	2	6
Russia (Privivkova) 🔨	2	1	0	0	3	0	0	0	1	0	7

=== Tiebreaker ===
Wednesday, March 7, 14:00

Sheet D	1	2	3	4	5	6	7	8	9	10	Final
Canada (Lawes) 🔨	1	0	0	2	0	3	0	0	1	3	10
Denmark (Dupont)	0	2	3	0	1	0	0	1	0	0	7

=== Playoffs ===
Page playoff system
1	Sweden	8
2	Scotland	2
3	Russia	7
4	Canada	5

Semifinal
2	Scotland	7
3	Russia	6

Gold-medal game
1	Sweden	3
2	Scotland	12

Bronze-medal game
3	Russia	8
4	Canada	9

==== 1 vs. 2 Game ====
Thursday, March 8, 14:00

Sheet A	1	2	3	4	5	6	7	8	9	10	Final
Sweden (Östlund) 🔨	0	1	0	2	0	1	1	3	X	X	8
Scotland (Muirhead)	0	0	1	0	1	0	0	0	X	X	2

==== 3 vs. 4 Game ====
Thursday, March 8, 14:00

Sheet B	1	2	3	4	5	6	7	8	9	10	Final
Canada (Lawes)	0	0	3	0	0	1	0	0	1	X	5
Russia (Privivkova) 🔨	1	0	0	2	1	0	2	1	0	X	7

==== Semifinal ====
Thursday, March 8, 19:00

Sheet D	1	2	3	4	5	6	7	8	9	10	Final
Scotland (Muirhead) 🔨	1	0	1	0	1	1	0	3	0	0	7
Russia (Privivkova)	0	2	0	0	0	0	1	0	1	2	6

==== Bronze-medal game ====
Friday, March 9, 9:00

Sheet A	1	2	3	4	5	6	7	8	9	10	Final
Canada (Lawes)	0	0	0	1	3	0	0	3	0	2	9
Russia (Privivkova) 🔨	0	2	3	0	0	1	1	0	1	0	8

==== Gold-medal game ====
Friday, March 9, 9:30

Sheet C	1	2	3	4	5	6	7	8	9	10	Final
Sweden (Östlund) 🔨	1	0	0	1	0	0	0	1	X	X	3
Scotland (Muirhead)	0	2	2	0	1	6	1	0	X	X	12

2008 World Junior Women's Curling Championship
(Scotland)
Scotland
6th title

== Qualifying events ==
=== European Junior Curling Challenge ===
The European Qualification takes place via a challenge tournament this year in Prague, Czech Republic. 8 women's teams and 12 men's teams will compete for 1 spot to the WJCC.

==== Men's Rankings ====
Rank(MA)	Team	W	L
1	Czech Republic	4	0
2	France	3	1
3	Spain	2	2
4	Belgium	1	3
5	Finland	1	3
6	Latvia	1	3

Rank(MB)	Team	W	L
1	Italy	3	1
2	Poland	3	1
3	Netherlands	2	2
4	Estonia	2	2
5	Russia	2	2
6	Slovakia	0	4

=== Pacific Junior Curling Championships ===
Played between 16 and 20 Jan-2008 in Jeonju, Korea. The format saw a double round-robin with the top 3 making the medal round. First got a bye to the Final and 2nd and 3rd played in a single semi-final.

==== Men's Rankings ====
Rank(RR)	Team	W	L
1	China	5	1
2	Japan	3	3
3	South Korea	3	3
4	New Zealand	1	5
