= 2010 World Women's Curling Championship =

World Women's Curling Championship

Coordinates: 50°17′N 107°56′W

- Host city: Swift Current, Saskatchewan
- Arena: Credit Union iPlex
- Dates: March 20–28, 2010
- Winner: Germany
- Curling club: SC Riessersee, Garmisch-Partenkirchen
- Skip: Andrea Schöpp
- Third: Melanie Robillard
- Second: Monika Wagner
- Lead: Stella Heiß
- Alternate: Corinna Scholz
- Coach: Rainer Schöpp
- Finalist: Scotland (Eve Muirhead)

The 2010 World Women's Curling Championship (branded as 2010 Ford World Women's Curling Championship for sponsorship reasons) was held from March 20 to 28 at the Credit Union iPlex in Swift Current, Saskatchewan, Canada.

== Qualification ==
- Canada (host country)
- China (defending champion)
- Japan (Pacific runner-up)
- United States (Americas region)
- Eight teams from the 2009 European Curling Championships:
  - Germany
  - Switzerland
  - Denmark
  - Russia
  - Sweden
  - Scotland
  - Norway
  - Latvia (defeated Finland in best-of-three World Challenge series)

== Teams ==
The teams were as listed below:

Canada	China	Denmark
St. Vital CC, Winnipeg Skip: Jennifer Jones; Third: Cathy Overton-Clapham; Second: Jill Officer; Lead: Dawn Askin; Alternate: Jennifer Clark-Rouire	Harbin CC, Harbin Skip: Wang Bingyu; Third: Liu Yin; Second: Yue Qingshuang; Lead: Zhou Yan; Alternate: Zhang Xindi	Tårnby CC, Tårnby Fourth: Madeleine Dupont; Third: Denise Dupont; Skip: Angelina Jensen; Lead: Camilla Jensen; Alternate: Ivana Bratic
Germany	Japan	Latvia
SC Riessersee, Garmisch-Partenkirchen Skip: Andrea Schöpp; Third: Melanie Robillard; Second: Monika Wagner; Lead: Stella Heiß*; Alternate: Corinna Scholz*	Aomori CC, Aomori Skip: Moe Meguro; Third: Anna Ohmiya; Second: Mari Motohashi; Lead: Kotomi Ishizaki; Alternate: Mayo Yamaura	Jelgava CC, Jelgava Skip: Iveta Staša-Šaršūne; Third: Una Grava-Germane; Second: Ieva Krusta; Lead: Zanda Bikše; Alternate: Dace Munča
Norway	Russia	Scotland
Stabekk CC, Stabekk Skip: Linn Githmark; Third: Henriette Løvar; Second: Ingrid Stensrud; Lead: Kristin Skaslien; Alternate: Kristin Tøsse Løvseth	Moskvitch CC, Moscow Skip: Ludmila Privivkova**; Third: Anna Sidorova; Second: Nkeiruka Ezekh; Lead: Ekaterina Galkina; Alternate: Margarita Fomina	Dunkeld CC, Dunkeld Skip: Eve Muirhead; Third: Kelly Wood; Second: Lorna Vevers; Lead: Anne Laird; Alternate: Sarah Reid
Sweden	Switzerland	United States
Karlstad CC, Karlstad Skip: Cecilia Östlund; Third: Sara Carlsson; Second: Anna Domeij; Lead: Liselotta Lennartsson; Alternate: Sabina Kraupp	Flims PurePower CC, Flims Skip: Binia Feltscher; Third: Corinne Bourquin; Second: Heike Schwaller; Lead: Sandra Ramstein-Attinger; Alternate: Marisa Winkelhausen	Madison CC, Madison Skip: Erika Brown; Third: Nina Spatola; Second: Ann Swisshelm; Lead: Laura Hallisey; Alternate: Jessica Schultz

* Stella Heiß and Corinna Scholz alternated in the lead position.
** Anna Sidorova replaced Ludmila Privivkova as skip after Draw 2. Privivkova became the alternate, while Margarita Fomina replaced Sidorova in the third position.

== Round robin standings ==
Key
Teams to Playoffs
Teams to Tiebreaker

Country	Skip	W	L	PF	PA	Ends Won	Ends Lost	Blank Ends	Stolen Ends	Shot Pct.
Canada	Jennifer Jones	10	1	92	57	49	31	10	12	87%
Germany	Andrea Schöpp	8	3	78	63	47	41	14	11	81%
Scotland	Eve Muirhead	8	3	90	54	48	37	9	13	82%
Sweden	Cecilia Östlund	7	4	74	71	43	46	7	13	81%
United States	Erika Brown	7	4	81	69	51	41	10	12	78%
Denmark	Angelina Jensen	6	5	84	68	46	44	7	13	81%
China	Wang Bingyu	6	5	78	80	51	45	5	16	81%
Russia	Anna Sidorova	5	6	66	66	47	41	15	13	79%
Norway	Linn Githmark	3	8	63	76	40	51	12	7	77%
Switzerland	Binia Feltscher	3	8	63	76	46	48	11	12	78%
Japan	Moe Meguro	2	9	53	88	40	52	8	9	74%
Latvia*	Iveta Staša-Šaršūne	1	10	37	91	30	51	12	4	71%

*First Appearance

== Round robin results ==
All draw times listed are in Central Standard Time (UTC−6).

=== Draw 1 ===
Saturday, March 20, 14:00

Sheet A	1	2	3	4	5	6	7	8	9	10	Final
China (Wang) 🔨	0	1	0	3	1	0	0	1	0	0	6
Germany (Schöpp)	0	0	3	0	0	1	1	0	2	1	8

Sheet B	1	2	3	4	5	6	7	8	9	10	Final
Russia (Privivkova) 🔨	0	2	0	3	0	0	0	1	0	0	6
United States (Brown)	1	0	2	0	1	2	1	0	0	1	8

Sheet C	1	2	3	4	5	6	7	8	9	10	Final
Japan (Meguro)	0	0	1	2	0	1	0	0	2	1	7
Latvia (Staša-Šaršūne) 🔨	1	0	0	0	2	0	0	1	0	0	4

Sheet D	1	2	3	4	5	6	7	8	9	10	Final
Scotland (Muirhead) 🔨	2	0	3	0	1	0	0	3	X	X	9
Denmark (Jensen)	0	1	0	1	0	2	0	0	X	X	4

=== Draw 2 ===
Saturday, March 20, 19:00

Sheet A	1	2	3	4	5	6	7	8	9	10	Final
Latvia (Staša-Šaršūne)	0	0	0	0	0	1	0	0	1	X	2
Russia (Privivkova) 🔨	0	1	1	0	0	0	0	2	0	X	4

Sheet B	1	2	3	4	5	6	7	8	9	10	Final
Canada (Jones) 🔨	1	0	0	0	2	3	1	0	2	X	9
Sweden (Östlund)	0	2	1	2	0	0	0	1	0	X	6

Sheet C	1	2	3	4	5	6	7	8	9	10	Final
Norway (Githmark)	0	2	0	1	1	0	0	2	0	1	7
Switzerland (Feltscher) 🔨	1	0	1	0	0	0	1	0	3	0	6

Sheet D	1	2	3	4	5	6	7	8	9	10	Final
Japan (Meguro)	0	0	0	0	2	1	0	X	X	X	3
United States (Brown) 🔨	0	1	2	3	0	0	4	X	X	X	10

=== Draw 3 ===
Sunday, March 21 8:30

Sheet B	1	2	3	4	5	6	7	8	9	10	Final
Denmark (Jensen) 🔨	2	0	0	0	1	2	1	2	X	X	8
China (Wang)	0	1	1	1	0	0	0	0	X	X	3

Sheet C	1	2	3	4	5	6	7	8	9	10	Final
Scotland (Muirhead) 🔨	1	0	0	1	0	2	0	2	0	0	6
Germany (Schöpp)	0	2	0	0	2	0	1	0	0	4	9

=== Draw 4 ===
Sunday, March 21, 13:30

Sheet A	1	2	3	4	5	6	7	8	9	10	Final
Sweden (Östlund)	0	0	0	3	3	0	2	1	0	x	9
Norway (Githmark) 🔨	0	2	0	0	0	2	0	0	1	x	5

Sheet B	1	2	3	4	5	6	7	8	9	10	Final
United States (Brown)	0	0	2	1	1	0	1	0	1	0	6
Latvia (Staša-Šaršūne) 🔨	0	1	0	0	0	1	0	3	0	2	7

Sheet C	1	2	3	4	5	6	7	8	9	10	11	Final
Russia (Sidorova)	0	1	0	0	1	0	2	1	0	1	1	7
Japan (Meguro) 🔨	1	0	1	1	0	2	0	0	1	0	0	6

Sheet D	1	2	3	4	5	6	7	8	9	10	Final
Canada (Jones)	0	0	0	3	0	2	0	1	0	X	6
Switzerland (Feltscher) 🔨	0	1	0	0	1	0	1	0	1	X	4

=== Draw 5 ===
Sunday, March 21, 19:00

Sheet A	1	2	3	4	5	6	7	8	9	10	Final
Germany (Schöpp)	0	1	1	0	0	0	1	0	X	X	3
Denmark (Jensen) 🔨	2	0	0	1	1	2	0	4	X	X	10

Sheet B	1	2	3	4	5	6	7	8	9	10	Final
Norway (Githmark)	0	0	0	0	1	0	2	0	X	X	3
Canada (Jones) 🔨	1	1	0	2	0	1	0	3	X	X	8

Sheet C	1	2	3	4	5	6	7	8	9	10	Final
Switzerland (Feltscher)	0	0	0	1	1	1	0	2	1	0	6
Sweden (Östlund) 🔨	0	1	0	0	0	0	2	0	0	4	7

Sheet D	1	2	3	4	5	6	7	8	9	10	Final
China (Wang)	0	1	0	1	1	0	1	0	X	X	4
Scotland (Muirhead) 🔨	2	0	4	0	0	2	0	6	X	X	14

=== Draw 6 ===
Monday, March 22, 8:30

Sheet A	1	2	3	4	5	6	7	8	9	10	Final
Scotland (Muirhead) 🔨	3	0	2	1	1	2	2	X	X	X	11
Japan (Meguro)	0	2	0	0	0	0	0	X	X	X	2

Sheet B	1	2	3	4	5	6	7	8	9	10	Final
Denmark (Jensen)	0	0	0	1	0	3	0	X	X	X	4
Russia (Sidorova) 🔨	3	0	3	0	1	0	3	X	X	X	10

Sheet C	1	2	3	4	5	6	7	8	9	10	Final
China (Wang) 🔨	0	2	0	2	0	2	1	1	X	X	8
Latvia (Staša-Šaršūne)	0	0	1	0	1	0	0	0	X	X	2

Sheet D	1	2	3	4	5	6	7	8	9	10	Final
Germany (Schöpp)	0	1	0	1	0	4	0	0	2	0	8
United States (Brown) 🔨	1	0	4	0	1	0	1	1	0	4	12

=== Draw 7 ===
Monday, March 22, 13:30

Sheet A	1	2	3	4	5	6	7	8	9	10	11	Final
Russia (Sidorova)	0	0	0	0	2	1	0	0	2	1	0	6
Switzerland (Feltscher) 🔨	0	0	0	2	0	0	2	2	0	0	1	7

Sheet B	1	2	3	4	5	6	7	8	9	10	Final
Japan (Meguro) 🔨	2	0	1	0	0	1	0	1	0	X	5
Sweden (Östlund)	0	1	0	2	2	0	1	0	2	X	8

Sheet C	1	2	3	4	5	6	7	8	9	10	Final
United States (Brown)	0	0	2	0	1	2	0	2	0	1	8
Norway (Githmark) 🔨	2	0	0	1	0	0	1	0	3	0	7

Sheet D	1	2	3	4	5	6	7	8	9	10	Final
Latvia (Staša-Šaršūne)	0	1	0	1	0	1	0	3	0	X	6
Canada (Jones) 🔨	3	0	2	0	3	0	1	0	3	X	12

=== Draw 8 ===
Monday, March 22, 19:30

Sheet A	1	2	3	4	5	6	7	8	9	10	Final
Canada (Jones)	0	2	0	0	0	4	0	2	0	2	10
China (Wang) 🔨	1	0	2	1	1	0	1	0	3	0	9

Sheet B	1	2	3	4	5	6	7	8	9	10	Final
Norway (Githmark)	0	2	0	0	2	0	0	0	X	X	4
Germany (Schöpp) 🔨	1	0	2	3	0	1	1	2	X	X	10

Sheet C	1	2	3	4	5	6	7	8	9	10	Final
Sweden (Östlund)	0	0	0	1	0	1	0	1	X	X	3
Scotland (Muirhead) 🔨	0	0	2	0	3	0	2	0	X	X	7

Sheet D	1	2	3	4	5	6	7	8	9	10	Final
Switzerland (Feltscher)	0	0	0	1	0	2	0	0	X	X	3
Denmark (Jensen) 🔨	1	1	1	0	3	0	1	1	X	X	8

=== Draw 9 ===
Tuesday, March 23, 8:30

Sheet A	1	2	3	4	5	6	7	8	9	10	Final
Sweden (Östlund)	0	0	0	0	1	0	1	0	X	X	2
Germany (Schöpp) 🔨	1	0	2	1	0	2	0	3	X	X	9

Sheet B	1	2	3	4	5	6	7	8	9	10	Final
Switzerland (Feltscher)	0	0	0	1	0	1	1	0	2	0	5
China (Wang) 🔨	1	0	1	0	2	0	0	1	0	1	6

Sheet C	1	2	3	4	5	6	7	8	9	10	Final
Canada (Jones) 🔨	2	0	1	0	1	0	2	0	2	1	9
Denmark (Jensen)	0	0	0	1	0	3	0	2	0	0	6

Sheet D	1	2	3	4	5	6	7	8	9	10	Final
Norway (Githmark)	0	0	0	0	0	2	0	1	0	X	3
Scotland (Muirhead) 🔨	0	2	1	1	1	0	1	0	1	X	7

=== Draw 10 ===
Tuesday, March 23, 13:30

Sheet A	1	2	3	4	5	6	7	8	9	10	Final
Denmark (Jensen)	0	0	3	0	0	1	0	0	1	0	5
United States (Brown) 🔨	1	0	0	1	1	0	0	1	0	2	6

Sheet B	1	2	3	4	5	6	7	8	9	10	Final
Scotland (Muirhead) 🔨	0	2	1	1	4	2	X	X	X	X	10
Latvia (Staša-Šaršūne)	1	0	0	0	0	0	X	X	X	X	1

Sheet C	1	2	3	4	5	6	7	8	9	10	Final
Germany (Schöpp)	0	1	0	0	2	0	1	0	0	0	4
Russia (Sidorova) 🔨	1	0	0	2	0	1	0	1	1	1	7

Sheet D	1	2	3	4	5	6	7	8	9	10	Final
China (Wang)	0	2	0	0	1	3	2	0	3	X	11
Japan (Meguro) 🔨	1	0	2	1	0	0	0	2	0	X	6

=== Draw 11 ===
Tuesday, March 23, 19:30

Sheet A	1	2	3	4	5	6	7	8	9	10	Final
Latvia (Staša-Šaršūne)	0	0	0	1	0	1	0	0	X	X	2
Norway (Githmark) 🔨	2	1	1	0	2	0	1	4	X	X	11

Sheet B	1	2	3	4	5	6	7	8	9	10	Final
United States (Brown) 🔨	0	1	0	2	1	0	0	0	0	X	4
Canada (Jones)	1	0	2	0	0	2	0	0	1	X	6

Sheet C	1	2	3	4	5	6	7	8	9	10	Final
Japan (Meguro)	0	2	1	0	1	0	0	0	0	0	4
Switzerland (Feltscher) 🔨	1	0	0	1	0	0	1	2	1	1	7

Sheet D	1	2	3	4	5	6	7	8	9	10	Final
Russia (Sidorova)	0	0	0	1	1	0	1	X	X	X	3
Sweden (Östlund) 🔨	2	3	1	0	0	4	0	X	X	X	10

=== Draw 12 ===
Wednesday, March 24, 8:30

Sheet A	1	2	3	4	5	6	7	8	9	10	Final
Japan (Meguro)	0	1	0	0	1	0	0	X	X	X	2
Canada (Jones) 🔨	2	0	3	1	0	1	3	X	X	X	10

Sheet B	1	2	3	4	5	6	7	8	9	10	Final
Russia (Sidorova) 🔨	0	0	1	0	0	1	1	0	0	0	3
Norway (Githmark)	0	0	0	1	2	0	0	0	0	1	4

Sheet C	1	2	3	4	5	6	7	8	9	10	Final
Latvia (Staša-Šaršūne) 🔨	0	0	1	0	0	1	1	1	0	X	4
Sweden (Östlund)	0	2	0	2	2	0	0	0	1	X	7

Sheet D	1	2	3	4	5	6	7	8	9	10	Final
United States (Brown)	0	0	2	0	2	0	2	0	3	X	9
Switzerland (Feltscher) 🔨	2	1	0	1	0	1	0	2	0	X	7

=== Draw 13 ===
Wednesday, March 24, 13:30

Sheet A	1	2	3	4	5	6	7	8	9	10	Final
Switzerland (Feltscher)	0	1	1	0	3	0	1	0	1	0	7
Scotland (Muirhead) 🔨	1	0	0	2	0	2	0	2	0	2	9

Sheet B	1	2	3	4	5	6	7	8	9	10	11	Final
Sweden (Östlund)	3	0	3	1	0	1	1	0	0	0	1	10
Denmark (Jensen) 🔨	0	2	0	0	3	0	0	2	1	1	0	9

Sheet C	1	2	3	4	5	6	7	8	9	10	Final
Norway (Githmark)	0	0	1	0	4	1	0	1	0	0	7
China (Wang) 🔨	2	1	0	1	0	0	2	0	1	1	8

Sheet D	1	2	3	4	5	6	7	8	9	10	11	Final
Canada (Jones)	0	0	3	0	2	0	0	1	0	1	0	7
Germany (Schöpp) 🔨	1	0	0	3	0	0	1	0	2	0	1	8

=== Draw 14 ===
Wednesday, March 24, 19:30

Sheet A	1	2	3	4	5	6	7	8	9	10	11	Final
China (Wang)	0	0	3	0	0	1	0	2	0	1	2	9
Russia (Sidorova) 🔨	0	1	0	2	1	0	1	0	2	0	0	7

Sheet B	1	2	3	4	5	6	7	8	9	10	Final
Germany (Schöpp) 🔨	0	3	0	2	0	1	0	1	0	X	7
Japan (Meguro)	0	0	2	0	1	0	1	0	1	X	5

Sheet C	1	2	3	4	5	6	7	8	9	10	Final
Scotland (Muirhead)	0	0	3	0	1	1	0	2	0	X	7
United States (Brown) 🔨	0	1	0	1	0	0	1	0	1	X	4

Sheet D	1	2	3	4	5	6	7	8	9	10	Final
Denmark (Jensen) 🔨	4	3	2	0	2	2	X	X	X	X	13
Latvia (Staša-Šaršūne)	0	0	0	1	0	0	X	X	X	X	1

=== Draw 15 ===
Thursday, March 25, 8:30

Sheet A	1	2	3	4	5	6	7	8	9	10	Final
United States (Brown)	0	1	0	0	2	0	1	0	1	0	5
Sweden (Östlund) 🔨	1	0	3	1	0	1	0	2	0	1	9

Sheet B	1	2	3	4	5	6	7	8	9	10	Final
Latvia (Staša-Šaršūne) 🔨	2	0	1	0	0	1	1	0	1	0	6
Switzerland (Fletscher)	0	2	0	1	2	0	0	2	0	2	9

Sheet C	1	2	3	4	5	6	7	8	9	10	Final
Russia (Sidorova) 🔨	1	0	0	1	0	0	1	0	1	X	4
Canada (Jones)	0	1	1	0	2	0	0	3	0	X	7

Sheet D	1	2	3	4	5	6	7	8	9	10	11	Final
Japan (Meguro)	0	1	0	2	0	0	1	0	1	0	1	6
Norway (Githmark) 🔨	0	0	1	0	0	1	0	1	0	2	0	5

=== Draw 16 ===
Thursday, March 25, 13:30

Sheet A	1	2	3	4	5	6	7	8	9	10	Final
Germany (Schöpp) 🔨	0	1	0	0	1	0	0	0	0	2	4
Latvia (Staša-Šaršūne)	0	0	0	1	0	0	0	1	0	0	2

Sheet B	1	2	3	4	5	6	7	8	9	10	Final
China (Wang)	0	0	2	0	1	0	0	2	0	X	5
United States (Brown) 🔨	1	3	0	2	0	0	1	0	2	X	9

Sheet C	1	2	3	4	5	6	7	8	9	10	Final
Denmark (Jensen) 🔨	1	0	0	0	1	0	0	4	0	2	8
Japan (Meguro)	0	0	3	1	0	1	1	0	1	0	7

Sheet D	1	2	3	4	5	6	7	8	9	10	Final
Scotland (Muirhead)	0	0	1	0	2	0	0	2	0	0	5
Russia (Sidorova) 🔨	0	2	0	1	0	2	1	0	1	2	9

=== Draw 17 ===
Thursday, March 25, 19:30

Sheet A	1	2	3	4	5	6	7	8	9	10	11	Final
Norway (Githmark)	0	1	0	1	0	2	0	2	0	1	0	7
Denmark (Jensen) 🔨	0	0	2	0	2	0	2	0	1	0	2	9

Sheet B	1	2	3	4	5	6	7	8	9	10	Final
Canada (Jones) 🔨	2	0	0	1	0	2	3	0	0	X	8
Scotland (Muirhead)	0	2	0	0	1	0	0	1	1	X	5

Sheet C	1	2	3	4	5	6	7	8	9	10	Final
Switzerland (Feltscher)	0	0	1	1	0	0	0	0	X	X	2
Germany (Schöpp) 🔨	2	0	0	0	2	1	1	2	X	X	8

Sheet D	1	2	3	4	5	6	7	8	9	10	Final
Sweden (Östlund) 🔨	1	0	1	0	0	0	2	0	X	X	4
China (Wang)	0	2	0	1	1	2	0	3	X	X	9

== Tie-breaker ==
Friday, March 26, 12:30

Sheet A	1	2	3	4	5	6	7	8	9	10	Final
Sweden (Östlund) 🔨	2	0	3	0	0	4	0	1	0	1	11
United States (Brown)	0	2	0	1	2	0	1	0	2	0	8

Player Percentages
Sweden		United States	
Lotta Lennartsson	84%	Laura Hallisey	79%
Anna Domeij	71%	Ann Swisshelm	66%
Sara Carlsson	90%	Nina Spatola	68%
Cecilia Östlund	74%	Erika Brown	64%
Total	80%	Total	69%

== Playoffs ==
Page playoff system
1	Canada	3
2	Germany	6
3	Scotland	8
4	Sweden	3

Semifinal
1	Canada	4
3	Scotland	10

Gold Medal Game
2	Germany	8
3	Scotland	6

Bronze Medal Game
1	Canada	9
4	Sweden	6

=== 1 vs. 2 ===
Friday, March 26, 8:00 pm

Sheet C	1	2	3	4	5	6	7	8	9	10	Final
Canada (Jones) 🔨	0	0	1	1	0	0	0	1	0	X	3
Germany (Schöpp)	0	0	0	0	0	1	1	0	4	X	6

Player Percentages
Canada		Germany	
Dawn Askin	85%	Corinna Scholz	75%
Jill Officer	81%	Monika Wagner	74%
Cathy Overton-Clapham	89%	Melanie Robillard	76%
Jennifer Jones	82%	Andrea Schöpp	91%
Total	84%	Total	79%

=== 3 vs. 4 ===
Saturday, March 27, 12:00

Sheet C	1	2	3	4	5	6	7	8	9	10	Final
Scotland (Muirhead) 🔨	1	0	2	0	3	0	2	0	X	X	8
Sweden (Östlund)	0	1	0	0	0	1	0	1	X	X	3

Player Percentages
Scotland		Sweden	
Anne Laird	78%	Lotta Lennartsson	83%
Lorna Vevers	73%	Anna Domeij	77%
Kelly Wood	91%	Sara Carlsson	59%
Eve Muirhead	95%	Cecilia Östlund	70%
Total	85%	Total	72%

=== Semifinal ===
Saturday, March 27, 17:00

Sheet C	1	2	3	4	5	6	7	8	9	10	Final
Canada (Jones) 🔨	2	0	0	1	0	0	0	1	X	X	4
Scotland (Muirhead)	0	1	2	0	3	1	3	0	X	X	10

Player Percentages
Canada		Scotland	
Dawn Askin	95%	Anne Laird	92%
Jill Officer	84%	Lorna Vevers	73%
Cathy Overton-Clapham	70%	Kelly Wood	81%
Jennifer Jones	59%	Eve Muirhead	89%
Total	77%	Total	84%

=== Bronze medal game ===
Sunday, March 28, 10:00 am

Sheet C	1	2	3	4	5	6	7	8	9	10	Final
Canada (Jones) 🔨	0	1	1	1	0	4	0	0	2	X	9
Sweden (Östlund)	1	0	0	0	1	0	3	1	0	X	6

Player Percentages
Canada		Sweden	
Dawn Askin	91%	Lotta Lennartsson	94%
Jill Officer	100%	Anna Domeij	78%
Cathy Overton-Clapham	89%	Sara Carlsson	78%
Jennifer Jones	75%	Cecilia Östlund	68%
Total	89%	Total	79%

=== Gold medal game ===
Sunday, March 28, 15:00

Sheet C	1	2	3	4	5	6	7	8	9	10	11	Final
Germany (Schöpp) 🔨	1	0	2	0	1	0	1	1	0	0	2	8
Scotland (Muirhead)	0	2	0	1	0	2	0	0	0	1	0	6

Player Percentages
Germany		Scotland	
Stella Heiß	82%	Anne Laird	82%
Monika Wagner	84%	Lorna Vevers	73%
Melanie Robillard	68%	Kelly Wood	78%
Andrea Schöpp	67%	Eve Muirhead	77%
Total	75%	Total	78%

2010 Ford World Women's Curling Championship Winner
(Germany)
Germany
2nd title

== Top five player percentages ==
The top five player percentages for each position:

Leads	%	Seconds	%	Thirds	%	Skips	%
(Canada) Dawn Askin	92	(Canada) Jill Officer	85	(Canada) Cathy Overton-Clapham	88	(Canada) Jennifer Jones	85
(China) Zhou Yan	89	(Germany) Monika Wagner	83	(Sweden) Sara Carlsson	83	(Scotland) Eve Muirhead	85
(Russia) Ekaterina Galkina	88	(Scotland) Lorna Vevers	82	(Denmark) Denise Dupont	81	(Germany) Andrea Schöpp	78
(Denmark) Camilla Jensen	87	(Denmark) Angelina Jensen (Skip)	81	(Germany) Melanie Robillard	80	(China) Wang Bingyu	76
(Sweden) Liselotta Lennartsson	83	(Russia) Nkeiruka Ezekh	80	(Scotland) Kelly Wood	80	(Sweden) Cecilia Östlund	75
