= Sabina Kraupp =

Swedish curler (born 1986)

- Curler

Team
- Curling club: Sundbybergs CK
- Skip: Cecilia Östlund
- Third: Sabina Kraupp
- Second: Sara Carlsson
- Lead: Paulina Stein
- Alternate: Anna Huhta

Curling career
- World Championship: 3 (2008, 2010, 2012)
- World Mixed Doubles Championship: 1 (2011)
- European Championship: 2 (2011, 2015)
Medal record
Curling
Representing Sweden
World Junior Curling Championships
Silver medal – second place	2005 Pinerolo	Team
European Mixed Championship
Bronze medal – third place	2008 Kitzbühel

Sabina Kraupp (born 6 December 1986) is a Swedish curler. Kraupp plays third for team Cecilia Östlund in Karlstad and has won the Swedish Championship in 2015 and 2011. As a junior, she was alternate for the Swedish team at the 2005 World Junior Curling Championships in Pinerolo, winning a silver medal. She was also an alternate for the Swedish team at the 2010 Ford World Women's Curling Championship in Swift Current, Canada.
