= Cecilia Östlund =

Swedish curler

- Curler
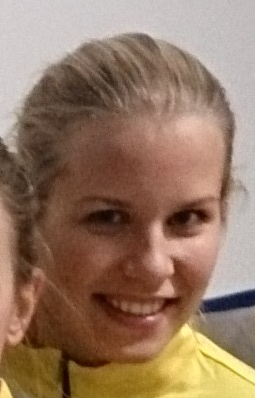
- Born: 10 January 1988 (age 38)

Team
- Curling club: Karlstads CK, Karlstad
- Fourth: Cecilia Östlund

Curling career
- World Championship: 2 (2010, 2011)
- European Championship: 1 (2015)
Medal record
Women's curling
Representing Sweden
World Championships
Gold medal – first place	2011 Esbjerg
World Junior Curling Championships
Silver medal – second place	2008 Östersund	Team

Cecilia "Cissi" Östlund (born 10 January 1988) is a Swedish curler. She was skip for the Swedish team at the 2008 World Junior Curling Championships in Östersund, winning a silver medal and she was the skip of the Swedish team at the 2010 Ford World Women's Curling Championship in Swift Current, Canada, finishing fourth

In June 2010 it was announced that Östlund's team would join forces with Anette Norberg, with Östlund playing third. This team won the 2011 World Women's Curling Championship.

Östlund would later become a skip again. She was the skip of team Sweden at the 2015 European Curling Championships. She led her rink of Sabina Kraupp, Sara Carlsson, Paulina Stein and Anna Huhta to a 5-4 record, finishing in 5th place.

While attending Karlstad University, Östlund represented the Swedish university curling team, skipped by Sara McManus at the 2015 Winter Universiade, finishing 4th.

She joined the Margaretha Sigfridsson rink in 2016, throwing last rocks for the team.

== Grand Slam record ==
Key
C	Champion
F	Lost in Final
SF	Lost in Semifinal
QF	Lost in Quarterfinals
R16	Lost in the round of 16
Q	Did not advance to playoffs
T2	Played in Tier 2 event
DNP	Did not participate in event
N/A	Not a Grand Slam event that season

Event	2014–15
Autumn Gold	Q
Masters	
Colonial Square	
Canadian Open	
Players'	

=== Former Events ===
Event	2011–12	2012–13	2013–14
Manitoba Liquor & Lotteries	Q	Q	DNP
