= Sara Carlsson =

Swedish curler

- Curler

Team
- Curling club: Karlstads CK, Karlstad
- Skip: Cecilia Östlund
- Third: Sabina Kraupp
- Second: Sara Carlsson
- Lead: Paulina Stein
- Alternate: Anna Huhta

Curling career
- World Championship: 2 (2010, 2011)
- European Championship: 1 (2015)
Medal record
Women's curling
Representing Sweden
World Championships
Gold medal – first place	2011 Esbjerg
World Junior Curling Championships
Silver medal – second place	2008 Östersund	Team

Sara Carlsson (born 26 December 1986) is a Swedish curler. She was third for the Swedish team at the 2008 World Junior Curling Championships in Östersund, winning a silver medal. She is third for the Swedish team at the 2010 Ford World Women's Curling Championship in Swift Current, Canada.

In 2017 she was inducted into the Swedish Curling Hall of Fame.
