= 2018 US Open of Curling =

- Host city: Blaine, Minnesota
- Arena: Four Seasons Curling Club
- Dates: December 28–31
- Men's winner: (United States) Heath McCormick
- Curling club: Four Seasons Curling Club; Blaine, Minnesota
- Skip: Heath McCormick
- Third: Chris Plys
- Second: Korey Dropkin
- Lead: Jake Higgs
- Finalist: (Saskatchewan) Adam Casey
- Women's winner: (United States) Jamie Sinclair
- Curling club: Four Seasons Curling Club; Blaine, Minnesota
- Skip: Jamie Sinclair
- Third: Alexandra Carlson
- Second: Vicky Persinger
- Lead: Monica Walker
- Finalist: (United States) Nina Roth

The 2018 US Open of Curling was held from December 31, 2017, to January 2, 2018.

== Men ==
=== Teams ===
| Skip | Third | Second | Lead | Locale |
|---|---|---|---|---|
| Todd Birr | John Benton | Hunter Clawson | Tom O'Connor | (United States) Blaine, Minnesota |
| Adam Casey | Brock Montgomery | Shaun Meachem | Dustin Kidby | Regina, Saskatchewan |
| Nick Connolly | Chase Sinnett | Andrew Dunam | Jonathan Harstad | (United States) Seattle, Washington |
| Scott Dunnam | Cody Clouser | Trevor Host | Ethan Meyers | (United States) Minneapolis, Minnesota |
| Pete Fenson | Shawn Rojeski | Mark Fenner | Alex Fenson | (United States) Bemidji, Minnesota |
| Colton Flasch | Kevin Marsh | Dan Marsh | Trent Knapp | Saskatoon, Saskatchewan |
| Heath McCormick | Chris Plys | Korey Dropkin | Thomas Howell | (United States) Blaine, Minnesota |
| Sean Beighton (Fourth) | Kroy Nernberger (Skip) | Derrick McLean | Quinn Evenson | (United States) Blaine, Minnesota |
| Cameron Rittenour | Jed Brundidge | Evan Workin | Jordan Brown | (United States) Sioux Falls, South Dakota |
| Greg Persinger (Fourth) | Rich Ruohonen (Skip) | Colin Hufman | Phil Tilker | (United States) Seattle, Washington |
| John Shuster | Tyler George | Joe Polo | John Landsteiner | (United States) Duluth, Minnesota |
| Andrew Stopera | Luc Violette | Ben Richardson | Graem Fenson | (United States) Chicago, Illinois |

=== Playoffs ===
Quarterfinals
(Saskatchewan) Colton Flasch | 4
(United States) Rich Ruohonen | 6
(United States) Todd Birr | 5
(United States) Pete Fenson | 3

Semifinals
(United States) Heath McCormick | 5
(United States) Rich Ruohonen | 2
(Saskatchewan) Adam Casey | 7
(United States) Todd Birr | 2

Final
(United States) Heath McCormick | 6
(Saskatchewan) Adam Casey | 5

== Women ==
=== Teams ===
| Skip | Third | Second | Lead | Locale |
|---|---|---|---|---|
| Sarah Anderson | Jenna Martin | Natalie Nicholson | Taylor Anderson | (United States) Blaine, Minnesota |
| Regan Birr | Emily Quello | Courtney Oskaken | Patti Olson | (United States) Blaine, Minnesota |
| Cora Farrell | Lexi Langian | Cait Flannery | Rebecca Miles | (United States) Blaine, Minnesota |
| Susan Froud | Lauren Horton | Margot Flemming | Megan Arnold | Waterloo, Ontario |
| Ann Podoll | Carissa Muller | Rachel Workin | Christina Lammers | (United States) Fargo, North Dakota |
| Allison Pottinger | Courtney George | Jordan Moulton | Stephanie Senneker | (United States) Saint Paul, Minnesota |
| Darcy Robertson | Karen Klein | Vanessa Foster | Theresa Cannon | Winnipeg, Manitoba |
| Nina Roth | Tabitha Peterson | Aileen Geving | Becca Hamilton | (United States) Blaine, Minnesota |
| Jamie Sinclair | Alexandra Carlson | Vicky Persinger | Monica Walker | (United States) Blaine, Minnesota |
| Briar Hürlimann (Fourth) | Elena Stern (Skip) | Lisa Gisler | Céline Koller | Wetzikon, Switzerland |

=== Knockout brackets ===
==== A Event ====
First Knockout
(United States) Regan Birr | 5
(United States) Cora Farrell | 6
(Switzerland) Elena Stern | 5
(United States) Ann Podoll | 3

Quarterfinals
(United States) Nina Roth | 6
(United States) Cora Farrell | 3
(Ontario) Susan Froud | 8
(United States) Sarah Anderson | 7
(United States) Jamie Sinclair | 7
(Switzerland) Elena Stern | 2
(Manitoba) Darcy Robertson | 2
(United States) Allison Pottinger | 5

Semifinals
(United States) Nina Roth | 3
(Ontario) Susan Froud | 7
(United States) Jamie Sinclair | 3
(United States) Allison Pottinger | 7

Qualifier 1
(Ontario) Susan Froud | 8
(United States) Allison Pottinger | 2

==== B Event ====
Second Knockout
(United States) Regan Birr | 1
(United States) Sarah Anderson | 9
(Manitoba) Darcy Robertson | 7
(United States) Ann Podoll | 2

Semifinals
(United States) Sarah Anderson | 0
(United States) Jamie Sinclair | 7
(United States) Nina Roth | 7
(Manitoba) Darcy Robertson | 6

Qualifier 2
(United States) Jamie Sinclair | 4
(United States) Nina Roth | 6

| Second Knockout | | Qualifier 3 |
| | | (Switzerland) Elena Stern | 2 |
| (Switzerland) Elena Stern | 6 | (United States) Allison Pottinger | 6 |
| (United States) Cora Farrell | 3 |

==== C Event ====
| Third Knockout | | Semifinals | | Qualifier 4 |
| | | (United States) Ann Podoll | 4 |
| (United States) Regan Birr | 6 | (United States) Cora Farrell | 5 |
| (United States) Ann Podoll | 8 | | | (United States) Jamie Sinclair | 10 |
| | | | | (United States) Cora Farrell | 3 |

| Third Knockout | | Qualifier 5 |
| | | (Manitoba) Darcy Robertson | 7 |
| (United States) Sarah Anderson | 6 | (Switzerland) Elena Stern | 4 |
| (Manitoba) Darcy Robertson | 8 |

=== Playoffs ===
| Quarterfinals | | Semifinals | | Final |
| | | (Ontario) Susan Froud | 3 |
| (Manitoba) Darcy Robertson | 2 | (United States) Jamie Sinclair | 5 |
| (United States) Jamie Sinclair | 6 | | | (United States) Jamie Sinclair | 5 |
| | | | | (United States) Nina Roth | 1 |
| | | (United States) Allison Pottinger | 5 |
| | | (United States) Nina Roth | 6 |
