= 2020 Women's Masters Basel =

World Curling Tour event

- Host city: Arlesheim, Switzerland
- Arena: Curlingzentrum Region Basel
- Dates: September 18–20
- Winner: (Sweden) Team Hasselborg
- Curling club: Sundbybergs CK, Sundbyberg
- Skip: Anna Hasselborg
- Third: Sara McManus
- Second: Agnes Knochenhauer
- Lead: Sofia Mabergs
- Finalist: (Switzerland) Raphaela Keiser

The 2020 Women's Masters Basel was held from September 18 to 20 at the Curlingzentrum Region Basel in Arlesheim, Switzerland as part of the World Curling Tour. The event was held in a round-robin format with a purse of 32,000 CHF. It was the first women's event of the 2020–21 curling season.

Olympic Gold Medalists Anna Hasselborg from Sweden defeated Raphaela Keiser from Switzerland in the final to win the event. Hasselborg finished the round robin with a perfect 4–0 record and won all three of their playoff games to claim the title. Team Keiser upset Swiss champions Elena Stern in the semifinal to qualify for the final. Keiser is coached by two-time world champion Binia Feltscher.

The event was intended to use a triple-knockout format, like previous years, but due to the COVID-19 pandemic many teams had to opt-out of the event, leaving a smaller field than usual.

== Teams ==
The teams are listed as follows:

Skip	Third	Second	Lead	Alternate	Locale
Anna Hasselborg	Sara McManus	Agnes Knochenhauer	Sofia Mabergs		Sundbyberg, Sweden
Corrie Hürlimann	Melina Bezzola	Jessica Jäggi	Anna Gut		Zug, Switzerland
Daniela Jentsch	Emira Abbes	Alina Androsova-Kaulfersch	Analena Jentsch	Pia-Lisa Schöll	Füssen, Germany
Selina Witschonke (Fourth)	Elena Mathis	Raphaela Keiser (Skip)	Marina Lörtscher		St. Moritz, Switzerland
Sarah Müller	Malin Da Ros	Marion Wüest	Eveline Matti	Selina Gafner	Biel, Switzerland
Fabienne Rieder	Xenia Schwaller	Tina Zürcher	Selina Rychiger	Nadine Rieder	Interlaken, Switzerland
Irene Schori	Carole Howald	Lara Stocker	Stefanie Berset		Langenthal, Switzerland
Celine Schwizgebel	Ophélie Gauchat	Marina Hauser	Joëlle Fuss	Emma Suter	Thun, Switzerland
Briar Hürlimann (Fourth)	Elena Stern (Skip)	Lisa Gisler	Céline Koller		Brig, Switzerland
Alina Pätz (Fourth)	Silvana Tirinzoni (Skip)	Esther Neuenschwander	Melanie Barbezat		Aarau, Switzerland
Isabella Wranå	Jennie Wåhlin	Almida de Val	Fanny Sjöberg		Sundbyberg, Sweden
Ladina Müller (Fourth)	Nora Wüest (Skip)	Anna Stern	Karin Winter	Lisa Gugler	Wetzikon, Switzerland
Veronica Zappone	Stefania Constantini	Angela Romei	Giulia Zardini Lacedelli	Elena Dami	Trentino, Italy

== Round-robin standings ==
Final round-robin standings

Key
Teams to Playoffs

Pool A	W	L	PF	PA	DSC
(Sweden) Anna Hasselborg	4	0	33	12	53.96
(Switzerland) Nora Wüest	3	1	20	16	53.94
(Germany) Daniela Jentsch	2	2	20	11	67.21
(Switzerland) Fabienne Rieder	1	3	14	32	83.54
(Switzerland) Sarah Müller	0	4	12	28	98.96

Pool B	W	L	PF	PA	DSC
(Switzerland) Irene Schori	3	0	20	6	64.03
(Switzerland) Elena Stern	2	1	19	10	23.13
(Switzerland) Celine Schwizgebel	1	2	12	23	55.20
(Italy) Veronica Zappone	0	3	10	22	114.09

Pool C	W	L	PF	PA	DSC
(Switzerland) Raphaela Keiser	2	1	17	13	41.03
(Switzerland) Silvana Tirinzoni	2	1	18	16	77.87
(Switzerland) Corrie Hürlimann	1	2	11	20	64.43
(Sweden) Isabella Wranå	1	2	16	13	72.24

== Round-robin results ==
All draw times listed in Central European Time.

=== Draw 1 ===
Friday, September 18, 9:00 am

Sheet 1	1	2	3	4	5	6	7	8	Final
(Sweden) Anna Hasselborg 🔨	3	0	0	0	3	1	6	X	13
(Switzerland) Fabienne Rieder	0	1	1	1	0	0	0	X	3

Sheet 2	1	2	3	4	5	6	7	8	Final
(Germany) Daniela Jentsch	0	1	2	0	0	0	1	0	4
(Switzerland) Nora Wüest 🔨	1	0	0	1	0	2	0	1	5

Sheet 4	1	2	3	4	5	6	7	8	Final
(Switzerland) Irene Schori 🔨	0	0	2	0	1	3	1	X	7
(Italy) Veronica Zappone	0	0	0	1	0	0	0	X	1

Sheet 5	1	2	3	4	5	6	7	8	Final
(Switzerland) Elena Stern 🔨	3	0	3	2	0	1	X	X	9
(Switzerland) Celine Schwizgebel	0	1	0	0	1	0	X	X	2

=== Draw 2 ===
Friday, September 18, 12:30 pm

Sheet 3	1	2	3	4	5	6	7	8	Final
(Switzerland) Raphaela Keiser 🔨	1	1	0	1	0	0	2	X	5
(Switzerland) Corrie Hürlimann	0	0	1	0	0	1	0	X	2

=== Draw 3 ===
Friday, September 18, 4:00 pm

Sheet 2	1	2	3	4	5	6	7	8	Final
(Sweden) Anna Hasselborg 🔨	3	0	2	0	1	0	2	X	8
(Switzerland) Sarah Müller	0	2	0	1	0	1	0	X	4

Sheet 3	1	2	3	4	5	6	7	8	Final
(Germany) Daniela Jentsch	0	3	0	3	2	X	X	X	8
(Switzerland) Fabienne Rieder 🔨	0	0	1	0	0	X	X	X	1

Sheet 4	1	2	3	4	5	6	7	8	Final
(Italy) Veronica Zappone	0	2	0	0	4	0	0	X	6
(Switzerland) Celine Schwizgebel 🔨	1	0	1	4	0	2	1	X	9

=== Draw 4 ===
Friday, September 18, 7:30 pm

Sheet 1	1	2	3	4	5	6	7	8	Final
(Switzerland) Nora Wüest 🔨	2	2	0	0	1	4	X	X	9
(Switzerland) Sarah Müller	0	0	0	2	0	0	X	X	2

Sheet 2	1	2	3	4	5	6	7	8	Final
(Sweden) Isabella Wranå	0	0	2	0	1	0	1	0	4
(Switzerland) Raphaela Keiser 🔨	0	1	0	3	0	1	0	1	6

Sheet 5	1	2	3	4	5	6	7	8	Final
(Switzerland) Silvana Tirinzoni	0	0	0	4	0	2	0	0	6
(Switzerland) Corrie Hürlimann 🔨	0	0	3	0	1	0	2	1	7

=== Draw 5 ===
Saturday, September 19, 9:00 am

Sheet 1	1	2	3	4	5	6	7	8	Final
(Switzerland) Elena Stern 🔨	2	0	0	1	2	1	0	X	6
(Italy) Veronica Zappone	0	1	1	0	0	0	1	X	3

Sheet 2	1	2	3	4	5	6	7	8	Final
(Switzerland) Irene Schori	0	1	3	4	X	X	X	X	8
(Switzerland) Celine Schwizgebel 🔨	1	0	0	0	X	X	X	X	1

Sheet 3	1	2	3	4	5	6	7	8	Final
(Sweden) Anna Hasselborg 🔨	0	2	0	2	1	2	X	X	7
(Switzerland) Nora Wüest	0	0	1	0	0	0	X	X	1

Sheet 5	1	2	3	4	5	6	7	8	Final
(Germany) Daniela Jentsch 🔨	0	0	0	1	1	1	1	X	4
(Switzerland) Sarah Müller	0	0	0	0	0	0	0	X	0

=== Draw 6 ===
Saturday, September 19, 12:30 pm

Sheet 1	1	2	3	4	5	6	7	8	Final
(Sweden) Isabella Wranå	0	3	2	4	0	X	X	X	9
(Switzerland) Corrie Hürlimann 🔨	1	0	0	0	1	X	X	X	2

Sheet 4	1	2	3	4	5	6	7	8	Final
(Switzerland) Silvana Tirinzoni	0	3	1	0	0	3	0	0	7
(Switzerland) Raphaela Keiser 🔨	1	0	0	1	1	0	2	1	6

=== Draw 7 ===
Saturday, September 19, 4:00 pm

Sheet 3	1	2	3	4	5	6	7	8	Final
(Switzerland) Elena Stern 🔨	1	0	0	1	1	0	1	0	4
(Switzerland) Irene Schori	0	0	2	0	0	2	0	1	5

Sheet 4	1	2	3	4	5	6	7	8	Final
(Sweden) Anna Hasselborg	0	0	1	0	0	2	0	2	5
(Germany) Daniela Jentsch 🔨	2	0	0	0	1	0	1	0	4

Sheet 5	1	2	3	4	5	6	7	8	Final
(Switzerland) Nora Wüest 🔨	1	1	1	0	1	0	0	1	5
(Switzerland) Fabienne Rieder	0	0	0	1	0	1	1	0	3

=== Draw 8 ===
Saturday, September 19, 7:30 pm

Sheet 3	1	2	3	4	5	6	7	8	Final
(Switzerland) Silvana Tirinzoni	0	0	1	0	2	1	1	0	5
(Sweden) Isabella Wranå 🔨	0	1	0	1	0	0	0	1	3

Sheet 4	1	2	3	4	5	6	7	8	Final
(Switzerland) Sarah Müller 🔨	0	1	0	3	0	0	2	0	6
(Switzerland) Fabienne Rieder	0	0	1	0	2	1	0	3	7

== Playoffs ==
Quarterfinals
C1	(Switzerland) Raphaela Keiser	6
C3	(Switzerland) Corrie Hürlimann	5
B2	(Switzerland) Elena Stern	5
A2	(Switzerland) Nora Wüest	4
A1	(Sweden) Anna Hasselborg	7
B3	(Switzerland) Celine Schwizgebel	1
B1	(Switzerland) Irene Schori	7
C2	(Switzerland) Silvana Tirinzoni	8

Semifinals
C1	(Switzerland) Raphaela Keiser	9
B2	(Switzerland) Elena Stern	4
A1	(Sweden) Anna Hasselborg	6
C2	(Switzerland) Silvana Tirinzoni	4

Final
C1	(Switzerland) Raphaela Keiser	2
A1	(Sweden) Anna Hasselborg	8

=== Quarterfinals ===
Sunday, September 20, 8:00 am

Sheet 1	1	2	3	4	5	6	7	8	9	Final
(Switzerland) Raphaela Keiser 🔨	1	1	0	1	0	1	1	0	1	6
(Switzerland) Corrie Hürlimann	0	0	1	0	2	0	0	2	0	5

Sheet 2	1	2	3	4	5	6	7	8	9	Final
(Switzerland) Elena Stern 🔨	0	1	1	0	0	2	0	0	1	5
(Switzerland) Nora Wüest	0	0	0	1	1	0	1	1	0	4

Sheet 4	1	2	3	4	5	6	7	8	9	Final
(Switzerland) Irene Schori 🔨	1	0	0	3	0	1	0	2	0	7
(Switzerland) Silvana Tirinzoni	0	0	2	0	2	0	3	0	1	8

Sheet 5	1	2	3	4	5	6	7	8	Final
(Sweden) Anna Hasselborg 🔨	2	2	0	2	1	X	X	X	7
(Switzerland) Celine Schwizgebel	0	0	1	0	0	X	X	X	1

=== Semifinals ===
Sunday, September 20, 11:30 am

Sheet 2	1	2	3	4	5	6	7	8	Final
(Sweden) Anna Hasselborg 🔨	1	0	1	0	0	3	0	1	6
(Switzerland) Silvana Tirinzoni	0	0	0	1	2	0	1	0	4

Sheet 4	1	2	3	4	5	6	7	8	Final
(Switzerland) Raphaela Keiser 🔨	1	3	0	4	1	0	X	X	9
(Switzerland) Elena Stern	0	0	1	0	0	3	X	X	4

=== Final ===
Sunday, September 20, 3:00 pm

Sheet 3	1	2	3	4	5	6	7	8	Final
(Switzerland) Raphaela Keiser	0	0	0	0	2	0	X	X	2
(Sweden) Anna Hasselborg 🔨	2	1	2	1	0	2	X	X	8
