= Swiss Cup (disambiguation) =

The Swiss Cup is an annual football tournament in Switzerland.

Swiss Cup may also refer to these competitions in Switzerland:

- Swiss Cup (basketball) or Patrick Baumann Swiss Cup, an annual professional basketball competition
- Swiss Cup (gymnastics) or Swiss Cup Zürich, an annual artistic gymnastics competition
- Swiss Cup (ice hockey), a national tournament 1957–2021
- Swiss Cup Basel, a curling tournament
- Schweizer Cup (curling), an annual bonspiel in Baden

== See also ==
- Swiss-system tournament, a non-eliminating competition format
