= 2021 Swiss Women's Curling Championship =

- Host city: Arlesheim, Switzerland
- Arena: Curlingzentrum Region Basel
- Dates: February 6–13
- Winner: (Aargau) Team Tirinzoni
- Curling club: CC Aarau, Aarau
- Skip: Silvana Tirinzoni
- Fourth: Alina Pätz
- Second: Esther Neuenschwander
- Lead: Melanie Barbezat
- Alternate: Marlene Albrecht
- Coach: Pierre Charette
- Finalist: (Valais) Elena Stern

The 2021 Swiss Women's Curling Championship, Switzerland's national women's curling championship, was held from February 6 to 13 at the Curlingzentrum Region Basel in Arlesheim, Switzerland. The winning Silvana Tirinzoni rink then played against the 2020 Swiss champion Elena Stern rink for the right represent Switzerland at the 2021 World Women's Curling Championship.

The event was held between four teams playing in a triple round robin. The top two teams played a best of three to determine the winner while the bottom two teams played in the bronze medal game. Team Silvana Tirinzoni finished the event with a perfect 11–0 record and defeated Team Elena Stern two games to zero in the best of three final.

== Teams ==
The teams are listed as follows:

Club	Skip	Third	Second	Lead	Alternate	Locale
CC St. Moritz	Selina Witschonke (Fourth)	Elena Mathis	Raphaela Keiser (Skip)	Marina Lörtscher		(Grisons) St. Moritz
CC Langenthal	Irene Schori	Carole Howald	Lara Stocker	Stefanie Berset	Malin Da Ros	(Canton of Bern) Langenthal
CC Oberwallis	Briar Hürlimann (Fourth)	Elena Stern (Skip)	Lisa Gisler	Céline Koller	Sarah Müller	(Valais) Brig-Glis
CC Aarau	Alina Pätz (Fourth)	Silvana Tirinzoni (Skip)	Esther Neuenschwander	Melanie Barbezat	Marlene Albrecht	(Aargau) Aarau

== Round-robin standings ==
Final round-robin standings

Key
Teams to Championship Round

Skip	W	L	PF	PA	EW	EL	BE	SE
(Aargau) Silvana Tirinzoni (Aarau)	9	0	72	41	41	29	6	11
(Valais) Elena Stern (Oberwallis)	4	5	54	55	35	36	7	11
(Grisons) Raphaela Keiser (St. Moritz)	3	6	48	63	36	37	5	11
(Canton of Bern) Irene Schori (Langenthal)	2	7	49	64	33	43	4	5

== Round-robin results ==
All draw times are listed in Central European Time (UTC+01:00).

=== Draw 1 ===
Saturday, February 6, 7:30 pm

Sheet 2	1	2	3	4	5	6	7	8	9	10	11	Final
(Valais) Elena Stern	0	0	2	0	2	0	3	0	0	1	0	8
(Aargau) Silvana Tirinzoni 🔨	0	2	0	2	0	1	0	2	1	0	1	9

Sheet 3	1	2	3	4	5	6	7	8	9	10	Final
(Canton of Bern) Irene Schori 🔨	1	0	1	1	0	0	2	0	0	3	8
(Grisons) Raphaela Keiser	0	1	0	0	1	1	0	2	0	0	5

=== Draw 2 ===
Sunday, February 7, 2:00 pm

Sheet 3	1	2	3	4	5	6	7	8	9	10	Final
(Grisons) Raphaela Keiser 🔨	0	1	1	1	1	0	1	2	1	X	8
(Valais) Elena Stern	1	0	0	0	0	1	0	0	0	X	2

Sheet 4	1	2	3	4	5	6	7	8	9	10	11	Final
(Canton of Bern) Irene Schori 🔨	0	0	2	0	1	0	0	1	0	1	0	5
(Aargau) Silvana Tirinzoni	0	1	0	1	0	0	2	0	1	0	1	6

=== Draw 3 ===
Monday, February 8, 9:00 am

Sheet 2	1	2	3	4	5	6	7	8	9	10	Final
(Aargau) Silvana Tirinzoni 🔨	1	2	0	3	0	4	0	X	X	X	10
(Grisons) Raphaela Keiser	0	0	2	0	1	0	1	X	X	X	4

Sheet 4	1	2	3	4	5	6	7	8	9	10	Final
(Valais) Elena Stern 🔨	0	0	1	5	0	1	3	X	X	X	10
(Canton of Bern) Irene Schori	0	2	0	0	2	0	0	X	X	X	4

=== Draw 4 ===
Monday, February 8, 7:30 pm

Sheet 2	1	2	3	4	5	6	7	8	9	10	Final
(Grisons) Raphaela Keiser	0	1	0	0	2	0	2	0	1	2	8
(Canton of Bern) Irene Schori 🔨	1	0	1	1	0	2	0	1	0	0	6

Sheet 4	1	2	3	4	5	6	7	8	9	10	Final
(Aargau) Silvana Tirinzoni 🔨	2	0	2	0	0	2	1	0	0	X	7
(Valais) Elena Stern	0	1	0	1	0	0	0	2	0	X	4

=== Draw 5 ===
Tuesday, February 9, 2:00 pm

Sheet 2	1	2	3	4	5	6	7	8	9	10	Final
(Canton of Bern) Irene Schori	0	2	0	1	0	0	0	0	2	0	5
(Valais) Elena Stern 🔨	0	0	1	0	2	1	0	2	0	1	7

Sheet 3	1	2	3	4	5	6	7	8	9	10	Final
(Grisons) Raphaela Keiser	0	0	1	0	0	1	0	X	X	X	2
(Aargau) Silvana Tirinzoni 🔨	0	1	0	2	1	0	4	X	X	X	8

=== Draw 6 ===
Wednesday, February 10, 9:00 am

Sheet 2	1	2	3	4	5	6	7	8	9	10	Final
(Aargau) Silvana Tirinzoni	0	0	3	1	0	1	0	1	0	0	6
(Canton of Bern) Irene Schori 🔨	0	1	0	0	1	0	1	0	1	0	4

Sheet 4	1	2	3	4	5	6	7	8	9	10	11	Final
(Valais) Elena Stern	0	0	0	0	2	0	2	0	1	0	1	6
(Grisons) Raphaela Keiser 🔨	0	1	0	1	0	1	0	0	0	2	0	5

=== Draw 7 ===
Wednesday, February 10, 7:30 pm

Sheet 3	1	2	3	4	5	6	7	8	9	10	Final
(Canton of Bern) Irene Schori	0	0	1	2	0	0	3	0	1	0	7
(Valais) Elena Stern 🔨	0	1	0	0	1	1	0	1	0	1	5

Sheet 4	1	2	3	4	5	6	7	8	9	10	Final
(Grisons) Raphaela Keiser	0	0	0	2	0	1	0	3	1	0	7
(Aargau) Silvana Tirinzoni 🔨	2	0	0	0	3	0	1	0	0	2	8

=== Draw 8 ===
Thursday, February 11, 2:00 pm

Sheet 3	1	2	3	4	5	6	7	8	9	10	Final
(Valais) Elena Stern 🔨	1	0	0	1	0	1	0	0	0	X	3
(Aargau) Silvana Tirinzoni	0	0	2	0	1	0	3	1	1	X	8

Sheet 4	1	2	3	4	5	6	7	8	9	10	11	Final
(Canton of Bern) Irene Schori	0	1	0	1	0	0	3	0	1	0	0	6
(Grisons) Raphaela Keiser 🔨	1	0	2	0	0	1	0	1	0	1	1	7

=== Draw 9 ===
Friday, February 12, 9:00 am

Sheet 2	1	2	3	4	5	6	7	8	9	10	Final
(Valais) Elena Stern 🔨	0	0	0	0	3	1	2	2	1	X	9
(Grisons) Raphaela Keiser	0	0	0	2	0	0	0	0	0	X	2

Sheet 3	1	2	3	4	5	6	7	8	9	10	Final
(Aargau) Silvana Tirinzoni 🔨	2	0	3	1	2	0	2	X	X	X	10
(Canton of Bern) Irene Schori	0	1	0	0	0	3	0	X	X	X	4

== Bronze medal game ==
Saturday, February 13, 9:00 am

Sheet 4	1	2	3	4	5	6	7	8	9	10	Final
(Grisons) Raphaela Keiser 🔨	1	1	1	0	0	0	0	1	1	X	5
(Canton of Bern) Irene Schori	0	0	0	0	1	1	0	0	0	X	2

== Championship Round ==
Best of three
1	(Aargau) Silvana Tirinzoni	6	6	X
2	(Valais) Elena Stern	4	5	X

=== Game 1 ===
Friday, February 12, 7:30 pm

Sheet 4	1	2	3	4	5	6	7	8	9	10	11	Final
(Aargau) Silvana Tirinzoni 🔨	0	0	1	0	1	0	0	1	0	1	2	6
(Valais) Elena Stern	0	0	0	1	0	0	1	0	2	0	0	4

=== Game 2 ===
Saturday, February 13, 9:00 am

Sheet 2	1	2	3	4	5	6	7	8	9	10	11	Final
(Aargau) Silvana Tirinzoni	0	1	0	2	0	1	0	1	0	0	1	6
(Valais) Elena Stern 🔨	1	0	1	0	1	0	1	0	0	1	0	5

2021 Swiss Women's Curling Championship
(Switzerland)
Silvana Tirinzoni
5th Swiss Championship title
