= 2019 Canad Inns Women's Classic =

World Curling Tour event

- Host city: Portage la Prairie, Manitoba
- Arena: Portage Curling Club
- Dates: October 17–20
- Winner: (Switzerland) Team Stern
- Curling club: CC Oberwallis, Brig-Glis
- Skip: Elena Stern
- Fourth: Briar Hürlimann
- Second: Lisa Gisler
- Lead: Céline Koller
- Finalist: (Ontario) Rachel Homan

The 2019 Canad Inns Women's Classic was held from October 17 to 20 at the Portage Curling Club in Portage la Prairie, Manitoba as part of the World Curling Tour. The event was held in a triple-knockout format with a purse of $60,000.

In the final, Elena Stern of Switzerland defeated Rachel Homan of Ottawa, Ontario by stealing one in an extra end to claim the title.

== Teams ==
The teams are listed as follows:

Skip	Third	Second	Lead	Locale
Skylar Ackerman	Emily Haupstein	Taylor Stremick	Abbey Johnson	Saskatoon, Saskatchewan
Abby Ackland	Hailey Ryan	Emilie Rafnson	Sara Oliver	Winnipeg, Manitoba
Sherry Anderson	Nancy Martin	Meaghan Frerichs	Chaelynn Kitz	Saskatoon, Saskatchewan
Chrissy Cadorin	Joanne Curtis	Mallory Kean	Laura LaBonte	St. Thomas, Ontario
Theresa Cannon	Karen Klein	Vanessa Foster	Raunora Westcott	Winnipeg, Manitoba
Jennifer Clark-Rouire	Lisa McLeod	Jolene Callum	Rachel Burtnyk	Miami, Manitoba
Kerri Einarson	Val Sweeting	Shannon Birchard	Briane Meilleur	Gimli, Manitoba
Tracy Fleury	Selena Njegovan	Liz Fyfe	Kristin MacCuish	East St. Paul, Manitoba
Kerry Galusha	Sarah Koltun	Jo-Ann Rizzo	Shona Barbour	Yellowknife, Northwest Territories
Gim Un-chi	Um Min-ji	Kim Su-ji	Seol Ye-eun	Uijeongbu, Gyeonggi-do, South Korea
Amber Holland	Cindy Ricci	Laura Strong	Debbie Lozinski	Regina, Saskatchewan
Rachel Homan	Emma Miskew	Joanne Courtney	Lisa Weagle	Ottawa, Ontario
Lauren Horton	Carly Howard	Margot Flemming	Megan Arnold	Waterloo, Ontario
Daniela Jentsch	Emira Abbes	Klara-Hermine Fomm	Analena Jentsch	Füssen, Germany
Jennifer Jones	Kaitlyn Lawes	Jocelyn Peterman	Dawn McEwen	Winnipeg, Manitoba
Kim Eun-jung	Kim Kyeong-ae	Kim Cho-hi	Kim Yeong-mi	Uiseong, South Korea
Kim Min-ji	Ha Seung-youn	Kim Hye-rin	Yang Tae-i	Chuncheon, South Korea
Tori Koana	Yuna Kotani	Mao Ishigaki	Arisa Kotani	Yamanashi, Japan
Eve Muirhead	Lauren Gray	Jennifer Dodds	Vicky Wright	Stirling, Scotland
Ikue Kitazawa (Fourth)	Chiaki Matsumura	Seina Nakajima (Skip)	Hasumi Ishigooka	Nagano, Japan
Beth Peterson	Jenna Loder	Katherine Doerksen	Nicole Sigvaldason	Winnipeg, Manitoba
Darcy Robertson	Laura Burtnyk	Gaetanne Gauthier	Krysten Karwacki	Winnipeg, Manitoba
Kelsey Rocque	Danielle Schmiemann	Becca Hebert	Jesse Marlow	Edmonton, Alberta
Nina Roth	Tabitha Peterson	Becca Hamilton	Aileen Geving	McFarland, United States
Jamie Sinclair	Cory Christensen	Vicky Persinger	Sarah Anderson	Chaska, United States
Laurie St-Georges	Hailey Armstrong	Emily Riley	Cynthia St-Georges	Montreal, Quebec
Briar Hürlimann (Fourth)	Elena Stern (Skip)	Lisa Gisler	Céline Koller	Brig-Glis, Switzerland
Alina Pätz (Fourth)	Silvana Tirinzoni (Skip)	Esther Neuenschwander	Melanie Barbezat	Aarau, Switzerland
Laura Walker	Kate Cameron	Taylor McDonald	Nadine Scotland	Edmonton, Alberta
Kristy Watling	Christine MacKay	Taylor Maida	Katrina Thiessen	Manitoba
Sayaka Yoshimura	Kaho Onodera	Anna Ohmiya	Yumie Funayama	Sapporo, Japan
Mackenzie Zacharias	Karlee Burgess	Emily Zacharias	Lauren Lenentine	Winnipeg, Manitoba

== Knockout brackets ==
=== A event ===
First Knockout
(Ontario) Lauren Horton	8
(Alberta) Kelsey Rocque	3
(Japan) Sayaka Yoshimura	7
(Manitoba) Darcy Robertson	3
(South Korea) Gim Un-chi	2
(Alberta) Laura Walker	6
(Manitoba) Kerri Einarson	6
(Manitoba) Mackenzie Zacharias	3
(Switzerland) Silvana Tirinzoni	7
(Quebec) Laurie St-Georges	6
(South Korea) Kim Min-ji
(United States) Jamie Sinclair	WO
(Japan) Seina Nakajima	6
(Saskatchewan) Sherry Anderson	5
(Scotland) Eve Muirhead	8
(Ontario) Chrissy Cadorin	1

Quarterfinals
(Ontario) Lauren Horton	8
(Japan) Sayaka Yoshimura	1
(Alberta) Laura Walker	7
(Manitoba) Kerri Einarson	2
(Switzerland) Silvana Tirinzoni	4
(United States) Jamie Sinclair	5
(Japan) Seina Nakajima	4
(Scotland) Eve Muirhead	6

Semifinals
(Ontario) Lauren Horton	3
(Alberta) Laura Walker	9
(United States) Jamie Sinclair	4
(Scotland) Eve Muirhead	6

Qualifier 1
(Alberta) Laura Walker	9
(Scotland) Eve Muirhead	8

First Knockout
(Manitoba) Theresa Cannon	7
(Northwest Territories) Kerry Galusha	6
(Switzerland) Elena Stern	9
(Manitoba) Jennifer Clark-Rouire	6
(Ontario) Rachel Homan	8
(Saskatchewan) Skylar Ackerman	7
(South Korea) Kim Eun-jung	7
(Manitoba) Beth Peterson	4
(Manitoba) Tracy Fleury	6
(Manitoba) Kristy Watling	4
(Germany) Daniela Jentsch	5
(Saskatchewan) Amber Holland	3
(Manitoba) Jennifer Jones	9
(Manitoba) Abby Ackland	3
(United States) Nina Roth	4
(Japan) Tori Koana	7

Quarterfinals
(Manitoba) Theresa Cannon	5
(Switzerland) Elena Stern	7
(Ontario) Rachel Homan	5
(South Korea) Kim Eun-jung	1
(Manitoba) Tracy Fleury	4
(Germany) Daniela Jentsch	5
(Manitoba) Jennifer Jones	4
(Japan) Tori Koana	6

Semifinals
(Switzerland) Elena Stern	3
(Ontario) Rachel Homan	8
(Germany) Daniela Jentsch	8
(Japan) Tori Koana	4

Qualifier 2
(Ontario) Rachel Homan	6
(Germany) Daniela Jentsch	4

=== B event ===
Second Knockout
(Alberta) Kelsey Rocque	6
(Manitoba) Darcy Robertson	4
(South Korea) Gim Un-chi	5
(Manitoba) Mackenzie Zacharias	7

Quarterfinals
(Japan) Seina Nakajima	7
(Alberta) Kelsey Rocque	5
(Switzerland) Silvana Tirinzoni	6
(Manitoba) Mackenzie Zacharias	3

Semifinals
(Japan) Seina Nakajima	6
(Switzerland) Elena Stern	9
(Switzerland) Silvana Tirinzoni	9
(Japan) Tori Koana	6

To Qualifier 3
(Switzerland) Elena Stern	6
(Switzerland) Silvana Tirinzoni	5
Qualifier 3
(Switzerland) Elena Stern	4
(Manitoba) Kerri Einarson	6

Second Knockout
(Quebec) Laurie St-Georges	2
(South Korea) Kim Min-ji	6
(Saskatchewan) Sherry Anderson	7
(Ontario) Chrissy Cadorin	1

Quarterfinals
(Manitoba) Kerri Einarson	4
(South Korea) Kim Min-ji	3
(Japan) Sayaka Yoshimura	5
(Saskatchewan) Sherry Anderson	8

Semifinals
(Manitoba) Kerri Einarson	6
(Saskatchewan) Sherry Anderson	2

To Qualifier 3
(Manitoba) Kerri Einarson	6
(Germany) Daniela Jentsch	2

Second Knockout
(Northwest Territories) Kerry Galusha	5
(Manitoba) Jennifer Clark-Rouire	3
(Saskatchewan) Skylar Ackerman	9
(Manitoba) Beth Peterson	6

Quarterfinals
(Manitoba) Jennifer Jones	4
(Northwest Territories) Kerry Galusha	5
(Manitoba) Tracy Fleury	6
(Saskatchewan) Skylar Ackerman	5

Semifinals
(Northwest Territories) Kerry Galusha	4
(Ontario) Lauren Horton	7
(Manitoba) Tracy Fleury	8
(United States) Jamie Sinclair	2

To Qualifier 4
(Ontario) Lauren Horton	5
(Manitoba) Tracy Fleury	7
Qualifier 4
(Manitoba) Tracy Fleury	1
(Scotland) Eve Muirhead	7

Second Knockout
(Manitoba) Kristy Watling	2
(Saskatchewan) Amber Holland	7
(Manitoba) Abby Ackland	0
(United States) Nina Roth	8

Quarterfinals
(South Korea) Kim Eun-jung	8
(Saskatchewan) Amber Holland	5
(Manitoba) Theresa Cannon	6
(United States) Nina Roth	7

Semifinals
(South Korea) Kim Eun-jung	7
(United States) Nina Roth	0

To Qualifier 4
(South Korea) Kim Eun-jung	2
(Scotland) Eve Muirhead	6

=== C event ===
Third Knockout
(Manitoba) Darcy Robertson	4
(South Korea) Gim Un-chi	7
(Quebec) Laurie St-Georges	8
(Ontario) Chrissy Cadorin	3

Quarterfinals
(Northwest Territories) Kerry Galusha	4
(South Korea) Gim Un-chi	8
(United States) Jamie Sinclair	8
(Quebec) Laurie St-Georges	2

Semifinals
(South Korea) Gim Un-chi	3
(United States) Jamie Sinclair	7

Qualifier 5
(United States) Jamie Sinclair	2
(Switzerland) Elena Stern	7

Third Knockout
(Alberta) Kelsey Rocque	7
(Manitoba) Mackenzie Zacharias	8

Quarterfinals
(South Korea) Kim Min-ji	5
(Japan) Sayaka Yoshimura	4
(United States) Nina Roth	7
(Manitoba) Mackenzie Zacharias	9

Semifinals
(South Korea) Kim Min-ji	4
(Switzerland) Silvana Tirinzoni	5
(Manitoba) Mackenzie Zacharias	7
(Ontario) Lauren Horton	0

Qualifier 6
(Switzerland) Silvana Tirinzoni	3
(Manitoba) Mackenzie Zacharias	2

Third Knockout
(Manitoba) Jennifer Jones	8
(Saskatchewan) Skylar Ackerman	3

Quarterfinals
(Japan) Seina Nakajima	5
(Manitoba) Jennifer Jones	4
(Saskatchewan) Amber Holland	6
(Manitoba) Theresa Cannon	7

Semifinals
(Japan) Seina Nakajima	5
(South Korea) Kim Eun-jung	6
(Manitoba) Theresa Cannon	0
(Germany) Daniela Jentsch	7

Qualifier 7
(South Korea) Kim Eun-jung	5
(Germany) Daniela Jentsch	3

Third Knockout
(Manitoba) Jennifer Clark-Rouire	4
(Manitoba) Beth Peterson	10
(Manitoba) Kristy Watling	4
(Manitoba) Abby Ackland	6

Quarterfinals
(Japan) Tori Koana	3
(Manitoba) Beth Peterson	8
(Saskatchewan) Sherry Anderson	8
(Manitoba) Abby Ackland	3

Semifinals
(Manitoba) Beth Peterson	5
(Saskatchewan) Sherry Anderson	4

Qualifier 8
(Manitoba) Beth Peterson	1
(Manitoba) Tracy Fleury	10

== Knockout results ==
All draw times listed in Central Time.

=== Draw 1 ===
Thursday, October 17, 10:00 am

Sheet 1	1	2	3	4	5	6	7	8	Final
(Ontario) Lauren Horton 🔨	2	0	0	3	1	2	X	X	8
(Alberta) Kelsey Rocque	0	1	2	0	0	0	X	X	3

Sheet 2	1	2	3	4	5	6	7	8	Final
(Scotland) Eve Muirhead	0	1	1	0	3	3	X	X	8
(Ontario) Chrissy Cadorin 🔨	1	0	0	0	0	0	X	X	1

Sheet 3	1	2	3	4	5	6	7	8	Final
(South Korea) Gim Un-chi 🔨	0	0	0	0	0	0	2	X	2
(Alberta) Laura Walker	1	0	1	0	1	3	0	X	6

Sheet 4	1	2	3	4	5	6	7	8	Final
(Manitoba) Kerri Einarson	0	1	0	1	2	1	1	X	6
(Manitoba) Mackenzie Zacharias 🔨	2	0	1	0	0	0	0	X	3

Sheet 5	1	2	3	4	5	6	7	8	9	Final
(Switzerland) Silvana Tirinzoni 🔨	2	1	0	2	0	1	0	0	1	7
(Quebec) Laurie St-Georges	0	0	1	0	2	0	1	2	0	6

Sheet 6	1	2	3	4	5	6	7	8	Final
(Japan) Sayaka Yoshimura	0	2	0	0	4	0	1	X	7
(Manitoba) Darcy Robertson 🔨	1	0	0	1	0	1	0	X	3

Sheet 7	1	2	3	4	5	6	7	8	9	Final
(Japan) Seina Nakajima 🔨	1	2	0	1	0	0	1	0	1	6
(Saskatchewan) Sherry Anderson	0	0	1	0	2	0	0	2	0	5

Sheet 8	Final
(South Korea) Kim Min-ji	L
(United States) Jamie Sinclair	W

=== Draw 2 ===
Thursday, October 17, 1:30 pm

Sheet 1	1	2	3	4	5	6	7	8	Final
(Manitoba) Theresa Cannon 🔨	0	0	3	0	3	1	0	0	7
(Northwest Territories) Kerry Galusha	0	1	0	1	0	0	3	1	6

Sheet 2	1	2	3	4	5	6	7	8	Final
(Switzerland) Elena Stern 🔨	0	2	0	3	0	2	0	2	9
(Manitoba) Jennifer Clark-Rouire	0	0	1	0	3	0	2	0	6

Sheet 3	1	2	3	4	5	6	7	8	Final
(Ontario) Rachel Homan	1	0	2	0	0	3	0	2	8
(Saskatchewan) Skylar Ackerman 🔨	0	2	0	2	2	0	1	0	7

Sheet 4	1	2	3	4	5	6	7	8	Final
(South Korea) Kim Eun-jung	5	1	0	0	0	1	0	X	7
(Manitoba) Beth Peterson 🔨	0	0	0	2	1	0	1	X	4

Sheet 5	1	2	3	4	5	6	7	8	Final
(Manitoba) Jennifer Jones 🔨	0	2	0	4	0	0	3	X	9
(Manitoba) Abby Ackland	1	0	0	0	1	1	0	X	3

Sheet 6	1	2	3	4	5	6	7	8	Final
(Manitoba) Tracy Fleury 🔨	0	0	1	0	3	1	0	1	6
(Manitoba) Kristy Watling	0	0	0	2	0	0	2	0	4

Sheet 7	1	2	3	4	5	6	7	8	Final
(United States) Nina Roth 🔨	1	0	1	0	0	1	1	0	4
(Japan) Tori Koana	0	1	0	3	2	0	0	1	7

Sheet 8	1	2	3	4	5	6	7	8	Final
(Germany) Daniela Jentsch 🔨	0	1	0	1	0	0	0	3	5
(Saskatchewan) Amber Holland	0	0	1	0	0	1	1	0	3

=== Draw 3 ===
Thursday, October 17, 5:00 pm

Sheet 1	1	2	3	4	5	6	7	8	Final
(Saskatchewan) Sherry Anderson 🔨	2	2	2	0	1	X	X	X	7
(Ontario) Chrissy Cadorin	0	0	0	1	0	X	X	X	1

Sheet 2	1	2	3	4	5	6	7	8	Final
(Alberta) Kelsey Rocque	0	2	0	1	1	1	0	1	6
(Manitoba) Darcy Robertson 🔨	1	0	2	0	0	0	1	0	4

Sheet 3	1	2	3	4	5	6	7	8	Final
(Japan) Seina Nakajima	0	0	1	1	0	1	1	0	4
(Scotland) Eve Muirhead 🔨	1	1	0	0	3	0	0	1	6

Sheet 4	1	2	3	4	5	6	7	8	Final
(Switzerland) Silvana Tirinzoni 🔨	1	0	1	0	0	0	2	0	4
(United States) Jamie Sinclair	0	1	0	0	2	1	0	1	5

Sheet 5	1	2	3	4	5	6	7	8	Final
(Alberta) Laura Walker 🔨	2	0	1	2	0	2	X	X	7
(Manitoba) Kerri Einarson	0	1	0	0	1	0	X	X	2

Sheet 6	1	2	3	4	5	6	7	8	Final
(South Korea) Gim Un-chi 🔨	1	0	0	0	3	0	1	X	5
(Manitoba) Mackenzie Zacharias	0	2	2	1	0	2	0	X	7

Sheet 7	1	2	3	4	5	6	7	8	Final
(Ontario) Lauren Horton 🔨	0	2	3	1	2	X	X	X	8
(Japan) Sayaka Yoshimura	1	0	0	0	0	X	X	X	1

Sheet 8	1	2	3	4	5	6	7	8	Final
(Quebec) Laurie St-Georges	0	1	0	0	1	0	X	X	2
(South Korea) Kim Min-ji 🔨	2	0	1	2	0	1	X	X	6

=== Draw 4 ===
Thursday, October 17, 8:30 pm

Sheet 1	1	2	3	4	5	6	7	8	Final
(Manitoba) Abby Ackland 🔨	0	0	0	0	X	X	X	X	0
(United States) Nina Roth	3	1	2	2	X	X	X	X	8

Sheet 2	1	2	3	4	5	6	7	8	9	Final
(Manitoba) Tracy Fleury	1	0	0	0	0	0	1	2	0	4
(Germany) Daniela Jentsch 🔨	0	1	1	1	0	1	0	0	1	5

Sheet 3	1	2	3	4	5	6	7	8	Final
(Manitoba) Jennifer Jones	0	1	0	2	0	1	0	0	4
(Japan) Tori Koana 🔨	1	0	1	0	2	0	1	1	6

Sheet 4	1	2	3	4	5	6	7	8	Final
(Manitoba) Kristy Watling	0	0	1	0	0	1	X	X	2
(Saskatchewan) Amber Holland 🔨	0	2	0	2	3	0	X	X	7

Sheet 5	1	2	3	4	5	6	7	8	Final
(Ontario) Rachel Homan 🔨	0	2	0	1	1	1	X	X	5
(South Korea) Kim Eun-jung	0	0	1	0	0	0	X	X	1

Sheet 6	1	2	3	4	5	6	7	8	Final
(Northwest Territories) Kerry Galusha 🔨	0	0	1	1	1	0	2	X	5
(Manitoba) Jennifer Clark-Rouire	1	1	0	0	0	1	0	X	3

Sheet 7	1	2	3	4	5	6	7	8	Final
(Manitoba) Theresa Cannon	0	2	0	0	1	0	2	X	5
(Switzerland) Elena Stern 🔨	2	0	3	0	0	2	0	X	7

Sheet 8	1	2	3	4	5	6	7	8	Final
(Saskatchewan) Skylar Ackerman 🔨	1	0	0	4	0	3	1	X	9
(Manitoba) Beth Peterson	0	2	1	0	3	0	0	X	6

=== Draw 5 ===
Friday, October 18, 10:00 am

Sheet 1	1	2	3	4	5	6	7	8	Final
(South Korea) Kim Eun-jung	0	1	0	1	1	2	1	2	8
(Saskatchewan) Amber Holland 🔨	3	0	2	0	0	0	0	0	5

Sheet 2	1	2	3	4	5	6	7	8	Final
(Japan) Sayaka Yoshimura	2	0	2	0	1	0	0	1	6
(Saskatchewan) Sherry Anderson 🔨	0	1	0	1	0	3	3	0	8

Sheet 3	1	2	3	4	5	6	7	8	Final
(Manitoba) Theresa Cannon	0	3	0	0	2	0	1	0	6
(United States) Nina Roth 🔨	1	0	2	2	0	1	0	1	7

Sheet 4	1	2	3	4	5	6	7	8	Final
(Manitoba) Kerri Einarson 🔨	1	0	1	0	1	1	0	X	4
(South Korea) Kim Min-ji	0	1	0	1	0	0	1	X	3

Sheet 5	1	2	3	4	5	6	7	8	9	Final
(Manitoba) Tracy Fleury 🔨	2	0	0	2	0	1	0	0	1	6
(Saskatchewan) Skylar Ackerman	0	0	1	0	2	0	2	0	0	5

Sheet 6	1	2	3	4	5	6	7	8	Final
(Japan) Seina Nakajima	0	1	0	4	1	0	0	1	7
(Alberta) Kelsey Rocque 🔨	2	0	1	0	0	1	1	0	5

Sheet 7	1	2	3	4	5	6	7	8	Final
(Switzerland) Silvana Tirinzoni 🔨	1	0	1	0	1	0	1	2	6
(Manitoba) Mackenzie Zacharias	0	1	0	1	0	1	0	0	3

Sheet 8	1	2	3	4	5	6	7	8	Final
(Manitoba) Jennifer Jones	0	0	3	0	0	0	1	0	4
(Northwest Territories) Kerry Galusha 🔨	1	0	0	1	1	1	0	1	5

=== Draw 6 ===
Friday, October 18, 1:30 pm

Sheet 1	1	2	3	4	5	6	7	8	Final
(Switzerland) Elena Stern 🔨	0	0	2	0	1	0	X	X	3
(Ontario) Rachel Homan	1	3	0	2	0	2	X	X	8

Sheet 2	1	2	3	4	5	6	7	8	Final
(Manitoba) Kristy Watling 🔨	0	1	0	0	2	0	1	0	4
(Manitoba) Abby Ackland	0	0	2	1	0	2	0	1	6

Sheet 3	1	2	3	4	5	6	7	8	Final
(Manitoba) Jennifer Clark-Rouire	1	1	0	2	0	0	0	X	4
(Manitoba) Beth Peterson 🔨	0	0	5	0	1	2	2	X	10

Sheet 4	1	2	3	4	5	6	7	8	Final
(Ontario) Lauren Horton	0	1	0	1	0	1	0	X	3
(Alberta) Laura Walker 🔨	0	0	3	0	4	0	2	X	9

Sheet 5	1	2	3	4	5	6	7	8	Final
(Germany) Daniela Jentsch 🔨	1	0	3	1	0	1	2	X	8
(Japan) Tori Koana	0	2	0	0	2	0	0	X	4

Sheet 6	1	2	3	4	5	6	7	8	Final
(United States) Jamie Sinclair	0	0	1	0	3	0	0	X	4
(Scotland) Eve Muirhead 🔨	0	2	0	3	0	0	1	X	6

Sheet 7	1	2	3	4	5	6	7	8	Final
(Manitoba) Darcy Robertson	0	0	3	0	0	1	0	X	4
(South Korea) Gim Un-chi 🔨	2	1	0	2	1	0	1	X	7

Sheet 8	1	2	3	4	5	6	7	8	Final
(Quebec) Laurie St-Georges 🔨	2	0	1	2	0	3	X	X	8
(Ontario) Chrissy Cadorin	0	1	0	0	2	0	X	X	3

=== Draw 7 ===
Friday, October 18, 5:00 pm

Sheet 2	1	2	3	4	5	6	7	8	9	Final
(Saskatchewan) Amber Holland 🔨	2	0	2	0	0	0	2	0	0	6
(Manitoba) Theresa Cannon	0	1	0	1	1	1	0	2	1	7

Sheet 3	1	2	3	4	5	6	7	8	Final
(Manitoba) Kerri Einarson 🔨	1	0	1	1	3	0	X	X	6
(Saskatchewan) Sherry Anderson	0	1	0	0	0	1	X	X	2

Sheet 4	1	2	3	4	5	6	7	8	Final
(Manitoba) Jennifer Jones	0	2	0	2	2	0	2	X	8
(Saskatchewan) Skylar Ackerman 🔨	1	0	1	0	0	1	0	X	3

Sheet 5	1	2	3	4	5	6	7	8	Final
(Alberta) Kelsey Rocque 🔨	0	1	0	0	0	4	2	0	7
(Manitoba) Mackenzie Zacharias	0	0	4	1	1	0	0	2	8

Sheet 6	1	2	3	4	5	6	7	8	Final
(South Korea) Kim Eun-jung 🔨	2	2	2	1	X	X	X	X	7
(United States) Nina Roth	0	0	0	0	X	X	X	X	0

Sheet 7	1	2	3	4	5	6	7	8	9	Final
(South Korea) Kim Min-ji	0	0	0	1	0	0	2	1	1	5
(Japan) Sayaka Yoshimura 🔨	0	1	0	0	2	1	0	0	0	4

=== Draw 8 ===
Friday, October 18, 8:30 pm

Sheet 1	1	2	3	4	5	6	7	8	Final
(Switzerland) Silvana Tirinzoni	1	3	1	0	0	3	0	1	9
(Japan) Tori Koana 🔨	0	0	0	4	1	0	1	0	6

Sheet 2	1	2	3	4	5	6	7	8	Final
(United States) Nina Roth	0	0	2	0	0	2	3	0	7
(Manitoba) Mackenzie Zacharias 🔨	1	2	0	1	1	0	0	4	9

Sheet 3	1	2	3	4	5	6	7	8	Final
(Northwest Territories) Kerry Galusha 🔨	0	2	0	1	0	1	0	X	4
(Ontario) Lauren Horton	0	0	3	0	3	0	1	X	7

Sheet 4	1	2	3	4	5	6	7	8	Final
(Ontario) Rachel Homan	0	0	0	1	1	1	3	X	6
(Germany) Daniela Jentsch 🔨	0	2	2	0	0	0	0	X	4

Sheet 5	1	2	3	4	5	6	7	8	Final
(Japan) Seina Nakajima 🔨	1	0	3	0	0	2	0	X	6
(Switzerland) Elena Stern	0	1	0	3	3	0	2	X	9

Sheet 6	1	2	3	4	5	6	7	8	Final
(Saskatchewan) Sherry Anderson	1	0	3	1	1	0	2	X	8
(Manitoba) Abby Ackland 🔨	0	2	0	0	0	1	0	X	3

Sheet 7	1	2	3	4	5	6	7	8	9	Final
(Alberta) Laura Walker 🔨	0	3	0	2	0	0	0	3	1	9
(Scotland) Eve Muirhead	0	0	2	0	1	2	3	0	0	8

Sheet 8	1	2	3	4	5	6	7	8	Final
(Manitoba) Tracy Fleury 🔨	2	0	1	4	0	1	X	X	8
(United States) Jamie Sinclair	0	1	0	0	1	0	X	X	2

=== Draw 9 ===
Saturday, October 19, 10:00 am

Sheet 1	1	2	3	4	5	6	7	8	Final
(Northwest Territories) Kerry Galusha	1	0	1	2	0	0	0	X	4
(South Korea) Gim Un-chi 🔨	0	2	0	0	2	2	2	X	8

Sheet 2	1	2	3	4	5	6	7	8	Final
(Manitoba) Kerri Einarson 🔨	1	0	0	2	0	2	1	X	6
(Germany) Daniela Jentsch	0	0	1	0	1	0	0	X	2

Sheet 3	1	2	3	4	5	6	7	8	Final
(Switzerland) Elena Stern 🔨	1	0	1	0	0	1	0	3	6
(Switzerland) Silvana Tirinzoni	0	1	0	1	0	0	3	0	5

Sheet 4	1	2	3	4	5	6	7	8	Final
(South Korea) Kim Eun-jung	0	1	0	1	0	0	0	X	2
(Scotland) Eve Muirhead 🔨	1	0	2	0	1	1	1	X	6

Sheet 5	1	2	3	4	5	6	7	8	Final
(United States) Jamie Sinclair	0	0	0	3	0	5	X	X	8
(Quebec) Laurie St-Georges 🔨	0	1	0	0	1	0	X	X	2

Sheet 6	1	2	3	4	5	6	7	8	Final
(Ontario) Lauren Horton	0	1	0	1	0	2	1	0	5
(Manitoba) Tracy Fleury 🔨	1	0	2	0	2	0	0	2	7

Sheet 7	1	2	3	4	5	6	7	8	Final
(Japan) Seina Nakajima	0	0	3	0	1	0	0	1	5
(Manitoba) Jennifer Jones 🔨	0	1	0	1	0	1	1	0	4

Sheet 8	1	2	3	4	5	6	7	8	Final
(Japan) Tori Koana	0	1	0	2	0	0	X	X	3
(Manitoba) Beth Peterson 🔨	2	0	1	0	2	3	X	X	8

=== Draw 10 ===
Saturday, October 19, 1:30 pm

Sheet 2	1	2	3	4	5	6	7	8	Final
(South Korea) Kim Min-ji	0	0	1	0	2	0	1	0	4
(Switzerland) Silvana Tirinzoni 🔨	1	1	0	1	0	1	0	1	5

Sheet 4	1	2	3	4	5	6	7	8	Final
(Manitoba) Mackenzie Zacharias	2	0	2	2	1	X	X	X	7
(Ontario) Lauren Horton 🔨	0	0	0	0	0	X	X	X	0

Sheet 5	1	2	3	4	5	6	7	8	Final
(Japan) Seina Nakajima	0	1	0	2	0	0	2	0	5
(South Korea) Kim Eun-jung 🔨	1	0	2	0	0	2	0	1	6

Sheet 6	1	2	3	4	5	6	7	8	Final
(Manitoba) Theresa Cannon	0	0	0	0	X	X	X	X	0
(Germany) Daniela Jentsch 🔨	2	2	1	2	X	X	X	X	7

=== Draw 11 ===
Saturday, October 19, 5:00 pm

Sheet 3	1	2	3	4	5	6	7	8	Final
(Manitoba) Beth Peterson 🔨	1	1	0	1	0	1	0	1	5
(Saskatchewan) Sherry Anderson	0	0	2	0	1	0	1	0	4

Sheet 4	1	2	3	4	5	6	7	8	Final
(Switzerland) Elena Stern	0	0	1	0	1	0	2	0	4
(Manitoba) Kerri Einarson 🔨	2	1	0	1	0	1	0	1	6

Sheet 5	1	2	3	4	5	6	7	8	Final
(Manitoba) Tracy Fleury	0	1	0	0	X	X	X	X	1
(Scotland) Eve Muirhead 🔨	1	0	2	4	X	X	X	X	7

Sheet 6	1	2	3	4	5	6	7	8	Final
(South Korea) Gim Un-chi 🔨	0	1	0	1	0	1	0	X	3
(United States) Jamie Sinclair	1	0	2	0	2	0	2	X	7

=== Draw 12 ===
Saturday, October 19, 8:30 pm

Sheet 3	1	2	3	4	5	6	7	8	Final
(United States) Jamie Sinclair	0	1	0	1	0	0	0	X	2
(Switzerland) Elena Stern 🔨	2	0	1	0	2	1	1	X	7

Sheet 4	1	2	3	4	5	6	7	8	Final
(South Korea) Kim Eun-jung	0	1	1	1	0	0	2	X	5
(Germany) Daniela Jentsch 🔨	1	0	0	0	1	1	0	X	3

Sheet 5	1	2	3	4	5	6	7	8	Final
(Switzerland) Silvana Tirinzoni	0	0	0	1	1	0	0	1	3
(Manitoba) Mackenzie Zacharias 🔨	0	1	0	0	0	1	0	0	2

Sheet 6	1	2	3	4	5	6	7	8	Final
(Manitoba) Beth Peterson	0	0	0	1	0	X	X	X	1
(Manitoba) Tracy Fleury 🔨	2	1	1	0	6	X	X	X	10

== Playoffs ==
Quarterfinals
A1	(Alberta) Laura Walker	5
C2	(Switzerland) Silvana Tirinzoni	8
B2	(Scotland) Eve Muirhead	6
C1	(Switzerland) Elena Stern	8
A2	(Ontario) Rachel Homan	7
C3	(South Korea) Kim Eun-jung	3
B1	(Manitoba) Kerri Einarson	8
C4	(Manitoba) Tracy Fleury	3

Semifinals
C2	(Switzerland) Silvana Tirinzoni	3
C1	(Switzerland) Elena Stern	5
A2	(Ontario) Rachel Homan	6
B1	(Manitoba) Kerri Einarson	5

Final
C1	(Switzerland) Elena Stern	7
A2	(Ontario) Rachel Homan	6

=== Quarterfinals ===
Sunday, October 20, 10:00 am

Sheet 2	1	2	3	4	5	6	7	8	Final
(Scotland) Eve Muirhead 🔨	2	0	2	0	0	0	2	0	6
(Switzerland) Elena Stern	0	3	0	1	2	1	0	1	8

Sheet 3	1	2	3	4	5	6	7	8	Final
(Manitoba) Kerri Einarson 🔨	2	0	2	1	0	0	3	X	8
(Manitoba) Tracy Fleury	0	1	0	0	2	0	0	X	3

Sheet 5	1	2	3	4	5	6	7	8	Final
(Ontario) Rachel Homan 🔨	0	2	1	0	1	0	3	X	7
(South Korea) Kim Eun-jung	0	0	0	1	0	2	0	X	3

Sheet 6	1	2	3	4	5	6	7	8	Final
(Alberta) Laura Walker 🔨	0	0	2	0	2	0	1	0	5
(Switzerland) Silvana Tirinzoni	0	1	0	2	0	1	0	4	8

=== Semifinals ===
Sunday, October 20, 2:00 pm

Sheet 3	1	2	3	4	5	6	7	8	Final
(Switzerland) Silvana Tirinzoni 🔨	0	0	0	0	2	0	1	0	3
(Switzerland) Elena Stern	0	1	1	0	0	2	0	1	5

Sheet 6	1	2	3	4	5	6	7	8	9	Final
(Ontario) Rachel Homan 🔨	2	0	0	0	0	3	0	0	1	6
(Manitoba) Kerri Einarson	0	0	1	0	1	0	2	1	0	5

=== Final ===
Sunday, October 20, 6:00 pm

Sheet 4	1	2	3	4	5	6	7	8	9	Final
(Switzerland) Elena Stern	0	0	2	0	0	2	0	2	1	7
(Ontario) Rachel Homan 🔨	0	3	0	1	0	0	2	0	0	6
