= 2021 Players' Championship =

Grand Slam of Curling event

- Host city: Calgary, Alberta
- Arena: Markin MacPhail Centre, Canada Olympic Park
- Dates: April 20–25, 2021
- Men's winner: (Scotland) Team Mouat
- Curling club: Gogar Park CC, Edinburgh
- Skip: Bruce Mouat
- Third: Grant Hardie
- Second: Bobby Lammie
- Lead: Hammy McMillan Jr.
- Coach: Alan Hannah
- Finalist: (Newfoundland and Labrador) Brad Gushue
- Women's winner: (Manitoba) Team Einarson
- Curling club: Gimli CC, Gimli
- Skip: Kerri Einarson
- Third: Val Sweeting
- Second: Shannon Birchard
- Lead: Briane Meilleur
- Coach: Heather Nedohin
- Finalist: (Ontario) Rachel Homan

The 2021 Princess Auto Players' Championship was held April 20–25, 2021 at the Markin MacPhail Centre at Canada Olympic Park in Calgary, Alberta.

Due to the COVID-19 pandemic in Canada, it was announced that both the Players' Championship and the Champions Cup Grand Slam of Curling events would still be held in the 2020–21 curling season but would move to a centralized "bubble" (similar to that of the NHL as in Edmonton) at Canada Olympic Park alongside Curling Canada's national championships. All events will be held behind closed doors with no spectators.

In the men's final, Team Bruce Mouat of Scotland won their second consecutive slam in the bubble, defeating Team Brad Gushue of St. John's 6–5. Team Mouat won the 2021 Champions Cup just six days prior to their win at the Players' Championship.

In the women's final, Team Kerri Einarson of Gimli topped Team Rachel Homan of Ottawa 5–2 to win their second consecutive Players' Championship title.

== Qualification ==
The top 12 ranked men's and women's teams on the World Curling Federation's world team rankings qualified for the event. In the event that a team declines their invitation, the next-ranked team on the world team ranking is invited until the field is complete.

=== Men ===
Top world team ranking men's teams:

1. (Ontario) Brad Jacobs
2. (Ontario) John Epping
3. (Newfoundland and Labrador) Brad Gushue
4. (Alberta) Brendan Bottcher
5. (Scotland) Bruce Mouat
6. (Switzerland) Yannick Schwaller
7. (Manitoba) Mike McEwen
8. (Sweden) Niklas Edin
9. (Switzerland) Peter de Cruz
10. (Alberta) Kevin Koe
11. (Saskatchewan) Matt Dunstone
12. (Scotland) ~~Ross Paterson~~
13. (Manitoba) Jason Gunnlaugson

=== Women ===
Top world team ranking women's teams:

1. (Sweden) Anna Hasselborg
2. (Manitoba) Kerri Einarson
3. (Manitoba) Tracy Fleury
4. (Japan) Satsuki Fujisawa
5. (Manitoba) Jennifer Jones
6. (Switzerland) Elena Stern
7. (Switzerland) Silvana Tirinzoni
8. (Ontario) Rachel Homan
9. (Scotland) Eve Muirhead
10. (United States) Tabitha Peterson
11. (South Korea) Kim Min-ji
12. (Russia) Alina Kovaleva

== Men ==
=== Teams ===
The teams are listed as follows:

Skip	Third	Second	Lead	Locale
Brendan Bottcher	Darren Moulding	Brad Thiessen	Karrick Martin	Edmonton, Alberta
Benoît Schwarz (Fourth)	Sven Michel	Peter de Cruz (Skip)	Valentin Tanner	Geneva, Switzerland
Matt Dunstone	Braeden Moskowy	Kirk Muyres	Dustin Kidby	Wadena, Saskatchewan
Niklas Edin	Oskar Eriksson	Rasmus Wranå	Christoffer Sundgren	Karlstad, Sweden
John Epping	Colton Lott (Note: Colton Lott is playing third on Team Epping as Ryan Fry is staying home due to family commitments.)	Mat Camm	Brent Laing	Toronto, Ontario
Jason Gunnlaugson	Adam Casey	Matt Wozniak	Connor Njegovan	Morris, Manitoba
Brad Gushue	Mark Nichols	Brett Gallant	Geoff Walker	St. John's, Newfoundland and Labrador
Brad Jacobs	Marc Kennedy	E. J. Harnden	Ryan Harnden	Sault Ste. Marie, Ontario
Kevin Koe	John Morris	B. J. Neufeld	Ben Hebert	Calgary, Alberta
Reid Carruthers	Tyler Tardi (Note: Tyler Tardi is playing third and Carruthers is skipping Team McEwen as Mike McEwen is staying home due to family commitments.)	Derek Samagalski	– (Note: Team McEwen is playing with three players this week, with their lead Colin Hodgson staying home due to the COVID-19 pandemic.)	Winnipeg, Manitoba
Bruce Mouat	Grant Hardie	Bobby Lammie	Hammy McMillan Jr.	Edinburgh, Scotland
Yannick Schwaller	Michael Brunner	Romano Meier	Marcel Käufeler	Bern, Switzerland

=== Round-robin standings ===
Final round-robin standings

Key
Teams to Playoffs
Teams to Tiebreakers

Pool A	W	L	PF	PA
(Scotland) Bruce Mouat	5	0	34	16
(Ontario) Brad Jacobs	3	2	29	24
(Sweden) Niklas Edin	2	3	24	27
(Manitoba) Jason Gunnlaugson	2	3	27	35
(Switzerland) Peter de Cruz	2	3	26	27
(Alberta) Brendan Bottcher	1	4	25	36

Pool B	W	L	PF	PA
(Manitoba) Team McEwen	4	1	24	19
(Newfoundland and Labrador) Brad Gushue	4	1	26	22
(Saskatchewan) Matt Dunstone	4	1	32	18
(Switzerland) Yannick Schwaller	2	3	22	28
(Alberta) Kevin Koe	1	4	25	26
(Ontario) John Epping	0	5	15	31

=== Round-robin results ===
All draw times are listed in Mountain Daylight Time (UTC−06:00).

==== Draw 1 ====
Tuesday, April 20, 1:00 pm

Sheet A	1	2	3	4	5	6	7	8	Final
(Switzerland) Peter de Cruz	0	0	0	2	0	2	0	X	4
(Sweden) Niklas Edin 🔨	0	2	3	0	2	0	2	X	9

Sheet C	1	2	3	4	5	6	7	8	Final
(Manitoba) Jason Gunnlaugson 🔨	0	1	0	2	1	0	2	0	6
(Ontario) Brad Jacobs	2	0	1	0	0	2	0	3	8

==== Draw 2 ====
Tuesday, April 20, 4:30 pm

Sheet A	1	2	3	4	5	6	7	8	Final
(Newfoundland and Labrador) Brad Gushue 🔨	2	0	0	0	4	0	1	X	7
(Manitoba) Team McEwen	0	1	1	0	0	1	0	X	3

Sheet D	1	2	3	4	5	6	7	8	Final
(Alberta) Brendan Bottcher	0	3	0	0	0	2	1	0	6
(Scotland) Bruce Mouat 🔨	0	0	1	1	2	0	0	5	9

==== Draw 3 ====
Tuesday, April 20, 8:00 pm

Sheet C	1	2	3	4	5	6	7	8	Final
(Switzerland) Yannick Schwaller 🔨	3	1	0	0	2	0	0	X	6
(Ontario) John Epping	0	0	1	0	0	2	1	X	4

Sheet D	1	2	3	4	5	6	7	8	Final
(Saskatchewan) Matt Dunstone 🔨	0	0	3	0	1	0	2	0	6
(Alberta) Kevin Koe	0	0	0	1	0	3	0	1	5

==== Draw 4 ====
Wednesday, April 21, 8:00 am

Sheet A	1	2	3	4	5	6	7	8	9	Final
(Manitoba) Jason Gunnlaugson 🔨	3	0	0	4	0	1	0	0	1	9
(Alberta) Brendan Bottcher	0	1	1	0	2	0	3	1	0	8

Sheet B	1	2	3	4	5	6	7	8	Final
(Scotland) Bruce Mouat 🔨	0	3	1	0	3	X	X	X	7
(Sweden) Niklas Edin	0	0	0	2	0	X	X	X	2

Sheet D	1	2	3	4	5	6	7	8	Final
(Ontario) Brad Jacobs	0	0	2	0	0	2	0	X	4
(Switzerland) Peter de Cruz 🔨	3	2	0	2	0	0	1	X	8

==== Draw 6 ====
Wednesday, April 21, 4:00 pm

Sheet A	1	2	3	4	5	6	7	8	9	Final
(Switzerland) Yannick Schwaller 🔨	0	1	0	0	1	0	2	0	1	5
(Alberta) Kevin Koe	0	0	0	1	0	2	0	1	0	4

Sheet B	1	2	3	4	5	6	7	8	Final
(Ontario) John Epping	0	0	1	0	0	0	2	0	3
(Newfoundland and Labrador) Brad Gushue 🔨	0	3	0	0	0	2	0	1	6

Sheet C	1	2	3	4	5	6	7	8	Final
(Saskatchewan) Matt Dunstone	0	0	0	2	1	0	0	0	3
(Manitoba) Team McEwen 🔨	1	0	1	0	0	1	1	1	5

==== Draw 7 ====
Wednesday, April 21, 8:00 pm

Sheet A	1	2	3	4	5	6	7	8	Final
(Ontario) Brad Jacobs 🔨	0	2	0	0	2	0	0	X	4
(Scotland) Bruce Mouat	0	0	0	2	0	2	2	X	6

Sheet B	1	2	3	4	5	6	7	8	Final
(Manitoba) Jason Gunnlaugson	0	0	0	0	1	X	X	X	1
(Switzerland) Peter de Cruz 🔨	0	6	1	0	0	X	X	X	7

Sheet C	1	2	3	4	5	6	7	8	Final
(Alberta) Brendan Bottcher	0	1	0	0	0	0	1	X	2
(Sweden) Niklas Edin 🔨	0	0	2	1	1	1	0	X	5

==== Draw 8 ====
Thursday, April 22, 8:00 am

Sheet B	1	2	3	4	5	6	7	8	Final
(Manitoba) Team McEwen 🔨	1	0	0	2	0	2	0	1	6
(Alberta) Kevin Koe	0	0	1	0	3	0	1	0	5

==== Draw 9 ====
Thursday, April 22, 12:00 pm

Sheet B	1	2	3	4	5	6	7	8	Final
(Ontario) Brad Jacobs 🔨	0	0	0	1	0	2	0	3	6
(Sweden) Niklas Edin	0	0	0	0	2	0	0	0	2

==== Draw 10 ====
Thursday, April 22, 4:00 pm

Sheet A	1	2	3	4	5	6	7	8	Final
(Switzerland) Yannick Schwaller	0	0	1	0	1	0	0	X	2
(Manitoba) Team McEwen 🔨	2	2	0	1	0	0	1	X	6

Sheet B	1	2	3	4	5	6	7	8	Final
(Saskatchewan) Matt Dunstone 🔨	0	3	0	0	2	2	X	X	7
(Newfoundland and Labrador) Brad Gushue	0	0	2	0	0	0	X	X	2

Sheet C	1	2	3	4	5	6	7	8	Final
(Manitoba) Jason Gunnlaugson	1	1	0	0	1	0	0	X	3
(Scotland) Bruce Mouat 🔨	0	0	3	0	0	1	2	X	6

Sheet D	1	2	3	4	5	6	7	8	Final
(Ontario) John Epping	0	2	0	0	0	2	0	X	4
(Alberta) Kevin Koe 🔨	2	0	1	1	1	0	2	X	7

==== Draw 11 ====
Thursday, April 22, 8:00 pm

Sheet B	1	2	3	4	5	6	7	8	9	Final
(Alberta) Brendan Bottcher	0	3	0	0	1	0	2	0	1	7
(Switzerland) Peter de Cruz 🔨	2	0	0	1	0	2	0	1	0	6

==== Draw 12 ====
Friday, April 23, 8:00 am

Sheet C	1	2	3	4	5	6	7	8	Final
(Ontario) John Epping 🔨	0	0	0	2	0	X	X	X	2
(Saskatchewan) Matt Dunstone	1	1	2	0	4	X	X	X	8

Sheet D	1	2	3	4	5	6	7	8	Final
(Switzerland) Yannick Schwaller 🔨	0	2	0	0	2	0	1	0	5
(Newfoundland and Labrador) Brad Gushue	1	0	1	2	0	1	0	1	6

==== Draw 13 ====
Friday, April 23, 12:00 pm

Sheet C	1	2	3	4	5	6	7	8	Final
(Alberta) Brendan Bottcher	0	0	0	0	2	0	X	X	2
(Ontario) Brad Jacobs 🔨	0	1	1	2	0	3	X	X	7

Sheet D	1	2	3	4	5	6	7	8	Final
(Manitoba) Jason Gunnlaugson 🔨	2	0	2	0	2	1	0	1	8
(Sweden) Niklas Edin	0	3	0	1	0	0	2	0	6

==== Draw 15 ====
Friday, April 23, 8:00 pm

Sheet A	1	2	3	4	5	6	7	8	Final
(Switzerland) Peter de Cruz	0	1	0	0	0	0	X	X	1
(Scotland) Bruce Mouat 🔨	2	0	0	1	1	2	X	X	6

Sheet B	1	2	3	4	5	6	7	8	Final
(Switzerland) Yannick Schwaller	0	2	0	0	2	0	X	X	4
(Saskatchewan) Matt Dunstone 🔨	4	0	1	2	0	1	X	X	8

Sheet C	1	2	3	4	5	6	7	8	Final
(Newfoundland and Labrador) Brad Gushue	0	1	1	1	0	1	0	1	5
(Alberta) Kevin Koe 🔨	1	0	0	0	2	0	1	0	4

Sheet D	1	2	3	4	5	6	7	8	Final
(Ontario) John Epping	0	0	2	0	0	0	0	X	2
(Manitoba) Team McEwen 🔨	1	1	0	0	0	2	0	X	4

=== Tiebreaker ===
Saturday, April 24, 12:00 pm

Sheet C	1	2	3	4	5	6	7	8	Final
(Sweden) Niklas Edin 🔨	0	2	0	2	0	1	0	X	5
(Manitoba) Jason Gunnlaugson	0	0	1	0	1	0	0	X	2

Player percentages
(Sweden) Team Edin		(Manitoba) Team Gunnlaugson	
Christoffer Sundgren	92%	Connor Njegovan	89%
Rasmus Wranå	89%	Matt Wozniak	78%
Oskar Eriksson	83%	Adam Casey	73%
Niklas Edin	98%	Jason Gunnlaugson	77%
Total	90%	Total	79%

=== Playoffs ===
Quarterfinals
4	(Saskatchewan) Matt Dunstone	4
5	(Ontario) Brad Jacobs	5
3	(Newfoundland and Labrador) Brad Gushue	6
6	(Sweden) Niklas Edin	2

Semifinals
1	(Scotland) Bruce Mouat	6
5	(Ontario) Brad Jacobs	5
2	(Manitoba) Team McEwen	5
3	(Newfoundland and Labrador) Brad Gushue	6

Final
1	(Scotland) Bruce Mouat	6
3	(Newfoundland and Labrador) Brad Gushue	5

==== Quarterfinals ====
Saturday, April 24, 4:00 pm

Sheet A	1	2	3	4	5	6	7	8	Final
(Newfoundland and Labrador) Brad Gushue 🔨	1	0	1	1	0	3	X	X	6
(Sweden) Niklas Edin	0	1	0	0	1	0	X	X	2

Player percentages
(Newfoundland and Labrador) Team Gushue		(Sweden) Team Edin	
Geoff Walker	96%	Christoffer Sundgren	100%
Brett Gallant	69%	Rasmus Wranå	71%
Mark Nichols	100%	Oskar Eriksson	77%
Brad Gushue	90%	Niklas Edin	71%
Total	89%	Total	80%

Sheet B	1	2	3	4	5	6	7	8	9	Final
(Saskatchewan) Matt Dunstone 🔨	0	2	0	0	1	0	0	1	0	4
(Ontario) Brad Jacobs	0	0	1	1	0	2	0	0	1	5

Player percentages
(Saskatchewan) Team Dunstone		(Ontario) Team Jacobs	
Dustin Kidby	92%	Ryan Harnden	92%
Kirk Muyres	69%	E. J. Harnden	85%
Braeden Moskowy	85%	Marc Kennedy	86%
Matt Dunstone	79%	Brad Jacobs	83%
Total	81%	Total	86%

==== Semifinals ====
Saturday, April 24, 8:00 pm

Sheet C	1	2	3	4	5	6	7	8	Final
(Scotland) Bruce Mouat 🔨	0	1	0	1	0	2	0	2	6
(Ontario) Brad Jacobs	0	0	1	0	2	0	2	0	5

Player percentages
(Scotland) Team Mouat		(Ontario) Team Jacobs	
Hammy McMillan Jr.	89%	Ryan Harnden	100%
Bobby Lammie	86%	E. J. Harnden	88%
Grant Hardie	88%	Marc Kennedy	89%
Bruce Mouat	94%	Brad Jacobs	92%
Total	89%	Total	92%

Sheet D	1	2	3	4	5	6	7	8	9	Final
(Manitoba) Team McEwen	0	1	0	0	1	1	0	2	0	5
(Newfoundland and Labrador) Brad Gushue 🔨	3	0	0	1	0	0	1	0	1	6

Player percentages
(Manitoba) Team McEwen		(Newfoundland and Labrador) Team Gushue	
Derek Samagalski	93%	Geoff Walker	93%
Derek Samagalski / Tyler Tardi	68%	Brett Gallant	90%
Tyler Tardi	90%	Mark Nichols	93%
Reid Carruthers	81%	Brad Gushue	83%
Total	83%	Total	90%

==== Final ====
Sunday, April 25, 2:00 pm

Sheet C	1	2	3	4	5	6	7	8	Final
(Scotland) Bruce Mouat 🔨	2	0	0	2	0	0	0	2	6
(Newfoundland and Labrador) Brad Gushue	0	2	1	0	1	0	1	0	5

Player percentages
(Scotland) Team Mouat		(Newfoundland and Labrador) Team Gushue	
Hammy McMillan Jr.	95%	Geoff Walker	97%
Bobby Lammie	88%	Brett Gallant	77%
Grant Hardie	95%	Mark Nichols	80%
Bruce Mouat	84%	Brad Gushue	83%
Total	91%	Total	84%

== Women ==
=== Teams ===
The teams are listed as follows:

Skip	Third	Second	Lead	Alternate	Locale
Kerri Einarson	Val Sweeting	Shannon Birchard	Briane Meilleur		Gimli, Manitoba
Chelsea Carey (Note: Chelsea Carey is skipping Team Fleury as Tracy Fleury is staying home due to family commitments.)	Selena Njegovan	Liz Fyfe	Kristin MacCuish		East St. Paul, Manitoba
Satsuki Fujisawa	Chinami Yoshida	Yumi Suzuki	– (Note: Team Fujisawa played with three players as their lead Yurika Yoshida needed to return home to Japan to quarantine in time for the 2021 World Mixed Doubles Curling Championship.)		Kitami, Japan
Anna Hasselborg	Sara McManus	Agnes Knochenhauer	Sofia Mabergs		Sundbyberg, Sweden
Rachel Homan	Emma Miskew	Sarah Wilkes	Joanne Courtney	Laura Walker (Note: After originally announcing that Laura Walker would spare as third for Team Homan as Rachel Homan was expecting her second child, Homan returned to the team in time for the event, shifting Walker to alternate.)	Ottawa, Ontario
Jennifer Jones	Kaitlyn Lawes	Jocelyn Peterman	Lisa Weagle		Winnipeg, Manitoba
Kim Min-ji	Ha Seung-youn	Kim Hye-rin	Kim Su-jin	Yang Tae-i	Chuncheon, South Korea
Alina Kovaleva	Yulia Portunova (Note: Yulia Portunova is replacing Maria Komarova on Team Kovaleva, who is skipping the team at the Russian Curling Championships.)	Galina Arsenkina	Ekaterina Kuzmina		Saint Petersburg, Russia
Eve Muirhead	Vicky Wright	Jennifer Dodds	Lauren Gray		Stirling, Scotland
Tabitha Peterson	Nina Roth	Becca Hamilton	Tara Peterson	Aileen Geving	Chaska, United States
Briar Hürlimann (Fourth)	Elena Stern (Skip)	Lisa Gisler	Céline Koller		Brig, Switzerland
Alina Pätz (Fourth)	Silvana Tirinzoni (Skip)	Esther Neuenschwander	Melanie Barbezat		Aarau, Switzerland

=== Round-robin standings ===
Final round-robin standings

Key
Teams to Playoffs

Pool A	W	L	PF	PA
(Switzerland) Silvana Tirinzoni	4	1	32	20
(Manitoba) Kerri Einarson	4	1	30	20
(Switzerland) Elena Stern	3	2	23	22
(Manitoba) Team Fleury	2	3	21	27
(South Korea) Kim Min-ji	2	3	24	26
(United States) Tabitha Peterson	0	5	21	36

Pool B	W	L	PF	PA
(Sweden) Anna Hasselborg	4	1	33	20
(Ontario) Rachel Homan	3	2	27	26
(Japan) Satsuki Fujisawa	3	2	32	24
(Manitoba) Jennifer Jones	2	3	24	28
(Russia) Alina Kovaleva	2	3	26	30
(Scotland) Eve Muirhead	1	4	21	35

=== Round-robin results ===
All draw times are listed in Mountain Daylight Time (UTC−06:00).

==== Draw 1 ====
Tuesday, April 20, 1:00 pm

Sheet B	1	2	3	4	5	6	7	8	Final
(Manitoba) Team Fleury	0	0	2	1	0	X	X	X	3
(South Korea) Kim Min-ji 🔨	0	3	0	0	6	X	X	X	9

Sheet D	1	2	3	4	5	6	7	8	Final
(Russia) Alina Kovaleva	0	2	1	0	3	0	1	X	7
(Ontario) Rachel Homan 🔨	1	0	0	2	0	1	0	X	4

==== Draw 2 ====
Tuesday, April 20, 4:30 pm

Sheet B	1	2	3	4	5	6	7	8	Final
(Switzerland) Silvana Tirinzoni 🔨	0	2	1	0	1	1	0	X	5
(Switzerland) Elena Stern	0	0	0	1	0	0	1	X	2

Sheet C	1	2	3	4	5	6	7	8	Final
(Scotland) Eve Muirhead 🔨	1	0	1	0	2	0	1	0	5
(Manitoba) Jennifer Jones	0	2	0	2	0	1	0	1	6

==== Draw 3 ====
Tuesday, April 20, 8:00 pm

Sheet A	1	2	3	4	5	6	7	8	Final
(Manitoba) Kerri Einarson	0	1	0	3	2	0	0	1	7
(United States) Tabitha Peterson 🔨	2	0	3	0	0	1	0	0	6

Sheet B	1	2	3	4	5	6	7	8	Final
(Sweden) Anna Hasselborg	2	0	1	0	0	0	2	1	6
(Japan) Satsuki Fujisawa 🔨	0	1	0	0	1	1	0	0	3

==== Draw 4 ====
Wednesday, April 21, 8:00 am

Sheet C	1	2	3	4	5	6	7	8	Final
(Manitoba) Team Fleury 🔨	0	0	1	0	1	0	0	X	2
(Switzerland) Elena Stern	2	1	0	1	0	2	1	X	7

==== Draw 5 ====
Wednesday, April 21, 12:00 pm

Sheet A	1	2	3	4	5	6	7	8	Final
(Japan) Satsuki Fujisawa 🔨	2	2	0	4	0	0	3	X	11
(Scotland) Eve Muirhead	0	0	3	0	1	1	0	X	5

Sheet B	1	2	3	4	5	6	7	8	Final
(Russia) Alina Kovaleva 🔨	0	1	0	2	1	0	1	X	5
(Manitoba) Jennifer Jones	1	0	1	0	0	1	0	X	3

Sheet C	1	2	3	4	5	6	7	8	Final
(United States) Tabitha Peterson	1	0	0	1	0	2	0	0	4
(South Korea) Kim Min-ji 🔨	0	1	2	0	2	0	1	1	7

Sheet D	1	2	3	4	5	6	7	8	Final
(Sweden) Anna Hasselborg 🔨	3	0	0	0	1	0	0	0	4
(Ontario) Rachel Homan	0	2	0	1	0	2	0	2	7

==== Draw 6 ====
Wednesday, April 21, 4:00 pm

Sheet D	1	2	3	4	5	6	7	8	Final
(Switzerland) Silvana Tirinzoni	0	0	1	0	0	X	X	X	1
(Manitoba) Team Fleury 🔨	2	1	0	2	3	X	X	X	8

==== Draw 7 ====
Wednesday, April 21, 8:00 pm

Sheet D	1	2	3	4	5	6	7	8	Final
(Manitoba) Kerri Einarson 🔨	1	0	1	1	5	0	X	X	8
(Switzerland) Elena Stern	0	1	0	0	0	1	X	X	2

==== Draw 8 ====
Thursday, April 22, 8:00 am

Sheet A	1	2	3	4	5	6	7	8	Final
(Manitoba) Jennifer Jones	1	0	5	0	2	0	X	X	8
(Ontario) Rachel Homan 🔨	0	1	0	2	0	1	X	X	4

Sheet C	1	2	3	4	5	6	7	8	Final
(Japan) Satsuki Fujisawa	1	0	2	0	0	2	1	1	7
(Russia) Alina Kovaleva 🔨	0	2	0	2	0	0	0	0	4

Sheet D	1	2	3	4	5	6	7	8	Final
(Sweden) Anna Hasselborg 🔨	0	2	1	2	0	2	X	X	7
(Scotland) Eve Muirhead	0	0	0	0	1	0	X	X	1

==== Draw 9 ====
Thursday, April 22, 12:00 pm

Sheet A	1	2	3	4	5	6	7	8	Final
(Switzerland) Elena Stern 🔨	0	1	0	0	1	0	0	5	7
(South Korea) Kim Min-ji	0	0	2	0	0	1	0	0	3

Sheet C	1	2	3	4	5	6	7	8	Final
(Manitoba) Kerri Einarson	0	0	0	3	0	0	X	X	3
(Switzerland) Silvana Tirinzoni 🔨	3	2	2	0	1	2	X	X	10

Sheet D	1	2	3	4	5	6	7	8	Final
(United States) Tabitha Peterson 🔨	2	0	1	0	0	1	0	0	4
(Manitoba) Team Fleury	0	2	0	2	0	0	2	1	7

==== Draw 11 ====
Thursday, April 22, 8:00 pm

Sheet A	1	2	3	4	5	6	7	8	Final
(Sweden) Anna Hasselborg 🔨	3	0	1	0	3	1	0	1	9
(Russia) Alina Kovaleva	0	2	0	3	0	0	1	0	6

Sheet C	1	2	3	4	5	6	7	8	Final
(Scotland) Eve Muirhead	0	2	0	0	0	1	0	X	3
(Ontario) Rachel Homan 🔨	1	0	0	3	0	0	3	X	7

Sheet D	1	2	3	4	5	6	7	8	Final
(Japan) Satsuki Fujisawa	0	2	0	3	0	2	0	X	7
(Manitoba) Jennifer Jones 🔨	1	0	1	0	1	0	1	X	4

==== Draw 12 ====
Friday, April 23, 8:00 am

Sheet A	1	2	3	4	5	6	7	8	Final
(Switzerland) Silvana Tirinzoni 🔨	3	0	2	2	0	0	3	X	10
(United States) Tabitha Peterson	0	1	0	0	0	2	0	X	3

Sheet B	1	2	3	4	5	6	7	8	Final
(Manitoba) Kerri Einarson 🔨	3	0	1	1	1	0	X	X	6
(South Korea) Kim Min-ji	0	1	0	0	0	0	X	X	1

==== Draw 13 ====
Friday, April 23, 12:00 pm

Sheet A	1	2	3	4	5	6	7	8	9	Final
(Japan) Satsuki Fujisawa	0	1	0	2	0	0	0	1	0	4
(Ontario) Rachel Homan 🔨	2	0	1	0	0	1	0	0	1	5

Sheet B	1	2	3	4	5	6	7	8	Final
(Scotland) Eve Muirhead 🔨	0	2	0	0	2	0	1	2	7
(Russia) Alina Kovaleva	1	0	1	1	0	1	0	0	4

==== Draw 14 ====
Friday, April 23, 4:00 pm

Sheet A	1	2	3	4	5	6	7	8	Final
(Manitoba) Kerri Einarson 🔨	1	0	3	0	1	1	X	X	6
(Manitoba) Team Fleury	0	1	0	0	0	0	X	X	1

Sheet B	1	2	3	4	5	6	7	8	Final
(United States) Tabitha Peterson 🔨	1	0	0	2	0	0	1	0	4
(Switzerland) Elena Stern	0	1	2	0	0	1	0	1	5

Sheet C	1	2	3	4	5	6	7	8	Final
(Sweden) Anna Hasselborg 🔨	0	2	0	2	0	0	3	X	7
(Manitoba) Jennifer Jones	0	0	2	0	1	0	0	X	3

Sheet D	1	2	3	4	5	6	7	8	Final
(Switzerland) Silvana Tirinzoni	0	3	0	0	1	1	0	1	6
(South Korea) Kim Min-ji 🔨	1	0	1	1	0	0	1	0	4

=== Playoffs ===
Quarterfinals
4	(Ontario) Rachel Homan	4
5	(Switzerland) Elena Stern	3
3	(Sweden) Anna Hasselborg	7
6	(Japan) Satsuki Fujisawa	6

Semifinals
1	(Switzerland) Silvana Tirinzoni	3
4	(Ontario) Rachel Homan	5
2	(Manitoba) Kerri Einarson	5
3	(Sweden) Anna Hasselborg	4

Final
4	(Ontario) Rachel Homan	2
2	(Manitoba) Kerri Einarson	5

==== Quarterfinals ====
Saturday, April 24, 4:00 pm

Sheet C	1	2	3	4	5	6	7	8	Final
(Ontario) Rachel Homan 🔨	1	0	0	1	0	1	0	1	4
(Switzerland) Elena Stern	0	0	1	0	0	0	2	0	3

Player percentages
(Ontario) Team Homan		(Switzerland) Team Stern	
Joanne Courtney	84%	Céline Koller	92%
Sarah Wilkes	89%	Lisa Gisler	91%
Emma Miskew	84%	Elena Stern	89%
Rachel Homan	87%	Briar Hürlimann	92%
Total	86%	Total	91%

Sheet D	1	2	3	4	5	6	7	8	9	Final
(Sweden) Anna Hasselborg 🔨	1	0	3	0	1	0	1	0	1	7
(Japan) Satsuki Fujisawa	0	1	0	2	0	1	0	2	0	6

Player percentages
(Sweden) Team Hasselborg		(Japan) Team Fujisawa	
Sofia Mabergs	86%	Yumi Suzuki	86%
Agnes Knochenhauer	81%	Yumi Suzuki / Chinami Yoshida	82%
Sara McManus	92%	Chinami Yoshida	81%
Anna Hasselborg	89%	Satsuki Fujisawa	86%
Total	87%	Total	84%

==== Semifinals ====
Saturday, April 24, 8:00 pm

Sheet A	1	2	3	4	5	6	7	8	Final
(Switzerland) Silvana Tirinzoni 🔨	1	0	0	0	0	2	0	0	3
(Ontario) Rachel Homan	0	1	0	0	1	0	2	1	5

Player percentages
(Switzerland) Team Tirinzoni		(Ontario) Team Homan	
Melanie Barbezat	88%	Joanne Courtney	94%
Esther Neuenschwander	88%	Sarah Wilkes	80%
Silvana Tirinzoni	75%	Emma Miskew	84%
Alina Pätz	61%	Rachel Homan	94%
Total	78%	Total	88%

Sheet B	1	2	3	4	5	6	7	8	9	Final
(Manitoba) Kerri Einarson 🔨	1	1	0	0	0	1	1	0	1	5
(Sweden) Anna Hasselborg	0	0	2	1	0	0	0	1	0	4

Player percentages
(Manitoba) Team Einarson		(Sweden) Team Hasselborg	
Briane Meilleur	89%	Sofia Mabergs	82%
Shannon Birchard	79%	Agnes Knochenhauer	65%
Val Sweeting	81%	Sara McManus	93%
Kerri Einarson	83%	Anna Hasselborg	61%
Total	83%	Total	75%

==== Final ====
Sunday, April 25, 9:30 am

Sheet C	1	2	3	4	5	6	7	8	Final
(Ontario) Rachel Homan	0	0	1	0	0	1	0	X	2
(Manitoba) Kerri Einarson 🔨	2	1	0	1	0	0	1	X	5

Player percentages
(Ontario) Team Homan		(Manitoba) Team Einarson	
Joanne Courtney	84%	Briane Meilleur	97%
Sarah Wilkes	81%	Shannon Birchard	81%
Emma Miskew	83%	Val Sweeting	100%
Rachel Homan	68%	Kerri Einarson	85%
Total	79%	Total	91%
