= Briar Schwaller-Hürlimann =

Swiss curler (born 1993)

- Curler
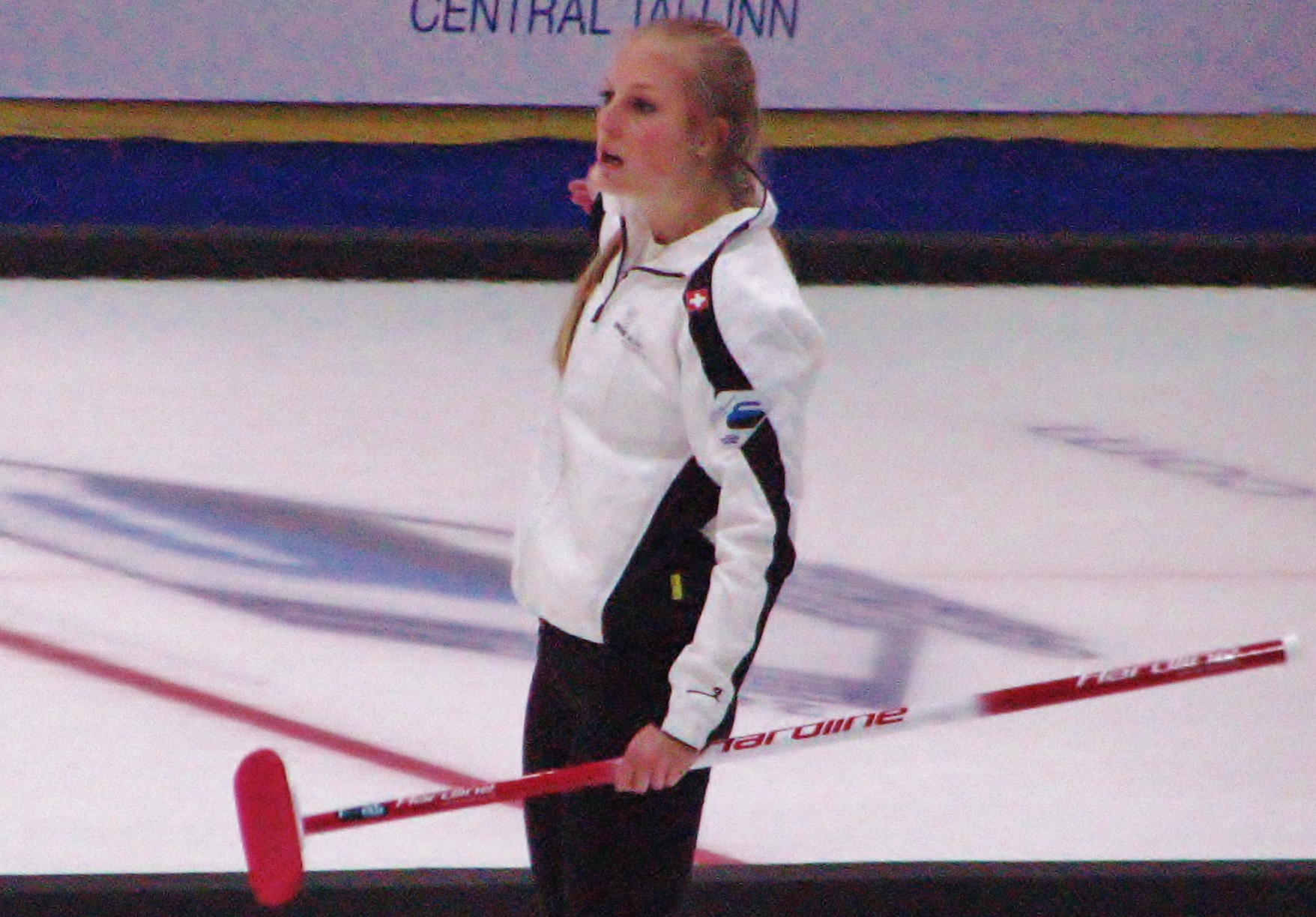
- Born: 30 September 1993 (age 33); Zug, Switzerland

Team
- Curling club: CC Oberwallis, Brig-Glis
- Mixed doubles partner: Yannick Schwaller

Curling career
- Member Association: Switzerland
- World Championship: 2 (2017, 2023)
- World Mixed Doubles Championship: 2 (2023, 2024)
- European Championship: 1 (2022)
- Olympic: 1 (2026)
- Grand Slam victories: 1 (2022 National)
Medal record
Women's curling
Representing Switzerland
World Championships
Gold medal – first place	2023 Sandviken
European Championships
Silver medal – second place	2022 Östersund
World Junior Championships
Bronze medal – third place	2015 Tallinn

Briar Schwaller-Hürlimann (born 30 September 1993 as Briar Hürlimann) is a Swiss curler from Recherswil. She won a World Women's Championship for Switzerland playing lead for Team Silvana Tirinzoni in 2023, and represented Switzerland in Mixed doubles at the 2026 Winter Olympics.

== Career ==
=== Juniors ===
Schwaller-Hürlimann first represented Switzerland on the international stage at the 2011 World Junior Curling Championships as third for Manuela Siegrist. They lost the tiebreaker to Sweden's Jonna McManus. She returned the following year at the 2012 World Junior Curling Championships, playing third for Melanie Barbezat. They were less successful than the previous year, finishing with a 3–6 record. After not representing Switzerland in 2013, Schwaller-Hürlimann made back to back appearances at the World Juniors. In 2014, they lost the tiebreaker 7–6 to Sweden's Isabella Wranå. In 2015, they won the bronze medal after defeating Wranå's Swedish team. Also in 2015, she competed in her first adult world championship at the 2015 World Mixed Curling Championship, playing third for Yannick Schwaller, where they would finish 5th. In 2017, Schwaller-Hürlimann represented Switzerland at the 2017 Winter Universiade. This time, they could not defeat Wranå in the bronze medal game, settling for fourth.

=== Women's ===
During the 2015–16 season, Schwaller-Hürlimann spared for Team Alina Pätz at the 2016 Players' Championship, in place of Marisa Winkelhausen. It was her first Grand Slam of Curling event. The team finished with a 1–4 record, only defeating Anna Sidorova's Russian rink. She also played in her first World Women's Curling Championships this season, as the alternate for 2015 World Champion Alina Pätz. She did not play in any games and the Swiss team settled for 8th after a 5–6 round robin record.

The 2018–19 season was a breakout year for Schwaller-Hürlimann and her team of skip Elena Stern, second Lisa Gisler and lead Céline Koller. They played in four Grand Slam events including winning the 2018 Tour Challenge Tier 2 and the 2018 Women's Masters Basel World Curling Tour event.

Team Stern followed their great season with an even better one for the 2019–20 season. They had a quarterfinal finish at the 2019 Cameron's Brewing Oakville Fall Classic. They missed the playoffs at their next three events, the 2019 Stu Sells Oakville Tankard, the 2019 AMJ Campbell Shorty Jenkins Classic and the inaugural WCT Uiseong International Curling Cup. Next, Team Stern played in the 2019 Canad Inns Women's Classic and qualified for the playoffs through the C side. They defeated Eve Muirhead in the quarterfinals, Silvana Tirinzoni in the semifinals and Rachel Homan in the final to win the event. They also won the International Bernese Ladies Cup and the Schweizer Cup. For the first time ever, they qualified for the playoffs at a Grand Slam event where they lost to Tracy Fleury in the quarterfinals at the Masters. They also qualified for the playoffs as the number one seed at the National but they also lost in the quarterfinals, this time to Satsuki Fujisawa. Team Stern surprised many when they upset the defending world champion rink Silvana Tirinzoni in the 2020 Swiss Women's Curling Championship three times and defeated them in the final 6–4. The team was set to represent Switzerland at the 2020 World Women's Curling Championship before the event got cancelled due to the COVID-19 pandemic. The Swiss championship would be their last event of the season as both the Players' Championship and the Champions Cup Grand Slam events were also cancelled due to the pandemic.

The Stern team began the abbreviated 2020–21 season by winning the 2020 Schweizer Cup, defeating Team Tirinzoni in the final. The team next played in the 2020 Women's Masters Basel, losing in the semifinals to Raphaela Keiser. Two weeks later, they competed in the 2.0 Cup, a men's tour event as the sole women's team. They lost in the C Qualifier game to Sweden's Fredrik Nyman. At the 2021 Swiss Women's Curling Championship, Team Stern could not defend their title, losing all five of their matches against the Tirinzoni rink. As they had won the Swiss Championship in 2020 but could not participate in the World Championship due to the cancellation, they played Team Tirinzoni in a best-of-five series to determine which team would represent Switzerland at the 2021 World Women's Curling Championship. Tirinzoni defeated Stern three games to zero in the series, earning themselves the spot at the World Championship. The team ended their season at the 2021 Champions Cup and 2021 Players' Championship Grand Slam events, which were played in a "curling bubble" in Calgary, Alberta, with no spectators, to avoid the spread of the coronavirus. The team finished winless in the Champions Cup and made the quarterfinals at the Players'. At the end of the season, Schwaller-Hürlimann and Schwaller won the 2021 WCT Arctic Cup in Dudinka, Russia.

After Team Tirinzoni qualified to represent Switzerland at the 2022 Winter Olympics, Elena Stern and Lisa Gisler both retired from competitive curling with Schwaller-Hürlimann and Céline Koller disbanding as well. She then joined her sister Corrie Hürlimann's team for the 2021–22 season. The team did not have much success on tour, only reaching one final at the Stu Sells 1824 Halifax Classic where they lost to Suzanne Birt. At the 2022 Swiss Women's Curling Championship, they finished fourth after a semifinal loss to the Tirinzoni rink. Schwaller-Hürlimann only remained with her sister for one season as on May 12, it was announced that she would be joining the new Tirinzoni rink at lead for the 2022–23 season. The team also included fourth Alina Pätz and second Carole Howald.

The new Tirinzoni rink found immediate success on tour, going undefeated in their first event to win the Summer Series. The following week, they lost to Team Clancy Grandy in the final of the 2022 Martensville International. The team next competed in the 2022 Women's Masters Basel where they lost in the semifinal to Raphaela Keiser. They bounced back immediately the following week at the 2022 Stu Sells Toronto Tankard, again going undefeated to claim their second event title of the season. Team Tirinzoni continued their strong play into the first Slam event of the season, the 2022 National. After an undefeated round robin record, the team beat Jennifer Jones 7–3 in the quarterfinals, Kaitlyn Lawes 7–5 in the semifinals, and Kerri Einarson 7–3 in the championship game to win their third tour event and Schwaller-Hürlimann's first Grand Slam title. The team was back on the ice the following week at the 2022 Western Showdown where after dropping their first game, they won seven straight to claim another title. Team Tirinzoni's event streak came to an end at the 2022 Tour Challenge where after a 4–0 round robin record, they lost 9–2 in the quarterfinals to Isabella Wranå. Next for the team was the 2022 European Curling Championships where they finished third in the round robin with a 6–3 record. They then beat Italy's Stefania Constantini in the semifinal before dropping the championship game 8–4 to Denmark's Madeleine Dupont. After much success in the first half of the season, the team missed the playoffs at their next two events, the 2022 Masters and the 2023 Canadian Open. They rebounded, however, at the 2023 International Bernese Ladies Cup, going a perfect 8–0 to win the event. At the 2023 Swiss Women's Curling Championship, the team won 6–4 over Corrie Hürlimann in the championship game. This qualified Team Tirinzoni for the 2023 World Women's Curling Championship where they continued their winning streak, going 12–0 through the round robin. They then topped Sweden's Anna Hasselborg 8–4 to qualify for the final against Norway's Marianne Rørvik. Despite not having their best game, the Swiss team stole two in the tenth end to win the game 6–3 and secure the World Championship title. Team Tirinzoni ended their season at the final two Slams of the season, the 2023 Players' Championship and the 2023 Champions Cup. At the Players', the team lost two straight before going on a six-game winning streak to qualify for the final. There, they lost 6–5 to Isabella Wranå. While Schwaller-Hürlimann was away representing Switzerland at the 2023 World Mixed Doubles Curling Championship, Team Tirinzoni decided to remove Schwaller-Hürlimann from the team for "team harmony" reasons. The team made the decision while Schwaller-Hürlimann was playing in the championship, but did not tell her until she travelled to Canada to play in the Champions Cup. Schwaller-Hürlimann was replaced by Rachel Erickson at the tournament.

Schwaller-Hürlimann rejoined her sister Corrie's team for the 2023–24 season as the alternate. She played in two events for the team, finishing fourth at the 2023 Oslo Cup and reaching the semifinals of the 2024 International Bernese Ladies Cup. At the 2024 Swiss Women's Championship, the team won just one game and failed to make the playoff round. Schwaller-Hürlimann would later announce that she would step back from team curling to focus on mixed doubles.

=== Mixed doubles ===
Schwaller-Hürlimann first competed in mixed doubles at the 2021 Swiss Mixed Doubles Curling Championship with partner Yannick Schwaller. The pair finished atop of the round robin standings with a 6–1 record, sending them directly to the best-of-three final where they played Alina Pätz and Sven Michel. They defeated Pätz / Michel two games to zero to claim the Swiss Mixed Doubles title. The pair then played against the 2020 Swiss champion rink of Jenny Perret and Martin Rios to decide who would represent Switzerland at the 2021 World Mixed Doubles Curling Championship. They lost the best-of-five series three games to zero.

Schwaller-Hürlimann and her now husband Yannick Schwaller won the 2023 Swiss Mixed Doubles Curling Championship, qualifying them to represent Switzerland at the 2023 World Mixed Doubles Curling Championship. There, the pair finished the round robin with a 7–2 record, however, due to tie-breaking logistics and last stone draw totals, they finished fourth in their pool and did not advance to the playoffs. The following year, Briar and Yannick would win their second consecutive Swiss Mixed Doubles Curling Championship, defeating Carole Howald and Pablo Lachat in the final. At the 2024 World Mixed Doubles Curling Championship, they would finish 6–3 in the round robin, qualifying for the playoffs, but would finish 4th after losing 6–5 to Norway's Kristin Skaslien and Magnus Nedregotten in the bronze medal game. Briar and Yannick would fail to win their third consecutive Swiss national title in 2025, finishing 4–3 after round robin play, failing to qualify for the playoffs. However, they would later be named the Swiss representatives for the 2026 Winter Olympics mixed doubles tournament.

== Personal life ==
Schwaller-Hürlimann's parents Janet Hürlimann and Patrick Hürlimann were also both curlers. Her father won a gold medal at the 1998 Winter Olympics. She is currently employed as a teacher. In July 2022 she married fellow curler Yannick Schwaller and changed her surname to Schwaller-Hürlimann.

== Grand Slam record ==
Key
C	Champion
F	Lost in Final
SF	Lost in Semifinal
QF	Lost in Quarterfinals
R16	Lost in the round of 16
Q	Did not advance to playoffs
T2	Played in Tier 2 event
DNP	Did not participate in event
N/A	Not a Grand Slam event that season

Event	2015–16	2016–17	2017–18	2018–19	2019–20	2020–21	2021–22	2022–23
Tour Challenge	DNP	DNP	DNP	T2	Q	N/A	N/A	QF
The National	DNP	DNP	DNP	DNP	QF	N/A	DNP	C
Masters	DNP	DNP	DNP	DNP	QF	N/A	DNP	Q
Canadian Open	DNP	DNP	DNP	Q	Q	N/A	N/A	Q
Players'	Q (Note: Spared for Marisa Winkelhausen on Team Alina Pätz.)	DNP	DNP	Q	N/A	QF	DNP	F
Champions Cup	DNP	DNP	DNP	Q	N/A	Q	DNP	DNP

== Teams ==
Season	Skip	Third	Second	Lead	Alternate
2010–11	Manuela Siegrist	Briar Hürlimann	Claudia Hug	Janine Wyss	
2011–12	Melanie Barbezat	Briar Hürlimann	Mara Gautschi	Janine Wyss	
2013–14	Briar Hürlimann (Fourth)	Corina Mani (Skip)	Rahel Thoma	Tamara Michel	
2014–15	Briar Hürlimann (Fourth)	Lisa Gisler (Skip)	Rahel Thoma	Corina Mani	
2015–16	Ursi Hegner	Briar Hürlimann	Nina Ledergerber	Claudia Baumann	
2016–17	Briar Hürlimann (Fourth)	Elena Stern (Skip)	Anna Stern	Céline Koller	
2017–18	Briar Hürlimann (Fourth)	Elena Stern (Skip)	Lisa Gisler	Céline Koller	Anna Stern
2018–19	Briar Hürlimann (Fourth)	Elena Stern (Skip)	Lisa Gisler	Céline Koller	
2019–20	Briar Hürlimann (Fourth)	Elena Stern (Skip)	Lisa Gisler	Céline Koller	
2020–21	Briar Hürlimann (Fourth)	Elena Stern (Skip)	Lisa Gisler	Céline Koller	
2021–22	Briar Hürlimann (Fourth)	Corrie Hürlimann (Skip)	Melina Bezzola	Anna Gut	Jessica Jäggi
2022–23	Alina Pätz (Fourth)	Silvana Tirinzoni (Skip)	Carole Howald	Briar Schwaller-Hürlimann	
2023–24	Corrie Hürlimann	Celine Schwizgebel	Sarah Müller	Marina Lörtscher	Briar Schwaller-Hürlimann
