= Elena Stern =

Swiss curler (born 1994)

- Curler
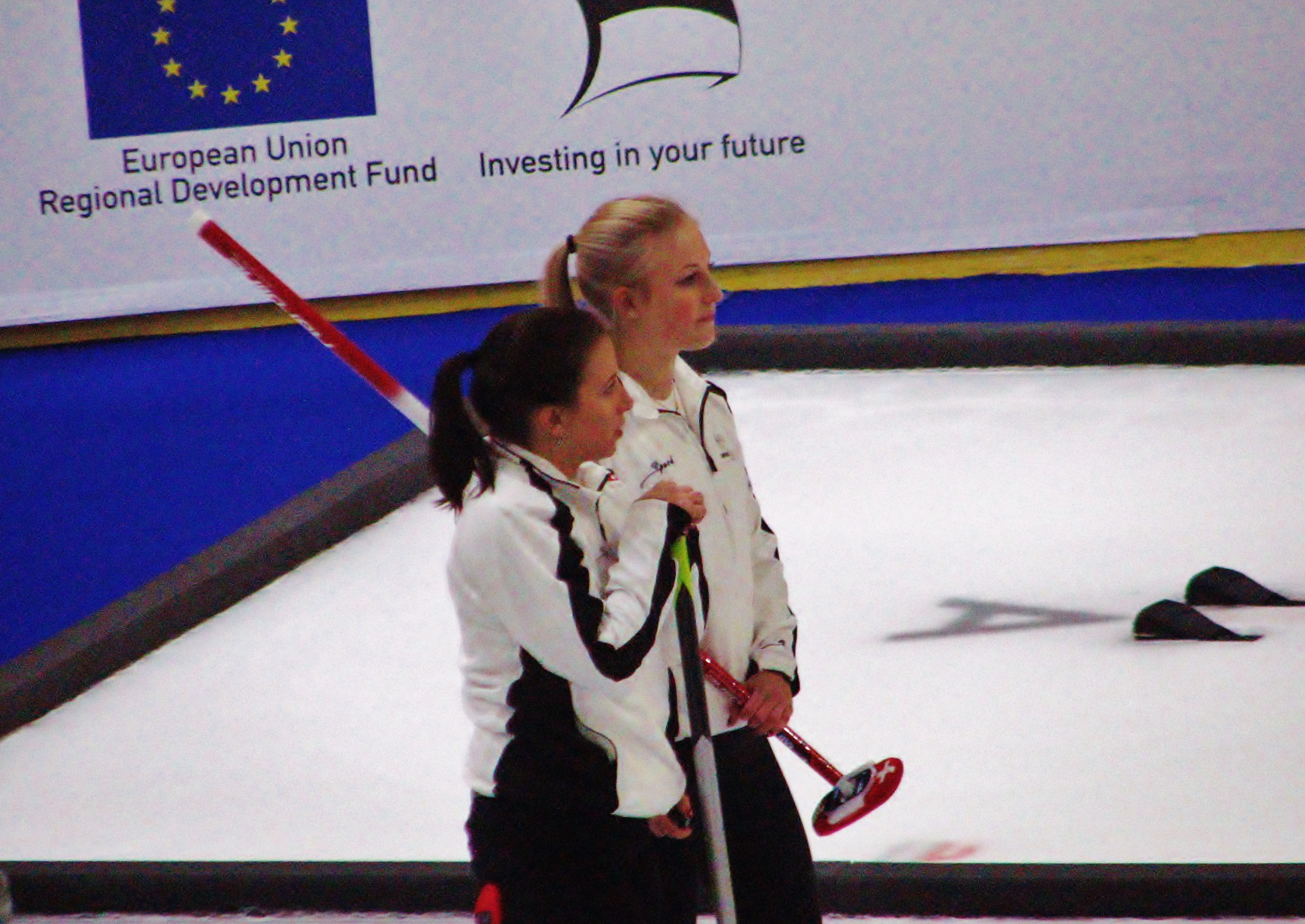
- Born: 8 November 1994 (age 32); Wetzikon, Switzerland

Team
- Curling club: CC Oberwallis, Brig-Glis

Curling career
- Member Association: Switzerland
- European Championship: 1 (2015)
Medal record
Women's curling
Representing Switzerland
Winter Youth Olympics
Gold medal – first place	2012 Innsbruck
World Junior Championships
Bronze medal – third place	2015 Tallinn

Elena Stern (born 8 November 1994) is a retired Swiss curler from Zürich.

== Career ==
Stern first represented Switzerland on the international stage at the 2012 Winter Youth Olympics where her team of Michael Brunner, Romano Meier and Lisa Gisler won the gold medal. In 2014, she played in her first World Junior Curling Championship as the alternate for Corina Mani. They lost the tiebreaker 7–6 to Sweden's Isabella Wranå. She returned the following season at the 2015 World Junior Curling Championships, this time as lead for Lisa Gisler. Her Swiss team won the bronze medal. In 2015 she also played in her first European Curling Championship as alternate for Alina Pätz. She did not play in any games. Stern returned for her third consecutive year to the World Juniors at the 2016 World Junior Curling Championships. She skipped her team to a 4–5 record, missing the playoffs.

Stern made back to back appearances at the World Mixed Curling Championship in 2016 and 2017. In 2016, they lost in the quarterfinals and in 2017 they missed the playoffs. She also skipped the Swiss team to a fourth-place finish at the 2017 Winter Universiade.

The 2018–19 season was a breakout year for Stern and her team of fourth Briar Hürlimann, second Lisa Gisler and lead Céline Koller. They played in four Grand Slam of Curling, and won the 2018 Tour Challenge Tier 2 and the 2018 Women's Masters Basel World Curling Tour events.

Team Stern followed their great season with an even better one for the 2019–20 season. They had a quarterfinal finish at the 2019 Cameron's Brewing Oakville Fall Classic. They missed the playoffs at their next three events, the 2019 Stu Sells Oakville Tankard, the 2019 AMJ Campbell Shorty Jenkins Classic and the inaugural WCT Uiseong International Curling Cup. Next, Team Stern played in the 2019 Canad Inns Women's Classic and qualified for the playoffs threw the C side. They successfully defeated Eve Muirhead in the quarterfinals, Silvana Tirinzoni in the semifinals and Rachel Homan in the final to win the event. They also won the International Bernese Ladies Cup and the Schweizer Cup. For the first time ever, they qualified for the playoffs at a Grand Slam event where they lost to Tracy Fleury in the quarterfinals at the Masters. They also qualified for the playoffs as the number one seed at the National but they also lost in the quarterfinals, this time to Satsuki Fujisawa. Team Stern surprised many when they upset the defending world champion rink Silvana Tirinzoni in the 2020 Swiss Women's Curling Championship three times and defeated them in the final 6–4. The team was set to represent Switzerland at the 2020 World Women's Curling Championship before the event got cancelled due to the COVID-19 pandemic. The Swiss championship would be their last event of the season as both the Players' Championship and the Champions Cup Grand Slam events were also cancelled due to the pandemic.

Stern and her team began the abbreviated 2020–21 season by winning the 2020 Schweizer Cup, defeating Team Tirinzoni in the final. The team next played in the 2020 Women's Masters Basel, losing in the semifinals to Raphaela Keiser. Two weeks later, they competed in the 2.0 Cup, a men's tour event as the sole women's team. They lost in the C Qualifier game to Sweden's Fredrik Nyman. At the 2021 Swiss Women's Curling Championship, the team could not defend their title, losing all five of their matches against the Tirinzoni rink. As they had won the Swiss Championship in 2020 but could not participate in the World Championship due to the cancellation, Team Stern played Team Tirinzoni in a best-of-five series to determine which team would represent Switzerland at the 2021 World Women's Curling Championship. Tirinzoni defeated Stern three games to zero in the series, earning themselves the spot at the World Championship. Stern and her team ended their season at the 2021 Champions Cup and 2021 Players' Championship Grand Slam events, which were played in a "curling bubble" in Calgary, Alberta, with no spectators, to avoid the spread of the coronavirus. The team finished winless in the Champions Cup and made the quarterfinals at the Players'.

Stern retired from competitive curling in 2021, after not qualifying to represent Switzerland at the 2022 Winter Olympics.

== Personal life ==
Stern works as a communications officer.

== Grand Slam record ==
Key
C	Champion
F	Lost in Final
SF	Lost in Semifinal
QF	Lost in Quarterfinals
R16	Lost in the round of 16
Q	Did not advance to playoffs
T2	Played in Tier 2 event
DNP	Did not participate in event
N/A	Not a Grand Slam event that season

Event	2018–19	2019–20	2020–21
Masters	DNP	QF	N/A
Tour Challenge	T2	Q	N/A
The National	DNP	QF	N/A
Canadian Open	Q	Q	N/A
Champions Cup	Q	N/A	Q
Players'	Q	N/A	QF

== Teams ==
Season	Skip	Third	Second	Lead
2013–14	Elena Stern	Anna Stern	Noëlle Iseli	Tanja Schwegler
2014–15	Elena Stern	Anna Stern	Noëlle Iseli	Tanja Schwegler
2015–16	Elena Stern	Anna Stern	Noëlle Iseli	Tanja Schwegler
2016–17	Briar Hürlimann (Fourth)	Elena Stern (Skip)	Anna Stern	Céline Koller
2017–18	Briar Hürlimann (Fourth)	Elena Stern (Skip)	Lisa Gisler	Céline Koller
2018–19	Briar Hürlimann (Fourth)	Elena Stern (Skip)	Lisa Gisler	Céline Koller
2019–20	Briar Hürlimann (Fourth)	Elena Stern (Skip)	Lisa Gisler	Céline Koller
2020–21	Briar Hürlimann (Fourth)	Elena Stern (Skip)	Lisa Gisler	Céline Koller
