= Schweizer Cup (curling) =

- Established: 2018
- Host city: Baden, Switzerland
- Arena: Baden Regio Curling Club
- Purse: CHF 11,000

Current champions (2020)
- Men: (Canton of Schaffhausen) Andrin Schnider
- Women: (Valais) Elena Stern

Current edition
- 2020 Schweizer Cup

The Schweizer Cup (French: Cup Suisse) is an annual bonspiel, or curling tournament, held in Baden, Switzerland. It is organized by the Swiss Curling Association and is similar to the Canada Cup held in Canada each year. It was established in 2018. It was a World Curling Tour event in 2018 and 2019, but was dropped in 2020.

== Past champions ==
=== Men ===
Year	Winner	Runner up	Purse (CDN)
2018	(Canton of Bern) Yannick Schwaller, Michael Brunner, Romano Meier, Marcel Käufeler	(Canton of Geneva) Benoît Schwarz (Fourth), Sven Michel, Peter de Cruz (Skip), Valentin Tanner	$15,316
2019	(Canton of Geneva) Benoît Schwarz (Fourth), Sven Michel, Peter de Cruz (Skip), Valentin Tanner	(Canton of Zug) Lucien Lottenbach, Rainer Kobler, Patrick Abächerli, Tom Winkelhausen	$14,749
2020	(Canton of Schaffhausen) Andrin Schnider, Oliver Widmer, Nicola Stoll, Fabian Schmid	(Canton of Bern) Yannick Schwaller, Michael Brunner, Romano Meier, Marcel Käufeler	CHF 11,000

=== Women ===
Year	Winner	Runner up	Purse (CDN)
2018	(Aargau) Alina Pätz (Fourth), Silvana Tirinzoni (Skip), Esther Neuenschwander, Melanie Barbezat	(Valais) Briar Hürlimann (Fourth), Elena Stern (Skip), Lisa Gisler, Céline Koller	$15,316
2019	(Valais) Briar Hürlimann (Fourth), Elena Stern (Skip), Lisa Gisler, Céline Koller	(Canton of Zurich) Nora Wüest, Marina Hauser, Ladina Müller, Lisa Gugler	$14,749
2020	(Valais) Briar Hürlimann (Fourth), Elena Stern (Skip), Lisa Gisler, Céline Koller	(Aargau) Alina Pätz (Fourth), Silvana Tirinzoni (Skip), Esther Neuenschwander, Melanie Barbezat	CHF 11,000

=== Mixed doubles ===
The Schweizer Cup mixed doubles event is held separately on a different date at the Eissportzentrum Lerchenfeld in St. Gallen.

Year	Winning pair	Runner up pair	Purse (CDN)
2018	(Canton of Glarus) Jenny Perret / Martin Rios	(Canton of Zug) Daniela Rupp / Kevin Wunderlin	$7,000
2019	(Canton of Glarus) Jenny Perret / Martin Rios	(Canton of Bern) Michèle Jäggi / Marc Pfister	$7,374
2020	(Aargau) Alina Pätz / Sven Michel	(Canton of Glarus) Jenny Perret / Martin Rios	CHF 5,500
