= Elena Mathis =

Swiss–Italian curler (born 1999)

- Curler
- Born: 31 August 1999 (age 27); Wetzikon, Switzerland

Team
- Curling club: (Switzerland) CC Luzern (Lucerne), (Switzerland) CC St. Moritz (St. Moritz), (Italy) CC Dolomiti (Cortina d'Ampezzo)
- Skip: Giulia Zardini Lacedelli
- Third: Elena Mathis
- Second: Marta Lo Deserto
- Lead: Rachele Scalesse

Curling career
- Member Association: Switzerland; Italy
- World Championship: 3 (2024, 2025, 2026)
- European Championship: 4 (2023, 2024, 2025, 2026)
- Olympic: 1 (2026)
- Other appearances: World Junior Championships: 3 (2017, 2018, 2020)
Medal record
Curling
Representing Italy
European Championships
Silver medal – second place	2023 Aberdeen

Elena Antonia Mathis Falivena (born 31 August 1999) is a Swiss–Italian curler. She currently plays third on Team Giulia Zardini Lacedelli.

At the national level, she is a three-time Swiss Junior champion curler.

At the international level, she competed for Switzerland in three World Junior Championships, and for Italy at the 2023 European Curling Championships.

She moved from Switzerland to Italy in the summer of 2023 to play for the Italian National Women's Team, skipped by Stefania Constantini.

== Personal life ==
She was born on 31 August 1999 in Wetzikon, Switzerland. As of 2024, Mathis is a student. She lives in Bäretswil, Switzerland. She is of Italian descent through her mother.

== Teams ==
=== Switzerland ===
Season	Skip	Third	Second	Lead	Alternate	Coach	Events
2015–16	Selina Witschonke	Elena Mathis	Melina Bezzola	Anna Gut	Larissa Schmid	Sandra Witschonke	SJCC 2016 (gold)
2016–17	Selina Witschonke	Elena Mathis	Melina Bezzola	Anna Gut		Nicole Dünki, Sandra Witschonke	SJCC 2017 (gold)
2016–17	Selina Witschonke	Elena Mathis	Melina Bezzola	Anna Gut	Laura Engler	Sandra Witschonke	WJCC 2017 (5th)
2017–18	Selina Witschonke	Elena Mathis	Melina Bezzola	Anna Gut	Laura Engler	Sandra Witschonke	WJCC 2018 (7th)
2018–19	Jana Stritt	Elena Mathis	Marina Lörtscher	Anna Gut	Mirjam Ott	Mirjam Ott	SWCC 2019 (bronze)
2019–20	Selina Witschonke	Elena Mathis	Marina Lörtscher	Anna Gut	Sarah Müller	Mirjam Ott	WJCC 2020 (5th)
2020–21	Selina Witschonke (Fourth)	Elena Mathis	Raphaela Keiser (Skip)	Marina Lörtscher		Binia Feltscher-Beeli	SWCC 2021 (bronze)
2021–22	Selina Witschonke (Fourth)	Elena Mathis	Raphaela Keiser (Skip)	Marina Lörtscher	Binia Feltscher-Beeli	Binia Feltscher-Beeli	SWCC 2022 (silver)
2022–23	Selina Witschonke (Fourth)	Elena Mathis	Raphaela Keiser (Skip)	Marina Lörtscher	Malin Da Ros	Binia Feltscher	SWCC 2023 (bronze)

=== Italy ===
Season	Skip	Third	Second	Lead	Alternate	Coach	Events
2023–24	Stefania Constantini	Elena Mathis	Angela Romei	Giulia Zardini Lacedelli	Marta Lo Deserto	Violetta Caldart, Marco Mariani	ECC 2023 (silver); WWCC 2024 (4th)
2024–25	Stefania Constantini	Giulia Zardini Lacedelli	Elena Mathis	Angela Romei	Marta Lo Deserto	Violetta Caldart, Marco Mariani	ECC 2024 (4th); WWCC 2025 (10th)
2025–26	Stefania Constantini	Elena Mathis	Angela Romei	Giulia Zardini Lacedelli	Marta Lo Deserto	Violetta Caldart, Marco Mariani	ECC 2025 (7th)
2025–26	Stefania Constantini	Elena Mathis	Marta Lo Deserto	Giulia Zardini Lacedelli	Rebecca Mariani	Sören Grahn, Marco Mariani	WOG 2026 (9th); WWCC 2026 (8th)
2026–27	Giulia Zardini Lacedelli	Elena Mathis	Marta Lo Deserto	Rachele Scalesse			
