= Lisa Gisler =

Swiss curler

- Curler
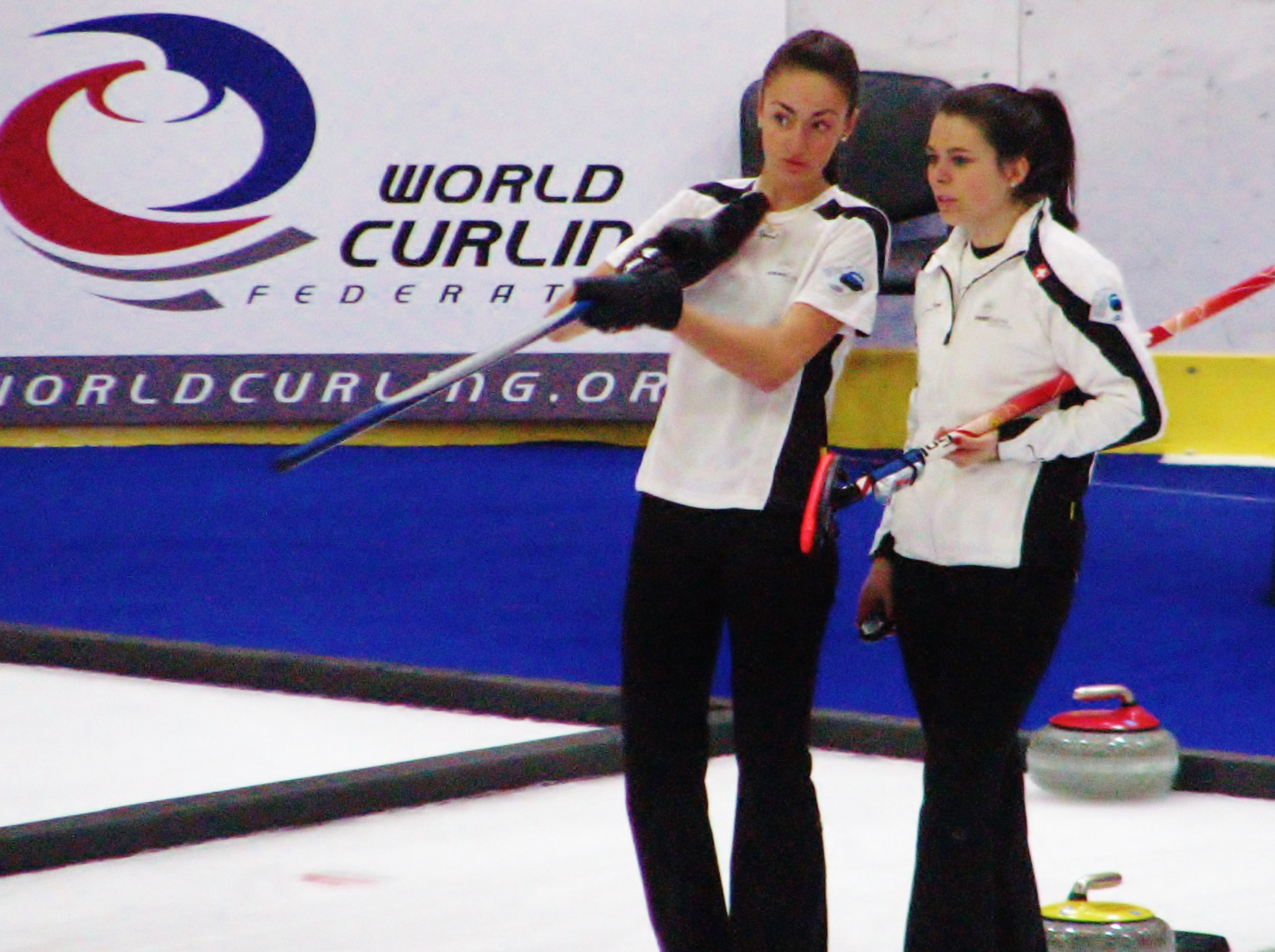
- Born: 15 March 1994 (age 32); Mötschwil, Switzerland

Team
- Curling club: CC Oberwallis, Brig-Glis

Curling career
- Member Association: Switzerland
Medal record
Women's curling
Representing Switzerland
Winter Youth Olympics
Gold medal – first place	2012 Innsbruck
World Junior Curling Championships
Bronze medal – third place	2015 Tallinn

Lisa Gisler (born 15 March 1994) is a retired Swiss curler from Olten.

== Career ==
Gisler first represented Switzerland on the international stage at the 2012 Winter Youth Olympics where her team of Michael Brunner, Elena Stern and Romano Meier won the gold medal.

In 2014, Gisler was a young ambassador for the 2014 Summer Youth Olympics. Her job was to promote the Youth Olympics in Switzerland and get the Swiss athletes to interact with other athletes from different countries and participate in activities and workshops.

Gisler represented Switzerland in two World Junior Curling Championships: 2013 and 2015. In 2013, her team failed to make the playoffs after going 3–6 in the round robin. In 2015, she skipped the team to a bronze medal after defeating Isabella Wranå 7–6 in the bronze medal game.

The 2018–19 season was a breakout year for Gisler and her team of skip Elena Stern, fourth Briar Hürlimann and lead Céline Koller. They played in four Grand Slam of Curling events including winning the 2018 Tour Challenge Tier 2 and the 2018 Women's Masters Basel World Curling Tour event.

Team Stern followed their great season with an even better one for the 2019–20 season. They had a quarterfinal finish at the 2019 Cameron's Brewing Oakville Fall Classic. They missed the playoffs at their next three events, the 2019 Stu Sells Oakville Tankard, the 2019 AMJ Campbell Shorty Jenkins Classic and the inaugural WCT Uiseong International Curling Cup. Next, Team Stern played in the 2019 Canad Inns Women's Classic and qualified for the playoffs threw the C side. They defeated Eve Muirhead in the quarterfinals, Silvana Tirinzoni in the semifinals and Rachel Homan in the final to win the event. They also won the International Bernese Ladies Cup and the Schweizer Cup. For the first time, they qualified for the playoffs at a Grand Slam event where they lost to Tracy Fleury in the quarterfinals at the Masters. They also qualified for the playoffs as the number one seed at the National but they also lost in the quarterfinals, this time to Satsuki Fujisawa. Team Stern surprised many when they upset the defending world champion rink Silvana Tirinzoni in the 2020 Swiss Women's Curling Championship three times and defeated them in the final 6–4. The team was set to represent Switzerland at the 2020 World Women's Curling Championship before the event got cancelled due to the COVID-19 pandemic. The Swiss championship would be their last event of the season as both the Players' Championship and the Champions Cup Grand Slam events were also cancelled due to the pandemic.

The Stern team began the abbreviated 2020–21 season by winning the 2020 Schweizer Cup, defeating Team Tirinzoni in the final. The team next played in the 2020 Women's Masters Basel, losing in the semifinals to Raphaela Keiser. Two weeks later, they competed in the 2.0 Cup, a men's tour event as the sole women's team. They lost in the C Qualifier game to Sweden's Fredrik Nyman. In January 2021, Gisler competed at the 2021 Swiss Mixed Doubles Curling Championship with partner Romano Meier. After starting the tournament with three straight wins, the pair lost their next four games, eliminating them from contention. At the 2021 Swiss Women's Curling Championship, Team Stern could not defend their title, losing all five of their matches against the Tirinzoni rink. As they had won the Swiss Championship in 2020 but could not participate in the World Championship due to the cancellation, they played Team Tirinzoni in a best-of-five series to determine which team would represent Switzerland at the 2021 World Women's Curling Championship. Tirinzoni defeated Stern three games to zero in the series, earning themselves the spot at the World Championship. The team ended their season at the 2021 Champions Cup and 2021 Players' Championship Grand Slam events, which were played in a "curling bubble" in Calgary, Alberta, with no spectators, to avoid the spread of the coronavirus. The team finished winless in the Champions Cup and made the quarterfinals at the Players'. Gisler stepped away from the game at the end of the 2020–21 season.

== Personal life ==
As of 2020, Gisler is a business trainee. Currently she works as an HR Specialist.

== Grand Slam record ==
Key
C	Champion
F	Lost in Final
SF	Lost in Semifinal
QF	Lost in Quarterfinals
R16	Lost in the round of 16
Q	Did not advance to playoffs
T2	Played in Tier 2 event
DNP	Did not participate in event
N/A	Not a Grand Slam event that season

Event	2018–19	2019–20	2020–21
Masters	DNP	QF	N/A
Tour Challenge	T2	Q	N/A
The National	DNP	QF	N/A
Canadian Open	Q	Q	N/A
Champions Cup	Q	N/A	Q
Players'	Q	N/A	QF

== Teams ==
Season	Skip	Third	Second	Lead
2012–13	Michelle Gribi	Lisa Gisler	Chantal Bugnon	Vera Camponovo
2013–14	Michelle Gribi	Lisa Gisler	Chantal Bugnon	Vera Camponovo
2014–15	Briar Hürlimann (fourth)	Lisa Gisler (skip)	Rahel Thoma	Corina Mani
2015–16	Lisa Gisler	Corina Mani	Sina Wettstein	Janine Wyss
2016–17	Lisa Gisler	Corina Mani	Sina Wettstein	Janine Wyss
2017–18	Briar Hürlimann (fourth)	Elena Stern (skip)	Lisa Gisler	Céline Koller
2018–19	Briar Hürlimann (fourth)	Elena Stern (skip)	Lisa Gisler	Céline Koller
2019–20	Briar Hürlimann (fourth)	Elena Stern (skip)	Lisa Gisler	Céline Koller
2020–21	Briar Hürlimann (fourth)	Elena Stern (skip)	Lisa Gisler	Céline Koller
