= Raphaela Keiser =

Swiss curler

- Curler
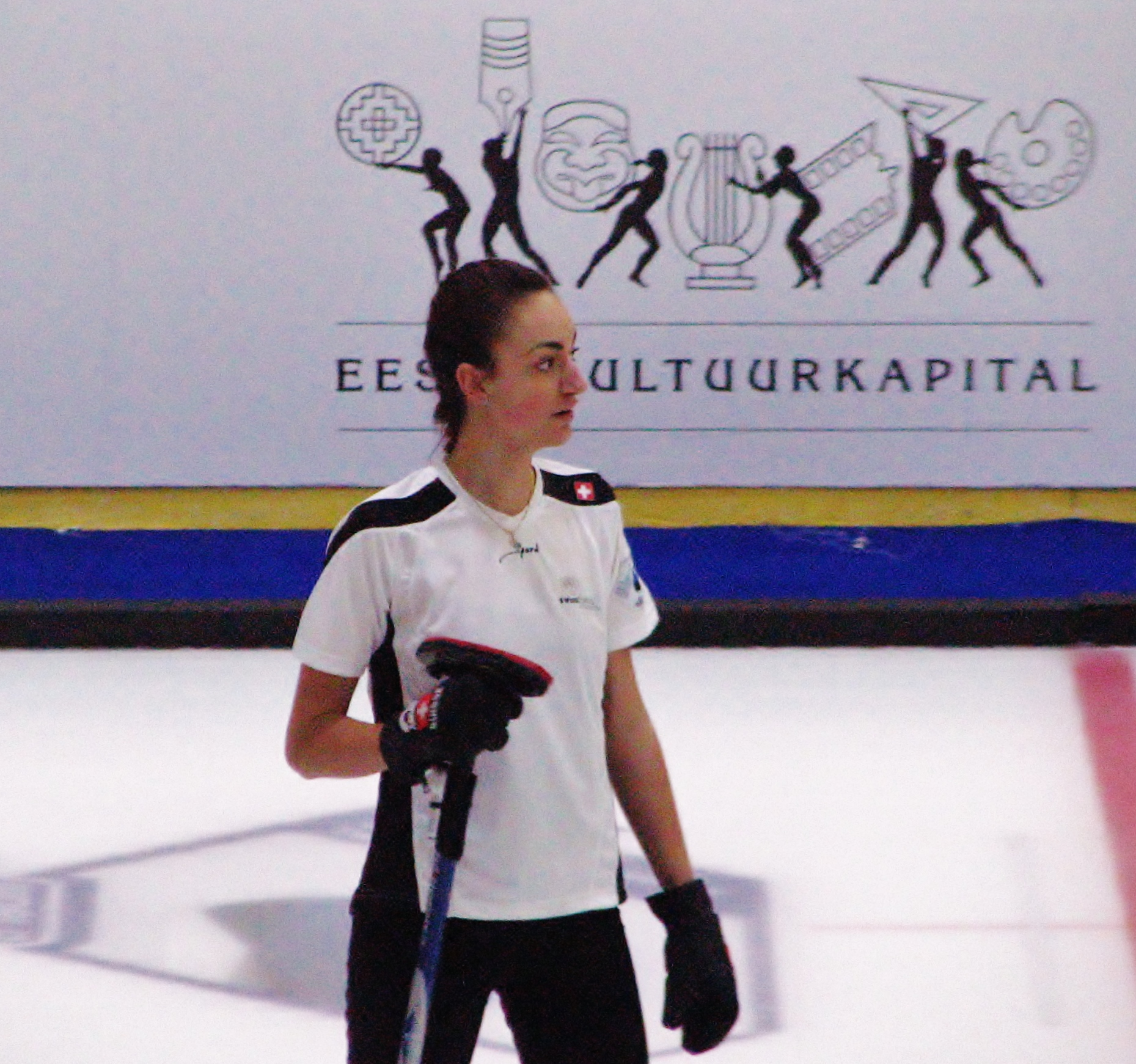
- Keiser at the 2015 World Junior Curling Championships
- Born: 13 July 1997 (age 29)

Team
- Curling club: CC St.Gallen-Bern, St. Gallen/Bern, Flims-St.Gallen

Curling career
- Member Association: Switzerland
- World Championship: 1 (2018)
- Other appearances: World Junior Championships: 2 (2015, 2019)
Medal record
Curling
Representing Switzerland
World Junior Championships
Bronze medal – third place	2015 Tallinn
Bronze medal – third place	2019 Liverpool

Raphaela Keiser (born 13 July 1997) is a Swiss curler.

== Teams ==
=== Women's ===
Season	Skip	Third	Second	Lead	Alternate	Coach	Events
2012–13	Raphaela Keiser	Chantal Hürlimann	Corrie Hürlimann	Ines Amstad	Lara Moser, Briar Hürlimann	Janet Hürlimann	SJCC 2013 (5th)
2014–15	Briar Hürlimann (Fourth)	Lisa Gisler (Skip)	Rahel Thoma	Elena Stern	Raphaela Keiser	Rolf Hösli	WJCC 2015 (bronze)
2015–16	Raphaela Keiser	Adonia Brunner	Laura Engler	Gisèle Beuchat		Roland Ryf, Brigitte Brunner	SJCC 2016 (silver)
2016–17	Raphaela Keiser	Laura Engler	Roxane Héritier	Nehla Meier	Mara Grassi	Stephan Keiser, Roger Engler	SJCC 2017 (silver)
2017–18	Binia Feltscher	Irene Schori	Franziska Kaufmann	Carole Howald	Raphaela Keiser	Allan Moore	WCC 2018 (8th)
2018–19	Selina Witschonke (Fourth)	Raphaela Keiser (Skip)	Laura Engler	Vanessa Tonoli	Nehla Meier	Stephan Keiser	WJCC 2019 (bronze)
2020–21	Selina Witschonke (Fourth)	Elena Mathis	Raphaela Keiser (Skip)	Marina Lörtscher		Binia Feltscher	
2021–22	Selina Witschonke (Fourth)	Elena Mathis	Raphaela Keiser (Skip)	Marina Lörtscher		Binia Feltscher	
2022–23	Selina Witschonke (Fourth)	Elena Mathis	Raphaela Keiser (Skip)	Marina Lörtscher		Binia Feltscher	

=== Mixed ===
Season	Skip	Third	Second	Lead	Events
2016–17	Raphaela Keiser	Michael Probst	Gisele Beuchat	Chahan Karnusian	SMxCC 2017 (8th)

== Personal life ==
Her father is Swiss curler and coach Stephan Keiser, a 1996 World Men's bronze medallist and a 1996 Swiss men's champion.

== Grand Slam record ==
Key
C	Champion
F	Lost in Final
SF	Lost in Semifinal
QF	Lost in Quarterfinals
R16	Lost in the round of 16
Q	Did not advance to playoffs
T2	Played in Tier 2 event
DNP	Did not participate in event
N/A	Not a Grand Slam event that season

Event	2022–23
The National	QF
Tour Challenge	Q
Masters	Q
Canadian Open	Q
