= 2014 The Masters Grand Slam of Curling =

Grand Slam of Curling event

- Host city: Selkirk, Manitoba
- Arena: Selkirk Recreational Complex
- Dates: Oct. 28 – Nov. 2
- Men's winner: (Newfoundland and Labrador) Brad Gushue
- Curling club: Bally Haly G&CC, St. John's
- Skip: Brad Gushue
- Third: Mark Nichols
- Second: Brett Gallant
- Lead: Geoff Walker
- Finalist: (Manitoba) Mike McEwen
- Women's winner: (Alberta) Valerie Sweeting
- Curling club: Saville SC, Edmonton
- Skip: Valerie Sweeting
- Third: Cathy Overton-Clapham
- Second: Dana Ferguson
- Lead: Rachelle Brown
- Finalist: (Sweden) Margaretha Sigfridsson

The 2014 Masters Grand Slam of Curling was held from October 28 to November 2 at the Selkirk Recreational Complex in Selkirk, Manitoba. It was the first men's Grand Slam event of the season and the second women's Grand Slam event of the season.

In the women's final, Valerie Sweeting of Edmonton won her first Grand Slam title with a 5–4 victory over Olympic silver medallist Margaretha Sigfridsson of Sweden. In the men's final, Brad Gushue of St. John's won his first Grand Slam title with an 8–6 victory over Mike McEwen of Winnipeg.

== Men ==
=== Teams ===
The teams are listed as follows:

Skip	Third	Second	Lead	Locale
Jim Cotter	Ryan Kuhn	Tyrel Griffith	Rick Sawatsky	Kelowna/Vernon, British Columbia
Benoît Schwarz (fourth)	Peter de Cruz (skip)	Claudio Pätz	Valentin Tanner	Geneva, Switzerland
Niklas Edin	Oskar Eriksson	Kristian Lindström	Christoffer Sundgren	Karlstad, Sweden
John Epping	Travis Fanset	Patrick Janssen	Tim March	Toronto, Ontario
Brad Gushue	Mark Nichols	Brett Gallant	Geoff Walker	Newfoundland and Labrador
Glenn Howard	Richard Hart	Jon Mead	Craig Savill	Penetanguishene, Ontario
Brad Jacobs	Ryan Fry	E. J. Harnden	Ryan Harnden	Sault Ste. Marie, Ontario
Kevin Koe	Marc Kennedy	Brent Laing	Ben Hebert	Calgary, Alberta
Steve Laycock	Kirk Muyres	Colton Flasch	Dallan Muyres	Saskatoon, Saskatchewan
Mike McEwen	B. J. Neufeld	Matt Wozniak	Denni Neufeld	Winnipeg, Manitoba
Sven Michel	Florian Meister	Simon Gempeler	Stefan Meienberg	Adelboden, Switzerland
John Morris	Pat Simmons	Scott Bailey	Nolan Thiessen	Calgary, Alberta
David Murdoch	Greg Drummond	Scott Andrews	Michael Goodfellow	Stirling, Scotland
Jeff Stoughton	Rob Fowler	Alex Forrest	Connor Njegovan	Winnipeg, Manitoba
Thomas Ulsrud	Torger Nergård	Christoffer Svae	Håvard Vad Petersson	Oslo, Norway

=== Round-robin standings ===
Final round-robin standings

Key
Teams to Playoffs
Teams to Tiebreakers

Pool A	W	L
(Alberta) Kevin Koe	3	1
(Saskatchewan) Steve Laycock	3	1
(Sweden) Niklas Edin	2	2
(Ontario) Brad Jacobs	2	2
(British Columbia) Jim Cotter	0	4

Pool B	W	L
(Manitoba) Mike McEwen	3	1
(Switzerland) Sven Michel	3	1
(Alberta) John Morris	2	2
(Switzerland) Peter de Cruz	1	3
(Scotland) David Murdoch	1	3

Pool C	W	L
(Ontario) John Epping	3	1
(Newfoundland and Labrador) Brad Gushue	3	1
(Ontario) Glenn Howard	2	2
(Manitoba) Jeff Stoughton	2	2
(Norway) Thomas Ulsrud	0	4

=== Round-robin results ===
The draw is listed as follows:

==== Draw 1 ====
Tuesday, October 28, 7:00 pm

Sheet D	1	2	3	4	5	6	7	8	Final
(Scotland) David Murdoch	0	0	0	0	0	0	0	X	0
(Switzerland) Sven Michel 🔨	0	1	0	0	0	1	2	X	4

Sheet E	1	2	3	4	5	6	7	8	9	Final
(Newfoundland and Labrador) Brad Gushue	0	0	2	0	0	0	0	1	0	3
(Manitoba) Jeff Stoughton 🔨	1	0	0	1	0	1	0	0	2	5

==== Draw 3 ====
Wednesday, October 29, 12:30 pm

Sheet C	1	2	3	4	5	6	7	8	Final
(Sweden) Niklas Edin 🔨	0	1	1	1	0	0	2	0	5
(Saskatchewan) Steve Laycock	1	0	0	0	2	1	0	2	6

Sheet D	1	2	3	4	5	6	7	8	Final
(Norway) Thomas Ulsrud 🔨	0	1	0	1	0	2	0	0	4
(Ontario) Glenn Howard	0	0	2	0	2	0	0	1	5

Sheet E	1	2	3	4	5	6	7	8	Final
(Switzerland) Sven Michel 🔨	0	0	1	0	2	1	1	1	6
(Switzerland) Peter de Cruz	1	0	0	1	0	0	0	0	2

==== Draw 4 ====
Wednesday, October 29, 4:30 pm

Sheet A	1	2	3	4	5	6	7	8	Final
(Alberta) Kevin Koe	1	0	3	0	2	0	6	X	12
(British Columbia) Jim Cotter 🔨	0	1	0	2	0	2	0	X	5

Sheet B	1	2	3	4	5	6	7	8	Final
(Manitoba) Mike McEwen 🔨	2	3	0	3	0	2	X	X	10
(Scotland) David Murdoch	0	0	1	0	2	0	X	X	3

==== Draw 5 ====
Wednesday, October 29, 7:30 pm

Sheet A	1	2	3	4	5	6	7	8	Final
(Newfoundland and Labrador) Brad Gushue 🔨	1	0	2	0	1	0	2	X	6
(Norway) Thomas Ulsrud	0	1	0	1	0	2	0	X	4

Sheet B	1	2	3	4	5	6	7	8	Final
(Alberta) John Morris 🔨	3	0	2	0	1	0	0	0	6
(Switzerland) Peter de Cruz	0	1	0	1	0	0	2	1	5

Sheet C	1	2	3	4	5	6	7	8	Final
(Ontario) John Epping	1	1	0	0	2	1	0	0	5
(Manitoba) Jeff Stoughton 🔨	0	0	0	1	0	0	2	1	4

Sheet D	1	2	3	4	5	6	7	8	Final
(Ontario) Brad Jacobs	0	0	1	0	X	X	X	X	1
(Saskatchewan) Steve Laycock 🔨	2	3	0	3	X	X	X	X	8

==== Draw 7 ====
Thursday, October 30, 12:30 pm

Sheet A	1	2	3	4	5	6	7	8	Final
(Manitoba) Mike McEwen	0	0	0	1	0	1	0	2	4
(Switzerland) Sven Michel 🔨	0	1	0	0	1	0	1	0	3

Sheet B	1	2	3	4	5	6	7	8	Final
(British Columbia) Jim Cotter 🔨	0	1	0	2	0	1	1	0	5
(Saskatchewan) Steve Laycock	0	0	2	0	2	0	0	2	6

Sheet C	1	2	3	4	5	6	7	8	Final
(Newfoundland and Labrador) Brad Gushue 🔨	2	0	1	0	0	1	1	X	5
(Ontario) Glenn Howard	0	1	0	1	0	0	0	X	2

Sheet D	1	2	3	4	5	6	7	8	Final
(Sweden) Niklas Edin	0	2	0	3	2	0	X	X	7
(Alberta) Kevin Koe 🔨	1	0	1	0	0	1	0	X	3

Sheet E	1	2	3	4	5	6	7	8	Final
(Alberta) John Morris 🔨	0	0	2	1	1	0	2	0	6
(Scotland) David Murdoch	1	2	0	0	0	2	0	2	7

==== Draw 8 ====
Thursday, October 30, 4:00 pm

Sheet E	1	2	3	4	5	6	7	8	Final
(Ontario) John Epping 🔨	0	1	0	1	0	3	0	0	5
(Norway) Thomas Ulsrud	1	0	1	0	1	0	1	0	4

==== Draw 9 ====
Thursday, October 30, 7:30 pm

Sheet A	1	2	3	4	5	6	7	8	Final
(Ontario) Glenn Howard 🔨	2	0	2	1	1	0	1	X	7
(Manitoba) Jeff Stoughton	0	1	0	0	0	2	0	X	3

Sheet C	1	2	3	4	5	6	7	8	Final
(Ontario) Brad Jacobs	0	2	0	1	0	2	0	0	5
(Alberta) Kevin Koe 🔨	2	0	0	0	2	0	1	3	8

Sheet D	1	2	3	4	5	6	7	8	Final
(Manitoba) Mike McEwen	1	0	2	0	1	1	1	X	6
(Switzerland) Peter de Cruz 🔨	0	2	0	1	0	0	0	X	3

Sheet E	1	2	3	4	5	6	7	8	Final
(Sweden) Niklas Edin 🔨	0	2	0	0	3	0	0	1	6
(British Columbia) Jim Cotter	0	0	2	1	0	1	1	0	5

==== Draw 10 ====
Friday, October 31, 9:00 am

Sheet B	1	2	3	4	5	6	7	8	Final
(Newfoundland and Labrador) Brad Gushue	0	0	2	1	0	4	X	X	7
(Ontario) John Epping 🔨	1	1	0	0	1	0	X	X	3

Sheet D	1	2	3	4	5	6	7	8	Final
(Alberta) John Morris 🔨	0	0	0	1	2	0	2	0	5
(Switzerland) Sven Michel	0	2	0	0	0	3	0	1	6

==== Draw 11 ====
Friday, October 31, 12:30 pm

Sheet A	1	2	3	4	5	6	7	8	Final
(Scotland) David Murdoch	0	1	0	1	0	X	X	X	2
(Switzerland) Peter de Cruz 🔨	2	0	1	0	4	X	X	X	7

Sheet D	1	2	3	4	5	6	7	8	Final
(Ontario) Brad Jacobs 🔨	1	0	1	4	2	X	X	X	8
(British Columbia) Jim Cotter	0	1	0	0	0	X	X	X	1

==== Draw 12 ====
Friday, October 31, 4:00 pm

Sheet B	1	2	3	4	5	6	7	8	Final
(Ontario) Glenn Howard 🔨	2	1	0	1	0	1	0	0	5
(Ontario) John Epping	0	0	3	0	2	0	0	1	6

Sheet C	1	2	3	4	5	6	7	8	Final
(Manitoba) Mike McEwen 🔨	0	2	0	1	0	0	0	X	3
(Alberta) John Morris	1	0	1	0	1	1	1	X	5

Sheet D	1	2	3	4	5	6	7	8	Final
(Norway) Thomas Ulsrud 🔨	2	0	1	0	2	0	0	X	5
(Manitoba) Jeff Stoughton	0	3	0	2	0	2	1	X	8

==== Draw 13 ====
Friday, October 31, 7:30 pm

Sheet B	1	2	3	4	5	6	7	8	9	Final
(Ontario) Brad Jacobs	1	0	3	0	2	0	0	0	1	7
(Sweden) Niklas Edin 🔨	0	1	0	2	0	1	1	1	0	6

Sheet E	1	2	3	4	5	6	7	8	Final
(Alberta) Kevin Koe	1	2	1	0	1	5	X	X	10
(Saskatchewan) Steve Laycock 🔨	0	0	0	1	0	0	X	X	1

=== Tiebreakers ===
==== Round 1 ====
Saturday, November 1, 8:30 am

Team	1	2	3	4	5	6	7	8	Final
(Manitoba) Jeff Stoughton	0	2	0	2	1	0	0	1	6
(Alberta) John Morris 🔨	1	0	1	0	0	1	1	0	4

Player percentages
(Manitoba) Team Stoughton		(Alberta) Team Morris	
Connor Njegovan	90%	Nolan Thiessen	91%
Alex Forrest	96%	Scott Bailey	76%
Rob Fowler	99%	Pat Simmons	89%
Jeff Stoughton	83%	John Morris	83%
Total	92%	Total	85%

==== Round 2 ====
Saturday, November 1, 12:30 pm

Team	1	2	3	4	5	6	7	8	Final
(Sweden) Niklas Edin	0	1	1	1	0	1	0	X	4
(Manitoba) Jeff Stoughton 🔨	2	0	0	0	2	0	5	X	9

Player percentages
(Sweden) Team Edin		(Manitoba) Team Stoughton	
Christoffer Sundgren	84%	Connor Njegovan	84%
Kristian Lindström	80%	Alex Forrest	93%
Oskar Eriksson	73%	Rob Fowler	92%
Niklas Edin	81%	Jeff Stoughton	89%
Total	79%	Total	89%

Saturday, November 1, 8:30 am

Team	1	2	3	4	5	6	7	8	Final
(Ontario) Glenn Howard 🔨	0	1	0	1	0	0	0	0	2
(Ontario) Brad Jacobs	0	0	1	0	0	2	1	2	6

Player percentages
(Ontario) Team Howard		(Ontario) Team Jacobs	
Craig Savill	98%	Ryan Harnden	91%
Jon Mead	97%	E. J. Harnden	94%
Richard Hart	97%	Ryan Fry	99%
Glenn Howard	86%	Brad Jacobs	94%
Total	95%	Total	95%

=== Playoffs ===
Quarterfinals
(Newfoundland and Labrador) Brad Gushue	5
(Manitoba) Jeff Stoughton	4
(Ontario) John Epping	5
(Switzerland) Sven Michel	4
(Alberta) Kevin Koe	4
(Ontario) Brad Jacobs	5
(Saskatchewan) Steve Laycock	3
(Manitoba) Mike McEwen	'9

Semifinals
(Newfoundland and Labrador) Brad Gushue	6
(Ontario) John Epping	5
(Ontario) Brad Jacobs	2
(Manitoba) Mike McEwen	7

Final
(Newfoundland and Labrador) Brad Gushue	8
(Manitoba) Mike McEwen	6

==== Quarterfinals ====
Saturday, November 1, 3:30 pm

Team	1	2	3	4	5	6	7	8	Final
(Newfoundland and Labrador) Brad Gushue 🔨	0	3	0	0	1	0	0	1	5
(Manitoba) Jeff Stoughton	0	0	0	2	0	0	2	0	4

Player percentages
(Newfoundland and Labrador) Team Gushue		(Manitoba) Team Stoughton	
Geoff Walker	87%	Connor Njegovan	94%
Brett Gallant	75%	Alex Forrest	89%
Mark Nichols	90%	Rob Fowler	95%
Brad Gushue	87%	Jeff Stoughton	87%
Total	83%	Total	91%

Team	1	2	3	4	5	6	7	8	Final
(Ontario) John Epping 🔨	2	0	1	0	1	1	0	0	5
(Switzerland) Sven Michel	0	1	0	1	0	0	1	1	4

Player percentages
(Ontario) Team Epping		(Switzerland) Team Michel	
Tim March	90%	Stefan Meienberg	91%
Patrick Janssen	97%	Simon Gempeler	86%
Travis Fanset	91%	Florian Meister	66%
John Epping	79%	Sven Michel	76%
Total	89%	Total	80%

Team	1	2	3	4	5	6	7	8	Final
(Alberta) Kevin Koe 🔨	0	0	1	0	1	0	2	0	4
(Ontario) Brad Jacobs	0	1	0	1	0	1	0	2	5

Player percentages
(Alberta) Team Koe		(Ontario) Team Jacobs	
Ben Hebert	93%	Ryan Harnden	89%
Brent Laing	88%	E. J. Harnden	97%
Marc Kennedy	96%	Ryan Fry	91%
Kevin Koe	90%	Brad Jacobs	93%
Total	92%	Total	93%

Team	1	2	3	4	5	6	7	8	Final
(Saskatchewan) Steve Laycock 🔨	1	0	0	1	0	1	0	X	3
(Manitoba) Mike McEwen	0	3	1	0	2	0	3	X	9

Player percentages
(Saskatchewan) Team Laycock		(Manitoba) Team McEwen	
Dallan Muyres	96%	Denni Neufeld	91%
Colton Flasch	96%	Matt Wozniak	89%
Kirk Muyres	75%	B. J. Neufeld	91%
Steve Laycock	61%	Mike McEwen	82%
Total	82%	Total	88%

==== Semifinals ====
Saturday, November 1, 9:00 pm

Team	1	2	3	4	5	6	7	8	9	Final
(Newfoundland and Labrador) Brad Gushue	0	2	0	1	1	1	0	0	1	6
(Ontario) John Epping 🔨	2	0	1	0	0	0	1	1	0	5

Player percentages
(Newfoundland and Labrador) Team Gushue		(Ontario) Team Epping	
Geoff Walker	88%	Tim March	89%
Brett Gallant	75%	Patrick Janssen	92%
Mark Nichols	81%	Travis Fanset	87%
Brad Gushue	76%	John Epping	59%
Total	80%	Total	82%

Team	1	2	3	4	5	6	7	8	Final
(Ontario) Brad Jacobs	1	0	1	0	0	X	X	X	2
(Manitoba) Mike McEwen 🔨	0	4	0	3	0	X	X	X	7

Player percentages
(Ontario) Team Jacobs		(Manitoba) Team McEwen	
Ryan Harnden	97%	Denni Neufeld	91%
E. J. Harnden	89%	Matt Wozniak	96%
Ryan Fry	93%	B. J. Neufeld	95%
Brad Jacobs	86%	Mike McEwen	93%
Total	91%	Total	94%

==== Final ====
Sunday, November 2, 2:00 pm

Sheet C	1	2	3	4	5	6	7	8	Final
(Newfoundland and Labrador) Brad Gushue 🔨	0	0	2	0	4	0	2	X	8
(Manitoba) Mike McEwen	0	1	0	1	0	4	0	X	6

Player percentages
(Newfoundland and Labrador) Team Gushue		(Manitoba) Team McEwen	
Geoff Walker	96%	Denni Neufeld	98%
Brett Gallant	81%	Matt Wozniak	78%
Mark Nichols	79%	B. J. Neufeld	80%
Brad Gushue	75%	Mike McEwen	80%
Total	83%	Total	84%

== Women ==
=== Teams ===
The teams are listed as follows:

Skip	Third	Second	Lead	Locale
Sherry Anderson	Sherri Singler	Ashley Howard	Stephanie Schmidt	Saskatoon, Saskatchewan
Chelsea Carey	Laura Crocker	Taylor McDonald	Jen Gates	Edmonton, Alberta
Binia Feltscher	Irene Schori	Franziska Kaufmann	Christine Urech	Flims, Switzerland
Allison Flaxey	Katie Cottrill	Kristen Foster	Morgan Court	Listowel, Ontario
Rachel Homan	Emma Miskew	Joanne Courtney	Lisa Weagle	Ottawa, Ontario
Jennifer Jones	Kaitlyn Lawes	Jill Officer	Dawn McEwen	Winnipeg, Manitoba
Kristy McDonald	Kate Cameron	Leslie Wilson-Westcott	Raunora Westcott	Winnipeg, Manitoba
Sherry Middaugh	Jo-Ann Rizzo	Lee Merklinger	Leigh Armstrong	Coldwater, Ontario
Eve Muirhead	Anna Sloan	Vicki Adams	Sarah Reid	Stirling, Scotland
Heather Nedohin	Amy Nixon	Jocelyn Peterman	Laine Peters	Edmonton, Alberta
Alina Pätz	Nadine Lehmann	Marisa Winkelhausen	Nicole Schwägli	Baden, Switzerland
Anna Sidorova	Margarita Fomina	Alexandra Saitova	Ekaterina Galkina	Moscow, Russia
Maria Prytz (fourth)	Christina Bertrup	Maria Wennerström	Margaretha Sigfridsson (skip)	Skellefteå, Sweden
Valerie Sweeting	Cathy Overton-Clapham	Dana Ferguson	Rachelle Brown	Edmonton, Alberta
Silvana Tirinzoni	Manuela Siegrist	Esther Neuenschwander	Marlene Albrecht	Aarau, Switzerland

=== Round-robin standings ===
Final round-robin standings

Key
Teams to Playoffs
Teams to Tiebreakers

Pool A	W	L
(Ontario) Rachel Homan	3	1
(Ontario) Sherry Middaugh	2	2
(Switzerland) Alina Pätz	2	2
(Switzerland) Silvana Tirinzoni	2	2
(Alberta) Chelsea Carey	1	3

Pool B	W	L
(Manitoba) Jennifer Jones	3	1
(Alberta) Valerie Sweeting	3	1
(Russia) Anna Sidorova	2	2
(Alberta) Heather Nedohin	1	3
(Ontario) Allison Flaxey	1	3

Pool C	W	L
(Switzerland) Binia Feltscher	4	0
(Manitoba) Kristy McDonald	2	2
(Sweden) Margaretha Sigfridsson	2	2
(Scotland) Eve Muirhead	1	3
(Saskatchewan) Sherry Anderson	1	3

=== Round-robin results ===
The draw is listed as follows:

==== Draw 1 ====
Tuesday, October 28, 7:00 pm

Sheet A	1	2	3	4	5	6	7	8	Final
(Ontario) Sherry Middaugh 🔨	1	1	0	1	0	3	0	3	9
(Switzerland) Alina Pätz	0	0	3	0	1	0	2	0	6

Sheet B	1	2	3	4	5	6	7	8	Final
(Manitoba) Jennifer Jones	0	0	0	0	0	1	0	X	1
(Ontario) Allison Flaxey 🔨	1	1	1	1	1	0	1	X	6

Sheet C	1	2	3	4	5	6	7	8	9	Final
(Scotland) Eve Muirhead	0	0	2	0	1	0	2	1	0	6
(Manitoba) Kristy McDonald 🔨	1	2	0	2	0	1	0	0	2	8

==== Draw 2 ====
Wednesday, October 29, 9:00 am

Sheet A	1	2	3	4	5	6	7	8	Final
(Switzerland) Silvana Tirinzoni	0	1	0	0	0	1	1	0	3
(Alberta) Chelsea Carey 🔨	1	0	2	1	0	0	0	2	6

Sheet B	1	2	3	4	5	6	7	8	Final
(Alberta) Valerie Sweeting	0	2	0	0	2	0	2	1	7
(Alberta) Heather Nedohin 🔨	1	0	1	0	0	2	0	0	4

Sheet D	1	2	3	4	5	6	7	8	Final
(Switzerland) Binia Feltscher	0	1	2	0	1	0	1	X	5
(Saskatchewan) Sherry Anderson 🔨	1	0	0	1	0	1	0	X	3

==== Draw 3 ====
Wednesday, October 29, 12:30 pm

Sheet A	1	2	3	4	5	6	7	8	Final
(Russia) Anna Sidorova	0	1	0	2	0	1	2	X	6
(Ontario) Allison Flaxey 🔨	1	0	1	0	1	0	0	X	3

Sheet B	1	2	3	4	5	6	7	8	9	Final
(Ontario) Rachel Homan 🔨	0	0	0	1	1	0	2	1	2	7
(Switzerland) Alina Pätz	0	2	2	0	0	1	0	0	0	5

==== Draw 4 ====
Wednesday, October 29, 4:30 pm

Sheet C	1	2	3	4	5	6	7	8	Final
(Switzerland) Silvana Tirinzoni	0	1	0	1	0	3	0	1	6
(Ontario) Sherry Middaugh 🔨	1	0	1	0	1	0	2	0	5

Sheet D	1	2	3	4	5	6	7	8	Final
(Sweden) Margaretha Sigfridsson	3	2	1	0	4	X	X	X	10
(Manitoba) Kristy McDonald 🔨	0	0	0	2	0	X	X	X	2

Sheet E	1	2	3	4	5	6	7	8	Final
(Scotland) Eve Muirhead	1	1	0	0	2	0	2	0	6
(Switzerland) Binia Feltscher 🔨	0	0	1	4	0	1	0	1	7

==== Draw 5 ====
Wednesday, October 29, 7:30 pm

Sheet E	1	2	3	4	5	6	7	8	Final
(Manitoba) Jennifer Jones	3	2	0	0	2	0	4	X	11
(Alberta) Heather Nedohin 🔨	0	0	2	0	0	1	0	X	3

==== Draw 6 ====
Thursday, October 30, 9:00 am

Sheet B	1	2	3	4	5	6	7	8	Final
(Ontario) Rachel Homan	0	0	1	2	0	2	0	2	7
(Ontario) Sherry Middaugh 🔨	1	1	0	0	1	0	1	0	4

Sheet C	1	2	3	4	5	6	7	8	9	Final
(Sweden) Margaretha Sigfridsson 🔨	1	0	0	0	1	0	2	1	0	5
(Saskatchewan) Sherry Anderson	0	2	1	1	0	1	0	0	1	6

Sheet D	1	2	3	4	5	6	7	8	Final
(Alberta) Heather Nedohin 🔨	0	0	0	1	1	0	0	1	3
(Ontario) Allison Flaxey	0	0	0	0	0	1	1	0	2

Sheet E	1	2	3	4	5	6	7	8	Final
(Russia) Anna Sidorova	0	1	0	3	0	0	0	0	4
(Alberta) Valerie Sweeting 🔨	1	0	2	0	2	1	0	1	7

==== Draw 8 ====
Thursday, October 30, 4:00 pm

Sheet A	1	2	3	4	5	6	7	8	Final
(Switzerland) Binia Feltscher 🔨	0	0	2	0	2	0	0	2	6
(Manitoba) Kristy McDonald	1	1	0	1	0	2	0	0	5

Sheet B	1	2	3	4	5	6	7	8	Final
(Switzerland) Alina Pätz 🔨	2	0	1	2	1	1	1	X	8
(Alberta) Chelsea Carey	0	3	0	0	0	0	0	X	3

Sheet C	1	2	3	4	5	6	7	8	Final
(Manitoba) Jennifer Jones 🔨	0	3	0	1	1	0	2	X	7
(Alberta) Valerie Sweeting	0	0	1	0	0	2	0	X	3

Sheet D	1	2	3	4	5	6	7	8	Final
(Ontario) Rachel Homan	1	1	0	3	0	0	0	X	5
(Switzerland) Silvana Tirinzoni 🔨	0	0	1	0	1	2	4	X	8

==== Draw 9 ====
Thursday, October 30, 7:30 pm

Sheet B	1	2	3	4	5	6	7	8	Final
(Sweden) Margaretha Sigfridsson 🔨	2	0	2	0	1	0	2	X	7
(Scotland) Eve Muirhead	0	1	0	1	0	1	0	X	3

==== Draw 10 ====
Friday, October 31, 9:00 am

Sheet C	1	2	3	4	5	6	7	8	Final
(Alberta) Valerie Sweeting 🔨	0	3	0	3	0	1	2	X	9
(Ontario) Allison Flaxey	0	0	1	0	2	0	0	X	3

==== Draw 11 ====
Friday, October 31, 12:30 pm

Sheet B	1	2	3	4	5	6	7	8	Final
(Saskatchewan) Sherry Anderson	0	0	0	0	1	0	1	X	2
(Manitoba) Kristy McDonald	0	1	1	2	0	1	0	X	5

Sheet C	1	2	3	4	5	6	7	8	Final
(Russia) Anna Sidorova	3	0	1	0	0	4	0	X	8
(Alberta) Heather Nedohin	0	2	0	1	1	0	1	X	5

Sheet E	1	2	3	4	5	6	7	8	Final
(Ontario) Sherry Middaugh	0	1	0	1	0	0	3	1	6
(Alberta) Chelsea Carey	2	0	1	0	0	2	0	0	5

==== Draw 12 ====
Friday, October 31, 4:00 pm

Sheet A	1	2	3	4	5	6	7	8	Final
(Sweden) Margaretha Sigfridsson	0	0	2	0	1	0	1	0	4
(Switzerland) Binia Feltscher 🔨	1	1	0	0	0	2	0	1	5

Sheet E	1	2	3	4	5	6	7	8	Final
(Switzerland) Silvana Tirinzoni 🔨	1	0	0	2	1	0	1	X	5
(Switzerland) Alina Pätz	0	6	1	0	0	2	0	X	9

==== Draw 13 ====
Friday, October 31, 7:30 pm

Sheet A	1	2	3	4	5	6	7	8	Final
(Scotland) Eve Muirhead	0	0	0	2	0	1	2	1	6
(Saskatchewan) Sherry Anderson 🔨	0	2	0	0	2	0	0	0	4

Sheet C	1	2	3	4	5	6	7	8	Final
(Ontario) Rachel Homan 🔨	0	1	0	0	2	0	2	X	5
(Alberta) Chelsea Carey	0	0	0	0	0	1	0	X	1

Sheet D	1	2	3	4	5	6	7	8	Final
(Manitoba) Jennifer Jones	1	0	2	2	1	0	0	X	6
(Russia) Anna Sidorova 🔨	0	1	0	0	0	2	1	X	4

=== Tiebreakers ===
Saturday, November 1, 8:30 am

Team	1	2	3	4	5	6	7	8	Final
(Switzerland) Silvana Tirinzoni 🔨	0	0	1	0	1	0	0	1	3
(Manitoba) Kristy McDonald	0	0	0	1	0	1	0	0	2

Player percentages
(Switzerland) Team Tirinzoni		(Manitoba) Team McDonald	
Marlene Albrecht	94%	Raunora Westcott	88%
Esther Neuenschwander	91%	Leslie Wilson-Westcott	83%
Manuela Siegrist	90%	Kate Cameron	72%
Silvana Tirinzoni	88%	Kristy McDonald	66%
Total	91%	Total	78%

Team	1	2	3	4	5	6	7	8	Final
(Sweden) Margaretha Sigfridsson 🔨	1	0	0	3	0	1	1	X	6
(Russia) Anna Sidorova	0	1	1	0	2	0	0	X	4

Player percentages
(Sweden) Team Sigfridsson		(Russia) Team Sidorova	
Margaretha Sigfridsson	92%	Ekaterina Galkina	87%
Maria Wennerström	78%	Alexandra Saitova	88%
Christina Bertrup	80%	Margarita Fomina	69%
Maria Prytz	82%	Anna Sidorova	76%
Total	83%	Total	80%

=== Playoffs ===
Quarterfinals
(Switzerland) Binia Feltscher	4
(Sweden) Margaretha Sigfridsson	8
(Manitoba) Jennifer Jones	6
(Ontario) Sherry Middaugh	5
(Ontario) Rachel Homan	8
(Switzerland) Silvana Tirinzoni	3
(Alberta) Valerie Sweeting	5
(Switzerland) Alina Pätz	2

Semifinals
(Sweden) Margaretha Sigfridsson	5
(Manitoba) Jennifer Jones	4
(Ontario) Rachel Homan	3
(Alberta) Valerie Sweeting	4

Final
(Sweden) Margaretha Sigfridsson	4
(Alberta) Valerie Sweeting	5

==== Quarterfinals ====
Saturday, November 1, 12:00 pm

Team	1	2	3	4	5	6	7	8	Final
(Switzerland) Binia Feltscher 🔨	2	0	0	2	0	0	0	X	4
(Sweden) Margaretha Sigfridsson	0	3	1	0	2	1	1	X	8

Player percentages
(Switzerland) Team Feltscher		(Sweden) Team Sigfridsson	
Christine Urech	79%	Margaretha Sigfridsson	92%
Franziska Kaufmann	92%	Maria Wennerström	85%
Irene Schori	68%	Christina Bertrup	66%
Binia Feltscher	59%	Maria Prytz	84%
Total	75%	Total	82%

Team	1	2	3	4	5	6	7	8	Final
(Manitoba) Jennifer Jones 🔨	0	0	2	0	2	0	0	2	6
(Ontario) Sherry Middaugh	0	1	0	1	0	3	0	0	5

Player percentages
(Manitoba) Team Jones		(Ontario) Team Middaugh	
Dawn McEwen	95%	Leigh Armstrong	98%
Jill Officer	76%	Lee Merklinger	80%
Kaitlyn Lawes	81%	Jo-Ann Rizzo	98%
Jennifer Jones	72%	Sherry Middaugh	74%
Total	81%	Total	87%

Team	1	2	3	4	5	6	7	8	Final
(Ontario) Rachel Homan 🔨	1	0	3	0	1	0	3	X	8
(Switzerland) Silvana Tirinzoni	0	0	0	1	0	2	0	X	3

Player percentages
(Ontario) Team Homan		(Switzerland) Team Tirinzoni	
Lisa Weagle	100%	Marlene Albrecht	82%
Joanne Courtney	88%	Esther Neuenschwander	79%
Emma Miskew	79%	Manuela Siegrist	83%
Rachel Homan	89%	Silvana Tirinzoni	83%
Total	89%	Total	82%

Team	1	2	3	4	5	6	7	8	Final
(Alberta) Valerie Sweeting 🔨	2	0	0	1	0	1	1	X	5
(Switzerland) Alina Pätz	0	1	1	0	0	0	0	X	2

Player percentages
(Alberta) Team Sweeting		(Switzerland) Team Pätz	
Rachelle Brown	73%	Nicole Schwägli	84%
Dana Ferguson	75%	Marisa Winkelhausen	77%
Cathy Overton-Clapham	65%	Nadine Lehmann	72%
Valerie Sweeting	81%	Alina Pätz	52%
Total	74%	Total	72%

==== Semifinals ====
Saturday, November 1, 9:00 pm

Team	1	2	3	4	5	6	7	8	Final
(Sweden) Margaretha Sigfridsson	0	0	1	1	0	2	0	1	5
(Manitoba) Jennifer Jones 🔨	0	1	0	0	2	0	1	0	4

Player percentages
(Sweden) Team Sigfridsson		(Manitoba) Team Jones	
Margaretha Sigfridsson	95%	Dawn McEwen	96%
Maria Wennerström	92%	Jill Officer	74%
Christina Bertrup	82%	Kaitlyn Lawes	79%
Maria Prytz	85%	Jennifer Jones	76%
Total	89%	Total	81%

Team	1	2	3	4	5	6	7	8	9	Final
(Ontario) Rachel Homan 🔨	0	1	0	0	1	0	0	1	0	3
(Alberta) Valerie Sweeting	0	0	1	0	0	1	1	0	1	4

Player percentages
(Ontario) Team Homan		(Alberta) Team Sweeting	
Lisa Weagle	77%	Rachelle Brown	88%
Joanne Courtney	84%	Dana Ferguson	77%
Emma Miskew	75%	Cathy Overton-Clapham	73%
Rachel Homan	78%	Valerie Sweeting	71%
Total	79%	Total	77%

==== Final ====
Sunday, November 2, 11:00 am

Sheet C	1	2	3	4	5	6	7	8	Final
(Sweden) Margaretha Sigfridsson	0	1	1	0	0	0	2	0	4
(Alberta) Valerie Sweeting 🔨	1	0	0	2	0	1	0	1	5

Player percentages
(Sweden) Team Sigfridsson		(Alberta) Team Sweeting	
Margaretha Sigfridsson	83%	Rachelle Brown	76%
Maria Wennerström	70%	Dana Ferguson	80%
Christina Bertrup	83%	Cathy Overton-Clapham	64%
Maria Prytz	77%	Valerie Sweeting	84%
Total	78%	Total	76%
