= International Bernese Ladies Cup =

World Curling Tour event

- Established: 1968
- Host city: Bern, Switzerland
- Arena: Curling Bern
- Purse: CHF 20,000
- 2026 champion: (Switzerland) Silvana Tirinzoni

Current edition
- 2026 International Bernese Ladies Cup

The International Bernese Ladies Cup (Swiss German: Internationaler Berner Damen Cup) is an annual bonspiel which was started in 1968 and became an event on the women's World Curling Tour in 2007. It is held every January at the Curlingbahn Allmend in Bern, Switzerland.

== Champions (1968–2006) ==
Year	Winning skip
1968	(Switzerland) H. Leuenberger
1969	(Switzerland) V. Flückiger
1970	(Switzerland) R. de Grenus
1979	(Switzerland) Ameli Fischer
1980	(Germany) Halga Philips
1982	(Switzerland) Dorli Broger
1983	(Switzerland) Laurence Burkhalter
1984	(Switzerland) Erika Müller
1985	(Germany) Almut Hege
1986	(Canada) Linda Moore
1989	(Canada) Heather Houston
1990	(Switzerland) Cristina Lestander
1991	(Scotland) Carolyn Hutchison
1992	(Switzerland) Graziella Grichting
1993	(Switzerland) Marianne Flotron
1994	(Canada) Sandra Peterson
1995	(Switzerland) Mirjam Ott
1996	(Sweden) Anette Norberg
1997	(Switzerland) Luzia Ebnöther
1998	(Sweden) Elisabet Gustafson
1999	(Sweden) Elisabet Gustafson
2000	(Sweden) Maria Engholm
2001	(Canada) Kelley Law
2002	(Canada) Colleen Jones
2003	(Scotland) Rhona Martin
2004	(Switzerland) Luzia Ebnöther
2005	(Switzerland) Mirjam Ott
2006	(Canada) Jennifer Jones

== Past champions (since 2007) ==
Year	Winning team	Runner up team	Purse (CHF)
2007	(Sweden) Anette Norberg, Eva Lund, Cathrine Lindahl, Anna Le Moine	(Sweden) Anna Hasselborg, Zandra Flyg, Agnes Knochenhauer, Sabina Kraupp	20,000
2008	(Canada) Kelly Scott, Jeanna Schraeder, Sasha Carter, Renee Simons	(Scotland) Kelly Wood	20,000
2009	(Canada) Shannon Kleibrink, Amy Nixon, Bronwen Webster, Chelsey Bell	(Germany) Andrea Schöpp, Melanie Robillard, Monika Wagner, Corinna Scholz	
2010	(Canada) Jennifer Jones, Kaitlyn Lawes, Jill Officer, Dawn Askin	(Japan) Moe Meguro, Anna Ohmiya, Mari Motohashi, Kotomi Ishizaki	
2011	(Denmark) Lene Nielsen, Helle Simonsen, Jeanne Ellegaard, Maria Poulsen	(Japan) Mayo Yamaura, Shinobu Aota, Anna Ohmiya, Kotomi Ishizaki	
2012	(Switzerland) Michèle Jäggi, Marisa Winkelhausen, Stéphanie Jäggi, Nicole Schwägli	(Canada) Jennifer Jones, Kaitlyn Lawes, Jill Officer, Dawn Askin	20,000
2013	(Switzerland) Silvana Tirinzoni, Marlene Albrecht, Courtney Davies, Sandra Gantenbein	(Denmark) Lene Nielsen, Helle Simonsen, Jeanne Ellegaard, Maria Poulsen	20,000
2014	(Scotland) Eve Muirhead, Anna Sloan, Vicki Adams, Claire Hamilton	(Russia) Anna Sidorova, Margarita Fomina, Alexandra Saitova, Ekaterina Galkina	20,500
2015	(Switzerland) Alina Pätz, Nadine Lehmann, Marisa Winkelhausen, Nicole Schwägli	(Switzerland) Silvana Tirinzoni, Manuela Siegrist, Esther Neuenschwander, Marlene Albrecht	20,500
2016	(Switzerland) Silvana Tirinzoni, Manuela Siegrist, Esther Neuenschwander, Marlene Albrecht	(Sweden) Maria Prytz (Fourth), Christina Bertrup, Maria Wennerström, Margaretha Sigfridsson (Skip)	20,500
2017	(Switzerland) Alina Pätz, Nadine Lehmann, Marisa Winkelhausen, Nicole Schwägli	(Switzerland) Silvana Tirinzoni, Manuela Siegrist, Esther Neuenschwander, Marlene Albrecht	20,500
2018	(China) Wang Bingyu, Zhou Yan, Liu Jinli, Ma Jingyi	(United States) Jamie Sinclair, Alex Carlson, Vicky Persinger, Monica Walker	20,500
2019	(Russia) Anna Sidorova, Margarita Fomina, Yulia Portunova, Julia Guzieva	(China) Jiang Yilun, Zhang Lijun, Dong Ziqi, Jiang Xindi	21,500
2020	(Switzerland) Briar Hürlimann (Fourth), Elena Stern (Skip), Lisa Gisler, Céline Koller	(China) Han Yu, Zhang Lijun, Jiang Xindi, Zhao Ruiyi	21,500
2021	Cancelled		
2022	(Switzerland) Selina Witschonke (Fourth), Elena Mathis, Raphaela Keiser (Skip), Martina Lörtscher	(Germany) Daniela Jentsch, Emira Abbes, Mia Höhne, Analena Jentsch	12,000
2023	(Switzerland) Alina Pätz (Fourth), Silvana Tirinzoni (Skip), Carole Howald, Briar Schwaller-Hürlimann	(Sweden) Isabella Wranå, Almida de Val, Maria Larsson, Linda Stenlund	18,200
2024	(South Korea) Gim Eun-ji, Kim Min-ji, Seol Ye-ji, Seol Ye-eun, Kim Su-ji	(South Korea) Kim Eun-jung, Kim Kyeong-ae, Kim Cho-hi, Kim Seon-yeong, Kim Yeong-mi	20,000
2025	(Switzerland) Alina Pätz (Fourth), Silvana Tirinzoni (Skip), Carole Howald, Selina Witschonke	(Switzerland) Xenia Schwaller, Selina Gafner, Fabienne Rieder, Selina Rychiger	20,000
2026	(Switzerland) Alina Pätz (Fourth), Silvana Tirinzoni (Skip), Carole Howald, Selina Witschonke	(Sweden) Almida de Val, Moa Dryburgh, Maria Larsson, Linda Stenlund	20,000
