= 2017 Stockholm Ladies Cup =

World Curling Tour event

2017 Stockholm Ladies Curling Cup
- Host city: Stockholm, Sweden
- Arena: Danderyd Curling Arena
- Dates: September 28–31
- Winner: (Switzerland) Alina Pätz
- Curling club: Baden Regio-Privera CC, Baden, Switzerland
- Skip: Alina Pätz
- Third: Nadine Lehmann
- Second: Marisa Winkelhausen
- Lead: Nicole Schwägli
- Finalist: (South Korea) Kim Eun-jung

The 2017 Stockholm Ladies Curling Cup was held from September 28 to 31 at the Danderyd Curling Arena in Stockholm, Sweden as part of the 2017–18 World Curling Tour. The event was held in a round robin format.

== Teams ==
The teams are listed as follows:

Skip	Third	Second	Lead	Locale
Cory Christensen	Sarah Anderson	Taylor Anderson	Jenna Martin	(United States) Blaine, Minnesota
Binia Feltscher	Irene Schori	Franziska Kaufmann	Carole Howald	Flims, Switzerland
Hannah Fleming	Jennifer Dodds	Alice Spence	Vicky Wright	Lockerbie, Scotland
Satsuki Fujisawa	Chinami Yoshida	Yumi Suzuki	Yurika Yoshida	Kitami, Japan
Anna Hasselborg	Sara McManus	Agnes Knochenhauer	Sofia Mabergs	Sundbyberg, Sweden
Ursi Hegner	Imogen Oona Lehmann	Nina Ledergerber	Claudia Baumann	Uzwil, Switzerland
Sophie Jackson	Naomi Brown	Mili Smith	Sophie Sinclair	Dumfries, Scotland
Daniela Jentsch	Josephine Obermann	Analena Jentsch	Pia-Lisa Schöll	Füssen, Germany
Jiang Yilun	Jiang Xindi	Yao Mingyue	Yan Hui	Harbin, China
Kim Eun-jung	Kim Kyeong-ae	Kim Seon-yeong	Kim Yeong-mi	(South Korea) Uiseong, Korea
Chiaki Matsumura	Emi Shimizu	Ikue Kitazawa	Hasumi Ishigooka	Karuizawa, Japan
Victoria Moiseeva	Uliana Vasilyeva	Galina Arsenkina	Julia Guzieva	Moscow, Russia
Anette Norberg	Therese Westman	Johanna Heldin	Sarah Pengel	Stocksund, Sweden
Ayumi Ogasawara	Yumie Funayama	Kaho Onodera	Anna Ohmiya	Sapporo, Japan
Alina Pätz	Nadine Lehmann	Marisa Winkelhausen	Nicole Schwägli	Zürich, Switzerland
Anna Sidorova	Margarita Fomina	Alexandra Raeva	Nkeirouka Ezekh	Moscow, Russia
Tova Sundberg	Emma Sjodin	Maria Larsson	Sofie Bergman	Östersund, Sweden
Silvana Tirinzoni	Manuela Siegrist	Esther Neuenschwander	Marlene Albrecht	Aarau, Switzerland
Wang Bingyu	Zhou Yan	Liu Jinli	Ma Jingyi	Harbin, China
Isabella Wranå	Jennie Wåhlin	Almida de Val	Fanny Sjöberg	Sundbyberg, Sweden

== Round Robin Standings ==
Pool A	W	L
(Sweden) Anna Hasselborg	4	0
(Switzerland) Binia Feltscher	2	2
(Japan) Ayumi Ogasawara	2	2
(China) Jiang Yilun	1	3
(Russia) Victoria Moiseeva	1	3

Pool B	W	L
(Switzerland) Alina Pätz	4	0
(United States) Cory Christensen	3	1
(Germany) Daniela Jentsch	1	3
(Sweden) Tova Sundberg	1	3
(Scotland) Hannah Fleming	1	3

Pool C	W	L
(Switzerland) Silvana Tirinzoni	4	0
(South Korea) Kim Eun-jung	3	1
(Japan) Satsuki Fujisawa	2	2
(Switzerland) Ursi Hegner	1	3
(Sweden) Anette Norberg	0	4

Pool D	W	L
(China) Wang Bingyu	3	1
(Russia) Anna Sidorova	3	1
(Scotland) Sophie Jackson	2	2
(Sweden) Isabella Wranå	2	2
(Japan) Chiaki Matsumura	0	4

== Playoffs ==
Quarterfinals
(Switzerland) Alina Pätz	6
(Scotland) Sophie Jackson	4
(United States) Cory Christensen	6
(China) Wang Bingyu	3
(Sweden) Anna Hasselborg	6
(Russia) Anna Sidorova	3
(Switzerland) Silvana Tirinzoni	4
(South Korea) Kim Eun-jung	6

Semifinals
(Switzerland) Alina Pätz	5
(United States) Cory Christensen	2
(Sweden) Anna Hasselborg	6
(South Korea) Kim Eun-jung	7

Final
(Switzerland) Alina Pätz	9
(South Korea) Kim Eun-jung	8
