= Lauren Gray =

Scottish curler

- Curler
- Born: 3 November 1991 (age 35); Glasgow, Scotland

Team
- Curling club: Balfron CC, Balfron, Scotland

Curling career
- Member Association: Scotland; Great Britain
- World Championship: 5 (2013, 2015, 2017, 2019, 2021)
- European Championship: 5 (2014, 2016, 2017, 2018, 2019)
- Olympic: 2 (2014, 2018)
Medal record
Women's curling
Representing Great Britain
Olympic Games
Bronze medal – third place	2014 Sochi
Winter Universiade
Gold medal – first place	2011 Erzurum
Representing Scotland
World Championships
Gold medal – first place	2013 Riga
Bronze medal – third place	2017 Beijing
European Championships
Gold medal – first place	2017 St Gallen
Silver medal – second place	2013 Stavanger
Silver medal – second place	2019 Helsingborg
Bronze medal – third place	2014 Champéry
Bronze medal – third place	2016 Braehead
Scottish Championships
Gold medal – first place	2017 Perth
Gold medal – first place	2020 Perth
Silver medal – second place	2016 Perth
Silver medal – second place	2019 Perth
World Junior Championships
Gold medal – first place	2012 Östersund
Silver medal – second place	2013 Sochi
Scottish Mixed Doubles Championship
Silver medal – second place	2014 Glasgow

Lauren Gray (born 3 November 1991) is a Scottish former curler from Stirling. As alternate for the Eve Muirhead rink, she won a gold medal at the 2013 World Championships for Scotland, and a bronze medal at the 2014 Winter Olympics for Great Britain. She became lead for Muirhead's team in 2016, and won a gold medal at the 2017 European Championships. In 2019, she was promoted to third on the team, but returned to playing lead in 2021. After a disappointing result in the 2021 World Championships, Gray was dropped from Eve Muirhead's team and replaced by Hailey Duff.

== Career ==
She competed for the British team at the 2014 Winter Olympics in Sochi where the team won the bronze medal. She had previously been part of the British rinks which won gold medals at the 2009 European Youth Olympic Winter Festival and the 2011 Winter Universiade, as well as the Scotland rinks which won the World Junior Curling Championships in 2012 and the World Curling Championships in 2013. Following the 2014 Olympics, Gray was part of the commentary team for Channel 4's coverage of the wheelchair curling tournament at the 2014 Winter Paralympics.

In May 2016, Gray became lead for Eve Muirhead's team, having previously been alternate for Muirhead's rink in their World Championship-winning campaign in 2013 and the Olympic tournament in 2014.

== Personal life ==
Gray was born in Glasgow and grew up in the village of Balfron where she attended Balfron Primary and then Balfron High School. She took up the sport at the age of eight.

Gray graduated from University of Glasgow with a 2:1 in English Literature and Politics in 2013, on the same day that she was formally selected for the 2014 Olympics.

She is the sister of curler Logan Gray.

== Teams ==
Season	Skip	Third	Second	Lead	Alternate
2008–09	Anna Sloan	Hannah Fleming	Lauren Gray	Alice Spence	Rebecca Kelsey
2009–10	Lauren Gray	Claire MacDonald	Tasha Aitken	Caitlin Barr	Anna Sloan
2010–11	Anna Sloan	Lauren Gray	Vicki Adams	Sarah McIntyre	Claire Hamilton
2011–12	Hannah Fleming	Lauren Gray	Alice Spence	Abigail Brown	Jennifer Martin
2012–13	Hannah Fleming	Lauren Gray	Jennifer Dodds	Abigail Brown	Vicky Wright
2013–14	Hannah Fleming	Lauren Gray	Jennifer Dodds	Alice Spence	Abigail Brown
2014–15	Lauren Gray	Jennifer Dodds	Vicky Wright	Mhairi Baird	
2015–16	Lauren Gray	Jennifer Dodds	Vicky Wright	Mhairi Baird	
2016–17	Eve Muirhead	Anna Sloan	Vicki Chalmers	Lauren Gray	
2017–18	Eve Muirhead	Anna Sloan	Vicki Chalmers	Lauren Gray	Kelly Schafer
2018–19	Eve Muirhead	Jennifer Dodds	Vicki Chalmers	Lauren Gray	Vicky Wright
2019–20	Eve Muirhead	Lauren Gray	Jennifer Dodds	Vicky Wright	
2020–21	Eve Muirhead	Vicky Wright	Jennifer Dodds	Lauren Gray	Sophie Sinclair
2021–22	Eve Muirhead	Vicky Wright	Jennifer Dodds	Lauren Gray	
