= Nicole Schwägli =

Swiss curler

- Curler
- Born: September 5, 1986 (age 40)

Team
- Curling club: CC Baden Regio, Baden, SUI

Curling career
- Member Association: Switzerland
- World Championship: 2 (2015, 2017)
- European Championship: 1 (2015)
Medal record
Women's curling
Representing Switzerland
World Curling Championships
| Gold medal – first place | 2015 Sapporo |
European Youth Olympic Winter Festival
| Gold medal – first place | 2005 Monthey |

Nicole "Nici" Schwägli (born September 5, 1986) is a Swiss curler from Rubigen. She is the former lead for the Alina Pätz rink and with this rink won the 2015 World Women's Curling Championship.

== Career ==
=== Juniors ===
Schwägli won a gold medal representing Switzerland at the 2005 European Youth Olympic Winter Festival, playing second for Michèle Jäggi. The team would represent Switzerland at the 2006 World Junior Curling Championships, where they would finish in fourth place overall. They would again represent Switzerland at the 2008 World Junior Curling Championships, finishing in sixth place.

=== Women's ===
Schwägli joined the newly formed Alina Pätz rink in 2013. Before this, she played lead for Michèle Jäggi and the team won the Kamloops Crown of Curling and the International Bernese Ladies Cup during the 2011–12 season. After a slow first season together, the 2014–15 season was a breakthrough year for Schwägli and teammates Alina Pätz, Nadine Lehmann and Marisa Winkelhausen. They won the 2014 Red Deer Curling Classic on the World Curling Tour. Schwägli also qualified for the playoffs at the 2014 Masters Grand Slam of Curling event. In the second half of the season, they won the International Bernese Ladies Cup and the Swiss Women's Curling Championship, qualifying them for the 2015 World Women's Curling Championship. Switzerland finished the round robin in first place with a 10–1 record. A victory over Canada's Jennifer Jones sent them to the final, where they once again faced Jones. Up 4–3 in the tenth end, Pätz drew to the button for the win, winning the World Championship gold medal and title.

The following season, Team Pätz won the right to represent Switzerland at the 2015 European Curling Championships, but they did not qualify for the playoffs, finishing 4–5. They also did not win any tour events during the season. They could not defend their title as world champions, as they lost in the Swiss championship to 2014 world champions Binia Feltscher. The 2016–17 season was more successful for the Swiss rink. They won the 2017 International Bernese Ladies Cup and made the final of the Glynhill Ladies International. They also won the Swiss championship and represented Switzerland at the 2017 World Women's Curling Championship. Despite starting 4–0, the team lost six of their last seven games, ultimately not qualifying for the playoffs. They ended their season by finishing second at the 2017 Euronics European Masters and making the semifinals of the 2017 Humpty's Champions Cup.

Team Pätz had multiple quarterfinal finishes during the 2017–18 curling season. They won the 2017 Stockholm Ladies Cup in October, defeating Kim Eun-jung in the final. The team competed against the other top Swiss teams, Silvana Tirinzoni and Binia Feltscher, at the 2017 Swiss Olympic Curling Trials to choose the Swiss representative at the 2018 Winter Olympics. The event was ultimately won by the Tirinzoni rink, who finished 6–0. After failing to win the Swiss championship in February, the Pätz team disbanded.

== Personal life ==
Schwägli is employed as a medical practitioner.

== Teams ==
| Season | Skip | Third | Second | Lead |
|---|---|---|---|---|
| 2004–05 | Michèle Jäggi | Nadine Freiburghaus | Nicole Schwägli | Marlene Albrecht |
| 2005–06 | Michèle Jäggi | Stéphanie Jäggi | Nicole Schwägli | Isabel Kurt |
| 2007–08 | Michèle Jäggi | Marisa Winkelhausen | Nicole Schwägli | Isabel Kurt |
| 2009–10 | Michèle Jäggi | Janet Hürlimann | Stéphanie Jäggi | Nicole Schwägli |
| 2010–11 | Michèle Jäggi | Marisa Winkelhausen | Stéphanie Jäggi | Nicole Schwägli |
| 2011–12 | Michèle Jäggi | Marisa Winkelhausen | Stéphanie Jäggi | Nicole Schwägli |
| 2013–14 | Alina Pätz | Nadine Lehmann | Nicole Schwägli | Nicole Dünki |
| 2014–15 | Alina Pätz | Nadine Lehmann | Marisa Winkelhausen | Nicole Schwägli |
| 2015–16 | Alina Pätz | Nadine Lehmann | Marisa Winkelhausen | Nicole Schwägli |
| 2016–17 | Alina Pätz | Nadine Lehmann | Marisa Winkelhausen | Nicole Schwägli |
| 2017–18 | Alina Pätz | Nadine Lehmann | Marisa Winkelhausen | Nicole Schwägli |
