= Nadine Lehmann =

Swiss curler

- Curler
- Born: 9 August 1990 (age 36)

Team
- Curling club: CC Baden Regio, Baden, SUI

Curling career
- Member Association: Switzerland
- World Championship: 2 (2015, 2017)
- World Mixed Doubles Championship: 2 (2012, 2013)
- European Championship: 1 (2015)
Medal record
Women's curling
Representing Switzerland
World Curling Championships
Gold medal – first place	2015 Sapporo
World Mixed Doubles Curling Championship
Gold medal – first place	2012 Erzurum

Nadine Lehmann (born 9 August 1990) is a Swiss curler from Richigen. She is the former third for the Alina Pätz rink and with this rink won the 2015 World Women's Curling Championship.

== Career ==
Lehmann was an alternate on the 8th place Swiss team at the 2012 World Junior Curling Championships, though she didn't play in any games. Later that year she won a gold medal at the 2012 World Mixed Doubles Curling Championship with Martin Rios. The pair would represent Switzerland again at the 2013 World Mixed Doubles Curling Championship, but finished 6th.

After juniors, Lehmann joined the Manuela Siegrist rink, playing second on the team. The team would play in two Grand Slam events, the 2012 Colonial Square Ladies Classic and the 2012 ROGERS Masters of Curling.

Lehmann and Siegrist's third, Alina Pätz formed a new rink in 2013. The team won the Swiss women's curling championship in 2015, defeating Silvana Tirinzoni in the final. This qualified them to represent Switzerland at the 2015 World Women's Curling Championship, Lehmann's first Worlds. At the Worlds, they would win the gold medal, defeating Canada's Jennifer Jones in the final. The team also won two World Curling Tour events during the 2014-15 season, winning the Red Deer Curling Classic and the International Bernese Ladies Cup. The team also played in two Grand Slam events, making the quarter finals at the 2014 Masters of Curling and missing the playoffs by one game at the 2014 Colonial Square Ladies Classic. They would represent Switzerland at the 2015 European Curling Championships, finding less success, placing just sixth place. The team returned to the World Championships in 2017, placing 8th. After the team didn't win the Swiss Championship in 2018, the Pätz rink disbanded as Lehmann and teammates Marisa Winkelhausen and Nicole Schwägli wanted to step back from competitive curling.
