= 2015 World Women's Curling Championship =

- Host city: Sapporo, Japan
- Arena: Tsukisamu Gymnasium
- Dates: March 14–22
- Winner: Switzerland
- Curling club: CC Baden Regio, Baden
- Skip: Alina Pätz
- Third: Nadine Lehmann
- Second: Marisa Winkelhausen
- Lead: Nicole Schwägli
- Finalist: Canada (Jennifer Jones)

The 2015 World Women's Curling Championship (branded as the Zen-Noh World Women's Curling Championship 2015 for sponsorship reasons) was held from March 14 to 22 at the Tsukisamu Gymnasium in Sapporo, Japan. It marks the second time that a world championship has been held in Japan, after the 2007 World Women's Curling Championship in Aomori.

== Qualification ==
The following nations are qualified to participate in the 2015 World Women's Curling Championship:

- Japan (host country)
- Two teams from the Americas zone
  - Canada
  - United States (given that no challenges in the Americas zone are issued)
- Eight teams from the 2014 European Curling Championships
  - Russia
  - Finland
  - Denmark
  - Scotland
  - Sweden
  - Switzerland
  - Germany
  - Norway (winner of the World Challenge Games)
- One team from the 2014 Pacific-Asia Curling Championships
  - China

== Teams ==
Canada	China	Denmark
St. Vital CC, Winnipeg Skip: Jennifer Jones; Third: Kaitlyn Lawes; Second: Jill Officer; Lead: Dawn McEwen; Alternate: Jennifer Clark-Rouire	Heilongjiang CC, Harbin Skip: Liu Sijia; Third: Jiang Yilun; Second: Liu Jinli; Lead: Wang Rui; Alternate: Yu Xinna	Hvidovre CC, Hvidovre Skip: Lene Nielsen; Third: Jeanne Ellegaard; Second: Stephanie Risdal Nielsen; Lead: Charlotte Clemmensen; Alternate: Isabella Clemmensen
Finland	Germany	Japan
Åland Curling, Eckerö Skip: Sanna Puustinen; Third: Heidi Hossi; Second: Oona Kauste; Lead: Marjo Hippi; Alternate: Maija Salmiovirta	CC Füssen, Füssen Skip: Daniela Driendl; Third: Analena Jentsch; Second: Stella Heiß; Lead: Pia-Lisa Schöll; Alternate: Marika Trettin	Sapporo CC, Sapporo Skip: Ayumi Ogasawara; Third: Sayaka Yoshimura; Second: Kaho Onodera; Lead: Anna Ohmiya; Alternate: Rina Ida
Norway	Russia	Scotland
Oppdal CK, Oppdal Skip: Kristin Skaslien; Third: Anneline Skårsmoen; Second: Julie Kjær Molnar; Lead: Kristine Davanger; Alternate: Pia Trulsen	Moskvitch CC, Moscow Skip: Anna Sidorova; Third: Margarita Fomina; Second: Alexandra Saitova; Lead: Ekaterina Galkina; Alternate: Nkeiruka Ezekh	Dunkeld CC, Pitlochry Skip: Eve Muirhead; Third: Anna Sloan; Second: Vicki Adams; Lead: Sarah Reid; Alternate: Lauren Gray
Sweden	Switzerland	United States
Skellefteå CK, Skellefteå Fourth: Maria Prytz; Third: Christina Bertrup; Second: Sara McManus; Skip: Margaretha Sigfridsson; Alternate: Sofia Mabergs	CC Baden Regio, Baden Skip: Alina Pätz; Third: Nadine Lehmann; Second: Marisa Winkelhausen; Lead: Nicole Schwägli; Alternate: Carole Howald	Four Seasons CC, Blaine Skip: Aileen Sormunen; Third: Monica Walker; Second: Tara Peterson; Lead: Vicky Persinger; Alternate: Becca Hamilton

=== WCT ranking ===
World Curling Tour Order of Merit ranking of national teams (year to date total)

Country (Skip)	Rank	Points
Canada (Jones)	1	207.325
Scotland (Muirhead)	4	150.905
Switzerland (Pätz)	8	108.260
Russia (Sidorova)	9	105.335
Sweden (Sigfridsson)	10	89.150
Japan (Ogasawara)	19	54.020
United States (Sormunen)	23	43.500
China (Liu)	34	25.695
Denmark (Nielsen)	45	20.000
Finland (Puustinen)	64	14.000
Germany (Driendl)	NR	0.000
Norway (Skaslien)	NR	0.000

== Round-robin standings ==
Final round-robin standings

Key
Teams to Playoffs
Teams to Tiebreaker

Locale	Skip	W	L	PF	PA	Ends Won	Ends Lost	Blank Ends	Stolen Ends	Shot Pct.
Switzerland	Alina Pätz	10	1	76	55	47	43	16	10	78%
Canada	Jennifer Jones	9	2	86	53	53	39	8	16	79%
Russia	Anna Sidorova	8	3	83	47	49	32	8	17	81%
Scotland	Eve Muirhead	7	4	80	67	46	45	11	10	79%
China	Liu Sijia	7	4	70	68	43	42	16	10	77%
Japan	Ayumi Ogasawara	6	5	67	66	43	46	14	10	75%
Sweden	Margaretha Sigfridsson	5	6	74	68	47	45	11	13	80%
Denmark	Lene Nielsen	4	7	63	75	42	48	7	8	73%
Germany	Daniela Driendl	4	7	60	74	41	54	12	6	74%
United States	Aileen Sormunen	3	8	53	81	41	44	14	14	74%
Finland	Sanna Puustinen	2	9	61	83	40	46	8	9	69%
Norway	Kristin Skaslien	1	10	48	86	36	44	9	5	68%

== Round-robin results ==
All draw times are listed in Japan Standard Time (UTC+9).

=== Draw 1 ===
Saturday, March 14, 14:00

Sheet A	1	2	3	4	5	6	7	8	9	10	Final
Norway (Skaslien)	3	0	1	0	1	0	1	0	0	X	6
China (Liu)	0	2	0	3	0	2	0	2	1	X	10

Sheet B	1	2	3	4	5	6	7	8	9	10	Final
United States (Sormunen)	0	1	0	2	0	1	0	0	X	X	4
Russia (Sidorova)	1	0	2	0	2	0	4	3	X	X	12

Sheet C	1	2	3	4	5	6	7	8	9	10	11	Final
Germany (Driendl)	1	0	0	0	0	1	0	0	0	2	2	6
Sweden (Sigfridsson)	0	1	0	1	0	0	0	1	1	0	0	4

Sheet D	1	2	3	4	5	6	7	8	9	10	Final
Japan (Ogasawara)	0	1	0	0	0	0	1	0	1	X	3
Switzerland (Pätz)	0	0	0	2	2	0	0	1	0	X	5

=== Draw 2 ===
Saturday, March 14, 19:00

Sheet A	1	2	3	4	5	6	7	8	9	10	Final
Finland (Puustinen)	0	1	0	1	0	3	0	1	0	0	6
Canada (Jones)	2	0	2	0	1	0	1	0	1	2	9

Sheet B	1	2	3	4	5	6	7	8	9	10	11	Final
China (Liu)	1	0	0	0	2	1	0	0	1	0	2	7
Germany (Driendl)	0	0	2	0	0	0	0	2	0	1	0	5

Sheet C	1	2	3	4	5	6	7	8	9	10	Final
Switzerland (Pätz)	0	2	2	0	0	1	0	0	0	1	6
United States (Sormunen)	1	0	0	0	2	0	0	1	1	0	5

Sheet D	1	2	3	4	5	6	7	8	9	10	Final
Denmark (Nielsen)	0	1	0	1	0	1	0	1	1	0	5
Scotland (Muirhead)	1	0	1	0	2	0	2	0	0	1	7

=== Draw 3 ===
Sunday, March 15, 9:00

Sheet B	1	2	3	4	5	6	7	8	9	10	Final
Sweden (Sigfridsson)	0	0	1	0	0	2	0	0	1	1	5
Japan (Ogasawara)	0	2	0	0	2	0	1	1	0	0	6

Sheet C	1	2	3	4	5	6	7	8	9	10	Final
Norway (Skaslien)	0	0	1	0	0	1	X	X	X	X	2
Russia (Sidorova)	3	1	0	2	3	0	X	X	X	X	9

=== Draw 4 ===
Sunday, March 15, 14:00

Sheet A	1	2	3	4	5	6	7	8	9	10	Final
Switzerland (Pätz)	0	1	1	0	1	0	3	0	1	X	7
Germany (Driendl)	1	0	0	1	0	0	0	1	0	X	3

Sheet B	1	2	3	4	5	6	7	8	9	10	Final
Scotland (Muirhead)	0	0	1	1	0	2	0	0	X	X	4
Canada (Jones)	2	1	0	0	2	0	2	2	X	X	9

Sheet C	1	2	3	4	5	6	7	8	9	10	Final
Finland (Puustinen)	2	0	0	2	0	2	0	2	1	X	9
Denmark (Nielsen)	0	1	1	0	4	0	1	0	0	X	7

Sheet D	1	2	3	4	5	6	7	8	9	10	Final
United States (Sormunen)	1	0	1	0	0	1	1	0	0	0	4
China (Liu)	0	1	0	2	1	0	0	0	2	2	8

=== Draw 5 ===
Sunday, March 15, 19:00

Sheet A	1	2	3	4	5	6	7	8	9	10	Final
Russia (Sidorova)	0	0	2	2	1	2	X	X	X	X	7
Denmark (Nielsen)	0	0	0	0	0	0	X	X	X	X	0

Sheet B	1	2	3	4	5	6	7	8	9	10	Final
Finland (Puustinen)	4	0	1	2	0	3	X	X	X	X	10
Norway (Skaslien)	0	1	0	0	1	0	X	X	X	X	2

Sheet C	1	2	3	4	5	6	7	8	9	10	Final
Scotland (Muirhead)	0	3	0	2	0	0	0	2	0	0	7
Japan (Ogasawara)	1	0	3	0	0	1	0	0	2	2	9

Sheet D	1	2	3	4	5	6	7	8	9	10	Final
Sweden (Sigfridsson)	0	2	1	0	1	0	0	3	1	0	8
Canada (Jones)	3	0	0	1	0	1	0	0	0	1	6

=== Draw 6 ===
Monday, March 16, 9:00

Sheet A	1	2	3	4	5	6	7	8	9	10	Final
United States (Sormunen)	0	1	0	1	0	0	X	X	X	X	2
Scotland (Muirhead)	2	0	2	0	2	3	X	X	X	X	9

Sheet B	1	2	3	4	5	6	7	8	9	10	Final
Denmark (Nielsen)	0	2	2	1	0	1	0	0	0	2	8
Switzerland (Pätz)	2	0	0	0	1	0	2	1	1	0	7

Sheet C	1	2	3	4	5	6	7	8	9	10	Final
Canada (Jones)	0	1	2	1	1	0	1	1	X	X	7
China (Liu)	0	0	0	0	0	1	0	0	X	X	1

Sheet D	1	2	3	4	5	6	7	8	9	10	Final
Finland (Puustinen)	0	1	1	1	0	1	0	0	1	1	6
Germany (Driendl)	2	0	0	0	2	0	2	1	0	0	7

=== Draw 7 ===
Monday, March 16, 14:00

Sheet A	1	2	3	4	5	6	7	8	9	10	Final
China (Liu)	1	0	0	0	0	1	0	1	0	X	3
Switzerland (Pätz)	0	1	2	0	0	0	1	0	3	X	7

Sheet B	1	2	3	4	5	6	7	8	9	10	Final
Russia (Sidorova)	2	1	0	2	0	1	0	2	1	X	9
Sweden (Sigfridsson)	0	0	1	0	1	0	1	0	0	X	3

Sheet C	1	2	3	4	5	6	7	8	9	10	Final
United States (Sormunen)	0	0	1	1	0	1	1	0	1	0	5
Germany (Driendl)	1	1	0	0	0	0	0	2	0	2	6

Sheet D	1	2	3	4	5	6	7	8	9	10	Final
Norway (Skaslien)	1	0	1	1	0	0	0	2	0	0	5
Japan (Ogasawara)	0	0	0	0	2	2	1	0	0	1	6

=== Draw 8 ===
Monday, March 16, 19:00

Sheet A	1	2	3	4	5	6	7	8	9	10	Final
Denmark (Nielsen)	1	0	0	1	0	1	0	1	0	1	5
Sweden (Sigfridsson)	0	1	1	0	3	0	1	0	1	0	7

Sheet B	1	2	3	4	5	6	7	8	9	10	Final
Norway (Skaslien)	0	2	0	0	0	2	0	0	2	1	7
Scotland (Muirhead)	2	0	1	1	2	0	0	2	0	0	8

Sheet C	1	2	3	4	5	6	7	8	9	10	Final
Japan (Ogasawara)	0	1	1	0	0	1	2	0	3	X	8
Finland (Puustinen)	1	0	0	1	1	0	0	2	0	X	5

Sheet D	1	2	3	4	5	6	7	8	9	10	Final
Canada (Jones)	1	0	0	2	1	0	2	0	0	1	7
Russia (Sidorova)	0	1	1	0	0	1	0	0	2	0	5

=== Draw 9 ===
Tuesday, March 17, 9:00

Sheet A	1	2	3	4	5	6	7	8	9	10	Final
Germany (Driendl)	1	0	2	2	0	0	3	0	X	X	8
Norway (Skaslien)	0	1	0	0	2	0	0	1	X	X	4

Sheet B	1	2	3	4	5	6	7	8	9	10	Final
United States (Sormunen)	0	1	0	2	1	0	0	1	0	1	6
Japan (Ogasawara)	1	0	0	0	0	1	0	0	2	0	4

Sheet C	1	2	3	4	5	6	7	8	9	10	Final
Russia (Sidorova)	0	0	1	0	2	0	1	0	0	X	4
Switzerland (Pätz)	0	0	0	2	0	1	0	2	3	X	8

Sheet D	1	2	3	4	5	6	7	8	9	10	Final
China (Liu)	0	1	0	0	0	1	0	1	0	X	3
Sweden (Sigfridsson)	0	0	1	1	1	0	2	0	4	X	9

=== Draw 10 ===
Tuesday, March 17, 14:00

Sheet A	1	2	3	4	5	6	7	8	9	10	Final
Canada (Jones)	2	0	0	3	0	0	2	3	X	X	10
United States (Walker)	0	1	0	0	0	1	0	0	X	X	2

Sheet B	1	2	3	4	5	6	7	8	9	10	Final
Switzerland (Pätz)	0	3	0	0	2	0	0	2	0	1	8
Finland (Puustinen)	1	0	1	3	0	1	0	0	1	0	7

Sheet C	1	2	3	4	5	6	7	8	9	10	Final
China (Liu)	2	1	0	1	0	0	0	2	0	1	7
Scotland (Muirhead)	0	0	3	0	0	1	0	0	1	0	5

Sheet D	1	2	3	4	5	6	7	8	9	10	Final
Germany (Driendl)	0	2	0	1	0	2	0	0	2	0	7
Denmark (Nielsen)	2	0	1	0	1	0	0	2	0	3	9

=== Draw 11 ===
Tuesday, March 17, 19:00

Sheet A	1	2	3	4	5	6	7	8	9	10	Final
Russia (Sidorova)	0	0	1	0	2	1	0	2	1	X	7
Japan (Ogasawara)	0	1	0	2	0	0	0	0	0	X	3

Sheet B	1	2	3	4	5	6	7	8	9	10	Final
Canada (Jones)	0	1	0	3	0	1	0	2	0	1	8
Denmark (Nielsen)	1	0	2	0	1	0	2	0	1	0	7

Sheet C	1	2	3	4	5	6	7	8	9	10	Final
Sweden (Sigfridsson)	1	0	2	0	0	1	0	4	0	X	8
Norway (Skaslien)	0	1	0	0	2	0	1	0	1	X	5

Sheet D	1	2	3	4	5	6	7	8	9	10	Final
Scotland (Muirhead)	3	0	0	1	0	0	2	1	1	X	8
Finland (Puustinen)	0	0	2	0	1	0	0	0	0	X	3

=== Draw 12 ===
Wednesday, March 18, 9:00

Sheet A	1	2	3	4	5	6	7	8	9	10	Final
Sweden (Sigfridsson)	1	0	6	1	0	4	X	X	X	X	12
Finland (Puustinen)	0	2	0	0	2	0	X	X	X	X	4

Sheet B	1	2	3	4	5	6	7	8	9	10	Final
Scotland (Muirhead)	0	1	0	4	1	0	0	0	3	X	9
Russia (Sidorova)	2	0	1	0	0	0	1	1	0	X	5

Sheet C	1	2	3	4	5	6	7	8	9	10	Final
Denmark (Nielsen)	0	1	0	0	1	0	1	0	1	0	4
Japan (Ogasawara)	1	0	2	1	0	1	0	1	0	1	7

Sheet D	1	2	3	4	5	6	7	8	9	10	Final
Canada (Jones)	0	2	0	0	5	2	X	X	X	X	9
Norway (Skaslien)	1	0	1	1	0	0	X	X	X	X	3

=== Draw 13 ===
Wednesday, March 18, 14:00

Sheet A	1	2	3	4	5	6	7	8	9	10	11	Final
Norway (Skaslien)	1	0	0	1	0	1	0	1	0	1	0	5
Switzerland (Pätz)	0	1	0	0	1	0	2	0	1	0	1	6

Sheet B	1	2	3	4	5	6	7	8	9	10	Final
Japan (Ogasawara)	0	1	0	2	0	0	3	0	0	X	6
China (Liu)	1	0	2	0	0	3	0	2	1	X	9

Sheet C	1	2	3	4	5	6	7	8	9	10	Final
Germany (Driendl)	0	1	0	1	0	1	0	0	X	X	3
Russia (Sidorova)	1	0	1	0	3	0	1	2	X	X	8

Sheet D	1	2	3	4	5	6	7	8	9	10	Final
Sweden (Sigfridsson)	0	0	1	2	0	0	0	2	1	0	6
United States (Sormunen)	0	2	0	0	0	1	1	0	0	3	7

=== Draw 14 ===
Wednesday, March 18, 19:00

Sheet A	1	2	3	4	5	6	7	8	9	10	Final
Scotland (Muirhead)	1	0	1	0	2	0	1	0	2	0	7
Germany (Driendl)	0	2	0	1	0	0	0	1	0	1	5

Sheet B	1	2	3	4	5	6	7	8	9	10	Final
Finland (Puustinen)	0	0	0	1	1	0	0	2	0	X	4
United States (Sormunen)	0	1	1	0	0	3	2	0	1	X	8

Sheet C	1	2	3	4	5	6	7	8	9	10	Final
Switzerland (Pätz)	2	1	0	1	0	0	2	0	1	0	7
Canada (Jones)	0	0	2	0	2	0	0	1	0	1	6

Sheet D	1	2	3	4	5	6	7	8	9	10	Final
Denmark (Nielsen)	0	0	2	0	0	1	0	X	X	X	3
China (Liu)	0	2	0	3	2	0	3	X	X	X	10

=== Draw 15 ===
Thursday, March 19, 9:00

Sheet A	1	2	3	4	5	6	7	8	9	10	Final
United States (Sormunen)	0	1	0	0	1	1	0	2	0	X	5
Denmark (Nielsen)	0	0	2	1	0	0	4	0	1	X	8

Sheet B	1	2	3	4	5	6	7	8	9	10	11	Final
Germany (Driendl)	0	1	0	0	2	0	0	1	0	1	0	5
Canada (Jones)	1	0	1	0	0	1	1	0	1	0	2	7

Sheet C	1	2	3	4	5	6	7	8	9	10	Final
Finland (Puustinen)	0	1	0	1	0	0	0	0	3	0	5
China (Liu)	0	0	3	0	0	0	0	2	0	1	6

Sheet D	1	2	3	4	5	6	7	8	9	10	Final
Switzerland (Pätz)	0	2	0	2	0	2	0	2	0	0	8
Scotland (Muirhead)	0	0	2	0	1	0	2	0	0	1	6

=== Draw 16 ===
Thursday, March 19, 14:00

Sheet A	1	2	3	4	5	6	7	8	9	10	Final
Japan (Ogasawara)	1	0	0	0	2	0	0	2	0	X	5
Canada (Jones)	0	2	2	0	0	1	2	0	1	X	8

Sheet B	1	2	3	4	5	6	7	8	9	10	Final
Denmark (Nielsen)	0	0	3	2	2	0	X	X	X	X	7
Norway (Skaslien)	0	0	0	0	0	1	X	X	X	X	1

Sheet C	1	2	3	4	5	6	7	8	9	10	Final
Scotland (Muirhead)	0	2	0	2	1	0	3	0	0	2	10
Sweden (Sigfridsson)	1	0	2	0	0	1	0	2	1	0	7

Sheet D	1	2	3	4	5	6	7	8	9	10	Final
Russia (Sidorova)	2	2	3	0	1	0	X	X	X	X	8
Finland (Puustinen)	0	0	0	1	0	1	X	X	X	X	2

=== Draw 17 ===
Thursday, March 19, 19:00

Sheet A	1	2	3	4	5	6	7	8	9	10	Final
China (Liu)	0	0	2	0	1	1	0	2	0	X	6
Russia (Sidorova)	2	2	0	2	0	0	2	0	3	X	11

Sheet B	1	2	3	4	5	6	7	8	9	10	Final
Sweden (Sigfridsson)	0	0	1	1	0	0	1	0	2	X	5
Switzerland (Pätz)	0	2	0	0	2	2	0	1	0	X	7

Sheet C	1	2	3	4	5	6	7	8	9	10	Final
Norway (Skaslien)	2	0	2	0	0	2	0	0	2	X	8
United States (Sormunen)	0	3	0	0	0	0	1	1	0	X	5

Sheet D	1	2	3	4	5	6	7	8	9	10	Final
Japan (Ogasawara)	3	0	0	1	1	0	4	0	1	X	10
Germany (Driendl)	0	1	1	0	0	1	0	2	0	X	5

=== Tiebreaker ===
Friday, March 20, 9:00

Sheet D	1	2	3	4	5	6	7	8	9	10	Final
China (Liu)	1	0	0	0	1	1	0	1	0	X	4
Scotland (Muirhead)	0	1	1	1	0	0	3	0	3	X	9

Player percentages
China		Scotland	
Wang Rui	82%	Sarah Reid	89%
Liu Jinli	92%	Vicki Adams	79%
Jiang Yilun	76%	Anna Sloan	93%
Liu Sijia	79%	Eve Muirhead	83%
Total	82%	Total	86%

== Playoffs ==
Page playoff system
1	Switzerland	6
2	Canada	4
3	Russia	7
4	Scotland	2

Semifinal
2	Canada	7
3	Russia	4

Final
1	Switzerland	5
2	Canada	3

Bronze Medal Game
3	Russia	13
4	Scotland	4

=== 3 vs. 4 ===
Friday, March 20, 19:00

Sheet B	1	2	3	4	5	6	7	8	9	10	Final
Russia (Sidorova)	0	0	1	0	1	1	0	2	2	X	7
Scotland (Muirhead)	0	0	0	1	0	0	1	0	0	X	2

Player percentages
Russia		Scotland	
Ekaterina Galkina	88%	Sarah Reid	75%
Alexandra Saitova	86%	Vicki Adams	89%
Margarita Fomina	90%	Anna Sloan	74%
Anna Sidorova	84%	Eve Muirhead	71%
Total	87%	Total	77%

=== 1 vs. 2 ===
Saturday, March 21, 9:00

Sheet B	1	2	3	4	5	6	7	8	9	10	Final
Switzerland (Pätz)	2	0	0	1	0	1	0	0	2	X	6
Canada (Jones)	0	0	1	0	1	0	1	1	0	X	4

Player percentages
Switzerland		Canada	
Nicole Schwägli	80%	Dawn McEwen	94%
Marisa Winkelhausen	96%	Jill Officer	86%
Nadine Lehmann	85%	Kaitlyn Lawes	86%
Alina Pätz	84%	Jennifer Jones	79%
Total	86%	Total	86%

=== Semifinal ===
Saturday, March 21, 17:00

Sheet B	1	2	3	4	5	6	7	8	9	10	Final
Canada (Jones)	2	1	0	2	0	0	1	1	0	X	7
Russia (Sidorova)	0	0	1	0	0	2	0	0	1	X	4

Player percentages
Canada		Russia	
Dawn McEwen	90%	Ekaterina Galkina	90%
Jill Officer	82%	Alexandra Saitova	81%
Kaitlyn Lawes	89%	Margarita Fomina	79%
Jennifer Jones	86%	Anna Sidorova	70%
Total	87%	Total	80%

=== Bronze medal game ===
Sunday, March 22, 9:00

Sheet B	1	2	3	4	5	6	7	8	9	10	Final
Russia (Sidorova)	5	0	1	1	3	0	3	0	X	X	13
Scotland (Muirhead)	0	1	0	0	0	2	0	1	X	X	4

Player percentages
Russia		Scotland	
Ekaterina Galkina	86%	Sarah Reid	92%
Alexandra Saitova	98%	Vicki Adams	91%
Margarita Fomina	91%	Anna Sloan	75%
Anna Sidorova	86%	Eve Muirhead	66%
Total	90%	Total	81%

=== Final ===
Sunday, March 22, 15:00

Sheet B	1	2	3	4	5	6	7	8	9	10	Final
Switzerland (Pätz)	0	1	1	0	0	2	0	0	0	1	5
Canada (Jones)	0	0	0	0	0	0	2	0	1	0	3

Player percentages
Switzerland		Canada	
Nicole Schwägli	88%	Dawn McEwen	99%
Marisa Winkelhausen	96%	Jill Officer	83%
Nadine Lehmann	90%	Kaitlyn Lawes	78%
Alina Pätz	84%	Jennifer Jones	80%
Total	89%	Total	85%

2015 Ford World Women's Curling Championship winner
(Switzerland)
Switzerland
5th title

== Statistics ==
=== Top 5 Player percentages ===
Final Round Robin Percentages

Leads	%
(Canada) Dawn McEwen	87
(Russia) Ekaterina Galkina	86
(Sweden) Margaretha Sigfridsson (Skip)	86
(Germany) Pia-Lisa Schöll	83
(Scotland) Sarah Reid	83

Seconds	%
(Sweden) Sara McManus	83
(Scotland) Vicki Adams	82
(Russia) Alexandra Saitova	80
(China) Liu Jinli	80
(Germany) Stella Heiß	78

Thirds	%
(Russia) Margarita Fomina	81
(Scotland) Anna Sloan	79
(Canada) Kaitlyn Lawes	79
(Switzerland) Nadine Lehmann	78
(Sweden) Christina Bertrup	78

Skips	%
(Switzerland) Alina Pätz	79
(Russia) Anna Sidorova	77
(Canada) Jennifer Jones	77
(Scotland) Eve Muirhead	77
(Sweden) Maria Prytz (Fourth)	75

=== Perfect games ===
Player	Team	Position	Opponent
Sara McManus	Sweden	Second	Finland
