= 2017 World Women's Curling Championship =

- Host city: Beijing, China
- Arena: Capital Indoor Stadium
- Dates: March 18–26
- Winner: Canada
- Curling club: Ottawa CC, Ottawa
- Skip: Rachel Homan
- Third: Emma Miskew
- Second: Joanne Courtney
- Lead: Lisa Weagle
- Alternate: Cheryl Kreviazuk
- Coach: Adam Kingsbury
- Finalist: Russia (Anna Sidorova)

The 2017 World Women's Curling Championship (branded as CPT World Women's Curling Championship 2017 for sponsorship reasons) was a curling event held between March 18–26 at the Capital Indoor Stadium in Beijing, China. The winning Rachel Homan rink from Canada was the first team to go through a women's world championship undefeated since the event began in 1979, winning 13 games through the round robin, playoffs and final. Runners-up Russia took their first silver medal on this event.

== Qualification ==
The following nations are qualified to participate in the 2017 World Women's Curling Championship:

- China (host country)
- Two teams from the Americas zone
  - Canada
  - United States (winner of the 2017 Americas Challenge)
- Eight teams from the 2016 European Curling Championships
  - Russia
  - Sweden
  - Scotland
  - Czech Republic
  - Denmark
  - Switzerland
  - Germany
  - Italy (winner of the World Challenge Games)
- One team from the 2016 Pacific-Asia Curling Championships
  - South Korea

== Teams ==
| Canada | China | Czech Republic |
|---|---|---|
| Ottawa CC, Ottawa Skip: Rachel Homan; Third: Emma Miskew; Second: Joanne Courtney; Lead: Lisa Weagle; Alternate: Cheryl Kreviazuk | Harbin CC, Harbin Skip: Wang Bingyu; Third: Wang Rui; Second: Liu Jinli; Lead: Zhou Yan; Alternate: Yang Ying | CC Sokol Liboc, Prague Skip: Anna Kubešková; Third: Alžběta Baudyšová; Second: Tereza Plíšková; Lead: Klára Svatoňová; Alternate: Ezhen Kolchevskaia |
| Denmark | Germany | Italy |
| Hvidovre CC, Hvidovre Skip: Lene Nielsen; Third: Madeleine Dupont; Second: Stephanie Risdal; Lead: Charlotte Clemmensen; Alternate: Denise Dupont | CC Füssen, Füssen Skip: Daniela Jentsch; Third: Josephine Obermann; Second: Analena Jentsch; Lead: Pia-Lisa Schöll; Alternate: Emira Abbes | CC Lago Santo, Cembra Skip: Diana Gaspari; Third: Veronica Zappone; Second: Chiara Olivieri; Lead: Arianna Losano; Alternate: Denise Pimpini |
| Russia | Scotland | South Korea |
| Moskvitch CC, Moscow Skip: Anna Sidorova; Third: Margarita Fomina; Second: Alina Kovaleva; Lead: Nkeirouka Ezekh; Alternate: Alexandra Raeva | Dunkeld CC, Pitlochry Skip: Eve Muirhead; Third: Anna Sloan; Second: Vicki Adams; Lead: Lauren Gray; Alternate: Kelly Schafer | GyeongBuk Uiseong CC, Uiseong Skip: Kim Eun-jung; Third: Kim Kyeong-ae; Second: Kim Seon-yeong; Lead: Kim Yeong-mi; Alternate: Kim Cho-hi |
| Sweden | Switzerland | United States |
| Sundbybergs CK, Sundbyberg Skip: Anna Hasselborg; Third: Sara McManus; Second: Agnes Knochenhauer; Lead: Sofia Mabergs; Alternate: Jennie Wåhlin | CC Baden Regio, Baden Skip: Alina Pätz; Third: Nadine Lehmann; Second: Marisa Winkelhausen; Lead: Nicole Schwägli; Alternate: Briar Hürlimann | Madison CC, Madison Skip: Nina Roth; Third: Tabitha Peterson; Second: Aileen Geving; Lead: Becca Hamilton; Alternate: Cory Christensen |

=== WCT ranking ===
Year to date World Curling Tour order of merit ranking for each team prior to the event.

| Nation (Skip) | Rank | Points |
|---|---|---|
| Canada (Homan) | 1 | 402.01 |
| Sweden (Hasselborg) | 2 | 362.22 |
| Scotland (Muirhead) | 8 | 271.11 |
| China (Wang) | 10 | 224.43 |
| United States (Roth) | 16 | 169.97 |
| Switzerland (Pätz) | 19 | 164.41 |
| South Korea (Kim) | 25 | 150.60 |
| Russia (Sidorova) | 30 | 115.78 |
| Czech Republic (Kubešková) | 49 | 79.143 |
| Germany (Jentsch) | 68 | 53.015 |
| Denmark (Nielsen) | 127 | 16.975 |
| Italy (Gaspari) | NR | – |

== Round-robin standings ==
Final round-robin standings

Key
| Teams to Playoffs |

| Locale | Skip | W | L | PF | PA | Ends Won | Ends Lost | Blank Ends | Stolen Ends | Shot Pct. | DSC |
|---|---|---|---|---|---|---|---|---|---|---|---|
| Canada | Rachel Homan | 11 | 0 | 88 | 51 | 46 | 34 | 19 | 10 | 85% | 37.13 |
| Russia | Anna Sidorova | 8 | 3 | 89 | 69 | 50 | 41 | 11 | 16 | 81% | 65.78 |
| Sweden | Anna Hasselborg | 8 | 3 | 77 | 55 | 47 | 38 | 15 | 9 | 84% | 28.94 |
| Scotland | Eve Muirhead | 7 | 4 | 72 | 67 | 44 | 42 | 17 | 9 | 82% | 40.74 |
| United States | Nina Roth | 6 | 5 | 72 | 69 | 51 | 47 | 10 | 15 | 79% | 41.70 |
| South Korea | Kim Eun-jung | 5 | 6 | 79 | 74 | 51 | 46 | 7 | 15 | 78% | 31.94 |
| Czech Republic | Anna Kubešková | 5 | 6 | 65 | 78 | 42 | 47 | 11 | 10 | 73% | 51.86 |
| Switzerland | Alina Pätz | 5 | 6 | 83 | 76 | 44 | 44 | 10 | 10 | 78% | 42.94 |
| Germany | Daniela Jentsch | 5 | 6 | 62 | 66 | 41 | 39 | 22 | 9 | 75% | 43.23 |
| Italy | Diana Gaspari | 3 | 8 | 55 | 83 | 36 | 49 | 13 | 6 | 71% | 68.72 |
| China | Wang Bingyu | 2 | 9 | 61 | 85 | 45 | 53 | 10 | 7 | 74% | 48.07 |
| Denmark | Lene Nielsen | 1 | 10 | 56 | 86 | 34 | 51 | 17 | 2 | 75% | 49.88 |

== Round-robin results ==
All draw times are listed in China Standard Time (UTC+8).

=== Draw 1 ===
Saturday, March 18, 13:00

| Sheet A | 1 | 2 | 3 | 4 | 5 | 6 | 7 | 8 | 9 | 10 | 11 | Final |
|---|---|---|---|---|---|---|---|---|---|---|---|---|
| United States (Roth) | 0 | 0 | 2 | 1 | 0 | 2 | 1 | 2 | 0 | 0 | 0 | 8 |
| Scotland (Muirhead) 🔨 | 3 | 0 | 0 | 0 | 3 | 0 | 0 | 0 | 1 | 1 | 1 | 9 |

| Sheet B | 1 | 2 | 3 | 4 | 5 | 6 | 7 | 8 | 9 | 10 | Final |
|---|---|---|---|---|---|---|---|---|---|---|---|
| Italy (Gaspari) | 0 | 1 | 0 | 1 | 0 | 0 | 1 | 0 | 1 | X | 4 |
| Sweden (Hasselborg) 🔨 | 1 | 0 | 2 | 0 | 0 | 3 | 0 | 1 | 0 | X | 7 |

| Sheet C | 1 | 2 | 3 | 4 | 5 | 6 | 7 | 8 | 9 | 10 | Final |
|---|---|---|---|---|---|---|---|---|---|---|---|
| Switzerland (Pätz) 🔨 | 0 | 0 | 4 | 0 | 3 | 0 | 0 | 0 | 0 | X | 7 |
| Germany (Jentsch) | 0 | 0 | 0 | 1 | 0 | 1 | 1 | 0 | 2 | X | 5 |

| Sheet D | 1 | 2 | 3 | 4 | 5 | 6 | 7 | 8 | 9 | 10 | Final |
|---|---|---|---|---|---|---|---|---|---|---|---|
| China (Wang) | 0 | 0 | 0 | 0 | 1 | 0 | 1 | 1 | 0 | X | 3 |
| Canada (Homan) 🔨 | 0 | 4 | 0 | 1 | 0 | 1 | 0 | 0 | 3 | X | 9 |

=== Draw 2 ===
Saturday, March 18, 19:00

| Sheet A | 1 | 2 | 3 | 4 | 5 | 6 | 7 | 8 | 9 | 10 | Final |
|---|---|---|---|---|---|---|---|---|---|---|---|
| Denmark (Nielsen) | 0 | 1 | 0 | 0 | 1 | 0 | 1 | 0 | 1 | 1 | 5 |
| Czech Republic (Kubešková) 🔨 | 1 | 0 | 2 | 0 | 0 | 1 | 0 | 2 | 0 | 0 | 6 |

| Sheet B | 1 | 2 | 3 | 4 | 5 | 6 | 7 | 8 | 9 | 10 | Final |
|---|---|---|---|---|---|---|---|---|---|---|---|
| Germany (Jentsch) | 0 | 0 | 1 | 0 | 1 | 0 | 0 | 0 | X | X | 2 |
| Canada (Homan) 🔨 | 2 | 0 | 0 | 1 | 0 | 1 | 1 | 1 | X | X | 6 |

| Sheet C | 1 | 2 | 3 | 4 | 5 | 6 | 7 | 8 | 9 | 10 | Final |
|---|---|---|---|---|---|---|---|---|---|---|---|
| South Korea (Kim) 🔨 | 1 | 0 | 1 | 0 | 0 | 1 | 1 | 0 | 2 | 0 | 6 |
| Russia (Sidorova) | 0 | 2 | 0 | 2 | 1 | 0 | 0 | 2 | 0 | 2 | 9 |

| Sheet D | 1 | 2 | 3 | 4 | 5 | 6 | 7 | 8 | 9 | 10 | Final |
|---|---|---|---|---|---|---|---|---|---|---|---|
| Sweden (Hasselborg) | 0 | 3 | 0 | 1 | 0 | 3 | 0 | 0 | 1 | 0 | 8 |
| United States (Roth) 🔨 | 1 | 0 | 3 | 0 | 3 | 0 | 1 | 1 | 0 | 1 | 10 |

=== Draw 3 ===
Sunday, March 19, 9:00

| Sheet B | 1 | 2 | 3 | 4 | 5 | 6 | 7 | 8 | 9 | 10 | Final |
|---|---|---|---|---|---|---|---|---|---|---|---|
| Switzerland (Pätz) | 1 | 0 | 3 | 1 | 0 | 0 | 0 | 1 | 0 | 2 | 8 |
| China (Wang) 🔨 | 0 | 1 | 0 | 0 | 2 | 1 | 0 | 0 | 3 | 0 | 7 |

| Sheet C | 1 | 2 | 3 | 4 | 5 | 6 | 7 | 8 | 9 | 10 | Final |
|---|---|---|---|---|---|---|---|---|---|---|---|
| Italy (Gaspari) | 0 | 1 | 0 | 1 | 0 | 0 | 3 | 0 | 2 | 0 | 7 |
| Scotland (Muirhead) 🔨 | 2 | 0 | 0 | 0 | 0 | 1 | 0 | 1 | 0 | 2 | 6 |

=== Draw 4 ===
Sunday, March 19, 14:00

| Sheet A | 1 | 2 | 3 | 4 | 5 | 6 | 7 | 8 | 9 | 10 | 11 | Final |
|---|---|---|---|---|---|---|---|---|---|---|---|---|
| Canada (Homan) 🔨 | 3 | 0 | 2 | 0 | 2 | 0 | 0 | 2 | 0 | 0 | 1 | 10 |
| Russia (Sidorova) | 0 | 2 | 0 | 2 | 0 | 3 | 0 | 0 | 0 | 2 | 0 | 9 |

| Sheet B | 1 | 2 | 3 | 4 | 5 | 6 | 7 | 8 | 9 | 10 | Final |
|---|---|---|---|---|---|---|---|---|---|---|---|
| United States (Roth) 🔨 | 0 | 1 | 1 | 0 | 0 | 0 | 1 | 0 | 0 | X | 3 |
| Czech Republic (Kubešková) | 1 | 0 | 0 | 3 | 1 | 1 | 0 | 0 | 1 | X | 7 |

| Sheet C | 1 | 2 | 3 | 4 | 5 | 6 | 7 | 8 | 9 | 10 | Final |
|---|---|---|---|---|---|---|---|---|---|---|---|
| Sweden (Hasselborg) 🔨 | 0 | 0 | 1 | 0 | 1 | 0 | 3 | 0 | 0 | 2 | 7 |
| Denmark (Nielsen) | 0 | 0 | 0 | 1 | 0 | 1 | 0 | 2 | 0 | 0 | 4 |

| Sheet D | 1 | 2 | 3 | 4 | 5 | 6 | 7 | 8 | 9 | 10 | Final |
|---|---|---|---|---|---|---|---|---|---|---|---|
| South Korea (Kim) | 0 | 0 | 2 | 0 | 0 | 2 | 0 | 2 | 0 | X | 6 |
| Germany (Jentsch) 🔨 | 0 | 2 | 0 | 1 | 2 | 0 | 2 | 0 | 3 | X | 10 |

=== Draw 5 ===
Sunday, March 19, 19:00

| Sheet A | 1 | 2 | 3 | 4 | 5 | 6 | 7 | 8 | 9 | 10 | Final |
|---|---|---|---|---|---|---|---|---|---|---|---|
| South Korea (Kim) 🔨 | 1 | 0 | 2 | 1 | 1 | 0 | 0 | 1 | 1 | X | 7 |
| Italy (Gaspari) | 0 | 1 | 0 | 0 | 0 | 2 | 1 | 0 | 0 | X | 4 |

| Sheet B | 1 | 2 | 3 | 4 | 5 | 6 | 7 | 8 | 9 | 10 | Final |
|---|---|---|---|---|---|---|---|---|---|---|---|
| Scotland (Muirhead) 🔨 | 3 | 0 | 1 | 4 | 0 | 0 | 0 | 1 | 0 | 1 | 10 |
| Russia (Sidorova) | 0 | 1 | 0 | 0 | 2 | 1 | 1 | 0 | 2 | 0 | 7 |

| Sheet C | 1 | 2 | 3 | 4 | 5 | 6 | 7 | 8 | 9 | 10 | 11 | Final |
|---|---|---|---|---|---|---|---|---|---|---|---|---|
| Czech Republic (Kubešková) | 0 | 2 | 0 | 2 | 0 | 0 | 2 | 0 | 1 | 0 | 1 | 8 |
| China (Wang) 🔨 | 1 | 0 | 1 | 0 | 2 | 0 | 0 | 1 | 0 | 2 | 0 | 7 |

| Sheet D | 1 | 2 | 3 | 4 | 5 | 6 | 7 | 8 | 9 | 10 | Final |
|---|---|---|---|---|---|---|---|---|---|---|---|
| Switzerland (Pätz) | 0 | 1 | 4 | 2 | 0 | 1 | 0 | 4 | X | X | 12 |
| Denmark (Nielsen) 🔨 | 2 | 0 | 0 | 0 | 1 | 0 | 1 | 0 | X | X | 4 |

=== Draw 6 ===
Monday, March 20, 9:00

| Sheet A | 1 | 2 | 3 | 4 | 5 | 6 | 7 | 8 | 9 | 10 | Final |
|---|---|---|---|---|---|---|---|---|---|---|---|
| Germany (Jentsch) 🔨 | 0 | 0 | 2 | 1 | 0 | 0 | 0 | 1 | 0 | X | 4 |
| Sweden (Hasselborg) | 2 | 1 | 0 | 0 | 2 | 0 | 0 | 0 | 1 | X | 6 |

| Sheet B | 1 | 2 | 3 | 4 | 5 | 6 | 7 | 8 | 9 | 10 | Final |
|---|---|---|---|---|---|---|---|---|---|---|---|
| Denmark (Nielsen) 🔨 | 1 | 0 | 4 | 0 | 2 | 0 | 0 | 0 | 0 | 0 | 7 |
| South Korea (Kim) | 0 | 0 | 0 | 2 | 0 | 1 | 1 | 1 | 1 | 2 | 8 |

| Sheet C | 1 | 2 | 3 | 4 | 5 | 6 | 7 | 8 | 9 | 10 | Final |
|---|---|---|---|---|---|---|---|---|---|---|---|
| United States (Roth) 🔨 | 1 | 1 | 0 | 1 | 0 | 0 | 0 | 2 | 0 | X | 5 |
| Canada (Homan) | 0 | 0 | 1 | 0 | 1 | 2 | 0 | 0 | 3 | X | 7 |

| Sheet D | 1 | 2 | 3 | 4 | 5 | 6 | 7 | 8 | 9 | 10 | Final |
|---|---|---|---|---|---|---|---|---|---|---|---|
| Russia (Sidorova) 🔨 | 1 | 0 | 3 | 0 | 1 | 0 | 1 | 3 | 0 | X | 9 |
| Czech Republic (Kubešková) | 0 | 1 | 0 | 2 | 0 | 2 | 0 | 0 | 2 | X | 7 |

=== Draw 7 ===
Monday, March 20, 14:00

| Sheet A | 1 | 2 | 3 | 4 | 5 | 6 | 7 | 8 | 9 | 10 | Final |
|---|---|---|---|---|---|---|---|---|---|---|---|
| China (Wang) | 0 | 1 | 0 | 3 | 1 | 0 | 0 | 0 | 1 | 1 | 7 |
| South Korea (Kim) 🔨 | 1 | 0 | 2 | 0 | 0 | 1 | 1 | 1 | 0 | 0 | 6 |

| Sheet B | 1 | 2 | 3 | 4 | 5 | 6 | 7 | 8 | 9 | 10 | Final |
|---|---|---|---|---|---|---|---|---|---|---|---|
| Czech Republic (Kubešková) 🔨 | 1 | 0 | 1 | 1 | 0 | 0 | 1 | 1 | 1 | X | 6 |
| Italy (Gaspari) | 0 | 2 | 0 | 0 | 5 | 1 | 0 | 0 | 0 | X | 8 |

| Sheet C | 1 | 2 | 3 | 4 | 5 | 6 | 7 | 8 | 9 | 10 | Final |
|---|---|---|---|---|---|---|---|---|---|---|---|
| Russia (Sidorova) | 0 | 2 | 0 | 1 | 0 | 2 | 0 | 2 | 0 | X | 7 |
| Switzerland (Pätz) 🔨 | 3 | 0 | 1 | 0 | 2 | 0 | 5 | 0 | 1 | X | 12 |

| Sheet D | 1 | 2 | 3 | 4 | 5 | 6 | 7 | 8 | 9 | 10 | Final |
|---|---|---|---|---|---|---|---|---|---|---|---|
| Denmark (Nielsen) | 0 | 0 | 0 | 0 | 0 | 2 | 0 | 0 | X | X | 2 |
| Scotland (Muirhead) 🔨 | 0 | 0 | 1 | 1 | 2 | 0 | 1 | 2 | X | X | 7 |

=== Draw 8 ===
Monday, March 20, 19:00

| Sheet A | 1 | 2 | 3 | 4 | 5 | 6 | 7 | 8 | 9 | 10 | Final |
|---|---|---|---|---|---|---|---|---|---|---|---|
| Italy (Gaspari) | 0 | 0 | 0 | 2 | 0 | 1 | 0 | 1 | 0 | X | 4 |
| United States (Roth) 🔨 | 2 | 0 | 1 | 0 | 2 | 0 | 1 | 0 | 3 | X | 9 |

| Sheet B | 1 | 2 | 3 | 4 | 5 | 6 | 7 | 8 | 9 | 10 | Final |
|---|---|---|---|---|---|---|---|---|---|---|---|
| Canada (Homan) 🔨 | 1 | 0 | 0 | 3 | 2 | 0 | 0 | 2 | 0 | X | 8 |
| Switzerland (Pätz) | 0 | 0 | 1 | 0 | 0 | 2 | 1 | 0 | 2 | X | 6 |

| Sheet C | 1 | 2 | 3 | 4 | 5 | 6 | 7 | 8 | 9 | 10 | Final |
|---|---|---|---|---|---|---|---|---|---|---|---|
| Scotland (Muirhead) | 0 | 0 | 0 | 1 | 0 | 2 | 0 | 0 | 0 | X | 3 |
| Sweden (Hasselborg) 🔨 | 1 | 0 | 1 | 0 | 2 | 0 | 0 | 2 | 1 | X | 7 |

| Sheet D | 1 | 2 | 3 | 4 | 5 | 6 | 7 | 8 | 9 | 10 | 11 | Final |
|---|---|---|---|---|---|---|---|---|---|---|---|---|
| Germany (Jentsch) | 0 | 1 | 0 | 1 | 0 | 3 | 0 | 1 | 1 | 0 | 3 | 10 |
| China (Wang) 🔨 | 1 | 0 | 2 | 0 | 1 | 0 | 1 | 0 | 0 | 2 | 0 | 7 |

=== Draw 9 ===
Tuesday, March 21, 9:00

| Sheet A | 1 | 2 | 3 | 4 | 5 | 6 | 7 | 8 | 9 | 10 | Final |
|---|---|---|---|---|---|---|---|---|---|---|---|
| Russia (Sidorova) | 0 | 0 | 2 | 2 | 0 | 0 | 3 | 0 | 1 | X | 8 |
| Germany (Jentsch) 🔨 | 0 | 2 | 0 | 0 | 0 | 1 | 0 | 1 | 0 | X | 4 |

| Sheet B | 1 | 2 | 3 | 4 | 5 | 6 | 7 | 8 | 9 | 10 | Final |
|---|---|---|---|---|---|---|---|---|---|---|---|
| United States (Roth) | 0 | 1 | 0 | 1 | 0 | 1 | 0 | 1 | 0 | 3 | 7 |
| Denmark (Nielsen) 🔨 | 0 | 0 | 1 | 0 | 2 | 0 | 1 | 0 | 2 | 0 | 6 |

| Sheet C | 1 | 2 | 3 | 4 | 5 | 6 | 7 | 8 | 9 | 10 | Final |
|---|---|---|---|---|---|---|---|---|---|---|---|
| Canada (Homan) | 0 | 0 | 2 | 0 | 2 | 0 | 4 | 0 | 1 | 0 | 9 |
| South Korea (Kim) 🔨 | 0 | 1 | 0 | 2 | 0 | 2 | 0 | 2 | 0 | 1 | 8 |

| Sheet D | 1 | 2 | 3 | 4 | 5 | 6 | 7 | 8 | 9 | 10 | Final |
|---|---|---|---|---|---|---|---|---|---|---|---|
| Czech Republic (Kubešková) | 0 | 0 | 3 | 0 | 0 | 1 | 0 | 0 | 0 | X | 4 |
| Sweden (Hasselborg) 🔨 | 0 | 3 | 0 | 1 | 1 | 0 | 0 | 3 | 2 | X | 10 |

=== Draw 10 ===
Tuesday, March 21, 14:00

| Sheet A | 1 | 2 | 3 | 4 | 5 | 6 | 7 | 8 | 9 | 10 | Final |
|---|---|---|---|---|---|---|---|---|---|---|---|
| Switzerland (Pätz) 🔨 | 0 | 0 | 3 | 0 | 0 | 2 | 0 | 2 | 0 | X | 7 |
| Czech Republic (Kubešková) | 0 | 1 | 0 | 1 | 3 | 0 | 2 | 0 | 3 | X | 10 |

| Sheet B | 1 | 2 | 3 | 4 | 5 | 6 | 7 | 8 | 9 | 10 | Final |
|---|---|---|---|---|---|---|---|---|---|---|---|
| Scotland (Muirhead) 🔨 | 0 | 1 | 0 | 2 | 0 | 1 | 0 | 2 | 0 | X | 6 |
| South Korea (Kim) | 2 | 0 | 2 | 0 | 2 | 0 | 2 | 0 | 2 | X | 10 |

| Sheet C | 1 | 2 | 3 | 4 | 5 | 6 | 7 | 8 | 9 | 10 | Final |
|---|---|---|---|---|---|---|---|---|---|---|---|
| Denmark (Nielsen) | 0 | 0 | 2 | 0 | 1 | 0 | 2 | 0 | 0 | X | 5 |
| China (Wang) 🔨 | 0 | 2 | 0 | 1 | 0 | 2 | 0 | 1 | 1 | X | 7 |

| Sheet D | 1 | 2 | 3 | 4 | 5 | 6 | 7 | 8 | 9 | 10 | Final |
|---|---|---|---|---|---|---|---|---|---|---|---|
| Russia (Sidorova) 🔨 | 1 | 2 | 2 | 5 | 0 | 1 | X | X | X | X | 11 |
| Italy (Gaspari) | 0 | 0 | 0 | 0 | 1 | 0 | X | X | X | X | 1 |

=== Draw 11 ===
Tuesday, March 21, 19:00

| Sheet A | 1 | 2 | 3 | 4 | 5 | 6 | 7 | 8 | 9 | 10 | Final |
|---|---|---|---|---|---|---|---|---|---|---|---|
| Canada (Homan) 🔨 | 0 | 0 | 2 | 0 | 2 | 0 | 4 | X | X | X | 8 |
| Scotland (Muirhead) | 0 | 0 | 0 | 0 | 0 | 2 | 0 | X | X | X | 2 |

| Sheet B | 1 | 2 | 3 | 4 | 5 | 6 | 7 | 8 | 9 | 10 | Final |
|---|---|---|---|---|---|---|---|---|---|---|---|
| Sweden (Hasselborg) 🔨 | 3 | 0 | 1 | 0 | 3 | 0 | 2 | X | X | X | 9 |
| Switzerland (Pätz) | 0 | 1 | 0 | 2 | 0 | 1 | 0 | X | X | X | 4 |

| Sheet C | 1 | 2 | 3 | 4 | 5 | 6 | 7 | 8 | 9 | 10 | Final |
|---|---|---|---|---|---|---|---|---|---|---|---|
| Italy (Gaspari) | 0 | 1 | 1 | 0 | 0 | 2 | 0 | 0 | 1 | 0 | 5 |
| Germany (Jentsch) 🔨 | 1 | 0 | 0 | 1 | 0 | 0 | 0 | 2 | 0 | 3 | 7 |

| Sheet D | 1 | 2 | 3 | 4 | 5 | 6 | 7 | 8 | 9 | 10 | Final |
|---|---|---|---|---|---|---|---|---|---|---|---|
| China (Wang) 🔨 | 0 | 0 | 2 | 1 | 0 | 0 | 1 | 0 | 1 | 0 | 5 |
| United States (Roth) | 1 | 1 | 0 | 0 | 0 | 1 | 0 | 3 | 0 | 1 | 7 |

=== Draw 12 ===
Wednesday, March 22, 9:00

| Sheet A | 1 | 2 | 3 | 4 | 5 | 6 | 7 | 8 | 9 | 10 | Final |
|---|---|---|---|---|---|---|---|---|---|---|---|
| Russia (Sidorova) | 0 | 0 | 0 | 2 | 1 | 0 | 2 | 3 | 0 | X | 8 |
| Denmark (Nielsen) 🔨 | 0 | 0 | 2 | 0 | 0 | 3 | 0 | 0 | 1 | X | 6 |

| Sheet B | 1 | 2 | 3 | 4 | 5 | 6 | 7 | 8 | 9 | 10 | Final |
|---|---|---|---|---|---|---|---|---|---|---|---|
| China (Wang) 🔨 | 0 | 2 | 0 | 1 | 0 | 1 | 0 | 0 | 2 | 0 | 6 |
| Scotland (Muirhead) | 0 | 0 | 3 | 0 | 1 | 0 | 2 | 1 | 0 | 1 | 8 |

| Sheet C | 1 | 2 | 3 | 4 | 5 | 6 | 7 | 8 | 9 | 10 | Final |
|---|---|---|---|---|---|---|---|---|---|---|---|
| South Korea (Kim) | 0 | 2 | 0 | 3 | 3 | 1 | 1 | X | X | X | 10 |
| Czech Republic (Kubešková) 🔨 | 1 | 0 | 2 | 0 | 0 | 0 | 0 | X | X | X | 3 |

| Sheet D | 1 | 2 | 3 | 4 | 5 | 6 | 7 | 8 | 9 | 10 | Final |
|---|---|---|---|---|---|---|---|---|---|---|---|
| Italy (Gaspari) | 0 | 1 | 0 | 0 | 0 | 1 | 0 | X | X | X | 2 |
| Switzerland (Pätz) 🔨 | 2 | 0 | 0 | 4 | 3 | 0 | 1 | X | X | X | 10 |

=== Draw 13 ===
Wednesday, March 22, 14:00

| Sheet A | 1 | 2 | 3 | 4 | 5 | 6 | 7 | 8 | 9 | 10 | Final |
|---|---|---|---|---|---|---|---|---|---|---|---|
| Scotland (Muirhead) 🔨 | 1 | 0 | 0 | 1 | 0 | 1 | 0 | 0 | 3 | 1 | 7 |
| Switzerland (Pätz) | 0 | 1 | 1 | 0 | 1 | 0 | 0 | 1 | 0 | 0 | 4 |

| Sheet B | 1 | 2 | 3 | 4 | 5 | 6 | 7 | 8 | 9 | 10 | Final |
|---|---|---|---|---|---|---|---|---|---|---|---|
| Germany (Jentsch) 🔨 | 0 | 2 | 0 | 1 | 0 | 1 | 0 | 0 | 1 | 1 | 6 |
| United States (Roth) | 0 | 0 | 1 | 0 | 1 | 0 | 1 | 1 | 0 | 0 | 4 |

| Sheet C | 1 | 2 | 3 | 4 | 5 | 6 | 7 | 8 | 9 | 10 | Final |
|---|---|---|---|---|---|---|---|---|---|---|---|
| China (Wang) 🔨 | 0 | 0 | 1 | 0 | 2 | 0 | 1 | 0 | 0 | X | 4 |
| Italy (Gaspari) | 0 | 1 | 0 | 3 | 0 | 1 | 0 | 1 | 2 | X | 8 |

| Sheet D | 1 | 2 | 3 | 4 | 5 | 6 | 7 | 8 | 9 | 10 | Final |
|---|---|---|---|---|---|---|---|---|---|---|---|
| Sweden (Hasselborg) | 0 | 0 | 0 | 2 | 0 | 1 | 0 | 0 | 1 | X | 4 |
| Canada (Homan) 🔨 | 0 | 2 | 0 | 0 | 2 | 0 | 0 | 2 | 0 | X | 6 |

=== Draw 14 ===
Wednesday, March 22, 19:00

| Sheet A | 1 | 2 | 3 | 4 | 5 | 6 | 7 | 8 | 9 | 10 | Final |
|---|---|---|---|---|---|---|---|---|---|---|---|
| Czech Republic (Kubešková) | 0 | 0 | 1 | 0 | 0 | 2 | 0 | 0 | X | X | 3 |
| Canada (Homan) 🔨 | 2 | 0 | 0 | 2 | 2 | 0 | 2 | 1 | X | X | 9 |

| Sheet B | 1 | 2 | 3 | 4 | 5 | 6 | 7 | 8 | 9 | 10 | Final |
|---|---|---|---|---|---|---|---|---|---|---|---|
| South Korea (Kim) 🔨 | 2 | 0 | 1 | 0 | 0 | 0 | 1 | 0 | 1 | 0 | 5 |
| Sweden (Hasselborg) | 0 | 1 | 0 | 1 | 1 | 1 | 0 | 1 | 0 | 1 | 6 |

| Sheet C | 1 | 2 | 3 | 4 | 5 | 6 | 7 | 8 | 9 | 10 | Final |
|---|---|---|---|---|---|---|---|---|---|---|---|
| Germany (Jentsch) | 0 | 3 | 0 | 1 | 0 | 0 | 0 | 1 | 4 | X | 9 |
| Denmark (Nielsen) 🔨 | 0 | 0 | 2 | 0 | 0 | 3 | 0 | 0 | 0 | X | 5 |

| Sheet D | 1 | 2 | 3 | 4 | 5 | 6 | 7 | 8 | 9 | 10 | Final |
|---|---|---|---|---|---|---|---|---|---|---|---|
| United States (Roth) 🔨 | 0 | 2 | 1 | 0 | 0 | 0 | 1 | 0 | 2 | 0 | 6 |
| Russia (Sidorova) | 1 | 0 | 0 | 0 | 4 | 1 | 0 | 1 | 0 | 1 | 8 |

=== Draw 15 ===
Thursday, March 23, 9:00

| Sheet A | 1 | 2 | 3 | 4 | 5 | 6 | 7 | 8 | 9 | 10 | Final |
|---|---|---|---|---|---|---|---|---|---|---|---|
| Sweden (Hasselborg) | 0 | 3 | 0 | 2 | 0 | 2 | 0 | 2 | 1 | X | 10 |
| China (Wang) 🔨 | 1 | 0 | 1 | 0 | 1 | 0 | 1 | 0 | 0 | X | 4 |

| Sheet B | 1 | 2 | 3 | 4 | 5 | 6 | 7 | 8 | 9 | 10 | Final |
|---|---|---|---|---|---|---|---|---|---|---|---|
| Italy (Gaspari) | 0 | 0 | 2 | 0 | 0 | 1 | 0 | 0 | 2 | 0 | 5 |
| Canada (Homan) 🔨 | 0 | 2 | 0 | 3 | 0 | 0 | 0 | 2 | 0 | 1 | 8 |

| Sheet C | 1 | 2 | 3 | 4 | 5 | 6 | 7 | 8 | 9 | 10 | Final |
|---|---|---|---|---|---|---|---|---|---|---|---|
| Switzerland (Pätz) 🔨 | 0 | 0 | 1 | 0 | 0 | 2 | 0 | 1 | 1 | 0 | 5 |
| United States (Roth) | 1 | 1 | 0 | 1 | 1 | 0 | 2 | 0 | 0 | 2 | 8 |

| Sheet D | 1 | 2 | 3 | 4 | 5 | 6 | 7 | 8 | 9 | 10 | Final |
|---|---|---|---|---|---|---|---|---|---|---|---|
| Scotland (Muirhead) | 0 | 2 | 0 | 2 | 0 | 0 | 0 | 0 | 3 | X | 7 |
| Germany (Jentsch) 🔨 | 0 | 0 | 1 | 0 | 0 | 0 | 1 | 0 | 0 | X | 2 |

=== Draw 16 ===
Thursday, March 23, 14:00

| Sheet A | 1 | 2 | 3 | 4 | 5 | 6 | 7 | 8 | 9 | 10 | Final |
|---|---|---|---|---|---|---|---|---|---|---|---|
| United States (Roth) 🔨 | 0 | 2 | 0 | 1 | 0 | 0 | 0 | 1 | 0 | 1 | 5 |
| South Korea (Kim) | 0 | 0 | 1 | 0 | 0 | 1 | 1 | 0 | 1 | 0 | 4 |

| Sheet B | 1 | 2 | 3 | 4 | 5 | 6 | 7 | 8 | 9 | 10 | Final |
|---|---|---|---|---|---|---|---|---|---|---|---|
| Czech Republic (Kubešková) | 0 | 1 | 1 | 0 | 0 | 0 | 3 | 0 | 0 | X | 5 |
| Germany (Jentsch) 🔨 | 0 | 0 | 0 | 1 | 0 | 0 | 0 | 1 | 1 | X | 3 |

| Sheet C | 1 | 2 | 3 | 4 | 5 | 6 | 7 | 8 | 9 | 10 | Final |
|---|---|---|---|---|---|---|---|---|---|---|---|
| Sweden (Hasselborg) 🔨 | 0 | 1 | 0 | 1 | 0 | 1 | 0 | 0 | 0 | X | 3 |
| Russia (Sidorova) | 0 | 0 | 1 | 0 | 1 | 0 | 1 | 0 | 4 | X | 7 |

| Sheet D | 1 | 2 | 3 | 4 | 5 | 6 | 7 | 8 | 9 | 10 | Final |
|---|---|---|---|---|---|---|---|---|---|---|---|
| Canada (Homan) | 1 | 0 | 1 | 0 | 1 | 0 | 0 | 3 | 2 | X | 8 |
| Denmark (Nielsen) 🔨 | 0 | 1 | 0 | 1 | 0 | 0 | 2 | 0 | 0 | X | 4 |

=== Draw 17 ===
Thursday, March 23, 19:00

| Sheet A | 1 | 2 | 3 | 4 | 5 | 6 | 7 | 8 | 9 | 10 | Final |
|---|---|---|---|---|---|---|---|---|---|---|---|
| Denmark (Nielsen) | 0 | 2 | 0 | 1 | 0 | 0 | 3 | 0 | 0 | 2 | 8 |
| Italy (Gaspari) 🔨 | 1 | 0 | 1 | 0 | 0 | 1 | 0 | 4 | 0 | 0 | 7 |

| Sheet B | 1 | 2 | 3 | 4 | 5 | 6 | 7 | 8 | 9 | 10 | Final |
|---|---|---|---|---|---|---|---|---|---|---|---|
| Russia (Sidorova) | 0 | 1 | 0 | 1 | 0 | 2 | 1 | 0 | 0 | 1 | 6 |
| China (Wang) 🔨 | 0 | 0 | 1 | 0 | 0 | 0 | 0 | 2 | 1 | 0 | 4 |

| Sheet C | 1 | 2 | 3 | 4 | 5 | 6 | 7 | 8 | 9 | 10 | Final |
|---|---|---|---|---|---|---|---|---|---|---|---|
| Czech Republic (Kubešková) | 0 | 1 | 0 | 0 | 2 | 0 | 2 | 0 | 1 | 0 | 6 |
| Scotland (Muirhead) 🔨 | 1 | 0 | 0 | 2 | 0 | 1 | 0 | 1 | 0 | 2 | 7 |

| Sheet D | 1 | 2 | 3 | 4 | 5 | 6 | 7 | 8 | 9 | 10 | Final |
|---|---|---|---|---|---|---|---|---|---|---|---|
| Switzerland (Pätz) | 2 | 0 | 1 | 0 | 2 | 0 | 0 | 1 | 0 | 2 | 8 |
| South Korea (Kim) 🔨 | 0 | 0 | 0 | 5 | 0 | 2 | 0 | 0 | 2 | 0 | 9 |

== Playoffs ==
Page playoff system
1 | Canada | 7
2 | Russia | 3
3 | Sweden | 8
4 | Scotland | 5

Semifinal
2 | Russia | 9
3 | Sweden | 3

Gold Medal Game
1 | Canada | 8
2 | Russia | 3

| Bronze Medal Game |
| 4 | Scotland | 6 |
| 3 | Sweden | 4 |

=== 1 vs. 2 ===
Friday, March 24, 19:00

| Sheet C | 1 | 2 | 3 | 4 | 5 | 6 | 7 | 8 | 9 | 10 | Final |
|---|---|---|---|---|---|---|---|---|---|---|---|
| Canada (Homan) 🔨 | 0 | 1 | 0 | 2 | 1 | 0 | 1 | 1 | 1 | X | 7 |
| Russia (Sidorova) | 0 | 0 | 2 | 0 | 0 | 1 | 0 | 0 | 0 | X | 3 |

Player percentages
| Canada | | Russia | |
|---|---|---|---|
| Lisa Weagle | 85% | Nkeiruka Ezekh | 75% |
| Joanne Courtney | 83% | Alina Kovaleva | 79% |
| Emma Miskew | 92% | Margarita Fomina | 69% |
| Rachel Homan | 90% | Anna Sidorova | 69% |
| Total | 90% | Total | 71% |

=== 3 vs. 4 ===
Saturday, March 25, 14:00

| Sheet C | 1 | 2 | 3 | 4 | 5 | 6 | 7 | 8 | 9 | 10 | Final |
|---|---|---|---|---|---|---|---|---|---|---|---|
| Sweden (Hasselborg) 🔨 | 1 | 1 | 0 | 1 | 0 | 2 | 0 | 3 | 0 | X | 8 |
| Scotland (Muirhead) | 0 | 0 | 1 | 0 | 1 | 0 | 2 | 0 | 1 | X | 5 |

Player percentages
| Sweden | | Scotland | |
|---|---|---|---|
| Sofia Mabergs | 93% | Lauren Gray | 86% |
| Agnes Knochenhauer | 88% | Vicki Adams | 66% |
| Sara McManus | 65% | Anna Sloan | 68% |
| Anna Hasselborg | 78% | Eve Muirhead | 74% |
| Total | 81% | Total | 74% |

=== Semifinal ===
Saturday, March 25, 19:00

| Sheet C | 1 | 2 | 3 | 4 | 5 | 6 | 7 | 8 | 9 | 10 | Final |
|---|---|---|---|---|---|---|---|---|---|---|---|
| Russia (Sidorova) 🔨 | 2 | 0 | 0 | 1 | 0 | 0 | 3 | 3 | X | X | 9 |
| Sweden (Hasselborg) | 0 | 0 | 1 | 0 | 2 | 0 | 0 | 0 | X | X | 3 |

Player percentages
| Russia | | Sweden | |
|---|---|---|---|
| Alina Kovaleva | 70% | Sofia Mabergs | 86% |
| Alexandra Raeva | 78% | Agnes Knochenhauer | 58% |
| Margarita Fomina | 88% | Sara McManus | 84% |
| Anna Sidorova | 85% | Anna Hasselborg | 84% |
| Total | 80% | Total | 78% |

=== Bronze medal game ===
Sunday, March 26, 10:00

| Sheet C | 1 | 2 | 3 | 4 | 5 | 6 | 7 | 8 | 9 | 10 | Final |
|---|---|---|---|---|---|---|---|---|---|---|---|
| Scotland (Muirhead) | 0 | 0 | 0 | 1 | 0 | 2 | 0 | 1 | 1 | 1 | 6 |
| Sweden (Hasselborg) 🔨 | 0 | 2 | 0 | 0 | 1 | 0 | 1 | 0 | 0 | 0 | 4 |

Player percentages
| Scotland | | Sweden | |
|---|---|---|---|
| Lauren Gray | 95% | Sofia Mabergs | 89% |
| Vicki Adams | 85% | Agnes Knochenhauer | 83% |
| Anna Sloan | 81% | Sara McManus | 80% |
| Eve Muirhead | 75% | Anna Hasselborg | 67% |
| Total | 84% | Total | 80% |

=== Gold medal game ===
Sunday, March 26, 15:00

| Sheet C | 1 | 2 | 3 | 4 | 5 | 6 | 7 | 8 | 9 | 10 | Final |
|---|---|---|---|---|---|---|---|---|---|---|---|
| Canada (Homan) 🔨 | 0 | 2 | 1 | 0 | 0 | 3 | 0 | 2 | X | X | 8 |
| Russia (Sidorova) | 0 | 0 | 0 | 0 | 1 | 0 | 2 | 0 | X | X | 3 |

Player percentages
| Canada | | Russia | |
|---|---|---|---|
| Lisa Weagle | 95% | Alina Kovaleva | 95% |
| Joanne Courtney | 75% | Alexandra Raeva | 83% |
| Emma Miskew | 89% | Margarita Fomina | 86% |
| Rachel Homan | 93% | Anna Sidorova | 55% |
| Total | 90% | Total | 80% |

2017 World Women's Curling Championship winner
(Canada)
Canada
16th title

== Statistics ==
=== Top 5 player percentages ===
After Round Robin; minimum 5 games

| Leads | % |
|---|---|
| (Sweden) Sofia Mabergs | 87 |
| (Canada) Lisa Weagle | 84 |
| (Scotland) Lauren Gray | 84 |
| (Switzerland) Nicole Schwägli | 84 |
| (United States) Becca Hamilton | 83 |

| Seconds | % |
|---|---|
| (Canada) Joanne Courtney | 90 |
| (Russia) Alina Kovaleva | 85 |
| (Sweden) Agnes Knochenhauer | 83 |
| (Scotland) Vicki Adams | 81 |
| (South Korea) Kim Seon-yeong | 80 |

| Thirds | % |
|---|---|
| (Sweden) Sara McManus | 84 |
| (Canada) Emma Miskew | 83 |
| (Russia) Margarita Fomina | 82 |
| (Scotland) Anna Sloan | 82 |
| (South Korea) Kim Kyeong-ae | 81 |

| Skips | % |
|---|---|
| (Canada) Rachel Homan | 85 |
| (Sweden) Anna Hasselborg | 85 |
| (Scotland) Eve Muirhead | 82 |
| (Russia) Anna Sidorova | 81 |
| (United States) Nina Roth | 77 |

=== Perfect games ===
| Player | Team | Position | Opponent |
|---|---|---|---|
| Kim Seon-yeong | South Korea | Second | Scotland |
| Alina Kovaleva | Russia | Second | Italy |
