= Vicki Chalmers =

Scottish curler

- Curler
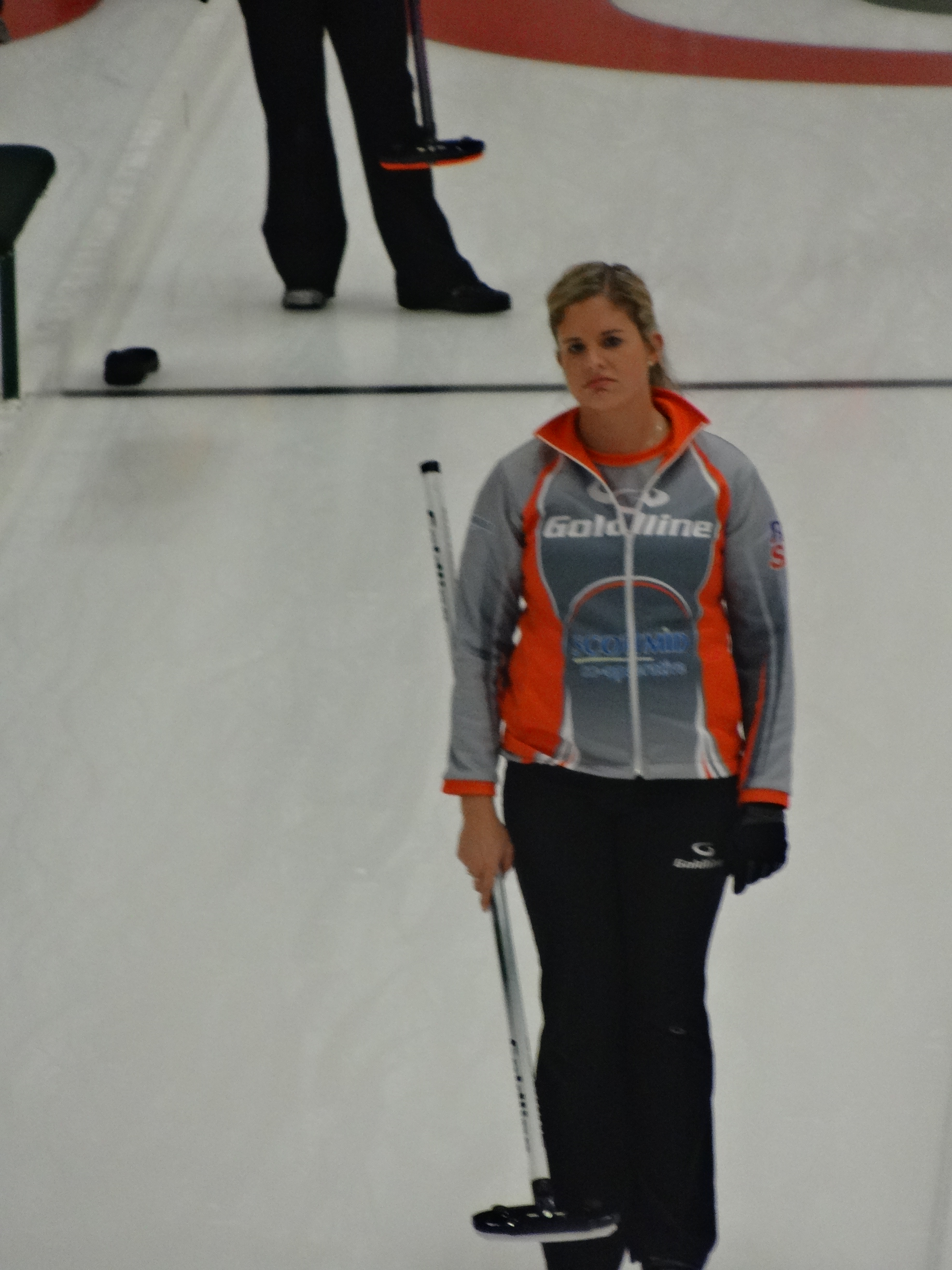
- Born: Victoria Adams; 16 November 1989 (age 36); Edinburgh, Scotland

Team
- Curling club: Portpatrick CC, Portpatrick, SCO

Curling career
- Member Association: Scotland; Great Britain
- World Championship: 6 (2011, 2012, 2013, 2015, 2016, 2017)
- European Championship: 8 (2011, 2012, 2013, 2014, 2015, 2016, 2017, 2018)
- Olympic: 2 (2014, 2018)
- Grand Slam victories: 6 (2013 Players', 2013 Autumn Gold, 2014 Colonial Square, 2014 Canadian Open, 2015 Players', 2016 Players')
Medal record
Curling
Representing Great Britain
Olympic Games
Bronze medal – third place	2014 Sochi
Winter Universiade
Gold medal – first place	2011 Erzurum
Representing Scotland
World Championships
Gold medal – first place	2013 Riga
Bronze medal – third place	2017 Beijing
European Curling Championships
Gold medal – first place	2011 Moscow
Gold medal – first place	2017 St Gallen
Silver medal – second place	2012 Karlstad
Silver medal – second place	2013 Stavanger
Silver medal – second place	2015 Esbjerg
Bronze medal – third place	2014 Champéry
Bronze medal – third place	2016 Braehead
Scottish Women's Curling Championship
Gold medal – first place	2011 Perth
Gold medal – first place	2012 Perth
Gold medal – first place	2013 Perth
Gold medal – first place	2015 Perth
Gold medal – first place	2016 Perth
Gold medal – first place	2017 Perth
Silver medal – second place	2019 Perth
World Junior Curling Championships
Gold medal – first place	2008 Östersund
Gold medal – first place	2009 Vancouver
Gold medal – first place	2011 Perth

Victoria Elizabeth "Vicki" Chalmers (née Adams) (born 16 November 1989) is a Scottish former curler who was the long time second for Eve Muirhead. Representing Scotland, they won the 2013 World Championships and the European Championships in 2011 and 2017. Representing Great Britain, they are the 2014 Olympic bronze medallists and finished fourth at the 2018 Winter Olympics.

== Career ==
Chalmers was born in Edinburgh, Scotland and lives in Stranraer and Stirling. She has been a long-time member of the Muirhead rink, dating back to her junior career. With Muirhead, she won three gold medals at the World Junior Curling Championships, winning in 2008, 2009 and 2011. Chalmers, whilst at the University of the West of Scotland also won a gold medal at the 2011 Winter Universiade, playing second for Anna Sloan.

Chalmers stayed with the Muirhead rink after her junior career, except for the 2011 World Championships, when she played second for Sloan, finishing ninth. With the Muirhead rink, she won a gold medal at the 2011 European Championships in Moscow and the 2013 World Championships in Riga. The Scottish world champion team of Muirhead, Sloan, Chalmers and Claire Hamilton, were selected to represent Great Britain at the 2014 Winter Olympics, where they won the bronze medal.

== Personal life ==
Chalmers is married to Andrew Chalmers and is the younger sister of curler, Kay Adams.

Like her longtime team-mate Eve Muirhead, she has coeliac disease
