= Alexandra Raeva =

Russian curler

Alexandra Raeva Алекса́ндра Ра́ева
- Curler
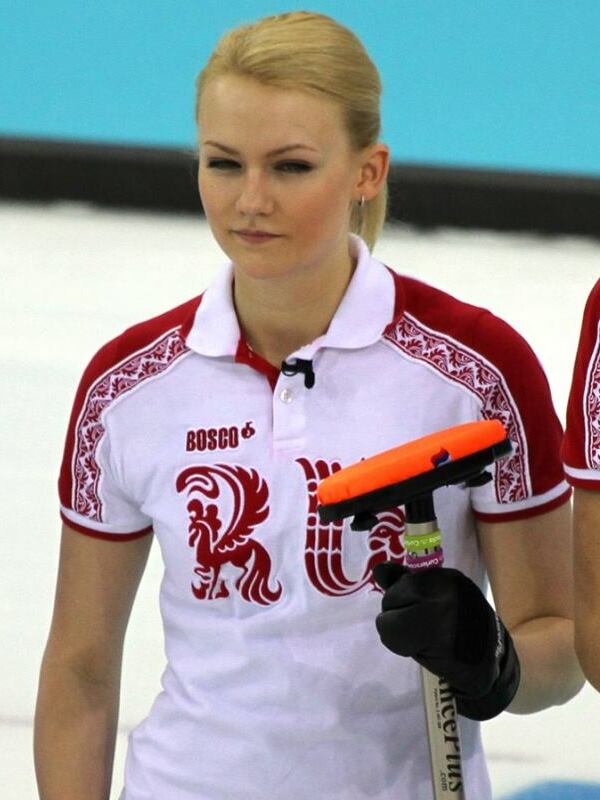
- Born: Alexandra Saitova; 20 August 1992 (age 34); Moscow, Russia

Team
- Curling club: Moskvitch CC, Moscow, RUS

Curling career
- World Championship: 4 (2014, 2015, 2016, 2017
- European Championship: 4 (2013, 2014, 2015, 2017)
- Olympic: 1 (2014)
Medal record
Women's curling
Representing Russia
World Championships
Silver medal – second place	2017 Beijing
Bronze medal – third place	2014 Saint John
Bronze medal – third place	2015 Sapporo
Bronze medal – third place	2016 Swift Current
European Championships
Gold medal – first place	2015 Esbjerg
Silver medal – second place	2014 Champéry
Winter Universiade
Gold medal – first place	2013 Trentino
Gold medal – first place	2015 Granada
World Junior Curling Championships
Gold medal – first place	2013 Sochi
Bronze medal – third place	2012 Östersund

Alexandra Aleksandrovna Raeva (née Saitova) (Russian: Алекса́ндра Алекса́ндровна Ра́ева (Саи́това); born 20 August 1992 in Moscow, Russia) is a Russian female curler, member of the Russian national women's curling team that competed in Curling at the 2014 Winter Olympics – Women's tournament. She previously competed for the Russian junior national team, which won gold at the 2013 Winter Universiade. Raeva most recently won a silver medal at the 2017 World Women's Curling Championship in Beijing, China, following an 8–3 loss to Team Canada skipped by Rachel Homan.

== Personal life ==
Raeva is married. She attended State Academic University for the Humanities.
