= Anna Sloan =

Scottish curler

- Curler
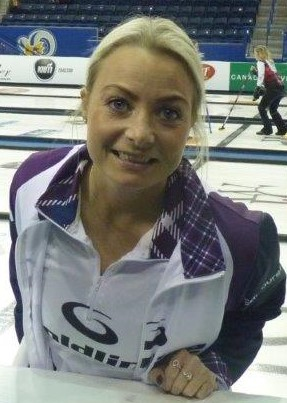
- Sloan at the 2017 Players' Championship
- Born: 5 February 1991 (age 35)

Curling career
- Member Association: Scotland; Great Britain
- World Championship: 6 (2011, 2012, 2013, 2015, 2016, 2017)
- European Championship: 8 (2010, 2011, 2012, 2013, 2014, 2015, 2016, 2017)
- Olympic: 2 (2014, 2018)
- Grand Slam victories: 5 (2013 Players', 2013 Autumn Gold, 2014 Colonial Square, 2014 Canadian Open, 2015 Players')
Medal record
Curling
Representing Great Britain
Olympic Games
Bronze medal – third place	2014 Sochi
Winter Universiade
Gold medal – first place	2011 Erzurum
Representing Scotland
World Championships
Gold medal – first place	2013 Riga
Bronze medal – third place	2017 Beijing
European Curling Championships
Gold medal – first place	2011 Moscow
Gold medal – first place	2017 St Gallen
Silver medal – second place	2010 Champéry
Silver medal – second place	2012 Karlstad
Silver medal – second place	2013 Stavanger
Silver medal – second place	2015 Esbjerg
Bronze medal – third place	2014 Champéry
Bronze medal – third place	2016 Braehead
Scottish Women's Curling Championship
Gold medal – first place	2011 Perth
Gold medal – first place	2012 Perth
Gold medal – first place	2013 Perth
Gold medal – first place	2015 Perth
Gold medal – first place	2016 Perth
Gold medal – first place	2017 Perth
World Junior Curling Championships
Gold medal – first place	2009 Vancouver
Gold medal – first place	2011 Perth

Anna Sloan (born 5 February 1991) is a Scottish curler. She was the longtime third for the Eve Muirhead rink. Representing Scotland, they won the 2011 European Championships, the 2013 World Championships, and the 2017 European Championships. Representing Great Britain, they won an Olympic bronze medal at the 2014 Sochi Games and finished fourth at the 2018 Pyeongchang Games.

== Career ==
Sloan played third for Eve Muirhead's junior rink, winning the 2009 World Junior Curling Championships for Scotland. In 2010, she won a silver medal at the European Championships as alternate to the Muirhead rink. At the same time, Sloan skipped her own ladies rink and defeated Muirhead's separate ladies rink en route to the 2011 Scottish Championships, defeating Hannah Fleming in the final. Before representing Scotland at her first World Championship, she won a second World Junior Championship playing third for the Muirhead junior rink. Two weeks later at the World Championships, she skipped Scotland to a ninth-place finish. In addition, Sloan has skipped Great Britain to gold medals at the 2009 European Youth Olympic Winter Festival and the 2011 Winter Universiade.

Since the 2011–2012 season, Sloan has played third for the Muirhead rink, winning the 2011 European Championships and 2013 World Championships, Scotland's first world title in the women's event since 2002. They are also the 2012 and 2013 European silver medallists. The 2013 Scottish world champion team of Muirhead, Sloan, Vicki Adams (second) and Claire Hamilton (lead) were selected to represent Great Britain at the 2014 Winter Olympics, where they won the bronze medal. At the 2018 Winter Olympics in Pyeongchang, with Sochi alternate Lauren Gray replacing Hamilton in lead, the team finished fourth. She decided to take a break from curling following the 2017-2018 season. Since taking a break from competitive sport she has pursued a career as a motivational speaker.

== Personal life ==
Sloan went to Glasgow Caledonian University, studying sport and active lifestyle promotion with the help of a Winning Student award. She lives in Stirling.
