= Marisa Winkelhausen =

Swiss curler (born 1988)

- Curler
- Born: Marisa Winklehausen; 3 June 1988 (age 38)

Team
- Curling club: CC Baden Regio, Baden, SUI

Curling career
- Member Association: Switzerland
- World Championship: 4 (2010, 2015, 2017, 2019)
- European Championship: 2 (2015, 2018)
Medal record
Women's curling
Representing Switzerland
World Curling Championships
Gold medal – first place	2015 Sapporo
Gold medal – first place	2019 Silkeborg
European Championships
Silver medal – second place	2018 Tallinn
World Junior Championships
Bronze medal – third place	2009 Vancouver
Winter Universiade
Bronze medal – third place	2013 Trentino

Marisa Winkelhausen (born 3 June 1988) is a Swiss curler from Bern. She is the former second for the Alina Pätz rink and with this rink won the 2015 World Women's Curling Championship.

== Career ==
As a junior curler, Winkelhausen played in the 2008 and 2009 World Junior Curling Championships. In 2008, she was the third on the Swiss team, skipped by Michèle Jäggi that finished in 6th place. And the 2009 World Juniors, Winkelhausen threw fourth stones for the Swiss team that was skipped my Martina Baumann. That team would win a bronze medal at the event.

Winkelhausen was the alternate on the Swiss team (skipped by Binia Feltscher-Beeli) at the 2010 Ford World Women's Curling Championship, finishing 10th.

In 2010, Winkelhausen re-joined the Jäggi rink at third, playing on that team until 2014. During this period, they won three World Curling Tour (WCT) events, the 2011 Kamloops Crown of Curling, the 2012 International Bernese Ladies Cup and the 2012 International ZO Women's Tournament. They played in their first Grand Slam event at the 2012 Curlers Corner Autumn Gold Curling Classic. They also played in the 2012 Colonial Square Ladies Classic, where they lost in the quarterfinals, the 2012 ROGERS Masters of Curling, the 2013 Players' Championship, the 2013 Curlers Corner Autumn Gold Curling Classic (losing in the quarterfinals), the 2013 Manitoba Liquor & Lotteries Women's Classic (quarterfinals), and the 2013 Colonial Square Ladies Classic, where they lost in the finals to Jennifer Jones.

While a student at the Swiss North-West University of Applied Sciences, Winkelhausen won a bronze medal at the 2013 Winter Universiade. She played third on the team, which was skipped by Jäggi.

Winkelhausen found success after joining the Pätz rink in 2014, playing second. The team won two WCT events in their first season together (the 2014 Red Deer Curling Classic and the 2015 International Bernese Ladies Cup.) They also made it to the quarterfinals of the 2014 Masters of Curling and also played in the 2014 Colonial Square Ladies Classic. The team won the Swiss championship and went on to win a gold medal at the 2015 World Women's Curling Championship. Later that year, she represented Switzerland at the 2015 European Curling Championships, where they missed the playoffs with a 4-5 record.

Winklehausen did not return to the World Championships until 2017. Playing second for Pätz, the team did not have the same success as in 2015 and ended up missing the playoffs after posting a 5-6 record and an 8th place finish. After that season, the Pätz rink announced they would be disbanding.

After Pätz joined the Tirinzoni rink the following season, Winklehausen was invited to be their alternate at the 2018 European Curling Championships. The Swiss team claimed the silver medal after going on an unbeaten 9–0 run to finish top of the Round Robin, before defeating Germany 6–4 in the semi-final, and falling 5–4 to Sweden's Anna Hasselborg in the final. She was also Tirinzoni's alternate at the 2019 World Women's Curling Championship in Silkeborg, Denmark. The team got off to a shaky start posting a 2–3 record in their first 5 games before winning 6 in a row to secure their playoff spot and went on to finish the round robin with a 8-4 record and 4th place in the standings. Tight victories over China in the qualification game, and South Korea in the semi-final set up a repeat of the European Championship final against Hasselborg and Sweden. They were able to turn the tables on Sweden, with Pätz making a draw to the four-foot in the extra end for an 8–7 win which meant they were crowned the 2019 world champions.
