= 2016 WFG Masters =

Grand Slam of Curling event

- Host city: Okotoks, Alberta
- Arena: Pason Centennial Arena
- Dates: October 25–30
- Men's winner: (Sweden) Team Edin
- Curling club: Karlstads CK, Karlstad, Sweden
- Skip: Niklas Edin
- Third: Oskar Eriksson
- Second: Rasmus Wranå
- Lead: Christoffer Sundgren
- Finalist: (Ontario) Brad Jacobs
- Women's winner: (Ontario) Team Flaxey
- Curling club: Guelph CC, Guelph, Ontario
- Skip: Allison Flaxey
- Third: Clancy Grandy
- Second: Lynn Kreviazuk
- Lead: Morgan Court
- Finalist: (Ontario) Rachel Homan

The 2016 WFG Masters was a curling bonspiel held from October 25 to 30, at the Pason Centennial Arena in Okotoks, Alberta. This was the first Grand Slam of the 2016–17 curling season.

On the men's side, the Niklas Edin rink from Karlstad, Sweden won their first Grand Slam event, and also became the first non-Canadian team to win a men's Grand Slam event. Edin defeated the defending Olympic champion, Brad Jacobs rink from Sault Ste. Marie, Ontario. The women's final was a battle of Ontario with Caledon's Allison Flaxey upsetting the World #1 Rachel Homan rink from Ottawa to win her first ever Grand Slam event.

The total purse for both the men's and women's event was $125,000 with the winner's share being $30,000. This is the largest purse in Masters history.

== Men ==
=== Teams ===
Skip	Third	Second	Lead	Locale
Brendan Bottcher	Pat Simmons	Brad Thiessen	Karrick Martin	Edmonton, Alberta
Reid Carruthers	Braeden Moskowy	Derek Samagalski	Colin Hodgson	Winnipeg, Manitoba
Benoît Schwarz (Fourth)	Claudio Pätz	Peter de Cruz (Skip)	Valentin Tanner	Geneva, Switzerland
Niklas Edin	Oskar Eriksson	Rasmus Wranå	Christoffer Sundgren	Karlstad, Sweden
John Epping	Mat Camm	Pat Janssen	Tim March	Toronto, Ontario
Glenn Howard	Richard Hart	David Mathers	Scott Howard	Penetanguishene, Ontario
Brad Jacobs	Ryan Fry	E. J. Harnden	Ryan Harnden	Sault Ste. Marie, Ontario
Kevin Koe	Marc Kennedy	Brent Laing	Ben Hebert	Calgary, Alberta
Steve Laycock	Kirk Muyres	Colton Flasch	Dallan Muyres	Saskatoon, Saskatchewan
Mike McEwen	B. J. Neufeld	Matt Wozniak	Denni Neufeld	Winnipeg, Manitoba
Jim Cotter (Fourth)	John Morris (Skip)	Tyrel Griffith	Rick Sawatsky	Vernon, British Columbia
David Murdoch	Greg Drummond	Scott Andrews	Michael Goodfellow	Stirling, Scotland
Mark Nichols	Charley Thomas	Brett Gallant	Geoff Walker	St. John's, Newfoundland and Labrador
John Shuster	Tyler George	Matt Hamilton	John Landsteiner	(United States) Duluth, Minnesota
Kyle Smith	Thomas Muirhead	Kyle Waddell	Cammy Smith	Stirling, Scotland

=== Round-robin standings ===
Final round-robin standings

Key
Teams to Playoffs
Teams to Tiebreakers

Pool A	W	L	PF	PA
(Newfoundland and Labrador) Mark Nichols	3	1	25	18
(Ontario) Brad Jacobs	3	1	19	15
(Sweden) Niklas Edin	3	1	23	12
(Alberta) Brendan Bottcher	1	3	19	29
(Ontario) Glenn Howard	0	4	11	23

Pool B	W	L	PF	PA
(Saskatchewan) Steve Laycock	4	0	30	13
(Ontario) John Epping	3	1	20	14
(Alberta) Kevin Koe	2	2	20	18
(Switzerland) Peter de Cruz	1	3	18	25
(United States) John Shuster	0	4	15	33

Pool C	W	L	PF	PA
(Manitoba) Reid Carruthers	3	1	23	14
(Manitoba) Mike McEwen	3	1	24	23
(Scotland) David Murdoch	2	2	20	19
(British Columbia) John Morris	1	3	20	25
(Scotland) Kyle Smith	1	3	19	25

=== Round-robin results ===
==== Draw 1 ====
Tuesday, October 25, 7:00 pm

Sheet D	1	2	3	4	5	6	7	8	Final
(Alberta) Kevin Koe 🔨	0	1	0	0	2	0	1	X	4
(Saskatchewan) Steve Laycock	0	0	2	2	0	3	0	X	7

Sheet E	1	2	3	4	5	6	7	8	Final
(British Columbia) John Morris	0	0	1	0	0	2	0	0	3
(Manitoba) Reid Carruthers 🔨	0	2	0	0	1	0	3	2	8

==== Draw 2 ====
Wednesday, October 26, 09:00 am

Sheet C	1	2	3	4	5	6	7	8	Final
(United States) John Shuster	0	1	0	3	1	0	0	X	5
(Switzerland) Peter de Cruz 🔨	5	0	1	0	0	2	1	X	9

Sheet D	1	2	3	4	5	6	7	8	Final
(Scotland) Kyle Smith	0	1	0	1	0	0	X	X	4
(Scotland) David Murdoch 🔨	3	0	4	0	1	1	X	X	9

==== Draw 3 ====
Wednesday, October 26, 12:30 pm

Sheet A	1	2	3	4	5	6	7	8	Final
(Sweden) Niklas Edin 🔨	0	0	0	0	1	0	1	0	2
(Ontario) Brad Jacobs	0	0	0	0	0	1	0	3	4

Sheet B	1	2	3	4	5	6	7	8	Final
(Newfoundland and Labrador) Mark Nichols 🔨	0	2	0	2	0	3	2	X	9
(Alberta) Brendan Bottcher	2	0	2	0	0	0	0	X	4

==== Draw 4 ====
Wednesday, October 26, 4:00 pm

Sheet A	1	2	3	4	5	6	7	8	Final
(Manitoba) Reid Carruthers 🔨	0	1	1	0	1	0	0	X	3
(Scotland) Kyle Smith	1	0	0	2	0	1	1	X	5

Sheet B	1	2	3	4	5	6	7	8	9	Final
(Manitoba) Mike McEwen	0	2	0	0	1	0	3	0	1	7
(British Columbia) John Morris 🔨	2	0	1	1	0	1	0	1	0	6

Sheet C	1	2	3	4	5	6	7	8	Final
(Ontario) John Epping 🔨	1	0	0	1	0	1	X	X	3
(Saskatchewan) Steve Laycock	0	2	0	0	4	0	X	X	6

==== Draw 5 ====
Wednesday, October 26, 7:30 pm

Sheet A	1	2	3	4	5	6	7	8	9	Final
(Ontario) Brad Jacobs 🔨	1	0	0	0	0	2	0	0	1	4
(Ontario) Glenn Howard	0	1	0	0	0	0	0	2	0	3

Sheet B	1	2	3	4	5	6	7	8	Final
(Alberta) Kevin Koe 🔨	2	0	1	0	2	0	2	X	7
(United States) John Shuster	0	1	0	1	0	1	0	X	3

==== Draw 6 ====
Thursday, October 27, 9:00 am

Sheet B	1	2	3	4	5	6	7	8	Final
(Alberta) Brendan Bottcher	0	1	0	3	1	0	2	0	7
(Ontario) Glenn Howard 🔨	1	0	1	0	0	1	0	X	3

Sheet C	1	2	3	4	5	6	7	8	Final
(Scotland) David Murdoch 🔨	1	0	0	2	0	1	0	1	5
(British Columbia) John Morris	0	0	2	0	1	0	1	0	4

Sheet D	1	2	3	4	5	6	7	8	Final
(Switzerland) Peter de Cruz 🔨	0	1	0	2	1	0	0	0	4
(Ontario) John Epping	1	0	1	0	0	1	1	1	5

==== Draw 7 ====
Thursday, October 27, 12:30 pm

Sheet A	1	2	3	4	5	6	7	8	Final
(Manitoba) Mike McEwen 🔨	0	0	0	0	2	0	3	0	5
(Manitoba) Reid Carruthers	1	0	3	1	0	1	0	1	7

Sheet B	1	2	3	4	5	6	7	8	Final
(Newfoundland and Labrador) Mark Nichols 🔨	0	2	1	0	0	1	0	1	5
(Ontario) Brad Jacobs	1	0	0	2	0	0	1	0	4

==== Draw 8 ====
Thursday, October 27, 4:00 pm

Sheet B	1	2	3	4	5	6	7	8	Final
(Saskatchewan) Steve Laycock 🔨	1	0	3	0	3	0	2	X	9
(United States) John Shuster	0	1	0	2	0	2	0	X	5

Sheet D	1	2	3	4	5	6	7	8	Final
(Sweden) Niklas Edin	2	0	1	0	5	2	X	X	10
(Alberta) Brendan Bottcher 🔨	0	2	0	1	0	0	X	X	3

==== Draw 9 ====
Thursday, October 27, 7:30 pm

Sheet C	1	2	3	4	5	6	7	8	Final
(Alberta) Kevin Koe	0	0	1	0	1	0	0	X	2
(Ontario) John Epping 🔨	0	1	0	1	0	0	2	X	4

Sheet D	1	2	3	4	5	6	7	8	Final
(Newfoundland and Labrador) Mark Nichols	0	2	1	0	1	0	3	X	7
(Ontario) Glenn Howard 🔨	1	0	0	1	0	2	0	X	4

Sheet E	1	2	3	4	5	6	7	8	Final
(Manitoba) Mike McEwen	0	2	0	1	0	1	0	2	6
(Scotland) Kyle Smith 🔨	2	0	1	0	1	0	1	0	5

==== Draw 10 ====
Friday, October 28, 9:00 am

Sheet B	1	2	3	4	5	6	7	8	Final
(Scotland) David Murdoch 🔨	0	1	0	0	0	0	0	X	1
(Manitoba) Reid Carruthers	1	0	0	0	0	0	4	X	5

Sheet C	1	2	3	4	5	6	7	8	Final
(Saskatchewan) Steve Laycock 🔨	1	0	0	2	3	2	X	X	8
(Switzerland) Peter de Cruz	0	1	0	0	0	0	X	X	1

Sheet D	1	2	3	4	5	6	7	8	Final
(Ontario) Glenn Howard 🔨	0	1	0	0	0	0	0	X	1
(Sweden) Niklas Edin	0	0	0	2	1	1	1	X	5

==== Draw 11 ====
Friday, October 28, 12:30 pm

Sheet B	1	2	3	4	5	6	7	8	Final
(British Columbia) John Morris 🔨	4	0	1	0	0	2	0	X	7
(Scotland) Kyle Smith	0	2	0	1	1	0	1	X	5

Sheet D	1	2	3	4	5	6	7	8	Final
(Ontario) Brad Jacobs	1	0	2	0	0	3	0	1	7
(Alberta) Brendan Bottcher 🔨	0	1	0	0	3	0	1	0	5

Sheet E	1	2	3	4	5	6	7	8	Final
(United States) John Shuster	0	1	0	1	0	X	X	X	2
(Ontario) John Epping 🔨	2	0	2	0	4	X	X	X	8

==== Draw 12 ====
Friday, October 28, 4:00 pm

Sheet B	1	2	3	4	5	6	7	8	Final
(Sweden) Niklas Edin 🔨	2	0	0	0	2	1	0	1	6
(Newfoundland and Labrador) Mark Nichols	0	1	1	1	0	0	1	0	4

Sheet D	1	2	3	4	5	6	7	8	9	Final
(Manitoba) Mike McEwen 🔨	3	1	0	0	0	0	1	0	1	6
(Scotland) David Murdoch	0	0	0	2	1	0	0	2	0	5

Sheet E	1	2	3	4	5	6	7	8	Final
(Alberta) Kevin Koe	3	0	0	1	1	0	1	1	7
(Switzerland) Peter de Cruz 🔨	0	2	0	0	0	2	0	0	4

=== Tiebreaker ===
Friday, October 28, 7:30 pm

Team	1	2	3	4	5	6	7	8	Final
(Scotland) David Murdoch 🔨	1	0	2	0	3	1	X	X	7
(Alberta) Kevin Koe	0	1	0	2	0	0	X	X	3

Player percentages
(Scotland) Team Murdoch		(Alberta) Team Koe	
Michael Goodfellow	90%	Ben Hebert	92%
Scott Andrews	79%	Brent Laing	93%
Greg Drummond	90%	Marc Kennedy	86%
David Murdoch	100%	Kevin Koe	71%
Total	90%	Total	86%

=== Playoffs ===
Quarterfinals
1	(Saskatchewan) Steve Laycock	5
8	(Scotland) David Murdoch	3
4	(Newfoundland and Labrador) Mark Nichols	5
5	(Ontario) Brad Jacobs	6
2	(Ontario) John Epping	4
7	(Sweden) Niklas Edin	6
3	(Manitoba) Reid Carruthers	5
6	(Manitoba) Mike McEwen	3

Semifinals
1	(Saskatchewan) Steve Laycock	4
5	(Ontario) Brad Jacobs	5
7	(Sweden) Niklas Edin	8
3	(Manitoba) Reid Carruthers	3

Final
5	(Ontario) Brad Jacobs	4
7	(Sweden) Niklas Edin	5

==== Quarterfinals ====
Saturday, October 29, 11:00 am

Team	1	2	3	4	5	6	7	8	Final
(Saskatchewan) Steve Laycock 🔨	0	1	0	2	1	0	1	0	5
(Scotland) David Murdoch	0	0	1	0	0	1	0	1	3

Player percentages
(Saskatchewan) Team Laycock		(Scotland) Team Murdoch	
Dallan Muyres	84%	Michael Goodfellow	87%
Colton Flasch	84%	Scott Andrews	77%
Kirk Muyres	88%	Greg Drummond	83%
Steve Laycock	88%	David Murdoch	70%
Total	86%	Total	79%

Team	1	2	3	4	5	6	7	8	Final
(Newfoundland and Labrador) Mark Nichols 🔨	1	0	0	0	2	0	2	0	5
(Ontario) Brad Jacobs	0	0	1	1	0	2	0	2	6

Player percentages
(Newfoundland and Labrador) Team Nichols		(Ontario) Team Jacobs	
Geoff Walker	84%	Ryan Harnden	86%
Brett Gallant	79%	E. J. Harnden	75%
Charley Thomas	82%	Ryan Fry	70%
Mark Nichols	64%	Brad Jacobs	75%
Total	77%	Total	77%

Team	1	2	3	4	5	6	7	8	Final
(Ontario) John Epping 🔨	1	0	0	0	1	0	2	0	4
(Sweden) Niklas Edin	0	2	0	1	0	2	0	1	6

Player percentages
(Ontario) Team Epping		(Sweden) Team Edin	
Tim March	85%	Christoffer Sundgren	96%
Pat Janssen	76%	Rasmus Wranå	81%
Mat Camm	86%	Oskar Eriksson	85%
John Epping	70%	Niklas Edin	84%
Total	79%	Total	87%

Team	1	2	3	4	5	6	7	8	Final
(Manitoba) Reid Carruthers	0	1	2	0	0	0	2	X	5
(Manitoba) Mike McEwen 🔨	1	0	0	0	2	0	0	X	3

Player percentages
(Manitoba) Team Carruthers		(Manitoba) Team McEwen	
Colin Hodgson	78%	Denni Neufeld	89%
Derek Samagalski	86%	Matt Wozniak	78%
Braeden Moskowy	80%	B. J. Neufeld	91%
Reid Carruthers	88%	Mike McEwen	65%
Total	83%	Total	81%

==== Semifinals ====
Saturday, October 29, 7:00 pm

Team	1	2	3	4	5	6	7	8	9	Final
(Saskatchewan) Steve Laycock 🔨	0	2	0	0	0	0	0	2	0	4
(Ontario) Brad Jacobs	1	0	0	0	2	0	1	0	1	5

Player percentages
(Saskatchewan) Team Laycock		(Ontario) Team Jacobs	
Dallan Muyres	90%	Ryan Harnden	78%
Colton Flasch	82%	E.J. Harnden	72%
Kirk Muyres	79%	Ryan Fry	76%
Steve Laycock	67%	Brad Jacobs	83%
Total	80%	Total	77%

Team	1	2	3	4	5	6	7	8	Final
(Sweden) Niklas Edin 🔨	1	0	0	3	1	0	3	X	8
(Manitoba) Reid Carruthers	0	2	0	0	0	1	0	X	3

Player percentages
(Sweden) Team Edin		(Manitoba) Team Carruthers	
Christoffer Sundgren	82%	Colin Hodgson	94%
Rasmus Wranå	81%	Derek Samagalski	73%
Oskar Eriksson	92%	Braeden Moskowy	83%
Niklas Edin	90%	Reid Carruthers	83%
Total	86%	Total	83%

==== Final ====
Sunday, October 30, 11:00 am

Sheet C	1	2	3	4	5	6	7	8	9	Final
(Ontario) Brad Jacobs 🔨	0	0	0	1	1	0	2	0	0	4
(Sweden) Niklas Edin	1	0	0	0	0	1	0	2	1	5

Player percentages
(Ontario) Team Jacobs		(Sweden) Team Edin	
Ryan Harnden	78%	Christoffer Sundgren	86%
E.J. Harnden	71%	Rasmus Wranå	78%
Ryan Fry	74%	Oskar Eriksson	76%
Brad Jacobs	79%	Niklas Edin	84%
Total	75%	Total	81%

== Women ==
=== Teams ===
Skip	Third	Second	Lead	Locale
Chelsea Carey	Amy Nixon	Jocelyn Peterman	Laine Peters	Calgary, Alberta
Kerri Einarson	Selena Kaatz	Liz Fyfe	Kristin MacCuish	Winnipeg, Manitoba
Binia Feltscher	Irene Schori	Franziska Kaufmann	Christine Urech	Flims, Switzerland
Allison Flaxey	Clancy Grandy	Lynn Kreviazuk	Morgan Court	Caledon, Ontario
Tracy Fleury	Crystal Webster	Jenna Walsh	Jennifer Wylie	Sudbury, Ontario
Anna Hasselborg	Sara McManus	Agnes Knochenhauer	Sofia Mabergs	Sundbyberg, Sweden
Rachel Homan	Emma Miskew	Joanne Courtney	Lisa Weagle	Ottawa, Ontario
Jennifer Jones	Kaitlyn Lawes	Jill Officer	Dawn McEwen	Winnipeg, Manitoba
Kim Eun-jung	Kim Kyeong-ae	Kim Seon-yeong	Kim Yeong-mi	Uiseong, South Korea
Eve Muirhead	Anna Sloan	Vicki Adams	Lauren Gray	Stirling, Scotland
Alina Pätz	Nadine Lehmann	Marisa Winkelhausen	Nicole Schwägli	Zürich, Switzerland
Kelsey Rocque	Laura Crocker	Taylor McDonald	Jen Gates	Edmonton, Alberta
Anna Sidorova	Margarita Fomina	Alexandra Raeva	Nkeiruka Ezekh	Moscow, Russia
Val Sweeting	Lori Olson-Johns	Dana Ferguson	Rachelle Brown	Edmonton, Alberta
Silvana Tirinzoni	Manuela Siegrist	Esther Neuenschwander	Marlene Albrecht	Zürich, Switzerland

=== Round-robin standings ===
Final round-robin standings

Key
Teams to Playoffs
Teams to Tiebreakers

Pool A	W	L	PF	PA
(South Korea) Kim Eun-jung	4	0	26	14
(Ontario) Rachel Homan	3	1	24	20
(Scotland) Eve Muirhead	1	3	25	21
(Switzerland) Alina Pätz	1	3	12	23
(Alberta) Kelsey Rocque	1	3	17	26

Pool B	W	L	PF	PA
(Switzerland) Binia Feltscher	3	1	25	23
(Manitoba) Jennifer Jones	2	2	26	27
(Alberta) Chelsea Carey	2	2	19	22
(Ontario) Allison Flaxey	2	2	26	27
(Russia) Anna Sidorova	1	3	25	22

Pool C	W	L	PF	PA
(Sweden) Anna Hasselborg	4	0	27	20
(Switzerland) Silvana Tirinzoni	3	1	24	17
(Manitoba) Kerri Einarson	2	2	21	20
(Ontario) Tracy Fleury	1	3	20	25
(Alberta) Val Sweeting	0	4	15	25

=== Round-robin results ===
==== Draw 1 ====
Tuesday, October 25, 7:00 pm

Sheet A	1	2	3	4	5	6	7	8	Final
(Alberta) Chelsea Carey 🔨	0	1	0	0	1	1	0	1	4
(Russia) Anna Sidorova	1	0	0	1	0	0	1	0	3

Sheet B	1	2	3	4	5	6	7	8	Final
(Alberta) Kelsey Rocque 🔨	0	4	0	1	1	1	X	X	7
(Switzerland) Alina Pätz	0	0	1	0	0	0	X	X	1

==== Draw 2 ====
Wednesday, October 26, 9:00 am

Sheet A	1	2	3	4	5	6	7	8	9	Final
(Manitoba) Kerri Einarson 🔨	0	2	0	2	0	0	1	0	0	5
(Sweden) Anna Hasselborg	1	0	2	0	0	1	0	1	1	6

Sheet B	1	2	3	4	5	6	7	8	Final
(Scotland) Eve Muirhead	2	0	0	0	0	2	0	1	5
(South Korea) Kim Eun-jung 🔨	0	1	1	2	1	0	1	0	6

==== Draw 3 ====
Wednesday, October 26, 12:30 pm

Sheet A	1	2	3	4	5	6	7	8	Final
(Alberta) Val Sweeting 🔨	1	0	0	0	1	1	1	X	4
(Ontario) Tracy Fleury	0	3	3	1	0	0	0	X	7

Sheet B	1	2	3	4	5	6	7	8	Final
(Ontario) Rachel Homan 🔨	1	1	0	1	0	0	1	1	5
(Switzerland) Alina Pätz	0	0	1	0	0	2	0	0	3

Sheet E	1	2	3	4	5	6	7	8	Final
(Manitoba) Jennifer Jones	0	0	1	0	1	0	4	0	6
(Ontario) Allison Flaxey 🔨	2	1	0	2	0	2	0	2	9

==== Draw 4 ====
Wednesday, October 26, 4:00 pm

Sheet C	1	2	3	4	5	6	7	8	Final
(Alberta) Chelsea Carey	0	1	1	0	2	1	0	2	7
(Switzerland) Binia Feltscher 🔨	3	0	0	1	0	0	1	0	5

Sheet D	1	2	3	4	5	6	7	8	Final
(Switzerland) Silvana Tirinzoni 🔨	0	0	3	0	2	1	0	X	6
(Manitoba) Kerri Einarson	0	0	0	2	0	0	1	X	3

==== Draw 5 ====
Wednesday, October 26, 7:30 pm

Sheet B	1	2	3	4	5	6	7	8	Final
(Manitoba) Jennifer Jones 🔨	0	3	2	0	1	0	2	1	9
(Russia) Anna Sidorova	2	0	0	2	0	3	0	0	7

Sheet C	1	2	3	4	5	6	7	8	Final
(Alberta) Val Sweeting	0	0	1	0	2	0	1	1	5
(Sweden) Anna Hasselborg 🔨	0	2	0	3	0	1	0	0	6

Sheet E	1	2	3	4	5	6	7	8	9	Final
(Ontario) Rachel Homan 🔨	3	1	0	0	1	0	1	0	1	7
(Alberta) Kelsey Rocque	0	0	1	3	0	1	0	1	0	6

==== Draw 6 ====
Thursday, October 27, 9:00 am

Sheet B	1	2	3	4	5	6	7	8	Final
(Switzerland) Binia Feltscher	0	1	0	2	0	0	4	1	8
(Ontario) Allison Flaxey 🔨	1	0	1	0	2	2	0	0	6

==== Draw 7 ====
Thursday, October 27, 12:30 pm

Sheet A	1	2	3	4	5	6	7	8	Final
(South Korea) Kim Eun-jung	0	1	0	3	2	1	1	X	8
(Alberta) Kelsey Rocque 🔨	1	0	1	0	0	0	0	X	2

Sheet B	1	2	3	4	5	6	7	8	Final
(Ontario) Tracy Fleury	0	0	3	0	0	2	0	0	5
(Sweden) Anna Hasselborg 🔨	2	1	0	1	2	0	0	1	7

Sheet C	1	2	3	4	5	6	7	8	Final
(Scotland) Eve Muirhead 🔨	1	0	0	2	0	2	0	0	5
(Switzerland) Alina Pätz	0	2	0	0	2	0	1	1	6

==== Draw 8 ====
Thursday, October 27, 4:00 pm

Sheet B	1	2	3	4	5	6	7	8	Final
(Manitoba) Jennifer Jones	0	1	0	0	1	2	0	2	6
(Alberta) Chelsea Carey 🔨	1	0	2	1	0	0	1	0	5

Sheet C	1	2	3	4	5	6	7	8	Final
(Ontario) Allison Flaxey	0	0	3	0	0	0	0	X	3
(Russia) Anna Sidorova 🔨	1	0	0	1	0	2	6	X	10

Sheet D	1	2	3	4	5	6	7	8	Final
(Alberta) Val Sweeting 🔨	1	0	1	1	0	0	0	X	3
(Switzerland) Silvana Tirinzoni	0	2	0	0	1	1	2	X	6

==== Draw 9 ====
Thursday, October 27, 7:30 pm

Sheet C	1	2	3	4	5	6	7	8	Final
(Ontario) Rachel Homan	0	0	2	0	1	0	1	1	5
(South Korea) Kim Eun-jung 🔨	2	1	0	1	0	2	0	0	6

Sheet E	1	2	3	4	5	6	7	8	Final
(Manitoba) Kerri Einarson 🔨	2	3	0	0	0	1	0	1	7
(Ontario) Tracy Fleury	0	0	1	1	2	0	1	0	5

==== Draw 10 ====
Friday, October 28, 9:00 am

Sheet B	1	2	3	4	5	6	7	8	Final
(Scotland) Eve Muirhead 🔨	3	0	0	4	0	3	X	X	10
(Alberta) Kelsey Rocque	0	1	0	0	1	0	X	X	2

Sheet C	1	2	3	4	5	6	7	8	Final
(Russia) Anna Sidorova	0	1	0	0	0	0	4	0	5
(Switzerland) Binia Feltscher 🔨	1	0	0	0	3	1	0	1	6

==== Draw 11 ====
Friday, October 28, 12:30 pm

Sheet A	1	2	3	4	5	6	7	8	Final
(Sweden) Anna Hasselborg	0	0	2	1	0	4	1	X	8
(Switzerland) Silvana Tirinzoni 🔨	0	3	0	0	2	0	0	X	5

Sheet E	1	2	3	4	5	6	7	8	Final
(Alberta) Chelsea Carey	0	1	0	0	1	1	0	X	3
(Ontario) Allison Flaxey 🔨	3	0	0	2	0	0	3	X	8

==== Draw 12 ====
Friday, October 28, 4:00 pm

Sheet A	1	2	3	4	5	6	7	8	Final
(Alberta) Val Sweeting	0	0	0	1	0	2	0	X	3
(Manitoba) Kerri Einarson 🔨	0	0	1	0	3	0	2	X	6

Sheet C	1	2	3	4	5	6	7	8	Final
(Ontario) Rachel Homan 🔨	2	0	3	0	1	0	0	1	7
(Scotland) Eve Muirhead	0	2	0	2	0	1	0	0	5

==== Draw 13 ====
Friday, October 28, 7:30 pm

Sheet B	1	2	3	4	5	6	7	8	Final
(Switzerland) Alina Pätz 🔨	0	1	0	0	0	1	X	X	2
(South Korea) Kim Eun-jung	1	0	1	1	3	0	X	X	6

Sheet C	1	2	3	4	5	6	7	8	Final
(Ontario) Tracy Fleury 🔨	1	0	0	1	0	1	0	X	3
(Switzerland) Silvana Tirinzoni	0	0	2	0	2	0	3	X	7

Sheet D	1	2	3	4	5	6	7	8	9	Final
(Manitoba) Jennifer Jones	0	1	0	0	1	0	2	1	0	5
(Switzerland) Binia Feltscher 🔨	2	0	0	2	0	1	0	0	1	6

=== Tiebreaker ===
Saturday, October 29, 9:30 am

Team	1	2	3	4	5	6	7	8	Final
(Manitoba) Kerri Einarson 🔨	1	0	1	0	0	0	0	X	2
(Ontario) Allison Flaxey	0	1	0	1	1	2	1	X	6

Player percentages
(Manitoba) Team Einarson		(Ontario) Team Flaxey	
Kristin MacCuish	80%	Morgan Court	72%
Liz Fyfe	76%	Lynn Kreviazuk	67%
Selena Kaatz	70%	Clancy Grandy	86%
Kerri Einarson	62%	Allison Flaxey	88%
Total	72%	Total	78%

=== Playoffs ===
Quarterfinals
1	(South Korea) Kim Eun-jung	2
8	(Ontario) Allison Flaxey	8
4	(Switzerland) Binia Feltscher	3
5	(Switzerland) Silvana Tirinzoni	6
2	(Sweden) Anna Hasselborg	6
7	(Alberta) Chelsea Carey	4
3	(Ontario) Rachel Homan	7
6	(Manitoba) Jennifer Jones	5

Semifinals
8	(Ontario) Allison Flaxey	8
5	(Switzerland) Silvana Tirinzoni	1
2	(Sweden) Anna Hasselborg	4
3	(Ontario) Rachel Homan	7

Final
8	(Ontario) Allison Flaxey	6
3	(Ontario) Rachel Homan	3

==== Quarterfinals ====
Saturday, October 29, 3:00 pm

Team	1	2	3	4	5	6	7	8	Final
(South Korea) Kim Eun-jung 🔨	0	1	0	1	0	0	0	X	2
(Ontario) Allison Flaxey	2	0	1	0	2	1	2	X	8

Player percentages
(South Korea) Team Kim		(Ontario) Team Flaxey	
Kim Yeong-mi	71%	Morgan Court	75%
Kim Seon-yeong	86%	Lynn Kreviazuk	79%
Kim Kyeong-ae	89%	Clancy Grandy	60%
Kim Eun-jung	50%	Allison Flaxey	78%
Total	74%	Total	73%

Team	1	2	3	4	5	6	7	8	Final
(Switzerland) Binia Feltscher 🔨	1	0	0	1	0	0	1	0	3
(Switzerland) Silvana Tirinzoni	0	0	1	0	1	2	0	2	6

Player percentages
(Switzerland) Team Feltscher		(Switzerland) Team Tirinzoni	
Christine Urech	84%	Marlene Albrecht	83%
Franziska Kaufmann	65%	Esther Neuenschwander	80%
Irene Schori	59%	Manuela Siegrist	78%
Binia Feltscher	83%	Silvana Tirinzoni	96%
Total	73%	Total	84%

Team	1	2	3	4	5	6	7	8	Final
(Sweden) Anna Hasselborg 🔨	1	0	0	3	0	1	1	0	6
(Alberta) Chelsea Carey	0	1	0	0	2	0	0	1	4

Player percentages
(Sweden) Team Hasselborg		(Alberta) Team Carey	
Sofia Mabergs	93%	Laine Peters	80%
Agnes Knochenhauer	71%	Jocelyn Peterman	60%
Sara McManus	73%	Amy Nixon	78%
Anna Hasselborg	84%	Chelsea Carey	65%
Total	80%	Total	71%

Team	1	2	3	4	5	6	7	8	9	Final
(Ontario) Rachel Homan 🔨	0	0	0	1	0	2	0	2	2	7
(Manitoba) Jennifer Jones	1	0	1	0	2	0	1	0	0	5

Player percentages
(Ontario) Team Homan		(Manitoba) Team Jones	
Lisa Weagle	83%	Dawn McEwen	79%
Joanne Courtney	57%	Jill Officer	80%
Emma Miskew	75%	Kaitlyn Lawes	91%
Rachel Homan	85%	Jennifer Jones	70%
Total	75%	Total	80%

==== Semifinals ====
Saturday, October 29, 7:00 pm

Team	1	2	3	4	5	6	7	8	Final
(Ontario) Allison Flaxey	0	1	2	4	0	1	X	X	8
(Switzerland) Silvana Tirinzoni 🔨	0	0	0	0	1	0	X	X	1

Player percentages
(Ontario) Team Flaxey		(Switzerland) Team Tirinzoni	
Morgan Court	69%	Marlene Albrecht	79%
Lynn Kreviazuk	93%	Esther Neuenschwander	82%
Clancy Grandy	84%	Manuela Siegrist	65%
Allison Flaxey	89%	Silvana Tirinzoni	62%
Total	84%	Total	72%

Team	1	2	3	4	5	6	7	8	Final
(Sweden) Anna Hasselborg 🔨	3	0	0	1	0	0	0	0	4
(Ontario) Rachel Homan	0	2	1	0	2	0	1	1	7

Player percentages
(Sweden) Team Hasselborg		(Ontario) Team Homan	
Sofia Mabergs	87%	Lisa Weagle	76%
Agnes Knochenhauer	78%	Joanne Courtney	72%
Sara McManus	72%	Emma Miskew	79%
Anna Hasselborg	51%	Rachel Homan	83%
Total	72%	Total	77%

==== Final ====
Sunday, October 30, 3:00 pm

Sheet C	1	2	3	4	5	6	7	8	Final
(Ontario) Allison Flaxey	1	0	0	0	4	0	1	X	6
(Ontario) Rachel Homan 🔨	0	1	0	1	0	1	0	X	3

Player percentages
(Ontario) Team Flaxey		(Ontario) Team Homan	
Morgan Court	80%	Lisa Weagle	85%
Lynn Kreviazuk	82%	Joanne Courtney	72%
Clancy Grandy	84%	Emma Miskew	70%
Allison Flaxey	75%	Rachel Homan	74%
Total	80%	Total	75%
