= 2012 Scottish Men's Curling Championship =

2012 Co-operative Funeralcare Scottish Men's Curling Championship
- Host city: Perth, Scotland
- Arena: Dewars Centre
- Dates: February 13–19
- Winner: Tom Brewster
- Curling club: Curl Aberdeen, Aberdeen
- Skip: Tom Brewster
- Third: Greg Drummond
- Second: Scott Andrews
- Lead: Michael Goodfellow
- Finalist: David Smith

The 2012 Co-operative Funeralcare Scottish Men's Curling Championship was held from February 13 to 19 at the Dewars Centre in Perth, Scotland. It was held in conjunction with the 2012 Scottish Women's Curling Championship. The winner of the championship, Tom Brewster, represented Scotland at the 2012 Capital One World Men's Curling Championship in Basel, Switzerland.

== Teams ==
The teams are listed as follows:

| Skip | Third | Second | Lead | Locale |
|---|---|---|---|---|
| David Edwards | John Penny | Scott MacLeod | Colin Campbell | Aberdeen |
| Ewan MacDonald | Graeme Connal | Peter Loudon | Euan Byers | Inverness |
| John Hamilton | Phil Garden | Jamie Dick | Graeme Copland | Murrayfield |
| David Murdoch | Glen Muirhead | Ross Paterson | Richard Woods | Lockerbie |
| David Smith | Warwick Smith | Alan Smith | Ross Hepburn | Perth |
| Logan Gray | Alasdair Guthrie | Steven Mitchell | Sandy Gilmour | Stirling |
| Tom Brewster | Greg Drummond | Scott Andrews | Michael Goodfellow | Aberdeen |
| Graeme Black | Scott Hamilton | Colin Howden | Alan Marshall | Lockerbie |
| Jay McWilliam | Colin Dick | Grant Hardie | Billy Morton | Stranraer |
| Murray Young | Stuart Taylor | Cammy Smith | Angus Dowell | Forfar |

== Round-robin standings ==
Final round-robin standings

Key
| Teams to Playoffs |
| Teams to Tiebreakers |

| Skip | W | L |
|---|---|---|
| David Edwards | 8 | 1 |
| David Smith | 6 | 3 |
| Tom Brewster | 6 | 3 |
| Ewan MacDonald | 5 | 4 |
| Jay McWilliam | 5 | 4 |
| David Murdoch | 5 | 4 |
| Logan Gray | 4 | 5 |
| Graeme Black | 3 | 6 |
| John Hamilton | 2 | 7 |
| Murray Young | 1 | 8 |

== Round-robin results ==
All times listed in Western European Time (UTC+0).

=== Draw 1 ===
Monday, February 13, 4:15 pm

| Sheet 1 | 1 | 2 | 3 | 4 | 5 | 6 | 7 | 8 | 9 | 10 | Final |
|---|---|---|---|---|---|---|---|---|---|---|---|
| Murray Young | 0 | 0 | 1 | 0 | 1 | 0 | 0 | 1 | 0 | X | 3 |
| David Smith | 0 | 1 | 0 | 2 | 0 | 0 | 2 | 0 | 2 | X | 7 |

| Sheet 2 | 1 | 2 | 3 | 4 | 5 | 6 | 7 | 8 | 9 | 10 | Final |
|---|---|---|---|---|---|---|---|---|---|---|---|
| Tom Brewster | 1 | 0 | 0 | 0 | 0 | 1 | 0 | 1 | 0 | X | 3 |
| Jay McWilliam | 0 | 0 | 0 | 2 | 1 | 0 | 1 | 0 | 1 | X | 5 |

| Sheet 3 | 1 | 2 | 3 | 4 | 5 | 6 | 7 | 8 | 9 | 10 | Final |
|---|---|---|---|---|---|---|---|---|---|---|---|
| Logan Gray | 0 | 0 | 0 | 0 | 0 | 2 | 0 | 0 | X | X | 2 |
| John Hamilton | 0 | 1 | 1 | 1 | 0 | 0 | 1 | 3 | X | X | 7 |

| Sheet 4 | 1 | 2 | 3 | 4 | 5 | 6 | 7 | 8 | 9 | 10 | Final |
|---|---|---|---|---|---|---|---|---|---|---|---|
| Ewan MacDonald | 0 | 0 | 2 | 0 | 1 | 0 | 1 | 0 | 0 | X | 4 |
| David Edwards | 0 | 1 | 0 | 1 | 0 | 2 | 0 | 3 | 2 | X | 9 |

| Sheet 5 | 1 | 2 | 3 | 4 | 5 | 6 | 7 | 8 | 9 | 10 | Final |
|---|---|---|---|---|---|---|---|---|---|---|---|
| Graeme Black | 1 | 0 | 1 | 0 | 0 | 0 | 2 | 0 | 0 | 0 | 4 |
| David Murdoch | 0 | 2 | 0 | 2 | 0 | 0 | 0 | 1 | 1 | 1 | 7 |

=== Draw 2 ===
Tuesday, February 14, 8:00 am

| Sheet 1 | 1 | 2 | 3 | 4 | 5 | 6 | 7 | 8 | 9 | 10 | Final |
|---|---|---|---|---|---|---|---|---|---|---|---|
| Graeme Black | 2 | 0 | 0 | 0 | 1 | 0 | X | X | X | X | 3 |
| Tom Brewster | 0 | 5 | 2 | 3 | 0 | 1 | X | X | X | X | 11 |

| Sheet 2 | 1 | 2 | 3 | 4 | 5 | 6 | 7 | 8 | 9 | 10 | Final |
|---|---|---|---|---|---|---|---|---|---|---|---|
| John Hamilton | 0 | 0 | 1 | 0 | 0 | 1 | 0 | 1 | 0 | X | 3 |
| David Murdoch | 2 | 0 | 0 | 2 | 0 | 0 | 1 | 0 | 1 | X | 6 |

| Sheet 3 | 1 | 2 | 3 | 4 | 5 | 6 | 7 | 8 | 9 | 10 | Final |
|---|---|---|---|---|---|---|---|---|---|---|---|
| Murray Young | 1 | 0 | 0 | 0 | 2 | 0 | 3 | 1 | 0 | 1 | 8 |
| Ewan MacDonald | 0 | 1 | 0 | 1 | 0 | 1 | 0 | 0 | 2 | 0 | 5 |

| Sheet 4 | 1 | 2 | 3 | 4 | 5 | 6 | 7 | 8 | 9 | 10 | 11 | Final |
|---|---|---|---|---|---|---|---|---|---|---|---|---|
| Logan Gray | 1 | 1 | 1 | 0 | 0 | 1 | 0 | 1 | 1 | 0 | 0 | 6 |
| David Smith | 0 | 0 | 0 | 2 | 1 | 0 | 2 | 0 | 0 | 1 | 1 | 7 |

| Sheet 5 | 1 | 2 | 3 | 4 | 5 | 6 | 7 | 8 | 9 | 10 | Final |
|---|---|---|---|---|---|---|---|---|---|---|---|
| Jay McWilliam | 0 | 0 | 0 | 2 | 0 | 0 | 0 | 0 | 0 | X | 2 |
| David Edwards | 2 | 1 | 0 | 0 | 0 | 1 | 0 | 0 | 1 | X | 5 |

=== Draw 3 ===
Tuesday, February 14, 4:00 pm

| Sheet 1 | 1 | 2 | 3 | 4 | 5 | 6 | 7 | 8 | 9 | 10 | Final |
|---|---|---|---|---|---|---|---|---|---|---|---|
| David Edwards | 1 | 0 | 1 | 0 | 2 | 0 | 2 | 0 | 0 | 1 | 7 |
| David Murdoch | 0 | 0 | 0 | 1 | 0 | 2 | 0 | 1 | 1 | 0 | 5 |

| Sheet 2 | 1 | 2 | 3 | 4 | 5 | 6 | 7 | 8 | 9 | 10 | Final |
|---|---|---|---|---|---|---|---|---|---|---|---|
| David Smith | 0 | 2 | 0 | 0 | 1 | 1 | 0 | 2 | 1 | 0 | 7 |
| Ewan MacDonald | 0 | 0 | 0 | 4 | 0 | 0 | 2 | 0 | 0 | 2 | 8 |

| Sheet 3 | 1 | 2 | 3 | 4 | 5 | 6 | 7 | 8 | 9 | 10 | Final |
|---|---|---|---|---|---|---|---|---|---|---|---|
| Jay McWilliam | 1 | 0 | 1 | 0 | 1 | 0 | 1 | 0 | X | X | 4 |
| Graeme Black | 0 | 2 | 0 | 1 | 0 | 4 | 0 | 3 | X | X | 10 |

| Sheet 4 | 1 | 2 | 3 | 4 | 5 | 6 | 7 | 8 | 9 | 10 | 11 | Final |
|---|---|---|---|---|---|---|---|---|---|---|---|---|
| John Hamilton | 0 | 2 | 0 | 2 | 1 | 0 | 1 | 0 | 1 | 0 | 1 | 8 |
| Murray Young | 0 | 0 | 1 | 0 | 0 | 1 | 0 | 2 | 0 | 3 | 0 | 7 |

| Sheet 5 | 1 | 2 | 3 | 4 | 5 | 6 | 7 | 8 | 9 | 10 | Final |
|---|---|---|---|---|---|---|---|---|---|---|---|
| Logan Gray | 0 | 2 | 0 | 1 | 1 | 0 | 1 | 3 | X | X | 8 |
| Tom Brewster | 0 | 0 | 1 | 0 | 0 | 0 | 0 | 0 | X | X | 1 |

=== Draw 4 ===
Wednesday, February 15, 12:00 pm

| Sheet 1 | 1 | 2 | 3 | 4 | 5 | 6 | 7 | 8 | 9 | 10 | Final |
|---|---|---|---|---|---|---|---|---|---|---|---|
| David Smith | 2 | 0 | 2 | 0 | 0 | 2 | 0 | 1 | 0 | X | 7 |
| Jay McWilliam | 0 | 1 | 0 | 0 | 1 | 0 | 1 | 0 | 2 | X | 5 |

| Sheet 2 | 1 | 2 | 3 | 4 | 5 | 6 | 7 | 8 | 9 | 10 | Final |
|---|---|---|---|---|---|---|---|---|---|---|---|
| Logan Gray | 3 | 1 | 1 | 0 | 0 | 2 | 0 | 4 | X | X | 11 |
| Murray Young | 0 | 0 | 0 | 1 | 1 | 0 | 1 | 0 | X | X | 3 |

| Sheet 3 | 1 | 2 | 3 | 4 | 5 | 6 | 7 | 8 | 9 | 10 | Final |
|---|---|---|---|---|---|---|---|---|---|---|---|
| Tom Brewster | 0 | 0 | 0 | 1 | 0 | 0 | 1 | 1 | 0 | 3 | 6 |
| David Murdoch | 0 | 1 | 0 | 0 | 0 | 0 | 0 | 0 | 1 | 0 | 2 |

| Sheet 4 | 1 | 2 | 3 | 4 | 5 | 6 | 7 | 8 | 9 | 10 | Final |
|---|---|---|---|---|---|---|---|---|---|---|---|
| David Edwards | 0 | 0 | 0 | 2 | 0 | 2 | 0 | 2 | 0 | 0 | 6 |
| Graeme Black | 0 | 0 | 2 | 0 | 1 | 0 | 1 | 0 | 0 | 1 | 5 |

| Sheet 5 | 1 | 2 | 3 | 4 | 5 | 6 | 7 | 8 | 9 | 10 | Final |
|---|---|---|---|---|---|---|---|---|---|---|---|
| Ewan MacDonald | 2 | 0 | 1 | 1 | 0 | 3 | 2 | X | X | X | 9 |
| John Hamilton | 0 | 1 | 0 | 0 | 1 | 0 | 0 | X | X | X | 2 |

=== Draw 5 ===
Wednesday, February 15, 8:00 pm

| Sheet 1 | 1 | 2 | 3 | 4 | 5 | 6 | 7 | 8 | 9 | 10 | Final |
|---|---|---|---|---|---|---|---|---|---|---|---|
| Logan Gray | 0 | 0 | 1 | 1 | 0 | 1 | 0 | 2 | 0 | 2 | 7 |
| Graeme Black | 0 | 1 | 0 | 0 | 3 | 0 | 1 | 0 | 1 | 0 | 6 |

| Sheet 2 | 1 | 2 | 3 | 4 | 5 | 6 | 7 | 8 | 9 | 10 | Final |
|---|---|---|---|---|---|---|---|---|---|---|---|
| Jay McWilliam | 2 | 0 | 0 | 0 | 2 | 0 | 2 | 0 | 3 | X | 9 |
| John Hamilton | 0 | 0 | 0 | 1 | 0 | 1 | 0 | 2 | 0 | X | 4 |

| Team | 1 | 2 | 3 | 4 | 5 | 6 | 7 | 8 | 9 | 10 | Final |
|---|---|---|---|---|---|---|---|---|---|---|---|
| David Smith | 0 | 0 | 1 | 0 | 0 | 0 | 1 | 0 | 0 | X | 2 |
| David Edwards | 0 | 0 | 0 | 0 | 0 | 1 | 0 | 3 | 1 | X | 5 |

| Sheet 4 | 1 | 2 | 3 | 4 | 5 | 6 | 7 | 8 | 9 | 10 | Final |
|---|---|---|---|---|---|---|---|---|---|---|---|
| Tom Brewster | 2 | 0 | 1 | 1 | 0 | 1 | 1 | 0 | 0 | 3 | 9 |
| Ewan MacDonald | 0 | 0 | 0 | 0 | 1 | 0 | 0 | 2 | 2 | 0 | 5 |

| Sheet 5 | 1 | 2 | 3 | 4 | 5 | 6 | 7 | 8 | 9 | 10 | Final |
|---|---|---|---|---|---|---|---|---|---|---|---|
| David Murdoch | 0 | 1 | 1 | 0 | 0 | 0 | 0 | 2 | 0 | 3 | 7 |
| Murray Young | 1 | 0 | 0 | 1 | 0 | 0 | 1 | 0 | 2 | 0 | 5 |

=== Draw 6 ===
Thursday, February 16, 12:00 pm

| Sheet 1 | 1 | 2 | 3 | 4 | 5 | 6 | 7 | 8 | 9 | 10 | Final |
|---|---|---|---|---|---|---|---|---|---|---|---|
| David Murdoch | 0 | 1 | 0 | 0 | 1 | 0 | 2 | 0 | X | X | 4 |
| Ewan MacDonald | 3 | 0 | 1 | 0 | 0 | 2 | 0 | 2 | X | X | 8 |

| Sheet 2 | 1 | 2 | 3 | 4 | 5 | 6 | 7 | 8 | 9 | 10 | Final |
|---|---|---|---|---|---|---|---|---|---|---|---|
| Murray Young | 0 | 1 | 0 | 1 | 0 | 0 | 1 | 0 | 1 | X | 4 |
| David Edwards | 1 | 0 | 2 | 0 | 1 | 1 | 0 | 1 | 0 | X | 6 |

| Sheet 3 | 1 | 2 | 3 | 4 | 5 | 6 | 7 | 8 | 9 | 10 | Final |
|---|---|---|---|---|---|---|---|---|---|---|---|
| John Hamilton | 0 | 2 | 0 | 0 | 1 | 1 | 0 | 0 | 1 | 0 | 5 |
| Tom Brewster | 0 | 0 | 0 | 2 | 0 | 0 | 0 | 4 | 0 | 2 | 8 |

| Sheet 4 | 1 | 2 | 3 | 4 | 5 | 6 | 7 | 8 | 9 | 10 | Final |
|---|---|---|---|---|---|---|---|---|---|---|---|
| Jay McWilliam | 1 | 0 | 0 | 2 | 0 | 1 | 0 | 0 | 1 | 0 | 5 |
| Logan Gray | 0 | 1 | 1 | 0 | 1 | 0 | 0 | 3 | 0 | 1 | 7 |

| Sheet 5 | 1 | 2 | 3 | 4 | 5 | 6 | 7 | 8 | 9 | 10 | Final |
|---|---|---|---|---|---|---|---|---|---|---|---|
| David Smith | 2 | 1 | 0 | 0 | 2 | 0 | 1 | 0 | 0 | 1 | 7 |
| Graeme Black | 0 | 0 | 2 | 0 | 0 | 2 | 0 | 2 | 0 | 0 | 6 |

=== Draw 7 ===
Thursday, February 16, 8:00 pm

| Sheet 1 | 1 | 2 | 3 | 4 | 5 | 6 | 7 | 8 | 9 | 10 | Final |
|---|---|---|---|---|---|---|---|---|---|---|---|
| Tom Brewster | 0 | 1 | 0 | 0 | 0 | 3 | 2 | 0 | 7 | X | 13 |
| Murray Young | 1 | 0 | 1 | 3 | 1 | 0 | 0 | 1 | 0 | X | 7 |

| Sheet 2 | 1 | 2 | 3 | 4 | 5 | 6 | 7 | 8 | 9 | 10 | 11 | Final |
|---|---|---|---|---|---|---|---|---|---|---|---|---|
| David Murdoch | 0 | 2 | 0 | 1 | 0 | 0 | 0 | 0 | 2 | 0 | 2 | 7 |
| David Smith | 1 | 0 | 1 | 0 | 0 | 0 | 1 | 0 | 0 | 2 | 0 | 5 |

| Sheet 3 | 1 | 2 | 3 | 4 | 5 | 6 | 7 | 8 | 9 | 10 | Final |
|---|---|---|---|---|---|---|---|---|---|---|---|
| Ewan MacDonald | 1 | 0 | 1 | 1 | 0 | 0 | 1 | 0 | 0 | 0 | 4 |
| Jay McWilliam | 0 | 1 | 0 | 0 | 0 | 1 | 0 | 2 | 0 | 1 | 5 |

| Sheet 4 | 1 | 2 | 3 | 4 | 5 | 6 | 7 | 8 | 9 | 10 | Final |
|---|---|---|---|---|---|---|---|---|---|---|---|
| Graeme Black | 1 | 0 | 1 | 1 | 0 | 0 | 1 | 0 | 2 | X | 6 |
| John Hamilton | 0 | 1 | 0 | 0 | 1 | 0 | 0 | 2 | 0 | X | 4 |

| Sheet 5 | 1 | 2 | 3 | 4 | 5 | 6 | 7 | 8 | 9 | 10 | Final |
|---|---|---|---|---|---|---|---|---|---|---|---|
| David Edwards | 0 | 4 | 2 | 0 | 1 | 1 | X | X | X | X | 8 |
| Logan Gray | 0 | 0 | 0 | 2 | 0 | 0 | X | X | X | X | 2 |

=== Draw 8 ===
Friday, February 17, 8:00 am

| Sheet 1 | 1 | 2 | 3 | 4 | 5 | 6 | 7 | 8 | 9 | 10 | 11 | Final |
|---|---|---|---|---|---|---|---|---|---|---|---|---|
| John Hamilton | 0 | 2 | 0 | 0 | 0 | 2 | 0 | 0 | 0 | 2 | 0 | 6 |
| David Edwards | 1 | 0 | 1 | 2 | 0 | 0 | 0 | 1 | 1 | 0 | 3 | 9 |

| Sheet 2 | 1 | 2 | 3 | 4 | 5 | 6 | 7 | 8 | 9 | 10 | Final |
|---|---|---|---|---|---|---|---|---|---|---|---|
| Ewan MacDonald | 0 | 0 | 0 | 3 | 0 | 1 | 0 | 1 | 1 | X | 6 |
| Graeme Black | 2 | 0 | 0 | 0 | 1 | 0 | 1 | 0 | 0 | X | 4 |

| Sheet 3 | 1 | 2 | 3 | 4 | 5 | 6 | 7 | 8 | 9 | 10 | Final |
|---|---|---|---|---|---|---|---|---|---|---|---|
| David Murdoch | 0 | 0 | 1 | 1 | 0 | 0 | 2 | 0 | 2 | X | 6 |
| Logan Gray | 0 | 2 | 0 | 0 | 1 | 0 | 0 | 0 | 0 | X | 3 |

| Sheet 4 | 1 | 2 | 3 | 4 | 5 | 6 | 7 | 8 | 9 | 10 | Final |
|---|---|---|---|---|---|---|---|---|---|---|---|
| David Smith | 0 | 0 | 2 | 0 | 0 | 0 | 1 | 1 | 0 | 2 | 6 |
| Tom Brewster | 0 | 0 | 0 | 1 | 0 | 0 | 0 | 0 | 2 | 0 | 3 |

| Sheet 5 | 1 | 2 | 3 | 4 | 5 | 6 | 7 | 8 | 9 | 10 | Final |
|---|---|---|---|---|---|---|---|---|---|---|---|
| Murray Young | 0 | 2 | 0 | 0 | 2 | 0 | 1 | 0 | 2 | 0 | 7 |
| Jay McWilliam | 0 | 0 | 1 | 3 | 0 | 1 | 0 | 1 | 0 | 2 | 8 |

=== Draw 9 ===
Friday, February 17, 4:00 pm

| Sheet 1 | 1 | 2 | 3 | 4 | 5 | 6 | 7 | 8 | 9 | 10 | Final |
|---|---|---|---|---|---|---|---|---|---|---|---|
| Ewan MacDonald | 1 | 1 | 1 | 0 | 0 | 1 | 0 | 2 | 0 | X | 6 |
| Logan Gray | 0 | 0 | 0 | 0 | 1 | 0 | 1 | 0 | 2 | X | 4 |

| Sheet 2 | 1 | 2 | 3 | 4 | 5 | 6 | 7 | 8 | 9 | 10 | Final |
|---|---|---|---|---|---|---|---|---|---|---|---|
| David Edwards | 0 | 0 | 2 | 0 | 0 | 0 | 2 | 0 | 1 | 0 | 5 |
| Tom Brewster | 0 | 0 | 0 | 0 | 3 | 0 | 0 | 1 | 0 | 2 | 6 |

| Sheet 3 | 1 | 2 | 3 | 4 | 5 | 6 | 7 | 8 | 9 | 10 | Final |
|---|---|---|---|---|---|---|---|---|---|---|---|
| Graeme Black | 0 | 2 | 0 | 0 | 2 | 0 | 0 | 0 | 3 | X | 7 |
| Murray Young | 0 | 0 | 1 | 2 | 0 | 0 | 0 | 2 | 0 | X | 5 |

| Sheet 4 | 1 | 2 | 3 | 4 | 5 | 6 | 7 | 8 | 9 | 10 | 11 | Final |
|---|---|---|---|---|---|---|---|---|---|---|---|---|
| David Murdoch | 0 | 0 | 0 | 0 | 0 | 1 | 0 | 1 | 1 | 2 | 0 | 5 |
| Jay McWilliam | 0 | 0 | 0 | 0 | 2 | 0 | 3 | 0 | 0 | 0 | 1 | 6 |

| Sheet 5 | 1 | 2 | 3 | 4 | 5 | 6 | 7 | 8 | 9 | 10 | Final |
|---|---|---|---|---|---|---|---|---|---|---|---|
| John Hamilton | 0 | 2 | 0 | 1 | 0 | 0 | 0 | 0 | 0 | X | 3 |
| David Smith | 2 | 0 | 2 | 0 | 0 | 1 | 1 | 0 | 0 | X | 6 |

== Tiebreakers ==
| Round 1 | | | To Playoffs |
| | | | 1 | Jay McWilliam | 1 |
| 2 | Ewan MacDonald | 6 | | Ewan MacDonald | 7 |
| 3 | David Murdoch | 5 |

=== Round 1 ===
Friday, February 17, 8:30 pm

| Team | 1 | 2 | 3 | 4 | 5 | 6 | 7 | 8 | 9 | 10 | Final |
|---|---|---|---|---|---|---|---|---|---|---|---|
| Ewan MacDonald | 0 | 0 | 2 | 0 | 0 | 2 | 0 | 0 | 1 | 1 | 6 |
| David Murdoch | 0 | 0 | 0 | 3 | 0 | 0 | 0 | 2 | 0 | 0 | 5 |

=== Round 2 ===
Saturday, February 18, 9:00 am

| Team | 1 | 2 | 3 | 4 | 5 | 6 | 7 | 8 | 9 | 10 | Final |
|---|---|---|---|---|---|---|---|---|---|---|---|
| Jay McWilliam | 0 | 0 | 0 | 0 | 0 | 1 | X | X | X | X | 1 |
| Ewan MacDonald | 1 | 3 | 0 | 2 | 1 | 0 | X | X | X | X | 7 |

== Playoffs ==
Page playoff system
1 | David Edwards | 5
2 | David Smith | 8
3 | Tom Brewster | 6
4 | Ewan MacDonald | 5

Semifinals
1 | David Edwards | 2
3 | Tom Brewster | 6

Final
2 | David Smith | 2
3 | Tom Brewster | 5

=== 1 vs. 2 Game ===
Saturday, February 18, 2:30 pm

| Team | 1 | 2 | 3 | 4 | 5 | 6 | 7 | 8 | 9 | 10 | Final |
|---|---|---|---|---|---|---|---|---|---|---|---|
| David Edwards | 0 | 0 | 2 | 0 | 0 | 0 | 2 | 0 | 1 | 0 | 5 |
| David Smith | 0 | 0 | 0 | 1 | 1 | 0 | 0 | 4 | 0 | 2 | 8 |

=== 3 vs. 4 Game ===
Saturday, February 18, 2:30 pm

| Team | 1 | 2 | 3 | 4 | 5 | 6 | 7 | 8 | 9 | 10 | Final |
|---|---|---|---|---|---|---|---|---|---|---|---|
| Tom Brewster | 1 | 0 | 3 | 0 | 0 | 0 | 0 | 1 | 0 | 1 | 6 |
| Ewan MacDonald | 0 | 1 | 0 | 2 | 1 | 0 | 1 | 0 | 0 | 0 | 5 |

=== Semifinal ===
Saturday, February 18, 7:40 pm

| Team | 1 | 2 | 3 | 4 | 5 | 6 | 7 | 8 | 9 | 10 | Final |
|---|---|---|---|---|---|---|---|---|---|---|---|
| David Edwards | 0 | 0 | 0 | 0 | 1 | 0 | 0 | 1 | 0 | X | 2 |
| Tom Brewster | 0 | 0 | 1 | 1 | 0 | 0 | 1 | 0 | 3 | X | 6 |

=== Final ===
Sunday, February 19, 3:10 pm

| Team | 1 | 2 | 3 | 4 | 5 | 6 | 7 | 8 | 9 | 10 | Final |
|---|---|---|---|---|---|---|---|---|---|---|---|
| David Smith | 0 | 0 | 0 | 0 | 0 | 0 | 2 | 0 | 0 | 0 | 2 |
| Tom Brewster | 0 | 0 | 2 | 0 | 0 | 0 | 0 | 2 | 0 | 1 | 5 |
