= 2012 Scottish Women's Curling Championship =

2012 Co-operative Funeralcare Scottish Women's Curling Championship
- Host city: Perth, Scotland
- Arena: Dewars Centre
- Dates: February 13–19
- Winner: Eve Muirhead
- Curling club: Dunkeld CC, Dunkeld
- Skip: Eve Muirhead
- Third: Anna Sloan
- Second: Vicki Adams
- Lead: Claire Hamilton
- Finalist: Gail Munro

The 2012 Co-operative Funeralcare Scottish Women's Curling Championship was held from February 13 to 19 at the Dewars Centre in Perth, Scotland. It was held in conjunction with the 2012 Scottish Men's Curling Championship. The winner of the championship, Eve Muirhead, represented Scotland at the 2012 Ford World Women's Curling Championship in Lethbridge, Alberta, Canada.

== Teams ==
The teams are as follows:

Skip	Third	Second	Lead	Locale
Jennifer Martin	Tasha Aitken	Fiona Telfer	Mhairi Anderson	Kilmarnock
Eve Muirhead	Anna Sloan	Vicki Adams	Clare Hamilton	Perth
Jennifer Dodds	Rebecca Kesley	Mhairi Baird	Vicky Wright	Murrayfield
Jackie Lockhart	Karen Kennedy	Kay Adams	Sarah Macintyre	Aberdeen
Sarah Reid	Lorna Vevers	Rachael Sim	Barbara McFarlane	Kilmarnock
Hannah Fleming	Lauren Gray	Alice Spence	Abi Brown	Lockerbie
Gail Munro	Lyndsay Cumming	Katie Wright	Jodie Milroy	Stranraer
Gina Aitken	Katy Richardson	Rowena Kerr	Rachel Hannen	Murrayfield
Kerry Barr	Helen King	Rhiann McLeod	Caitlin Barr	Murrayfield

== Round robin standings ==
Final Round Robin Standings

Key
Teams to Playoffs

Skip	W	L
Hannah Fleming	7	1
Eve Muirhead	6	2
Gail Munro	6	2
Jackie Lockhart	6	2
Sarah Reid	5	3
Jennifer Dodds	3	5
Jennifer Martin	2	6
Kerry Barr	1	7
Gina Aitken	1	7

== Round robin results ==
All times listed in Western European Time (UTC+0).

=== Draw 1 ===
Monday, February 13, 1:00 pm

Sheet 2	1	2	3	4	5	6	7	8	9	10	11	Final
Gail Munro	3	0	0	1	0	2	0	2	0	0	1	9
Kerry Barr 🔨	0	1	1	0	1	0	1	0	2	2	0	8

Sheet 3	1	2	3	4	5	6	7	8	9	10	Final
Hannah Fleming 🔨	1	1	1	0	0	2	1	2	X	X	8
Jennifer Dodds	0	0	0	0	2	0	0	0	X	X	2

Sheet 4	1	2	3	4	5	6	7	8	9	10	Final
Jennifer Martin	2	0	1	0	0	1	0	2	0	X	6
Eve Muirhead 🔨	0	1	0	2	3	0	4	0	1	X	11

Sheet 5	1	2	3	4	5	6	7	8	9	10	Final
Jackie Lockhart	0	0	2	0	2	0	1	0	0	2	7
Sarah Reid 🔨	0	1	0	0	0	1	0	3	0	0	5

=== Draw 2 ===
Monday, February 13, 8:45 pm

Sheet 2	1	2	3	4	5	6	7	8	9	10	Final
Gina Aitken	0	0	1	0	0	0	1	0	X	X	2
Sarah Reid 🔨	1	1	0	0	5	0	0	2	X	X	9

Sheet 3	1	2	3	4	5	6	7	8	9	10	Final
Jennifer Martin	0	0	0	0	1	0	X	X	X	X	1
Jackie Lockhart 🔨	1	1	3	1	0	2	X	X	X	X	8

Sheet 4	1	2	3	4	5	6	7	8	9	10	Final
Kerry Barr 🔨	0	0	1	0	1	0	0	X	X	X	2
Jennifer Dodds	0	1	0	2	0	3	2	X	X	X	8

Sheet 5	1	2	3	4	5	6	7	8	9	10	Final
Hannah Fleming	0	1	2	0	0	0	1	0	0	0	4
Eve Muirhead 🔨	0	0	0	1	2	1	0	1	0	2	7

=== Draw 3 ===
Tuesday, February 14, 12:00 pm

Sheet 2	1	2	3	4	5	6	7	8	9	10	Final
Kerry Barr	0	0	1	0	1	1	0	0	X	X	3
Eve Muirhead 🔨	0	1	0	1	0	0	3	4	X	X	9

Sheet 3	1	2	3	4	5	6	7	8	9	10	Final
Jennifer Dodds	1	0	0	1	0	0	1	0	0	X	3
Sarah Reid 🔨	0	2	0	0	0	3	0	2	0	X	7

Sheet 4	1	2	3	4	5	6	7	8	9	10	Final
Gail Munro 🔨	1	0	2	0	0	1	0	2	0	1	7
Jackie Lockhart	0	1	0	0	1	0	3	0	1	0	6

Sheet 5	1	2	3	4	5	6	7	8	9	10	Final
Jennifer Martin 🔨	1	0	2	0	0	1	0	2	0	3	9
Gina Aitken	0	2	0	1	1	0	1	0	2	0	7

=== Draw 4 ===
Tuesday, February 14, 8:00 pm

Sheet 2	1	2	3	4	5	6	7	8	9	10	Final
Hannah Fleming 🔨	0	1	0	0	4	0	0	2	0	X	7
Jackie Lockhart	0	0	1	0	0	1	1	0	1	X	4

Sheet 3	1	2	3	4	5	6	7	8	9	10	Final
Gail Munro 🔨	2	0	0	1	0	1	0	2	0	1	7
Jennifer Martin	0	1	1	0	2	0	1	0	1	0	6

Sheet 4	1	2	3	4	5	6	7	8	9	10	Final
Jennifer Dodds	0	1	1	0	0	1	2	0	1	X	6
Gina Aitken 🔨	0	0	0	0	2	0	0	1	0	X	3

Sheet 5	1	2	3	4	5	6	7	8	9	10	Final
Kerry Barr 🔨	0	0	0	1	0	2	1	0	0	1	5
Sarah Reid	0	0	0	0	2	0	0	2	0	0	4

=== Draw 5 ===
Wednesday, February 15, 8:00 am

Sheet 2	1	2	3	4	5	6	7	8	9	10	Final
Jennifer Dodds	0	0	0	0	1	1	0	0	0	X	2
Gail Munro 🔨	2	0	0	0	0	0	1	0	2	X	5

Sheet 3	1	2	3	4	5	6	7	8	9	10	11	Final
Kerry Barr 🔨	0	0	1	1	0	0	0	0	0	1	0	3
Gina Aitken	0	1	0	0	2	0	0	0	0	0	1	4

Sheet 4	1	2	3	4	5	6	7	8	9	10	Final
Hannah Fleming	0	1	0	0	2	0	0	2	0	2	7
Jennifer Martin 🔨	1	0	1	1	0	0	1	0	2	0	6

Sheet 5	1	2	3	4	5	6	7	8	9	10	11	Final
Eve Muirhead 🔨	0	2	0	1	0	0	0	0	0	1	0	4
Jackie Lockhart	1	0	2	0	1	0	0	0	0	0	1	5

=== Draw 6 ===
Wednesday, February 15, 4:00 pm

Sheet 2	1	2	3	4	5	6	7	8	9	10	Final
Sarah Reid 🔨	1	0	3	0	1	0	1	0	2	X	8
Jennifer Martin	0	1	0	2	0	1	0	2	0	X	6

Sheet 3	1	2	3	4	5	6	7	8	9	10	Final
Jackie Lockhart	0	0	0	2	0	0	1	0	0	2	5
Jennifer Dodds 🔨	0	1	2	0	0	0	0	0	1	0	4

Sheet 4	1	2	3	4	5	6	7	8	9	10	Final
Eve Muirhead 🔨	0	1	0	2	0	1	1	0	1	0	6
Gina Aitken	1	0	1	0	1	0	0	1	0	1	5

Sheet 5	1	2	3	4	5	6	7	8	9	10	11	Final
Gail Munro 🔨	1	0	2	0	1	2	0	1	0	0	0	7
Hannah Fleming	0	1	0	3	0	0	1	0	0	2	1	8

=== Draw 7 ===
Thursday, February 16, 9:00 am

Sheet 2	1	2	3	4	5	6	7	8	9	10	Final
Jackie Lockhart 🔨	0	0	3	1	0	3	2	X	X	X	9
Gina Aitken	0	0	0	0	1	0	0	X	X	X	1

Sheet 3	1	2	3	4	5	6	7	8	9	10	Final
Eve Muirhead 🔨	2	0	5	0	1	0	0	3	X	X	11
Gail Munro	0	1	0	1	0	2	0	0	X	X	4

Sheet 4	1	2	3	4	5	6	7	8	9	10	Final
Sarah Reid	0	0	0	1	0	0	1	0	2	1	5
Hannah Fleming 🔨	0	0	1	0	2	0	0	1	0	0	4

Sheet 5	1	2	3	4	5	6	7	8	9	10	Final
Jennifer Martin 🔨	1	0	1	0	0	2	0	2	0	2	8
Kerry Barr	0	0	0	2	0	0	1	0	1	0	4

=== Draw 8 ===
Thursday, February 16, 4:00 pm

Sheet 2	1	2	3	4	5	6	7	8	9	10	Final
Eve Muirhead 🔨	2	0	0	2	1	0	0	0	5	X	10
Jennifer Dodds	0	2	0	0	0	0	0	2	0	X	4

Sheet 3	1	2	3	4	5	6	7	8	9	10	Final
Gina Aitken 🔨	1	0	0	1	1	1	0	1	0	X	5
Hannah Fleming	0	4	2	0	0	0	1	0	1	X	8

Sheet 4	1	2	3	4	5	6	7	8	9	10	Final
Jackie Lockhart	0	0	1	0	4	0	0	1	0	1	7
Kerry Barr 🔨	1	0	0	1	0	1	1	0	1	0	5

Sheet 5	1	2	3	4	5	6	7	8	9	10	11	Final
Sarah Reid	0	0	2	1	1	0	0	2	0	3	0	9
Gail Munro 🔨	0	2	0	0	0	2	2	0	3	0	3	12

=== Draw 9 ===
Friday, February 17, 12:00 pm

Sheet 2	1	2	3	4	5	6	7	8	9	10	Final
Kerry Barr 🔨	0	1	0	2	0	2	1	0	0	0	6
Hannah Fleming	0	0	1	0	2	0	0	1	1	2	7

Sheet 3	1	2	3	4	5	6	7	8	9	10	Final
Sarah Reid 🔨	0	3	0	2	0	0	1	1	0	X	7
Eve Muirhead	0	0	1	0	1	1	0	0	2	X	5

Sheet 4	1	2	3	4	5	6	7	8	9	10	11	Final
Gina Aitken	0	0	0	1	0	2	1	0	2	1	0	7
Gail Munro 🔨	2	1	1	0	2	0	0	1	0	0	1	8

Sheet 5	1	2	3	4	5	6	7	8	9	10	Final
Jennifer Dodds	1	1	2	0	0	3	0	2	X	X	9
Jennifer Martin 🔨	0	0	0	1	1	0	1	0	X	X	3

== Playoffs ==
Semifinals
Gail Munro	9
Hannah Fleming	2
Eve Muirhead	8
Jackie Lockhart	4

Final
Eve Muirhead	9
Gail Munro	3

=== Semifinals ===
Saturday, February 18, 7:30 pm

Team	1	2	3	4	5	6	7	8	9	10	Final
Gail Munro	0	0	1	1	2	3	2	0	X	X	9
Hannah Fleming 🔨	1	0	0	0	0	0	0	1	X	X	2

Team	1	2	3	4	5	6	7	8	9	10	Final
Eve Muirhead 🔨	4	0	0	1	0	2	0	0	1	X	8
Jackie Lockhart	0	0	1	0	3	0	0	1	0	X	5

=== Final ===
Sunday, February 19, 11:00 am

Team	1	2	3	4	5	6	7	8	9	10	Final
Gail Munro	0	1	0	0	0	1	0	1	X	X	3
Eve Muirhead 🔨	1	0	2	2	0	0	4	0	X	X	9
