= Eve Muirhead =

Scottish curler (born 1990)

Eve Muirhead OBE
- Curler
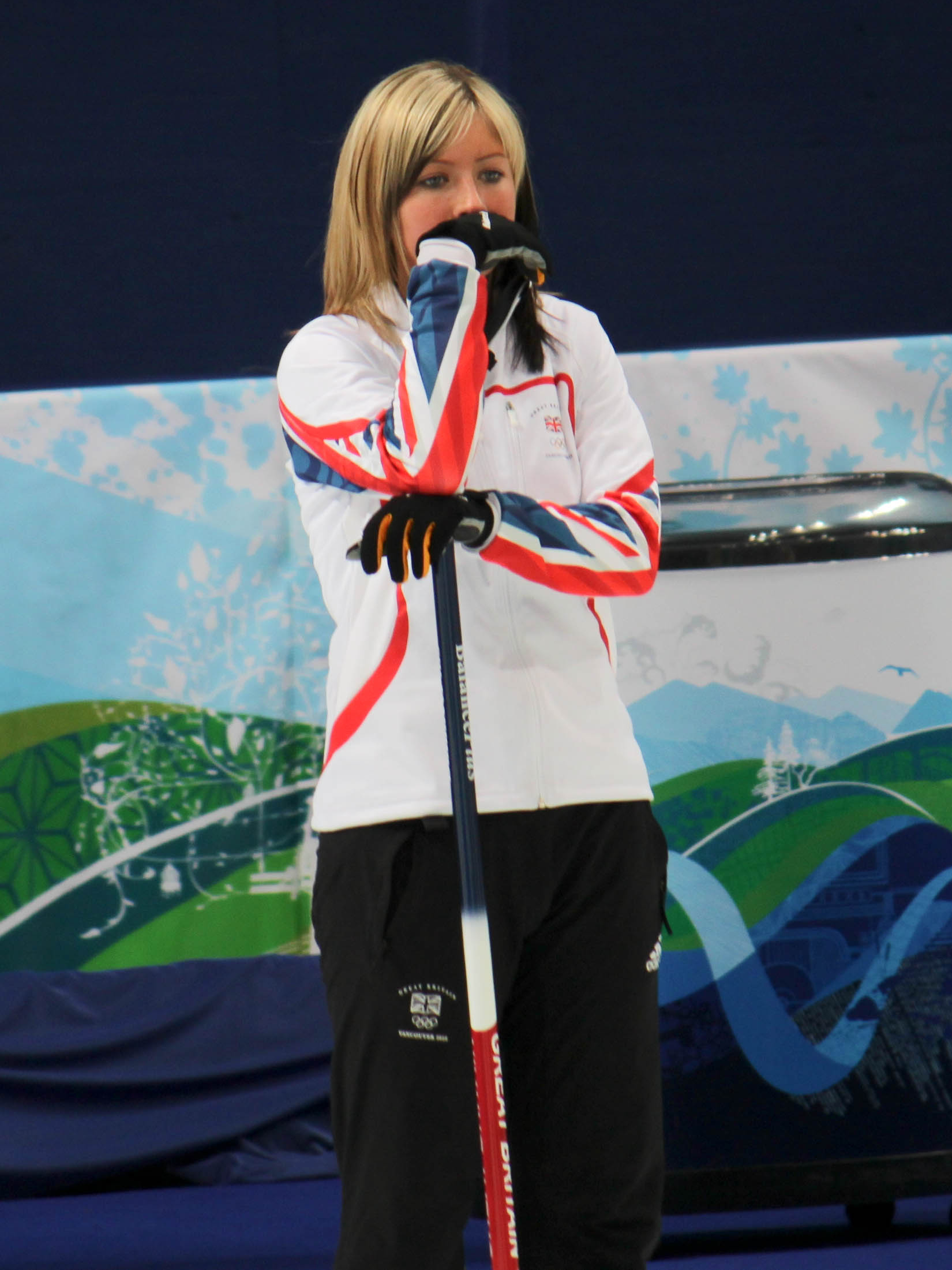
- Eve Muirhead at the 2010 Winter Olympics in Vancouver
- Born: 22 April 1990 (age 36); Perth, Scotland
- Height: 173 cm (5 ft 8 in)

Team
- Curling club: Dunkeld CC, Pitlochry, SCO
- Mixed doubles partner: Bobby Lammie

Curling career
- Member Association: Scotland; Great Britain
- World Championship: 9 (2009, 2010, 2011, 2012, 2013, 2015, 2016, 2017, 2021)
- World Mixed Doubles Championship: 1 (2022)
- European Championship: 13 (2008, 2009, 2010, 2011, 2012, 2013, 2014, 2015, 2016, 2017, 2018, 2019, 2021)
- Olympic: 4 (2010, 2014, 2018, 2022)
- Grand Slam victories: 6 (2013 Players', 2013 Autumn Gold, 2014 Colonial Square, 2014 Canadian Open, 2015 Players', 2016 Players')
Medal record
Event	1st	2nd	3rd
Olympic Games	1	0	1
World Championships	1	1	1
World Mixed Doubles Championships	1	0	0
European Championships	3	5	2
European Mixed Team Championships	1	0	0
World Junior.Championships	4	0	0
Total	11	6	4
Women's curling
Representing Great Britain
Olympic Games
Gold medal – first place	2022 Beijing	Team
Bronze medal – third place	2014 Sochi	Team
Representing Scotland
World Championships
Gold medal – first place	2013 Riga	
Silver medal – second place	2010 Swift Current	
Bronze medal – third place	2017 Beijing	
World Mixed Doubles Championships
Gold medal – first place	2022 Geneva	
European Championships
Gold medal – first place	2011 Moscow	
Gold medal – first place	2017 St Gallen	
Gold medal – first place	2021 Lillehammer	
Silver medal – second place	2010 Champéry	
Silver medal – second place	2012 Karlstad	
Silver medal – second place	2013 Stavanger	
Silver medal – second place	2015 Esbjerg	
Silver medal – second place	2019 Helsingborg	
Bronze medal – third place	2014 Champéry	
Bronze medal – third place	2016 Braehead	
Scottish Women's Championships
Gold medal – first place	2009 Perth	
Gold medal – first place	2010 Perth	
Gold medal – first place	2012 Perth	
Gold medal – first place	2013 Perth	
Gold medal – first place	2015 Perth	
Gold medal – first place	2016 Perth	
Gold medal – first place	2017 Perth	
Gold medal – first place	2020 Perth	
Silver medal – second place	2019 Perth	
World Junior Championships
Gold medal – first place	2007 Eveleth	
Gold medal – first place	2008 Ostersund	
Gold medal – first place	2009 Vancouver	
Gold medal – first place	2011 Perth	
Scottish Mixed Doubles Championships
Gold medal – first place	2022 Perth	
Bronze medal – third place	2020 Perth	
European Mixed Championships
Gold medal – first place	2012 Erzurum	

Eve Muirhead (born 22 April 1990) is a Scottish curler from Perth and a former skip of the British Olympic curling team. Muirhead's rink became Olympic champions at the 2022 Winter Olympics in Beijing, having previously won the bronze medal at the 2014 Winter Olympics in Sochi. She is a former world champion, three-time European champion, and eight-time Scottish women's champion.

As skip of the Scotland team, Muirhead won the 2011 European Championships, the 2013 World Championships, the 2017 European Championships, and the 2021 European Championships. She is also a four-time World Junior Champion (2007, 2008, 2009 and 2011). A four-time Olympian, she represented Great Britain at the Winter Olympics in Vancouver 2010, Sochi 2014, Pyeongchang 2018, and Beijing 2022. In Sochi, she became the youngest-ever skip, male or female, to win an Olympic medal. Muirhead announced her retirement as a curler on 11 August 2022, but in 2026, she announced her intention to return to the sport and compete in the mixed doubles with Bobby Lammie; the pair were previously World Mixed Doubles champions in 2022.

Muirhead is from a family of curlers; her father Gordon is a former three-time World Championship silver medallist, and both her brothers have competed internationally. She is also an accomplished bagpipes player and has competed in the World Pipe Band Championships on four occasions. During her retirement, she worked as a coach, was appointed Chef de Mission for Team GB at the 2026 Winter Olympics, and wrote an autobiography.

== Career ==
=== Early life and junior career ===
Eve Muirhead was born in Perth, Scotland, on 22 April 1990. Her father was former world curling champion Gordon Muirhead, and she grew up on a farm near Blair Atholl with her brothers Glen and Thomas who also became curlers. She attended Blair Atholl Primary School, Pitlochry High School and Morrison's Academy. During her childhood, she watched her father play the sport and she credits curler Rhona Martin's victory at the 2002 Winter Olympics as a major inspiration. Muirhead began curling aged nine at Dunkeld Curling Club. She was also a skilled golfer, and played for the regional team in Perth and Kinross. She won the Highland Open, and advanced to the final 16 of the British Girls' Championship. Muirhead was offered scholarships to play golf in the United States, but chose to concentrate on curling as she believed the sport offered her the best opportunity to reach the elite level.

Muirhead competed for Scotland at the 2007 World Junior Curling Championships in Eveleth, Minnesota, The team was skipped by Sarah Reid, and they won the gold medal with a 7–6 victory over Canada in the final. She skipped her own team to victory at the 2008 Scottish Junior Women's Championship, and won further titles in the competition in both 2009 and 2011. Muirhead was skip for the Scotland team at the 2008 World Junior Curling Championships in Östersund, beating Sweden (skipped by Cecilia Östlund) 12–3 in the final.

Muirhead returned to the 2009 World Junior Curling Championships in Vancouver to play at the Vancouver Olympic Centre, the future site of the 2010 Winter Olympics. She faced the hometown Canadian team led by Kaitlyn Lawes in the final and defeated them 8–6 to secure her third World Junior Championship in a row. In December 2009, she was awarded the BBC Scotland Young Sports Personality of the Year award for her achievements in curling. Muirhead competed at the 2011 World Junior Curling Championships in her native Scotland, and won the gold medal for an unprecedented fourth time in her career. She beat Canada's Trish Paulsen 10–3 in the final.

=== Senior career 2009–2014: World and European champion ===
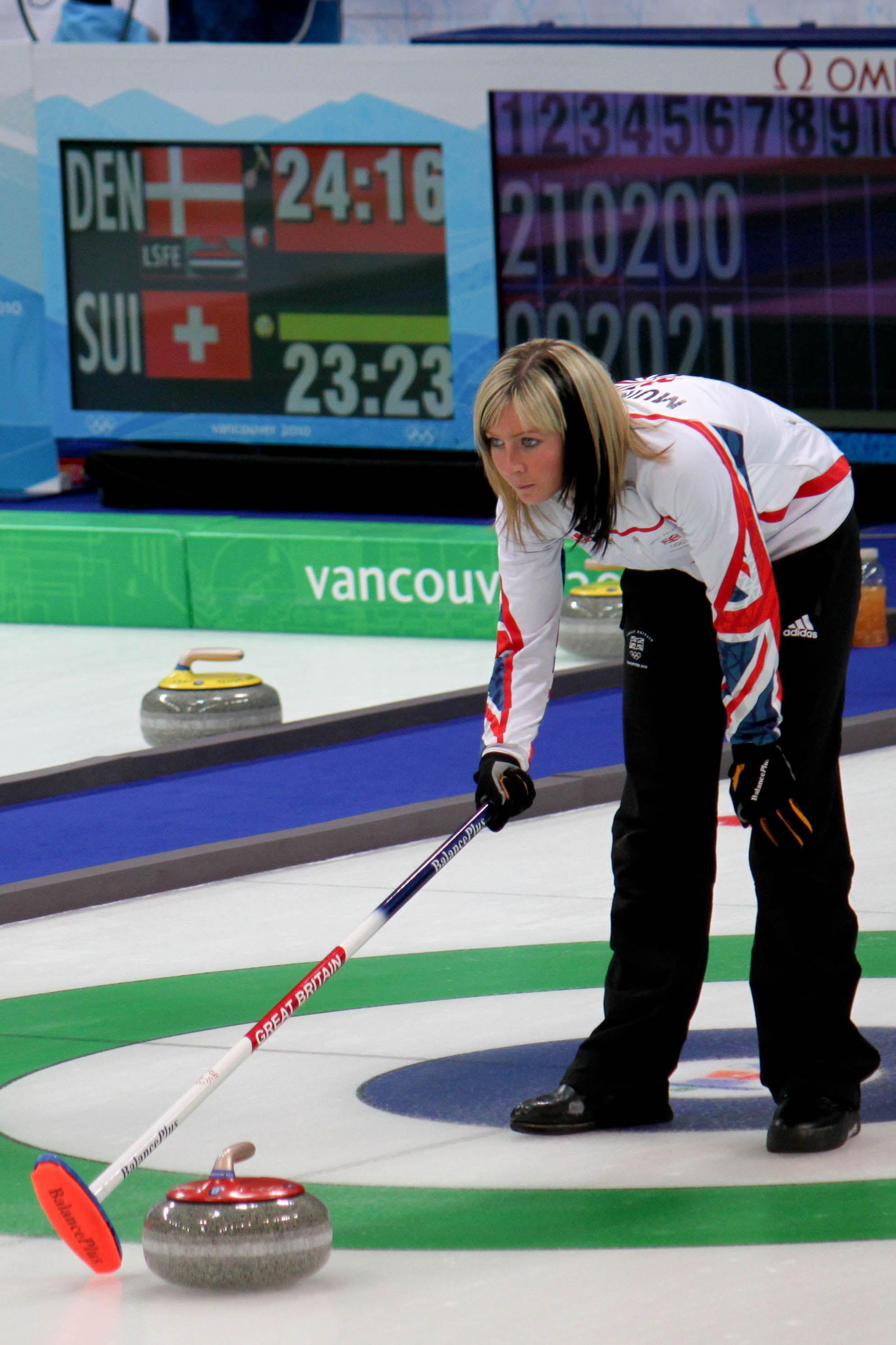
Muirhead skippering the British team at the 2010 Winter Olympics

Muirhead represented Scotland at the 2009 World Women's Curling Championship in Gangneung, South Korea. They finished the round-robin phase with five wins and six defeats and were eliminated from the competition, but their performance earned Great Britain a place at the following year's Olympics. Later that year, she won the Three Nations Cup for Great Britain, and finished sixth with Scotland at the 2009 European Curling Championships in Aberdeen, Scotland. Muirhead was skip for the Great Britain women's curling team at the 2010 Winter Olympics in Vancouver. At the age of 19, she was the youngest skip in Olympic curling history. They began the event by defeating reigning world champions China 5–4 in their opening tie, but after winning only three of their nine round-robin matches, a 5–6 loss to Canada ended their competition, and the team failed to qualify for the semi-finals. Following the conclusion of an earlier group match versus Denmark, in which she missed a potential match winning shot with her final stone, Muirhead broke her broom on the ice in frustration.

A few days after returning from the 2010 Winter Olympics, Muirhead successfully defended her Scottish Women's Curling Championship title by defeating Gail Munro 8–7 in Perth, Scotland. The victory secured her rinks' place at the 2010 World Women's Curling Championship. There, she finished with the silver medal, after Scotland lost 8–6 to Germany in the final, which went to an extra end. En route to the final, her team finished the round-robin matches in third place with an 8–3 record, then advanced to the semi-finals by winning the 3 vs. 4-page playoff against Sweden, before winning their semi-final 10–4 against Canada's rink skipped by Jennifer Jones. She also won a silver medal at the 2010 European Curling Championships in Champéry, Switzerland, following a 6–8 loss in the final to Sweden's rink led by Stina Viktorsson.

Muirhead was named as Scotland's alternate at the 2011 World Women's Curling Championship; the team finished ninth. On 1 November 2011, she won a place at the forthcoming European Championships, after successfully advancing through qualifying. At the 2011 European Curling Championships in Moscow, Muirhead led Scotland to their first gold in the event since 1975. They advanced to the final following a 10–2 semi-final victory over Denmark. In the gold medal match against Sweden, the team of Muirhead, Anna Sloan, Vicki Adams, Claire Hamilton and Kay Adams took a 7–0 lead after five ends against a team who had started the match unbeaten in the competition. Muirhead's rink completed an 8–2 victory. Muirhead was named to represent Team World in the 2012 Continental Cup, and they defeated Team North America to win the event.

Muirhead won her third Scottish Championship title in 2012 after beating Jackie Lockhart 8–4 in the semi-finals and Munro 9–3 in the final. At the 2012 World Women's Curling Championship in Alberta, Canada, her rink ended with a 6–5 record to place sixth overall. Muirhead attended the 2012 Summer Olympics in London as a spectator, and said the experience helped change her approach to curling. She stated that she began taking fitness and conditioning much more seriously to try and gain an edge on her rivals. Later that year, she won gold at the 2012 European Mixed Curling Championship in Erzurum, Turkey. Skipped by Ewan MacDonald, the team beat Sweden 8–4 in the final. Muirhead's Scotland team won the silver medal at the 2012 European Curling Championships in Karlstad, Sweden. After overcoming Sweden in the semi-finals, her rink were beaten in the final 5–6 by Russia in an extra end. At the 2013 Continental Cup, she was a member of Team World who were defeated by Team North America.

Muirhead won the Scottish Championship for a fourth time in 2013 by beating Team Fleming 8–4 in the final. The team of Muirhead, Sloan, Adams, Hamilton and Lauren Gray played at the 2013 World Women's Curling Championship in Riga, Latvia, winning 10 out of 11 matches in the round-robin phase, before defeating Canada 8–7 in the semi-finals and Sweden's Margaretha Sigfridsson 6–5 in the final. The win made Muirhead the youngest skip ever to win the World Women's Curling Championship, and she secured victory with her final stone of the contest. In July that year, Muirhead said she was "gutted" with the decision by the Royal Caledonian Curling Club (RCCC) to block Scotland's entrants at next year's Winter Olympics from competing at the 2014 World Women's Curling Championship; this denied her rink the chance to defend their world title. Former president of the club Robbie Scott called the decision "an absolute disgrace", but the RCCC responded to the situation by stating that they wanted the team to have sole focus on the Olympics. Muirhead and her rink won their first-ever Grand Slam event by winning the 2013 Players' Championship. It marked the first time a European team had won an event in the series. Muirhead faced Sigfridsson's rink in the final, in a re-match of the 2013 World Championship.

Muirhead won the 2013 Curlers Corner Autumn Gold Curling Classic by overcoming China's Bingyu Wang 8–3 in the final, but a few weeks later, her rink were defeated 5–7 by Rachel Homan in the final of the 2013 Masters. In the 2013 European Curling Championships in Stavanger, Norway, Muirhead's rink won all of their round-robin games, before progressing past Switzerland to reach the final. They suffered a 5–10 loss to Sweden to finish with silver. At the 2014 Continetal Cup, Muirhead was unable to stop Team World losing to Team North America.

Muirhead skipped for Great Britain at the 2014 Winter Olympics in Sochi, Russia. Her team qualified for the semi-finals, finishing the round-robin phase in fourth position after winning five of their nine matches. In the semi-finals, Great Britain fell 0–3 behind against Canada after the first two ends, and were unable to recover the deficit, eventually losing 4–6 to Jennifer Jones side. Great Britain (Muirhead, Sloan, Adams and Hamilton) won the bronze medal by beating Switzerland 6–5 in the bronze medal play-off. The match was level after nine ends with Muirhead making the winning shot with the final stone. It was the first Olympic medal in curling for Great Britain's women since 2002, when Rhona Martin, now the team coach, led her rink to victory. Muirhead became the youngest ever skip to win an Olympic medal. She won bronze at the 2014 European Curling Championships in Champery following an 8–4 victory over Denmark. The Danish rink had twice defeated Scotland earlier in the competition. Muirhead won further events at the 2014 Colonial Square Ladies Classic, and the inaugural Women's 2014 Canadian Open of Curling.

=== 2015–2022: Olympic champion ===
Muirhead was beaten with Team Europe by Team Canada in the 2015 Continental Cup, before claiming victory at the 2015 Scottish Championship by beating Hannah Fleming 6–5. She claimed her second Grand Slam title of the season by winning the 2015 Players' Championship. At the 2015 World Women's Curling Championship, she finished in fourth place, after suffering a 4–13 defeat to Russia in the bronze medal match. At the 2015 European Curling Championships in Esbjerg, Denmark, Muirhead's Scotland team fought back from 0–5 behind to overcome Finland 9–7 and advance to the gold medal match. They were defeated 4–6 by Russia in the final to claim silver. She represented Team World in the 2016 Continental Cup, but they were defeated by Team North America, and she won her sixth Scottish title at the 2016 Championships by beating Gray 8–4 to qualify her rink for the forthcoming World Championships. At the 2016 World Women's Curling Championship in Saskatchewan, Canada, her team missed the playoffs with seven wins and four defeats in the round-robin phase to finish in fifth place. She won the 2016 Players' Championship, after defeating Jones 9–6 in the final—her third career victory in the competition.

Muirhead's Scotland rink won bronze at the 2016 European Curling Championships in Braehead, Scotland. They won all nine round-robin games before losing to Russia in the semi-finals. They then beat the Czech Republic 6–2 in the bronze medal contest. She beat Fleming 6–4 at the Scottish Championship to win the title for a third straight year, and at the 2017 World Women's Curling Championship in Beijing, Muirhead claimed the bronze medal. Scotland finished fourth in the round-robin stage and overcame Sweden 6–4 to secure third place, having lost to the Swedish rink earlier in the competition. At the 2017 European Curling Championships in St Gallen, Switzerland, Muirhead led the Scotland team featuring Sloan, Grey and Adams to a 6–3 success against Sweden to become European champions. Scotland had won seven of their nine round-robin matches, and qualified for the final following a 7–5 victory over Switzerland in the semi-finals.

Muirhead was skip for the British team at the 2018 Winter Olympics in PyeongChang, South Korea. She led her team to a 6–3 round-robin record, finishing with a victory against Canada, to qualify Great Britain for a semi-finals match against Sweden's Anna Hasselborg rink. Great Britain were defeated 10–5, leaving them in the bronze medal game against Japan's Satsuki Fujisawa team. Trailing 3–4 in the final end with one stone remaining, Muirhead missed a chance to win two shots, and Great Britain lost 3–5 to finish in fourth place. That summer, her teammate Sloan announced that she was taking a career break; Muirhead called it "the end of an era" for her team. Jen Dodds and Vicky Wright joined Team Muirhead as replacements.

In 2018, Muirhead underwent hip surgery. She said that she had been in significant pain for three to four years, had been diagnosed with arthritis, and feared for her career. Muirhead scored the winning points as Team World won the 2019 Continental Cup against Team North America—Team World's first victory in the event for seven years. In an article she wrote for the Scottish newspaper The Courier in May 2019, she stated that a recent win in the Arctic Cup had reinstated her belief that she could still compete at the elite level having suffered from self doubts since her injury. Her teammate Adams (Chalmers) retired from curling that same month, and in November, Muirhead stated that she was still finding it difficult to control pain in her hip following the surgery that she had undergone the previous year. Scotland won silver in the 2019 European Curling Championships in Helsingborg, Sweden. They advanced past Switzerland in the semi-finals, before losing to Sweden 4–5 in the final. Muirhead's team held a one-point lead entering the final end, but Swedish skip Hasselborg secured the winning points with the last stone of the contest. She represented Team Europe in the 2020 Continental Cup, and helped them to victory over Team Canada.

Muirhead did not appear at the World Championships again until 2021, after missing 2018 due to losing a playoff against that year's Scottish champion Fleming, losing the 2019 Scottish final to Sophie Jackson, and because the 2020 World Women's Curling Championship was cancelled due to the COVID-19 pandemic. She won the 2020 Scottish Championships by beating Maggie Wilson 8–3 in the final. At the 2021 World Women's Curling Championship in Calgary, Canada, which was played in front of no spectators due to the ongoing pandemic, Muirhead led Scotland to a 6–7 record for an eighth-place finish. She was skip of the Scotland team that won gold at the 2021 European Curling Championships in Lillehammer, Norway. The team of Muirhead, Dodds, Wright and Hailey Duff, defeated defending champions Sweden in the gold medal match. Her team reached the final with a victory over Germany in the semi-finals having advanced to that stage with eight wins from nine round-robin games. Her win in her eighth career European Championships final earned her a third title in the competition. She has since stated that around this period she was suffering from depression.

Muirhead was named as skip for the women's curling team at the 2022 Winter Olympics in Beijing, China, after advancing through an Olympic qualifying event held in the Netherlands. She was also named as flagbearer for Team GB at the opening ceremony alongside skier Dave Ryding. Great Britain qualified from their group with five wins and four defeats, before defeating Sweden 12–11 in the semi-finals, in a match that went to an extra end. She then led her team (Duff in lead, Dodds in second and Wright in third) to a 10–3 win over Japan, winning her first ever Olympic gold medal, and Team GB's only gold medal of the Games. Great Britain led Japan 4–1 after five ends, and scored four shots in the seventh to build a large lead. The Japanese team conceded the match after the ninth end, in which Muirhead won two more shots, to finish the match one end early.

Also that year, she partnered fellow Scot Bobby Lammie to win both the Scottish Mixed Doubles Curling Championship, and the Mixed Doubles World Championship. In the latter, the duo won eleven consecutive matches during the event, which included a semi-finals win over Germany, and a 9–7 success against the Swiss pairing in the final. Muirhead's rink were not selected to compete at the 2022 World Women's Curling Championship, with Rebecca Morrison, winner of the 2022 Scottish Women's Championship named instead. On 11 August 2022, Muirhead announced her retirement from the sport.

=== Retirement ===
In 2023, Muirhead took up a part-time coaching role with Fay Henderson's team, which includes Amy McDonald, Katie McMillan and Hailey Duff. Muirhead was appointed Chef de Mission for Team GB at the 2024 Winter Youth Olympics. With her guidance, Great Britain won the gold medal in both the mixed doubles and mixed team curling events. She was appointed in the same role for the senior team at the 2026 Winter Olympics.

While retired, she served as the general manager of Team Alpine, who compete in curling's Rock League. She also competed in Hyrox events, and was given training advice by retired athlete Steve Cram during her preparations for the 2023 London Marathon. On 18 September 2025, her autobiography Ice Queen was published.

=== Comeback ===
On 6 August 2026, Muirhead announced she was coming out of retirement to compete alongside Bobby Lammie in mixed doubles curling with the goal of making the 2030 Winter Olympics. In October 2026, she made her return to competition at the Scottish Curling Mixed Doubles Championship, where the pair failed to advance past the group stage.

== Personal life ==
Muirhead is a keen golfer, and competed in the 2014 BMW PGA Championship pro-am. She is also an accomplished bagpiper, piping at four World Championships, since taking up the pursuit aged ten. In April 2010, Muirhead modelled at the fashion show Dressed to Kilt, and the following month, it was announced that she would be the new ambassador for Piping Live! 2010, a festival dedicated to playing the bagpipes. There is a portrait of her by Brad Askew with broom, clubs and pipes at the National Galleries Scotland. In 2015, Muirhead was diagnosed with coeliac disease. She opened The National Curling Academy in Stirling in 2017.

In 2018, Muirhead received an honorary degree from the University of Stirling. She was appointed Member of the Order of the British Empire (MBE) in the 2020 Birthday Honours for services to curling and Officer of the Order of the British Empire (OBE) in the 2022 Birthday Honours, also for services to curling.

Muirhead's father, Gordon Muirhead, was also an international curler. He competed in the 1992 Winter Olympics, where curling was a demonstration sport, and was alternate for Scotland's 1999 gold medal-winning World Championship team. He won world silver medals in 1992, 1993 and 1995. Her brothers Glen and Thomas represented Team GB at curling in the 2018 Winter Olympics.

Muirhead is a supporter of Scottish Premier League football club St Johnstone, who were her local team growing up in Perth. After winning bronze at the 2014 Winter Olympics, she and team-mate Vicki Adams were invited on to the pitch prior to a St Johnstone match against Hibernian.

== Teams ==
Season	Skip	Third	Second	Lead
2006–07	Sarah Reid	Eve Muirhead	Barbara McFarlane	Sarah MacIntyre
2007–08	Eve Muirhead	Kerry Barr	Vicki Adams	Sarah MacIntyre
2008–09	Eve Muirhead	Anna Sloan (Jr); Karen Addison (W)	Vicki Adams (Jr); Rachael Simms (W)	Sarah MacIntyre (Jr); Anne Laird (W)
2009–10	Eve Muirhead	Jackie Lockhart (E/O); Kelly Wood (W)	Kelly Wood (E/O); Lorna Vevers (W)	Lorna Vevers (E/O); Anne Laird (W)
2010–11	Eve Muirhead	Kelly Wood (E); Anna Sloan (Jr)	Lorna Vevers (E); Vicki Adams (Jr)	Anne Laird (E); Rhiann Macleod (Jr)
2011–12	Eve Muirhead	Anna Sloan	Vicki Adams	Claire Hamilton
2012–13	Eve Muirhead	Anna Sloan	Vicki Adams	Claire Hamilton
2013–14	Eve Muirhead	Anna Sloan	Vicki Adams	Claire Hamilton
2014–15	Eve Muirhead	Anna Sloan	Vicki Adams	Sarah Reid
2015–16	Eve Muirhead	Anna Sloan	Vicki Adams	Sarah Reid
2016–17	Eve Muirhead	Anna Sloan	Vicki Adams	Lauren Gray
2017–18	Eve Muirhead	Anna Sloan	Vicki Adams	Lauren Gray
2018–19	Eve Muirhead	Jennifer Dodds	Vicki Chalmers (Adams)	Lauren Gray
2019–20	Eve Muirhead	Lauren Gray	Jennifer Dodds	Vicky Wright
2020–21	Eve Muirhead	Vicky Wright	Jennifer Dodds	Lauren Gray
2021–22	Eve Muirhead	Vicky Wright	Jennifer Dodds	Hailey Duff

Jr=Junior, E=European, W=World, O=Olympics.

== Grand Slam record ==
Key
C	Champion
F	Lost in Final
SF	Lost in Semifinal
QF	Lost in Quarterfinals
R16	Lost in the round of 16
Q	Did not advance to playoffs
T2	Played in Tier 2 event
DNP	Did not participate in event
N/A	Not a Grand Slam event that season

Event	2010–11	2011–12	2012–13	2013–14	2014–15	2015–16	2016–17	2017–18	2018–19	2019–20	2020–21	2021–22
Masters	N/A	N/A	SF	F	Q	Q	Q	SF	Q	Q	N/A	DNP
Tour Challenge	N/A	N/A	N/A	N/A	N/A	QF	DNP	SF	DNP	DNP	N/A	N/A
The National	N/A	N/A	N/A	N/A	N/A	DNP	Q	DNP	QF	QF	N/A	DNP
Canadian Open	N/A	N/A	N/A	N/A	C	SF	DNP	DNP	SF	Q	N/A	N/A
Players'	SF	Q	C	QF	C	C	QF	QF	DNP	N/A	Q	QF
Champions Cup	N/A	N/A	N/A	N/A	N/A	Q	Q	SF	SF (Note: Muirhead spared for Anna Hasselborg, who was competing at the 2019 World Mixed Doubles Curling Championship)	N/A	Q	DNP

=== Former events ===
Event	2010–11	2011–12	2012–13	2013–14	2014–15
Colonial Square	N/A	N/A	R16	DNP	C
Autumn Gold	Q	Q	DNP	C	DNP
Manitoba Liquor & Lotteries	DNP	DNP	DNP	Q	N/A
Sobeys Slam	SF	N/A	N/A	N/A	N/A

=== Circuit wins ===
World Curling Tour

- Arctic Cup: 2019
- Bernese Ladies Cup: 2014
- European Masters: 2015
- Glynhill International: 2017
- Masters Basel: 2016
- Perth Masters: 2016, 2020
- Oakville Fall Classic: 2019
- ZO Tournament: 2009

Other wins

- The Challenger: 2021
- Continental Cup (curling): 2012, 2019, 2020

== Awards ==
=== Individual ===
- BBC Scotland Young Sports Personality of the Year: 2009
- Perth & Kinross Sports Personality of the Year: 2009, 2011, 2013, 2022
- Perth Guildry Sports Personality of the Year: 2010
- Stirling Sports Person of the Year: 2013
- (WCF) Frances Brodie Award: 2012
- (SJA) Spirit of Sport Award: 2023
- Freedom of the City (Perth): 2023
- BBC Sports Personality of the Year: 2022 (3rd)
- In 2022, Muirhead also received nominations for BT Sport Action, Sunday Times, and Scottish Women in Sport Sportswoman of the Year awards.

=== Team awards ===
(for Team Muirhead / Scotland / Team GB)

- Team of the Year (Sportscotland): 2022
- (SW/S) Team of the Year: 2022
- (RCCC) Team of the Year: 2011, 2013, 2022
- (SJA) Team of the Year: 2022 (3rd)
