= 2016 Players' Championship =

Grand Slam of Curling event

- Host city: Toronto, Ontario
- Arena: Mattamy Athletic Centre
- Dates: April 12–17
- Men's winner: (Newfoundland and Labrador) Brad Gushue
- Curling club: Bally Haly G&CC, St. John's
- Skip: Brad Gushue
- Third: Mark Nichols
- Second: Brett Gallant
- Lead: Geoff Walker
- Finalist: (Ontario) Brad Jacobs
- Women's winner: (Scotland) Eve Muirhead
- Curling club: Dunkeld CC, Pitlochry
- Skip: Eve Muirhead
- Third: Cathy Overton-Clapham
- Second: Vicki Adams
- Lead: Sarah Reid
- Finalist: (Manitoba) Jennifer Jones

The 2016 Players' Championship was held from April 12 to 17 at the Mattamy Athletic Centre in Toronto, Ontario. It was the sixth men's and fifth women's Grand Slam of the 2015–16 World Curling Tour.

Newfoundland's Brad Gushue rink won their first men's title while Scotland's Eve Muirhead won her third women's title.

== Men ==
=== Teams ===
The teams are listed as follows:

| Skip | Third | Second | Lead | Locale |
|---|---|---|---|---|
| Reid Carruthers | Braeden Moskowy | Derek Samagalski | Colin Hodgson | West St. Paul, Manitoba |
| Niklas Edin | Oskar Eriksson | Kristian Lindström | Christoffer Sundgren | Karlstad, Sweden |
| John Epping | Mat Camm | Patrick Janssen | Tim March | Toronto, Ontario |
| Brad Gushue | Mark Nichols | Brett Gallant | Geoff Walker | St. John's, Newfoundland and Labrador |
| Glenn Howard | Richard Hart | Adam Spencer | Craig Savill | Penetanguishene, Ontario |
| Brad Jacobs | Ryan Fry | E. J. Harnden | Ryan Harnden | Sault Ste. Marie, Ontario |
| Kevin Koe | Marc Kennedy | Brent Laing | Ben Hebert | Calgary, Alberta |
| Steve Laycock | Kirk Muyres | Colton Flasch | Dallan Muyres | Saskatoon, Saskatchewan |
| Mike McEwen | B. J. Neufeld | Matt Wozniak | Denni Neufeld | Winnipeg, Manitoba |
| David Murdoch | Greg Drummond | Scott Andrews | Michael Goodfellow | Aberdeen, Scotland |
| John Shuster | Tyler George | Pat Simmons | Matt Hamilton | (United States) Duluth, Minnesota |
| Charley Thomas | Matt Dunstone | Brandon Klassen | D. J. Kidby | Calgary, Alberta |

=== Round Robin Standings ===
Key
| Teams to Playoffs |
| Teams to Tiebreakers |

Final Round Robin Standings

| Pool A | W | L | PF | PA |
|---|---|---|---|---|
| (Alberta) Kevin Koe | 4 | 1 | 26 | 21 |
| (Ontario) Brad Jacobs | 3 | 2 | 26 | 18 |
| (Ontario) Glenn Howard | 3 | 2 | 25 | 20 |
| (Alberta) Charley Thomas | 2 | 3 | 24 | 24 |
| (Sweden) Niklas Edin | 2 | 3 | 20 | 25 |
| (Manitoba) Reid Carruthers | 1 | 4 | 15 | 28 |

| Pool B | W | L | PF | PA |
|---|---|---|---|---|
| (Newfoundland and Labrador) Brad Gushue | 5 | 0 | 27 | 18 |
| (Scotland) David Murdoch | 3 | 2 | 30 | 29 |
| (Saskatchewan) Steve Laycock | 3 | 2 | 28 | 21 |
| (Manitoba) Mike McEwen | 2 | 3 | 21 | 27 |
| (United States) John Shuster | 1 | 4 | 22 | 28 |
| (Ontario) John Epping | 1 | 4 | 23 | 28 |

=== Round Robin Results ===
==== Draw 1 ====
Tuesday, April 12, 7:00 pm

| Sheet B | 1 | 2 | 3 | 4 | 5 | 6 | 7 | 8 | Final |
| (Newfoundland and Labrador) Brad Gushue | 1 | 0 | 2 | 0 | 1 | 0 | 0 | 1 | 5 |
| (United States) John Shuster 🔨 | 0 | 1 | 0 | 1 | 0 | 1 | 0 | 0 | 3 |

| Sheet C | 1 | 2 | 3 | 4 | 5 | 6 | 7 | 8 | Final |
| (Ontario) John Epping | 0 | 1 | 0 | 1 | 1 | 0 | 0 | 0 | 3 |
| (Saskatchewan) Steve Laycock 🔨 | 2 | 0 | 1 | 0 | 0 | 1 | 1 | 1 | 6 |

==== Draw 2 ====
Wednesday, April 13, 8:30 am

| Sheet D | 1 | 2 | 3 | 4 | 5 | 6 | 7 | 8 | 9 | Final |
| (Manitoba) Mike McEwen 🔨 | 1 | 0 | 2 | 0 | 2 | 0 | 1 | 0 | 1 | 7 |
| (Scotland) David Murdoch | 0 | 2 | 0 | 1 | 0 | 1 | 0 | 2 | 0 | 6 |

==== Draw 3 ====
Wednesday, April 13, 12:00 pm

| Sheet A | 1 | 2 | 3 | 4 | 5 | 6 | 7 | 8 | Final |
| (Alberta) Kevin Koe 🔨 | 0 | 3 | 0 | 0 | 1 | 0 | 2 | 0 | 6 |
| (Alberta) Charley Thomas | 0 | 0 | 2 | 0 | 0 | 1 | 0 | 1 | 4 |

| Sheet B | 1 | 2 | 3 | 4 | 5 | 6 | 7 | 8 | Final |
| (Manitoba) Reid Carruthers 🔨 | 0 | 1 | 0 | 0 | 1 | 1 | 0 | 1 | 4 |
| (Sweden) Niklas Edin | 0 | 0 | 1 | 0 | 0 | 0 | 1 | 0 | 2 |

| Sheet D | 1 | 2 | 3 | 4 | 5 | 6 | 7 | 8 | Final |
| (Ontario) Brad Jacobs | 1 | 0 | 1 | 0 | 4 | 0 | 0 | X | 6 |
| (Ontario) Glenn Howard 🔨 | 0 | 1 | 0 | 2 | 0 | 1 | 0 | X | 4 |

| Sheet E | 1 | 2 | 3 | 4 | 5 | 6 | 7 | 8 | Final |
| (Newfoundland and Labrador) Brad Gushue 🔨 | 2 | 0 | 2 | 0 | 0 | 3 | 0 | X | 7 |
| (Ontario) John Epping | 0 | 2 | 0 | 1 | 1 | 0 | 1 | X | 5 |

==== Draw 4 ====
Wednesday, April 13, 3:30 pm

| Sheet C | 1 | 2 | 3 | 4 | 5 | 6 | 7 | 8 | 9 | Final |
| (Scotland) David Murdoch 🔨 | 1 | 0 | 0 | 1 | 0 | 2 | 0 | 2 | 2 | 8 |
| (United States) John Shuster | 0 | 2 | 1 | 0 | 2 | 0 | 1 | 0 | 0 | 6 |

==== Draw 5 ====
Wednesday, April 13, 7:00 pm

| Sheet A | 1 | 2 | 3 | 4 | 5 | 6 | 7 | 8 | Final |
| (Manitoba) Mike McEwen | 0 | 1 | 0 | 0 | 0 | 0 | X | X | 1 |
| (Saskatchewan) Steve Laycock 🔨 | 1 | 0 | 2 | 1 | 1 | 2 | X | X | 7 |

| Sheet B | 1 | 2 | 3 | 4 | 5 | 6 | 7 | 8 | Final |
| (Alberta) Kevin Koe | 0 | 1 | 0 | 1 | 1 | 0 | 3 | 0 | 6 |
| (Ontario) Glenn Howard 🔨 | 0 | 0 | 1 | 0 | 0 | 2 | 0 | 1 | 4 |

| Sheet C | 1 | 2 | 3 | 4 | 5 | 6 | 7 | 8 | Final |
| (Sweden) Niklas Edin 🔨 | 0 | 1 | 0 | 1 | 0 | 3 | 0 | 1 | 6 |
| (Alberta) Charley Thomas | 1 | 0 | 0 | 0 | 2 | 0 | 1 | 0 | 4 |

| Sheet E | 1 | 2 | 3 | 4 | 5 | 6 | 7 | 8 | Final |
| (Manitoba) Reid Carruthers 🔨 | 0 | 0 | 1 | 0 | 1 | 0 | X | X | 2 |
| (Ontario) Brad Jacobs | 1 | 0 | 0 | 2 | 0 | 3 | X | X | 6 |

==== Draw 6 ====
Thursday, April 14, 8:30 am

| Sheet A | 1 | 2 | 3 | 4 | 5 | 6 | 7 | 8 | Final |
| (Ontario) John Epping | 1 | 0 | 1 | 0 | 2 | 0 | 0 | X | 4 |
| (United States) John Shuster 🔨 | 0 | 1 | 0 | 2 | 0 | 2 | 1 | X | 6 |

| Sheet B | 1 | 2 | 3 | 4 | 5 | 6 | 7 | 8 | Final |
| (Saskatchewan) Steve Laycock 🔨 | 2 | 0 | 1 | 0 | 1 | 0 | 2 | 0 | 6 |
| (Scotland) David Murdoch | 0 | 1 | 0 | 2 | 0 | 3 | 0 | 2 | 8 |

==== Draw 7 ====
Thursday, April 14, 12:00 pm

| Sheet A | 1 | 2 | 3 | 4 | 5 | 6 | 7 | 8 | Final |
| (Ontario) Brad Jacobs 🔨 | 0 | 0 | 1 | 0 | 1 | 0 | 3 | 0 | 5 |
| (Sweden) Niklas Edin | 0 | 0 | 0 | 3 | 0 | 2 | 0 | 1 | 6 |

| Sheet D | 1 | 2 | 3 | 4 | 5 | 6 | 7 | 8 | Final |
| (Alberta) Kevin Koe 🔨 | 1 | 2 | 0 | 0 | 0 | 0 | 2 | X | 5 |
| (Manitoba) Reid Carruthers | 0 | 0 | 1 | 2 | 0 | 0 | 0 | X | 3 |

| Sheet E | 1 | 2 | 3 | 4 | 5 | 6 | 7 | 8 | Final |
| (Ontario) Glenn Howard | 0 | 0 | 0 | 0 | 3 | 0 | 3 | X | 6 |
| (Alberta) Charley Thomas 🔨 | 0 | 0 | 0 | 1 | 0 | 2 | 0 | X | 3 |

==== Draw 8 ====
Thursday, April 14, 3:30 pm

| Sheet C | 1 | 2 | 3 | 4 | 5 | 6 | 7 | 8 | 9 | Final |
| (Newfoundland and Labrador) Brad Gushue 🔨 | 0 | 2 | 0 | 1 | 0 | 0 | 1 | 0 | 1 | 5 |
| (Manitoba) Mike McEwen | 0 | 0 | 2 | 0 | 0 | 1 | 0 | 1 | 0 | 4 |

| Sheet D | 1 | 2 | 3 | 4 | 5 | 6 | 7 | 8 | Final |
| (Saskatchewan) Steve Laycock | 0 | 2 | 0 | 1 | 0 | 0 | 0 | 2 | 5 |
| (United States) John Shuster 🔨 | 1 | 0 | 1 | 0 | 0 | 1 | 1 | 0 | 4 |

| Sheet E | 1 | 2 | 3 | 4 | 5 | 6 | 7 | 8 | 9 | 10 | Final |
|---|---|---|---|---|---|---|---|---|---|---|---|
| (Ontario) John Epping | 0 | 1 | 0 | 2 | 0 | 0 | 0 | 2 | 0 | 0 | 5 |
| (Scotland) David Murdoch 🔨 | 2 | 0 | 1 | 0 | 0 | 0 | 2 | 0 | 0 | 1 | 6 |

==== Draw 9 ====
Thursday, April 14, 7:00 pm

| Sheet D | 1 | 2 | 3 | 4 | 5 | 6 | 7 | 8 | Final |
| (Sweden) Niklas Edin | 0 | 0 | 0 | 1 | 0 | 2 | 0 | 0 | 3 |
| (Ontario) Glenn Howard 🔨 | 0 | 0 | 2 | 0 | 1 | 0 | 0 | 1 | 4 |

==== Draw 11 ====
Friday, April 15, 12:00 pm

| Sheet A | 1 | 2 | 3 | 4 | 5 | 6 | 7 | 8 | Final |
| (Manitoba) Mike McEwen 🔨 | 1 | 0 | 0 | 2 | 0 | 2 | 0 | 1 | 6 |
| (United States) John Shuster | 0 | 0 | 1 | 0 | 1 | 0 | 1 | 0 | 3 |

| Sheet B | 1 | 2 | 3 | 4 | 5 | 6 | 7 | 8 | Final |
| (Ontario) Brad Jacobs | 0 | 0 | 1 | 0 | 0 | 1 | 0 | X | 2 |
| (Alberta) Charley Thomas 🔨 | 1 | 0 | 0 | 1 | 0 | 0 | 3 | X | 5 |

| Sheet C | 1 | 2 | 3 | 4 | 5 | 6 | 7 | 8 | Final |
| (Ontario) Glenn Howard 🔨 | 2 | 1 | 0 | 1 | 1 | 1 | 1 | X | 7 |
| (Manitoba) Reid Carruthers | 0 | 0 | 2 | 0 | 0 | 0 | 0 | X | 2 |

| Sheet D | 1 | 2 | 3 | 4 | 5 | 6 | 7 | 8 | Final |
| (Newfoundland and Labrador) Brad Gushue 🔨 | 0 | 0 | 1 | 0 | 4 | 0 | 0 | X | 5 |
| (Scotland) David Murdoch | 0 | 0 | 0 | 1 | 0 | 0 | 1 | X | 2 |

| Sheet E | 1 | 2 | 3 | 4 | 5 | 6 | 7 | 8 | Final |
| (Alberta) Kevin Koe 🔨 | 0 | 3 | 1 | 0 | 1 | 3 | X | X | 8 |
| (Sweden) Niklas Edin | 1 | 0 | 0 | 2 | 0 | 0 | X | X | 3 |

==== Draw 13 ====
Friday, April 15, 7:00 pm

| Sheet B | 1 | 2 | 3 | 4 | 5 | 6 | 7 | 8 | Final |
| (Manitoba) Mike McEwen | 0 | 0 | 1 | 1 | 0 | 1 | 0 | 0 | 3 |
| (Ontario) John Epping 🔨 | 2 | 0 | 0 | 0 | 1 | 0 | 2 | 1 | 6 |

| Sheet C | 1 | 2 | 3 | 4 | 5 | 6 | 7 | 8 | Final |
| (Alberta) Kevin Koe | 0 | 1 | 0 | 0 | 0 | 0 | X | X | 1 |
| (Ontario) Brad Jacobs 🔨 | 3 | 0 | 0 | 1 | 1 | 2 | X | X | 7 |

| Sheet D | 1 | 2 | 3 | 4 | 5 | 6 | 7 | 8 | Final |
| (Manitoba) Reid Carruthers 🔨 | 0 | 0 | 1 | 0 | 0 | 2 | 1 | 0 | 4 |
| (Alberta) Charley Thomas | 0 | 1 | 0 | 0 | 3 | 0 | 0 | 4 | 8 |

| Sheet E | 1 | 2 | 3 | 4 | 5 | 6 | 7 | 8 | Final |
| (Newfoundland and Labrador) Brad Gushue | 0 | 0 | 1 | 0 | 2 | 1 | 0 | 1 | 5 |
| (Saskatchewan) Steve Laycock 🔨 | 0 | 1 | 0 | 2 | 0 | 0 | 1 | 0 | 4 |

=== Tiebreaker ===
Saturday, April 16, 8:30 am

| Team | 1 | 2 | 3 | 4 | 5 | 6 | 7 | 8 | Final |
| (Alberta) Charley Thomas 🔨 | 0 | 1 | 0 | 1 | 0 | 2 | 0 | 0 | 4 |
| (Sweden) Niklas Edin | 1 | 0 | 2 | 0 | 1 | 0 | 0 | 1 | 5 |

=== Playoffs ===
Quarterfinals
(Newfoundland and Labrador) Brad Gushue | 7
(Sweden) Niklas Edin | 3
(Scotland) David Murdoch | 8
(Ontario) Glenn Howard | 2
(Alberta) Kevin Koe | 5
(Manitoba) Mike McEwen | 8
(Ontario) Brad Jacobs | 6
(Saskatchewan) Steve Laycock | 2

Semifinals
(Newfoundland and Labrador) Brad Gushue | 6
(Scotland) David Murdoch | 2
(Manitoba) Mike McEwen | 3
(Ontario) Brad Jacobs | 7

Final
(Newfoundland and Labrador) Brad Gushue | 5
(Ontario) Brad Jacobs | 4

==== Quarterfinals ====
Saturday, April 16, 03:30 pm

| Team | 1 | 2 | 3 | 4 | 5 | 6 | 7 | 8 | Final |
| (Newfoundland and Labrador) Brad Gushue 🔨 | 1 | 0 | 2 | 0 | 3 | 0 | 1 | X | 7 |
| (Sweden) Niklas Edin | 0 | 0 | 0 | 2 | 0 | 1 | 0 | X | 3 |

| Team | 1 | 2 | 3 | 4 | 5 | 6 | 7 | 8 | Final |
| (Scotland) David Murdoch 🔨 | 1 | 0 | 3 | 0 | 2 | 2 | X | X | 8 |
| (Ontario) Glenn Howard | 0 | 1 | 0 | 1 | 0 | 0 | X | X | 2 |

| Team | 1 | 2 | 3 | 4 | 5 | 6 | 7 | 8 | Final |
| (Alberta) Kevin Koe 🔨 | 0 | 1 | 0 | 2 | 0 | 2 | 0 | X | 5 |
| (Manitoba) Mike McEwen | 1 | 0 | 1 | 0 | 3 | 0 | 3 | X | 8 |

| Team | 1 | 2 | 3 | 4 | 5 | 6 | 7 | 8 | Final |
| (Ontario) Brad Jacobs 🔨 | 2 | 0 | 0 | 1 | 2 | 0 | 1 | X | 6 |
| (Saskatchewan) Steve Laycock | 0 | 1 | 0 | 0 | 0 | 1 | 0 | X | 2 |

==== Semifinals ====
Sunday, April 17, 10:00 am

| Team | 1 | 2 | 3 | 4 | 5 | 6 | 7 | 8 | Final |
| (Newfoundland and Labrador) Brad Gushue 🔨 | 2 | 0 | 0 | 0 | 2 | 0 | 2 | X | 6 |
| (Scotland) David Murdoch | 0 | 0 | 1 | 0 | 0 | 1 | 0 | X | 2 |

| Team | 1 | 2 | 3 | 4 | 5 | 6 | 7 | 8 | Final |
| (Manitoba) Mike McEwen | 1 | 0 | 0 | 0 | 0 | 2 | 0 | X | 3 |
| (Ontario) Brad Jacobs 🔨 | 0 | 0 | 2 | 3 | 1 | 0 | 1 | X | 7 |

==== Final ====
Sunday, April 17, 5:00 pm

| Team | 1 | 2 | 3 | 4 | 5 | 6 | 7 | 8 | Final |
| (Newfoundland and Labrador) Brad Gushue 🔨 | 1 | 1 | 0 | 1 | 0 | 2 | 0 | 0 | 5 |
| (Ontario) Brad Jacobs | 0 | 0 | 2 | 0 | 1 | 0 | 1 | 0 | 4 |

== Women ==
=== Teams ===
The teams are listed as follows:

| Skip | Third | Second | Lead | Locale |
|---|---|---|---|---|
| Erika Brown | Allison Pottinger | Nicole Joraanstad | Natalie Nicholson | (United States) Madison, Wisconsin |
| Chelsea Carey | Kristy McDonald | Jocelyn Peterman | Laine Peters | Calgary, Alberta |
| Kerri Einarson | Selena Kaatz | Liz Fyfe | Kristin MacCuish | Winnipeg, Manitoba |
| Tracy Fleury | Crystal Webster | Jenna Walsh | Jenn Horgan | Sudbury, Ontario |
| Rachel Homan | Emma Miskew | Joanne Courtney | Lisa Weagle | Ottawa, Ontario |
| Jennifer Jones | Kaitlyn Lawes | Jill Officer | Dawn McEwen | Winnipeg, Manitoba |
| Eve Muirhead | Cathy Overton-Clapham | Vicki Adams | Sarah Reid | Stirling, Scotland |
| Alina Pätz | Nadine Lehmann | Briar Hürlimann | Nicole Schwägli | Zürich, Switzerland |
| Kelsey Rocque | Laura Crocker | Taylor McDonald | Jen Gates | Edmonton, Alberta |
| Anna Sidorova | Margarita Fomina | Alexandra Raeva | Alina Kovaleva | Moscow, Russia |
| Valerie Sweeting | Lori Olson-Johns | Dana Ferguson | Rachelle Brown | Edmonton, Alberta |
| Silvana Tirinzoni | Manuela Siegrist | Esther Neuenschwander | Marlene Albrecht | Aarau, Switzerland |

=== Round Robin Standings ===
Final Round Robin Standings

| Pool A | W | L | PF | PA |
|---|---|---|---|---|
| (Switzerland) Silvana Tirinzoni | 4 | 1 | 31 | 20 |
| (Ontario) Rachel Homan | 4 | 1 | 34 | 15 |
| (Manitoba) Kerri Einarson | 3 | 2 | 26 | 27 |
| (United States) Erika Brown | 2 | 3 | 25 | 28 |
| (Ontario) Tracy Fleury | 1 | 4 | 22 | 30 |
| (Alberta) Chelsea Carey | 1 | 4 | 15 | 33 |

| Pool B | W | L | PF | PA |
|---|---|---|---|---|
| (Manitoba) Jennifer Jones | 4 | 1 | 26 | 17 |
| (Scotland) Eve Muirhead | 4 | 1 | 27 | 24 |
| (Alberta) Kelsey Rocque | 3 | 2 | 27 | 27 |
| (Alberta) Valerie Sweeting | 2 | 3 | 25 | 25 |
| (Switzerland) Alina Pätz | 1 | 4 | 29 | 27 |
| (Russia) Anna Sidorova | 1 | 4 | 19 | 33 |

=== Round Robin Results ===
==== Draw 1 ====
Tuesday, April 12, 7:00 pm

| Sheet A | 1 | 2 | 3 | 4 | 5 | 6 | 7 | 8 | Final |
| (Manitoba) Jennifer Jones | 0 | 1 | 1 | 0 | 0 | 3 | 0 | X | 5 |
| (Alberta) Kelsey Rocque 🔨 | 0 | 0 | 0 | 2 | 0 | 0 | 1 | X | 3 |

| Sheet D | 1 | 2 | 3 | 4 | 5 | 6 | 7 | 8 | Final |
| (Alberta) Chelsea Carey | 0 | 0 | 1 | 0 | 1 | 0 | 0 | X | 2 |
| (Manitoba) Kerri Einarson 🔨 | 0 | 1 | 0 | 2 | 0 | 0 | 2 | X | 5 |

==== Draw 2 ====
Wednesday, April 13, 8:30 am

| Sheet B | 1 | 2 | 3 | 4 | 5 | 6 | 7 | 8 | Final |
| (Ontario) Rachel Homan | 0 | 0 | 2 | 1 | 0 | 3 | 1 | X | 7 |
| (Ontario) Tracy Fleury🔨 | 0 | 1 | 0 | 0 | 2 | 0 | 0 | X | 3 |

| Sheet C | 1 | 2 | 3 | 4 | 5 | 6 | 7 | 8 | Final |
| (Scotland) Eve Muirhead | 0 | 0 | 2 | 1 | 0 | 2 | 0 | 1 | 6 |
| (Switzerland) Alina Pätz🔨 | 0 | 1 | 0 | 0 | 2 | 0 | 2 | 0 | 5 |

==== Draw 3 ====
Wednesday, April 13, 12:00 pm

| Sheet C | 1 | 2 | 3 | 4 | 5 | 6 | 7 | 8 | 9 | Final |
| (Switzerland) Silvana Tirinzoni 🔨 | 0 | 1 | 1 | 0 | 0 | 0 | 3 | 0 | 1 | 6 |
| (United States) Erika Brown | 0 | 0 | 0 | 2 | 0 | 1 | 0 | 2 | 0 | 5 |

==== Draw 4 ====
Wednesday, April 13, 3:30 pm

| Sheet A | 1 | 2 | 3 | 4 | 5 | 6 | 7 | 8 | 9 | Final |
| (Alberta) Chelsea Carey 🔨 | 0 | 1 | 1 | 0 | 2 | 0 | 1 | 0 | 0 | 5 |
| (Ontario) Tracy Fleury | 0 | 0 | 0 | 2 | 0 | 1 | 0 | 2 | 2 | 7 |

| Sheet B | 1 | 2 | 3 | 4 | 5 | 6 | 7 | 8 | Final |
| (Manitoba) Jennifer Jones | 0 | 1 | 0 | 1 | 0 | 0 | 2 | X | 4 |
| (Switzerland) Alina Pätz 🔨 | 0 | 0 | 1 | 0 | 0 | 1 | 0 | X | 2 |

| Sheet D | 1 | 2 | 3 | 4 | 5 | 6 | 7 | 8 | Final |
| (Alberta) Valerie Sweeting | 0 | 2 | 1 | 0 | 0 | 0 | 1 | 0 | 4 |
| (Russia) Anna Sidorova 🔨 | 2 | 0 | 0 | 1 | 0 | 1 | 0 | 1 | 5 |

| Sheet E | 1 | 2 | 3 | 4 | 5 | 6 | 7 | 8 | Final |
| (Ontario) Rachel Homan 🔨 | 2 | 0 | 2 | 0 | 0 | 4 | X | X | 8 |
| (Manitoba) Kerri Einarson | 0 | 1 | 0 | 2 | 0 | 0 | X | X | 3 |

==== Draw 5 ====
Wednesday, April 13, 7:00 pm

| Sheet D | 1 | 2 | 3 | 4 | 5 | 6 | 7 | 8 | Final |
| (Scotland) Eve Muirhead 🔨 | 1 | 0 | 1 | 0 | 2 | 0 | 1 | X | 5 |
| (Alberta) Kelsey Rocque | 0 | 2 | 0 | 1 | 0 | 5 | 0 | X | 8 |

==== Draw 6 ====
Thursday, April 14, 8:30 am

| Sheet C | 1 | 2 | 3 | 4 | 5 | 6 | 7 | 8 | Final |
| (Manitoba) Kerri Einarson 🔨 | 1 | 1 | 0 | 0 | 0 | 2 | 0 | 2 | 6 |
| (Ontario) Tracy Fleury | 0 | 0 | 1 | 1 | 0 | 0 | 2 | 0 | 4 |

| Sheet D | 1 | 2 | 3 | 4 | 5 | 6 | 7 | 8 | Final |
| (Ontario) Rachel Homan | 1 | 2 | 0 | 2 | 0 | 2 | 0 | X | 7 |
| (United States) Erika Brown 🔨 | 0 | 0 | 1 | 0 | 1 | 0 | 1 | X | 3 |

| Sheet E | 1 | 2 | 3 | 4 | 5 | 6 | 7 | 8 | Final |
| (Alberta) Valerie Sweeting | 0 | 0 | 0 | 1 | 0 | 1 | 1 | 0 | 3 |
| (Scotland) Eve Muirhead 🔨 | 1 | 0 | 1 | 0 | 1 | 0 | 0 | 1 | 4 |

==== Draw 7 ====
Thursday, April 14, 12:00 pm

| Sheet B | 1 | 2 | 3 | 4 | 5 | 6 | 7 | 8 | Final |
| (Switzerland) Silvana Tirinzoni 🔨 | 0 | 2 | 0 | 4 | 0 | 0 | 1 | X | 7 |
| (Alberta) Chelsea Carey | 0 | 0 | 1 | 0 | 0 | 2 | 0 | X | 3 |

| Sheet C | 1 | 2 | 3 | 4 | 5 | 6 | 7 | 8 | Final |
| (Alberta) Kelsey Rocque | 0 | 2 | 0 | 2 | 4 | 0 | 0 | X | 8 |
| (Russia) Anna Sidorova 🔨 | 1 | 0 | 1 | 0 | 0 | 1 | 1 | X | 4 |

==== Draw 8 ====
Thursday, April 14, 3:30 pm

| Sheet A | 1 | 2 | 3 | 4 | 5 | 6 | 7 | 8 | Final |
| (Manitoba) Jennifer Jones | 0 | 0 | 0 | 0 | 1 | 0 | 3 | 0 | 4 |
| (Scotland) Eve Muirhead 🔨 | 2 | 0 | 2 | 1 | 0 | 1 | 0 | 1 | 7 |

| Sheet B | 1 | 2 | 3 | 4 | 5 | 6 | 7 | 8 | Final |
| (United States) Erika Brown 🔨 | 2 | 0 | 1 | 0 | 0 | 3 | 1 | 1 | 8 |
| (Manitoba) Kerri Einarson | 0 | 3 | 0 | 2 | 1 | 0 | 0 | 0 | 6 |

==== Draw 9 ====
Thursday, April 14, 7:00 pm

| Sheet A | 1 | 2 | 3 | 4 | 5 | 6 | 7 | 8 | Final |
| (Russia) Anna Sidorova | 0 | 1 | 0 | 1 | 0 | 0 | X | X | 2 |
| (Switzerland) Alina Pätz 🔨 | 2 | 0 | 2 | 0 | 2 | 4 | X | X | 10 |

| Sheet B | 1 | 2 | 3 | 4 | 5 | 6 | 7 | 8 | Final |
| (Alberta) Valerie Sweeting 🔨 | 2 | 0 | 3 | 0 | 0 | 3 | X | X | 8 |
| (Alberta) Kelsey Rocque | 0 | 0 | 0 | 1 | 1 | 0 | X | X | 2 |

| Sheet C | 1 | 2 | 3 | 4 | 5 | 6 | 7 | 8 | Final |
| (Ontario) Rachel Homan 🔨 | 2 | 1 | 2 | 5 | X | X | X | X | 10 |
| (Alberta) Chelsea Carey | 0 | 0 | 0 | 0 | X | X | X | X | 0 |

| Sheet E | 1 | 2 | 3 | 4 | 5 | 6 | 7 | 8 | Final |
| (Switzerland) Silvana Tirinzoni 🔨 | 2 | 0 | 1 | 0 | 2 | 0 | 2 | X | 7 |
| (Ontario) Tracy Fleury | 0 | 1 | 0 | 1 | 0 | 2 | 0 | X | 4 |

==== Draw 10 ====
Friday, April 15, 8:30 am

| Sheet A | 1 | 2 | 3 | 4 | 5 | 6 | 7 | 8 | Final |
| (Switzerland) Silvana Tirinzoni 🔨 | 1 | 1 | 0 | 1 | 0 | 0 | 2 | 0 | 5 |
| (Manitoba) Kerri Einarson | 0 | 0 | 2 | 0 | 0 | 2 | 0 | 2 | 6 |

| Sheet C | 1 | 2 | 3 | 4 | 5 | 6 | 7 | 8 | Final |
| (Ontario) Tracy Fleury | 0 | 0 | 0 | 3 | 0 | 1 | 0 | 0 | 4 |
| (United States) Erika Brown 🔨 | 0 | 1 | 2 | 0 | 1 | 0 | 0 | 1 | 5 |

| Sheet D | 1 | 2 | 3 | 4 | 5 | 6 | 7 | 8 | Final |
| (Alberta) Valerie Sweeting 🔨 | 4 | 0 | 2 | 0 | 1 | 0 | 2 | X | 9 |
| (Switzerland) Alina Pätz | 0 | 2 | 0 | 3 | 0 | 2 | 0 | X | 7 |

| Sheet E | 1 | 2 | 3 | 4 | 5 | 6 | 7 | 8 | Final |
| (Manitoba) Jennifer Jones 🔨 | 1 | 0 | 2 | 0 | 0 | 3 | 0 | X | 6 |
| (Russia) Anna Sidorova | 0 | 1 | 0 | 1 | 1 | 0 | 1 | X | 4 |

==== Draw 12 ====
Friday, April 15, 3:30 pm

| Sheet A | 1 | 2 | 3 | 4 | 5 | 6 | 7 | 8 | Final |
| (Switzerland) Alina Pätz 🔨 | 1 | 0 | 1 | 2 | 0 | 0 | 1 | 0 | 5 |
| (Alberta) Kelsey Rocque | 0 | 1 | 0 | 0 | 2 | 1 | 0 | 2 | 6 |

| Sheet B | 1 | 2 | 3 | 4 | 5 | 6 | 7 | 8 | Final |
| (Russia) Anna Sidorova 🔨 | 0 | 0 | 1 | 0 | 1 | 0 | 1 | 1 | 4 |
| (Scotland) Eve Muirhead | 1 | 1 | 0 | 2 | 0 | 1 | 0 | 0 | 5 |

| Sheet C | 1 | 2 | 3 | 4 | 5 | 6 | 7 | 8 | Final |
| (Manitoba) Jennifer Jones 🔨 | 1 | 1 | 0 | 3 | 1 | 1 | X | X | 7 |
| (Alberta) Valerie Sweeting | 0 | 0 | 1 | 0 | 0 | 0 | X | X | 1 |

| Sheet D | 1 | 2 | 3 | 4 | 5 | 6 | 7 | 8 | Final |
| (Ontario) Rachel Homan 🔨 | 0 | 1 | 0 | 0 | 1 | 0 | 0 | X | 2 |
| (Switzerland) Silvana Tirinzoni | 0 | 0 | 1 | 1 | 0 | 2 | 2 | X | 6 |

| Sheet E | 1 | 2 | 3 | 4 | 5 | 6 | 7 | 8 | Final |
| (United States) Erika Brown | 0 | 0 | 1 | 1 | 0 | 0 | 2 | X | 4 |
| (Alberta) Chelsea Carey 🔨 | 1 | 1 | 0 | 0 | 2 | 1 | 0 | X | 5 |

=== Playoffs ===
Quarterfinals
(Manitoba) Jennifer Jones | 7
(Alberta) Valerie Sweeting | 4
(Ontario) Rachel Homan | 6
(Manitoba) Kerri Einarson | 7
(Scotland) Eve Muirhead | 12
(United States) Erika Brown | 4
(Switzerland) Silvana Tirinzoni | 3
(Alberta) Kelsey Rocque | 2

Semifinals
(Manitoba) Jennifer Jones | 6
(Manitoba) Kerri Einarson | 4
(Scotland) Eve Muirhead | 7
(Switzerland) Silvana Tirinzoni | 2

Final
(Manitoba) Jennifer Jones | 6
(Scotland) Eve Muirhead | 9

==== Quarterfinals ====
Saturday, April 16, 12:00 pm

| Team | 1 | 2 | 3 | 4 | 5 | 6 | 7 | 8 | Final |
| (Manitoba) Jennifer Jones 🔨 | 2 | 0 | 1 | 2 | 0 | 1 | 0 | 1 | 7 |
| (Alberta) Valerie Sweeting | 0 | 1 | 0 | 0 | 2 | 0 | 1 | 0 | 4 |

| Team | 1 | 2 | 3 | 4 | 5 | 6 | 7 | 8 | Final |
| (Ontario) Rachel Homan 🔨 | 3 | 0 | 3 | 0 | 0 | 0 | 0 | 0 | 6 |
| (Manitoba) Kerri Einarson | 0 | 2 | 0 | 0 | 1 | 1 | 1 | 2 | 7 |

| Team | 1 | 2 | 3 | 4 | 5 | 6 | 7 | 8 | Final |
| (Scotland) Eve Muirhead 🔨 | 2 | 0 | 2 | 3 | 0 | 0 | 5 | X | 12 |
| (United States) Erika Brown | 0 | 1 | 0 | 0 | 2 | 1 | 0 | X | 4 |

| Team | 1 | 2 | 3 | 4 | 5 | 6 | 7 | 8 | Final |
| (Switzerland) Silvana Tirinzoni 🔨 | 0 | 0 | 1 | 1 | 0 | 0 | 0 | 1 | 3 |
| (Alberta) Kelsey Rocque | 0 | 0 | 0 | 0 | 1 | 1 | 0 | 0 | 2 |

==== Semifinals ====
Sunday, April 17, 10:00 am

| Team | 1 | 2 | 3 | 4 | 5 | 6 | 7 | 8 | Final |
| (Manitoba) Jennifer Jones 🔨 | 1 | 0 | 1 | 0 | 2 | 0 | 1 | 1 | 6 |
| (Manitoba) Kerri Einarson | 0 | 1 | 0 | 2 | 0 | 1 | 0 | 0 | 4 |

| Team | 1 | 2 | 3 | 4 | 5 | 6 | 7 | 8 | Final |
| (Scotland) Eve Muirhead 🔨 | 0 | 3 | 0 | 3 | 1 | 0 | X | X | 7 |
| (Switzerland) Silvana Tirinzoni | 0 | 0 | 1 | 0 | 0 | 1 | X | X | 2 |

==== Final ====
Sunday, April 17, 11:30 am

| Sheet C | 1 | 2 | 3 | 4 | 5 | 6 | 7 | 8 | Final |
| (Manitoba) Jennifer Jones | 0 | 0 | 3 | 0 | 1 | 0 | 2 | 0 | 6 |
| (Scotland) Eve Muirhead 🔨 | 1 | 1 | 0 | 2 | 0 | 3 | 0 | 2 | 9 |
