= Greg Drummond =

Scottish curler (born 1989)

- Curler
- Born: 3 February 1989 (age 37); Forfar, Angus. Scotland

Curling career
- World Championship: 4 (2011, 2012, 2013, 2017)
- European Championship: 2 (2012, 2013)
Medal record
Curling
Representing Great Britain
Olympic Games
Silver medal – second place	2014 Sochi
Representing Scotland
World Curling Championships
Silver medal – second place	2011 Regina
Silver medal – second place	2012 Basel
Bronze medal – third place	2013 Victoria
European Curling Championships
Bronze medal – third place	2013 Stavanger

Greg Drummond (born 3 February 1989 in Forfar) is a Scottish curler from Stirling. He is the silver medallist at 2014 Winter Olympics.

== Career ==
Drummond first appeared on the world stage as the alternate for the Scottish team at the 2007 World Junior Curling Championships. The team, skipped by Logan Gray, finished sixth. Drummond made an appearance at the European Junior Curling Challenge in 2009, and represented Great Britain in the Winter University Games in Erzurum with skip Glen Muirhead, finishing fourth after a loss in the bronze medal game.

Drummond joined Tom Brewster in the 2010–11 curling season as his third, and won the Scottish Men's Curling Championship with Brewster in 2011. They represented Scotland at the 2011 Ford World Men's Curling Championship, and finished in second place with a loss in the final to Jeff Stoughton. They won the Scottish championship again in 2012, and repeated a second-place finish in the 2012 World Men's Curling Championship with a loss in the final to Glenn Howard.

On the World Curling Tour, Drummond won two Edinburgh International titles with Brewster in 2011 and 2012 and won the German Masters title with Murdoch in 2013.

In February 2014, Drummond made his Team GB Winter Olympic debut at the Sochi 2014 games alongside David Murdoch, Michael Goodfellow, Scott Andrews and Tom Brewster. The team qualified for Sochi with a bronze at the 2013 European Championships. They progressed into the Olympic finals against Canada and took the silver medal.

In 2023, he was selected as the head coach for Great Britain’s curling teams for the 2026 Winter Olympics, starting with planning and guiding the efforts through the 2024 and 2025 Qualifications, continuing through with Team GB successfully earning berths in each of the three events in Milano Cortina.

== Personal life ==
He is married to fellow curler Vicky Wright. His brother is fellow curler Kerr Drummond.

== Grand Slam record ==
Key
C	Champion
F	Lost in Final
SF	Lost in Semifinal
QF	Lost in Quarterfinals
R16	Lost in the round of 16
Q	Did not advance to playoffs
T2	Played in Tier 2 event
DNP	Did not participate in event
N/A	Not a Grand Slam event that season

Event	2011–12	2012–13	2013–14	2014–15	2015–16	2016–17	2017–18
Masters	DNP	DNP	DNP	Q	Q	QF	DNP
Tour Challenge	N/A	N/A	N/A	N/A	Q	Q	DNP
The National	DNP	DNP	DNP	DNP	DNP	Q	Q
Canadian Open	Q	DNP	DNP	Q	QF	DNP	DNP
Players' Championships	DNP	DNP	Q	DNP	SF	DNP	
Champions Cup	N/A	N/A	N/A	N/A	Q	DNP	
