= 2015 Meridian Canadian Open =

Grand Slam of Curling event

- Host city: Yorkton, Saskatchewan
- Arena: Gallagher Centre
- Dates: December 8–13
- Men's winner: (Ontario) Team Epping
- Curling club: Donalda CC, Toronto
- Skip: John Epping
- Third: Mat Camm
- Second: Pat Janssen
- Lead: Tim March
- Finalist: (Newfoundland and Labrador) Brad Gushue
- Women's winner: (Ontario) Team Homan
- Curling club: Ottawa CC, Ottawa
- Skip: Rachel Homan
- Third: Emma Miskew
- Second: Joanne Courtney
- Lead: Lisa Weagle
- Finalist: (Manitoba) Jennifer Jones

The 2015 Meridian Canadian Open was held from December 8 to 13 at the Gallagher Centre in Yorkton, Saskatchewan. The Canadian Open was the fourth Grand Slam of the 2015–16 curling season.

On the women's side, the Rachel Homan rink from Ottawa continued their dominance, winning their third straight Slam, defeating the Olympic champion Jennifer Jones rink of Winnipeg in the final, 8–7.

On the men's side, the John Epping rink of Toronto won their first career slam as a team (Epping's third), defeating 2006 Olympic champion Brad Gushue of St. John's, Newfoundland and Labrador 7–4.

== Men ==
=== Teams ===
Skip	Third	Second	Lead	Locale
Brendan Bottcher	Tom Appelman	Brad Thiessen	Karrick Martin	Edmonton, Alberta
Reid Carruthers	Braeden Moskowy	Derek Samagalski	Colin Hodgson	West St. Paul, Manitoba
Adam Casey	David Mathers	Anson Carmody	Robbie Doherty	Charlottetown, Prince Edward Island
Jim Cotter	Ryan Kuhn	Tyrel Griffith	Rick Sawatsky	Kelowna/Vernon, British Columbia
Niklas Edin	Oskar Eriksson	Kristian Lindström	Christoffer Sundgren	Karlstad, Sweden
John Epping	Mat Camm	Pat Janssen	Tim March	Toronto, Ontario
Brad Gushue	Mark Nichols	Brett Gallant	Geoff Walker	St. John's, Newfoundland and Labrador
Glenn Howard	Wayne Middaugh	Richard Hart	Scott Howard	Penetanguishene, Ontario
Brad Jacobs	Ryan Fry	E. J. Harnden	Ryan Harnden	Sault Ste. Marie, Ontario
Kevin Koe	Marc Kennedy	Brent Laing	Ben Hebert	Calgary, Alberta
Steve Laycock	Kirk Muyres	Colton Flasch	Dallan Muyres	Saskatoon, Saskatchewan
Mike McEwen	B. J. Neufeld	Matt Wozniak	Denni Neufeld	Winnipeg, Manitoba
Sven Michel	Marc Pfister	Enrico Pfister	Simon Gempeler	Adelboden, Switzerland
David Murdoch	Greg Drummond	Scott Andrews	Michael Goodfellow	Stirling, Scotland
John Shuster	Tyler George	Matt Hamilton	John Landsteiner	(United States) Duluth, Minnesota
Pat Simmons	John Morris	Matt Dunstone	Nolan Thiessen	Calgary, Alberta

=== Knockout Draw Brackets ===
The draw is listed as follows:

==== A event ====
First Knockout				Qualifier 1
(Manitoba) Mike McEwen	6
(Switzerland) Sven Michel	4	(Manitoba) Mike McEwen	5
(Alberta) Brendan Bottcher	2	(Ontario) John Epping	6
(Ontario) John Epping	4			(Ontario) John Epping	9
(Sweden) Niklas Edin	9			(Alberta) Kevin Koe	3
(United States) John Shuster	4	(Sweden) Niklas Edin	5
(Alberta) Kevin Koe	7	(Alberta) Kevin Koe	7
(Alberta) Pat Simmons	3

First Knockout				Qualifier 2
(Saskatchewan) Steve Laycock	6
(British Columbia) Jim Cotter	2	(Saskatchewan) Steve Laycock	4
(Ontario) Brad Jacobs	4	(Scotland) David Murdoch	5
(Scotland) David Murdoch	6			(Scotland) David Murdoch	5
(Manitoba) Reid Carruthers	5			(Newfoundland and Labrador) Brad Gushue	7
(Ontario) Glenn Howard	4	(Manitoba) Reid Carruthers	3
(Newfoundland and Labrador) Brad Gushue	8	(Newfoundland and Labrador) Brad Gushue	6
(Prince Edward Island) Adam Casey	2

==== B event ====
Second Knockout				Qualifier 3
(Switzerland) Sven Michel	3
(Alberta) Brendan Bottcher	9	(Alberta) Brendan Bottcher	8
(United States) John Shuster	7	(United States) John Shuster	1
(Alberta) Pat Simmons	6			(Alberta) Brendan Bottcher	5
				(Scotland) David Murdoch	6

Second Knockout				Qualifier 4
(British Columbia) Jim Cotter	3
(Ontario) Brad Jacobs	7	(Ontario) Brad Jacobs	3
(Ontario) Glenn Howard	3	(Prince Edward Island) Adam Casey	2
(Prince Edward Island) Adam Casey	9			(Ontario) Brad Jacobs	3
				(Alberta) Kevin Koe	5

Second Knockout		Qualifier 5
(Manitoba) Mike McEwen	2
(Sweden) Niklas Edin	7	(Sweden) Niklas Edin	4
(Saskatchewan) Steve Laycock	3	(Manitoba) Reid Carruthers	6
(Manitoba) Reid Carruthers	7

==== C event ====
Third Knockout				Qualifier 6
(Switzerland) Sven Michel	3
(Alberta) Pat Simmons	7	(Alberta) Pat Simmons	5
		(Saskatchewan) Steve Laycock	6
				(Saskatchewan) Steve Laycock	7
				(Ontario) Brad Jacobs	3

Third Knockout				Qualifier 7
(British Columbia) Jim Cotter	5
(Ontario) Glenn Howard	3	(British Columbia) Jim Cotter	2
		(Manitoba) Mike McEwen	5
				(Manitoba) Mike McEwen	6
				(Alberta) Brendan Bottcher	9

Third Knockout		Qualifier 8
(United States) John Shuster	3
(Prince Edward Island) Adam Casey	7	(Prince Edward Island) Adam Casey	4
		(Sweden) Niklas Edin	7

=== Knockout results ===
All draw times are listed in Central Time (UTC−06:00).

==== Draw 1 ====
Tuesday, December 8, 7:00 pm

Sheet C	1	2	3	4	5	6	7	8	Final
(Saskatchewan) Steve Laycock 🔨	0	0	2	0	1	0	3	X	6
(British Columbia) Jim Cotter	0	0	0	1	0	1	0	X	2

Sheet D	1	2	3	4	5	6	7	8	Final
(Manitoba) Reid Carruthers 🔨	0	0	0	3	0	0	0	2	5
(Ontario) Glenn Howard	0	0	0	0	1	1	2	0	4

Sheet E	1	2	3	4	5	6	7	8	Final
(Newfoundland and Labrador) Brad Gushue 🔨	0	0	0	1	0	3	1	3	8
(Prince Edward Island) Adam Casey	0	0	0	0	2	0	0	0	2

==== Draw 3 ====
Wednesday, December 9, 11:00 am

Sheet A	1	2	3	4	5	6	7	8	Final
(Manitoba) Mike McEwen 🔨	1	0	0	2	0	2	0	1	6
(Switzerland) Sven Michel	0	0	2	0	1	0	1	0	4

Sheet B	1	2	3	4	5	6	7	8	Final
(Sweden) Niklas Edin 🔨	2	3	0	2	0	2	X	X	9
(United States) John Shuster	0	0	3	0	1	0	X	X	4

Sheet C	1	2	3	4	5	6	7	8	Final
(Alberta) Kevin Koe 🔨	2	0	2	3	0	0	X	X	7
(Alberta) Pat Simmons	0	2	0	0	0	1	X	X	3

Sheet D	1	2	3	4	5	6	7	8	Final
(Alberta) Brendan Bottcher	0	0	1	0	1	0	0	X	2
(Ontario) John Epping 🔨	1	0	0	2	0	1	0	X	4

Sheet E	1	2	3	4	5	6	7	8	Final
(Ontario) Brad Jacobs	0	2	0	0	2	0	0	0	4
(Scotland) David Murdoch 🔨	0	0	1	1	0	2	1	1	6

==== Draw 5 ====
Wednesday, December 9, 6:30 pm

Sheet A	1	2	3	4	5	6	7	8	Final
(British Columbia) Jim Cotter	0	1	1	0	0	1	0	X	3
(Ontario) Brad Jacobs 🔨	1	0	0	2	2	0	2	X	7

Sheet B	1	2	3	4	5	6	7	8	Final
(Ontario) Glenn Howard 🔨	2	0	0	0	1	X	X	X	3
(Prince Edward Island) Adam Casey	0	1	3	5	0	X	X	X	9

Sheet C	1	2	3	4	5	6	7	8	Final
(Manitoba) Reid Carruthers	0	1	0	1	0	1	X	X	3
(Newfoundland and Labrador) Brad Gushue 🔨	2	0	2	0	2	0	X	X	6

Sheet D	1	2	3	4	5	6	7	8	9	Final
(Saskatchewan) Steve Laycock	2	0	0	1	0	0	0	1	0	4
(Scotland) David Murdoch 🔨	0	0	2	0	1	0	1	0	1	5

Sheet E	1	2	3	4	5	6	7	8	Final
(Sweden) Niklas Edin 🔨	1	0	2	0	1	0	1	0	5
(Alberta) Kevin Koe	0	2	0	2	0	2	0	1	7

==== Draw 7 ====
Thursday, December 10, 11:00 am

Sheet A	1	2	3	4	5	6	7	8	Final
(United States) John Shuster	0	0	3	0	3	1	0	0	7
(Alberta) Pat Simmons 🔨	0	3	0	1	0	0	1	1	6

Sheet B	1	2	3	4	5	6	7	8	Final
(Switzerland) Sven Michel 🔨	0	2	0	0	1	0	0	X	3
(Alberta) Brendan Bottcher	1	0	4	0	0	1	3	X	9

Sheet C	1	2	3	4	5	6	7	8	9	Final
(Manitoba) Mike McEwen 🔨	0	2	0	0	2	0	0	1	0	5
(Ontario) John Epping	0	0	2	2	0	1	0	0	1	6

Sheet D	1	2	3	4	5	6	7	8	9	Final
(Scotland) David Murdoch	0	0	0	0	2	0	0	3	0	5
(Newfoundland and Labrador) Brad Gushue 🔨	0	0	2	1	0	2	0	0	2	7

Sheet E	1	2	3	4	5	6	7	8	Final
(Ontario) Brad Jacobs 🔨	0	1	0	0	0	1	1	0	3
(Prince Edward Island) Adam Casey	0	0	0	1	0	0	0	1	2

==== Draw 9 ====
Thursday, December 10, 6:30 pm

Team	1	2	3	4	5	6	7	8	Final
(Saskatchewan) Steve Laycock 🔨	1	0	0	1	0	1	0	0	3
(Manitoba) Reid Carruthers	0	0	2	0	1	0	1	3	7

Team	1	2	3	4	5	6	7	8	Final
(Manitoba) Mike McEwen	0	2	0	0	0	0	0	X	2
(Sweden) Niklas Edin 🔨	1	0	0	2	1	1	2	X	7

Team	1	2	3	4	5	6	7	8	Final
(British Columbia) Jim Cotter 🔨	0	1	0	2	1	0	1	X	5
(Ontario) Glenn Howard	1	0	1	0	0	1	0	X	3

Team	1	2	3	4	5	6	7	8	Final
(Ontario) John Epping 🔨	2	0	5	2	0	X	X	X	9
(Alberta) Kevin Koe	0	1	0	0	2	X	X	X	3

Team	1	2	3	4	5	6	7	8	Final
(Alberta) Brendan Bottcher 🔨	0	2	0	1	5	X	X	X	8
(United States) John Shuster	0	0	1	0	0	X	X	X	1

==== Draw 10 ====
Friday, December 11, 8:00 am

Sheet D	1	2	3	4	5	6	7	8	Final
(Switzerland) Sven Michel 🔨	0	2	0	1	0	0	0	X	3
(Alberta) Pat Simmons	1	0	4	0	0	1	1	X	7

==== Draw 11 ====
Friday, December 11, 11:00 am

Sheet B	1	2	3	4	5	6	7	8	Final
(British Columbia) Jim Cotter	0	0	0	0	0	0	2	X	2
(Manitoba) Mike McEwen 🔨	0	0	2	2	1	0	0	X	5

Sheet E	1	2	3	4	5	6	7	8	Final
(United States) John Shuster	0	2	0	0	1	0	0	0	3
(Prince Edward Island) Adam Casey 🔨	0	0	1	2	0	1	1	2	7

==== Draw 12 ====
Friday, December 11, 2:30 pm

Sheet C	1	2	3	4	5	6	7	8	Final
(Sweden) Niklas Edin 🔨	0	0	2	0	0	2	0	0	4
(Manitoba) Reid Carruthers	1	1	0	0	0	0	2	2	6

Sheet E	1	2	3	4	5	6	7	8	Final
(Alberta) Pat Simmons	0	3	0	1	0	0	0	0	5
(Saskatchewan) Steve Laycock 🔨	2	0	2	0	0	1	0	1	6

==== Draw 13 ====
Friday, December 11, 6:00 pm

Sheet B	1	2	3	4	5	6	7	8	Final
(Alberta) Brendan Bottcher 🔨	0	2	0	1	0	2	0	0	5
(Scotland) David Murdoch	0	0	2	0	2	0	0	2	6

Sheet C	1	2	3	4	5	6	7	8	Final
(Ontario) Brad Jacobs 🔨	1	1	0	1	0	0	0	X	3
(Alberta) Kevin Koe	0	0	2	0	2	1	0	X	5

==== Draw 14 ====
Saturday, December 12, 7:30 am

Sheet B	1	2	3	4	5	6	7	8	Final
(Saskatchewan) Steve Laycock 🔨	2	1	0	3	0	1	X	X	7
(Ontario) Brad Jacobs	0	0	1	0	2	0	X	X	3

Sheet C	1	2	3	4	5	6	7	8	Final
(Manitoba) Mike McEwen	0	2	0	0	1	0	3	0	6
(Alberta) Brendan Bottcher 🔨	1	0	2	1	0	3	0	2	9

Sheet D	1	2	3	4	5	6	7	8	Final
(Prince Edward Island) Adam Casey	0	1	1	0	1	1	0	0	4
(Sweden) Niklas Edin 🔨	2	0	0	2	0	0	2	1	7

=== Playoffs ===
Quarterfinals
A2	(Newfoundland and Labrador) Brad Gushue	6
C2	(Alberta) Brendan Bottcher	2
B3	(Manitoba) Reid Carruthers	6
B1	(Scotland) David Murdoch	3
A1	(Ontario) John Epping	6
C1	(Saskatchewan) Steve Laycock	4
B2	(Alberta) Kevin Koe	7
C3	(Sweden) Niklas Edin	4

Semifinals
A2	(Newfoundland and Labrador) Brad Gushue	5
B3	(Manitoba) Reid Carruthers	2
A1	(Ontario) John Epping	6
B2	(Alberta) Kevin Koe	5

Final
A2	(Newfoundland and Labrador) Brad Gushue	4
A1	(Ontario) John Epping	7

==== Quarterfinals ====
Saturday, December 12, 2:30 pm

Team	1	2	3	4	5	6	7	8	Final
(Newfoundland and Labrador) Brad Gushue 🔨	1	1	1	0	0	1	0	2	6
(Alberta) Brendan Bottcher	0	0	0	1	0	0	1	0	2

Player percentages
(Newfoundland and Labrador) Team Gushue		(Alberta) Team Bottcher	
Geoff Walker	87%	Karrick Martin	82%
Brett Gallant	85%	Brad Thiessen	89%
Mark Nichols	94%	Tom Appelman	95%
Brad Gushue	99%	Brendan Bottcher	74%
Total	91%	Total	85%

Team	1	2	3	4	5	6	7	8	Final
(Manitoba) Reid Carruthers	0	3	0	1	0	0	2	X	6
(Scotland) David Murdoch 🔨	1	0	1	0	0	1	0	X	3

Player percentages
(Manitoba) Team Carruthers		(Scotland) Team Murdoch	
Colin Hodgson	89%	Michael Goodfellow	91%
Derek Samagalski	93%	Scott Andrews	82%
Braeden Moskowy	99%	Greg Drummond	81%
Reid Carruthers	93%	David Murdoch	83%
Total	94%	Total	84%

Team	1	2	3	4	5	6	7	8	Final
(Ontario) John Epping 🔨	0	1	0	3	0	1	0	1	6
(Saskatchewan) Steve Laycock	0	0	2	0	1	0	1	0	4

Player percentages
(Ontario) Team Epping		(Saskatchewan) Team Laycock	
Tim March	80%	Dallan Muyres	97%
Pat Janssen	98%	Colton Flasch	57%
Mat Camm	84%	Kirk Muyres	70%
John Epping	86%	Steve Laycock	82%
Total	87%	Total	77%

Team	1	2	3	4	5	6	7	8	Final
(Alberta) Kevin Koe 🔨	2	0	1	3	0	0	1	X	7
(Sweden) Niklas Edin	0	1	0	0	2	1	0	X	4

Player percentages
(Alberta) Team Koe		(Sweden) Team Edin	
Ben Hebert	95%	Christoffer Sundgren	88%
Brent Laing	83%	Kristian Lindström	80%
Marc Kennedy	87%	Oskar Eriksson	89%
Kevin Koe	90%	Niklas Edin	83%
Total	89%	Total	85%

==== Semifinals ====
Saturday, December 12, 6:30 pm

Team	1	2	3	4	5	6	7	8	Final
(Newfoundland and Labrador) Brad Gushue 🔨	0	0	1	0	3	0	1	X	5
(Manitoba) Reid Carruthers	0	0	0	1	0	1	0	X	2

Player percentages
(Newfoundland and Labrador) Team Gushue		(Manitoba) Team Carruthers	
Geoff Walker	87%	Colin Hodgson	89%
Brett Gallant	85%	Derek Samagalski	66%
Mark Nichols	80%	Braeden Moskowy	81%
Brad Gushue	90%	Reid Carruthers	76%
Total	85%	Total	78%

Team	1	2	3	4	5	6	7	8	Final
(Ontario) John Epping 🔨	2	0	0	1	0	1	0	2	6
(Alberta) Kevin Koe	0	0	2	0	1	0	2	0	5

Player percentages
(Ontario) Team Epping		(Alberta) Team Koe	
Tim March	92%	Ben Hebert	74%
Pat Janssen	93%	Brent Laing	82%
Mat Camm	83%	Marc Kennedy	100%
John Epping	97%	Kevin Koe	98%
Total	91%	Total	89%

==== Final ====
Sunday, December 13, 2:30 pm

Team	1	2	3	4	5	6	7	8	Final
(Newfoundland and Labrador) Brad Gushue 🔨	1	0	1	0	1	0	1	X	4
(Ontario) John Epping	0	2	0	2	0	3	0	X	7

Player percentages
(Newfoundland and Labrador) Team Gushue		(Ontario) Team Epping	
Geoff Walker	85%	Tim March	88%
Brett Gallant	89%	Pat Janssen	79%
Mark Nichols	74%	Mat Camm	81%
Brad Gushue	90%	John Epping	100%
Total	85%	Total	87%

== Women ==
=== Teams ===
Skip	Third	Second	Lead	Locale
Chelsea Carey	Amy Nixon	Jocelyn Peterman	Laine Peters	Calgary, Alberta
Binia Feltscher	Irene Schori	Franziska Kaufmann	Christine Urech	Flims, Switzerland
Tracy Fleury	Crystal Webster	Jenna Walsh	Jenn Horgan	Sudbury, Ontario
Rachel Homan	Emma Miskew	Joanne Courtney	Lisa Weagle	Ottawa, Ontario
Jennifer Jones	Kaitlyn Lawes	Jill Officer	Dawn McEwen	Winnipeg, Manitoba
Kim Eun-jung	Kim Kyeong-ae	Kim Seon-yeong	Kim Yeong-mi	Uiseong, South Korea
Stefanie Lawton	Trish Paulsen	Sherri Singler	Marliese Kasner	Saskatoon, Saskatchewan
Kristy McDonald	Kate Cameron	Leslie Wilson-Westcott	Raunora Westcott	Winnipeg, Manitoba
Sherry Middaugh	Jo-Ann Rizzo	Lee Merklinger	Leigh Armstrong	Coldwater, Ontario
Eve Muirhead	Anna Sloan	Vicki Adams	Sarah Reid	Stirling, Scotland
Alina Pätz	Nadine Lehmann	Marisa Winkelhausen	Nicole Schwägli	Zürich, Switzerland
Kelsey Rocque	Laura Crocker	Taylor McDonald	Jen Gates	Edmonton, Alberta
Anna Sidorova	Margarita Fomina	Alexandra Raeva	Alina Kovaleva	Moscow, Russia
Maria Prytz (Fourth)	Christina Bertrup	Maria Wennerström	Margaretha Sigfridsson (Skip)	Sundsvall, Sweden
Val Sweeting	Lori Olson-Johns	Dana Ferguson	Rachelle Brown	Edmonton, Alberta
Silvana Tirinzoni	Manuela Siegrist	Esther Neuenschwander	Marlene Albrecht	Aarau, Switzerland

=== Knockout Draw Brackets ===
The draw is listed as follows:

==== A event ====
First Knockout				Qualifier 1
(Ontario) Rachel Homan	8
(Saskatchewan) Stefanie Lawton	2	(Ontario) Rachel Homan	6
(Switzerland) Binia Feltscher	9	(Switzerland) Binia Feltscher	1
(Ontario) Sherry Middaugh	4			(Ontario) Rachel Homan	5
(Scotland) Eve Muirhead	5			(Switzerland) Alina Pätz	7
(Alberta) Chelsea Carey	4	(Scotland) Eve Muirhead	3
(Switzerland) Alina Pätz	9	(Switzerland) Alina Pätz	9
(South Korea) Kim Eun-jung	2

First Knockout				Qualifier 2
(Manitoba) Jennifer Jones	8
(Sweden) Margaretha Sigfridsson	4	(Manitoba) Jennifer Jones	6
(Russia) Anna Sidorova	3	(Alberta) Kelsey Rocque	5
(Alberta) Kelsey Rocque	9			(Manitoba) Jennifer Jones	7
(Alberta) Val Sweeting	7			(Alberta) Val Sweeting	5
(Ontario) Tracy Fleury	6	(Alberta) Val Sweeting	8
(Switzerland) Silvana Tirinzoni	9	(Switzerland) Silvana Tirinzoni	3
(Manitoba) Kristy McDonald	3

==== B event ====
Second Knockout				Qualifier 3
(Saskatchewan) Stefanie Lawton	2
(Ontario) Sherry Middaugh	6	(Ontario) Sherry Middaugh	5
(Alberta) Chelsea Carey	9	(Alberta) Chelsea Carey	8
(South Korea) Kim Eun-jung	6			(Alberta) Chelsea Carey	4
				(Alberta) Val Sweeting	5

Second Knockout				Qualifier 4
(Sweden) Margaretha Sigfridsson	3
(Russia) Anna Sidorova	5	(Russia) Anna Sidorova	5
(Ontario) Tracy Fleury	9	(Ontario) Tracy Fleury	6
(Manitoba) Kristy McDonald	4			(Ontario) Tracy Fleury	3
				(Ontario) Rachel Homan	7

Second Knockout		Qualifier 5
(Switzerland) Binia Feltscher	3
(Scotland) Eve Muirhead	10	(Scotland) Eve Muirhead	7
(Alberta) Kelsey Rocque	3	(Switzerland) Silvana Tirinzoni	2
(Switzerland) Silvana Tirinzoni	4

==== C event ====
Third Knockout				Qualifier 6
(Saskatchewan) Stefanie Lawton	8
(South Korea) Kim Eun-jung	3	(Saskatchewan) Stefanie Lawton	2
		(Alberta) Kelsey Rocque	7
				(Alberta) Kelsey Rocque	3
				(Ontario) Tracy Fleury	4

Third Knockout				Qualifier 7
(Sweden) Margaretha Sigfridsson	7
(Manitoba) Kristy McDonald	1	(Sweden) Margaretha Sigfridsson	7
		(Switzerland) Binia Feltscher	6
				(Sweden) Margaretha Sigfridsson	2
				(Alberta) Chelsea Carey	6

Third Knockout		Qualifier 8
(Ontario) Sherry Middaugh	3
(Russia) Anna Sidorova	7	(Russia) Anna Sidorova	6
		(Switzerland) Silvana Tirinzoni	1

=== Knockout results ===
All draw times are listed in Central Time (UTC−06:00).

==== Draw 1 ====
Tuesday, December 8, 7:00 pm

Sheet A	1	2	3	4	5	6	7	8	Final
(Scotland) Eve Muirhead	0	0	2	0	2	1	0	0	5
(Alberta) Chelsea Carey 🔨	1	0	0	2	0	0	1	0	4

Sheet B	1	2	3	4	5	6	7	8	Final
(Switzerland) Alina Pätz 🔨	3	1	0	3	0	2	X	X	9
(South Korea) Kim Eun-jung	0	0	1	0	1	0	X	X	2

==== Draw 2 ====
Wednesday, December 9, 8:00 am

Sheet A	1	2	3	4	5	6	7	8	Final
(Switzerland) Silvana Tirinzoni	0	2	2	0	2	0	3	X	9
(Manitoba) Kristy McDonald 🔨	1	0	0	1	0	1	0	X	3

Sheet B	1	2	3	4	5	6	7	8	Final
(Switzerland) Binia Feltscher 🔨	1	0	5	0	0	3	X	X	9
(Ontario) Sherry Middaugh	0	2	0	1	1	0	X	X	4

Sheet C	1	2	3	4	5	6	7	8	Final
(Ontario) Rachel Homan 🔨	0	1	0	2	4	0	1	X	8
(Saskatchewan) Stefanie Lawton	0	0	1	0	0	1	0	X	2

Sheet D	1	2	3	4	5	6	7	8	Final
(Manitoba) Jennifer Jones 🔨	1	0	3	0	2	0	2	X	8
(Sweden) Margaretha Sigfridsson	0	1	0	1	0	2	0	X	4

Sheet E	1	2	3	4	5	6	7	8	Final
(Russia) Anna Sidorova	0	2	1	0	0	0	0	X	3
(Alberta) Kelsey Rocque 🔨	2	0	0	1	2	1	3	X	9

==== Draw 4 ====
Wednesday, December 9, 2:30 pm

Sheet A	1	2	3	4	5	6	7	8	Final
(Saskatchewan) Stefanie Lawton 🔨	0	0	0	0	2	0	0	0	2
(Ontario) Sherry Middaugh	0	2	0	1	0	1	0	2	6

Sheet B	1	2	3	4	5	6	7	8	9	Final
(Alberta) Val Sweeting	0	1	0	2	1	0	2	0	1	7
(Ontario) Tracy Fleury 🔨	1	0	1	0	0	2	0	2	0	6

Sheet C	1	2	3	4	5	6	7	8	Final
(Scotland) Eve Muirhead	1	0	0	1	0	1	0	X	3
(Switzerland) Alina Pätz 🔨	0	3	2	0	1	0	3	X	9

Sheet D	1	2	3	4	5	6	7	8	Final
(Ontario) Rachel Homan 🔨	2	1	1	2	0	X	X	X	6
(Switzerland) Binia Feltscher	0	0	0	0	1	X	X	X	1

Sheet E	1	2	3	4	5	6	7	8	Final
(Alberta) Chelsea Carey	0	3	0	0	2	0	4	X	9
(South Korea) Kim Eun-jung 🔨	1	0	2	2	0	1	0	X	6

==== Draw 6 ====
Thursday, December 10, 8:00 am

Sheet A	1	2	3	4	5	6	7	8	Final
(Sweden) Margaretha Sigfridsson 🔨	0	1	0	0	1	1	0	0	3
(Russia) Anna Sidorova	0	0	1	2	0	0	1	1	5

Sheet B	1	2	3	4	5	6	7	8	Final
(Ontario) Sherry Middaugh	0	2	0	0	2	0	1	X	5
(Alberta) Chelsea Carey 🔨	2	0	0	2	0	4	0	X	8

Sheet C	1	2	3	4	5	6	7	8	Final
(Manitoba) Jennifer Jones 🔨	2	0	2	0	1	0	0	1	6
(Alberta) Kelsey Rocque	0	2	0	1	0	1	1	0	5

Sheet D	1	2	3	4	5	6	7	8	Final
(Ontario) Tracy Fleury	0	3	0	1	3	0	2	X	9
(Manitoba) Kristy McDonald 🔨	2	0	1	0	0	1	0	X	4

Sheet E	1	2	3	4	5	6	7	8	Final
(Alberta) Val Sweeting	1	1	1	0	2	0	3	X	8
(Switzerland) Silvana Tirinzoni 🔨	0	0	0	1	0	2	0	X	3

==== Draw 8 ====
Thursday, December 10, 2:30 pm

Sheet A	1	2	3	4	5	6	7	8	Final
(Alberta) Kelsey Rocque 🔨	0	1	0	1	0	1	0	0	3
(Switzerland) Silvana Tirinzoni	0	0	0	0	2	0	0	2	4

Sheet B	1	2	3	4	5	6	7	8	Final
(Ontario) Rachel Homan 🔨	0	1	0	0	3	1	0	X	5
(Switzerland) Alina Pätz	0	0	3	1	0	0	3	X	7

Sheet C	1	2	3	4	5	6	7	8	9	Final
(Russia) Anna Sidorova	0	1	0	1	1	0	1	1	0	5
(Ontario) Tracy Fleury 🔨	1	0	2	0	0	2	0	0	1	6

Sheet D	1	2	3	4	5	6	7	8	Final
(Manitoba) Jennifer Jones	1	2	0	2	0	1	0	1	7
(Alberta) Val Sweeting 🔨	0	0	1	0	3	0	1	0	5

Sheet E	1	2	3	4	5	6	7	8	Final
(Switzerland) Binia Feltscher	0	1	0	1	0	1	0	X	3
(Scotland) Eve Muirhead 🔨	1	0	3	0	2	0	4	X	10

==== Draw 10 ====
Friday, December 11, 8:00 am

Sheet B	1	2	3	4	5	6	7	8	Final
(Saskatchewan) Stefanie Lawton 🔨	3	2	0	2	0	1	X	X	8
(South Korea) Kim Eun-jung	0	0	1	0	2	0	X	X	3

Sheet C	1	2	3	4	5	6	7	8	Final
(Sweden) Margaretha Sigfridsson 🔨	1	1	0	0	5	X	X	X	7
(Manitoba) Kristy McDonald	0	0	1	0	0	X	X	X	1

==== Draw 11 ====
Friday, December 11, 11:00 am

Sheet A	1	2	3	4	5	6	7	8	Final
(Alberta) Chelsea Carey 🔨	0	0	0	1	1	0	1	1	4
(Alberta) Val Sweeting	0	0	2	0	0	3	0	0	5

Sheet C	1	2	3	4	5	6	7	8	Final
(Scotland) Eve Muirhead 🔨	0	1	2	0	0	3	1	X	7
(Switzerland) Silvana Tirinzoni	0	0	0	1	1	0	0	X	2

Sheet D	1	2	3	4	5	6	7	8	Final
(Ontario) Tracy Fleury	0	0	1	0	0	2	0	X	3
(Ontario) Rachel Homan 🔨	0	3	0	1	2	0	1	X	7

==== Draw 12 ====
Friday, December 11, 2:30 pm

Sheet A	1	2	3	4	5	6	7	8	Final
(Ontario) Sherry Middaugh	0	2	0	0	1	0	0	X	3
(Russia) Anna Sidorova 🔨	3	0	0	1	0	2	1	X	7

Sheet B	1	2	3	4	5	6	7	8	9	Final
(Sweden) Margaretha Sigfridsson 🔨	2	0	1	0	2	0	1	0	1	7
(Switzerland) Binia Feltscher	0	2	0	1	0	1	0	2	0	6

Sheet D	1	2	3	4	5	6	7	8	Final
(Saskatchewan) Stefanie Lawton	0	1	0	0	1	0	0	X	2
(Alberta) Kelsey Rocque 🔨	2	0	2	1	0	1	1	X	7

==== Draw 13 ====
Friday, December 11, 6:00 pm

Sheet A	1	2	3	4	5	6	7	8	Final
(Alberta) Kelsey Rocque 🔨	1	0	0	0	0	2	0	0	3
(Ontario) Tracy Fleury	0	0	1	1	1	0	0	1	4

Sheet D	1	2	3	4	5	6	7	8	Final
(Sweden) Margaretha Sigfridsson 🔨	1	0	0	1	0	0	0	X	2
(Alberta) Chelsea Carey	0	1	1	0	2	1	1	X	6

Sheet E	1	2	3	4	5	6	7	8	Final
(Russia) Anna Sidorova 🔨	2	0	0	1	1	1	1	X	6
(Switzerland) Silvana Tirinzoni	0	1	0	0	0	0	0	X	1

=== Playoffs ===
Quarterfinals
A2	(Manitoba) Jennifer Jones	6
C1	(Ontario) Tracy Fleury	2
B1	(Alberta) Val Sweeting	5
B3	(Scotland) Eve Muirhead	6
A1	(Switzerland) Alina Pätz	6
C2	(Alberta) Chelsea Carey	8
B2	(Ontario) Rachel Homan	7
C3	(Russia) Anna Sidorova	2

Semifinals
A2	(Manitoba) Jennifer Jones	7
B3	(Scotland) Eve Muirhead	2
C2	(Alberta) Chelsea Carey	0
B2	(Ontario) Rachel Homan	6

Final
A2	(Manitoba) Jennifer Jones	7
B2	(Ontario) Rachel Homan	8

==== Quarterfinals ====
Saturday, December 12, 11:00 am

Team	1	2	3	4	5	6	7	8	Final
(Manitoba) Jennifer Jones 🔨	2	2	0	0	0	2	0	X	6
(Ontario) Tracy Fleury	0	0	1	0	0	0	1	X	2

Player percentages
(Manitoba) Team Jones		(Ontario) Team Fleury	
Dawn McEwen	89%	Jenn Horgan	89%
Jill Officer	92%	Jenna Walsh	76%
Kaitlyn Lawes	88%	Crystal Webster	82%
Jennifer Jones	97%	Tracy Fleury	75%
Total	92%	Total	81%

Team	1	2	3	4	5	6	7	8	Final
(Alberta) Val Sweeting	0	0	0	0	3	0	2	0	5
(Scotland) Eve Muirhead 🔨	1	1	1	1	0	1	0	1	6

Player percentages
(Alberta) Team Sweeting		(Scotland) Team Muirhead	
Rachelle Brown	88%	Sarah Reid	73%
Dana Ferguson	76%	Vicki Adams	70%
Lori Olson-Johns	82%	Anna Sloan	72%
Val Sweeting	61%	Eve Muirhead	69%
Total	77%	Total	71%

Team	1	2	3	4	5	6	7	8	Final
(Switzerland) Alina Pätz 🔨	1	0	0	2	2	0	1	0	6
(Alberta) Chelsea Carey	0	2	2	0	0	3	0	1	8

Player percentages
(Switzerland) Team Pätz		(Alberta) Team Carey	
Nicole Schwägli	70%	Laine Peters	76%
Marisa Winkelhausen	90%	Jocelyn Peterman	85%
Nadine Lehmann	82%	Amy Nixon	77%
Alina Pätz	63%	Chelsea Carey	89%
Total	76%	Total	82%

Team	1	2	3	4	5	6	7	8	Final
(Ontario) Rachel Homan 🔨	0	2	2	0	2	0	1	X	7
(Russia) Anna Sidorova	0	0	0	1	0	1	0	X	2

Player percentages
(Ontario) Team Homan		(Russia) Team Sidorova	
Lisa Weagle	90%	Alina Kovaleva	87%
Joanne Courtney	85%	Alexandra Raeva	78%
Emma Miskew	91%	Margarita Fomina	67%
Rachel Homan	100%	Anna Sidorova	71%
Total	92%	Total	76%

==== Semifinals ====
Saturday, December 12, 6:30 pm

Team	1	2	3	4	5	6	7	8	Final
(Manitoba) Jennifer Jones 🔨	0	1	0	1	1	2	2	X	7
(Scotland) Eve Muirhead	1	0	1	0	0	0	0	X	2

Player percentages
(Manitoba) Team Jones		(Scotland) Team Muirhead	
Dawn McEwen	87%	Sarah Reid	80%
Jill Officer	87%	Vicki Adams	82%
Kaitlyn Lawes	89%	Anna Sloan	78%
Jennifer Jones	86%	Eve Muirhead	72%
Total	87%	Total	78%

Team	1	2	3	4	5	6	7	8	Final
(Alberta) Chelsea Carey	0	0	0	0	0	0	X	X	0
(Ontario) Rachel Homan 🔨	2	1	0	1	1	1	X	X	6

Player percentages
(Alberta) Team Carey		(Ontario) Team Homan	
Laine Peters	84%	Lisa Weagle	90%
Jocelyn Peterman	51%	Joanne Courtney	86%
Amy Nixon	73%	Emma Miskew	78%
Chelsea Carey	65%	Rachel Homan	93%
Total	68%	Total	87%

==== Final ====
Sunday, December 13, 11:00 am

Team	1	2	3	4	5	6	7	8	Final
(Manitoba) Jennifer Jones 🔨	2	0	3	0	0	0	2	0	7
(Ontario) Rachel Homan	0	3	0	1	1	1	0	2	8

Player percentages
(Manitoba) Team Jones		(Ontario) Team Homan	
Dawn McEwen	88%	Lisa Weagle	89%
Jill Officer	54%	Joanne Courtney	78%
Kaitlyn Lawes	73%	Emma Miskew	77%
Jennifer Jones	62%	Rachel Homan	74%
Total	69%	Total	79%
