= 2015 Players' Championship =

Grand Slam of Curling event

- Host city: Toronto, Ontario
- Arena: Mattamy Athletic Centre
- Dates: April 7–12
- Men's winner: (Ontario) Team Jacobs
- Curling club: Soo CA, Sault Ste. Marie, Ontario
- Skip: Brad Jacobs
- Third: Ryan Fry
- Second: E. J. Harnden
- Lead: Ryan Harnden
- Finalist: (Manitoba) Mike McEwen
- Women's winner: (Scotland) Team Muirhead
- Curling club: Dunkeld CC, Pitlochry
- Skip: Eve Muirhead
- Third: Anna Sloan
- Second: Vicki Adams
- Lead: Sarah Reid
- Finalist: (Russia) Anna Sidorova

The 2015 Players' Championship was held from April 7 to 12 at the Mattamy Athletic Centre in Toronto, Ontario. It was the fifth and final Grand Slam of the 2014–15 World Curling Tour.

Sault Ste. Marie's Brad Jacobs rink won their first men's title, while Scotland's Eve Muirhead rink won their second women's title.

== Men ==
=== Teams ===
The teams are listed as follows:

Skip	Third	Second	Lead	Locale
Brendan Bottcher	Tom Appelman	Brad Thiessen	Karrick Martin	Edmonton, Alberta
Reid Carruthers	Braeden Moskowy	Derek Samagalski	Colin Hodgson	West St. Paul, Manitoba
Niklas Edin	Oskar Eriksson	Kristian Lindström	Christoffer Sundgren	Karlstad, Sweden
John Epping	Mat Camm	Patrick Janssen	Tim March	Toronto, Ontario
Brad Gushue	Mark Nichols	Brett Gallant	Geoff Walker	St. John's, Newfoundland and Labrador
Glenn Howard	Richard Hart	Jon Mead	Craig Savill	Penetanguishene, Ontario
Brad Jacobs	Ryan Fry	E. J. Harnden	Ryan Harnden	Sault Ste. Marie, Ontario
Kevin Koe	Marc Kennedy	Brent Laing	Ben Hebert	Calgary, Alberta
Steve Laycock	Kirk Muyres	Colton Flasch	Dallan Muyres	Saskatoon, Saskatchewan
Mike McEwen	B. J. Neufeld	Matt Wozniak	Denni Neufeld	Winnipeg, Manitoba
Sven Michel	Florian Meister	Simon Gempeler	Stefan Meienberg	Adelboden, Switzerland
Jeff Stoughton	Rob Fowler	Alex Forrest	Connor Njegovan	Winnipeg, Manitoba

=== Round-robin standings ===
Final Standings

Key
Teams to Playoffs
Teams to Tiebreaker

Pool A	W	L	PF	PA
(Manitoba) Mike McEwen	5	0	27	14
(Newfoundland and Labrador) Brad Gushue	3	2	20	18
(Alberta) Kevin Koe	3	2	31	20
(Alberta) Brendan Bottcher	3	2	30	22
(Switzerland) Sven Michel	1	4	18	33
(Sweden) Niklas Edin	0	5	20	36

Pool B	W	L	PF	PA
(Ontario) Brad Jacobs	4	1	26	15
(Ontario) John Epping	3	2	24	14
(Ontario) Glenn Howard	3	2	19	23
(Saskatchewan) Steve Laycock	2	3	14	21
(Manitoba) Jeff Stoughton	2	3	16	21
(Manitoba) Reid Carruthers	1	4	18	23

=== Round-robin results ===
==== Draw 1 ====
Tuesday, April 7, 7:00 pm

Sheet C	1	2	3	4	5	6	7	8	Final
(Manitoba) Mike McEwen 🔨	2	0	3	0	0	0	1	1	7
(Switzerland) Sven Michel	0	3	0	2	0	0	0	0	5

Sheet E	1	2	3	4	5	6	7	8	Final
(Alberta) Kevin Koe	0	2	0	2	0	4	X	X	8
(Newfoundland and Labrador) Brad Gushue 🔨	1	0	0	0	1	0	X	X	2

==== Draw 2 ====
Wednesday, April 8, 8:30 am

Sheet C	1	2	3	4	5	6	7	8	Final
(Sweden) Niklas Edin	0	3	0	0	2	0	0	X	5
(Alberta) Brendan Bottcher 🔨	4	0	2	2	0	1	2	X	11

==== Draw 3 ====
Wednesday, April 8, 12:00 pm

Sheet B	1	2	3	4	5	6	7	8	Final
(Manitoba) Jeff Stoughton	0	0	1	0	0	0	X	X	1
(Ontario) Brad Jacobs 🔨	2	2	0	1	1	1	X	X	7

Sheet C	1	2	3	4	5	6	7	8	Final
(Manitoba) Reid Carruthers	0	1	0	0	0	2	0	X	3
(Ontario) John Epping 🔨	2	0	0	2	1	0	2	X	7

Sheet D	1	2	3	4	5	6	7	8	Final
(Ontario) Glenn Howard	0	0	0	2	0	1	0	1	4
(Saskatchewan) Steve Laycock 🔨	0	1	0	0	1	0	1	0	3

==== Draw 4 ====
Wednesday, April 8, 3:30 pm

Sheet A	1	2	3	4	5	6	7	8	Final
(Newfoundland and Labrador) Brad Gushue 🔨	1	0	2	0	1	3	X	X	7
(Switzerland) Sven Michel	0	1	0	1	0	0	X	X	2

Sheet B	1	2	3	4	5	6	7	8	Final
(Alberta) Kevin Koe	0	2	1	3	0	1	0	1	8
(Sweden) Niklas Edin 🔨	3	0	0	0	1	0	1	0	5

Sheet D	1	2	3	4	5	6	7	8	Final
(Manitoba) Mike McEwen 🔨	2	4	0	2	0	X	X	X	8
(Alberta) Brendan Bottcher	0	0	2	0	1	X	X	X	3

==== Draw 5 ====
Wednesday, April 8, 7:30 pm

Sheet A	1	2	3	4	5	6	7	8	Final
(Ontario) Brad Jacobs 🔨	1	0	3	0	0	4	2	X	10
(Ontario) Glenn Howard	0	4	0	0	1	0	0	X	5

Sheet B	1	2	3	4	5	6	7	8	Final
(Manitoba) Reid Carruthers 🔨	0	3	0	1	0	1	0	0	5
(Saskatchewan) Steve Laycock	0	0	1	0	2	0	2	1	6

Sheet D	1	2	3	4	5	6	7	8	Final
(Manitoba) Jeff Stoughton	0	0	1	0	1	0	2	0	4
(Ontario) John Epping 🔨	1	1	0	1	0	1	0	1	5

==== Draw 7 ====
Thursday, April 9, 12:00 pm

Sheet A	1	2	3	4	5	6	7	8	Final
(Manitoba) Mike McEwen 🔨	2	0	0	1	0	2	0	2	7
(Alberta) Kevin Koe	0	1	1	0	1	0	2	0	5

Sheet B	1	2	3	4	5	6	7	8	Final
(Alberta) Brendan Bottcher 🔨	1	0	0	2	0	0	4	X	7
(Switzerland) Sven Michel	0	0	1	0	1	0	0	X	2

Sheet D	1	2	3	4	5	6	7	8	Final
(Newfoundland and Labrador) Brad Gushue	0	1	0	2	0	2	1	X	6
(Sweden) Niklas Edin 🔨	1	0	1	0	2	0	0	X	4

Sheet E	1	2	3	4	5	6	7	8	Final
(Saskatchewan) Steve Laycock	0	0	0	1	0	0	X	X	1
(Ontario) John Epping 🔨	0	1	2	0	3	1	X	X	7

==== Draw 9 ====
Thursday, April 9, 7:30 pm

Sheet A	1	2	3	4	5	6	7	8	9	Final
(Newfoundland and Labrador) Brad Gushue 🔨	0	1	0	2	0	1	0	0	1	5
(Alberta) Brendan Bottcher	0	0	1	0	0	0	2	1	0	4

Sheet B	1	2	3	4	5	6	7	8	Final
(Manitoba) Mike McEwen 🔨	2	0	0	0	0	3	X	X	5
(Sweden) Niklas Edin	0	1	0	0	0	0	X	X	1

Sheet C	1	2	3	4	5	6	7	8	Final
(Ontario) Glenn Howard	0	0	1	0	0	3	0	0	4
(Manitoba) Jeff Stoughton 🔨	2	1	0	0	1	0	0	1	5

Sheet D	1	2	3	4	5	6	7	8	9	Final
(Ontario) Brad Jacobs 🔨	2	0	1	0	0	0	0	1	0	4
(Manitoba) Reid Carruthers	0	1	0	2	0	0	1	0	1	5

Sheet E	1	2	3	4	5	6	7	8	Final
(Alberta) Kevin Koe 🔨	1	0	1	0	1	1	3	X	7
(Switzerland) Sven Michel	0	1	0	2	0	0	0	X	3

==== Draw 11 ====
Friday, April 10, 12:00 pm

Sheet A	1	2	3	4	5	6	7	8	Final
(Manitoba) Jeff Stoughton 🔨	0	1	0	1	2	0	0	2	6
(Manitoba) Reid Carruthers	2	0	2	0	0	1	0	0	5

Sheet B	1	2	3	4	5	6	7	8	Final
(Ontario) Glenn Howard	0	1	0	0	2	0	2	1	6
(Ontario) John Epping 🔨	1	0	0	2	0	2	0	0	5

Sheet C	1	2	3	4	5	6	7	8	9	Final
(Ontario) Brad Jacobs 🔨	0	0	1	1	0	1	1	0	1	5
(Saskatchewan) Steve Laycock	1	1	0	0	0	0	0	2	0	4

Sheet D	1	2	3	4	5	6	7	8	Final
(Alberta) Brendan Bottcher 🔨	0	0	0	2	0	1	1	1	5
(Alberta) Kevin Koe	0	1	0	0	2	0	0	0	3

==== Draw 12 ====
Friday, April 10, 4:00 pm

Sheet E	1	2	3	4	5	6	7	8	Final
(Switzerland) Sven Michel 🔨	2	0	2	1	0	0	0	1	6
(Sweden) Niklas Edin	0	1	0	0	2	1	1	0	5

==== Draw 13 ====
Friday, April 10, 7:30 pm

Sheet B	1	2	3	4	5	6	7	8	Final
(Manitoba) Jeff Stoughton	0	0	1	0	0	1	0	0	2
(Saskatchewan) Steve Laycock 🔨	0	2	0	0	1	0	1	1	5

Sheet C	1	2	3	4	5	6	7	8	Final
(Manitoba) Mike McEwen	2	0	1	0	0	1	0	2	6
(Newfoundland and Labrador) Brad Gushue	0	1	0	1	0	0	2	0	4

Sheet D	1	2	3	4	5	6	7	8	Final
(Ontario) Brad Jacobs	1	0	3	1	0	2	X	X	7
(Ontario) John Epping	0	2	0	0	1	0	X	X	3

Sheet E	1	2	3	4	5	6	7	8	Final
(Ontario) Glenn Howard 🔨	0	2	0	0	2	0	1	0	5
(Manitoba) Reid Carruthers	1	0	0	2	0	0	0	1	4

=== Tiebreaker ===
Saturday, April 20, 8:30 am

Team	1	2	3	4	5	6	7	8	Final
(Ontario) Glenn Howard 🔨	1	0	0	2	0	0	1	0	4
(Alberta) Brendan Bottcher	0	2	1	0	1	1	0	1	6

=== Playoffs ===
Quarterfinals
(Alberta) Kevin Koe	4
(Ontario) John Epping	6
(Newfoundland and Labrador) Brad Gushue	4
(Alberta) Brendan Bottcher	6

Semifinals
(Manitoba) Mike McEwen	7
(Ontario) John Epping	3
(Ontario) Brad Jacobs	6
(Alberta) Brendan Bottcher	5

Final
(Manitoba) Mike McEwen	3
(Ontario) Brad Jacobs	4

==== Quarterfinals ====
Saturday, April 11, 3:30 pm

Team	1	2	3	4	5	6	7	8	Final
(Alberta) Kevin Koe	0	0	1	0	0	2	0	1	4
(Ontario) John Epping	0	2	0	1	2	0	1	0	6

Team	1	2	3	4	5	6	7	8	Final
(Newfoundland and Labrador) Brad Gushue	0	2	0	1	0	1	0	X	4
(Alberta) Brendan Bottcher	2	0	1	0	1	0	2	X	6

==== Semifinals ====
Sunday, April 12, 10:00 am

Team	1	2	3	4	5	6	7	8	Final
(Manitoba) Mike McEwen 🔨	0	2	0	2	2	0	1	X	7
(Ontario) John Epping	0	0	2	0	0	1	0	X	3

Team	1	2	3	4	5	6	7	8	Final
(Ontario) Brad Jacobs 🔨	0	2	0	0	1	0	0	3	6
(Alberta) Brendan Bottcher	0	0	2	1	0	2	0	0	5

==== Final ====
Sunday, April 12, 7:00 pm

Team	1	2	3	4	5	6	7	8	Final
(Manitoba) Mike McEwen 🔨	1	0	0	2	0	0	0	0	3
(Ontario) Brad Jacobs	0	1	0	0	2	0	0	1	4

== Women ==
=== Teams ===
The teams are listed as follows:

Skip	Third	Second	Lead	Locale
Binia Feltscher	Irene Schori	Franziska Kaufmann	Christine Urech	Flims, Switzerland
Rachel Homan	Emma Miskew	Joanne Courtney	Lisa Weagle	Ottawa, Ontario
Jennifer Jones	Kaitlyn Lawes	Jill Officer	Dawn McEwen	Winnipeg, Manitoba
Kristy McDonald	Kate Cameron	Lisa Blixhavn	Raunora Westcott	Winnipeg, Manitoba
Sherry Middaugh	Jo-Ann Rizzo	Lee Merklinger	Leigh Armstrong	Coldwater, Ontario
Eve Muirhead	Anna Sloan	Vicki Adams	Sarah Reid	Pitlochry, Scotland
Heather Nedohin	Amy Nixon	Jocelyn Peterman	Laine Peters	Edmonton, Alberta
Alina Pätz	Nadine Lehmann	Marisa Winkelhausen	Nicole Schwägli	Baden, Switzerland
Anna Sidorova	Margarita Fomina	Aleksandra Saitova	Ekaterina Galkina	Moscow, Russia
Maria Prytz (fourth)	Christina Bertrup	Alison Kreviazuk	Margaretha Sigfridsson (skip)	Skellefteå, Sweden
Valerie Sweeting	Lori Olson-Johns	Dana Ferguson	Rachelle Brown	Edmonton, Alberta
Silvana Tirinzoni	Manuela Siegrist	Esther Neuenschwander	Marlene Albrecht	Aarau, Switzerland

=== Round-robin standings ===
Final round-robin standings

Key
Teams to Playoffs
Teams to Tiebreaker

Pool A	W	L	PF	PA
(Switzerland) Alina Pätz	4	1	37	25
(Alberta) Heather Nedohin	3	2	28	28
(Scotland) Eve Muirhead	3	2	35	22
(Russia) Anna Sidorova	3	2	29	28
(Manitoba) Jennifer Jones	1	4	22	35
(Switzerland) Binia Feltscher	1	4	24	37

Pool B	W	L	PF	PA
(Alberta) Valerie Sweeting	4	1	31	22
(Ontario) Rachel Homan	4	1	35	25
(Ontario) Sherry Middaugh	3	2	30	29
(Switzerland) Silvana Tirinzoni	2	3	29	31
(Manitoba) Kristy McDonald	2	3	23	28
(Sweden) Margaretha Sigfridsson	0	5	21	34

=== Round-robin results ===
==== Draw 1 ====
Tuesday, April 7, 7:00 pm

Sheet A	1	2	3	4	5	6	7	8	Final
(Ontario) Rachel Homan 🔨	1	0	2	2	2	0	3	X	10
(Sweden) Margaretha Sigfridsson	0	2	0	0	0	1	0	X	3

Sheet B	1	2	3	4	5	6	7	8	Final
(Alberta) Valerie Sweeting 🔨	1	0	0	2	0	0	1	0	4
(Ontario) Sherry Middaugh	0	2	1	0	0	1	0	1	5

Sheet D	1	2	3	4	5	6	7	8	Final
(Switzerland) Silvana Tirinzoni	0	0	3	0	1	1	4	X	9
(Manitoba) Kristy McDonald 🔨	0	4	0	1	0	0	0	X	5

==== Draw 2 ====
Wednesday, April 8, 8:30 am

Sheet A	1	2	3	4	5	6	7	8	Final
(Switzerland) Alina Pätz	1	1	0	1	1	0	2	2	8
(Scotland) Eve Muirhead 🔨	0	0	1	0	0	3	0	0	4

Sheet B	1	2	3	4	5	6	7	8	Final
(Russia) Anna Sidorova	0	2	0	0	1	0	0	X	3
(Switzerland) Binia Feltscher 🔨	2	0	1	2	0	2	1	X	8

Sheet D	1	2	3	4	5	6	7	8	Final
(Alberta) Heather Nedohin	0	0	1	0	1	0	2	1	5
(Manitoba) Jennifer Jones 🔨	0	1	0	0	0	1	0	0	2

==== Draw 3 ====
Wednesday, April 8, 12:00 pm

Sheet A	1	2	3	4	5	6	7	8	Final
(Ontario) Sherry Middaugh 🔨	2	0	1	0	1	0	1	0	5
(Manitoba) Kristy McDonald	0	2	0	1	0	1	0	2	6

Sheet E	1	2	3	4	5	6	7	8	9	Final
(Sweden) Margaretha Sigfridsson	0	1	1	1	1	1	0	1	0	6
(Alberta) Valerie Sweeting 🔨	3	0	0	0	0	0	3	0	1	7

==== Draw 4 ====
Wednesday, April 8, 3:30 pm

Sheet C	1	2	3	4	5	6	7	8	Final
(Ontario) Rachel Homan	1	2	0	4	0	2	X	X	9
(Switzerland) Silvana Tirinzoni 🔨	0	0	1	0	3	0	X	X	4

Sheet E	1	2	3	4	5	6	7	8	Final
(Alberta) Heather Nedohin 🔨	1	0	0	1	0	1	1	X	4
(Russia) Anna Sidorova	0	2	2	0	3	0	0	X	7

==== Draw 5 ====
Wednesday, April 8, 7:30 pm

Sheet C	1	2	3	4	5	6	7	8	Final
(Switzerland) Alina Pätz 🔨	3	1	0	2	0	1	2	X	9
(Switzerland) Binia Feltscher	0	0	2	0	1	0	0	X	3

Sheet E	1	2	3	4	5	6	7	8	Final
(Manitoba) Jennifer Jones	1	0	0	0	1	0	X	X	2
(Scotland) Eve Muirhead	0	1	3	2	0	3	X	X	9

==== Draw 6 ====
Thursday, April 9, 8:30 am

Sheet B	1	2	3	4	5	6	7	8	Final
(Ontario) Rachel Homan 🔨	3	0	2	0	0	0	0	X	5
(Manitoba) Kristy McDonald	0	1	0	1	1	0	0	X	3

Sheet C	1	2	3	4	5	6	7	8	Final
(Ontario) Sherry Middaugh 🔨	2	0	0	1	3	0	1	X	7
(Sweden) Margaretha Sigfridsson	0	1	0	0	0	3	0	X	4

Sheet D	1	2	3	4	5	6	7	8	9	Final
(Switzerland) Silvana Tirinzoni	0	1	0	1	0	1	0	2	0	5
(Alberta) Valerie Sweeting 🔨	0	0	1	0	1	0	3	0	1	6

==== Draw 7 ====
Thursday, April 9, 12:00 pm

Sheet C	1	2	3	4	5	6	7	8	Final
(Alberta) Heather Nedohin	0	0	0	2	0	1	0	X	3
(Scotland) Eve Muirhead 🔨	1	1	1	0	3	0	2	X	8

==== Draw 8 ====
Thursday, April 9, 3:30 pm

Sheet A	1	2	3	4	5	6	7	8	Final
(Manitoba) Kristy McDonald	0	1	0	1	0	2	0	1	5
(Sweden) Margaretha Sigfridsson 🔨	2	0	1	0	1	0	0	0	4

Sheet B	1	2	3	4	5	6	7	8	Final
(Switzerland) Silvana Tirinzoni	0	0	3	0	2	0	1	0	6
(Ontario) Sherry Middaugh 🔨	0	1	0	1	0	2	0	3	7

Sheet C	1	2	3	4	5	6	7	8	Final
(Ontario) Rachel Homan	0	1	0	1	0	X	X	X	2
(Alberta) Valerie Sweeting 🔨	2	0	4	0	3	X	X	X	9

Sheet D	1	2	3	4	5	6	7	8	9	Final
(Switzerland) Alina Pätz	0	2	0	1	0	2	0	0	1	6
(Russia) Anna Sidorova 🔨	1	0	2	0	1	0	0	1	0	5

Sheet E	1	2	3	4	5	6	7	8	9	Final
(Manitoba) Jennifer Jones	0	1	1	0	1	0	1	1	1	6
(Switzerland) Binia Feltscher 🔨	1	0	0	2	0	2	0	0	0	5

==== Draw 10 ====
Friday, April 10, 8:30 am

Sheet A	1	2	3	4	5	6	7	8	9	Final
(Manitoba) Jennifer Jones 🔨	2	0	1	0	2	0	2	0	0	7
(Russia) Anna Sidorova	0	2	0	3	0	1	0	1	1	8

Sheet B	1	2	3	4	5	6	7	8	9	Final
(Switzerland) Alina Pätz	0	0	2	0	2	0	0	2	0	6
(Alberta) Heather Nedohin 🔨	1	2	0	1	0	0	2	0	2	8

Sheet D	1	2	3	4	5	6	7	8	Final
(Scotland) Eve Muirhead 🔨	1	0	4	0	1	5	X	X	11
(Switzerland) Binia Feltscher	0	1	0	2	0	0	X	X	3

Sheet E	1	2	3	4	5	6	7	8	9	Final
(Alberta) Valerie Sweeting	0	0	1	0	1	0	0	2	1	5
(Manitoba) Kristy McDonald 🔨	0	1	0	1	0	1	1	0	0	4

==== Draw 11 ====
Friday, April 10, 12:00 pm

Sheet E	1	2	3	4	5	6	7	8	Final
(Sweden) Margaretha Sigfridsson 🔨	1	0	2	0	1	0	0	0	4
(Switzerland) Silvana Tirinzoni	0	1	0	1	0	1	1	1	5

==== Draw 12 ====
Friday, April 10, 4:00 pm

Sheet A	1	2	3	4	5	6	7	8	Final
(Alberta) Heather Nedohin 🔨	0	3	0	2	2	0	1	X	8
(Switzerland) Binia Feltscher	1	0	2	0	0	2	0	X	5

Sheet B	1	2	3	4	5	6	7	8	Final
(Russia) Anna Sidorova	3	0	0	1	1	0	1	X	6
(Scotland) Eve Muirhead 🔨	0	1	0	0	0	2	0	X	3

Sheet C	1	2	3	4	5	6	7	8	Final
(Manitoba) Jennifer Jones	0	1	0	3	0	1	0	X	5
(Switzerland) Alina Pätz 🔨	1	0	2	0	3	0	2	X	8

Sheet D	1	2	3	4	5	6	7	8	9	Final
(Ontario) Rachel Homan	0	2	0	1	1	0	2	0	3	9
(Ontario) Sherry Middaugh 🔨	1	0	2	0	0	1	0	2	0	6

=== Tiebreaker ===
Saturday, April 11, 8:30 am

Team	1	2	3	4	5	6	7	8	Final
(Russia) Anna Sidorova 🔨	1	0	2	0	0	3	0	1	7
(Ontario) Sherry Middaugh	0	1	0	3	0	0	1	0	5

=== Playoffs ===
Quarterfinals
(Alberta) Heather Nedohin	4
(Scotland) Eve Muirhead	7
(Switzerland) Alina Pätz	3
(Russia) Anna Sidorova	6

Semifinals
(Ontario) Rachel Homan	7
(Scotland) Eve Muirhead	8
(Alberta) Valerie Sweeting	3
(Russia) Anna Sidorova	5

Final
(Scotland) Eve Muirhead	4
(Russia) Anna Sidorova	2

==== Quarterfinals ====
Saturday, April 11, 12:00 pm

Team	1	2	3	4	5	6	7	8	Final
(Alberta) Heather Nedohin	0	1	0	0	2	0	1	0	4
(Scotland) Eve Muirhead 🔨	2	0	2	0	0	1	0	2	7

Team	1	2	3	4	5	6	7	8	Final
(Switzerland) Alina Pätz 🔨	1	0	1	0	1	0	0	X	3
(Russia) Anna Sidorova	0	2	0	1	0	2	1	X	6

==== Semifinals ====
Sunday, April 12, 10:00 am

Team	1	2	3	4	5	6	7	8	Final
(Ontario) Rachel Homan 🔨	0	0	1	0	2	0	2	2	7
(Scotland) Eve Muirhead	0	2	0	2	0	4	0	0	8

Team	1	2	3	4	5	6	7	8	Final
(Alberta) Valerie Sweeting 🔨	1	0	0	2	0	0	0	X	3
(Russia) Anna Sidorova	0	0	0	0	2	2	1	X	5

==== Final ====
Sunday, April 12, 2:00 pm

Team	1	2	3	4	5	6	7	8	Final
(Scotland) Eve Muirhead	0	0	1	0	1	0	1	1	4
(Russia) Anna Sidorova 🔨	0	1	0	1	0	0	0	0	2
