= 2020 Schweizer Cup =

- Host city: Baden, Switzerland
- Dates: August 20–23
- Men's winner: (Canton of Schaffhausen) Team Schnider
- Curling club: Vereinigung Schaffhauser Curling-Clubs, Schaffhausen
- Skip: Andrin Schnider
- Third: Oliver Widmer
- Second: Nicola Stoll
- Lead: Fabian Schmid
- Alternate: Tom Winklehausen
- Coach: Peter Hartmann
- Finalist: (Canton of Bern) Yannick Schwaller
- Women's winner: (Valais) Team Stern
- Curling club: CC Oberwallis, Brig-Glis
- Skip: Elena Stern
- Fourth: Briar Hürlimann
- Second: Lisa Gisler
- Lead: Céline Koller
- Finalist: (Aargau) Silvana Tirinzoni

The 2020 Schweizer Cup (French: Cup Suisse) in curling was held from August 20 to 23 in Baden, Switzerland. The total purse for the event was 11,000 Swiss francs on both the men's and women's sides.

Similar to the Canada Cup held in Canada, the Schweizer Cup is an annual event where the top teams in Switzerland compete in a round robin and playoff round. Team Peter de Cruz from Geneva opted out of the tournament as they prepared for the Baden Masters the following week.

In the men's event, Andrin Schnider and his team from Schaffhausen took the title in a draw to the button against Yannick Schwaller of Bern. In the bronze medal game, Jan Hess came from behind, scoring four points in the seventh end and stealing one in the eighth to defeat Jan Klossner.

On the women's side of the draw, Elena Stern from Brig-Glis came back from a 4–1 deficit at the half way point to defeat Aarau's Silvana Tirinzoni. Stern also upended Tirinzoni in the final of the 2020 Swiss Women's Curling Championship earlier in the year. Team Irene Schori claimed the bronze medal with a 9–6 win over Raphaela Keiser.

== Men ==
=== Teams ===
The teams are listed as follows:

Skip	Third	Second	Lead	Alternate	Locale
Christian Bangerter	Kim-Lloyd Sciboz	Daniel Inversini	Antoine Liaudet		(Canton of Bern) Bern
Christian Heinimann	Felix Eberhard	Linus Imfeld	Lorenz Krammer		(Basel-Landschaft) Basel
Jan Hess	Simon Gloor	Simon Höhn	Reto Schönenberger		(Canton of Zug) Zug
Marco Hösli	Philipp Hösli	Marco Hefti	Justin Hausherr		(Canton of Glarus) Glarus
Dean Hürlimann	Matthieu Fague	Nicolas Romang	Jan Tanner		(Canton of Zug) Zug
Jan Iseli	Max Winz	Nathan Weber	Ilian Meier	Sandro Fanchini	(Canton of Solothurn) Solothurn / (Canton of Bern) Biel/Bienne
Rolf Iseli	Jonas Weiss	Yves Gigandet	Marcel Wettstein		(Aargau) Aarau
Anthony Petoud (Fourth)	Jan Klossner (Skip)	Pablo Lachat	Theo Kurz	Noé Traub	(Vaud) Lausanne / (Basel-Landschaft) Basel
Andrin Schnider	Oliver Widmer	Nicola Stoll	Fabian Schmid	Tom Winkelhausen	(Canton of Schaffhausen) Schaffhausen
Yannick Schwaller	Michael Brunner	Romano Meier	Marcel Käufeler		(Canton of Bern) Bern

=== Round-robin standings ===
Final round-robin standings

Key
Teams to Playoffs

Pool A	W	L	DSW	DSL	Pts	PF	PA	EW	EL	BE	SE	DSC
(Canton of Bern) Yannick Schwaller	4	0	0	0	12	37	12	15	11	2	5	22.13
(Vaud) (Basel-Landschaft) Jan Klossner	3	1	0	0	9	29	13	16	7	3	7	49.70
(Basel-Landschaft) Christian Heinimann	1	3	0	0	3	15	36	7	19	0	1	39.25
(Canton of Zug) Dean Hürlimann	1	3	0	0	3	15	34	10	15	0	2	67.18
(Canton of Glarus) Marco Hösli	1	3	0	0	3	23	24	15	11	1	8	104.93

Pool B	W	L	DSW	DSL	Pts	PF	PA	EW	EL	BE	SE	DSC
(Canton of Schaffhausen) Andrin Schnider	4	0	0	0	12	28	16	16	10	2	3	25.05
(Canton of Zug) Jan Hess	3	1	0	0	9	32	19	15	11	1	6	54.35
(Aargau) Rolf Iseli	1	2	1	0	5	21	29	14	14	1	4	124.93
(Canton of Solothurn) (Canton of Bern) Jan Iseli	1	3	0	0	3	22	28	11	17	1	4	68.23
(Canton of Bern) Christian Bangerter	0	3	0	1	1	16	27	11	15	2	1	49.23

=== Round-robin results ===
All draw times are listed in Central European Time (UTC+02:00).

==== Draw 1 ====
Thursday, August 20, 6:00 pm

Sheet 1	1	2	3	4	5	6	7	8	Final
(Canton of Zug) Jan Hess	0	2	0	0	2	0	2	0	6
(Canton of Schaffhausen) Andrin Schnider	2	0	2	0	0	1	0	2	7

Sheet 2	1	2	3	4	5	6	7	8	Final
(Canton of Glarus) Marco Hösli	2	0	1	0	3	1	0	0	7
(Basel-Landschaft) Christian Heinimann	0	2	0	2	0	0	2	4	10

Sheet 3	1	2	3	4	5	6	7	8	Final
(Canton of Bern) Christian Bangerter	2	0	0	0	3	0	1	X	6
(Canton of Solothurn) (Canton of Bern) Jan Iseli	0	3	2	1	0	3	0	X	9

Sheet 4	1	2	3	4	5	6	7	8	Final
(Canton of Bern) Yannick Schwaller	2	0	1	0	0	5	0	X	8
(Vaud) (Basel-Landschaft) Jan Klossner	0	2	0	0	1	0	1	X	4

==== Draw 2 ====
Friday, August 21, 1:00 pm

Sheet 1	1	2	3	4	5	6	7	8	Final
(Canton of Bern) Yannick Schwaller	0	2	0	2	0	0	0	3	7
(Canton of Glarus) Marco Hösli	1	0	1	0	2	1	0	0	5

Sheet 2	1	2	3	4	5	6	7	8	Final
(Vaud) (Basel-Landschaft) Jan Klossner	1	0	1	4	0	3	X	X	9
(Canton of Zug) Dean Hürlimann	0	1	0	0	1	0	X	X	2

Sheet 3	1	2	3	4	5	6	7	8	Final
(Canton of Schaffhausen) Andrin Schnider	1	0	2	1	0	5	X	X	9
(Aargau) Rolf Iseli	0	1	0	0	1	0	X	X	2

Sheet 4	1	2	3	4	5	6	7	8	Final
(Canton of Zug) Jan Hess	1	0	1	2	0	3	0	X	7
(Canton of Bern) Christian Bangerter	0	0	0	0	2	0	1	X	3

==== Draw 3 ====
Friday, August 21, 7:00 pm

Sheet 1	1	2	3	4	5	6	7	8	Final
(Canton of Solothurn) (Canton of Bern) Jan Iseli	0	2	1	0	3	0	0	0	6
(Aargau) Rolf Iseli	1	0	0	2	0	2	1	1	7

Sheet 2	1	2	3	4	5	6	7	8	Final
(Canton of Bern) Christian Bangerter	0	0	2	0	0	1	0	X	3
(Canton of Schaffhausen) Andrin Schnider	0	1	0	1	2	0	2	X	6

Sheet 3	1	2	3	4	5	6	7	8	Final
(Canton of Glarus) Marco Hösli	0	1	0	0	2	0	0	0	3
(Vaud) (Basel-Landschaft) Jan Klossner	2	0	0	0	0	3	0	1	6

Sheet 4	1	2	3	4	5	6	7	8	Final
(Basel-Landschaft) Christian Heinimann	0	0	1	0	0	3	0	X	4
(Canton of Zug) Dean Hürlimann	1	2	0	3	1	0	3	X	10

==== Draw 4 ====
Saturday, August 22, 1:00 pm

Sheet 1	1	2	3	4	5	6	7	8	Final
(Canton of Zug) Dean Hürlimann	0	0	0	1	0	0	X	X	1
(Canton of Glarus) Marco Hösli	1	1	1	0	4	1	X	X	8

Sheet 2	1	2	3	4	5	6	7	8	Final
(Basel-Landschaft) Christian Heinimann	0	0	0	1	0	0	X	X	1
(Canton of Bern) Yannick Schwaller	0	4	3	0	1	1	X	X	9

Sheet 3	1	2	3	4	5	6	7	8	9	Final
(Aargau) Rolf Iseli	0	0	3	0	0	0	1	0	1	5
(Canton of Bern) Christian Bangerter	0	1	0	1	0	1	0	1	0	4

Sheet 4	1	2	3	4	5	6	7	8	Final
(Canton of Solothurn) (Canton of Bern) Jan Iseli	0	0	0	0	0	2	0	X	2
(Canton of Zug) Jan Hess	2	2	0	1	1	0	3	X	9

==== Draw 5 ====
Saturday, August 22, 7:00 pm

Sheet 1	1	2	3	4	5	6	7	8	Final
(Vaud) (Basel-Landschaft) Jan Klossner	1	2	3	1	2	1	X	X	10
(Basel-Landschaft) Christian Heinimann	0	0	0	0	0	0	X	X	0

Sheet 2	1	2	3	4	5	6	7	8	Final
(Aargau) Rolf Iseli	1	0	3	1	0	2	0	X	7
(Canton of Zug) Jan Hess	0	3	0	0	4	0	3	X	10

Sheet 3	1	2	3	4	5	6	7	8	Final
(Canton of Zug) Dean Hürlimann	0	0	0	1	0	1	X	X	2
(Canton of Bern) Yannick Schwaller	3	5	4	0	1	0	X	X	13

Sheet 4	1	2	3	4	5	6	7	8	Final
(Canton of Schaffhausen) Andrin Schnider	0	0	2	1	0	2	0	1	6
(Canton of Solothurn) (Canton of Bern) Jan Iseli	2	0	0	0	1	0	2	0	5

=== Playoffs ===
Semifinals
A1	(Canton of Bern) Yannick Schwaller	9
B2	(Canton of Zug) Jan Hess	3
B1	(Canton of Schaffhausen) Andrin Schnider	6
A2	(Vaud) (Basel-Landschaft) Jan Klossner	3

Final
A1	(Canton of Bern) Yannick Schwaller	6
B1	(Canton of Schaffhausen) Andrin Schnider	7

Bronze Medal Game
B2	(Canton of Zug) Jan Hess	7
A2	(Vaud) (Basel-Landschaft) Jan Klossner	6

==== Semifinals ====
Sunday, August 23, 12:00 pm

Sheet 2	1	2	3	4	5	6	7	8	Final
(Canton of Bern) Yannick Schwaller	0	3	0	0	5	1	X	X	9
(Canton of Zug) Jan Hess	1	0	0	2	0	0	X	X	3

Sheet 4	1	2	3	4	5	6	7	8	Final
(Canton of Schaffhausen) Andrin Schnider	0	0	1	0	2	0	3	X	6
(Vaud) (Basel-Landschaft) Jan Klossner	0	0	0	1	0	2	0	X	3

==== Bronze medal game ====
Sunday, August 23, 3:30 pm

Sheet 1	1	2	3	4	5	6	7	8	Final
(Canton of Zug) Jan Hess	0	1	0	0	1	0	4	1	7
(Vaud) (Basel-Landschaft) Jan Klossner	2	0	0	2	0	2	0	0	6

==== Final ====
Sunday, August 23, 3:30 pm

Sheet 3	1	2	3	4	5	6	7	8	9	Final
(Canton of Bern) Yannick Schwaller	1	3	0	1	0	0	1	0	0	6
(Canton of Schaffhausen) Andrin Schnider	0	0	2	0	1	2	0	1	1	7

== Women ==
=== Teams ===
The teams are listed as follows:

Skip	Third	Second	Lead	Alternate	Locale
Selina Witschonke (Fourth)	Elena Mathis	Raphaela Keiser (Skip)	Marina Lörtscher		(Grisons) St. Moritz
Sarah Müller	Malin Da Ros	Marion Wüest	Eveline Matti	Selina Gafner	(Canton of Bern) Biel/Bienne / (Canton of St. Gallen) St. Gallen
Irene Schori	Carole Howald	Lara Stocker	Stefanie Berset		(Canton of Bern) Langenthal
Celine Schwizgebel	Ophélie Gauchat	Marina Hauser	Joëlle Fuss	Emma Suter	(Canton of Bern) Gstaad / Thun
Briar Hürlimann (Fourth)	Elena Stern (Skip)	Lisa Gisler	Céline Koller		(Valais) Brig-Glis
Alina Pätz (Fourth)	Silvana Tirinzoni (Skip)	Esther Neuenschwander	Melanie Barbezat	Marlene Albrecht	(Aargau) Aarau
Ladina Müller (Fourth)	Nora Wüest (Skip)	Anna Stern	Karin Winter	Lisa Gugler	(Canton of Zurich) Wetzikon

=== Round-robin standings ===
Final round-robin standings

Key
Teams to Final
Teams to Bronze Medal Game

Skip	W	L	DSW	DSL	Pts	PF	PA	EW	EL	BE	SE	DSC
(Aargau) Silvana Tirinzoni	5	1	0	0	15	48	23	23	16	1	9	30.00
(Valais) Elena Stern	4	1	1	0	14	38	27	26	18	3	8	21.84
(Canton of Bern) Irene Schori	4	2	0	0	12	36	20	25	12	2	13	26.18
(Grisons) Raphaela Keiser	3	2	0	1	10	32	31	19	23	4	5	33.08
(Canton of Zurich) Nora Wüest	3	3	0	0	9	35	39	20	23	1	6	102.64
(Canton of Bern) (Canton of St. Gallen) Sarah Müller	1	5	0	0	3	21	45	14	25	2	4	34.10
(Canton of Bern) Celine Schwizgebel	0	6	0	0	0	20	45	15	25	1	2	92.28

=== Round-robin results ===
All draw times are listed in Central European Time (UTC+02:00).

==== Draw 1 ====
Thursday, August 20, 3:00 pm

Sheet 1	1	2	3	4	5	6	7	8	Final
(Canton of Bern) Celine Schwizgebel	0	0	0	0	0	1	X	X	1
(Canton of Bern) Irene Schori	1	2	2	2	2	0	X	X	9

Sheet 2	1	2	3	4	5	6	7	8	9	Final
(Grisons) Raphaela Keiser	1	0	2	0	2	0	2	0	0	7
(Valais) Elena Stern	0	0	0	1	0	3	0	3	1	8

Sheet 3	1	2	3	4	5	6	7	8	Final
(Canton of Bern) (Canton of St. Gallen) Sarah Müller	1	0	0	2	2	0	1	0	6
(Canton of Zurich) Nora Wüest	0	2	1	0	0	2	0	3	8

==== Draw 2 ====
Thursday, August 20, 9:00 pm

Sheet 1	1	2	3	4	5	6	7	8	Final
(Canton of Zurich) Nora Wüest	3	0	0	3	0	2	0	0	8
(Valais) Elena Stern	0	2	1	0	1	0	2	1	7

Sheet 3	1	2	3	4	5	6	7	8	Final
(Aargau) Silvana Tirinzoni	1	0	0	2	2	1	0	1	7
(Grisons) Raphaela Keiser	0	0	1	0	0	0	4	0	5

Sheet 4	1	2	3	4	5	6	7	8	Final
(Canton of Bern) Irene Schori	0	0	2	0	2	1	2	X	7
(Canton of Bern) (Canton of St. Gallen) Sarah Müller	0	0	0	1	0	0	0	X	1

==== Draw 3 ====
Friday, August 21, 10:00 am

Sheet 1	1	2	3	4	5	6	7	8	Final
(Grisons) Raphaela Keiser	1	0	0	2	0	1	0	2	6
(Canton of Bern) (Canton of St. Gallen) Sarah Müller	0	2	1	0	0	0	2	0	5

Sheet 2	1	2	3	4	5	6	7	8	Final
(Aargau) Silvana Tirinzoni	3	0	0	0	2	0	2	X	7
(Canton of Bern) Irene Schori	0	1	0	2	0	1	0	X	4

Sheet 3	1	2	3	4	5	6	7	8	Final
(Canton of Bern) Celine Schwizgebel	0	0	2	0	2	0	0	X	4
(Canton of Zurich) Nora Wüest	3	2	0	2	0	2	1	X	10

==== Draw 4 ====
Friday, August 21, 5:00 pm

Sheet 1	1	2	3	4	5	6	7	8	Final
(Aargau) Silvana Tirinzoni	4	2	0	2	0	2	X	X	10
(Canton of Bern) Celine Schwizgebel	0	0	2	0	1	0	X	X	3

Sheet 2	1	2	3	4	5	6	7	8	Final
(Valais) Elena Stern	1	1	0	1	0	2	2	X	7
(Canton of Bern) (Canton of St. Gallen) Sarah Müller	0	0	1	0	1	0	0	X	2

Sheet 4	1	2	3	4	5	6	7	8	Final
(Canton of Zurich) Nora Wüest	0	2	0	0	1	0	0	X	3
(Canton of Bern) Irene Schori	2	0	2	1	0	1	2	X	8

==== Draw 5 ====
Saturday, August 22, 10:00 am

Sheet 1	1	2	3	4	5	6	7	8	Final
(Canton of Bern) Irene Schori	0	1	0	1	0	1	0	1	4
(Grisons) Raphaela Keiser	1	0	0	0	0	0	2	0	3

Sheet 3	1	2	3	4	5	6	7	8	Final
(Valais) Elena Stern	1	0	1	1	0	1	0	X	4
(Canton of Bern) Celine Schwizgebel	0	1	0	0	1	0	1	X	3

Sheet 4	1	2	3	4	5	6	7	8	Final
(Canton of Bern) (Canton of St. Gallen) Sarah Müller	0	0	0	0	1	0	X	X	1
(Aargau) Silvana Tirinzoni	4	3	1	3	0	1	X	X	12

==== Draw 6 ====
Saturday, August 22, 5:00 pm

Sheet 2	1	2	3	4	5	6	7	8	Final
(Canton of Zurich) Nora Wüest	0	0	1	1	0	1	0	X	3
(Aargau) Silvana Tirinzoni	3	1	0	0	2	0	3	X	9

Sheet 3	1	2	3	4	5	6	7	8	Final
(Canton of Bern) Irene Schori	0	0	1	1	0	1	1	0	4
(Valais) Elena Stern	0	2	0	0	1	0	0	2	5

Sheet 4	1	2	3	4	5	6	7	8	Final
(Canton of Bern) Celine Schwizgebel	1	1	0	0	1	0	1	0	4
(Grisons) Raphaela Keiser	0	0	1	1	0	3	0	1	6

==== Draw 7 ====
Sunday, August 23, 9:00 am

Sheet 1	1	2	3	4	5	6	7	8	Final
(Valais) Elena Stern	0	1	2	0	1	0	1	2	7
(Aargau) Silvana Tirinzoni	0	0	0	2	0	1	0	0	3

Sheet 2	1	2	3	4	5	6	7	8	Final
(Canton of Bern) (Canton of St. Gallen) Sarah Müller	0	2	1	0	0	3	0	0	6
(Canton of Bern) Celine Schwizgebel	0	0	0	2	0	0	2	1	5

Sheet 4	1	2	3	4	5	6	7	8	Final
(Grisons) Raphaela Keiser	0	0	0	3	1	0	0	1	5
(Canton of Zurich) Nora Wüest	0	1	1	0	0	1	0	0	3

=== Playoffs ===
Final
1	(Aargau) Silvana Tirinzoni	6
2	(Valais) Elena Stern	8

Bronze Medal Game
3	(Canton of Bern) Irene Schori	9
4	(Grisons) Raphaela Keiser	6

==== Bronze medal game ====
Sunday, August 23, 3:30 pm

Sheet 4	1	2	3	4	5	6	7	8	Final
(Canton of Bern) Irene Schori	0	3	0	1	0	3	0	2	9
(Grisons) Raphaela Keiser	0	0	1	0	3	0	2	0	6

==== Final ====
Sunday, August 23, 3:30 pm

Sheet 2	1	2	3	4	5	6	7	8	Final
(Aargau) Silvana Tirinzoni	0	2	1	1	0	0	2	0	6
(Valais) Elena Stern	1	0	0	0	3	1	0	3	8
