= 2017 Swiss Olympic curling trials =

2017 Swiss Olympic Curling Trials
- Host city: Biel-Bienne, Switzerland
- Dates: October 11–14
- Winner: Silvana Tirinzoni
- Curling club: Aarau CC
- Skip: Silvana Tirinzoni
- Third: Manuela Siegrist
- Second: Esther Neuenschwander
- Lead: Marlene Albrecht

The 2017 Swiss Olympic Curling Trials were held from October 11 to 14 at the Curlinghalle Biel in Biel-Bienne, Switzerland. The winning team represented Switzerland at the 2018 Winter Olympics. There was only a women's event, as the Peter de Cruz rink has already been chosen to represent Switzerland in men's curling.

The Silvana Tirinzoni rink from Aarau won the event, after posting a 6-0 round robin record, rendering a playoff unnecessary.

== Round-robin standings ==
Key
Teams to Final (if necessary)

Skip	W	L	PF	PA
Silvana Tirinzoni (Aarau)	6	0	43	35
Alina Pätz (Baden)	1	4	32	35
Binia Feltscher (Flims)	1	4	31	36

== Scores ==
=== Draw 1 ===
October 11, 14:00

Sheet 3	1	2	3	4	5	6	7	8	9	10	Final
Silvana Tirinzoni	0	2	0	0	2	0	0	1	0	2	7
Alina Pätz	0	0	0	2	0	2	1	0	1	0	6

=== Draw 2 ===
October 11, 19:00

Sheet 2	1	2	3	4	5	6	7	8	9	10	Final
Binia Feltscher	0	0	2	0	2	0	1	0	2	1	8
Silvana Tirinzoni	0	2	0	2	0	3	0	2	0	0	9

=== Draw 3 ===
October 12, 09:00

Sheet 4	1	2	3	4	5	6	7	8	9	10	Final
Alina Pätz	0	1	0	2	1	2	3	0	0	X	9
Binia Feltscher	1	0	2	0	0	0	0	2	1	X	6

=== Draw 4 ===
October 12, 14:00

Sheet 3	1	2	3	4	5	6	7	8	9	10	Final
Binia Feltscher	0	1	0	0	1	0	0	0	2	2	6
Silvana Tirinzoni	0	0	2	0	0	3	1	1	0	0	7

=== Draw 5 ===
October 12, 19:00

Sheet 2	1	2	3	4	5	6	7	8	9	10	11	Final
Silvana Tirinzoni	0	0	1	0	1	0	2	0	2	0	1	7
Alina Pätz	1	0	0	1	0	1	0	1	0	2	0	6

=== Draw 6 ===
October 13, 09:00

Sheet 4	1	2	3	4	5	6	7	8	9	10	Final
Silvana Tirinzoni	0	0	1	0	0	3	0	0	2	1	7
Alina Pätz	2	0	0	1	0	0	0	3	0	0	6

=== Draw 7 ===
October 13, 14:00

Sheet 3	1	2	3	4	5	6	7	8	9	10	Final
Alina Pätz	0	0	1	0	1	1	0	2	0	X	5
Binia Feltscher	2	1	0	2	0	0	1	0	2	X	8

=== Draw 8 ===
October 13, 19:00

Sheet 4	1	2	3	4	5	6	7	8	9	10	Final
Binia Feltscher	0	0	0	3	0	0	0	0	0	X	3
Silvana Tirinzoni	0	0	2	0	0	1	1	1	1	X	6

=== Draw 9 ===
October 14, 09:00

Sheet 2	1	2	3	4	5	6	7	8	9	10	Final
Alina Pätz											0
Binia Feltscher											0

(Not played; unnecessary)
