= Silvana Tirinzoni =

Swiss curler (born 1979)

- Curler
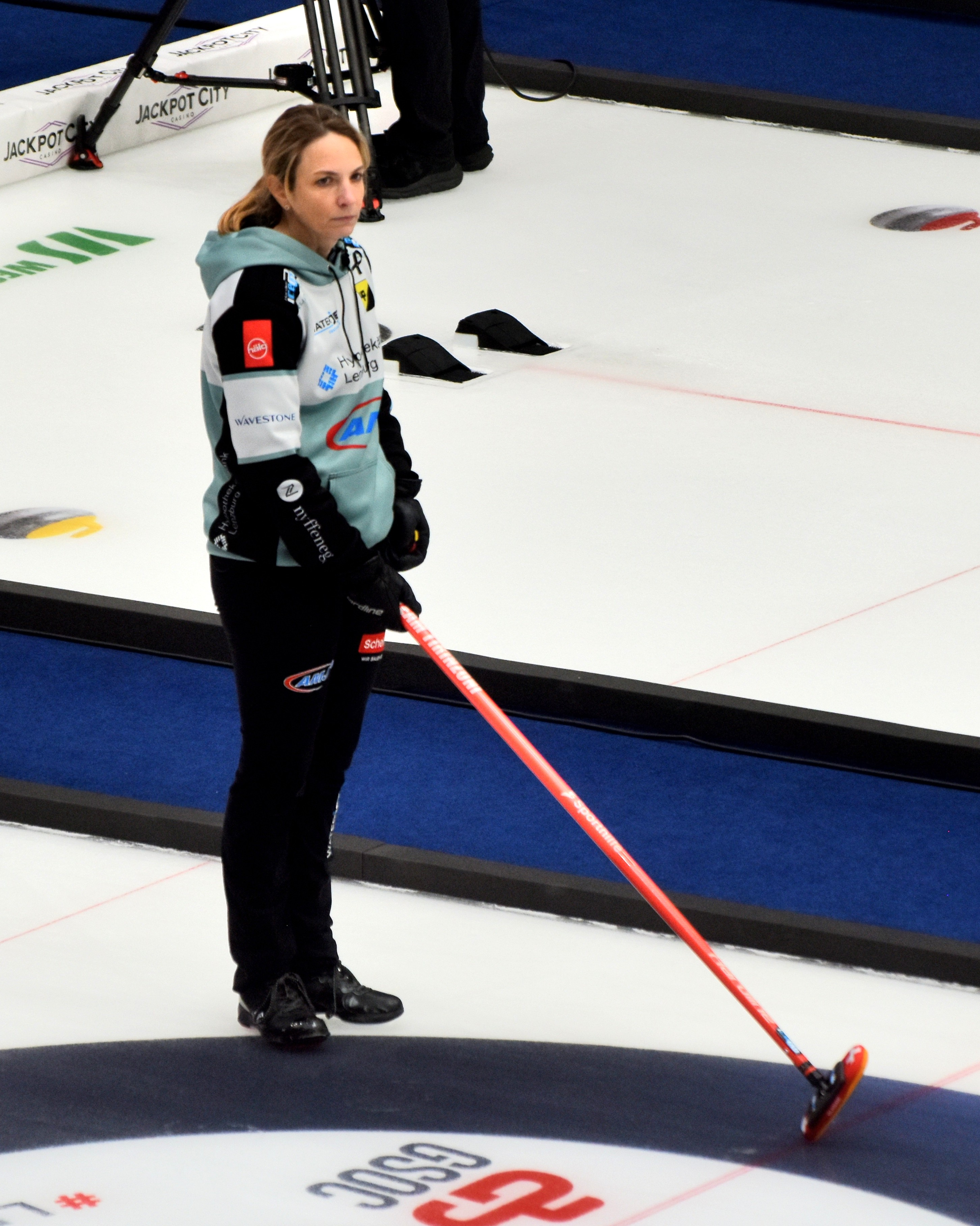
- Tirinzoni at the 2026 Players' Championship in Steinbach, Manitoba.
- Born: 25 June 1979 (age 47); Dielsdorf, Switzerland

Team
- Curling club: CC Aarau, Aarau, SUI

Curling career
- Member Association: Switzerland
- World Championship: 9 (2006, 2007, 2013, 2019, 2021, 2022, 2023, 2024, 2025)
- European Championship: 8 (2007, 2017, 2018, 2019, 2021, 2022, 2023, 2024)
- Olympic: 3 (2018, 2022, 2026)
- Grand Slam victories: 7 (2015 Tour Challenge, 2019 Champions Cup, 2022 National, 2024 Players', 2025 Players', 2025 Canadian Open, 2026 Players' (Jan.))
Medal record
Women's curling
Representing Switzerland
Olympic Games
Silver medal – second place	2026 Milano Cortina	Team
World Championships
Gold medal – first place	2019 Silkeborg
Gold medal – first place	2021 Calgary
Gold medal – first place	2022 Prince George
Gold medal – first place	2023 Sandviken
Silver medal – second place	2024 Sydney
Silver medal – second place	2025 Uijeongbu
European Championships
Gold medal – first place	2023 Aberdeen
Gold medal – first place	2024 Lohja
Silver medal – second place	2018 Tallinn
Silver medal – second place	2022 Östersund
Bronze medal – third place	2019 Helsingborg
World Junior Championships
Gold medal – first place	1999 Östersund
European Mixed Championships
Bronze medal – third place	2014 Copenhagen

Silvana Petra Tirinzoni (born 25 June 1979) is a retired Swiss curler from Zurich. She skipped her team to win the silver medal at 2026 Winter Olympics. She is a four-time women's world champion skip (2019, 2021, 2022, 2023) and seven-time Grand Slam champion. She is a former world junior champion and two-time European champion. Tirinzoni also represented Switzerland at the 2018 and 2022 Winter Olympics.

== Career ==
In 1997, Tirinzoni was the Swiss alternate for Bianca Röthlisberger at the World Junior Curling Championships. The team finished seventh. The following year, Tirinzoni was the Swiss skip at the World Juniors, and she and her team of Michèle Knobel, Brigitte Schori and Martina von Arx finished sixth. In 1999, the same team returned to the Juniors and won the whole tournament for Switzerland. After finishing the round robin in second place with a 7–2 record, Tirinzoni led Switzerland to a semi-final win over Sweden's Matilda Mattsson and a final win against Japan (skipped by Akiko Katoh) to win the gold medal.

In 2005, Tirinzoni finished fourth at the Swiss Olympic trials. The following year she qualified for the 2006 World Women's Curling Championship, her first. Her Swiss team finished in tenth place with a 3–8 record.

Tirinzoni returned to the 2007 World Women's Curling Championship with nearly the same team as in 2006, adding veteran Mirjam Ott to the lineup. Ott moved into the third position when the team began with three losses, and they nearly came back to qualify for the playoff round. Switzerland fell just short, finishing fifth with a 6–5 record. Later that year, Ott returned the favour by making Tirinzoni her alternate at the 2007 European Curling Championships. Tirinzoni would not see any action, and the team finished fourth.

In 2011, Tirinzoni won her first World Curling Tour event, the Red Deer Curling Classic. She would not play in an international championship until 2013 when she skipped Switzerland at the 2013 World Women's Curling Championship. After finishing the round robin with a 6–5 record, she found herself in a three-way tie for fourth. After beating Russia's Anna Sidorova in the first tiebreaker, she lost to the United States' Erika Brown in the second, settling for fifth place. Since then, Tirinzoni has won several World Curling Tour events, including the 2013 International Bernese Ladies Cup, the 2013 Stockholm Ladies Cup, the 2013 Women's Masters Basel and the 2014 Pomeroy Inn & Suites Prairie Showdown.

Tirinzoni and her rink began the 2014–15 season by winning their first event, the 2014 Stu Sells Oakville Tankard. She then went off to skip the Swiss team (throwing third rocks) at the 2014 European Mixed Curling Championship. She would lead her rink of Martin Rios, Romano Meier and Jenny Perret to a bronze medal.

While Tirinzoni did not return to international competition for a while (due to strong competition in her home country from teams like Alina Pätz and Binia Feltscher), she and her rink have been strong on the World Curling Tour since then. The 2015–16 season included three tournament wins, including the first slam of the year, the 2015 GSOC Tour Challenge, where she beat the World #1 Rachel Homan rink in the final. The team would also win the International Bernese Ladies Cup and the Glynhill Ladies International later that year, while she led her team to four other tournament finals.

Tirinzoni continued her WCT success the following season, winning their first event, the 2016 Stu Sells Oakville Tankard, but did not win any further tournaments. She began the 2017–18 season by defending her Oakville Tankard title, which would be the third time she would win that tournament.

In one of the strongest countries, with three different World Champions, including a two-time World Champion and two-time Olympic silver medalist, Tirinzoni won the right to be the Switzerland representative at the 2018 Winter Olympics. Her team finished undefeated throughout the 2017 Swiss Olympic Curling Trials. At the games, the team just missed out on a playoff spot, finishing with a 4–5 record.

Heading into the 2018–19 season, Tirinzoni joined forces with Alina Pätz, who threw fourth rocks with Tirinzoni skipping at the third position, with Esther Neuenschwander at second and Melanie Barbezat throwing lead rocks. The team reached the final in the first Grand Slam of the season, the Elite 10. They represented Switzerland at the 2018 European Curling Championships claiming the silver medal, going on an unbeaten 9–0 run to finish top of the Round Robin, before defeating Germany 6–4 in the semi-final, and falling 5–4 to Sweden's Anna Hasselborg in the final. Having won the 2019 Swiss National Championships, the team represented Switzerland at the 2019 World Women's Curling Championship in Silkeborg, Denmark. The team got off to a shaky start posting a 2–3 record in their first five games before winning six in a row to secure their playoff spot, and, after a final round dead rubber loss, a round robin record of 8–4 and 4th place in the standings. Tight victories over China in the qualification game and South Korea in the semifinal set up a repeat of the European Championship final against Hasselborg and Sweden. They turned the tables on Sweden, with Pätz making a draw to the four-foot in the extra end for an 8–7 win, which meant they were crowned the 2019 world champions. The team capped off their year with their first Grand Slam title together at the Champions Cup and reached the final of the inaugural Curling World Cup.

At the start of the 2019–20 season, Team Tirinzoni were runners-up at the 2019 Cameron's Brewing Oakville Fall Classic. They also qualified for the playoffs at their next three events, the 2019 Stu Sells Oakville Tankard, the 2019 AMJ Campbell Shorty Jenkins Classic and the 2019 WCT Uiseong International Curling Cup. The next week, they won the Women's Masters Basel. They represented Switzerland at the 2019 European Curling Championships, where they finished the round robin in first place with an 8–1 record. However, they would not make the final, as they lost to Scotland's Eve Muirhead in the semifinal. They rebounded in the bronze medal game, defeating Alina Kovaleva of Russia. The team was not able to defend their Swiss championship, losing the final of the 2020 Swiss Women's Curling Championship to the young Elena Stern rink. The Swiss championship would be the team's last event of the season, as both the Players' Championship and the Champions Cup Grand Slam events were cancelled due to the COVID-19 pandemic.

Tirinzoni began the 2020–21 season by making the final of the 2020 Schweizer Cup, where they once again lost to the Stern rink. Three weeks later, her team was invited to play in the Adelboden International men's World Curling Tour event, as a last-minute addition. After dropping their first game to Yannick Schwaller, they went on a four-game winning streak against the men's field before losing to Olympic bronze medallist Peter de Cruz in the semifinal. In January 2021, Tirinzoni competed at the 2021 Swiss Mixed Doubles Curling Championship with partner Benoît Schwarz. The pair finished the round robin with a 4–3 record before losing to teammate Alina Pätz and Sven Michel in the semifinal. Two weeks later, Tirinzoni won her fifth national championship at the 2021 Swiss Women's Curling Championship. This put her in a playoff against 2020 Champions Team Stern for the right to represent Switzerland at the 2021 World Women's Curling Championship, as the 2020 Worlds were cancelled due to the COVID-19 pandemic. Tirinzoni beat Stern in the playoff, and represented Switzerland at the World Championship, which was played in a bio-secure bubble in Calgary, Canada due to the pandemic. There, she led her rink to a 12–1 round robin record, including scoring a rare eight-ender against Denmark, the first time an eight-ender has ever been scored at a World Championship. In the playoffs, Tirinzoni defeated the United States in the semifinal, and then Alina Kovaleva representing RCF (Russia) in the final to win the gold medal, successfully defending her 2019 championship, becoming the first Swiss skip to win back to back titles. While also in the Calgary bubble, Team Tirinzoni played in two Grand Slam events, making the final at the 2021 Champions Cup and the semifinals at the 2021 Players' Championship.

Team Tirinzoni had a slow start to the 2021–22 season, not reaching any finals in their first five tour events. At the first two Slams, the 2021 Masters and the 2021 National, they went undefeated until losses in the quarterfinals and semifinals, respectively. At the 2021 European Curling Championships, the team failed to reach the playoffs for the first time, finishing in fifth with a 6–3 record. The next event the team played in was the 2022 Winter Olympics, where they found their footing for the first time during the season. They finished in first place after the preliminary round with an 8–1 round robin record. This earned them the top seed in the playoff round. They then, however, lost the semifinal to Japan's Satsuki Fujisawa and the bronze medal game to Sweden's Anna Hasselborg, placing fourth. Immediately after the Olympics, the team entered the Swiss Women's Curling Championship where they were once again able to defend their title, earning the right to represent Switzerland at the 2022 World Women's Curling Championship. At the championship, Team Tirinzoni dominated the competition, finishing the round robin with an unblemished 12–0 record. They then beat Sweden's Hasselborg in the semifinal to qualify once again for the world championship final where they would face South Korea's Kim Eun-jung. Switzerland took a three point lead early, but Korea was able to tie the match later on. In the end, Alina Pätz executed an open hit to win the match 7–6 and repeat for a third time as world women's curling champions. On 25 April, the team announced that they would be splitting up at the end of the season, with front end Esther Neuenschwander and Melanie Barbezat stepping away from competitive curling. Team Tirinzoni ended their four year run together with the final two Slam events of the season, the 2022 Players' Championship and the 2022 Champions Cup, where they had quarterfinal and semifinal finishes respectively. On 12 May, Tirinzoni and Pätz announced that they would be staying together and adding Carole Howald and Briar Schwaller-Hürlimann to their team for the 2022–23 season.

The new Tirinzoni rink found immediate success on tour, going undefeated in their first event to win the Summer Series. The following week, they lost to Team Clancy Grandy in the final of the 2022 Martensville International. The team next competed in the 2022 Women's Masters Basel where they lost in the semifinal to Raphaela Keiser. They bounced back immediately the following week at the 2022 Stu Sells Toronto Tankard, again going undefeated to claim their second event title of the season. Team Tirinzoni continued their strong play into the first Slam event of the season, the 2022 National. After an undefeated round robin record, the team beat Jennifer Jones 7–3 in the quarterfinals, Kaitlyn Lawes 7–5 in the semifinals, and Kerri Einarson 7–3 in the championship game to win their third tour event and Tirinzoni's third Grand Slam title. The team was back on the ice the following week at the 2022 Western Showdown where after dropping their first game, they won seven straight to claim another title. Team Tirinzoni's event streak came to an end at the 2022 Tour Challenge where after a 4–0 round robin record, they lost 9–2 in the quarterfinals to Isabella Wranå. Next for the team was the 2022 European Curling Championships where they finished third in the round robin with a 6–3 record. They then beat Italy's Stefania Constantini in the semifinal before dropping the championship game 8–4 to Denmark's Madeleine Dupont. After much success in the first half of the season, the team missed the playoffs at their next two events, the 2022 Masters and the 2023 Canadian Open. They rebounded, however, at the 2023 International Bernese Ladies Cup, going a perfect 8–0 to win the event. At the 2023 Swiss Women's Curling Championship, the team defended their title for a third year in a row, winning 6–4 over Corrie Hürlimann in the championship game. This qualified Team Tirinzoni for the 2023 World Women's Curling Championship where they continued their winning streak at the World Championship, again going 12–0 through the round robin. They then topped Sweden's Anna Hasselborg 8–4 to qualify for the final against Norway's Marianne Rørvik. Despite not having their best game, the Swiss team stole two in the tenth end to win the game 6–3 and secure their fourth consecutive World Championship title. With the win, the team also took the record for the most consecutive victories at the Women's World Championship, now at 36 games. Team Tirinzoni ended their season at the final two Slams of the season, the 2023 Players' Championship and the 2023 Champions Cup. At the Players', the team lost two straight before going on a six-game winning streak to qualify for the final. There, they lost 6–5 to Isabella Wranå. Prior to the Champions Cup, the team's last event of the season, they announced they had removed Briar Schwaller-Hürlimann from the team for "team harmony" reasons. The team made the decision while Schwaller-Hürlimann was playing in the 2023 World Mixed Doubles Curling Championship, but did not tell her until she travelled to Canada to play in the Champions Cup. Schwaller-Hürlimann was replaced by Rachel Erickson at the tournament, where they missed the playoffs with a 1–4 record. Days later, it was announced that Selina Witschonke was replacing Schwaller-Hürlimann on the team at second with Howald shifting to lead.

To begin the 2023–24 season, Team Tirinzoni won 14 straight games in their first two events to claim the 2023 Women's Masters Basel and the 2023 AMJ Campbell Shorty Jenkins Classic, going an undefeated 7–0 at both. They then reached the quarterfinals of the 2023 Players Open where they lost to Kim Eun-jung. At the first Slam of the season, the 2023 Tour Challenge, the team had an undefeated record through the round robin before losing 7–4 in the quarterfinals to Jennifer Jones. They bounced back immediately with another undefeated run to win the Stu Sells 1824 Halifax Classic, their third title of the season. At the 2023 National, the team had another playoff appearance but lost in the semifinals to Korea's Gim Eun-ji. In November 2023, Team Tirinzoni won the gold medal at the 2023 European Curling Championships for the first time, finishing a perfect 11–0 through the event. In the final, they defeated Italy's Stefania Constantini 6–5 after a perfect hit-and-roll to the button on Pätz' final shot. They then lost in the quarterfinals of the 2023 Western Showdown to Isabella Wranå. At the next two Slams, the 2023 Masters and the 2024 Canadian Open, the team made two straight finals where they lost to Rachel Homan on both occasions. In the latter, they lost on an extra end steal after Pätz' draw went too far. They followed this with a quarterfinal finish at the 2024 International Bernese Ladies Cup, dropping a 4–3 decision to the Xenia Schwaller junior rink. Despite already being selected for the 2024 World Women's Curling Championship, Team Tirinzoni won their fourth straight Swiss Women's Championship in February by defeating Team Schwaller in the final. At the World Championship, the team won their first six games, extending their winning streak to 42 straight games. In the seventh game, however, they met Canada's Homan rink where they fell 8–5, ending their undefeated run. They finished the round robin in second place overall with a 10–2 record after another loss to Scotland's Rebecca Morrison. After beating Italy's Constantini in the semifinal, they faced off against Team Homan again in the final. After controlling most of the first half of the game, the Swiss rink led 5–4 in the ninth end. On her last rock, Homan made a split of a rock in the 12-foot to score three, giving the Canadians a 7–5 lead. Team Tirinzoni then conceded the game in the tenth after deciding they didn't have a shot to tie the game, ending their reign as world champions for the first time since 2019. They ended the season on a positive note, however, as at the 2024 Players' Championship they beat the Homan rink in the semifinals before defeating Team Wranå 6–5 in the final with Tirinzoni claiming her fourth career Slam title.

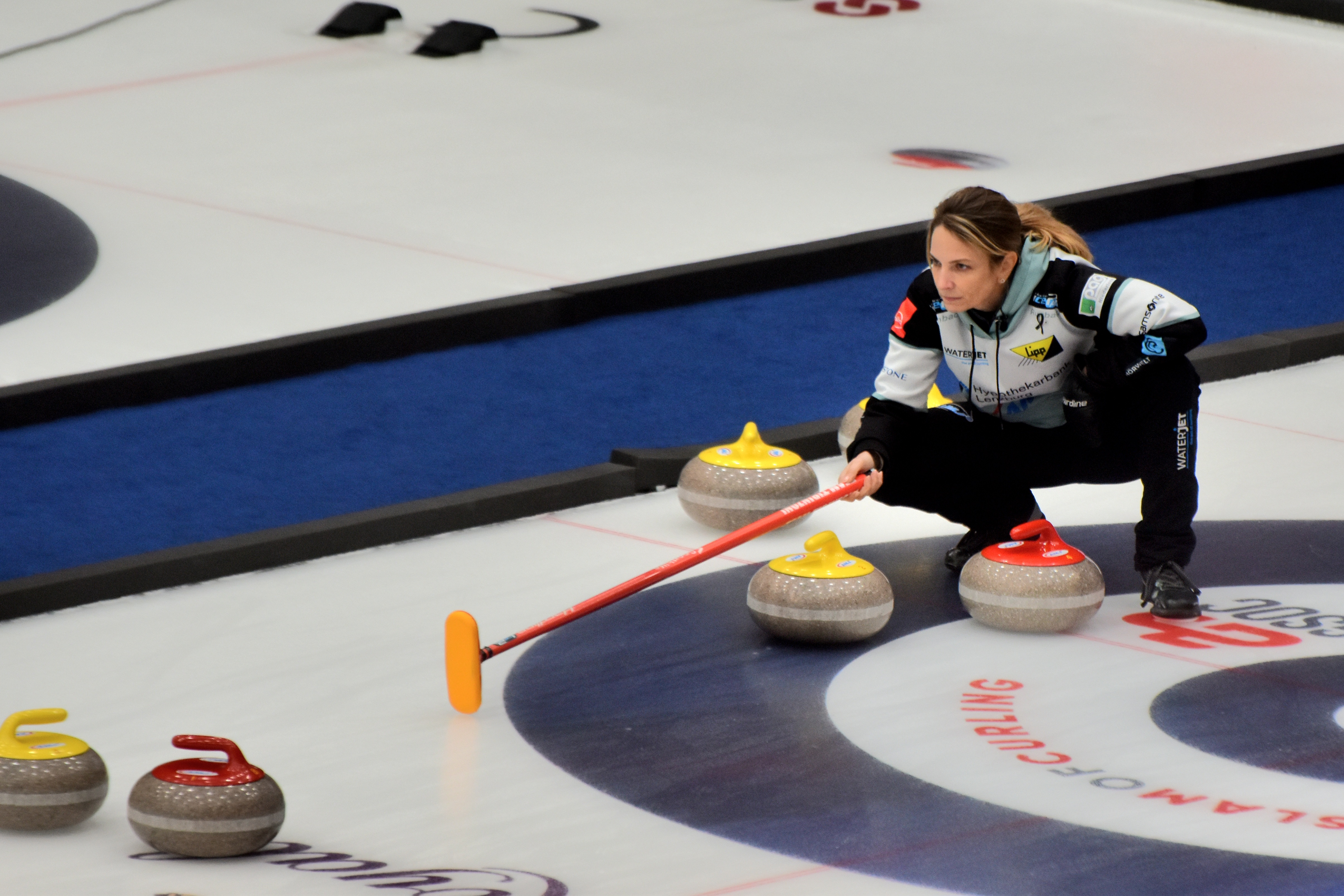
Tirinzoni holds the broom for a shot at the 2026 Players' Championship in Steinbach, Manitoba.

Team Tirinzoni kicked off the 2024–25 season by finishing runner-up to Team Homan at the 2024 AMJ Campbell Shorty Jenkins Classic. They then played in the 2024 Women's Masters Basel where they defended their title, defeating Anna Hasselborg in the final. After failing to qualify at the 2024 Tour Challenge, they had an undefeated run at the 2024 Stu Sells Toronto Tankard up until the final where they lost to Kim Eun-jung. At the Swiss European Qualifier, they easily beat the Xenia Schwaller rink 4–0 in the best-of-seven series, securing their spot at the 2024 European Curling Championships. Before the Euros, they reached the final of the 2024 Canadian Open Slam, dropping a 7–5 decision to the Homan rink. They bounced back with a dominant performance at the Europeans, again winning all 11 of their games to secure the title. At the next two Slams, the 2024 National and the 2025 Masters, they lost in a tiebreaker and quarterfinal to Ha Seung-youn and Rachel Homan respectively. They rebounded again at the 2025 International Bernese Ladies Cup, however, claiming their third championship of the season. The following month, they went undefeated at the Swiss Championship until the playoffs where they lost both the 1 vs. 2 game and the semifinal. This third-place finish meant they would not qualify as the Swiss representatives for the 2025 European Curling Championships the following season, despite being two-time defending champions. Still, they represented the country at the 2025 World Women's Curling Championship where they went 11–1 in the round robin, only losing to Canada. After beating China's Wang Rui in the semifinal, they lost in the final for a second straight year to Team Homan, settling for silver. Despite losing the previous five meetings, Team Tirinzoni beat Team Homan 5–4 in the final of the 2025 Players' Championship to end the season.

== Personal life ==
Tirinzoni studied business administration at the University of Zurich and completed further training as a financial analyst and investment advisor. She worked for seven years as a project manager at a bank, and starting in 2019 she focused entirely on sports.

== Grand Slam record ==
Key
C	Champion
F	Lost in Final
SF	Lost in Semifinal
QF	Lost in Quarterfinals
R16	Lost in the round of 16
Q	Did not advance to playoffs
T2	Played in Tier 2 event
DNP	Did not participate in event
N/A	Not a Grand Slam event that season

Event	2011–12	2012–13	2013–14	2014–15	2015–16	2016–17	2017–18	2018–19	2019–20	2020–21	2021–22	2022–23	2023–24	2024–25	2025–26
Masters	N/A	SF	DNP	QF	QF	SF	QF	Q	SF	N/A	QF	Q	F	QF	F
Tour Challenge	N/A	N/A	N/A	N/A	C	Q	QF	QF	QF	N/A	N/A	QF	QF	Q	F
The National	N/A	N/A	N/A	N/A	Q	F	DNP	SF	Q	N/A	SF	C	SF	Q	F
Canadian Open	N/A	N/A	N/A	Q	Q	F	QF	F	QF	N/A	N/A	Q	F	F	C
Players'	Q	Q	SF	Q	SF	SF	SF	Q	N/A	SF	QF	F	C	C	C
Champions Cup	N/A	N/A	N/A	N/A	SF	QF	QF	C	N/A	F	SF	Q	N/A	N/A	N/A

=== Former events ===
Event	2011–12	2012–13	2013–14	2014–15	2015–16	2016–17	2017–18	2018–19
Elite 10	N/A	N/A	N/A	N/A	N/A	N/A	N/A	F
Colonial Square	N/A	Q	DNP	SF	N/A	N/A	N/A	N/A
Manitoba Liquor & Lotteries	DNP	DNP	SF	N/A	N/A	N/A	N/A	N/A

== Teams ==
Season	Skip	Third	Second	Lead	Alternate
1997–98	Silvana Tirinzoni	Michèle Knobel	Brigitte Schori	Martina von Arx	Carine Mattille (WJCC)
1998–99	Silvana Tirinzoni	Michèle Knobel	Brigitte Schori	Martina von Arx	Carmen Schäfer (WJCC)
2005–06	Silvana Tirinzoni	Sandra Attinger	Anna Neuenschwander	Esther Neuenschwander	Carmen Schäfer (WCC)
2006–07	Silvana Tirinzoni	Esther Neuenschwander	Anna Neuenschwander	Sandra Attinger	Mirjam Ott (WCC)
2007–08	Silvana Tirinzoni	Esther Neuenschwander	Anna Neuenschwander	Sandra Attinger	
2008–09	Silvana Tirinzoni	Carmen Küng	Irene Schori	Christine Urech	
2009–10	Silvana Tirinzoni	Irene Schori	Christine Urech	Sandra Gantenbein	
2010–11	Silvana Tirinzoni	Irene Schori	Esther Neuenschwander	Sandra Gantenbein	
2011–12	Silvana Tirinzoni	Irene Schori	Esther Neuenschwander	Sandra Gantenbein	
2012–13	Silvana Tirinzoni	Marlene Albrecht	Esther Neuenschwander	Sandra Gantenbein	Manuela Siegrist (WCC)
2013–14	Silvana Tirinzoni	Manuela Siegrist	Esther Neuenschwander	Marlene Albrecht	
2014–15	Silvana Tirinzoni	Manuela Siegrist	Esther Neuenschwander	Marlene Albrecht	
2015–16	Silvana Tirinzoni	Manuela Siegrist	Esther Neuenschwander	Marlene Albrecht	
2016–17	Silvana Tirinzoni	Manuela Siegrist; Cathy Overton-Clapham	Esther Neuenschwander	Marlene Albrecht	
2017–18	Silvana Tirinzoni	Manuela Siegrist (Note: Siegrist and Neuenschwander switched positions partway through the season.)	Esther Neuenschwander	Marlene Albrecht	Jenny Perret (ECC, OG)
2018–19	Alina Pätz (Fourth)	Silvana Tirinzoni (Skip)	Esther Neuenschwander	Melanie Barbezat	Marisa Winkelhausen (ECC, WCC)
2019–20	Alina Pätz (Fourth)	Silvana Tirinzoni (Skip)	Esther Neuenschwander	Melanie Barbezat	
2020–21	Alina Pätz (Fourth)	Silvana Tirinzoni (Skip)	Esther Neuenschwander	Melanie Barbezat	Carole Howald (WCC)
2021–22	Alina Pätz (Fourth)	Silvana Tirinzoni (Skip)	Esther Neuenschwander	Melanie Barbezat	Carole Howald (ECC, OG, WCC)
2022–23	Alina Pätz (Fourth)	Silvana Tirinzoni (Skip)	Carole Howald	Briar Schwaller-Hürlimann	Anna Gut (ECC)
2023–24	Alina Pätz (Fourth)	Silvana Tirinzoni (Skip)	Selina Witschonke	Carole Howald	Stefanie Berset (ECC, WCC)
2024–25	Alina Pätz (Fourth)	Silvana Tirinzoni (Skip)	Carole Howald	Selina Witschonke	Stefanie Berset (ECC, WCC)
2025–26	Alina Pätz (Fourth)	Silvana Tirinzoni (Skip)	Carole Howald	Selina Witschonke	Stefanie Berset (OG)
