= Esther Neuenschwander =

Swiss curler (born 1983)

- Curler
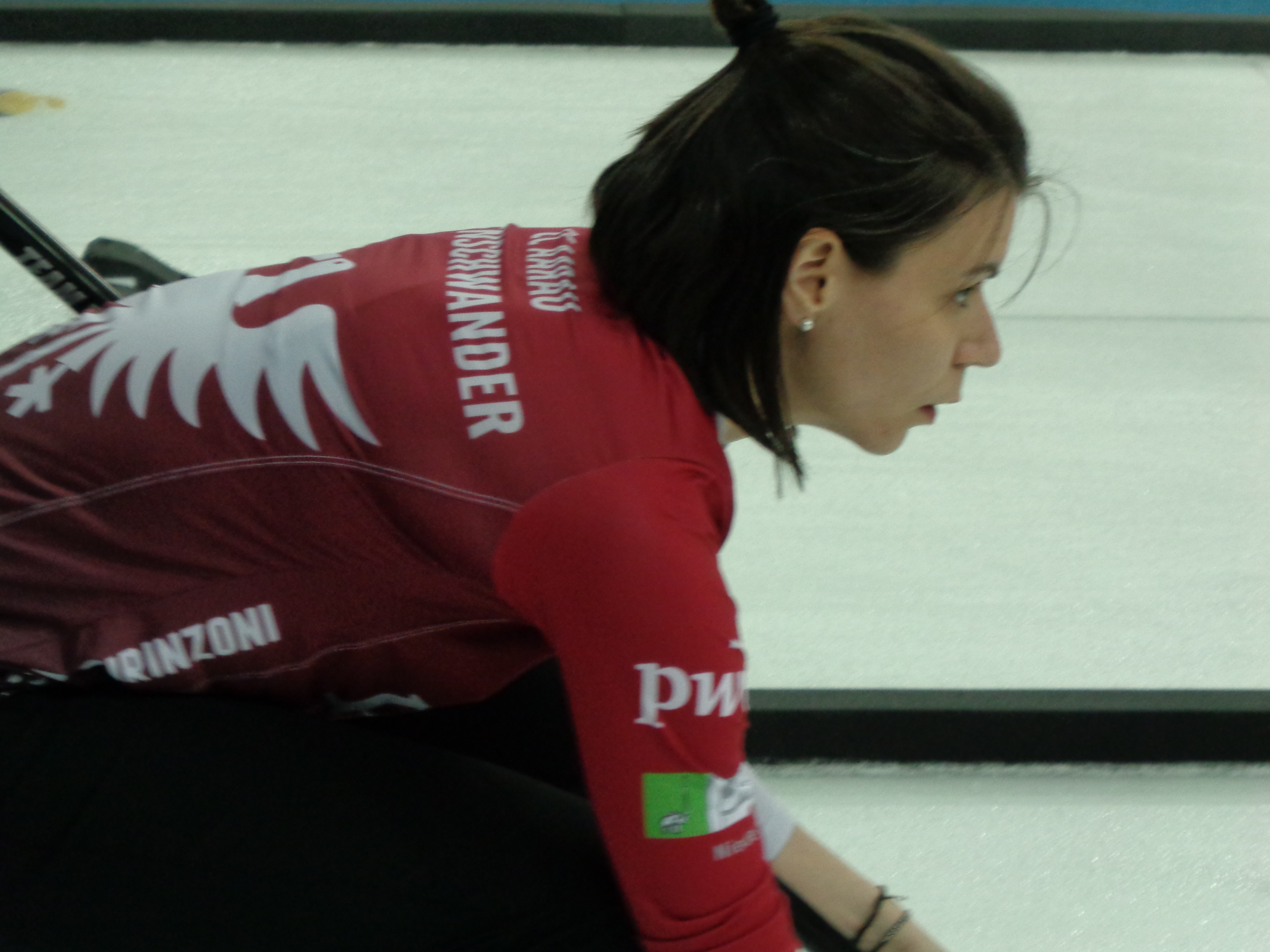
- Neuenschwander at the Players Championship 2018
- Born: 30 September 1983 (age 43); Zürich, Switzerland

Team
- Curling club: CC Aarau, Aarau, SUI

Curling career
- Member Association: Switzerland
- World Championship: 6 (2006, 2007, 2013, 2019, 2021, 2022)
- European Championship: 4 (2017, 2018, 2019, 2021)
- Olympic: 2 (2018, 2022)
- Grand Slam victories: 2 (2015 Tour Challenge, 2019 Champions Cup)
Medal record
Women's curling
Representing Switzerland
World Curling Championships
Gold medal – first place	2019 Silkeborg
Gold medal – first place	2021 Calgary
Gold medal – first place	2022 Prince George
European Championships
Silver medal – second place	2018 Tallinn
Bronze medal – third place	2019 Helsingborg

Esther Neuenschwander (born 30 September 1983) is a Swiss retired curler.

== Career ==
In 2006, Neuenschwander qualified for her first World Women's Curling Championship playing lead for Silvana Tirinzoni. The Swiss team struggled, finishing in tenth place with a 3–8 record. The following year, she returned to the Worlds at the 2007 Championship, this time playing third for Tirinzoni. The Swiss team lost their first three games but then turned things around, and they nearly came back to qualify for the playoff round. Switzerland fell just short, finishing fifth with a 6–5 record.

In 2011, Neuenschwander won her first World Curling Tour event, the Red Deer Curling Classic. She would not play in an international championship until 2013 when she played second for Switzerland at the 2013 World Women's Curling Championship. After finishing the round robin with a 6–5 record, she found herself in a three-way tie for fourth. After beating Russia's Anna Sidorova in the first tiebreaker, she lost to the United States' Erika Brown in the second, settling for fifth place. Team Tirinzoni has won several World Curling Tour since then, including the 2013 International Bernese Ladies Cup, the 2013 Stockholm Ladies Cup, the 2013 Women's Masters Basel and the 2014 Pomeroy Inn & Suites Prairie Showdown.

Neuenschwander and her rink began the 2014–15 season by winning their first event, the 2014 Stu Sells Oakville Tankard. They also qualified for the playoffs at several other events and finished second at the Swiss nationals.

While Neuenschwander did not return to international competition for a while (due to strong competition in her home country from teams like Alina Pätz and Binia Feltscher), she and her rink have been strong on the World Curling Tour since then. The 2015–16 season included three tournament wins, including the first slam of the year, the 2015 GSOC Tour Challenge, where they beat the World #1 Rachel Homan rink in the final. The team would also win the International Bernese Ladies Cup and the Glynhill Ladies International later that year. They also made four other tournament finals.

The Tirinzoni rink continued their WCT success the following season, winning their first event, the 2016 Stu Sells Oakville Tankard, but did not win any further tournaments. They began the 2017–18 season by defending their Oakville Tankard title, which would be the third time she would win that tournament.

In one of the strongest countries, with three different World Champions, including a two-time World Champion and two-time Olympic silver medalist, Team Tirinzoni won the right to be the Switzerland representative at the 2018 Winter Olympics. Her team finished undefeated throughout the 2017 Swiss Olympic Curling Trials. At the games, the team just missed out on a playoff spot, finishing with a 4–5 record.

Heading into the 2018–19 curling season, Neuenschwander and Tirinzoni joined forces with Alina Pätz, who threw fourth rocks with Tirinzoni skipping at the third position. They brought on Melanie Barbezat to throw lead rocks. The team reached the final in the first Grand Slam of the season, the Elite 10. They represented Switzerland at the 2018 European Curling Championships claiming the silver medal, going on an unbeaten 9–0 run to finish top of the Round Robin, before defeating Germany 6–4 in the semi-final, and falling 5–4 to Sweden's Anna Hasselborg in the final. Having won the 2019 Swiss National Championships, the team represented Switzerland at the 2019 World Women's Curling Championship in Silkeborg, Denmark. The team got off to a shaky start posting a 2–3 record in their first five games before winning six in a row to secure their playoff spot, and, after a final round dead rubber loss, a round robin record of 8–4 and 4th place in the standings. Tight victories over China in the qualification game and South Korea in the semifinal set up a repeat of the European Championship final against Hasselborg and Sweden. They turned the tables on Sweden, with Pätz making a draw to the four-foot in the extra end for an 8–7 win, which meant they were crowned the 2019 world champions. The team capped off their year with their first Grand Slam title together at the Champions Cup and reached the final of the inaugural Curling World Cup.

At the start of the 2019–20 season, Team Tirinzoni were runners-up at the 2019 Cameron's Brewing Oakville Fall Classic. They also qualified for the playoffs at their next three events, the 2019 Stu Sells Oakville Tankard, the 2019 AMJ Campbell Shorty Jenkins Classic and the 2019 WCT Uiseong International Curling Cup. The next week, they won the Women's Masters Basel. They represented Switzerland at the 2019 European Curling Championships, where they finished the round robin in first place with an 8–1 record. However, they would not make the final, as they lost to Scotland's Eve Muirhead in the semifinal. They rebounded in the bronze medal game, defeating Alina Kovaleva of Russia. The team would not get to defend their title as world champions, losing the final of the 2020 Swiss Women's Curling Championship to the young Elena Stern rink. The Swiss championship would be the team's last event of the season, as both the Players' Championship and the Champions Cup Grand Slam events were cancelled due to the COVID-19 pandemic.

Team Tirinzoni began the 2020–21 season by making the final of the 2020 Schweizer Cup, where they once again lost to the Stern rink. Three weeks later, the team was invited to play in the Adelboden International men's World Curling Tour event, as a last-minute addition. After dropping their first game to Yannick Schwaller, they went on a four-game winning streak against the men's field before losing to Olympic bronze medallist Peter de Cruz in the semifinal. In January 2021, Neuenschwander competed at the 2021 Swiss Mixed Doubles Curling Championship with partner Michael Brunner. The pair finished the round robin with a 4–3 record, just missing the playoffs. Two weeks later, Team Tirinzoni won the 2021 Swiss Women's Curling Championship. This put them in a playoff against 2020 Champions Team Stern for the right to represent Switzerland at the 2021 World Women's Curling Championship, as the 2020 Worlds were cancelled due to the COVID-19 pandemic. Team Tirinzoni beat Stern in the playoff and represented Switzerland at the World Championship, which was played in a bio-secure bubble in Calgary, Canada due to the pandemic. There, they finished with a 12–1 round robin record, including scoring a rare eight-ender against Denmark, the first time an eight-ender has ever been scored at a World Championship. In the playoffs, the team defeated the United States in the semifinal, and then Alina Kovaleva representing RCF (Russia) in the final to win the gold medal, successfully defending their 2019 championship. While also in the Calgary bubble, Team Tirinzoni played in two Grand Slam events, making the final at the 2021 Champions Cup and the semifinals at the 2021 Players' Championship.

Team Tirinzoni had a slow start to the 2021–22 season, not reaching any finals in their first five tour events. At the first two Slams, the 2021 Masters and the 2021 National, they went undefeated until losses in the quarterfinals and semifinals, respectively. At the 2021 European Curling Championships, the team failed to reach the playoffs for the first time, finishing in fifth with a 6–3 record. The next event the team played in was the 2022 Winter Olympics, where they found their footing for the first time during the season. They finished in first place after the preliminary round with an 8–1 round robin record. This earned them the top seed in the playoff round. They then, however, lost the semifinal to Japan's Satsuki Fujisawa and the bronze medal game to Sweden's Anna Hasselborg, placing fourth. Immediately after the Olympics, the team entered the Swiss Women's Curling Championship where they were once again able to defend their title, earning the right to represent Switzerland at the 2022 World Women's Curling Championship. At the championship, Team Tirinzoni dominated the competition, finishing the round robin with an unblemished 12–0 record. They then beat Sweden's Hasselborg in the semifinal to qualify once again for the world championship final where they would face South Korea's Kim Eun-jung. Switzerland took a three point lead early, but Korea was able to tie the match later on. In the end, Alina Pätz executed an open hit to win the match 7–6 and repeat for a third time as world women's curling champions. On 25 April the team announced that they would be splitting up at the end of the season, with Neuenschwander retiring from competitive curling. Team Tirinzoni ended their four year run together with the final two Slam events of the season, the 2022 Players' Championship and the 2022 Champions Cup, where they had quarterfinal and semifinal finishes respectively.

== Personal life ==
Neuenschwander is employed as an accountant.

== Teams ==
Season	Skip	Third	Second	Lead
2005–06	Silvana Tirinzoni	Sandra Attinger	Anna Neuenschwander	Esther Neuenschwander
2006–07	Silvana Tirinzoni	Esther Neuenschwander	Anna Neuenschwander	Sandra Attinger
2010–11	Silvana Tirinzoni	Irene Schori	Esther Neuenschwander	Sandra Gantenbein
2011–12	Silvana Tirinzoni	Irene Schori	Esther Neuenschwander	Sandra Gantenbein
2012–13	Silvana Tirinzoni	Marlene Albrecht	Esther Neuenschwander	Sandra Gantenbein
2013–14	Silvana Tirinzoni	Manuela Siegrist	Esther Neuenschwander	Marlene Albrecht
2014–15	Silvana Tirinzoni	Manuela Siegrist	Esther Neuenschwander	Marlene Albrecht
2015–16	Silvana Tirinzoni	Manuela Siegrist	Esther Neuenschwander	Marlene Albrecht
2016–17	Silvana Tirinzoni	Manuela Siegrist; Cathy Overton-Clapham	Esther Neuenschwander	Marlene Albrecht
2017–18	Silvana Tirinzoni	Manuela Siegrist (Note: Siegrist and Neuenschwander switched positions partway through the season.)	Esther Neuenschwander	Marlene Albrecht
2018–19	Alina Pätz (Fourth)	Silvana Tirinzoni (Skip)	Esther Neuenschwander	Melanie Barbezat
2019–20	Alina Pätz (Fourth)	Silvana Tirinzoni (Skip)	Esther Neuenschwander	Melanie Barbezat
2020–21	Alina Pätz (Fourth)	Silvana Tirinzoni (Skip)	Esther Neuenschwander	Melanie Barbezat
2021–22	Alina Pätz (Fourth)	Silvana Tirinzoni (Skip)	Esther Neuenschwander	Melanie Barbezat
