= Marlene Albrecht =

Swiss curler (born 1988)

- Curler
- Born: 13 March 1988 (age 38); Zürich, Switzerland

Team
- Curling club: CC Aarau, Aarau, SUI

Curling career
- Member Association: Switzerland
- World Championship: 1 (2013)
- European Championship: 2 (2011, 2017)
- Olympic: 1 (2018)
- Grand Slam victories: 1 (2015 Tour Challenge)

Marlene Albrecht (born 13 March 1988 in Zürich) is a Swiss curler. She is the former lead for Silvana Tirinzoni and with this rink represented Switzerland at the 2018 Winter Olympics.

== Career ==
Albrecht only competed in one World Women's Curling Championship in 2013 at the Titlis Glacier Mountain World Women's Curling Championship 2013. She was playing third for Silvana Tirinzoni. They lost the second tiebreaker 7-4 to the United States. In 2015, her and her team of Silvana Tirinzoni, Manuela Siegrist and Esther Neuenschwander won the 2015 GSOC Tour Challenge Grand Slam of Curling event. It was the first breakthrough victory for the team. At the 2017 European Curling Championships, Team Tirinzoni finished fourth after losing the bronze medal game to Italy. The team won the 2017 Swiss Olympic Curling Trials which won them the right to represent Switzerland at the 2018 Winter Olympics in Pyongchang. They finished the games with a 4-5 round robin record, missing the playoffs and a medal opportunity. After the season finished, Albrecht and teammate Siegrist announced they would be stepping back from competitive curling. Albrecht now plays mixed doubles with Canadian curler Matt Wozniak.

== Personal life ==
Albrecht is currently employed as an accountant.
