= Sidorov =

Sidorov (masculine), Sidorova (feminine) or Sidorovo (neutral) may refer to:

- Sidorov (surname)

== Villages in Perm Krai, Russia ==
- Bolshaya Sidorova, Kudymkarsky District
- Malaya Sidorova, Kudymkarsky District
- Sidorova (Leninskoye Rural Settlement), Kudymkarsky District, Perm Krai
- Sidorova (Verkh-Invenskoye Rural Settlement), Kudymkarsky District, Perm Krai

== Villages in Vologda Oblast, Russia ==
- Sidorovo, Gryazovetsky District, Vologda Oblast
- Sidorovo, Syamzhensky District, Vologda Oblast
- Sidorovo, Ustyuzhensky District, Vologda Oblast
- Sidorovo, Vashkinsky District, Vologda Oblast
- Sidorovo, Vologodsky District, Vologda Oblast
- Sidorovo, Vytegorsky District, Vologda Oblast

== Other uses ==
- Sidorova Island, an island in the Kara Sea, Russia
- 9005 Sidorova, an asteroid
