= Sidorov (surname) =

Sidorov (Russian: Сидоров, masculine) or Sidorova (Russian: Сидорова, feminine) is a common Russian last name derived from the male given name Sidor (Russian: Сидор, from Isidore (Иси́дор) — gift of Isis) and literally means Sidor's.

The following people share this last name:

- Achim Sidorov (born 1936), Romanian sprint canoer
- Alexei Sidorov (1968–2003), Russian journalist
- Anatoly Sidorov (born 1958), Russian military officer
- Andrey Sidorov (born 1995), Uzbekistani football midfielder
- Maksim Sidorov (disambiguation) – multiple people
- Mikhail Sidorov (1823–1887), Siberian entrepreneur
- Mikhail Sidorov (rugby union) (born 1986), Russian rugby union player
- Nikolay Sidorov (born 1956), Soviet sprinter
- Nikolai Sidorov (footballer) (born 1974), Russian football coach and former player
- Oleg Sidorov (born 1983), Uzbekistan swimmer
- Pavel Sidorov (born 1976), Kazakh swimmer
- Roman Sidorov (1955–2015), Russian football forward
- Vadim Sidorov (born 1959), Russian long-distance runner
- Vasily Sidorov (1945-2020), Soviet and Russian diplomat
- Vitaliy Sidorov (disambiguation) – multiple people
- Vladimir Sidorov (1924–2000), Soviet naval officer
- Yevgeni Sidorov (born 1956), Soviet Russian football midfielder

Sidorova refers to:

- Anastasia Sidorova (born 1996), Russian artistic gymnast
- Anna Sidorova (born 1991), Russian curler
- Anzhelika Sidorova (born 1991), Russian pole vaulter
- Galina Sidorova (1945–2022), Soviet alpine skier
- Ksenija Sidorova (born 1988), Latvian accordionist
- Olga Sidorova (disambiguation) – multiple people
- Maria Sidorova, Russian handball player
- Marina Sidorova (born 1950), Russian sprinter
- Sophia Sidorova (born 1943), public education worker in Ukraine and Crimea
  - 9005 Sidorova, an asteroid named after Sophia
- Tatyana Sidorova (born 1936), Russian speed skater
- Valentina Sidorova (1954–2021), Soviet fencer
- Vera Sidorova (1934–2025), Kazakh-Soviet politician
- Yevgeniya Sidorova (1930–2003), Soviet alpine skier
