= 2020 Russian Women's World Qualification Event =

- Host city: Sochi, Russia
- Arena: Ice Cube Curling Center
- Dates: February 14 – 16
- Winner: Team Kovaleva
- Curling club: Adamant Curling Club, Saint Petersburg
- Skip: Alina Kovaleva
- Third: Maria Komarova
- Second: Galina Arsenkina
- Lead: Ekaterina Kuzmina
- Alternate: Anastasia Danshina
- Coach: Irina Kolesnikova
- Finalist: Anna Sidorova

The 2020 Russian Women's World Qualification Event was held from February 14 to 16 in Sochi, Russia at the Ice Cube Curling Center. The event was used to select the team that was supposed to represent Russia at the 2020 World Women's Curling Championship at the CN Centre in Prince George, British Columbia. However, the World Championships were cancelled due to the COVID-19 pandemic.

Two teams were selected to compete in the event: Team Alina Kovaleva from Saint Petersburg and Team Anna Sidorova (team of various clubs). The competition was held in a best of seven series with a team needing to win four matches to win. The Alina Kovaleva rink won the series 4–1 over the Sidorova rink. The games were broadcast on Russian Curling TV's YouTube Channel. The commentator of the series of qualifying matches was two-time world champion (in mixed doubles and mixed teams) Anastasia Bryzgalova.

== Teams ==
Skip	Third	Second	Lead	Alternate	Coach	Locale
Alina Kovaleva	Maria Komarova	Galina Arsenkina	Ekaterina Kuzmina	Anastasia Danshina	Irina Kolesnikova	CC Adamant, Saint Petersburg
Anna Sidorova; CC Sochi, Sochi	Yulia Portunova; CC Sochi, Sochi	Olga Kotelnikova «CC Dynamo-Dmitrov», Dmitrov	Nkeirouka Ezekh «CC Sparrow Hills», Moscow	—	Sergey Belanov	Various Clubs

== Standings ==
Team
1	Alina Kovaleva	7	7	4	9	8	X	X
2	Anna Sidorova	6	4	8	8	3	X	X

== Results ==
All matches times are listed in Moscow Time (UTC+03:00).

=== Draw 1 ===
Friday, February 14, 4:30 pm

Sheet C	1	2	3	4	5	6	7	8	9	10	Final
Anna Sidorova	2	0	0	1	0	0	2	0	1	0	6
Alina Kovaleva	0	1	1	0	1	1	0	2	0	1	7

=== Draw 2 ===
Saturday, February 15, 9:00 am

Sheet B	1	2	3	4	5	6	7	8	9	10	Final
Alina Kovaleva	1	0	1	2	0	0	0	1	2	Х	7
Anna Sidorova	0	2	0	0	0	1	1	0	0	Х	4

=== Draw 3 ===
Saturday, February 15, 4:30 pm

Sheet C	1	2	3	4	5	6	7	8	9	10	Final
Anna Sidorova	0	1	0	1	0	1	0	0	5	Х	8
Alina Kovaleva	0	0	1	0	1	0	1	1	0	Х	4

=== Draw 4 ===
Sunday, February 16, 9:00 am

Sheet B	1	2	3	4	5	6	7	8	9	10	Final
Alina Kovaleva	0	0	0	2	0	4	0	0	2	1	9
Anna Sidorova	1	1	1	0	2	0	2	1	0	0	8

=== Draw 5 ===
Sunday, February 16, 4:30 pm

Sheet C	1	2	3	4	5	6	7	8	9	10	Final
Anna Sidorova	0	0	2	0	0	0	1	0	Х	Х	3
Alina Kovaleva	3	0	0	0	2	0	0	3	Х	Х	8

- Sidorova only played with three players.
