= Curling at the 2018 Winter Olympics – Qualification =

A total of 10 teams in each tournament (5 athletes per team) qualified for a quota of 100 athletes in curling at the 2018 Winter Olympics. A further 8 mixed doubles pairs qualified for a total of 16 athletes. Therefore, a total of 116 athletes qualified in total to compete in the curling competitions.

== Summary ==
=== Final summary ===
Nations	Men	Women	Mixed doubles	Athletes
Canada	X	X	X	12
China		X	X	7
Denmark	X	X		10
Finland			X	2
Great Britain	X	X		10
Italy	X			5
Japan	X	X		10
Norway	X		X	7
Olympic Athletes from Russia		X	X	7
South Korea	X	X	X	12
Sweden	X	X		10
Switzerland	X	X	X	12
United States	X	X	X	12
Total: 13 NOCs	10	10	8	116

=== Men ===
Means of qualification	Berths	Qualified
Host nation	1	South Korea
Qualification points via World Championships	7	Canada; Sweden; United States; Japan; Switzerland; Great Britain; Norway
Olympic Qualification Event	2	Italy; Denmark
Total	10	

=== Women ===
Means of qualification	Berths	Qualified
Host nation	1	South Korea
Qualification points via World Championships	7	Canada; Olympic Athletes from Russia; Switzerland; Great Britain; United States; Sweden; Japan
Olympic Qualification Event	2	China; Denmark
Total	10	

=== Mixed doubles ===
Means of qualification	Berths	Qualified
Host nation	1	South Korea
Qualification points via World Championships	7	China; Canada; Olympic Athletes from Russia; United States; Switzerland; Norway; Finland
Total	8	

== Qualification timeline ==
Event	Date	Venue
2016 Ford World Women's Curling Championship	19–27 March	Swift Current, Canada
2016 World Men's Curling Championship	2–10 April	Basel, Switzerland
2016 World Mixed Doubles Curling Championship	16–23 April	Karlstad, Sweden
2017 World Women's Curling Championship	18–26 March	Beijing, China
2017 Ford World Men's Curling Championship	1–9 April	Edmonton, Canada
2017 World Mixed Doubles Curling Championship	22–29 April	Lethbridge, Canada
2017 Final qualification event	5–10 December	Plzeň, Czech Republic

== Qualification system ==
Qualification to the curling tournaments at the Winter Olympics was determined through two methods. Nations qualified teams by earning qualification points from performances at the 2016 and 2017 World Curling Championships. Teams also qualified through an Olympic qualification event which was held in December 2017. Seven nations qualified teams via World Championship qualification points, while two nations qualified through the qualification event (nations who competed at the 2014 and/or 2015 Worlds and did not score points were also eligible to compete at this tournament). As host nation, South Korea qualified teams automatically, thus making a total of ten teams per gender in the curling tournaments. For the mixed doubles competition, the top seven ranked teams earning qualification points from performances at the 2016 and 2017 World Mixed Doubles Curling Championship qualified along with hosts South Korea.

=== Qualification points ===
The qualification points are allotted based on the nations' final rankings at the World Championships. The points are distributed as follows:

Final rank	1	2	3	4	5	6	7	8	9	10	11	12
Points	14	12	10	9	8	7	6	5	4	3	2	1

Note: Scotland, England and Wales all compete separately in international curling. By an agreement between the curling federations of those three home nations, only Scotland can score Olympic qualification points on behalf of Great Britain.

=== Standings ===
Key
Nations that have qualified for the Olympic Games via points
Nations that have qualified for the Olympic Games via Olympic qualification event

==== Men ====
Position	Country	2016	2017	Total
1	Canada	14	14	28
2	Sweden	7	12	19
3	United States	10	9	19
4	Japan	9	6	15
5	Switzerland	4	10	14
6	Great Britain	6	7	13
7	Norway	8	5	13
8	Denmark	12	0	12
9	China	0	8	8
10	Finland	5	0	5
11	Italy	0	4	4
12	Germany	1	3	4
13	Olympic Athletes from Russia	3	1	4
14	Netherlands	0	2	2
15	South Korea (host)	2	0	2
16	Czech Republic	0	0	0

- Nations listed with 0 points were competitors at the 2014 or 2015 world championships, and were eligible for the final qualification event.

==== Women ====
Position	Country	2016	2017	Total
1	Canada	9	14	23
2	Olympic Athletes from Russia	10	12	22
3	Switzerland	14	5	19
4	Great Britain	8	10	18
5	United States	7	8	15
6	Sweden	4	9	13
7	South Korea (host)	6	7	13
8	Japan	12	0	12
9	Germany	3	4	7
10	Czech Republic	0	6	6
11	Denmark	5	1	6
12	Italy	1	3	4
13	China	0	2	2
14	Finland	2	0	2
15	Latvia	0	0	0
15	Norway	0	0	0

- Nations listed with 0 points were competitors at the 2014 or 2015 world championships, and were eligible for the final qualification event.

==== Mixed doubles ====
Position	Country	2016	2017	Total
1	China	12	10	22
2	Canada	8	12	20
3	Olympic Athletes from Russia	14	4	18
4	Switzerland	0	14	14
5	United States	10	3	13
6	Norway	4	8	12
7	Finland	6	6	12
8	Great Britain	9	2	11
9	Czech Republic	0	9	9
10	South Korea (host)	0	7	7
11	Estonia	7	0	7
12	Latvia	0	5	5
13	Slovakia	3	0	3
14	Austria	2	0	2
15	Italy	0	1	1
16	Ireland	1	0	1

- England earned 5 points in 2016 but only Scotland can score Olympic qualification points on behalf of Great Britain.

== Qualification event ==
At the Olympic qualifying event, which was held 5–10 December 2017 in Plzeň, Czech Republic, the top two teams in the event qualified their nations to participate in the Olympics. The qualification event was open to any nations that earned qualification points at the 2016 or 2017 World Curling Championships (as listed above) or participated at the 2014 or 2015 World Curling Championships (the Czech men's team, the Norway and the Latvia women's team).

== National qualifying events ==
Some countries select their teams through trial qualification tournaments.

- (Canada) 2017 Canadian Olympic Curling Trials
- (Canada) 2018 Canadian Mixed Doubles Curling Olympic Trials
- 2017 United States Olympic Curling Trials
- 2017 United States Mixed Doubles Curling Olympic Trials
- (Switzerland) 2017 Swiss Olympic Curling Trials (women only)
- (Japan) 2017 Japanese Olympic Curling Trials (women only)
- (International Olympic Committee) 2017 Russian Olympic Curling Trials (women only)
