= 2022 Nornickel Curling Cup =

- Host city: Dudinka, Russia
- Arena: Taimyr Ice Arena
- Dates: May 26–29
- Winner: (Russia) Team Glukhov
- Curling club: Adamant CC, Saint Petersburg
- Skip: Sergey Glukhov
- Third: Evgeny Klimov
- Second: Dmitry Mironov
- Lead: Anton Kalalb
- Finalist: (Russia) Alexey Stukalskiy

The 2022 Nornickel Curling Cup, the sixth edition of the traditional World Curling Tour event, was held from May 26 to 29 at the Taimyr Ice Arena in Dudinka, Russia. For all the teams competing, it was their final event of the 2021–22 curling season.

The WCT Arctic Cup is usually a tour event that attracts teams from all over the world. However, due to the Russian invasion of Ukraine, the 2022 edition of the event was contested between six Russian teams, including members from Belarus and Italy, three men's and three women's. Leading the field were the two Russian Olympic teams that represented the ROC at the 2022 Winter Olympics, Sergey Glukhov and Alina Kovaleva. The women's Olympic team from the 2014 Winter Olympics was also brought back together to play in this event, skipped by Anna Sidorova, as well as the men's team skip Alexey Stukalskiy. Four Russian players, Alexander Krushelnitskiy, Alexey Timofeev, Kristina Dudko and Anna Samoylik played with international teammates from Italy (men's) and Belarus (women's).

== Summary ==
In the final, the Olympic men's team from 2022, consisting of Sergey Glukhov, Evgeny Klimov, Dmitry Mironov and Anton Kalalb won the title, defeating the Alexey Stukalskiy rink 7–6 in the final. After the game Glukhov said that "This year the tournament had an unusual format, I think that both guys and girls were interested in playing. The final came out tense. The game went to the last stone, there were a lot of difficult shots. Dudinka was the last tournament of the season. It's nice to win and go on vacation in a good mood, especially since the tournament did not start easily." Team Glukhov began the event losing their first two games to Anna Sidorova and Alexey Stukalskiy. On the brink of elimination, the team won three their last three games to qualify for the playoffs as the third seed. They reached the final with a 4–2 victory over Alina Kovaleva in the semifinal round. Team Stukalskiy took an easier route to the playoffs, beginning by winning four straight games. After a loss to the Sidorova rink in their final round robin game, they took revenge in the semifinal by defeating the Russian women's team 11–3.

In the third place game, the 2022 Russian Olympic women's team of Alina Kovaleva, Yulia Portunova, Galina Arsenkina, Ekaterina Kuzmina and Maria Komarova scored one in the final end to defeat the Sidorova rink 4–3. "We are delighted to have won this match for third place," said Kovaleva after the game. "I really like to come to Dudinka. There is always a warm welcome, excellent organization, spectacular opening and closing ceremonies. Here you will not see such shows anywhere, especially on curling." Team Kovaleva went 3–2 through the qualifying stage before dropping their semifinal game to the Stukalskiy rink. For Team Sidorova, which consisted of Anna Sidorova, Margarita Fomina, Nkeirouka Ezekh and Ekaterina Galkina, this was their first event playing together since disbanding at the end of the 2018–19 season. While they were together, the team won five medals at the World Women's Curling Championship, one silver and four bronze. They also won two European Championships in 2012 and 2015. Before the event began, Sidorova noted that she was happy to be reunited with her "golden squad." "For me, this is a special tournament, because we play in Dudinka with our golden squad. The very beginning of my career, my own awards and medals of our country at international competitions. Therefore, with great warmth and just love, we now go and pour out what has accumulated, how we missed, and enjoy spending time on the ice and beyond."

== Teams ==
The teams are listed as follows:

Skip	Third	Second	Lead	Alternate	Locale
Sergey Glukhov	Evgeny Klimov	Dmitry Mironov	Anton Kalalb		Saint Petersburg, Russia
Alina Kovaleva	Yulia Portunova	Galina Arsenkina	Ekaterina Kuzmina	Maria Komarova	Saint Petersburg, Russia
Lorenzo Piatti	Simone Sola	Alexander Krushelnitskiy	Alexey Timofeev		Turin, Italy / Saint Petersburg, Russia
Anna Sidorova	Margarita Fomina	Nkeirouka Ezekh	Ekaterina Galkina		Moscow, Russia
Alexey Stukalskiy	Artur Ali	Petr Dron	Daniil Goriachev	Alexander Eremin	Moscow, Russia
Tatsiana Tarsunova	Alena Ustsinovich	Kristina Dudko	Anna Samoylik		Minsk, Belarus / Krasnoyarsk, Russia

== Round-robin standings ==
Final round-robin standings

Key
Teams to Playoffs

Team	W	L	W–L	PF	PA	DSC
(Russia) Alexey Stukalskiy	4	1	–	37	23	78.71
(Russia) Alina Kovaleva	3	2	1–1	27	23	54.12
(Russia) Sergey Glukhov	3	2	1–1	31	21	55.93
(Russia) Anna Sidorova	3	2	1–1	38	26	67.60
(Italy) (Russia) Lorenzo Piatti	2	3	–	23	29	65.89
(Belarus) (Russia) Tatsiana Tarsunova	0	5	–	10	44	80.64

== Round-robin results ==
All draw times are listed in Krasnoyarsk Standard Time (UTC+07:00).

=== Draw 1 ===
Thursday, May 26, 16:00

Sheet A	1	2	3	4	5	6	7	8	Final
(Russia) Sergey Glukhov	1	0	0	2	0	1	0	X	4
(Russia) Anna Sidorova	0	1	2	0	2	0	2	X	7

Sheet B	1	2	3	4	5	6	7	8	Final
(Russia) Alina Kovaleva	0	0	1	1	1	0	2	0	5
(Russia) Alexey Stukalskiy	1	1	0	0	0	2	0	2	6

=== Draw 2 ===
Friday, May 27, 9:00

Sheet A	1	2	3	4	5	6	7	8	Final
(Russia) Alexey Stukalskiy	0	0	2	0	2	2	1	X	7
(Russia) Sergey Glukhov	0	1	0	1	0	0	0	X	2

Sheet B	1	2	3	4	5	6	7	8	Final
(Belarus) (Russia) Tatsiana Tarsunova	0	1	0	0	0	0	X	X	1
(Russia) Anna Sidorova	1	0	2	3	1	5	X	X	12

=== Draw 3 ===
Friday, May 27, 16:00

Sheet A	1	2	3	4	5	6	7	8	Final
(Russia) Alina Kovaleva	1	1	0	1	3	1	X	X	7
(Belarus) (Russia) Tatsiana Tarsunova	0	0	1	0	0	0	X	X	1

Sheet B	1	2	3	4	5	6	7	8	Final
(Russia) Alexey Stukalskiy	0	3	0	1	0	2	0	1	7
(Italy) (Russia) Lorenzo Piatti	0	0	1	0	1	0	2	0	4

=== Draw 4 ===
Friday, May 27, 19:00

Sheet A	1	2	3	4	5	6	7	8	9	Final
(Russia) Anna Sidorova	2	2	0	0	0	0	1	1	0	6
(Italy) (Russia) Lorenzo Piatti	0	0	1	1	2	2	0	0	1	7

Sheet B	1	2	3	4	5	6	7	8	Final
(Russia) Sergey Glukhov	3	4	1	0	3	0	X	X	11
(Belarus) (Russia) Tatsiana Tarsunova	0	0	0	1	0	1	X	X	2

=== Draw 5 ===
Saturday, May 28, 9:00

Sheet A	1	2	3	4	5	6	7	8	Final
(Italy) (Russia) Lorenzo Piatti	0	1	0	0	0	1	0	X	2
(Russia) Sergey Glukhov	2	0	0	2	1	0	2	X	7

=== Draw 6 ===
Saturday, May 28, 12:00

Sheet A	1	2	3	4	5	6	7	8	Final
(Belarus) (Russia) Tatsiana Tarsunova	0	0	2	0	1	0	0	X	3
(Russia) Alexey Stukalskiy	3	1	0	1	0	1	3	X	9

Sheet B	1	2	3	4	5	6	7	8	9	Final
(Russia) Anna Sidorova	0	1	0	0	1	0	0	2	0	4
(Russia) Alina Kovaleva	2	0	0	1	0	1	0	0	2	6

=== Draw 7 ===
Saturday, May 28, 16:00

Sheet A	1	2	3	4	5	6	7	8	Final
(Russia) Anna Sidorova	1	0	5	0	0	2	0	1	9
(Russia) Alexey Stukalskiy	0	1	0	4	1	0	2	0	8

Sheet B	1	2	3	4	5	6	7	8	Final
(Italy) (Russia) Lorenzo Piatti	0	1	2	0	1	0	1	0	5
(Russia) Alina Kovaleva	1	0	0	1	0	2	0	2	6

=== Draw 8 ===
Saturday, May 28, 19:00

Sheet A	1	2	3	4	5	6	7	8	Final
(Belarus) (Russia) Tatsiana Tarsunova	1	0	0	0	1	0	1	X	3
(Italy) (Russia) Lorenzo Piatti	0	3	2	0	0	0	0	X	5

Sheet B	1	2	3	4	5	6	7	8	Final
(Russia) Alina Kovaleva	1	0	2	0	0	0	0	0	3
(Russia) Sergey Glukhov	0	2	0	0	0	2	0	3	7

== Playoffs ==
Semifinals
1	(Russia) Alexey Stukalskiy	11
4	(Russia) Anna Sidorova	3
2	(Russia) Alina Kovaleva	2
3	(Russia) Sergey Glukhov	4

Final
1	(Russia) Alexey Stukalskiy	6
3	(Russia) Sergey Glukhov	7

Third place game
4	(Russia) Anna Sidorova	3
2	(Russia) Alina Kovaleva	4

=== Semifinals ===
Sunday, May 29, 10:00

Sheet A	1	2	3	4	5	6	7	8	Final
(Russia) Alexey Stukalskiy	1	1	0	0	3	1	5	X	11
(Russia) Anna Sidorova	0	0	2	1	0	0	0	X	3

Sheet B	1	2	3	4	5	6	7	8	Final
(Russia) Alina Kovaleva	0	0	1	0	0	0	0	1	2
(Russia) Sergey Glukhov	0	2	0	1	0	1	0	0	4

=== Third place game ===
Sunday, May 29, 14:00

Sheet B	1	2	3	4	5	6	7	8	Final
(Russia) Anna Sidorova	0	2	0	0	1	0	0	0	3
(Russia) Alina Kovaleva	1	0	2	0	0	0	0	1	4

=== Final ===
Sunday, May 29, 14:00

Sheet A	1	2	3	4	5	6	7	8	Final
(Russia) Alexey Stukalskiy	1	0	0	2	1	0	2	0	6
(Russia) Sergey Glukhov	0	3	0	0	0	2	0	2	7
