= Syder =

Syder may refer to:

== Name ==
=== As a given name ===
- Syder Nnodim (fl.1992–1993), Nigerian politician

=== As a surname ===
- Branca de Gonta Colaço (1880–1945), Portuguese writer whose full name is Branca Eva de Gonta Syder Ribeiro Colaço
- Daniel Syder (c. 1642/1647–1705), Italian painter
- Jim Syder Jr. (1911–1972), English greyhound trainer
- Jim Syder Sr. (1880–1945), English greyhound trainer and father of Jim Syder Jr.
- Martim Syder (born 1995), Portuguese politician

== Places ==
- Sierre, a municipality in Valais, Switzerland, that was formerly known as Syder

== See also ==
- Cider
- Sider
- Snyder (surname)
- Sydor
