= Sidor =

Sidor is a surname and a given name. Surnames derived from the given name: Sidorov, Sidorenko. Notable people with the name include:

== Given name ==
Sidor is a Russian-language equivalent of the given name Isidore.

- Sidor Belarsky, American opera singer, educator and interpreter
- Sidor Slyusarev, Lieutenant general in the Soviet Air Force
- Sidor Shibaev, Russian entrepreneur, one of the first oil industrialists

== Surname ==
- Andrzej Sidor, Polish physician and politician
- Christian Sidor (fl. 1994–2005), paleontologist
- David Albin Zywiec Sidor (1947–2020), American-Nicaraguan Catholic bishop
- Ignatiy Sidor, Belarusian footballer
- Karol Sidor (1901–1953), Slovak politician
- Kazimierz Sidor (1915–1981), Polish politician and diplomat
- Lech Sidor, Polish tennis player and sports journalist

== See also ==
- SIDOR, Venezuelan steel corporation
- Sydir
- Sydor
