= 2017 Russian Olympic curling trials =

2017 Russian Olympic Curling Trials
- Host city: Sochi, Russia
- Arena: Ice Cube Curling Center
- Dates: December 27–29
- Winner: (Saint Petersburg) Victoria Moiseeva
- Curling club: CC Adamant
- Skip: Victoria Moiseeva
- Third: Uliana Vasilyeva
- Second: Galina Arsenkina
- Lead: Julia Guzieva
- Alternate: Yulia Portunova
- Finalist: (Moscow) Anna Sidorova

The 2017 Russian Curling Olympic Trials were held from December 27 to 29 at the Ice Cube Curling Center in Sochi. The winner of this event, which was determined by a "best of seven" series, represented the Olympic Athletes from Russia team at the 2018 Winter Olympics. There was only a women's event, as the men's team representing Russia at the qualification event failed to qualify for the Olympics, and the mixed doubles team was already chosen.

The team skipped by Victoria Moiseeva won the event 4-1 over the team skipped by Anna Sidorova.

== Teams ==
Locale	Skip	Third	Second	Lead	Alternate	Coach
Moskvitch CC, Moscow	Anna Sidorova	Margarita Fomina	Alexandra Raeva	Nkeirouka Ezekh	Alina Kovaleva	Svetlana Kalalb, Rodger Gustaf Schmidt
(Saint Petersburg) CC Adamant, St. Petersburg	Victoria Moiseeva	Uliana Vasilyeva	Galina Arsenkina	Julia Guzieva	Yulia Portunova	Sergey Belanov, Irina Kolesnikova

== Results ==
All draw times are listed in Moscow Time (UTC+03:00).

=== Final standings ===
Skip	W	L	PF	PA	Ends Won	Ends Lost	Blank Ends	Stolen Ends
(Saint Petersburg) Victoria Moiseeva	4	1	38	32	23	22	1	5
(Moscow) Anna Sidorova	1	4	32	38	22	23	2	3

=== Draw 1 ===
December 27, 8:30

Sheet A	1	2	3	4	5	6	7	8	9	10	Final
(Moscow) Anna Sidorova	1	0	1	0	2	0	1	0	1	X	6
(Saint Petersburg) Victoria Moiseeva	0	3	0	2	0	1	0	3	0	X	9

=== Draw 2 ===
December 27, 18:30

Team	1	2	3	4	5	6	7	8	9	10	Final
(Moscow) Anna Sidorova	0	0	1	0	3	0	1	0	0	1	6
(Saint Petersburg) Victoria Moiseeva	0	2	0	1	0	2	0	1	1	0	7

=== Draw 3 ===
December 28, 8:30

Team	1	2	3	4	5	6	7	8	9	10	Final
(Moscow) Anna Sidorova	1	0	0	0	2	0	3	0	1	2	9
(Saint Petersburg) Victoria Moiseeva	0	1	0	1	0	1	0	2	0	0	5

=== Draw 4 ===
December 28, 18:30

Team	1	2	3	4	5	6	7	8	9	10	Final
(Moscow) Anna Sidorova	0	1	0	1	0	3	0	1	0	X	6
(Saint Petersburg) Victoria Moiseeva	3	0	1	0	1	0	2	0	2	X	9

=== Draw 5 ===
December 29, 8:30

Team	1	2	3	4	5	6	7	8	9	10	Final
(Moscow) Anna Sidorova	1	0	0	0	1	0	0	2	1	0	5
(Saint Petersburg) Victoria Moiseeva	0	2	1	2	0	1	0	0	0	2	8

== Video ==
Video broadcasting are on official "Russian Curling TV" channel on YouTube.

- Draw 1 on YouTube (December 27, 08:30 UTC+3)
- Draw 2 on YouTube (December 27, 18:30 UTC+3)
- Draw 3 on YouTube (December 28, 08:30 UTC+3)
- Draw 4 on YouTube (December 28, 18:30 UTC+3)
- Draw 5 on YouTube (December 29, 08:30 UTC+3)
