= Olga Sidorova =

Olga Sidorova may mean

- Olga Sharkova-Sidorova (born 1968), a Russian fencer
- Olga Sidorova (trapezist) (born 1974), a Russian circus performer, now teaching in Australia
