= 2021 European Curling Championships =

2021 Le Gruyère AOP European Curling Championships
- Host city: Lillehammer, Norway (A & B divisions); Geneva, Switzerland (C division)
- Dates: November 20–27 (A & B divisions); September 12–17 (C division)
- Men's winner: Scotland
- Curling club: Gogar Park CC, Edinburgh
- Skip: Bruce Mouat
- Third: Grant Hardie
- Second: Bobby Lammie
- Lead: Hammy McMillan Jr.
- Alternate: Ross Whyte
- Coach: Alan Hannah
- Finalist: Sweden (Edin)
- Women's winner: Scotland
- Curling club: National Curling Academy, Stirling
- Skip: Eve Muirhead
- Third: Vicky Wright
- Second: Jennifer Dodds
- Lead: Hailey Duff
- Alternate: Mili Smith
- Coach: Kristian Lindström
- Finalist: Sweden (Hasselborg)

The 2021 European Curling Championships were held in September and November 2021, to qualify European curling teams for the 2022 World Curling Championships and World Qualification Event. The A and B division competitions were held from November 20 to 27 in Lillehammer, Norway. The C division competition was held from September 12 to 17 in Geneva, Switzerland.

The top eight men's teams qualified for the 2022 World Men's Curling Championship. The host of the qualifier (Finland) and the remaining team in the A division as well as the top three teams in the B division qualified for the 2022 World Qualification Event.

The top seven women's teams qualified for the 2022 World Women's Curling Championship. The next two teams in the A division and top two teams in the B division, not including the hosts, Finland, who automatically qualify, qualified for the 2022 World Qualification Event.

== Medalists ==
A Division	Gold	Silver	Bronze
Men	Scotland; Bruce Mouat; Grant Hardie; Bobby Lammie; Hammy McMillan Jr. Ross Whyte	Sweden; Niklas Edin; Oskar Eriksson; Rasmus Wranå; Christoffer Sundgren; Daniel Magnusson	Italy; Joël Retornaz; Amos Mosaner; Sebastiano Arman; Simone Gonin; Mattia Giovanella
Women	Scotland; Eve Muirhead; Vicky Wright; Jennifer Dodds; Hailey Duff; Mili Smith	Sweden; Anna Hasselborg; Sara McManus; Agnes Knochenhauer; Sofia Mabergs; Johanna Heldin	Germany; Daniela Jentsch; Emira Abbes; Mia Höhne; Analena Jentsch; Klara-Hermine Fomm

== Men ==
=== A division ===
==== Teams ====
The teams are listed as follows:

A Division Teams

Czech Republic	Denmark	Finland	Germany	Italy
Skip: Lukáš Klíma; Third: Marek Černovský; Second: Radek Boháč; Lead: Jiří Candra; Alternate: Samuel Mokriš	Skip: Mikkel Krause; Third: Mads Nørgård; Second: Henrik Holtermann; Lead: Kasper Wiksten; Alternate: Tobias Thune	Skip: Kalle Kiiskinen; Third: Teemu Salo; Second: Leo Ouni; Lead: Paavo Kuosmanen; Alternate: Jermu Pöllänen	Skip: Sixten Totzek; Third: Marc Muskatewitz; Second: Joshua Sutor; Lead: Dominik Greindl; Alternate: Magnus Sutor	Skip: Joël Retornaz; Third: Amos Mosaner; Second: Sebastiano Arman; Lead: Simone Gonin; Alternate: Mattia Giovanella
Netherlands	Norway	Scotland	Sweden	Switzerland
Skip: Wouter Gösgens; Third: Jaap van Dorp; Second: Laurens Hoekman; Lead: Carlo Glasbergen; Alternate: Tobias van den Hurk	Skip: Steffen Walstad; Third: Torger Nergård; Second: Markus Høiberg; Lead: Magnus Vågberg; Alternate: Magnus Nedregotten	Skip: Bruce Mouat; Third: Grant Hardie; Second: Bobby Lammie; Lead: Hammy McMillan Jr. Alternate: Ross Whyte	Skip: Niklas Edin; Third: Oskar Eriksson; Second: Rasmus Wranå; Lead: Christoffer Sundgren; Alternate: Daniel Magnusson	Fourth: Benoît Schwarz; Third: Sven Michel; Skip: Peter de Cruz; Lead: Valentin Tanner; Alternate: Pablo Lachat

==== Round-robin standings ====
Final round-robin standings

Key
Teams to Playoffs and Qualified for the 2022 World Men's Curling Championship
Teams Qualified for the 2022 World Men's Curling Championship
Teams Relegated to 2022 Division B but qualified for 2022 World Qualification Event

Country	Skip	W	L	W–L	PF	PA	EW	EL	BE	SE	S%	DSC
Scotland	Bruce Mouat	9	0	–	72	30	42	21	1	17	87%	15.24
Sweden	Niklas Edin	7	2	–	58	40	35	29	4	9	89%	9.59
Italy	Joël Retornaz	6	3	–	64	41	35	31	8	8	84%	30.07
Norway	Steffen Walstad	5	4	1–0	55	52	40	35	3	12	82%	36.04
Switzerland	Peter de Cruz	5	4	0–1	51	47	35	31	8	8	85%	20.38
Denmark	Mikkel Krause	4	5	1–0	51	64	32	38	4	3	76%	37.69
Czech Republic	Lukáš Klíma	4	5	0–1	57	62	36	39	5	6	76%	29.33
Germany	Sixten Totzek	3	6	–	51	69	33	42	3	5	82%	33.15
Netherlands	Wouter Gösgens	1	8	1–0	38	67	28	38	6	5	79%	37.22
Finland	Kalle Kiiskinen	1	8	0–1	40	65	29	41	4	3	71%	40.49

Round Robin Summary Table
Pos.	Country	Czech Republic	Denmark	Finland	Germany	Italy	Netherlands	Norway	Scotland	Sweden	Switzerland	Record
7	Czech Republic	—N/a	4–5	10–8	8–9	5–7	7–5	10–6	5–10	2–8	6–4	4–5
6	Denmark	5–4	—	9–3	6–8	1–9	9–5	6–5	8–9	5–9	2–12	4–5
10	Finland	8–10	3–9	—	8–3	3–8	6–7	4–9	2–6	1–7	5–6	1–8
8	Germany	9–8	8–6	3–8	—	5–11	5–3	4–7	5–10	6–9	6–7	3–6
3	Italy	7–5	9–1	8–3	11–5	—	10–4	6–9	2–7	7–2	4–5	6–3
9	Netherlands	5–7	5–9	7–6	3–5	4–10	—	2–5	2–9	7–8	3–8	1–8
4	Norway	6–10	5–6	9–4	7–4	9–6	5–2	—	3–8	4–6	7–6	5–4
1	Scotland	10–5	9–8	6–2	10–5	7–2	9–2	8–3	—	6–2	7–1	9–0
2	Sweden	8–2	9–5	7–1	9–6	2–7	8–7	6–4	2–6	—	7–2	7–2
5	Switzerland	4–6	12–2	6–5	7–6	5–4	8–3	6–7	1–7	2–7	—	5–4

==== Round-robin results ====
All draw times are listed in Central European Time (UTC+01:00).

===== Draw 1 =====
Saturday, November 20, 14:00

Sheet A	1	2	3	4	5	6	7	8	9	10	Final
Finland (Kiiskinen) 🔨	1	1	1	0	1	0	0	4	X	X	8
Germany (Totzek)	0	0	0	1	0	1	1	0	X	X	3

Sheet B	1	2	3	4	5	6	7	8	9	10	Final
Norway (Walstad) 🔨	1	0	1	0	2	0	1	0	0	2	7
Switzerland (de Cruz)	0	1	0	1	0	1	0	2	1	0	6

Sheet C	1	2	3	4	5	6	7	8	9	10	Final
Italy (Retornaz) 🔨	0	3	2	2	0	2	X	X	X	X	9
Denmark (Krause)	0	0	0	0	1	0	X	X	X	X	1

Sheet D	1	2	3	4	5	6	7	8	9	10	Final
Czech Republic (Klíma) 🔨	0	0	1	0	2	0	2	1	0	1	7
Netherlands (Gösgens)	0	1	0	1	0	3	0	0	0	0	5

Sheet E	1	2	3	4	5	6	7	8	9	10	Final
Scotland (Mouat) 🔨	0	2	1	0	2	1	0	X	X	X	6
Sweden (Edin)	0	0	0	1	0	0	1	X	X	X	2

===== Draw 2 =====
Sunday, November 21, 9:00

Sheet A	1	2	3	4	5	6	7	8	9	10	Final
Switzerland (de Cruz)	0	1	0	0	0	1	0	1	1	0	4
Czech Republic (Klíma) 🔨	2	0	2	0	0	0	1	0	0	1	6

Sheet B	1	2	3	4	5	6	7	8	9	10	Final
Germany (Totzek) 🔨	1	2	0	0	0	1	1	0	0	X	5
Netherlands (Gösgens)	0	0	1	0	0	0	0	1	1	X	3

Sheet C	1	2	3	4	5	6	7	8	9	10	Final
Scotland (Mouat) 🔨	1	1	0	2	0	2	0	0	X	X	6
Finland (Kiiskinen)	0	0	0	0	1	0	0	1	X	X	2

Sheet D	1	2	3	4	5	6	7	8	9	10	Final
Sweden (Edin) 🔨	1	0	2	1	0	0	1	0	4	X	9
Denmark (Krause)	0	2	0	0	1	1	0	1	0	X	5

Sheet E	1	2	3	4	5	6	7	8	9	10	Final
Norway (Walstad) 🔨	2	0	2	1	0	0	1	0	2	1	9
Italy (Retornaz)	0	2	0	0	1	1	0	2	0	0	6

===== Draw 3 =====
Sunday, November 21, 19:00

Sheet A	1	2	3	4	5	6	7	8	9	10	11	Final
Denmark (Krause) 🔨	0	1	0	1	0	0	3	0	0	0	1	6
Norway (Walstad)	0	0	1	0	1	1	0	1	1	0	0	5

Sheet B	1	2	3	4	5	6	7	8	9	10	Final
Finland (Kiiskinen)	0	0	0	0	1	0	X	X	X	X	1
Sweden (Edin) 🔨	1	1	1	1	0	3	X	X	X	X	7

Sheet C	1	2	3	4	5	6	7	8	9	10	Final
Germany (Totzek)	1	0	1	0	2	0	4	0	0	1	9
Czech Republic (Klíma) 🔨	0	3	0	2	0	1	0	1	1	0	8

Sheet D	1	2	3	4	5	6	7	8	9	10	Final
Italy (Retornaz) 🔨	1	0	0	0	1	0	0	X	X	X	2
Scotland (Mouat)	0	3	1	1	0	1	1	X	X	X	7

Sheet E	1	2	3	4	5	6	7	8	9	10	Final
Switzerland (de Cruz) 🔨	0	2	0	2	0	1	1	0	2	X	8
Netherlands (Gösgens)	0	0	2	0	0	0	0	1	0	X	3

===== Draw 4 =====
Monday, November 22, 12:00

Sheet A	1	2	3	4	5	6	7	8	9	10	Final
Netherlands (Gösgens)	0	1	0	1	0	0	X	X	X	X	2
Scotland (Mouat) 🔨	4	0	1	0	1	3	X	X	X	X	9

Sheet B	1	2	3	4	5	6	7	8	9	10	Final
Italy (Retornaz)	0	1	0	2	0	1	0	2	0	1	7
Czech Republic (Klíma) 🔨	0	0	1	0	2	0	1	0	1	0	5

Sheet C	1	2	3	4	5	6	7	8	9	10	Final
Sweden (Edin) 🔨	1	0	0	0	2	2	0	2	X	X	7
Switzerland (de Cruz)	0	0	0	1	0	0	1	0	X	X	2

Sheet D	1	2	3	4	5	6	7	8	9	10	Final
Denmark (Krause) 🔨	2	0	1	0	2	0	4	X	X	X	9
Finland (Kiiskinen)	0	1	0	1	0	1	0	X	X	X	3

Sheet E	1	2	3	4	5	6	7	8	9	10	Final
Germany (Totzek)	0	0	0	2	0	0	1	1	0	0	4
Norway (Walstad) 🔨	0	2	1	0	0	2	0	0	1	1	7

===== Draw 5 =====
Monday, November 22, 20:00

Sheet A	1	2	3	4	5	6	7	8	9	10	Final
Italy (Retornaz)	0	0	2	0	0	0	0	0	2	0	4
Switzerland (de Cruz) 🔨	1	0	0	2	0	0	1	0	0	1	5

Sheet B	1	2	3	4	5	6	7	8	9	10	Final
Scotland (Mouat) 🔨	2	1	1	0	2	0	1	3	X	X	10
Germany (Totzek)	0	0	0	2	0	3	0	0	X	X	5

Sheet C	1	2	3	4	5	6	7	8	9	10	Final
Finland (Kiiskinen)	0	1	3	0	1	0	0	0	1	0	6
Netherlands (Gösgens) 🔨	2	0	0	1	0	1	2	0	0	1	7

Sheet D	1	2	3	4	5	6	7	8	9	10	Final
Norway (Walstad)	0	0	1	0	0	0	0	2	0	1	4
Sweden (Edin) 🔨	0	1	0	0	0	3	1	0	1	0	6

Sheet E	1	2	3	4	5	6	7	8	9	10	11	Final
Czech Republic (Klíma)	0	1	0	1	0	0	0	1	0	1	0	4
Denmark (Krause) 🔨	1	0	1	0	1	0	0	0	1	0	1	5

===== Draw 6 =====
Tuesday, November 23, 14:00

Sheet A	1	2	3	4	5	6	7	8	9	10	Final
Scotland (Mouat) 🔨	1	0	1	0	2	0	2	3	0	0	9
Denmark (Krause)	0	2	0	1	0	2	0	0	2	1	8

Sheet B	1	2	3	4	5	6	7	8	9	10	Final
Switzerland (de Cruz) 🔨	2	0	0	1	0	2	0	1	0	0	6
Finland (Kiiskinen)	0	1	0	0	2	0	1	0	0	1	5

Sheet C	1	2	3	4	5	6	7	8	9	10	Final
Czech Republic (Klíma) 🔨	0	2	1	0	0	3	0	0	2	2	10
Norway (Walstad)	0	0	0	2	1	0	2	1	0	0	6

Sheet D	1	2	3	4	5	6	7	8	9	10	Final
Netherlands (Gösgens)	0	2	0	1	0	0	1	0	X	X	4
Italy (Retornaz) 🔨	4	0	2	0	1	1	0	2	X	X	10

Sheet E	1	2	3	4	5	6	7	8	9	10	Final
Sweden (Edin) 🔨	2	0	2	0	2	2	0	1	0	X	9
Germany (Totzek)	0	2	0	1	0	0	2	0	1	X	6

===== Draw 7 =====
Wednesday, November 24, 9:00

Sheet A	1	2	3	4	5	6	7	8	9	10	Final
Norway (Walstad) 🔨	0	2	2	0	0	0	0	1	0	X	5
Netherlands (Gösgens)	0	0	0	0	0	0	1	0	1	X	2

Sheet B	1	2	3	4	5	6	7	8	9	10	Final
Sweden (Edin)	0	0	1	0	0	1	0	X	X	X	2
Italy (Retornaz) 🔨	0	2	0	1	1	0	3	X	X	X	7

Sheet C	1	2	3	4	5	6	7	8	9	10	Final
Denmark (Krause) 🔨	2	0	1	0	1	0	2	0	0	X	6
Germany (Totzek)	0	2	0	2	0	2	0	0	2	X	8

Sheet D	1	2	3	4	5	6	7	8	9	10	Final
Scotland (Mouat) 🔨	2	0	1	0	3	1	X	X	X	X	7
Switzerland (de Cruz)	0	0	0	1	0	0	X	X	X	X	1

Sheet E	1	2	3	4	5	6	7	8	9	10	Final
Finland (Kiiskinen)	0	2	0	3	0	2	0	0	1	X	8
Czech Republic (Klíma) 🔨	1	0	2	0	2	0	3	2	0	X	10

===== Draw 8 =====
Wednesday, November 24, 19:00

Sheet A	1	2	3	4	5	6	7	8	9	10	Final
Germany (Totzek)	0	0	3	0	1	0	1	0	0	X	5
Italy (Retornaz) 🔨	0	3	0	2	0	2	0	0	4	X	11

Sheet B	1	2	3	4	5	6	7	8	9	10	Final
Czech Republic (Klíma)	0	2	0	0	0	3	0	X	X	X	5
Scotland (Mouat) 🔨	2	0	3	2	2	0	1	X	X	X	10

Sheet C	1	2	3	4	5	6	7	8	9	10	Final
Netherlands (Gösgens)	0	1	0	0	0	2	1	0	2	1	7
Sweden (Edin) 🔨	2	0	0	3	2	0	0	1	0	0	8

Sheet D	1	2	3	4	5	6	7	8	9	10	Final
Finland (Kiiskinen) 🔨	1	0	0	2	0	0	1	0	0	X	4
Norway (Walstad)	0	2	1	0	3	1	0	1	1	X	9

Sheet E	1	2	3	4	5	6	7	8	9	10	Final
Denmark (Krause)	0	2	0	0	0	0	X	X	X	X	2
Switzerland (de Cruz) 🔨	1	0	3	1	5	2	X	X	X	X	12

===== Draw 9 =====
Thursday, November 25, 12:00

Sheet A	1	2	3	4	5	6	7	8	9	10	Final
Czech Republic (Klíma)	0	0	1	0	1	0	X	X	X	X	2
Sweden (Edin) 🔨	3	2	0	1	0	2	X	X	X	X	8

Sheet B	1	2	3	4	5	6	7	8	9	10	Final
Netherlands (Gösgens) 🔨	0	2	0	0	0	2	0	1	0	0	5
Denmark (Krause)	0	0	0	0	3	0	1	0	3	2	9

Sheet C	1	2	3	4	5	6	7	8	9	10	Final
Norway (Walstad)	0	0	1	0	1	0	1	0	X	X	3
Scotland (Mouat) 🔨	1	2	0	1	0	1	0	3	X	X	8

Sheet D	1	2	3	4	5	6	7	8	9	10	11	Final
Switzerland (de Cruz)	0	0	2	0	1	0	2	0	1	0	1	7
Germany (Totzek) 🔨	1	0	0	2	0	1	0	1	0	1	0	6

Sheet E	1	2	3	4	5	6	7	8	9	10	Final
Italy (Retornaz)	0	2	0	1	0	2	1	2	X	X	8
Finland (Kiiskinen) 🔨	1	0	1	0	1	0	0	0	X	X	3

==== Playoffs ====
Semifinals
1	Scotland	9
4	Norway	3
2	Sweden	6
3	Italy	3

Gold medal game
1	Scotland	8
2	Sweden	5
Bronze medal game
4	Norway	4
3	Italy	10

===== Semifinal 1 =====
Friday, November 26, 9:00

Sheet C	1	2	3	4	5	6	7	8	9	10	Final
Sweden (Edin) 🔨	0	1	0	0	1	0	0	0	2	2	6
Italy (Retornaz)	0	0	0	2	0	0	1	0	0	0	3

Player percentages
Sweden		Italy	
Christoffer Sundgren	96%	Simone Gonin	91%
Rasmus Wranå	78%	Sebastiano Arman	79%
Oskar Eriksson	88%	Amos Mosaner	83%
Niklas Edin	93%	Joël Retornaz	86%
Total	88%	Total	84%

===== Semifinal 2 =====
Friday, November 26, 13:30

Sheet C	1	2	3	4	5	6	7	8	9	10	Final
Scotland (Mouat) 🔨	3	0	1	2	0	2	0	1	X	X	9
Norway (Walstad)	0	1	0	0	1	0	1	0	X	X	3

Player percentages
Scotland		Norway	
Hammy McMillan Jr.	92%	Magnus Vågberg	94%
Bobby Lammie	92%	Markus Høiberg	83%
Grant Hardie	95%	Torger Nergård	70%
Bruce Mouat	92%	Steffen Walstad	67%
Total	93%	Total	79%

===== Bronze medal game =====
Saturday, November 27, 9:00

Sheet C	1	2	3	4	5	6	7	8	9	10	Final
Norway (Walstad)	0	1	0	2	0	0	0	1	X	X	4
Italy (Retornaz) 🔨	2	0	3	0	3	1	1	0	X	X	10

Player percentages
Norway		Italy	
Magnus Vågberg	94%	Simone Gonin	80%
Markus Høiberg	78%	Sebastiano Arman	72%
Torger Nergård	78%	Amos Mosaner	84%
Steffen Walstad	59%	Joël Retornaz	98%
Total	77%	Total	84%

===== Gold medal game =====
Saturday, November 27, 17:00

Sheet C	1	2	3	4	5	6	7	8	9	10	Final
Scotland (Mouat) 🔨	1	0	1	2	2	0	2	0	0	X	8
Sweden (Edin)	0	2	0	0	0	2	0	0	1	X	5

Player percentages
Scotland		Sweden	
Hammy McMillan Jr.	94%	Christoffer Sundgren	96%
Bobby Lammie	82%	Rasmus Wranå	89%
Grant Hardie	72%	Oskar Eriksson	63%
Bruce Mouat	85%	Niklas Edin	76%
Total	83%	Total	81%

==== Player percentages ====
Round Robin only

Leads	%
(Scotland) Hammy McMillan Jr.	93.6
(Sweden) Christoffer Sundgren	92.4
(Switzerland) Valentin Tanner	91.1
(Norway) Magnus Vågberg	89.2
(Italy) Simone Gonin	88.0

Seconds	%
(Switzerland) Peter de Cruz	86.6
(Sweden) Rasmus Wranå	85.7
(Italy) Sebastiano Arman	82.8
(Scotland) Bobby Lammie	82.6
(Germany) Joshua Sutor	80.6

Thirds	%
(Sweden) Oskar Eriksson	88.6
(Scotland) Grant Hardie	87.3
(Italy) Amos Mosaner	82.2
(Norway) Torger Nergård	81.0
(Denmark) Mads Nørgård	80.8

Skips/Fourths	%
(Sweden) Niklas Edin	87.7
(Italy) Joël Retornaz	84.4
(Scotland) Bruce Mouat	84.3
(Switzerland) Benoît Schwarz	83.1
(Norway) Steffen Walstad	80.9

==== Final standings ====
Key
Teams Advance to the 2022 World Men's Curling Championship
Team Relegated to 2022 Division B but qualified for 2022 World Qualification Event

Place	Team
1st place, gold medalist(s)	Scotland
2nd place, silver medalist(s)	Sweden
3rd place, bronze medalist(s)	Italy
4	Norway
5	Switzerland
6	Denmark
7	Czech Republic
8	Germany
9	Netherlands
10	Finland

=== B division ===
==== Teams ====
The teams are listed as follows:

Austria	Belarus	Belgium	Bulgaria
Skip: Mathias Genner; Third: Jonas Backofen; Second: Martin Reichel; Lead: Lukas Kirchmair; Alternate: Matthäus Hofer	Skip: Dmitriy Barkan; Third: Dzmitry Rudnitski; Second: Mikalai Kryshtopa; Lead: Aleksej Chubarov	Fourth: Jeroen Spruyt; Skip: Timo Verreycken; Second: Daan Yskout; Lead: Bram Van Looy	Skip: Reto Seiler; Third: Bojidar Momerin; Second: Stoil Georgiev; Lead: Stanimir Petrov; Alternate: Nikolay Runtov
England	Estonia	France	Hungary
Skip: Andrew Woolston; Third: Andrew Reed; Second: Scott Gibson; Lead: James Whittle; Alternate: Thomas Jaeggi	Fourth: Mihhail Vlassov; Skip: Eduard Veltsman; Second: Janis Kiziridi; Lead: Igor Dzenzeljuk; Alternate: Konstantin Dotsenko	Fourth: Quentin Morard; Skip: Eddy Mercier; Second: Leo Tuaz; Lead: Killian Gaudin; Alternate: Yannick Valvassori	Fourth: Balázs Fóti; Skip: Gábor Észöl; Second: Támas Szabad; Lead: Balázs Varga; Alternate: Tamás Vaspöri
Latvia	Lithuania	Russia	Slovakia
Skip: Mārtiņš Trukšāns; Third: Jānis Klīve; Second: Aivars Avotiņš; Lead: Sandris Buholcs; Alternate: Robert Reinis Buncis	Skip: Konstantin Rykov; Third: Arunas Skrolis; Second: Paulius Kamarauskas; Lead: Donatas Kiudys; Alternate: Nedas Ivanauskas	Skip: Sergey Glukhov; Third: Evgeny Klimov; Second: Dmitry Mironov; Lead: Anton Kalalb; Alternate: Daniil Goriachev	Fourth: Patrik Kapralik; Third: Jakub Polak; Skip: Juraj Gallo; Lead: Peter Pitoňák; Alternate: Robert Masaryk
Slovenia	Spain	Turkey	Wales
Skip: Jure Čulić; Third: Gašper Uršič; Second: Jošt Lajovec; Lead: Gregor Verbinc; Alternate: Tomas Tišler	Skip: Sergio Vez; Third: Luis Gómez; Second: Eduardo de Paz; Lead: Nicholas Shaw; Alternate: Angel García	Skip: Uğurcan Karagöz; Third: Oğuzhan Karakurt; Second: Muhammed Zeki Uçan; Lead: Orhun Yüce; Alternate: Muhammet Haydar Demirel	Skip: James Pougher; Third: Rhys Phillips; Second: Garry Coombs; Lead: Simon Pougher; Alternate: Martin Lloyd

==== Round-robin standings ====
Final round-robin standings

Key
Teams to Playoffs
Teams to Relegation Playoff

Group A	Skip	W	L	W–L	DSC
Turkey	Uğurcan Karagöz	6	1	–	62.48
Austria	Mathias Genner	5	2	–	49.81
Wales	James Pougher	4	3	1–0	40.88
England	Andrew Woolston	4	3	0–1	54.15
France	Eddy Mercier	3	4	1–0	51.91
Slovakia	Juraj Gallo	3	4	0–1	76.28
Slovenia	Jure Čulić	2	5	–	64.39
Bulgaria	Reto Seiler	1	6	–	90.37

Group B	Skip	W	L	W–L	DSC
Russia	Sergey Glukhov	7	0	–	44.43
Spain	Sergio Vez	6	1	–	41.58
Latvia	Mārtiņš Trukšāns	4	3	1–0	47.15
Estonia	Eduard Veltsman	4	3	0–1	59.57
Hungary	Gábor Észöl	3	4	–	35.08
Belgium	Timo Verreycken	2	5	–	89.57
Belarus	Dmitriy Barkan	1	6	1–0	69.79
Lithuania	Konstantin Rykov	1	6	0–1	63.37

Group A Round Robin Summary Table
Pos.	Country	Austria	Bulgaria	England	France	Slovakia	Slovenia	Turkey	Wales	Record
2	Austria	—	8–3	8–9	4–3	5–2	7–3	2–10	9–4	5–2
8	Bulgaria	3–8	—	2–8	6–7	6–4	5–8	1–11	3–7	1–6
4	England	9–8	8–2	—	8–3	5–9	7–10	7–6	4–9	4–3
5	France	3–4	7–6	3–8	—	6–4	8–1	3–8	4–5	3–4
6	Slovakia	2–5	4–6	9–5	4–6	—	10–4	3–8	9–5	3–4
7	Slovenia	3–7	8–5	10–7	1–8	4–10	—	3–6	1–9	2–5
1	Turkey	10–2	11–1	6–7	8–3	8–3	6–3	—	10–7	6–1
3	Wales	4–9	7–3	9–4	5–4	5–9	9–1	7–10	—	4–3

Group B Round Robin Summary Table
Pos.	Country	Belarus	Belgium	Estonia	Hungary	Latvia	Lithuania	Russia	Spain	Record
7	Belarus	—	1–9	6–9	5–8	4–7	8–5	4–10	6–10	1–6
6	Belgium	9–1	—	6–9	3–7	1–7	10–6	6–9	3–7	2–5
4	Estonia	9–6	9–6	—	9–2	7–8	8–6	3–11	2–7	4–3
5	Hungary	8–5	7–3	2–9	—	6–11	11–8	3–9	6–7	3–4
3	Latvia	7–4	7–1	8–7	11–6	—	4–8	4–8	3–8	4–3
8	Lithuania	5–8	6–10	6–8	8–11	8–4	—	2–8	4–11	1–6
1	Russia	10–4	9–6	11–3	9–3	8–4	8–2	—	10–6	7–0
2	Spain	10–6	7–3	7–2	7–6	8–3	11–4	6–10	—	6–1

==== Relegation round ====
Relegation Semi-finals
A7	Slovenia	6
B7	Belarus	9
A8	Bulgaria	6
B8	Lithuania	9

Relegation Finals
A7	Slovenia	10
B8	Lithuania	8

Remain in B Division
Belarus
Slovenia
Relegated to C Division
Lithuania
Bulgaria

==== Playoffs ====
Qualification games
B2	Spain	8
A3	Wales	4
A2	Austria	4
B3	Latvia	8

Semi-finals
A1	Turkey	7
B2	Spain	5
B1	Russia	11
B3	Latvia	3

Finals
A1	Turkey	4
B1	Russia	3
Bronze medal game
B2	Spain	12
B3	Latvia	9

==== Final standings ====
Key
Teams Qualify for 2022 Division A and Advance to the 2022 World Qualification Event
Team Remains in 2022 Division B but Qualified for the 2022 World Qualification Event
Teams Relegated to 2022 Division C

Place	Team
1st place, gold medalist(s)	Turkey
2nd place, silver medalist(s)	Russia
3rd place, bronze medalist(s)	Spain
4	Latvia
5	Austria
5	Wales
7	England
8	Estonia
9	Hungary
10	France
11	Slovakia
12	Belgium
13	Belarus
14	Slovenia
15	Lithuania
16	Bulgaria

=== C division ===
==== Teams ====
The teams are listed as follows:

Andorra	Belgium	Croatia	Ireland	Liechtenstein
Skip: Josep Garcia; Third: Enric Morral; Second: Cesar Mialdea; Lead: Valentin Ortiz	Fourth: Tom van Waterschoot; Third: Jeroen Spruyt; Skip: Timo Verreycken; Lead: Bram van Looy; Alternate: Daan Yskout	Skip: Ante Baus; Third: Bruno Samardzic; Second: Miroslav Jurkovic; Lead: Vedran Horvat; Alternate: Drazen Cutic	Skip: John Wilson; Third: Kyle Paradis; Second: Arran Cameron; Lead: Craig Whyte	Skip: Lukas Matt; Third: Harald Sprenger; Second: Johannes Zimmermann; Lead: Peter Prasch; Alternate: Juergen Gstoehl
Luxembourg	Romania	Slovakia	Slovenia	Ukraine
Skip: Alex Benoy; Third: Philippe Giltaire; Second: Michael Isenor; Lead: Alijaz Pengov Bitenc; Alternate: Lukas Jirousek	Skip: Valentin Anghelinei; Third: Razvan Bouleanu; Second: Cezar Postelnicu; Lead: Marius Mazilu	Skip: Pavol Pitoňák; Third: František Pitoňák; Second: Tomáš Pitoňák; Lead: Peter Pitoňák	Skip: Jure Čulić; Third: Tomas Tisler; Second: Gasper Ursic; Lead: Jost Lajovec; Alternate: Gregor Verbinc	Skip: Mykyta Velychko; Third: Eduard Nikolov; Second: Yaroslav Shchur; Lead: Artem Suhak

==== Round-robin standings ====
Final round-robin standings

Key
Teams to Playoffs

Country	Skip	W	L	W–L	DSC
Belgium	Timo Verreycken	8	1	1–0	48.49
Ireland	John Wilson	8	1	0–1	71.03
Slovenia	Jure Čulić	7	2	–	93.27
Slovakia	Pavol Pitoňák	6	3	–	44.12
Liechtenstein	Lukas Matt	5	4	–	126.66
Romania	Valentin Anghelinei	3	6	1–0	125.01
Croatia	Ante Baus	3	6	0–1	90.91
Ukraine	Mykyta Velychko	2	7	1–0	91.89
Andorra	Josep Garcia	2	7	0–1	125.15
Luxembourg	Alex Benoy	1	8	–	136.45

Round Robin Summary Table
Pos.	Country	Andorra	Belgium	Croatia		Liechtenstein	Luxembourg	Romania	Slovakia	Slovenia	Ukraine	Record
9	Andorra	—	3–8	5–9	3–7	6–7	13–3	5–2	4–7	4–12	0–6	2–7
1	Belgium	8–3	—	6–4	7–6	16–2	13–4	12–2	1–5	8–3	6–5	8–1
7	Croatia	9–5	4–6	—	2–11	6–10	7–4	4–7	3–10	2–9	7–4	3–6
2	Ireland	7–3	6–7	11–2	—	13–4	11–5	6–3	8–5	6–4	8–2	8–1
5	Liechtenstein	7–6	2–16	10–6	4–13	—	1–11	10–4	7–6	2–11	9–4	5–4
10	Luxembourg	3–13	4–13	4–7	5–11	11–1	—	5–8	1–11	2–10	4–8	1–8
6	Romania	2–5	2–12	7–4	3–6	4–10	8–5	—	4–10	0–13	8–3	3–6
4	Slovakia	7–4	5–1	10–3	5–8	6–7	11–1	10–4	—	3–8	9–6	6–3
3	Slovenia	12–4	3–8	9–2	4–6	11–2	10–2	13–0	8–3	—	12–1	7–2
8	Ukraine	6–0	5–6	4–7	2–8	4–9	8–4	3–8	6–9	1–12	—	2–7

==== Playoffs ====
Semifinals
1	Belgium	8
4	Slovakia	6
2	Ireland	5
3	Slovenia	6

Gold medal game
1	Belgium	5
3	Slovenia	8
Bronze medal game
4	Slovakia	7
2	Ireland	2

===== Semifinals =====
Friday, September 17, 9:00

Sheet D	1	2	3	4	5	6	7	8	9	Final
Belgium (Verreycken) 🔨	1	0	3	1	0	0	0	1	2	8
Slovakia (Pitoňák)	0	2	0	0	1	2	1	0	0	6

Sheet E	1	2	3	4	5	6	7	8	9	Final
Ireland (Wilson) 🔨	2	0	1	0	2	0	0	0	0	5
Slovenia (Čulić)	0	2	0	1	0	0	1	1	1	6

===== Bronze medal game =====
Friday, September 17, 14:30

Sheet B	1	2	3	4	5	6	7	8	Final
Slovakia (Pitoňák)	0	2	1	0	2	1	1	X	7
Ireland (Wilson) 🔨	1	0	0	1	0	0	0	X	2

===== Gold medal game =====
Friday, September 17, 14:30

Sheet C	1	2	3	4	5	6	7	8	Final
Belgium (Verreycken) 🔨	0	1	0	2	0	2	0	0	5
Slovenia (Čulić)	0	0	3	0	1	0	3	1	8

==== Final standings ====
Key
Promoted to 2021 B division

Place	Team
1st place, gold medalist(s)	Slovenia
2nd place, silver medalist(s)	Belgium
3rd place, bronze medalist(s)	Slovakia
4	Ireland
5	Liechtenstein
6	Romania
7	Croatia
8	Ukraine
9	Andorra
10	Luxembourg

== Women ==
=== A division ===
==== Teams ====
The teams are listed as follows:

A Division Teams

Czech Republic	Denmark	Estonia	Germany	Italy
Skip: ~~Anna Kubešková~~ (Note: Team Czech Republic's skip Anna Kubešková had the flu and did not compete in the event. As a result, third Alžběta Baudyšová played skip, lead Ežen Kolčevská moved up to play third, Michaela Baudyšová remained at the second position and Klára Svatoňová slotted in to play lead.); Third: Alžběta Baudyšová; Second: Michaela Baudyšová; Lead: Ežen Kolčevská; Alternate: Klára Svatoňová	Skip: Madeleine Dupont; Third: Mathilde Halse; Second: Denise Dupont; Lead: My Larsen; Alternate: Jasmin Lander	Fourth: Kerli Laidsalu; Skip: Liisa Turmann; Second: Heili Grossmann; Lead: Erika Tuvike; Alternate: Karoliine Kaare	Skip: Daniela Jentsch; Third: Emira Abbes; Second: Mia Höhne; Lead: Analena Jentsch; Alternate: Klara-Hermine Fomm	Skip: Stefania Constantini; Third: Marta Lo Deserto; Second: Angela Romei; Lead: Giulia Zardini Lacedelli; Alternate: Elena Dami
Russia	Scotland	Sweden	Switzerland	Turkey
Skip: Alina Kovaleva; Third: Yulia Portunova; Second: Galina Arsenkina; Lead: Ekaterina Kuzmina; Alternate: Maria Komarova	Skip: Eve Muirhead; Third: Vicky Wright; Second: Jennifer Dodds; Lead: Hailey Duff; Alternate: Mili Smith	Skip: Anna Hasselborg; Third: Sara McManus; Second: Agnes Knochenhauer; Lead: Sofia Mabergs; Alternate: Johanna Heldin	Fourth: Alina Pätz; Skip: Silvana Tirinzoni; Second: Esther Neuenschwander; Lead: Melanie Barbezat; Alternate: Carole Howald	Skip: Dilşat Yıldız; Third: Öznur Polat; Second: Berfin Şengül; Lead: Ayşe Gözütok; Alternate: Mihriban Polat

==== Round-robin standings ====
Final round-robin standings

Key
Teams to Playoffs and Qualified for the 2022 World Women's Curling Championship
Teams Qualified for the 2022 World Women's Curling Championship
Team Advances to the 2022 World Qualification Event
Team Relegated to 2022 Division B but qualified for 2022 World Qualification Event
Team Relegated to 2022 Division B

Country	Skip	W	L	W–L	PF	PA	EW	EL	BE	SE	S%	DSC
Scotland	Eve Muirhead	8	1	–	74	34	44	26	7	16	84%	27.25
Russia	Alina Kovaleva	7	2	1–0	67	39	37	29	6	9	82%	27.48
Sweden	Anna Hasselborg	7	2	0–1	55	40	39	33	8	7	83%	18.56
Germany	Daniela Jentsch	6	3	1–0	70	50	41	33	3	13	75%	44.67
Switzerland	Silvana Tirinzoni	6	3	0–1	66	46	38	32	3	12	84%	39.02
Italy	Stefania Constantini	4	5	–	55	58	32	33	9	8	77%	35.16
Turkey	Dilşat Yıldız	3	6	–	52	68	34	41	3	7	69%	64.23
Denmark	Madeleine Dupont	2	7	1–0	42	65	32	42	3	5	76%	45.76
Czech Republic	Alžběta Baudyšová	2	7	0–1	35	70	25	45	4	1	72%	44.93
Estonia	Liisa Turmann	0	9	–	37	83	32	40	3	8	68%	42.64

Round Robin Summary Table
Pos.	Country	Czech Republic	Denmark	Estonia	Germany	Italy	Russia	Scotland	Sweden	Switzerland	Turkey	Record
9	Czech Republic	—	4–7	7–5	4–11	4–11	2–9	1–9	3–5	3–8	7–5	2–7
8	Denmark	7–4	—	8–6	5–10	5–8	3–7	2–8	3–7	3–8	6–7	2–7
10	Estonia	5–7	6–8	—	3–13	5–9	2–11	3–10	4–7	4–10	5–8	0–9
4	Germany	11–4	10–5	13–3	—	6–4	4–7	5–9	6–7	6–5	9–6	6–3
6	Italy	11–4	8–5	9–5	4–6	—	5–7	8–7	3–5	1–10	6–9	4–5
2	Russia	9–2	7–3	11–2	7–4	7–5	—	4–7	6–5	6–10	10–1	7–2
1	Scotland	9–1	8–2	10–3	9–5	7–8	7–4	—	8–5	7–2	9–4	8–1
3	Sweden	5–3	7–3	7–4	7–6	5–3	5–6	5–8	—	8–3	6–4	7–2
5	Switzerland	8–3	8–3	10–4	5–6	10–1	10–6	2–7	3–8	—	10–8	6–3
7	Turkey	5–7	7–6	8–5	6–9	9–6	1–10	4–9	4–6	8–10	—	3–6

==== Round-robin results ====
All draw times are listed in Central European Time (UTC+01:00).

===== Draw 1 =====
Saturday, November 20, 9:00

Sheet A	1	2	3	4	5	6	7	8	9	10	Final
Czech Republic (Baudyšová) 🔨	0	1	0	0	0	0	1	0	1	0	3
Sweden (Hasselborg)	1	0	1	1	0	0	0	1	0	1	5

Sheet B	1	2	3	4	5	6	7	8	9	10	Final
Italy (Constantini) 🔨	2	0	2	1	0	1	0	0	2	X	8
Denmark (Dupont)	0	0	0	0	3	0	1	1	0	X	5

Sheet C	1	2	3	4	5	6	7	8	9	10	Final
Germany (Jentsch)	1	0	0	2	1	1	2	0	6	X	13
Estonia (Turmann) 🔨	0	1	1	0	0	0	0	1	0	X	3

Sheet D	1	2	3	4	5	6	7	8	9	10	Final
Scotland (Muirhead) 🔨	2	0	1	0	1	1	0	1	0	1	7
Russia (Kovaleva)	0	1	0	1	0	0	1	0	1	0	4

Sheet E	1	2	3	4	5	6	7	8	9	10	Final
Switzerland (Tirinzoni) 🔨	0	2	0	1	0	1	4	1	0	1	10
Turkey (Yıldız)	1	0	2	0	2	0	0	0	3	0	8

===== Draw 2 =====
Saturday, November 20, 19:00

Sheet A	1	2	3	4	5	6	7	8	9	10	Final
Denmark (Dupont)	0	0	1	0	0	1	0	0	X	X	2
Scotland (Muirhead) 🔨	0	2	0	2	1	0	2	1	X	X	8

Sheet B	1	2	3	4	5	6	7	8	9	10	11	Final
Sweden (Hasselborg) 🔨	0	1	0	1	0	1	0	1	0	1	0	5
Russia (Kovaleva)	0	0	2	0	1	0	2	0	0	0	1	6

Sheet C	1	2	3	4	5	6	7	8	9	10	Final
Switzerland (Tirinzoni)	3	1	0	1	0	1	0	2	X	X	8
Czech Republic (Baudyšová) 🔨	0	0	1	0	1	0	1	0	X	X	3

Sheet D	1	2	3	4	5	6	7	8	9	10	Final
Turkey (Yıldız) 🔨	0	2	0	0	2	0	2	0	2	X	8
Estonia (Turmann)	2	0	0	1	0	1	0	1	0	X	5

Sheet E	1	2	3	4	5	6	7	8	9	10	Final
Italy (Constantini) 🔨	0	1	0	1	0	0	0	0	2	X	4
Germany (Jentsch)	0	0	1	0	3	1	1	0	0	X	6

===== Draw 3 =====
Sunday, November 21, 14:00

Sheet A	1	2	3	4	5	6	7	8	9	10	Final
Estonia (Turmann)	0	2	1	1	0	0	1	0	0	0	5
Italy (Constantini) 🔨	2	0	0	0	0	2	0	1	1	3	9

Sheet B	1	2	3	4	5	6	7	8	9	10	Final
Czech Republic (Baudyšová)	0	0	3	0	2	0	1	1	0	X	7
Turkey (Yıldız) 🔨	1	0	0	2	0	1	0	0	1	X	5

Sheet C	1	2	3	4	5	6	7	8	9	10	Final
Sweden (Hasselborg)	2	0	2	0	0	0	0	1	0	0	5
Scotland (Muirhead) 🔨	0	1	0	2	1	1	1	0	1	1	8

Sheet D	1	2	3	4	5	6	7	8	9	10	Final
Germany (Jentsch)	0	0	1	0	0	2	0	1	1	1	6
Switzerland (Tirinzoni) 🔨	0	1	0	1	0	0	3	0	0	0	5

Sheet E	1	2	3	4	5	6	7	8	9	10	Final
Denmark (Dupont)	0	0	0	0	1	1	0	1	0	X	3
Russia (Kovaleva) 🔨	0	2	1	1	0	0	1	0	2	X	7

===== Draw 4 =====
Monday, November 22, 8:00

Sheet A	1	2	3	4	5	6	7	8	9	10	Final
Russia (Kovaleva) 🔨	1	0	1	2	0	0	2	0	0	0	6
Switzerland (Tirinzoni)	0	2	0	0	4	0	0	0	2	2	10

Sheet B	1	2	3	4	5	6	7	8	9	10	Final
Germany (Jentsch)	0	1	0	2	0	0	2	0	0	X	5
Scotland (Muirhead) 🔨	1	0	3	0	0	3	0	1	1	X	9

Sheet C	1	2	3	4	5	6	7	8	9	10	Final
Turkey (Yıldız)	0	0	1	0	2	1	0	1	1	1	7
Denmark (Dupont) 🔨	2	2	0	1	0	0	1	0	0	0	6

Sheet D	1	2	3	4	5	6	7	8	9	10	Final
Estonia (Turmann)	0	1	1	1	1	0	0	0	1	0	5
Czech Republic (Baudyšová) 🔨	5	0	0	0	0	0	1	0	0	1	7

Sheet E	1	2	3	4	5	6	7	8	9	10	Final
Sweden (Hasselborg) 🔨	0	1	0	3	0	0	0	1	0	X	5
Italy (Constantini)	0	0	2	0	0	1	0	0	0	X	3

===== Draw 5 =====
Monday, November 22, 16:00

Sheet A	1	2	3	4	5	6	7	8	9	10	Final
Germany (Jentsch)	0	4	0	2	0	2	0	2	X	X	10
Denmark (Dupont) 🔨	1	0	1	0	1	0	2	0	X	X	5

Sheet B	1	2	3	4	5	6	7	8	9	10	Final
Switzerland (Tirinzoni)	0	1	0	0	1	1	0	0	X	X	3
Sweden (Hasselborg) 🔨	1	0	1	3	0	0	2	1	X	X	8

Sheet C	1	2	3	4	5	6	7	8	9	10	Final
Czech Republic (Baudyšová)	0	1	0	0	1	0	X	X	X	X	2
Russia (Kovaleva) 🔨	1	0	3	1	0	4	X	X	X	X	9

Sheet D	1	2	3	4	5	6	7	8	9	10	Final
Italy (Constantini)	0	0	2	0	0	2	0	0	2	X	6
Turkey (Yıldız) 🔨	0	1	0	5	1	0	0	2	0	X	9

Sheet E	1	2	3	4	5	6	7	8	9	10	Final
Scotland (Muirhead)	2	3	0	0	3	0	2	X	X	X	10
Estonia (Turmann) 🔨	0	0	1	1	0	1	0	X	X	X	3

===== Draw 6 =====
Tuesday, November 23, 9:00

Sheet A	1	2	3	4	5	6	7	8	9	10	Final
Switzerland (Tirinzoni) 🔨	4	0	0	2	0	2	0	2	X	X	10
Estonia (Turmann)	0	0	1	0	2	0	1	0	X	X	4

Sheet B	1	2	3	4	5	6	7	8	9	10	Final
Denmark (Dupont) 🔨	2	0	0	1	0	1	2	0	1	X	7
Czech Republic (Baudyšová)	0	2	0	0	1	0	0	1	0	X	4

Sheet C	1	2	3	4	5	6	7	8	9	10	Final
Scotland (Muirhead) 🔨	0	0	0	1	0	2	0	3	0	1	7
Italy (Constantini)	0	0	2	0	4	0	1	0	1	0	8

Sheet D	1	2	3	4	5	6	7	8	9	10	Final
Russia (Kovaleva)	0	4	0	2	0	0	1	0	0	X	7
Germany (Jentsch) 🔨	1	0	1	0	2	0	0	0	0	X	4

Sheet E	1	2	3	4	5	6	7	8	9	10	Final
Turkey (Yıldız)	0	1	0	0	0	1	0	2	0	X	4
Sweden (Hasselborg) 🔨	2	0	0	2	0	0	1	0	1	X	6

===== Draw 7 =====
Tuesday, November 23, 19:00

Sheet A	1	2	3	4	5	6	7	8	9	10	Final
Italy (Constantini)	0	2	0	2	1	0	0	0	0	X	5
Russia (Kovaleva) 🔨	2	0	2	0	0	3	0	0	0	X	7

Sheet B	1	2	3	4	5	6	7	8	9	10	Final
Turkey (Yıldız) 🔨	2	0	1	0	1	0	0	2	0	0	6
Germany (Jentsch)	0	2	0	2	0	1	1	0	2	1	9

Sheet C	1	2	3	4	5	6	7	8	9	10	Final
Estonia (Turmann)	0	0	1	0	1	0	1	0	1	X	4
Sweden (Hasselborg) 🔨	3	1	0	1	0	1	0	1	0	X	7

Sheet D	1	2	3	4	5	6	7	8	9	10	Final
Switzerland (Tirinzoni) 🔨	2	0	1	1	0	2	1	0	1	X	8
Denmark (Dupont)	0	1	0	0	1	0	0	1	0	X	3

Sheet E	1	2	3	4	5	6	7	8	9	10	Final
Czech Republic (Baudyšová)	0	0	0	0	1	0	0	X	X	X	1
Scotland (Muirhead) 🔨	0	2	1	2	0	3	1	X	X	X	9

===== Draw 8 =====
Wednesday, November 24, 14:00

Sheet A	1	2	3	4	5	6	7	8	9	10	11	Final
Sweden (Hasselborg) 🔨	0	2	0	1	0	2	0	0	1	0	1	7
Germany (Jentsch)	0	0	1	0	1	0	3	0	0	1	0	6

Sheet B	1	2	3	4	5	6	7	8	9	10	Final
Scotland (Muirhead)	0	0	0	2	1	2	0	2	X	X	7
Switzerland (Tirinzoni) 🔨	0	1	0	0	0	0	1	0	X	X	2

Sheet C	1	2	3	4	5	6	7	8	9	10	Final
Russia (Kovaleva) 🔨	2	1	2	0	0	2	1	2	X	X	10
Turkey (Yıldız)	0	0	0	1	0	0	0	0	X	X	1

Sheet D	1	2	3	4	5	6	7	8	9	10	Final
Czech Republic (Baudyšová)	0	1	0	1	0	0	2	0	0	X	4
Italy (Constantini) 🔨	2	0	2	0	1	2	0	2	2	X	11

Sheet E	1	2	3	4	5	6	7	8	9	10	Final
Estonia (Turmann)	0	1	0	2	0	1	0	2	0	0	6
Denmark (Dupont) 🔨	1	0	2	0	2	0	2	0	0	1	8

===== Draw 9 =====
Thursday, November 25, 8:00

Sheet A	1	2	3	4	5	6	7	8	9	10	Final
Scotland (Muirhead) 🔨	0	3	0	0	2	1	0	0	3	X	9
Turkey (Yıldız)	1	0	1	0	0	0	1	1	0	X	4

Sheet B	1	2	3	4	5	6	7	8	9	10	Final
Russia (Kovaleva) 🔨	2	2	0	0	2	0	5	X	X	X	11
Estonia (Turmann)	0	0	1	0	0	1	0	X	X	X	2

Sheet C	1	2	3	4	5	6	7	8	9	10	Final
Italy (Constantini) 🔨	0	0	0	1	0	0	0	X	X	X	1
Switzerland (Tirinzoni)	1	0	2	0	2	2	3	X	X	X	10

Sheet D	1	2	3	4	5	6	7	8	9	10	Final
Denmark (Dupont)	0	0	1	0	0	1	0	1	0	X	3
Sweden (Hasselborg) 🔨	0	0	0	2	1	0	2	0	2	X	7

Sheet E	1	2	3	4	5	6	7	8	9	10	Final
Germany (Jentsch)	1	3	0	2	0	1	0	1	3	X	11
Czech Republic (Baudyšová) 🔨	0	0	1	0	1	0	2	0	0	X	4

==== Playoffs ====
Semifinals
1	Scotland	7
4	Germany	4
2	Russia	4
3	Sweden	5

Gold medal game
1	Scotland	7
3	Sweden	4
Bronze medal game
4	Germany	9
2	Russia	6

===== Semifinal 1 =====
Thursday, November 25, 16:00

Sheet C	1	2	3	4	5	6	7	8	9	10	Final
Russia (Kovaleva) 🔨	1	0	1	0	0	2	0	0	0	0	4
Sweden (Hasselborg)	0	1	0	1	0	0	0	0	2	1	5

Player percentages
Russia		Sweden	
Ekaterina Kuzmina	75%	Sofia Mabergs	96%
Galina Arsenkina	84%	Agnes Knochenhauer	79%
Yulia Portunova	84%	Sara McManus	79%
Alina Kovaleva	76%	Anna Hasselborg	83%
Total	80%	Total	84%

===== Semifinal 2 =====
Thursday, November 25, 20:00

Sheet C	1	2	3	4	5	6	7	8	9	10	Final
Scotland (Muirhead) 🔨	0	0	0	1	0	2	1	0	2	1	7
Germany (Jentsch)	0	1	1	0	1	0	0	1	0	0	4

Player percentages
Scotland		Germany	
Hailey Duff	84%	Analena Jentsch	78%
Jennifer Dodds	84%	Mia Höhne	74%
Vicky Wright	69%	Emira Abbes	63%
Eve Muirhead	74%	Daniela Jentsch	70%
Total	78%	Total	71%

===== Bronze medal game =====
Friday, November 26, 18:00

Sheet C	1	2	3	4	5	6	7	8	9	10	Final
Germany (Jentsch)	0	1	0	2	0	2	0	0	2	2	9
Russia (Kovaleva) 🔨	1	0	2	0	2	0	0	1	0	0	6

Player percentages
Germany		Russia	
Analena Jentsch	74%	Ekaterina Kuzmina	80%
Mia Höhne	68%	Galina Arsenkina	84%
Emira Abbes	70%	Yulia Portunova	66%
Daniela Jentsch	71%	Alina Kovaleva	69%
Total	71%	Total	75%

===== Gold medal game =====
Saturday, November 27, 12:30

Sheet C	1	2	3	4	5	6	7	8	9	10	Final
Scotland (Muirhead) 🔨	0	1	0	2	0	0	0	2	0	2	7
Sweden (Hasselborg)	1	0	0	0	1	0	0	0	2	0	4

Player percentages
Scotland		Sweden	
Hailey Duff	83%	Sofia Mabergs	94%
Jennifer Dodds	86%	Agnes Knochenhauer	78%
Vicky Wright	84%	Sara McManus	86%
Eve Muirhead	78%	Anna Hasselborg	75%
Total	83%	Total	83%

==== Player percentages ====
Round Robin only

Leads	%
(Switzerland) Melanie Barbezat	87.2
(Sweden) Sofia Mabergs	86.4
(Scotland) Hailey Duff	84.3
(Denmark) My Larsen	84.2
(Russia) Ekaterina Kuzmina	81.6

Seconds	%
(Switzerland) Esther Neuenschwander	86.4
(Russia) Galina Arsenkina	85.9
(Scotland) Jennifer Dodds	84.4
(Sweden) Agnes Knochenhauer	83.6
(Italy) Angela Romei	77.3

Thirds	%
(Switzerland) Silvana Tirinzoni	84.0
(Sweden) Sara McManus	82.8
(Scotland) Vicky Wright	81.3
(Russia) Yulia Portunova	78.1
(Italy) Marta Lo Deserto	76.9

Skips/Fourths	%
(Scotland) Eve Muirhead	84.2
(Russia) Alina Kovaleva	80.9
(Sweden) Anna Hasselborg	80.3
(Switzerland) Alina Pätz	78.9
(Germany) Daniela Jentsch	78.3

==== Final standings ====
Key
Teams Advance to the 2022 World Women's Curling Championship
Team Advances to the 2022 World Qualification Event
Team Relegated to 2022 Division B but qualified for 2022 World Qualification Event
Team Relegated to 2022 Division B

Place	Team
1st place, gold medalist(s)	Scotland
2nd place, silver medalist(s)	Sweden
3rd place, bronze medalist(s)	Germany
4	Russia
5	Switzerland
6	Italy
7	Turkey
8	Denmark
9	Czech Republic
10	Estonia

=== B division ===
==== Teams ====
The teams are listed as follows:

Austria	England	Finland	Hungary	Latvia
Skip: Hannah Augustin; Third: Marijke Reitsma; Second: Sara Haidinger; Lead: Johanna Höß; Alternate: Teresa Treichel	Skip: Hetty Garnier; Third: Anna Fowler; Second: Angharad Ward; Lead: Naomi Robinson	Skip: Miia Ahrenberg; Third: Minna Karvinen; Second: Susanna Säntti; Lead: Jenni Bäckman; Alternate: Tiina Suuripää	Fourth: Ildikó Szekeres; Third: Linda Joó; Skip: Ágnes Szentannai; Lead: Laura Nagy; Alternate: Gyöngyi Nagy	Skip: Evelīna Barone; Third: Rēzija Ieviņa; Second: Veronika Apse; Lead: Ērika Patrīcija Bitmete; Alternate: Letīcija Ieviņa
Lithuania	Norway	Slovakia	Slovenia	Spain
Skip: Virginija Paulauskaitė; Third: Olga Dvojeglazova; Second: Dovilė Aukštuolytė; Lead: Rūta Blažienė	Fourth: Kristin Skaslien; Skip: Marianne Rørvik; Second: Mille Haslev Nordbye; Lead: Martine Rønning; Alternate: Eli Skaslien	Skip: Daniela Matulová; Third: Lucia Orokocká; Second: Slávka Makovníková; Lead: Martina Ščepková; Alternate: Silvia Sýkorová	Fourth: Maruša Gorišek; Skip: Ajda Zavrtanik Drglin; Second: Petra Klemenc; Lead: Anja Pečaver	Skip: Irantzu García; Third: María Gómez; Second: María Fernández; Lead: Ana Vázquez; Alternate: Nerea Torralba

==== Round-robin standings ====
Final round-robin standings

Key
Teams to Playoffs
Teams to Relegated to 2022 C Division

Country	Skip	W	L	W–L	DSC
Hungary	Ágnes Szentannai	8	1	–	45.24
Norway	Marianne Rørvik	7	2	1–0	29.09
England	Hetty Garnier	7	2	0–1	83.89
Latvia	Evelīna Barone	6	3	1–0	59.09
Lithuania	Virginija Paulauskaitė	6	3	0–1	69.15
Austria	Hannah Augustin	4	5	–	77.98
Slovenia	Ajda Zavrtanik Drglin	3	6	–	100.34
Slovakia	Daniela Matulová	2	7	1–0	95.08
Spain	Irantzu García	2	7	0–1	67.24
Finland	Miia Ahrenberg	0	9	–	73.81

Round Robin Summary Table
Pos.	Country	Austria	England	Finland	Hungary	Latvia	Lithuania	Norway	Slovakia	Slovenia	Spain	Record
6	Austria	—	7–8	10–4	2–7	11–2	7–8	2–8	7–4	6–7	11–6	4–5
3	England	8–7	—	8–5	8–9	8–5	10–5	5–9	10–5	10–4	9–5	7–2
10	Finland	4–10	5–8	—	3–10	8–10	3–8	4–9	2–11	8–10	5–9	0–9
1	Hungary	7–2	9–8	10–3	—	10–2	3–7	7–6	9–2	7–5	9–3	8–1
4	Latvia	2–11	5–8	10–8	2–10	—	6–4	10–4	10–2	8–6	10–4	6–3
5	Lithuania	8–7	5–10	8–3	7–3	4–6	—	3–6	9–2	11–9	9–5	6–3
2	Norway	8–2	9–5	9–4	6–7	4–10	6–3	—	8–3	11–1	12–2	7–2
8	Slovakia	4–7	5–10	11–2	2–9	2–10	2–9	3–8	—	4–7	7–6	2–7
7	Slovenia	7–6	4–10	10–8	5–7	6–8	9–11	1–11	7–4	—	7–9	3–6
9	Spain	6–11	5–9	9–5	3–9	4–10	5–9	2–12	6–7	9–7	—	2–7

==== Playoffs ====
Semi-finals
1	Hungary	2
4	Latvia	10
2	Norway	10
3	England	4

Gold medal game
4	Latvia	7
2	Norway	10
Bronze medal game
1	Hungary	8
3	England	4

==== Final standings ====
Key
Teams Qualify for 2022 Division A and Advance to the 2022 World Qualification Event
Teams Relegated to 2022 Division C

Place	Team
1st place, gold medalist(s)	Norway
2nd place, silver medalist(s)	Latvia
3rd place, bronze medalist(s)	Hungary
4	England
5	Lithuania
6	Austria
7	Slovenia
8	Slovakia
9	Spain
10	Finland

=== C division ===
==== Teams ====
The teams are listed as follows:

Austria	Belgium	Lithuania	Slovenia	Ukraine
Skip: Hannah Augustin; Third: Marijke Reitsma; Second: Sara Haidinger; Lead: Johanna Höß; Alternate: Teresa Treichl	Fourth: Danielle Berus; Third: Veerle Geerinckx; Second: Kim Catteceur; Skip: Caro van Oosterwyck; Alternate: Annemiek Huiskamp	Skip: Virginija Paulauskaitė; Third: Olga Dvojeglazova; Second: Dovile Aukstuolyte; Lead: Ruta Blaziene	Fourth: Maruša Gorišek; Skip: Ajda Zavartanik Drglin; Lead: Petra Klemenc	Skip: Anastasiia Kotova; Third: Yaroslava Kalinichenko; Second: Polina Putintseva; Lead: Sofiia Koverda; Alternate: Oleksandra Kononenko

==== Round-robin standings ====
Final round-robin standings

Key
Teams to playoffs

Country	Skip	W	L	W–L	DSC
Lithuania	Virginija Paulauskaitė	7	1	1–1	51.95
Austria	Hannah Augustin	7	1	1–1	78.42
Slovenia	Ajda Zavrtanik Drglin	4	4	–	117.80
Ukraine	Anastasiia Kotova	1	7	1–1	81.56
Belgium	Danielle Berus	1	7	1–1	95.06

Round Robin Summary Table
Pos.	Country	Austria		Belgium		Lithuania		Slovenia		Ukraine		Record
Pos.	Country	1st	2nd	1st	2nd	1st	2nd	1st	2nd	1st	2nd	Record
2	Austria	—		11–7	10–4	6–3	4–6	7–3	6–4	6–2	13–1	7–1
5	Belgium	7–11	4–10	—		0–8	6–10	4–8	2–10	9–5	4–6	1–7
1	Lithuania	3–6	6–4	8–0	10–6	—		6–3	8–6	8–4	8–2	7–1
3	Slovenia	3–7	4–6	8–4	10–2	3–6	6–8	—		6–3	6–2	4–4
4	Ukraine	2–6	1–13	5–9	6–4	4–8	2–8	3–6	2–6	—		1–7

==== Playoffs ====
Semifinal			Gold medal game
			1	Lithuania	6
2	Austria	3	3	Slovenia	3
3	Slovenia	6

===== Semifinal =====
Friday, September 17, 9:00

Sheet C	1	2	3	4	5	6	7	8	Final
Austria (Augustin) 🔨	0	1	0	0	1	1	0	0	3
Slovenia (Zavrtanik Drglin)	1	0	1	2	0	0	1	1	6

===== Gold medal game =====
Friday, September 17, 14:30

Sheet D	1	2	3	4	5	6	7	8	Final
Lithuania (Paulauskaitė) 🔨	3	0	1	0	2	0	0	X	6
Slovenia (Zavrtanik Drglin)	0	2	0	0	0	1	0	X	3

==== Final standings ====
Key
Promoted to 2021 B division

Place	Team
1st place, gold medalist(s)	Lithuania
2nd place, silver medalist(s)	Slovenia
3rd place, bronze medalist(s)	Austria
4	Ukraine
5	Belgium
