= Yulia Portunova =

Russian curler (born 1994)

Yulia Portunova Ю́лия Портуно́ва
- Curler
- Born: Yulia Alexandrova Portunova; 4 May 1994 (age 32); Kaliningrad, Russia

Team
- Curling club: CC Krasnodarsky kray, Sochi
- Skip: Alina Kovaleva
- Third: Yulia Portunova
- Second: Galina Arsenkina
- Lead: Ekaterina Kuzmina
- Alternate: Maria Komarova

Curling career
- Member Association: Russia
- World Championship: 2 (2018, 2021)
- European Championship: 2 (2016, 2021)
- Olympic: 2 (2018, 2022)
Medal record
Women's Curling
Representing Russia
World Championships
Bronze medal – third place	2018 North Bay
European Championships
Gold medal – first place	2016 Renfrewshire
World Junior Championships
Gold medal – first place	2013 Sochi
Bronze medal – third place	2014 Flims
Winter Universiade
Silver medal – second place	2017 Almaty
Representing RCF
World Championships
Silver medal – second place	2021 Calgary

Yulia Alexandrova Portunova (Russian: Ю́лия Алекса́ндровна Портуно́ва; born 4 May 1994) is a Russian curler from Kaliningrad. She currently plays third on Team Alina Kovaleva. She competed at the 2018 and 2022 Winter Olympics as the alternate on Olympic Athletes from Russia and the third on the Russian Olympic Committee women's curling teams, skipped by Victoria Moiseeva and Alina Kovaleva respectively. She has won two medals at the World Women's Curling Championship: a bronze in 2018 and silver in 2021. She was also the alternate for the Moiseeva rink when they won the 2016 European Curling Championships.

== Career ==
Portunova broke onto the national stage at the 2013 World Junior Curling Championships, where she threw fourth stones for the Russian team skipped by Alina Kovaleva. After qualifying for the tiebreaker round with a 5–4 round robin record, the Russian team won four sudden-death games en route to capturing the World Junior title. It was Russia's first title at the event since 2006. They returned to defend their title the following season at the 2014 World Junior Curling Championships but lost in the 3 vs. 4 page playoff game to Sweden's Isabella Wranå. They then defeated Sweden in the bronze medal game to secure third place and bronze medals for the tournament.

Portunova was the alternate for Team Victoria Moiseeva, who represented Russia at the 2016 European Curling Championships. The team qualified for the event by defeating the two-time world bronze medallist Anna Sidorova rink in the Russian Supercup. Despite entering the event as rookies, the team qualified for the playoffs with a 6–3 record. They then upset Scotland's Eve Muirhead 11–6 in the semifinal to qualify for the final, where they faced Sweden's Anna Hasselborg. Tied 4–4 in the final end, Hasselborg missed her final draw, giving the Russians two points and the victory. Also during the 2016–17 season, Team Moiseeva won the silver medal at the 2017 Winter Universiade, losing to Canada's Kelsey Rocque in the final.

The Sidorova rink was initially selected to represent Russia at the 2018 Winter Olympics, but after their poor play during the 2017–18 season, the Russian Curling Federation was forced to hold a best-of-seven Olympic Trials between Team Moiseeva and Team Sidorova to see who would represent the "Olympic Athletes from Russia" team at the Olympics. Team Moiseeva won the series four games to one, earning them the Olympic spot. At the 2018 Winter Olympics in PyeongChang, South Korea, the team struggled, finishing in a dismal ninth place with a 2–7 record. Team Moiseeva also represented Russia at the 2018 World Women's Curling Championship where Portunova played third on the team. They had a much stronger tournament at the World's, qualifying for the playoffs with a 7–5 round robin record and defeating the United States to win the bronze medal.

Portunova joined the Sidorova rink at third for the 2018–19 season. On tour, the team won two events, the Karuizawa International and the International Bernese Ladies Cup and lost the final of the Stockholm Ladies Cup to Anna Hasselborg. The team also competed in three legs of the 2018–19 Curling World Cup, finishing in third at all three legs they attended. They competed in a best-of-seven series against the Alina Kovaleva rink to represent Russia at the 2019 World Women's Curling Championship but lost the event four games to one.

Team Sidorova started the 2019–20 season at the 2019 Cameron's Brewing Oakville Fall Classic, where they lost in the qualification game. They next played in the Stu Sells Oakville Tankard where they lost to Anna Hasselborg in the final. They missed the playoffs at the inaugural WCT Uiseong International Curling Cup before having a quarterfinal finish at the Women's Masters Basel. Despite their early successes on tour, Team Sidorova lost the Russian qualifier for the 2019 European Curling Championships to Alina Kovaleva in six games. They turned things around, however, the following month at the Karuizawa International where they went an undefeated 7–0 throughout the event and defeated Satsuki Fujisawa 5–4 in the final. They also had a semifinal finish at the Glynhill Ladies International and a quarterfinal finish at the International Bernese Ladies Cup. Their final event of the season was at the 2020 Russian Women's World Qualification Event, where they would once again lose to the Kovaleva rink in a best-of-seven series.

Portunova and her team began the abbreviated 2020–21 season at the 2020 Russian Women's Curling Cup, where they went undefeated until the final, where they lost to Team Kovaleva. In December 2020, Team Sidorova competed in the 2020 national championship as it had been postponed due to the COVID-19 pandemic. There, they topped the round robin with an 8–1 record, defeating the Kovaleva rink in their final round robin draw. They then lost both the 1 vs. 2 page playoff and final to Kovaleva, settling for silver. A "curling bubble" was set up in Calgary, Canada in the spring, which hosted several events, including the 2021 World Women's Curling Championship and two slams. Team Kovaleva qualified for all three events and added Portunova to their lineup due to a conflict with the 2021 Russian Women's Curling Championship where their regular third Maria Komarova was representing the team. At the 2021 Champions Cup, the team qualified for the playoffs before losing to Silvana Tirinzoni in the quarterfinals. They then missed the playoffs at the 2021 Players' Championship, finishing 2–3. The following week, the team represented the RCF (Russian Curling Federation) at the World Championships, as Russia is prohibited from competing under its flag or any national symbols at any Olympic Games or world championships until December 16, 2022. The team finished second through the round robin with an 11–2 record, giving them a direct bye to the semifinals. They then defeated Sweden's Anna Hasselborg 8–7 in the semifinal before losing the final to Switzerland's Silvana Tirinzoni after Kovaleva missed a freeze on her final shot.

In their first event of the 2021–22 season, Team Kovaleva went undefeated to claim the Saint Petersburg Classic. At the first Slam of the season, the 2021 Masters, the team reached the semifinals where they lost to Tracy Fleury. They also qualified for the playoffs at the 2021 National, however, lost to Silvana Tirinzoni in the quarterfinal round. At the 2021 European Curling Championships, Team Kovaleva went through the round robin with a 7–2 record, qualifying for the playoffs. They then lost to Sweden's Anna Hasselborg and Germany's Daniela Jentsch in the semifinal and bronze medal games, respectively, placing fourth. Because of their second place finish at the 2021 World Championship, Portunova and her teammates Alina Kovaleva, Galina Arsenkina, Ekaterina Kuzmina and Maria Komarova qualified directly for the 2022 Winter Olympics where they represented the ROC (Russian Olympic Committee). At the Games, the team had a poor performance, finishing at the bottom of the standings with a 1–8 record. The Olympics would be the team's final event of the season as due to the Russian invasion of Ukraine, all Russian teams were banned from participating in any World Curling Championships in 2022. The team was also excluded from the final two Grand Slams of the season, the 2022 Players' Championship and the 2022 Champions Cup. At the end of the season, Team Kovaleva competed in the 2022 Nornickel Curling Cup, held only between Russian teams. There, they finished in third place.

== Personal life ==
Portunova is a full-time curler.

== Grand Slam record ==
Key
C	Champion
F	Lost in Final
SF	Lost in Semifinal
QF	Lost in Quarterfinals
R16	Lost in the round of 16
Q	Did not advance to playoffs
T2	Played in Tier 2 event
DNP	Did not participate in event
N/A	Not a Grand Slam event that season

Event	2020–21	2021–22
Masters	N/A	SF
The National	N/A	QF
Players'	Q	DNP
Champions Cup	QF	DNP

== Teams ==
Season	Skip	Third	Second	Lead	Alternate
2011–12	Olga Zharkova	Yulia Portunova	Alisa Tregub	Julia Guzieva	
2012–13	Olga Zharkova	Yulia Portunova	Alisa Tregub	Julia Guzieva	Ekaterina Sharapova
2012–13	Yulia Portunova (Fourth)	Alina Kovaleva (Skip)	Alexandra Saitova	Oksana Gertova	Olesia Gluschenko
2013–14	Olga Zharkova	Yulia Portunova	Alisa Tregub	Julia Guzieva	Oksana Gertova
2013–14	Yulia Portunova (Fourth)	Alina Kovaleva	Uliana Vasilyeva	Anastasia Bryzgalova	Anastasia Moskaleva
2014–15	Olga Zharkova	Yulia Portunova	Galina Arsenkina	Julia Guzieva	
2015–16	Victoria Moiseeva	Yulia Portunova	Alina Kovaleva	Julia Guzieva	Anastasia Bryzgalova
2016–17	Victoria Moiseeva	Uliana Vasilyeva	Galina Arsenkina	Julia Guzieva	Yulia Portunova
2016–17	Victoria Moiseeva	Uliana Vasilyeva	Galina Arsenkina	Yulia Portunova	Maria Duyunova
2017–18	Victoria Moiseeva	Uliana Vasilyeva	Galina Arsenkina	Julia Guzieva	Yulia Portunova
2017–18	Victoria Moiseeva	Yulia Portunova	Galina Arsenkina	Julia Guzieva	Anna Sidorova
2018–19	Anna Sidorova	Margarita Fomina	Yulia Portunova	Julia Guzieva	Nkeirouka Ezekh
2019–20	Anna Sidorova	Yulia Portunova	Olga Kotelnikova	Julia Guzieva	Svetlana Kalalb
2020–21	Anna Sidorova	Yulia Portunova	Liudmila Privivkova	Maria Ignatenko	Sofia Tkach
2020–21	Alina Kovaleva	Yulia Portunova	Galina Arsenkina	Ekaterina Kuzmina	Maria Komarova
2021–22	Alina Kovaleva	Yulia Portunova	Galina Arsenkina	Ekaterina Kuzmina	Maria Komarova
