= Galina Arsenkina =

Russian curler (born 1991)

Galina Arsenkina Гали́на Арсе́нькина
- Curler
- Born: Galina Petrovna Arsenkina; 6 June 1991 (age 35); Zelenograd, Moscow, Russian SFSR, Soviet Union

Team
- Curling club: CC Krasnodarsky Kray, Sochi

Curling career
- Member Association: Russia
- World Championship: 3 (2018, 2019, 2021)
- European Championship: 4 (2016, 2018, 2019, 2021)
- Olympic: 2 (2018, 2022)
Medal record
Women's Curling
Representing Russia
World Championships
Bronze medal – third place	2018 North Bay
European Championships
Gold medal – first place	2016 Renfrewshire
World Junior Championships
Bronze medal – third place	2011 Perth
Bronze medal – third place	2012 Östersund
Winter Universiade
Silver medal – second place	2017 Almaty
Representing RCF
World Championships
Silver medal – second place	2021 Calgary

Galina Petrovna Arsenkina (Russian: Гали́на Петро́вна Арсе́нькина; born 6 June 1991 in Zelenograd) is a retired Russian curler from Moscow. She competed at the 2018 and 2022 Winter Olympics as the second on the Olympic Athletes from Russia and Russian Olympic Committee women's curling teams, skipped by Victoria Moiseeva and Alina Kovaleva respectively. She won two medals at the World Women's Curling Championship: a silver in 2021 and a bronze in 2018. She was also the second on Team Moiseeva when they won the 2016 European Curling Championships.

== Career ==
During her junior career, Arsenkina competed in four straight World Junior Curling Championships from 2009 to 2012. After failing to win a medal in their first two appearances, the Russian team was successful in 2011. The team, consisting of Arsenkina, Anna Sidorova, Olga Zyablikova, Ekaterina Antonova and Victoria Moiseeva defeated Sweden's Sara McManus 9–3 in the bronze medal game to win Russia's second ever medal at the world junior championship. The following year at the 2012 World Junior Curling Championships, they again won the bronze, once again defeating Sweden's McManus in the bronze medal game. Also during her junior career, Arsenkina represented Russia at the 2008 European Mixed Curling Championship and the 2009 European Youth Olympic Winter Festival, placing fourth at both events.

During the 2011–12 season, Arsenkina found success on tour as the lead for the Olga Zyablikova rink. The team reached the final of the Kamloops Crown of Curling, where they were defeated by Switzerland's Michèle Jäggi. They also reached the quarterfinals of the Twin Anchors Invitational, the Stockholm Ladies Cup and the Glynhill Ladies International. The following season, she and her team of Victoria Moiseeva, Ekaterina Antonova and Alexandra Saitova competed in their first ever Grand Slam of Curling event at the 2012 Colonial Square Ladies Classic. The team went 3–3 through the qualifying stage, not making the playoffs.

The 2016–17 season was a breakthrough year for the Moiseeva rink, first representing Russia at the 2016 European Curling Championships. The team qualified for the event by defeating the two-time world bronze medallist Anna Sidorova rink in the Russian Supercup. Despite entering the event as rookies, the team qualified for the playoffs with a 6–3 record. They then upset Scotland's Eve Muirhead 11–6 in the semifinal to qualify for the final, where they faced Sweden's Anna Hasselborg. Tied 4–4 in the final end, Hasselborg missed her final draw, giving the Russians two points and the victory. Next, the team played in the 2017 Winter Universiade where they earned the silver medal, losing to Canada's Kelsey Rocque in the final. They ended their season at the 2017 Champions Cup Grand Slam event, which they qualified for by winning the European Championship. There, the team went 1–3 through the round robin, missing the playoffs.

Team Moiseeva had a superb start to the 2017–18 season, finishing third at the 2017 CCT Arctic Cup. In the fall, they won three of their tour events, the Oakville Fall Classic, the Crestwood Ladies Fall Classic and the Driving Force Abbotsford Cashspiel. The Sidorova rink was initially selected to represent Russia at the 2018 Winter Olympics, but after their poor play during the beginning of the 2017–18 season and Team Moiseeva's strong performances, the Russian Curling Federation was forced to hold a best-of-seven Olympic Trials between Team Moiseeva and Team Sidorova to see who would represent the "Olympic Athletes from Russia" team at the Olympics. Team Moiseeva won the series four games to one, earning them the Olympic spot. At the 2018 Winter Olympics in PyeongChang, South Korea, the team struggled, finishing in a dismal ninth place with a 2–7 record. Team Moiseeva also represented Russia at the 2018 World Women's Curling Championship later that season, Arsenkina's first appearance at the championship. They had a much stronger tournament at the Worlds, qualifying for the playoffs with a 7–5 round robin record and defeating the United States to win the bronze medal. They represented Russia once more during the season in December at the Qinghai International. There, they went a perfect 9–0 up until the final game, where they lost to Switzerland's Ursi Hegner.

Arsenkina moved to join Team Alina Kovaleva for the 2018–19 season. The team also included Anastasia Bryzgalova at third, Ekaterina Kuzmina at lead, and alternate Uliana Vasilyeva. They found early success together, winning the Prestige Hotels & Resorts Curling Classic in September and finishing runner-up at the HDF Insurance Shoot-Out. They had another tour victory at the 2018 China Open and two more appearances in finals at the International ZO Women's Tournament and the Qinghai Curling Elite. They also competed in the second leg of the 2018–19 Curling World Cup, missing the playoffs. The team won the right to represent Russia at the 2018 European Curling Championships. They went 6–3 through the round robin, qualifying for the playoffs. They then lost both of their playoff games to Sweden's Anna Hasselborg and Germany's Daniela Jentsch, placing fourth. In February, they were challenged to a best-of-seven by Team Sidorova to determine who would represent Russia at the 2019 World Women's Curling Championship. Team Kovaleva won the series four games to one. At the Worlds, the team qualified for the playoffs in third place with a 9–3 record. They then lost their first playoff game to Japan's Seina Nakajima, eliminating them from contention. At the 2019 Champions Cup Slam event, they qualified for the playoffs for the first time before being eliminated in the quarterfinals by Kerri Einarson. To finish their season, they lost in the final of the 2019 WCT Arctic Cup to Scotland's Eve Muirhead.

Team Kovaleva had another successful tour season during the 2019–20 season, beginning at the 2019 Cargill Curling Training Centre Icebreaker, where they reached the semifinals. They also made the semifinals of the Booster Juice Shoot-Out and the Prestige Hotels & Resorts Curling Classic. At The Good Times Bonspiel, they finished runner-up to Kayla Skrlik. The team was once again challenged by Sidorova to determine who would represent Russia at the 2019 European Curling Championships, which Team Kovaleva won four games to two. At the Euros, the team had a strong preliminary round, finishing the round robin in second with an 8–1 record. Then, they once again lost both of their playoff games, finishing in fourth place. In December, the team won back-to-back tour events in China, the 2019 Changan Ford International Curling Elite and the 2019 China Open. They next competed in the 2020 Canadian Open Grand Slam event where they advanced to the semifinals for the first time before being defeated by Kim Min-ji. They once again defeated Team Sidorova at the 2020 Russian Women's World Qualification Event to represent Russia at the 2020 World Women's Curling Championship; however, the event got cancelled due to the COVID-19 pandemic.

Arsenkina and her team began the abbreviated 2020–21 season at the 2020 Russian Women's Curling Cup, where they went undefeated to claim the title. In December 2020, Team Kovaleva competed in the 2020 national championship as it had been postponed due to the pandemic. There, they finished second in the round robin with an 8–1 record. They then won the 1 vs. 2 page playoff and the final against Sidorova, winning the national title. A "curling bubble" was set up in Calgary, Canada in the spring, which hosted several events, including the 2021 World Women's Curling Championship and two slams. Team Kovaleva qualified for all three events, and added Yulia Portunova to their lineup due to a conflict with the 2021 Russian Women's Curling Championship where their regular third Maria Komarova was representing the team. At the 2021 Champions Cup, the team qualified for the playoffs before losing to Silvana Tirinzoni in the quarterfinals. They then missed the playoffs at the 2021 Players' Championship, finishing 2–3. The following week, the team represented the RCF (Russian Curling Federation) at the World Championships, as Russia is prohibited from competing under its flag or any national symbols at any Olympic Games or world championships until December 16, 2022. The team finished second through the round robin with an 11–2 record, giving them a direct bye to the semifinals. They then defeated Sweden's Anna Hasselborg 8–7 in the semifinal before losing the final to Switzerland's Silvana Tirinzoni after Kovaleva missed a freeze on her final shot.

In their first event of the 2021–22 season, Team Kovaleva went undefeated to claim the Saint Petersburg Classic. At the first Slam of the season, the 2021 Masters, the team reached the semifinals where they lost to Tracy Fleury. They also qualified for the playoffs at the 2021 National, however, lost to Silvana Tirinzoni in the quarterfinal round. At the 2021 European Curling Championships, Team Kovaleva went through the round robin with a 7–2 record, qualifying for the playoffs. They then lost to Sweden's Anna Hasselborg and Germany's Daniela Jentsch in the semifinal and bronze medal games, respectively, placing fourth. Because of their second place finish at the 2021 World Championship, Arsenkina and her teammates Alina Kovaleva, Yulia Portunova, Ekaterina Kuzmina and Maria Komarova qualified directly for the 2022 Winter Olympics where they represented the ROC (Russian Olympic Committee). At the Games, the team had a poor performance, finishing at the bottom of the standings with a 1–8 record. The Olympics would be the team's final event of the season as due to the Russian invasion of Ukraine, all Russian teams were banned from participating in any World Curling Championships in 2022. The team was also excluded from the final two Grand Slams of the season, the 2022 Players' Championship and the 2022 Champions Cup. At the end of the season, Team Kovaleva competed in the 2022 Nornickel Curling Cup, held only between Russian teams. There, they finished in third place.

Russia's ban from World Curling events continued into the 2022–23 season. Despite this, Team Kovaleva had a strong season within Russia, including first place finishes at the Russian Women's Curling Cup, the Saint Petersburg Classic and the Murom Classic. At the Russian Women's Curling Championship, the team came in second place to the Anna Sidorova rink. In late May 2023, Arsenkina announced her retirement from curling, citing Russia's ongoing ban from WCF international competitions as one of the deciding factors.

== Personal life ==
Arsenkina was previously a full-time curler. She started her sports career as a figure skater, but when she was twelve, a leg injury forced her to give up the sport. At that point, she took up curling. She graduated from the Moscow Institute of Electronic Technology in 2013.

== Grand Slam record ==
Key
C	Champion
F	Lost in Final
SF	Lost in Semifinal
QF	Lost in Quarterfinals
R16	Lost in the round of 16
Q	Did not advance to playoffs
T2	Played in Tier 2 event
DNP	Did not participate in event
N/A	Not a Grand Slam event that season

Event	2016–17	2017–18	2018–19	2019–20	2020–21	2021–22
Masters	DNP	DNP	DNP	DNP	N/A	SF
The National	DNP	DNP	DNP	DNP	N/A	QF
Canadian Open	DNP	DNP	DNP	SF	N/A	N/A
Players'	DNP	DNP	DNP	N/A	Q	DNP
Champions Cup	Q	DNP	QF	N/A	QF	DNP

=== Former events ===
Event	2012–13
Colonial Square	Q

== Teams ==
Season	Skip	Third	Second	Lead	Alternate
2006–07	Olga Jarkova	Nkeirouka Ezekh	Angela Tyuvaeva	Olga Zjablikova	Galina Arsenkina
2007–08	Olga Zharkova	Nkeirouka Ezekh	Anna Sidorova	Galina Arsenkina	Olga Zjablikova
2008–09	Margarita Fomina	Ekaterina Galkina	Anna Sidorova	Daria Kozlova	Galina Arsenkina
2008–09	Anna Sidorova	Viktoria Makarshina	Olga Zjablikova	Galina Arsenkina	Anna Lobova
2009–10	Anna Sidorova	Ekaterina Antonova	Olga Zyablikova	Galina Arsenkina	
2009–10	Anna Sidorova	Margarita Fomina	Ekaterina Galkina	Galina Arsenkina	Ekaterina Antonova
2010–11	Anna Sidorova	Olga Zyablikova	Ekaterina Antonova	Galina Arsenkina	Victoria Moiseeva
2011–12	Olga Zyablikova	Ekaterina Antonova	Victoria Moiseeva	Galina Arsenkina	
2011–12	Anna Sidorova	Olga Zyablikova	Victoria Moiseeva	Galina Arsenkina	Alexandra Saitova
2012–13	Ekaterina Antonova (Fourth)	Victoria Moiseeva (Skip)	Galina Arsenkina	Alexandra Saitova	Alina Kovaleva
2014–15	Olga Zharkova	Yulia Portunova	Galina Arsenkina	Julia Guzieva	
2016–17	Victoria Moiseeva	Uliana Vasilyeva	Galina Arsenkina	Julia Guzieva	Yulia Portunova
2016–17	Victoria Moiseeva	Uliana Vasilyeva	Galina Arsenkina	Yulia Portunova	Maria Duyunova
2017–18	Victoria Moiseeva	Uliana Vasilyeva	Galina Arsenkina	Julia Guzieva	Yulia Portunova
2017–18	Victoria Moiseeva	Yulia Portunova	Galina Arsenkina	Julia Guzieva	Anna Sidorova
2018–19	Alina Kovaleva	Anastasia Bryzgalova	Galina Arsenkina	Ekaterina Kuzmina	Uliana Vasilyeva
2019–20	Alina Kovaleva	Maria Komarova	Galina Arsenkina	Ekaterina Kuzmina	Anastasiia Danshina
2020–21	Alina Kovaleva	Maria Komarova	Galina Arsenkina	Ekaterina Kuzmina	Vera Tiuliakova
2020–21	Alina Kovaleva	Yulia Portunova	Galina Arsenkina	Ekaterina Kuzmina	Maria Komarova
2021–22	Alina Kovaleva	Yulia Portunova	Galina Arsenkina	Ekaterina Kuzmina	Maria Komarova
2022–23	Alina Kovaleva	Galina Arsenkina	Maria Komarova	Ekaterina Kuzmina	Vera Tiuliakova
