= Sydor =

Sydor is a Polish and Ukrainian surname and given name. Notable people with the surname include:

== Given name ==
- Sydor Rey (1908–1979), Polish poet and novelist

== Surname ==
- Andrzej Sydor (born 1937), Polish chess player
- Alison Sydor (born 1966), Canadian cross country mountain cyclist
- Darryl Sydor (born 1972), Canadian professional ice hockey defenceman
- Dmytro Sydor (born 1955), Ukrainian/Rusyn priest and political activist
- Michel Sydor (1929–2014), French serial killer

== Nickname ==
- Nickname of Oleksandr Sydorenko (born 1960), Soviet swimmer

== See also ==
- Sydor, an Elfquest character
- Sidor
- Sydir
