= Sidorova (Leninskoye Rural Settlement), Kudymkarsky District, Perm Krai =

Sidorova Сидорова
- Village
- Location within Perm Krai Location within Russia
- Coordinates: 58°43′N 54°46′E
- Country: Russia
- Region: Perm Krai
- District: Kudymkarsky District
- Time zone: UTC+5:00

Sidorova (Russian: Сидорова) is a rural locality (a village) in Leninskoye Rural Settlement, Kudymkarsky District, Perm Krai, Russia. The population was 21 as of 2010.

== Geography ==
It is located 39 km south from Kudymkar.
