= Sydir =

Sydir (Сидір) is a Ukrainian given name and equivalent of Isidore. Russian-language equivalent is Sidor.

- Sydir Bily
- Sydir Holubovych
- Sydir Kizin
- Sydir Kovpak
- Sydir Tverdokhlib
- Sydir Vorobkevych
