= Bolshaya Sidorova =

Bolshaya Sidorova Большая Сидорова
- Village
- Location within Perm Krai Location within Russia
- Coordinates: 59°05′N 54°06′E
- Country: Russia
- Region: Perm Krai
- District: Kudymkarsky District
- Time zone: UTC+5:00

Bolshaya Sidorova (Russian: Большая Сидорова) is a rural locality (a village) in Beloyevskoye Rural Settlement, Kudymkarsky District, Perm Krai, Russia. The population was 109 as of 2010. There are 6 streets.

== Geography ==
Bolshaya Sidorova is located 43 km northwest of Kudymkar (the district's administrative centre) by road. Malaya Sidorova is the nearest rural locality.
