= Olga Sidorova (trapezist) =

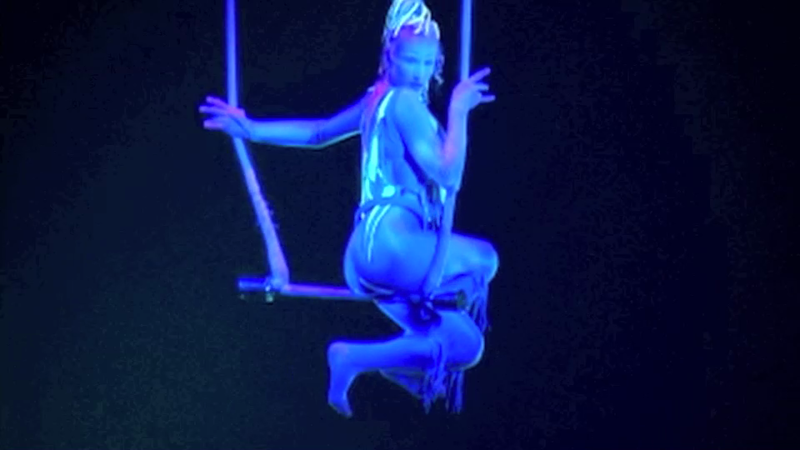
Olga Sidorova - Saltimbanco

Olga Sidorova (born Ishim, Tyumen Oblast, Siberia, 1974) is a Russian-born trapezist.

== Career ==
Sidorova trained for solo trapeze at the Moscow Circus School under Genady Totukhov. Together they developed a double standing pirouette, which Sidorova was the first trapezist to perform onstage. She received the prestigious Rumyantsev-Karandash award for the most innovative act of the year, and was invited to the International Circus Festival of Monte Carlo, but did not attend.

Sidorova performed solo trapeze with the Moscow Circus, the British-based Billy Smart's Circus (in 1998), and the Australian show Inneurve on the Gold Coast. She has performed in Dubai, and was the first trapezist to perform in Mauritius. In November, 2000 she joined the Cirque du Soleil's show Saltimbanco, adding her own techniques to an act created by Franco Dragone and Shana Carroll.

== Aerial coach ==
After retiring from circus performance, Sidorova became an aerial coach for the National Institute of Circus Arts in Melbourne, Australia. She became an Australian citizen and started her own aerial arts creation company, Dancing in the Air, headquartered in Sydney. She also served as Circus Director for Cirque Imaginaire's show Storm. She runs the Trapeze Beach Camp in New South Wales, Australia. Her work has influenced other trapezists around the world.

== Dreams of the Solo Trapeze: Offstage with the Cirque du Soleil ==
Her life and career are profiled in the book "Dreams of the Solo Trapeze: Offstage with the Cirque du Soleil", by Mark Schreiber. Follow the performers in Cirque du Soleil’s Saltimbanco in the only behind-the-scenes book ever written about the world famous company.

== Bibliography ==
- Mark Schreiber. Dreams of the Solo Trapeze: Offstage with the Cirque du Soleil. Canal House, 2005.
