= Sidorovo, Syamzhensky District, Vologda Oblast =

Sidorovo Сидорово
- Village
- Location within Vologda Oblast Location within Russia
- Coordinates: 59°56′N 41°33′E
- Country: Russia
- Region: Vologda Oblast
- District: Syamzhensky District
- Time zone: UTC+3:00

Sidorovo (Russian: Сидорово) is a rural locality (a village) in Korobitsynskoye Rural Settlement, Syamzhensky District, Vologda Oblast, Russia. The population was 22 as of 2002.

== Geography ==
Sidorovo is located 50 km southeast of Syamzha (the district's administrative centre) by road. Yezdunya is the nearest rural locality.
