= Sidorovo, Gryazovetsky District, Vologda Oblast =

Sidorovo Сидорово
- Selo
- Location within Vologda Oblast Location within Russia
- Coordinates: 58°45′N 40°58′E
- Country: Russia
- Region: Vologda Oblast
- District: Gryazovetsky District
- Time zone: UTC+3:00

Sidorovo (Russian: Сидорово) is a rural locality (a selo) and the administrative center of Sidorovskoye Rural Settlement, Gryazovetsky District, Vologda Oblast, Russia. The population was 645 as of 2002. There are 7 streets.

== Geography ==
Sidorovo is located 50 km southeast of Gryazovets (the district's administrative centre) by road. Bakshino is the nearest rural locality.
