= Vitaliy Sidorov =

Vitaliy Sidorov may refer to:

- Vitaliy Sidorov (discus thrower) (born 1970), Ukrainian-Russian discus thrower
- Vitaliy Sidorov (footballer) (born 1990), Russian footballer
