= Maksim Sidorov =

Maksim Sidorov may refer to:

- Maksim Sidorov (shot putter) (born 1986), a Russian shot putter
- Maksim Sidorov (footballer, born 1991), Russian football player
- Maksim Sidorov (footballer, born 1998), Russian football player
