= Malaya Sidorova =

Malaya Sidorova Малая Сидорова
- Village
- Location within Perm Krai Location within Russia
- Coordinates: 59°06′N 54°05′E
- Country: Russia
- Region: Perm Krai
- District: Kudymkarsky District
- Time zone: UTC+5:00

Malaya Sidorova (Russian: Малая Сидорова) is a rural locality (a village) in Beloyevskoye Rural Settlement, Kudymkarsky District, Perm Krai, Russia. The population was 43 as of 2010.

== Geography ==
Malaya Sidorova is located 44 km northwest of Kudymkar (the district's administrative centre) by road. Bolshaya Sidorova is the nearest rural locality.
