= Sidorovo, Ustyuzhensky District, Vologda Oblast =

Sidorovo Сидорово
- Village
- Location within Vologda Oblast Location within Russia
- Coordinates: 58°37′N 36°20′E
- Country: Russia
- Region: Vologda Oblast
- District: Ustyuzhensky District
- Time zone: UTC+3:00

Sidorovo (Russian: Сидорово) is a rural locality (a village) in Nikolskoye Rural Settlement, Ustyuzhensky District, Vologda Oblast, Russia. The population was 6 as of 2002.

== Geography ==
Sidorovo is located 46 km (29 mi) southwest of Ustyuzhna (the district's administrative centre) by road. Vorontsy is the nearest rural locality.
