= Sidorovo, Vashkinsky District, Vologda Oblast =

Sidorovo Сидорово
- Village
- Location within Vologda Oblast Location within Russia
- Coordinates: 60°19′N 37°41′E
- Country: Russia
- Region: Vologda Oblast
- District: Vashkinsky District
- Time zone: UTC+3:00

Sidorovo (Russian: Сидорово) is a rural locality (a village) in Kisnemskoye Rural Settlement, Vashkinsky District, Vologda Oblast, Russia. The population was 16 as of 2002.

== Geography ==
Sidorovo is located 25 km northwest of Lipin Bor (the district's administrative centre) by road. Monastyrskaya is the nearest rural locality.
