= Alina Kovaleva =

Russian curler (born 1993)

Alina Kovaleva Алина Ковалёва
- Curler
- Born: 18 February 1993 (age 33); Slantsy, Leningrad Oblast, Russia

Team
- Curling club: Adamant CC, Saint Petersburg, RUS
- Skip: Alina Kovaleva
- Third: Yulia Portunova
- Second: Galina Arsenkina
- Lead: Ekaterina Kuzmina
- Alternate: Maria Komarova
- Mixed doubles partner: Sergey Glukhov

Curling career
- Member Association: Russia
- World Championship: 4 (2016, 2017, 2019, 2021)
- World Mixed Doubles Championship: 1 (2011)
- European Championship: 5 (2015, 2017, 2018, 2019, 2021)
- Olympic: 1 (2022)
Medal record
Women's Curling
Representing Russia
World Curling Championships
Silver medal – second place	2017 Beijing
Bronze medal – third place	2016 Swift Current
European Curling Championships
Gold medal – first place	2015 Esbjerg
World Junior Curling Championships
Gold medal – first place	2013 Sochi
Bronze medal – third place	2014 Flims
World Mixed Doubles Curling Championship
Silver medal – second place	2011 St. Paul
Representing RCF
World Curling Championships
Silver medal – second place	2021 Calgary

Alina Romanovna Kovaleva (Russian: Алина Романовна Ковалёва; born 18 February 1993) is a Russian curler from Saint Petersburg. Her major achievement to date was winning the 2015 European Curling Championships as alternate. Kovaleva is Merited Master of Sports of Russia (2016).

== Career ==
Kovaleva practiced curling in her school years in her hometown Slantsy. She then moved to St. Petersburg to the Sports School of Olympic Reserve, No. 2. After three years of curling, she and her coach Alexey Tselousov became national champions and silver medalists at the 2011 World Mixed Doubles Curling Championship. Since then, she has been active in mixed tournaments.

From 2013 to 2014, she was a member of the national junior team, winning the 2013 World Junior Curling Championships in Sochi and the 2014 World Junior Curling Championships in Flims.

Kovaleva plays for Adamant in St. Petersburg as a skip. As a member of the club, she won the 2013 Russian Cup and became the silver medalist at the 2015 Russian Women's Curling Championships, losing 7-4 in the final to Moskva 1.

In November 2015, Kovaleva debuted as the alternate for the national team at the 2015 European Curling Championships in Esbjerg, replacing Ekaterina Galkina who took a break from curling. The Russians won the tournament; it was Kovaleva's first gold medal at the European Championships. She and her team won the 2016 bronze as the alternate and the 2017 World Women's Curling Championship silver as the second. She was also the alternate at the 2017 European Curling Championships, where her team finished 5th.

In 2018, Kovaleva turned to playing as skip. Her first tour win as a skip came at the 2018 Prestige Hotels & Resorts Curling Classic. Later that season, she also won the 2018 China Open and the Russian Curling Cup. Elsewhere, she skipped the Russian team at the 2018 European Curling Championships, finishing fourth. She also skipped the Russian team at the 2019 World Women's Curling Championship, where she led her team to a 5th place finish. At the end of the season, she skipped in her first Grand Slam event at the 2019 Champions Cup, where she made the quarterfinals.

In 2019, Kovaleva won the 2019 Russian Women's Curling Championship for the first time.

Team Kovaleva began the abbreviated 2020–21 season at the 2020 Russian Women's Curling Cup, where they went undefeated to claim the title. In December 2020, they competed in the 2020 national championship as it had been postponed due to the COVID-19 pandemic. There, they finished second in the round robin with an 8–1 record. They then defeated Team Anna Sidorova in both the 1 vs. 2 page playoff and final to claim the national title. A "curling bubble" was set up in Calgary, Canada in the spring, which hosted several events, including the 2021 World Women's Curling Championship and two slams. Team Kovaleva qualified for the playoffs at the first slam, the 2021 Champions Cup, before losing to Silvana Tirinzoni in the quarterfinals. They then missed the playoffs at the 2021 Players' Championship, finishing 2–3. The following week, the team represented the RCF (Russian Curling Federation) at the World Championships, as Russia is prohibited from competing under its flag or any national symbols at any Olympic Games or world championships until 16 December 2022. The team finished second through the round robin with an 11–2 record, giving them a direct bye to the semifinals. They then defeated Sweden's Anna Hasselborg 8–7 in the semifinal before losing the final to Switzerland's Silvana Tirinzoni after Kovaleva missed a freeze on her final shot.

In their first event of the 2021–22 season, Team Kovaleva went undefeated to claim the Saint Petersburg Classic. At the first Slam of the season, the 2021 Masters, the team reached the semifinals where they lost to Tracy Fleury. They also qualified for the playoffs at the 2021 National, however, lost to Silvana Tirinzoni in the quarterfinal round. At the 2021 European Curling Championships, Team Kovaleva went through the round robin with a 7–2 record, qualifying for the playoffs. They then lost to Sweden's Anna Hasselborg and Germany's Daniela Jentsch in the semifinal and bronze medal games, respectively, placing fourth. Because of their second place finish at the 2021 World Championship, Kovaleva and her teammates Yulia Portunova, Galina Arsenkina, Ekaterina Kuzmina and Maria Komarova qualified directly for the 2022 Winter Olympics where they represented the ROC (Russian Olympic Committee). At the Games, the team had a poor performance, finishing at the bottom of the standings with a 1–8 record. The Olympics would be the team's final event of the season as due to the Russian invasion of Ukraine, all Russian teams were banned from participating in any World Curling Championships in 2022. The team was also excluded from the final two Grand Slams of the season, the 2022 Players' Championship and the 2022 Champions Cup. At the end of the season, Team Kovaleva competed in the 2022 Nornickel Curling Cup, held only between Russian teams. There, they finished in third place.

== Grand Slam record ==
Key
C	Champion
F	Lost in Final
SF	Lost in Semifinal
QF	Lost in Quarterfinals
R16	Lost in the round of 16
Q	Did not advance to playoffs
T2	Played in Tier 2 event
DNP	Did not participate in event
N/A	Not a Grand Slam event that season

Event	2015–16	2016–17	2017–18	2018–19	2019–20	2020–21	2021–22
Masters	QF	DNP	Q	DNP	DNP	N/A	SF
Tour Challenge	Q	DNP	DNP	DNP	DNP	N/A	N/A
The National	DNP	DNP	DNP	DNP	DNP	N/A	QF
Canadian Open	QF	DNP	DNP	DNP	SF	N/A	N/A
Players'	Q	DNP	DNP	DNP	N/A	Q	DNP
Champions Cup	DNP	DNP	DNP	QF	N/A	QF	DNP

== Awards ==
- Gratitude by the Sports Minister of the Russian Federation (4 December 2015) – for the successful appearance as a member of the national curling team at the European Curling Championships in Esbjerg (Denmark).
