= Anna Sidorova =

Russian curler

Anna Sidorova Анна Сидорова
- Curler
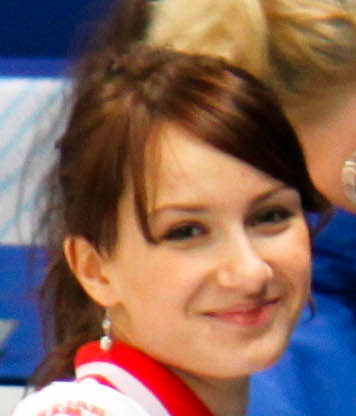
- Born: 6 February 1991 (age 35); Moscow, Russian SFSR, Soviet Union

Team
- Curling club: Moskvitch CC, Moscow, RUS
- Skip: Anna Sidorova
- Third: Yulia Portunova
- Second: Liudmila Privivkova
- Lead: Maria Ignatenko
- Alternate: Sofia Tkach

Curling career
- Member Association: Russia
- World Championship: 9 (2010, 2011, 2012, 2013, 2014, 2015, 2016, 2017, 2018)
- European Championship: 8 (2009, 2010, 2011, 2012, 2013, 2014, 2015, 2017)
- Olympic: 2 (2010, 2014)
Medal record
Women's curling
Representing Russia
World Championships
Silver medal – second place	2017 Beijing
Bronze medal – third place	2014 Saint John
Bronze medal – third place	2015 Sapporo
Bronze medal – third place	2016 Swift Current
Bronze medal – third place	2018 North Bay
European Championships
Gold medal – first place	2012 Karlstad
Gold medal – first place	2015 Esbjerg
Silver medal – second place	2014 Champéry
Bronze medal – third place	2011 Moscow
World Junior Championships
Bronze medal – third place	2011 Perth
Bronze medal – third place	2012 Östersund
Winter Universiade
Gold medal – first place	2013 Trentino
Gold medal – first place	2015 Granada
Silver medal – second place	2011 Erzurum

Anna Vladimirovna Sidorova (Russian: А́нна Влади́мировна Си́дорова; born 6 February 1991) is a Russian curler. She currently skips her own team. Sidorova was the skip of the Russian team that won bronze medals at the World Women's Curling Championships from 2014 to 2016 and the silver medal at the 2017 World Women's Curling Championship.

== Career ==
As a junior, Sidorova represented Russia at four World Junior Curling Championships (2009, 2010, 2011 & 2012). She won the bronze medal as the skip of the Russian junior team in 2011 and 2012.

At the age of 19, Sidorova was named late to the Russian Olympic Team for the 2010 Winter Olympics in Vancouver, British Columbia, Canada as the team's third. Originally Olga Jarkova was named to the team; however, Jarkova was taken out at the last minute and Sidorova was added to the team. For the fifth match, against the U.S., and the sixth match, against Switzerland, Sidorova replaced Ludmila Privivkova as skip. She also replaced Ludmila Privivkova in the eighth Game against China as the Skip. Sidorova thus became the youngest skip at the games, since British skip Eve Muirhead, while also 19 years old at the time, is ten months older.

In addition to playing third on the Russian Olympic Team, Sidorova has also skipped her own team on the World Curling Tour (with Olga Jarkova throwing second stones). She joined Privivkova's team in 2011. In 2012, Sidorova began skipping the team, with Privivkova at third. The team won a gold medal at the European Curling Championships in 2012 with their new lineup.

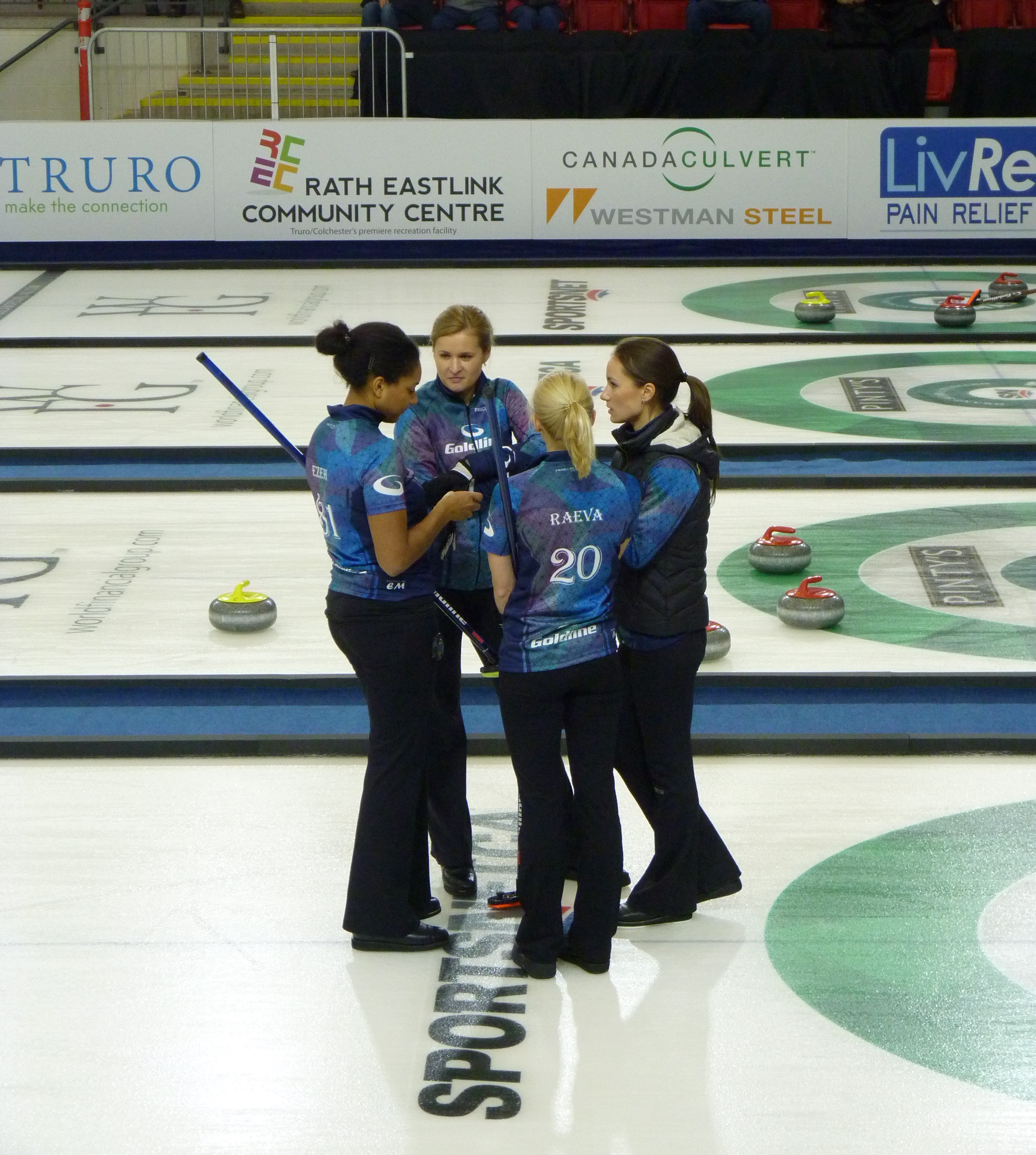
Team Sidorova at the 2015 Masters Grand Slam of Curling event in Truro, Nova Scotia.

Sidorova was the skip of team Russia at the 2014 Winter Olympics. She led the team to a ninth-place finish, with a 3–6 record. She also skipped Team Russia at the 2014 World Women's Curling Championship held from 15 to 23 March in Saint John, New Brunswick, Canada. Her team finished the round robin with an 8–3 record, earning the third seed in the playoffs. Team Russia lost to Team Korea in the 3 vs. 4 playoff game, but in a rematch the following day Sidorova and her teammates defeated Team Korea to win the bronze medal. It was the first medal for Russia in the history of the world women's curling championships.

She then followed up with bronze medals at both the 2015 and 2016 world women's curling championships, and a gold medal at the 2015 European Curling Championships in the meantime. She just narrowly missed playing for gold for the first time at the 2016 Worlds, losing to Team Japan on the last shot of the semifinal. After defeating Canada's Chelsea Carey for her third straight bronze, she spoke of feeling encouraged by getting closer to the gold or silver each time, and hoped that 2017 and 2018 would be her years. She made her first World Championship final at the 2017 Worlds, but settled for silver after losing to Canada's Rachel Homan 8–3 in the final.

Sidorova's rink was initially chosen to represent Russia at the 2018 Winter Olympics, but poor play during the 2017–18 season forced the Russian Curling Federation to hold a best-of-seven Olympic Trials against St. Peterburg's Victoria Moiseeva rink to see who would represent the "Olympic Athletes from Russia" team at the Olympics. Sidorova lost the series in five games.

Sidorova was the alternate for the Russian team at the 2018 Worlds, where the Russian team would take home the bronze medal. Sidorova represented Russia at three legs of the 2018–19 Curling World Cup. In the first leg she went 3-3, at the third leg she went 4-2 just missing the final by one point. At the Grand Final, she went 4-2 once again just missing the final.

Team Sidorova started the 2019–20 season at the 2019 Cameron's Brewing Oakville Fall Classic where they lost in the qualification game. They next played in the Stu Sells Oakville Tankard where they lost to Anna Hasselborg in the final. They missed the playoffs at the inaugural WCT Uiseong International Curling Cup before having a quarterfinal finish at the Women's Masters Basel. Despite their early successes on tour, Team Sidorova lost the Russian qualifier for the 2019 European Curling Championships to Alina Kovaleva in six games. They turned things around however the following month at the Karuizawa International where they went an undefeated 7–0 throughout the event and defeated Satsuki Fujisawa 5–4 in the final. They also had a semifinal finish at the Glynhill Ladies International and a quarterfinal finish at the International Bernese Ladies Cup. Their final event of the season was at the 2020 Russian Women's World Qualification Event where they would once again lose to the Kovaleva rink in a best of seven series.

Sidorova and her team began the abbreviated 2020–21 season at the 2020 Russian Women's Curling Cup where they went undefeated until the final where they lost to Team Kovaleva. In December 2020, Team Sidorova competed in the 2020 national championship as it had been postponed due to the COVID-19 pandemic. There, they topped the round robin with an 8–1 record, defeating the Kovaleva rink in their final round robin draw. They then lost both the 1 vs. 2 page playoff and final to Kovaleva, settling for silver. In April 2021, her team competed in the 2021 national championship where they lost in the final to the Olga Jarkova rink. Sidorova ended her season at the 2021 WCT Arctic Cup mixed doubles tournament where she competed with Alexey Timofeev. The pair finished 2–2 through the round robin, not enough to advance to the playoffs.

== Personal life ==
She was a figure skater until age 13, when a leg injury forced her to give up the sport. At that point, she took up curling. Sidorova was a student in 2016. She attended Lesgaft National State University of Physical Education, Sport and Health.

== Grand Slam record ==
Sidorova's Russian rink had a fairly successful Grand Slam season in 2012–13, making it as far as the semi-finals at the 2012 Colonial Square Ladies Classic. She made it to her first Grand Slam finals at the 2015 Players' Championship, losing to Eve Muirhead.

Key
C	Champion
F	Lost in Final
SF	Lost in Semifinal
QF	Lost in Quarterfinals
R16	Lost in the round of 16
Q	Did not advance to playoffs
T2	Played in Tier 2 event
DNP	Did not participate in event
N/A	Not a Grand Slam event that season

Event	2012–13	2013–14	2014–15	2015–16	2016–17	2017–18
Tour Challenge	N/A	N/A	N/A	Q	DNP	T2
Masters	Q	Q	Q	QF	Q	Q
The National	N/A	N/A	N/A	DNP	QF	DNP
Canadian Open	N/A	N/A	DNP	QF	Q	DNP
Players'	QF	DNP	F	Q	DNP	DNP

=== Former events ===
Event	2011–12	2012–13	2013–14
Autumn Gold	Q	DNP	Q
Manitoba Liquor & Lotteries	DNP	DNP	QF
Colonial Square	N/A	SF	DNP

== Teams ==
Season	Skip	Third	Second	Lead	Alternate
2008–09	Margarita Fomina	Ekaterina Galkina	Anna Sidorova	Daria Kozlova	
2009–10	Anna Sidorova	Ekaterina Antonova	Olga Zyablikova	Galina Arsenkina	
2010–11	Anna Sidorova	Olga Zyablikova	Ekaterina Antonova	Galina Arsenkina	
2011–12	Liudmila Privivkova	Anna Sidorova	Nkeirouka Ezekh	Ekaterina Galkina	
2012–13	Anna Sidorova	Liudmila Privivkova	Margarita Fomina	Ekaterina Galkina	Nkeirouka Ezekh
2013–14	Anna Sidorova	Margarita Fomina	Alexandra Saitova	Ekaterina Galkina	Nkeirouka Ezekh
2014–15	Anna Sidorova	Margarita Fomina	Alexandra Saitova	Ekaterina Galkina	
2015–16	Anna Sidorova	Margarita Fomina	Alexandra Raeva	Nkeirouka Ezekh	Alina Kovaleva
2016–17	Anna Sidorova	Margarita Fomina	Alexandra Raeva	Nkeirouka Ezekh	Alina Kovaleva
2017–18	Anna Sidorova	Margarita Fomina	Alexandra Raeva	Nkeirouka Ezekh	Alina Kovaleva
2018–19	Anna Sidorova	Margarita Fomina	Alexandra Raeva; Yulia Portunova	Nkeirouka Ezekh; Julia Guzieva	
2019–20	Anna Sidorova	Yulia Portunova	Olga Kotelnikova	Julia Guzieva	
2020–21	Anna Sidorova	Yulia Portunova	Liudmila Privivkova	Maria Ignatenko	Sofia Tkach
