= Ice Cube Curling Center =

Multipurpose arena in Sochi, Russia

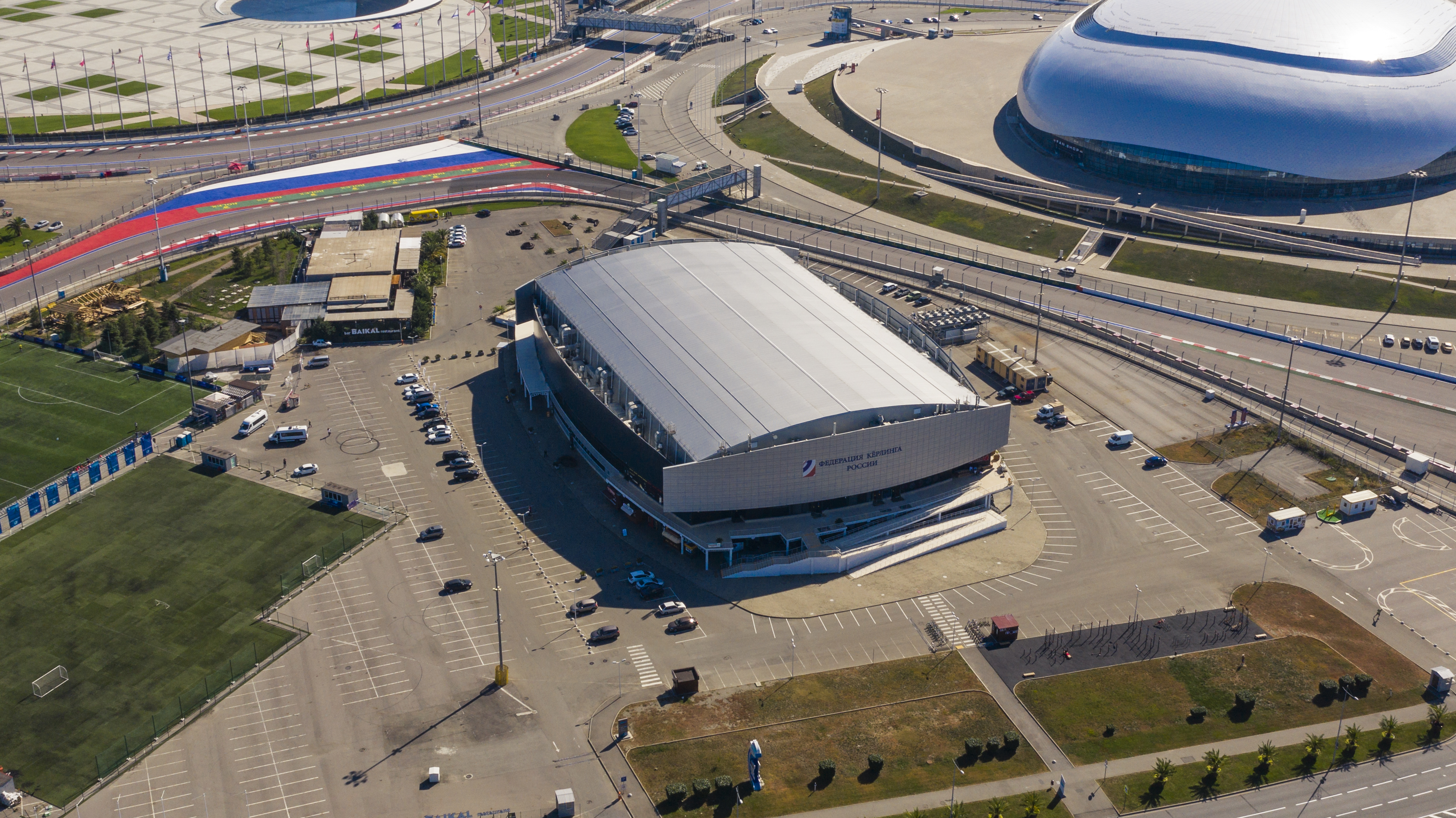
- Interactive map of Ice Cube Curling Center
- Location: Sochi, Russia
- Coordinates: 43°24′24″N 39°56′57″E
- Capacity: 3,000 Olympic Mode

Construction
- Opened: 2012

Tenants
- 2014 Winter Olympics (curling); 2014 Winter Paralympics (curling); 2017 Winter Military World Games

The Ice Cube Curling Center (Russian: Керлинговый Центр Ледяной куб) is a 3,000-seat multi-purpose arena in Sochi, Russia, that opened in 2012. It is a component of the Sochi Olympic Park.

It hosted all the curling events at the 2014 Winter Olympics and the wheelchair curling events at the 2014 Winter Paralympics. It cost $14.0 million to build the venue, including the temporary works for the Olympics and Paralympics. It opened in 2012. After the 2014 games, it will remain a sports arena. The venue is a portable venue, designed so that it could possibly be re-located after the end of the games.

== See also ==
- List of indoor arenas in Russia
