= Yana Nekrasova =

Russian curler

- Curler ♀
- Born: 10 February 1976 (age 50); Leningrad, USSR

Team
- Curling club: CSKA, Saint Petersburg

Curling career
- Member Association: Russia
- World Championship: 4 (2001, 2002, 2003, 2005)
- World Mixed Doubles Championship: 2 (2010, 2013)
- European Championship: 8 (1996, 1998, 1999, 2000, 2001, 2002, 2003, 2004)
- Olympic: 2 (2002, 2006)
- Other appearances: European Mixed Championship: 2 (2008, 2009), Winter Universiade: 1 (2003)
Medal record
Curling
World Mixed Doubles Championship
Gold medal – first place	2010 Chelyabinsk
Winter Universiade
Gold medal – first place	2003 Tarvisio

Yana Anatolyevna Nekrasova (Russian: Я́на Анато́льевна Некра́сова; born 10 February 1976 in Leningrad, USSR) is a Russian curler, a 2010 World mixed doubles champion, a 2003 Winter Universiade champion and a four-time Russian women's champion (1996, 1997, 1998, 2000).

She played at the 2002 Winter Olympics, where the Russian team finished in tenth place, and at the 2006 Winter Olympics, where the Russian team finished in fifth place.

== Teams ==
=== Women's ===
Season	Skip	Third	Second	Lead	Alternate	Coach	Events
1996–97	Tatiana Smirnova	Irina Kolesnikova	Yana Nekrasova	Marina Tcherepanova			ECC 1996 (13th)
1998–99	Tatiana Smirnova	Irina Kolesnikova	Yana Nekrasova	Marina Tcherepanova			ECC 1998 (11th)
1999–00	Olga Jarkova (fourth)	Nina Golovtchenko (skip)	Yana Nekrasova	Irina Kolesnikova	Tatiana Smirnova	Olga Andrianova	ECC 1999 (8th)
2000–01	Olga Jarkova (fourth)	Nina Golovtchenko (skip)	Anastassia Skoultan	Nkeiruka Ezekh	Yana Nekrasova	Olga Andrianova	ECC 2000 (7th)
2000–01	Nina Golovtchenko	Olga Jarkova	Nkeiruka Ezekh	Yana Nekrasova	Anastassia Skoultan	Olga Andrianova	WCC 2001 (9th)
2001–02	Olga Jarkova	Yana Nekrasova	Nkeiruka Ezekh	Angela Tuvaeva		Olga Andrianova	ECC 2001 (7th)
2001–02	Olga Jarkova	Nkeiruka Ezekh	Yana Nekrasova	Anastassia Skoultan	Angela Tuvaeva	Olga Andrianova	WOG 2002 (10th); WCC 2002 (7th)
2002–03	Olga Jarkova	Nkeiruka Ezekh	Yana Nekrasova	Anastassia Skoultan	Ludmila Privivkova (ECC, WCC); Anna Rubtsova (WUG)	Olga Andrianova	ECC 2002 (4th); WUG 2003 (gold); WCC 2003 (6th)
2003–04	Olga Jarkova	Nkeiruka Ezekh	Yana Nekrasova	Ludmila Privivkova	Angela Tuvaeva	Olga Andrianova	ECC 2003 (8th)
2004–05	Olga Jarkova	Nkeiruka Ezekh	Yana Nekrasova	Ekaterina Galkina	Ludmila Privivkova	Olga Andrianova	ECC 2004 (4th)
2004–05	Ludmila Privivkova	Nkeiruka Ezekh	Yana Nekrasova	Ekaterina Galkina	Olga Jarkova	Olga Andrianova	WCC 2005 (5th)
2005–06	Ludmila Privivkova	Nkeiruka Ezekh	Olga Jarkova	Ekaterina Galkina	Yana Nekrasova	Olga Andrianova, Yory Andrianov	WOG 2006 (5th)
2018–19	Sophia Orazalina	Yana Nekrasova	Irina Belyayeva	Mariia Arkhipova	Marina Maleeva		RWCC 2019 (10th)

=== Mixed ===
Season	Skip	Third	Second	Lead	Alternate	Events
2008–09	Alexander Kirikov	Yana Nekrasova	Petr Dron	Galina Arsenkina	Victor Kornev, Anna Sidorova	EMxCC 2008 (4th)
2009–10	Yana Nekrasova	Roman Kutuzov	Daria Kozlova	Alexander Kozyrev	Victor Kornev, Alexandra Saitova	EMxCC 2009 (6th)

=== Mixed doubles ===
Season	Male	Female	Coach	Events
2009–10	Petr Dron	Yana Nekrasova	Irina Kolesnikova	WMDCC 2010 (gold)
2011–12	Alexey Kamnev	Yana Nekrasova		RMDCC 2012 (bronze)
2012–13	Alexey Kamnev	Yana Nekrasova	Irina Kolesnikova (WMDCC)	RMDCC 2013 (gold); WMDCC 2013 (9th)
