= Curling at the Winter World University Games =

- Events: 3 (men: 1; women: 1; mixed: 1)

Games
- 1959; 1960; 1961; 1962; 1963; 1964; 1965; 1966; 1967; 1968; 1970; 1970; 1973; 1972; 1975; 1975; 1977; 1978; 1979; 1981; 1983; 1985; 1987; 1989; 1991; 1993; 1995; 1997; 1999; 2001; 2003; 2005; 2007; 2009; 2011; 2013; 2015; 2017; 2019; 2023; 2025

Curling has been a part of the Winter Universiade since it was featured was optional sport in the 2003 Winter Universiade in Tarvisio. It became a compulsory sport as of the 2007 Winter Universiade in Turin.

== Results ==
=== Men's ===
Year	Location	Gold medal game			Bronze medal game
Year	Location	Gold medalist	Score	Silver medalist	Bronze medalist	Score	Fourth place
2003 details	(Italy) Tarvisio	Canada; Mike McEwen; Denni Neufeld; Sheldon Wettig; Nolan Thiessen; Marc Kennedy	6–4	Switzerland; Cyril Stutz; Urs Eichhorn; Christian Haller; Yves Hess; Reto Herger	South Korea; Lee Dong-keun; Park Jae-cheol; Kim Soo-hyuk; Choi Min-suk; Ko Seung-wan	6–4	Great Britain; Paul Stevenson; Iain Kilgour; Fraser Watt; Gavin Baird; David Owen
2007 details	(Italy) Pinerolo	United States; John Shuster; Jeff Isaacson; Chris Plys; Shane McKinlay; Kevin Johnson	9–4	Great Britain; John Hamilton; Andrew Craigie; Iain Chalmers; Graeme Copland; Ross Paterson	Sweden; Sebastian Kraupp; Daniel Tenn; Fredrik Lindberg; Viktor Kjäll	9–4	Canada; Steve Laycock; Ryan Deis; Matthew Ryback; Drew Heidt
2009 details	(China) Harbin	Sweden; Niklas Edin; Sebastian Kraupp; Fredrik Lindberg; Viktor Kjäll	8–7	Norway; Thomas Løvold; Christoffer Svae; Hans Tømmervold; Anders Bjørgum	China; Wang Fengchun; Liu Rui; Xu Xiaoming; Zang Jialiang; Chen Lu'an	9–5	South Korea; Kim Chang-min; Kim Min-chan; Lim Myung-sup; Seong Se-hyeon; Seo Young-seon
2011 details	(Turkey) Erzurum	South Korea; Kim Chang-min; Kim Min-chan; Seong Se-hyeon; Seo Young-seon; Oh Eun-su	10–6	Switzerland; Pascal Hess; Stefan Meienberg; Jean-Francois Mayoraz; Bastian Brun; Florian Meister	Czech Republic; Lukáš Klíma; Jiří Candra; Tomáš Paul; David Jirounek; Kryštof Chaloupek	3–2	Great Britain; Glen Muirhead; Alasdair Guthrie; Greg Drummond; Kerr Drummond; Michael Goodfellow
2013 details	(Italy) Baselga di Piné	Sweden; Oskar Eriksson; Kristian Lindström; Markus Eriksson; Christoffer Sundgren	9–5	Great Britain; Kyle Smith; Thomas Muirhead; Kyle Waddell; Cammy Smith; Derrick Sloan	Canada; Brendan Bottcher; Mick Lizmore; Brad Thiessen; Karrick Martin; Parker Konschuh	6–5	Norway; Markus Høiberg; Steffen Walstad; Magnus Nedregotten; Sander Rølvåg; Wilhelm Næss
2015 details	(Spain) Granada	Norway; Steffen Walstad; Eirik Mjøen; Magnus Nedregotten; Sander Rølvåg	7–6	Russia; Evgeniy Arkhipov; Alexey Stukalskiy; Artur Razhabov; Anton Kalalb; Andrey Drozdov	Great Britain; Kyle Smith; Grant Hardie; Thomas Muirhead; Alasdair Schreiber; Stuart Taylor	7–4	Sweden; Gustav Eskilsson; Patric Mabergs; Jesper Johanson; Johannes Patz
2017 details	(Kazakhstan) Almaty	Great Britain; Bruce Mouat; Bobby Lammie; Gregor Cannon; Derrick Sloan; Alasdair Schreiber	8–6	Sweden; Gustav Eskilsson; Patric Mabergs; Fredrik Nyman; Johannes Patz	Norway; Steffen Walstad; Markus Høiberg; Magnus Nedregotten; Sander Rølvåg	7–3	Czech Republic; Lukáš Klíma; Marek Černovský; Martin Jurík; Samuel Mokriš; Jakub Splavec
2019 details	(Russia) Krasnoyarsk	Norway; Magnus Ramsfjell; Martin Sesaker; Bendik Ramsfjell; Gaute Nepstad	6–5	Canada; Karsten Sturmay; Tristan Steinke; Chris Kennedy; Glenn Venance	Great Britain; Ross Whyte; Duncan McFadzean; Ryan McCormack; Robin McCall; Luke Carson	10–5	Switzerland; Yannick Schwaller; Michael Brunner; Romano Meier; Marcel Käufeler; Simon Gloor
2023 details	(United States) Saranac Lake	Great Britain; James Craik; Mark Watt; Angus Bryce; Blair Haswell; Jack Carrick	5–1	United States; Daniel Casper; Luc Violette; Ben Richardson; Chase Sinnett; Marius Kleinas	Canada; Owen Purcell; Jeffrey Meagher; Adam McEachren; David McCurdy; Caelan McPherson	3–2	Switzerland; Jan Iseli; Maximilian Winz; Andreas Gerlach; Matthieu Fague; Nathan Weber
2025 details	(Italy) Turin	Norway; Lukas Høstmælingen; Grunde Morten Burås; Magnus Lunde Lillebø; Tinius Haslev Nordbye	8–4	United States; Caden Hebert; Jackson Bestland; Jackson Armstrong; Jack Wendtland; Connor Kauffman	Switzerland; Jan Iseli; Maximilian Winz; Dean Hürlimann; Sandro Fanchini	6–1	Canada; Josh Bryden; Adam Bukurak; Carter Williamson; Ryan Grabarczyk; Ayden Wittmire
2027 details	(China) Changchun

=== Women's ===
Year	Location	Gold medal game			Bronze medal game
Year	Location	Gold medalist	Score	Silver medalist	Bronze medalist	Score	Fourth place
2003 details	(Italy) Tarvisio	Russia; Olga Jarkova; Nkeirouka Ezekh; Yana Nekrasova; Anastasia Skultan; Anna Rubtsova	11–2	Canada; Krista Scharf; Amy Stachiw; Laura Armitage; Margaret Carr	Norway; Linn Githmark; Marianne Rørvik; Charlotte Hovring; Henriette Wang	5–3	Switzerland; Nadja Heuer; Sybil Bachofen; Andrea Ulrich; Vera Heuer; Miriam Wymann
2007 details	(Italy) Pinerolo	Canada; Brittany Gregor; Hayley Pattison; Katrine Fisette; Heather Hansen	6–5	Russia; Liudmila Privivkova; Nkeirouka Ezekh; Margarita Fomina; Ekaterina Galkina; Julia Svetova	Japan; Moe Meguro; Mari Motohashi; Mayo Yamaura; Sakurako Terada; Asuka Yogo	7–6	Sweden; Stina Viktorsson; Maria Wennerström; Hedvig Kamp; Sigrid Kamp
2009 details	(China) Harbin	China; Wang Bingyu; Liu Yin; Yue Qingshuang; Zhou Yan; Liu Jinli	6–5	Canada; Hollie Nicol; Danielle Inglis; Laura Hickey; Hilary McDermott; Erica Butler	Russia; Liudmila Privivkova; Nkeirouka Ezekh; Margarita Fomina; Ekaterina Galkina; Ekaterina Antonova	8–4	Great Britain; Sarah Reid; Kay Adams; Vicki Adams; Sarah MacIntyre; Laura Kirkpatrick
2011 details	(Turkey) Erzurum	Great Britain; Anna Sloan; Lauren Gray; Vicki Adams; Sarah MacIntyre; Claire Hamilton	7–6	Russia; Anna Sidorova; Margarita Fomina; Ekaterina Antonova; Ekaterina Galkina; Liudmila Privivkova	South Korea; Kim Ji-sun; Lee Seul-bee; Gim Un-chi; Lee Hye-soo	8–5	Japan; Sayaka Yoshimura; Rina Ida; Risa Ujihara; Mao Ishigaki; Midori Hachimaru
2013 details	(Italy) Baselga di Piné	Russia; Anna Sidorova; Margarita Fomina; Alexandra Saitova; Ekaterina Galkina; Victoria Moiseeva	8–4	South Korea; Kim Ji-sun; Gim Un-chi; Um Min-ji; Lee Seul-bee	Switzerland; Michèle Jäggi; Marisa Winkelhausen; Melanie Barbezat; Nora Baumann; Corina Mani	8–6	Great Britain; Hannah Fleming; Lauren Gray; Jennifer Dodds; Alice Spence; Abi Brown
2015 details	(Spain) Granada	Russia; Anna Sidorova; Margarita Fomina; Alexandra Saitova; Ekaterina Galkina; Victoria Moiseeva	9–8	Canada; Breanne Meakin; Lauren Horton; Lynn Kreviazuk; Jessica Armstrong	Switzerland; Michèle Jäggi; Michelle Gribi; Sina Wettstein; Nora Baumann; Anita Jäggi	8-7	Sweden; Sara McManus; Cecilia Östlund; Anna Huhta; Sofia Mabergs
2017 details	(Kazakhstan) Almaty	Canada; Kelsey Rocque; Danielle Schmiemann; Taylor McDonald; Taylore Theroux	8–3	Russia; Victoria Moiseeva; Uliana Vasilyeva; Galina Arsenkina; Yulia Portunova; Maria Duyunova	Sweden; Isabella Wranå; Jennie Wåhlin; Almida de Val; Fanny Sjöberg	6–3	Switzerland; Elena Stern; Briar Hürlimann; Anna Stern; Céline Koller; Noelle Iseli
2019 details	(Russia) Krasnoyarsk	Sweden; Isabella Wranå; Jennie Wåhlin; Almida de Val; Fanny Sjöberg	8–3	South Korea; Kim Min-ji; Kim Hye-rin; Yang Tae-i; Kim Su-jin	Russia; Uliana Vasilyeva; Maria Komarova; Anastasia Danshina; Ekaterina Kuzmina; Anna Venevtseva	12–5	Great Britain; Sophie Jackson; Naomi Brown; Mili Smith; Sophie Sinclair; Leanne McKenzie
2023 details	(United States) Saranac Lake	China; Han Yu; Dong Ziqi; Zhu Zihui; Jiang Jiayi; Ren Haining	6–4	South Korea; Ha Seung-youn; Kim Hye-rin; Yang Tae-i; Kim Su-jin	United States; Delaney Strouse; Anne O'Hara; Sydney Mullaney; Rebecca Rodgers; Susan Dudt	7–3	Great Britain; Fay Henderson; Robyn Munro; Holly Wilkie-Milne; Laura Watt; Lisa Davie
2025 details	(Italy) Turin	Japan; Yuina Miura; Kohane Tsuruga; Eri Ogihara; Rin Suzuki; Ai Matsunaga	7–5	South Korea; Kang Bo-bae; Kim Min-seo; Shim Yu-jeong; Kim Ji-soo; Jeong Jae-hee	Canada; Serena Gray-Withers; Catherine Clifford; Brianna Cullen; Zoe Cinnamon; Gracelyn Richard	7–3	Norway; Torild Bjørnstad; Nora Østgård; Ingeborg Forbregd; Eirin Mesloe
2027 details	(China) Changchun

=== Mixed doubles ===
Year	Location	Gold medal game			Bronze medal game
Year	Location	Gold medalist	Score	Silver medalist	Bronze medalist	Score	Fourth place
2025 details	(Italy) Turin	Great Britain; Robyn Munro; Orrin Carson	10–8	Germany; Kim Sutor; Klaudius Harsch	Canada; Jessica Zheng; Victor Pietrangelo	9–2	Italy; Giulia Zardini Lacedelli; Francesco De Zanna
2027 details	(China) Changchun

== Performance timeline ==
=== Men's ===
Country	2000s			2010s					2020s			Years
Country	03	07	09	11	13	15	17	19	23	25	27	Years
Brazil									10			1
Canada	1st place, gold medalist(s)	4	6	5	3rd place, bronze medalist(s)	5	6	2nd place, silver medalist(s)	3rd place, bronze medalist(s)	4	Q	11
China		6	3rd place, bronze medalist(s)		9			10		10	Q	6
Czech Republic	8	9		3rd place, bronze medalist(s)	7	6	4	6	9			8
Finland			9									1
Great Britain	4	2nd place, silver medalist(s)	7	4	2nd place, silver medalist(s)	3rd place, bronze medalist(s)	1st place, gold medalist(s)	3rd place, bronze medalist(s)	1st place, gold medalist(s)	9		10
Hong Kong											Q	1
Italy	9	10			10					6		4
Japan	5	7	10			7	9		8		Q	7
Kazakhstan							10					1
Norway	7		2nd place, silver medalist(s)	6	4	1st place, gold medalist(s)	3rd place, bronze medalist(s)	1st place, gold medalist(s)	7	1st place, gold medalist(s)	Q	10
Russia	10					2nd place, silver medalist(s)	8	9			Q	5
South Korea	3rd place, bronze medalist(s)	5	4	1st place, gold medalist(s)	8		5	7	6	5	Q	10
Slovenia				10								1
Spain						10					Q	2
Sweden		3rd place, bronze medalist(s)	1st place, gold medalist(s)	8	1st place, gold medalist(s)	4	2nd place, silver medalist(s)	5	5	7		9
Switzerland	2nd place, silver medalist(s)	8	5	2nd place, silver medalist(s)	6	9		4	4	3rd place, bronze medalist(s)	Q	10
Turkey				9								1
Ukraine										8		1
United States	6	1st place, gold medalist(s)	8	7	5	8	6	8	2nd place, silver medalist(s)	2nd place, silver medalist(s)	Q	11

=== Women's ===
Country	2000s			2010s					2020s			Years
Country	03	07	09	11	13	15	17	19	23	25	27	Years
Australia									10			1
Canada	2nd place, silver medalist(s)	1st place, gold medalist(s)	2nd place, silver medalist(s)	6	6	2nd place, silver medalist(s)	1st place, gold medalist(s)	6	7	3rd place, bronze medalist(s)	Q	11
China		6	1st place, gold medalist(s)	5	9		7	5	1st place, gold medalist(s)	5	Q	9
Czech Republic			5	7				9			Q	4
Germany	6			8			8					3
Great Britain		10	4	1st place, gold medalist(s)	4	7	5	4	4	7		9
Italy		5			10			10		8		4
Japan	8	3rd place, bronze medalist(s)	8	4	7	9		7	8	1st place, gold medalist(s)	Q	10
Kazakhstan							10					1
Norway	3rd place, bronze medalist(s)					6	9			4	Q	4
Poland			10	9						10		3
Russia	1st place, gold medalist(s)	2nd place, silver medalist(s)	3rd place, bronze medalist(s)	2nd place, silver medalist(s)	1st place, gold medalist(s)	1st place, gold medalist(s)	2nd place, silver medalist(s)	3rd place, bronze medalist(s)			Q	9
South Korea	5	9	7	3rd place, bronze medalist(s)	2nd place, silver medalist(s)	5	6	2nd place, silver medalist(s)	2nd place, silver medalist(s)	2nd place, silver medalist(s)	Q	11
Spain						10			9		Q	3
Sweden		4	6		5	4	3rd place, bronze medalist(s)	1st place, gold medalist(s)	5	6		8
Switzerland	4	8			3rd place, bronze medalist(s)	3rd place, bronze medalist(s)	4	8	6		Q	8
Turkey				10								1
United States	7	7	9		8	8			3rd place, bronze medalist(s)	9	Q	8

=== Mixed doubles ===
Country	2020s		Years
Country	25	27	Years
Australia		Q	1
Canada	3rd place, bronze medalist(s)	Q	2
China		Q	1
Germany	2nd place, silver medalist(s)	Q	2
Great Britain	1st place, gold medalist(s)		1
Italy	4	Q	2
Japan	5	Q	2
Norway	8		1
South Korea		Q	1
Sweden		Q	1
Switzerland	6	Q	2
United States	7	Q	2

== Medal table ==
As of 2025 Winter World University Games

Rank	Nation	Gold	Silver	Bronze	Total
1	Great Britain (GBR)	4	2	2	8
2	Canada (CAN)	3	4	4	11
3	Russia (RUS)	3	4	2	9
4	Norway (NOR)	3	1	2	6
4	Sweden (SWE)	3	1	2	6
6	China (CHN)	2	0	1	3
7	South Korea (KOR)	1	4	2	7
8	United States (USA)	1	2	1	4
9	Japan (JPN)	1	0	1	2
10	Switzerland (SUI)	0	2	3	5
11	Germany (GER)	0	1	0	1
12	Czech Republic (CZE)	0	0	1	1
Totals (12 entries)		21	21	21	63
