= Nina Golovtchenko =

Russian curler

- Curler ♀

Team
- Curling club: Dinamo, Moscow, Moskvitch CC, Moscow

Curling career
- Member Association: Russia
- World Championship: 1 (2001)
- European Championship: 2 (1999, 2000)
- Other appearances: World Junior Championships: 3 (1999, 2000, 2001)
Medal record
Russian Women's Championship
Gold medal – first place	1999	St. Petersburg
Gold medal – first place	2001	St. Petersburg
Silver medal – second place	2000	St. Petersburg

Nina Golovtchenko (Russian: Ни́на Голо́вченко) is a Russian curler and two-time Russian women's champion (1999, 2001).

She was the skip of the Russian national women's team in the team's first appearance at the 2001 World Women's Curling Championship.

== Teams ==
=== Women's ===
Season	Skip	Third	Second	Lead	Alternate	Coach	Events
1998–99	Nina Golovtchenko	Olga Jarkova	Anastasia Skultan	Anna Rubtsova	Elmira Gouliaeva	Olga Andrianova	WJCC 1999 (10th)
1998–99	Nina Golovtchenko	?	?	?			RWCC 1999 (gold)
1999–00	Olga Jarkova (fourth)	Nina Golovtchenko (skip)	Yana Nekrasova	Irina Kolesnikova	Tatiana Smirnova	Olga Andrianova	ECC 1999 (8th)
1999–00	Nina Golovtchenko	Olga Jarkova	Anastasia Skultan	Nkeirouka Ezekh	Anna Rubtsova	Olga Andrianova, Yory Andrianov	WJCC 2000 (7th)
1999–00	Nina Golovtchenko	?	?	?			RWCC 2000 (silver)
2000–01	Olga Jarkova (fourth)	Nina Golovtchenko (skip)	Anastasia Skultan	Nkeirouka Ezekh	Yana Nekrasova	Olga Andrianova	ECC 2000 (7th)
2000–01	Nina Golovtchenko	Nkeirouka Ezekh	Anastasia Skultan	Angela Tuvaeva	Liudmila Privivkova	Olga Andrianova	WJCC 2001 (6th)
2000–01	Nina Golovtchenko	?	?	?			RWCC 2001 (gold)
2000–01	Olga Jarkova (fourth)	Nina Golovtchenko (skip)	Nkeiruka Ezekh	Yana Nekrasova	Anastasia Skultan	Olga Andrianova	WCC 2001 (9th)
