= Ekaterina Galkina =

Russian curler

Ekaterina Galkina Екатерина Галкина
- Curler ♀
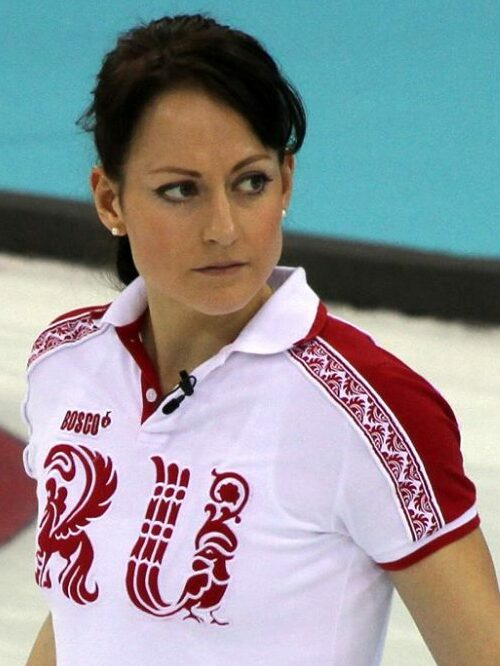
- Born: 10 August 1988 (age 38); Moscow, Russia

Team
- Curling club: Moskvitch CC, Moscow, RUS
- Skip: Anna Sidorova
- Third: Margarita Fomina
- Second: Alexandra Saitova
- Lead: Ekaterina Galkina
- Alternate: Nkeirouka Ezekh

Curling career
- Member Association: Russia
- World Championship: 10 (2005, 2007, 2008, 2009, 2010, 2011, 2012, 2013, 2014, 2015)
- European Championship: 10 (2004, 2005, 2006, 2007, 2008, 2009, 2010, 2011, 2012, 2013)
- Olympic: 3 (2006, 2010, 2014)
- Other appearances: Winter Universiade: 5 (2007, 2009, 2011, 2013, 2015), World Junior Championships: 8 (2003, 2004, 2005, 2006, 2007, 2008, 2009, 2010)
Medal record
Curling
World Championships
Bronze medal – third place	2014 Saint John
Bronze medal – third place	2015 Sapporo
Winter Universiade
Gold medal – first place	2013 Trentino
Gold medal – first place	2015 Granada
Silver medal – second place	2007 Torino
Silver medal – second place	2011 Erzurum
Bronze medal – third place	2009 Harbin
World Junior Championships
Gold medal – first place	2006 Jeonju
European Championships
Gold medal – first place	2006 Basel
Gold medal – first place	2012 Karlstadt
Silver medal – second place	2014 Champéry
Bronze medal – third place	2011 Moscow
European Junior Challenge
Gold medal – first place	2005 Copenhagen
Russian Women's Curling Championships
Gold medal – first place	2006 Moscow
Gold medal – first place	2011 Tver/Dmitrov
Gold medal – first place	2013 Dmitrov
Gold medal – first place	2015 Sochi
Gold medal – first place	2016 Sochi
Silver medal – second place	2007 Moscow
Silver medal – second place	2008 Moscow
Silver medal – second place	2009 Moscow
Silver medal – second place	2010 Dmitrov
Silver medal – second place	2012 Dmitrov
Bronze medal – third place	2014 Sochi

Ekaterina Vladimirovna Galkina (Russian: Екатери́на Влади́мировна Га́лкина; born 10 August 1988 in Moscow) is a Russian curler.

At the 2006 Winter Olympics, in Turin, Italy, she was part of Ludmila Privivkova's team. A year later this team won the 2006 European Curling Championships.

She has studied Management and International Relations at the Russian State University for the Humanities.

In January 2010 Galkina was officially named to the Russian Olympic Team. She and her teammates represented Russia at the 2014 Ford World Women's Curling Championship held in Saint John, New Brunswick, Canada, from 15 to 23 March. The team had an 8-3 record in the round robin and was seeded third in the playoffs. Team Russia lost the 3-4 Page playoff game to Team Korea, but later defeated Team Korea to win the bronze medal. It was the first medal for Russia in the world women's curling championships. The team also competed for Russia at the 2014 Winter Olympics held in Sochi, Russia, and finished in ninth place.

Galkina is a five-time Russian women's champion curler. She played on many international events as a member of national or club teams.

Currently she works as an Executive Board member for Russian Curling Federation and time to time served as a curling color commentator for Match TV (Russian federal sports television channel) and Russian Curling TV YouTube channel.

== Teams ==
=== Women's ===
Season	Skip	Third	Second	Lead	Alternate	Coach	Events
2002–03	Liudmila Privivkova	Ekaterina Galkina	Margarita Fomina	Ilona Grichina	Olga Volochova	Olga Andrianova, Anna Andrianova	WJCC 2003 (9th)
2003–04	Liudmila Privivkova	Nkeiruka Ezekh	Margarita Fomina	Olga Arbuzova	Ekaterina Galkina	Olga Andrianova	WJCC 2004 (10th)
2004–05	Olga Jarkova	Nkeiruka Ezekh	Yana Nekrasova	Ekaterina Galkina	Liudmila Privivkova	Olga Andrianova	ECC 2004 (4th)
2004–05	Liudmila Privivkova	Ekaterina Galkina	Margarita Fomina	Angela Tuvaeva	Nkeiruka Ezekh	Olga Andrianova, Yory Andrianov	EJCC 2005 (gold)
2004–05	Liudmila Privivkova	Nkeiruka Ezekh	Ekaterina Galkina	Margarita Fomina	Angela Tuvaeva	Olga Andrianova	WJCC 2005 (5th)
2004–05	Liudmila Privivkova	Nkeiruka Ezekh	Yana Nekrasova	Ekaterina Galkina	Olga Jarkova	Olga Andrianova	WCC 2005 (5th)
2005–06	Ludmila Privivkova	Nkeiruka Ezekh	Olga Jarkova	Ekaterina Galkina	Margarita Fomina	Olga Andrianova, Yory Andrianov	ECC 2005 (8th)
2005–06	Liudmila Privivkova	Ekaterina Galkina	Margarita Fomina	Angela Tuvaeva	Daria Kozlova	Olga Andrianova	WJCC 2006 (gold)
2005–06	Ludmila Privivkova	Nkeiruka Ezekh	Olga Jarkova	Ekaterina Galkina	Yana Nekrasova	Olga Andrianova, Yory Andrianov	WOG 2006 (5th)
2006–07	Liudmila Privivkova	Nkeiruka Ezekh	Margarita Fomina	Ekaterina Galkina	Julia Svetova	Olga Andrianova	WUG 2007 (silver)
2006–07	Liudmila Privivkova	Ekaterina Galkina	Margarita Fomina	Angela Tuvaeva	Daria Kozlova	Olga Andrianova	WJCC 2007 (7th)
2006–07	Liudmila Privivkova	Olga Jarkova	Nkeiruka Ezekh	Ekaterina Galkina	Margarita Fomina	Olga Andrianova	ECC 2006 (gold); WCC 2007 (10th)
2007–08	Liudmila Privivkova	Margarita Fomina	Ekaterina Galkina	Julia Svetova	Daria Kozlova	Olga Andrianova	WJCC 2008 (4th)
2007–08	Liudmila Privivkova	Olga Jarkova	Nkeiruka Ezekh	Ekaterina Galkina	Margarita Fomina	Olga Andrianova	ECC 2007 (5th); WCC 2008 (8th)
2008–09	Liudmila Privivkova	Nkeiruka Ezekh	Margarita Fomina	Ekaterina Galkina	Ekaterina Antonova	Olga Andrianova	WUG 2009 (bronze)
2008–09	Margarita Fomina	Ekaterina Galkina	Anna Sidorova	Daria Kozlova	Galina Arsenkina	Olga Andrianova	WJCC 2009 (4th)
2008–09	Liudmila Privivkova	Olga Jarkova	Nkeiruka Ezekh	Ekaterina Galkina	Margarita Fomina	Olga Andrianova	ECC 2008 (7th); WCC 2009 (7th)
2008–09	Liudmila Privivkova	Ekaterina Galkina	Margarita Fomina	Ekaterina Antonova			RWCCup 2008 (gold); RWCCh 2009 (silver)
2009–10	Liudmila Privivkova	Olga Jarkova	Nkeiruka Ezekh	Ekaterina Galkina	Anna Sidorova	Olga Andrianova	ECC 2009 (4th)
2009–10	Anna Sidorova	Margarita Fomina	Ekaterina Galkina	Galina Arsenkina	Ekaterina Antonova	Olga Andrianova	WJCC 2010 (5th)
2009–10	Liudmila Privivkova	Anna Sidorova	Nkeiruka Ezekh	Ekaterina Galkina	Margarita Fomina	Olga Andrianova	WOG 2010 (9th); WCC 2010 (8th)
2009–10	Margarita Fomina	Ekaterina Galkina	Ekaterina Antonova	Nadezhda Lepezina	Liudmila Privivkova		RWCCup 2009 (5th); RWCCh 2010 (silver)
2010–11	Anna Sidorova	Margarita Fomina	Ekaterina Antonova	Ekaterina Galkina	Liudmila Privivkova	Olga Andrianova	WUG 2011 (silver)
2010–11	Liudmila Privivkova	Anna Sidorova	Nkeiruka Ezekh	Ekaterina Galkina	Margarita Fomina	Olga Andrianova	ECC 2010 (4th)
2010–11	Liudmila Privivkova	Anna Sidorova	Margarita Fomina	Ekaterina Galkina	Nkeiruka Ezekh	Olga Andrianova	WCC 2011 (6th)
2010–11	Liudmila Privivkova	Margarita Fomina	Ekaterina Antonova	Ekaterina Galkina	Anastasia Prokofieva (RWCCh)		RWCCup 2010 (gold); RWCCh 2011 (gold)
2011–12	Anna Sidorova	Liudmila Privivkova	Margarita Fomina	Ekaterina Galkina	Nkeiruka Ezekh	Olga Andrianova	ECC 2011 (bronze); WCC 2012 (9th)
2011–12	Liudmila Privivkova	Margarita Fomina	Ekaterina Galkina	Ekaterina Antonova			RWCCup 2011 (silver); RWCCh 2012 (silver)
2012–13	Anna Sidorova	Liudmila Privivkova	Margarita Fomina	Ekaterina Galkina	Nkeiruka Ezekh	Thomas Lips, Svetlana Kalalb (ECC)	ECC 2012 (gold); WCC 2013 (6th)
2012–13	Liudmila Privivkova	Margarita Fomina	Ekaterina Galkina	Ekaterina Antonova	Anastasia Beginina		RWCCh 2013 (gold)
2013–14	Anna Sidorova	Margarita Fomina	Aleksandra Saitova	Ekaterina Galkina	Viktoria Moiseeva	Thomas Lips	WUG 2013 (gold)
2013–14	Anna Sidorova	Margarita Fomina	Aleksandra Saitova	Ekaterina Galkina	Nkeiruka Ezekh	Thomas Lips	ECC 2013 (5th); WOG 2014 (9th); WCC 2014 (bronze)
2013–14	Liudmila Privivkova	Ekaterina Galkina	Margarita Fomina	Ekaterina Antonova	Valeria Shelkova		RWCCh 2014 (bronze)
2014–15	Anna Sidorova	Margarita Fomina	Aleksandra Saitova	Ekaterina Galkina	Viktoria Moiseeva (WUG); Nkeiruka Ezekh (ECC, WCC)	Svetlana Kalalb, Rodger Gustaf Schmidt (WCC)	ECC 2014 (silver); WUG 2015 (gold); WCC 2015 (bronze)
2018–19	Ekaterina Galkina	Ekaterina Antonova	Anna Antonyuk	Anastasia Skultan	Rimma Shayafetdinova		RWCCup 2018 (silver); RWCCh 2019 (7th)

=== Mixed ===
Season	Skip	Third	Second	Lead	Alternate	Events
2007–08	Artyom Bolduzev	Ekaterina Galkina	Alexey Stukalskiy	Ekaterina Antonova	Vadim Raev, Olga Zyablikova	RMxCC 2008 (silver)
2008–09	Alexander Kirikov	Margarita Fomina	Roman Kutuzov	Ekaterina Galkina		RMxCC 2009 (gold)
2009–10	Roman Kutuzov	Ekaterina Galkina	Aleksandr Kozyrev	Ekaterina Antonova		RMxCC 2010 (10th)
2010–11	Roman Kutuzov	Ekaterina Galkina	Vadim Raev	Alina Biktimirova		RMxCC 2011 (???th)
2011–12	Roman Kutuzov	Nkeirouka Ezekh	Vadim Raev	Ekaterina Galkina	Sergey Manulychev, Tatiana Makeeva	RMxCC 2012 (gold)
