= Dmitry Abanin =

Russian curler

Dmitry Abanin Дми́трий Аба́нин
- Curler
- Born: 31 December 1980 (age 45); Moscow, USSR

Team
- Skip: Alex Pokras
- Third: Dmitry Abanin
- Second: Lawrence Sidney
- Lead: Jeffrey Yaakov Lutz

Curling career
- Member Association: Russia (2001-2021); Israel (2024-Present)
- World Mixed Doubles Championship: 1 (2008)
- European Championship: 3 (2001, 2005, 2006)
- Other appearances: European Curling Championship C-Division: 1 (2024), European Mixed Championship: 2 (2005, 2006), Word Junior Championships: 1 (2002)
Medal record
Russian Men's Championship
Gold medal – first place	2005 Moscow
Gold medal – first place	2006 Moscow
Gold medal – first place	2008 Moscow
Bronze medal – third place	2014 Sochi
Bronze medal – third place	2019 Sochi
European Mixed Championship
Bronze medal – third place	2006 Claut
Russian Mixed Championship
Bronze medal – third place	2008 Moscow
Russian Mixed Doubles Championship
Gold medal – first place	2007 Moscow
European Championship C-Division
Silver medal – second place	2024 Dumfries

Dmitry Sergeyevich Abanin (Russian: Дми́трий Серге́евич Аба́нин; born 31 December 1980 in Moscow, USSR) is an Israeli curler, previously competing for Russia from 2001 to 2021.

At the international level he is a 2006 European Mixed Curling Championship bronze medallist.

At the national level he is a three-time Russian men's champion curler (2005, 2006, 2008) and a 2007 Russian mixed doubles champion curler.

== Awards ==
- Russian Men's Curling Championship: gold (2005, 2006, 2008), bronze (2014, 2019).
- European Mixed Curling Championship: bronze (2006).
- Master of Sports of Russia, International Class (curling, 2006).

== Teams ==
=== Men's ===
Season	Skip	Third	Second	Lead	Alternate	Coach	Events
2001–02	Alexander Kirikov	Vadim Shkolnikov	Vadim Stebakov	Dmitry Abanin	Mikhail Fokin	Yory Andrianov	ECC 2001 (13th)
2001–02	Alexander Kirikov	Vadim Stebakov	Konstantin Doroshenko	Dmitry Abanin	Ilya Rotchev	Yory Andrianov	WJCC 2002 (5th)
2004–05	Alexander Kirikov	Vladimir Shkolnikov	Alexey Kamnev	Dmitry Abanin	Anton Kalalb, Andrey Drozdov		RMCCh 2005 (gold)
2005–06	Alexander Kirikov	Dmitri Ryjov	Dmitry Abanin	Alexey Kamnev	Roman Kutuzov		ECC 2005 (9th)
2005–06	Alexander Kirikov	Dmitri Ryjov	Vadim Stebakov	Dmitry Abanin	Petr Dron		
2005–06	Alexander Kirikov	Vladimir Shkolnikov	Alexey Kamnev	Dmitry Abanin			RMCCh 2006 (gold)
2006–07	Alexander Kirikov	Petr Dron	Vadim Shkolnikov	Dmitry Abanin	Alexey Kamnev		ECC 2006 (13th)
2006–07	Alexander Kirikov	Andrey Drozdov	Roman Kutuzov	Dmitry Abanin	Alexey Kamnev		
2007–08	Alexander Kirikov	Andrey Drozdov	Roman Kutuzov	Dmitry Abanin	Alexey Kamnev		
2007–08	Alexander Kirikov	Vladimir Shkolnikov	Alexey Kamnev	Dmitry Abanin			RMCCh 2008 (gold)
2013–14	Alexander Kirikov	Alexandr Kuzmin	Alexander Chelyshev	Dmitry Abanin	Vadim Shkolnikov	Vladimir Romanov	RMCCh 2014 (bronze)
2016–17	Alexander Kirikov	Vadim Shkolnikov	Dmitry Abanin	Sergei Morozov			RMCCh 2017 (4th)
2017–18	Alexander Kirikov	Vadim Shkolnikov	Dmitry Abanin	Sergei Morozov			RMCCh 2018 (5th)
2018–19	Alexander Kirikov	Andrey Drozdov	Vadim Shkolnikov	Sergei Morozov	Dmitry Abanin		RMCCh 2019 (bronze)
2019–20	Alexander Kirikov	Andrey Drozdov	Vadim Shkolnikov	Sergei Morozov	Dmitry Abanin		RMCCup 2019 (7th)
2020–21	Alexander Kirikov	Andrey Drozdov	Vadim Shkolnikov	Sergei Morozov	Dmitry Abanin		RMCCup 2020 (9th)
2024–25	Alex Pokras	Dmitry Abanin	Lawrence Sidney	Jeffrey Yaakov Lutz			C-Division ECC 2024 (silver)

=== Mixed ===
Season	Skip	Third	Second	Lead	Alternate	Events
2005–06	Alexander Kirikov	Margarita Fomina	Dmitry Abanin	Angela Tuvaeva	Alexey Kamnev, Ilona Grishina	EMxCC 2005 (6th)
2006–07	Alexander Kirikov	Daria Kozlova	Dmitry Abanin	Julia Svetova	Andrey Drozdov, Angela Tuvaeva	EMxCC 2006 (bronze)
2007–08	Margarita Fomina	Aleksandr Kozyrev	Maria Gorbokonj	Dmitry Abanin	Anna Lobova	RMxCCh 2008 (bronze)
2013–14	Alexander Kirikov	Viktoria Makarshina	Vadim Shkolnikov	Galina Arsenkina	Dmitry Abanin	RMxCCh 2014 (4th)
2014–15	Alexander Kirikov	Viktoria Makarshina	Dmitry Abanin	Anna Lobova	Vadim Shkolnikov, Valeria Sklyarenko	RMxCCup 2014 (bronze)

=== Mixed doubles ===
Season	Male	Female	Alternate	Coach	Events
2006–07	Dmitry Abanin	Olga Zharkova	Anna Sidorova		RMDCCh 2007 (gold)
2007–08	Dmitry Abanin	Ilona Grishina		Konstantin Zadvornov	WMDCC 2008 (20th)
2008–09	Dmitry Abanin	Olga Zharkova			RMDCCup 2008 (gold)
