= Alexander Kirikov =

Russian curler

Alexander Kirikov Алекса́ндр Ки́риков
- Curler
- Born: 21 October 1980 (age 46); Moscow, USSR

Team
- Curling club: Moskvitch CC, Moscow
- Skip: Alexander Kirikov
- Third: Andrey Drozdov
- Second: Vadim Shkolnikov
- Lead: Sergei Morozov
- Alternate: Dmitry Abanin

Curling career
- Member Association: Russia
- World Mixed Doubles Championship: 1 (2009)
- European Championship: 9 (2001, 2002, 2003, 2004, 2005, 2006, 2007, 2009, 2010)
- Other appearances: European Mixed Championship: 5 (2005, 2006, 2007, 2008, 2011), Word Junior Championships: 2 (2001, 2002)
Medal record
Russian Men's Championship
Gold medal – first place	2005 Moscow
Gold medal – first place	2006 Moscow
Gold medal – first place	2008 Moscow
Gold medal – first place	2010 Moscow
Bronze medal – third place	2013 Dmitrov
Bronze medal – third place	2014 Sochi
Bronze medal – third place	2019 Sochi
European Mixed Championship
Bronze medal – third place	2006 Claut
Russian Mixed Championship
Gold medal – first place	2007 Moscow
Gold medal – first place	2008 Moscow
Gold medal – first place	2009 Dmitrov
Gold medal – first place	2010 Dmitrov

Alexander Alexandrovich Kirikov (Russian: Алекса́ндр Алекса́ндрович Ки́риков; born 21 October 1980 in Moscow, USSR) is a Russian curler.

At the international level he is a 2006 European Mixed Curling Championship bronze medallist.

At the national level he is a four-time Russian men's champion curler (2005, 2006, 2008, 2010) and a four-time Russian mixed champion curler (2007, 2008, 2009, 2010).

He is Master of Sports of Russia, International Class (curling).

== Teams ==
=== Men's ===
Season	Skip	Third	Second	Lead	Alternate	Coach	Events
2000–01	Alexander Kirikov	Pavel Makoukha	Vadim Stebakov	Mikhail Fokin	Alexei Rascheupkin	Yory Andrianov	WJCC 2001 (9th)
2001–02	Alexander Kirikov	Vadim Shkolnikov	Vadim Stebakov	Dmitry Abanin	Mikhail Fokin	Yory Andrianov	ECC 2001 (13th)
2001–02	Alexander Kirikov	Vadim Stebakov	Konstantin Doroshenko	Dmitry Abanin	Ilya Rotchev	Yory Andrianov	WJCC 2002 (5th)
2002–03	Alexey Tselousov	Dmitri Ryjov	Alexander Kirikov	Victor Vorobiev	Pavel Makoukha	Aleksander Kolesnikov	ECC 2002 (13th)
2003–04	Alexander Kirikov	Dmitri Ryjov	Vadim Stebakov	Victor Vorobiev		Aleksander Kolesnikov	ECC 2003 (11th)
2004–05	Alexander Kirikov	Dmitri Ryjov	Alexey Tselousov	Victor Vorobiev	Vadim Stebakov	Aleksander Kolesnikov	ECC 2004 (8th)
2005–06	Alexander Kirikov	Dmitri Ryjov	Dmitry Abanin	Alexey Kamnev	Roman Kutuzov		ECC 2005 (9th)
2005–06	Alexander Kirikov	Dmitri Ryjov	Vadim Stebakov	Dmitry Abanin	Petr Dron		
2006–07	Alexander Kirikov	Petr Dron	Vadim Shkolnikov	Dmitry Abanin	Alexey Kamnev		ECC 2006 (13th)
2006–07	Alexander Kirikov	Andrey Drozdov	Roman Kutuzov	Dmitry Abanin	Alexey Kamnev		
2007–08	Alexander Kirikov	Andrey Drozdov	Petr Dron	Alexey Kamnev	Roman Kutuzov		ECC 2007 (14th)
2007–08	Alexander Kirikov	Andrey Drozdov	Roman Kutuzov	Dmitry Abanin	Alexey Kamnev		
2009–10	Andrey Drozdov	Artem Bolduzev	Alexander Kirikov	Alexey Stukalskiy	Valentin Demenkov (ECC)	Yory Andrianov	ECC 2009 (12th)
2010–11	Andrey Drozdov	Alexander Kirikov	Aleksandr Kozyrev	Alexey Stukalskiy	Anton Kalalb		ECC 2010 (9th)
2010–11	Alexander Kirikov	Roman Kutuzov	Aleksandr Kozyrev	Petr Dron			
2010–11	Andrey Drozdov	Artem Bolduzev	Alexander Kirikov	Anton Kalalb			
2011–12	Alexander Kirikov	Vadim Shkolnikov	Artem Bolduzev	Sergei Morozov	Alexandr Kuzmin		RMCCup 2011 (silver)
2011–12	Alexander Kirikov	Artem Shmakov	Anton Kalalb	Artur Razhabov			
2012–13	Artem Bolduzev	Vadim Shkolnikov	Alexander Kirikov	Sergei Morozov	Alexandr Kuzmin		RMCCh 2013 (bronze)
2013–14	Alexander Kirikov	Alexandr Kuzmin	Alexander Chelyshev	Dmitry Abanin	Vadim Shkolnikov	Vladimir Romanov	RMCCh 2014 (bronze)
2014–15	Alexander Kirikov	Vadim Shkolnikov	Alexandr Kuzmin	Alexey Kulikov			
2016–17	Alexander Kirikov	Vadim Shkolnikov	Dmitry Abanin	Sergei Morozov			RMCCh 2017 (4th)
2017–18	Alexander Kirikov	Vadim Shkolnikov	Dmitry Abanin	Sergei Morozov			RMCCh 2018 (5th)
2018–19	Alexander Kirikov	Andrey Drozdov	Vadim Shkolnikov	Sergei Morozov	Dmitry Abanin		RMCCh 2019 (bronze)
2020–21	Alexander Kirikov	Andrey Drozdov	Vadim Shkolnikov	Sergei Morozov	Dmitry Abanin		RMCCup 2020 (9th)

=== Mixed ===
Season	Skip	Third	Second	Lead	Alternate	Coach	Events
2005–06	Alexander Kirikov	Margarita Fomina	Dmitry Abanin	Angela Tuvaeva	Alexey Kamnev, Ilona Grishina		EMxCC 2005 (6th)
2006–07	Alexander Kirikov	Daria Kozlova	Dmitry Abanin	Julia Svetova	Andrey Drozdov, Angela Tuvaeva		EMxCC 2006 (bronze)
2006–07	Alexander Kirikov	?	?	?			RMxCCh 2007 (gold)
2007–08	Alexander Kirikov	Daria Kozlova	Alexey Kamnev	Julia Svetova	Vadim Shkolnikov, Ekaterina Antonova		EMxCC 2007 (5th)
2007–08	Alexander Kirikov	Daria Kozlova	Alexey Kamnev	Julia Svetova	Denis Kilba, Alexandra Saitova		RMxCCh 2008 (gold)
2008–09	Alexander Kirikov	Yana Nekrasova	Petr Dron	Galina Arsenkina	Victor Kornev, Anna Sidorova		EMxCC 2008 (4th)
2008–09	Alexander Kirikov	Margarita Fomina	Roman Kutuzov	Ekaterina Galkina			RMxCCh 2009 (gold)
2009–10	Alexander Kirikov	Olga Jarkova	Vadim Shkolnikov	Olga Zyablikova	Anna Lobova		RMxCCh 2010 (gold)
2011–12	Alexander Kirikov	Viktoria Makarshina	Anton Kalalb	Anna Lobova	Vadim Shkolnikov, Oksana Gertova	Irina Kolesnikova	EMxCC 2011 (13th)
2011–12	Liudmila Privivkova	Vadim Shkolnikov	Ekaterina Antonova	Alexander Kirikov	Rimma Sheyafetdinova		RMxCCh 2012 (4th)
2012–13	Alexander Kirikov	Viktoria Makarshina	Vadim Shkolnikov	Anna Lobova			RMxCCh 2013 (13th)
2013–14	Alexander Kirikov	Viktoria Makarshina	Vadim Shkolnikov	Galina Arsenkina	Dmitry Abanin		RMxCCh 2014 (4th)
2014–15	Alexander Kirikov	Viktoria Makarshina	Dmitry Abanin	Anna Lobova	Vadim Shkolnikov, Valeria Sklyarenko		RMxCCup 2014 (bronze)
2014–15	Alexander Kirikov	Viktoria Makarshina	Vadim Shkolnikov	Elizaveta Lebedeva			RMxCCh 2015 (bronze)

=== Mixed doubles ===
Season	Male	Female	Coach	Events
2008–09	Alexander Kirikov	Olga Jarkova		WMDCC 2009 (9th)
2009–10	Alexander Kirikov	Anna Sidorova	Olga Andrianova, Yuri Andrianov	RMDCCup 2009 (5th)
2011–12	Alexander Kirikov	Valeria Shelkova		RMDCCup 2011 (silver)
2013–14	Alexander Kirikov	Alina Androsova		RMDCCup 2013 (5th)
2013–14	Alexander Kirikov	Nadezhda Lepezina		RMDCCh 2014 (11th)
2015–16	Alexander Kirikov	Viktoria Makarshina		RMDCCh 2016 (6th)
2016–17	Alexander Kirikov	Anastasia Prokofjeva		RMDCCh 2017 (9th)
