= 2019 Russian Women's Curling Championship =

- Host city: Sochi
- Arena: Ice Cube Curling Center
- Dates: April 6–13, 2019
- Winner: Adamant 1 (Saint Petersburg)
- Skip: Alina Kovaleva
- Third: Anastasia Bryzgalova
- Second: Anastasia Danshina
- Lead: Ekaterina Kuzmina
- Alternate: Uliana Vasilyeva
- Finalist: Krasnodar Krai 1 (Sochi; Olga Jarkova)

The 2019 Russian Women's Curling Championship (Russian: Чемпионат России по кёрлингу среди женщин 2019) was held in Sochi from April 6 to 13, 2019.

== Teams ==
Team	Locale	Skip	Third	Second	Lead	Alternate
Team Moscow	Moscow	Margarita Fomina (4th)	Anna Sidorova (skip)	Alexandra Raeva	Nkeirouka Ezekh	Evgeniya Mamykina
Adamant 1	Saint Petersburg	Alina Kovaleva	Anastasia Bryzgalova	Anastasia Danshina	Ekaterina Kuzmina	Uliana Vasilyeva
ShVSM po ZVS	Saint Petersburg	Maria Baksheeva	Maria Duyunova	Victoria Dupont	Arina Zasedateleva	Oksana Gertova
Krasnodar Krai 1	Sochi	Yulia Portunova (4th)	Olga Jarkova (skip)	Galina Arsenkina	Julia Guzieva	Natalya Nalimova
Zekurion-Moskvich	Moscow	Ekaterina Galkina	Ekaterina Antonova	Anna Antonyuk	Anastasia Skultan	Rimma Shayafetdinova
Moscow Oblast 1	Dmitrov	Vlada Rumiantseva	Daria Morozova	Irina Riazanova	Anastasiia Mishchenko	
Moskvitch 1	Moscow	Sophia Orazalina	Yana Nekrasova	Irina Belyayeva	Mariia Arkhipova	Marina Maleeva
Moscow Oblast 2	Dmitrov	Olga Kotelnikova	Kseniya Shevchuk	Daria Panchenko	Daria Styoksova	Alexandra Kardapoltseva
Moskvitch 2	Moscow	Xeniya Novikova	Lolita Tretyak	Natalia Gubanova	Julia Bulgakova	Polina Tchernikh
Komsomoll 1	Irkutsk	Elizaveta Trukhina	Nina Polikarpova	Valeria Denisenko	Alina Fakhurtdinova	

== Round Robin ==
Key
Teams to Playoffs

	Team	Skip	А1	А2	А3	А4	А5	А6	А7	А8	А9	А10	Wins	Losses	DSC	Place
А1	Team Moscow	Anna Sidorova	*	3:8	9:7	6:8	7:5	3:9	9:7	5:8	9:3	8:4	5	4	53,70	5
А2	Adamant 1	Alina Kovaleva	8:3	*	10:4	4:7	7:2	8:3	9:1	11:2	9:4	7:2	8	1	47,61	2
А3	ShVSM po ZVS	Maria Baksheeva	7:9	4:10	*	4:9	6:5	5:7	9:7	5:11	8:3	8:4	4	5	55,68	6
А4	Krasnodar Krai 1	Olga Jarkova	8:6	7:4	9:4	*	7:3	6:5	10:2	7:6	8:3	8:2	9	0	30,60	1
А5	Zekurion-Moskvich	Ekaterina Galkina	5:7	2:7	5:6	3:7	*	6:10	6:4	7:10	11:5	8:3	3	6	72,26	7
А6	Moscow Oblast 1	Vlada Rumiantseva	9:3	3:8	7:5	5:6	10:6	*	7:2	11:10	5:7	7:13	5	4	50,63	3
А7	Moskvitch 1	Sophia Orazalina	7:9	1:9	7:9	2:10	4:6	2:7	*	3:6	5:9	3:7	0	9	60,70	10
А8	Moscow Oblast 2	Olga Kotelnikova	8:5	2:11	11:5	6:7	10:7	10:11	6:3	*	6:7	5:4	5	4	84,69	4
А9	Moskvitch 2	Xeniya Novikova	3:9	4:9	3:8	3:8	5:11	7:5	9:5	7:6	*	3:12	3	6	54,02	9
А10	Komsomoll 1	Elizaveta Trukhina	4:8	2:7	4:8	2:8	3:8	13:7	7:3	4:5	12:3	*	3	6	53,63	8

== Playoffs ==
Page playoff system
1	Krasnodar Krai 1 (Olga Jarkova)	8
2	Adamant 1 (Alina Kovaleva)	2
3	Moscow Oblast 1 (Vlada Rumiantseva)	5
4	Moscow Oblast 2 (Olga Kotelnikova)	10

Semifinal
2	Adamant 1 (Alina Kovaleva)	10
4	Moscow Oblast 2 (Olga Kotelnikova)	4

Final
1	Krasnodar Krai 1 (Olga Jarkova)	3
2	Adamant 1 (Alina Kovaleva)	5

Bronze Medal Game
4	Moscow Oblast 2 (Olga Kotelnikova)	5
3	Moscow Oblast 1 (Vlada Rumiantseva)	6

Quarterfinals. April 12, 10:30

1st vs 2nd

Sheet C	1	2	3	4	5	6	7	8	9	10	Final
Adamant 1 (Alina Kovaleva)	0	1	0	0	0	1	0	0	X	X	2
Krasnodar Krai 1 (Olga Jarkova) 🔨	1	0	1	1	3	0	2	0	X	X	8

3rd vs 4th

Sheet D	1	2	3	4	5	6	7	8	9	10	Final
Moscow Oblast 1 (Vlada Rumiantseva) 🔨	1	0	2	0	1	0	0	1	0	X	5
Moscow Oblast 2 (Olga Kotelnikova)	0	2	0	1	0	2	4	0	1	X	10

Semifinal. April 12, 18:00

Sheet B	1	2	3	4	5	6	7	8	9	10	Final
Moscow Oblast 2 (Olga Kotelnikova)	0	1	0	0	0	0	2	1	0	X	4
Adamant 1 (Alina Kovaleva) 🔨	3	0	0	2	0	3	0	0	2	X	10

Bronze Medal Match. April 13, 12:30

Sheet D	1	2	3	4	5	6	7	8	9	10	Final
Moscow Oblast 1 (Vlada Rumiantseva)	0	1	1	1	1	0	0	0	2	0	6
Moscow Oblast 2 (Olga Kotelnikova) 🔨	2	0	0	0	0	1	0	1	0	1	5

Gold Medal Match. April 13, 12:30

Sheet C	1	2	3	4	5	6	7	8	9	10	Final
Krasnodar Krai 1 (Olga Jarkova) 🔨	1	0	0	1	0	0	0	0	1	0	3
Adamant 1 (Alina Kovaleva)	0	0	2	0	0	2	0	0	0	1	5

== Final standings ==
Place	Team	Skip	Games	Wins	Losses
1st place, gold medalist(s)	Adamant 1	Alina Kovaleva	12	10	2
2nd place, silver medalist(s)	Krasnodar Krai 1	Olga Jarkova	11	10	1
3rd place, bronze medalist(s)	Moscow Oblast 1	Vlada Rumiantseva	11	6	5
4	Moscow Oblast 2	Olga Kotelnikova	12	6	6
5	Team Moscow	Anna Sidorova	9	5	4
6	ShVSM po ZVS	Maria Baksheeva	9	4	5
7	Zekurion-Moskvich	Ekaterina Galkina	9	3	6
8	Komsomoll 1	Elizaveta Trukhina	9	3	6
9	Moskvitch 2	Xeniya Novikova	9	3	6
10	Moskvitch 1	Sophia Orazalina	9	0	9

== See also ==
- 2019 Russian Men's Curling Championship
- 2019 Russian Mixed Curling Championship
- 2019 Russian Mixed Doubles Curling Championship
- 2019 Russian Junior Curling Championships
- 2019 Russian Wheelchair Curling Championship
