= 2019 Russian Men's Curling Championship =

- Host city: Sochi
- Arena: Ice Cube Curling Center
- Dates: April 15–21, 2019
- Winner: Adamant 1 (Saint Petersburg)
- Skip: Alexey Timofeev
- Third: Daniil Goriachev
- Second: Alexey Stukalskiy
- Lead: Artur Razhabov
- Alternate: Evgeny Klimov
- Finalist: Krasnodar Krai 1 (Sochi; Sergey Glukhov)

The 2019 Russian Men's Curling Championship (Russian: Чемпионат России по кёрлингу среди мужчин 2019) was held in Sochi from April 15 to 21, 2019.

== Teams ==
Team	Locale	Skip	Third	Second	Lead	Alternate
Adamant 1	Saint Petersburg	Alexey Timofeev	Daniil Goriachev	Alexey Stukalskiy	Artur Razhabov	Evgeny Klimov
Adamant 2	Saint Petersburg	Panteleimon Lappo	Matvei Vakin	Sergei Varlamov	Nikolai Cherednichenko	Denis Islamov
Moscow Oblast 1	Dmitrov	Mikhail Vaskov	Alexey Tuzov	Petr Kuznetsov	Alexey Kulikov	
Krasnodar Krai 1	Sochi	Sergey Glukhov	Artur Ali	Dmitry Mironov	Anton Kalalb	Aleksandr Kozyrev
Team Moscow	Moscow	Alexander Kirikov	Andrey Drozdov	Vadim Shkolnikov	Sergei Morozov	Dmitry Abanin
Chelyabinsk Oblast 1	Chelyabinsk	Nikita Ivanchatenko	Dmitry Solomatin	Artyom Evdokimov	Konstantin Okruzhnoiy	
MKK-Moskvich	Moscow	Nikolai Levashov (4th)	Vadim Raev (skip)	Evgeny Arkhipov	Lev Puzakov	Artyom Puzanov
Novaya Liga-Moskvich	Moscow	German Doronin	Sergei Andrianov	Dmitry Sirotkin	Danila Tzimbal	Sergei Maksimov
Adamant 3	Saint Petersburg	Oleg Krasikov	Artyom Vaykhonskiy	Danil Kiba	Gleb Lyasnikov	Dmitry Logvin
UOR-ShVSM	Saint Petersburg	Aleksandr Bystrov	Sergei Morozov	Vadim Shvedov	Konstanin Manasevich	Nikita Ignatkov

== Round Robin ==
Key
Teams to Playoffs

	Team	Skip	А1	А2	А3	А4	А5	А6	А7	А8	А9	А10	Wins	Losses	DSC	Place
А1	Adamant 1	Alexey Timofeev	*	9:7	8:6	6:8	9:8	10:7	10:7	9:3	9:7	8:4	8	1	49,57	1
А2	Adamant 2	Panteleimon Lappo	7:9	*	5:3	2:9	1:8	3:8	9:6	2:8	1:7	4:5	2	7	56,25	10
А3	Moscow Oblast 1	Mikhail Vaskov	6:8	3:5	*	7:9	6:7	11:5	6:5	9:7	6:4	2:11	4	5	42,86	5
А4	Krasnodar Krai 1	Sergey Glukhov	8:6	9:2	9:7	*	6:0	9:8	12:5	6:8	7:3	4:5	7	2	43,14	2
А5	Team Moscow	Alexander Kirikov	8:9	8:1	7:6	0:6	*	8:4	8:10	7:6	10:5	8:3	6	3	40,34	3
А6	Chelyabinsk Oblast	Nikita Ivanchatenko	7:10	8:3	5:11	8:9	4:8	*	6:10	9:8	5:8	7:6	3	6	68,64	9
А7	MKK-Moskvich	Vadim Raev	7:10	6:9	5:6	5:12	10:8	10:6	*	4:6	9:7	8:3	4	5	51,33	7
А8	Novaya Liga-Moskvich	German Doronin	3:9	8:2	7:9	8:6	6:7	8:9	6:4	*	10:6	7:8	4	5	56,85	6
А9	Adamant 3	Oleg Krasikov	7:9	7:1	4:6	3:7	5:10	8:5	7:9	6:10	*	10:8	3	6	66,53	8
А10	UOR-ShVSM	Aleksandr Bystrov	4:8	5:4	11:2	5:4	3:8	6:7	3:8	8:7	8:10	*	4	5	84,27	4

== Playoffs ==
Page playoff system
1	Adamant 1 (Alexey Timofeev)	6
2	Krasnodar Krai 1 (Sergey Glukhov)	5
3	Team Moscow (Alexander Kirikov)	7
4	UOR-ShVSM (Aleksandr Bystrov)	5

Semifinal
2	Krasnodar Krai 1 (Sergey Glukhov)	6
3	Team Moscow (Alexander Kirikov)	3

Final
1	Adamant 1 (Alexey Timofeev)	9
2	Krasnodar Krai 1 (Sergey Glukhov)	5

Bronze Medal Game
3	Team Moscow (Alexander Kirikov)	10
4	UOR-ShVSM (Aleksandr Bystrov)	5

Quarterfinals. April 20, 10:30

1st vs 2nd

Sheet A	1	2	3	4	5	6	7	8	9	10	Final
Krasnodar Krai 1 (Sergey Glukhov)	0	0	2	0	0	2	0	0	1	0	5
Adamant 1 (Alexey Timofeev) 🔨	1	0	0	1	2	0	0	1	0	1	6

3rd vs 4th

Sheet C	1	2	3	4	5	6	7	8	9	10	Final
Team Moscow (Alexander Kirikov) 🔨	0	1	0	1	0	1	0	3	0	1	7
UOR-ShVSM (Aleksandr Bystrov)	0	0	0	0	1	0	2	0	2	0	5

Semifinal. April 20, 18:00

Sheet B	1	2	3	4	5	6	7	8	9	10	Final
Krasnodar Krai 1 (Sergey Glukhov) 🔨	0	2	0	1	1	1	0	0	1	X	6
Team Moscow (Alexander Kirikov)	0	0	1	0	0	0	2	0	0	X	3

Bronze Medal Match. April 21, 10:30

Sheet A	1	2	3	4	5	6	7	8	9	10	Final
UOR-ShVSM (Aleksandr Bystrov)	0	1	0	0	0	3	0	1	0	X	5
Team Moscow (Alexander Kirikov) 🔨	2	0	2	1	1	0	2	0	2	X	10

Gold Medal Match. April 21, 10:30

Sheet C	1	2	3	4	5	6	7	8	9	10	Final
Krasnodar Krai 1 (Sergey Glukhov)	0	0	1	0	1	2	0	1	0	0	5
Adamant 1 (Alexey Timofeev) 🔨	0	2	0	1	0	0	1	0	3	2	9

== Final standings ==
Place	Team	Skip	Games	Wins	Losses
1st place, gold medalist(s)	Adamant 1	Alexey Timofeev	11	10	1
2nd place, silver medalist(s)	Krasnodar Krai 1	Sergey Glukhov	12	8	4
3rd place, bronze medalist(s)	Team Moscow	Alexander Kirikov	12	8	4
4	UOR-ShVSM	Aleksandr Bystrov	11	4	7
5	Moscow Oblast 1	Mikhail Vaskov	9	4	5
6	Novaya Liga-Moskvich	German Doronin	9	4	5
7	MKK-Moskvich	Vadim Raev	9	4	5
8	Adamant 3	Oleg Krasikov	9	3	6
9	Chelyabinsk Oblast	Nikita Ivanchatenko	9	3	6
10	Adamant 2	Panteleimon Lappo	9	2	7

== See also ==
- 2019 Russian Women's Curling Championship
- 2019 Russian Mixed Curling Championship
- 2019 Russian Mixed Doubles Curling Championship
- 2019 Russian Junior Curling Championships
- 2019 Russian Wheelchair Curling Championship
