= 2019 Russian Men's Curling Cup =

- Host city: Sochi
- Arena: Ice Cube Curling Center
- Dates: December 2–6, 2019
- Winner: Krasnodar Krai (Sochi)
- Skip: Artur Ali
- Third: Dmitry Mironov
- Second: Arseniy Meshkovich
- Lead: Stepan Sevryukov
- Alternate: Albert Topchyan
- Finalist: Komsomoll 1 (Irkutsk; Artyom Karetnikov)

The 2019 Russian Men's Curling Cup (Russian: Кубок России среди мужских команд 2019) was held from December 2 to December 6 at the Ice Cube Curling Center arena in Sochi.

All games played are 8 ends.

All times are listed in Moscow Time (UTC+03:00)

== Teams ==
Team	Locale	Skip	Third	Second	Lead	Alternate
Chelyabinsk Oblast	Chelyabinsk	Dmitry Solomatin	Yaroslav Uhlman	Anton Mishin	Vyacheslav Mastrukov	Nikita Moskvin
Komsomoll 1	Irkutsk	Andrey Dudov (4th)	Artyom Karetnikov (skip)	Nikolai Lysakov	Mikhail Vlasenko	Kirill Grekhnyov
Krasnodar Krai	Sochi	Artur Ali	Dmitry Mironov	Arseniy Meshkovich	Stepan Sevryukov	Albert Topchyan
Moscow Oblast 1	Dmitrov	Kirill Surovov	Alexey Philippov	Daniil Shmelev	Yuri Shustrov	Ivan Konosevich
Moscow Oblast 2	Dmitrov	Mikhail Vaskov	Alexey Kulikov	Petr Kuznetsov	Kirill Savenkov	
Moskvich 1	Moscow	German Doronin	Timophei Nasonov	Danila Tzimbal	Georgy Epremyan	Alexey Torbin
Moskvich 3	Moscow	Andrei Ilyin	Alexander Burdakov	Artyom Kachimov	Alexander Gapanchuk	Maxim Buylov
Moskvich 4	Moscow	Maxim Shibilkin	Grigory Lavrov	Andrei Shestopalov	Mikhail Golikov	Dmitry Sirotkin
Moskvich-MKK	Moscow	Vadim Raev	Evgeny Arkhipov	Lev Puzakov	Sergei Andrianov	Nikolai Levashov
Novosibirsk Oblast	Novosibirsk	Artyom Shmakov	Nikita Kukunin	Ivan Kazachkov	Daniil Zazulskikh	
Saint Petersburg 1	Saint Petersburg	Oleg Krasikov	Artyom Bukarev	Sergei Varlamov	Danil Kiba	Rudolf Zakharyan
Saint Petersburg 2	Saint Petersburg	Aleksandr Bystrov	Sergei Morozov	Vadim Shvedov	Konstanin Manasevich	Nikita Ignatkov
Saint Petersburg 3	Saint Petersburg	Gleb Lyasnikov	Dmitry Logvin	Matvei Vakin	Alexander Terentjev	Andrei Kozhevin
Saint Petersburg 4	Saint Petersburg	Artur Razhabov	Evgeny Klimov	Panteleimon Lappo	Konstantin Nessler	Nikolai Filaretov
Vorobyovy Gory (Sparrow Hills)	Moscow	Alexander Kirikov	Andrey Drozdov	Vadim Shkolnikov	Sergei Morozov	Dmitry Abanin
Yenisei	Krasnoyarsk	Vasily Groshev	Vladislav Velichko	Valery Kochergin	Pavel Bezrukikh	

== Round robin results and standings ==
Key
Teams to Playoffs

Group A

	Team	Skip	А1	А2	А3	А4	А5	А6	А7	А8	Wins	Losses	DSC, cm	Place
А1	Moscow Oblast 1	Kirill Surovov	*	11:6	4:3	1:5	2:7	7:5	7:8	8:6	4	3	61,68	4
А2	Saint Petersburg 3	Gleb Lyasnikov	6:11	*	4:6	5:6	3:6	3:8	5:9	1:3	0	7	41,27	8
А3	Moskvich 3	Andrei Ilyin	3:4	6:4	*	9:4	4:8	5:6	8:6	6:7	3	4	53,42	7
А4	Saint Petersburg 2	Aleksandr Bystrov	5:1	6:5	4:9	*	6:3	5:4	3:6	3:7	4	3	89,00	3
А5	Novosibirsk Oblast	Artyom Shmakov	7:2	6:3	8:4	3:6	*	7:3	7:6	8:5	6	1	36,67	1
А6	Saint Petersburg 1	Oleg Krasikov	5:7	8:3	6:5	4:5	3:7	*	6:8	7:5	3	4	66,15	5
А7	Moskvich 4	Maxim Shibilkin	8:7	9:5	6:8	6:3	6:7	8:6	*	7:6	5	2	133,94	2
А8	Chelyabinsk Oblast	Dmitry Solomatin	6:8	3:1	7:6	7:3	5:8	5:7	6:7	*	3	4	89,89	6

Group B

	Team	Skip	B1	B2	B3	B4	B5	B6	B7	B8	Wins	Losses	DSC, cm	Place
B1	Moskvich 1	German Doronin	*	6:7	2:5	7:8	4:5	10:9	3:9	3:6	1	6	66,74	8
B2	Moskvich-MKK	Vadim Raev	7:6	*	9:4	5:6	3:7	8:2	7:10	2:6	3	4	49,98	6
B3	Yenisei	Vasily Groshev	5:2	4:9	*	5:7	2:4	4:8	5:6	7:5	2	5	85,54	7
B4	Komsomoll 1	Artyom Karetnikov	8:7	6:5	7:5	*	5:4	6:7	6:5	8:7	6	1	49,09	1
B5	Krasnodar Krai	Artur Ali	5:4	7:3	4:2	4:5	*	7:4	11:5	3:6	5	2	68,63	2
B6	Saint Petersburg 4	Artur Razhabov	9:10	2:8	8:4	7:6	4:7	*	6:4	5:4	4	3	45,75	3
B7	Moscow Oblast 2	Mikhail Vaskov	9:3	10:7	6:5	5:6	5:11	4:6	*	4:5	3	4	72,78	5
B8	Vorobyovy Gory	Alexander Kirikov	6:3	6:2	5:7	7:8	6:3	4:5	5:4	*	4	3	39,04	4

== Playoffs ==
Semifinals
A-1	Novosibirsk Oblast (Artyom Shmakov)	3
B-2	Krasnodar Krai (Artur Ali)	7
B-1	Komsomoll 1 (Artyom Karetnikov)	5
A-2	Moskvich 4 (Maxim Shibilkin)	4

Final
Krasnodar Krai (Artur Ali)	8
Komsomoll 1 (Artyom Karetnikov)	6
Third place
Novosibirsk Oblast (Artyom Shmakov)	10
Moskvich 4 (Maxim Shibilkin)	4

=== Semifinals ===
December 6, 10:00 am

Sheet A	1	2	3	4	5	6	7	8	Final
Krasnodar Krai (Artur Ali)	0	3	0	2	2	0	X	X	7
Novosibirsk Oblast (Artyom Shmakov) 🔨	1	0	1	0	0	1	X	X	3

Sheet B	1	2	3	4	5	6	7	8	9	Final
Komsomoll 1 (Artyom Karetnikov) 🔨	1	0	0	1	1	0	1	0	1	5
Moskvich 4 (Maxim Shibilkin)	0	0	1	0	0	2	0	1	0	4

=== Third place ===
December 6, 3:00 pm

Sheet D	1	2	3	4	5	6	7	8	Final
Novosibirsk Oblast (Artyom Shmakov) 🔨	1	2	1	0	2	0	4	X	10
Moskvich 4 (Maxim Shibilkin)	0	0	0	1	0	3	0	X	4

=== Final ===
December 6, 3:00 pm

Sheet C	1	2	3	4	5	6	7	8	Final
Krasnodar Krai (Artur Ali)	0	3	0	4	0	0	1	0	8
Komsomoll 1 (Artyom Karetnikov) 🔨	2	0	2	0	1	0	0	1	6

== Final standings ==
Place	Team	Skip	Games	Wins	Losses	Place after RR	DSC, cm
1st place, gold medalist(s)	Krasnodar Krai	Artur Ali	9	7	2	2	68,63
2nd place, silver medalist(s)	Komsomoll 1	Artyom Karetnikov	9	7	2	1	49,09
3rd place, bronze medalist(s)	Novosibirsk Oblast	Artyom Shmakov	9	7	2	1	36,67
4	Moskvich 4	Maxim Shibilkin	9	5	4	2	133,94
5	Saint Petersburg 4	Artur Razhabov	7	4	3	3	45,75
6	Saint Petersburg 2	Aleksandr Bystrov	7	4	3	3	89,00
7	Vorobyovy Gory	Alexander Kirikov	7	4	3	4	39,04
8	Moscow Oblast 1	Kirill Surovov	7	4	3	4	61,68
9	Saint Petersburg 1	Oleg Krasikov	7	3	4	5	66,15
10	Moscow Oblast 2	Mikhail Vaskov	7	3	4	5	72,78
11	Moskvich-MKK	Vadim Raev	7	3	4	6	49,98
12	Chelyabinsk Oblast	Dmitry Solomatin	7	3	4	6	89,89
13	Moskvich 3	Andrei Ilyin	7	3	4	7	53,42
14	Yenisei	Vasily Groshev	7	2	5	7	85,54
15	Saint Petersburg 3	Gleb Lyasnikov	7	0	7	8	41,27
16	Moskvich 1	German Doronin	7	1	6	8	66,74

== See also ==
- 2019 Russian Women's Curling Cup
