= 2021 Russian Mixed Doubles Curling Cup =

- Host city: Irkutsk
- Arena: "Baikal" Ice Palace
- Dates: August 27–30
- Winner: Ezekh / Stukalskiy
- Female: Nkeirouka Ezekh
- Male: Alexey Stukalskiy
- Finalist: Babarykina / Manasevich

The 2021 Russian Mixed Doubles Curling Cup was held from August 27 to 30, 2021 at the "Baikal" Ice Palace in Irkutsk.

The championship featured twenty teams split into four pools of five. After the round robin, the top two teams from each pool qualified for the playoffs. In the final, the pair of Nkeirouka Ezekh and Alexey Stukalskiy defeated pair of Anastasia Babarykina and Konstantin Manasevich 9–2 to claim the title.

== Teams ==
The teams competing in the 2021 cup are:

	Team	Female	Male	Coach	Locale
Group A
A1	Saint Petersburg 3	Olga Antonova	Oleg Krasikov	Oleg Krasikov	Saint Petersburg
A2	Moskvitch 1	Ekaterina Telnova	Artem Puzanov	Dmitry Andrianov	Moscow
A3	Tigers Vladivostok	Arina Leontieva	Petr Triandafilidi		Vladivostok
A4	Tomsk	Anastasia Borisova	Roman Serebrennikov	Konstantin Sherstobitov	Tomsk
A5	Moscow Oblast 2	Anastasia Mishchenko	Alexey Tuzov	Anna Gretskaya	Dmitrov
Group B
B1	Team Moscow	Ksenia Novikova	German Doronin	Dmitry Andrianov	Moscow
B2	Saint Petersburg 2	Viktoria Enbaeva	Petr Dron	Petr Dron	Saint Petersburg
B3	Komsomoll 3	Alina Fakhurtdinova	Mikhail Vlasenko	Anna Trukhina, Z. Butaev	Irkutsk
B4	Moscow Oblast 1	Daria Morozova	Kirill Surovov	Anna Gretskaya	Dmitrov
B5	Moskvitch	Maria Tsebriy	Timofey Nasonov	Dmitry Andrianov	Moscow
Group C
C1	Krasnoyarsk Krai 2	Anastasia Krivosheeva	Valentin Andreev	Vladislav Velichko	Krasnoyarsk
C2	Saint Petersburg 1	Nkeirouka Ezekh	Alexey Stukalskiy	Alexey Stukalskiy	Saint Petersburg
C3	Yaroslavl Oblast 2	Maria Beliaeva	Aleksandr Utkin	Vasiliy Telezhkin	Yaroslavl
C4	ShVSM po ZVS	Anastasia Babarykina	Konstantin Manasevich	Yana Garshina	Saint Petersburg
C5	Novosibirsk Oblast	Anna Glazyrina	Evgeny Supletsov		Novosibirsk
Group D
D1	Krasnoyarsk Krai 1	Julia Kuznetsova	Vladislav Velichko		Krasnoyarsk
D2	Komsomoll 1	Elizaveta Trukhina	Nikolay Lysakov	Anna Trukhina, Z. Butaev	Irkutsk
D3	Komsomoll 2	Valeria Denisenko	Kirill Palagney	Anna Trukhina, Z. Butaev	Irkutsk
D4	Moscow Oblast 3	Aleksandra Kardapoltseva	Petr Kuznetsov	Anna Gretskaya	Dmitrov
D5	Yaroslavl Oblast 1	Daria Semenova	Vasiliy Telezhkin	Vasiliy Telezhkin	Yaroslavl

== Round-robin results and standings ==
Key
Teams to Playoffs

=== Group A ===
	Team	A1	A2	A3	A4	A5	Wins	Losses	Points	DSC, cm	Place
A1	Saint Petersburg 3 (Antonova / Krasikov)	*	7:5	9:2	8:3	8:11	3	1	7	39,09	2
A2	Moskvitch 1 (Telnova / Artem Puzanov)	5:7	*	13:4	7:3	1:12	2	2	6	68,29	3
A3	Tigers Vladivostok (Leontieva / Triandafilidi)	2:9	4:13	*	4:8	2:14	0	4	4	130,26	5
A4	Tomsk (Borisova / Serebrennikov)	3:8	3:7	8:4	*	4:9	1	3	5	72,81	4
A5	Moscow Oblast 2 (Mishchenko / Tuzov)	11:8	12:1	14:2	9:4	*	4	0	8	39,91	1

=== Group B ===
	Team	B1	B2	B3	B4	B5	Wins	Losses	Points	DSC, cm	Place
B1	Team Moscow (Novikova / Doronin)	*	5:8	8:3	8:7	5:8	2	2	6	43,99	2
B2	Saint Petersburg 2 (Enbaeva / Dron)	8:5	*	5:7	8:7	6:8	2	2	6	35,91	1
B3	Komsomoll 3 (Fakhurtdinova / Vlasenko)	3:8	7:5	*	6:7	10:4	2	2	6	100,37	5
B4	Moscow Oblast 1 (Morozova / Surovov)	7:8	7:8	7:6	*	8:3	2	2	6	70,89	3
B5	Moskvitch (Tsebriy / Nasonov)	8:5	8:6	4:10	3:8	*	2	2	6	92,31	4

=== Group C ===
	Team	C1	C2	C3	C4	C5	Wins	Losses	Points	DSC, cm	Place
C1	Krasnoyarsk Krai 2 (Krivosheeva / Andreev)	*	5:8	5:10	4:9	10:5	1	3	5	96,20	4
C2	Saint Petersburg 1 (Ezekh / Stukalskiy)	8:5	*	15:1	10:5	12:2	4	0	8	52,23	1
C3	Yaroslavl Oblast 2 (Beliaeva / Utkin)	10:5	1:15	*	2:9	3:7	1	3	5	73,57	3
C4	ShVSM po ZVS (Babarykina / Manasevich)	9:4	5:10	9:2	*	9:4	3	1	7	126,74	2
C5	Novosibirsk Oblast (Glazyrina / Supletsov)	5:10	2:12	7:3	4:9	*	1	3	5	118,23	5

=== Group D ===
	Team	D1	D2	D3	D4	D5	Wins	Losses	Points	DSC, cm	Place
D1	Krasnoyarsk Krai 1 (Kuznetsova / Velichko)	*	8:12	3:8	7:4	6:3	2	2	6	54,06	2
D2	Komsomoll 1 (Trukhina / Lysakov)	12:8	*	6:2	6:2	13:0	4	0	8	47,37	1
D3	Komsomoll 2 (Denisenko / Palagney)	8:3	2:6	*	4:6	10:5	2	2	6	58,66	3
D4	Moscow Oblast 3 (Kardapoltseva / Kuznetsov)	4:7	2:6	6:4	*	12:1	2	2	6	91,84	4
D5	Yaroslavl Oblast 1 (Semenova / Telezhkin)	3:6	0:13	5:10	1:12	*	0	4	4	66,91	5

Points: 2 for win, 1 for loss, 0 for technical loss (did not start)

== Playoffs ==
Quarterfinals
A(1)	Moscow Oblast 2 (Mishchenko / Tuzov)	7
B(2)	Team Moscow (Novikova / Doronin)	1
C(1)	Saint Petersburg 1 (Ezekh / Stukalskiy)	8
D(2)	Krasnoyarsk Krai 1 (Kuznetsova / Velichko)	4
D(1)	Komsomoll 1 (Trukhina / Lysakov)	4
C(2)	ShVSM po ZVS (Babarykina / Manasevich)	6
B(1)	Saint Petersburg 2 (Enbaeva / Dron)	2
A(2)	Saint Petersburg 3 (Antonova / Krasikov)	9

Semifinals
Moscow Oblast 2 (Mishchenko / Tuzov)	3
Saint Petersburg 1 (Ezekh / Stukalskiy)	6
ShVSM po ZVS (Babarykina / Manasevich)	11
Saint Petersburg 3 (Antonova / Krasikov)	10

Final
Saint Petersburg 1 (Ezekh / Stukalskiy)	9
ShVSM po ZVS (Babarykina / Manasevich)	2
Third place
Moscow Oblast 2 (Mishchenko / Tuzov)	11
Saint Petersburg 3 (Antonova / Krasikov)	4

«PP» — Power play

=== Quarterfinals ===
Sunday, August 29, 17:30

Sheet A	1	2	3	4	5	6	7	8	Final
A(1) Moscow Oblast 2 (Mishchenko / Tuzov)	2	1	1	1	1	0	1	X	7
B(2) Team Moscow (Novikova / Doronin)	0	0	0	0	0	1 (PP)	0	X	1

Sheet B	1	2	3	4	5	6	7	8	Final
C(2) ShVSM po ZVS (Babarykina / Manasevich)	0	2	1	0	1	1	0	1	6
D(1) Komsomoll 1 (Trukhina / Lysakov)	1	0	0	1	0	0	2 (PP)	0	4

Sheet C	1	2	3	4	5	6	7	8	Final
A(2) Saint Petersburg 3 (Antonova / Krasikov)	3	0	1	0	2	3	X	X	9
B(1) Saint Petersburg 2 (Enbaeva / Dron)	0	1	0	1	0	0 (PP)	X	X	2

Sheet D	1	2	3	4	5	6	7	8	Final
C(1) Saint Petersburg 1 (Ezekh / Stukalskiy)	2	1	2	0	3	0	0	X	8
D(2) Krasnoyarsk Krai 1 (Kuznetsova / Velichko)	0	0	0	2 (PP)	0	1	1	X	4

=== Semifinals ===
Monday, August 30, 10:00

Sheet A	1	2	3	4	5	6	7	8	9	Final
ShVSM po ZVS (Babarykina / Manasevich)	5	0	4	0	1	0	0	0 (PP)	1	11
Saint Petersburg 3 (Antonova / Krasikov)	0	2	0	2 (PP)	0	1	2	3	0	10

Sheet B	1	2	3	4	5	6	7	8	Final
Moscow Oblast 2 (Mishchenko / Tuzov)	1	1	0	0	1	0	0 (PP)	X	3
Saint Petersburg 1 (Ezekh / Stukalskiy)	0	0	2	2	0	1	1	X	6

=== Third place match ===
Monday, August 30, 14:00

Sheet D	1	2	3	4	5	6	7	8	Final
Moscow Oblast 2 (Mishchenko / Tuzov)	6	1	2	0	0	2	X	X	11
Saint Petersburg 3 (Antonova / Krasikov)	0	0	0	3 (PP)	1	0	X	X	4

=== Final ===
Monday, August 30, 14:00

Sheet C	1	2	3	4	5	6	7	8	Final
Saint Petersburg 1 (Ezekh / Stukalskiy)	5	2	0	0	1	1	X	X	9
ShVSM po ZVS (Babarykina / Manasevich)	0	0	1	1	0	0 (PP)	X	X	2

== Final standings ==
Place	Team (female / male)	Games played	Wins	Losses	Place after RR	DSC, cm
1st place, gold medalist(s)	Saint Petersburg 1 (Nkeirouka Ezekh / Alexey Stukalskiy)	7	7	0	1	52,23
2nd place, silver medalist(s)	ShVSM po ZVS (Anastasia Babarykina / Konstantin Manasevich)	7	5	2	2	126,74
3rd place, bronze medalist(s)	Moscow Oblast 2 (Anastasia Mishchenko / Alexey Tuzov)	7	6	1	1	39,91
4	Saint Petersburg 3 (Olga Antonova / Oleg Krasikov)	7	4	3	2	39,09
5	Saint Petersburg 2 (Viktoria Enbaeva / Petr Dron)	5	2	3	1	35,91
6	Team Moscow (Ksenia Novikova / German Doronin)	5	2	3	2	43,99
7	Komsomoll 1 (Elizaveta Trukhina / Nikolay Lysakov)	5	4	1	1	47,37
8	Krasnoyarsk Krai 1 (Julia Kuznetsova / Vladislav Velichko)	5	2	3	2	54,06
9	Komsomoll 2 (Valeria Denisenko / Kirill Palagney)	4	2	2	3	58,66
10	Moskvitch 1 (Ekaterina Telnova / Artem Puzanov)	4	2	2	3	68,29
11	Moscow Oblast 1 (Daria Morozova / Kirill Surovov)	4	2	2	3	70,89
12	Yaroslavl Oblast 2 (Maria Beliaeva / Aleksandr Utkin)	4	1	3	3	73,57
13	Tomsk (Anastasia Borisova / Roman Serebrennikov)	4	1	3	4	72,81
14	Moscow Oblast 3 (Aleksandra Kardapoltseva / Petr Kuznetsov)	4	2	2	4	91,84
15	Moskvitch (Maria Tsebriy / Timofey Nasonov)	4	2	2	4	92,31
16	Krasnoyarsk Krai 2 (Anastasia Krivosheeva / Valentin Andreev)	4	1	3	4	96,20
17	Yaroslavl Oblast 1 (Daria Semenova / Vasiliy Telezhkin)	4	0	4	5	66.91
18	Komsomoll 3 (Alina Fakhurtdinova / Mikhail Vlasenko)	4	2	2	5	100,37
19	Novosibirsk Oblast (Anna Glazyrina / Evgeny Supletsov)	4	1	3	5	118,23
20	Tigers Vladivostok (Arina Leontieva / Petr Triandafilidi)	4	0	4	5	130,26
