= Russian Curling Championships =

National Championships for curling in Russia

- Established: 1992
- 2024 host city: Sochi
- 2024 arena: Iceberg Skating Palace

Current champions (2024)
- Men: Alexey Timofeev
- Women: Irina Riazanova

The Russian Curling Championships are annual national curling tournaments held in Russia between various Russian curling clubs. The national championships were introduced during the 1992–93 season, after the Russian Curling Federation was formed the previous year. The championships are played over a season from winter to spring.

== Champions ==
Year	Men		Women		Host
Year	Winning subject	Winning team	Winning subject	Winning team	Host
1993	Saint Petersburg	"Force-Majeure"; Igor Minin *, Dmitry Melnikov, O. Tulantyev, D. Antonik	Vologda	"VGPI"; V. Shakhnina *	St. Petersburg, Russia
1994	Saint Petersburg	"Obukhovets"; Alexandr Kolesnikov *, O. Tulantyev, Alexey Tselousov, Viktor Vorobyov	Saint Petersburg	"Curling Club"; Tatyana Smirnova *	Russia
1995	Saint Petersburg	"Obukhovets"; Igor Minin *, Yuri Shuliko, D. Antonik, Dmitry Melnikov	Saint Petersburg	"SKA VMF"; Tatyana Smirnova *	Russia
1996	Saint Petersburg	"SKA"; Alexandr Kolesnikov *, Viktor Vorobyov, Evgeny Izotov, Matvey Vakin	Saint Petersburg	"SKA"; Tatyana Smirnova *	Russia
1997	Saint Petersburg	"Godiva"; Igor Minin *, S. Stepanov, Dmitry Melnikov, D. Antonik	Saint Petersburg	"SKA"; Tatyana Smirnova *	Russia
1998	Saint Petersburg	"SKA-1"; Alexandr Kolesnikov *, Matvey Vakin, Evgeny Izotov, Sergey Evert	Saint Petersburg	"SKA"; Tatyana Smirnova *	Russia
1999	Saint Petersburg	"Lasgaftovets"; Konstantin Zadvornov *, Dmitry Melnikov, O. Tulantyev, Vasily Sepsyakov	Moscow	"Dynamo"; Nina Golovtchenko *	Russia
2000	Saint Petersburg	"SKA-1"; Alexey Tselousov *, D. Ryzhkov, Viktor Vorobyov, Matvey Vakin	Saint Petersburg	"SKA-1"; Yana Nekrasova *	Russia
2001	Saint Petersburg	"SKA-1"; Alexey Tselousov *, D. Ryzhkov, Viktor Vorobyov, Matvey Vakin	Moscow	"ESVSM Moskvich"; Nina Golovtchenko *	Russia
2002	Saint Petersburg	"SKA-2"; Valery Pechersky *, S. Lebedev, Anton Nichiporovich, Sergey Burmistrov	Moscow	"ESVSM Moskvich-1"; Olga Zharkova *	Russia
2003	Saint Petersburg	"SKA-1"; Alexey Tselousov *, D. Ryzhkov, Viktor Vorobyov, Pavel Makukha	Moscow	"ESVSM Moskvich-1"; Olga Zharkova *	Russia
2004	Saint Petersburg	"Rosin"; Igor Minin *, Dmitry Melnikov, V. Stepanov, S. Zakharov, Alexandr Boyko	Moscow	"Moskva"; Olga Zharkova *	Russia
2005	Moscow	"Moskva"; Alexandr Kirikov *, Vladimir Shkolnikov, Alexey Kamnev, Dmitry Abanin, Anton Kalalb, Andrey Drozdov	Moscow	"Moskva"; Olga Zharkova *	Russia
2006	Moscow	"Moskvich-1"; Alexandr Kirikov *, Vladimir Shkolnikov, Alexey Kamnev, Dmitry Abanin	Moscow	"Moskvich-1"; Liudmila Privivkova *, Ekaterina Galkina, Margarita Fomina, Olga Andrianova, Anya Rubtsova	Russia
2007	Saint Petersburg	"Lesgaftovets"; Anton Bobrov *, Pyotr Dron, Dmitry Melnikov, Alexandr Boyko, Andrey Korzhev	Moscow	"Moskvich"; Olga Zharkova *, Nkeiruka Ezekh, Anzhela Tyuvaeva, Olga Zyablikova, Galina Arsenkina	Russia
2008	Moscow	"Moskvich-1"; Alexandr Kirikov *, Vladimir Shkolnikov, Alexey Kamnev, Dmitry Abanin	Moscow	"Moskva"; Olga Zharkova *, Nkeiruka Ezekh, Anna Sidorova, Galina Arsenkina, Olga Zyablikova	Russia
2009	Moscow	"Moskvich"; Andrey Drozdov *, Alexey Stukalskiy, Anton Kalalb, Viktor Kornev	Moscow	"Moskva"; Olga Zharkova *, Nkeiruka Ezekh, Anna Sidorova, Galina Arsenkina, Olga Zyablikova	Russia
2010	Moscow	"Moskvich"; Alexandr Kirikov *, Roman Kutuzov, Vladimir Shkolnikov, Aleksandr Kozyrev, Evgeny Ryabyshev	Moscow	"Moskva"; Olga Zharkova *, Nkeiruka Ezekh, Anna Sidorova, Galina Arsenkina, Olga Zyablikova	Russia
2011	Saint Petersburg	"Adamant"; Alexey Tselousov *, Alexey Kamnev, Pyotr Dron, Artur Razhabov, Alexandr Badilin	Moscow	"Moskvich-1"; Liudmila Privivkova *, Margarita Fomina, Ekaterina Antonova, Ekaterina Galkina	Russia
2012	Moscow	"Moskvich"; Andrey Drozdov * Alexey Stukalskiy, Artyom Bolduzev, Anton Kalalb	Moscow	"Moskva-1"; Anna Sidorova *, Olga Zyablikova, Nkeiruka Ezekh, Galina Arsenkina	Dmitrov; St. Petersburg
2013	Saint Petersburg	"Adamant"; Alexey Tselousov *, Artyom Shmakov, Mikhail Bruskov, Pyotr Dron	Moscow	"Moskva-2"; Liudmila Privivkova *, Margarita Fomina, Ekaterina Galkina, Ekaterina Antonova	Dmitrov
2014	Saint Petersburg	"Adamant-1"; Alexey Tselousov *, Artyom Shmakov, Alexey Timofeev, Evgeny Klimov	Moscow	"Moskva-1"; Anna Sidorova *, Nkeiruka Ezekh, Olga Zyablikova, Alexandra Saitova, Anastasia Beginina	Sochi
2015	Saint Petersburg	"Adamant-2"; Andrey Drozdov *, Alexey Stukalskiy, Artur Razhabov, Anton Kalalb, Pyotr Dron	Moscow	"Moskva-1"; Anna Sidorova *, Margarita Fomina, Alexandra Saitova, Ekaterina Galkina, Nkeiruka Ezekh	Sochi
2016	Saint Petersburg	"Adamant-1"; Alexey Stukalskiy *, Andrey Drozdov, Artur Razhabov, Anton Kalalb, Petr Dron	Moscow	"Moskva-1"; Anna Sidorova *, Margarita Fomina, Alexandra Saitova, Nkeiruka Ezekh, Ekaterina Galkina	Sochi
2017	Krasnodar Krai	"Krasnodarsky Krai 1"; Evgeny Arkhipov *, Alexander Kozyrev, Dmitry Mironov, Sergey Glukhov	Krasnodar Krai	"Krasnodarsky Krai"; Olga Zharkova *, Yulia Portunova, Galina Arsenkina, Julia Guzieva, Liudmila Privivkova	Sochi
2018	Saint Petersburg	"Adamant-1"; Alexey Stukalskiy *, Andrey Drozdov, Petr Dron, Artur Razhabov, Panteleimon Lappo	Moscow	"Vorobyovy Gory 1"; Anna Sidorova *, Margarita Fomina, Alexandra Raeva, Nkeiruka Ezekh, Evgeniya Demkina	Sochi
2019 (men, women)	Saint Petersburg	"Adamant-1"; Alexey Timofeev *, Daniil Goriachev, Alexey Stukalskiy, Artur Razhabov, Evgeny Klimov	Saint Petersburg	"Adamant 1"; Alina Kovaleva *, Anastasia Bryzgalova, Anastasia Danshina, Ekaterina Kuzmina, Uliana Vasilyeva	Sochi
2020	Saint Petersburg	Alexey Timofeev *, Daniil Goriachev, Evgeny Klimov, Artur Razhabov	Saint Petersburg	Alina Kovaleva *, Maria Komarova, Galina Arsenkina, Ekaterina Kuzmina, Vera Tiuliakova	Sochi
2021	Saint Petersburg	Alexey Timofeev*, Artur Razhabov, Evgeny Klimov, Daniil Goriachev	Krasnodar Krai	Olga Jarkova*, Maria Ignatenko, Ekaterina Gavrilenko, Polina Murzina	Sochi
2022	Moscow	Alexander Eremin*, Mikhail Vaskov, Alexey Tuzov, Alexey Kulikov, Pyotr Kuznetsov	Saint Petersburg	Nkeirouka Ezekh*, Diana Margaryan, Alina Borodulina, Anastasia Kilchevskaya, Olga Antonova	Sochi
2023	Saint Petersburg	Alexey Timofeev*, Alexander Krushelnitskiy, Artur Razhabov, Daniil Goriachev, Petr Dron	Krasnodar Krai	Anna Sidorova*, Viktoria Enbaeva, Sofia Tkach, Liudmila Privivkova	Sochi
2024	Saint Petersburg	Alexey Timofeev*, Alexander Krushelnitskiy, Artur Razhabov, Daniil Goriachev, Evgeny Klimov	Moscow Oblast	Irina Riazanova*, Daria Morozova, Anastasia Mischenko, Alexandra Melnikova, Daria Steksova	Sochi

* Skip

== All time medals ==
As of the conclusion of the 2024 Russian Men's Curling Championship

=== Men ===
Rank	Subject	Gold	Silver	Bronze	Total
1	St. Petersburg	24	17	15	56
2	Moscow	7	9	12	28
3	Krasnodar Krai	2	4	0	6
4	Moscow Oblast	0	3	1	4
5	Irkutsk Oblast	0	1	1	2
6	Chelyabinsk	0	0	1	1
6	Dmitrov	0	0	1	1
6	Novosibirsk Oblast	0	0	1	1

=== Women ===
Rank	Subject	Gold	Silver	Bronze	Total
1	Moscow	18	10	11	39
2	Saint Petersburg	9	17	11	37
3	Krasnodar Krai	4	3	0	7
4	Vologda	1	1	3	5
5	Moscow Oblast	1	0	5	6
6	Kaliningrad	0	1	2	3
7	Sochi	0	1	1	2
