= 2006 European Curling Championships =

International curling competition

The 2006 European Curling Championships were held December 9–16, 2006 at the St. Jakobshalle in Basel, Switzerland.

== Men Division A ==
=== Teams ===
| Denmark | Finland | France |
|---|---|---|
| Skip: Johnny Frederiksen Third: Lars Vilandt; Second: Bo Jensen; Lead: Kenneth Hertsdahl; Alternate: Ivan Frederiksen | Skip: Markku Uusipaavalniemi Third: Kalle Kiiskinen; Second: Jani Sullanmaa; Lead: Teemu Salo; Alternate: Jari Rouvinen | Skip: Thomas Dufour Third: Tony Angiboust; Second: Jan Ducroz; Lead: Richard Ducroz; Alternate: Raphael Mathieu |
| Germany | Ireland | Norway |
| Skip: Sebastian Stock Third: Daniel Herberg; Second: Markus Messenzehl; Lead: Patrick Hoffman; Alternate: Bernhard Mayr | Skip: Robin Gray Third: John Kenny; Second: Neil Fyfe; Lead: Peter Wilson; Alternate: Tony Tierney | Skip: Thomas Ulsrud Third: Torger Nergaard; Second: Thomas Due; Lead: Jan Thoresen; Alternate: Petter Moe |
| Scotland | Sweden | Switzerland |
| Skip: David Murdoch Third: Ewan MacDonald; Second: Peter Smith; Lead: Euan Byers; Alternate: David Hay | Skip: Per Carlsen Third: Mickael Norberg; Second: Rickard Hallström; Lead: Fredrik Hallström; Alternate: Nils Carlsen | Skip: Andreas Schwaller Third: Ralph Stöckli; Second: Thomas Lips; Lead: Damian Grichting; Alternate: Raphael Brütsch |
| Wales | | |
| Skip: Adrian Meikle Third: Jamie Meikle; Second: Stuart Hills; Lead: Andrew Tanner; Alternate: Colin Morrison | | |

=== A tournament ===
==== Final round-robin standings ====
| Country | Skip | W | L |
|---|---|---|---|
| Scotland | David Murdoch | 7 | 2 |
| Switzerland | Andreas Schwaller | 7 | 2 |
| Germany | Sebastian Stock | 6 | 3 |
| Sweden | Per Carlsen | 5 | 4 |
| Norway | Thomas Ulsrud | 5 | 4 |
| Finland | Markku Uusipaavalniemi | 5 | 4 |
| Denmark | Johnny Frederiksen | 3 | 6 |
| Ireland | Robin Gray | 3 | 6 |
| France | Thomas Dufour | 3 | 6 |
| Wales | Adrian Meikle | 1 | 8 |

==== Session 1 ====
December 9, 2006

| Switzerland | 8–6 | France |
| Finland | 5–6 | Germany |
| Denmark | 4–5 | Ireland |
| Wales | 7–9 | Scotland |
| Norway | 5–6 | Sweden |

==== Session 2 ====
December 9, 2006

| Denmark | 9–7 | France |
| Scotland | 10–3 | Germany |
| Sweden | 8–6 | Ireland |
| Wales | 3–8 | Switzerland |
| Norway | 8–7 | Finland |

==== Session 3 ====
December 10, 2006

| Scotland | 6–4 | Sweden |
| France | 9–7 | Wales |
| Germany | 3–4 | Norway |
| Ireland | 5–8 | Switzerland |
| Denmark | 2–8 | Finland |

==== Session 4 ====
December 11, 2006

| Wales | 7–8 | Ireland |
| France | 5–10 | Germany |
| Scotland | 5–4 | Norway |
| Denmark | 1–4 | Switzerland |
| Sweden | 5–7 | Finland |

==== Session 5 ====
December 11, 2006

| Germany | 10–7 | Ireland |
| Sweden | 5–6 | Switzerland |
| Scotland | 11–5 | France |
| Denmark | 2–8 | Norway |
| Wales | 8–9 | Finland |

==== Session 6 ====
December 12, 2006

| Wales | 2–7 | Sweden |
| Denmark | 4–7 | Germany |
| France | 4–9 | Norway |
| Scotland | 8–3 | Switzerland |
| Ireland | 6–9 | Finland |

==== Session 7 ====
December 12, 2006

| Wales | 6–4 | Germany |
| France | 2–8 | Sweden |
| Scotland | 7–9 | Denmark |
| Finland | 4–7 | Switzerland |
| Norway | 4–6 | Ireland |

==== Session 8 ====
December 13, 2006

| Wales | 5–7 | Norway |
| France | 6–2 | Finland |
| Scotland | 7–1 | Ireland |
| Denmark | 5–7 | Sweden |
| Switzerland | 3–7 | Germany |

==== Session 9 ====
December 14, 2006

| Wales | 5–7 | Denmark |
| France | 8–2 | Ireland |
| Scotland | 3–9 | Finland |
| Norway | 2–6 | Switzerland |
| Sweden | 4–5 | Germany |

==== Tie-breakers ====
December 14, 2006

| Finland | 5–6 | Norway |
| Ireland | 4–5 | France |
| Denmark | 5–6 | France |
| Sweden | 7–6 | Norway |

==== Play-off ====
December 15, 2006

| Sweden | 6–2 | Germany |
| Switzerland | 9–5 | Scotland |

==== Semi final ====
December 15, 2006

| Sweden | 2–5 | Scotland |

==== Final ====
December 16, 2006

| Switzerland | 7–6 | Scotland |

== Men Division B ==
=== Teams Group 1 ===
| Austria | Belgium | Bulgaria |
|---|---|---|
| Skip: Harald Fendt Third: Andreas Schlögel; Second: Peter Mondl; Lead: Markus Schlögel; Alternate: Hubert Hierner | Skip: Pieter-Jan Witzig Third: Marc Suter; Second: Thomas Suter; Lead: Samie Witzig; Alternate: Dirk Heylen | Skip: Lubomir Velinov Third: Tihomir Todorov; Second: Stoil Georgiev; Lead: Svetlin Rangelov; Alternate: Ilian Kirilov |
| Croatia | Czech Republic | Italy |
| Skip: Alen Cadez Third: Dalibor Golec; Second: Drazen Gutic; Lead: Ognjen Golubic; Alternate: Davor Palcec | Skip: Jiri Snitil Third: Martin Snitil; Second: Jindrich Kitzberger; Lead: Marek Vydra; Alternate: Marek David | Skip: Stefano Ferronato Third: Alessandro Zisa; Second: Marco Mariani; Lead: Adriano Lorenzi; Alternate: Giorgio da Rin |
| Latvia | Lithuania | Slovakia |
| Skip: Kārlis Smilga Third: Artis Zentelis; Second: Roberts Krusts; Lead: Jānis Laizāns; Alternate: Jānis Klīve | Skip: Arunas Skrolis Third: Paulius Kamarauskas; Second: Irtmantas Jakutis; Lead: Martynas Norkus; Alternate: Vygantas Zalieckas | Skip: Frantisek Pitonak Third: Milan Kajan; Second: Boris Kutka; Lead: Rene Petko; Alternate: Karel Pospichal |
Spain
Skip: Luis Domingo Vicent Third: Hector Manero Vicente; Second: Jesus Manero Casas; Lead: Javier Fernandez Dominguez; Alternate: Juan Pablo Percides Pla

=== Standings ===
| Country | G | W | L |
|---|---|---|---|
| Italy | 9 | 9 | 0 |
| Czech Republic | 9 | 8 | 1 |
| Belgium | 9 | 7 | 2 |
| Latvia | 9 | 6 | 3 |
| Slovakia | 9 | 5 | 4 |
| Bulgaria | 9 | 4 | 5 |
| Austria | 9 | 3 | 6 |
| Croatia | 9 | 2 | 7 |
| Spain | 9 | 1 | 8 |
| Lithuania | 9 | 0 | 9 |

=== Teams Group 2 ===
| Belarus | England | Estonia |
|---|---|---|
| Skip: Yauhen Puchkou Third: Ihar Mishaniou; Second: Yauheni Mamadaliyeu; Lead: Barys Rutman; Alternate: Dmitry Kirillov | Skip: Michael Opel Third: Jamie Malton; Second: Andrew Woolston; Lead: Kenneth Malton; Alternate: John Brown | Skip: Leo Jakobson Third: Andres Jakobson; Second: Sven Petermann; Lead: Juri Rouk; Alternate: none |
| Greece | Hungary | Kazakhstan |
| Skip: Athanasios Pantios Third: Nikolaos Zacharias; Second: Dimitrios Kolonas; Lead: Nicholas Sarris; Alternate: Efstratios Kokkinellis | Skip: Gyoergy Nagy Third: Balazs Nemeth; Second: Zoltan Jakab; Lead: Krisztian Barna; Alternate: Zsombor Rokusfalvy | Skip: Viktor Kim Third: Vladislav Kogay; Second: Zhanibek Ukubayev; Lead: Bashir Chimirov; Alternate: Arman Kassenov |
| Netherlands | Poland | Russia |
| Skip: Steven van der Cammen Third: Reg Wiebe; Second: Mark Neeleman; Lead: Christiaan Offringa; Alternate: Greg Dunn | Skip: Damian Herman Third: Piotr Podgórski; Second: Krzysztof Beck; Lead: Tomasz Sapiński; Alternate: Maciej Cesarz | Skip: Alexander Kirikov Third: Petr Dron; Second: Dmitriy Abanin; Lead: Aleksey Kamnev; Alternate: Vadim Shkolnikov |
Serbia
Skip: Marko Stojanovic Third: Darko Sovran; Second: Bojan Mijatovic; Lead: Vuk Krajacic; Alternate: none

=== Standings ===
| Country | G | W | L |
|---|---|---|---|
| Russia | 9 | 9 | 0 |
| England | 9 | 7 | 2 |
| Netherlands | 9 | 7 | 2 |
| Hungary | 9 | 7 | 2 |
| Poland | 9 | 5 | 4 |
| Greece | 9 | 3 | 6 |
| Belarus | 9 | 3 | 6 |
| Serbia | 9 | 2 | 7 |
| Estonia | 9 | 2 | 7 |
| Kazakhstan | 9 | 0 | 9 |

=== Tie-breakers ===
December 13–14, 2006

| Hungary | 8–5 | Netherlands |
| Hungary | 12–6 | England |

=== Play-off ===
December 14, 2006

| Italy | 6–4 | Russia |
| Hungary | 3–8 | Czech Republic |

=== Semi final ===
December 15, 2006

| Russia | 7–12 | Czech Republic |

=== Final ===
December 15, 2006

| Italy | 6–9 | Czech Republic |

=== World Cup Challenge ===
December 16, 2006

| Denmark | 2–1 | Czech Republic |

== Women Division A ==
=== Teams ===
| Czech Republic | Denmark | Germany |
|---|---|---|
| Skip: Hana Synackova Third: Lenka Danielisova; Second: Lenka Kucerova; Lead: Karolina Pilarova; Alternate: Michala Souhradová | Fourth: Madeleine Dupont Third: Camilla Jensen; Second: Denise Dupont; Skip: Angelina Jensen; Alternate: Charlotte Hedegaard | Skip: Andrea Schöpp Third: Monika Wagner; Second: Anna Hartelt; Lead: Marie-Therese Rotter; Alternate: Martina Tichatschke |
| Italy | Netherlands | Norway |
| Skip: Diana Gaspari Third: Giulia Lacedelli; Second: Giorgia Apollonio; Lead: Violetta Caldart; Alternate: Elettra de Col | Skip: Shari Leibbrandt Third: Margrietha Voskuilen; Second: Idske de Jong; Lead: Marlijn Muller; Alternate: Ester Romijn | Skip: Dordi Nordby Third: Marianne Rørvik; Second: Charlotte Hovring; Lead: Camilla Holth; Alternate: Kristin Skaslien |
| Russia | Scotland | Sweden |
| Skip: Ludmila Privivkova Third: Olga Jarkova; Second: Nkeirouka Ezekh; Lead: Ekaterina Galkina; Alternate: Margarita Fomina | Skip: Rhona Martin Third: Debbie Knox; Second: Claire Milne; Lead: Lynn Cameron; Alternate: Jacqui Byers | Skip: Camilla Johansson Third: Katarina Nyberg; Second: Mio Hasselborg; Lead: Elisabeth Persson; Alternate: Linda Ohlson |
| Switzerland | | |
| Skip: Mirjam Ott Third: Binia Feltscher-Beeli; Second: Valeria Spälty; Lead: Janine Greiner; Alternate: Manuela Kormann | | |

==== Standings ====
| Country | G | W | L |
|---|---|---|---|
| Russia | 9 | 9 | 0 |
| Italy | 9 | 6 | 3 |
| Switzerland | 9 | 6 | 3 |
| Scotland | 9 | 5 | 4 |
| Germany | 9 | 5 | 4 |
| Sweden | 9 | 5 | 4 |
| Denmark | 9 | 4 | 5 |
| Czech Republic | 9 | 3 | 6 |
| Norway | 9 | 2 | 7 |
| Netherlands | 9 | 0 | 9 |

=== Results ===
==== Session 1 ====
December 9, 2006

| Scotland | 5–2 | Czech Republic |
| Denmark | 3–7 | Sweden |
| Norway | 9–3 | Netherlands |
| Russia | 12–6 | Switzerland |
| Germany | 8–5 | Italy |

==== Session 2 ====
December 9, 2006

| Germany | 0–9 | Denmark |
| Netherlands | 6–9 | Italy |
| Scotland | 2–7 | Russia |
| Norway | 6–4 | Czech Republic |
| Sweden | 8–6 | Switzerland |

==== Session 3 ====
December 10, 2006

| Switzerland | 4–7 | Italy |
| Czech Republic | 5–9 | Russia |
| Sweden | 4–8 | Germany |
| Netherlands | 2–6 | Scotland |
| Norway | 2–9 | Denmark |

==== Session 4 ====
December 10, 2006

| Czech Republic | 9–8 | Sweden |
| Norway | 5–7 | Scotland |
| Denmark | 6–7 | Italy |
| Switzerland | 7–6 | Germany |
| Russia | 14–3 | Netherlands |

==== Session 5 ====
December 11, 2006

| Norway | 2–10 | Germany |
| Sweden | 7–2 | Netherlands |
| Czech Republic | 2–9 | Switzerland |
| Denmark | 6–10 | Russia |
| Italy | 2–6 | Scotland |

==== Session 6 ====
December 11, 2006

| Italy | 4–6 | Russia |
| Scotland | 4–5 | Switzerland |
| Netherlands | 7–9 | Denmark |
| Sweden | 7–5 | Norway |
| Czech Republic | 5–10 | Germany |

==== Session 7 ====
December 12, 2006

| Denmark | 8–4 | Scotland |
| Italy | 6–5 | Czech Republic |
| Russia | 7–3 | Sweden |
| Germany | 9–3 | Netherlands |
| Switzerland | 6–5 | Norway |

==== Session 8 ====
December 13, 2006

| Netherlands | 5–6 | Switzerland |
| Russia | 9–6 | Germany |
| Italy | 9–5 | Norway |
| Czech Republic | 8–7 | Denmark |
| Scotland | 2–5 | Sweden |

==== Session 9 ====
December 13, 2006

| Russia | 7–5 | Norway |
| Switzerland | 7–3 | Denmark |
| Germany | 3–6 | Scotland |
| Italy | 9–2 | Sweden |
| Netherlands | 4–11 | Czech Republic |

==== Tie-breakers ====
December 14, 2006

| Scotland | 7–6 | Sweden |
| Scotland | 4–3 | Germany |

==== Play-off ====
December 15, 2006

| Russia | 5–7 | Italy |
| Switzerland | 8–3 | Scotland |

==== Semi final ====
December 15, 2006

| Switzerland | 5–7 | Russia |

==== Final ====
December 16, 2006

| Russia | 9–4 | Italy |

== Women Division B ==
=== Teams ===
| Austria | Croatia | England |
|---|---|---|
| Skip: Claudia Toth Third: Karina Toth; Second: Constanze Hummelt; Lead: Alexandra Bruckmiller; Alternate: none | Skip: Katarina Radonic Third: Nikolina Petric; Second: Zrinka Muhek; Lead: Marta Muzdalo; Alternate: Slavica Roso | Skip: Joan Reed Third: Lorna Rettig; Second: Claire Grimwood; Lead: Kirsty Balfour; Alternate: Sarah McVey |
| Estonia | Finland | France |
| Skip: Maile Moelder Third: Marge Vaher; Second: Anne-Liis Leht; Lead: Margit Peebo; Alternate: none | Skip: Anne Malmi Third: Mimmi Koivula; Second: Sari Auvinen; Lead: Katri Maatta; Alternate: Tuire Autio | Skip: Sandrine Morand Third: Karine Baechelen; Second: Delphine Charlet; Lead: Brigitte Mathieu; Alternate: Alexandra Seimbille |
| Hungary | Latvia | Lithuania |
| Skip: Ildikó Szekeres Third: Alexandra Béres; Second: Gyoengyi Nagy; Lead: Boglarka Adam; Alternate: none | Skip: Evita Regza Third: Dace Regza; Second: Anete Regza; Lead: Solvita Gulbe; Alternate: none | Skip: Virginija Paulauskaitė Third: Evelina Alekseijenko; Second: Ruta Norkiene; Lead: Rasa Smaliukiene; Alternate: none |
| Poland | Slovakia | Spain |
| Skip: Marta Szeliga-Frynia Third: Katarzyna Wicik; Second: Agnieszka Ogrodniczek; Lead: Marianna Das; Alternate: Justyna Zalewska | Skip: Barbora Bugarova Third: Gabriela Kajanova; Second: Veronika Kvasnovska; Lead: Zuzana Axamitova; Alternate: none | Skip: Ellen Kittelsen Third: Ana Arce; Second: Leti Hino Josa; Lead: Merce Pascual; Alternate: Martina Zurlohe |

=== Standings Group 1 ===
| Country | G | W | L |
|---|---|---|---|
| England | 5 | 4 | 1 |
| France | 5 | 4 | 1 |
| Austria | 5 | 4 | 1 |
| Spain | 5 | 2 | 3 |
| Estonia | 5 | 1 | 4 |
| Lithuania | 5 | 0 | 5 |

=== Standings Group 2 ===
| Country | G | W | L |
|---|---|---|---|
| Finland | 5 | 5 | 0 |
| Hungary | 5 | 4 | 1 |
| Poland | 5 | 3 | 2 |
| Latvia | 5 | 2 | 3 |
| Slovakia | 5 | 1 | 4 |
| Croatia | 5 | 0 | 5 |

=== Tie-breakers ===
December 13, 2006

| Austria | 7–6 | France |

=== Play-off ===
December 14, 2006

| England | 4–7 | Finland |
| Hungary | 8–9 | Austria |

=== Semi final ===
December 15, 2006

| Austria | 8–6 | England |

=== Final ===
December 15, 2006

| Austria | 7–3 | Finland |
