= Anastasia Skultan =

Russian curler

Anastasia Yuryevna Skultan Анастасия Юрьевна Скултан
- Curler ♀
- Born: 18 February 1984 (age 42); Moscow, USSR

Team
- Curling club: Moskvitch CC, Moscow

Curling career
- World Championship: 3 (2001, 2002, 2003)
- European Championship: 2 (2000, 2002)
- Olympic: 1 (2002)
- Other appearances: World Junior Championships: 4 (1999, 2000, 2001, 2002), Winter Universiade: 1 (2003)
Medal record
Curling
Representing Russia
Winter Universiade
Gold medal – first place	2003 Tarvisio
Russian Women's Championship
Bronze medal – third place	2008 Moscow	{{{2}}}

Anastasia Yuryevna Skultan (Russian: Анастаси́я Ю́рьевна Ску́лтан; born 18 February 1984) is a Russian curler from Moscow. She has played in five World Junior Curling Championships (1999, 2000, 2001, 2002 & 2003 [World Junior "B" in 2003]), two European Curling Championships (2000 & 2002), three World Curling Championships (2001, 2002 & 2003) and the 2002 Winter Olympics.

At the Olympics, Skultan played lead position for skip Olga Jarkova. The team finished in last place. Her top result in the World Championships was in 2003, when the team finished in sixth place. The 2003 Winter Universiade Skultan's best tournament; again playing lead for Jarkova, the Russian team won the gold medal defeating Canada's Krista Scharf 11-2 in the final.
