= 2001 World Junior Curling Championships =

- Host city: Ogden, Utah, United States
- Arena: The Ice Sheet at Ogden
- Dates: March 15–25, 2001
- Men's winner: Canada
- Skip: Brad Gushue
- Third: Mark Nichols
- Second: Brent Hamilton
- Lead: Mike Adam
- Alternate: Jamie Korab
- Coach: Jeff Thomas
- Finalist: Denmark (Casper Bossen)
- Women's winner: Canada
- Skip: Suzanne Gaudet
- Third: Stefanie Richard
- Second: Robyn Macphee
- Lead: Kelly Higgins
- Alternate: Carol Webb
- Coach: Paul Power
- Finalist: Sweden (Matilda Mattsson)

The 2001 World Junior Curling Championships were held at The Ice Sheet at Ogden in Ogden, Utah, United States March 15–25.

== Men's ==
| Country | Skip | Wins | Losses |
|---|---|---|---|
| United States | Andy Roza | 7 | 2 |
| Canada | Brad Gushue | 7 | 2 |
| Scotland | David Edwards | 6 | 3 |
| Denmark | Casper Bossen | 6 | 3 |
| Sweden | Eric Carlsén | 5 | 4 |
| Japan | Hiroaki Kashiwagi | 4 | 5 |
| Switzerland | Mark Hauser | 4 | 5 |
| Germany | Christopher Bartsch | 3 | 6 |
| Russia | Alexander Kirikov | 3 | 6 |
| France | Richard Ducroz | 1 | 8 |

=== Tie-breaker ===
- Denmark 9-6 Sweden

=== Playoffs ===
Semi-final
1 | United States | 4
4 | Denmark | 8
2 | Canada | 7
3 | Scotland | 1

Final
4 | Denmark | 6
2 | Canada | 7
Bronze medal
1 | United States | 7
3 | Scotland | 5

== Women's ==
| Country | Skip | Wins | Losses |
|---|---|---|---|
| Canada | Suzanne Gaudet | 7 | 2 |
| Switzerland | Carmen Schäfer | 7 | 2 |
| Sweden | Matilda Mattsson | 6 | 3 |
| Japan | Moe Meguro | 6 | 3 |
| Scotland | Kelly Wood | 5 | 4 |
| Russia | Nina Golovtchenko | 4 | 5 |
| United States | Nicole Joraanstad | 4 | 5 |
| Norway | Linn Githmark | 2 | 7 |
| Denmark | Denise Dupont | 2 | 7 |
| Germany | Daniela Jentsch | 2 | 7 |

=== Playoffs ===
Semi-final
1 | Canada | 11
4 | Japan | 3
2 | Switzerland | 4
3 | Sweden | 9

Final
1 | Canada | 6
3 | Sweden | 4
Bronze medal
4 | Japan | 4
2 | Switzerland | 5

== Sources ==
- Men's results from the World Curling Federation
- Women's results from the World Curling Federation
