= Olga Andrianova (curler) =

Russian female curler and curling coach (1952–2022)

- Curler ♀
- Born: 15 June 1952; Moscow, Russian SFSR, Soviet Union
- Died: 6 September 2022 (aged 70)

Curling career
- Member Association: Russia
Medal record
Russian Women's Championship
Bronze medal – third place	1994

Olga Aleksandrovna Andrianova (Russian: О́льга Алекса́ндровна Андриа́нова; 15 June 1952 – 6 September 2022) was a Russian curler and curling coach.

As a coach of the Russian women's curling team she participated in 2002, 2006, and 2010 Winter Olympics. She was the main coach of Russian national women's curling team from 1998 to 2012.

She was a Master of Sport of Russia and Merited Coach of Russia (Russian: Заслуженный тренер России). From 2006 to 2010 she was a President of Russian Curling Federation. From 2010 to 2022 she was a Secretary General of the Russian Curling Federation.

She graduated from Moscow Institute of Transport Engineers (1975) and Moscow State Academy of Physical Culture (Russian: Московская государственная академия физической культуры, 1983).

== Teams ==
=== Women's ===
Season	Skip	Third	Second	Lead	Events
1993–94	Olga Andrianova	Natalia Petrova	Elena Biktimirova	Liudmila Bazarevich	RWCC 1994 (bronze)

== Record as a coach of national teams ==
Year	Tournament, event	National team	Place
1999	1999 World Junior Curling Championships	Russia (junior women)	10
1999	1999 European Curling Championships	Russia (women)	8
2000	2000 World Junior Curling Championships	Russia (junior women)	7
2000	2000 European Curling Championships	Russia (women)	7
2001	2001 World Junior Curling Championships	Russia (junior women)	6
2001	2001 World Women's Curling Championship	Russia (women)	9
2001	2001 European Curling Championships	Russia (women)	7
2002	2002 Winter Olympics	Russia (women)	10
2002	2002 World Junior Curling Championships	Russia (junior women)	8
2002	2002 World Women's Curling Championship	Russia (women)	7
2003	2003 Winter Universiade	Russia (student women)	1st place, gold medalist(s)
2003	2003 World Junior Curling Championships	Russia (junior women)	9
2003	2003 World Women's Curling Championship	Russia (women)	6
2003	2003 European Curling Championships	Russia (women)	8
2004	2004 World Junior B Curling Championships	Russia (junior women)	2nd place, silver medalist(s)
2004	2004 World Junior Curling Championships	Russia (junior women)	10
2004	2004 European Curling Championships	Russia (women)	4
2005	2005 European Junior Curling Challenge	Russia (junior women)	1st place, gold medalist(s)
2005	2005 European Youth Olympic Winter Festival	Russia (junior women)	6
2005	2005 World Junior Curling Championships	Russia (junior women)	5
2005	2005 World Women's Curling Championship	Russia (women)	5
2005	2005 European Curling Championships	Russia (men)	10
2005	2005 European Curling Championships	Russia (women)	8
2006	2006 Winter Olympics	Russia (women)	5
2006	2006 World Junior Curling Championships	Russia (junior women)	1st place, gold medalist(s)
2006	2006 European Curling Championships	Russia (women)	1st place, gold medalist(s)
2007	2007 European Junior Curling Challenge	Russia (junior men)	9
2007	2007 Winter Universiade	Russia (student women)	2nd place, silver medalist(s)
2007	2007 World Junior Curling Championships	Russia (junior women)	7
2007	2007 World Women's Curling Championship	Russia (women)	8
2007	2007 European Curling Championships	Russia (women)	5
2008	2008 European Junior Curling Challenge	Russia (junior men)	3rd place, bronze medalist(s)
2008	2008 World Junior Curling Championships	Russia (junior women)	4
2008	2008 World Women's Curling Championship	Russia (women)	8
2008	2008 European Curling Championships	Russia (women)	7
2009	2009 Winter Universiade	Russia (student women)	3rd place, bronze medalist(s)
2009	2009 World Junior Curling Championships	Russia (junior women)	4
2009	2009 World Women's Curling Championship	Russia (women)	7
2009	2009 European Curling Championships	Russia (women)	4
2010	2010 Winter Olympics	Russia (women)	9
2010	2010 World Junior Curling Championships	Russia (junior women)	5
2010	2010 World Women's Curling Championship	Russia (women)	8
2010	2010 European Curling Championships	Russia (women)	4
2011	2011 Winter Universiade	Russia (student women)	2nd place, silver medalist(s)
2011	2011 World Junior Curling Championships	Russia (junior women)	3rd place, bronze medalist(s)
2011	2011 World Women's Curling Championship	Russia (women)	6
2011	2011 European Curling Championships	Russia (women)	3rd place, bronze medalist(s)
2012	2012 World Junior Curling Championships	Russia (junior women)	3rd place, bronze medalist(s)
2012	2012 World Women's Curling Championship	Russia (women)	9
2012	2012 European Mixed Curling Championship	Turkey (mixed)	23
2012	2012 European Mixed Curling Championship	Russia (mixed)	14
2012	2012 European Curling Championships (Group C)	Turkey (mixed)	2nd place, silver medalist(s)
2013	2013 European Mixed Curling Championship	Russia (mixed)	21
2016	2016 Winter Youth Olympics (mixed team)	Russia (junior mixed)	4
2016	2016 Winter Youth Olympics (mixed doubles)	Russia Sergei Maksimov / Estonia Kristin Laidsalu	9
2016	2016 Winter Youth Olympics (mixed doubles)	Japan Kosuke Aita / Estonia Nadezhda Karelina	9
2017	2017 European Youth Olympic Winter Festival	Russia (junior men)	1st place, gold medalist(s)
2019	2019 World Junior-B Curling Championships (January)	Russia (junior men)	5
