= Andrey Drozdov =

Russian curler from Zelenograd

- Curler
- Born: 23 February 1988 (age 38); Moscow, Russia

Team
- Curling club: Moskvitch CC, Moscow, RUS
- Skip: Alexander Kirikov
- Third: Andrey Drozdov
- Second: Vadim Shkolnikov
- Lead: Sergei Morozov
- Alternate: Dmitry Abanin

Curling career
- Member Association: Russia
- World Championship: 1 (2013)
- European Championship: 8 (2007, 2008, 2009, 2010, 2011, 2012, 2013, 2015)
- Olympic: 1 (2014)
Medal record
Curling
Representing Russia
Winter Universiade
Silver medal – second place	2015 Granada
European Mixed Championship
Bronze medal – third place	2006 Claut
Russian Men's Curling Cup
Gold medal – first place	2008
Gold medal – first place	2013

Andrey Anatolyevich Drozdov (Russian: Андрей Анатольевич Дроздов; born 23 February 1988) is a Russian curler from Zelenograd. He skips one of the Russian national teams, and is the first Russian men's skip to ever play in the World Championships and first man to skip Russia at the Olympics. He is currently the coach of the Russian women's junior team.

== Career ==
In his youth, Drozdov was a swimmer, but was unsuccessful, so he took up curling at age 15.

Drozdov won his first national championship as a skip in 2009. He has represented Russia in six European Curling Championships. In 2007, he placed 14th playing third for Alexander Kirikov. In 2008, he placed 15th as the skip of the Russian team. In 2009, he placed 12th as the team's skip. Drozdov also skipped the Russian team at the 2009 World Junior Curling Championships, placing 7th. In 2010, he placed 9th as skip. In 2011 he played second for Alexey Tselousov and the team had an 11th-place finish. At the 2012 European Curling Championships, Drozdov lead Russia to their best finish, 5th, qualifying for the World Championships for the first time. Drozdov's lone international medal was a bronze at the 2006 European Mixed Curling Championship. Drozdov played in his first World Curling Championships for Russia at the 2013 Ford World Men's Curling Championship, where he led Russia to a 10th-place finish.

Drozdov was named skip of the Russian team at the 2014 Winter Olympics. He led the host nation to a 7th-place finish, with a 3-6 record.
