= Petr Dron =

Russian curler (born 1985)

Petr Dron Пётр Дрон
- Curler
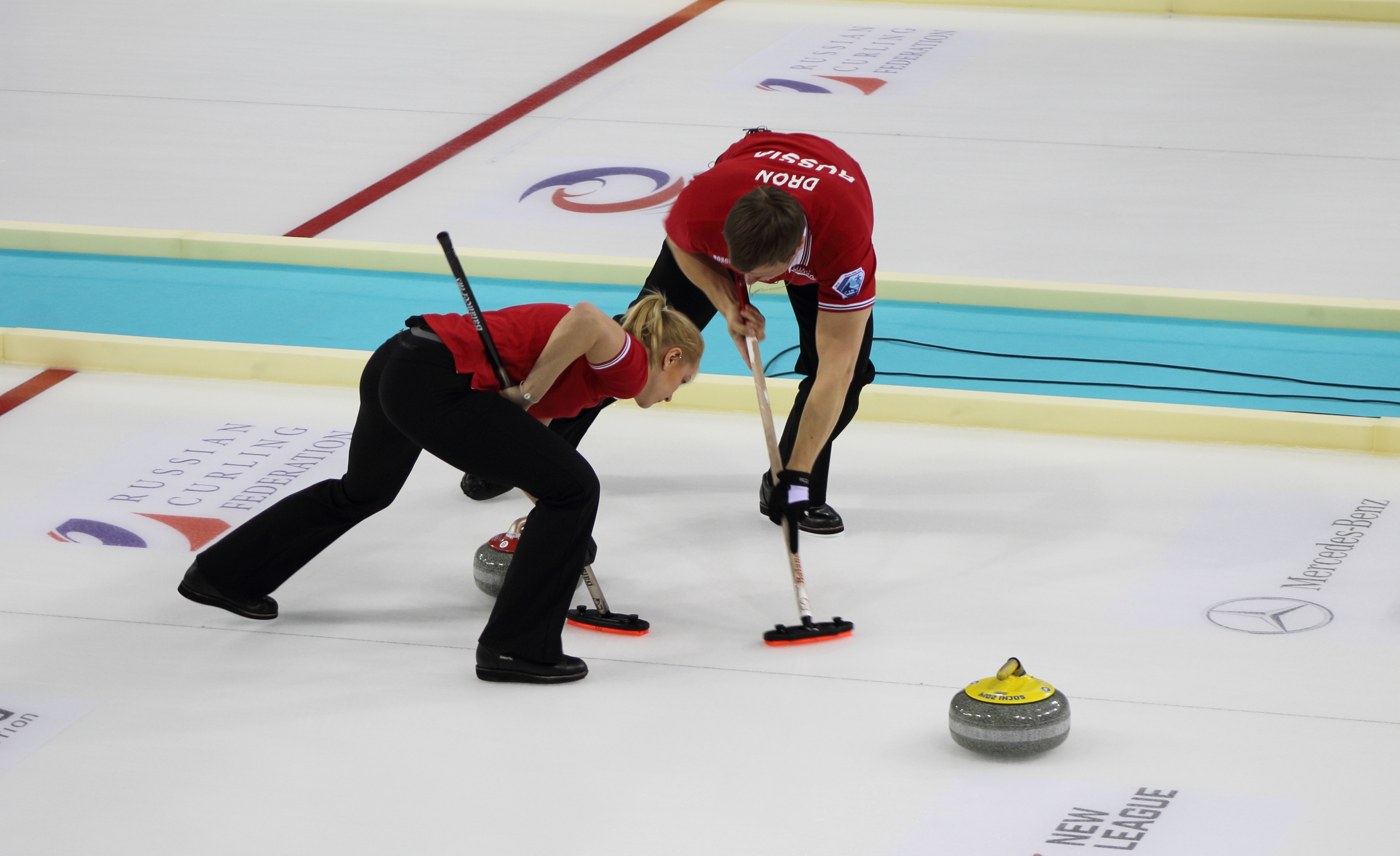
- Born: 28 August 1985 (age 41); Leningrad, USSR

Team
- Curling club: Adamant CC, Saint Petersburg
- Skip: Oleg Krasikov
- Third: Petr Dron
- Second: Sergei Varlamov
- Lead: Danil Kiba
- Alternate: Matvei Vakin

Curling career
- Member Association: Russia
- World Championship: 2 (2013, 2014)
- World Mixed Doubles Championship: 2 (2010, 2015)
- European Championship: 5 (2006, 2007, 2011, 2012, 2013)
- Olympic: 1 (2014)
Medal record
Representing Russia
Mixed doubles curling
World Mixed Doubles Curling Championship
Gold medal – first place	2010 Chelyabinsk

Petr Dmitrievich Dron (Russian: Пётр Дмитриевич Дрон; born 28 August 1985 in Saint Petersburg) is a Russian curler and curling coach. He lives in St. Petersburg. He competed at the 2013 World Curling Championships, and at the 2014 Winter Olympics in Sochi. He currently coaches the Russian men's junior team.

== Career ==
Dron has been playing on curling competitions since 1996. He finished the Lesgaft National State University of Physical Education, Sport and Health. Nationally, Dron won the Federation Cup of Russia (2010–2011), and thrice the Russian Men's Curling Championship (2007, 2011, 2013). He was a member of the Russian team at the 2013 World Men's Curling Championship and at the European Curling Championships in 2012 and 2013. Dron won the 2010 World Mixed Doubles Curling Championship with Yana Nekrasova.

At the 2014 Olympic Games in Sochi, his team automatically qualified and became 7th there. In 2016, Dron and Victoria Moiseeva won the Latvian Mixed Doubles Curling Cup, defeating Spaniards Otaegi / Unanue.
