= Nkeirouka Ezekh =

Russian curler (born 1983)

Nkeirouka Ezekh Нкеирука Езех
- Curler
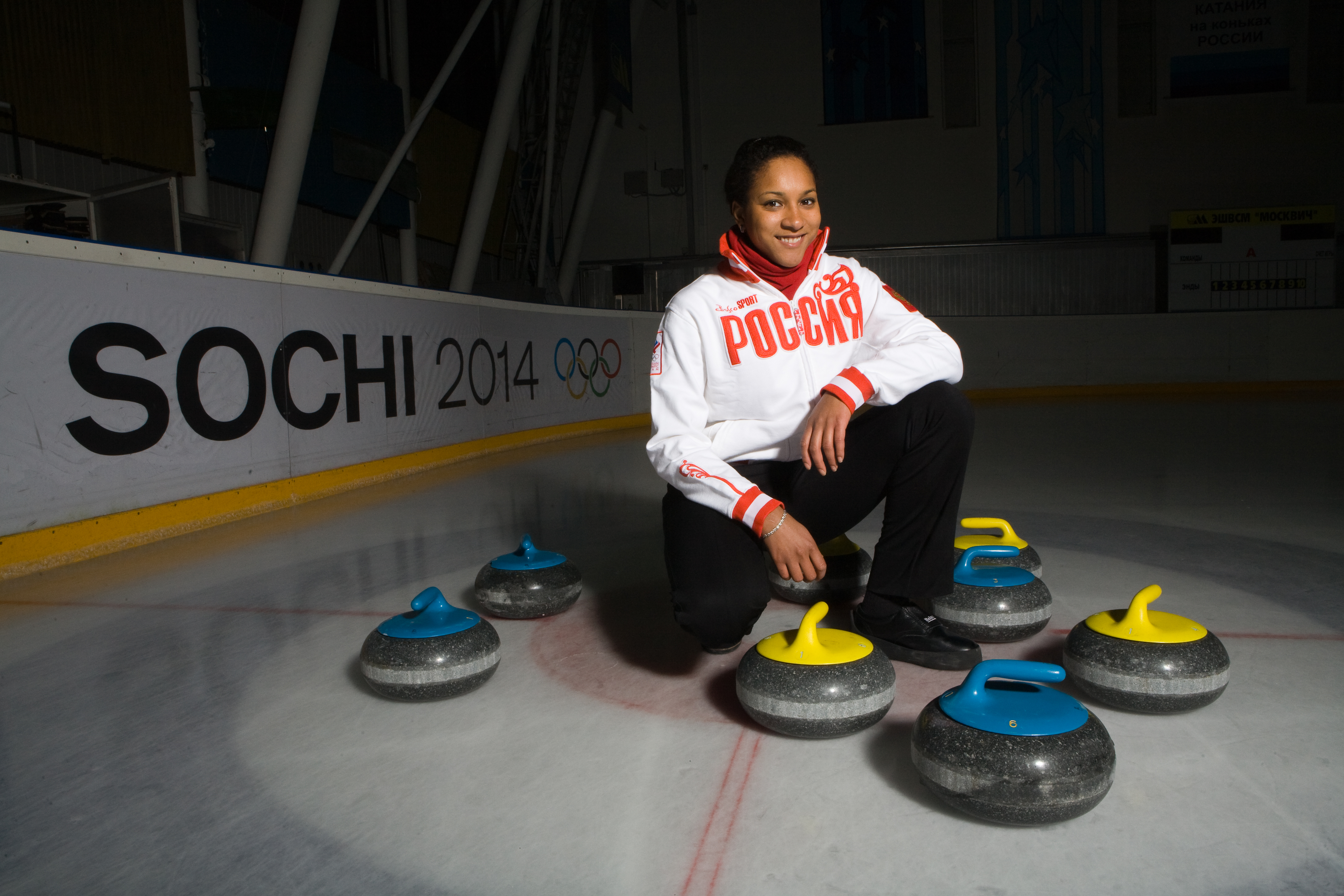
- Ezekh in 2009
- Born: 17 October 1983 (age 43); Moscow, Russian SFSR, Soviet Union

Team
- Curling club: Moskvitch CC, Moscow, RUS
- Skip: Nkeirouka Ezekh
- Third: Diana Margaryan
- Second: Alina Borodulina
- Lead: Anastasia Kilchevskaya
- Alternate: Olga Antonova
- Mixed doubles partner: Alexey Stukalskiy

Curling career
- Member Association: Russia
- World Championship: 15 (2001, 2002, 2003, 2005, 2007, 2008, 2009, 2010, 2011, 2012, 2013, 2014, 2015, 2016, 2017)
- European Championship: 17 (2000, 2001, 2002, 2003, 2004, 2005, 2006, 2007, 2008, 2009, 2010, 2011, 2012, 2013, 2014, 2015, 2017)
- Olympic: 4 (2002, 2006, 2010, 2014)
Medal record
Women's curling
Representing Russia
World Championships
Silver medal – second place	2017 Beijing
Bronze medal – third place	2014 Saint John
Bronze medal – third place	2015 Sapporo
Bronze medal – third place	2016 Swift Current
European Championships
Gold medal – first place	2006 Basel
Gold medal – first place	2012 Karlstad
Gold medal – first place	2015 Esbjerg
Silver medal – second place	2014 Champéry
Bronze medal – third place	2011 Moscow
Winter Universiade
Gold medal – first place	2003 Tarvisio
Silver medal – second place	2007 Torino
Bronze medal – third place	2009 Harbin
European Junior Challenge
Gold medal – first place	2005 Copenhagen

Nkeirouka Khilarievna "Kira" Ezekh (Russian: Нкеирука (Кира) Хилариевна Езех; born 17 October 1983) is a Russian curler. She currently skips her own team out of Saint Petersburg. The team won the 2022 Russian Curling Championships.

She has competed at fifteen World Women's Curling Championships and seventeen European Curling Championships. She won a silver medal at the 2017 World Women's Curling Championship, as well as three bronze medals from 2014 to 2016 as part of the Anna Sidorova rink. She has won the European Championship three times (2006, 2012, 2015) as well as a silver and bronze medal in 2014 and 2011 respectively. Ezekh represented Russia four times at the Winter Olympic Games in 2002 2006, 2010 and 2014, with her best finish coming in 2006 where her team finished in sixth with a 5–4 record.

== Career ==
At the 2006 Winter Olympics, in Turin, Italy, she was part of Ludmila Privivkova's team. A year later her team won the 2006 European Curling Championships. She also represented Russia in the 2010 Vancouver Olympics as second on Privivkova's team.

In 2014, Ezekh served as the alternate on the Anna Sidorova team at the 2014 World Women's Curling Championship, held from 15 to 23 March in Saint John, New Brunswick, Canada. The team finished the round robin with an 8–3 record, earning the third seed in the playoffs. Russia lost to Team Korea in the 3 vs. 4 playoff game, but in a rematch the following day Ezekh and her teammates defeated the Korean team to win the bronze medal. It was the first medal for Russia in the history of the world women's curling championships.

The team then followed up with bronze medals at both the 2015 and 2016 world women's curling championships, and a gold medal at the 2015 European Curling Championships in the meantime. They just narrowly missed playing for gold for the first time at the 2016 Worlds, losing to Japan's Satsuki Fujisawa on the last shot of the semifinal. The team then defeated Canada's Chelsea Carey for their third straight bronze. Team Sidorova made their first World Championship final at the 2017 Worlds, but settled for silver after losing to Canada's Rachel Homan 8–3 in the final.

== Personal life ==
Her father is of Nigerian Igbo descent, and her mother is Chuvash.

== Teammates ==
2014 Sochi Olympic Games

Anna Sidorova, Skip

Margarita Fomina, Third

Alexandra Saitova, Second

Ekaterina Galkina, Lead

2017 World Championship

Anna Sidorova, Skip

Margarita Fomina, Third

Alina Kovaleva, Second

Alexandra Raeva, Alternate
