= Margarita Fomina =

Russian curler

Margarita Fomina Маргарита Фомина
- Curler
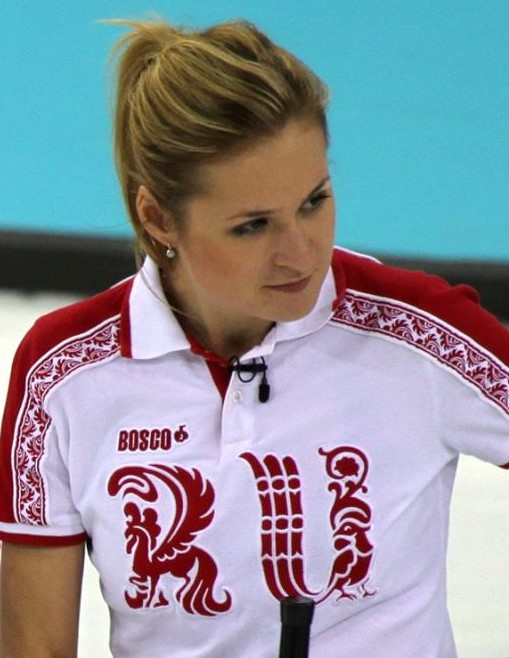
- Born: 19 August 1988 (age 38); Dmitrov, Russian SFSR, Soviet Union

Team
- Curling club: Moskvitch CC, Moscow, RUS

Curling career
- Member Association: Russia
- World Championship: 11 (2007, 2008, 2009, 2010, 2011, 2012, 2013, 2014, 2015, 2016, 2017)
- European Championship: 11 (2005, 2006, 2007, 2008, 2010, 2011, 2012, 2013, 2014, 2015, 2017)
Medal record
Women's curling
Representing Russia
World Championships
Silver medal – second place	2017 Beijing
Bronze medal – third place	2014 Saint John
Bronze medal – third place	2015 Sapporo
Bronze medal – third place	2016 Swift Current
Winter Universiade
Gold medal – first place	2013 Trentino
Gold medal – first place	2015 Granada
Silver medal – second place	2007 Torino
Silver medal – second place	2011 Erzurum
Bronze medal – third place	2009 Harbin
World Junior Championships
Gold medal – first place	2006 Jeonju
European Championships
Gold medal – first place	2006 Basel
Gold medal – first place	2012 Karlstad
Gold medal – first place	2015 Esbjerg
Silver medal – second place	2014 Champéry
Bronze medal – third place	2011 Moscow
European Junior Challenge
Gold medal – first place	2005 Copenhagen

Margarita Mikhailovna Fomina (Russian: Маргари́та Миха́йловна Фомина́; born 19 August 1988 in Dmitrov) is a Russian curler.

She was part of Ludmila Privivkova's team that won the 2006 European Curling Championships.

She received her education at the Moscow Institute of Economics and Humanities.

== Teammates ==
2014 Sochi Olympic Games

Anna Sidorova, Skip

Alexandra Saitova, Second

Ekaterina Galkina, Lead

Nkeirouka Ezekh, Alternate
