= Aleksandr Kozyrev =

Russian curler (born 1986)

Aleksandr Sergeevich Kozyrev (Russian: Александр Сергеевич Козырев; born 26 August 1986) is a Russian curler from Sochi. At the 2014 Winter Olympics in Sochi, Russia, Kozyrev was the alternate for the Aleksey Stukalskiy team representing Russia. He is currently the coach of Team Sergey Glukhov.

== Personal life ==
Kozyrev is currently married. He was born in Moscow.
