= Liudmila Privivkova =

Russian curler

Liudmila Privivkova Людмила Прививкова
- Curler
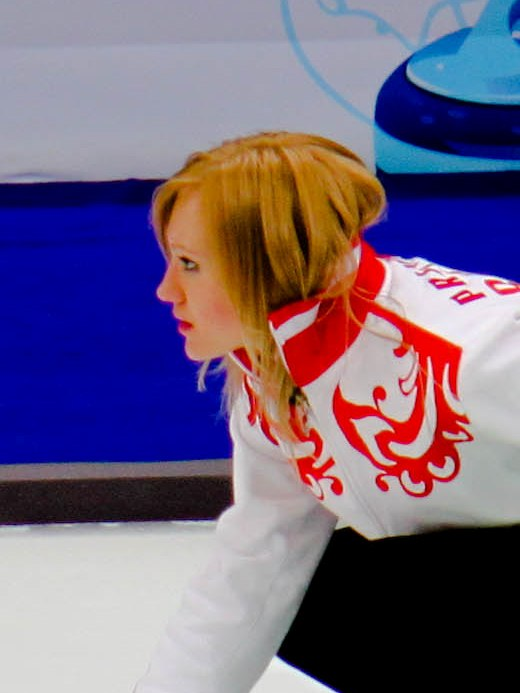
- Born: 13 September 1986 (age 40); Moscow, Soviet Union

Team
- Curling club: Moskvitch CC, Moscow, RUS
- Skip: Anna Sidorova
- Third: Yulia Portunova
- Second: Liudmila Privivkova
- Lead: Maria Ignatenko
- Alternate: Sofia Tkach

Curling career
- Member Association: Russia
- World Championship: 9 (2003, 2005, 2007, 2008, 2009, 2010, 2011, 2012, 2013)
- European Championship: 11 (2002, 2003, 2004, 2005, 2006, 2007, 2008, 2009, 2010, 2011, 2012)
Medal record
Curling
Representing Russia
European Championships
Gold medal – first place	2006	Team
Gold medal – first place	2012	Team
Bronze medal – third place	2011	Team
World Junior Curling Championships
Gold medal – first place	2006	Team
Winter Universiade
Silver medal – second place	2007 Torino
Silver medal – second place	2011 Erzurum
Bronze medal – third place	2009 Harbin
European Junior Challenge
Gold medal – first place	2005 Copenhagen

Liudmila Andreyevna Privivkova (Russian: Людмила Андреевна Прививкова) (born 13 September 1986 in Moscow; also spelled Ludmila or Liudmilla, but she spells it Liudmila) is a curler (Skip) from Russia.

At the 2006 Winter Olympics, in Turin, Italy, she was the skip for the Russian team. Apart from the national team, she plays for the Moskvitch Curling Club, from Moscow. She won the World Junior Curling Championships in Jeonju, Korea on 19 March 2006 and the 2006 European Curling Championships in December the same year.

Her team also qualified for the 2007 World Women's Curling Championship, but did not enjoy the same success as in the European tournament, finishing tied for 8th place with a 4-7 record.

She qualified for her third world championship in 2008.

== Teammates ==
2010 Vancouver Olympic Games

Anna Sidorova, Third

Nkeiruka Ezekh, Second

Ekaterina Galkina, Lead

Margarita Fomina, Alternate

== Grand Slam record ==
Event	2006–07	2007–08	2008–09	2009–10	2010–11
Autumn Gold	Q	SF	Q	Q	Q
Casinos of Winnipeg	DNP	DNP	DNP	DNP	DNP

Key

- C – Champion
- F – Lost final
- SF – Lost semi final
- QF – Lost quarter final
- Q – Did not make playoffs
- DNP – Did not participate in event
- N/A – not a Grand Slam event that season
