= Olga Jarkova =

Russian curler (born 1979)

Olga Nikolayevna Jarkova Ольга Николаевна Жаркова
- Curler ♀
- Born: 11 January 1979 (age 47); Moscow, USSR

Curling career
- World Championship: 7 (2001, 2002, 2003, 2005, 2007, 2008, 2009)
- World Mixed Doubles Championship: 1 (2009)
- European Championship: 11 (1999-2009)
- Olympic: 2 (2002, 2006)
Medal record
Curling
Representing Russia
Winter Universiade
Gold medal – first place	2003	Team
European Championships
Gold medal – first place	2006	Team
World Junior Curling Challenge
Silver medal – second place	1999	Team

Olga Nikolayevna Jarkova (Russian: Óльга Никола́евна Жарко́ва; born 11 January 1979 in Moscow, USSR) is a Russian curler. She has represented Russia twice at the Winter Olympics, in 2002 and 2006.

== Career ==
Jarkova has been curling for Russia internationally since 1999, when she threw fourth stones for Nina Golovtchenko at the World Junior Challenge where they won silver. She threw third stones that year at a disappointing last place finish in the World Junior Curling Championships. After this, she was back to throwing fourth stones. At the 2001 European Curling Championships she became skip of the Russian team. This move eventually paid off, as the team won the gold medal at the 2003 Universiade. They defeated Krista Scharf of Canada in the final. Jarkova remained as the Russian skip until 2005 when she was the team's alternate at the 2005 World Women's Curling Championship. She was the second at the 2005 European Championships and third at the 2006 Winter Olympics. Jarkova has been to two Olympics. She skipped the team in 2002, and placed last and in 2006 Russia placed fifth. She became European Champion in 2006 as part of Ludmila Privivkova's team.
