= 2012 Stockholm Ladies Cup =

- Host city: Stockholm, Sweden
- Arena: Danderyds Curling AB
- Dates: November 1–4
- Winner: (Sweden) Anette Norberg
- Skip: Anette Norberg
- Third: Cecilia Östlund
- Second: Sabina Kraupp
- Lead: Sara Carlsson
- Finalist: (Sweden) Anna Hasselborg

The 2012 Stockholm Ladies Cup was held from November 1 to 4 at the Danderdys Curling AB in Stockholm, Sweden as part of the 2012–13 World Curling Tour. The event was held in a triple knockout format, and the purse for the event was 120,000 SEK, of which the winner, Anette Norberg, received 42,000 SEK. Norberg, a former Stockholm Ladies Cup champion, defeated two-time runner-up Anna Hasselborg in the final, winning with a score of 5–4 in an extra end.

== Teams ==
The teams are listed as follows:

Skip	Third	Second	Lead	Alternate	Locale
Kristine Davanger	Nora Hilding	Ingvild Skaga	Stine Haalien		Norway
Daniela Driendl	Martina Linder	Marika Trettin	Analena Jentsch		Germany
Laura Gualtiero	Sara Levettii	Veronica Zappone	Arianna Losano		Italy
Anna Hasselborg	Karin Rudström	Agnes Knochenhauer	Zandra Flyg		Sweden
Linda Klímová	Kamila Mošová	Pavla Proksiková	Katerina Urbanová	Katerina Samueliová	Czech Republic
Towe Lundman	Amalia Rudström	Elina Backman	Johanna Heldin		Uppsala, Sweden
Maile Mölder	Kristiine Lill	Küllike Ustav	Helen Nummert		Estonia
Anette Norberg	Sabina Kraupp	Cecilia Östlund	Sara Carlsson		Harnosand, Sweden
Sanna Puustinen	Heidi Hossi	Oona Kauste	Marjo Hippi	Anne Malmi	Finland
Evita Regža	Dace Regža	Ieva Bērziņa	Žaklīna Litauniece		Latvia
Maria Prytz (fourth)	Christina Bertrup	Maria Wennerström	Margaretha Sigfridsson (skip)		Umeå, Sweden
Elzbieta Ran	Magdalena Dumanowska	Magda Straczek	Justyna Wojtas	Agata Musik	Poland
Ildikó Szekeres	Alexandra Béres	Ágnes Patonai	Boglárka Ádám		Hungary
Lorna Vevers	Sarah Reid	Alice Spence	Kay Adams		Scotland
Ellen Vogt	Maija Salmiovirta	Tiina Suuripää	Paula Lehtomäki	Laura Kitti	Finland
Olga Zharkova	Julia Portunova	Alisa Tregub	Julia Gusieva		Moscow, Russia

== Knockout results ==
The draw is listed as follows:

=== A event ===
First Knockout		Semifinals		Qualifier 1
(Russia) Olga Zharkova	13
(Finland) Ellen Vogt	3	(Russia) Olga Zharkova	7
(Norway) Kristine Davanger	5	(Czech Republic) Linda Klímová	3
(Czech Republic) Linda Klímová	7			(Russia) Olga Zharkova	6
(Scotland) Lorna Vevers	7			(Sweden) Anette Norberg	5
(Sweden) Towe Lundman	5	(Scotland) Lorna Vevers	5
(Poland) Elzbieta Ran	1	(Sweden) Anette Norberg	7
(Sweden) Anette Norberg	7

First Knockout		Semifinals		Qualifier 2
(Sweden) Margaretha Sigfridsson	11
(Italy) Laura Gualtiero	2	(Sweden) Margaretha Sigfridsson	3
(Finland) Sanna Puustinen	4	(Hungary) Ildikó Szekeres	2
(Hungary) Ildikó Szekeres	11			(Sweden) Margaretha Sigfridsson	6
(Latvia) Evita Regža	3			(Sweden) Anna Hasselborg	3
(Germany) Daniela Driendl	6	(Germany) Daniela Driendl	5
(Sweden) Anna Hasselborg	8	(Sweden) Anna Hasselborg	6
(Estonia) Maile Mölder	3

=== B event ===
Second Knockout		Semifinals		Qualifier 3
(Finland) Ellen Vogt	5
(Norway) Kristine Davanger	7	(Norway) Kristine Davanger	4
(Sweden) Towe Lundman	9	(Sweden) Towe Lundman	9
(Poland) Elzbieta Ran	3			(Sweden) Towe Lundman	2
				(Sweden) Anna Hasselborg	7

Second Knockout		Semifinals		Qualifier 4
(Italy) Laura Gualtiero	6
(Finland) Sanna Puustinen	7	(Finland) Sanna Puustinen	7
(Latvia) Evita Regža	9	(Latvia) Evita Regža	2
(Estonia) Maile Mölder	5			(Finland) Sanna Puustinen	6
				(Sweden) Anette Norberg	7

Second Knockout		Qualifier 5
(Czech Republic) Linda Klímová	2
(Scotland) Lorna Vevers	9	(Scotland) Lorna Vevers	5
(Hungary) Ildikó Szekeres	7	(Hungary) Ildikó Szekeres	7
(Germany) Daniela Driendl	5

=== C event ===
Third Knockout		Semifinals		Qualifier 6
(Finland) Ellen Vogt	5
(Poland) Elzbieta Ran	8	(Poland) Elzbieta Ran	4
		(Germany) Daniela Driendl	7
				(Germany) Daniela Driendl	7
				(Finland) Sanna Puustinen	8

Third Knockout		Semifinals		Qualifier 7
(Italy) Laura Gualtiero	5
(Estonia) Maile Mölder	4	(Italy) Laura Gualtiero	3
		(Czech Republic) Linda Klímová	9
				(Czech Republic) Linda Klímová	4
				(Sweden) Towe Lundman	5

Third Knockout		Qualifier 8
(Norway) Kristine Davanger	4
(Latvia) Evita Regža	3	(Norway) Kristine Davanger	3
		(Scotland) Lorna Vevers	6

== Playoffs ==
The playoffs draw is listed as follows:

Quarterfinals
(Sweden) Margaretha Sigfridsson	7
(Finland) Sanna Puustinen	4
(Sweden) Anette Norberg	8
(Sweden) Towe Lundman	6
(Sweden) Anna Hasselborg	6
(Scotland) Lorna Vevers	5
(Russia) Olga Zharkova	7
(Hungary) Ildikó Szekeres	4

Semifinals
(Sweden) Margaretha Sigfridsson	6
(Sweden) Anette Norberg	7
(Sweden) Anna Hasselborg	6
(Russia) Olga Zharkova	3

Final
(Sweden) Anette Norberg	5
(Sweden) Anna Hasselborg	4

Third place game
1	(Sweden) Margaretha Sigfridsson	6
2	(Russia) Olga Zharkova	5
