= 2013 Women's Masters Basel =

- Host city: Basel, Switzerland
- Arena: Curlingzentrum Region Basel
- Dates: October 11–13
- Winner: (Switzerland) Silvana Tirinzoni
- Curling club: CC Aarau, Aarau
- Skip: Silvana Tirinzoni
- Third: Marlene Albrecht
- Second: Esther Neuenschwander
- Lead: Manuela Siegrist
- Finalist: (Switzerland) Mirjam Ott

The 2013 Women's Masters Basel was held from October 11 to 13 the Curlingzentrum Region Basel in Basel, Switzerland as part of the 2013–14 World Curling Tour. The event was held in a triple-knockout format, and the purse for the event was CHF 32,000, of which the winner, Silvana Tirinzoni, received CHF 10,000. Tirinzoni, last year's runner-up, defeated Mirjam Ott in the final with a score of 7–5.

== Teams ==
The teams are listed as follows:

Skip	Third	Second	Lead	Alternate	Locale
Daniela Driendl	Martina Linder	Marika Trettin	Analena Jentsch		Füssen, Germany
Binia Feltscher	Irene Schori	Franziska Kaufmann	Christine Urech		Flims, Switzerland
Hannah Fleming	Lauren Gray	Jennifer Dodds	Alice Spence		Stirling, Scotland
Vendy Blazkova (fourth)	Fabienne Furbringer (skip)	Sina Wettstein	Nora Baumann	Fabienne Ubersax	Uitikon, Switzerland
Michelle Gribi	Lisa Gisler	Chantal Bugnon	Vera Camponono		Biel, Switzerland
Anna Hasselborg	Karin Rudström	Agnes Knochenhauer	Zandra Flyg		Gävle, Sweden
Ursi Hegner	Nina Ledergerber	Chantal Schmid	Claudia Baumann	Sarah Vogel	Uzwil, Switzerland
Anna Kubešková	Tereza Plíšková	Klára Svatoňová	Veronika Herdová	Martina Strnadová	Prague, Czech Republic
Towe Lundman	Amalia Rudstrom	Elina Backman	Johanna Heldin	Anna Gustafsson	Uppsala, Sweden
Isabelle Maillard	Christelle Moura	Anne Grandjean	Camille Hornisberger	Pauline Jeanneret	Lausanne, Switzerland
Briar Hürlimann (fourth)	Corina Mani (skip)	Rahel Thoma	Tamara Michel		Bern, Switzerland
Jonna McManus	Sara McManus	Anna Huhta	Sofia Mabergs		Gävle, Sweden
Cissi Östlund	Sabina Kraupp	Sara Carlsson	Paulina Stein		Karlstad, Sweden
Oihane Otaegi	Leire Otaegi	Iera Irazusta	Asuncion Manterola		San Sebastián, Spain
Mirjam Ott	Carmen Schäfer	Carmen Küng	Janine Greiner		Davos, Switzerland
Alina Pätz	Nadine Lehmann	Nicole Schwägli	Nicole Dünki		Basel, Switzerland
Andrea Schöpp	Imogen Oona Lehmann	Corinna Scholz	Stella Heiß		Füssen, Germany
Maria Prytz (fourth)	Christina Bertrup	Maria Wennerström	Margaretha Sigfridsson (skip)		Härnösand, Sweden
Ildikó Szekeres	Ágnes Patonai	Blanka Pathy-Dencső	Ágnes Szentannai		Budapest, Hungary
Silvana Tirinzoni	Marlene Albrecht	Esther Neuenschwander	Manuela Siegrist		Aarau, Switzerland
Kai Tsuchiya	Misaki Kobayashi	Kie Igarashi	Mina Uchibori	Erika Otanii	Miyota, Japan
Lorna Vevers	Sarah Reid	Rebecca Kesley	Rachel Hannen		Stirling, Scotland
Veronica Zappone	Sara Levetti	Elisa Patono	Arianna Losano	Martina Bronsinoi	Trentino, Italy
Olga Zharkova	Julia Portunova	Alisa Tregub	Julia Guzieva	Oksana Gertova	Kaliningrad, Russia

== Knockout results ==
The draw is listed as follows:

=== A event ===
First Knockout		Semifinals		Qualifier 1
(Japan) Kai Tsuchiya	8
(Spain) Oihane Otaegi	3	(Japan) Kai Tsuchiya	7
(Switzerland) Mirjam Ott	9	(Switzerland) Mirjam Ott	5
(Italy) Veronica Zappone	3			(Japan) Kai Tsuchiya	1
(Hungary) Ildikó Szekeres	5			(Sweden) Anna Hasselborg	8
(Sweden) Anna Hasselborg	7	(Sweden) Anna Hasselborg	5
(Switzerland) Michelle Gribi	5	(Switzerland) Michelle Gribi	3
(Scotland) Lorna Vevers	4

First Knockout		Semifinals		Qualifier 2
(Sweden) Margaretha Sigfridsson	5
(Switzerland) Ursi Hegner	2	(Sweden) Margaretha Sigfridsson	8
(Scotland) Hannah Fleming	8	(Scotland) Hannah Fleming	3
(Switzerland) Corina Mani	5			(Sweden) Margaretha Sigfridsson	2
(Switzerland) Alina Pätz	6			(Switzerland) Binia Feltscher	5
(Sweden) Towe Lundman	5	(Switzerland) Alina Pätz	2
(Switzerland) Binia Feltscher	7	(Switzerland) Binia Feltscher	7
(Czech Republic) Anna Kubešková	2

First Knockout		Semifinals		Qualifier 3
(Switzerland) Silvana Tirinzoni	7
(Germany) Daniela Driendl	1	(Switzerland) Silvana Tirinzoni	9
(Switzerland) Isabelle Maillard	8	(Switzerland) Isabelle Maillard	3
(Sweden) Cissi Östlund	5			(Switzerland) Silvana Tirinzoni	7
(Germany) Andrea Schöpp	4			(Germany) Andrea Schöpp	6
(Switzerland) Fabienne Furbringer	2	(Germany) Andrea Schöpp	7
(Sweden) Jonna McManus	7	(Sweden) Jonna McManus	5
(Russia) Olga Zharkova	4

=== B event ===
Second Knockout
(Spain) Oihane Otaegi	5
(Italy) Veronica Zappone	11
(Hungary) Ildikó Szekeres	7
(Scotland) Lorna Vevers	4

Quarterfinals
(Germany) Daniela Driendl	7
(Italy) Veronica Zappone	6
(Sweden) Cissi Östlund	5
(Hungary) Ildikó Szekeres	6

Semifinals
(Germany) Daniela Driendl	8
(Switzerland) Alina Pätz	9
(Hungary) Ildikó Szekeres	5
(Sweden) Jonna McManus	6

To Qualifier 4
(Switzerland) Alina Pätz	5
(Sweden) Jonna McManus	4
Qualifier 4
(Switzerland) Alina Pätz	4
(Sweden) Margaretha Sigfridsson	5

Second Knockout		Quarterfinals		Semifinals		To Qualifier 4
				(Switzerland) Michelle Gribi	5
				(Switzerland) Ursi Hegner	6
		(Switzerland) Fabienne Fürbringer	6
(Switzerland) Ursi Hegner	6	(Switzerland) Ursi Hegner	7
(Switzerland) Corina Mani	3					(Switzerland) Ursi Hegner	2
						(Sweden) Margaretha Sigfridsson	8

Second Knockout		To Qualifier 5
(Scotland) Hannah Fleming	7
(Switzerland) Isabelle Maillard	4	(Scotland) Hannah Fleming	4
		(Japan) Kai Tsuchiya	5

Second Knockout
(Sweden) Towe Lundman	4
(Czech Republic) Anna Kubešková	9

Quarterfinals
(Russia) Olga Zharkova	6
(Czech Republic) Anna Kubešková	4

Semifinals
(Switzerland) Mirjam Ott	4
(Russia) Olga Zharkova	3

To Qualifier 5
(Switzerland) Mirjam Ott	8
(Germany) Andrea Schöpp	2
Qualifier 5
(Japan) Kai Tsuchiya	4
(Switzerland) Mirjam Ott	9

=== C event ===
Third Knockout		Semifinals		Qualifier 6
(Germany) Daniela Driendl	3
(Switzerland) Isabelle Maillard	6	(Switzerland) Isabelle Maillard	4
		(Germany) Andrea Schöpp	5
				(Germany) Andrea Schöpp	10
				(Switzerland) Alina Pätz	3

Second Knockout
(Scotland) Lorna Vevers	7
(Switzerland) Corina Mani	1

Quarterfinals
(Scotland) Lorna Vevers	8
(Italy) Veronica Zappone	2

Semifinals
(Scotland) Lorna Vevers	5
(Russia) Olga Zharkova	3

To Qualifier 7
(Scotland) Lorna Vevers	6
(Scotland) Hannah Fleming	3
Qualifier 7
(Scotland) Lorna Vevers	5
(Switzerland) Michelle Gribi	6

Second Knockout		Quarterfinals		Semifinals		To Qualifier 7
				(Switzerland) Michelle Gribi	5
(Spain) Oihane Otaegi	1			(Sweden) Towe Lundman	3
(Sweden) Towe Lundman	8	(Sweden) Towe Lundman	7
		(Sweden) Cissi Östlund	5
						(Switzerland) Michelle Gribi	3
						(Sweden) Jonna McManus	2

Third Knockout
(Switzerland) Fabienne Fürbringer	3
(Czech Republic) Anna Kubešková	7

Quarterfinals
(Hungary) Ildikó Szekeres	9
(Czech Republic) Anna Kubešková	4

Semifinals
(Hungary) Ildikó Szekeres	3
(Switzerland) Ursi Hegner	6

Qualifier 8
(Switzerland) Ursi Hegner	2
(Japan) Kai Tsuchiya	8

== Playoffs ==
Quarterfinals
(Sweden) Anna Hasselborg	6
(Japan) Kai Tsuchiya	4
(Switzerland) Silvana Tirinzoni	3
(Germany) Andrea Schöpp	2
(Sweden) Margaretha Sigfridsson	4
(Switzerland) Mirjam Ott	6
(Switzerland) Binia Feltscher	5
(Switzerland) Michelle Gribi	2

Semifinals
(Sweden) Anna Hasselborg	5
(Switzerland) Silvana Tirinzoni	6
(Switzerland) Mirjam Ott	4
(Switzerland) Binia Feltscher	2

Final
(Switzerland) Silvana Tirinzoni	7
(Switzerland) Mirjam Ott	5
