= 2010 Stockholm Ladies Cup =

- Host city: Stockholm, Sweden
- Arena: Danderyds Curling AB
- Dates: November 4–7
- Winner: (Switzerland) Mirjam Ott
- Curling club: Davos CC, Davos
- Skip: Mirjam Ott
- Third: Carmen Schäfer
- Second: Carmen Küng
- Lead: Janine Greiner
- Finalist: (Sweden) Anna Hasselborg

The 2010 Stockholm Ladies Cup was held from November 4 to 7 at the Danderyds Curling AB in Stockholm, Sweden as part of the 2010–11 World Curling Tour. The event was held in a triple-knockout format, and the playoffs were held in a modified double-knockout format. The purse for the event was 30,000 SEK, with the winner, Mirjam Ott, receiving 10,000 SEK.

== Teams ==
Skip	Third	Second	Lead	Locale
Nicole Dünki	Alina Pätz	Gioia Öschle	Fabiola Duss	Switzerland
Binia Feltscher	Marlene Albrecht	Christine Urech	Sandra Ramstein	Davos, Switzerland
Linn Githmark	Henriette Løvar	Ingrid Stensrud	Kristine Davanger	Oslo, Norway
Anna Hasselborg	Sabina Kraupp	Agnes Knochenhauer	Zandra Flyg	Sundbyberg, Sweden
Michèle Jäggi	Marisa Winkelhausen	Stéphanie Jäggi	Nicole Schwägli	Switzerland
Frida Jonasson	Malin Ekholm	Rosalie Egli	Moa Soderberg	Härnösand, Sweden
Jonna McManus	Sara McManus	Anna Huhta	Sofia Mabergs	Sweden
Mirjam Ott	Carmen Schäfer	Carmen Küng	Janine Greiner	Davos, Switzerland
Liudmila Privivkova	Nkeiruka Ezekh	Margarita Fomina	Ekaterina Galkina	Moscow, Russia
Saana Puustinen	Heidi Hossi	Tiina Köhli	Eszter Juhász	Finland
Evita Regza	Dace Regza	Vineta Smilga	Dace Pastare	Latvia
Karin Rudström	Elina Backman	Amalia Rudström	Towe Lundman	Sweden
Aleksandra Saitova	Nadezhda Lepezina	Victoria Makarshina	Anna Lobova	Moscow, Russia
Anna Sidorova	Olga Zyablikova	Ekaterina Antonova	Galina Arsenkina	Moscow, Russia
Kristin Skaslien	Anneline Skårsmoen	Kjersti Husby	Eli Moen Skaslien	Oslo, Norway
Ildikó Szekeres	Alexandra Béres	Gyöngyi Nagy	Boglarka Ádám	Hungary

== Knockout results ==
=== A event ===
First Knockout
(Russia) Liudmila Privivkova	6
(Finland) Saana Puustinen	5
(Switzerland) Binia Feltscher	9
(Norway) Linn Githmark	2
(Sweden) Karin Rudström	3
(Hungary) Ildikó Szekeres	5
(Sweden) Jonna McManus	2
(Switzerland) Mirjam Ott	7

Semifinals
(Russia) Liudmila Privivkova	3
(Switzerland) Binia Feltscher	6
(Hungary) Ildikó Szekeres	3
(Switzerland) Mirjam Ott	5

Qualifier 1
(Switzerland) Binia Feltscher	5
(Switzerland) Mirjam Ott	8

First Knockout
(Sweden) Anna Hasselborg	6
(Russia) Aleksandra Saitova	5
(Switzerland) Nicole Dünki	11
(Latvia) Evita Regza	2
(Russia) Anna Sidorova	4
(Norway) Kristin Skaslien	2
(Sweden) Frida Jonasson	9
(Switzerland) Michèle Jäggi	5

Semifinals
(Sweden) Anna Hasselborg	8
(Switzerland) Nicole Dünki	6
(Russia) Anna Sidorova	8
(Sweden) Frida Jonasson	5

Qualifier 2
(Sweden) Anna Hasselborg	6
(Russia) Anna Sidorova	1

=== B event ===
Second Knockout		Semifinals		Qualifier 3
(Finland) Saana Puustinen	4
(Norway) Linn Githmark	8	(Norway) Linn Githmark	4
(Sweden) Karin Rudström	6	(Sweden) Karin Rudström	7
(Sweden) Jonna McManus	3			(Sweden) Karin Rudström	4
				(Russia) Anna Sidorova	6

Second Knockout		Semifinals		Qualifier 4
(Russia) Aleksandra Saitova	6
(Latvia) Evita Regza	5	(Russia) Aleksandra Saitova	7
(Norway) Kristin Skaslien	6	(Switzerland) Michèle Jäggi	8
(Switzerland) Michèle Jäggi	7			(Switzerland) Binia Feltscher	7
				(Switzerland) Michèle Jäggi	4

Second Knockout
1	(Russia) Liudmila Privivkova	9
4	(Hungary) Ildikó Szekeres	10
3	(Switzerland) Nicole Dünki	5
2	(Sweden) Frida Jonasson	7

Qualifier 5
(Hungary) Ildikó Szekeres	5
(Sweden) Frida Jonasson	6

=== C event ===
Third Knockout		Semifinals		Qualifier 6
(Finland) Saana Puustinen	8
(Sweden) Jonna McManus	4	(Finland) Saana Puustinen	4
		(Switzerland) Nicole Dünki	3
				(Finland) Saana Puustinen	5
				(Switzerland) Michèle Jäggi	7

Third Knockout		Semifinals		Qualifier 7
(Latvia) Evita Regza	3
(Norway) Kristin Skaslien	11	(Norway) Kristin Skaslien	3
		(Russia) Liudmila Privivkova	7
				(Russia) Liudmila Privivkova	5
				(Sweden) Karin Rudström	4

Third Knockout		Qualifier 8
(Norway) Linn Githmark	2
(Russia) Aleksandra Saitova	5	(Russia) Aleksandra Saitova	5
		(Hungary) Ildikó Szekeres	6

== Playoffs qualifiers ==
=== A qualifiers ===
A Qualifier
1	(Switzerland) Mirjam Ott	4
4	(Russia) Liudmila Privivkova	3
3	(Russia) Anna Sidorova	8
2	(Hungary) Ildikó Szekeres	9

To Playoffs
(Switzerland) Mirjam Ott	5
(Hungary) Ildikó Szekeres	4

A Qualifier
1	(Switzerland) Binia Feltscher	7
4	(Sweden) Frida Jonasson	6
3	(Switzerland) Michèle Jäggi	2
2	(Sweden) Anna Hasselborg	7

To Playoffs
(Switzerland) Binia Feltscher	2
(Sweden) Anna Hasselborg	6

=== B qualifiers ===
B Qualifier		To Playoffs
		(Switzerland) Binia Feltscher	5
(Russia) Liudmila Privivkova	5	(Russia) Liudmila Privivkova	9
(Russia) Anna Sidorova	3

B Qualifier		To Playoffs
		(Hungary) Ildikó Szekeres	3
(Sweden) Frida Jonasson	3	(Switzerland) Michèle Jäggi	7
(Switzerland) Michèle Jäggi	6

== Playoffs ==
Semifinals
1	(Switzerland) Mirjam Ott	10
4	(Switzerland) Michèle Jäggi	3
3	(Russia) Liudmila Privivkova	5
2	(Sweden) Anna Hasselborg	7

Final
(Switzerland) Mirjam Ott	6
(Sweden) Anna Hasselborg	5

Third place
1	(Switzerland) Michèle Jäggi	4
2	(Russia) Liudmila Privivkova	6
