= 2014 Stockholm Ladies Cup =

2014 Stockholm Ladies Curling Cup
- Host city: Stockholm, Sweden
- Arena: Danderyd Curling Arena
- Dates: September 26–28
- Winner: (Sweden) Margaretha Sigfridsson
- Curling club: Skellefteå CK, Skellefteå, Sweden
- Skip: Margaretha Sigfridsson
- Fourth: Maria Prytz
- Third: Christina Bertrup
- Second: Maria Wennerström
- Finalist: (Canada) Rachel Homan

The 2014 Stockholm Ladies Curling Cup was held from September 26 to 28 at the Danderyd Curling Arena in Stockholm, Sweden as part of the 2014–15 World Curling Tour. The event was held in a round robin format, and the purse for the event was 250,000 SEK, of which the winner will receive 100,000 SEK.

The Margaretha Sigfridsson rink from Skellefteå won their first Stockholm Ladies Curling Cup, defeating Canada's Rachel Homan rink in the final, 6-3, after the Homan rink conceded after 7 ends. The defending Olympic champion Jennifer Jones rink, also from Canada, finished third.

== Teams ==
The teams are listed as follows:

Skip	Third	Second	Lead	Alternate	Locale
Melanie Barbezat	Carole Howald	Jenny Perret	Daniela Rupp		Biel, Switzerland
Binia Feltscher	Irene Schori	Franziska Kaufmann	Christine Urech		Flims, Switzerland
Satsuki Fujisawa	Emi Shimizu	Chiaki Matsumura	Ikue Kitazawa	Hasumi Ishigooka	Nagano, Japan
Fabienne Fürbringer	Nora Baumann	Sina Wettstein	Vendy Zgraggen		Uitikon, Switzerland
Lauren Gray	Jennifer Dodds	Vicky Wright	Mhairi Baird		Stirling, Scotland
Anna Hasselborg	Karin Rudström	Agnes Knochenhauer	Zandra Flyg		Gävle, Sweden
Rachel Homan	Emma Miskew	Joanne Courtney	Lisa Weagle		Ottawa, Ontario
Michèle Jäggi	Michelle Gribi	Stéphanie Jäggi	Vera Camponovo		Bern, Switzerland
Jennifer Jones	Kaitlyn Lawes	Jill Officer	Dawn McEwen		Winnipeg, Manitoba
Kim Eun-jung	Kim Kyeong-ae	Kim Seon-yeong	Kim Yeong-mi	Kim Min-jung	(South Korea) Uiseong, Korea
Sara McManus	Jonna McManus	Anna Huhta	Sofia Mabergs		Gävle, Sweden
Sherry Middaugh	Jo-Ann Rizzo	Lee Merklinger	Leigh Armstrong		Coldwater, Ontario
Eve Muirhead	Anna Sloan	Vicki Adams	Sarah Reid		Stirling, Scotland
Imogen Oona Lehmann	Corinna Scholz	Nicole Muskatewitz	Stella Heiß		Füssen, Germany
Cissi Östlund	Sabina Kraupp	Sara Carlsson	Paulina Stein		Karlstad, Sweden
Alina Pätz	Nadine Lehmann	Marisa Winkelhausen	Nicole Schwägli		Baden, Switzerland
Anna Sidorova	Margarita Fomina	Alexandra Saitova	Ekaterina Galkina		Moscow, Russia
Maria Prytz (fourth)	Christina Bertrup	Maria Wennerström	Margaretha Sigfridsson (lead)		Skellefteå, Sweden
Silvana Tirinzoni	Manuela Siegrist	Esther Neuenschwander	Marlene Albrecht		Aarau, Switzerland
Isabella Wranå	Jennie Wåhlin	Elin Lövstrand	Fanny Sjöberg		Sundbyberg, Sweden

== Round-robin standings ==
Pool A	W	L
(Russia) Anna Sidorova	3	1
(Canada) Jennifer Jones	2	2
(Switzerland) Alina Pätz	2	2
(Switzerland) Fabienne Furbringer	2	2
(Sweden) Isabella Wranå	1	3

Pool B	W	L
(South Korea) Kim Eun-jung	3	1
(Canada) Rachel Homan	3	1
(Japan) Satsuki Fujisawa	2	2
(Sweden) Cissi Östlund	2	2
(Switzerland) Binia Feltscher	0	4

Pool C	W	L
(Sweden) Anna Hasselborg	3	1
(Canada) Sherry Middaugh	2	2
(Switzerland) Michèle Jäggi	2	2
(Scotland) Eve Muirhead	2	2
(Sweden) Jonna McManus	1	3

Pool D	W	L
(Sweden) Margaretha Sigfridsson	4	0
(Switzerland) Silvana Tirinzoni	3	1
(Switzerland) Melanie Barbezat	1	3
(Scotland) Lauren Gray	1	3
(Germany) Imogen Oona Lehmann	1	3

== Playoffs ==
Quarterfinals
(Russia) Anna Sidorova	5
(Canada) Rachel Homan	6
(Sweden) Anna Hasselborg	5
(Switzerland) Silvana Tirinzoni	6
(Sweden) Margaretha Sigfridsson	8
(Canada) Sherry Middaugh	3
(South Korea) Kim Eun-jung	4
(Canada) Jennifer Jones	5

Semifinals
(Canada) Rachel Homan	6
(Switzerland) Silvana Tirinzoni	4
(Sweden) Margaretha Sigfridsson	9
(Canada) Jennifer Jones	3

Final
(Canada) Rachel Homan	3
(Sweden) Margaretha Sigfridsson	6
Third place
(Switzerland) Silvana Tirinzoni	3
(Canada) Jennifer Jones	7
