= 2011 Stockholm Ladies Cup =

- Host city: Stockholm, Sweden
- Arena: Danderyds Curling AB
- Dates: November 3–6
- Winner: (Russia) Liudmila Privivkova
- Curling club: Moskvitch CC, Moscow
- Skip: Liudmila Privivkova
- Third: Anna Sidorova
- Second: Nkeiruka Ezekh
- Lead: Ekaterina Galkina
- Finalist: (Sweden) Anna Hasselborg

The 2011 Stockholm Ladies Cup was held from November 3 to 6 at the Danderyds Curling AB in Stockholm, Sweden as part of the 2011–12 World Curling Tour. The event was held in a triple-knockout format, and the playoffs were held in a modified double-knockout format. The purse for the event was 80,000 SEK, with the winner, Liudmila Privivkova, receiving 25,000 SEK.

== Teams ==
Skip	Third	Second	Lead	Locale
Corrine Bourquin	Fabienne Fürbringer	Daniela Rupp	Andrea Friedli	Uitikon, Switzerland
Daniela Driendl	Martina Linder	Marika Trettin	Gesa Angrick	Füssen, Germany
Nathalie Falt	Maria Carlsen	Cassandra Falt	Josefin Wanglund	Sundsvall, Sweden
Anna Hasselborg	Sabina Kraupp	Margaretha Dryburgh	Zandra Flyg	Sundbyberg, Sweden
Ditte Karlsson	Mikaela Tornkvist	Frida Lideberg	Helena Svensson	Sweden
Sanna Puustinen (Fourth)	Heidi Hossi	Eszter Juhász	Oona Kauste (Skip)	Finland
Linda Klímová	Lenka Černovská	Kamila Mošová	Katerina Urbanová	Czech Republic
Victoria Makarshina	Anna Lobova	Oksana Gertova	Nadezhda Lepezina	Russia
Leandra Müller	Claudia Zbinden	Rebekka Engel	Flurine Kobler	Lucerne, Switzerland
Lene Nielsen	Helle Simonsen	Jeanne Ellegaard	Maria Poulsen	Denmark
Anette Norberg	Cecilia Östlund	Sara Carlsson	Liselotta Lennartsson	Harnosand, Sweden
Liudmila Privivkova	Anna Sidorova	Nkeirouka Ezekh	Ekaterina Galkina	Moscow, Russia
Paulina Stein	Towe Lundman	Elina Backman	Amalia Rudstrom	Uppsala, Sweden
Ildikó Szekeres	Alexandra Béres	Boglárka Ádám	Blanka Pathy-Dencsö	Hungary
Ellen Vogt	Riikka Louhivuori	Tiina Suuripää	Maija Salmiovirta	Finland
Olga Zyablikova	Ekaterina Antonova	Victoria Moiseeva	Galina Arsenkina	Moscow, Russia

== Knockout results ==
=== A event ===
First Knockout
(Russia) Olga Zyablikova	3
(Czech Republic) Linda Klímová	4
(Denmark) Lene Nielsen	7
(Sweden) Nathalie Falt	5
(Switzerland) Corrine Bourquin	7
(Finland) Ellen Vogt	3
(Russia) Victoria Makarshina	6
(Sweden) Anette Norberg	7

Semifinals
(Czech Republic) Linda Klímová	5
(Denmark) Lene Nielsen	6
(Switzerland) Corrine Bourquin	2
(Sweden) Anette Norberg	7

Qualifier 1
(Denmark) Lene Nielsen	2
(Sweden) Anette Norberg	7

First Knockout
(Russia) Liudmila Privivkova	4
(Germany) Daniela Driendl	3
(Sweden) Paulina Stein	7
(Hungary) Ildikó Szekeres	3
(Switzerland) Leandra Müller	5
(Sweden) Ditte Karlsson	4
(Finland) Oona Kauste	5
(Sweden) Anna Hasselborg	9

Semifinals
(Russia) Liudmila Privivkova	7
(Sweden) Paulina Stein	1
(Switzerland) Leandra Müller	4
(Sweden) Anna Hasselborg	5

Qualifier 2
(Russia) Liudmila Privivkova	2
(Sweden) Anna Hasselborg	4

=== B event ===
Second Knockout		Semifinals		Qualifier 3
(Russia) Olga Zyablikova	8
(Sweden) Nathalie Falt	2	(Russia) Olga Zyablikova	6
(Finland) Ellen Vogt	1	(Russia) Victoria Makarshina	2
(Russia) Victoria Makarshina	11			(Russia) Olga Zyablikova	7
				(Russia) Liudmila Privivkova	5

Second Knockout		Semifinals		Qualifier 4
(Germany) Daniela Driendl	9
(Hungary) Ildikó Szekeres	5	(Germany) Daniela Driendl	5
(Sweden) Ditte Karlsson	8	(Finland) Oona Kauste	4
(Finland) Oona Kauste	10			(Germany) Daniela Driendl	3
				(Denmark) Lene Nielsen	6

Second Knockout
1	(Czech Republic) Linda Klímová	8
4	(Switzerland) Corrine Bourquin	3
3	(Sweden) Paulina Stein	6
2	(Switzerland) Leandra Müller	4

Qualifier 5
(Czech Republic) Linda Klímová	6
(Sweden) Paulina Stein	2

=== C event ===
Third Knockout		Semifinals		Qualifier 6
(Sweden) Nathalie Falt	4
(Finland) Ellen Vogt	7	(Finland) Ellen Vogt	7
		(Switzerland) Leandra Müller	5
				(Finland) Ellen Vogt	9
				(Germany) Daniela Driendl	3

Third Knockout		Semifinals		Qualifier 7
(Hungary) Ildikó Szekeres	7
(Sweden) Ditte Karlsson	4	(Hungary) Ildikó Szekeres	3
		(Switzerland) Corrine Bourquin	6
				(Switzerland) Corrine Bourquin	3
				(Russia) Liudmila Privivkova	6

Third Knockout		Qualifier 8
(Russia) Victoria Makarshina	4
(Finland) Oona Kauste	5	(Finland) Oona Kauste	1
		(Sweden) Paulina Stein	7

== Playoffs qualifiers ==
=== A qualifiers ===
A Qualifier
1	(Russia) Olga Zyablikova	6
4	(Denmark) Lene Nielsen	3
3	(Sweden) Anna Hasselborg	7
2	(Sweden) Paulina Stein	3

To Playoffs
(Russia) Olga Zyablikova	3
(Sweden) Anna Hasselborg	4

A Qualifier
1	(Czech Republic) Linda Klímová	2
4	(Russia) Liudmila Privivkova	8
3	(Sweden) Anette Norberg	9
2	(Finland) Ellen Vogt	3

To Playoffs
(Russia) Liudmila Privivkova	8
(Sweden) Anette Norberg	4

=== B qualifiers ===
B Qualifier		To Playoffs
		(Sweden) Anette Norberg	5
(Denmark) Lene Nielsen	7	(Sweden) Paulina Stein	2
(Sweden) Paulina Stein	8

B Qualifier		To Playoffs
		(Russia) Olga Zyablikova	5
(Czech Republic) Linda Klímová	3	(Finland) Ellen Vogt	6
(Finland) Ellen Vogt	9

== Playoffs ==
Semifinals
1	(Sweden) Anna Hasselborg	6
4	(Sweden) Anette Norberg	4
3	(Russia) Liudmila Privivkova	8
2	(Finland) Ellen Vogt	1

Final
(Sweden) Anna Hasselborg	4
(Russia) Liudmila Privivkova	5

Third place
1	(Sweden) Anette Norberg	5
2	(Finland) Ellen Vogt	4
