= 2026 Autumn Gold Curling Classic =

- Host city: Okotoks, Alberta
- Arena: Okotoks Curling Club
- Dates: October 8–11
- Winner: (Alberta) Team Sturmay
- Curling club: Saville Community SC, Edmonton
- Skip: Selena Sturmay
- Third: Danielle Schmiemann
- Second: Dezaray Hawes
- Lead: Paige Papley
- Coach: Ted Appelman
- Finalist: (South Korea) Gim Eun-ji

The 2026 Autumn Gold Curling Classic was held from October 8 to 11 at the Okotoks Curling Club in Okotoks, Alberta. The event was held in a triple-knockout format with a purse of $45,000.

For the 2026–27 season, the event was a satellite Grand Slam of Curling event. The highest ranking non-qualified team earned a spot at the 2026 GSOC Masters, the second Grand Slam of the season. As the winner of the event, Team Selena Sturmay of Alberta qualified for the slam.

In the final, Team Sturmay ended Team Gim Eun-ji's reign as Autumn Gold champions dating back to 2022. The Korean rink won the previous four editions of the event. It was Team Sturmay's first Autumn Gold title.

== Teams ==
The teams are listed as follows:

Skip	Third	Second	Lead	Alternate	Locale
Skylar Ackerman	Robyn Silvernagle	Rachel Big Eagle	Mary Little		Saskatoon, Saskatchewan
Sarah Daniels	Abby Ackland	Calissa Daly	Dayna Demmans		New Westminster, British Columbia
Kerri Einarson	Shannon Birchard	Karlee Burgess	Jocelyn Peterman		Gimli, Manitoba
Kim Min-ji (Fourth)	Gim Eun-ji (Skip)	Kim Su-ji	Seol Ye-eun	Seol Ye-ji	Uijeongbu, South Korea
Anna Hasselborg	Sara McManus	Agnes Knochenhauer	Sofia Scharback		Sundbyberg, Sweden
Corrie Hürlimann	Marina Lörtscher	Celine Schwizgebel	Isabel Einspieler		Zug, Switzerland
Danielle Inglis	Jo-Ann Rizzo	Geri-Lynn Ramsay	Joanne Tarvit		Whitby, Ontario
Kim Kyeong-ae (Note: Kim Kyeong-ae skipped Team Kang as Kang Bo-bae was training with the mixed doubles national team. Kim Min-seo moved from alternate to third.)	Kim Min-seo	Shim Yu-jeong	Kim Ji-soo		Jeonbuk, South Korea
Kim Ji-yoon	Lee Eun-chae	Lee Hae-in	Yang Seung-hee		Seoul, South Korea
Ikue Kitazawa	Seina Nakajima	Minori Suzuki	Hasumi Ishigooka		Nagano, Japan
Mina Kobayashi	Kaho Onodera	Yuna Kotani	Anna Ohmiya		Sapporo, Japan
Ava Koe	Abby Whitbread	Elizabeth Morgan	Carley Hardie		Calgary, Alberta
Lila Koe	Andie Ingram	Kaycee Johnston	Ella Cardinal		Calgary, Alberta
Grace Lloyd	Evelyn Robert	Michaela Robert	Rachel Steele		Whitby, Ontario
Yuina Miura	Kohane Tsuruga	Rin Suzuki	Aone Nakamura		Sapporo, Japan
Miku Nihira	Momoha Tabata	Sae Yamamoto	Mikoto Nakajima		Sapporo, Japan
Chelsea Carey (Note: Chelsea Carey spared for Selena Njegovan and skipped Team Njegovan.)	Erin Pincott	Margot Flemming	Krysten Karwacki		Winnipeg, Manitoba
Alina Pätz	Selina Witschonke	Stefanie Berset	Renée Frigo		Geneva, Switzerland
Taylor Reese-Hansen	Megan McGillivray	Kim Bonneau	Julianna Mackenzie		Victoria, British Columbia
Gracelyn Richards	Emma Yarmuch	Rachel Jacques	Sophia Ryhorchuk		Edmonton, Alberta
Xenia Schwaller	Selina Gafner	Fabienne Rieder	Selina Rychiger		Zurich, Switzerland
Hillary Selkirk	Joelle Trawick	Sophie Gallant	Chloe McGuirk		Calgary, Alberta
Kayla Skrlik	Myla Plett	Sarah Koltun	Samantha Fisher		Calgary, Alberta
Amanda Sluchinski	Kate Goodhelpsen	Anna Munroe	Amy Wheatcroft		Edmonton, Alberta
Selena Sturmay	Danielle Schmiemann	Dezaray Hawes	Paige Papley		Edmonton, Alberta
Miyu Ueno	Asuka Kanai	Yui Ozeki	Yui Ueno		Karuizawa, Japan
Isabella Wranå	Almida de Val	Moa Dryburgh	Maria Larsson		Sundbyberg, Sweden
Sierra Wyatt	Cassie Walgenbach	Sydney Morihira	Evangeline Dumas	Anteah Chin	Calgary, Alberta

== Knockout Brackets ==
=== A Event ===
First Knockout	Qualifier 1
(South Korea) Gim Eun-ji	5
(Alberta) Kayla Skrlik	2	(South Korea) Team Kang	10
(South Korea) Team Kang	6	(South Korea) Team Kang	3
(Japan) Miyu Ueno	1	(Sweden) Isabella Wranå	5
(Alberta) Amanda Sluchinski	5	(Alberta) Amanda Sluchinski	7
(Sweden) Isabella Wranå	9	(Sweden) Isabella Wranå	9
(Alberta) Ava Koe	1	(Sweden) Isabella Wranå	2
(Japan) Miku Nihira	9	(Japan) Ikue Kitazawa	7
(British Columbia) Sarah Daniels	3	(Japan) Miku Nihira	1
(Japan) Ikue Kitazawa	8	(Japan) Ikue Kitazawa	5
(Alberta) Hillary Selkirk	1	(Japan) Ikue Kitazawa	6
(Switzerland) Corrie Hürlimann	6	(Switzerland) Alina Pätz	2
(Alberta) Gracelyn Richards	4	(Switzerland) Corrie Hürlimann	4
(Switzerland) Alina Pätz	5

First Knockout	Qualifier 2
(Switzerland) Xenia Schwaller	8
(Ontario) Grace Lloyd	4	(Saskatchewan) Skylar Ackerman	2
(Saskatchewan) Skylar Ackerman	5	(Switzerland) Xenia Schwaller	7
(South Korea) Kim Ji-yoon	1	(Japan) Mina Kobayashi	0
(Manitoba) Team Njegovan	7	(Manitoba) Team Njegovan	2
(Japan) Mina Kobayashi	9	(Japan) Mina Kobayashi	4
(Alberta) Lila Koe	2	(Switzerland) Xenia Schwaller	3
(British Columbia) Taylor Reese-Hansen	2	(Manitoba) Kerri Einarson	4
(Japan) Yuina Miura	7	(Japan) Yuina Miura	5
(Sweden) Anna Hasselborg	9	(Sweden) Anna Hasselborg	2
(Alberta) Sierra Wyatt	2	(Japan) Yuina Miura	2
(Alberta) Selena Sturmay	6	(Manitoba) Kerri Einarson	10
(Ontario) Danielle Inglis	4	(Alberta) Selena Sturmay	4
(Manitoba) Kerri Einarson	5

=== B Event ===
Second Knockout	Qualifier 3
(Switzerland) Xenia Schwaller	10
(Manitoba) Team Njegovan	8
(Saskatchewan) Skylar Ackerman	7
(Japan) Miyu Ueno	6	(Japan) Miyu Ueno	9
(Alberta) Ava Koe	4	(Japan) Miyu Ueno	4
(Manitoba) Team Njegovan	8
(Alberta) Kayla Skrlik	3
(Manitoba) Team Njegovan	9
(Switzerland) Xenia Schwaller	3
(Switzerland) Alina Pätz	8
(South Korea) Team Kang	4
(Sweden) Anna Hasselborg	6
(Alberta) Gracelyn Richards	2
(Sweden) Anna Hasselborg	8
(Sweden) Anna Hasselborg	2
(Switzerland) Alina Pätz	6
(Switzerland) Alina Pätz	8
(British Columbia) Sarah Daniels	5	(Alberta) Selena Sturmay	2
(Alberta) Hillary Selkirk	8	(Alberta) Hillary Selkirk	2
(Alberta) Selena Sturmay	7

Second Knockout	Qualifier 4
(Sweden) Isabella Wranå	7
(South Korea) Gim Eun-ji	6
(South Korea) Gim Eun-ji	10
(South Korea) Kim Ji-yoon	6	(South Korea) Kim Ji-yoon	4
(Alberta) Lila Koe	3	(South Korea) Gim Eun-ji	8
(Alberta) Amanda Sluchinski	4
(Ontario) Grace Lloyd	1
(Alberta) Amanda Sluchinski	8
(Sweden) Isabella Wranå	5
(Japan) Mina Kobayashi	1
(Japan) Mina Kobayashi	10
(Japan) Miku Nihira	2
(Ontario) Danielle Inglis	1
(Japan) Miku Nihira	8
(Japan) Mina Kobayashi	6
(Japan) Yuina Miura	5
(Japan) Yuina Miura	7
(British Columbia) Taylor Reese-Hansen	8	(British Columbia) Taylor Reese-Hansen	5
(Alberta) Sierra Wyatt	2	(British Columbia) Taylor Reese-Hansen	10
(Switzerland) Corrie Hürlimann	6

=== C Event ===
Third Knockout	Qualifier 5
(Alberta) Amanda Sluchinski	3
(Alberta) Ava Koe	4	(British Columbia) Sarah Daniels	6
(British Columbia) Sarah Daniels	6	(British Columbia) Sarah Daniels	4
(Japan) Miku Nihira	9
(Japan) Miku Nihira	6
(British Columbia) Taylor Reese-Hansen	3
(Japan) Miku Nihira	2
(Switzerland) Xenia Schwaller	6

Third Knockout				Qualifier 6
		(South Korea) Gim Eun-ji	7
(Saskatchewan) Skylar Ackerman	4	(Alberta) Kayla Skrlik	1
(Alberta) Kayla Skrlik	5			(South Korea) Gim Eun-ji	4
(Alberta) Gracelyn Richards	6			(Japan) Yuina Miura	3
(Alberta) Hillary Selkirk	5	(Alberta) Gracelyn Richards	8
		(Japan) Yuina Miura	10

Third Knockout				Qualifier 7
		(Manitoba) Team Njegovan	5
(South Korea) Kim Ji-yoon	4	(Ontario) Grace Lloyd	2
(Ontario) Grace Lloyd	7			(Manitoba) Team Njegovan	4
(Ontario) Danielle Inglis	2			(Sweden) Anna Hasselborg	5
(Switzerland) Corrie Hürlimann	8	(Switzerland) Corrie Hürlimann	1
		(Sweden) Anna Hasselborg	8

Third Knockout	Qualifier 8
(Japan) Miyu Ueno	8
(Alberta) Lila Koe	4	(Alberta) Sierra Wyatt	0
(Alberta) Sierra Wyatt	5	(Japan) Miyu Ueno	3
(Alberta) Selena Sturmay	8
(South Korea) Team Kang	7
(Alberta) Selena Sturmay	9
(Alberta) Selena Sturmay	8
(Japan) Mina Kobayashi	3

== Knockout Results ==
All draw times listed in Mountain Daylight Time (UTC-06:00).

=== Draw 1 ===
Thursday, October 8, 9:00 am

Sheet 1	1	2	3	4	5	6	7	8	Final
(Japan) Miyu Ueno	0	0	1	0	0	0	0	X	1
(Alberta) Amanda Sluchinski 🔨	0	1	0	0	0	2	2	X	5

Sheet 2	1	2	3	4	5	6	7	8	Final
(Sweden) Isabella Wranå 🔨	1	1	0	2	2	3	X	X	9
(Alberta) Ava Koe	0	0	1	0	0	0	X	X	1

Sheet 3	1	2	3	4	5	6	7	8	Final
(Japan) Miku Nihira 🔨	3	0	0	2	2	0	2	X	9
(British Columbia) Sarah Daniels	0	1	0	0	0	2	0	X	3

Sheet 4	1	2	3	4	5	6	7	8	Final
(Alberta) Kayla Skrlik 🔨	0	0	1	0	0	1	0	X	2
(South Korea) Team Kang	1	1	0	0	2	0	2	X	6

Sheet 5	1	2	3	4	5	6	7	8	Final
(Japan) Ikue Kitazawa 🔨	3	0	1	2	2	X	X	X	8
(Alberta) Hillary Selkirk	0	1	0	0	0	X	X	X	1

Sheet 6	1	2	3	4	5	6	7	8	9	Final
(Switzerland) Corrie Hürlimann	0	1	1	0	0	0	2	0	2	6
(Alberta) Gracelyn Richards 🔨	2	0	0	1	0	0	0	1	0	4

=== Draw 2 ===
Thursday, October 8, 12:45 pm

Sheet 1	1	2	3	4	5	6	7	8	Final
(British Columbia) Taylor Reese-Hansen	0	0	0	1	0	1	X	X	2
(Japan) Yuina Miura 🔨	1	1	1	0	4	0	X	X	7

Sheet 2	1	2	3	4	5	6	7	8	Final
(Sweden) Anna Hasselborg 🔨	3	3	0	3	0	X	X	X	9
(Alberta) Sierra Wyatt	0	0	1	0	1	X	X	X	2

Sheet 3	1	2	3	4	5	6	7	8	Final
(Alberta) Selena Sturmay	1	0	2	1	0	1	0	1	6
(Ontario) Danielle Inglis 🔨	0	1	0	0	1	0	2	0	4

Sheet 4	1	2	3	4	5	6	7	8	Final
(Ontario) Grace Lloyd	0	1	0	0	1	1	0	1	4
(Saskatchewan) Skylar Ackerman 🔨	1	0	2	1	0	0	1	0	5

Sheet 5	1	2	3	4	5	6	7	8	Final
(South Korea) Kim Ji-yoon	0	0	0	1	0	X	X	X	1
(Manitoba) Team Njegovan 🔨	2	2	1	0	2	X	X	X	7

Sheet 6	1	2	3	4	5	6	7	8	Final
(Japan) Mina Kobayashi 🔨	3	4	0	0	2	0	X	X	9
(Alberta) Lila Koe	0	0	1	0	0	1	X	X	2

=== Draw 3 ===
Thursday, October 8, 4:30 pm

Sheet 1	1	2	3	4	5	6	7	8	Final
(Japan) Miku Nihira	0	0	0	0	0	1	X	X	1
(Japan) Ikue Kitazawa 🔨	0	1	1	1	2	0	X	X	5

Sheet 2	1	2	3	4	5	6	7	8	Final
(South Korea) Gim Eun-ji 🔨	1	1	0	0	2	0	1	0	5
(South Korea) Team Kang	0	0	3	1	0	2	0	4	10

Sheet 3	1	2	3	4	5	6	7	8	Final
(Switzerland) Corrie Hürlimann	0	0	0	1	0	1	1	1	4
(Switzerland) Alina Pätz 🔨	0	2	1	0	2	0	0	0	5

Sheet 4	1	2	3	4	5	6	7	8	9	Final
(Alberta) Amanda Sluchinski	0	2	0	2	0	1	0	2	0	7
(Sweden) Isabella Wranå 🔨	2	0	3	0	0	0	2	0	2	9

Sheet 5	1	2	3	4	5	6	7	8	Final
(Japan) Miyu Ueno	0	0	2	0	0	1	0	3	6
(Alberta) Ava Koe 🔨	1	0	0	1	1	0	1	0	4

Sheet 6	1	2	3	4	5	6	7	8	Final
(British Columbia) Sarah Daniels	0	2	0	0	2	0	1	0	5
(Alberta) Hillary Selkirk 🔨	0	0	2	2	0	1	0	3	8

=== Draw 4 ===
Thursday, October 8, 8:15 pm

Sheet 1	1	2	3	4	5	6	7	8	Final
(Alberta) Selena Sturmay 🔨	0	0	2	0	0	0	2	0	4
(Manitoba) Kerri Einarson	0	2	0	1	0	1	0	1	5

Sheet 2	1	2	3	4	5	6	7	8	Final
(Manitoba) Team Njegovan	0	0	0	1	0	1	0	X	2
(Japan) Mina Kobayashi 🔨	0	1	0	0	1	0	2	X	4

Sheet 3	1	2	3	4	5	6	7	8	Final
(Japan) Yuina Miura	1	1	0	1	0	1	1	X	5
(Sweden) Anna Hasselborg 🔨	0	0	1	0	1	0	0	X	2

Sheet 4	1	2	3	4	5	6	7	8	Final
(South Korea) Kim Ji-yoon 🔨	0	3	0	1	2	0	0	X	6
(Alberta) Lila Koe	0	0	1	0	0	1	1	X	3

Sheet 5	1	2	3	4	5	6	7	8	Final
(British Columbia) Taylor Reese-Hansen 🔨	1	2	0	1	0	3	1	X	8
(Alberta) Sierra Wyatt	0	0	1	0	1	0	0	X	2

Sheet 6	1	2	3	4	5	6	7	8	Final
(Switzerland) Xenia Schwaller 🔨	1	1	3	0	0	3	X	X	8
(Saskatchewan) Skylar Ackerman	0	0	0	1	1	0	X	X	2

=== Draw 5 ===
Friday, October 9, 9:00 am

Sheet 1	1	2	3	4	5	6	7	8	Final
(South Korea) Team Kang	0	0	1	0	1	0	1	X	3
(Sweden) Isabella Wranå 🔨	1	1	0	2	0	1	0	X	5

Sheet 2	1	2	3	4	5	6	7	8	Final
(Saskatchewan) Skylar Ackerman 🔨	3	0	1	0	1	0	2	0	7
(Japan) Miyu Ueno	0	2	0	2	0	2	0	3	9

Sheet 3	1	2	3	4	5	6	7	8	Final
(Alberta) Hillary Selkirk 🔨	1	0	1	0	0	0	X	X	2
(Alberta) Selena Sturmay	0	2	0	2	1	2	X	X	7

Sheet 4	1	2	3	4	5	6	7	8	Final
(Japan) Ikue Kitazawa 🔨	2	0	2	1	1	0	X	X	6
(Switzerland) Alina Pätz	0	1	0	0	0	1	X	X	2

Sheet 5	1	2	3	4	5	6	7	8	Final
(Alberta) Gracelyn Richards	0	0	1	0	1	0	0	X	2
(Sweden) Anna Hasselborg 🔨	2	3	0	1	0	1	1	X	8

Sheet 6	1	2	3	4	5	6	7	8	Final
(Alberta) Kayla Skrlik	0	1	0	0	2	0	0	X	3
(Manitoba) Team Njegovan 🔨	1	0	0	2	0	4	2	X	9

=== Draw 6 ===
Friday, October 9, 12:45 pm

Sheet 1	1	2	3	4	5	6	7	8	Final
(Switzerland) Xenia Schwaller	0	1	1	3	2	X	X	X	7
(Japan) Mina Kobayashi 🔨	0	0	0	0	0	X	X	X	0

Sheet 2	1	2	3	4	5	6	7	8	Final
(British Columbia) Taylor Reese-Hansen 🔨	2	0	0	4	1	0	1	2	10
(Switzerland) Corrie Hürlimann	0	3	1	0	0	2	0	0	6

Sheet 3	1	2	3	4	5	6	7	8	Final
(Ontario) Grace Lloyd 🔨	0	1	0	0	0	X	X	X	1
(Alberta) Amanda Sluchinski	4	0	1	1	2	X	X	X	8

Sheet 4	1	2	3	4	5	6	7	8	Final
(Japan) Yuina Miura	0	0	0	2	0	0	0	X	2
(Manitoba) Kerri Einarson 🔨	0	2	1	0	1	2	4	X	10

Sheet 5	1	2	3	4	5	6	7	8	Final
(South Korea) Gim Eun-ji 🔨	3	0	0	3	0	2	2	X	10
(South Korea) Kim Ji-yoon	0	2	1	0	1	0	0	X	4

Sheet 6	1	2	3	4	5	6	7	8	Final
(Ontario) Danielle Inglis 🔨	0	0	0	0	1	0	X	X	1
(Japan) Miku Nihira	1	2	2	2	0	1	X	X	8

=== Draw 7 ===
Friday, October 9, 4:30 pm

Sheet 1	1	2	3	4	5	6	7	8	Final
(Switzerland) Alina Pätz	2	0	3	2	1	X	X	X	8
(Alberta) Selena Sturmay 🔨	0	2	0	0	0	X	X	X	2

Sheet 2	1	2	3	4	5	6	7	8	Final
(South Korea) Gim Eun-ji 🔨	0	2	0	0	3	0	3	X	8
(Alberta) Amanda Sluchinski	0	0	2	0	0	2	0	X	4

Sheet 3	1	2	3	4	5	6	7	8	Final
(Sweden) Isabella Wranå 🔨	1	0	0	0	1	X	X	X	2
(Japan) Ikue Kitazawa	0	1	4	2	0	X	X	X	7

Sheet 4	1	2	3	4	5	6	7	8	Final
(South Korea) Team Kang 🔨	0	1	0	1	1	0	0	1	4
(Sweden) Anna Hasselborg	2	0	2	0	0	1	1	0	6

Sheet 5	1	2	3	4	5	6	7	8	Final
(Japan) Miyu Ueno	0	0	1	0	1	0	2	0	4
(Manitoba) Team Njegovan 🔨	1	1	0	1	0	2	0	3	8

Sheet 6	1	2	3	4	5	6	7	8	9	Final
(Alberta) Lila Koe	0	1	0	0	1	0	0	2	0	4
(Alberta) Sierra Wyatt 🔨	0	0	1	1	0	1	1	0	1	5

=== Draw 8 ===
Friday, October 9, 8:15 pm

Sheet 1	1	2	3	4	5	6	7	8	Final
(Japan) Yuina Miura 🔨	3	0	2	0	1	1	0	X	7
(British Columbia) Taylor Reese-Hansen	0	2	0	1	0	0	2	X	5

Sheet 2	1	2	3	4	5	6	7	8	Final
(Alberta) Ava Koe	0	1	0	1	0	2	0	X	4
(British Columbia) Sarah Daniels 🔨	1	0	2	0	2	0	1	X	6

Sheet 3	1	2	3	4	5	6	7	8	Final
(Switzerland) Xenia Schwaller 🔨	0	1	0	0	1	0	0	1	3
(Manitoba) Kerri Einarson	0	0	2	1	0	1	0	0	4

Sheet 4	1	2	3	4	5	6	7	8	Final
(Japan) Mina Kobayashi 🔨	1	0	1	0	4	4	X	X	10
(Japan) Miku Nihira	0	0	0	2	0	0	X	X	2

Sheet 5	1	2	3	4	5	6	7	8	9	Final
(Saskatchewan) Skylar Ackerman	1	0	1	0	1	0	0	1	0	4
(Alberta) Kayla Skrlik 🔨	0	1	0	1	0	2	0	0	1	5

Sheet 6	1	2	3	4	5	6	7	8	Final
(South Korea) Kim Ji-yoon 🔨	0	0	1	0	2	0	1	X	4
(Ontario) Grace Lloyd	0	2	0	1	0	2	0	2	7

=== Draw 9 ===
Saturday, October 10, 9:00 am

Sheet 1	1	2	3	4	5	6	7	8	9	Final
(Alberta) Gracelyn Richards	0	0	2	0	1	0	0	2	1	6
(Alberta) Hillary Selkirk 🔨	0	0	0	1	0	3	1	0	0	5

Sheet 2	1	2	3	4	5	6	7	8	Final
(Japan) Miyu Ueno	4	1	2	1	X	X	X	X	8
(Alberta) Sierra Wyatt 🔨	0	0	0	0	X	X	X	X	0

Sheet 3	1	2	3	4	5	6	7	8	Final
(Sweden) Anna Hasselborg 🔨	2	0	0	0	0	0	0	X	2
(Switzerland) Alina Pätz	0	2	0	1	1	1	1	X	6

Sheet 4	1	2	3	4	5	6	7	8	9	Final
(Sweden) Isabella Wranå 🔨	0	3	1	0	1	1	0	0	1	7
(South Korea) Gim Eun-ji	0	0	0	2	0	0	3	1	0	6

Sheet 5	1	2	3	4	5	6	7	8	Final
(Ontario) Danielle Inglis	0	0	0	2	0	0	X	X	2
(Switzerland) Corrie Hürlimann 🔨	0	1	2	0	3	2	X	X	8

Sheet 6	1	2	3	4	5	6	7	8	Final
(South Korea) Team Kang 🔨	0	0	4	0	0	2	0	1	7
(Alberta) Selena Sturmay	1	1	0	3	1	0	3	0	9

=== Draw 10 ===
Saturday, October 10, 12:45 pm

Sheet 1	1	2	3	4	5	6	7	8	9	Final
(Switzerland) Xenia Schwaller	0	2	0	2	0	0	3	1	2	10
(Manitoba) Team Njegovan 🔨	3	0	1	0	2	2	0	0	0	8

Sheet 2	1	2	3	4	5	6	7	8	Final
(Japan) Mina Kobayashi	0	0	2	0	1	1	0	2	6
(Japan) Yuina Miura 🔨	0	3	0	1	0	0	1	0	5

Sheet 3	1	2	3	4	5	6	7	8	Final
(South Korea) Gim Eun-ji	2	4	1	0	X	X	X	X	7
(Alberta) Kayla Skrlik 🔨	0	0	0	1	X	X	X	X	1

Sheet 4	1	2	3	4	5	6	7	8	Final
(Japan) Miyu Ueno 🔨	1	0	0	1	0	1	X	X	3
(Alberta) Selena Sturmay	0	4	1	0	3	0	X	X	8

Sheet 5	1	2	3	4	5	6	7	8	Final
(Japan) Miku Nihira	2	1	0	1	0	2	0	X	6
(British Columbia) Taylor Reese-Hansen 🔨	0	0	1	0	1	0	1	X	3

Sheet 6	1	2	3	4	5	6	7	8	Final
(Alberta) Amanda Sluchinski	0	0	1	0	1	0	1	0	3
(British Columbia) Sarah Daniels 🔨	0	0	0	2	0	2	0	2	6

=== Draw 11 ===
Saturday, October 10, 4:30 pm

Sheet 1	1	2	3	4	5	6	7	8	Final
(British Columbia) Sarah Daniels 🔨	0	2	0	0	1	1	0	0	4
(Japan) Miku Nihira	0	0	2	2	0	0	2	3	9

Sheet 2	1	2	3	4	5	6	7	8	Final
(Manitoba) Team Njegovan 🔨	0	0	0	1	0	2	1	1	5
(Ontario) Grace Lloyd	0	0	0	0	2	0	0	0	2

Sheet 3	1	2	3	4	5	6	7	8	Final
(Sweden) Isabella Wranå 🔨	0	1	1	1	0	1	1	X	5
(Japan) Mina Kobayashi	0	0	0	0	1	0	0	X	1

Sheet 4	1	2	3	4	5	6	7	8	Final
(Switzerland) Xenia Schwaller	0	2	0	0	0	1	0	X	3
(Switzerland) Alina Pätz 🔨	2	0	2	0	1	0	3	X	8

Sheet 5	1	2	3	4	5	6	7	8	9	Final
(Alberta) Gracelyn Richards	0	0	2	0	2	0	4	0	0	8
(Japan) Yuina Miura 🔨	0	1	0	1	0	3	0	3	2	10

Sheet 6	1	2	3	4	5	6	7	8	Final
(Switzerland) Corrie Hürlimann	0	0	1	0	0	X	X	X	1
(Sweden) Anna Hasselborg 🔨	0	3	0	2	3	X	X	X	8

=== Draw 12 ===
Saturday, October 10, 8:15 pm

Sheet 1	1	2	3	4	5	6	7	8	Final
(Alberta) Selena Sturmay 🔨	1	0	2	0	4	1	X	X	8
(Japan) Mina Kobayashi	0	2	0	1	0	0	X	X	3

Sheet 3	1	2	3	4	5	6	7	8	Final
(Manitoba) Team Njegovan 🔨	1	1	0	0	1	0	1	0	4
(Sweden) Anna Hasselborg	0	0	2	1	0	1	0	1	5

Sheet 4	1	2	3	4	5	6	7	8	Final
(South Korea) Gim Eun-ji 🔨	0	2	0	0	0	1	0	1	4
(Japan) Yuina Miura	1	0	0	1	0	0	1	0	3

Sheet 5	1	2	3	4	5	6	7	8	Final
(Japan) Miku Nihira	0	1	0	0	0	1	0	X	2
(Switzerland) Xenia Schwaller 🔨	2	0	0	2	1	0	1	X	6

== Playoffs ==
Quarterfinals
A2	(Manitoba) Kerri Einarson	6
C4	(Alberta) Selena Sturmay	10
C1	(Switzerland) Xenia Schwaller	5
B2	(Sweden) Isabella Wranå	3
B1	(Switzerland) Alina Pätz	5
C2	(South Korea) Gim Eun-ji	7
C3	(Sweden) Anna Hasselborg	7
A1	(Japan) Ikue Kitazawa	6

Semifinals
C4	(Alberta) Selena Sturmay	6
C1	(Switzerland) Xenia Schwaller	2
C2	(South Korea) Gim Eun-ji	7
C3	(Sweden) Anna Hasselborg	4

Final
C4	(Alberta) Selena Sturmay	7
C2	(South Korea) Gim Eun-ji	3

=== Quarterfinals ===
Sunday, October 11, 9:00 am

Sheet 1	1	2	3	4	5	6	7	8	Final
(Switzerland) Alina Pätz 🔨	1	0	2	0	1	0	1	0	5
(South Korea) Gim Eun-ji	0	2	0	2	0	2	0	1	7

Sheet 2	1	2	3	4	5	6	7	8	Final
(Sweden) Anna Hasselborg	0	3	0	0	1	0	0	3	7
(Japan) Ikue Kitazawa 🔨	1	0	0	1	0	2	2	0	6

Sheet 4	1	2	3	4	5	6	7	8	Final
(Switzerland) Xenia Schwaller	0	1	1	1	0	2	0	X	5
(Sweden) Isabella Wranå 🔨	2	0	0	0	0	0	1	X	3

Sheet 5	1	2	3	4	5	6	7	8	Final
(Manitoba) Kerri Einarson 🔨	0	1	0	2	0	3	0	X	6
(Alberta) Selena Sturmay	1	0	2	0	5	0	2	X	10

=== Semifinals ===
Sunday, October 11, 12:15 pm

Sheet 1	1	2	3	4	5	6	7	8	Final
(Alberta) Selena Sturmay 🔨	0	0	3	1	2	0	X	X	6
(Switzerland) Xenia Schwaller	0	1	0	0	0	1	X	X	2

Sheet 4	1	2	3	4	5	6	7	8	Final
(South Korea) Gim Eun-ji 🔨	1	2	0	1	0	1	0	2	7
(Sweden) Anna Hasselborg	0	0	1	0	2	0	1	0	4

=== Final ===
Sunday, October 11, 3:30 pm

Sheet 3	1	2	3	4	5	6	7	8	Final
(Alberta) Selena Sturmay	0	0	2	0	1	1	2	1	7
(South Korea) Gim Eun-ji 🔨	0	1	0	2	0	0	0	0	3
