= 2023 Women's Masters Basel =

World Curling Tour event

- Host city: Arlesheim, Switzerland
- Arena: Curlingzentrum Region Basel
- Dates: September 15–17
- Winner: (Switzerland) Team Tirinzoni
- Curling club: CC Aarau, Aarau
- Skip: Silvana Tirinzoni
- Fourth: Alina Pätz
- Second: Selina Witschonke
- Lead: Carole Howald
- Coach: Pierre Charette
- Finalist: (Sweden) Anna Hasselborg

The 2023 Women's Masters Basel was held from September 15 to 17 at the Curlingzentrum Region Basel in Arlesheim, Switzerland as part of the World Curling Tour. The event was held in a round robin format with a purse of 32,000 CHF. It was the first women's World Curling Tour event of the 2023–24 curling season.

Silvana Tirinzoni and her revised lineup of Alina Pätz, Selina Witschonke and Carole Howald dominated the event, winning all seven of their games en route to claiming the title. In the final, the four-time defending world champions scored three in the first end and six in the fifth to down Sweden's Anna Hasselborg 10–2. To reach the final, Tirinzoni went 4–0 through the round robin and then beat Marianne Rørvik and Madeleine Dupont in the quarterfinals and semifinals respectively. The Hasselborg rink also won all of their games in the round robin before winning 7–1 over Isabella Wranå in the quarters and 5–4 against Stefania Constantini in the semis. Michèle Jäggi and Anna Kubešková also made the playoffs but lost in the quarterfinals. Newly retired Daniela Jentsch of Germany spared for Team Jäggi at third.

== Teams ==
The teams are listed as follows:

Skip	Third	Second	Lead	Alternate	Locale
Emira Abbes	Lena Kapp	Mia Höhne	Pia-Lisa Schöll (Note: Pia-Lisa Schöll spared for Maike Beer.)		Füssen, Germany
Torild Bjørnstad	Nora Østgård	Ingeborg Forbregd	Eilin Kjærland		Oppdal, Norway
Kathrine Blackham	Jana Hoffmann	Johanna Blackham	Anika Meier		Basel, Switzerland
Stefania Constantini	Elena Mathis (Note: Alternate Elena Mathis played third while third Marta Lo Deserto shifted to second, replacing Angela Romei.)	Marta Lo Deserto	Giulia Zardini Lacedelli		Cortina d'Ampezzo, Italy
Madeleine Dupont	Jasmin Lander	Denise Dupont	My Larsen		Hvidovre, Denmark
Isabel Einspieler	Alissa Rudolf	Jana Hählen	Renée Frigo		St. Gallen, Switzerland
Kristyna Farková	Julie Zelingrová	Stella Svitáková	Karolína Němcová	Ema Kosakova	Prague, Czech Republic
Anna Hasselborg	Sara McManus	Agnes Knochenhauer	Sofia Mabergs	Johanna Heldin	Sundbyberg, Sweden
Elina Arnold (Fourth)	Sophie Heinimann (Skip)	Florence von Radowitz	Lucia Nebbia	Julia Suter	Basel, Switzerland
Fay Henderson	Hailey Duff	Amy MacDonald	Katie McMillan		Stirling, Scotland
Roxane Héritier	Melina Bezzola	Anna Gut	Nadine Bärtschiger		Luzern, Switzerland
Corrie Hürlimann	Celine Schwizgebel	Sarah Müller	Marina Lörtscher	Briar Schwaller-Hürlimann	Zug, Switzerland
Michèle Jäggi	Daniela Jentsch (Note: Daniela Jentsch spared for Team Jäggi who only had three players.)	Stefanie Berset	Lisa Muhmenthaler		Bern, Switzerland
Anna Kubešková	Aneta Müllerová	Klára Svatoňová	Karolína Špundová	Michaela Baudyšová	Prague, Czech Republic
Robyn Munro	Lisa Davie	Holly Wilkie-Milne	Laura Watt		Stirling, Scotland
Park You-been	Lee Eun-chae	Yang Seung-hee	Kim Ji-yoon		Seoul, South Korea
Kristin Skaslien (Fourth)	Marianne Rørvik (Skip)	Mille Haslev Nordbye	Martine Rønning		Lillehammer, Norway
Xenia Schwaller	Selina Gafner	Fabienne Rieder	Selina Rychiger	Marion Wüest	Zurich, Switzerland
Alina Pätz (Fourth)	Silvana Tirinzoni (Skip)	Selina Witschonke	Carole Howald		Aarau, Switzerland
Isabella Wranå	Almida de Val	Maria Larsson	Linda Stenlund		Sundbyberg, Sweden

== Round robin standings ==
Final Round Robin Standings

Key
Teams to Playoffs

Pool A	W	L	PF	PA
(Switzerland) Silvana Tirinzoni	4	0	28	12
(Switzerland) Michèle Jäggi	3	1	23	14
(South Korea) Park You-been	2	2	20	25
(Germany) Emira Abbes	1	3	21	22
(Czech Republic) Kristyna Farková	0	4	12	31

Pool B	W	L	PF	PA
(Denmark) Madeleine Dupont	3	1	24	12
(Sweden) Isabella Wranå	3	1	28	18
(Switzerland) Xenia Schwaller	2	2	25	17
(Scotland) Fay Henderson	2	2	15	27
(Switzerland) Isabel Einspieler	0	4	15	33

Pool C	W	L	PF	PA
(Sweden) Anna Hasselborg	4	0	24	8
(Italy) Stefania Constantini	3	1	24	18
(Norway) Torild Bjørnstad	2	2	27	29
(Scotland) Robyn Munro	1	3	20	25
(Switzerland) Katherine Blachkam	0	4	16	31

Pool D	W	L	PF	PA
(Czech Republic) Anna Kubešková	3	1	20	14
(Norway) Marianne Rørvik	3	1	27	10
(Switzerland) Corrie Hürlimann	2	2	17	16
(Switzerland) Roxane Héritier	2	2	23	21
(Switzerland) Sophie Heinimann	0	4	6	32

== Round robin results ==
All draw times listed in Central European Time (UTC+01:00).

=== Draw 1 ===
Friday, September 15, 8:30 am

Sheet 1	1	2	3	4	5	6	7	8	Final
(Switzerland) Silvana Tirinzoni 🔨	1	1	0	2	0	3	0	X	7
(Czech Republic) Kristyna Farková	0	0	1	0	1	0	2	X	4

Sheet 2	1	2	3	4	5	6	7	8	Final
(Switzerland) Michèle Jäggi	0	1	1	2	1	3	0	X	8
(South Korea) Park You-been 🔨	2	0	0	0	0	0	1	X	3

Sheet 3	1	2	3	4	5	6	7	8	Final
(Sweden) Isabella Wranå 🔨	0	3	0	0	4	0	3	X	10
(Switzerland) Isabel Einspieler	1	0	2	0	0	2	0	X	5

Sheet 4	1	2	3	4	5	6	7	8	Final
(Sweden) Anna Hasselborg	3	0	0	3	0	0	X	X	6
(Switzerland) Katherine Blachkam 🔨	0	1	0	0	0	1	X	X	2

Sheet 5	1	2	3	4	5	6	7	8	9	Final
(Italy) Stefania Constantini	0	3	0	2	0	0	2	0	3	10
(Norway) Torild Bjørnstad 🔨	2	0	1	0	2	1	0	1	0	7

=== Draw 2 ===
Friday, September 15, 12:00 pm

Sheet 1	1	2	3	4	5	6	7	8	Final
(Norway) Marianne Rørvik	0	0	1	0	0	1	1	0	3
(Czech Republic) Anna Kubešková 🔨	0	1	0	1	1	0	0	1	4

Sheet 2	1	2	3	4	5	6	7	8	Final
(Czech Republic) Kristyna Farková 🔨	1	0	1	1	0	1	0	X	4
(Germany) Emira Abbes	0	2	0	0	3	0	6	X	11

Sheet 3	1	2	3	4	5	6	7	8	Final
(Switzerland) Katherine Blachkam	1	0	0	0	0	1	X	X	2
(Scotland) Robyn Munro 🔨	0	2	3	1	3	0	X	X	9

Sheet 4	1	2	3	4	5	6	7	8	Final
(Switzerland) Corrie Hürlimann 🔨	0	2	1	1	1	0	0	X	5
(Switzerland) Sophie Heinimann	0	0	0	0	0	1	1	X	2

Sheet 5	1	2	3	4	5	6	7	8	9	Final
(Denmark) Madeleine Dupont	0	1	0	0	1	0	0	1	0	3
(Scotland) Fay Henderson 🔨	0	0	0	1	0	2	0	0	1	4

=== Draw 3 ===
Friday, September 15, 4:00 pm

Sheet 1	1	2	3	4	5	6	7	8	Final
(Scotland) Fay Henderson	0	0	2	0	X	X	X	X	2
(Sweden) Isabella Wranå 🔨	2	4	0	4	X	X	X	X	10

Sheet 2	1	2	3	4	5	6	7	8	Final
(Norway) Torild Bjørnstad	0	1	0	0	0	1	0	X	2
(Sweden) Anna Hasselborg 🔨	1	0	0	1	2	0	3	X	7

Sheet 3	1	2	3	4	5	6	7	8	Final
(South Korea) Park You-been	0	1	0	0	1	0	X	X	2
(Switzerland) Silvana Tirinzoni 🔨	4	0	2	1	0	3	X	X	10

Sheet 4	1	2	3	4	5	6	7	8	Final
(Czech Republic) Anna Kubešková 🔨	0	1	2	0	1	0	2	0	6
(Switzerland) Roxane Héritier	0	0	0	1	0	3	0	3	7

Sheet 5	1	2	3	4	5	6	7	8	Final
(Switzerland) Isabel Einspieler	0	1	0	0	0	2	0	X	3
(Switzerland) Xenia Schwaller 🔨	0	0	1	1	3	0	2	X	7

=== Draw 4 ===
Friday, September 15, 7:30 pm

Sheet 1	1	2	3	4	5	6	7	8	Final
(Scotland) Robyn Munro 🔨	0	0	0	1	0	3	0	0	4
(Italy) Stefania Constantini	1	0	2	0	1	0	1	1	6

Sheet 2	1	2	3	4	5	6	7	8	Final
(Switzerland) Sophie Heinimann	0	0	0	0	X	X	X	X	0
(Norway) Marianne Rørvik 🔨	3	2	4	2	X	X	X	X	11

Sheet 3	1	2	3	4	5	6	7	8	Final
(Switzerland) Roxane Héritier	0	0	0	1	1	0	X	X	2
(Switzerland) Corrie Hürlimann 🔨	3	1	2	0	0	2	X	X	8

Sheet 4	1	2	3	4	5	6	7	8	Final
(Switzerland) Xenia Schwaller 🔨	0	1	0	1	0	1	0	0	3
(Denmark) Madeleine Dupont	0	0	2	0	2	0	1	1	6

Sheet 5	1	2	3	4	5	6	7	8	Final
(Germany) Emira Abbes 🔨	0	1	1	0	0	1	0	X	3
(Switzerland) Michèle Jäggi	0	0	0	1	1	0	4	X	6

=== Draw 5 ===
Saturday, September 16, 8:00 am

Sheet 1	1	2	3	4	5	6	7	8	Final
(Denmark) Madeleine Dupont 🔨	0	2	0	0	2	0	5	X	9
(Switzerland) Isabel Einspieler	0	0	1	1	0	1	0	X	3

Sheet 2	1	2	3	4	5	6	7	8	Final
(Italy) Stefania Constantini 🔨	2	0	3	0	0	2	0	X	7
(Switzerland) Katherine Blachkam	0	1	0	2	1	0	0	X	4

Sheet 3	1	2	3	4	5	6	7	8	Final
(Switzerland) Michèle Jäggi	0	2	1	0	0	1	1	X	5
(Czech Republic) Kristyna Farková 🔨	1	0	0	0	1	0	0	X	2

Sheet 4	1	2	3	4	5	6	7	8	Final
(Germany) Emira Abbes 🔨	0	0	0	0	1	0	1	X	2
(Switzerland) Silvana Tirinzoni	1	0	2	1	0	1	0	X	5

Sheet 5	1	2	3	4	5	6	7	8	Final
(Scotland) Robyn Munro 🔨	0	1	1	0	1	0	0	X	3
(Sweden) Anna Hasselborg	0	0	0	3	0	2	3	X	8

=== Draw 6 ===
Saturday, September 16, 11:30 am

Sheet 1	1	2	3	4	5	6	7	8	Final
(South Korea) Park You-been	0	0	2	1	1	0	3	X	7
(Germany) Emira Abbes 🔨	2	2	0	0	0	1	0	X	5

Sheet 2	1	2	3	4	5	6	7	8	Final
(Czech Republic) Anna Kubešková	0	1	0	1	0	1	1	X	4
(Switzerland) Corrie Hürlimann 🔨	1	0	1	0	0	0	0	X	2

Sheet 3	1	2	3	4	5	6	7	8	Final
(Switzerland) Xenia Schwaller 🔨	2	0	1	0	1	0	1	0	5
(Sweden) Isabella Wranå	0	1	0	3	0	1	0	1	6

Sheet 4	1	2	3	4	5	6	7	8	Final
(Norway) Torild Bjørnstad	0	0	3	0	4	0	2	X	9
(Scotland) Robyn Munro 🔨	1	1	0	1	0	1	0	X	4

Sheet 5	1	2	3	4	5	6	7	8	Final
(Norway) Marianne Rørvik	0	0	2	0	1	0	2	0	5
(Switzerland) Roxane Héritier 🔨	0	1	0	1	0	1	0	1	4

=== Draw 7 ===
Saturday, September 16, 3:30 pm

Sheet 1	1	2	3	4	5	6	7	8	Final
(Switzerland) Katherine Blachkam 🔨	0	4	0	2	0	0	2	0	8
(Norway) Torild Bjørnstad	1	0	1	0	4	2	0	1	9

Sheet 2	1	2	3	4	5	6	7	8	Final
(Switzerland) Silvana Tirinzoni	0	0	2	2	1	0	1	X	6
(Switzerland) Michèle Jäggi 🔨	1	2	0	0	0	1	0	X	4

Sheet 3	1	2	3	4	5	6	7	8	Final
(Sweden) Anna Hasselborg 🔨	0	1	1	0	0	1	0	X	3
(Italy) Stefania Constantini	0	0	0	0	0	0	1	X	1

Sheet 4	1	2	3	4	5	6	7	8	Final
(Switzerland) Isabel Einspieler	1	1	0	1	1	0	0	X	4
(Scotland) Fay Henderson 🔨	0	0	2	0	0	2	3	X	7

Sheet 5	1	2	3	4	5	6	7	8	Final
(Switzerland) Sophie Heinimann	0	0	0	0	1	0	1	X	2
(Czech Republic) Anna Kubešková 🔨	2	1	0	1	0	2	0	X	6

=== Draw 8 ===
Saturday, September 16, 7:30 pm

Sheet 1	1	2	3	4	5	6	7	8	Final
(Switzerland) Roxane Héritier 🔨	1	0	2	5	2	X	X	X	10
(Switzerland) Sophie Heinimann	0	2	0	0	0	X	X	X	2

Sheet 2	1	2	3	4	5	6	7	8	Final
(Sweden) Isabella Wranå	1	0	0	1	0	0	0	X	2
(Denmark) Madeleine Dupont 🔨	0	2	1	0	1	1	1	X	6

Sheet 3	1	2	3	4	5	6	7	8	Final
(Switzerland) Corrie Hürlimann 🔨	0	0	1	0	1	0	0	X	2
(Norway) Marianne Rørvik	1	0	0	3	0	1	3	X	8

Sheet 4	1	2	3	4	5	6	7	8	Final
(Czech Republic) Kristyna Farková	0	1	0	0	0	1	0	X	2
(South Korea) Park You-been 🔨	2	0	2	2	1	0	1	X	8

Sheet 5	1	2	3	4	5	6	7	8	Final
(Scotland) Fay Henderson	0	1	0	1	0	X	X	X	2
(Switzerland) Xenia Schwaller 🔨	3	0	4	0	3	X	X	X	10

== Playoffs ==
Quarterfinals
1	(Switzerland) Silvana Tirinzoni	4
8	(Norway) Marianne Rørvik	1
4	(Czech Republic) Anna Kubešková	5
5	(Denmark) Madeleine Dupont	7
2	(Sweden) Anna Hasselborg	7
7	(Sweden) Isabella Wranå	1
3	(Switzerland) Michèle Jäggi	3
6	(Italy) Stefania Constantini	6

Semifinals
1	(Switzerland) Silvana Tirinzoni	8
5	(Denmark) Madeleine Dupont	4
2	(Sweden) Anna Hasselborg	5
6	(Italy) Stefania Constantini	4

Final
1	(Switzerland) Silvana Tirinzoni	10
2	(Sweden) Anna Hasselborg	2

=== Quarterfinals ===
Sunday, September 17, 8:00 am

Sheet 1	1	2	3	4	5	6	7	8	Final
(Switzerland) Michèle Jäggi 🔨	2	0	0	0	1	0	0	X	3
(Italy) Stefania Constantini	0	0	0	1	0	2	3	X	6

Sheet 2	1	2	3	4	5	6	7	8	Final
(Sweden) Anna Hasselborg 🔨	1	1	0	1	1	1	2	X	7
(Sweden) Isabella Wranå	0	0	1	0	0	0	0	X	1

Sheet 4	1	2	3	4	5	6	7	8	Final
(Switzerland) Silvana Tirinzoni 🔨	1	0	0	2	0	0	1	X	4
(Norway) Marianne Rørvik	0	1	0	0	0	0	0	X	1

Sheet 5	1	2	3	4	5	6	7	8	Final
(Czech Republic) Anna Kubešková 🔨	0	2	0	2	0	1	0	X	5
(Denmark) Madeleine Dupont	1	0	3	0	1	0	2	X	7

=== Semifinals ===
Sunday, September 17, 11:15 am

Sheet 2	1	2	3	4	5	6	7	8	Final
(Switzerland) Silvana Tirinzoni 🔨	0	1	0	0	1	1	0	5	8
(Denmark) Madeleine Dupont	0	0	0	2	0	0	2	0	4

Sheet 4	1	2	3	4	5	6	7	8	Final
(Sweden) Anna Hasselborg 🔨	1	0	3	0	0	0	1	0	5
(Italy) Stefania Constantini	0	2	0	0	1	0	0	1	4

=== Final ===
Sunday, September 17, 2:30 pm

Sheet 3	1	2	3	4	5	6	7	8	Final
(Switzerland) Silvana Tirinzoni 🔨	3	0	1	0	6	X	X	X	10
(Sweden) Anna Hasselborg	0	1	0	1	0	X	X	X	2
