= 2021 Women's Masters Basel =

World Curling Tour event

- Host city: Arlesheim, Switzerland
- Arena: Curlingzentrum Region Basel
- Dates: October 1–3
- Winner: (Denmark) Team Dupont
- Curling club: Hvidovre CC, Hvidovre
- Skip: Madeleine Dupont
- Third: Mathilde Halse
- Second: Denise Dupont
- Lead: My Larsen
- Alternate: Lina Knudsen
- Finalist: (Sweden) Anna Hasselborg

The 2021 Women's Masters Basel was held from October 1 to 3 at the Curlingzentrum Region Basel in Arlesheim, Switzerland as part of the World Curling Tour. The event was held in a round-robin format with a purse of 35,000 CHF. It was the second women's World Curling Tour event of the 2021–22 curling season.

== Teams ==
The teams are listed as follows:

Skip	Third	Second	Lead	Alternate	Locale
Madeleine Dupont	Mathilde Halse	Denise Dupont	My Larsen	Lina Knudsen	Hvidovre, Denmark
Beth Farmer	Sophie Jackson	Kirstin Bousie	Emma Barr		Kinross, Scotland
Anna Hasselborg	Sara McManus	Agnes Knochenhauer	Sofia Mabergs		Sundbyberg, Sweden
Laura Heinimann	Kathrine Blackham	Johanna Blackham	Anika Meier		Basel, Switzerland
Briar Hürlimann (Fourth)	Corrie Hürlimann (Skip)	Melina Bezzola	Anna Gut	Jessica Jäggi	Zug, Switzerland
Daniela Jentsch	Emira Abbes	Klara-Hermine Fomm	Analena Jentsch	Mia Höhne	Füssen, Germany
Selina Witschonke (Fourth)	Elena Mathis	Raphaela Keiser (Skip)	Marina Lörtscher		St. Moritz, Switzerland
Kim Eun-jung	Kim Kyeong-ae	Kim Cho-hi	Kim Seon-yeong	Kim Yeong-mi	Gangneung, South Korea
Alina Kovaleva	Yulia Portunova	Galina Arsenkina	Ekaterina Kuzmina		Saint Petersburg, Russia
Anna Kubešková	Alžběta Baudyšová	Petra Vinšová	Ežen Kolčevská	Michaela Baudyšová	Prague, Czech Republic
Rebecca Morrison (Note: As part of the nine-player national squad, Teams Gina Aitken and Eve Muirhead formed two new teams named GB Red and GB Blue. Rebecca Morrison skipped GB Red and Eve Muirhead skipped GB Blue.)	Vicky Wright	Jennifer Dodds	Sophie Sinclair		Stirling, Scotland
Sarah Müller	Malin Da Ros	Marion Wüest	Selina Gafner	Xenia Schwaller	Biel, Switzerland
Eve Muirhead	Gina Aitken	Lauren Gray	Mili Smith	Hailey Duff	Stirling, Scotland
Irina Nizovtseva	Vera Tiuliakova (Note: Lead Vera Tiuliakova moved up to play third, with alternate Iulia Chemodanova stepping in to play lead and third Liudmila Privivkova sitting out.)	Olga Kotelnikova	Iulia Chemodanova	Liudmila Privivkova	Moscow, Russia
Fabienne Rieder	Tina Zürcher	Nadine Rieder	Selina Rychiger	Najda Hophanan	Bern, Switzerland
Marianne Rørvik	Mille Haslev Nordbye	Eli Skaslien	Martine Rønning		Oslo, Norway
Irene Schori	Carole Howald	Lara Stocker	Stefanie Berset		Langenthal, Switzerland
Alina Pätz (Fourth)	Silvana Tirinzoni (Skip)	Esther Neuenschwander	Melanie Barbezat		Aarau, Switzerland
Isabella Wranå	Almida de Val	Jennie Wåhlin	Maria Larsson		Sundbyberg, Sweden
Ladina Müller (Fourth)	Nora Wüest (Skip)	Anna Stern	Karin Winter	Lisa Gugler	Wetzikon, Switzerland

== Round-robin standings ==
Final round-robin standings

Key
Teams to Playoffs

Pool A	W	L	PF	PA
(Switzerland) Raphaela Keiser	4	0	26	13
(Sweden) Anna Hasselborg	3	1	21	16
(Germany) Daniela Jentsch	1	3	19	22
(Russia) Irina Nizovtseva	1	3	20	26
(Switzerland) Fabienne Rieder	1	3	16	25

Pool B	W	L	PF	PA
(Switzerland) Silvana Tirinzoni	4	0	24	14
(Switzerland) Irene Schori	3	1	27	16
(Denmark) Madeleine Dupont	2	2	23	18
(Norway) Marianne Rørvik	1	3	18	25
(Scotland) Beth Farmer	0	4	12	31

Pool C	W	L	PF	PA
(Sweden) Isabella Wranå	3	1	27	13
(Scotland) GB Blue	3	1	21	13
(Switzerland) Corrie Hürlimann	2	2	21	24
(Czech Republic) Anna Kubešková	1	3	13	20
(Switzerland) Sarah Müller	1	3	15	27

Pool D	W	L	PF	PA
(Scotland) GB Red	4	0	30	8
(South Korea) Kim Eun-jung	2	2	19	20
(Russia) Alina Kovaleva	2	2	26	13
(Switzerland) Nora Wüest	2	2	20	19
(Switzerland) Laura Heinimann	0	4	4	39

== Round-robin results ==
All draw times listed in Central European Time (UTC+01:00).

=== Draw 1 ===
Friday, October 1, 9:00 am

Sheet 1	1	2	3	4	5	6	7	8	Final
(Sweden) Anna Hasselborg 🔨	0	1	0	0	3	0	3	X	7
(Russia) Irina Nizovtseva	1	0	0	1	0	1	0	X	3

Sheet 2	1	2	3	4	5	6	7	8	Final
(Germany) Daniela Jentsch	0	1	1	0	0	3	0	2	7
(Switzerland) Fabienne Rieder 🔨	1	0	0	2	2	0	1	0	6

Sheet 3	1	2	3	4	5	6	7	8	Final
(Switzerland) Silvana Tirinzoni	0	0	1	0	1	1	2	X	5
(Denmark) Madeleine Dupont 🔨	2	0	0	0	0	0	0	X	2

Sheet 4	1	2	3	4	5	6	7	8	Final
(Scotland) GB Blue	1	2	0	0	1	3	X	X	7
(Czech Republic) Anna Kubešková 🔨	0	0	1	0	0	0	X	X	1

Sheet 5	1	2	3	4	5	6	7	8	Final
(Sweden) Isabella Wranå 🔨	2	2	2	1	0	1	X	X	8
(Switzerland) Sarah Müller	0	0	0	0	2	0	X	X	2

=== Draw 2 ===
Friday, October 1, 12:00 pm

Sheet 1	1	2	3	4	5	6	7	8	Final
(Russia) Alina Kovaleva 🔨	2	0	7	3	X	X	X	X	12
(Switzerland) Laura Heinimann	0	1	0	0	X	X	X	X	1

Sheet 2	1	2	3	4	5	6	7	8	Final
(Russia) Irina Nizovtseva	0	0	4	1	0	2	0	0	7
(Switzerland) Raphaela Keiser 🔨	3	2	0	0	1	0	0	2	8

Sheet 3	1	2	3	4	5	6	7	8	Final
(Czech Republic) Anna Kubešková	0	0	1	0	1	0	1	0	3
(Switzerland) Corrie Hürlimann 🔨	0	2	0	2	0	1	0	1	6

Sheet 4	1	2	3	4	5	6	7	8	Final
(South Korea) Kim Eun-jung 🔨	2	1	0	3	0	1	X	X	7
(Switzerland) Nora Wüest	0	0	1	0	1	0	X	X	2

Sheet 5	1	2	3	4	5	6	7	8	Final
(Switzerland) Irene Schori 🔨	0	2	4	2	X	X	X	X	8
(Norway) Marianne Rørvik	0	0	0	0	X	X	X	X	0

=== Draw 3 ===
Friday, October 1, 3:30 pm

Sheet 1	1	2	3	4	5	6	7	8	Final
(Norway) Marianne Rørvik 🔨	1	0	1	0	2	1	0	0	5
(Switzerland) Silvana Tirinzoni	0	3	0	2	0	0	0	1	6

Sheet 2	1	2	3	4	5	6	7	8	Final
(Switzerland) Sarah Müller	0	1	0	0	2	0	1	X	4
(Scotland) GB Blue 🔨	1	0	2	2	0	2	0	X	7

Sheet 3	1	2	3	4	5	6	7	8	Final
(Switzerland) Fabienne Rieder	0	0	0	1	0	X	X	X	1
(Sweden) Anna Hasselborg 🔨	2	2	1	0	2	X	X	X	7

Sheet 4	1	2	3	4	5	6	7	8	Final
(Switzerland) Laura Heinimann	0	0	1	0	0	X	X	X	1
(Scotland) GB Red 🔨	5	1	0	3	1	X	X	X	10

Sheet 5	1	2	3	4	5	6	7	8	Final
(Denmark) Madeleine Dupont 🔨	0	3	1	2	1	4	X	X	11
(Scotland) Beth Farmer	1	0	0	0	0	0	X	X	1

=== Draw 4 ===
Friday, October 1, 7:00 pm

Sheet 1	1	2	3	4	5	6	7	8	Final
(Switzerland) Corrie Hürlimann	0	0	2	0	1	0	0	X	3
(Sweden) Isabella Wranå 🔨	3	1	0	2	0	1	5	X	12

Sheet 2	1	2	3	4	5	6	7	8	Final
(Switzerland) Nora Wüest	3	0	1	0	0	0	2	X	6
(Russia) Alina Kovaleva 🔨	0	1	0	2	0	1	0	X	4

Sheet 3	1	2	3	4	5	6	7	8	Final
(Scotland) GB Red	0	3	2	0	1	1	X	X	7
(South Korea) Kim Eun-jung 🔨	2	0	0	1	0	0	X	X	3

Sheet 4	1	2	3	4	5	6	7	8	Final
(Scotland) Beth Farmer	0	0	2	2	0	2	0	0	6
(Switzerland) Irene Schori 🔨	2	1	0	0	1	0	2	1	7

Sheet 5	1	2	3	4	5	6	7	8	Final
(Switzerland) Raphaela Keiser 🔨	1	0	0	0	1	0	1	1	4
(Germany) Daniela Jentsch	0	0	0	2	0	1	0	0	3

=== Draw 5 ===
Saturday, October 2, 9:00 am

Sheet 1	1	2	3	4	5	6	7	8	Final
(Switzerland) Irene Schori	1	1	0	1	0	0	3	X	6
(Denmark) Madeleine Dupont 🔨	0	0	1	0	1	1	0	X	3

Sheet 2	1	2	3	4	5	6	7	8	Final
(Sweden) Isabella Wranå 🔨	2	0	0	2	1	0	0	X	5
(Czech Republic) Anna Kubešková	0	0	2	0	0	1	0	X	3

Sheet 3	1	2	3	4	5	6	7	8	Final
(Germany) Daniela Jentsch 🔨	0	0	1	0	0	2	1	X	4
(Russia) Irina Nizovtseva	1	1	0	1	3	0	0	X	6

Sheet 4	1	2	3	4	5	6	7	8	Final
(Switzerland) Raphaela Keiser 🔨	0	4	1	2	X	X	X	X	7
(Sweden) Anna Hasselborg	1	0	0	0	X	X	X	X	1

Sheet 5	1	2	3	4	5	6	7	8	Final
(Switzerland) Corrie Hürlimann 🔨	0	2	0	1	0	2	1	X	6
(Scotland) GB Blue	0	0	1	0	1	0	0	X	2

=== Draw 6 ===
Saturday, October 2, 12:00 pm

Sheet 1	1	2	3	4	5	6	7	8	Final
(Switzerland) Fabienne Rieder	0	0	0	1	0	1	0	X	2
(Switzerland) Raphaela Keiser 🔨	0	2	1	0	2	0	2	X	7

Sheet 2	1	2	3	4	5	6	7	8	Final
(Switzerland) Laura Heinimann 🔨	1	0	0	1	0	0	0	X	2
(South Korea) Kim Eun-jung	0	1	1	0	1	1	4	X	8

Sheet 3	1	2	3	4	5	6	7	8	Final
(Scotland) Beth Farmer	0	0	1	0	0	X	X	X	1
(Switzerland) Silvana Tirinzoni 🔨	2	1	0	2	1	X	X	X	6

Sheet 4	1	2	3	4	5	6	7	8	9	Final
(Switzerland) Sarah Müller 🔨	1	0	0	2	0	3	0	0	1	7
(Switzerland) Corrie Hürlimann	0	2	0	0	2	0	1	1	0	6

Sheet 5	1	2	3	4	5	6	7	8	Final
(Russia) Alina Kovaleva	0	1	0	0	0	0	0	X	1
(Scotland) GB Red 🔨	1	0	0	1	0	1	2	X	5

=== Draw 7 ===
Saturday, October 2, 3:30 pm

Sheet 1	1	2	3	4	5	6	7	8	Final
(Czech Republic) Anna Kubešková 🔨	2	1	0	1	0	2	X	X	6
(Switzerland) Sarah Müller	0	0	1	0	1	0	X	X	2

Sheet 2	1	2	3	4	5	6	7	8	Final
(Sweden) Anna Hasselborg	0	3	0	0	2	1	0	0	6
(Germany) Daniela Jentsch 🔨	1	0	0	2	0	0	1	1	5

Sheet 3	1	2	3	4	5	6	7	8	Final
(Scotland) GB Blue	0	0	1	1	2	1	0	X	5
(Sweden) Isabella Wranå 🔨	0	2	0	0	0	0	0	X	2

Sheet 4	1	2	3	4	5	6	7	8	Final
(Denmark) Madeleine Dupont 🔨	0	1	2	0	1	1	0	2	7
(Norway) Marianne Rørvik	4	0	0	1	0	0	1	0	6

Sheet 5	1	2	3	4	5	6	7	8	Final
(Switzerland) Nora Wüest 🔨	3	2	3	1	X	X	X	X	9
(Switzerland) Laura Heinimann	0	0	0	0	X	X	X	X	0

=== Draw 8 ===
Saturday, October 2, 7:00 pm

Sheet 1	1	2	3	4	5	6	7	8	Final
(Scotland) GB Red	0	2	1	0	3	0	2	X	8
(Switzerland) Nora Wüest 🔨	1	0	0	1	0	1	0	X	3

Sheet 2	1	2	3	4	5	6	7	8	9	Final
(Switzerland) Silvana Tirinzoni	0	2	0	2	0	0	2	0	1	7
(Switzerland) Irene Schori 🔨	1	0	2	0	0	2	0	1	0	6

Sheet 3	1	2	3	4	5	6	7	8	Final
(South Korea) Kim Eun-jung	0	1	0	0	X	X	X	X	1
(Russia) Alina Kovaleva 🔨	2	0	3	4	X	X	X	X	9

Sheet 4	1	2	3	4	5	6	7	8	Final
(Russia) Irina Nizovtseva 🔨	0	0	0	1	0	3	0	X	4
(Switzerland) Fabienne Rieder	0	3	1	0	1	0	2	X	7

Sheet 5	1	2	3	4	5	6	7	8	9	Final
(Norway) Marianne Rørvik 🔨	0	0	0	2	1	0	1	0	3	7
(Scotland) Beth Farmer	0	1	0	0	0	1	0	2	0	4

== Playoffs ==
Quarterfinals
1	(Switzerland) Raphaela Keiser	7
8	(Denmark) Madeleine Dupont	8
4	(Sweden) Isabella Wranå	5
5	(Switzerland) Irene Schori	4
2	(Scotland) GB Red	6
7	(Scotland) GB Blue	7
3	(Switzerland) Silvana Tirinzoni	3
6	(Sweden) Anna Hasselborg	5

Semifinals
8	(Denmark) Madeleine Dupont	8
4	(Sweden) Isabella Wranå	6
7	(Scotland) GB Blue	4
6	(Sweden) Anna Hasselborg	7

Final
8	(Denmark) Madeleine Dupont	4
6	(Sweden) Anna Hasselborg	3

=== Quarterfinals ===
Sunday, October 3, 8:00 am

Sheet 1	1	2	3	4	5	6	7	8	9	Final
(Sweden) Isabella Wranå 🔨	0	1	0	1	0	2	0	0	1	5
(Switzerland) Irene Schori	0	0	2	0	1	0	0	1	0	4

Sheet 2	1	2	3	4	5	6	7	8	Final
(Switzerland) Raphaela Keiser 🔨	0	0	2	0	1	0	4	0	7
(Denmark) Madeleine Dupont	0	3	0	2	0	2	0	1	8

Sheet 4	1	2	3	4	5	6	7	8	Final
(Switzerland) Silvana Tirinzoni 🔨	1	0	1	0	0	0	1	0	3
(Sweden) Anna Hasselborg	0	1	0	1	0	1	0	2	5

Sheet 5	1	2	3	4	5	6	7	8	9	Final
(Scotland) GB Red 🔨	0	1	0	1	3	0	0	1	0	6
(Scotland) GB Blue	0	0	3	0	0	2	1	0	1	7

=== Semifinals ===
Sunday, October 3, 11:15 am

Sheet 2	1	2	3	4	5	6	7	8	Final
(Scotland) GB Blue 🔨	1	0	0	1	0	2	0	X	4
(Sweden) Anna Hasselborg	0	1	2	0	1	0	3	X	7

Sheet 4	1	2	3	4	5	6	7	8	Final
(Denmark) Madeleine Dupont	0	2	0	2	3	1	0	X	8
(Sweden) Isabella Wranå 🔨	1	0	2	0	0	0	3	X	6

=== Final ===
Sunday, October 3, 2:30 pm

Sheet 3	1	2	3	4	5	6	7	8	Final
(Denmark) Madeleine Dupont	0	0	0	2	0	0	0	2	4
(Sweden) Anna Hasselborg 🔨	1	0	0	0	0	1	1	0	3
