= Stockholm Ladies Curling Cup =

Annual curling tournament

Stockholm Ladies Cup
- Established: 2005
- 2018 host city: Stockholm, Sweden
- 2018 arena: Danderyd Curling Arena
- Purse: 331,000 SEK
- 2018 champion: (Sweden) Anna Hasselborg

Current edition
- 2018 Stockholm Ladies Cup

The Stockholm Ladies Cup, or the Stockholm Ladies Curling Cup is an annual bonspiel, or curling tournament, that takes place at the Danderyd Curling Arena in Stockholm, Sweden. The tournament is held in a round robin with straight playoff format. This change was made in 2014 from a triple-knockout format. The tournament was started in 2005 and became a Curling Champions Tour event, now part of the World Curling Tour.

== Past champions ==
Only skip's name is displayed.

Year	Winning team	Runner up team	Purse (SEK)
2005	(Scotland) Rhona Martin	(Norway) Dordi Nordby	
2006	(Scotland) Rhona Martin	(Sweden) Anette Norberg	
2007	(Sweden) Anette Norberg	(Sweden) Anna Hasselborg	
2008	(Sweden) Stina Viktorsson	(Switzerland) Binia Feltscher-Beeli	50,500
2009	(Sweden) Karin Rudström	(Russia) Anna Sidorova	
2010	(Switzerland) Mirjam Ott	(Sweden) Anna Hasselborg	75,750
2011	(Russia) Liudmila Privivkova	(Sweden) Anna Hasselborg	75,750
2012	(Sweden) Anette Norberg	(Sweden) Anna Hasselborg	120,000
2013	(Switzerland) Silvana Tirinzoni	(Switzerland) Michèle Jäggi	200,000
2014	(Sweden) Margaretha Sigfridsson	(Canada) Rachel Homan	250,000
2015	(Canada) Rachel Homan	(Scotland) Eve Muirhead	270,000
2016	(Sweden) Anna Hasselborg	(Scotland) Hannah Fleming	270,000
2017	(Switzerland) Alina Pätz	(South Korea) Kim Eun-jung	331,000
2018	(Sweden) Anna Hasselborg	(Russia) Anna Sidorova	331,000
