= Kristine Davanger =

Norwegian curler

- Curler
- Born: 13 January 1993 (age 33)

Curling career
- Member Association: Norway
- World Championship: 1 (2015)
- European Championship: 4 (2012, 2014, 2015, 2016)

Kristine Davanger (born 13 January 1993) is a Norwegian curler. She is daughter of curler Flemming Davanger. She competed at the 2015 World Women's Curling Championship in Sapporo, Japan. She also took part in the 2012 and 2014 European Curling Championships.
