= Karin Rudström =

Swedish curler

- Curler ♀
- Born: 2 July 1988 (age 38); Härnösand, Sweden

Team
- Curling club: IK Fyris, Uppsala

Curling career
- Member Association: Sweden
- World Championship: 1 (2011)
- European Championship: 1 (2014)
- Other appearances: Winter Universiade: 1 (2013)
Medal record
Curling
World Championships
Gold medal – first place	2011 Esbjerg
Swedish Women's Championship
Gold medal – first place	2014
Bronze medal – third place	2013

Karin Rudström (born 2 July 1988 in Härnösand) is a Swedish curler from Stockholm.

She is a 2011 World champion and a Swedish women's champion.

== Teams ==
=== Women's ===
Season	Skip	Third	Second	Lead	Alternate	Coach	Events
2006–07	Karin Rudström	Maria Nilsson	Mikaela Tornqvist	Kristin Naslund			
2009–10	Emma Berg (fourth)	Karin Rudström (skip)	Elina Backman	Malin Ekholm			
2010–11	Karin Rudström	Elina Backman	Amalia Rudström	Towe Lundman			
2010–11	Anette Norberg	Cecilia Östlund	Sara Carlsson	Liselotta Lennartsson	Karin Rudström	Magnus Swartling	WCC 2011 (gold)
2012–13	Anna Hasselborg	Karin Rudström	Agnes Knochenhauer	Zandra Flyg		Björn Rudström	WUG 2013 (5th); SWCC 2013 (bronze)
2013–14	Anna Hasselborg	Karin Rudström	Agnes Knochenhauer	Zandra Flyg		Mikael Hasselborg	SWCC 2014 (gold)
2014–15	Anna Hasselborg	Agnes Knochenhauer	Karin Rudström	Zandra Flyg	Jonna McManus (ECC)	Mikael Hasselborg	ECC 2014 (5th); SWCC 2015 (5th)
2015–16	Jonna McManus (fourth)	Karin Rudström (skip)	Sofie Sidén	Anna Huhta			SWCC 2016 (7th)

=== Mixed ===
Season	Skip	Third	Second	Lead	Coach	Events
2013	Anna Hasselborg	Marcus Hasselborg	Kristian Lindström	Karin Rudström		SMxCC 2013 (6th)
2018–19	Niclas Johansson	Zandra Flyg	Max Bäck	Karin Rudström	Emma Berg	SMxCC 2019 (4th)

=== Mixed doubles ===
Season	Male	Female	Coach	Events
2014	Magnus Rudström	Karin Rudström	Björn Rudström	SMDCC 2014 (???th)
2016	? Rudström	Karin Rudström		SMDCC 2016 (17th)
2017	Rasmus Wranå	Karin Rudström		SMDCC 2017 (5th)

== Private life ==
Rudström is from family of curlers. Her father Björn and her uncle (Björn's brother) Håkan are World and European champions. Håkan's daughter Amalia played for Sweden at the 2012 Winter Youth Olympics.
