= Towe Lundman =

Swedish curler

- Curler ♀
- Born: 18 December 1992 (age 33); Uppsala

Team
- Curling club: IK Fyris, Uppsala

Curling career
- Member Association: Sweden
- Other appearances: European Mixed Championship: 1 (2013)
Medal record
Curling
Swedish Women's Championship
| Silver medal – second place | 2014 Umeå |
| Silver medal – second place | 2015 Örebro |

Towe Marianne Lundman (born 18 December 1992 in Uppsala) is a Swedish curler.

She is a 2013 Swedish mixed champion.

== Teams ==
=== Women's ===
| Season | Skip | Third | Second | Lead | Alternate | Coach | Events |
|---|---|---|---|---|---|---|---|
| 2010–11 | Karin Rudström | Elina Backman | Amalia Rudström | Towe Lundman | | | |
| 2011–12 | Paulina Stein | Towe Lundman | Elina Backman | Amalia Rudström | | | |
| 2012–13 | Towe Lundman | Amalia Rudström | Anna Gustafsson (SJCC); Elina Backman (SWCC) | Johanna Heldin | | Håkan Rudström, Mattias Åkerberg | SJCC 2013 (silver); SWCC 2013 (5th) |
| 2013–14 | Towe Lundman | Amalia Rudström | Anna Gustafsson | Johanna Heldin | | Håkan Rudström | SJCC 2014 (silver) |
| 2013–14 | Towe Lundman | Amalia Rudström | Anna Gustafsson | Elina Backman | Johanna Heldin | Håkan Rudström | SWCC 2014 (silver) |
| 2014–15 | Towe Lundman | Anna Gustafsson | Elina Backman | Johanna Heldin | | Mattias Åkerberg, Nils-Erik Heldin | SWCC 2015 (silver) |
| 2015–16 | Towe Lundman | Johanna Heldin | Anna Gustafsson | Elina Backman | Sofia Gustafsson | Mattias Åkerberg, Nils-Erik Heldin | SWCC 2016 (5th) |
| 2016–17 | Towe Lundman | Sarah Pengel | Johanna Heldin | Eva Heldin | | Nils-Erik Heldin | SWCC 2017 (6th) |

=== Mixed ===
| Season | Skip | Third | Second | Lead | Coach | Events |
|---|---|---|---|---|---|---|
| 2011–12 | Alexander Lindström | Towe Lundman | Christoffer Sundgren | Elin Näs | | SMxCC 2012 (bronze) |
| 2012–13 | Towe Lundman (fourth) | Gustav Eskilsson (skip) | Anna Gustafsson | Jesper Johansson | | SMxCC 2013 (gold) |
| 2013–14 | Towe Lundman (fourth) | Gustav Eskilsson (skip) | Anna Gustafsson | Jesper Johansson | Björn Lundman | EMxCC 2013 (7th) |

=== Mixed doubles ===
| Season | Male | Female | Events |
|---|---|---|---|
| 2016 | Gustav Eskilsson | Towe Lundman | SMDCC 2016 (5th) |

== Personal life ==
Towe Lundman is divorced. She has two children together with Jakob Lundman.

She graduated from Uppsala University.
