= Johanna Heldin =

Swedish curler (born 1994)

- Curler
- Born: 29 August 1994 (age 32); Uppsala, Sweden

Curling career
- Member Association: Sweden
- World Championship: 6 (2019, 2021, 2022, 2023, 2024, 2025)
- World Mixed Championship: 2 (2015, 2016)
- European Championship: 6 (2018, 2019, 2021, 2022, 2024, 2025)
- Olympic: 2 (2022, 2026)
Medal record
Women's Curling
Representing Sweden
Olympic Games
Gold medal – first place	2026 Milano Cortina	Team
Bronze medal – third place	2022 Beijing	Team
World Championships
Silver medal – second place	2019 Silkeborg
European Championships
Gold medal – first place	2018 Tallinn
Gold medal – first place	2019 Helsingborg
Gold medal – first place	2025 Lohja
Silver medal – second place	2021 Lillehammer
Silver medal – second place	2024 Lohja
World Mixed Championships
Silver medal – second place	2015 Bern
Silver medal – second place	2016 Kazan
Swedish Women's Championships
Gold medal – first place	2023 Karlstad
Silver medal – second place	2014 Umeå
Silver medal – second place	2015 Örebro
Silver medal – second place	2018 Skellefteå
Silver medal – second place	2020 Jönköping
Bronze medal – third place	2019 Jönköping
Bronze medal – third place	2025 Härnösand

Johanna Maria Heldin (born 29 August 1994) is a Swedish curler. She was the alternate on Team Anna Hasselborg. With the Hasselborg rink, she won the gold medal in women's curling at the 2026 Winter Olympics and bronze medal in women's curling at 2022 Winter Olympics.

Heldin was born in Gottsunda, Uppsala Municipality.

== Career ==
=== Juniors ===
Heldin played for Sweden at the 2012 Youth Olympics, throwing lead rocks for the team, which was skipped by Rasmus Wranå. The team finished fourth. She was paired with New Zealand's Luke Steele in the mixed doubles event and was eliminated in the round of 16.

Heldin played second for team Sweden at the 2015 World Junior Curling Championships, on a team skipped by Isabella Wranå. The team would finish fourth. She was invited to be Sweden's fifth player at the 2016 World Junior Curling Championships on a team skipped by Therese Westman. Heldin played in eight games, and the team finished in sixth place.

=== Mixed ===
Heldin played for Sweden at two World Mixed Curling Championships, winning the silver medal at both the 2015 and 2016 World Mixed Curling Championship. The teams were skipped by Rasmus Wranå and Kristian Lindström respectively.

== Personal life ==
Born in Uppsala, Heldin is employed as a "junior doctor". Prior to this, she was a medical student at Uppsala University. She is in a relationship with Kristian Lindström.

== Teams ==
Season	Skip	Third	Second	Lead
2012–13	Towe Lundman	Amalia Rudström	Anna Gustafsson	Johanna Heldin
2013–14	Towe Lundman	Amalia Rudström	Anna Gustafsson	Johanna Heldin
2014–15	Towe Lundman	Anna Gustafsson	Johanna Heldin	Elina Backman
2015–16	Towe Lundman	Johanna Heldin	Anna Gustafsson	Elina Backman
2016–17	Towe Lundman	Johanna Heldin	Sarah Pengel	Camilla Schnabel
2017–18	Anette Norberg	Therese Westman	Johanna Heldin	Tilde Vermelin
2018–19	Anette Norberg	Therese Westman	Johanna Heldin	Tilde Vermelin
