= 2017 Humpty's Champions Cup =

Grand Slam of Curling event

- Host city: Calgary, Alberta
- Arena: WinSport Arena, Canada Olympic Park, Calgary, AB
- Dates: April 25–30, 2017
- Men's winner: (Ontario) Brad Jacobs
- Curling club: Community First CC
- Skip: Brad Jacobs
- Third: Ryan Fry
- Second: E. J. Harnden
- Lead: Ryan Harnden
- Finalist: (Alberta) Kevin Koe
- Women's winner: (Ontario) Rachel Homan
- Curling club: Ottawa Curling Club
- Skip: Rachel Homan
- Third: Emma Miskew
- Second: Sarah Wilkes
- Lead: Lisa Weagle
- Finalist: (Sweden) Anna Hasselborg

The 2017 Humpty's Champions Cup is the final Grand Slam of curling event of the 2016–17 curling season.

== Men ==
=== Teams ===
The teams are listed as follows:

Skip	Third	Second	Lead	Locale
Greg Balsdon	Don Bowser	Jonathan Beuk	Scott Chadwick	Kingston, Ontario
Tom Brewster	Glen Muirhead	Ross Paterson	Hammy McMillan Jr.	Aberdeen, Scotland
Benoît Schwarz (fourth)	Claudio Pätz	Peter de Cruz (skip)	Valentin Tanner	Geneva, Switzerland
Niklas Edin	Oskar Eriksson	Rasmus Wrana	Christoffer Sundgren	Karlstad, Sweden
John Epping	Mathew Camm	Patrick Janssen	Tim March	Toronto, Ontario
Brad Gushue	Mark Nichols	Brett Gallant	Geoff Walker	St. John's, Newfoundland and Labrador
Grant Hardie	Blair Fraser	Dave Reid	Duncan Menzies	Dumfries, Scotland
Brad Jacobs	Ryan Fry	E. J. Harnden	Ryan Harnden	Sault Ste. Marie, Ontario
Kevin Koe	Marc Kennedy	Brent Laing	Ben Hebert	Calgary, Alberta
Steve Laycock	Kirk Muyres	Matt Dunstone	Dallan Muyres	Saskatoon, Saskatchewan
Mike McEwen	B. J. Neufeld	Matt Wozniak	Denni Neufeld	Winnipeg, Manitoba
Yusuke Morozumi	Tetsuro Shimizu	Tsuyoshi Yamaguchi	Kosuke Morozumi	Karuizawa, Japan
Jim Cotter	John Morris	Catlin Schneider (Note: Schneider replaced Rick Sawatsky, who was injured.)	Tyrel Griffith	Vernon, British Columbia
Braeden Moskowy (Note: Moskowy skipped Team Carruthers for skip Reid Carruthers, who was playing at the 2017 World Mixed Doubles Curling Championship.)	Derek Samagalski	Colin Hodgson	Craig Savill	Winnipeg, Manitoba
John Shuster	Tyler George	Korey Dropkin (Note: Dropkin replaced Matt Hamilton, who was playing at the 2017 World Mixed Doubles Curling Championship)	John Landsteiner	(United States) Duluth, Minnesota

=== Round-robin standings ===
Pool A	W	L	SO#
(Alberta) Kevin Koe	3	1	8
(Ontario) John Epping	2	2	4
(Sweden) Niklas Edin	2	2	6
(United States) John Shuster	2	2	10
(Ontario) Greg Balsdon	1	3	12

Pool B	W	L	SO#
(Newfoundland and Labrador) Brad Gushue	4	0	2
(Manitoba) Mike McEwen	3	1	9
(Saskatchewan) Steve Laycock	2	2	7
(Scotland) Tom Brewster	1	3	13
(Japan) Yusuke Morozumi	0	4	15

Pool C	W	L	SO#
(Switzerland) Peter de Cruz	3	1	1
(Ontario) Brad Jacobs	3	1	3
(British Columbia) John Morris	3	1	5
(Manitoba) Braeden Moskowy	1	3	11
(Scotland) Grant Hardie	0	4	14

=== Tiebreakers ===
Sheet B	1	2	3	4	5	6	7	8	Final
(Ontario) John Epping 🔨	1	2	1	0	1	0	X	X	5
(United States) John Shuster	0	0	0	0	0	1	X	X	1

Player percentages
(Ontario) Team Epping		(United States) Team Shuster	
Tim March	92%	John Landsteiner	92%
Patrick Janssen	100%	Korey Dropkin	65%
Mathew Camm	92%	Tyler George	69%
John Epping	86%	John Shuster	70%
Total	93%	Total	74%

Sheet D	1	2	3	4	5	6	7	8	Final
(Sweden) Niklas Edin 🔨	2	0	4	0	0	2	5	X	13
(Saskatchewan) Steve Laycock	0	2	0	3	0	0	0	X	5

Player percentages
(Sweden) Team Edin		(Saskatchewan) Team Laycock	
Christoffer Sundgren	95%	Dallan Muyres	87%
Rasmus Wrana	99%	Matt Dunstone	71%
Oskar Eriksson	86%	Kirk Muyres	90%
Niklas Edin	91%	Steve Laycock	70%
Total	93%	Total	79%

=== Playoffs ===
Quarterfinals
1	(Newfoundland and Labrador) Brad Gushue	5
8	(Sweden) Niklas Edin	8
4	(British Columbia) John Morris	2
5	(Alberta) Kevin Koe	7
2	(Switzerland) Peter de Cruz	3
7	(Ontario) John Epping	8
3	(Ontario) Brad Jacobs	9
6	(Manitoba) Mike McEwen	8

Semifinals
8	(Sweden) Niklas Edin	4
5	(Alberta) Kevin Koe	6
7	(Ontario) John Epping	5
3	(Ontario) Brad Jacobs	9

Final
5	(Alberta) Kevin Koe	2
3	(Ontario) Brad Jacobs	6

=== Quarterfinal ===
Sheet B	1	2	3	4	5	6	7	8	Final
(Newfoundland and Labrador) Brad Gushue 🔨	1	0	0	0	2	0	2	0	5
(Sweden) Niklas Edin	0	2	0	0	0	2	0	4	8

Player percentages
(Newfoundland and Labrador) Team Gushue		(Sweden) Team Edin	
Geoff Walker	87%	Christoffer Sundgren	97%
Brett Gallant	90%	Rasmus Wrana	87%
Mark Nichols	93%	Oskar Eriksson	88%
Brad Gushue	94%	Niklas Edin	98%
Total	91%	Total	92%

Sheet C	1	2	3	4	5	6	7	8	Final
(British Columbia) John Morris	1	0	1	0	0	1	0	X	3
(Alberta) Kevin Koe 🔨	0	3	0	2	1	0	1	X	7

Player percentages
(British Columbia) Team Morris		(Alberta) Team Koe	
Rick Sawatsky	86%	Ben Hebert	80%
Tyrel Griffith	86%	Brent Laing	69%
John Morris	70%	Marc Kennedy	100%
Jim Cotter	81%	Kevin Koe	85%
Total	81%	Total	84%

Sheet D	1	2	3	4	5	6	7	8	Final
(Switzerland) Peter de Cruz 🔨	1	0	0	0	2	0	0	X	3
(Ontario) John Epping	0	1	1	0	0	3	3	X	8

Player percentages
(Switzerland) Team de Cruz		(Ontario) Team Epping	
Valentin Tanner	89%	Tim March	90%
Peter de Cruz	75%	Patrick Janssen	66%
Claudio Pätz	76%	Mathew Camm	95%
Benoit Schwarz	60%	John Epping	74%
Total	75%	Total	81%

Sheet E	1	2	3	4	5	6	7	8	Final
(Ontario) Brad Jacobs 🔨	2	0	1	0	5	0	0	1	9
(Manitoba) Mike McEwen	0	1	0	3	0	2	2	0	8

Player percentages
(Ontario) Team Jacobs		(Manitoba) Team McEwen	
Ryan Harnden	86%	Denni Neufeld	99%
E. J. Harnden	86%	Matt Wozniak	76%
Ryan Fry	90%	B.J. Neufeld	82%
Brad Jacobs	77%	Mike McEwen	77%
Total	85%	Total	83%

=== Semifinal ===
Sheet B	1	2	3	4	5	6	7	8	Final
(Sweden) Niklas Edin	0	0	2	1	0	0	1	0	4
(Alberta) Kevin Koe 🔨	2	0	0	0	0	1	0	3	6

Player percentages
(Sweden) Team Edin		(Alberta) Team Koe	
Christoffer Sundgren	84%	Ben Hebert	97%
Rasmus Wrana	90%	Brent Laing	85%
Oskar Eriksson	96%	Marc Kennedy	82%
Niklas Edin	96%	Kevin Koe	84%
Total	91%	Total	87%

Sheet D	1	2	3	4	5	6	7	8	Final
(Ontario) John Epping	2	0	2	0	1	0	0	X	5
(Ontario) Brad Jacobs 🔨	0	2	0	2	0	3	2	X	9

Player percentages
(Ontario) Team Epping		(Ontario) Team Jacobs	
Tim March	91%	Ryan Harnden	74%
Patrick Janssen	76%	E. J. Harnden	79%
Mathew Camm	99%	Ryan Fry	73%
John Epping	77%	Brad Jacobs	97%
Total	86%	Total	81%

=== Final ===
Sheet C	1	2	3	4	5	6	7	8	Final
(Alberta) Kevin Koe	0	0	2	0	0	0	0	X	2
(Ontario) Brad Jacobs 🔨	0	2	0	2	1	0	1	X	6

Player percentages
(Alberta) Team Koe		(Ontario) Team Jacobs	
Ben Hebert	91%	Ryan Harnden	98%
Brent Laing	92%	E. J. Harnden	72%
Marc Kennedy	79%	Ryan Fry	67%
Kevin Koe	65%	Brad Jacobs	87%
Total	82%	Total	81%

== Women ==
=== Teams ===
The teams are listed as follows:

Skip	Third	Second	Lead	Locale
Anna Hasselborg	Sara McManus	Agnes Knochenhauer	Sofia Mabergs	Sundbyberg, Sweden
Kerri Einarson	Selena Kaatz	Jennifer Clark-Rouire (Note: Clark-Rouire replaced Liz Fyfe.)	Kristin MacCuish	Winnipeg, Manitoba
Isabella Wranå	Jennie Wahlin	Almida de Val	Fanny Sjöberg	Stockholm, Sweden
Allison Flaxey	Clancy Grandy	Lynn Kreviazuk	Morgan Court	Caledon, Ontario
Jamie Sinclair	Alex Carlson	Vicky Persinger	Monica Walker	(United States) Blaine, Minnesota
Jacqueline Harrison	Janet Murphy	Stephanie Matheson	Melissa Foster	Mississauga, Ontario
Rachel Homan	Emma Miskew	Sarah Wilkes (Note: Wilkes replaced Joanne Courtney, who was playing at the 2017 World Mixed Doubles Curling Championship.)	Lisa Weagle	Ottawa, Ontario
Jennifer Jones	Kaitlyn Lawes	Jill Officer	Dawn McEwen	Winnipeg, Manitoba
Victoria Moiseeva	Uliana Vasilyeva	Galina Arsenkina	Julia Guzieva	Kaliningrad, Russia
Eve Muirhead	Anna Sloan	Vicki Adams	Lauren Gray	Stirling, Scotland
Alina Paetz	Nadine Lehmann	Marisa Winkelhausen	Nicole Schwägli	Zürich, Switzerland
Casey Scheidegger	Cary-Anne McTaggart	Jessie Scheidegger	Kristie Moore	Lethbridge, Alberta
Val Sweeting	Lori Olson-Johns	Dana Ferguson	Rachelle Brown	Edmonton, Alberta
Silvana Tirinzoni	Cathy Overton-Clapham (Note: Overton-Clapham replaced Manuela Siegrist, who was injured.)	Esther Neuenschwander	Marlene Albrecht	Aarau, Switzerland
Wang Bingyu	Zhou Yan	Liu Jinli	Ma Jingyi (Note: Ma replaced Wang Rui, who was playing at the 2017 World Mixed Doubles Curling Championship.)	Harbin, China

=== Round-robin standings ===
Pool A	W	L	SO#
(Alberta) Val Sweeting	3	1	5
(Ontario) Rachel Homan	3	1	7
(Manitoba) Kerri Einarson	2	2	11
(Alberta) Casey Scheidegger	1	3	3
(Russia) Victoria Moiseeva	1	3	13

Pool B	W	L	SO#
(Switzerland) Alina Pätz	4	0	9
(Manitoba) Jennifer Jones	3	1	6
(Ontario) Allison Flaxey	1	3	1
(Scotland) Eve Muirhead	1	3	12
(Sweden) Isabella Wranå	1	3	14

Pool C	W	L	SO#
(Switzerland) Silvana Tirinzoni	3	1	2
(Sweden) Anna Hasselborg	3	1	10
(Ontario) Jacqueline Harrison	2	2	4
(United States) Jamie Sinclair	2	2	8
(China) Wang Bingyu	0	4	15

=== Tiebreaker ===
Sheet B	1	2	3	4	5	6	7	8	Final
(United States) Jamie Sinclair 🔨	1	0	0	2	0	2	0	2	7
(Manitoba) Kerri Einarson	0	3	1	0	1	0	1	0	6

Player percentages
(United States) Team Sinclair		(Manitoba) Team Einarson	
Monica Walker	80%	Kristin MacCuish	97%
Vicky Persinger	77%	Jennifer Clark-Rouire	92%
Alexandra Carlson	86%	Selena Kaatz	83%
Jamie Sinclair	90%	Kerri Einarson	80%
Total	83%	Total	88%

=== Playoffs ===
Quarterfinals
1	(Switzerland) Alina Pätz	5
8	(United States) Jamie Sinclair	4
4	(Manitoba) Jennifer Jones	5
5	(Ontario) Rachel Homan	9
2	(Switzerland) Silvana Tirinzoni	4
7	(Ontario) Jacqueline Harrison	9
3	(Alberta) Val Sweeting	4
6	(Sweden) Anna Hasselborg	5

Semifinals
1	(Switzerland) Alina Pätz	0
5	(Ontario) Rachel Homan	5
7	(Ontario) Jacqueline Harrison	2
6	(Sweden) Anna Hasselborg	7

Final
5	(Ontario) Rachel Homan	5
6	(Sweden) Anna Hasselborg	4

=== Quarterfinal ===
Sheet B	1	2	3	4	5	6	7	8	Final
(Switzerland) Alina Pätz 🔨	1	0	1	0	2	0	0	1	5
(United States) Jamie Sinclair	0	1	0	1	0	1	1	0	4

Player percentages
(Switzerland) Team Pätz		(United States) Team Sinclair	
Nicole Schwägli	78%	Monica Walker	93%
Marisa Winkelhausen	81%	Vicky Persinger	87%
Nadine Lehmann	85%	Alexandra Carlson	66%
Alina Pätz	77%	Jamie Sinclair	81%
Total	80%	Total	82%

Sheet C	1	2	3	4	5	6	7	8	Final
(Manitoba) Jennifer Jones	0	0	3	0	0	2	0	X	5
(Ontario) Rachel Homan 🔨	0	2	0	3	1	0	3	X	9

Player percentages
(Manitoba) Team Jones		(Ontario) Team Homan	
Dawn McEwen	100%	Lisa Weagle	89%
Jill Officer	76%	Sarah Wilkes	90%
Kaitlyn Lawes	86%	Emma Miskew	87%
Jennifer Jones	79%	Rachel Homan	83%
Total	86%	Total	87%

Sheet D	1	2	3	4	5	6	7	8	Final
(Switzerland) Silvana Tirinzoni 🔨	1	2	0	2	0	0	0	X	4
(Ontario) Jacqueline Harrison	1	0	2	0	0	5	1	X	9

Player percentages
(Switzerland) Team Tirinzoni		(Ontario) Team Harrison	
Marlene Albrecht	96%	Melissa Foster	85%
Esther Neuenschwander	72%	Stephanie Matheson	74%
Cathy Overton-Clapham	67%	Janet Murphy	68%
Silvana Tirinzoni	60%	Jacqueline Harrison	79%
Total	74%	Total	76%

Sheet E	1	2	3	4	5	6	7	8	Final
(Alberta) Val Sweeting	0	0	1	0	2	0	1	0	4
(Sweden) Anna Hasselborg 🔨	0	2	0	2	0	1	0	0	5

Player percentages
(Alberta) Team Sweeting		(Sweden) Team Hasselborg	
Rachelle Brown	90%	Sofia Mabergs	69%
Dana Ferguson	77%	Agnes Knochenhauer	91%
Lori Olson-Johns	73%	Sara McManus	85%
Val Sweeting	88%	Anna Hasselborg	95%
Total	82%	Total	85%

=== Semifinal ===
Sheet C	1	2	3	4	5	6	7	8	Final
(Switzerland) Alina Pätz 🔨	0	0	0	0	0	0	0	X	0
(Ontario) Rachel Homan	0	0	1	1	1	1	1	X	5

Player percentages
(Switzerland) Team Pätz		(Ontario) Team Homan	
Nicole Schwägli	80%	Lisa Weagle	96%
Marisa Winkelhausen	96%	Sarah Wilkes	89%
Nadine Lehmann	75%	Emma Miskew	88%
Alina Pätz	47%	Rachel Homan	87%
Total	75%	Total	90%

Sheet E	1	2	3	4	5	6	7	8	Final
(Ontario) Jacqueline Harrison	0	0	1	0	0	1	0	X	2
(Sweden) Anna Hasselborg 🔨	1	3	0	1	1	0	1	X	7

Player percentages
(Ontario) Team Harrison		(Sweden) Team Hasselborg	
Melissa Foster	89%	Sofia Mabergs	84%
Stephanie Matheson	64%	Agnes Knochenhauer	73%
Janet Murphy	76%	Sara McManus	89%
Jacqueline Harrison	70%	Anna Hasselborg	90%
Total	75%	Total	84%

=== Final ===
Sheet C	1	2	3	4	5	6	7	8	Final
(Ontario) Rachel Homan	1	0	0	0	1	1	0	2	5
(Sweden) Anna Hasselborg 🔨	0	1	0	1	0	0	2	0	4

Player percentages
(Ontario) Team Homan		(Sweden) Team Hasselborg	
Lisa Weagle	88%	Sofia Mabergs	63%
Sarah Wilkes	86%	Agnes Knochenhauer	79%
Emma Miskew	66%	Sara McManus	65%
Rachel Homan	70%	Anna Hasselborg	55%
Total	77%	Total	66%

== Qualification ==
=== Men ===
Qualification method (Note: World Curling Tour (WCT) events shown are the 7 highest ranked that have winners not qualified through other routes.)	Qualifying team	Scenario if team has already qualified	Notes
Defending Champion 2016 Humpty's Champions Cup	(Manitoba) Reid Carruthers		Carruthers playing in 2017 World Mixed Doubles Curling Championship; team will be skipped by Braeden Moskowy
Winner of 2016 GSOC Tour Challenge	(Sweden) Niklas Edin	None (first qualifier)	..
Winner of 2016 GSOC The Masters	(Sweden) Niklas Edin	WCT #5 Event Winner (not already qualified)	
Winner of 2016 GSOC The National	(Ontario) Brad Jacobs	None (first qualifier)	..
Winner of 2016 European Championship	(Sweden) Niklas Edin	WCT #6 Event Winner (not already qualified)	
Winner of 2016 Asia/Pacific Championship	(Japan) Yusuke Morozumi	None (first qualifier)	
Winner of 2017 GSOC Canadian Open	(Newfoundland and Labrador) Brad Gushue	None (first qualifier)	
Winner of 2017 U.S. National Championship	(United States) John Shuster	None (first qualifier)	
Winner of 2017 World Junior Championship	~~(South Korea) Lee Ki-jeong~~	None (first qualifier)	
Winner of 2017 Tim Hortons Brier	(Newfoundland and Labrador) Brad Gushue		
Winner of 2017 GSOC The Elite 10	(British Columbia) John Morris		
Winner of 2017 World Championship	(Newfoundland and Labrador) Brad Gushue	Already qualified	
Winner of 2017 GSOC The Players' Championship	(Sweden) Niklas Edin	Already qualified	
WCT #1 - Winner of 2016-17 Ranked Event	(Alberta) Kevin Koe	None (first qualifier)	AMJ Campbell Shorty Jenkins Classic
WCT #2 - Winner of 2016-17 Ranked Event	(Manitoba) Reid Carruthers	Already qualified	Canad Inns Prairie Classic
WCT #3 - Winner of 2016-17 Ranked Event	(Ontario) Brad Jacobs	Already qualified	College Clean Restoration Curling Classic
WCT #4 - Winner of 2016-17 Ranked Event	(Sweden) Niklas Edin	Already qualified	Stu Sells Oakville Tankard
WCT #5 - Winner of 2016-17 Ranked Event	(Saskatchewan) Steve Laycock	None (first qualifier)	Direct Horizontal Drilling Fall Classic
WCT #6 - Winner of 2016-17 Ranked Event	(Newfoundland and Labrador) Brad Gushue	Already qualified	Stu Sells Toronto Tankard
WCT #7 - Winner of 2016-17 Ranked Event	(Sweden) Niklas Edin	Already qualified	Swiss Cup Basel
WCT #8 - Winner of 2016-17 Ranked Event	(Switzerland) Peter de Cruz	None (first qualifier)	Baden Masters
WCT #9 - Winner of 2016-17 Ranked Event	(Ontario) John Epping	None (first qualifier)	Challenge de Curling de Gatineau
WCT #10 - Winner of 2016-17 Ranked Event	(Ontario) Greg Balsdon	None (first qualifier)	GSOC Tour Challenge Tier 2
WCT #11 - Winner of 2016-17 Ranked Event	(Manitoba) Mike McEwen	None (first qualifier)	DeKalb Superspiel
WCT #12 - Winner of 2016-17 Ranked Event	(Alberta) Kevin Koe	Already qualified	Red Deer Curling Classic
WCT #13 - Winner of 2016-17 Ranked Event	(Norway) ~~Steffen Walstad~~	None (first qualifier)	German Masters
WCT #14 - Winner of 2016-17 Ranked Event	(Scotland) Grant Hardie	None (first qualifier)	Aberdeen International Curling Championship
WCT #15 - Winner of 2016-17 Ranked Event	(Ontario) John Epping	Already qualified	CookstownCash presented by Comco Canada Inc
WCT #16 - Winner of 2016-17 Ranked Event	(Manitoba) Mike McEwen	Already qualified	Ed Werenich Golden Wrench Classic
WCT #17 - Winner of 2016-17 Ranked Event	(Scotland) Tom Brewster	None (first qualifier)	Mercure Perth Masters

=== Women ===
Qualification method	Qualifying team	Scenario if team has already qualified	Notes
Defending Champion 2016 Humpty's Champions Cup	(Manitoba) Jennifer Jones		
Winner of 2016 GSOC Tour Challenge	(Alberta) Val Sweeting	None (first qualifier)	..
Winner of 2016 GSOC The Masters	(Ontario) Allison Flaxey	None (first qualifier)	..
Winner of 2016 Asia/Pacific Championship	~~(South Korea) Kim Eun-jung~~	None (first qualifier)	
Winner of 2016 GSOC The National	(Manitoba) Kerri Einarson	None (first qualifier)	
Winner of 2016 European Championship	(Russia) Victoria Moiseeva	None (first qualifier)	
Winner of 2017 GSOC The Canadian Open	(Alberta) Casey Scheidegger	None (first qualifier)	
Winner of 2017 U.S. National Championship	(United States) Jamie Sinclair	None (first qualifier)	
Winner of 2017 Scotties Tournament of Hearts	(Ontario) Rachel Homan	None (first qualifier)	
Winner of 2017 World Junior Championship	(Sweden) Isabella Wranå	None (first qualifier)	
Winner of 2017 World Championship	(Ontario) Rachel Homan	Already qualified	
Winner of 2017 GSOC The Players' Championship	(Manitoba) Jennifer Jones	Already qualified	
WCT #1 - Winner of 2016-17 Ranked Event	(Ontario) Rachel Homan	Already qualified	Canad Inns Women's Classic
WCT #2 - Winner of 2016-17 Ranked Event	(China) Wang Bingyu	None (first qualifier)	Colonial Square Ladies Classic
WCT #3 - Winner of 2016-17 Ranked Event	(Alberta) Casey Scheidegger	Already qualified	Curlers Corner Autumn Gold Curling Classic
WCT #4 - Winner of 2016-17 Ranked Event	(Sweden) Anna Hasselborg	None (first qualifier)	Stockholm Ladies Curling Cup
WCT #5 - Winner of 2016-17 Ranked Event	(Scotland) Eve Muirhead	None (first qualifier)	Women's Masters Basel
WCT #6 - Winner of 2016-17 Ranked Event	(British Columbia) ~~Marla Mallett~~	None (first qualifier)	Prestige Hotels & Resorts Curling Classic
WCT #7 - Winner of 2016-17 Ranked Event	(Switzerland) Silvana Tirinzoni	None (first qualifier)	Stu Sells Oakville Tankard
WCT #8 - Winner of 2016-17 Ranked Event	(Alberta) Casey Scheidegger	Already qualified	HDF Insurance Shoot-Out
WCT #9 - Winner of 2016-17 Ranked Event	(Manitoba) Jennifer Jones	Already qualified	DeKalb Superspiel
WCT #10 - Winner of 2016-17 Ranked Event	(Ontario) Jacqueline Harrison	None (first qualifier)	GSOC Tour Challenge Tier 2
WCT #11 - Winner of 2016-17 Ranked Event	(Ontario) Allison Flaxey	Already qualified	City of Perth Ladies International
WCT #12 - Winner of 2016-17 Ranked Event	(Ontario) Rachel Homan	Already qualified	AMJ Campbell Shorty Jenkins Classic
WCT #13 - Winner of 2016-17 Ranked Event	(Switzerland) Alina Pätz	None (first qualifier)	International Bernese Ladies Cup
