= Sofia Scharback =

Swedish curler (born 1993)

- Curler
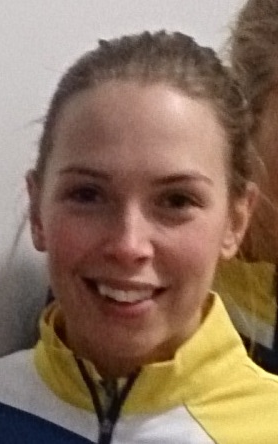
- Born: Sofia Mabergs; 9 April 1993 (age 33); Malung, Sweden

Team
- Curling club: Sundbybergs CK, Sundbyberg, SWE
- Skip: Anna Hasselborg
- Third: Sara McManus
- Second: Agnes Knochenhauer
- Lead: Sofia Scharback

Curling career
- Member Association: Sweden
- World Championship: 9 (2015, 2017, 2018, 2019, 2021, 2022, 2023, 2024, 2025)
- European Championship: 8 (2016, 2017, 2018, 2019, 2021, 2022, 2024, 2025)
- Olympic: 3 (2018, 2022, 2026)
- Grand Slam victories: 8 (2018 Elite 10 (Sept.), 2018 Masters, 2019 Tour Challenge, 2019 National, 2020 Canadian Open, 2021 National, 2022 Players', 2025 Masters)
Medal record
Women's curling
Representing Sweden
Olympic Games
Gold medal – first place	2018 Pyeongchang	Team
Gold medal – first place	2026 Milano Cortina	Team
Bronze medal – third place	2022 Beijing	Team
World Championships
Silver medal – second place	2018 North Bay
Silver medal – second place	2019 Silkeborg
European Championships
Gold medal – first place	2018 Tallinn
Gold medal – first place	2019 Helsingborg
Gold medal – first place	2025 Lohja
Silver medal – second place	2016 Renfrewshire
Silver medal – second place	2017 St Gallen
Silver medal – second place	2021 Lillehammer
Silver medal – second place	2024 Lohja
European Mixed Championships
Gold medal – first place	2014 Copenhagen

Sofia Scharback (born Bygg Ida Sofia Mabergs; 9 April 1993) is a Swedish curler from Gävle. She currently plays lead on Team Anna Hasselborg. With the Hasselborg rink, she won the gold medal in women's curling at the 2018 and 2026 Winter Olympics.

== Career ==
=== Juniors ===
Scharback played lead on the Swedish junior women's team at the 2011 and 2012 World Junior Curling Championships, on teams skipped by Jonna McManus and Sara McManus respectively. At both events, Sweden placed fourth. Scharback played third on the Swedish team, skipped by Sara McManus, at the 2013 World Junior Curling Championships. That team would place fifth. Scharback played lead for the University of Gävle team representing Sweden (and again, skipped by Sara McManus) at the 2015 Winter Universiade. There, the team finished fourth.

=== Mixed ===
Scharback played lead for Sweden at the 2014 European Mixed Curling Championship on a team skipped by her brother Patric. After posting a 6–2 record in their group, the team would win three straight playoff games to claim the gold medal.

=== Women's ===
Scharback was the alternate on the Swedish team (skipped by Margaretha Sigfridsson) at the 2015 World Women's Curling Championship. Scharback did not play any games, and the team finished 7th. Scharback joined the Anna Hasselborg rink in the off-season. The team would go on to win a silver medal at the 2016 European Curling Championships and represented Sweden at the 2017 World Women's Curling Championship, where they finished fourth.

In February 2018, her team of Anna Hasselborg, Sara McManus, and Agnes Knochenhauer won the gold medal at the 2018 Winter Olympics in PyeongChang, defeating Kim Eun-jung in the final. The next month, the rink made it to the final of the 2018 World Women's Curling Championship, but they lost in an extra end to Canada's Jennifer Jones.

Scharback won her first Grand Slam in the inaugural women's Elite 10 in 2018, going undefeated through the tournament and defeating Silvana Tirinzoni in the final. At the 2018 Masters, the Hasselborg rink won their second straight slam, defeating Rachel Homan in the final. The team lost the world final once again at the 2019 World Women's Curling Championship, this time to Silvana Tirinzoni.

Team Hasselborg began the 2019–20 season at the Stu Sells Oakville Tankard, where they defeated Anna Sidorova in the final. They missed the playoffs at the 2019 AMJ Campbell Shorty Jenkins Classic after going 2–2 in the round robin. They defended their title at the 2019 European Curling Championships. Down 4–3 in the tenth end of the final to Scotland's Eve Muirhead, Hasselborg made a runback on her final stone to score two and win. In Grand Slam play, Team Hasselborg were the most dominant team on the women's side, winning them the 2019–20 Pinty's Cup. They lost in the semifinal of the Masters to Tracy Fleury before winning the next three Slams, the Tour Challenge, National and the Canadian Open. The team was set to represent Sweden at the 2020 World Women's Curling Championship before the event got cancelled due to the COVID-19 pandemic. The Canadian Open would be their last event of the season as both the Players' Championship and the Champions Cup Grand Slam events were also cancelled due to the pandemic.

The Hasselborg rink won the first event of the 2020–21 season, defeating Raphaela Keiser in the final of the 2020 Women's Masters Basel. Next, they played Team Wranå in the Sweden National Challenge in December 2020, where they lost 17–12. A "curling bubble" was set up in Calgary, Canada in the spring, which hosted several events, including the 2021 World Women's Curling Championship and two slams. Team Hasselborg competed in both the 2021 Champions Cup and the 2021 Players' Championship, finishing 0–4 at the Champions Cup and reaching the semifinals of the Players'. The following week, the team represented Sweden at the Worlds. They finished third through the round robin with a 10–3 record, qualifying them for the playoffs. After defeating Canada's Kerri Einarson 8–3 in the qualification round, they lost a narrow 8–7 semifinal against the RCF, skipped by Alina Kovaleva. This put them in the bronze medal game, which they lost 9–5 to the Tabitha Peterson rink of the United States. On 4 June 2021 Team Hasselborg was selected as the Olympic Team for the 2022 Winter Olympics.

Team Hasselborg began the 2021–22 season competing in the men's Baden Masters tour event, where they missed the playoffs. At the 2021 Women's Masters Basel, the team made it all the way to the final, where they lost to Denmark's Madeleine Dupont. Next, they played in the 2021 Masters Grand Slam event, where they again missed the playoffs. They were able to rebound at the 2021 National, however, claiming the title with a 9–6 victory over Tracy Fleury in the final game. In November, Team Hasselborg again represented Sweden at the 2021 European Curling Championships where they finished third in the round robin with a 7–2 record. They then defeated Russia's Alina Kovaleva in the semifinal before dropping the final to Scotland's Eve Muirhead, settling for silver. The next event for Team Hasselborg was the 2022 Winter Olympics, where they attempted to defend their gold medal from 2018. The team placed second after the round robin preliminary stage with a 7–2 record. This earned them a semifinal berth where they would face Great Britain's Muirhead rink. In one of the highest-scoring games in curling, Muirhead scored a single point in the extra end to win 12–11, ending Hasselborg's chances of repeating as Olympic gold medallists. They did still earn a medal from the Games, however, as they were able to beat Switzerland's Silvana Tirinzoni rink 9–7 in the bronze medal game. Next for the Swedish rink was the 2022 World Women's Curling Championship, where they finished fourth in the round robin with a 9–3 record. They then defeated the United States Cory Christensen in the qualification game before dropping the semifinal and bronze medal games to Switzerland and Canada, respectively, placing fourth. Team Hasselborg wrapped up their season at the final two Slams of the season, the 2022 Players' Championship and the 2022 Champions Cup. At the Players', the team began with two straight losses before rattling off six straight victories to claim the event title. With the victory, Team Hasselborg became the first women's team to win a career Grand Slam (winning all four 'majors'). At the Champions Cup, they went undefeated up until the semifinal round where they were eliminated by Kerri Einarson.

In their first event of the 2022–23 season, Team Hasselborg won the 2022 Oslo Cup. After a 4–1 round robin record, the team knocked off Isabella Wranå in the semifinal and the newly formed Kaitlyn Lawes rink in the championship game. Next for the team was the European Qualifier best-of-seven series between them and Team Wranå. Team Hasselborg won the series 4–1, becoming the Swedish team for the 2022 European Curling Championships. In their first Slam of the season, the 2022 National, the team missed the playoffs with a 1–3 record, meaning they would not have the chance to repeat as champions for a third year in a row. They were able to qualify at the next Slam, the 2022 Tour Challenge, where they fell in the quarterfinals to Kerri Einarson. Back at home, the team claimed their second event title of the season after going undefeated to win the Sundbyberg Open. They played with three players, with Sara McManus out on maternity leave. At the European Championship, the team's alternate Johanna Heldin stepped in at lead, shifting Scharback to second and Knochenhauer to third. The team went 5–4 through the round robin, missing the playoffs for the first time since 2015. Back on the Slam tour, Team Hasselborg lost 5–2 to Rachel Homan in the quarterfinals of the 2022 Masters. They also lost in the quarterfinals of the 2023 Canadian Open, 8–7 to Satsuki Fujisawa. In February, the team won the Swedish Women's Curling Championship and the Swedish World Qualifier over Team Wranå, qualifying for the World Championship. In their final event before the Worlds, the team lost in the final of the Sun City Cup to Marianne Rørvik. At the 2023 World Women's Curling Championship, which was held in Sandviken, the team finished fifth through the round robin with a 7–5 record, enough to make the playoffs. After defeating Italy in the qualification game, they once again lost both the semifinal and the bronze medal game to Switzerland and Canada to finish fourth. The team finished their season at the 2023 Players' Championship and the 2023 Champions Cup. After missing the playoffs at the Players', the team made it to the quarterfinals of the Champions Cup where they lost 7–6 to Team Homan.

Back together for the 2023–24 season, Team Hasselborg defended their title at the 2023 Oslo Cup, stealing the victory against Marianne Rørvik. They then made a second straight final at the 2023 Women's Masters Basel before falling short to Silvana Tirinzoni. At the best-of-seven European qualifier against Isabella Wranå, the team lost the series 4–2, meaning they would not represent Sweden for the first time since 2015. Back on tour, the team rebounded immediately by winning the 2023 Players Open, downing Team Wranå in the final. At the first Slam of the season, the 2023 Tour Challenge, the team went unbeaten until the semifinals where they were stopped by Jennifer Jones. They also reached the semifinals of the 2023 National before losing to Rachel Homan. After missing the playoffs at the 2023 Western Showdown, the team had back-to-back quarterfinal finishes at the 2023 Masters and the 2024 Canadian Open, losing out to Team Jones on both occasions. Days before the 2024 Swedish Women's Championship, Team Hasselborg was appointed to represent Sweden at the 2024 World Women's Curling Championship as they had accumulated more points than Team Wranå throughout the first part of the season. Still, the team went on to win the Swedish Championship. At the Worlds, Team Hasselborg started with three consecutive losses before turning things around, finishing the round robin in fifth place with a 7–5 record. They then lost to Korea's Gim Eun-ji in the qualification round, eliminating them from medal contention. The Hasselborg rink ended their season at the 2024 Players' Championship where after a 3–2 round robin record they lost in the quarterfinals to Gim.

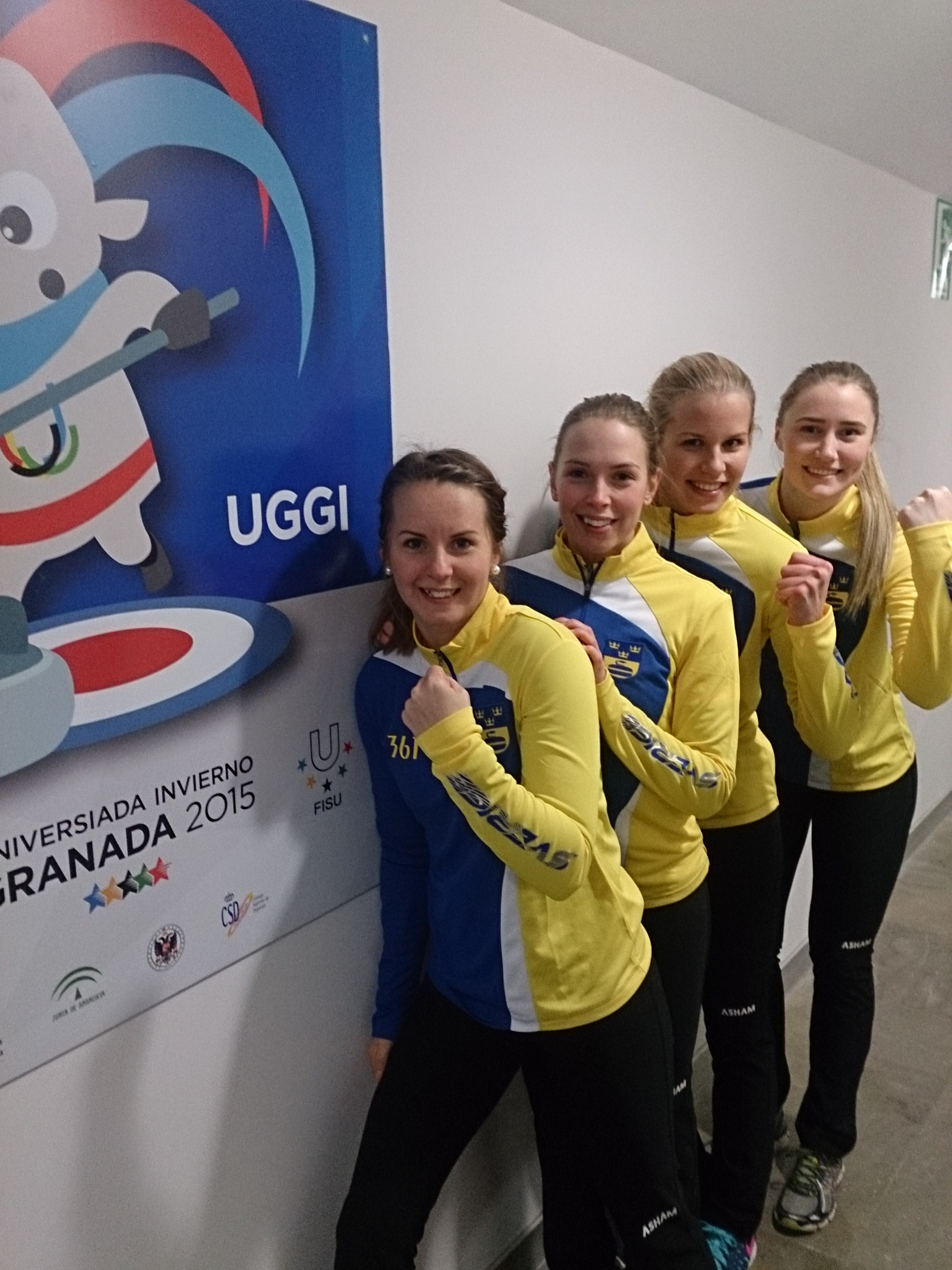
Anna Huhta, Scharback (second from left), Cecilia Östlund, and Sara McManus at the 2015 Winter Universiade

== Personal life ==
Scharback's older brother is Swedish curler Patric Mabergs. She is in a relationship with Canadian curler Brady Scharback.

== Grand Slam record ==
Key
C	Champion
F	Lost in Final
SF	Lost in Semifinal
QF	Lost in Quarterfinals
R16	Lost in the round of 16
Q	Did not advance to playoffs
T2	Played in Tier 2 event
DNP	Did not participate in event
N/A	Not a Grand Slam event that season

Event	2015–16	2016–17	2017–18	2018–19	2019–20	2020–21	2021–22	2022–23	2023–24	2024–25	2025–26	2026–27
Invitational	T2	SF	F	DNP	C	N/A	N/A	QF	SF	Q	SF	QF
Masters	DNP	SF	SF	C	SF	N/A	Q	QF	QF	C	QF	Q
National	Q	Q	DNP	QF	C	N/A	C	Q	SF	F	SF	QF
Open	DNP	SF	Q	Q	C	N/A	N/A	QF	QF	DNP	Q	
Players'	DNP	SF	QF	F	N/A	SF	C	Q	QF	SF	Q	
Champions Cup	DNP	F	QF	DNP	N/A	Q	SF	QF	N/A	N/A	N/A	N/A

=== Former events ===
Event	2018–19
Elite 10	C
