= Victoria Moiseeva =

Russian curler (born 1991)

- Curler ♀
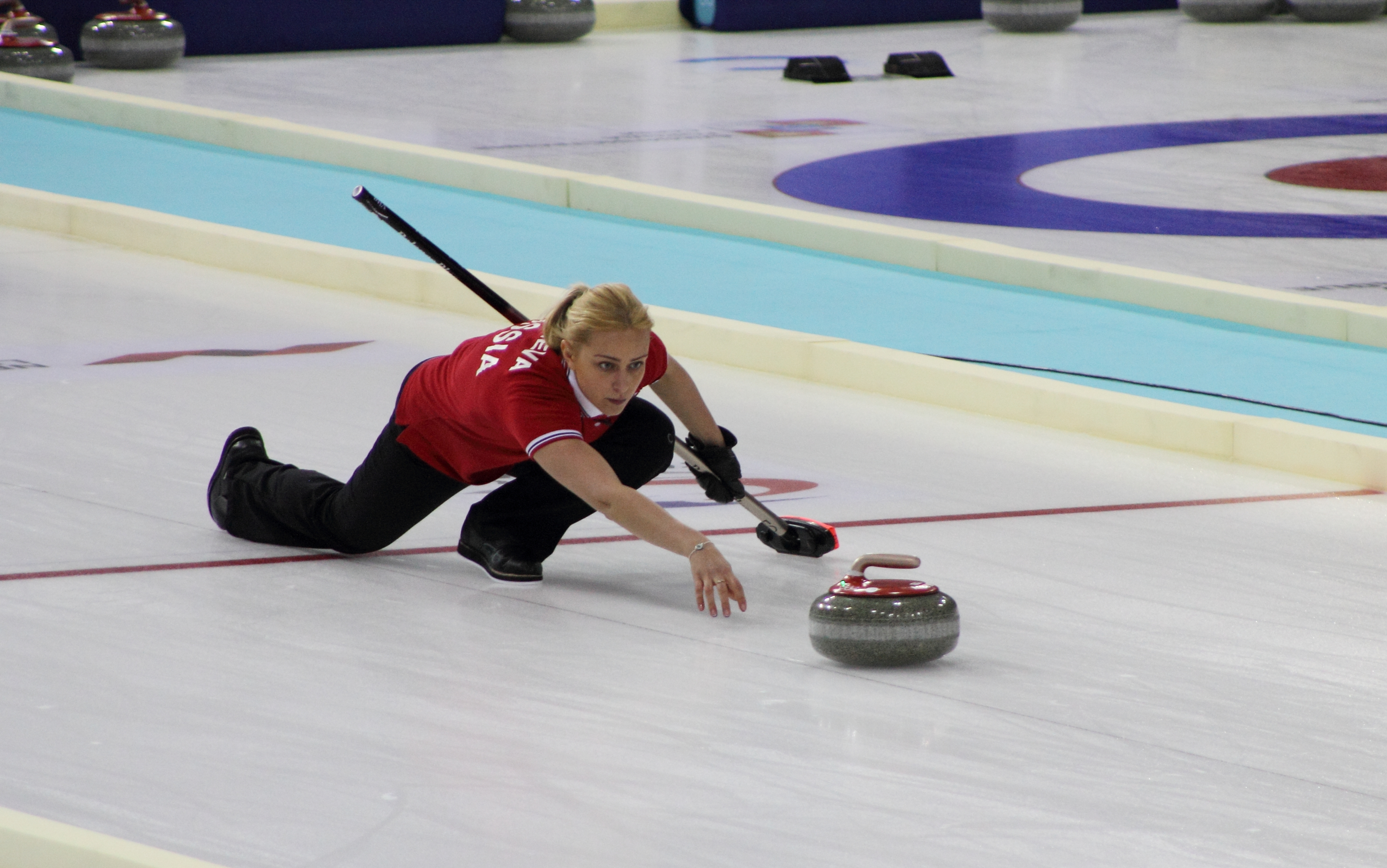
- Victoria Moiseeva at the 2015 World Mixed Doubles Curling Championship
- Other names: Viktoriia Moiseeva
- Born: Victoria Alexandrovna Moiseeva; 10 January 1991 (age 35); Miass, Chelyabinsk Oblast

Team
- Curling club: CC Adamant, St. Petersburg

Curling career
- Member Association: Russia
- World Championship: 1 (2018)
- European Championship: 1 (2016)
- Olympic: 1 (2018)
Medal record
Women's Curling
Representing Russia
World Curling Championships
| Bronze medal – third place | 2018 North Bay |
European Curling Championships
| Gold medal – first place | 2016 Renfrewshire |
Winter Universiade
| Gold medal – first place | 2013 Trentino | curling |
| Gold medal – first place | 2015 Granada | curling |
| Silver medal – second place | 2017 Almaty | curling |
World Junior Curling Championships
| Bronze medal – third place | 2011 Perth |
| Bronze medal – third place | 2012 Östersund |

Victoria Alexandrovna Moiseeva (Russian: Викто́рия Алекса́ндровна Моисе́ева; born 10 January 1991 in Miass) is a Russian curler. She won gold as an alternate of the Russian national women's team at the 2013 Winter Universiade and the 2015 Winter Universiade. She plays for CC Adamant (St. Petersburg).

She skipped the Russian national women's curling team at the 2016 European Curling Championships, and also skipped the Olympic Athletes from Russia team at the 2018 Winter Olympics.

== Awards ==
- 2018 Ford World Women's Curling Championship: Bronze (2018).
- European Curling Championships: Gold (2016).
- Curling at the Winter Universiade: Gold (2013, 2015).
- World Junior Curling Championships: Bronze (2011, 2012).

== Personal life ==
Moiseeva was born in Miass, Chelyabinsk Oblast, Russia. In her childhood she performed choreography of traditional and variety dances, but choose curling instead. She went to the Specialized Children's and Youth Sports School of Olympic Reserve "School of Highest Sports Mastership in Winter Disciplines" in St. Petersburg.

She finished the St. Petersburg State University of Telecommunications.

Moiseeva graduated from Lesgaft National State University of Physical Education, Sport and Health.

She announced an engagement with Danish curler Oliver Dupont in June 2017. They are planning to marry in June next year.

== Grand Slam record ==
Key
| C | Champion |
| F | Lost in Final |
| SF | Lost in Semifinal |
| QF | Lost in Quarterfinals |
| R16 | Lost in the round of 16 |
| Q | Did not advance to playoffs |
| T2 | Played in Tier 2 event |
| DNP | Did not participate in event |
| N/A | Not a Grand Slam event that season |

| Event | 2016–17 | 2017–18 | 2018–19 | 2019–20 |
|---|---|---|---|---|
| Masters | DNP | DNP | DNP | DNP |
| Tour Challenge | DNP | DNP | DNP | DNP |
| The National | DNP | DNP | DNP | DNP |
| Canadian Open | DNP | DNP | DNP | DNP |
| Players' | DNP | DNP | DNP | DNP |
| Champions Cup | Q | DNP | DNP | DNP |

== Teams ==
| Season | Skip | Third | Second | Lead | Alternate | Events |
|---|---|---|---|---|---|---|
| 2010–11 | Anna Sidorova | Olga Zyablikova | Ekaterina Antonova | Galina Arsenkina | Victoria Moiseeva | (bronze) 2011 WJCC |
| 2011–12 | Olga Zyablikova | Ekaterina Antonova | Victoria Moiseeva | Galina Arsenkina | | |
| 2011–12 | Anna Sidorova | Olga Zyablikova | Victoria Moiseeva | Galina Arsenkina | Alexandra Saitova | (bronze) 2012 WJCC |
| 2012–13 | Ekaterina Antonova (Fourth) | Victoria Moiseeva | Galina Arsenkina | Alexandra Saitova | Alina Kovaleva | |
| 2012–13 | Anna Sidorova | Margarita Fomina | Alexandra Saitova | Ekaterina Galkina | Victoria Moiseeva | (gold) 2013 WU |
| 2014–15 | Anna Sidorova | Margarita Fomina | Alexandra Saitova | Ekaterina Galkina | Victoria Moiseeva | (gold) 2015 WU |
| 2015–16 | Victoria Moiseeva | Julia Portunova | Alina Kovaleva | Julia Guzieva | Anastasia Bryzgalova | |
| 2016–17 | Victoria Moiseeva | Uliana Vasilyeva | Galina Arsenkina | Julia Guzieva | Julia Portunova | (gold) 2016 ECC |
| 2016–17 | Victoria Moiseeva | Uliana Vasilyeva | Galina Arsenkina | Julia Portunova | Maria Duyunova | (silver) 2017 WU |
| 2017–18 | Victoria Moiseeva | Uliana Vasilyeva | Galina Arsenkina | Julia Guzieva | Julia Portunova | 9th 2018 OG |
| 2017–18 | Victoria Moiseeva | Julia Portunova | Galina Arsenkina | Julia Guzieva | Anna Sidorova | (bronze) 2018 WWCC |
