= 2016 European Curling Championships – Women's tournament =

2016 European Curling Championships Women's tournament
- Host city: Renfrewshire, Scotland
- Arena: Braehead Arena
- Dates: November 18–26
- Winner: Russia
- Curling club: CC Adamant, Moscow
- Skip: Victoria Moiseeva
- Third: Uliana Vasilyeva
- Second: Galina Arsenkina
- Lead: Julia Guzieva
- Alternate: Yulia Portunova
- Finalist: Sweden (Anna Hasselborg)

The women's tournament of the 2016 European Curling Championships was held from November 18 to 26 in Renfrewshire, Scotland. The winners of the Group C tournament in Ljubljana, Slovenia moved on to the Group B tournament. The top eight women's teams at the 2016 European Curling Championships will represent their respective nations at the 2017 World Women's Curling Championship in Beijing.

The tournament saw the debut of the Italian team. The Czech team for the first time got into the semifinals. Furthermore, the Russian team headed by skip Victoria Moiseeva debuted on these championships, following their win over Sidorova's defending champion team in the Russian Supercup. Team Russia won the trophy, defeating Team Sweden in the final.

== Group A ==
=== Teams ===
| Czech Republic | Denmark | Finland | Germany | Italy |
|---|---|---|---|---|
| Skip: Anna Kubešková; Third: Alžběta Baudyšová; Second: Tereza Pliksova; Lead: Klara Svatonova; Alternate: Ezhen Kolchevskaia | Skip: Lene Nielsen; Third: Madeleine Dupont; Second: Stephenie Risdal Nielsen; Lead: Charlotte Clemmensen; Alternate: Denise Dupont | Skip: Anne Malmi; Third: Tiina Suuripaa; Second: Tuire Autio; Lead: Lotta Immonen; Alternate: Eszter Juhasz | Skip: Daniela Jentsch; Third: Analena Jentsch; Second: Josephine Obermann; Lead: Pia-Lisa Schöll; Alternate: Marika Trettin | Skip: Federica Apollonio; Third: Giorgia Apollonio; Second: Stefania Menardi; Lead: Claudia Alvera; Alternate: Chiara Olivieri |
| Norway | Russia | Scotland | Switzerland | Sweden |
| Skip: Kristin Skaslien; Third: Anneline Skårsmoen; Second: Julie Kjær Molnar; Lead: Kristine Davanger | Skip: Victoria Moiseeva; Third: Uliana Vasilyeva; Second: Galina Arsenkina; Lead: Julia Guzieva; Alternate: Yulia Portunova | Skip: Eve Muirhead; Third: Anna Sloan; Second: Vicki Adams; Lead: Lauren Gray; Alternate: Kelly Schafer | Skip: Binia Feltscher; Third: Irene Schori; Second: Franziska Kaufmann; Lead: Christine Urech; Alternate: Carole Howald | Skip: Anna Hasselborg; Third: Sara McManus; Second: Agnes Knochenhauer; Lead: Sofia Mabergs; Alternate: Maria Prytz |

=== Round-robin standings ===
Final round-robin standings

Key
| Teams to Playoffs |
| Teams to Tiebreaker |
| Teams relegated to 2017 Group B |

| Country | Skip | W | L | PF | PA | Ends Won | Ends Lost | Blank Ends | Stolen Ends | Shot Pct. |
|---|---|---|---|---|---|---|---|---|---|---|
| Scotland | Eve Muirhead | 9 | 0 | 69 | 40 | 38 | 29 | 15 | 10 | 80% |
| Sweden | Anna Hasselborg | 8 | 1 | 69 | 37 | 39 | 31 | 9 | 12 | 80% |
| Czech Republic | Anna Kubešková | 6 | 3 | 61 | 52 | 38 | 37 | 7 | 9 | 77% |
| Russia | Victoria Moiseeva | 6 | 3 | 50 | 49 | 34 | 30 | 21 | 10 | 78% |
| Denmark | Lene Nielsen | 4 | 5 | 48 | 54 | 31 | 35 | 18 | 7 | 74% |
| Switzerland | Binia Feltscher | 4 | 5 | 60 | 55 | 36 | 36 | 12 | 7 | 77% |
| Germany | Daniela Jentsch | 4 | 5 | 52 | 55 | 34 | 37 | 13 | 5 | 76% |
| Italy | Federica Apollonio | 2 | 7 | 52 | 60 | 38 | 34 | 13 | 10 | 73% |
| Norway | Kristin Skaslien | 1 | 8 | 46 | 69 | 33 | 35 | 12 | 8 | 74% |
| Finland | Anne Malmi | 1 | 8 | 38 | 74 | 25 | 42 | 11 | 4 | 68% |

==== Draw 1 ====
Saturday, November 19, 14:00

| Sheet A | 1 | 2 | 3 | 4 | 5 | 6 | 7 | 8 | 9 | 10 | Final |
|---|---|---|---|---|---|---|---|---|---|---|---|
| Denmark (Nielsen) | 0 | 1 | 2 | 1 | 0 | 2 | 0 | 2 | X | X | 8 |
| Finland (Malmi) | 0 | 0 | 0 | 0 | 1 | 0 | 1 | 0 | X | X | 2 |

| Sheet B | 1 | 2 | 3 | 4 | 5 | 6 | 7 | 8 | 9 | 10 | Final |
|---|---|---|---|---|---|---|---|---|---|---|---|
| Scotland (Muirhead) | 0 | 0 | 0 | 3 | 0 | 1 | 1 | 0 | 1 | 0 | 6 |
| Italy (Apollonio) | 0 | 1 | 1 | 0 | 1 | 0 | 0 | 1 | 0 | 1 | 5 |

| Sheet C | 1 | 2 | 3 | 4 | 5 | 6 | 7 | 8 | 9 | 10 | Final |
|---|---|---|---|---|---|---|---|---|---|---|---|
| Sweden (Hasselborg) | 4 | 0 | 1 | 0 | 3 | 0 | 0 | 1 | X | X | 9 |
| Norway (Skaslien) | 0 | 2 | 0 | 1 | 0 | 1 | 1 | 0 | X | X | 5 |

| Sheet D | 1 | 2 | 3 | 4 | 5 | 6 | 7 | 8 | 9 | 10 | Final |
|---|---|---|---|---|---|---|---|---|---|---|---|
| Germany (Jentsch) | 0 | 1 | 0 | 1 | 0 | 0 | 0 | X | X | X | 2 |
| Czech Republic (Kubešková) | 2 | 0 | 1 | 0 | 1 | 2 | 2 | X | X | X | 8 |

| Sheet E | 1 | 2 | 3 | 4 | 5 | 6 | 7 | 8 | 9 | 10 | Final |
|---|---|---|---|---|---|---|---|---|---|---|---|
| Russia (Moiseeva) | 0 | 2 | 0 | 2 | 0 | 2 | 0 | 2 | 0 | 1 | 9 |
| Switzerland (Feltscher) | 0 | 0 | 2 | 0 | 1 | 0 | 3 | 0 | 2 | 0 | 8 |

==== Draw 2 ====
Sunday, November 20, 08:00

| Sheet A | 1 | 2 | 3 | 4 | 5 | 6 | 7 | 8 | 9 | 10 | Final |
|---|---|---|---|---|---|---|---|---|---|---|---|
| Italy (Apollonio) | 1 | 0 | 1 | 0 | 2 | 0 | 2 | 0 | 1 | 0 | 7 |
| Germany (Jentsch) | 0 | 1 | 0 | 1 | 0 | 2 | 0 | 2 | 0 | 2 | 8 |

| Sheet B | 1 | 2 | 3 | 4 | 5 | 6 | 7 | 8 | 9 | 10 | Final |
|---|---|---|---|---|---|---|---|---|---|---|---|
| Finland (Malmi) | 1 | 1 | 0 | 1 | 0 | 0 | 0 | 1 | 0 | 4 | 8 |
| Czech Republic (Kubešková) | 0 | 0 | 1 | 0 | 1 | 0 | 1 | 0 | 1 | 0 | 4 |

| Sheet C | 1 | 2 | 3 | 4 | 5 | 6 | 7 | 8 | 9 | 10 | Final |
|---|---|---|---|---|---|---|---|---|---|---|---|
| Russia (Moiseeva) | 0 | 0 | 0 | 1 | 0 | 0 | 0 | 0 | 1 | 1 | 3 |
| Denmark (Nielsen) | 0 | 0 | 0 | 0 | 0 | 1 | 0 | 0 | 0 | 0 | 1 |

| Sheet D | 1 | 2 | 3 | 4 | 5 | 6 | 7 | 8 | 9 | 10 | Final |
|---|---|---|---|---|---|---|---|---|---|---|---|
| Switzerland (Feltscher) | 2 | 5 | 0 | 1 | 2 | 0 | X | X | X | X | 10 |
| Norway (Skaslien) | 0 | 0 | 3 | 0 | 0 | 1 | X | X | X | X | 4 |

| Sheet E | 1 | 2 | 3 | 4 | 5 | 6 | 7 | 8 | 9 | 10 | Final |
|---|---|---|---|---|---|---|---|---|---|---|---|
| Scotland (Muirhead) | 0 | 1 | 0 | 0 | 2 | 0 | 2 | 0 | 0 | 1 | 6 |
| Sweden (Hasselborg) | 0 | 0 | 0 | 2 | 0 | 1 | 0 | 1 | 1 | 0 | 5 |

==== Draw 3 ====
Sunday, November 20, 16:00

| Sheet A | 1 | 2 | 3 | 4 | 5 | 6 | 7 | 8 | 9 | 10 | Final |
|---|---|---|---|---|---|---|---|---|---|---|---|
| Norway (Skaslien) | 0 | 0 | 1 | 0 | 1 | 0 | 2 | 1 | 0 | X | 5 |
| Scotland (Muirhead) | 0 | 2 | 0 | 2 | 0 | 2 | 0 | 0 | 4 | X | 10 |

| Sheet B | 1 | 2 | 3 | 4 | 5 | 6 | 7 | 8 | 9 | 10 | Final |
|---|---|---|---|---|---|---|---|---|---|---|---|
| Denmark (Nielsen) | 1 | 2 | 0 | 2 | 0 | 0 | 1 | 0 | 1 | 0 | 7 |
| Switzerland (Feltscher) | 0 | 0 | 1 | 0 | 1 | 1 | 0 | 2 | 0 | 1 | 6 |

| Sheet C | 1 | 2 | 3 | 4 | 5 | 6 | 7 | 8 | 9 | 10 | Final |
|---|---|---|---|---|---|---|---|---|---|---|---|
| Finland (Malmi) | 0 | 3 | 0 | 0 | 0 | 1 | 0 | 0 | 1 | 0 | 5 |
| Germany (Jentsch) | 3 | 0 | 0 | 0 | 0 | 0 | 2 | 1 | 0 | 2 | 8 |

| Sheet D | 1 | 2 | 3 | 4 | 5 | 6 | 7 | 8 | 9 | 10 | Final |
|---|---|---|---|---|---|---|---|---|---|---|---|
| Sweden (Hasselborg) | 0 | 0 | 2 | 1 | 0 | 2 | 0 | 3 | 3 | X | 11 |
| Russia (Moiseeva) | 0 | 1 | 0 | 0 | 2 | 0 | 1 | 0 | 0 | X | 4 |

| Sheet E | 1 | 2 | 3 | 4 | 5 | 6 | 7 | 8 | 9 | 10 | Final |
|---|---|---|---|---|---|---|---|---|---|---|---|
| Italy (Apollonio) | 0 | 1 | 0 | 1 | 0 | 1 | 0 | X | X | X | 3 |
| Czech Republic (Kubešková) | 5 | 0 | 0 | 0 | 3 | 0 | 2 | X | X | X | 10 |

==== Draw 4 ====
Monday, November 21, 12:00

| Sheet A | 1 | 2 | 3 | 4 | 5 | 6 | 7 | 8 | 9 | 10 | Final |
|---|---|---|---|---|---|---|---|---|---|---|---|
| Czech Republic (Kubešková) | 0 | 2 | 0 | 1 | 0 | 1 | 0 | 1 | 0 | 1 | 6 |
| Russia (Moiseeva) | 0 | 0 | 1 | 0 | 1 | 0 | 2 | 0 | 1 | 0 | 5 |

| Sheet B | 1 | 2 | 3 | 4 | 5 | 6 | 7 | 8 | 9 | 10 | Final |
|---|---|---|---|---|---|---|---|---|---|---|---|
| Sweden (Hasselborg) | 0 | 0 | 1 | 1 | 0 | 2 | 0 | 0 | 0 | 1 | 5 |
| Germany (Jentsch) | 1 | 0 | 0 | 0 | 1 | 0 | 0 | 1 | 1 | 0 | 4 |

| Sheet C | 1 | 2 | 3 | 4 | 5 | 6 | 7 | 8 | 9 | 10 | Final |
|---|---|---|---|---|---|---|---|---|---|---|---|
| Switzerland (Feltscher) | 0 | 0 | 1 | 0 | 2 | 0 | 1 | 0 | 4 | X | 8 |
| Italy (Apollonio) | 0 | 0 | 0 | 1 | 0 | 1 | 0 | 2 | 0 | X | 4 |

| Sheet D | 1 | 2 | 3 | 4 | 5 | 6 | 7 | 8 | 9 | 10 | Final |
|---|---|---|---|---|---|---|---|---|---|---|---|
| Norway (Skaslien) | 0 | 0 | 0 | 2 | 2 | 1 | 0 | 0 | 2 | X | 7 |
| Denmark (Nielsen) | 0 | 2 | 4 | 0 | 0 | 0 | 0 | 3 | 0 | X | 9 |

| Sheet E | 1 | 2 | 3 | 4 | 5 | 6 | 7 | 8 | 9 | 10 | Final |
|---|---|---|---|---|---|---|---|---|---|---|---|
| Finland (Malmi) | 0 | 0 | 3 | 0 | 1 | 0 | 0 | X | X | X | 4 |
| Scotland (Muirhead) | 1 | 1 | 0 | 4 | 0 | 3 | 1 | X | X | X | 10 |

==== Draw 5 ====
Monday, November 21, 20:00

| Sheet A | 1 | 2 | 3 | 4 | 5 | 6 | 7 | 8 | 9 | 10 | Final |
|---|---|---|---|---|---|---|---|---|---|---|---|
| Sweden (Hasselborg) | 0 | 1 | 2 | 0 | 0 | 2 | 0 | 2 | 0 | 0 | 7 |
| Italy (Apollonio) | 0 | 0 | 0 | 1 | 1 | 0 | 1 | 0 | 1 | 2 | 6 |

| Sheet B | 1 | 2 | 3 | 4 | 5 | 6 | 7 | 8 | 9 | 10 | Final |
|---|---|---|---|---|---|---|---|---|---|---|---|
| Russia (Moiseeva) | 2 | 0 | 2 | 0 | 0 | 2 | 0 | 2 | X | X | 8 |
| Finland (Malmi) | 0 | 0 | 0 | 2 | 0 | 0 | 1 | 0 | X | X | 3 |

| Sheet C | 1 | 2 | 3 | 4 | 5 | 6 | 7 | 8 | 9 | 10 | Final |
|---|---|---|---|---|---|---|---|---|---|---|---|
| Denmark (Nielsen) | 0 | 2 | 1 | 0 | 1 | 0 | 1 | 0 | 0 | 1 | 6 |
| Czech Republic (Kubešková) | 0 | 0 | 0 | 1 | 0 | 2 | 0 | 2 | 2 | 0 | 7 |

| Sheet D | 1 | 2 | 3 | 4 | 5 | 6 | 7 | 8 | 9 | 10 | Final |
|---|---|---|---|---|---|---|---|---|---|---|---|
| Scotland (Muirhead) | 0 | 0 | 1 | 0 | 0 | 1 | 1 | 0 | 0 | 1 | 4 |
| Switzerland (Feltscher) | 0 | 2 | 0 | 1 | 0 | 0 | 0 | 0 | 0 | 0 | 3 |

| Sheet E | 1 | 2 | 3 | 4 | 5 | 6 | 7 | 8 | 9 | 10 | Final |
|---|---|---|---|---|---|---|---|---|---|---|---|
| Germany (Jentsch) | 2 | 0 | 0 | 0 | 2 | 0 | 0 | 2 | 0 | 1 | 7 |
| Norway (Skaslien) | 0 | 1 | 0 | 1 | 0 | 2 | 0 | 0 | 2 | 0 | 6 |

==== Draw 6 ====
Tuesday, November 22, 14:00

| Sheet A | 1 | 2 | 3 | 4 | 5 | 6 | 7 | 8 | 9 | 10 | Final |
|---|---|---|---|---|---|---|---|---|---|---|---|
| Russia (Moiseeva) | 1 | 0 | 2 | 2 | 0 | 0 | 0 | 1 | 0 | 0 | 6 |
| Norway (Skaslien) | 0 | 2 | 0 | 0 | 1 | 0 | 0 | 0 | 1 | 1 | 5 |

| Sheet B | 1 | 2 | 3 | 4 | 5 | 6 | 7 | 8 | 9 | 10 | 11 | Final |
|---|---|---|---|---|---|---|---|---|---|---|---|---|
| Italy (Apollonio) | 1 | 0 | 1 | 1 | 0 | 2 | 0 | 0 | 0 | 2 | 0 | 7 |
| Denmark (Nielsen) | 0 | 4 | 0 | 0 | 1 | 0 | 1 | 0 | 1 | 0 | 1 | 8 |

| Sheet C | 1 | 2 | 3 | 4 | 5 | 6 | 7 | 8 | 9 | 10 | Final |
|---|---|---|---|---|---|---|---|---|---|---|---|
| Germany (Jentsch) | 0 | 2 | 0 | 1 | 1 | 0 | 0 | 2 | 0 | X | 6 |
| Scotland (Muirhead) | 2 | 0 | 2 | 0 | 0 | 2 | 1 | 0 | 1 | X | 8 |

| Sheet D | 1 | 2 | 3 | 4 | 5 | 6 | 7 | 8 | 9 | 10 | Final |
|---|---|---|---|---|---|---|---|---|---|---|---|
| Czech Republic (Kubešková) | 0 | 1 | 0 | 0 | 2 | 1 | 0 | 1 | 0 | X | 5 |
| Sweden (Hasselborg) | 1 | 0 | 2 | 2 | 0 | 0 | 1 | 0 | 2 | X | 8 |

| Sheet E | 1 | 2 | 3 | 4 | 5 | 6 | 7 | 8 | 9 | 10 | Final |
|---|---|---|---|---|---|---|---|---|---|---|---|
| Switzerland (Feltscher) | 1 | 2 | 0 | 2 | 0 | 0 | 3 | 0 | 0 | 1 | 9 |
| Finland (Malmi) | 0 | 0 | 4 | 0 | 1 | 2 | 0 | 0 | 1 | 0 | 8 |

==== Draw 7 ====
Wednesday, November 23, 8:00

| Sheet A | 1 | 2 | 3 | 4 | 5 | 6 | 7 | 8 | 9 | 10 | Final |
|---|---|---|---|---|---|---|---|---|---|---|---|
| Scotland (Muirhead) | 1 | 2 | 0 | 1 | 0 | 0 | 3 | 0 | 3 | X | 10 |
| Czech Republic (Kubešková) | 0 | 0 | 2 | 0 | 0 | 1 | 0 | 2 | 0 | X | 5 |

| Sheet B | 1 | 2 | 3 | 4 | 5 | 6 | 7 | 8 | 9 | 10 | Final |
|---|---|---|---|---|---|---|---|---|---|---|---|
| Switzerland (Feltscher) | 1 | 0 | 1 | 0 | 0 | 0 | 0 | 0 | X | X | 2 |
| Sweden (Hasselborg) | 0 | 2 | 0 | 2 | 0 | 1 | 1 | 1 | X | X | 7 |

| Sheet C | 1 | 2 | 3 | 4 | 5 | 6 | 7 | 8 | 9 | 10 | Final |
|---|---|---|---|---|---|---|---|---|---|---|---|
| Norway (Skaslien) | 0 | 2 | 0 | 0 | 1 | 0 | 0 | 1 | 1 | 1 | 6 |
| Finland (Malmi) | 1 | 0 | 0 | 1 | 0 | 0 | 1 | 0 | 0 | 0 | 3 |

| Sheet D | 1 | 2 | 3 | 4 | 5 | 6 | 7 | 8 | 9 | 10 | Final |
|---|---|---|---|---|---|---|---|---|---|---|---|
| Russia (Moiseeva) | 1 | 0 | 2 | 0 | 0 | 0 | 1 | 1 | 0 | X | 5 |
| Italy (Apollonio) | 0 | 0 | 0 | 0 | 2 | 0 | 0 | 0 | 1 | X | 3 |

| Sheet E | 1 | 2 | 3 | 4 | 5 | 6 | 7 | 8 | 9 | 10 | Final |
|---|---|---|---|---|---|---|---|---|---|---|---|
| Denmark (Nielsen) | 0 | 0 | 0 | 0 | 1 | 0 | 2 | 0 | X | X | 3 |
| Germany (Jentsch) | 1 | 1 | 0 | 1 | 0 | 4 | 0 | 2 | X | X | 9 |

==== Draw 8 ====
Wednesday, November 23, 16:00

| Sheet A | 1 | 2 | 3 | 4 | 5 | 6 | 7 | 8 | 9 | 10 | Final |
|---|---|---|---|---|---|---|---|---|---|---|---|
| Finland (Malmi) | 0 | 0 | 1 | 0 | 1 | 0 | X | X | X | X | 2 |
| Sweden (Hasselborg) | 2 | 2 | 0 | 2 | 0 | 5 | X | X | X | X | 11 |

| Sheet B | 1 | 2 | 3 | 4 | 5 | 6 | 7 | 8 | 9 | 10 | Final |
|---|---|---|---|---|---|---|---|---|---|---|---|
| Germany (Jentsch) | 0 | 1 | 0 | 1 | 0 | 0 | 0 | 0 | 2 | 0 | 4 |
| Russia (Moiseeva) | 0 | 0 | 2 | 0 | 0 | 2 | 0 | 1 | 0 | 1 | 6 |

| Sheet C | 1 | 2 | 3 | 4 | 5 | 6 | 7 | 8 | 9 | 10 | 11 | Final |
|---|---|---|---|---|---|---|---|---|---|---|---|---|
| Czech Republic (Kubešková) | 0 | 0 | 0 | 1 | 0 | 2 | 2 | 2 | 0 | 0 | 1 | 8 |
| Switzerland (Feltscher) | 1 | 0 | 1 | 0 | 2 | 0 | 0 | 0 | 2 | 1 | 0 | 7 |

| Sheet D | 1 | 2 | 3 | 4 | 5 | 6 | 7 | 8 | 9 | 10 | Final |
|---|---|---|---|---|---|---|---|---|---|---|---|
| Denmark (Nielsen) | 0 | 0 | 2 | 0 | 0 | 0 | 0 | 1 | 0 | X | 3 |
| Scotland (Muirhead) | 2 | 0 | 0 | 0 | 2 | 0 | 0 | 0 | 3 | X | 7 |

| Sheet E | 1 | 2 | 3 | 4 | 5 | 6 | 7 | 8 | 9 | 10 | Final |
|---|---|---|---|---|---|---|---|---|---|---|---|
| Norway (Skaslien) | 0 | 3 | 0 | 0 | 0 | 1 | 0 | 0 | 1 | 0 | 5 |
| Italy (Apollonio) | 1 | 0 | 4 | 0 | 0 | 0 | 0 | 1 | 0 | 1 | 7 |

==== Draw 9 ====
Thursday, November 24, 09:00

| Sheet A | 1 | 2 | 3 | 4 | 5 | 6 | 7 | 8 | 9 | 10 | Final |
|---|---|---|---|---|---|---|---|---|---|---|---|
| Germany (Jentsch) | 0 | 2 | 0 | 1 | 0 | 0 | 0 | 1 | 0 | 0 | 4 |
| Switzerland (Feltscher) | 2 | 0 | 1 | 0 | 0 | 2 | 0 | 0 | 1 | 1 | 7 |

| Sheet B | 1 | 2 | 3 | 4 | 5 | 6 | 7 | 8 | 9 | 10 | Final |
|---|---|---|---|---|---|---|---|---|---|---|---|
| Czech Republic (Kubešková) | 0 | 1 | 0 | 1 | 0 | 1 | 4 | 1 | X | X | 8 |
| Norway (Skaslien) | 1 | 0 | 1 | 0 | 1 | 0 | 0 | 0 | X | X | 3 |

| Sheet C | 1 | 2 | 3 | 4 | 5 | 6 | 7 | 8 | 9 | 10 | Final |
|---|---|---|---|---|---|---|---|---|---|---|---|
| Scotland (Muirhead) | 0 | 0 | 2 | 1 | 0 | 3 | 0 | 0 | 2 | X | 8 |
| Russia (Moiseeva) | 0 | 1 | 0 | 0 | 2 | 0 | 1 | 0 | 0 | X | 4 |

| Sheet D | 1 | 2 | 3 | 4 | 5 | 6 | 7 | 8 | 9 | 10 | Final |
|---|---|---|---|---|---|---|---|---|---|---|---|
| Italy (Apollonio) | 0 | 0 | 1 | 1 | 0 | 2 | 2 | 1 | 3 | X | 10 |
| Finland (Malmi) | 0 | 1 | 0 | 0 | 2 | 0 | 0 | 0 | 0 | X | 3 |

| Sheet E | 1 | 2 | 3 | 4 | 5 | 6 | 7 | 8 | 9 | 10 | Final |
|---|---|---|---|---|---|---|---|---|---|---|---|
| Sweden (Hasselborg) | 0 | 0 | 2 | 0 | 1 | 2 | 0 | 1 | 0 | X | 6 |
| Denmark (Nielsen) | 0 | 1 | 0 | 1 | 0 | 0 | 1 | 0 | 0 | X | 3 |

=== World Challenge Games ===
The World Challenge Games are held between the eighth-ranked team in the Group A round robin and the winner of the Group B tournament to determine which of these two teams will play at the World Championships.

==== Challenge 1 ====
Friday, November 25, 19:00

| Team | 1 | 2 | 3 | 4 | 5 | 6 | 7 | 8 | 9 | 10 | Final |
|---|---|---|---|---|---|---|---|---|---|---|---|
| Hungary (Palancsa) | 1 | 0 | 4 | 0 | 2 | 0 | 0 | 0 | 3 | 0 | 10 |
| Italy (Apollonio) | 0 | 1 | 0 | 1 | 0 | 0 | 4 | 4 | 0 | 3 | 13 |

==== Challenge 2 ====
Saturday, November 26, 9:00

| Team | 1 | 2 | 3 | 4 | 5 | 6 | 7 | 8 | 9 | 10 | Final |
|---|---|---|---|---|---|---|---|---|---|---|---|
| Hungary (Palancsa) | 0 | 0 | 2 | 0 | 0 | 2 | 1 | 0 | 1 | 0 | 6 |
| Italy (Apollonio) | 0 | 2 | 0 | 1 | 2 | 0 | 0 | 1 | 0 | 2 | 8 |

=== Playoffs ===
Semifinals
1 | Scotland | 6
4 | Russia | 11
2 | Sweden | 9
3 | Czech Republic | 2

Final
4 | Russia | 6
2 | Sweden | 4

| Bronze-medal game |
| 1 | Scotland | 6 |
| 3 | Czech Republic | 2 |

==== Semifinals ====
Friday, November 25, 14:00

| Team | 1 | 2 | 3 | 4 | 5 | 6 | 7 | 8 | 9 | 10 | Final |
|---|---|---|---|---|---|---|---|---|---|---|---|
| Scotland (Muirhead) | 0 | 2 | 0 | 2 | 0 | 0 | 2 | 0 | X | X | 6 |
| Russia (Moiseeva) | 2 | 0 | 3 | 0 | 0 | 3 | 0 | 3 | X | X | 11 |

Player percentages
| Scotland | | Russia | |
|---|---|---|---|
| Lauren Gray | 97% | Julia Guzieva | 86% |
| Vicki Adams | 84% | Galina Arsenkina | 77% |
| Anna Sloan | 84% | Uliana Vasileva | 86% |
| Eve Muirhead | 80% | Victoria Moiseeva | 84% |
| Total | 86% | Total | 83% |

| Team | 1 | 2 | 3 | 4 | 5 | 6 | 7 | 8 | 9 | 10 | Final |
|---|---|---|---|---|---|---|---|---|---|---|---|
| Sweden (Hasselborg) | 0 | 0 | 4 | 0 | 0 | 3 | 0 | 2 | X | X | 9 |
| Czech Republic (Kubešková) | 0 | 0 | 0 | 0 | 1 | 0 | 1 | 0 | X | X | 2 |

Player percentages
| Sweden | | Czech Republic | |
|---|---|---|---|
| Sofia Mabergs | 91% | Klara Svatonova | 78% |
| Agnes Knochenhauer | 78% | Tereza Pliskova | 61% |
| Sara McManus | 91% | Alžběta Baudyšová | 80% |
| Anna Hasselborg | 98% | Anna Kubešková | 64% |
| Total | 89% | Total | 73% |

==== Bronze-medal game ====
Friday, November 28, 19:00

| Team | 1 | 2 | 3 | 4 | 5 | 6 | 7 | 8 | 9 | 10 | Final |
|---|---|---|---|---|---|---|---|---|---|---|---|
| Scotland (Muirhead) | 1 | 1 | 0 | 2 | 0 | 0 | 0 | 1 | 1 | X | 6 |
| Czech Republic (Kubešková) | 0 | 0 | 1 | 0 | 1 | 0 | 0 | 0 | 0 | X | 2 |

Player percentages
| Scotland | | Czech Republic | |
|---|---|---|---|
| Lauren Gray | 72% | Klara Svatonova | 88% |
| Vicki Adams | 93% | Tereza Pliskova | 79% |
| Anna Sloan | 86% | Alžběta Baudyšová | 76% |
| Eve Muirhead | 86% | Anna Kubešková | 72% |
| Total | 84% | Total | 79% |

==== Gold-medal game ====
Saturday, November 26, 11:00

| Team | 1 | 2 | 3 | 4 | 5 | 6 | 7 | 8 | 9 | 10 | Final |
|---|---|---|---|---|---|---|---|---|---|---|---|
| Russia (Moiseeva) | 0 | 1 | 0 | 0 | 1 | 1 | 0 | 0 | 1 | 2 | 6 |
| Sweden (Hasselborg) | 2 | 0 | 0 | 1 | 0 | 0 | 0 | 1 | 0 | 0 | 4 |

Player percentages
| Russia | | Sweden | |
|---|---|---|---|
| Julia Guzieva | 85% | Sofia Mabergs | 88% |
| Galina Arsenkina | 75% | Agnes Knochenhauer | 84% |
| Uliana Vasileva | 84% | Sara McManus | 71% |
| Victoria Moiseeva | 79% | Anna Hasselborg | 75% |
| Total | 81% | Total | 80% |

=== Player percentages ===
Round Robin only

| Leads | % |
|---|---|
| (Czech Republic) Klara Svatonova | 83 |
| (Norway) Kristine Davanger | 82 |
| (Scotland) Lauren Gray | 81 |
| (Sweden) Sofia Mabergs | 80 |
| (Switzerland) Christine Urech | 80 |

| Seconds | % |
|---|---|
| (Scotland) Vicki Adams | 83 |
| (Sweden) Agnes Knochenhauer | 81 |
| (Denmark) Stephanie Risdal | 79 |
| (Russia) Galina Arsenkina | 79 |
| (Switzerland) Franziska Kaufmann | 78 |

| Thirds | % |
|---|---|
| (Scotland) Anna Sloan | 78 |
| (Russia) Uliana Vasileva | 78 |
| (Czech Republic) Alžběta Baudyšová | 77 |
| (Sweden) Sara McManus | 77 |
| (Germany) Analena Jentsch | 75 |

| Skips/Fourths | % |
|---|---|
| (Sweden) Anna Hasselborg | 82 |
| (Scotland) Eve Muirhead | 79 |
| (Russia) Victoria Moiseeva | 77 |
| (Germany) Daniela Jentsch | 77 |
| (Denmark) Lene Nielsen | 75 |

== Group B ==
=== Teams ===
| Belarus | England | Estonia | Hungary | Latvia |
|---|---|---|---|---|
| Skip: Alina Pauliuchyk; Third: Daria Bogatova; Second: Aryna Sviarzhynskaya; Lead: Marharyta Dziashuk; Alternate: Natallia Sviarzhynskaya | Skip: Hetty Garnier; Third: Anna Fowler; Second: Angharad Ward; Lead: Naomi Robinson; Alternate: Lauren Pearce | Skip: Maile Mölder; Third: Kristiine Lill; Second: Triin Madisson; Lead: Lembe Marley | Skip: Dorottya Palancsa; Third: Henrietta Miklai; Second: Vera Kalocsai; Lead: Nikolett Sandor; Alternate: Bernadett Biro | Skip: Ieva Krusta; Third: Santa Blumberga; Second: Zanda Bikše; Lead: Evelina Barone; Alternate: Iveta Staša-Šaršūne |
| Lithuania | Netherlands | Poland | Slovakia | Turkey |
| Skip: Virginija Paulauskaitė; Third: Lina Januleviciute; Second: Asta Vaicekonyte; Lead: Olga Dvojeglazova; Alternate: Grazina Eututiene | Skip: Marianne Neeleman; Third: Kimberly Honders; Second: Linda Kreijns; Lead: Bonnie Nilhamn; Alternate: Els Neeleman | Skip: Marta Pluta; Third: Joanna Waryszak; Second: Magdalena Dumanowska; Lead: Joanna Benet; Alternate: Aneta Lipinska | Skip: Elena Axamitova; Third: Jana Vallusova; Second: Jana Matulova; Lead: Martina Madova; Alternate: Slavomira Kristofcakova | Skip: Dilşat Yıldız; Third: Öznur Polat; Second: Semiha Konuksever; Lead: Ayşe Gözutok |

=== Round-robin standings ===
Final round-robin standings

Key
| Teams to Playoffs |
| Teams to Tiebreaker |
| Teams relegated to 2017 Group C |

| Country | Skip | W | L |
|---|---|---|---|
| Hungary | Dorottya Palancsa | 8 | 1 |
| Turkey | Dilsat Yildiz | 7 | 2 |
| Estonia | Maile Mölder | 7 | 2 |
| Netherlands | Marianne Neeleman | 5 | 4 |
| England | Hetty Garnier | 5 | 4 |
| Latvia | Ieva Krusta | 5 | 4 |
| Belarus | Alina Pauliuchyk | 4 | 5 |
| Lithuania | Virginija Paulauskaitė | 2 | 7 |
| Slovakia | Elena Axamitova | 2 | 7 |
| Poland | Marta Pluta | 0 | 9 |

=== Round-robin results ===
==== Draw 1 ====
Saturday, November 19, 09:00

| Sheet G | 1 | 2 | 3 | 4 | 5 | 6 | 7 | 8 | 9 | 10 | Final |
|---|---|---|---|---|---|---|---|---|---|---|---|
| England (Garnier) | 2 | 3 | 1 | 0 | 1 | 2 | 0 | 3 | X | X | 12 |
| Slovakia (Axamitova) | 0 | 0 | 0 | 1 | 0 | 0 | 3 | 0 | X | X | 4 |

| Sheet H | 1 | 2 | 3 | 4 | 5 | 6 | 7 | 8 | 9 | 10 | Final |
|---|---|---|---|---|---|---|---|---|---|---|---|
| Estonia (Mölder) | 1 | 0 | 2 | 1 | 0 | 0 | 1 | 0 | 1 | 0 | 6 |
| Turkey (Yıldız) | 0 | 3 | 0 | 0 | 0 | 2 | 0 | 2 | 0 | 2 | 9 |

| Sheet J | 1 | 2 | 3 | 4 | 5 | 6 | 7 | 8 | 9 | 10 | Final |
|---|---|---|---|---|---|---|---|---|---|---|---|
| Hungary (Palancsa) | 1 | 0 | 3 | 1 | 0 | 0 | 3 | 1 | X | X | 9 |
| Poland (Pluta) | 0 | 2 | 0 | 0 | 0 | 1 | 0 | 0 | X | X | 3 |

| Sheet K | 1 | 2 | 3 | 4 | 5 | 6 | 7 | 8 | 9 | 10 | Final |
|---|---|---|---|---|---|---|---|---|---|---|---|
| Belarus (Pauliuchyk) | 1 | 0 | 0 | 0 | 0 | 0 | 0 | 1 | 1 | X | 3 |
| Netherlands (Neeleman) | 0 | 0 | 2 | 3 | 1 | 2 | 1 | 0 | X | X | 9 |

| Sheet L | 1 | 2 | 3 | 4 | 5 | 6 | 7 | 8 | 9 | 10 | Final |
|---|---|---|---|---|---|---|---|---|---|---|---|
| Lithuania (Paulauskaitė) | 0 | 0 | 0 | 0 | 0 | 0 | 0 | 1 | 0 | X | 1 |
| Latvia (Krusta) | 1 | 0 | 1 | 0 | 1 | 0 | 2 | 0 | 1 | X | 6 |

==== Draw 2 ====
Saturday, November 19, 20:00

| Sheet F | 1 | 2 | 3 | 4 | 5 | 6 | 7 | 8 | 9 | 10 | Final |
|---|---|---|---|---|---|---|---|---|---|---|---|
| Lithuania (Paulauskaitė) | 0 | 0 | 1 | 0 | 1 | 0 | 1 | 0 | 0 | X | 3 |
| Belarus (Pauliuchyk) | 2 | 3 | 0 | 2 | 0 | 0 | 0 | 1 | 3 | X | 11 |

| Sheet G | 1 | 2 | 3 | 4 | 5 | 6 | 7 | 8 | 9 | 10 | Final |
|---|---|---|---|---|---|---|---|---|---|---|---|
| Hungary (Palancsa) | 5 | 0 | 4 | 0 | 1 | 0 | X | X | X | X | 10 |
| Netherlands (Neeleman) | 0 | 0 | 0 | 1 | 0 | 1 | X | X | X | X | 2 |

| Sheet H | 1 | 2 | 3 | 4 | 5 | 6 | 7 | 8 | 9 | 10 | 11 | Final |
|---|---|---|---|---|---|---|---|---|---|---|---|---|
| Slovakia (Axamitova) | 0 | 0 | 2 | 0 | 2 | 0 | 0 | 1 | 1 | 2 | 0 | 8 |
| Estonia (Mölder) | 1 | 3 | 0 | 1 | 0 | 2 | 1 | 0 | 0 | 0 | 2 | 10 |

| Sheet J | 1 | 2 | 3 | 4 | 5 | 6 | 7 | 8 | 9 | 10 | Final |
|---|---|---|---|---|---|---|---|---|---|---|---|
| Latvia (Krusta) | 3 | 0 | 0 | 1 | 0 | 0 | 0 | 1 | 0 | 3 | 8 |
| Turkey (Yıldız) | 0 | 0 | 3 | 0 | 0 | 0 | 1 | 0 | 1 | 0 | 5 |

| Sheet K | 1 | 2 | 3 | 4 | 5 | 6 | 7 | 8 | 9 | 10 | Final |
|---|---|---|---|---|---|---|---|---|---|---|---|
| England (Garnier) | 2 | 0 | 1 | 0 | 0 | 0 | 1 | 1 | 2 | 0 | 7 |
| Poland (Pluta) | 0 | 0 | 0 | 0 | 2 | 3 | 0 | 0 | 0 | 1 | 6 |

==== Draw 3 ====
Sunday, November 20, 12:00

| Sheet F | 1 | 2 | 3 | 4 | 5 | 6 | 7 | 8 | 9 | 10 | 11 | Final |
|---|---|---|---|---|---|---|---|---|---|---|---|---|
| Latvia (Krusta) | 0 | 0 | 0 | 0 | 1 | 2 | 0 | 0 | 3 | 1 | 0 | 7 |
| Netherlands (Neeleman) | 2 | 0 | 1 | 2 | 0 | 0 | 1 | 1 | 0 | 0 | 1 | 8 |

| Sheet G | 1 | 2 | 3 | 4 | 5 | 6 | 7 | 8 | 9 | 10 | Final |
|---|---|---|---|---|---|---|---|---|---|---|---|
| Belarus (Pauliuchyk) | 2 | 1 | 0 | 0 | 0 | 3 | 0 | 0 | 0 | 1 | 7 |
| England (Garnier) | 0 | 0 | 0 | 0 | 1 | 0 | 0 | 3 | 0 | 0 | 4 |

| Sheet H | 1 | 2 | 3 | 4 | 5 | 6 | 7 | 8 | 9 | 10 | Final |
|---|---|---|---|---|---|---|---|---|---|---|---|
| Poland (Pluta) | 0 | 0 | 1 | 0 | 2 | 0 | 0 | 1 | 0 | X | 4 |
| Slovakia (Axamitova) | 2 | 2 | 0 | 1 | 0 | 2 | 2 | 0 | 4 | X | 13 |

| Sheet J | 1 | 2 | 3 | 4 | 5 | 6 | 7 | 8 | 9 | 10 | Final |
|---|---|---|---|---|---|---|---|---|---|---|---|
| Estonia (Mölder) | 0 | 0 | 2 | 0 | 2 | 1 | 0 | 3 | 0 | 0 | 8 |
| Hungary (Palancsa) | 1 | 2 | 0 | 1 | 0 | 0 | 2 | 0 | 2 | 1 | 9 |

| Sheet K | 1 | 2 | 3 | 4 | 5 | 6 | 7 | 8 | 9 | 10 | Final |
|---|---|---|---|---|---|---|---|---|---|---|---|
| Turkey (Yıldız) | 1 | 3 | 0 | 4 | 0 | 2 | 1 | X | X | X | 11 |
| Lithuania (Paulauskaitė) | 0 | 0 | 2 | 0 | 1 | 0 | 0 | X | X | X | 3 |

==== Draw 4 ====
Sunday, November 20, 20:00

| Sheet G | 1 | 2 | 3 | 4 | 5 | 6 | 7 | 8 | 9 | 10 | Final |
|---|---|---|---|---|---|---|---|---|---|---|---|
| Poland (Pluta) | 0 | 0 | 1 | 0 | 2 | 0 | 2 | 0 | 1 | 0 | 6 |
| Estonia (Mölder) | 2 | 0 | 0 | 1 | 0 | 1 | 0 | 2 | 0 | 1 | 7 |

| Sheet H | 1 | 2 | 3 | 4 | 5 | 6 | 7 | 8 | 9 | 10 | Final |
|---|---|---|---|---|---|---|---|---|---|---|---|
| Latvia (Krusta) | 1 | 0 | 0 | 1 | 0 | 2 | 0 | 2 | 0 | X | 6 |
| England (Garnier) | 0 | 1 | 1 | 0 | 3 | 0 | 3 | 0 | 4 | X | 12 |

| Sheet J | 1 | 2 | 3 | 4 | 5 | 6 | 7 | 8 | 9 | 10 | Final |
|---|---|---|---|---|---|---|---|---|---|---|---|
| Turkey (Yıldız) | 0 | 0 | 2 | 0 | 1 | 0 | 3 | 3 | X | X | 9 |
| Belarus (Pauliuchyk) | 1 | 0 | 0 | 1 | 0 | 1 | 0 | 0 | X | X | 3 |

| Sheet K | 1 | 2 | 3 | 4 | 5 | 6 | 7 | 8 | 9 | 10 | Final |
|---|---|---|---|---|---|---|---|---|---|---|---|
| Lithuania (Paulauskaitė) | 0 | 0 | 0 | 1 | 0 | 0 | X | X | X | X | 1 |
| Hungary (Palancsa) | 3 | 1 | 3 | 0 | 3 | 1 | X | X | X | X | 11 |

| Sheet L | 1 | 2 | 3 | 4 | 5 | 6 | 7 | 8 | 9 | 10 | Final |
|---|---|---|---|---|---|---|---|---|---|---|---|
| Netherlands (Neeleman) | 1 | 0 | 0 | 0 | 1 | 0 | 1 | 0 | 3 | 1 | 7 |
| Slovakia (Axamitova) | 0 | 1 | 1 | 0 | 0 | 2 | 0 | 2 | 0 | 0 | 6 |

==== Draw 5 ====
Monday, November 21, 12:00

| Sheet F | 1 | 2 | 3 | 4 | 5 | 6 | 7 | 8 | 9 | 10 | Final |
|---|---|---|---|---|---|---|---|---|---|---|---|
| Slovakia Axamitova) | 0 | 1 | 1 | 0 | 2 | 0 | 2 | 1 | 3 | 0 | 10 |
| Lithuania (Paulauskaitė) | 2 | 0 | 0 | 4 | 0 | 1 | 0 | 0 | 0 | 2 | 9 |

| Sheet G | 1 | 2 | 3 | 4 | 5 | 6 | 7 | 8 | 9 | 10 | Final |
|---|---|---|---|---|---|---|---|---|---|---|---|
| Turkey (Yıldız) | 0 | 0 | 2 | 0 | 1 | 0 | 0 | 2 | 0 | X | 5 |
| Hungary (Palancsa) | 0 | 0 | 0 | 1 | 0 | 1 | 0 | 0 | 1 | X | 3 |

| Sheet J | 1 | 2 | 3 | 4 | 5 | 6 | 7 | 8 | 9 | 10 | 11 | Final |
|---|---|---|---|---|---|---|---|---|---|---|---|---|
| England (Garnier) | 1 | 0 | 1 | 0 | 0 | 1 | 1 | 0 | 0 | 2 | 0 | 6 |
| Netherlands (Neeleman) | 0 | 1 | 0 | 1 | 1 | 0 | 0 | 1 | 2 | 0 | 1 | 7 |

| Sheet K | 1 | 2 | 3 | 4 | 5 | 6 | 7 | 8 | 9 | 10 | Final |
|---|---|---|---|---|---|---|---|---|---|---|---|
| Poland (Pluta) | 2 | 0 | 0 | 1 | 0 | 0 | 3 | 0 | 1 | 0 | 7 |
| Latvia (Krusta) | 0 | 0 | 3 | 0 | 2 | 0 | 2 | 0 | 0 | 1 | 8 |

| Sheet L | 1 | 2 | 3 | 4 | 5 | 6 | 7 | 8 | 9 | 10 | Final |
|---|---|---|---|---|---|---|---|---|---|---|---|
| Estonia (Mölder) | 0 | 1 | 0 | 1 | 0 | 1 | 3 | 0 | 0 | X | 6 |
| Belarus (Pauliuchyk) | 0 | 0 | 1 | 0 | 1 | 0 | 0 | 0 | 2 | X | 4 |

==== Draw 6 ====
Monday, November 21, 20:00

| Sheet F | 1 | 2 | 3 | 4 | 5 | 6 | 7 | 8 | 9 | 10 | Final |
|---|---|---|---|---|---|---|---|---|---|---|---|
| England (Garnier) | 0 | 1 | 1 | 1 | 0 | 0 | 0 | 2 | 0 | X | 5 |
| Turkey (Yıldız) | 1 | 0 | 0 | 0 | 1 | 0 | 0 | 0 | 1 | X | 3 |

| Sheet G | 1 | 2 | 3 | 4 | 5 | 6 | 7 | 8 | 9 | 10 | Final |
|---|---|---|---|---|---|---|---|---|---|---|---|
| Lithuania (Paulauskaitė) | 0 | 0 | 0 | 1 | 0 | 0 | 1 | 1 | 1 | 1 | 5 |
| Poland (Pluta) | 0 | 0 | 1 | 0 | 2 | 1 | 0 | 0 | 0 | 0 | 4 |

| Sheet H | 1 | 2 | 3 | 4 | 5 | 6 | 7 | 8 | 9 | 10 | Final |
|---|---|---|---|---|---|---|---|---|---|---|---|
| Hungary (Palancsa) | 0 | 3 | 0 | 1 | 0 | 3 | 0 | 0 | 3 | X | 10 |
| Latvia (Krusta) | 1 | 0 | 3 | 0 | 2 | 0 | 1 | 1 | 0 | X | 8 |

| Sheet J | 1 | 2 | 3 | 4 | 5 | 6 | 7 | 8 | 9 | 10 | Final |
|---|---|---|---|---|---|---|---|---|---|---|---|
| Belarus (Pauliuchyk) | 1 | 0 | 2 | 0 | 4 | 2 | 0 | 0 | 1 | X | 10 |
| Slovakia (Axamitova) | 0 | 1 | 0 | 1 | 0 | 0 | 1 | 1 | 0 | X | 4 |

| Sheet K | 1 | 2 | 3 | 4 | 5 | 6 | 7 | 8 | 9 | 10 | Final |
|---|---|---|---|---|---|---|---|---|---|---|---|
| Netherlands (Neeleman) | 0 | 1 | 1 | 0 | 2 | 0 | 1 | 0 | 0 | X | 5 |
| Estonia (Mölder) | 0 | 0 | 0 | 1 | 0 | 1 | 0 | 3 | 2 | X | 7 |

==== Draw 7 ====
Tuesday, November 22, 12:00

| Sheet F | 1 | 2 | 3 | 4 | 5 | 6 | 7 | 8 | 9 | 10 | 11 | Final |
|---|---|---|---|---|---|---|---|---|---|---|---|---|
| Estonia (Mölder) | 0 | 0 | 0 | 0 | 2 | 1 | 0 | 0 | 2 | 0 | 1 | 6 |
| England (Garnier) | 0 | 1 | 1 | 2 | 0 | 0 | 0 | 1 | 0 | 0 | 0 | 5 |

| Sheet G | 1 | 2 | 3 | 4 | 5 | 6 | 7 | 8 | 9 | 10 | 11 | Final |
|---|---|---|---|---|---|---|---|---|---|---|---|---|
| Netherlands (Neeleman) | 0 | 0 | 0 | 1 | 1 | 0 | 1 | 2 | 0 | 1 | 0 | 6 |
| Lithuania (Paulauskaitė) | 0 | 1 | 1 | 0 | 0 | 1 | 0 | 0 | 3 | 0 | 1 | 7 |

| Sheet H | 1 | 2 | 3 | 4 | 5 | 6 | 7 | 8 | 9 | 10 | Final |
|---|---|---|---|---|---|---|---|---|---|---|---|
| Belarus (Pauliuchyk) | 0 | 0 | 0 | 2 | 0 | 2 | 0 | 0 | 0 | 0 | 4 |
| Hungary (Palancsa) | 0 | 0 | 1 | 0 | 1 | 0 | 2 | 1 | 0 | 1 | 6 |

| Sheet J | 1 | 2 | 3 | 4 | 5 | 6 | 7 | 8 | 9 | 10 | Final |
|---|---|---|---|---|---|---|---|---|---|---|---|
| Slovakia (Axamitova) | 0 | 0 | 1 | 0 | 0 | 1 | 0 | 1 | 1 | X | 4 |
| Latvia (Krusta) | 2 | 0 | 0 | 1 | 1 | 0 | 2 | 0 | 0 | X | 6 |

| Sheet L | 1 | 2 | 3 | 4 | 5 | 6 | 7 | 8 | 9 | 10 | 11 | Final |
|---|---|---|---|---|---|---|---|---|---|---|---|---|
| Poland (Pluta) | 0 | 0 | 0 | 1 | 1 | 1 | 0 | 1 | 0 | 0 | 0 | 4 |
| Turkey (Yıldız) | 0 | 1 | 0 | 0 | 0 | 0 | 1 | 0 | 1 | 1 | 1 | 5 |

==== Draw 8 ====
Tuesday, November 22, 20:00

| Sheet G | 1 | 2 | 3 | 4 | 5 | 6 | 7 | 8 | 9 | 10 | Final |
|---|---|---|---|---|---|---|---|---|---|---|---|
| Latvia (Krusta) | 1 | 0 | 1 | 0 | 3 | 1 | 1 | 0 | 1 | X | 8 |
| Belarus (Pauliuchyk) | 0 | 1 | 0 | 4 | 0 | 0 | 0 | 1 | 0 | X | 6 |

| Sheet J | 1 | 2 | 3 | 4 | 5 | 6 | 7 | 8 | 9 | 10 | Final |
|---|---|---|---|---|---|---|---|---|---|---|---|
| Lithuania (Paulauskaitė) | 0 | 0 | 1 | 0 | 1 | 0 | 0 | 0 | 1 | X | 3 |
| Estonia (Mölder) | 1 | 1 | 0 | 3 | 0 | 1 | 1 | 0 | 0 | X | 9 |

| Sheet K | 1 | 2 | 3 | 4 | 5 | 6 | 7 | 8 | 9 | 10 | Final |
|---|---|---|---|---|---|---|---|---|---|---|---|
| Slovakia (Axamitova) | 1 | 1 | 0 | 1 | 1 | 0 | 0 | 0 | 1 | 0 | 5 |
| Turkey (Yıldız) | 0 | 0 | 0 | 0 | 0 | 3 | 2 | 1 | 0 | 3 | 9 |

==== Draw 9 ====
Wednesday, November 23, 08:00

| Sheet L | 1 | 2 | 3 | 4 | 5 | 6 | 7 | 8 | 9 | 10 | 11 | Final |
|---|---|---|---|---|---|---|---|---|---|---|---|---|
| Hungary (Palancsa) | 1 | 0 | 2 | 0 | 0 | 2 | 0 | 0 | 2 | 1 | 1 | 9 |
| England (Garnier) | 0 | 0 | 0 | 2 | 1 | 0 | 2 | 3 | 0 | 0 | 0 | 8 |

==== Draw 10 ====
Wednesday, November 23, 12:00

| Sheet F | 1 | 2 | 3 | 4 | 5 | 6 | 7 | 8 | 9 | 10 | Final |
|---|---|---|---|---|---|---|---|---|---|---|---|
| Belarus (Pauliuchyk) | 0 | 2 | 0 | 0 | 0 | 0 | 1 | 2 | 0 | 1 | 6 |
| Poland (Pluta) | 1 | 0 | 0 | 0 | 1 | 2 | 0 | 0 | 1 | 0 | 5 |

| Sheet L | 1 | 2 | 3 | 4 | 5 | 6 | 7 | 8 | 9 | 10 | Final |
|---|---|---|---|---|---|---|---|---|---|---|---|
| Turkey (Yıldız) | 0 | 1 | 2 | 2 | 0 | 3 | 0 | X | X | X | 8 |
| Netherlands (Neeleman) | 0 | 0 | 0 | 0 | 1 | 0 | 1 | X | X | X | 2 |

==== Draw 11 ====
Wednesday, November 23, 16:00

| Sheet F | 1 | 2 | 3 | 4 | 5 | 6 | 7 | 8 | 9 | 10 | Final |
|---|---|---|---|---|---|---|---|---|---|---|---|
| Hungary (Palancsa) | 1 | 3 | 1 | 0 | 0 | 0 | 3 | 0 | 0 | 1 | 9 |
| Slovakia (Axamitova) | 0 | 0 | 0 | 2 | 1 | 0 | 0 | 2 | 1 | 0 | 6 |

| Sheet G | 1 | 2 | 3 | 4 | 5 | 6 | 7 | 8 | 9 | 10 | Final |
|---|---|---|---|---|---|---|---|---|---|---|---|
| Estonia (Mölder) | 2 | 0 | 0 | 3 | 1 | 0 | 0 | 0 | 4 | X | 10 |
| Latvia (Krusta) | 0 | 1 | 3 | 0 | 0 | 1 | 1 | 0 | 0 | X | 6 |

| Sheet H | 1 | 2 | 3 | 4 | 5 | 6 | 7 | 8 | 9 | 10 | 11 | Final |
|---|---|---|---|---|---|---|---|---|---|---|---|---|
| England (Garnier) | 0 | 0 | 4 | 0 | 1 | 0 | 0 | 0 | 0 | 1 | 1 | 7 |
| Lithuania (Paulauskaitė) | 0 | 1 | 0 | 2 | 0 | 1 | 1 | 0 | 1 | 0 | 0 | 6 |

==== Draw 12 ====
Wednesday, November 23, 20:00

| Sheet H | 1 | 2 | 3 | 4 | 5 | 6 | 7 | 8 | 9 | 10 | Final |
|---|---|---|---|---|---|---|---|---|---|---|---|
| Netherlands (Neeleman) | 1 | 2 | 0 | 0 | 3 | 0 | 0 | 0 | 0 | 1 | 7 |
| Poland (Pluta) | 0 | 0 | 2 | 1 | 0 | 1 | 2 | 0 | 0 | 0 | 6 |

=== Placement game ===
Thursday, November 24, 09:00

| Sheet L | 1 | 2 | 3 | 4 | 5 | 6 | 7 | 8 | 9 | 10 | Final |
|---|---|---|---|---|---|---|---|---|---|---|---|
| Slovakia (Axamitova) | 0 | 0 | 0 | 1 | 0 | 1 | 1 | 0 | 2 | X | 5 |
| Lithuania (Paulauskaitė) | 3 | 0 | 1 | 0 | 2 | 0 | 0 | 1 | 0 | X | 7 |

=== Tiebreaker ===
Thursday, November 24, 09:00

| Sheet G | 1 | 2 | 3 | 4 | 5 | 6 | 7 | 8 | 9 | 10 | Final |
|---|---|---|---|---|---|---|---|---|---|---|---|
| Netherlands (Neeleman) | 2 | 0 | 1 | 1 | 0 | 0 | 1 | 0 | 2 | 1 | 8 |
| England (Garnier) | 0 | 2 | 0 | 0 | 3 | 1 | 0 | 1 | 0 | 0 | 7 |

=== Playoffs ===
Semifinals
1 | Hungary | 9
4 | Netherlands | 8
2 | Turkey | 10
3 | Estonia | 2

Final
1 | Hungary | 6
2 | Turkey | 5

| Bronze-medal game |
| 4 | Netherlands | 5 |
| 3 | Estonia | 7 |

==== Semifinals ====
Thursday, November 24, 14:30

| Sheet B | 1 | 2 | 3 | 4 | 5 | 6 | 7 | 8 | 9 | 10 | Final |
|---|---|---|---|---|---|---|---|---|---|---|---|
| Hungary (Palancsa) | 1 | 0 | 2 | 0 | 2 | 0 | 0 | 0 | 3 | 1 | 9 |
| Netherlands (Neeleman) | 0 | 2 | 0 | 1 | 0 | 1 | 2 | 2 | 0 | 0 | 8 |

| Sheet A | 1 | 2 | 3 | 4 | 5 | 6 | 7 | 8 | 9 | 10 | Final |
|---|---|---|---|---|---|---|---|---|---|---|---|
| Turkey (Yıldız) | 0 | 2 | 0 | 3 | 0 | 1 | 2 | 2 | X | X | 10 |
| Estonia (Mölder) | 0 | 0 | 1 | 0 | 1 | 0 | 0 | 0 | X | X | 2 |

==== Bronze-medal game ====
Friday, November 25, 13:00

| Team | 1 | 2 | 3 | 4 | 5 | 6 | 7 | 8 | 9 | 10 | Final |
|---|---|---|---|---|---|---|---|---|---|---|---|
| Netherlands (Neeleman) | 1 | 0 | 1 | 0 | 1 | 0 | 0 | 1 | 1 | 0 | 5 |
| Estonia (Môlder) | 0 | 0 | 0 | 2 | 0 | 0 | 4 | 0 | 0 | 1 | 7 |

==== Gold-medal game ====
Friday, November 25, 13:00

| Team | 1 | 2 | 3 | 4 | 5 | 6 | 7 | 8 | 9 | 10 | Final |
|---|---|---|---|---|---|---|---|---|---|---|---|
| Hungary (Palancsa) | 2 | 0 | 0 | 1 | 0 | 1 | 0 | 0 | 0 | 2 | 6 |
| Turkey (Yıldız) | 0 | 0 | 0 | 0 | 2 | 0 | 1 | 1 | 1 | 0 | 5 |

== Group C ==
=== Teams ===
| Austria | Belarus | Croatia | Ireland |
|---|---|---|---|
| Skip: Constanze Ocker; Third: Hannah Augustin; Second: Marijke Reitsma; Lead: Rebecca Csenar; Alternate: Elisabeth Trauner | Skip: Alina Pauliuchyk; Third: Daria Bogatova; Second: Aryna Sviarzhynskaya; Lead: Marharyta Dziashuk; Alternate: Natallia Sviarzhynskaya | Fourth: Marijana Bozic; Third: Maja Sertic; Skip: Melani Turkovic; Lead: Emina Crnaic; Alternate: Vanja Beganovic | Skip: Ailsa Anderson; Third: Katie Kerr; Second: Hazel Gormley-Leahy; Lead: Clare McCormick |
| Lithuania | Romania | Slovenia | Spain |
| Skip: Virginija Paulauskaitė; Third: Lina Januleviciute; Second: Asta Vaicekonyte; Lead: Olga Dvojeglazova; Alternate: Grazina Eututiene | Skip: Iulia Ioana Traila; Third: Valentina Crina Boboc; Second: Karla Francisca Oprea; Lead: Octavia Maria Traila | Fourth: Patricija Cerne; Skip: Nika Cerne; Second: Ana Smolej; Lead: Nika Svetina; Alternate: Eva Sever | Skip: Oihane Otaegi; Third: Leire Otaegi; Second: Aitana Saenz; Lead: Asuncion Manterola; Alternate: Estrella Labrador |

=== Round-robin standings ===
Final round-robin standings

Key
| Teams to Playoffs |

| Country | Skip | W | L |
|---|---|---|---|
| Belarus | Alina Pauliuchyk | 7 | 0 |
| Austria | Constanze Ocker | 5 | 2 |
| Lithuania | Virginija Paulauskaitė | 5 | 2 |
| Spain | Oihane Otaegi | 5 | 2 |
| Croatia | Melani Turkovic | 3 | 4 |
| Slovenia | Nika Cerne | 2 | 5 |
| Ireland | Ailsa Anderson | 1 | 6 |
| Romania | Iulia Ioana Traila | 0 | 7 |

=== Round-robin results ===
==== Draw 1 ====
| Sheet B | 1 | 2 | 3 | 4 | 5 | 6 | 7 | 8 | 9 | 10 | Final |
|---|---|---|---|---|---|---|---|---|---|---|---|
| Romania (Traila) | 0 | 0 | 2 | 0 | 1 | 0 | 0 | 2 | 1 | 0 | 6 |
| Ireland (Anderson) | 4 | 1 | 0 | 1 | 0 | 1 | 1 | 0 | 0 | 1 | 9 |

| Sheet C | 1 | 2 | 3 | 4 | 5 | 6 | 7 | 8 | 9 | 10 | Final |
|---|---|---|---|---|---|---|---|---|---|---|---|
| Belarus (Pavlyuchik) | 0 | 3 | 0 | 1 | 0 | 1 | 0 | 1 | 1 | X | 7 |
| Austria (Ocker) | 2 | 0 | 1 | 0 | 1 | 0 | 1 | 0 | 0 | X | 5 |

| Sheet D | 1 | 2 | 3 | 4 | 5 | 6 | 7 | 8 | 9 | 10 | Final |
|---|---|---|---|---|---|---|---|---|---|---|---|
| Croatia (Turkovic) | 0 | 1 | 0 | 1 | 1 | 0 | 0 | 2 | 0 | X | 5 |
| Lithuania (Paulauskaitė) | 1 | 0 | 1 | 0 | 0 | 4 | 2 | 0 | 4 | X | 12 |

| Sheet E | 1 | 2 | 3 | 4 | 5 | 6 | 7 | 8 | 9 | 10 | Final |
|---|---|---|---|---|---|---|---|---|---|---|---|
| Spain (Otaegi) | 1 | 0 | 0 | 0 | 0 | 2 | 1 | 0 | 2 | 1 | 7 |
| Slovenia (Cerne) | 0 | 1 | 1 | 0 | 1 | 0 | 0 | 2 | 0 | 0 | 5 |

==== Draw 2 ====
| Sheet A | 1 | 2 | 3 | 4 | 5 | 6 | 7 | 8 | 9 | 10 | Final |
|---|---|---|---|---|---|---|---|---|---|---|---|
| Spain (Otaegi) | 0 | 1 | 0 | 0 | 1 | 0 | 2 | 0 | 0 | X | 4 |
| Lithuania (Paulauskaitė) | 1 | 0 | 3 | 3 | 0 | 1 | 0 | 2 | 3 | X | 13 |

| Sheet B | 1 | 2 | 3 | 4 | 5 | 6 | 7 | 8 | 9 | 10 | Final |
|---|---|---|---|---|---|---|---|---|---|---|---|
| Slovenia (Cerne) | 0 | 0 | 0 | 1 | 0 | 2 | 0 | 0 | 1 | X | 4 |
| Belarus (Pavlyuchik) | 1 | 2 | 1 | 0 | 1 | 0 | 1 | 2 | 0 | X | 8 |

| Sheet C | 1 | 2 | 3 | 4 | 5 | 6 | 7 | 8 | 9 | 10 | Final |
|---|---|---|---|---|---|---|---|---|---|---|---|
| Croatia (Turkovic) | 1 | 0 | 1 | 0 | 4 | 0 | 2 | 0 | 1 | 1 | 10 |
| Ireland (Anderson) | 0 | 4 | 0 | 1 | 0 | 3 | 0 | 1 | 0 | 0 | 9 |

| Sheet D | 1 | 2 | 3 | 4 | 5 | 6 | 7 | 8 | 9 | 10 | Final |
|---|---|---|---|---|---|---|---|---|---|---|---|
| Austria (Ocker) | 3 | 0 | 4 | 0 | 1 | 0 | 0 | 1 | 0 | X | 9 |
| Romania (Traila) | 0 | 1 | 0 | 1 | 0 | 1 | 1 | 0 | 0 | X | 4 |

==== Draw 3 ====
| Sheet A | 1 | 2 | 3 | 4 | 5 | 6 | 7 | 8 | 9 | 10 | Final |
|---|---|---|---|---|---|---|---|---|---|---|---|
| Lithuania (Paulauskaitė) | 0 | 0 | 1 | 0 | 0 | 2 | 1 | 1 | 0 | 1 | 6 |
| Ireland (Anderson) | 1 | 1 | 0 | 1 | 1 | 0 | 0 | 0 | 1 | 0 | 5 |

| Sheet B | 1 | 2 | 3 | 4 | 5 | 6 | 7 | 8 | 9 | 10 | Final |
|---|---|---|---|---|---|---|---|---|---|---|---|
| Croatia (Turkovic) | 0 | 2 | 0 | 1 | 0 | 0 | 1 | 0 | 0 | 1 | 5 |
| Austria (Ocker) | 1 | 0 | 1 | 0 | 1 | 1 | 0 | 1 | 1 | 0 | 6 |

| Sheet C | 1 | 2 | 3 | 4 | 5 | 6 | 7 | 8 | 9 | 10 | Final |
|---|---|---|---|---|---|---|---|---|---|---|---|
| Romania (Traila) | 0 | 3 | 0 | 1 | 1 | 0 | 0 | 1 | 0 | X | 6 |
| Slovenia (Cerne) | 1 | 0 | 1 | 0 | 0 | 2 | 2 | 0 | 2 | X | 8 |

| Sheet E | 1 | 2 | 3 | 4 | 5 | 6 | 7 | 8 | 9 | 10 | 11 | Final |
|---|---|---|---|---|---|---|---|---|---|---|---|---|
| Belarus (Pavlyuchik) | 0 | 4 | 0 | 0 | 1 | 0 | 0 | 1 | 0 | 1 | 1 | 8 |
| Spain (Otaegi) | 2 | 0 | 0 | 1 | 0 | 1 | 2 | 0 | 1 | 0 | 0 | 7 |

==== Draw 4 ====
| Sheet A | 1 | 2 | 3 | 4 | 5 | 6 | 7 | 8 | 9 | 10 | Final |
|---|---|---|---|---|---|---|---|---|---|---|---|
| Ireland (Anderson) | 0 | 1 | 2 | 1 | 0 | 0 | 0 | 1 | 0 | 0 | 5 |
| Slovenia (Cerne) | 0 | 0 | 0 | 0 | 2 | 1 | 5 | 0 | 0 | 2 | 10 |

| Sheet B | 1 | 2 | 3 | 4 | 5 | 6 | 7 | 8 | 9 | 10 | Final |
|---|---|---|---|---|---|---|---|---|---|---|---|
| Austria (Ocker) | 4 | 0 | 0 | 1 | 1 | 0 | 2 | 0 | 2 | 1 | 11 |
| Lithuania (Paulauskaitė) | 0 | 2 | 1 | 0 | 0 | 3 | 0 | 2 | 0 | 0 | 8 |

| Sheet C | 1 | 2 | 3 | 4 | 5 | 6 | 7 | 8 | 9 | 10 | Final |
|---|---|---|---|---|---|---|---|---|---|---|---|
| Spain (Otaegi) | 1 | 2 | 0 | 2 | 1 | 0 | 3 | 0 | X | X | 9 |
| Croatia (Turkovic) | 0 | 0 | 3 | 0 | 0 | 1 | 0 | 1 | X | X | 5 |

| Sheet D | 1 | 2 | 3 | 4 | 5 | 6 | 7 | 8 | 9 | 10 | Final |
|---|---|---|---|---|---|---|---|---|---|---|---|
| Romania (Traila) | 0 | 0 | 0 | 1 | 0 | 2 | 0 | 0 | X | X | 3 |
| Belarus (Pavlyuchik) | 0 | 1 | 1 | 0 | 2 | 0 | 3 | 2 | X | X | 9 |

==== Draw 5 ====
| Sheet A | 1 | 2 | 3 | 4 | 5 | 6 | 7 | 8 | 9 | 10 | 11 | Final |
|---|---|---|---|---|---|---|---|---|---|---|---|---|
| Belarus (Pavlyuchik) | 1 | 0 | 1 | 1 | 2 | 0 | 1 | 0 | 0 | 0 | 1 | 7 |
| Croatia (Turkovic) | 0 | 1 | 0 | 0 | 0 | 1 | 0 | 2 | 1 | 1 | 0 | 6 |

| Sheet C | 1 | 2 | 3 | 4 | 5 | 6 | 7 | 8 | 9 | 10 | Final |
|---|---|---|---|---|---|---|---|---|---|---|---|
| Lithuania (Paulauskaitė) | 1 | 1 | 3 | 0 | 3 | 1 | 2 | X | X | X | 11 |
| Romania (Traila) | 0 | 0 | 0 | 3 | 0 | 0 | 0 | X | X | X | 3 |

| Sheet D | 1 | 2 | 3 | 4 | 5 | 6 | 7 | 8 | 9 | 10 | Final |
|---|---|---|---|---|---|---|---|---|---|---|---|
| Ireland (Anderson) | 0 | 1 | 0 | 0 | 0 | 0 | X | X | X | X | 1 |
| Spain (Otaegi) | 3 | 0 | 4 | 0 | 1 | 2 | X | X | X | X | 10 |

| Sheet E | 1 | 2 | 3 | 4 | 5 | 6 | 7 | 8 | 9 | 10 | Final |
|---|---|---|---|---|---|---|---|---|---|---|---|
| Slovenia (Cerne) | 0 | 2 | 1 | 0 | 1 | 0 | 0 | 2 | 0 | X | 6 |
| Austria (Ocker) | 2 | 0 | 0 | 2 | 0 | 1 | 3 | 0 | 3 | X | 11 |

==== Draw 6 ====
| Sheet A | 1 | 2 | 3 | 4 | 5 | 6 | 7 | 8 | 9 | 10 | Final |
|---|---|---|---|---|---|---|---|---|---|---|---|
| Austria (Ocker) | 0 | 0 | 3 | 0 | 0 | 0 | X | X | X | X | 3 |
| Spain (Otaegi) | 3 | 2 | 0 | 3 | 1 | 2 | X | X | X | X | 11 |

| Sheet B | 1 | 2 | 3 | 4 | 5 | 6 | 7 | 8 | 9 | 10 | Final |
|---|---|---|---|---|---|---|---|---|---|---|---|
| Lithuania (Paulauskaitė) | 3 | 1 | 0 | 1 | 0 | 1 | 0 | 2 | 0 | 1 | 9 |
| Slovenia (Cerne) | 0 | 0 | 3 | 0 | 2 | 0 | 1 | 0 | 0 | 0 | 6 |

| Sheet D | 1 | 2 | 3 | 4 | 5 | 6 | 7 | 8 | 9 | 10 | Final |
|---|---|---|---|---|---|---|---|---|---|---|---|
| Ireland (Anderson) | 0 | 0 | 1 | 0 | 0 | 1 | 0 | 1 | X | X | 3 |
| Belarus (Pavlyuchik) | 0 | 2 | 0 | 3 | 1 | 0 | 2 | 0 | X | X | 8 |

| Sheet E | 1 | 2 | 3 | 4 | 5 | 6 | 7 | 8 | 9 | 10 | Final |
|---|---|---|---|---|---|---|---|---|---|---|---|
| Croatia (Turkovic) | 0 | 2 | 1 | 0 | 3 | 1 | 0 | 4 | X | X | 11 |
| Romania (Traila) | 1 | 0 | 0 | 1 | 0 | 0 | 1 | 0 | X | X | 3 |

==== Draw 7 ====
| Sheet A | 1 | 2 | 3 | 4 | 5 | 6 | 7 | 8 | 9 | 10 | Final |
|---|---|---|---|---|---|---|---|---|---|---|---|
| Lithuania (Paulauskaitė) | 0 | 1 | 0 | 0 | 1 | 0 | 0 | 2 | 0 | X | 4 |
| Belarus (Pavlyuchik) | 0 | 0 | 2 | 1 | 0 | 1 | 1 | 0 | 3 | X | 8 |

| Sheet B | 1 | 2 | 3 | 4 | 5 | 6 | 7 | 8 | 9 | 10 | Final |
|---|---|---|---|---|---|---|---|---|---|---|---|
| Spain (Otaegi) | 4 | 0 | 0 | 0 | 2 | 3 | 3 | X | X | X | 12 |
| Romania (Traila) | 0 | 1 | 1 | 2 | 0 | 0 | 0 | X | X | X | 4 |

| Sheet D | 1 | 2 | 3 | 4 | 5 | 6 | 7 | 8 | 9 | 10 | Final |
|---|---|---|---|---|---|---|---|---|---|---|---|
| Slovenia (Cerne) | 3 | 0 | 0 | 1 | 0 | 1 | 0 | 3 | 0 | 0 | 8 |
| Croatia (Turkovic) | 0 | 1 | 1 | 0 | 1 | 0 | 4 | 0 | 3 | 1 | 11 |

| Sheet E | 1 | 2 | 3 | 4 | 5 | 6 | 7 | 8 | 9 | 10 | Final |
|---|---|---|---|---|---|---|---|---|---|---|---|
| Austria (Ocker) | 0 | 0 | 0 | 3 | 0 | 3 | 1 | 2 | 4 | X | 13 |
| Ireland (Anderson) | 1 | 1 | 1 | 0 | 2 | 0 | 0 | 0 | 0 | X | 5 |

=== Playoffs ===
Second Place Game
2 | Austria | 3
3 | Lithuania | 7

Semifinals
1 | Belarus | 7
2 | Austria | 5
3 | Lithuania | 8
4 | Spain | 4

==== 1 vs. 2 ====
| Team | 1 | 2 | 3 | 4 | 5 | 6 | 7 | 8 | 9 | 10 | Final |
|---|---|---|---|---|---|---|---|---|---|---|---|
| Belarus (Pavlyuchik) | 1 | 1 | 0 | 2 | 0 | 0 | 0 | 1 | 0 | 2 | 7 |
| Austria (Ocker) | 0 | 0 | 2 | 0 | 0 | 1 | 1 | 0 | 1 | 0 | 5 |

Winner advances to Group B competitions.
Loser advances to Second Place Game.

==== 3 vs. 4 ====
| Team | 1 | 2 | 3 | 4 | 5 | 6 | 7 | 8 | 9 | 10 | Final |
|---|---|---|---|---|---|---|---|---|---|---|---|
| Lithuania (Paulauskaitė) | 0 | 2 | 1 | 0 | 0 | 0 | 0 | 3 | 1 | 1 | 8 |
| Spain (Otaegi) | 1 | 0 | 0 | 0 | 1 | 1 | 1 | 0 | 0 | 0 | 4 |

Winner advances to Second Place Game.

==== Second Place Game ====
| Team | 1 | 2 | 3 | 4 | 5 | 6 | 7 | 8 | 9 | 10 | Final |
|---|---|---|---|---|---|---|---|---|---|---|---|
| Austria (Ocker) | 1 | 0 | 0 | 0 | 0 | 0 | 1 | 0 | 1 | X | 3 |
| Lithuania (Paulauskaitė) | 0 | 1 | 1 | 0 | 0 | 3 | 0 | 2 | 0 | X | 7 |

Winner advances to Group B competitions.
