= Uliana Vasilyeva =

Russian curler

- Curler
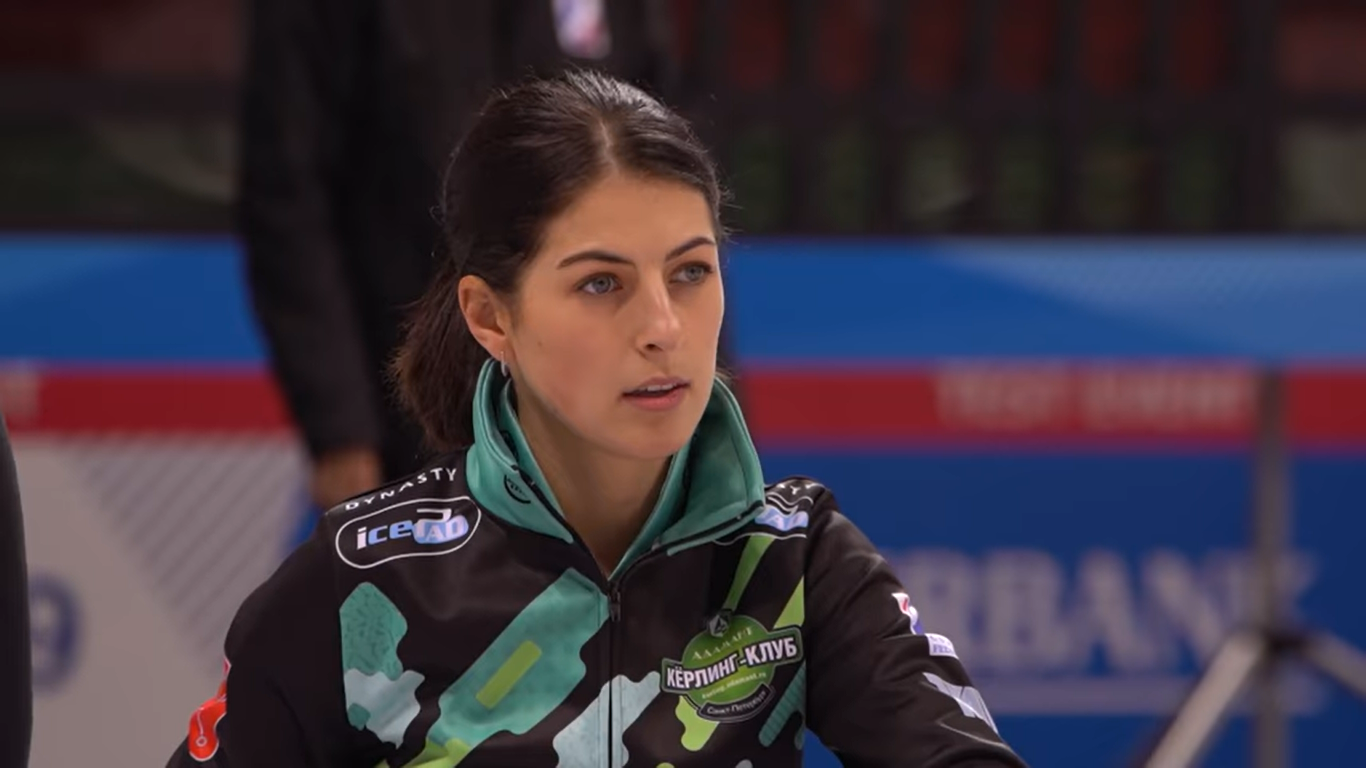
- Born: Uliana Yuryevna Vasilyeva; 31 July 1995 (age 31); St. Petersburg, Russia

Team
- Curling club: CC Adamant, St. Petersburg

Curling career
- Member Association: Russia
- World Championship: 1 (2019)
- European Championship: 2 (2016, 2018)
- Olympic: 1 (2018)
Medal record
Women's Curling
Representing Russia
European Curling Championships
Gold medal – first place	2016 Renfrewshire
Winter Universiade
Silver medal – second place	2017 Almaty
Bronze medal – third place	2019 Krasnoyarsk
World Junior Curling Championships
Bronze medal – third place	2014 Flims

Uliana Yuryevna Vasilyeva (Russian: Улья́на Ю́рьевна Васи́льева; born 31 July 1995) is a Russian curler. She played third for the Russian national women's curling team at the 2016 European Curling Championships, where she won a gold medal.

== Awards ==
- World Junior Curling Championships: Bronze (2014).
- Russian Women's Curling Championship: Gold (2019), Silver (2015), Bronze (2016).

== Personal life ==
Vasilyeva is a student of the St. Petersburg Specialized School of Olympic Reserve, No. 2 (technical school).

== Teammates ==
2016 European Curling Championships

- Victoria Moiseeva, Skip
- Galina Arsenkina, Second
- Julia Guzieva, Lead
- Yulia Portunova, Alternate
