= Julia Guzieva =

Russian curler (born 1988)

- Curler
- Born: Julia Viktorovna Guzieva; 18 December 1988 (age 37); Stepnogorsk, Kazakh SSR, Soviet Union

Team
- Curling club: CC Krasnodarsky Kray, Sochi
- Skip: Anna Sidorova
- Third: Julia Portunova
- Second: Olga Kotelnikova
- Lead: Julia Guzieva

Curling career
- Member Association: Russia
- World Championship: 1 (2018)
- European Championship: 1 (2016)
- Olympic: 1 (2018)
Medal record
Women's curling
Representing Russia
World Curling Championships
Bronze medal – third place	2018 North Bay
European Curling Championships
Gold medal – first place	2016 Renfrewshire

Julia Viktorovna Guzieva (Russian: Ю́лия Ви́кторовна Гузиё́ва; born 18 December 1988) is a Russian curler from Kaliningrad. She played lead for the Russia women's national curling team at the 2016 European Curling Championships.

== Awards ==
- Russian Women's Curling Championship: Silver (2014, 2016, 2019), Bronze (2012, 2013, 2015)
- Russian Women's SuperCup: Gold (2016)
- Russian Mixed Doubles Curling Cup: Bronze (2011)
- Master of Sports of Russia, International Class (2016)

== Teammates ==
2016 European Curling Championships

- Victoria Moiseeva, Fourth, Skip
- Uliana Vasilyeva, Third
- Galina Arsenkina, Second
- Yulia Portunova, Alternate
