= 2016 European Curling Championships =

- Host city: Braehead, Renfrewshire, Scotland
- Arena: Braehead Arena
- Dates: November 18–26
- Men's winner: Sweden
- Curling club: Karlstads CK, Karlstad
- Skip: Niklas Edin
- Third: Oskar Eriksson
- Second: Rasmus Wrana
- Lead: Christoffer Sundgren
- Finalist: Norway (Thomas Ulsrud)
- Women's winner: Russia
- Curling club: Adamant CC, Moscow
- Skip: Victoria Moiseeva
- Third: Uliana Vasileva
- Second: Galina Arsenkina
- Lead: Julia Guzieva
- Alternate: Yulia Portunova
- Finalist: Sweden (Anna Hasselborg)

The 2016 European Curling Championships were held from November 18 to 26 in Braehead, Renfrewshire, Scotland. Scotland last hosted the European Curling Championships in 2009 in Aberdeen. The Group C competitions will be held in April in Ljubljana, Slovenia.

At the conclusion of the championships, the top eight women's teams will go to the 2017 World Women's Curling Championship in Beijing, and the top eight men's teams will go to the 2017 Ford World Men's Curling Championship in Edmonton, Alberta, Canada.

== Men ==
=== Group A ===
The Group A competitions will be contested at the Braehead Arena in Renfrewshire.

==== Round-robin standings ====
Key
Teams to Playoffs
Teams relegated to 2017 Group B

Country	Skip	W	L
Sweden	Niklas Edin	8	1
Norway	Thomas Ulsrud	6	3
Switzerland	Peter de Cruz	6	3
Russia	Alexey Timofeev	6	3
Germany	Andreas Kapp	4	5
Scotland	Tom Brewster	4	5
Italy	Joel Retornaz	3	6
Austria	Sebastian Wunderer	3	6
Finland	Aku Kauste	3	6
Denmark	Rasmus Stjerne	2	7

==== Playoffs ====
Semifinals
1	Sweden	8
4	Russia	5
2	Norway	7
3	Switzerland	4

Final
1	Sweden	6
2	Norway	5

Bronze-medal game
4	Russia	6
3	Switzerland	8

==== Bronze-medal game ====
Friday, November 25, 19:00

Team	1	2	3	4	5	6	7	8	9	10	Final
Russia (Timofeev)	0	2	0	1	0	1	0	0	2	0	6
Switzerland (de Cruz)	2	0	2	0	1	0	2	0	0	1	8

==== Gold-medal game ====
Saturday, November 26, 15:00

Team	1	2	3	4	5	6	7	8	9	10	11	Final
Sweden (Edin)	1	0	0	1	1	0	0	0	2	0	1	6
Norway (Ulsrud)	0	1	0	0	0	2	0	0	0	2	0	5

=== Group B ===
==== Round-robin standings ====
Key
Teams to Playoffs
Teams to Tiebreaker
Teams to relegation Playoff

Pool A	Skip	W	L
Czech Republic	Karel Kubeška	6	1
Israel	Adam Freilich	5	2
Slovakia	Juraj Gallo	5	2
Turkey	Alican Karataş	5	2
Wales	Adrian Meikle	4	3
Lithuania	Tadas Vyskupaitis	2	5
France	Jean-Olivier Biechely	1	6
Spain	Lucas Munuera	0	7

Pool B	Skip	W	L
Netherlands	Jaap van Dorp	6	1
Latvia	Ritvars Gulbis	5	2
Hungary	Gergely Szabó	4	3
Poland	Borys Jasiecki	4	3
England	Alan MacDougall	4	3
Belgium	Timothy Verreycken	2	5
Estonia	Martin Lill	2	5
Slovenia	Štefan Sever	1	6

==== Relegation round ====
Relegation Finals
A7	France	3
B8	Slovenia	6

Relegation Semifinals
A7	France	3
B7	Estonia	7
A8	Spain	2
B8	Slovenia	5

==== Playoffs ====
Quarterfinals
B2	Latvia	5
A3	Slovakia	6
A2	Israel	8
B3	Poland	4

Semifinals
A1	Czech Republic	8
A3	Slovakia	9
B1	Netherlands	6
A2	Israel	2

Final
A3	Slovakia	6
B1	Netherlands	7

Bronze-medal game
A1	Czech Republic	10
A2	Israel	3

==== Bronze-medal game ====
Friday, November 25, 13:00

Team	1	2	3	4	5	6	7	8	9	10	Final
Czech Republic (Kubeška)	1	0	4	0	2	0	2	1	X	X	10
Israel (Freilich)	0	1	0	1	0	1	0	0	X	X	3

==== Gold-medal game ====
Friday, November 25, 13:00

Team	1	2	3	4	5	6	7	8	9	10	11	Final
Slovakia (Gallo)	0	0	1	2	0	1	0	0	1	1	0	6
Netherlands (van Dorp)	1	0	0	0	3	0	1	1	0	0	1	7

=== Group C ===
The Group C competitions will be contested at the Ledena Dvorana Zalog in Ljubljana.

==== Round-robin standings ====
Final Round Robin Standings

Key
Teams to Playoffs

Country	Skip	W	L
Estonia	Martin Lill	10	0
France	Jean-Olivier Biechely	7	3
Ireland	Andrew Gilmore	7	3
Bulgaria	Reto Seiler	7	3
Luxembourg	Marc Hansen	6	4
Belarus	Ilya Shalamitski	6	4
Serbia	Đorđe Nešković	5	5
Romania	Stefan Bodea	2	8
Croatia	Robert Mikulandric	2	8
Andorra	Josep Garcia	2	8
Iceland	Andri Magnusson	0	10

==== Playoffs ====
Second Place Game
2	France	7
3	Ireland	6

Semifinals
1	Estonia	7
2	France	4
3	Ireland	9
4	Bulgaria	6

==== 1 vs. 2 ====
Team	1	2	3	4	5	6	7	8	9	10	Final
Estonia (Lill)	0	1	0	0	2	0	0	4	0	X	7
France (Biechely)	0	0	1	0	0	1	1	0	1	X	4

Winner advances to Group B competitions.
Loser advances to Second Place Game.

==== 3 vs. 4 ====
Team	1	2	3	4	5	6	7	8	9	10	11	Final
Ireland (Gilmore)	1	2	0	0	2	0	0	1	0	0	3	9
Bulgaria (Seiler)	0	0	2	0	0	0	1	0	2	1	0	6

Winner advances to Second Place Game.

==== Second Place Game ====
Team	1	2	3	4	5	6	7	8	9	10	Final
France (Biechely)	0	0	0	2	2	1	0	0	2	0	7
Ireland (Gilmore)	0	0	3	0	0	0	1	1	0	1	6

Winner advances to Group B competitions.

== Women ==
=== Group A ===
The Group A competitions will be contested at the Braehead Arena in Renfrewshire.

==== Round-robin standings ====
Key
Teams to Playoffs
Teams relegated to 2017 Group B

Country	Skip	W	L
Scotland	Eve Muirhead	9	0
Sweden	Anna Hasselborg	8	1
Czech Republic	Anna Kubešková	6	3
Russia	Victoria Moiseeva	6	3
Denmark	Lene Nielsen	4	5
Switzerland	Binia Feltscher	4	5
Germany	Daniela Jentsch	4	5
Italy	Federica Apollonio	2	7
Norway	Kristin Skaslien	1	8
Finland	Anne Malmi	1	8

==== Playoffs ====
Semifinals
1	Scotland	6
4	Russia	11
2	Sweden	9
3	Czech Republic	2

Final
4	Russia	6
2	Sweden	4

Bronze-medal game
1	Scotland	6
3	Czech Republic	2

==== Bronze-medal game ====
Friday, November 25, 19:00

Team	1	2	3	4	5	6	7	8	9	10	Final
Scotland (Muirhead)	1	1	0	2	0	0	0	1	1	X	6
Czech Republic (Kubešková)	0	0	1	0	1	0	0	0	0	X	2

==== Gold-medal game ====
Saturday, November 26, 10:00

Team	1	2	3	4	5	6	7	8	9	10	Final
Russia (Moiseeva)	0	1	0	0	1	1	0	0	1	2	6
Sweden (Hasselborg)	2	0	0	1	0	0	0	1	0	0	4

=== Group B ===
==== Round-robin standings ====
Key
Teams to Playoffs
Teams to Tiebreaker
Teams relegated to 2017 Group C

Country	Skip	W	L
Hungary	Dorottya Palancsa	8	1
Turkey	Dilşat Yıldız	7	2
Estonia	Maile Mölder	7	2
Netherlands	Marianne Neeleman	5	4
England	Anna Fowler	5	4
Latvia	Santa Blumberga	5	4
Belarus	Alina Pauliuchyk	4	5
Lithuania	Virginija Paulauskaitė	2	7
Slovakia	Elena Axamitová	2	7
Poland	Marta Piuta	0	9

==== Playoffs ====
Semifinals
1	Hungary	9
4	Netherlands	8
2	Turkey	10
3	Estonia	2

Final
1	Hungary	6
2	Turkey	5

Bronze-medal game
3	Estonia	7
4	Netherlands	5

==== Bronze-medal game ====
Friday, November 25, 13:00

Team	1	2	3	4	5	6	7	8	9	10	Final
Estonia (Molder)	0	0	0	2	0	0	4	0	0	1	7
Netherlands (Neeleman)	1	0	1	0	1	0	0	1	1	0	5

==== Gold-medal game ====
Friday, November 25, 13:00

Team	1	2	3	4	5	6	7	8	9	10	Final
Hungary (Palancsa)	0	2	0	1	0	1	0	0	0	2	6
Turkey (Yıldız)	0	0	0	0	2	0	1	1	1	0	5

=== Group C ===
The Group C competitions were contested at the Ledena Dvorana Zalog in Ljubljana.

==== Round-robin standings ====
Final Round Robin Standings

Key
Teams to Playoffs

Country	Skip	W	L
Belarus	Alina Pauliuchyk	7	0
Austria	Constanze Ocker	5	2
Lithuania	Virginija Paulauskaitė	5	2
Spain	Oihane Otaegi	5	2
Croatia	Melani Turkovic	3	4
Slovenia	Nika Cerne	2	5
Ireland	Ailsa Anderson	1	6
Romania	Iulia Ioana Traila	0	7

==== Playoffs ====
Second Place Game
2	Austria	3
3	Lithuania	7

Semifinals
1	Belarus	7
2	Austria	5
3	Lithuania	8
4	Spain	4

==== 1 vs. 2 ====
Team	1	2	3	4	5	6	7	8	9	10	Final
Belarus (Pavlyuchik)	1	1	0	2	0	0	0	1	0	2	7
Austria (Ocker)	0	0	2	0	0	1	1	0	1	0	5

Winner advances to Group B competitions.
Loser advances to Second Place Game.

==== 3 vs. 4 ====
Team	1	2	3	4	5	6	7	8	9	10	Final
Lithuania (Paulauskaitė)	0	2	1	0	0	0	0	3	1	1	8
Spain (Otaegi)	1	0	0	0	1	1	1	0	0	0	4

Winner advances to Second Place Game.

==== Second Place Game ====
Team	1	2	3	4	5	6	7	8	9	10	Final
Austria (Ocker)	1	0	0	0	0	0	1	0	1	X	3
Lithuania (Paulauskaitė)	0	1	1	0	0	3	0	2	0	X	7

Winner advances to Group B competitions.
