= Russian Men's Curling Cup =

Annual Russian curling tournament for men

- Established: 2007
- 2023 host city: Sochi
- 2023 arena: Iceberg Skating Palace
- 2023 champion: Saint Petersburg 1 (Alexey Timofeev)

The Russian Men's Curling Cup (Russian: Кубок России по кёрлингу среди мужчин, Кубок России по кёрлингу среди мужских команд) is an annual national curling tournament for men's curling teams in Russia. It has been held annually since the 2007–2008 season (usually in October, November, or December). It is organized by the Russian Curling Federation. As of 2021, the event consisted of sixteen teams participating in a preliminary round robin and a single-knockout playoff.

== Past champions ==
Teams line-up in order: fourth, third, second, lead, alternate(s), coach(es); skips marked bold.

Year, dates	Host	Winning Team	Runner-up Team	Bronze Team
2007; 26—28 Oct	Moscow	EShVSM Moskvich 1 (Moscow); Alexander Kirikov	SKA 1 (Saint Petersburg); Valentin Demenkov	Moscow; Artem Bolduzev
2008; 24—26 Oct	Moscow	Moskvich (Moscow); Andrey Drozdov, Alexey Stukalskiy, Anton Kalalb, Vladimir Sobakin	EShVSM Moskvich 1 (Moscow); Alexander Kirikov, Vadim Shkolnikov, Alexey Kamnev, Dmitry Abanin	Lesgaftovets (Saint Petersburg); Anton Bobrov, Aleksandr Boiko, Vladimir Belmas, Aleksandr Orlov, alternate: Dmitry Melnikov
2009; 6—9 Nov	Dmitrov	Team Leningrad Oblast; Alexey Tselousov, Dmitri Ryzhov, Alexey Kamnev, Alexander Chugainov	EShVSM Moskvich 1 (Moscow); Alexander Kirikov, Vadim Shkolnikov, Roman Kutuzov, Aleksandr Kozyrev	Moskvich (Moscow); Andrey Drozdov, Alexey Stukalskiy, Anton Kalalb, Artem Bolduzev
2010; 4—7 Nov	Tver	Team Moscow; Jason Gunnlaugson, Justin Richter, Tyler Forrest, Alexey Stukalskiy, alternate: Aleksandr Kozyrev	Team Chelyabinsk Oblast 1 Artem Shmakov, Mikhail Bruskov, Sergey Glukhov, Dmitry Mironov, alternate: Alexander Zhitniak	EShVSM Moskvich 2 (Moscow); Vadim Stebakov, Vadim Raev, Sergey Manulychev, Alexander Chelyshev, alternate: Artur Ali
2011; 3—6 Nov	Tver	Yunost-Metar 1 (Chelyabinsk); Artem Shmakov, Mikhail Bruskov, Sergey Glukhov, Dmitry Mironov, alternate: Dmitry Solomatin	EShVSM Moskvich 1 (Moscow); Alexander Kirikov, Vadim Shkolnikov, Artem Bolduzev, Sergei Morozov, alternate: Aleksandr Kuzmin	Adamant 1 (Saint Petersburg); Alexey Tselousov, Petr Dron, Alexey Kamnev, Artur Razhabov, Alexander Badilin
2012	?? no data			
2013; 12—15 Dec	Sochi	SKA-ShVSM (Saint Petersburg); Alexander Krushelnitskiy, Ilya Badilin, Vladislav Goncherenko, Daniil Goriachev	Adamant 1 (Saint Petersburg); Alexey Tselousov, Artem Shmakov, Alexey Timofeev, Evgeny Klimov	Team Moscow 1 Alexander Kirikov, Vadim Shkolnikov, Vladimir Sobakin, Anton Kalalb
2014; 17—21 Dec	Sochi	ShVSM po ZVS 1 (Saint Petersburg); Alexander Krushelnitskiy	Adamant 1 (Saint Petersburg); Alexey Tselousov	Moskvich 2 (Moscow); Sergei Andrianov
2015; 16—20 Dec	Sochi	Adamant 1 (Saint Petersburg); Andrey Drozdov	Team Moscow 2 Alexander Kirikov	Team Moscow 1 Sergei Andrianov
2016; 3—8 Dec	Sochi	Adamant 2 (Saint Petersburg); Alexey Timofeev, Alexey Tselousov, Daniil Goriachev, Evgeny Klimov	Moscow Oblast 1 (Dmitrov); Alexander Eremin, Mikhail Vaskov, Alexey Tuzov, Alexey Kulikov, alternate: Kirill Savenkov	Adamant 1 (Saint Petersburg); Alexey Stukalskiy, Andrey Drozdov, Petr Dron, Anton Kalalb, alternate: Oleg Krasikov
2017; 15—21 Dec	Sochi	Moskvich-Raev (Moscow); Vadim Raev, Artyom Puzanov, Vasily Telezhkin, Nikolai Levashov	Adamant 1 (Saint Petersburg); Alexey Stukalskiy, Andrey Drozdov, Artur Razhabov, Petr Dron, alternate: Panteleimon Lappo	Team Moscow; German Doronin, Timur Gadzhikhanov, Sergei Andrianov, Vadim Golov, Danila Tsimbal
2018; 3—9 Dec	Sochi	Krasnodar Krai 1 (Sochi); Sergey Glukhov, Artur Ali, Dmitry Mironov, Anton Kalalb	Moskvich-MKK (Moscow); Vadim Raev, Evgeny Arkhipov, Artyom Puzanov, Nikolai Levashov, alternate: Andrei Shestopalov	Adamant 1 (Saint Petersburg); Alexey Timofeev, Alexey Stukalskiy, Artur Razhabov, Evgeny Klimov
2019; 2—6 Dec	Sochi	Krasnodar Krai (Sochi); Artur Ali, Dmitry Mironov, Arseniy Meshkovich, Stepan Sevryukov, alternate: Albert Topchyan	Komsomoll 1 (Irkutsk); Andrey Dudov, Artyom Karetnikov, Nikolai Lysakov, Mikhail Vlasenko, alternate: Kirill Grekhnyov	Novosibirsk Oblast; Artem Shmakov, Nikita Kukunin, Ivan Kazachkov, Daniil Zazulskikh
2020; 6—12 Oct	Dmitrov	Moscow Oblast 1 (Dmitrov); Alexander Eremin, Mikhail Vaskov, Alexey Tuzov, Alexey Kulikov, alternate: Kirill Savenkov, coaches: A.D. Gretskaya, D.N. Stepanov	Saint Petersburg 1 Alexey Timofeev, Daniil Goriachev, Evgeny Klimov, Artur Razhabov, alternate: Aleksandr Bystrov, coach: Anastasia Bryzgalova	Komsomoll 1 (Irkutsk); Andrey Dudov, Mikhail Vlasenko, Nikolai Lysakov, Kamil Karimov, coach: A.V. Trukhina
2021; 4—8 Dec	Sochi	Saint Petersburg 1 Artur Razhabov, Daniil Goriachev, Aleksandr Bystrov, Aleksandr Terentyev, alternate: Mikhail Andreev, coaches: A. Razhabov, I.V. Minin	Vorobyovy Gory 1 (Moscow); Alexander Kirikov, Vadim Shkolnikov, Dmitry Abanin, Sergei Morozov, alternate: Dmitry Isaev, coaches: S.Ya. Kalalb, V.R. Barabanschikova	Moscow Oblast 1 (Dmitrov); Alexander Eremin, Alexey Tuzov, Petr Kuznetsov, Alexey Kulikov, alternate: Kirill Savenkov, coaches: A.D. Gretskaya, D.N. Stepanov
2022; 4—8 Dec	Samara	Moscow Oblast 1 (Dmitrov); Mikhail Vaskov, Alexander Eremin, Alexey Tuzov, Alexey Kulikov, alternate: Pyotr Kuznetsov, coaches: A.D. Gretskaya	Komsomoll 1 (Irkutsk); Nikolay Lysakov, Mikhail Vlasenko, Kamil Karimov, Andrey Dudov, alternate: Danila Mukhorin, coaches: A.M. Dudov, E.V. Trukhina	Krasnodar Krai 1 (Sochi); Sergey Glukhov, Artur Ali, Evgeny Klimov, Anton Kalalb, alternate: Dmitry Mironov, coaches: A.N. Kozyrev, E.A. Zhidelev
2023; 4—8 Dec	Sochi	Saint Petersburg 1 Alexey Timofeev, Alexander Krushelnitskiy, Artur Razhabov, Daniil Goriachev, alternate: Evgeny Klimov, coaches: A. Bryzgalova, P.D. Dron	Krasnodar Krai 1 (Sochi); Dmitry Mironov, Sergey Glukhov, Arseny Meshkovich, Anton Kalalb, alternate: Artur Ali, coaches: E.A. Zhidelev, A.S. Kozyrev	Moscow Oblast 1 (Dmitrov); Mikhail Vaskov, Alexander Eremin, Alexey Tuzov, Alexey Kulikov, alternate: Pyotr Kuznetsov, coaches: A.D. Gretskaya

== See also ==
- Russian Men's Curling Championship
- Russian Women's Curling Cup
- Russian Mixed Curling Cup
- Russian Mixed Doubles Curling Cup
- Russian Wheelchair Curling Cup
- Russian Wheelchair Mixed Doubles Curling Cup
