= Russian Mixed Curling Cup =

National curling tournament in Russia

- Established: 2008
- 2023 host city: Novosibirsk
- 2023 arena: Penguin Curling Club
- 2023 champion: Novosibirsk Oblast 1 (Ivan Kazachkov)

The Russian Mixed Curling Cup (Russian: Кубок России по кёрлингу среди смешанных команд) are the annual national curling tournament for mixed curling in Russia. It has been held annually since 2008 (usually in August and/or September, it's an opening event in Russian mixed season), organized by Russian Curling Federation. As of 2023, the event consisted of sixteen teams participating in a preliminary round robin and a single-knockout playoff.

== Past champions ==
Year	Host	Winning Team	Runner-up Team	Bronze Team
2008	Dmitrov	Team Leningrad Oblast; Alexey Tselousov, Maria Malashina, Dmitry Ryzhov, A. Dolzhenko, alternates: Yu. Raspopov, A. Timofeeva	EShVSM Moskvich 2 (Moscow); Aleksandr Kozyrev, D. Kozlova, Alexey Kamnev, Yu. Svetova	SKA 1 (Saint Petersburg); Yana Nekrasova, V. Pechersky, N. Evert, S. Evert
2009	Dmitrov	Team Leningrad Oblast 1» Alexey Tselousov, Anna Kuntseva, Dmitry Ryzhov, Daria Yaschenko, alternate: Maria Malashina	ShVSM ZVS (Saint Petersburg); Valentin Demenkov, Victoria Moiseeva, Ivan Uledev, Maria Duyunova, alternate: Irina Kolesnikova	EShVSM Moskvich 1 (Moscow); Roman Kutuzov, Daria Kozlova, Aleksandr Kozyrev, Aleksandra Saitova, alternates: Victor Kornev, Anastasia Prokofieva
2010	Tver	EShVSM Moskvich 1 (Moscow); Liudmila Privivkova, Andrey Drozdov, Nkeirouka Ezekh, Artyom Bolduzev, alternates: Nadezhda Lepezina, Evgeny Arkhipov	Adamant 1 (Saint Petersburg); Alexey Tselousov, Alina Kovaleva, Alexey Kamnev, Yulia Zadorozhnaya, alternate: Evgeny Klimov	Albatros (Kaliningrad); Vitaly Karpinsky, Julia Guzieva, Sergei Belanov, Susanna Gefel, alternate: Leonid Rivkind
2011	Dmitrov	EShVSM Moskvich 1 (Moscow); Alexander Kirikov, Victoria Makarshina, Vadim Shkolnikov, Anna Lobova, alternate: Anton Kalalb	EShVSM Moskvich 2 (Moscow); Roman Kutuzov, Kira Ezekh, Vadim Raev, Ekaterina Galkina	Albatros (Kaliningrad); Olga Zharkova, Vitaly Karpinsky, Alisa Tregub, Leonid Rivkind
2012	Dmitrov	Albatros (Kaliningrad); Olga Zharkova, Leonid Rivkind, Yulia Portunova, Vitaly Karpinsky, alternate: Alisa Tregub	SDUSHOR Moskvich 3 (Moscow); Kira Ezekh	Saint Petersburg 2 Victoria Moiseeva
2013	Dmitrov	?? (no data in sources, except host city)		
2014	Sochi	Team Saint Petersburg 3 Victoria Moiseeva, Alexander Krushelnitskiy, Maria Duyunova, Ilya Badilin	Krasnodar Krai (Sochi); Olga Zharkova, Dmitry Mironov, Julia Guzieva, Aleksandr Kozyrev	Team Moscow 1 Alexander Kirikov, Victoria Makarshina, Dmitry Abanin, Anna Lobova, alternates: Vadim Shkolnikov, Valeria Sklyarenko
2015	Sochi	ShVSM po ZVS (Saint Petersburg); Alexander Krushelnitskiy	Team Saint Petersburg 5 Panteleimon Lappo	Team Saint Petersburg 1 Alexey Tselousov
2016	Dmitrov	Team Saint Petersburg 1 Alexander Krushelnitskiy	Team Saint Petersburg 2 Alexey Tselousov	Krasnodar Krai (Sochi); Sergey Glukhov
2017	Dmitrov	Saint Petersburg 2 Alexey Stukalskiy, Maria Ermeychuk, Oleg Krasikov, Aida Afanasieva	Moskvich 2 (Москва); Valeria Sklyarenko, Lev Puzakov, Irina Belyaeva, Vadim Golov	Saint Petersburg 1 Andrey Drozdov, Maria Baksheeva, Aleksandr Orlov, Maria Duyunova
2018	Sochi	Saint Petersburg 2 Alina Kovaleva, Alexey Timofeev, Uliana Vasilyeva, Evgeny Klimov	Saint Petersburg 1 Alexey Stukalskiy, Anastasia Khalanskaya, Danil Kiba, Aida Afanasieva	Moscow Oblast (Dmitrov); Mikhail Vaskov, Vlada Rumiantseva, Alexey Tuzov, Daria Morozova
2019	Dmitrov	Yenisey (Krasnoyarsk); Anna Venevtseva, Vasiliy Groshev, Vladislav Velichko, Christina Dudko	Saint Petersburg 2 Alexey Timofeev, Irina Nizovtseva, Evgeny Klimov, Vera Tiuliakova	Moscow Oblast 1 (Dmitrov); Alexander Eremin, Anastasia Moskaleva, Alexey Tuzov, Daria Morozova
2020	not held			
2021	Irkutsk	Irkutsk Oblast - Komsomoll 1 Elizaveta Trukhina, Nikolai Lysakov, Valeriia Denisenko, Mikhail Vlasenko	Yaroslavl Oblast» Vasily Telezhkin, Daria Semyonova, Aleksandr Utkin, Maria Belyaeva	Moskvich 2 (Moscow); German Doronin, Ksenia Novikova, Andrei Shestopalov, Arina Rusina
2022	Irkutsk	Saint Petersburg 3 Alexey Timofeev, Alina Kovaleva, Artur Razhabov, Ekaterina Kuzmina	Saint Petersburg 1 Oleg Krasikov, Nkeirouka Ezekh, Gleb Ljasnikov, Irina Nizovtseva	Novosibirsk Oblast; Ivan Kazachkov, Alexandra Stoyarosova, Konstantin Kozich, Arina Kiel
2023	Novosibirsk	Novosibirsk Oblast 1 Ivan Kazachkov, Alexandra Mozzherina, Daniel Zazulskikh, Arina Kiel	Irkutsk Oblast - Komsomoll 1 Valeriia Denisenko, Mikhail Vlasenko, Elizaveta Trukhina, Andrey Ilyin	Moscow Oblast 1 (Dmitrov); Mikhail Vaskov, Irina Ryazanova, Alexander Eremin, Anastasia Mishchenko
2024	Novosibirsk	Moscow Oblast 1 (Dmitrov); Mikhail Vaskov, Anastasia Moskaleva, Kirill Surovov, Anastasia Mishchenko	Novosibirsk Oblast 1 Alexandra Stoyarosova, Daniel Zazulskikh, Alexandra Mozzherina, Ruslan Chen-Shan	Irkutsk Oblast - Komsomoll 1 Nikolai Lysakov, Elizaveta Trukhina, Andrey Dudov, Alina Fakhurtdinova
2025	Novosibirsk	Irkutsk Oblast - Komsomoll 1 Valeria Denisenko, Nikolai Lysakov, Elizaveta Trukhina, Andrey Dudov	Moscow 1 Timofey Nasonov, Maria Tsebriy, Grigoriy Lavrov, Daria Tskhvedanashvili	Novosibirsk Oblast 2 Alexandra Stoyarosova, Daniel Zazulskikh, Alexandra Kazachkova, Lev Turchenko

== See also ==
- Russian Curling Championships
- Russian Mixed Curling Championship
- Russian Men's Curling Cup
- Russian Women's Curling Cup
- Russian Mixed Doubles Curling Cup
- Russian Wheelchair Curling Cup
- Russian Wheelchair Mixed Doubles Curling Cup
