= Russian Mixed Doubles Curling Cup =

- Established: 2008
- 2023 host city: Novosibirsk
- 2023 arena: Penguin Curling Club
- 2023 champion: Saint Petersburg 1 (Alina Kovaleva / Alexey Timofeev)

The Russian Mixed Doubles Curling Cup (Russian: Кубок России по кёрлингу среди смешанных пар, Кубок России по кёрлингу в дисциплине дабл-микст) are the annual national curling tournament for mixed doubles curling in Russia. It has been held annually since 2008 (usually in August and/or September, it's an opening event in Russian mixed doubles season), organized by Russian Curling Federation. As of 2023, the event consisted of twenty teams participating in a preliminary round robin and a single-knockout playoff.

== Past champions ==
Year	Host	Winning Team	Runner-up Team	Bronze Team
2008	Dmitrov	Moscow; Olga Zharkova / Dmitry Abanin	SKA 1 (Saint Petersburg); Maria Duyunova / Denis Yakovlev, alternate: Valentin Demenkov	Moskvich 2 (Moscow); Nadezhda Lepezina / Yevgeny Ryabishev, alternates: Vladimir Sobakin, Olga Lavrova
2009	Dmitrov	out of rank: Team Leningrad Oblast and Saint Petersburg; Yana Nekrasova / Alexey Kamnev; 1st place: «ShVSM ZVS 1»(Saint Petersburg); Ivan Uledev / Maria Duyunova, alternate: Petr Dron	Team Moscow; Yulia Svetova / Vladimir Sobakin	SDUSРOR Yunost-Metar (Chelyabinsk); Olga Zhuravleva / Mihail Bruskov
2010	Tver	Adamant 1 (Saint Petersburg); Oksana Gertova / Petr Dron	Yunost-Metar 2 (Chelyabinsk); Daria Yaschenko / Sergey Glukhov	Moskvich (Moscow); Nadezhda Lepezina / Vladimir Sobakin
2011	Dmitrov	Saint Petersburg 5 Nika Moiseeva / Alexandr Badilin	Moscow 2 Aleksandra Saitova / Roman Kutuzov	Kaliningrad 1 Julia Guzieva / Leonid Rivkind
2012	Dmitrov	Moscow Oblast 6 Daria Morozova / Alexander Eremin	SDYuShOR Moskvich 3 (Moscow); Victoria Makarshina / Aleksandr Kozyrev	SDYuShOR Moskvich 4 (Moscow); Nadezhda Lepezina / Yevgeny Tavirikov
2013	Dmitrov	Saint Petersburg 3 Elena Efimova / Alexey Timofeev	Saint Petersburg 1 Yana Nekrasova / Alexey Kamnev	Team Moscow; Alina Biktimirova / Vadim Raev
2014	Sochi	Saint Petersburg 1 Victoria Moiseeva / Alexander Krushelnitskiy	Saint Petersburg 7 Elena Efimova / Alexey Timofeev	Saint Petersburg 6 Alina Kovaleva / Alexey Tselousov
2015	Sochi	Saint Petersburg 6 Polina Bikker / Petr Dron	Moscow Oblast 2 Olga Kotelnikova / Alexey Kulikov	Team Moscow; Alina Biktimirova / Alexandr Kuzmin
2016	Dmitrov	Saint Petersburg 6 Veronika Teplyashina / Petr Dron	Moskvich 2 (Moscow); Мария Архипова / Timur Gadzhikhanov	Saint Petersburg 5 Arina Zasedateleva / Aleksandr Bystrov
2017	Dmitrov	Saint Petersburg 6 Polina Bikker / Petr Dron	Saint Petersburg 1 Anastasia Khalanskaya / Andrey Drozdov	Krasnodar Krai 1 (Sochi); Anastasia Ekskuzian / Nikita Ignatkov
2018	Sochi	Zekurion-Moskvich (Moscow); Alina Biktimirova / Timur Gadzhikhanov	Moscow Oblast 1 Daria Styoksova / Mikhail Vaskov	Saint Petersburg 1 Ольга Антонова / Petr Dron
2019	Dmitrov	Saint Petersburg 2 Irina Nizovtseva / Alexey Timofeev	Krasnodar Krai 1 Liudmila Privivkova / Artur Ali	Saint Petersburg 3 Vera Tulakova / Evgeny Klimov
2020	Dmitrov	Novosibirsk Oblast; Aleksandra Stoyarosova / Ivan Kazachkov	Moscow Oblast 3 Olga Kotelnikova / Alexey Kulikov	Moskvich (Moscow); Maria Tsebriy / Timofey Nasonov
2021	Irkutsk	Saint Petersburg 1 Nkeirouka Ezekh / Alexey Stukalskiy	ShVSM po ZVS (Saint Petersburg); Anastasia Babarykina / Konstantin Manasevich	Moscow Oblast 2 Anastasia Mischenko / Alexey Tuzov
2022	Irkutsk	Krasnoyarsk Krai 1 Christina Dudko / Vladislav Velichko	Irkutsk Oblast - Komsomoll 1 Elizaveta Trukhina / Nikolai Lysakov	Saint Petersburg 2 Nkeirouka Ezekh / Oleg Krasikov
2023	Novosibirsk	Saint Petersburg 2 Alina Kovaleva / Alexey Timofeev	Saint Petersburg 1 Nkeirouka Ezekh / Oleg Krasikov	Saint Petersburg 4 Anastasia Bryzgalova / Alexander Krushelnitskiy
2024	Novosibirsk	Moscow Oblast 1 Anastasia Moskaleva / Kirill Surovov	Moscow Oblast 2 Daria Morozova / Mikhail Vaskov	Irkutsk Oblast - Komsomoll 1 Elizaveta Trukhina / Nikolai Lysakov

== See also ==
- Russian Curling Championships
- Russian Mixed Doubles Curling Championship
- Russian Men's Curling Cup
- Russian Women's Curling Cup
- Russian Mixed Curling Cup
- Russian Wheelchair Curling Cup
- Russian Wheelchair Mixed Doubles Curling Cup
