= Artem Shmakov =

Russian curler

- Curler
- Born: 6 March 1990 (age 36); Chelyabinsk, Russia

Team
- Curling club: Adamant CC, Saint Petersburg
- Skip: Artem Shmakov
- Third: Ivan Kazachkov
- Second: Alexander Polushvayko
- Lead: Daniil Zazulskikh

Curling career
- Member Association: Russia
- World Championship: 2 (2016, 2018)
- European Championship: 1 (2017)
- Other appearances: European Junior Challenge: 1 (2011)
Medal record
Curling
Russian Men's Championship
Gold medal – first place	2013 Dmitrov
Gold medal – first place	2014 Sochi
Silver medal – second place	2015 Sochi
Bronze medal – third place	2012 Dmitrov & Saint Petersburg
Bronze medal – third place	2020 Sochi

Artem Shmakov (Russian: Артём Серге́евич Шма́ков; born 6 March 1990 in Chelyabinsk) is a Russian curler.

At the national level, he is a two-time Russian men's champion curler (2013, 2014) and a 2018 Russian mixed champion.

== Teams ==
=== Men's ===
Season	Skip	Third	Second	Lead	Alternate	Coach	Events
2010–11	Artem Shmakov	Evgeny Arkhipov	Sergey Glukhov	Alexander Badilin	Sergey Manulychev		EJCC 2011 (silver)
2011–12	Artem Shmakov	Sergey Glukhov	Dmitry Mironov	Mikhail Bruskov	Dmitry Solomatin		RMCCh 2012 (bronze)
2012–13	Alexey Tselousov	Artem Shmakov	Petr Dron	Mikhail Bruskov	Artur Razhabov		RMCCh 2013 (gold)
2013–14	Alexey Tselousov	Artem Shmakov	Alexey Timofeev	Evgeny Klimov			
2013–14	Alexey Tselousov	Artem Shmakov	Petr Dron	Evgeny Klimov	Alexey Timofeev		RMCCh 2014 (gold)
2014–15	Alexey Tselousov	Artem Shmakov	Alexey Timofeev	Evgeny Klimov			
2015–16	Alexey Tselousov	Artem Shmakov	Roman Kutuzov	Alexey Timofeev	Aleksandr Kozyrev	Sören Gran	WCC 2016 (10th)
2016–17	Artem Shmakov	Nikita Kukunin	Kirill Sedelnikov	Andrey Kuznetsov			RMCCh 2017 (14th)
2017–18	Alexey Timofeev	Artem Shmakov	Artur Razhabov	Evgeny Klimov	Sergey Glukhov	Aleksandr Kozyrev; Igor Minin	ECC 2017 (6th)
2017–18	Alexey Timofeev	Sergey Glukhov	Artur Razhabov	Evgeny Klimov	Artem Shmakov	Aleksandr Kozyrev	WCC 2018 (9th)
2017–18	Artem Shmakov	Ivan Kazachkov	Georgy Artemiev	Nikita Kukunin			RMCCh 2018 (16th)
2018–19	Artem Shmakov	Nikita Kukunin	Ivan Kazachkov	Daniil Zazulskih			RMCCh 2019 (12th)
2020–21	Artem Shmakov	Ivan Kazachkov	Alexander Polushvayko	Daniil Zazulskikh		Artem Shmakov	RMCCup 2020 (5th)

=== Mixed ===
Season	Skip	Third	Second	Lead	Alternate	Events
2007–08	Ekaterina Semendyaeva	A. Bulgakov	A. Sevostjanova	Artem Shmakov	A. Zhukova; D. Shvetsov	RMxCC 2008 (21st)
2009–10	Artem Shmakov	Daria Yashchenko	Sergey Glukhov	Marina Sogrina		RMxCC 2010 (5th)
2013–14	Artem Shmakov	Uliana Vasilyeva	Evgeny Klimov	Oksana Bogdanova		RMxCC 2014 (9th)
2017–18	Artem Shmakov	Ekaterina Kungurova	Nikita Kukunin	Aleksandra Stoyarosova		RMxCC 2018 (gold)
2020–21	Artem Shmakov	Aleksandra Stoyarosova	Ivan Kazachkov	Ekaterina Kungurova		RMxCC 2020 (bronze)

=== Mixed doubles ===
Season	Male	Female	Events
2011–12	Artem Shmakov	Daria Yashchenko	RMDCC 2012 (14th)
