= 2020 Russian Men's Curling Cup =

- Host city: Dmitrov, Moscow Oblast
- Arena: Palace of figure skating and curling
- Dates: October 6–12, 2020
- Winner: Moscow Oblast 1 (Alexander Eremin)
- Skip: Alexander Eremin
- Third: Mikhail Vaskov
- Second: Alexey Tuzov
- Lead: Alexey Kulikov
- Alternate: Kirill Savenkov
- Coach: Anna Gretskaya; Dmitry Stepanov
- Finalist: Saint Petersburg 1 (Alexey Timofeev)

The 2020 Russian Men's Curling Cup (Russian: Кубок России среди мужских команд 2020) was held from October 6 to 12, 2020 at the Palace of Figure Skating and Curling (Russian: Дворец фигурного катания и кёрлинга МУ СК «Дмитров») in Dmitrov, Moscow Oblast.

All games played are 8 ends.

All times are listed in Moscow Time (UTC+03:00)

== Teams ==
Team	Locale	Skip	Third	Second	Lead	Alternate	Coach
Chelyabinsk Oblast	Chelyabinsk	Mikhail Samorukov	Vyacheslav Mastrukov	Victor Altukhov	Nikita Moskvin	Anton Mishin	Olga Ponomaryova
(Irkutsk Oblast) Komsomoll 1	Irkutsk	Andrey Dudov (Fourth)	Mikhail Vlasenko (Skip)	Nikolai Lysakov	Kamil Karimov		Anna Trukhina
Krasnodar Krai	Sochi	Sergey Glukhov	Dmitry Mironov	Artur Ali	Anton Kalalb	Yegor Volkov	Aleksandr Kozyrev
Moscow Oblast 1	Dmitrov	Alexander Eremin	Mikhail Vaskov	Alexey Tuzov	Alexey Kulikov	Kirill Savenkov	Anna Gretskaya, Dmitry Stepanov
Moscow Oblast 2	Dmitrov	Kirill Surovov	Alexey Philippov	Petr Kuznetsov	Daniil Shmelev	Yuri Shustrov	Dmitry Stepanov, Anna Gretskaya
(Moscow) Moskvich 1	Moscow	German Doronin	Maksim Shibilkin	Dmitry Sirotkin	Daniil Fomin	Nikita Shekhirev	Olga Andrianova, Dmitry Andrianov
(Moscow) Moskvich 2	Moscow	Andrei Ilyin	Alexander Burdakov	Maxim Buylov	Alexander Gapanchuk	Alexander Chekanov	N. Petrova, Evgeny Arkhipov
(Moscow) Moskvich-MKK	Moscow	Vadim Raev	Daniil Voznyak	Artyom Puzanov	Sergei Andrianov	Nikolai Levashov	Olga Andrianova, Dmitry Andrianov
(Moscow) Moskvich-Novaya Liga	Moscow	Georgy Epremyan	Timophei Nasonov	Mikhail Golikov	Grigory Lavrov	Andrei Shestopalov	Olga Andrianova, Dmitry Andrianov
Novosibirsk Oblast	Novosibirsk	Artyom Shmakov	Ivan Kazachkov	Alexander Polushvayko	Daniil Zazulskikh		Artyom Shmakov
Saint Petersburg 1	Saint Petersburg	Alexey Timofeev	Daniil Goriachev	Evgeny Klimov	Artur Razhabov	Aleksandr Bystrov	Anastasia Bryzgalova
Saint Petersburg 2	Saint Petersburg	Aleksandr Orlov	Sergei Morozov	Vadim Shvedov	Nikita Ignatkov	Konstanin Manasevich	Dmitry Melnikov
Saint Petersburg 3	Saint Petersburg	Oleg Krasikov	Petr Dron	Sergei Varlamov	Danil Kiba	Matvei Vakin	Konstantin Zadvornov, Matvei Vakin
Saint Petersburg 4	Saint Petersburg	Gleb Lyasnikov	Artyom Bukarev	Dmitry Logvin	Alexander Terentjev	Alexey Stukalskiy	Konstantin Zadvornov, Matvei Vakin
Team Moscow	Moscow	Alexander Kirikov	Andrey Drozdov	Vadim Shkolnikov	Sergei Morozov	Dmitry Abanin	Svetlana Kalalb
(Krasnoyarsk Krai) Yenisei	Krasnoyarsk	Vasily Groshev	Danil Dmitriev	Alexander Khamushin	Valery Kochergin		A. Khamushin

== Round-robin standings ==
Final round-robin standings

Key
Teams to Playoffs

Group A	W	L
Saint Petersburg 1 (Timofeev)	7	0
Moscow Oblast 1 (Eremin)	6	1
Novosibirsk Oblast (Shmakov)	5	2
(Moscow Oblast) Moskvich 2 (Ilyin)	4	3
(Moscow) Moskvich 1 (Doronin)	3	4
Saint Petersburg 3 (Krasikov)	2	5
Chelyabinsk Oblast (Samorukov)	1	6
Saint Petersburg 4 (Lyasnikov)	0	7

Group B	W	L
Krasnodar Krai (Glukhov)	7	0
(Irkutsk Oblast) Komsomoll 1 (Vlasenko)	6	1
Moscow Oblast 2 (Surovov)	4	3
Saint Petersburg 2 (Orlov)	3	4
Team Moscow (Kirikov)	3	4
(Krasnoyarsk Krai) Yenisei (Groshev)	3	4
(Moscow) Moskvich-Novaya Liga (Epremyan)	1	6
(Moscow) Moskvich-MKK (Raev)	1	6

== Round-robin results ==
Key
Teams to Playoffs

Group A

	Team	Skip	А1	А2	А3	А4	А5	А6	А7	А8	Wins	Losses	Points	DSC (cm)	Place
А1	(Moscow) Moskvich 1	German Doronin	*	8:1	4:7	7:3	4:6	6:2	3:9	3:5	3	4	10	107.66	5
А2	Saint Petersburg 3	Oleg Krasikov	1:8	*	4:7	10:3	4:5	9:3	4:11	4:7	2	5	9	51.88	6
А3	Novosibirsk Oblast	Artyom Shmakov	7:4	7:4	*	6:3	3:5	6:3	4:6	7:5	5	2	12	52.49	3
А4	Saint Petersburg 4	Gleb Lyasnikov	3:7	3:10	3:6	*	4:6	4:7	0:6	0:8	0	7	7	94.69	8
А5	Saint Petersburg 1	Alexey Timofeev	6:4	5:4	5:3	6:4	*	7:4	6:3	6:3	7	0	14	75.55	1
А6	Chelyabinsk Oblast	Mikhail Samorukov	2:6	3:9	3:6	7:4	4:7	*	6:8	5:6	1	6	8	85.65	7
А7	Moscow Oblast 1	Alexander Eremin	9:3	11:4	6:4	6:0	3:6	8:6	*	7:3	6	1	13	27.36	2
А8	(Moscow) Moskvich 2	Andrei Ilyin	5:3	7:4	5:7	8:0	3:6	6:5	3:7	*	4	3	11	40.70	4

Group B

	Team	Skip	B1	B2	B3	B4	B5	B6	B7	B8	Wins	Losses	Points	DSC (cm)	Place
B1	(Krasnoyarsk Krai) Yenisei	Vasily Groshev	*	4:9	1:12	7:6	5:8	4:9	6:5	11:8	3	4	10	75.57	6
B2	Krasnodar Krai	Sergey Glukhov	9:4	*	8:6	9:3	5:4	7:6	8:2	5:2	7	0	14	46.52	1
B3	(Irkutsk Oblast) Komsomoll 1	Mikhail Vlasenko	12:1	6:8	*	4:2	5:2	4:2	6:4	7:3	6	1	13	42.48	2
B4	Team Moscow	Alexander Kirikov	6:7	3:9	2:4	*	8:2	1:8	10:3	6:3	3	4	10	55.26	5
B5	Saint Petersburg 2	Aleksandr Orlov	8:5	4:5	2:5	2:8	*	4:2	5:4	4:5	3	4	10	46.69	4
B6	Moscow Oblast 2	Kirill Surovov	9:4	6:7	2:4	8:1	2:4	*	9:3	7:5	4	3	11	55.03	3
B7	(Moscow) Moskvich-Novaya Liga	Georgy Epremyan	5:6	2:8	4:6	3:10	4:5	3:9	*	11:2	1	6	8	83.10	7
B8	(Moscow) Moskvich-MKK	Vadim Raev	8:11	2:5	3:7	3:6	5:4	5:7	2:11	*	1	6	8	68.99	8

Points: 2 for win, 1 for loss, 0 for technical loss (did not start)

== Playoffs ==
Semifinals
A(1)	Saint Petersburg 1 (Timofeev)	3
B(2)	(Irkutsk Oblast) Komsomoll 1 (Vlasenko)	2
B(1)	Krasnodar Krai (Glukhov)	6
A(2)	Moscow Oblast 1 (Eremin)	7

Final
A(1)	Saint Petersburg 1 (Timofeev)	6
A(2)	Moscow Oblast 1 (Eremin)	7
Third place game
B(2)	(Irkutsk Oblast) Komsomoll 1 (Vlasenko)	5
B(1)	Krasnodar Krai (Glukhov)	1

=== Semifinals ===
Sunday, October 11, 7:20 pm

Sheet B	1	2	3	4	5	6	7	8	9	Final
Moscow Oblast 1 (Eremin)	0	2	1	0	1	0	0	2	1	7
Krasnodar Krai (Glukhov)	2	0	0	0	0	3	1	0	0	6

Sheet C	1	2	3	4	5	6	7	8	Final
Saint Petersburg 1 (Timofeev)	0	0	0	1	1	0	0	1	3
(Irkutsk Oblast) Komsomoll 1 (Vlasenko)	0	0	1	0	0	1	0	0	2

=== Third place game ===
Monday, October 12, 10:00 am

Sheet B	1	2	3	4	5	6	7	8	Final
(Irkutsk Oblast) Komsomoll 1 (Vlasenko)	0	0	0	0	2	1	2	X	5
Krasnodar Krai (Glukhov)	0	1	0	0	0	0	0	X	1

=== Final ===
Monday, October 12, 10:00 am

Sheet C	1	2	3	4	5	6	7	8	9	Final
Saint Petersburg 1 (Timofeev)	0	1	0	0	1	1	0	3	0	6
Moscow Oblast 1 (Eremin)	1	0	2	0	0	0	3	0	0	7

== Final standings ==
Place	Team	Skip	Games	Wins	Losses	Place after RR	DSC (cm)
1st place, gold medalist(s)	Moscow Oblast 1	Alexander Eremin	9	8	1	2	27.36
2nd place, silver medalist(s)	Saint Petersburg 1	Alexey Timofeev	9	8	1	1	75.55
3rd place, bronze medalist(s)	(Irkutsk Oblast) Komsomoll 1	Mikhail Vlasenko	9	7	2	2	42.48
4	Krasnodar Krai	Sergey Glukhov	9	7	2	1	46.52
5	Novosibirsk Oblast	Artyom Shmakov	7	5	2	3	52.49
6	Moscow Oblast 2	Kirill Surovov	7	4	3	3	55.03
7	(Moscow) Moskvich 2	Andrei Ilyin	7	4	3	4	40.70
8	Saint Petersburg 2	Aleksandr Orlov	7	3	4	4	46.69
9	Team Moscow	Alexander Kirikov	7	3	4	5	55.26
10	(Moscow) Moskvich 1	German Doronin	7	3	4	5	107.66
11	Saint Petersburg 3	Oleg Krasikov	7	2	5	6	51.88
12	(Krasnoyarsk Krai) Yenisei	Vasily Groshev	7	3	4	6	75.57
13	(Moscow) Moskvich-Novaya Liga	Georgy Epremyan	7	1	6	7	83.10
14	Chelyabinsk Oblast	Mikhail Samorukov	7	1	6	7	85.65
15	(Moscow) Moskvich-MKK	Vadim Raev	7	1	6	8	68.99
16	Saint Petersburg 4	Gleb Lyasnikov	7	0	7	8	94.69

== See also ==
- 2020 Russian Women's Curling Cup
