= 2020 Russian Mixed Curling Championship =

- Host city: Dmitrov, Moscow Oblast
- Arena: Palace of figure skating and curling
- Dates: September 5–11
- Winner: Saint Petersburg 3
- Skip: Alexey Timofeev
- Third: Irina Nizovtseva
- Second: Evgeny Klimov
- Lead: Nadezhda Belyakova
- Finalist: Moscow Oblast 1 (Alexander Eremin)

The 2020 Russian Mixed Curling Championship (Russian: Чемпионат России по кёрлингу среди смешанных команд 2020) were held from September 5 to 11 at the Palace of Figure Skating and Curling in Dmitrov, Moscow Oblast.

== Teams ==
	Team	Locale	Skip	Third	Second	Lead
Group A
A1	Yenisei	Krasnoyarsk	Vasily Groshev (4th)	Anna Samoylik (skip)	Vladislav Velichko	Kristina Dudko
A2	Saint Petersburg 3	Saint Petersburg	Alexey Timofeev	Irina Nizovtseva	Evgeny Klimov	Nadezhda Belyakova
A3	Saint Petersburg 1	Saint Petersburg	Alexey Stukalskiy	Maria Ermeychuk	Petr Dron	Anastasiya Khalanskaya
A4	Kaliningrad 1	Kaliningrad	Alisa Miroshnichenko	Dmitrij Uporov	Violeta Nipers	Pavel Kolobuhov
A5	Saint Petersburg 5	Saint Petersburg	Alexander Orlov	Anastasiya Babarykina	Sergej Morozov	Anastasiya Belikova
A6	Samara Oblast 1	Samara	Polina Bogatova (4th)	Valentin Usenko	Irina Bezprizornova (skip)	Ivan Sherstnyov
A7	Samara Oblast 2	Samara	Timofej Kusneev (4th)	Anna Salnikova	Yaroslav Trofimenko (skip)	Sofiya Bogatova
A8	Moscow Oblast 2	Dmitrov	Mikhail Vaskov (4th)	Vlada Rumiantseva (skip)	Petr Kuznetsov	Anastasiya Mishchenko
Group B
B1	Yaroslavl Oblast	Yaroslavl	Vasily Telezhkin	Daria Semyonova	Mihail Lebedev	Elizaveta Belova
B2	Team Moscow	Moscow	Maksim Shibilkin	Lolita Tretiyak	Nikita Shekhirev	Arina Rusina
B3	Saint Petersburg 2	Saint Petersburg	Artur Razhabov	Maria Drozdova	Danil Kiba	Margarita Evdokimova
B4	Tatarstan	Kazan	Bogdan Shestopalov	Anastasiya Sushkova	Maksim Ivanov	Anastasiya Kryuchkova
B5	Moscow Oblast 1	Dmitrov	Alexander Eremin	Anastasia Moskaleva	Alexey Tuzov	Daria Morozova
B6	Saint Petersburg 4	Saint Petersburg	Daniil Goriachev	Aleksandra Antonova	Aleksandr Bystrov	Arina Zasedateleva
B7	Novosibirsk Oblast	Novosibirsk	Artem Shmakov	Aleksandra Stoyarosova	Ivan Kazachkov	Ekaterina Kungurova
B8	Komsomoll 1	Irkutsk	Elizaveta Truhina	Nikolaj Lysakov	Nina Polikarpova	Mihail Vlasenko

== Round robin ==
=== Group A ===
	Team (Skip)	A1	A2	A3	A4	A5	A6	A7	A8	Wins	Losses	Points	DSC, cm	Place
A1	Yenisei (Anna Samoylik)	*	4:11	3:5	3:6	7:5	8:6	7:2	4:8	3	4	10	46,43	4
A2	Saint Petersburg 3 (Alexey Timofeev)	11:4	*	7:2	12:2	7:6	7:2	5:3	7:4	7	0	14	35,73	1
A3	Saint Petersburg 1 (Alexey Stukalskiy)	5:3	2:7	*	10:2	7:6	8:6	8:5	7:8	4	3	11	42,35	3
A4	Kaliningrad 1 (Alisa Miroshnichenko)	6:3	2:12	2:10	*	5:6	6:4	11:2	4:5	3	4	10	52,94	5
A5	Saint Petersburg 5 (Alexander Orlov)	5:7	6:7	6:7	6:5	*	5:4	9:3	3:6	3	4	10	70,83	6
A6	Samara Oblast 1 (Irina Bezprizornova)	6:8	2:7	6:8	4:6	4:5	*	7:3	3:9	1	6	8	89,30	7
A7	Samara Oblast 2 (Yaroslav Trofimenko)	2:7	3:5	5:8	2:11	3:9	3:7	*	4:8	0	7	7	82,93	8
A8	Moscow Oblast 2 (Vlada Rumiantseva)	8:4	4:7	8:7	5:4	6:3	9:3	8:4	*	6	1	13	75,46	2

=== Group B ===
	Team (Skip)	B1	B2	B3	B4	B5	B6	B7	B8	Wins	Losses	Points	DSC, cm	Place
B1	Yaroslavl Oblast (Vasily Telezhkin)	*	6:2	3:5	6:4	2:10	4:5	2:6	2:8	2	5	9	79,13	6
B2	Team Moscow (Maksim Shibilkin)	2:6	*	5:6	12:1	2:7	7:6	6:7	4:6	2	5	9	51,50	7
B3	Saint Petersburg 2 (Artur Razhabov)	5:3	6:5	*	15:1	0:8	4:3	9:6	2:5	5	2	12	36,65	3
B4	Tatarstan (Bogdan Shestopalov)	4:6	1:12	1:15	*	4:8	3:7	1:12	6:9	0	7	7	76,29	8
B5	Moscow Oblast 1 (Alexander Eremin)	10:2	7:2	8:0	8:4	*	5:2	6:5	5:8	6	1	13	40,03	1
B6	Saint Petersburg 4 (Daniil Goriachev)	5:4	6:7	3:4	7:3	2:5	*	3:5	6:4	3	4	10	74,74	5
B7	Novosibirsk Oblast (Artem Shmakov)	6:2	7:6	6:9	12:1	5:6	5:3	*	8:6	5	2	12	23,04	2
B8	Komsomoll 1 (Elizaveta Truhina)	8:2	6:4	5:2	9:6	8:5	4:6	6:8	*	5	2	12	43,74	4

Teams to playoffs
Points: 2 for win, 1 for loss, 0 for technical loss (did not start)

== Playoffs ==
Semi-finals
A-1	Saint Petersburg 3 (Timofeev)	8
B-2	Novosibirsk Oblast (Shmakov)	3
B-1	Moscow Oblast 1 (Eremin)	6
A-2	Moscow Oblast 2 (Rumiantseva)	4

Final
Saint Petersburg 3 (Timofeev)	7
Moscow Oblast 1 (Eremin)	3
Bronze medal game
Novosibirsk Oblast (Shmakov)	5
Moscow Oblast 2 (Rumiantseva)	3

Semi-finals
September 10, 9:00

Sheet B	1	2	3	4	5	6	7	8	Final
(A-2) Moscow Oblast 2 (Rumiantseva)	0	1	1	0	1	1	0	0	4
(B-1) Moscow Oblast 1 (Eremin) 🔨	1	0	0	2	0	0	2	1	6

Sheet D	1	2	3	4	5	6	7	8	Final
(B-2) Novosibirsk Oblast (Shmakov)	0	1	0	1	0	1	0	0	3
(A-1) Saint Petersburg 3 (Timofeev) 🔨	3	0	1	0	0	0	1	3	8

Bronze medal game
September 10, 14:00

Sheet B	1	2	3	4	5	6	7	8	Final
(B-2) Novosibirsk Oblast (Shmakov)	0	2	0	0	3	0	0	X	5
(A-2) Moscow Oblast 2 (Rumiantseva) 🔨	0	0	1	0	0	0	2	X	3

Final
September 10, 14:00

Sheet C	1	2	3	4	5	6	7	8	Final
(B-1) Moscow Oblast 1 (Eremin)	0	1	0	1	1	0	0	X	3
(A-1) Saint Petersburg 3 (Timofeev) 🔨	3	0	1	0	0	2	1	X	7

== Final standings ==
Place	Team	Skip	Games played	Wins	Losses	Place after RR	DSC, cm
1st place, gold medalist(s)	Saint Petersburg 3	Alexey Timofeev	9	9	0	1	35,73
2nd place, silver medalist(s)	Moscow Oblast 1	Alexander Eremin	9	7	2	1	40,03
3rd place, bronze medalist(s)	Novosibirsk Oblast	Artem Shmakov	9	6	3	2	23,04
4	Moscow Oblast 2	Vlada Rumiantseva	9	6	3	2	75,46
5	Saint Petersburg 2	Artur Razhabov	7	5	2	3	36,65
6	Saint Petersburg 1	Alexey Stukalskiy	7	4	3	3	42,35
7	Komsomoll 1 (Irkutsk)	Elizaveta Truhina	7	5	2	4	43,74
8	Yenisei (Krasnoyarsk)	Anna Samoylik	7	3	4	4	46,43
9	Kaliningrad 1	Alisa Miroshnichenko	7	3	4	5	52,94
10	Saint Petersburg 4	Daniil Goriachev	7	3	4	5	74,74
11	Saint Petersburg 5	Alexander Orlov	7	3	4	6	70,83
12	Yaroslavl Oblast	Vasily Telezhkin	7	2	5	6	79,13
13	Team Moscow	Maksim Shibilkin	7	2	5	7	51,50
14	Samara Oblast 1	Irina Bezprizornova	7	1	6	7	89,30
15	Tatarstan	Bogdan Shestopalov	7	0	7	8	76,29
16	Samara Oblast 2	Yaroslav Trofimenko	7	0	7	8	82,93

== See also ==
- 2020 Russian Men's Curling Championship
- 2020 Russian Women's Curling Championship
- 2020 Russian Mixed Doubles Curling Championship
- 2020 Russian Junior Curling Championships
- 2020 Russian Wheelchair Curling Championship
