= Vasily Telezhkin =

Russian male curler and curling coach

- Curler
- Born: 19 April 1994 (age 32); Moscow, Russia

Curling career
- Member Association: Russia
Medal record
Russian Men's Cup
| Gold medal – first place | 2017 |

Vasily Telezhkin (Russian: Васи́лий Евге́ньевич Теле́жкин; born 19 April 1994 in Moscow, Russia) is a Russian curler and curling coach from Moscow.

He is Master of Sports of Russia.

Vasily is one of co-founders of not-professional curling development project called "Russian Curling League".

He is creator and chief editor of Telegram channel "Curlingnews".

== Teams ==
=== Men's ===
| Season | Skip | Third | Second | Lead | Alternate | Events |
|---|---|---|---|---|---|---|
| 2013–14 | Vasily Telezhkin | Alexander Eremin | Dmitry Antipov | Alexey Tuzov | Alexander Chistov | RMCCup 2013 (4th) |
| 2014–15 | Vasily Telezhkin | ? | ? | ? | | RJCCh 2015 (silver) |
| 2016–17 | Vadim Raev | Vasily Telezhkin | Artyom Puzanov | Lev Puzakov | | RMCCh 2017 (7th) |
| 2017–18 | Vadim Raev | Nikolay Levashev | Vasily Telezhkin | Artyom Puzanov | Andrey Suvorov (RMCCh) | RMCCup 2017 (gold); RMCCh 2018 (7th) |

=== Mixed ===
| Season | Skip | Third | Second | Lead | Alternate | Events |
|---|---|---|---|---|---|---|
| 2011–12 | Vasily Telezhkin | Daria Morozova | Pavel Mishin | Olga Kotelnikova | Alexander Eremin | RMxCCh 2012 (11th) |
| 2012–13 | Vasily Telezhkin | ? | ? | ? | | RMxCCup 2012 (9th) |
| 2012–13 | Vasily Telezhkin | Daria Morozova | Alexey Kulikov | Anna Gretskaya | | RMxCCh 2013 (4th) |
| 2013–14 | Vasily Telezhkin | Daria Morozova | Alexey Kulikov | Marina Vdovina | Alexey Tuzov | RMxCCh 2014 (bronze) |
| 2014–15 | Vasily Telezhkin | Daria Morozova | Alexey Kulikov | Marina Vdovina | | RMxCCup 2014 (7th) |
| 2014–15 | Vasily Telezhkin | Anastasia Moskaleva | ? | ? | | RMxCCh 2015 (5th) |
| 2015–16 | Vasily Telezhkin | ? | ? | ? | | RMxCCh 2016 (9th) |
| 2020–21 | Vasily Telezhkin | Daria Semyonova | Mihail Lebedev | Elizaveta Belova | | RMxCCh 2020 (12th) |

=== Mixed doubles ===
| Season | Male | Female | Events |
|---|---|---|---|
| 2011–12 | Vasily Telezhkin | Olga Kotelnikova | RMDCCh 2012 (17th) |
| 2012–13 | Vasily Telezhkin | Olga Kotelnikova | RMDCCup 2012 (9th) |
| 2012–13 | Vasily Telezhkin | Marina Verenich | RMDCCh 2013 (9th) |
| 2013–14 | Vasily Telezhkin | Marina Vdovina | RMDCCup 2013 (9th) |
| 2014–15 | Vasily Telezhkin | Ekaterina Kukleva | RMDCCh 2015 (13th) |
| 2015–16 | Vasily Telezhkin | Daria Styoksova | RMDCCup 2015 (13th) |
| 2015–16 | Vasily Telezhkin | Marina Verenich | RMDCCh 2016 (17th) |
| 2021–22 | Vasily Telezhkin | Daria Semenova | RMDCCup 2021 (17th) |

== Record as a coach of national teams ==
| Year | Tournament, event | National team | Place |
|---|---|---|---|
| 2018 | 2018 European Curling Championships | Belarus (men) | 15 |
| 2018 | 2018 European Curling Championships | Belarus (women) | 22 |
| 2019 | 2019 World Mixed Doubles Curling Championship | Belarus (mixed doubles) | 28 |
