= Aleksandr Orlov (curler) =

Russian male curler and curling coach

Aleksandr Orlov Алекса́ндр Орло́в
- Curler
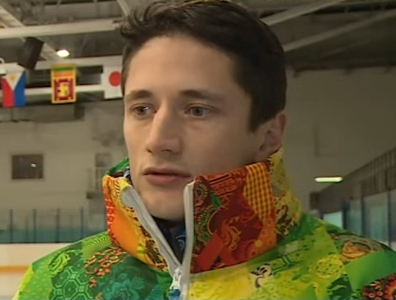
- Aleksandr Orlov in December 2016
- Born: 18 January 1983 (age 43); Bratsk, Irkutsk Oblast, Russia

Team
- Curling club: ShVSM po ZVS, Saint Petersburg
- Skip: Aleksandr Orlov
- Third: Sergei Morozov
- Second: Vadim Shvedov
- Lead: Nikita Ignatkov
- Alternate: Kostanin Manasevich

Curling career
- Member Association: Russia (2007–2012; 2015–present); Kazakhstan (2012–2015)
- World Mixed Doubles Championship: 1 (2014)
- Pacific-Asia Championship: 2 (2012, 2014)
Medal record
Representing Russia
Russian Men's Championship
Silver medal – second place	2009
Russian Mixed Championship
Gold medal – first place	2013
Gold medal – first place	2021
World Winter Masters Games (mixed curling)
Gold medal – first place	2020
Representing Kazakhstan
Kazakhstan Men's Championship
Gold medal – first place	2012
Kazakhstan Mixed Doubles Championship
Gold medal – first place	2012
Gold medal – first place	2014

Aleksandr Anatolyevich Orlov (Russian: Алекса́ндр Анато́льевич Орло́в; born 18 January 1983 in Bratsk, Irkutsk Oblast, Russia) is a Russian curler and curling coach.

He is Master of Sports of Russia of International Class (curling, 2016).

From 2012 to 2021, Orlov worked as a coach of the national teams of Kazakhstan, Belarus, and Ukraine. Since August 2025, he has been working as a National Coach for Qatar Curling.

He is a sports journalist, founder and owner of a biggest non-governing Russian curling site "CurlingRussia" ("Кёрлинг в России (Curling in Russia)", temporary closed in 2020).

He is founder and owner of the first Russian curling equipment shop "All for curling" (Russian: Всё для кёрлинга).

== Teams ==
=== Men's ===
Season	Skip	Third	Second	Lead	Alternate	Coach	Events
2007–08	Anton Bobrov	Petr Dron	Dmitry Melnikov	Alexander Boyko	Aleksandr Orlov		RMCCh 2008 (5th)
2008–09	Aleksandr Orlov	?	?	?			RMCCh 2009 (silver)
2009–10	Anton Bobrov	Alexander Boyko	Aleksandr Orlov	Artur Razhabov			
2009–10	Anton Bobrov	Alexander Boyko	Aleksandr Orlov	Vladimir Beljmas	Alexander Badilin		RMCCh 2010 (5th)
2012–13	Aleksandr Orlov (4th)	Viktor Kim (skip)	Daniel Alex Kim	Ilya Kuznetsov	Marat Smailov		(Kazakhstan); PACC 2012 (7th)
2014–15	Viktor Kim	Aleksandr Orlov	Ilya Kuznetsov	Muzdybay Kudaibergenov	Abylaikhan Zhuzbay	Viktor Kim	(Kazakhstan); PACC 2014 (7th)
2016–17	Aleksandr Orlov	Alexander Boyko	Vladislav Goncharenko	Viktor Vorobyov	Nikolay Cherednichenko		
2016–17	Aleksandr Orlov	Alexander Boyko	Vladislav Goncharenko	Viktor Vorobyov	Pavel Kolobuhov		RMCCh 2017 (9th)
2020–21	Aleksandr Orlov	Sergei Morozov	Vadim Shvedov	Nikita Ignatkov	Konstanin Manasevich	Dmitry Melnikov	RMCCup 2020 (8th)
2020–21	Aleksandr Orlov	Sergei Morozov	Vadim Shvedov	Konstanin Manasevich	Nikita Ignatkov	Alexander Boyko, Dmitry Melnikov	RMCCh 2021 (6th)
2021–22	Konstanin Manasevich (fourth)	Aleksandr Orlov (skip)	Vadim Shvedov	Georgy Vasilevsky	Daniil Sokolov	Dmitry Melnikov	RMCCh 2022 (7th)

=== Mixed ===
Season	Skip	Third	Second	Lead	Alternate	Coach	Events
2006–07	Aleksandr Orlov	?	?	?			RMxCCh 2007 (13th)
2007–08	Svetlana Yakovleva	Aleksandr Orlov	Oksana Gertova	Alexander Badilin			RMxCCh 2008 (17th)
2008–09	Denis Yakovlev	Anna Mylnikova	Aleksandr Orlov	Maria Duyunova		Irina Kolesnikova, Konstantin Zadvornov, M. Cherepanov	RMxCCup 2008 (4th)
2008–09	Aleksandr Orlov (4th)	Svetlana Yakovleva (skip)	Ilya Badilin	Ekaterina Ilinykh		Konstantin Zadvornov, Svetlana Yakovleva	RMxCCh 2009 (19th)
2009–10	Yana Nekrasova	Aleksandr Orlov	Irina Kolesnikova	Nikita Pershakov	Alyona Borisova		RMxCCh 2010 (8th)
2010–11	Yana Nekrasova	Aleksandr Orlov	Victoria Moiseeva	Alexander Boyko	Maria Duyunova		RMxCCh 2011 (4th)
2011–12	Yana Nekrasova	Aleksandr Orlov	Maria Duyunova	Ivan Uledev	Victoria Moiseeva		RMxCCup 2011 (5th)
2011–12	Yana Nekrasova	Aleksey Kamnev	Victoria Moiseeva	Aleksandr Orlov	Maria Duyunova		RMxCCh 2012 (6th)
2012–13	Anders Kraupp	Vita Moiseeva	Aleksandr Orlov	Maria Duyunova	Vladislav Goncharenko		RMxCCh 2013 (gold)
2013–14	Alexander Krushelnitskiy	Victoria Moiseeva	Aleksandr Orlov	Maria Duyunova	Ilya Badilin		RMxCCh 2014 (5th)
2017–18	Andrey Drozdov	Maria Baksheeva	Aleksandr Orlov	Maria Duyunova			RMxCCup 2017 (bronze)
2018–19	Aleksandr Orlov	Anastasiya Babarykina	Vadim Shvedov	Alexandra Antonova			RMxCCh 2019 (8th)
2019–20	Aleksandr Orlov	Anastasiya Babarykina	Vadim Shvedov	Alexandra Antonova			RMxCCup 2019 (4th)
2019–20	Aleksandr Orlov	Anastasiya Babarykina	Sergej Morozov	Anastasiya Belikova			RMxCCh 2020 (11th)
2020–21	Konstanin Manasevich (fourth)	Anastasiya Babarykina	Aleksandr Orlov (skip)	Anastasiya Belikova		Yana Garshina	RMxCCh 2021 (gold)
2021–22	Konstanin Manasevich (fourth)	Anastasiya Babarykina	Aleksandr Orlov (skip)	Anastasiya Belikova		Yana Garshina	RMxCCup 2021 (11th)

=== Mixed doubles ===
Season	Male	Female	Alternate	Coach	Events
2007–08	Svetlana Yakovleva	Aleksandr Orlov	Oksana Gertova		RMDCCh 2007 (9th)
2008–09	Svetlana Yakovleva	Aleksandr Orlov	Oksana Gertova	Konstantin Zadvornov, Svetlana Yakovleva	RMDCCup 2008 (5th)
2011–12	Yana Nekrasova	Aleksandr Orlov			RMDCCup 2011 (5th)
2013–14	Maria Duyunova	Aleksandr Orlov			RMDCCh 2014 (11th)
2013–14	Olga Ten	Aleksandr Orlov		Viktor Kim	(Kazakhstan); WMDCC 2014 (28th)

== Record as a coach of national teams ==
Year	Tournament, event	National team	Place
2012	2012 Pacific-Asia Curling Championships	Kazakhstan (women)	6
2016	2016 World Mixed Doubles Curling Championship	Belarus (mixed doubles)	26
2016	2016 World Mixed Curling Championship	Belarus (mixed)	27
2016	2016 European Curling Championships	Belarus (women)	17
2017	2017 European Curling Championships	Belarus (women)	20
2019	2019 World Mixed Curling Championship	Belarus (mixed)	17
2019	2019 World Mixed Curling Championship	Belarus (women)	18
2021	2021 European Curling Championships	Ukraine (men)	31
2021	2021 European Curling Championships	Ukraine (women)	21
