= Alexander Eremin =

Russian curler

- Curler
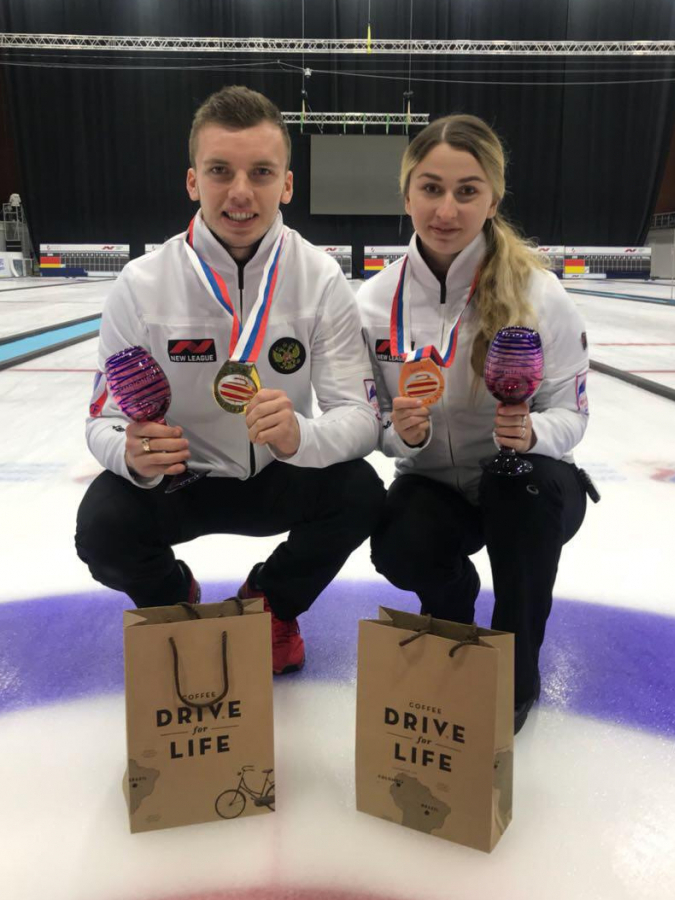
- Born: 16 December 1995 (age 30)

Team
- Skip: Alexander Eremin
- Third: Mikhail Vaskov
- Second: Alexey Tuzov
- Lead: Alexey Kulikov
- Alternate: Kirill Savenkov
- Mixed doubles partner: Anastasia Moskaleva

Curling career
- Member Association: Russia
- World Mixed Doubles Championship: 2 (2019, 2021)
- Other appearances: World Mixed Championship: (2018), World Junior Championships: 1 (2016)
Medal record
Curling
World Mixed Championship
Bronze medal – third place	2018 Kelowna
Russian Men's Championship
Gold medal – first place	2022
Silver medal – second place	2017
Bronze medal – third place	2018
Russian Mixed Championship
Silver medal – second place	2018 Novosibirsk
Silver medal – second place	2020 Dmitrov
Russian Mixed Doubles Championship
Gold medal – first place	2018 Sochi
Gold medal – first place	2019 Sochi
Gold medal – first place	2020 Krasnoyarsk
Bronze medal – third place	2015 Sochi

Alexander Andreevich Eremin (Russian: Алекса́ндр Андре́евич Ерёмин; born 16 December 1995) is a Russian male curler.

== Teams and events ==
=== Men's ===
Season	Skip	Third	Second	Lead	Alternate	Coach	Events
2013–14	Vasily Telezhkin	Alexander Eremin	Dmitry Antipov	Alexey Tuzov	Alexander Chistov		RMCCup 2013 (4th)
2015–16	Sergei Andrianov (fourth)	Alexandr Kuzmin	Timur Gadzhikhanov	Alexander Eremin (skip)			
2015–16	Timur Gadzhikhanov (fourth)	Daniil Goriachev	Dmitry Solomatin	Alexander Eremin (skip)	Lev Puzakov	Alexey Tselousov	WJCC 2016 (7th)
2016–17	Alexander Eremin	Mikhail Vaskov	Alexey Tuzov	Alexey Kulikov	Kirill Savenkov		RMCCup 2016 (silver)
2016–17	Mikhail Vaskov (fourth)	Alexander Eremin (skip)	Alexey Tuzov	Alexey Kulikov	Petr Kuznetsov		RMCCh 2017 (silver)
2016–17	Alexander Eremin	Alexey Tuzov	Ivan Alexandrov	Alexander Bistrov	Nikita Ivanchatenko	Michail Bruskov	WJBCC 2017 (10th)
2017–18	Alexander Eremin	Alexey Kulikov	Alexey Tuzov	Mikhail Vaskov	Petr Kuznetsov		RMCCh 2018 (bronze)
2018–19	Alexander Eremin	Mikhail Vaskov	Alexey Tuzov	Alexey Kulikov	Kirill Savenkov		
2019–20	Alexander Eremin	Mikhail Vaskov	Alexey Tuzov	Alexey Kulikov	Kirill Savenkov		
2020–21	Alexander Eremin	Mikhail Vaskov	Alexey Tuzov	Alexey Kulikov	Kirill Savenkov	Anna Gretskaya; Dmitry Stepanov	RMCCup 2020 (gold); RMCCh 2020 (5th)

=== Mixed ===
Season	Skip	Third	Second	Lead	Alternate	Coach	Events
2011–12	Vasily Telezhkin	Daria Morozova	Pavel Mishin	Olga Kotelnikova	Alexander Eremin		RMxCCh 2012 (11th)
2012–13	Pavel Mishin (fourth)	Daria Styoksova	Alexander Eremin (skip)	Marina Vdovina	Tatiana Lukina, Alexey Tuzov		RMxCCh 2013 (7th)
2014–15	Alexander Eremin	Daria Styoksova	Alexey Tuzov	Olga Kotelnikova			RMxCCup 2014 (13th)
2015–16	Alexander Eremin	?	?	?			RMxCCh 2016 (13th)
2016–17	Alexander Eremin	Daria Morozova	Alexey Tuzov	Olga Kotelnikova			RMxCCh 2017 (5th)
2017–18	Alexander Eremin	Daria Morozova	Alexey Tuzov	Irina Riazanova			RMxCCh 2018 (silver)
2018–19	Alexander Eremin	Maria Komarova	Daniil Goriachev	Anastasia Moskaleva		Vasily Gudin	WMxCC 2018 (bronze)
2020–21	Alexander Eremin	Anastasia Moskaleva	Alexey Tuzov	Daria Morozova			RMxCCh 2020 (silver)

=== Mixed doubles ===
Season	Male	Female	Coach	Events
2011–12	Alexander Eremin	Elena Ushakova		RMDCCh 2012 (19th)
2012–13	Alexander Eremin	Daria Morozova		RMDCCup 2012 (gold); RMDCCh 2013 (9th)
2013–14	Alexander Eremin	Daria Morozova		RMDCCup 2013 (5th); RMDCCh 2014 (11th)
2014–15	Alexander Eremin	Daria Morozova		RMDCCh 2015 (bronze)
2015–16	Alexander Eremin	Anastasia Moskaleva		RMDCCup 2015 (6th)
2016–17	Alexander Eremin	Daria Styoksova		RMDCCup 2016 (9th)
2016–17	Alexander Eremin	Daria Morozova		RMDCCh 2017 (5th)
2017–18	Alexander Eremin	Anastasia Moskaleva		RMDCCh 2018 (gold)
2018–19	Alexander Eremin	Anastasia Moskaleva	Vasily Gudin (RMDCCh, CWC, WMDCC), Vasily Sobakin (WMDCC)	CWC/2 (7th); RMDCCh 2019 (gold); WMDCC 2019 (5th)
2019–20	Alexander Eremin	Anastasia Moskaleva		RMDCCh 2020 (gold)
2020–21	Alexander Eremin	Anastasia Moskaleva	Vasily Gudin; Dan Rafael	RMDCCh 2021 (silver); WMDCC 2021 (11th)
