= Alexey Kulikov =

Russian curler (born 1994)

- Curler
- Born: 11 February 1994 (age 32)

Team
- Skip: Alexander Eremin
- Third: Mikhail Vaskov
- Second: Alexey Tuzov
- Lead: Alexey Kulikov
- Alternate: Kirill Savenkov

Curling career
- Member Association: Russia
- European Championship: 1 (2018)

Alexey Sergeevich Kulikov (Russian: Алексе́й Серге́евич Кулико́в; born 11 February 1994) is a Russian curler. He currently plays lead for the Russian national men's curling team on 2018 European Curling Championships.

== Awards ==
- Master of Sports of Russia (curling, 2015).
- Russian Men's Curling Championship: silver (2017), bronze (2018).
- Russian Men's Curling Cup: silver (2016).
- Russian Mixed Curling Championship: bronze (2014).
- Russian Mixed Doubles Curling Cup: silver (2015)

== Teams and events ==
=== Men's ===
Season	Skip	Third	Second	Lead	Alternate	Coach	Events
2010–11	Mikhail Vaskov	Alexandr Korshunov	Alexey Kulikov	Dmitry Antipov	Pavel Mishin		RMCCup 2010 (13th)
2011–12	Mikhail Vaskov	Alexey Kulikov	Alexandr Korshunov	Pavel Mishin	Kirill Savenkov		RMCCh 2012 (10th)
2012–13	Mikhail Vaskov	Alexey Kulikov	Alexandr Korshunov	Pavel Mishin			RMCCh 2013 (12th)
2013–14	Mikhail Vaskov	Alexandr Korshunov	Alexey Kulikov	Pavel Mishin			RMCCup 2013 (5th)
2014–15	Alexander Kirikov	Vadim Shkolnikov	Alexandr Kuzmin	Alexey Kulikov			
2016–17	Alexander Eremin	Mikhail Vaskov	Alexey Tuzov	Alexey Kulikov	Kirill Savenkov		RMCCup 2016 (silver)
2016–17	Alexey Kulikov (fourth)	Alexey Tuzov	Alexander Eremin (skip)	Mikhail Vaskov	Petr Kuznetsov		RMCCh 2017 (silver)
2017–18	Mikhail Vaskov	Alexey Tuzov	Petr Kuznetsov	Alexey Kulikov			RMCCup 2017 (5th)
2017–18	Alexander Eremin	Alexey Kulikov	Alexey Tuzov	Mikhail Vaskov	Petr Kuznetsov		RMCCh 2018 (bronze)
2018–19	Mikhail Vaskov	Alexey Tuzov	Petr Kuznetsov	Alexey Kulikov	Anton Kalalb (ECC)	Aleksandr Kozyrev	ECC 2018 (7th); RMCCh 2019 (5th)
2019–20	Mikhail Vaskov	Alexey Kulikov	Petr Kuznetsov	Kirill Savenkov			RMCCup 2019 (10th)
2020–21	Alexander Eremin	Mikhail Vaskov	Alexey Tuzov	Alexey Kulikov	Kirill Savenkov	Anna Gretskaya; Dmitry Stepanov	RMCCup 2020 (gold)

=== Mixed ===
Season	Skip	Third	Second	Lead	Alternate	Events
2009–10	Marina Kalinina	Mikhail Vaskov	Daria Morozova	Alexandr Korshunov	Elena Ushakova, Alexey Kulikov	RMxCCh 2010 (9th)
2010–11	Mikhail Vaskov	Anastasia Moskaleva	Alexandr Korshunov	Marina Verenich	Alexey Kulikov	RMxCCh 2011 (7th)
2012–13	Vasily Telezhkin	Daria Morozova	Alexey Kulikov	Anna Gretskaya		RMxCCh 2013 (4th)
2013–14	Vasily Telezhkin	Daria Morozova	Alexey Kulikov	Marina Vdovina	Alexey Tuzov	RMxCCh 2014 (bronze)
2014–15	Vasily Telezhkin	Daria Morozova	Alexey Kulikov	Marina Vdovina		RMxCCup 2014 (7th)
2016–17	Mikhail Vaskov	Anastasia Moskaleva	Alexey Kulikov	Daria Styoksova		RMxCCh 2017 (7th)
2017–18	Anastasia Moskaleva	Mikhail Vaskov	Olga Kotelnikova	Alexey Kulikov		RMxCCh 2018 (9th)

=== Mixed doubles ===
Season	Male	Female	Events
2011–12	Alexey Kulikov	Marina Vdovina	RMDCCup 2011 (14th); RMDCCh 2012 (19th)
2012–13	Alexey Kulikov	Olga Kotelnikova	RMDCCh 2013 (13th)
2013–14	Alexey Kulikov	Olga Kotelnikova	RMDCCh 2014 (9th)
2015–16	Alexey Kulikov	Olga Kotelnikova	RMDCCup 2015 (silver)
2015–16	Alexey Kulikov	Vlada Rumiantseva	RMDCCh 2016 (9th)
2016–17	Alexey Kulikov	Vlada Rumiantseva	RMDCCup 2016 (4th); RMDCCh 2017 (13th)
2017–18	Alexey Kulikov	Olga Kotelnikova	RMDCCh 2018 (17th)
2018–19	Alexey Kulikov	Olga Kotelnikova	RMDCCh 2019 (4th)
