= Roman Kutuzov (curler) =

Russian curler

Roman Alexandrovich Kutuzov Рома́н Алекса́ндрович Куту́зов
- Curler ♂
- Born: 23 July 1986 (age 40); Moscow, Russia

Team
- Curling club: Adamant CC, Saint Petersburg; Krasnodar Krai, Sochi

Curling career
- Member Association: Russia
- World Championship: 1 (2016)
- European Championship: 3 (2005, 2007, 2008)
- Other appearances: European Mixed Championship: 3 (2009, 2012, 2013), World Junior Championships: 1 (2003), European Junior Challenge: 2 (2005, 2008)
Medal record
Curling
Russian Men's Championship
Gold medal – first place	2010
Gold medal – first place	2012 Dmitrov & Saint Petersburg
Silver medal – second place	2013 Dmitrov
Silver medal – second place	2014 Sochi
Bronze medal – third place	2008
European Junior Challenge
Bronze medal – third place	2008 Prague

Roman Alexandrovich Kutuzov (Russian: Рома́н Алекса́ндрович Куту́зов; born 23 July 1986 in Moscow) is a Russian curler.

At the national level, he is a two-time Russian men's champion curler (2010, 2011) and a two-time Russian mixed champion (2009, 2012).

== Teams ==
=== Men's ===
Season	Skip	Third	Second	Lead	Alternate	Coach	Events
2002–03	Vadim Stebakov	Ilya Rotchev	Roman Kutuzov	Alexei Botcharov	Stanislav Semenov		WJCC 2003 (10th)
2003–04	Roman Kutuzov	Ilya Rotchev	Anton Bobrov	Aleksandr Kozyrev	Alexei Botcharov		WJBCC 2004 (9th)
2004–05	Roman Kutuzov	Ilya Rotchev	Alexei Botcharov	Petr Dron	Anton Bobrov	Natalia Petrova	EJCC 2005 (6th)
2005–06	Alexander Kirikov	Dmitri Ryjov	Dmitri Abanin	Alexey Kamnev	Roman Kutuzov		ECC 2005 (10th)
2007–08	Alexander Kirikov	Andrey Drozdov	Petr Dron	Alexey Kamnev	Roman Kutuzov		ECC 2007 (14th)
2007–08	Andrey Drozdov	Roman Kutuzov	Alexey Stukalskiy	Valentin Demenkov	Aleksandr Kozyrev		EJCC 2008 (bronze)
2007–08	Andrey Drozdov	Roman Kutuzov	Aleksandr Kozyrev	Vadim Raev	Sergey Manulychev		RMCC 2008 (bronze)
2008–09	Andrey Drozdov	Alexey Stukalskiy	Artem Bolduzev	Alexey Kamnev	Roman Kutuzov		ECC 2008 (15th)
2009–10	Alexander Kirikov	Vadim Shkolnikov	Roman Kutuzov	Aleksandr Kozyrev	Anton Kalalb		RMCC 2010 (gold)
2011–12	Andrey Drozdov	Alexey Stukalskiy	Roman Kutuzov	Aleksandr Kozyrev			RMCC 2012 (gold)
2012–13	Andrey Drozdov	Alexey Stukalskiy	Roman Kutuzov	Aleksandr Kozyrev			RMCC 2013 (silver)
2013–14	Andrey Drozdov	Alexey Stukalskiy	Anton Kalalb	Aleksandr Kozyrev	Roman Kutuzov		RMCC 2014 (silver)
2014–15	Roman Kutuzov	Aleksandr Kozyrev	Sergey Glukhov	Dmitry Mironov			
2015–16	Alexey Tselousov	Artem Shmakov	Roman Kutuzov	Alexey Timofeev	Aleksandr Kozyrev	Sören Gran	WCC 2016 (10th)

=== Mixed ===
Season	Skip	Third	Second	Lead	Alternate	Events
2007–08	Andrey Drozdov	Anna Sidorova	Roman Kutuzov	Galina Arsenkina	Victoria Makarshina	RMxCC 2008 (bronze)
2008–09	Alexander Kirikov	Margarita Fomina	Roman Kutuzov	Ekaterina Galkina		RMxCC 2009 (gold)
2009–10	Yana Nekrasova	Roman Kutuzov	Daria Kozlova	Aleksandr Kozyrev	Victor Kornev, Alexandra Raeva	EMxCC 2009 (6th)
2009–10	Roman Kutuzov	Ekaterina Galkina	Aleksandr Kozyrev	Ekaterina Antonova		RMxCC 2010 (10th)
2010–11	Roman Kutuzov	Ekaterina Galkina	Vadim Raev	Alina Biktimirova		RMxCC 2011 (???th)
2011–12	Roman Kutuzov	Nkeirouka Ezekh	Vadim Raev	Ekaterina Galkina	Sergey Manulychev, Tatiana Makeeva	RMxCC 2012 (gold)
2012–13	Roman Kutuzov	?	?	?		RMxCCup 2012 (13th)
2012–13	Roman Kutuzov	Evgeniya Demkina	Sergey Manulychev	Ekaterina Kuzmina	Vadim Raev, Valeriya Shelkova	EMxCC 2012 (14th)
2012–13	Roman Kutuzov	Alexandra Saitova	Vadim Raev	Valeriya Shelkova		RMxCC 2013 (silver)
2013–14	Roman Kutuzov	Valeriya Shelkova	Vadim Raev	Maria Duyunova		EMxCC 2013 (21st)
2013–14	Roman Kutuzov	Alexandra Saitova	Vadim Raev	Valeriya Shelkova		RMxCC 2014 (7th)
2014–15	Roman Kutuzov	Olga Jarkova	Sergey Glukhov	Elena Zhutchkova		RMxCC 2015 (5th)
2015–16	Olga Jarkova	Roman Kutuzov	Galina Arsenkina	Aleksandr Kozyrev		RMxCC 2016 (silver)

=== Mixed doubles ===
Season	Male	Female	Events
2006–07	Roman Kutuzov	Ekaterina Antonova	RMDCC 2007 (bronze)
2011–12	Roman Kutuzov	Alexandra Saitova	RMDCCup 2011 (silver)
2011–12	Nadezhda Lepezina	Roman Kutuzov	RMDCC 2012 (6th)
2012–13	Roman Kutuzov	Evgeniya Demkina	RMDCCup 2012 (9th)
2012–13	Roman Kutuzov	Nadezhda Lepezina	RMDCC 2013 (bronze)
2015–16	Roman Kutuzov	Natalia Zaitseva	RMDCCup 2015 (9th)
2017–18	Roman Kutuzov	Victoria Makarshina	RMDCC 2018 (5th)
