= 2020 Russian Mixed Doubles Curling Championship =

- Host city: Krasnoyarsk
- Arena: Crystal Ice Arena
- Dates: February 24 – March 1, 2020
- Winner: Moscow Oblast 1 (Anastasia Moskaleva / Alexander Eremin)
- Finalist: Saint Petersburg 3 (Alina Kovaleva / Alexey Timofeev)

The 2020 Russian Mixed Doubles Curling Championship (Russian: Чемпионат России по кёрлингу среди смешанных пар 2020) was held in Krasnoyarsk at the Crystal Ice Arena from February 24 to March 1, 2020.

The championship was won (third time in a row) by team "Moscow Oblast 1" (Anastasia Moskaleva / Alexander Eremin), who beat team "Saint Petersburg 3" (Alina Kovaleva / Alexey Timofeev) in the final. The Bronze medal was won by team "Moscow Oblast 2" (Daria Styoksova / Mikhail Vaskov).

== Division A ==
=== Teams ===
| | Team | Locale | Woman | Man |
|---|---|---|---|---|
Group A
| A1 | Krasnodar Krai 1 | Sochi | Liudmila Privivkova | Artur Ali |
| A2 | Chelyabinsk Oblast 1 | Chelyabinsk | Anastasia Vdovina | Dmitry Solomatin |
| A3 | Moscow Oblast 1 | Dmitrov | Anastasia Moskaleva | Alexander Eremin |
| A4 | Yenisei | Krasnoyarsk | Anna Venevtseva | Vasily Groshev |
| A5 | Moscow Oblast 3 | Dmitrov | Alexandra Kardapoltseva | Alexey Tuzov |
| A6 | Krasnodar Krai 2 | Sochi | Maria Ignatenko | Arseniy Meshkovich |
| A7 | Saint Petersburg 3 | Saint Petersburg | Alina Kovaleva | Alexey Timofeev |
Group B
| B1 | Team Moscow | Moscow | Ekaterina Telnova | Artyom Puzanov |
| B2 | Saint Petersburg 4 | Saint Petersburg | Alexandra Antonova | Sergei Morozov |
| B3 | Komsomoll 1 | Irkutsk | Nina Polikarpova | Andrei Dudov |
| B4 | Saint Petersburg 1 | Saint Petersburg | Anastasia Khalanskaya | Petr Dron |
| B5 | Moscow Oblast 5 | Dmitrov | Daria Panchenko | Kirill Savenkov |
| B6 | Moscow Oblast 2 | Dmitrov | Daria Styoksova | Mikhail Vaskov |
| B7 | Moscow Oblast 4 | Dmitrov | Ekaterina Tolstova | Kirill Surovov |

=== Round robin ===
Key
| Teams to Playoffs |

Group A

| | Team | A1 | A2 | A3 | A4 | A5 | A6 | A7 | Wins | Losses | DSC, cm | Place |
|---|---|---|---|---|---|---|---|---|---|---|---|---|
| A1 | Krasnodar Krai 1 (Privivkova / Ali) | * | 7:6 | 2:9 | 9:4 | 5:10 | 6:7 | 9:4 | 3 | 3 | 50,38 | 5 |
| A2 | Chelyabinsk Oblast 1 (Vdovina / Solomatin) | 6:7 | * | 10:4 | 5:3 | 7:8 | 3:9 | 3:7 | 2 | 4 | 95,39 | 6 |
| A3 | Moscow Oblast 1 (Moskaleva / Eremin) | 9:2 | 4:10 | * | 9:2 | 10:6 | 9:3 | 8:5 | 5 | 1 | 25,83 | 1 |
| A4 | Yenisei (Venevtseva / Groshev) | 4:9 | 3:5 | 2:9 | * | 1:10 | 5:6 | 4:9 | 0 | 6 | 94,43 | 7 |
| A5 | Moscow Oblast 3 (Kardapoltseva / Tuzov) | 10:5 | 8:7 | 6:10 | 10:1 | * | 10:6 | 5:6 | 4 | 2 | 40,27 | 3 |
| A6 | Krasnodar Krai 2 (Ignatenko / Meshkovich) | 7:6 | 9:3 | 3:9 | 6:5 | 6:10 | * | 2:6 | 3 | 3 | 71,14 | 4 |
| A7 | Saint Petersburg 3 (Kovaleva / Timofeev) | 4:9 | 7:3 | 5:8 | 9:4 | 6:5 | 6:2 | * | 4 | 2 | 27,67 | 2 |

Group B

| | Team | B1 | B2 | B3 | B4 | B5 | B6 | B7 | Wins | Losses | DSC, cm | Place |
|---|---|---|---|---|---|---|---|---|---|---|---|---|
| B1 | Team Moscow (Telnova / Puzanov) | * | 7:6 | 1:7 | 7:6 | 9:4 | 4:5 | 6:10 | 3 | 3 | 59,76 | 4 |
| B2 | Saint Petersburg 4 (Antonova / Morozov) | 6:7 | * | 2:8 | 8:7 | 8:6 | 3:6 | 7:3 | 3 | 3 | 65,16 | 5 |
| B3 | Komsomoll 1 (Polikarpova / Dudov) | 7:1 | 8:2 | * | 4:9 | 3:6 | 3:6 | 8:5 | 3 | 3 | 44,00 | 3 |
| B4 | Saint Petersburg 1 (Khalanskaya / Dron) | 6:7 | 7:8 | 9:4 | * | 8:2 | 6:5 | 7:2 | 4 | 2 | 59,73 | 2 |
| B5 | Moscow Oblast 5 (Panchenko / Savenkov) | 4:9 | 6:8 | 6:3 | 2:8 | * | 2:6 | 7:6 | 2 | 4 | 60,02 | 6 |
| B6 | Moscow Oblast 2 (Styoksova / Vaskov) | 5:4 | 6:3 | 6:3 | 5:6 | 6:2 | * | 10:8 | 5 | 1 | 34,77 | 1 |
| B7 | Moscow Oblast 4 (Tolstova / Surovov) | 10:6 | 3:7 | 5:8 | 2:7 | 6:7 | 8:10 | * | 1 | 5 | 66,08 | 7 |

=== Playoffs ===
Quarterfinals
A(1) | Moscow Oblast 1 (Moskaleva / Eremin)
B(2) | Saint Petersburg 1 (Khalanskaya / Dron) | 6
A(3) | Moscow Oblast 3 (Kardapoltseva / Tuzov) | 5
B(1) | Moscow Oblast 2 (Styoksova / Vaskov)
A(2) | Saint Petersburg 3 (Kovaleva / Timofeev) | 9
B(3) | Komsomoll 1 (Polikarpova / Dudov) | 8

Semifinals
A(1) | Moscow Oblast 1 (Moskaleva / Eremin) | 8
Saint Petersburg 1 (Khalanskaya / Dron) | 2
B(1) | Moscow Oblast 2 (Styoksova / Vaskov) | 3
Saint Petersburg 3 (Kovaleva / Timofeev) | 7

Gold-medal game
Moscow Oblast 1 (Moskaleva / Eremin) | 7
Saint Petersburg 3 (Kovaleva / Timofeev) | 2
Bronze-medal game
Saint Petersburg 1 (Khalanskaya / Dron) | 4
Moscow Oblast 2 (Styoksova / Vaskov) | 10

All draws times are listed in UTC+07:00.

"PP" - power play

==== Quarterfinals ====
February 28, 19:00

| Sheet D | 1 | 2 | 3 | 4 | 5 | 6 | 7 | 8 | 9 | Final |
| A(2) Saint Petersburg 3 (Kovaleva / Timofeev) | 0 | 2 | 3 | 0 | 1 | 0 | 2 (PP) | 0 | 1 | 9 |
| B(3) Komsomoll 1 (Polikarpova / Dudov) | 2 | 0 | 0 | 2 | 0 | 2 | 0 | 2 (PP) | 0 | 8 |

| Sheet E | 1 | 2 | 3 | 4 | 5 | 6 | 7 | 8 | Final |
| A(3) Moscow Oblast 3 (Kardapoltseva / Tuzov) | 0 | 1 | 0 | 1 | 0 | 0 (PP) | 2 | 1 | 5 |
| B(2) Saint Petersburg 1 (Khalanskaya / Dron) | 2 | 0 | 1 | 0 | 2 | 1 | 0 | 0 (PP) | 6 |

==== Semifinals ====
February 29, 10:00

| Sheet B | 1 | 2 | 3 | 4 | 5 | 6 | 7 | 8 | Final |
| A(1) Moscow Oblast 1 (Moskaleva / Eremin) | 0 | 4 | 1 | 1 | 0 | 2 | X | X | 8 |
| Saint Petersburg 1 (Khalanskaya / Dron) | 1 | 0 | 0 | 0 | 1 (PP) | 0 | X | X | 2 |

| Sheet E | 1 | 2 | 3 | 4 | 5 | 6 | 7 | 8 | Final |
| Saint Petersburg 3 (Kovaleva / Timofeev) | 1 | 0 | 1 | 2 | 0 | 0 | 3 (PP) | X | 7 |
| B(1) Moscow Oblast 2 (Styoksova / Vaskov) | 0 | 1 | 0 | 0 | 1 | 1 | 0 | X (PP) | 3 |

==== Bronze-medal game ====
February 29, 15:00

| Sheet D | 1 | 2 | 3 | 4 | 5 | 6 | 7 | 8 | Final |
| Saint Petersburg 1 (Khalanskaya / Dron) | 0 | 2 | 0 | 0 | 2 | 0 | X | X | 4 |
| Moscow Oblast 2 (Styoksova / Vaskov) | 2 | 0 | 1 | 3 | 0 | 4 | X | X | 10 |

==== Final ====
February 29, 15:00

| Sheet C | 1 | 2 | 3 | 4 | 5 | 6 | 7 | 8 | Final |
| Saint Petersburg 3 (Kovaleva / Timofeev) | 0 | 1 | 0 | 0 | 1 | 0 | 0 | X | 2 |
| Moscow Oblast 1 (Moskaleva / Eremin) | 2 | 0 | 2 | 1 | 0 | 1 | 1 | X | 7 |

== Division B ==
=== Teams ===
| | Team | Locale | Woman | Man |
|---|---|---|---|---|
Group A
| A1 | Novosibirsk Oblast 2 | Novosibirsk | Alyona Ermosh | Alexander Polushvaiko |
| A2 | Moskvich 2 | Moscow | Yuliya Bulgakova | Grigory Lavrov |
| A3 | Saint Petersburg 6 | Saint Petersburg | Maria Duyunova | Yevgeny Tkhabisimov |
| A4 | Krasny Yar | Krasnoyarsk | Kristina Dudko | Vladislav Velichko |
| A5 | Tomsk | Tomsk | Natalia Shestobritova | Oleg Horoshkov |
Group B
| B1 | Saint Petersburg 5 | Saint Petersburg | Margarita Evdokimova | Oleg Krasikov |
| B2 | Moskvich 1 | Moscow | Arina Rusina | Nikita Shehirev |
| B3 | Novosibirsk Oblast 1 | Novosibirsk | Alexandra Stoyarosova | Ivan Kazachkov |
| B4 | SHOR-Krasnoyarsk | Krasnoyarsk | Anastasia Kruglikova | Petr Triandafilidi |
| B5 | Saint Petersburg 4 | Saint Petersburg | Anastasia Kilchevskaya | Nikita Ignatkov |

=== Round robin ===
Key
| Teams to Playoffs |

Group A

| | Team | A1 | A2 | A3 | A4 | A5 | Wins | Losses | DSC, cm | Place |
|---|---|---|---|---|---|---|---|---|---|---|
| A1 | Novosibirsk Oblast 2 (Ermosh / Polushvaiko) | * | 5:7 | L:W | 7:8 | 9:10 | 0 | 4 | 78,47 | 5 |
| A2 | Moskvich 2 (Bulgakova / Lavrov) | 7:5 | * | 6:9 | 4:11 | 11:0 | 2 | 2 | 69,27 | 3 |
| A3 | Saint Petersburg 6 (Duyunova / Tkhabisimov) | W:L | 9:6 | * | 4:6 | 10:9 | 3 | 1 | 144,64 | 2 |
| A4 | Krasny Yar (Dudko / Velichko) | 8:7 | 11:4 | 6:4 | * | 8:4 | 4 | 0 | 73,91 | 1 |
| A5 | Tomsk (Shestobritova / Horoshkov) | 10:9 | 0:11 | 9:10 | 4:8 | * | 1 | 3 | 104,36 | 4 |

Group B

| | Team | B1 | B2 | B3 | B4 | B5 | Wins | Losses | DSC, cm | Place |
|---|---|---|---|---|---|---|---|---|---|---|
| B1 | Saint Petersburg 5 (Evdokimova / Krasikov) | * | 7:5 | 8:5 | 8:7 | 4:9 | 3 | 1 | 45,16 | 2 |
| B2 | Moskvich 1 (Rusina / Shehirev) | 5:7 | * | 2:7 | 7:4 | 9:3 | 2 | 2 | 47,09 | 4 |
| B3 | Novosibirsk Oblast 1 (Stoyarosova / Kazachkov) | 5:8 | 7:2 | * | 6:5 | 6:9 | 2 | 2 | 28,11 | 3 |
| B4 | SHOR-Krasnoyarsk (Kruglikova / Triandafilidi) | 7:8 | 4:7 | 5:6 | * | 3:11 | 0 | 4 | 73,06 | 5 |
| B5 | Saint Petersburg 4 (Kilchevskaya / Ignatkov) | 9:4 | 3:9 | 9:6 | 11:3 | * | 3 | 1 | 89,93 | 1 |

=== Playoffs ===
Quarterfinals
A(1) | Krasny Yar (Dudko / Velichko)
B(2) | Saint Petersburg 5 (Evdokimova / Krasikov) | 11
A(3) | Moskvich 2 (Bulgakova / Lavrov) | 3
B(1) | Saint Petersburg 4 (Kilchevskaya / Ignatkov)
A(2) | Saint Petersburg 6 (Duyunova / Tkhabisimov) | 7
B(3) | Novosibirsk Oblast 1 (Stoyarosova / Kazachkov) | 11

Semifinals
A(1) | Krasny Yar (Dudko / Velichko) | 5
Saint Petersburg 5 (Evdokimova / Krasikov) | 7
B(1) | Saint Petersburg 4 (Kilchevskaya / Ignatkov) | 6
Novosibirsk Oblast 1 (Stoyarosova / Kazachkov) | 3

Gold-medal game
Saint Petersburg 5 (Evdokimova / Krasikov) | 11
Saint Petersburg 4 (Kilchevskaya / Ignatkov) | 6
Bronze-medal game
Krasny Yar (Dudko / Velichko) | 4
Novosibirsk Oblast 1 (Stoyarosova / Kazachkov) | 6

All draws times are listed in UTC+07:00.

"PP" - power play

==== Quarterfinals ====
February 28, 19:00

| Sheet B | 1 | 2 | 3 | 4 | 5 | 6 | 7 | 8 | Final |
| A(3) Moskvich 2 (Bulgakova / Lavrov) | 0 | 0 | 0 | 2 (PP) | 0 | 1 | 0 | X | 3 |
| B(2) Saint Petersburg 5 (Evdokimova / Krasikov) | 3 | 1 | 1 | 0 | 3 | 0 | 3 | X | 11 |

| Sheet C | 1 | 2 | 3 | 4 | 5 | 6 | 7 | 8 | Final |
| B(3) Novosibirsk Oblast 1 (Stoyarosova / Kazachkov) | 3 | 1 | 1 | 0 | 2 | 2 | 0 | 2 (PP) | 11 |
| A(2) Saint Petersburg 6 (Duyunova / Tkhabisimov) | 0 | 0 | 0 | 4 | 0 | 0 (PP) | 3 | 0 | 7 |

==== Semifinals ====
February 29, 10:00

| Sheet C | 1 | 2 | 3 | 4 | 5 | 6 | 7 | 8 | Final |
| A(1) Krasny Yar (Dudko / Velichko) | 0 | 1 | 0 | 1 | 1 | 0 | 2 (PP) | X | 5 |
| Saint Petersburg 5 (Evdokimova / Krasikov) | 2 | 0 | 1 | 0 | 0 | 4 (PP) | 0 | X | 7 |

| Sheet D | 1 | 2 | 3 | 4 | 5 | 6 | 7 | 8 | Final |
| B(1) Saint Petersburg 4 (Kilchevskaya / Ignatkov) | 1 | 0 | 1 | 0 | 3 | 0 | 1 | X | 6 |
| Novosibirsk Oblast 1 (Stoyarosova / Kazachkov) | 0 | 1 | 0 | 1 | 0 | 1 (PP) | 0 | X | 3 |

==== Bronze-medal game ====
February 29, 15:00

| Sheet E | 1 | 2 | 3 | 4 | 5 | 6 | 7 | 8 | Final |
| Novosibirsk Oblast 1 (Stoyarosova / Kazachkov) | 0 | 2 | 0 | 1 | 2 | 1 | 0 | X | 6 |
| Krasny Yar (Dudko / Velichko) | 1 | 0 | 1 | 0 | 0 | 0 | 2 | X | 4 |

==== Final ====
February 29, 15:00

| Sheet B | 1 | 2 | 3 | 4 | 5 | 6 | 7 | 8 | Final |
| Saint Petersburg 5 (Evdokimova / Krasikov) | 3 | 1 | 3 | 0 | 0 | 1 | 3 | X | 11 |
| Saint Petersburg 4 (Kilchevskaya / Ignatkov) | 0 | 0 | 0 | 5 | 1 | 0 | 0 | X | 6 |

== Final standings ==
| Place | Team | Woman | Man | Games | Wins | Losses | DSC, cm |
|---|---|---|---|---|---|---|---|
| 1st place, gold medalist(s) | Moscow Oblast 1 (Dmitrov) | Anastasia Moskaleva | Alexander Eremin | 8 | 7 | 1 | 25,83 |
| 2nd place, silver medalist(s) | Saint Petersburg 3 | Alina Kovaleva | Alexey Timofeev | 9 | 6 | 3 | 27,67 |
| 3rd place, bronze medalist(s) | Moscow Oblast 2 (Dmitrov) | Daria Styoksova | Mikhail Vaskov | 8 | 6 | 2 | 34,77 |
| 4 | Saint Petersburg 1 | Anastasia Khalanskaya | Petr Dron | 9 | 5 | 4 | 59,37 |
| 5 | Moscow Oblast 3 | Alexandra Kardapoltseva | Alexey Tuzov | 7 | 4 | 3 | 40,27 |
| 6 | Komsomoll 1 (Irkutsk) | Nina Polikarpova | Andrei Dudov | 7 | 3 | 4 | 44,00 |
| 7 | Team Moscow | Ekaterina Telnova | Artyom Puzanov | 6 | 3 | 3 | 59,76 |
| 8 | Krasnodar Krai 2 (Sochi) | Maria Ignatenko | Arseniy Meshkovich | 6 | 3 | 3 | 71,14 |
| 9 | Krasnodar Krai 1 (Sochi) | Liudmila Privivkova | Artur Ali | 6 | 3 | 3 | 50,38 |
| 10 | Saint Petersburg 4 | Alexandra Antonova | Sergei Morozov | 6 | 3 | 3 | 65,16 |
| 11 | Moscow Oblast 5 (Dmitrov) | Daria Panchenko | Kirill Savenkov | 6 | 2 | 4 | 60,02 |
| 12 | Chelyabinsk Oblast 1 (Chelyabinsk) | Anastasia Vdovina | Dmitry Solomatin | 6 | 2 | 4 | 95,39 |
| 13 | Moscow Oblast 4 (Dmitrov) | Ekaterina Tolstova | Kirill Surovov | 6 | 1 | 5 | 66,08 |
| 14 | Krasnoyarsk Krai (Krasnoyarsk) | Anna Venevtseva | Vasily Groshev | 6 | 0 | 6 | 94,43 |
| 15 | Saint Petersburg 5 | Margarita Evdokimova | Oleg Krasikov | 7 | 6 | 1 | 45,16 |
| 16 | Saint Petersburg 4 | Anastasia Kilchevskaya | Nikita Ignatkov | 6 | 4 | 2 | 89,93 |
| 17 | Novosibirsk Oblast 1 (Novosibirsk) | Alexandra Stoyarosova | Ivan Kazachkov | 7 | 4 | 3 | 28,11 |
| 18 | Krasny Yar (Krasnoyarsk) | Kristina Dudko | Vladislav Velichko | 4 | 4 | 2 | 73,91 |
| 19 | Moskvich 2 (Moscow) | Yuliya Bulgakova | Grigory Lavrov | 5 | 2 | 3 | 69,27 |
| 20 | Saint Petersburg 6 | Maria Duyunova | Yevgeny Tkhabisimov | 5 | 3 | 2 | 144,64 |
| 21 | Moskvich 1 (Moscow) | Arina Rusina | Nikita Shehirev | 4 | 2 | 2 | 47,09 |
| 22 | Tomsk | Natalia Shestobritova | Oleg Horoshkov | 4 | 1 | 3 | 104,36 |
| 23 | SHOR-Krasnoyarsk | Anastasia Kruglikova | Petr Triandafilidi | 4 | 0 | 4 | 73,06 |
| 24 | Novosibirsk Oblast 2 (Novosibirsk) | Alyona Ermosh | Alexander Polushvaiko | 4 | 0 | 4 | 78,47 |

- next year move to Division B
- next year move to Division A

== See also ==
- 2020 Russian Men's Curling Championship
- 2020 Russian Women's Curling Championship
- 2020 Russian Mixed Curling Championship
- 2020 Russian Junior Curling Championships
- 2020 Russian Wheelchair Curling Championship
