= Maria Duyunova =

Russian curler

- Curler ♀
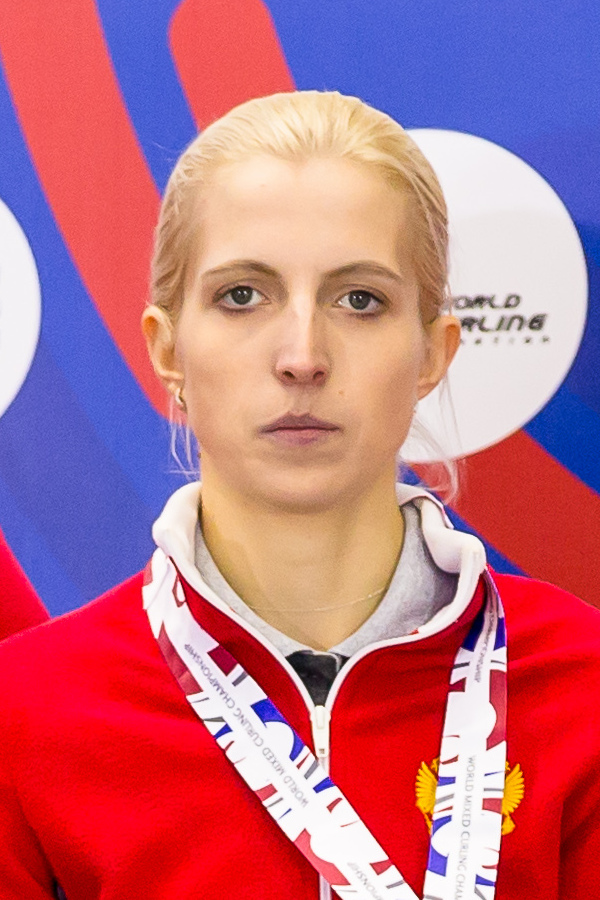
- Born: 30 April 1990 (age 36); Leningrad, RSFSR, USSR

Team
- Curling club: CK Adamant, Saint Petersburg

Curling career
- Member Association: Russia
- Other appearances: World Mixed Championship: 1 (2016), European Mixed Championship: 1 (2013), Winter Universiade: 1 (2017)
Medal record
Curling
World Mixed Championship
Gold medal – first place	2016 Kazan
Winter Universiade
Silver medal – second place	2017 Almaty

Maria Aleksandrovna Duyunova (Russian: Мари́я Алекса́ндровна Дуюно́ва; born 30 April 1990 in Leningrad, RSFSR, USSR) is a Russian female curler.

== Awards ==
- World Mixed Curling Championship: gold (2016).
- Russian Women's Curling Championship: silver (2008, 2009).
- Russian Mixed Curling Championship: gold (2013, 2016, 2017), silver (2015).
- Russian Mixed Curling Cup: gold (2014), bronze (2017).
- International Class Master of Sports of Russia (curling, 2016).

== Teams and events ==
=== Women's ===
Season	Skip	Third	Second	Lead	Alternate	Coach	Events
2007–08	Victoria Moiseeva	Maria Duyunova	Daria Antonova	Alyona Borisova	Svetlana Mitrofanova		RWCCh 2008 (silver)
2008–09	Maria Duyunova	Daria Lipets	Vera Kornilova	Daria Verhovina			RU18CC 2008 (4th)
2008–09	Maria Duyunova	Anna Mylnikova	Elizaveta Solovjeva	Elena Ilinykh			RU21CC 2009 (9th)
2008–09	Maria Duyunova	Anna Mylnikova	Maria Vinogradova	Alyona Borisova			RWCCh 2009 (silver)
2009–10	Victoria Moiseeva	Oksana Gertova	Maria Duyunova	Alyona Borisova			RWCCup 2009 (7th)
2009–10	Victoria Moiseeva	Oksana Gertova	Olesya Glushchenko	Alyona Borisova	Maria Duyunova		RU21CC 2010 (silver)
2009–10	Victoria Moiseeva	Oksana Gertova	Olesya Glushchenko	Maria Duyunova	Alyona Borisova		RWCCh 2010 (5th)
2010–11	Victoria Moiseeva	Oksana Gertova	Olesya Glushchenko	Maria Duyunova	Alyona Borisova		RWCCup 2010 (6th)
2010–11	Victoria Moiseeva	Oksana Gertova	Olesya Glushchenko	Maria Duyunova	Olesya Kolesnikova		RWCCh 2011 (6th)
2011–12	Oksana Gertova	Maria Duyunova	Olesya Glushchenko	Olesya Kolesnikova			
2011–12	Victoria Moiseeva	Maria Duyunova	Oksana Gertova	Olesya Glushchenko	Olesya Kolesnikova		RWCCup 2011 (14th)
2011–12	Victoria Moiseeva	Oksana Gertova	Olesya Glushchenko	Maria Duyunova	Olesya Kolesnikova		RWCCh 2012 (4th)
2013–14	Victoria Moiseeva	Oksana Gertova	Olesya Glushchenko	Olesya Kolesnikova	Maria Duyunova		
2013–14	Oksana Gertova	Olesya Glushchenko	Maria Duyunova	Olesya Kolesnikova			RWCCup 2013 (bronze)
2015–16	Victoria Moiseeva	Yulia Portunova	Julia Guzieva	Anastasia Bryzgalova	Maria Duyunova	Sergei Belanov	
2016–17	Victoria Moiseeva	Maria Duyunova	Oksana Gertova	Arina Zasedateleva	Polina Bikker		RWCCup 2016 (5th)
2016–17	Victoria Moiseeva	Uliana Vasilyeva	Galina Arsenkina	Yulia Portunova	Maria Duyunova	Sergei Belanov	WUG 2017 (silver)
2018–19	Maria Baksheeva	Maria Duyunova	Victoria Dupont	Arina Zasedateleva	Oksana Gertova		RWCCh 2019 (6th)

=== Mixed ===
Season	Skip	Third	Second	Lead	Alternate	Coach	Events
2007–08	Anton Bobrov	Anna Mylnikova	Alexander Boyko	Maria Duyunova			RMxCCh 2008 (9th)
2008–09	Denis Yakovlev	Anna Mylnikova	Aleksandr Orlov	Maria Duyunova		Irina Kolesnikova, Konstantin Zadvornov, M. Cherepanov	RMxCCup 2008 (4th)
2008–09	Ivan Uledev (fourth)	Olga Volohova (skip)	Nikita Pershakov	Maria Duyunova		Irina Kolesnikova, A.V. Kolesnikov	RMxCCh 2009 (13th)
2009–10	Valentin Demenkov	Victoria Moiseeva	Ivan Uledev	Maria Duyunova	Irina Kolesnikova		RMxCCup 2009 (silver)
2009–10	Denis Yakovlev (fourth)	Victoria Moiseeva	Valentin Demenkov (skip)	Maria Duyunova			RMxCCh 2010 (6th, Group В)
2010–11	Victoria Moiseeva	Denis Yakovlev	Maria Duyunova	Ivan Uledev	Nikita Pershakov, Yana Nekrasova		RMxCCup 2010 (4th)
2010–11	Yana Nekrasova	Aleksandr Orlov	Victoria Moiseeva	Alexander Boyko	Maria Duyunova		RMxCCh 2011 (4th)
2011–12	Yana Nekrasova	Aleksandr Orlov	Maria Duyunova	Ivan Uledev	Victoria Moiseeva		RMxCCup 2011 (5th)
2011–12	Yana Nekrasova	Aleksey Kamnev	Victoria Moiseeva	Aleksandr Orlov	Maria Duyunova		RMxCCh 2012 (6th)
2012–13	Anders Kraupp	Victoria Moiseeva	Aleksandr Orlov	Maria Duyunova	Vladislav Goncharenko		RMxCCh 2013 (gold)
2013–14	Roman Kutuzov	Valeriya Shelkova	Vadim Raev	Maria Duyunova		Olga Andrianova	EMxCC 2013 (21st)
2013–14	Alexander Krushelnitskiy	Victoria Moiseeva	Aleksandr Orlov	Maria Duyunova	Ilya Badilin		RMxCCh 2014 (5th)
2014–15	Alexander Krushelnitskiy	Victoria Moiseeva	Ilya Badilin	Maria Duyunova			RMxCCup 2014 (gold)
2014–15	Alexander Krushelnitskiy	Maria Duyunova	Daniil Goriachev	Yana Garshina			RMxCCh 2015 (silver)
2015–16	Alexander Krushelnitskiy	Anastasia Bryzgalova	Daniil Goriachev	Maria Duyunova		Vasily Gudin	RMxCCh 2016 (gold); WMxCC 2016 (gold)
2016–17	Alexander Krushelnitskiy	Anastasia Bryzgalova	Daniil Goriachev	Maria Duyunova			RMxCCh 2017 (gold)
2017–18	Andrey Drozdov	Maria Baksheeva	Aleksandr Orlov	Maria Duyunova			RMxCCup 2017 (bronze)
2017–18	Anastasia Bryzgalova	Daniil Goriachev	Maria Duyunova	Alexandr Bystrov			RMxCCh 2018 (7th)
2018–19	Konstantin Manasevich	Maria Duyunova	Vadim Shvedov	Arina Zasedateleva			RMxCCup 2018 (5th)
2018–19	Sergei Morozov	Maria Duyunova	Konstantin Manasevich	Arina Zasedateleva			RMxCCh 2019 (6th)

=== Mixed doubles ===
Season	Male	Female	Alternate	Events
2008–09	Denis Yakovlev	Maria Duyunova	Valentin Demenkov	RMDCCup 2008 (silver)
2009–10	Ivan Uledev	Maria Duyunova	Petr Dron	RMDCCup 2009 (gold)
2011–12	Ivan Uledev	Maria Duyunova		RMDCCup 2011 (9th); RMDCCh 2012 (19th)
2012–13	Dmitry Startsev	Maria Duyunova		RMDCCup 2012 (15th)
2012–13	Dmitry Startsev	Maria Duyunova		RMDCCh 2013 (20th)
2013–14	Aleksandr Orlov	Maria Duyunova		RMDCCh 2014 (11th)
2014–15	Ivan Uledev	Maria Duyunova		RMDCCh 2015 (5th)
2018–19	Sergei Morozov	Maria Duyunova		RMDCCh 2019 (15th)
2019–20	Yevgeny Tkhabisimov	Maria Duyunova		RMDCCh 2020 (20th)
