= Alexey Kamnev =

Russian curler

- Curler
- Born: 16 August 1979 (age 47); Leningrad, RSFSR, USSR

Team
- Curling club: CK Adamant, Saint Petersburg

Curling career
- Member Association: Russia
- World Mixed Doubles Championship: 1 (2013)
- European Championship: 4 (2005, 2006, 2007, 2008)
- Other appearances: European Mixed Championship: 2 (2005, 2007)
Medal record
Russian Men's Championship
Gold medal – first place	2005 Moscow
Gold medal – first place	2006 Moscow
Gold medal – first place	2008 Moscow
Gold medal – first place	2011 Moscow
Silver medal – second place	2012 Dmitrov / Saint Petersburg
Russian Mixed Championship
Gold medal – first place	2008 Moscow
Silver medal – second place	2011 Dmitrov
Russian Mixed Doubles Championship
Gold medal – first place	2013 Dmitrov
Bronze medal – third place	2012 Dmitrov

Alexey Nikolayevich Kamnev (Russian: Алексе́й Никола́евич Ка́мнев; born 16 August 1979 in Leningrad, RSFSR, USSR) is a Russian curler.

At the national level he is a four-time Russian men's champion curler (2005, 2006, 2008, 2011), 2013 Russian mixed doubles champion curler and 2008 Russian mixed champion curler.

== Awards ==
- Russian Men's Curling Championship: gold (2005, 2006, 2008, 2011), silver (2012).
- Russian Mixed Curling Championship: gold (2008), silver (2011).
- Russian Mixed Doubles Curling Championship: gold (2013), bronze (2012).
- Master of Sports of Russia, International Class (curling).

== Teams ==
=== Men's ===
Season	Skip	Third	Second	Lead	Alternate	Coach	Events
2004–05	Alexander Kirikov	Vladimir Shkolnikov	Alexey Kamnev	Dmitry Abanin	Anton Kalalb, Andrey Drozdov		RMCCh 2005 (gold)
2005–06	Alexander Kirikov	Dmitri Ryjov	Dmitry Abanin	Alexey Kamnev	Roman Kutuzov	Yory Andrianov, Olga Andrianova	ECC 2005 (9th)
2005–06	Alexander Kirikov	Vladimir Shkolnikov	Alexey Kamnev	Dmitry Abanin			RMCCh 2006 (gold)
2006–07	Alexander Kirikov	Petr Dron	Vadim Shkolnikov	Dmitry Abanin	Alexey Kamnev		ECC 2006 (13th)
2006–07	Alexander Kirikov	Andrey Drozdov	Roman Kutuzov	Dmitry Abanin	Alexey Kamnev		
2007–08	Alexander Kirikov	Andrey Drozdov	Petr Dron	Alexey Kamnev	Roman Kutuzov	Yory Andrianov	ECC 2007 (14th)
2007–08	Alexander Kirikov	Andrey Drozdov	Roman Kutuzov	Dmitry Abanin	Alexey Kamnev		
2007–08	Alexander Kirikov	Vladimir Shkolnikov	Alexey Kamnev	Dmitry Abanin			RMCCh 2008 (gold)
2008–09	Andrey Drozdov	Alexey Stukalskiy	Artem Bolduzev	Alexey Kamnev	Roman Kutuzov	Yory Andrianov	ECC 2008 (15th)
2010–11	Alexey Tselousov	Artur Razhabov	Alexey Kamnev	Petr Dron			
2010–11	Alexey Tselousov	Petr Dron	Alexey Kamnev	Artur Razhabov	Alexander Badilin		RMCCh 2011 (gold)
2011–12	Alexey Tselousov	Andrey Drozdov	Alexey Stukalskiy	Alexey Kamnev			
2011–12	Alexey Tselousov	Petr Dron	Alexey Kamnev	Artur Razhabov	Alexander Badilin		RMCCh 2012 (silver)

=== Mixed ===
Season	Skip	Third	Second	Lead	Alternate	Events
2005–06	Alexander Kirikov	Margarita Fomina	Dmitry Abanin	Angela Tuvaeva	Alexey Kamnev, Ilona Grishina	EMxCC 2005 (6th)
2007–08	Alexander Kirikov	Daria Kozlova	Alexey Kamnev	Julia Svetova	Vadim Shkolnikov, Ekaterina Antonova	EMxCC 2007 (5th)
2007–08	Alexander Kirikov	Daria Kozlova	Alexey Kamnev	Julia Svetova	Denis Kilba, Alexandra Saitova	RMxCCh 2008 (gold)
2009–10	Alexey Tselousov	Alina Kovaleva	Alexey Kamnev	Julia Zadorozhnaya		RMxCCh 2010 (6th)
2010–11	Alexey Tselousov	Alina Kovaleva	Alexey Kamnev	Julia Zadorozhnaya		RMxCCh 2011 (silver)
2011–12	Yana Nekrasova	Alexey Kamnev	Victoria Moiseeva	Aleksandr Orlov	Maria Duyunova	RMxCCh 2012 (6th)
2014–15	Alexey Kamnev	?	?	?		RMxCCh 2015 (15th)

=== Mixed doubles ===
Season	Male	Female	Coach	Events
2010–11	Alexey Kamnev	Yana Nekrasova		RMDCCup 2010 (5th)
2011–12	Alexey Kamnev	Yana Nekrasova		RMDCCh 2012 (bronze)
2012–13	Alexey Kamnev	Yana Nekrasova	Irina Kolesnikova (WMDCC)	RMDCCup 2012 (15th); RMDCCh 2013 (gold); WMDCC 2013 (9th)
2013–14	Alexey Kamnev	Yana Nekrasova		RMDCCup 2013 (silver)
2014–15	Alexey Kamnev	Yana Nekrasova		RMDCCh 2015 (9th)
2015–16	Alexey Kamnev	Yana Nekrasova		RMDCCup 2015 (15th); RMDCCh 2016 (5th)
