= 2019 Russian Mixed Doubles Curling Championship =

- Host city: Sochi
- Arena: Ice Cube Curling Center
- Dates: January 24–27, 2019
- Winner: Moscow Oblast 1 (Anastasia Moskaleva / Alexander Eremin)
- Finalist: Saint Petersburg 2 (Anastasia Khalanskaya / Petr Dron)

The 2019 Russian Mixed Doubles Curling Championship (Russian: Чемпионат России по кёрлингу среди смешанных пар 2019) was held in Sochi from January 24 to 27, 2019.

First 14 teams (3 top teams from each group and 2 from additional qualification round for 4th-placed teams) qualified to next year championship. Champions team represented Russia on 2019 World Mixed Doubles Curling Championship.

== Teams ==
	Team	Locale	Woman	Man
Group A
A1	Moskvich 3	Moscow	Ekaterina Telnova	Artyom Puzanov
A2	Krasnodar Krai 2	Sochi	Natalya Nalimova	Dmitry Mironov
A3	Chelyabinsk Oblast 1	Chelyabinsk	Anastasia Kilchevskaya	Dmitry Solomatin
A4	Saint Petersburg 3	Saint Petersburg	Diana Margaryan	Aleksandr Bystrov
A5	Moscow Oblast 5	Dmitrov	Ekaterina Tolstova	Kirill Surovov
A6	Moscow Oblast 1	Dmitrov	Anastasia Moskaleva	Alexander Eremin
Group B
B1	Tatarstan	Kazan	Yana Averyanova	Maxim Ivanov
B2	Moscow Oblast 4	Dmitrov	Olga Kotelnikova	Alexey Kulikov
B3	Moskvich 1	Moscow	Daria Tskhvedanashvili	Timofei Nasonov
B4	Saint Petersburg 1	Saint Petersburg	Maria Komarova	Daniil Goriachev
B5	Komsomoll 1	Irkutsk	Elizaveta Trukhina	Andrei Dudov
B6	Krasnodar Krai 3	Sochi	Anastasia Eskusian	Aleksandr Polushvaiko
Group C
C1	Krasnodar Krai 4	Sochi	Sophia Tkach	Arsenyj Meshkovich
C2	Udmurt Republic	Izhevsk	Xenia Kamasheva	Dmitry Vinogradov
C3	Moskvich 4	Moscow	Xenia Strelkova	Artyom Bukarev
C4	Team Moscow	Moscow	Alina Biktimirova	Timur Gadzhikhanov
C5	Saint Petersburg 2	Saint Petersburg	Anastasia Khalanskaya	Petr Dron
C6	Moscow Oblast 3	Dmitrov	Daria Morozova	Alexey Tuzov
Group D
D1	Novosibirsk Oblast	Novosibirsk	Ekaterina Kungurova	Nikita Kukunin
D2	Moskvich 2	Moscow	Arina Rusina	Nikita Shekhirev
D3	Saint Petersburg 4	Saint Petersburg	Maria Duyunova	Sergei Morozov
D4	Moscow Oblast 2	Dmitrov	Daria Styoksova	Mikhail Vaskov
D5	Krasnoyarsk Krai	Krasnoyarsk	Anna Venevtseva	Vasily Groshev
D6	Krasnodar Krai 1	Sochi	Maria Ignatenko	Sergey Glukhov

== Round Robin ==
Key
Teams to Playoffs

Group A

Place	Team	A-1	A-2	A-3	A-4	A-5	A-6	Wins	Losses	DSC, cm
A-1	Chelyabinsk Oblast 1 (Kilchevskaya / Solomatin)	*	9:7	7:6	8:7	5:11	9:6	4	1	46,27
A-2	Moscow Oblast 1 (Moskaleva / Eremin)	7:9	*	10:2	9:2	9:3	6:4	4	1	34,23
A-3	Saint Petersburg 3 (Margaryan / Bystrov)	6:7	2:10	*	9:4	10:6	6:4	3	2	49,11
A-4	Moscow Oblast 5 (Tolstova / Surovov)	7:8	2:9	4:9	*	10:9	8:2	2	3	66,40
A-5	Krasnodar Krai 2 (Nalimova / Mironov)	11:5	3:9	6:10	9:10	*	8:2	2	3	37,06
A-6	Moskvich 3 (Telnova / Puzanov)	6:9	4:6	4:6	2:8	2:8	*	0	5	49,73

Group B

Place	Team	B-1	B-2	B-3	B-4	B-5	B-6	Wins	Losses	DSC, cm
B-1	Saint Petersburg 1 (Komarova / Goriachev)	*	8:2	8:1	8:6	8:2	14:4	5	0	67,41
B-2	Moscow Oblast 4 (Kotelnikova / Kulikov)	2:8	*	7:4	9:1	7:6	11:3	4	1	52,47
B-3	Komsomoll 1 (Trukhina / Dudov)	1:8	4:7	*	9:3	8:4	12:1	3	2	38,89
B-4	Krasnodar Krai 3 (Eskusian / Polushvaiko)	6:8	1:9	3:9	*	6:5	11:5	2	3	68,80
B-5	Moskvich 1 (Tskhvedanashvili / Nasonov)	2:8	6:7	4:8	5:6	*	8:3	1	4	68,46
B-6	Tatarstan (Averyanova / Ivanov)	4:14	3:11	1:12	5:11	3:8	*	0	5	148,13

Group C

Place	Team	C-1	C-2	C-3	C-4	C-5	C-6	Wins	Losses	DSC, cm
C-1	Saint Petersburg 2 (Khalanskaya / Dron)	*	13:3	10:7	7:4	5:6	11:0	4	1	45,33
C-2	Moscow Oblast 3 (Morozova / Tuzov)	3:13	*	8:5	8:2	7:6	11:4	4	1	40,49
C-3	Team Moscow (Biktimirova / Gadzhikhanov)	7:10	5:8	*	8:4	9:5	11:2	3	2	41,60
C-4	Krasnodar Krai 4 (Tkach / Meshkovich)	4:7	2:8	4:8	*	7:6	9:5	2	3	60,13
C-5	Moskvich 4 (Strelkova / Bukarev)	6:5	6:7	5:9	6:7	*	11:2	2	3	75,94
C-6	Udmurt Republic (Kamasheva / Vinogradov)	0:11	4:11	2:11	5:9	2:11	*	0	5	91,33

Group D

Place	Team	D-1	D-2	D-3	D-4	D-5	D-6	Wins	Losses	DSC, cm
D-1	Moscow Oblast 2 (Styoksova / Vaskov)	*	7:5	7:5	6:2	8:6	7:6	5	0	50,06
D-2	Krasnoyarsk Krai (Venevtseva / Groshev)	5:7	*	9:5	8:6	6:8	8:6	3	2	78,41
D-3	Krasnodar Krai 1 (Ignatenko / Glukhov)	5:7	5:9	*	8:7	8:9	10:6	2	3	32,06
D-4	Saint Petersburg 4 (Duyunova / Morozov)	2:6	6:8	7:8	*	11:5	7:5	2	3	68,62
D-5	Moskvich 2 (Rusina / Shekhirev)	6:8	8:6	9:8	5:11	*	5:7	2	3	77,92
D-6	Novosibirsk Oblast (Kungurova / Kukunin)	6:7	6:8	6:10	5:7	7:5	*	1	4	100,74

== Qualification games for 13th and 14th places ==
Semifinals
С-4	Krasnodar Krai 4 (Tkach / Meshkovich)	11
B-4	Krasnodar Krai 3 (Eskusian / Polushvaiko)	6
A-4	Moscow Oblast 5 (Tolstova / Surovov)	9
D-4	Saint Petersburg 4 (Duyunova / Morozov)	6

Qualified for championship-2020
13	Krasnodar Krai 4 (Tkach / Meshkovich)
14	Moscow Oblast 5 (Tolstova / Surovov)

== Playoffs ==
Quarterfinals
A-1	Chelyabinsk Oblast 1 (Kilchevskaya / Solomatin)	4
B-2	Moscow Oblast 4 (Kotelnikova / Kulikov)	9
C-1	Saint Petersburg 2 (Khalanskaya / Dron)	7
D-2	Krasnoyarsk Krai (Venevtseva / Groshev)	5
D-1	Moscow Oblast 2 (Styoksova / Vaskov)	4
C-2	Moscow Oblast 3 (Morozova / Tuzov)	10
B-1	Saint Petersburg 1 (Komarova / Goriachev)	4
A-2	Moscow Oblast 1 (Moskaleva / Eremin)	7

Semifinals
Moscow Oblast 4 (Kotelnikova / Kulikov)	3
Saint Petersburg 2 (Khalanskaya / Dron)	8
Moscow Oblast 3 (Morozova / Tuzov)	3
Moscow Oblast 1 (Moskaleva / Eremin)	9

Gold Medal Game
Saint Petersburg 2 (Khalanskaya / Dron)	3
Moscow Oblast 1 (Moskaleva / Eremin)	8
Bronze Medal Game
Moscow Oblast 4 (Kotelnikova / Kulikov)	6
Moscow Oblast 3 (Morozova / Tuzov)	11

== Final standings ==
Place	Team	Woman	Man	Games	Wins	Losses	DSC, cm
1st place, gold medalist(s)	Moscow Oblast 1 (Dmitrov)	Anastasia Moskaleva	Alexander Eremin	8	7	1	34,23
2nd place, silver medalist(s)	Saint Petersburg 2	Anastasia Khalanskaya	Petr Dron	8	6	2	45,33
3rd place, bronze medalist(s)	Moscow Oblast 3 (Dmitrov)	Daria Morozova	Alexey Tuzov	8	6	2	40,49
4	Moscow Oblast 4 (Dmitrov)	Olga Kotelnikova	Alexey Kulikov	8	5	3	52,47
5	Chelyabinsk Oblast 1 (Chelyabinsk)	Anastasia Kilchevskaya	Dmitry Solomatin	6	4	2	46,27
6	Moscow Oblast 2 (Dmitrov)	Daria Styoksova	Mikhail Vaskov	6	5	1	50,06
7	Saint Petersburg 1	Maria Komarova	Daniil Goriachev	6	5	1	67,41
8	Krasnoyarsk Krai (Krasnoyarsk)	Anna Venevtseva	Vasily Groshev	6	3	3	78,41
9	Krasnodar Krai 1 (Sochi)	Maria Ignatenko	Sergey Glukhov	5	2	3	32,06
10	Komsomoll 1 (Irkutsk)	Elizaveta Trukhina	Andrei Dudov	5	3	2	38,89
11	Team Moscow	Alina Biktimirova	Timur Gadzhikhanov	5	3	2	41,60
12	Saint Petersburg 3	Diana Margaryan	Aleksandr Bystrov	5	3	2	49,11
13	Krasnodar Krai 4 (Sochi)	Sophia Tkach	Arsenyj Meshkovich	6	3	3	60,13
14	Moscow Oblast 5 (Dmitrov)	Ekaterina Tolstova	Kirill Surovov	6	3	3	66,40
15	Saint Petersburg 4	Maria Duyunova	Sergei Morozov	6	2	4	68,62
16	Krasnodar Krai 3 (Sochi)	Anastasia Eskusian	Aleksandr Polushvaiko	6	2	4	68,80
17	Krasnodar Krai 2 (Sochi)	Natalya Nalimova	Dmitry Mironov	5	2	3	37,06
18	Moskvich 1 (Moscow)	Daria Tskhvedanashvili	Timofei Nasonov	5	1	4	68,46
19	Moskvich 4 (Moscow)	Xenia Strelkova	Artyom Bukarev	5	2	3	75,94
20	Moskvich 2 (Moscow)	Arina Rusina	Nikita Shekhirev	5	2	3	77,92
21	Moskvich 3 (Moscow)	Ekaterina Telnova	Artyom Puzanov	5	0	5	49,73
22	Udmurt Republic (Izhevsk)	Xenia Kamasheva	Dmitry Vinogradov	5	0	5	91,33
23	Novosibirsk Oblast (Novosibirsk)	Ekaterina Kungurova	Nikita Kukunin	5	1	4	100,74
24	Tatarstan (Kazan)	Yana Averyanova	Maxim Ivanov	5	0	5	148,13

== See also ==
- 2019 Russian Men's Curling Championship
- 2019 Russian Women's Curling Championship
- 2019 Russian Mixed Curling Championship
- 2019 Russian Junior Curling Championships
- 2019 Russian Wheelchair Curling Championship
