= Timur Gadzhikhanov =

Russian curler

- Curler
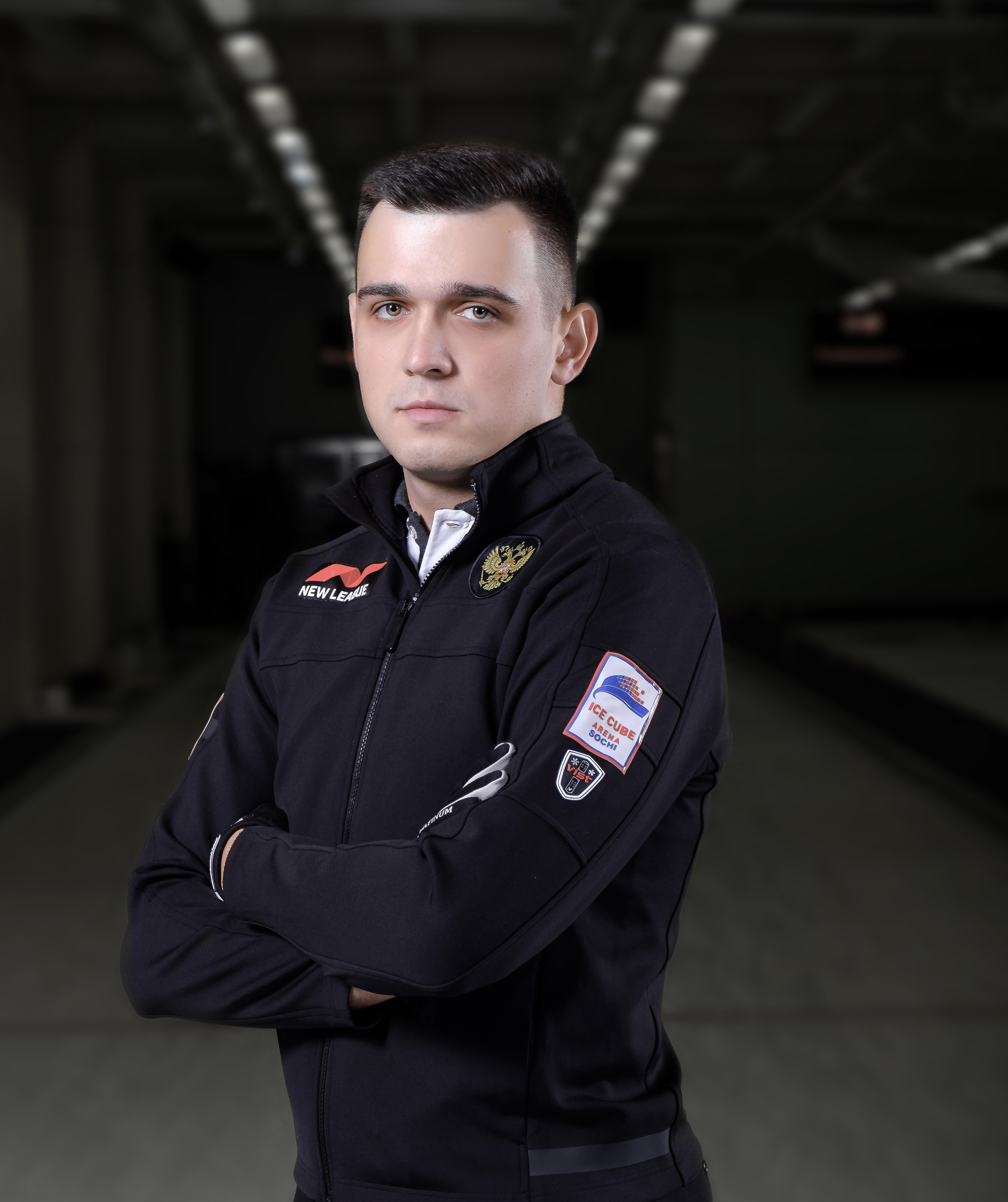
- Gadzhikhanov in 2018
- Born: 5 June 1995 (age 31); Kazan, Russia

Team
- Curling club: SDUSShOR Moskvich CC, Moscow
- Skip: Alexey Timofeev
- Third: Alexey Stukalskiy
- Second: Timur Gadzhikanov
- Lead: Artur Razhabov
- Alternate: Evgeny Klimov
- Coach: Vasily Gudin

Curling career
- World Championship: 1 (2017)
- European Championship: 1 (2016)
Medal record
Men's curling
Representing Russia
World Junior Curling Championships
Silver medal – second place	2013 Sochi
European Junior Curling Challenge
Gold medal – first place	2015 Prague
Silver medal – second place	2012 Copenhagen

Timur Magomedovich Gadzhikhanov (Russian: Тиму́р Магоме́дович Гаджиха́нов; born 5 June 1995 in Kazan, Russia) is a Russian curler from Moscow.

He played second for the Russian national men's curling team at the 2016 European Curling Championships.

== Awards ==
- World Junior Curling Championships: Silver (2013).
- European Junior Curling Challenge: Gold (2015), Silver (2012).
- Russian Men's Junior Championship (U-18): Gold (2011/12), Bronze (2008/09, 2009/10).
- Russian Men's Junior Championship (U-21): Gold (2010/11, 2011/12), Silver (2012/13, 2013/14).
- Russian Mixed Doubles Curling Cup: Silver (2016).
- Russian Men's Curling Championship: Gold (2014), Silver (2015).
- Russian Men's Curling Cup: Gold (2013, 2014).
- Russian Men's SuperCup: Gold (2016).
- Russian Mixed Curling Championship: Gold (2014).
- Master of Sports of Russia.

== Teammates ==
2016 European Curling Championships

- Alexey Timofeev, Fourth, Skip
- Alexey Stukalskiy, Third
- Artur Ali, Lead
- Artur Razhabov, Alternate
