= Russian Mixed Doubles Curling Championship =

- Established: 2007
- 2026 host city: Sochi
- 2026 arena: Iceberg Skating Palace
- 2026 champion: Novosibirsk Oblast 1 (Novosibirsk Oblast); Alexandra Stoyarosova / Ivan Kazachkov

The Russian Mixed Doubles Curling Championship (Russian: Чемпионат России по кёрлингу среди смешанных пар, Первенство России по кёрлингу среди смешанных пар, Чемпионат России по кёрлингу в дисциплине дабл-микст) are the annual national curling championships for mixed doubles curling in Russia. As of 2024, the event consisted of thirty-two teams participating in a preliminary round robin and a single-knockout playoff.

== Past champions ==
Year	Host	Winning Team	Runner-up Team	Bronze Team
2007	Moscow	ESVSM Moskvich 1 (Moscow); Olga Zharkova / Dmitry Abanin, alternate: Anna Sidorova	SKA 2 (Saint Petersburg); Olga Voronova / Ivan Uledev, alternates: Anastasia Raskhoroshina, Sergey Evert	ESVSM Moskvich 2 (Moscow); Ekaterina Antonova / Roman Kutuzov
2011		no data (or no MD championship in 2008-2011?)		
2012	Dmitrov	Moskvich 1 (Moscow); Victoria Makarshina / Andrey Drozdov	Saint Petersburg 2 (Saint Petersburg); Uliana Vasilyeva / Petr Dron	Saint Petersburg 3 (Saint Petersburg); Yana Nekrasova / Alexey Kamnev
2013	Dmitrov	Saint Petersburg 1 (Saint Petersburg); Yana Nekrasova / Alexey Kamnev	Moscow 2 (Moscow); Ekaterina Antonova / Alexey Stukalskiy	Moscow 3 (Moscow); Nadezhda Lepezina / Roman Kutuzov
2014	Dmitrov	Saint Petersburg 1 (Saint Petersburg); Victoria Moiseeva / Alexander Krushelnitskiy	Moscovskaya Oblast 2 (Dmitrov); Daria Styoksova / Dmitry Antipov	Saint Petersburg 2 (Saint Petersburg); Oksana Gertova / Ilya Badilin
2015	Sochi	Krasnodarskiy Krai (Sochi); Sergey Glukhov / Elena Zhuchkova	Saint Petersburg 3 (Saint Petersburg); Alina Kovaleva / Viktor Vorobyov	Moscovskaya Oblast 2 (Dmitrov); Daria Morozova / Alexander Eremin
2016	Sochi	Saint Petersburg 1 (Saint Petersburg); Anastasia Bryzgalova / Alexander Krushelnitskiy	Moscovskaya Oblast 1 (Dmitrov); Daria Morozova / Dmitry Antipov	Saint Petersburg 4 (Saint Petersburg); Maria Rustamova / Ivan Aleksandrov
2017	Sochi	Adamant Saint Petersburg 1 (Saint Petersburg); Anastasia Bryzgalova / Alexander Krushelnitskiy	Saint Petersburg 3 (Saint Petersburg); Veronica Teplyashina / Andrey Drozdov	Saint Petersburg 2 (Saint Petersburg); Maria Komarova / Daniil Goriachev
2018	Sochi	Moscovskaya Oblast 1 (Dmitrov); Anastasia Moskaleva / Alexander Eremin	Zekurion-Moskvich (Moscow); Alina Biktimirova / Timur Gadzhikhanov	Moscovskaya Oblast 2 (Dmitrov); Daria Styoksova / Mikhail Vaskov
2019	Sochi	Moscovskaya Oblast 1 (Dmitrov); Anastasia Moskaleva / Alexander Eremin	Saint Petersburg 2 (Saint Petersburg); Anastasia Khalanskaya / Petr Dron	Moscovskaya Oblast 3 (Dmitrov); Daria Morozova / Alexey Tuzov
2020	Krasnoyarsk	Moscovskaya Oblast 1 (Dmitrov); Anastasia Moskaleva / Alexander Eremin	Saint Petersburg 3 (Saint Petersburg); Alina Kovaleva / Alexey Timofeev	Moscovskaya Oblast 1 (Dmitrov); Daria Styoksova / Mikhail Vaskov
2021	Sochi	Saint Petersburg 3 (Saint Petersburg); Nkeirouka Ezekh / Oleg Krasikov	Moscovskaya Oblast 1 (Dmitrov); Anastasia Moskaleva / Alexander Eremin	Irkutskaya Oblast-Komsomoll 1 (Irkutsk); Elizaveta Trukhina / Nikolay Lysakov
2022	Sochi	Moscovskaya Oblast 1 (Dmitrov); Anastasia Moskaleva / Alexander Eremin	Irkutskaya Oblast-Komsomoll (Irkutsk); Elizaveta Trukhina / Mikhail Vlasenko	Moscovskaya Oblast 2 (Dmitrov); Daria Morozova / Mikhail Vaskov
2023	Sochi	Saint Petersburg 2 (Saint Petersburg); Nkeirouka Ezekh / Oleg Krasikov	Saint Petersburg 1 (Saint Petersburg); Alina Kovaleva / Alexey Timofeev	Irkutskaya Oblast-Komsomoll 1 (Irkutsk); Elizaveta Trukhina / Nikolay Lysakov
2024	Sochi	Irkutskaya Oblast-Komsomoll 3 (Irkutsk); Elizaveta Trukhina / Nikolay Lysakov	Saint Petersburg 2 (Saint Petersburg); Alina Kovaleva / Alexey Timofeev	Krasnodar Krai 1 (Sochi); Viktoria Enbaeva / Dmitry Mironov
2025	Sochi	Saint Petersburg 2 (Saint Petersburg); Anastasia Bryzgalova / Alexander Krushelnitskiy	Irkutskaya Oblast-Komsomoll 1 (Irkutsk); Elizaveta Trukhina / Nikolay Lysakov	Saint Petersburg 3 (Saint Petersburg); Nkeirouka Ezekh / Oleg Krasikov
2026	Sochi	Novosibirsk Oblast 1 (Novosibirsk Oblast); Alexandra Stoyarosova / Ivan Kazachkov	Saint Petersburg 2 (Saint Petersburg); Nkeirouka Ezekh / Oleg Krasikov	Moscovskaya Oblast 3 (Dmitrov); Anastasia Moskaleva / Kirill Surovov

== All time medals ==
One common table for men and women players. As of the conclusion of the 2024 Russian Mixed Doubles Curling Championship (without results of 2011 Championship, because it can't be found yet).

Curler	M/F	Gold	Silver	Bronze	Total
Alexander Eremin	M	4	1	1	6
Anastasia Moskaleva	F	4	1	1	6
Alexander Krushelnitskiy	M	4	0	0	4
Anastasia Bryzgalova	F	3	0	0	3
Nkeirouka Ezekh	F	2	1	1	4
Oleg Krasikov	M	2	1	1	4
Elizaveta Trukhina	F	1	2	2	5
Nikolay Lysakov	M	1	1	2	4
Andrey Drozdov	M	1	1	0	2
Alexey Kamnev	M	1	0	1	2
Yana Nekrasova	F	1	0	1	2
Dmitry Abanin	M	1	0	0	1
Sergey Glukhov	M	1	0	0	1
Ivan Kazachkov	M	1	0	0	1
Victoria Makarshina	F	1	0	0	1
Victoria Moiseeva	F	1	0	0	1
Anna Sidorova	F	1	0	0	1
Alexandra Stoyarosova	F	1	0	0	1
Olga Zharkova	F	1	0	0	1
Elena Zhuchkova	F	1	0	0	1
Alina Kovaleva	F	0	4	0	4
Alexey Timofeev	M	0	3	0	3
Dmitry Antipov	M	0	2	0	2
Petr Dron	M	0	2	0	2
Daria Morozova	F	0	1	3	4
Daria Styoksova	F	0	1	2	3
Ekaterina Antonova	F	0	1	1	2
Alina Biktimirova	F	0	1	0	1
Sergey Evert	M	0	1	0	1
Timur Gadzhikhanov	M	0	1	0	1
Anastasia Khalanskaya	F	0	1	0	1
Anastasia Raskhoroshina	F	0	1	0	1
Alexey Stukalskiy	M	0	1	0	1
Veronica Teplyashina	F	0	1	0	1
Ivan Uledev	M	0	1	0	1
Uliana Vasilyeva	F	0	1	0	1
Mikhail Vlasenko	M	0	1	0	1
Viktor Vorobyov	M	0	1	0	1
Olga Voronova	F	0	1	0	1
Mikhail Vaskov	M	0	0	3	3
Roman Kutuzov	M	0	0	2	2
Ivan Aleksandrov	M	0	0	1	1
Ilya Badilin	M	0	0	1	1
Viktoria Enbaeva	F	0	0	1	1
Oksana Gertova	F	0	0	1	1
Daniil Goriachev	M	0	0	1	1
Maria Komarova	F	0	0	1	1
Nadezhda Lepezina	F	0	0	1	1
Dmitry Mironov	M	0	0	1	1
Maria Rustamova	F	0	0	1	1
Kirill Surovov	M	0	0	1	1
Alexey Tuzov	M	0	0	1	1

== See also ==
- Russian Curling Championships
- Russian Mixed Doubles Curling Cup
- Russian Wheelchair Curling Championship
- Russian Wheelchair Mixed Doubles Curling Championship
