= Artur Ali =

Russian curler

- Curler
- Born: 1 January 1994 (age 32); Moscow, Russia

Team
- Curling club: Moskvich CC, Moscow
- Skip: Sergey Glukhov
- Third: Dmitry Mironov
- Second: Artur Ali
- Lead: Aleksandr Kozyrev

Curling career
- Member Association: Russia
- World Championship: 1 (2019)
- European Championship: 1 (2016)
Medal record
Men's Curling
Representing Russia
World Junior Curling Championships
Silver medal – second place	2013 Sochi
European Junior Curling Challenge
Gold medal – first place	2015 Prague
Silver medal – second place	2012 Copenhagen

Arthur Faridovich Ali (Russian: Арту́р Фари́дович Али́; born 1 January 1994 in Moscow, Russia) is a Russian curler.

He played lead for the Russian national men's curling team at the 2016 European Curling Championships.

== Awards ==
- World Junior Curling Championships: Silver (2013).
- European Junior Curling Challenge: Gold (2015), Silver (2012).
- Master of Sports of Russia.

== Teammates ==
2016 European Curling Championships

- Alexey Timofeev, Fourth, Skip
- Alexey Stukalskiy, Third
- Timur Gadzhikhanov, Second
- Artur Razhabov, Alternate
