= Evgeny Klimov (curler) =

Russian curler from Saint Petersburg (born 1993)

- Curler
- Born: 22 November 1993 (age 32); Slantsy, Leningrad Oblast, Russia

Team
- Curling club: CC Adamant, St. Petersburg
- Skip: Sergey Glukhov
- Third: Evgeny Klimov
- Second: Dmitry Mironov
- Lead: Anton Kalalb
- Alternate: Daniil Goriachev

Curling career
- Member Association: Russia
- World Championship: 4 (2017, 2018, 2019, 2021)
- European Championship: 2 (2017, 2021)
- Olympic: 1 (2022)
- Other appearances: World Mixed Curling Championship: 1 (2015); Winter Universiade: 1 (2017)

Evgeny Alexandrovich Klimov (Russian: Евге́ний Алекса́ндрович Кли́мов; born 22 November 1993) is a Russian curler from Saint Petersburg. He played alternate for the Russian national men's curling team at the 2017 Winter Universiade.

== Awards ==
- Russian Men's Curling Championship: Gold (2014, 2019), Silver (2015, 2016).
- Russian Men's Curling Cup: Silver (2013, 2014, 2020).
- Russian Mixed Curling Championship: Gold (2015, 2020).
- Master of Sports of Russia (2014)
- Master of Sports of Russia, International Class (2016)

== Personal life ==
Klimov was a student of the Lesgaft National State University of Physical Education, Sport and Health (Saint Petersburg). He is married.

== Teammates ==
2017 Winter Universiade

- Alexey Timofeev, Fourth, Skip
- Timur Gadzhikhanov, Third
- Artur Razhabov, Second
- Artur Ali, Lead
