= Alexey Timofeev =

Russian curler

- Curler
- Born: 22 February 1991 (age 35); Slantsy, Russian SFSR, Soviet Union

Team
- Curling club: CC Adamant, St. Petersburg
- Skip: Alexey Timofeev
- Third: Daniil Goriachev
- Second: Evgeny Klimov
- Lead: Artur Razhabov
- Alternate: Aleksandr Bystrov

Curling career
- Member Association: Russia
- World Championship: 3 (2016, 2017, 2018)
- European Championship: 3 (2016, 2017, 2019)

Alexey Vyacheslavovich Timofeev (Russian: Алексе́й Вячесла́вович Тимофе́ев; born 22 February 1991 in Slantsy, Soviet Union) is a Russian curler from Saint Petersburg.

He skipped the Russian national men's curling team at the 2016 and 2017 European Curling Championships. He has also played in three World Curling Championships in 2016, 2017 and 2018, skippering the team to an 8th place finish at the 2018 World Men's Curling Championship.

On the World Curling Tour, Timofeev won his first event at the 2018 KW Fall Classic.

== Awards ==
- Russian Men's Curling Championship: Gold (2014, 2019), Silver (2015).
- Russian Men's Curling Cup: Gold (2013, 2014, 2016), Silver (2020).
- Russian Mixed Curling Championship: Gold (2014, 2020).
- Russian Mixed Doubles Curling Championship: Silver (2020).
- Master of Sports of Russia.

== Personal life ==
He is a student at the St. Petersburg Specialized School of Olympic Reserve, No. 2 (technical school).

== Teammates ==
2016 European Curling Championships

- Alexey Stukalskiy, Third
- Timur Gadzhikhanov, Second
- Artur Ali, Lead
- Artur Razhabov, Alternate
