= Alexey Tselousov =

Russian curler

- Curler
- Born: 23 December 1975 (age 50); Leningrad

Team
- Curling club: Adamant CC, Saint Petersburg, Russia
- Skip: Alexey Tselousov
- Third: Artem Shmakov
- Second: Roman Kutuzov
- Lead: Aleksei Timofeev
- Alternate: Alexander Kozyrev

Curling career
- World Championship: 2 (2013, 2016)
- World Mixed Doubles Championship: 1 (2011)
- European Championship: 9 (1995, 1997, 1998, 1999, 2000, 2002, 2004, 2011, 2012)
Medal record
World Mixed Doubles Curling Championship
| Silver medal – second place | 2011 St. Paul |
Russian Men's Curling Cup
| Gold medal – first place | 1999 |
| Gold medal – first place | 2000 |
| Gold medal – first place | 2002 |
| Gold medal – first place | 2012 |
| Gold medal – first place | 2014 |

Alexey Tselousov (Russian: Алексе́й Целоу́сов, Алексе́й Васи́льевич Целоу́сов born 23 December 1975) is a Russian curler from Saint Petersburg.

Tselousov has played in eight European Curling Championships (1995, 1997, 1998, 1999, 2000, 2002, 2004, 2011), skipping all but two (1995 and 2004) when he played second for the Russian team. While playing on the Russian team, his best performance was 2004 when he played second for Alexander Kirikov. The rink finished in 8th place.

Tselousov's only international medal came at the 2011 World Mixed Doubles Curling Championship, where he and partner Alina Kovaleva won the silver medal after losing to Switzerland 11–2 in the final.

Tselousov won his first World Curling Tour event in 2011 when he won the 2011 Cloverdale Cash Spiel.

At the 2016 World Men's Curling Championship, the Alexey Stukalskiy rink was slated to represent Russia, however, was replaced last-minute with Tselousov's rink after the Stukalskiy rink could not participate due to illness. This was Tselousov's second appearance at the World Curling Championships.
