= Alexey Stukalskiy =

Russian curler

- Curler
- Born: 8 July 1988 (age 38); Moscow, Russia

Team
- Curling club: Moskvitch CC, Moscow
- Skip: Alexey Timofeev
- Third: Alexey Stukalskiy
- Second: Artur Razhabov
- Lead: Evgeny Klimov
- Mixed doubles partner: Nkeirouka Ezekh

Curling career
- Member Association: Russia
- World Championship: 4 (2013, 2014, 2015, 2017)
- European Championship: 9 (2008, 2009, 2010, 2011, 2012, 2013, 2014, 2015, 2016)
- Olympic: 1 (2014)
Medal record
Curling
Representing Russia
Winter Universiade
Silver medal – second place	2015 Granada

Alexey Vitalyevich Stukalskiy (Russian: Алексей Витальевич Стукальский; born 8 July 1988) is a Russian curler. He plays fourth stones for Andrey Drozdov on the Russian national team.

== Career ==
Stukalskiy began curling at the age of 15. He played in his first World Curling Championships for Russia under skip Andrey Drozdov at the 2013 Ford World Men's Curling Championship, finishing in tenth place. Stukalskiy was named to the Russian team at the 2014 Winter Olympics, and the team finished in seventh place with a 3–6 win–loss record.
