= Artur Razhabov =

Russian curler

- Curler
- Born: 28 April 1989 (age 37); Saint Petersburg

Team
- Curling club: Adamant CC, Saint Petersburg, RUS
- Skip: Alexey Timofeev
- Third: Daniil Goriachev
- Second: Evgeny Klimov
- Lead: Artur Razhabov
- Alternate: Aleksandr Bystrov

Curling career
- Member Association: Russia
- World Championship: 3 (2015, 2017, 2018)
- European Championship: 6 (2011, 2014, 2015, 2016, 2017, 2019)
Medal record
Men's curling
Representing Russia
Winter Universiade
| Silver medal – second place | 2015 Granada |

Artur Dovlatzhonovich Razhabov (Russian: Артур Довлатжонович Ражабов; born 28 April 1989) is a Russian curler from Saint Petersburg. He currently plays second for the Russian national curling team.

Razhabov was a member of the Russian team at the 2011 and 2014 European Curling Championships. He played lead for Alexey Tselousov at the 2011 European Curling Championships, finishing 11th place. At the 2014 European Curling Championships, he played second for Evgeny Arkhipov, finishing sixth. The placement qualified the team to represent Russia at the 2015 Ford World Men's Curling Championship, Razhabov's first.

Also in 2015, Razhabov was a member of the Russian team (skipped by Arkhipov) that won a silver medal at the 2015 Winter Universiade.
