= 2021–22 curling season =

- Sport: Curling

Seasons
- ← 2020–21 2022–23 →

The 2021–22 curling season began in June 2021 and ended in May 2022.

Note: In events with two genders, the men's tournament winners will be listed before the women's tournament winners.

== World Curling Federation events ==
=== Championships ===
Event			Gold	Silver	Bronze
European Curling Championships; Geneva, Switzerland, Sep. 12–17	C	M	Slovenia (Čulić)	Belgium (Verreycken)	Slovakia (Pitoňák)
European Curling Championships; Geneva, Switzerland, Sep. 12–17	C	W	Lithuania (Paulauskaitė)	Slovenia (Zavrtanik Drglin)	Austria (Augustin)
World Mixed Curling Championship; Aberdeen, Scotland, Oct.			Cancelled		
World Wheelchair Curling Championship; Beijing, China, Oct. 23–30			China (Wang)	Sweden (Petersson-Dahl)	RCF (Kurokhtin)
Americas Zone Challenge; Lacombe, Alberta, Canada, Oct. 29–31			Canada (Bottcher)	Brazil (Mello)	Mexico (Barajas)
Pacific-Asia Curling Championships; Almaty, Kazakhstan, Nov. 7–13		M	South Korea (Kim)	Japan (Morozumi)	Chinese Taipei (Lin)
Pacific-Asia Curling Championships; Almaty, Kazakhstan, Nov. 7–13		W	Japan (Yoshimura)	South Korea (Kim)	Kazakhstan (Ebauyer)
European Curling Championships; Lillehammer, Norway, Nov. 20–27	A	M	Scotland (Mouat)	Sweden (Edin)	Italy (Retornaz)
European Curling Championships; Lillehammer, Norway, Nov. 20–27	A	W	Scotland (Muirhead)	Sweden (Hasselborg)	Germany (Jentsch)
European Curling Championships; Lillehammer, Norway, Nov. 20–27	B	M	Turkey (Karagöz)	Russia (Glukhov)	Spain (Vez)
European Curling Championships; Lillehammer, Norway, Nov. 20–27	B	W	Norway (Rørvik)	Latvia (Barone)	Hungary (Szentannai)
Winter Universiade; Lucerne, Switzerland, Dec. 6–14			Cancelled		
World Junior-B Curling Championships; Lohja, Finland, Jan. 3–14		M	Play halted after 10 draws		
World Junior-B Curling Championships; Lohja, Finland, Jan. 3–14		W	Cancelled		
2022 Winter Olympics; Beijing, China, Feb. 2–20		M	Sweden (Edin)	Great Britain (Mouat)	Canada (Gushue)
2022 Winter Olympics; Beijing, China, Feb. 2–20		W	Great Britain (Muirhead)	Japan (Fujisawa)	Sweden (Hasselborg)
2022 Winter Olympics; Beijing, China, Feb. 2–20		MD	Italy (Constantini / Mosaner)	Norway (Skaslien / Nedregotten)	Sweden (de Val / Eriksson)
Winter Paralympics; Beijing, China, Mar. 5–12			China (Wang)	Sweden (Petersson-Dahl)	Canada (Ideson)
World Women's Curling Championship; Prince George, British Columbia, Canada, Mar. 19–27			Switzerland (Tirinzoni)	South Korea (Kim)	Canada (Einarson)
World Men's Curling Championship; Las Vegas, Nevada, United States, Apr. 2–10			Sweden (Edin)	Canada (Gushue)	Italy (Retornaz)
World Senior Curling Championships; Geneva, Switzerland, Apr. 23–30		M	Canada (White)	Czech Republic (Šik)	Sweden (Wranå)
World Senior Curling Championships; Geneva, Switzerland, Apr. 23–30		W	Switzerland (Lestander)	United States (Smith)	Scotland (Hazard)
World Mixed Doubles Curling Championship; Geneva, Switzerland, Apr. 23–30			Scotland (Muirhead / Lammie)	Switzerland (Pätz / Michel)	Germany (Schöll / Harsch)
European Curling Championships; Kaunas, Lithuania, Apr. 30 – May 5	C	M	Ireland (Wilson)	Ukraine (Nikolov)	Portugal (Seixeiro)
European Curling Championships; Kaunas, Lithuania, Apr. 30 – May 5	C	W	Belgium (Van Oosterwyck)	Spain (Valles Rodriguez)	Finland (Ahrenberg)
World Wheelchair Mixed Doubles Curling Championship; Lohja, Finland, Apr. 30 – May 5			Sweden (Johansson / Holm)	Hungary (Sárai / Beke)	Norway (Iversen / Lorentsen)
World Junior Curling Championships; Jönköping, Sweden, May 15–22		M	Scotland (Craik)	Germany (Kapp)	Canada (Purcell)
World Junior Curling Championships; Jönköping, Sweden, May 15–22		W	Japan (Yamamoto)	Sweden (Dryburgh)	United States (Strouse)

=== Qualification events ===
Event		Qualifiers
Pre-Olympic Qualification Event; Erzurum, Turkey, Oct. 5–15	M	Czech Republic; Finland
Pre-Olympic Qualification Event; Erzurum, Turkey, Oct. 5–15	W	Latvia; Turkey
Pre-Olympic Qualification Event; Erzurum, Turkey, Oct. 5–15	MD	Denmark; Latvia; Turkey
Olympic Qualification Event; Leeuwarden, Netherlands, Dec. 5–18	M	Norway; Italy; Denmark
Olympic Qualification Event; Leeuwarden, Netherlands, Dec. 5–18	W	Great Britain; Japan; South Korea
Olympic Qualification Event; Leeuwarden, Netherlands, Dec. 5–18	MD	Australia; United States
World Mixed Doubles Qualification Event; Forfar, Scotland, Jan. 4-9		Cancelled
World Qualification Event; Lohja, Finland, Jan. 18–22	M	Russia; Netherlands
World Qualification Event; Lohja, Finland, Jan. 18–22	W	Denmark; Norway

== Other events ==
Event	Winner	Runner-up
United States Mixed Doubles Olympic Trials Qualifier 1 Denver, Colorado, Aug. 19–22	(Wisconsin) B. Hamilton / M. Hamilton	(Minnesota) Sinclair / Ruohonen
Russian Mixed Doubles Cup; Irkutsk, Russia, Aug. 27–30	Ezekh / Stukalskiy	Babarykina / Manasevich
United States Olympic Trials Qualifier – Seattle; Seattle, Washington, Sep. 3–6	(Minnesota) Rich Ruohonen	(Pennsylvania) Scott Dunnam
United States Olympic Trials Qualifier – Seattle; Seattle, Washington, Sep. 3–6	(Minnesota) Madison Bear	(North Dakota) Christine McMakin (Minnesota) Delaney Strouse
Japanese Olympic Curling Trials; Wakkanai, Japan, Sep. 10–12	Satsuki Fujisawa	Sayaka Yoshimura
United States Mixed Doubles Olympic Trials Qualifier 2 Blaine, Minnesota, Sep. 17–20	(Minnesota) Sinclair / Ruohonen	(Massachusetts) Walker / Leichter
Japanese Mixed Doubles Olympic Trials; Wakkanai, Japan, Sep. 18–20	Matsumura / Tanida	Yoshida / Matsumura
Russian Mixed Doubles Olympic Trials – Leg 1 Sochi, Russia, Sep. 21–25	(Moscow) Sidorova / Timofeev	(Moscow) Moskaleva / Eremin
Swiss Olympic Curling Trials; Biel, Switzerland, Sep. 22–25	(Canton of Geneva) Peter de Cruz	(Canton of Bern) Yannick Schwaller
Chairman's Cup; Uiseong, South Korea, Sep. 25–27	Lee Jae-beom	Park Jong-duk
Chairman's Cup; Uiseong, South Korea, Sep. 25–27	Gim Un-chi	Kim Hye-rin
United States Olympic Trials Qualifier – Mayfield; Cleveland, Ohio, Sep. 30 – Oct. 3	(Alaska) Greg Persinger	(Pennsylvania) Scott Dunnam
United States Olympic Trials Qualifier – Mayfield; Cleveland, Ohio, Sep. 30 – Oct. 3	(Minnesota) Delaney Strouse	(North Dakota) Christine McMakin
Russian Mixed Doubles Olympic Trials – Leg 2 Kislovodsk, Russia, Oct. 16–20	(Moscow) Sidorova / Timofeev	(Moscow) Moskaleva / Eremin
German Mixed Doubles Olympic Trials; Füssen, Germany, Oct. 23–25	Schöll / Harsch	Kapp / Muskatewitz
United States Mixed Doubles Olympic Trials; Eveleth, Minnesota, Oct. 26–31	(Alaska) Persinger / (Minnesota) Plys	(Minnesota) Sinclair / Ruohonen
Canadian Deaf Curling Championship; Morris, Manitoba, Nov. 10–14	(Manitoba) Ross LaVallee	(Manitoba) Joseph Comte
Canadian Deaf Curling Championship; Morris, Manitoba, Nov. 10–14	(Alberta) Korol / Austria	(Nova Scotia) Logan / Chung
Norway Cup; Trondheim, Norway, Nov. 12–14	Magnus Nedregotten	Lukas Høstmælingen
Norway Cup; Trondheim, Norway, Nov. 12–14	(Elite Group); Steffen Walstad	(Elite Group); Magnus Ramsfjell
United States Olympic Trials; Omaha, Nebraska, Nov. 12–21	(Minnesota) John Shuster	(Minnesota) Korey Dropkin
United States Olympic Trials; Omaha, Nebraska, Nov. 12–21	(Minnesota) Tabitha Peterson	(Minnesota) Cory Christensen
Japanese World Championship Trials; Tokoro, Japan, Dec. 10–12	Takumi Maeda	Yusuke Morozumi
Japanese World Championship Trials; Tokoro, Japan, Dec. 10–12	Seina Nakajima	Sayaka Yoshimura
Swedish Eliteserien; Sundbyberg, Sweden, Feb. 18–20	Isabella Wranå	Tova Sundberg
Cal State Games; Vernon, California, Mar. 4–6	(California) Justin McBride	(California) Ahmet Uysal
World Deaf Curling Championship; Banff, Alberta, Mar. 12–26	(United States) Herman Fuechtmann	(Ukraine) Vadym Marchenko
World Deaf Curling Championship; Banff, Alberta, Mar. 12–26	(Ukraine) Kateryna Yakymets	(Canada) Emma Logan
World Deaf Curling Championship; Banff, Alberta, Mar. 12–26	(Ukraine) Yakymets / Pleskanka	(Japan) Matsuhashi / Araya
SGI Canada Best of the West; Saskatoon, Saskatchewan, Apr. 22–24	Saskatchewan 1 (Kleiter)	Manitoba 1 (Lott)
SGI Canada Best of the West; Saskatoon, Saskatchewan, Apr. 22–24	British Columbia 1 (Brown)	Manitoba 2 (Peterson)
SGI Canada Best of the West; Saskatoon, Saskatchewan, Apr. 22–24	Saskatchewan M (Wills / Springer)	Alberta W (Rocque / Schmiemann)
Nornickel Curling Cup; Dudinka, Russia, May 26–29	(Russia) Sergey Glukhov	(Russia) Alexey Stukalskiy

== Curling Canada events ==
=== Championships ===
Event	Gold	Silver	Bronze
Canadian Mixed Curling Championship; Canmore, Alberta, Nov. 7–14	Quebec (Ménard)	Ontario (McLean)	Northwest Territories (Koe)
World Junior Qualification Event; Saskatoon, Saskatchewan, Nov. 22–27	Nova Scotia (Purcell)	Newfoundland and Labrador (Young)	Ontario (Mitchell); Saskatchewan (Bernath)
World Junior Qualification Event; Saskatoon, Saskatchewan, Nov. 22–27	Northern Ontario (Ladouceur)	Alberta (Crough)	Nova Scotia (Stevens); New Brunswick (Cluff)
Tim Hortons Curling Trials; Saskatoon, Saskatchewan, Nov. 20–28	(Newfoundland and Labrador) Brad Gushue	(Ontario) Brad Jacobs	(Alberta) Kevin Koe
Tim Hortons Curling Trials; Saskatoon, Saskatchewan, Nov. 20–28	(Manitoba) Jennifer Jones	(Manitoba) Tracy Fleury	(Ontario) Krista McCarville
Canadian Curling Club Championships; Ottawa, Ontario, Nov. 29 – Dec. 4	Nova Scotia (Deagle)	Saskatchewan (Grindheim)	Ontario (Spencer)
Canadian Curling Club Championships; Ottawa, Ontario, Nov. 29 – Dec. 4	Northern Ontario (Larocque)	Ontario (Shields)	Nova Scotia (Thompson)
Canadian Senior Curling Championships; Sault Ste. Marie, Ontario, Dec. 6–11	Alberta (White)	Ontario (Cochrane)	Saskatchewan (McKee)
Canadian Senior Curling Championships; Sault Ste. Marie, Ontario, Dec. 6–11	Saskatchewan (Anderson)	British Columbia (Arsenault)	Nova Scotia (Breen)
Canad Inns Canadian Mixed Doubles Olympic Trials; Portage la Prairie, Manitoba, Dec. 28 – Jan. 2	Cancelled		
Scotties Tournament of Hearts; Thunder Bay, Ontario, Jan. 28 – Feb. 6	Canada (Einarson)	Northern Ontario (McCarville)	New Brunswick (Crawford)
Canadian Wheelchair Curling Championship; Moose Jaw, Saskatchewan, Feb. 21–26	Cancelled		
Tim Hortons Brier; Lethbridge, Alberta, Mar. 4–13	(Newfoundland and Labrador) Wild Card #1 (Gushue)	Alberta (Koe)	Canada (Bottcher)
U Sports/Curling Canada University Curling Championships; Sudbury, Ontario, Mar. 15–19	Cancelled		
CCAA/Curling Canada College Curling Championships; Sudbury, Ontario, Mar. 15–19	Cancelled		
Subway AUS Curling Championships; Windsor, Nova Scotia, Mar. 17–19	(Nova Scotia) Dalhousie Tigers (Purcell)	(Newfoundland and Labrador) Memorial Sea-Hawks (McNeil Lamswood)	(Nova Scotia) Saint Mary's Huskies (Weagle)
Subway AUS Curling Championships; Windsor, Nova Scotia, Mar. 17–19	(Nova Scotia) Dalhousie Tigers (Gierling)	(New Brunswick) UNB Reds (Campbell)	(New Brunswick) Mount Allison Mounties (Wynter)
Canadian Mixed Doubles Curling Championship; Sudbury, Ontario, Mar. 22–27	Cancelled		
Canadian Junior Curling Championships; Stratford, Ontario, Mar. 26 – Apr. 1	Ontario (Rooney)	Alberta (Tao)	Saskatchewan (Bernath)
Canadian Junior Curling Championships; Stratford, Ontario, Mar. 26 – Apr. 1	Nova Scotia (Stevens)	Ontario (Deschenes)	Alberta 2 (Booth)
Canadian U18 Curling Championships; Oakville, Ontario, May 1–7	Saskatchewan 1 (Drewitz)	Nova Scotia 2 (Mosher)	Ontario 1 (Stratton)
Canadian U18 Curling Championships; Oakville, Ontario, May 1–7	Alberta 1 (Plett)	Alberta 2 (Booth)	British Columbia 1 (Richards)

=== Other events ===
Event	Winner	Runner-up
Continental Cup; Fredericton, New Brunswick, Jan. 20–23	Cancelled	

=== Qualification events ===
Event	Qualifiers
Canadian Curling Trials Direct-Entry Event; Ottawa, Ontario, Sep. 22–26	(Manitoba) Mike McEwen (Saskatchewan) Matt Dunstone
Canadian Curling Trials Direct-Entry Event; Ottawa, Ontario, Sep. 22–26	(Alberta) Casey Scheidegger (Alberta) Kelsey Rocque (Alberta) Laura Walker
Canadian Curling Pre-Trials Direct-Entry Event; Ottawa, Ontario, Sep. 22–26	(Quebec) Vincent Roberge (Manitoba) Sean Grassie
Canadian Curling Pre-Trials Direct-Entry Event; Ottawa, Ontario, Sep. 22–26	(Northwest Territories) Kerry Galusha (Nova Scotia) Jill Brothers
Home Hardware Olympic Pre-Trials; Liverpool, Nova Scotia, Oct. 26–31	(Manitoba) Jason Gunnlaugson (Ontario) Tanner Horgan
Home Hardware Olympic Pre-Trials; Liverpool, Nova Scotia, Oct. 26–31	(Ontario) Krista McCarville (Ontario) Jacqueline Harrison

=== Provincial and territorial playdowns ===
Province/ territory	Women			Men		
Province/ territory	Event	Champion	Runner-up	Event	Champion	Runner-up
Alberta; Grande Prairie, Jan. 3–9	Alberta Scotties	Laura Walker	Casey Scheidegger	Boston Pizza Cup	Kevin Koe	Ted Appelman
British Columbia; Kamloops, Jan. 4–9	British Columbia Scotties	Mary-Anne Arsenault	Kayla MacMillan	BC Men's Championship	Jeff Richard	Paul Cseke
Manitoba; Carberry, Dec. 15–19 (Women's); Selkirk, Feb. 9–13 (Men's)	Manitoba Scotties	Mackenzie Zacharias	Kristy Watling	Viterra Championship	Mike McEwen	Colton Lott
New Brunswick; Moncton, Jan. 5–9 (Women's); Miramichi, Feb. 9–13 (Men's)	New Brunswick Scotties	Cancelled		New Brunswick Tankard	James Grattan	Zach Eldridge
Newfoundland and Labrador; St. John's, Jan. 4–9 (Women's); Feb. 8–13 (Men's)	Newfoundland and Labrador Scotties	Cancelled		Newfoundland and Labrador Tankard	Nathan Young	Greg Smith
Northern Ontario; Kenora, Jan. 4–9 (Women's); Sault Ste. Marie, Feb. 10–13 (Men's)	Northern Ontario Scotties	Cancelled		Northern Ontario Men's Provincial Championship	Brad Jacobs	Sandy MacEwan
Northwest Territories; Inuvik, Jan. 5–10 (Women's); Fort Smith, Feb. 9–13 (Men's)	Northwest Territories Scotties	Cancelled		Northwest Territories Men's Championship	Jamie Koe	Greg Skauge
Nova Scotia; Berwick, Dec. 8–11 (Women's); New Glasgow, Feb. 8–13 (Men's)	Nova Scotia Scotties	Christina Black	Jill Brothers	Deloitte Tankard	Cancelled	
Nunavut; Iqaluit, Dec. 9–12 (Women's); Ottawa (Ontario), Jan. 27–30 (Men's)	Nunavut Scotties	Brigitte MacPhail	–	Nunavut Brier Playdowns	Peter Mackey	
Ontario; Thornhill, Apr. 7–10 (Women's); Port Elgin, Feb. 9–13 (Men's)	Ontario Scotties	Rachel Homan	Carly Howard	Ontario Tankard	Scott Howard	John Epping
Prince Edward Island; Montague, Jan. 5–9 (Women's); Jan. 26–30 (Men's)	Prince Edward Island Scotties	Cancelled		Prince Edward Island Tankard	Cancelled	
Quebec; Saguenay, Jan. 5–13 (Women's); TBD (Men's)	Quebec Scotties	Cancelled		Hogline Tankard	Cancelled	
Saskatchewan; Assiniboia, Jan. 5–9 (Women's); Whitewood, Feb. 9–13 (Men's)	Saskatchewan Scotties	Penny Barker	Chelsea Carey	SaskTel Tankard	Colton Flasch	Matt Dunstone
Yukon; Whitehorse, Jan. 6–9	Yukon Scotties	Hailey Birnie	Laura Eby	Yukon Men's Championship	Thomas Scoffin	–

== National championships ==
=== Austria ===
Event	Gold	Silver	Bronze
Austrian Men's Curling Championship; Kitzbühel, Apr. 1–3	Mathias Genner	Andreas Unterberger	Markus Schagerl
Austrian Women's Curling Championship; Kitzbühel, Apr. 1–3	Marijke Reitsma	Teresa Treichel	Hannah Augustin
Austrian Mixed Doubles Curling Championship; Kitzbühel, Feb. 26–28	Augustin / Reichel	Pflüger / Hofer	Haidinger / Seiwald

=== Czech Republic ===
Event	Gold	Silver	Bronze
Czech Men's Curling Championship; Prague, Mar. 3–8	Lukáš Klíma	Karel Hradec	David Šik
Czech Women's Curling Championship; Prague, Mar. 3–8	Alžběta Baudyšová	Hana Synáčková	Karolína Špundová
Czech Mixed Doubles Curling Championship; Prague, Feb. 26 – Mar. 1	Zelingrová / Chabičovský	Paulová / Paul	Jelínková / Mihola

=== Denmark ===
Event	Gold	Silver	Bronze
Danish Mixed Doubles Curling Championship; Esbjerg, Mar. 5–6	Clifford / Søe	Lander / Holtermann	Schack / Thune

=== England ===
Event	Gold	Silver	Bronze
English Men's Curling Championship; Dumfries, Feb. 24–27	Andrew Woolston	Jotham Sugden	Owen Rees

=== Estonia ===
Event	Gold	Silver	Bronze
Estonian Men's Curling Championship; Tallinn, Apr. 7–10	Eduard Veltsman	Andres Jakobson	Kaarel Holm
Estonian Women's Curling Championship; Tallinn, Apr. 7–10	Marie Kaldvee	Triin Madisson	Tene Link
Estonian Mixed Doubles Curling Championship; Tallinn, Mar. 17–20	Kaldvee / Lill	Madisson / Kukner	Elmik / Vlassov

=== Finland ===
Event	Gold	Silver	Bronze
Finnish Mixed Doubles Curling Championship; Joensuu, Mar. 24–27	Immonen / Sipilä	S. Säntti / I. Säntti	Virtaala / Forsström

=== Hungary ===
Event	Gold	Silver	Bronze
Hungarian Mixed Doubles Curling Championship; Budapest, Mar. 11–16	Szekeres / Nagy	Joó / Tatár	Halász / Ézsöl

=== Ireland ===
Event	Gold	Silver
Irish Men's Curling Championship; Dumfries, Scotland, Jan. 22–23	John Wilson	Arran Cameron

=== Italy ===
Event	Gold	Silver	Bronze
Italian Men's Curling Championship; Oct. 21 – Mar. 22, Mar. 26–27	Joël Retornaz	Luca Rizzolli	Giacomo Colli
Italian Women's Curling Championship; Oct. 19 – Mar. 13, Apr. 2–3	Stefania Constantini	Giada Mosaner	Angela Romei

=== Japan ===
Event	Gold	Silver	Bronze
Japan Men's Curling Championship; Tokoro, May 22–29	Riku Yanagisawa	Hayato Sato	Yasumasa Tanida
Japan Women's Curling Championship; Tokoro, May 22–29	Satsuki Fujisawa	Ikue Kitazawa	Momoha Tabata

=== Latvia ===
Event	Gold	Silver	Bronze
Latvian Men's Curling Championship; Riga, May 12–15	Mārtiņš Trukšāns	Ritvars Gulbis	Kristaps Zass
Latvian Women's Curling Championship; Riga, April 14–17	Santa Blumberga-Bērziņa	Evelīna Barone	Daina Barone
Latvian Mixed Doubles Curling Championship; Riga, February 9–13	Barone / Veidemanis	Blumberga-Bērziņa / Jučers	D. Regža / A. Regža

=== Mexico ===
Event	Gold	Silver
Mexican Mixed Doubles Curling Championship; Vancouver, Canada Apr. 16–17	Pérez / Cohen	Quintero / Abreu

=== New Zealand ===
Event	Gold	Silver	Bronze
New Zealand Men's Curling Championship; Naseby, Jun. 10–13	Sean Becker	Anton Hood	Garion Long
New Zealand Women's Curling Championship; Naseby, Jun. 11–13	Bridget Becker	Courtney Smith	Grace Apuwai-Bishop

=== Norway ===
Event	Gold	Silver	Bronze
Norwegian Men's Curling Championship; Trondheim, Mar. 3–6	Magnus Ramsfjell	Steffen Walstad	Lukas Høstmælingen
Norwegian Women's Curling Championship; Haugesund, Mar. 4–6	Eirin Mesloe	Marianne Rørvik	Ingvild Skaga

=== Russia ===
Event	Gold	Silver	Bronze
Russian Men's Curling Championship; Sochi, Apr. 13–21	Alexander Eremin	Sergey Glukhov	Alexey Timofeev
Russian Women's Curling Championship; Sochi, Apr. 5–13	Nkeirouka Ezekh	Alina Kovaleva	Vlada Rumiantseva
Russian Mixed Doubles Curling Championship; Sochi, Jan. 21–26	Moskaleva / Eremin	Trukhina / Vlasenko	Morozova / Vaskov
Russian Mixed Curling Championship; Novosibirsk, May 6–10	Mikhail Vaskov	Alexey Stukalskiy	Alexander Krushelnitskiy
Russian Wheelchair Curling Championship; Samara, May 26 – June 1	Konstantin Kurokhtin	Aleksey Fatuev	Alexey Lyubimtsev

=== Scotland ===
Event	Gold	Silver	Bronze
Scottish Men's Curling Championship; Dumfries, Feb. 21–27	Ross Paterson	Ross Whyte	James Craik
Scottish Women's Curling Championship; Dumfries, Feb. 21–27	Rebecca Morrison	Fay Henderson	Amy MacDonald
Scottish Mixed Doubles Curling Championship; Perth, Mar. 2–6	Muirhead / Lammie	Dodds / Mouat	K. McMillan / Watt & Duff / H. McMillan

=== South Korea ===
Event	Gold	Silver	Bronze
Korean Men's Curling Championship; Gangneung, Jun. 23 – Jul. 3	Kim Soo-hyuk	Lee Ki-jeong	Jeong Yeong-seok
Korean Women's Curling Championship; Gangneung, Jun. 23 – Jul. 3	Kim Eun-jung	Kim Min-ji	Gim Un-chi
Korean Mixed Doubles Curling Championship; Jincheon, Jul. 27 – Aug. 6	Kim / Lee K.J.	Jang / Jeong	Yang / Lee K.B.

=== Sweden ===
Event	Gold	Silver	Bronze
Swedish Men's Curling Championship; Härnösand, Mar. 16–20	Axel Landelius	Daniel Magnusson	Sven Olsson; Joel Westerberg
Swedish Women's Curling Championship; Härnösand, Mar. 16–20	Isabella Wranå	Tova Sundberg	Emma Moberg
Swedish Mixed Doubles Curling Championship; Uppsala, Dec. 17–19	Heldin / Magnusson	Westman / Ahlberg	F. Sjöberg / A. Sjöberg

=== Switzerland ===
Event	Gold	Silver	Bronze
Swiss Men's Curling Championship; Geneva, Feb. 19–26	(Canton of Bern) Yannick Schwaller	(Canton of Glarus) Marco Hösli	(Canton of Zug) Yves Stocker
Swiss Women's Curling Championship; Geneva, Feb. 19–26	(Aargau) Silvana Tirinzoni	(Grisons) Raphaela Keiser	(Canton of Zurich) Xenia Schwaller
Swiss Mixed Doubles Curling Championship; Biel, Mar. 3–6	(Aargau) Pätz / Michel	(Canton of Solothurn) Hürlimann / Schwaller	(Canton of Zug) Rupp / Wunderlin

=== United States ===
Event	Gold	Silver	Bronze
United States Men's Curling Championship; Cedar Rapids, Iowa, Jan. 2–9	Cancelled		
United States Women's Curling Championship; Cedar Rapids, Iowa, Jan. 2–9	Cancelled		
United States Mixed Doubles Curling Championship; Middleton, Wisconsin, Mar. 8–13	(Wisconsin) B. Hamilton / M. Hamilton	(Minnesota) Walker / Stopera	(Minnesota) Sinclair / Ruohonen

== Tour events ==
Grand Slam events in bold. Note: More events may be posted as time progresses.

=== Teams ===
See: List of teams in the 2021–22 curling season

=== World Curling Tour sanctioned events ===
==== Men's events ====
Week	Event	Winning skip	Runner-up skip	Purse (CAD)	Winner's share (CAD)	EC
9	Kudaka Erzurum WCT International Curling Cup; Erzurum, Turkey, Aug. 5–8	Cancelled				
11	Baden Masters; Baden, Switzerland, Aug. 20–22	(Switzerland) Yannick Schwaller	(Switzerland) Peter de Cruz	CHF 35,000	CHF 12,000	500
13	Adelboden International; Adelboden, Switzerland, Sep. 2–5	(Switzerland) Marco Hösli	(Switzerland) Björn Jungen	CHF 4,200	CHF 1,200	100
16	WCT Tallinn Mens International Challenger; Tallinn, Estonia, Sep. 23–26	(Switzerland) Marco Hösli	(Finland) Kalle Kiiskinen	€ 3,000	€ 1,200	100
19	Curling Masters Champéry; Champéry, Switzerland, Oct. 14–17	(Norway) Steffen Walstad	(Italy) Joël Retornaz	CHF 35,000	CHF 11,000	500
20	WCT Latvian International Challenger; Tukums, Latvia, Oct. 21–24	(Scotland) Cameron Bryce	(Poland) Konrad Stych	€ 3,000	€ 1,400	100
21	Grand Prix Bern Inter Curling Challenge; Bern, Switzerland, Oct. 29–31	(Switzerland) Philipp Hösli	(Germany) Sixten Totzek	CHF 18,100	CHF 5,000	300
22	Prague Classic; Prague, Czech Republic, Nov. 4–7	(Norway) Magnus Ramsfjell	(South Korea) Lee Jeong-jae	€ 13,500	€ 4,500	300
22	Raymond James Kelowna Double Cash; Kelowna, British Columbia, Nov. 5–7	(Japan) Yuta Matsumura	(British Columbia) Cameron de Jong	$7,000	$3,000	200
28	RCF Anniversary Cup; Moscow, Russia, Dec. 15–20	Cancelled				
33	St. Galler Elite Challenge; St. Gallen, Switzerland, Jan. 21–23	(Switzerland) Marco Hösli	(Switzerland) Yannick Schwaller	CHF 5,000	$2,761	100
34	Belgium Men's Challenger; Zemst, Belgium, Jan. 27–30	Cancelled				
35	Moscow Classic; Moscow, Russia, Feb. 2–7	(Russia) Alexey Stukalskiy	(Russia) Alexey Timofeev	€ 7,000	$5,000	100

==== Women's events ====
Week	Event	Winning skip	Runner-up skip	Purse (CAD)	Winner's share (CAD)	EC
9	Kudaka Erzurum WCT International Curling Cup; Erzurum, Turkey, Aug. 5–8	Cancelled				
14	Saint Petersburg Classic; Saint Petersburg, Russia, Sep. 7–11	(Russia) Alina Kovaleva	(Scotland) Gina Aitken	€ 7,000	$3,745	100
17	Women's Masters Basel; Arlesheim, Switzerland, Oct. 1–3	(Denmark) Madeleine Dupont	(Sweden) Anna Hasselborg	CHF 35,000	CHF 11,000	500
20	WCT Latvian International Challenger; Tukums, Latvia, Oct. 21–24	(Russia) Vlada Rumiantseva	(Scotland) Amy MacDonald	€ 3,000	€ 1,400	100
22	WCT Tallinn Ladies International Challenger; Tallinn, Estonia, Nov. 4–7	(Scotland) Eve Muirhead	(Norway) Eirin Mesloe	€ 3,000	€ 1,200	100
22	Sunset Ranch Kelowna Double Cash; Kelowna, British Columbia, Nov. 5–7	(British Columbia) Kaila Buchy	(British Columbia) Mary-Anne Arsenault	$8,400	$3,000	200
28	RCF Anniversary Cup; Moscow, Russia, Dec. 15–20	Cancelled				
33	St. Galler Elite Challenge; St. Gallen, Switzerland, Jan. 21–23	(Switzerland) Nora Wüest	(Switzerland) Irene Schori	CHF 5,000	$2,761	100
34	International Bernese Ladies Cup; Bern, Switzerland, Jan. 27–30	(Switzerland) Raphaela Keiser	(Germany) Daniela Jentsch	CHF 12,000	CHF 3,500	300
35	Belgium Women's Challenger; Zemst, Belgium, Feb. 3–6	Cancelled				
46	Murom Classic; Murom, Russia, Apr. 20–25	Cancelled				

==== Mixed doubles events ====
Week	Event	Winning pair	Runner-up pair	Purse (CAD)	Winner's share (CAD)	EC
12	Pacific Cup Khabarovsk; Khabarovsk, Russia, Aug. 30 – Sep. 1	(Russia) Sidorova / Timofeev	(Hungary) Palancsa / Kiss	€ 5,000		300
13	Pacific Cup Vladivostok; Vladivostok, Russia, Sep. 1–5	(Hungary) Palancsa / Kiss	(Russia) Samoylik / Vaskov	€ 5,000		300
13	Oberstdorf International Mixed Doubles Cup; Oberstdorf, Germany, Sep. 3–5	(Sweden) Heldin / Magnusson	(Poland) Walczak / Augustyniak	€ 3,500	€ 800	300
15	WCT Tallinn Mixed Doubles International; Tallinn, Estonia, Sep. 16–19	(Czech Republic) Paulová / Paul	(Italy) Constantini / Mosaner	€ 3,325	€ 1,000	300
16	Nazarbayev Curling Cup; Almaty, Kazakhstan, Sep. 23–26	(Finland) Immonen / Sipilä	(Russia) Muraveva / Suvorov	$16,000 (US)	$5,000 (US)	750
17	Mixed Doubles Bern; Bern, Switzerland Oct. 1–3	(Norway) Skaslien / Nedregotten	(Switzerland) Perret / Rios	CHF 10,000	CHF 2,400	500
19	WCT Austrian Mixed Doubles Cup; Kitzbühel, Austria Oct. 14–17	(Switzerland) Rupp / Wunderlin	(Hungary) Palancsa / Kiss	€ 3,500	$1,298	300
21	WCT Heracles Mixed Doubles Slovakia Cup; Bratislava, Slovakia, Oct. 28–31	(South Korea) Kim / Lee	(Hungary) Palancsa / Kiss	€ 2,000	€ 1,000	100
23	Mixed Doubles Łódź; Łódź, Poland, Nov. 11–14	(Switzerland) Rupp / Wunderlin	(Estonia) Kaldvee / Lill	€ 3,500	€ 850	300
25	WCT Latvian Mixed Doubles Curling Cup I Riga, Latvia, Nov. 25–28	(Estonia) Kaldvee / Lill	(Latvia) Rudzīte / Zentelis	€ 1,000	$400	100
30	Gothenburg Mixed Doubles Cup; Gothenburg, Sweden, Dec. 28–30	(Norway) Skaslien / Nedregotten	(Sweden) de Val / Eriksson	SEK 75,000	SEK 30,000	500
30	Southern Mixed Doubles Cashspiel; Charlotte, North Carolina, Jan. 1–3	(United States) Weldon / Franey	(United States) Chao / Fowler	$4,500 (US)	$1,500 (US)	300
31	Cincinnati Mixed Doubles Cup; Cincinnati, Ohio, Jan. 7–9	(United States) Moores / Wheeler	(United States) Rohrbacher / Scebbi	$2,000 (US)	$900	100
34	Gefle Mixed Doubles Cup; Gävle, Sweden, Jan. 27–30	(Norway) Mai. Ramsfjell / Mag. Ramsfjell	(Sweden) Westman / Ahlberg	€ 3,600	€1,400	300
36	Hvidovre Mixed Doubles Cup; Hvidovre, Denmark, Feb. 11–13	(Switzerland) von Büren / Klaiber	(Spain) Otaegi / Unanue	€ 2,500	€ 1,050	100
38	WCT Tallinn Masters Mixed Doubles; Tallinn, Estonia, Mar. 10–13	(Finland) O. Kauste / A. Kauste	(Estonia) Kaldvee / Lill	€ 3,325	$1,670	300
43	Mixed Doubles Prague Trophy; Prague, Czech Republic, Apr. 1–3	(Czech Republic) Paulová / Paul	(England) A. Fowler / B. Fowler	€ 3,350	€ 1,450	300
44	WCT Latvian Mixed Doubles Curling Cup II; Riga, Latvia, Apr. 7–10	(Estonia) Kaare / Lill	(Czech Republic) Zelingrová / Chabičovský	€ 1,000		100
51	Kazakhstan Curling Cup WCT Mixed Doubles; Almaty, Kazakhstan, May 26–29	(Kazakhstan) Kolykhalova / Kudaibergenov	(Kazakhstan) Kumar / (India) Raju	$8,000 (US)		500

=== Other events ===
==== Men's events ====
Week	Event	Winning skip	Runner-up skip	Purse (CAD)	Winner's share (CAD)	SFM
2	DEKALB Superspiel 2020; Morris, Manitoba, Aug. 6–9	Cancelled				
2	Argo Graphics Cup; Kitami, Japan, Aug. 5–9	Cancelled				
3	Cargill Curling Training Centre Icebreaker; Morris, Manitoba, Aug. 13–16	Cancelled				
4	Hokkaido Bank Curling Classic; Sapporo, Japan, Aug. 19–22	(Japan) Yuta Matsumura	(Japan) Yusuke Morozumi	¥ 1,700,000	¥ 1,000,000	3.5156
4	Alberta Curling Series: Leduc; Leduc, Alberta, Aug. 20–22	(Alberta) Jeremy Harty	(Alberta) Karsten Sturmay	$4,100	$1,600	2.4803
4	Oakville Under 25 Kick-off; Oakville, Ontario, Aug. 20–22	(Ontario) Dylan Niepage	(Ontario) Nicholas Lemieux	$3,500	$1,500	1.9286
5	Oakville Fall Classic; Oakville, Ontario, Aug. 27–29	(Ontario) Glenn Howard	(Ontario) Tanner Horgan	$6,000	$2,000	3.5350
5	Curve US Open of Curling – Contender Round; Blaine, Minnesota, Aug. 27–29	(United States) Scott Dunnam	(United States) Greg Persinger	$6,000 (US)	$1,200 (US)	3.5419
6	Oakville Labour Day Classic; Oakville, Ontario, Sep. 3–6	(Ontario) Brad Jacobs	(Ontario) Tanner Horgan	$15,000	$6,000	6.2745
6	Euro Super Series; Stirling, Scotland, Aug. 31 – Sep. 5	(Switzerland) Yannick Schwaller	(Scotland) Ross Whyte	£ 6,000		5.7575
6	Craven SPORTS Services Icebreaker; Saskatoon, Saskatchewan, Sep. 3–6	Cancelled				
7	Stu Sells Oakville Tankard; Oakville, Ontario, Sep. 10–13	(Scotland) Bruce Mouat	(Ontario) Brad Jacobs	$35,000	$10,000	9.3985
7	Curve US Open of Curling – Championships; Blaine, Minnesota, Sep. 10–12	(United States) Luc Violette	(United States) Scott Dunnam	$9,500 (US)	$4,000 (US)	3.4975
7	Okotoks Under-25 Tour Spiel; Okotoks, Alberta, Sep. 10–12	(Alberta) Ryan Jacques	(Alberta) Johnson Tao	$2,900	$1,100	1.9777
8	KW Fall Classic; Waterloo, Ontario, Sep. 16–19	(Scotland) Ross Whyte	(Scotland) Kyle Waddell	$8,750	$2,300	3.5998
8	Mother Club Fall Curling Classic; Winnipeg, Manitoba, Sep. 16–19	(Manitoba) Riley Smith	(Manitoba) Braden Calvert	$5,700	$1,600	3.7908
8	Rick Rowsell Classic; St. John's, Newfoundland and Labrador, Sep. 16–19	(Newfoundland and Labrador) Andrew Symonds	(Newfoundland and Labrador) Ryan McNeil Lamswood	$6,500	$2,600	2.3423
8	California Curling Classic; Stockton, California, Sep. 17–20	Cancelled				
9	ATB Okotoks Classic; Okotoks, Alberta, Sep. 23–26	(Alberta) Kevin Koe	(Scotland) Ross Whyte	$29,000	$9,000	5.8527
9	Capital Curling Fall Men's; Ottawa, Ontario, Sep. 23–26	(Switzerland) Yves Stocker	(Quebec) Mike Fournier	$10,400	$3,000	3.6918
9	Capital Curling Fall Open (Note: Open to both genders.); Ottawa, Ontario, Sep. 23–26	(Quebec) Ted Butler	(Quebec) Jean-Michel Ménard	$5,100	$1,600	N/A
9	Torchlight Brewing Classic; Trail, British Columbia, Sep. 24–26	(British Columbia) Rob Nobert	(British Columbia) Matthew McCrady	$10,000	$4,000	2.0295
9	Craven SPORTS Services Curling Classic; Martensville, Saskatchewan, Sep. 24–26	(Saskatchewan) Daymond Bernath	(Saskatchewan) Michael Carss	$7,000	$1,470	2.0548
9	The Curling Store Cashspiel; Lower Sackville, Nova Scotia, Sep. 24–26	(Nova Scotia) Travis Colter	(Nova Scotia) Stuart Thompson	$5,800	$2,700	2.4529
9	Alliston Curling Club Cash Spiel; Alliston, Ontario, Sep. 23–26	(Ontario) Al Hutchinson	(Ontario) Brandon Tippin			N/A
9	**Kioti Tractor Tour Challenge Tier 1** Grande Prairie, Alberta, Sep. 21–26	Cancelled				
9	**Kioti Tractor Tour Challenge Tier 2** Grande Prairie, Alberta, Sep. 21–26	Cancelled				
10	SCT Sutherland; Saskatoon, Saskatchewan, Oct. 1–3	(Saskatchewan) Kody Hartung	(Saskatchewan) Daymond Bernath	$7,155	$1,650	2.4703
10	Alberta Curling Series: Avonair; Edmonton, Alberta, Oct. 1–3	(South Korea) Kim Soo-hyuk	(Alberta) Johnson Tao	$5,105	$2,042	2.1488
10	Atkins Curling Supplies Classic; Winnipeg, Manitoba, Oct. 1–3	(Manitoba) Braden Calvert	(United States) Rich Ruohonen	$9,000	$2,300	3.9724
11	IG Wealth Management Western Showdown; Swift Current, Saskatchewan, Oct. 8–11	(Alberta) Kevin Koe	(Ontario) Brad Jacobs	$50,000	$14,000	8.2344
11	Stu Sells Toronto Tankard; Toronto, Ontario, Oct. 8–11	(Newfoundland and Labrador) Brad Gushue	(Ontario) Glenn Howard	$50,000	$10,000	6.8459
11	McKee Homes Fall Curling Classic; Airdrie, Alberta, Oct. 8–11	(Alberta) Warren Cross	(Alberta) Colton Goller	$9,600	$3,000	2.2071
11	Steele Cup Cash; Fredericton, New Brunswick, Oct. 8–10	(New Brunswick) James Grattan	(Nova Scotia) Owen Purcell	$5,850	$2,000	
11	Swiss Cup Basel; Basel, Switzerland, Oct. 8–10	(Switzerland) Peter de Cruz	(Sweden) Niklas Edin	CHF 24,000	CHF 9,000	6.8266
11	Moosehead Classic; Ottawa, Ontario, Oct. 9–11	(Quebec) Alek Bédard	(Ontario) Howard Rajala	$12,200	$2,000	2.3699
11	New Scotland Brewing Mens Cash Spiel; Halifax, Nova Scotia, Oct. 8–11	Cancelled				
12	NuFloors Penticton Curling Classic; Penticton, British Columbia, Oct. 14–17	(Sweden) Niklas Edin	(Ontario) Glenn Howard	$84,000	$18,000	8.2500
12	Medicine Hat Charity Classic; Medicine Hat, Alberta, Oct. 15–18	Cancelled				
13	**Masters**; Oakville, Ontario, Oct. 19–24	(Scotland) Bruce Mouat	(Ontario) Brad Jacobs	$150,000	$33,000	12.1481
13	Dave Jones Stanhope Simpson Insurance Mayflower Cashspiel; Halifax, Nova Scotia, Oct. 21–24	(Nova Scotia) Paul Flemming	(Quebec) Robert Desjardins	$18,800	$3,600	3.7790
13	Alberta Curling Series: Thistle; Edmonton, Alberta, Oct. 22–24	(Alberta) Terry Meek	(Alberta) Parker Konschuh	$6,636	$2,057	2.1789
13	Kamloops Crown of Curling; Kamloops, British Columbia, Oct. 22–24	(South Korea) Kim Soo-hyuk	(British Columbia) Jeff Richard	$12,200	$4,000	2.2785
13	SaskTour Men's Highland; Regina, Saskatchewan, Oct. 22–24	(Saskatchewan) Shaun Meachem	(Saskatchewan) Kelly Knapp	$8,415	$2,020	2.5995
14	Atlantic Superstore Monctonian Challenge; Moncton, New Brunswick, Oct. 29–31	(New Brunswick) James Grattan	(Nova Scotia) Matthew Manuel	$12,750	$2,300	2.4633
14	Challenge Nord-Ouest Air Creebec; Val-d'Or, Quebec, Oct. 28–31	(Quebec) Alek Bédard	(Quebec) Jean-Sébastien Roy	$12,500	$3,100	1.9065
15	**BOOST National**; Chestermere, Alberta, Nov. 2–7	(Newfoundland and Labrador) Brad Gushue	(Scotland) Bruce Mouat	$150,000	$33,000	12.2306
15	Alberta Curling Series: Camrose; Camrose, Alberta, Nov. 5–7	(Alberta) Nathan Molberg	(Alberta) Ryan Parent	$5,105	$2,093	1.7581
15	Bally Haly Cash Spiel; St. John's, Newfoundland and Labrador, Nov. 4–7	(Nova Scotia) Owen Purcell	(Newfoundland and Labrador) Greg Smith	$7,560	$2,400	1.9675
15	SaskTour Men's Nutana; Saskatoon, Saskatchewan, Nov. 5–7	(Saskatchewan) Kody Hartung	(Saskatchewan) Rylan Kleiter	$10,780	$2,575	3.1640
16	Stu Sells 1824 Halifax Classic; Halifax, Nova Scotia, Nov. 10–14	(Nova Scotia) Stuart Thompson	(Quebec) Félix Asselin	$24,000	$7,500	4.5630
16	Stu Sells Port Elgin Superspiel; Port Elgin, Ontario, Nov. 12–14	(Ontario) Pat Ferris	(Ontario) Mark Kean	$11,100	$3,000	2.7115
16	Original 16 Tour Bonspiel; Calgary, Alberta, Nov. 12–14	(British Columbia) Tyler Tardi	(Alberta) Jeremy Harty	$19,500	$5,000	3.3557
17	Vesta Energy Curling Classic; Red Deer, Alberta, Nov. 19–22	(Alberta) Ryan Jacques	(Saskatchewan) Colton Flasch	$35,000	$10,000	5.3077
17	Stu Sells Brantford NISSAN Classic; Brantford, Ontario, Nov. 19–21	(Ontario) Sam Mooibroek	(Ontario) Paul Moffatt	$11,100	$3,000	2.8682
17	Ashley Homestore Classic; Salmon Arm, British Columbia, Nov. 18–21	(British Columbia) Jim Cotter	(British Columbia) Rob Nobert	$11,000	$5,000	1.9385
17	SaskTour Men's Moose Jaw; Saskatoon, Saskatchewan, Nov. 19–21	(Saskatchewan) Kelly Knapp	(Manitoba) Corey Chambers	$6,555	$1,705	2.0780
17	Thunder Bay Tour Spiel; Thunder Bay, Ontario, Nov. 19–21	Cancelled				
18	Challenge Casino de Charlevoix; Clermont, Quebec, Nov. 25–28	(Quebec) Mike Fournier	(Nova Scotia) Paul Flemming	$27,000	$8,000	3.6958
18	MCT Championships; Winnipeg, Manitoba, Nov. 26–28	(Manitoba) Ryan Wiebe	(Manitoba) Riley Smith	$5,000	$1,600	3.2370
18	Mile Zero Cash Spiel; Dawson Creek, British Columbia, Nov. 26–28	(Alberta) Graham Powell	(British Columbia) Jeff Ginter	$8,400	$3,000	1.4762
18	1000 Islands Gananoque Open Cash Spiel; Gananoque, Ontario, Nov. 26–28	Cancelled				
19	DEKALB Superspiel 2021; Morris, Manitoba, Dec. 3–6	(Manitoba) Jason Gunnlaugson	(Alberta) Karsten Sturmay	$36,000	$11,000	5.5721
19	Finale du Circuit; Sorel-Tracy, Quebec, Dec. 3–5	(Quebec) Vincent Roberge	(Quebec) Mike Fournier	$11,420	$1,640	2.3473
19	Scott Comfort RE/MAX Blue Chip Realty SCT; Wadena, Saskatchewan, Dec. 3–5	(Saskatchewan) Jason Jacobson	(Saskatchewan) Kelly Knapp	$8,025	$1,925	2.3256
19	King Cash Spiel; Maple Ridge, British Columbia, Dec. 3–5	(British Columbia) Sébastien Robillard	(British Columbia) Dean Joanisse	$11,400	$4,000	2.0723
21	ATB Banff Classic; Banff, Alberta, Dec. 17–19	(Ontario) John Epping	(Alberta) Kevin Koe	$23,000	$9,000	5.7109
21	Curl Mesabi Classic; Eveleth, Minnesota, Dec. 17–19	(United States) Rich Ruohonen	(United States) John Shuster	$21,000 (US)	$5,178	3.2840
21	Driving Force Decks Int'l Abbotsford Cashspiel; Abbotsford, British Columbia, Dec. 17–20	Cancelled				
24	Brandon Berth Bonspiel; Brandon, Manitoba, Jan. 7–9	Cancelled				
24	SCT Players Championship; Swift Current, Saskatchewan, Jan. 7–9	(Saskatchewan) Ryan Deis	(Saskatchewan) Shaun Meachem	$12,600	$3,030	2.8320
25	**Meridian Open**; Camrose, Alberta, Jan. 14–16	Cancelled				
27	Alberta Curling Series: Acadia; Calgary, Alberta, Jan. 28–30	Cancelled				
28	Alberta Curling Series: Jasper; Jasper, Alberta, Feb. 4–6	Cancelled				
31	Alberta Curling Series: St. Albert; St. Albert, Alberta, Feb. 25–27	Cancelled				
36	Alberta Curling Tour Championship; Leduc, Alberta, Mar. 31 – Apr. 1	(Alberta) Karsten Sturmay	(Alberta) Brendan Bottcher	$17,500	$8,000	4.5459
38	**Princess Auto Players' Championship**; Toronto, Ontario, Apr. 12–17	(Scotland) Bruce Mouat	(Sweden) Niklas Edin	$175,000	$40,000	12.2719
41	**KIOTI Tractor Champions Cup**; Olds, Alberta, May 3–8	(Newfoundland and Labrador) Brad Gushue	(Alberta) Kevin Koe	$150,000	$30,000	9.9138

==== Women's events ====
Week	Event	Winning skip	Runner-up skip	Purse (CAD)	Winner's share (CAD)	SFM
2	DEKALB Superspiel 2020; Morris, Manitoba, Aug. 6–9	Cancelled				
2	Argo Graphics Cup; Kitami, Japan, Aug. 5–9	Cancelled				
3	Cargill Curling Training Centre Icebreaker; Morris, Manitoba, Aug. 13–16	Cancelled				
4	Hokkaido Bank Curling Classic; Sapporo, Japan, Aug. 19–22	(Japan) Tori Koana	(Japan) Satsuki Fujisawa	¥ 1,700,000	¥ 1,000,000	5.4281
4	Alberta Curling Series: Leduc; Leduc, Alberta, Aug. 20–22	(British Columbia) Corryn Brown	(Alberta) Lindsay Bertsch	$6,200	$2,000	3.5450
4	Oakville Under 25 Kick-off; Oakville, Ontario, Aug. 20–22	(Ontario) Isabelle Ladouceur	(Ontario) Abby Deschene	$5,000	$1,500	2.3400
5	Oakville Fall Classic; Oakville, Ontario, Aug. 27–29	(United States) Jamie Sinclair	(Prince Edward Island) Suzanne Birt	$3,800	$1,500	3.2636
5	Curve US Open of Curling – Contender Round; Blaine, Minnesota, Aug. 27–29	(United States) Kim Rhyme	(United States) Rachel Workin	$6,000 (US)	$1,200 (US)	2.7668
6	Oakville Labour Day Classic; Oakville, Ontario, Sep. 3–6	(Manitoba) Tracy Fleury	(Prince Edward Island) Suzanne Birt	$20,000	$7,000	5.6450
6	Euro Super Series; Stirling, Scotland, Aug. 31 – Sep. 5	(Scotland) Rebecca Morrison	(Sweden) Isabella Wranå	£ 6,000		5.1800
6	Craven SPORTS Services Icebreaker; Saskatoon, Saskatchewan, Sep. 3–5	(Saskatchewan) Sherry Anderson	(Saskatchewan) Ashley Howard	$4,150	$1,500	2.7086
7	Alberta Curling Series: Saville Shoot-Out; Edmonton, Alberta, Sep. 10–12	(South Korea) Kim Eun-jung	(Alberta) Laura Walker	$19,155	$5,746	6.6597
7	Curve US Open of Curling – Championships; Blaine, Minnesota, Sep. 10–12	(United States) Tabitha Peterson	(United States) Jamie Sinclair	$7,000 (US)	$4,000 (US)	
7	Stu Sells Oakville Tankard; Oakville, Ontario, Sep. 10–12	(Ontario) Hollie Duncan	(Northwest Territories) Kerry Galusha	$12,600	$5,500	4.3158
7	California Curling Classic; Stockton, California, Sep. 10–13	Cancelled				
8	Sherwood Park Women's Curling Classic; Sherwood Park, Alberta, Sep. 17–19	(Manitoba) Tracy Fleury	(Manitoba) Kerri Einarson	$13,759	$4,128	6.4715
8	KW Fall Classic; Waterloo, Ontario, Sep. 16–19	(Northwest Territories) Kerry Galusha	(Ontario) Hollie Duncan	$12,625	$3,200	4.2370
8	Mother Club Fall Curling Classic; Winnipeg, Manitoba, Sep. 16–19	(Manitoba) Mackenzie Zacharias	(Manitoba) Beth Peterson	$3,800	$1,200	3.8053
8	Rick Rowsell Classic; St. John's, Newfoundland and Labrador, Sep. 16–19	(Newfoundland and Labrador) Mackenzie Mitchell	(Newfoundland and Labrador) Erica Curtis	$2,500	$1,400	
9	The Challenger; Basel, Switzerland, Sep. 24–26	(Scotland) Eve Muirhead	(Switzerland) Irene Schori	CHF 4,200	CHF 1,800	4.8060
9	Craven SPORTS Services Curling Classic; Saskatoon, Saskatchewan, Sep. 24–26	(Saskatchewan) Chelsea Carey	(Saskatchewan) Jessica Mitchell	$7,750	$1,600	3.2642
9	The Curling Store Cashspiel; Lower Sackville, Nova Scotia, Sep. 24–26	(Nova Scotia) Christina Black	(New Brunswick) Andrea Crawford	$5,800	$2,700	2.5697
9	**Kioti Tractor Tour Challenge Tier 1** Grande Prairie, Alberta, Sep. 21–26	Cancelled				
9	**Kioti Tractor Tour Challenge Tier 2** Grande Prairie, Alberta, Sep. 21–26	Cancelled				
9	Torchlight Brewing Classic; Trail, British Columbia, Sep. 24–26	Cancelled				
10	SCT Martensville; Martensville, Saskatchewan, Oct. 1–3	(Saskatchewan) Sherry Anderson	(Saskatchewan) Michelle Englot	$4,800	$1,000	3.0104
10	Alberta Curling Series: Avonair 1 Edmonton, Alberta, Oct. 1–3	(Alberta) Krysta Hilker	(Alberta) Abby Marks	$8,200	$2,624	2.9913
10	Atkins Curling Supplies Classic; Winnipeg, Manitoba, Oct. 1–3	(United States) Jamie Sinclair	(Manitoba) Kristy Watling	$6,000	$2,500	3.3912
11	Curlers Corner Autumn Gold Curling Classic; Calgary, Alberta, Oct. 8–11	(United States) Tabitha Peterson	(Japan) Satsuki Fujisawa	$44,000	$12,000	9.7313
11	Stu Sells Toronto Tankard; Toronto, Ontario, Oct. 8–11	(Ontario) Hollie Duncan	(Ontario) Shannon Jay	$16,000	$5,000	5.1266
11	Steele Cup Cash; Fredericton, New Brunswick, Oct. 8–10	(New Brunswick) Melodie Forsythe	(New Brunswick) Andrea Crawford	$3,150	$1,200	
11	New Scotland Clothing Women's Cashspiel; Halifax, Nova Scotia, Oct. 8–11	Cancelled				
12	Thunder Bay Tour Spiel; Thunder Bay, Ontario, Oct. 14–17	Cancelled				
12	Medicine Hat Charity Classic; Medicine Hat, Alberta, Oct. 15–18	Cancelled				
13	**Masters**; Oakville, Ontario, Oct. 19–24	(Manitoba) Tracy Fleury	(Manitoba) Jennifer Jones	$150,000	$33,000	11.8800
13	Dave Jones Stanhope Simpson Insurance Mayflower Cashspiel; Halifax, Nova Scotia, Oct. 21–24	(New Brunswick) Andrea Crawford	(Nova Scotia) Jill Brothers	$8,800	$2,500	2.6382
13	Alberta Curling Series: Thistle; Edmonton, Alberta, Oct. 22–24	(Germany) Daniela Jentsch	(Alberta) Kayla Skrlik	$5,105	$2,093	2.8325
13	SaskTour Women's Nutana; Saskatoon, Saskatchewan, Oct. 1–3	(Saskatchewan) Jessica Mitchell	(Manitoba) Kaitlyn Jones	$12,000	$1,600	3.5852
13	Kamloops Crown of Curling; Kamloops, British Columbia, Oct. 22–24	Cancelled				
14	Atlantic Superstore Monctonian Challenge; Moncton, New Brunswick, Oct. 29–31	(New Brunswick) Andrea Crawford	(Nova Scotia) Christina Black	$6,000	$2,200	2.4637
14	Boundary Ford Curling Classic; Lloydminster, Saskatchewan, Oct. 29–31	(South Korea) Gim Un-chi	(South Korea) Kim Hye-rin	$16,400	$4,200	4.6555
15	**BOOST National**; Chestermere, Alberta, Nov. 2–7	(Sweden) Anna Hasselborg	(Manitoba) Tracy Fleury	$150,000	$33,000	11.7769
15	Alberta Curling Series: Camrose; Camrose, Alberta, Nov. 5–7	(Alberta) Casey Scheidegger	(Japan) Tori Koana	$7,657	$2,374	2.9502
15	Bally Haly Cash Spiel; St. John's, Newfoundland and Labrador, Nov. 4–7	(Newfoundland and Labrador) Heather Strong	(Newfoundland and Labrador) Erica Curtis	$2,375		
15	SaskTour Women's Moose Jaw; Moose Jaw, Saskatchewan, Nov. 5–7	(Saskatchewan) Penny Barker	(Manitoba) Kristy Watling	$8,000	$1,600	3.7821
16	Stu Sells 1824 Halifax Classic; Halifax, Nova Scotia, Nov. 10–14	(Prince Edward Island) Suzanne Birt	(Switzerland) Briar Hürlimann	$24,000	$7,500	4.0365
16	Ladies Alberta Open; Okotoks, Alberta, Nov. 12–14	(South Korea) Gim Un-chi	(Alberta) Lindsay Bertsch	$6,000	$2,400	2.7444
17	Vesta Energy Curling Classic; Red Deer, Alberta, Nov. 19–22	(Japan) Satsuki Fujisawa	(South Korea) Gim Un-chi	$35,000	$10,000	6.5850
17	Tim Hortons Spitfire Arms Cash Spiel; Windsor, Nova Scotia, Nov. 19–21	(Nova Scotia) Christina Black	(Nova Scotia) Jennifer Crouse	$10,500	$3,000	3.0797
17	Gord Carroll Curling Classic – Presented by D & R Custom Steel; Whitby, Ontario, Nov. 19–21	(Ontario) Jestyn Murphy	(Ontario) Lauren Mann	$8,000	$2,800	2.8681
17	SaskTour Women's Weyburn; Weyburn, Saskatchewan, Nov. 19–21	(Saskatchewan) Penny Barker	(Saskatchewan) Mandy Selzer	$4,800	$1,100	2.6404
18	Part II Bistro Ladies Classic; Wingham, Ontario, Nov. 26–28	(Switzerland) Irene Schori	(Ontario) Cathy Auld	$5,600	$2,500	2.7972
18	MCT Championships; Winnipeg, Manitoba, Nov. 26–28	(Manitoba) Mackenzie Zacharias	(Manitoba) Kristy McDonald	$4,000	$1,600	3.2850
19	DEKALB Superspiel 2021; Morris, Manitoba, Dec. 3–6	(Saskatchewan) Amber Holland	(British Columbia) Kayla MacMillan	$24,000	$7,800	4.7736
19	SaskTel Curling Stadium Swift Current Women's Spiel; Swift Current, Saskatchewan, Dec. 3–5	(Saskatchewan) Robyn Silvernagle	(Saskatchewan) Michelle Englot	$6,000	$1,200	3.0625
19	King Cash Spiel; Maple Ridge, British Columbia, Dec. 3–5	(British Columbia) Taylor Reese-Hansen	(British Columbia) Kristen Ryan	$5,700	$2,800	0.9000
21	Curl Mesabi Classic; Eveleth, Minnesota, Dec. 17–19	(United States) Tabitha Peterson	(United States) Cory Christensen	$21,000 (US)	$5,178	3.8025
21	Alberta Curling Series: Avonair 2 Edmonton, Alberta, Dec. 17–19	(Alberta) Laura Walker	(Alberta) Casey Scheidegger	$4,100	$2,113	3.6753
21	Driving Force Decks Int'l Abbotsford Cashspiel; Abbotsford, British Columbia, Dec. 17–20	Cancelled				
25	**Meridian Open**; Camrose, Alberta, Jan. 14–16	Cancelled				
27	Alberta Curling Series: Acadia; Calgary, Alberta, Jan. 28–30	Cancelled				
28	Indus Cash Spiel; Indus, Alberta, Feb. 4–6	Cancelled				
29	Alberta Curling Series: Airdrie; Airdrie, Alberta, Feb. 11–13	Cancelled				
31	Alberta Curling Series: St. Albert; St. Albert, Alberta, Feb. 25–27	Cancelled				
32	Curling Stadium Women's Challenge; Martensville, Saskatchewan, Mar. 4–6	Cancelled				
36	Alberta Curling Tour Championship; Leduc, Alberta, Mar. 31 – Apr. 1	(Alberta) Abby Marks	(Alberta) Kayla Skrlik	$17,500	$8,000	4.0537
38	**Princess Auto Players' Championship**; Toronto, Ontario, Apr. 12–17	(Sweden) Anna Hasselborg	(Manitoba) Kerri Einarson	$175,000	$35,000	12.0656
41	**KIOTI Tractor Champions Cup**; Olds, Alberta, May 3–8	(Manitoba) Kerri Einarson	(South Korea) Gim Eun-ji	$150,000	$30,000	9.9619

==== Mixed doubles events ====
Week	Event	Winning pair	Runner-up pair	Purse (CAD)	Winner's share (CAD)	SFM
3	Curve US Open of Curling – Mixed Doubles; Blaine, Minnesota, Aug. 13–15	(United States) Walker / Leichter	(United States) Peterson / Polo	$7,000 (US)		3.0996
4	Cameron's Brewing Mixed Doubles Cashspiel; Oakville, Ontario, Aug. 20–22	(Ontario) McLaughlin / Horgan	(Ontario) Brunton / Lyon-Hatcher	$6,000	$1,500	4.3352
5	Alberta Curling Series: Leduc; Leduc, Alberta, Aug. 27–29	(Alberta) Marks / Kennedy	(Alberta) Wilkes / Thiessen	$6,000	$1,300	3.8467
7	Stadler European Mixed Doubles Invitational; Biel, Switzerland, Sep. 10–12	(Switzerland) Rupp / Wunderlin	(Italy) Constantini / Mosaner	CHF 5,600	$2,893	7.2809
7	GOLDLINE Boucherville Mixed Doubles; Boucherville, Quebec, Sep. 10–12	(Quebec) É. Desjardins / R. Desjardins	(Quebec) St-Georges / Asselin	$3,000	$630	4.0526
7	Craven SPORTS Services Mixed Doubles; Martensville, Saskatchewan, Sep. 10–12	(Saskatchewan) Hersikorn / Laycock	(Saskatchewan) Hodson / Joyce	$4,200	$1,100	2.6696
8	Aly Jenkins Mixed Doubles Memorial; Martensville, Saskatchewan, Sep. 15–19	(Sweden) I. Wranå / R. Wranå	(Ontario) Weagle / Epping	$32,000	$8,000	6.0641
8	GOLDLINE Double Mixte Express; Chicoutimi / Alma, Quebec, Sep. 17–19	(Ontario) K. Tuck / W. Tuck	(Ontario) Wasylkiw / Konings	$4,000	$640	4.3200
8	California Curling Classic; Stockton, California, Sep. 14–16	Cancelled				
9	Oakville Mixed Doubles Classic; Oakville, Ontario, Sep. 24–27	(Ontario) Wasylkiw / Konings	(Alberta) Sauder / (Ontario) Harrison	$3,500	$650	3.0736
9	Cargill Curling Training Centre MCT Mixed Doubles; Morris, Manitoba, Sep. 17–19	(Manitoba) Sahaidak / Lott	(Manitoba) M. Walter / B. Walter	$650	$400	1.8786
10	Qualico Mixed Doubles Classic; Banff / Camrose, Alberta, Sep. 30 – Oct. 3	(Alberta) Homan / Morris	(Manitoba) Peterman / (Newfoundland and Labrador) Gallant	$30,000	$8,000	7.0347
12	GOLDLINE Valleyfield Mixed Doubles; Valleyfield, Quebec, Sep. 15–17	(Ontario) Grandy / Janssen	(Ontario) Waye / Retchless	$4,000	$840	4.0650
13	Norway Open Mixed Doubles; Hedmarken, Norway, Oct. 22–24	(Norway) Mai. Ramsfjell / Mag. Ramsfjell	(Switzerland) Hueppi / Weiss	NOK 10,000	$729	1.7240
13	NexusBioAg Dauphin Mixed Doubles; Dauphin, Manitoba, Oct. 23–24	(Manitoba) M. Lyburn / W. Lyburn	(Manitoba) McKenzie / Dunlop	$3,000	$1,000	
13	Thunder Bay Mixed Doubles Spiel; Thunder Bay, Ontario, Oct. 21–24	Cancelled				
14	Okotoks Mixed Doubles; Okotoks, Alberta, Oct. 30–31	(Australia) Gill / Hewitt	(Alberta) Walker / (Saskatchewan) Muyres	$6,400	$1,800	2.9381
14	Palmerston Mixed Doubles Spiel; Palmerston, Ontario, Oct. 30–31	(Ontario) Ca. Liscumb / Ch. Liscumb	(Ontario) Jewer / Currie	$3,000		3.0429
14	SCT Mixed Doubles – Prince Albert; Prince Albert, Saskatchewan, Oct. 29–31	Cancelled				
15	GOLDLINE Clermont Mixed Doubles; Clermont, Quebec, Nov. 5–7	(Ontario) Brunton / Lyon-Hatcher	(Quebec) Bouchard / Charest	$3,000	$500	3.0275
16	St. Thomas Mixed Doubles Classic; St. Thomas, Ontario, Nov. 12–14	(Ontario) Grandy / Janssen	(Ontario) Neil / McDonald	$4,700	$1,200	3.3699
16	SCT Mixed Doubles – Wadena; Wadena, Saskatchewan, Nov. 12–14	(Saskatchewan) Kitz / Wills	(Saskatchewan) Englot / Schneider	$3,580	$1,100	1.8645
16	Tōhoku Mixed Doubles Curling Championship; Tōhoku, Japan, Nov. 13–14	Cancelled				
17	GOLDLINE Sherbrooke Mixed Doubles; Sherbrooke, Quebec, Nov. 19–21	(Quebec) É. Desjardins / R. Desjardins	(Quebec) L. Cheal / G. Cheal	$3,000	$580	2.9016
17	Ilderton Mixed Doubles Spiel; Ilderton, Ontario, Nov. 20–21	(Ontario) Ca. Liscumb / Ch. Liscumb	(Ontario) M. Foster / S. Foster	$1,600	$800	3.1902
18	Fredericton Mixed Doubles; Fredericton, New Brunswick, Nov. 26–28	(New Brunswick) Adams / Robichaud	(New Brunswick) McLeod / Eldridge	$1,950	$600	1.9826
18	SaskTel Curling Stadium Swift Current Doubles; Swift Current, Saskatchewan, Nov. 26–28	(Saskatchewan) Barber / Heidt	(Saskatchewan) Just / Deis	$3,400	$1,000	2.1778
19	NuFloors Vernon Mixed Doubles Curling Classic; Vernon, British Columbia, Dec. 3–5	(Saskatchewan) Martin / (British Columbia) Griffith	(Saskatchewan) Kitz / Stewart	$7,000	$2,500	3.4516
19	Swiss Curling Mixed Doubles Super League; St. Gallen, Switzerland, Dec. 2–5	Cancelled				
20	Cooper Equipment Mixed Doubles Cashspiel; Brantford, Ontario, Dec. 9–12	(Quebec) St-Georges / Asselin	(Alberta) Carey / (Ontario) Hodgson	$30,000	$7,000	6.7560
20	GOLDLINE Victoria Mixed Doubles; Quebec, Quebec, Dec. 10–12	(Quebec) Horton / Morissette	(Quebec) É. Desjardins / R. Desjardins	$4,000	$840	3.3450
20	Alberta Curling Series: Beaumont; Beaumont, Alberta, Dec. 10–12	(Alberta) Sweeting / Kennedy	(Alberta) Papley / van Amsterdam	$2,452	$1,005	1.9484
20	Brandon Mixed Doubles Classic; Brandon, Manitoba, Dec. 11–12	(Manitoba) M. Walter / B. Walter	(Manitoba) Fordyce / Irwin	$1,700		
21	Thunder Bay Mixed Doubles Spiel; Thunder Bay, Ontario, Dec. 16–18	Cancelled				
23	SCT Mixed Doubles – Aberdeen; Aberdeen, Saskatchewan, Dec. 31 – Jan. 3	Cancelled				
24	British Curling Aberdeen International Mixed Doubles; Aberdeen, Scotland, Jan. 3–5	(Scotland) Dodds / Mouat	(Scotland) Wright / Hardie	GBP 2,000	$800	2.7776
25	Stu Sells Mixed Doubles Championship; Toronto, Ontario, Jan. 13–16	Cancelled				
25	Alberta Curling Series: Jasper; Jasper, Alberta, Jan. 14–16	Cancelled				
26	WMB McArthur Island Mixed Doubles; Kamloops, British Columbia, Jan. 21–23	Cancelled				
27	SCT Mixed Doubles – Aberdeen; Aberdeen, Saskatchewan, Jan. 28–30	(Saskatchewan) Martin / Grindheim	(Saskatchewan) Hersikorn / Laycock	$4,000	$1,200	2.0898
27	GOLDLINE L'Abitibi Mixed Doubles; Val-d'Or, Quebec, Jan. 28–30	Cancelled				
28	Moose Jaw Ford Curling Centre Doubles; Moose Jaw, Saskatchewan, Feb. 4–6	(Saskatchewan) Kitz / Wills	(Saskatchewan) J. Springer / G. Springer	$3,000	$1,200	2.0910
29	WFG Okotoks Mixed Doubles; Okotoks, Alberta, Feb. 12–13	(Alberta) Sauder / Robinson	(Alberta) Tran / Sluchinski	$3,800	$1,300	2.0927
30	Ontario Mixed Doubles Tour Championship; Wingham, Ontario, Feb. 18–20	(Ontario) McLaughlin / Horgan	(Ontario) Sandham / Craig	$5,200	$1,500	3.3654
32	GOLDLINE Chicoutimi Mixed Doubles; Chicoutimi, Quebec, Mar. 4–6	(Quebec) Gagné / Morissette	(Quebec) Cottenoir / Martel	$3,000	$430	2.2363
32	Alberta Curling Series: Cold Lake; Cold Lake, Alberta, Mar. 4–6	Cancelled				
35	Leduc Mixed Doubles Players' Championship; Leduc, Alberta, Mar. 24–27	(Alberta) Rocque / (Ontario) Epping	(Alberta) Carey / (Saskatchewan) Kleiter	$20,000	$5,000	5.3274
37	Finale Circuit GOLDLINE; La Baie, Quebec, Apr. 8–11	(Quebec) L. Cheal / G. Cheal	(Quebec) Gagnon / Gionest	$10,000	$1,300	3.3827

== WCF rankings ==
Men

After Week 41
#	Skip	YTD	OOM
1	(Newfoundland and Labrador) Brad Gushue	576.877	576.877
2	(Scotland) Bruce Mouat	495.041	495.041
3	(Sweden) Niklas Edin	481.178	481.178
4	(Alberta) Kevin Koe	408.072	408.072
5	(Ontario) Brad Jacobs	360.809	360.809
6	(Alberta) Brendan Bottcher	288.696	288.696
7	(Manitoba) Jason Gunnlaugson	224.642	224.642
8	(Italy) Joël Retornaz	223.968	223.968
9	(Ontario) Glenn Howard	215.095	215.095
10	(Manitoba) Mike McEwen	214.115	214.115
11	(Saskatchewan) Matt Dunstone	206.531	206.531
12	(Scotland) Ross Whyte	202.721	202.721
13	(Saskatchewan) Colton Flasch	202.667	202.667
14	(Switzerland) Yannick Schwaller	202.488	202.488
15	(Norway) Steffen Walstad	199.535	199.535

Women

After Week 41
#	Skip	YTD	OOM
1	(Sweden) Anna Hasselborg	451.017	451.017
2	(Manitoba) Tracy Fleury	425.627	425.627
3	(Scotland) Eve Muirhead	393.233	393.233
4	(Manitoba) Kerri Einarson	390.033	390.033
5	(Switzerland) Silvana Tirinzoni	347.654	347.654
6	(Japan) Satsuki Fujisawa	306.655	306.655
7	(South Korea) Kim Eun-jung	271.759	271.759
8	(Manitoba) Jennifer Jones	267.230	267.230
9	(Ontario) Rachel Homan	237.377	237.377
10	(South Korea) Gim Eun-ji	203.940	203.940
11	(United States) Tabitha Peterson	195.156	195.156
12	(Alberta) Laura Walker	183.645	183.645
13	(Sweden) Isabella Wranå	180.723	180.723
14	(Saskatchewan) Chelsea Carey	171.372	171.372
15	(Manitoba) Mackenzie Zacharias	165.854	165.854

Mixed Doubles

After Week 41
#	Team	YTD	OOM
1	(Norway) Skaslien / Nedregotten	299.672	299.672
2	(Scotland) Muirhead / Lammie	286.808	286.808
3	(Sweden) de Val / Eriksson	272.368	272.368
4	(Italy) Constantini / Mosaner	260.957	260.957
5	(Switzerland) Rupp / Wunderlin	259.071	259.071
6	(Switzerland) Pätz / Michel	218.872	218.872
7	(Scotland) Dodds / Mouat	208.012	208.012
8	(Switzerland) Perret / Rios	202.052	202.052
9	(Czech Republic) Paulová / Paul	191.132	191.132
10	(Norway) Ramsfjell / Ramsfjell	166.440	166.440
11	(Germany) Schöll / Harsch	134.802	134.802
12	(United States) Persinger / Plys	132.654	132.654
13	(Estonia) Kaldvee / Lill	128.086	128.086
14	(Australia) Gill / Hewitt	122.740	122.740
15	(Hungary) Palancsa / Kiss	117.920	117.920

== Notes ==
Preceded by 2020–21	2021–22 curling season June 2021 – May 2022	Succeeded by 2022–23
