= Russian Mixed Curling Championship =

- Established: 2006
- 2024 host city: Irkutsk
- 2024 arena: Baikal Ice Palace
- 2024 champion: Moscow Oblast 1 (Alexander Eremin)

The Russian Mixed Curling Championship (Russian: Чемпионат России по кёрлингу среди смешанных команд) is the national championship of mixed curling (two men and two women) in Russia. It has been held annually since 2006, organized by Russian Curling Federation.

== List of champions and medallists ==
(teams line-up in order: skip/fourth, third, second, lead, alternate, coach)

Year	Host city	Champion	Runner-up	Bronze
2006	Moscow	Team Moscow	SKA-1 (Saint Petersburg)	SKA-2 (Saint Petersburg)
2007	Moscow	EShVSM Moskvich-2 (Moscow); Alexander Kirikov (skip), ?, ?, ?	Moscow Oblast; Tatiana Smirnova (skip), ?, ?, ?	SKA-2 (Saint Petersburg); Stanislav Semyonov (skip), ?, ?, ?
2008	Moscow	EShVSM Moskvich-1 (Moscow); Alexander Kirikov (skip), Daria Kozlova, Alexey Kamnev, Julia Svetova, alternates: Denis Kilba, Alexandra Saitova	Team Moscow; Artyom Bolduzev (skip), Ekaterina Galkina, Alexey Stukalskiy, Ekaterina Antonova, alternates: Vadim Raev, Olga Zyablikova	Moskvich-2 (Moscow); Margarita Fomina (skip), Aleksandr Kozyrev, Maria Gorbokonj, Dmitry Abanin, alternate: Anna Lobova; Moskvich-1 (Moscow); Andrey Drozdov (skip), Anna Sidorova, Roman Kutuzov, Galina Arsenkina, alternate: Victoria Makarshina
2009	Dmitrov	EShVSM Moskvich-1 (Moscow); Alexander Kirikov (skip), Margarita Fomina, Roman Kutuzov, Ekaterina Galkina	Team Moscow; Anna Sidorova (skip), Victor Kornev, Alexandra Saitova, Vladimir Sobakin	Moscow; Olga Jarkova (skip), Alexey Stukalskiy, Anna Antonyuk, Anton Kalalb
2010	Dmitrov	EShVSM Moskvich-1 (Moscow); Alexander Kirikov (skip), Olga Jarkova, Vadim Shkolnikov, Olga Zyablikova, alternate: Anna Lobova	Moskvich-1 (Moscow); Artyom Bolduzev (skip), Margarita Fomina, Anton Kalalb, Victoria Makarshina	Adamant-1 (Saint Petersburg); Artur Razhabov (skip), Oksana Gertova, Petr Dron, Olesya Glushchenko
2011	Dmitrov	Moscow; Artyom Bolduzev (skip), Margarita Fomina, Anton Kalalb, Olga Zyablikova	Adamant-1 (Saint Petersburg); Alexey Tselousov (skip), Alina Kovaleva, Alexey Kamnev, Julia Zadorozhnaya	EShVSM Moskvich-1 (Moscow); Liudmila Privivkova (skip), Vadim Shkolnikov, Nkeirouka Ezekh, Vladimir Sobakin
2012	Dmitrov	SDYuSShOR Moskvich-2 (Moscow); Roman Kutuzov (skip), Nkeirouka Ezekh, Vadim Raev, Ekaterina Galkina, alternates: Sergey Manulychev, Tatiana Makeeva	Moscow-1; Margarita Fomina (skip), Alexey Stukalskiy, Alexandra Saitova, Anton Kalalb, alternates: Vladimir Sobakin, Tatiana Makeeva	Moscow Oblast-1 (Dmitrov); Mikhail Vaskov (skip), Anastasia Moskaleva, Alexander Korshunov, Marina Verenich
2013	Dmitrov	Saint Petersburg 1 Anders Kraupp (skip), Victoria Moiseeva, Alexander Orlov, Maria Duyunova, alternate: Vladislav Goncharenko	Moscow 1 Roman Kutuzov (skip), Alexandra Saitova, Vadim Raev, Valeria Shelkova	Moscow Oblast 1 (Dmitrov); Mikhail Vaskov (skip), Anastasia Moskaleva, Alexander Korshunov, Marina Verenich
2014	Dmitrov	Team Saint Petersburg 1 Alexey Tselousov (skip), Alina Kovaleva, Alexey Timofeev, Elena Efimova	UOR №2 (Saint Petersburg); Panteleimon Lappo (skip), Anastasia Bryzgalova, Ivan Alexandrov, Maria Rustamova, alternate: Semyon Osipov	Moscow Oblast 2 (Dmitrov); Vasily Telezhkin (skip), Daria Morozova, Alexey Kulikov, Marina Vdovina, alternate: Alexey Tuzov
2015	Sochi	Saint Petersburg 1 Alina Kovaleva, Alexey Tselousov (skip), Uliana Vasilyeva, Evgeny Klimov	Saint Petersburg 2 Alexander Krushelnitskiy (skip), Maria Duyunova, Daniil Goriachev, Yana Garshina	Team Moscow; Alexander Kirikov (skip), Victoria Makarshina, Vadim Shkolnikov, Elizaveta Lebedeva
2016	Dmitrov	Team Saint Petersburg 2 Alexander Krushelnitskiy (skip), Anastasia Bryzgalova, Daniil Goriachev, Maria Duyunova	Krasnodar Krai (Sochi); Olga Jarkova (skip), Roman Kutuzov, Galina Arsenkina, Aleksandr Kozyrev	Team Saint Petersburg 1 Alina Kovaleva (skip), ?, ?, ?, ?
2017	Sochi	Saint Petersburg 1 Alexander Krushelnitskiy (skip), Anastasia Bryzgalova, Daniil Goriachev, Maria Duyunova	Saint Petersburg 3 Andrey Drozdov (skip), Veronica Teplyashina, Petr Dron, Margarita Evdokimova	Krasnodar Krai 1 (Sochi); Olga Jarkova (skip), Sergey Glukhov, Yulia Portunova, Dmitry Mironov
2018	Novosibirsk	Novosibirsk Oblast 1 (Novosibirsk); Artem Shmakov (skip), Ekaterina Kungurova, Nikita Kukunin, Aleksandra Stoyarosova	Moscow Oblast 1 (Dmitrov); Alexander Eremin (skip), Daria Morozova, Alexey Tuzov, Irina Ryazanova	Saint Petersburg 2 Alexey Stukalskiy (skip), Anastasiya Khalanskaya, Oleg Krasikov, Aida Afanasjeva
2019	Novosibirsk	Saint Petersburg 1 Alexey Stukalskiy (skip), Maria Ermeychuk, Oleg Krasikov, Anastasiya Khalanskaya	Moscow Oblast 1 (Dmitrov); Alexander Eremin (skip), Anastasia Moskaleva, Alexey Tuzov, Daria Morozova	Saint Petersburg 3 Artur Razhabov (skip), Maria Drozdova, Panteleimon Lappo, Margarita Evdokimova
2020	Dmitrov	Saint Petersburg 3 Alexey Timofeev (skip), Irina Nizovtseva, Evgeny Klimov, Nadezhda Belyakova	Moscow Oblast 1 (Dmitrov); Alexander Eremin (skip), Anastasia Moskaleva, Alexey Tuzov, Daria Morozova	Novosibirsk Oblast; Artem Shmakov, Aleksandra Stoyarosova, Ivan Kazachkov, Ekaterina Kungurova
2021	Novosibirsk	ShVSM on ZVS (Saint Petersburg); Konstantin Manasevich, Anastasia Babarykina, Alexander Orlov (skip), Anastasia Belikova	Moscow Oblast 1 (Dmitrov); Mikhail Vaskov (skip), Olga Kotelnikova, Alexey Tuzov, Daria Morozova	Saint Petersburg 2 Alexey Stukalskiy (skip), Nkeirouka Ezekh, Oleg Krasikov, Anastasiya Khalanskaya
2022	Novosibirsk	Moscow Oblast 1 (Dmitrov); Mikhail Vaskov (skip), Anastasia Moskaleva, Alexander Eremin, Daria Morozova	Saint Petersburg 2 Alexey Stukalskiy (skip), Nkeirouka Ezekh, Oleg Krasikov, Diana Margaryan	Saint Petersburg 1 Alexander Krushelnitskiy (skip), Anastasia Babarykina, Daniil Goriachev, Anastasia Belyakova
2023	Irkutsk	Moscow Oblast 1 (Dmitrov); Mikhail Vaskov (skip), Daria Morozova, Alexander Eremin, Anastasia Moskaleva	Komsomoll 1 (Irkutsk Oblast); Nikolay Lysakov (skip), Elizaveta Trukhina, Mikhail Vlasenko, Nina Polikarpova	Novosibirsk Oblast 2 Konstantin Kozich (skip), Victoria Sackkova, Daniil Zazulskikh, Arina Kiel
2024	Irkutsk	Moscow Oblast 1 (Dmitrov); Anastasia Mischenko, Alexander Eremin (skip), Irina Ryazanova, Mikhail Vaskov	Team Moscow; Timofey Nasonov (skip), Maria Tsebriy, Grigory Lavrov, Daria Tskhvedanashvili	Krasnoyarsk Territory; Valentin Andreev, Anna Samoylik (skip), Vladimir Morozov, Anastasia Kosogor

== All time medals ==
One common table for men and women players in any position. As of the conclusion of the 2024 Russian Mixed Curling Championship (without players from 2006 and only skips for 2007 and bronze team of 2016).

Curler	M/F	Gold	Silver	Bronze	Total
Alexander Kirikov	M	4	0	1	5
Alexander Eremin	M	3	3	0	6
Mikhail Vaskov	M	3	1	2	6
Maria Duyunova	F	3	1	0	4
Daria Morozova	F	2	4	1	7
Anastasia Moskaleva	F	2	2	2	6
Margarita Fomina	F	2	2	1	5
Roman Kutuzov	M	2	2	1	5
Daniil Goriachev	M	2	1	1	4
Alina Kovaleva	F	2	1	1	4
Alexander Krushelnitskiy	M	2	1	1	4
Anastasia Bryzgalova	F	2	1	0	3
Ekaterina Galkina	F	2	1	0	3
Alexey Tselousov	M	2	1	0	3
Olga Zyablikova	F	2	1	0	3
Evgeny Klimov	M	2	0	0	2
Alexander Orlov	M	2	0	0	2
Alexey Timofeev	M	2	0	0	2
Alexey Stukalskiy	M	1	3	3	7
Alexandra Raeva (Saitova)	F	1	3	0	4
Anton Kalalb	M	1	2	1	4
Artyom Bolduzev	M	1	2	0	3
Vadim Raev	M	1	2	0	3
Nkeirouka Ezekh	F	1	1	2	4
Olga Jarkova	F	1	1	2	4
Oleg Krasikov	M	1	1	2	4
Alexey Kamnev	M	1	1	0	2
Tatiana Makeeva	F	1	1	0	2
Anastasiya Khalanskaya	F	1	0	2	3
Vadim Shkolnikov	M	1	0	2	3
Anastasia Babarykina	F	1	0	1	2
Ekaterina Kungurova	F	1	0	1	2
Anna Lobova	F	1	0	1	2
Irina Ryazanova	F	1	0	1	2
Artem Shmakov	M	1	0	1	2
Aleksandra Stoyarosova	F	1	0	1	2
Anastasia Belikova	F	1	0	0	1
Nadezhda Belyakova	F	1	0	0	1
Elena Efimova	F	1	0	0	1
Maria Ermeychuk	F	1	0	0	1
Vladislav Goncharenko	M	1	0	0	1
Denis Kilba	M	1	0	0	1
Daria Kozlova	F	1	0	0	1
Anders Kraupp	M	1	0	0	1
Nikita Kukunin	M	1	0	0	1
Konstantin Manasevich	M	1	0	0	1
Sergey Manulychev	M	1	0	0	1
Anastasia Mischenko	F	1	0	0	1
Victoria Moiseeva	F	1	0	0	1
Irina Nizovtseva	F	1	0	0	1
Julia Svetova	F	1	0	0	1
Uliana Vasilyeva	F	1	0	0	1
Alexey Tuzov	M	0	4	1	5
Vladimir Sobakin	M	0	2	1	3
Victoria Makarshina	F	0	1	2	3
Galina Arsenkina	F	0	1	1	2
Petr Dron	M	0	1	1	2
Andrey Drozdov	M	0	1	1	2
Margarita Evdokimova	F	0	1	1	2
Aleksandr Kozyrev	M	0	1	1	2
Panteleimon Lappo	M	0	1	1	2
Anna Sidorova	F	0	1	1	2
Ivan Alexandrov	M	0	1	0	1
Ekaterina Antonova	F	0	1	0	1
Yana Garshina	F	0	1	0	1
Olga Kotelnikova	F	0	1	0	1
Grigory Lavrov	M	0	1	0	1
Nikolay Lysakov	M	0	1	0	1
Diana Margaryan	F	0	1	0	1
Timofey Nasonov	M	0	1	0	1
Semyon Osipov	M	0	1	0	1
Nina Polikarpova	F	0	1	0	1
Maria Rustamova	M	0	1	0	1
Valeria Shelkova	F	0	1	0	1
Tatiana Smirnova	F	0	1	0	1
Veronica Teplyashina	F	0	1	0	1
Elizaveta Trukhina	F	0	1	0	1
Maria Tsebriy	F	0	1	0	1
Daria Tskhvedanashvili	F	0	1	0	1
Mikhail Vlasenko	M	0	1	0	1
Julia Zadorozhnaya	F	0	1	0	1
Alexander Korshunov	M	0	0	2	2
Artur Razhabov	M	0	0	2	2
Marina Verenich	F	0	0	2	2
Dmitry Abanin	M	0	0	1	1
Aida Afanasjeva	F	0	0	1	1
Valentin Andreeev	M	0	0	1	1
Anastasia Belyakova	F	0	0	1	1
Maria Drozdova	F	0	0	1	1
Oksana Gertova	F	0	0	1	1
Sergey Glukhov	M	0	0	1	1
Olesya Glushchenko	F	0	0	1	1
Maria Gorbokonj	F	0	0	1	1
Ivan Kazachkov	M	0	0	1	1
Arina Kiel	F	0	0	1	1
Anastasia Kosogor	F	0	0	1	1
Konstantin Kozich	M	0	0	1	1
Alexey Kulikov	M	0	0	1	1
Elizaveta Lebedeva	F	0	0	1	1
Dmitry Mironov	M	0	0	1	1
Vladimir Morozov	M	0	0	1	1
Yulia Portunova	F	0	0	1	1
Liudmila Privivkova	F	0	0	1	1
Victoria Sackkova	F	0	0	1	1
Anna Samoylik	F	0	0	1	1
Stanislav Semyonov	M	0	0	1	1
Vasily Telezhkin	M	0	0	1	1
Marina Vdovina	F	0	0	1	1
Daniil Zazulskikh	M	0	0	1	1

== See also ==
- Russian Men's Curling Championship
- Russian Women's Curling Championship
- Russian Mixed Doubles Curling Championship
- Russian Junior Curling Championships
- Russian Senior Curling Championships
- Russian Wheelchair Curling Championship
- Russian Wheelchair Mixed Doubles Curling Championship
- Russian Mixed Curling Cup
