= Red Square Classic =

World Curling Tour event

The Red Square Classic and the Moscow Classic are annual bonspiels (curling tournaments) on the men's World Curling Tour (WCT). The Red Square Classic is played outdoors at Red Square, while the Moscow Classic is played at the New League curling club in Moscow, Russia. Both events are held in early February within a week of each other.

The Red Square Classic ran as a solo event from 2014 to 2017. It was replaced by the Moscow Classic in 2018. In 2019, the event returned to Red Square, and in 2020 both events were held for the first time. In 2021, the events were cancelled and replaced by a mixed doubles event.

== Past champions ==
Year	Winning team	Runner up team
2014	Alexey Tselousov, Artem Shmakov, Alexey Timofeev, Evgeny Klimov	(Canada) Brad Gushue, Geoff Walker, Brett Gallant, Adam Casey
2015	Alexander Krushelnitsky, Daniil Goriachev, Vladislav Goncherenko, Ilya Badilin	(United States) Craig Brown, Kroy Nernberger, Sean Beighton, Jared Zezel
2016	Aleksandr Kirikov	(Switzerland) Sven Michel, Marc Pfister, Enrico Pfister, Simon Gempeler
2017	(Switzerland) Marc Pfister, Enrico Pfister, Raphael Märki, Simon Gempeler	Alexander Orlov, Alexander Boyko, Valdislav Goncharenko, Viktor Vorobyev
2018	(Netherlands) Jaap van Dorp, Wouter Gosgens, Laurens Hoekman, Carlo Glasbergen	(Czech Republic) Lukáš Klíma, Jiri Candra, Marek Cernovsky, Jakub Bareš
2019	Sergey Glukhov, Artur Ali, Dmitry Mironov, Anton Kalalb	Alexey Timofeev, Alexey Stukalskiy, Artur Razhabov, Evgeny Klimov
2020 (MC)	(Italy) Joël Retornaz, Amos Mosaner, Sebastiano Arman, Simone Gonin	(Germany) Sixten Totzek, Joshua Sutor, Jan-Lucia Haag, Magnus Sutor
2020 (RS)	Aleksandr Kirikov, Vadim Shkolnikov, Dmitri Abanin, Sergey Morozov	Alexey Timofeev, Sergey Varlamov, Oleg Krasikov, Danil Kiba
2021	Cancelled	
2022	Alexei Stukalskiy, Oleg Krasikov, Gleb Lianikov, Danil Kiba	Alexey Timofeev, Artur Ali, Alexei Tuzov, Artur Razhabov

== Mixed doubles ==
Moscow first held a mixed doubles tour event in December 2019 called the ISS WCT Moscow Mixed Doubles.

Year	Winning pair	Runner up pair	Third place	Fourth place
2019	(Moscow) Anastasia Moskaleva / Alexander Eremin	(Krasnoyarsk Krai) Kristina Dudko / Vladislav Velichko	(Moscow Oblast) Daria Morozova / (Saint Petersburg) Daniil Goriachev	(Belarus) Arina Sverzhinskaya / (Yaroslavl Oblast) Vasily Telezhkin
2021	(Krasnoyarsk Krai) Anna Samoylik / (Moscow Oblast) Mikhail Vaskov	(Italy) Marta Lo Deserto / (Krasnodar Krai) Sergey Glukhov	(Italy) Diana Gaspari / Joel Retornaz	(Novosibirsk Oblast) Alexandra Stoyarosova / Ivan Kazachkov
