= 2021 Russian Olympic mixed doubles curling trials =

2021 Russian mixed doubles curling Olympic trials
- Host city: Kislovodsk, Russia
- Arena: Yug Sport Complex
- Dates: September 21–25 (Leg 1); October 16–20 (Leg 2)
- Winner: (Moscow) Sidorova / Timofeev
- Female: Anna Sidorova
- Male: Alexey Timofeev
- Finalist: (Moscow) Moskaleva / Eremin

The 2021 Russian mixed doubles curling Olympic trials were held from September 21 to 25 and October 16 to 20 at the Yug Sport Complex in Kislovodsk, Russia. The winning pair of Anna Sidorova and Alexey Timofeev earned the right to represent the Russian Olympic Committee at the Olympic Qualification Event. There, they went 4–2 through the round robin, qualifying for the playoffs. After defeating Hungary in the semifinals, they were beaten by the United States in the qualification final, not advancing to the 2022 Winter Olympics in Beijing, China.

The trials process was contested between six teams. It was held in two legs where a double round robin format was played in each. In the second leg, only eight of the ten draws needed to be played before Anna Sidorova and Alexey Timofeev were declared the winners. Had another team won the second leg, a best-of-three series would've been held between the winners of the first and second legs to determine the champion. The other five pairs included Nkeirouka Ezekh and Alexey Stukalskiy, Maria Komarova and Daniil Goriachev, Daria Morozova and Oleg Krasikov, Anastasia Moskaleva and Alexander Eremin and Anna Samoylik and Mikhail Vaskov.

== Teams ==
The teams are listed as follows:

Female	Male	Locale
Nkeirouka Ezekh	Alexey Stukalskiy	Moscow
Maria Komarova	Daniil Goriachev	Moscow
Daria Morozova	Oleg Krasikov	Moscow
Anastasia Moskaleva	Alexander Eremin	Moscow
Anna Samoylik	Mikhail Vaskov	Krasnoyarsk
Anna Sidorova	Alexey Timofeev	Moscow

== Leg 1 ==
=== Round-robin standings ===
Final round-robin standings

Key
Leg 1 Winners

Team	W	L	W–L	DSC
(Moscow) Sidorova / Timofeev	8	2	–	24.33
(Moscow) Moskaleva / Eremin	5	5	4–0	42.82
(Krasnoyarsk) Samoylik / Vaskov	5	5	1–3; 1–1	33.76
(Moscow) Morozova / Krasikov	5	5	1–3; 1–1	38.64
(Moscow) Komarova / Goriachev	4	6	–	53.11
(Moscow) Ezekh / Stukalskiy	3	7	–	44.36

=== Round-robin results ===
All draw times are listed in Moscow Time (UTC+03:00).

==== Draw 1 ====
Tuesday, September 21, 12:30

Sheet B	1	2	3	4	5	6	7	8	9	Final
(Moscow) Moskaleva / Eremin 🔨	2	0	2	0	0	1	0	1	0	6
(Moscow) Ezekh / Stukalskiy	0	1	0	1	2	0	2	0	1	7

Sheet C	1	2	3	4	5	6	7	8	Final
(Krasnoyarsk) Samoylik / Vaskov	1	0	1	3	1	0	0	1	7
(Moscow) Sidorova / Timofeev 🔨	0	1	0	0	0	4	1	0	6

Sheet D	1	2	3	4	5	6	7	8	Final
(Moscow) Morozova / Krasikov 🔨	1	0	0	2	2	1	0	0	6
(Moscow) Komarova / Goriachev	0	4	1	0	0	0	1	1	7

==== Draw 2 ====
Tuesday, September 21, 18:00

Sheet B	1	2	3	4	5	6	7	8	Final
(Moscow) Komarova / Goriachev 🔨	0	0	2	0	2	0	1	X	5
(Moscow) Sidorova / Timofeev	4	1	0	1	0	1	0	X	7

Sheet C	1	2	3	4	5	6	7	8	Final
(Moscow) Moskaleva / Eremin	0	2	0	1	0	3	1	1	8
(Moscow) Morozova / Krasikov 🔨	1	0	1	0	4	0	0	0	6

Sheet D	1	2	3	4	5	6	7	8	Final
(Krasnoyarsk) Samoylik / Vaskov 🔨	0	1	0	4	0	0	0	1	6
(Moscow) Ezekh / Stukalskiy	1	0	1	0	1	1	1	0	5

==== Draw 3 ====
Wednesday, September 22, 12:30

Sheet B	1	2	3	4	5	6	7	8	9	Final
(Krasnoyarsk) Samoylik / Vaskov 🔨	1	0	1	0	1	0	2	1	0	6
(Moscow) Moskaleva / Eremin	0	3	0	1	0	2	0	0	1	7

Sheet C	1	2	3	4	5	6	7	8	Final
(Moscow) Ezekh / Stukalskiy 🔨	1	0	2	0	0	1	1	2	7
(Moscow) Komarova / Goriachev	0	2	0	3	1	0	0	0	6

Sheet D	1	2	3	4	5	6	7	8	Final
(Moscow) Sidorova / Timofeev 🔨	1	2	0	1	3	0	1	0	8
(Moscow) Morozova / Krasikov	0	0	2	0	0	2	0	2	6

==== Draw 4 ====
Wednesday, September 22, 18:00

Sheet B	1	2	3	4	5	6	7	8	Final
(Moscow) Ezekh / Stukalskiy 🔨	0	0	1	0	1	0	3	0	5
(Moscow) Morozova / Krasikov	1	1	0	1	0	1	0	2	6

Sheet C	1	2	3	4	5	6	7	8	Final
(Moscow) Sidorova / Timofeev 🔨	1	2	0	2	0	2	0	0	7
(Moscow) Moskaleva / Eremin	0	0	1	0	3	0	1	1	6

Sheet D	1	2	3	4	5	6	7	8	Final
(Moscow) Komarova / Goriachev	0	1	0	1	1	0	3	0	6
(Krasnoyarsk) Samoylik / Vaskov 🔨	3	0	1	0	0	1	0	2	7

==== Draw 5 ====
Thursday, September 23, 12:30

Sheet B	1	2	3	4	5	6	7	8	Final
(Moscow) Moskaleva / Eremin 🔨	0	1	0	1	0	0	1	0	3
(Moscow) Komarova / Goriachev	1	0	1	0	1	1	0	1	5

Sheet C	1	2	3	4	5	6	7	8	Final
(Moscow) Morozova / Krasikov 🔨	3	0	1	2	0	3	0	X	9
(Krasnoyarsk) Samoylik / Vaskov	0	2	0	0	2	0	1	X	5

Sheet D	1	2	3	4	5	6	7	8	9	Final
(Moscow) Ezekh / Stukalskiy 🔨	1	0	1	0	1	0	2	1	0	6
(Moscow) Sidorova / Timofeev	0	3	0	1	0	2	0	0	1	7

==== Draw 6 ====
Thursday, September 23, 18:00

Sheet B	1	2	3	4	5	6	7	8	Final
(Moscow) Sidorova / Timofeev 🔨	1	3	2	0	4	0	X	X	10
(Moscow) Ezekh / Stukalskiy	0	0	0	1	0	2	X	X	3

Sheet C	1	2	3	4	5	6	7	8	Final
(Moscow) Komarova / Goriachev 🔨	1	0	3	0	0	0	2	1	7
(Moscow) Moskaleva / Eremin	0	2	0	1	1	1	0	0	5

Sheet D	1	2	3	4	5	6	7	8	Final
(Krasnoyarsk) Samoylik / Vaskov 🔨	1	0	2	0	1	0	2	X	6
(Moscow) Morozova / Krasikov	0	1	0	1	0	1	0	X	3

==== Draw 7 ====
Friday, September 24, 12:30

Sheet B	1	2	3	4	5	6	7	8	Final
(Krasnoyarsk) Samoylik / Vaskov 🔨	2	0	3	0	2	X	X	X	7
(Moscow) Komarova / Goriachev	0	1	0	1	0	X	X	X	2

Sheet C	1	2	3	4	5	6	7	8	Final
(Moscow) Morozova / Krasikov 🔨	0	4	0	1	0	1	0	1	7
(Moscow) Ezekh / Stukalskiy	1	0	1	0	2	0	1	0	5

Sheet D	1	2	3	4	5	6	7	8	Final
(Moscow) Moskaleva / Eremin 🔨	1	0	1	0	2	0	0	1	5
(Moscow) Sidorova / Timofeev	0	1	0	3	0	1	1	0	6

==== Draw 8 ====
Friday, September 24, 18:00

Sheet B	1	2	3	4	5	6	7	8	Final
(Moscow) Morozova / Krasikov	1	0	1	0	1	0	1	2	6
(Moscow) Sidorova / Timofeev 🔨	0	1	0	2	0	1	0	0	4

Sheet C	1	2	3	4	5	6	7	8	Final
(Moscow) Moskaleva / Eremin	2	1	1	0	2	1	0	1	8
(Krasnoyarsk) Samoylik / Vaskov 🔨	0	0	0	3	0	0	2	0	5

Sheet D	1	2	3	4	5	6	7	8	9	Final
(Moscow) Komarova / Goriachev 🔨	0	1	0	1	0	1	1	0	1	5
(Moscow) Ezekh / Stukalskiy	1	0	1	0	1	0	0	1	0	4

==== Draw 9 ====
Saturday, September 25, 12:30

Sheet B	1	2	3	4	5	6	7	8	Final
(Moscow) Ezekh / Stukalskiy 🔨	1	0	2	0	0	1	0	2	6
(Krasnoyarsk) Samoylik / Vaskov	0	1	0	1	2	0	1	0	5

Sheet C	1	2	3	4	5	6	7	8	Final
(Moscow) Sidorova / Timofeev 🔨	4	0	3	0	X	X	X	X	7
(Moscow) Komarova / Goriachev	0	1	0	0	X	X	X	X	1

Sheet D	1	2	3	4	5	6	7	8	Final
(Moscow) Morozova / Krasikov 🔨	1	0	0	2	0	1	2	0	6
(Moscow) Moskaleva / Eremin	0	1	3	0	1	0	0	2	7

==== Draw 10 ====
Saturday, September 25, 18:00

Sheet B	1	2	3	4	5	6	7	8	9	Final
(Moscow) Komarova / Goriachev	0	2	0	4	0	3	0	1	0	10
(Moscow) Morozova / Krasikov 🔨	1	0	2	0	2	0	5	0	1	11

Sheet C	1	2	3	4	5	6	7	8	9	Final
(Moscow) Ezekh / Stukalskiy	0	2	0	1	0	1	0	2	0	6
(Moscow) Moskaleva / Eremin 🔨	1	0	2	0	1	0	2	0	1	7

Sheet D	1	2	3	4	5	6	7	8	Final
(Moscow) Sidorova / Timofeev 🔨	3	0	1	0	1	1	2	X	8
(Krasnoyarsk) Samoylik / Vaskov	0	0	0	2	0	0	0	X	2

== Leg 2 ==
=== Round-robin standings ===
After Draw 8

Key
Leg 2 Winners

Team	W	L	W–L
(Moscow) Sidorova / Timofeev	7	1	–
(Moscow) Moskaleva / Eremin	5	3	–
(Moscow) Komarova / Goriachev	4	4	1–0
(Moscow) Morozova / Krasikov	4	4	0–1
(Moscow) Ezekh / Stukalskiy	3	5	–
(Krasnoyarsk) Samoylik / Vaskov	1	7	–

=== Round-robin results ===
All draw times are listed in Moscow Time (UTC+03:00).

==== Draw 1 ====
Saturday, October 16, 11:30

Sheet B	1	2	3	4	5	6	7	8	Final
(Moscow) Moskaleva / Eremin	0	3	0	2	0	3	0	X	8
(Moscow) Ezekh / Stukalskiy 🔨	1	0	2	0	1	0	2	X	6

Sheet C	1	2	3	4	5	6	7	8	Final
(Krasnoyarsk) Samoylik / Vaskov	0	4	1	0	1	0	1	0	7
(Moscow) Sidorova / Timofeev 🔨	2	0	0	1	0	1	0	2	6

Sheet D	1	2	3	4	5	6	7	8	Final
(Moscow) Morozova / Krasikov 🔨	0	3	0	1	0	0	1	X	5
(Moscow) Komarova / Goriachev	1	0	3	0	1	3	0	X	8

==== Draw 2 ====
Saturday, October 16, 17:00

Sheet B	1	2	3	4	5	6	7	8	Final
(Moscow) Komarova / Goriachev 🔨	0	1	0	2	0	0	2	0	5
(Moscow) Sidorova / Timofeev	1	0	1	0	1	2	0	2	7

Sheet C	1	2	3	4	5	6	7	8	Final
(Moscow) Moskaleva / Eremin	0	0	1	1	0	1	1	0	4
(Moscow) Morozova / Krasikov 🔨	1	1	0	0	2	0	0	1	5

Sheet D	1	2	3	4	5	6	7	8	Final
(Krasnoyarsk) Samoylik / Vaskov	0	2	0	0	0	2	1	0	5
(Moscow) Ezekh / Stukalskiy 🔨	2	0	1	0	2	0	0	2	7

==== Draw 3 ====
Sunday, October 17, 11:30

Sheet B	1	2	3	4	5	6	7	8	Final
(Krasnoyarsk) Samoylik / Vaskov	0	0	1	0	2	0	0	X	3
(Moscow) Moskaleva / Eremin 🔨	2	1	0	2	0	1	1	X	7

Sheet C	1	2	3	4	5	6	7	8	Final
(Moscow) Ezekh / Stukalskiy 🔨	0	1	1	0	1	0	1	1	5
(Moscow) Komarova / Goriachev	1	0	0	1	0	2	0	0	4

Sheet D	1	2	3	4	5	6	7	8	Final
(Moscow) Sidorova / Timofeev	0	3	0	1	2	0	0	2	8
(Moscow) Morozova / Krasikov 🔨	1	0	2	0	0	2	1	0	6

==== Draw 4 ====
Sunday, October 17, 17:00

Sheet B	1	2	3	4	5	6	7	8	Final
(Moscow) Ezekh / Stukalskiy	0	3	1	0	2	0	0	1	7
(Moscow) Morozova / Krasikov 🔨	1	0	0	1	0	2	2	0	6

Sheet C	1	2	3	4	5	6	7	8	9	Final
(Moscow) Sidorova / Timofeev	0	1	2	1	1	0	0	2	1	8
(Moscow) Moskaleva / Eremin 🔨	2	0	0	0	0	4	1	0	0	7

Sheet D	1	2	3	4	5	6	7	8	Final
(Moscow) Komarova / Goriachev	2	0	1	0	1	0	3	X	7
(Krasnoyarsk) Samoylik / Vaskov 🔨	0	1	0	1	0	2	0	X	4

==== Draw 5 ====
Monday, October 18, 11:30

Sheet B	1	2	3	4	5	6	7	8	Final
(Moscow) Moskaleva / Eremin	1	0	2	0	3	0	0	2	8
(Moscow) Komarova / Goriachev 🔨	0	2	0	3	0	1	1	0	7

Sheet C	1	2	3	4	5	6	7	8	Final
(Moscow) Morozova / Krasikov 🔨	1	2	0	0	1	0	5	X	9
(Krasnoyarsk) Samoylik / Vaskov	0	0	1	1	0	3	0	X	5

Sheet D	1	2	3	4	5	6	7	8	Final
(Moscow) Ezekh / Stukalskiy 🔨	0	0	0	2	0	1	0	X	3
(Moscow) Sidorova / Timofeev	1	2	2	0	2	0	4	X	11

==== Draw 6 ====
Monday, October 18, 17:00

Sheet B	1	2	3	4	5	6	7	8	Final
(Moscow) Sidorova / Timofeev 🔨	0	2	0	1	1	1	2	X	7
(Moscow) Ezekh / Stukalskiy	1	0	1	0	0	0	0	X	2

Sheet C	1	2	3	4	5	6	7	8	Final
(Moscow) Komarova / Goriachev	0	1	0	2	0	2	1	0	6
(Moscow) Moskaleva / Eremin 🔨	1	0	2	0	4	0	0	2	9

Sheet D	1	2	3	4	5	6	7	8	Final
(Krasnoyarsk) Samoylik / Vaskov	0	2	0	0	0	0	0	X	2
(Moscow) Morozova / Krasikov 🔨	1	0	1	1	1	1	1	X	6

==== Draw 7 ====
Tuesday, October 19, 11:30

Sheet B	1	2	3	4	5	6	7	8	Final
(Krasnoyarsk) Samoylik / Vaskov 🔨	1	0	0	0	1	0	1	X	3
(Moscow) Komarova / Goriachev	0	2	1	1	0	2	0	X	6

Sheet C	1	2	3	4	5	6	7	8	Final
(Moscow) Morozova / Krasikov	2	1	1	0	1	1	1	X	7
(Moscow) Ezekh / Stukalskiy 🔨	0	0	0	2	0	0	0	X	2

Sheet D	1	2	3	4	5	6	7	8	Final
(Moscow) Moskaleva / Eremin 🔨	1	0	0	0	1	0	0	X	2
(Moscow) Sidorova / Timofeev	0	1	2	1	0	1	1	X	6

==== Draw 8 ====
Tuesday, October 19, 17:00

Sheet B	1	2	3	4	5	6	7	8	Final
(Moscow) Morozova / Krasikov	0	1	0	0	0	3	0	X	4
(Moscow) Sidorova / Timofeev 🔨	1	0	1	2	3	0	2	X	9

Sheet C	1	2	3	4	5	6	7	8	Final
(Moscow) Moskaleva / Eremin 🔨	3	1	2	1	0	0	3	X	10
(Krasnoyarsk) Samoylik / Vaskov	0	0	0	0	1	2	0	X	3

Sheet D	1	2	3	4	5	6	7	8	9	Final
(Moscow) Komarova / Goriachev	0	3	0	1	1	0	3	0	1	9
(Moscow) Ezekh / Stukalskiy 🔨	2	0	2	0	0	1	0	3	0	8

== Final standings ==
Place	Team	L1 W	L2 W	Tot
1st place, gold medalist(s)	(Moscow) Anna Sidorova / Alexey Timofeev	8	7	15
2nd place, silver medalist(s)	(Moscow) Anastasia Moskaleva / Alexander Eremin	5	5	10
3rd place, bronze medalist(s)	(Moscow) Daria Morozova / Oleg Krasikov	5	4	9
4	(Moscow) Maria Komarova / Daniil Goriachev	4	4	8
5	(Moscow) Nkeirouka Ezekh / Alexey Stukalskiy	3	3	6
6	(Krasnoyarsk) Anna Samoylik / Mikhail Vaskov	5	1	6
