= Sirius Cup =

World Curling Tour event

The Sirus Cup, formerly International Mixed Doubles Sochi is an annual mixed doubles curling tournament on the ISS Mixed Doubles World Curling Tour. It is held annually in late February/early March at the training centre of the Iceberg Skating Palace in Sochi, Russia. Prior to 2020, the event was held twice a year, with an event held in November as well.

The purse for the event is US$5,000. and its event categorization is 300 (highest calibre is 1000).

The event has been held since 2017.

== Past champions ==
Year	Winning pair	Runner up pair	Third place	Fourth place	Purse (US$)
2017	(Norway) Kristin Skaslien & Magnus Nedregotten	(Saint Petersburg) Anastasia Bryzgalova & Alexander Krushelnitskiy	(Saint Petersburg) Polina Bikker & Petr Dron	(Hungary) Ildikó Szekeres & György Nagy	CA$12,733
2018 (Mar.)	(Moscow) Anastasia Moskaleva & Alexander Eremin	(Moscow) Maria Komarova & Daniil Goriachev	(Moscow) Alina Biktimirova & Timur Gadzhikhanov	(Moscow Oblast) Daria Morozova & Petr Kuznetsov	$10,000
2018 (Nov.)	(Scotland) Gina Aitken & Scott Andrews	(Moscow) Maria Komarova & Daniil Goriachev	(England) Anna Fowler & Ben Fowler	(Moscow) Anastasia Moskaleva & Alexander Eremin	$10,000
2019 (Mar.)	(Irkutsk Oblast) Nina Polikarpova & Artem Karetnikov	(Moscow) Alina Biktimirova & Timur Gadzhikhanov	(Hungary) Ildikó Szekeres & György Nagy	(Krasnoyarsk Krai) Maria Ignatenko & Sergei Glukhov	$10,000
2019 (Nov.)	(Switzerland) Jenny Perret & Martin Rios	(Moscow) Margarita Fomina & Alexey Stukalskiy	(Hungary) Ildikó Szekeres & György Nagy	(Moscow) Ekaterina Telnova & Artem Puzanov	CA$13,317
2020	(Irkutsk Oblast) Elizaveta Trukhina & Nikolay Lysakov	(Moscow) Nkeirouka Ezekh & Sergei Glukhov	(Czech Republic) Zuzana Paulová & Tomáš Paul	(Irkutsk Oblast) Valeriia Denisenko & Kirill Palagney	$10,000
2021	(Moscow Oblast) Anastasia Moskaleva & Alexander Eremin	(Krasnoyarsk Krai) Anna Samoylik & (Moscow Oblast) Mikhail Vaskov	(Irkutsk Oblast) Elizaveta Trukhina & Nikolay Lysakov	(Saint Petersburg) Nkeirouka Ezekh & Alexey Stukalskiy	$5,000
