= Evgeny Arkhipov =

Russian curler

Evgeny Arkhipov Евгений Архипов
- Curler
- Born: 4 January 1992 (age 34); Moscow

Team
- Curling club: Moskvitch CC, Moscow, RUS
- Skip: Evgeny Arkhipov
- Third: Sergei Glukhov
- Second: Dmitry Mironov
- Lead: Anton Kalalb

Curling career
- World Championship: 2 (2014, 2015)
- European Championship: 3 (2013, 2014, 2015)
- Olympic: 1 (2014)
Medal record
Curling
Representing Russia
Winter Universiade
Silver medal – second place	2015 Granada
World Junior Championships
Silver medal – second place	2013 Sochi
European Junior Challenge
Silver medal – second place	2012 Copenhagen

Evgeny Valeryevich Arkhipov (Russian: Евгений Валерьевич Архипов; born 4 January 1992) is a Russian curler from Moscow. He currently skips the Russian national curling team and skips a different rink on the World Curling Tour.

Arkhipov played on the Russian national junior team from 2011 to 2013, skipping the team from 2012 to 2013. The team, which also consisted of Sergey Glukhov, Dmitry Mironov and Artur Ali qualified for the 2013 World Junior Curling Championships where they won a silver medal. The team had finished the round robin with a 7-2 record in third place, and managed to defeat Sweden's Patric Mabergs and Canada's Matthew Dunstone in the playoffs before losing to Scotland's Kyle Smith in the final.

In 2013, Arkhipov joined the national men's team. His first international tournament on the men's team was the 2013 European Curling Championships, where he threw fourth stones for the team. After finishing the round robin with a 4-4 record, the team finished 6th place. Arkhipov was moved to play third on the team for the 2014 Winter Olympics where the team finished 7th place and a 2-5 record.

Arkhipov has played in one Grand Slam event, the 2013 Masters of Curling as a member of the Russian men's team. Arkhipov threw fourth stones in the tournament, and the team went 0-4.

== Personal life ==
Arkhipov attended the Russian State University of Physical Education.
