= Kazakhstan Curling Cup WCT Mixed Doubles =

World Curling Tour event

- Host city: Almaty, Kazakhstan
- Purse: $ 8,000

The Kazakhstan Curling Cup WCT Mixed Doubles is an annual mixed doubles curling tournament on the ISS Mixed Doubles World Curling Tour. It is held in Almaty, Kazakhstan

The purse for the event is $8,000 (US).

It has been part of the World Curling Tour since 2022, and has been held twice since joining the tour, in May and July 2022.

The May 2022 event featured teams from across Central Asia; hosts Kazakhstan, India, Afghanistan, Kyrgyzstan, and Uzbekistan, as well as South Korea. An Indian curler, P. N. Raju was a member of the runner up pair, becoming the first Indian to earn a podium finish at a WCT event.

== Past champions ==
Year	Winning pair	Runner up pair	Semifinalists	Purse (USD)
2022 (May)	(Kazakhstan) Kristina Kolykhalova / Muzdybay Kudaibergenov	(Kazakhstan) Akgul Kumar / (India) P. N. Raju	(Kazakhstan) Tilsimay Alliyarova / (Uzbekistan) Ondasyn Artikbaev & (Kazakhstan) Yelizaveta Utochko / Dmitriy Garagul	$8,000
2022 (July)	(Kazakhstan) Angelina Ebauyer / Adil Zhumagozha	(Kazakhstan) Yelizaveta Utochko / Dmitriy Garagul	(Kazakhstan) Marey Tastemir / Aidos Alliyar & (Kazakhstan) Regina Ebauyer / Muzdybay Kudaibergenov	$8,000
