= Dmitry Mironov =

Russian curler (born 1992)

Dmitry Mironov Дми́трий Миро́нов
- Curler
- Born: 22 October 1992 (age 34); Chelyabinsk, Russia

Team
- Curling club: Ice Cube CC, Sochi, RUS
- Skip: Sergey Glukhov
- Third: Evgeny Klimov
- Second: Dmitry Mironov
- Lead: Anton Kalalb
- Alternate: Daniil Goriachev

Curling career
- Member Association: Russia
- World Championship: 2 (2019, 2021)
- European Championship: 1 (2021)
- Olympic: 1 (2022)
Medal record
Men's curling
Representing Russia
World Junior Championships
Silver medal – second place	2013 Sochi

Dmitry Andreyevich Mironov (Russian: Дми́трий Андре́евич Миро́нов; born 22 October 1992 in Chelyabinsk) is a Russian curler from Sochi.

As a junior curler, Mironov played second for Team Russia at two World Junior Curling Championships on teams skipped by Evgeny Arkhipov. At the 2013 World Junior Curling Championships, playing at home in Sochi, the team took home the silver medal. He again represented Russia at the 2014 World Junior Curling Championships, and the team placed 7th.

Mironov represented Russia at the men's level for the first time at the 2019 World Men's Curling Championship, playing second on the team, which was skipped by Sergey Glukhov. The team would finish the event in 9th place.

On the World Curling Tour, Mironov has won the 2018 China Open (as a skip) and the 2019 Red Square Classic, playing second.
