= Cincinnati Mixed Doubles Cup =

World Curling Tour event

The Cincinnati Mixed Doubles Cup is an annual mixed doubles curling tournament, that was part of the ISS Mixed Doubles World Curling Tour for its first two seasons. It is held annually at the Cincinnati Curling Club in West Chester, Ohio.

The purse for the event is $4,500, and its event categorization is 300 (highest calibre is 1000).

The event has been held since 2022.

== Past champions ==
Year	Winning pair	Runner up pair	Semifinalists	Purse ($US)
2022	(Colorado) Clare Moores / Lance Wheeler	(Pennsylvania) Harley Rohrbacher / Vincent Scebbi	(Ohio) Sarah Burns / Scott Piroth & (Colorado) Becca Wood / (New York (state)) Chris Bond	$2,000
2023 (Feb.)	(Ohio) Erin Dunphy / Ishan Sethi	(Missouri) Flannery Allison / Michael Allison	(Colorado) Joyce McLaren / (Ohio) Kevin Mechenbier & (Ohio) Emily Potter / Brian Shimko	$4,500
2023 (Dec.)	(Minnesota) Emily Schweitzer / Blake Hagberg	(Minnesota) Kelsey Ostrowski / DJ Johnson	(Colorado) Joyce McLaren / (Ohio) Kevin Mechenbier & (Ohio) Angie Jones / Nicholas Visnich	$5,000
2024	(Ontario) Laura Neil / Scott McDonald	(Pennsylvania) Cindy Bush / Joseph Philips	(Colorado) Kelly Danahey / Ben Allain & (Ohio) Julia DiBaggio / Nicholas Visnich	$6,400
2025	(Ontario) Laura Neil / Scott McDonald	(Ohio) Carley Scebbi / Vincent Scebbi	(Alabama) Molly Hackett / Alec Hackett & (Michigan) Ashley Mayra / Jimmy Kirby	$5,000
