= Stadler European Mixed Doubles Invitational =

The Stadler European Mixed Doubles Invitational is a mixed doubles curling tournament held in Switzerland. It is a World Curling team ranking event.

The purse for the event is €5,600.

== Past champions ==
Year	Winning pair	Runner up pair	Third place	Fourth place	Purse	Host
2021	(Switzerland) Daniela Rupp / Kevin Wunderlin	(Italy) Stefania Constantini / Amos Mosaner	(Switzerland) Jenny Perret / Martin Rios	(Hungary) Dorottya Palancsa / Zsolt Kiss	€5,600	Biel/Bienne
2023	(Norway) Maia Ramsfjell / Magnus Ramsfjell	(Switzerland) Jenny Perret / Martin Rios	(Norway) Kristin Moen Skaslien / Magnus Nedregotten	(Estonia) Marie Kaldvee / Harri Lill	€5,600	Biel/Bienne
2025	(Australia) Tahli Gill / Dean Hewitt	(Switzerland) Briar Schwaller / Yannick Schwaller	(Switzerland) Jenny Perret / Martin Rios	(Netherlands) Vanessa Tonoli / Laurens Hoekman	€5,600	Bern
