= Oleg Krasikov =

Russian curler (born 1999)

- Curler
- Born: 16 November 1999 (age 26)

Team
- Curling club: SK Adamant, Saint Petersburg
- Skip: Oleg Krasikov
- Third: Danil Kiba
- Second: Petr Dron
- Lead: Gleb Ljasnikov
- Alternate: Sergey Varlamov
- Mixed doubles partner: Olga Antonova

Oleg Vladimirovich Krasikov (Russian: Олег Владимирович Красиков; born 16 November 1999) is a Russian curler from Saint Petersburg. He has won the Russian mixed and mixed doubles curling championships.

== Teams ==
=== Men's ===
Season	Skip	Third	Second	Lead	Alternate	Events
2016–17	Alexey Stukalskiy	Andrey Drozdov	Petr Dron	Anton Kalalb	Oleg Krasikov	RMCC 2016 (bronze)
2016–17	Oleg Krasikov	?	?	?		
2016–17	Oleg Krasikov	Rudolf Zaharyan	Danil Kiba	Artem Vajhonskij	Sergey Nikitin	RMCC 2017 (14th)
2017–18	Rudolf Zaharyan	Oleg Krasikov	Danil Kiba	Artem Vajhonskij	Stepan Shuliko	
2017–18	Oleg Krasikov	?	?	?		
2017–18	Oleg Krasikov	Sergey Varlamov	Danil Kiba	Nikolay Cherednichenko	Ivan Alexandrov	RMCCup 2017 (6th)
2017–18	Oleg Krasikov	Danil Kiba	Sergey Varlamov	Nikolay Cherednichenko		RMCC 2018 (11th)
2018–19	Panteleymon Lappo	Petr Dron	Oleg Krasikov	Nikolay Cherednichenko	Gleb Ljasnikov	RMCCup 2018 (4th)
2018–19	Oleg Krasikov	Artem Vajhonskij	Danil Kiba	Gleb Ljasnikov	Dmitriy Logvin	RMCC 2019 (8th)
2019–20	Oleg Krasikov	Artyom Bukarev	Sergey Varlamov	Danil Kiba	Rudolf Zaharyan	RMCCup 2019 (9th)
2020–21	Oleg Krasikov	Petr Dron	Sergey Varlamov	Danil Kiba	Matvey Vakin	RMCCup 2020 (11th)
2020–21	Oleg Krasikov	Danil Kiba	Petr Dron	Gleb Ljasnikov	Sergey Varlamov	RMCC 2020 (8th)

=== Mixed ===
Season	Skip	Third	Second	Lead	Events
2017–18	Alexey Stukalskiy	Mariia Ermeichuk	Oleg Krasikov	Aida Afanasjeva	RMxCCup 2017 (gold)
2017–18	Alexey Stukalskiy	Mariia Ermeichuk	Oleg Krasikov	Margarita Evdokimova	WMxCC 2017 (5th)
2017–18	Alexey Stukalskiy	Anastasia Halanskaja	Oleg Krasikov	Aida Afanasjeva	RMxCC 2018 (bronze)
2018—19	Alexey Stukalskiy	Mariia Ermeichuk	Oleg Krasikov	Anastasia Halanskaja	RMxCC 2019 (gold)
2019—20	Alexey Stukalskiy	Anastasia Halanskaja	Oleg Krasikov	Mariia Drozdova	RMxCCup 2019 (6th)

=== Mixed doubles ===
Season	Female	Male	Events
2015–16	Polina Bikker	Oleg Krasikov	RMDCC 2016 (21st)
2016–17	Polina Bikker	Oleg Krasikov	RMDCCup 2016 (5th)
2019–20	Anastasia Halanskaja	Oleg Krasikov	RMDCCup 2019 (9th)
2019–20	Margarita Evdokimova	Oleg Krasikov	RMDCC 2020 (15th)
2020–21	Nkeirouka Ezekh	Oleg Krasikov	RMDCC 2021 (gold)
2021–22	Olga Antonova	Oleg Krasikov	RMDCCup 2021 (4th)
