= Mikhail Vaskov =

Russian curler

- Curler
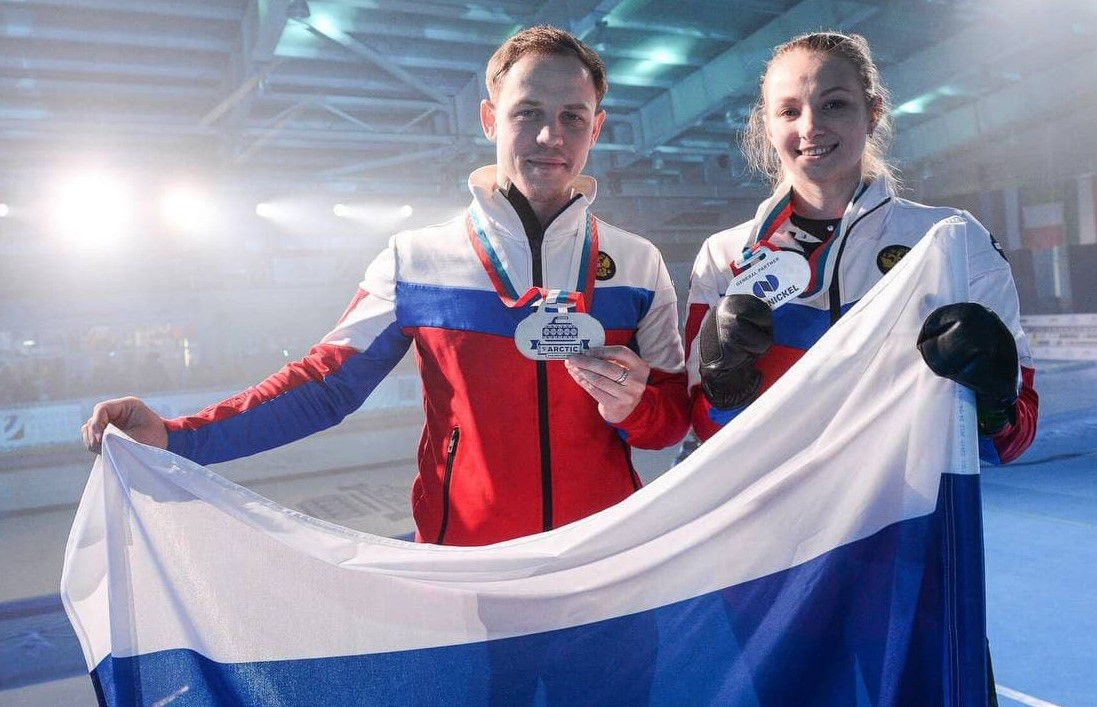
- Born: 4 March 1994 (age 32); Dmitrov, Moscow Oblast, Russia

Team
- Skip: Alexander Eremin
- Third: Mikhail Vaskov
- Second: Alexey Tuzov
- Lead: Alexey Kulikov
- Alternate: Kirill Savenkov
- Mixed doubles partner: Anna Samoylik

Curling career
- Member Association: Russia
- European Championship: 1 (2018)
- Other appearances: World Junior Curling Championships: 1 (2015), European Junior Curling Challenge: 1 (2015), Winter Youth Olympics: 1 (2012)
Medal record
Men's curling
Russian Men's Championship
Silver medal – second place	2017 Sochi
Silver medal – second place	2018 Sochi

Mikhail Sergeevich Vaskov (Russian: Михаи́л Серге́евич Васько́в; born 4 March 1994 in Dmitrov, Moscow Oblast, Russia) is a Russian male curler. He was the skip for the Russian national men's curling team at the 2018 European Curling Championships.

== Awards ==
- Master of Sports of Russia (curling, 2015).
- Russian Men's Curling Championship: silver (2017), bronze (2018).
- Russian Men's Curling Cup: silver (2016).
- European Junior Curling Challenge: gold (2015).
- Russian Mixed Curling Championship: bronze (2012, 2013).
- Russian Mixed Curling Cup: bronze (2018).
- Russian Mixed Doubles Curling Championship: bronze (2018, 2020).
- Russian Mixed Doubles Curling Cup: silver (2018).

== Teams and events ==
=== Men's ===
Season	Skip	Third	Second	Lead	Alternate	Coach	Events
2009–10	Vladislav Chernobaev	Mikhail Vaskov	Dmitry Antipov	Alexandr Korshunov	Pavel Mishin		RMCCh 2010 (11th)
2010–11	Mikhail Vaskov	Alexandr Korshunov	Alexey Kulikov	Dmitry Antipov	Pavel Mishin		RMCCup 2010 (13th)
2011–12	Mikhail Vaskov	Alexey Kulikov	Alexandr Korshunov	Pavel Mishin	Kirill Savenkov		RMCCh 2012 (10th)
2012–13	Mikhail Vaskov	Alexey Kulikov	Alexandr Korshunov	Pavel Mishin			RMCCh 2013 (12th)
2013–14	Mikhail Vaskov	Alexandr Korshunov	Alexey Kulikov	Pavel Mishin			RMCCup 2013 (5th)
2013–14	Mikhail Vaskov	?	?	?			RMCCh 2014 (9th)
2014–15	Mikhail Vaskov	?	?	?			RMCCup 2014 (11th)
2014–15	Artur Ali	Timur Gadzhikhanov	Alexandr Kuzmin	Panteleimon Lappo	Mikhail Vaskov	Mikhail Bruskov	EJCC 2015 (gold)
2014–15	Artur Ali	Timur Gadzhikhanov	Alexandr Kuzmin	Mikhail Vaskov	Panteleimon Lappo	Mikhail Bruskov	WJCC 2015 (9th)
2016–17	Alexander Eremin	Mikhail Vaskov	Alexey Tuzov	Alexey Kulikov	Kirill Savenkov		RMCCup 2016 (silver)
2016–17	Alexey Kulikov (fourth)	Alexey Tuzov	Alexander Eremin (skip)	Mikhail Vaskov	Petr Kuznetsov		RMCCh 2017 (silver)
2017–18	Mikhail Vaskov	Alexey Tuzov	Petr Kuznetsov	Alexey Kulikov			RMCCup 2017 (5th)
2017–18	Alexander Eremin	Alexey Kulikov	Alexey Tuzov	Mikhail Vaskov	Petr Kuznetsov		RMCCh 2018 (bronze)
2018–19	Mikhail Vaskov	Alexey Tuzov	Petr Kuznetsov	Alexey Kulikov	Anton Kalalb (ECC)	Aleksandr Kozyrev	ECC 2018 (7th); RMCCh 2019 (5th)
2019–20	Mikhail Vaskov	Alexey Kulikov	Petr Kuznetsov	Kirill Savenkov			RMCCup 2019 (10th)
2020–21	Alexander Eremin	Mikhail Vaskov	Alexey Tuzov	Alexey Kulikov	Kirill Savenkov	Anna Gretskaya; Dmitry Stepanov	RMCCup 2020 (gold)

=== Mixed ===
Season	Skip	Third	Second	Lead	Alternate	Coach	Events
2008–09	Vladislav Chernobaev	Anna Gretskaya	Mikhail Vaskov	Anastasia Moskaleva			RMxCCh 2009 (11th)
2009–10	Marina Kalinina	Mikhail Vaskov	Daria Morozova	Alexandr Korshunov	Elena Ushakova, Alexey Kulikov		RMxCCh 2010 (9th)
2010–11	Mikhail Vaskov	Anastasia Moskaleva	Alexandr Korshunov	Marina Verenich	Alexey Kulikov		RMxCCh 2011 (7th)
2011–12	Mikhail Vaskov	Anastasia Moskaleva	Alexandr Korshunov	Marina Verenich		Anna Gretskaya (WYOG)	WYOG 2012 (11th); RMxCCh 2012 (bronze)
2012–13	Mikhail Vaskov	Anastasia Moskaleva	Alexandr Korshunov	Marina Verenich			RMxCCh 2013 (bronze)
2013–14	Mikhail Vaskov	Anastasia Moskaleva	Alexandr Korshunov	Marina Verenich			RMxCCh 2014 (11th)
2014–15	Mikhail Vaskov	Anastasia Moskaleva	Alexandr Korshunov	Marina Verenich			RMxCCup 2014 (11th)
2015–16	Mikhail Vaskov	?	?	?			RMxCCh 2016 (5th)
2016–17	Mikhail Vaskov	Anastasia Moskaleva	Alexey Kulikov	Daria Styoksova			RMxCCh 2017 (7th)
2017–18	Anastasia Moskaleva	Mikhail Vaskov	Olga Kotelnikova	Alexey Kulikov			RMxCCh 2018 (9th)
2018–19	Mikhail Vaskov	Vlada Rumiantseva	Alexey Tuzov	Daria Morozova			RMxCCup 2018 (bronze)
2020–21	Mikhail Vaskov (fourth)	Vlada Rumiantseva (skip)	Petr Kuznetsov	Anastasiya Mishchenko			RMxCCh 2020 (4th)

=== Mixed doubles ===
Season	Male	Female	Events
2011–12	Mikhail Vaskov	Zuzana Hrůzová	WYOG 2012 (5th)
2012–13	Mikhail Vaskov	Anastasia Moskaleva	RMDCCup 2012 (9th); RMDCCh 2013 (5th)
2013–14	Mikhail Vaskov	Anastasia Moskaleva	RMDCCup 2013 (5th); RMDCCh 2014 (5th)
2014–15	Mikhail Vaskov	Anastasia Moskaleva	RMDCCh 2015 (9th)
2015–16	Mikhail Vaskov	Vlada Rumiantseva	RMDCCup 2015 (23rd)
2015–16	Mikhail Vaskov	Olga Kotelnikova	RMDCCh 2016 (9th)
2016–17	Mikhail Vaskov	Anastasia Moskaleva	RMDCCh 2017 (13th)
2017–18	Mikhail Vaskov	Daria Styoksova	RMDCCh 2018 (bronze)
2018–19	Mikhail Vaskov	Daria Styoksova	RMDCCup 2018 (silver); RMDCCh 2019 (6th)
2019–20	Mikhail Vaskov	Daria Styoksova	RMDCCh 2020 (bronze)
2020–21	Mikhail Vaskov	Daria Morozova	RMDCCh 2021 (T5th)
