= Anna Samoylik =

Russian curler (born 1995)

- Curler
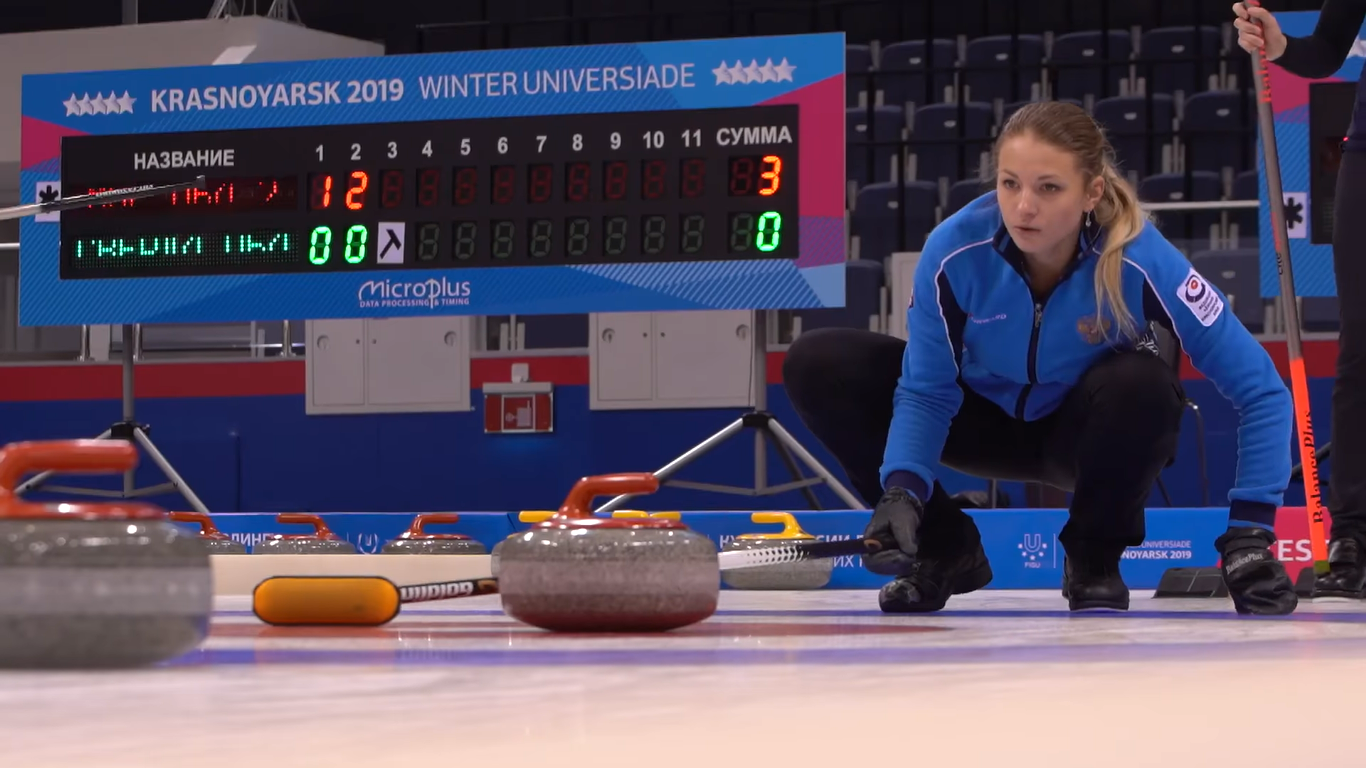
- Born: 28 August 1995 (age 31); Krasnoyarsk, Russia

Team
- Mixed doubles partner: Mikhail Vaskov

Curling career
- Member Association: Russia
- Other appearances: Winter Universiade: 1 (2019)
Medal record
Curling
Representing Russia
Bronze medal – third place	2019 Krasnoyarsk

Anna Sergeevna Samoylik (Russian: А́нна Серге́евна Само́йлик) née Venevtseva (Russian: Вене́вцева) (born 28 August 1995 in Krasnoyarsk) is a Russian curler. She competes in mixed doubles curling on the World Curling Tour with teammate Mikhail Vaskov.

Samoylik played on the Russian Team at the 2019 Winter Universiade, in her hometown of Krasnoyarsk. As the alternate on the team skipped by Uliana Vasileva, she only saw ice time in one game, against Switzerland. The team took home the bronze medal.

On the World Curling Tour, she and partner Mikhail Vaskov won the 2021 MD Moscow Classic, and have been runners up at the 2021 WCT Arctic Cup, Sirius Cup and Pacific Cup Vladivostok. She was also the runner-up at the 2019 WCT Dutch Masters Mixed Doubles with partner Vasily Groshev.

== Personal life ==
Samoylik is also a top golfer in the Krasnoyarsk Krai. Her father introduced curling to the region. She lived in Norilsk for one year as a child. She married Pavel Samoylik in 2020.
