= Daniil Goriachev =

Russian curler (born 1995)

- Curler
- Born: 12 January 1995 (age 31); Saint Petersburg, Russia

Team
- Curling club: CK Adamant, Saint Petersburg
- Skip: Sergey Glukhov
- Third: Evgeny Klimov
- Second: Dmitry Mironov
- Lead: Anton Kalalb
- Alternate: Daniil Goriachev
- Mixed doubles partner: Maria Komarova

Curling career
- Member Association: Russia
- World Championship: 1 (2021)
- World Mixed Doubles Championship: 1 (2018)
- European Championship: 1 (2021)
- Olympic: 1 (2022)
Medal record
Curling
Representing Russia
World Mixed Curling Championship
| Gold medal – first place | 2016 Kazan |
| Bronze medal – third place | 2018 Kelowna |
World Mixed Doubles Curling Championship
| Silver medal – second place | 2018 Östersund |

Daniil Olegovich Goriachev (Note: Also known as Daniil Goryachev.) (Russian: Дании́л Оле́гович Горя́чев; born 12 January 1995 in Saint Petersburg, Russia) is a Russian male curler.

== Personal life ==
Goriachev is currently a student at the Saint Petersburg State University.

== Awards ==
- International Class Master of Sports of Russia (curling, 2016).
- Russian Men's Curling Championship: gold (2019).
- Russian Men's Curling Cup: silver (2020).
- World Mixed Curling Championship: gold (2016), bronze (2018).
- Russian Mixed Curling Championship: gold (2016, 2017), silver (2015).
- World Mixed Doubles Curling Championship: silver (2018).
- Russian Mixed Doubles Curling Championship: bronze (2017).

== Teams and events ==
=== Men's ===
| Season | Skip | Third | Second | Lead | Alternate | Coach | Events |
|---|---|---|---|---|---|---|---|
| 2008–09 | Ivan Korolenko | Ilya Rutenberg | Daniil Goriachev | Anastasia Bryzgalova | | | |
| 2011–12 | Panteleimon Lappo | Ivan Aleksandrov | Daniil Goriachev | Nikolay Cherednichenko | Semyon Osipov | | |
| 2014–15 | Alexander Krushelnitskiy | Daniil Goriachev | Vladislav Goncharenko | Ilya Badilin | Ivan Uledev | | |
| 2015–16 | Egor Zubakin | Vladimir Raskhoroshin | Alexandr Bystrov | Daniil Goriachev | | | |
| 2015–16 | Timur Gadzhikhanov (fourth) | Daniil Goriachev | Dmitry Solomatin | Alexander Eremin (skip) | Lev Puzakov | Alexey Tselousov | WJCC 2016 (7th) |
| 2018–19 | Alexey Timofeev | Daniil Goriachev | Alexey Stukalskiy | Artur Razhabov | Evgeny Klimov | | RMCCh 2019 (gold) |
| 2020–21 | Alexey Timofeev | Daniil Goriachev | Evgeny Klimov | Artur Razhabov | Aleksandr Bystrov | Anastasia Bryzgalova | RMCCup 2020 (silver) |

=== Mixed ===
| Season | Skip | Third | Second | Lead | Coach | Events |
|---|---|---|---|---|---|---|
| 2014–15 | Alexander Krushelnitskiy | Anastasia Bryzgalova | Daniil Goriachev | Maria Duyunova | | RMxCCh 2015 (silver) |
| 2015–16 | Alexander Krushelnitskiy | Anastasia Bryzgalova | Daniil Goriachev | Maria Duyunova | | RMxCCh 2016 (gold) |
| 2016–17 | Alexander Krushelnitskiy | Anastasia Bryzgalova | Daniil Goriachev | Maria Duyunova | Vasily Gudin (WMxCC) | WMxCC 2016 (gold); RMxCCh 2017 (gold) |
| 2017–18 | Anastasia Bryzgalova | Daniil Goriachev | Maria Duyunova | Alexandr Bystrov | | RMxCCh 2018 (7th) |
| 2018–19 | Alexander Eremin | Maria Komarova | Daniil Goriachev | Anastasia Moskaleva | Vasily Gudin | WMxCC 2018 (bronze) |
| 2020–21 | Daniil Goriachev | Aleksandra Antonova | Aleksandr Bystrov | Arina Zasedateleva | | RMxCCh 2020 (10th) |

=== Mixed doubles ===
| Season | Male | Female | Coach | Events |
|---|---|---|---|---|
| 2016–17 | Daniil Goriachev | Maria Komarova | | RMDCCh 2017 (bronze) |
| 2017–18 | Daniil Goriachev | Maria Komarova | Vasily Gudin | WMDCC 2018 (silver) |
| 2018–19 | Daniil Goriachev | Maria Komarova | Vasily Gudin | CWC/1 (5th); CWC/3 (6th); RMDCCh 2019 (7th); CWC/final (8th) |
