= Sergey Glukhov =

Russian curler (born 1993)

Sergey Glukhov Сергей Глухов
- Curler
- Born: 7 January 1993 (age 33); Troitsk, Chelyabinsk Oblast

Team
- Curling club: Ice Cube CC, Sochi, RUS
- Skip: Sergey Glukhov
- Third: Evgeny Klimov
- Second: Dmitry Mironov
- Lead: Anton Kalalb
- Alternate: Daniil Goriachev
- Mixed doubles partner: Alina Kovaleva

Curling career
- Member Association: Russia
- World Championship: 4 (2014, 2018, 2019, 2021)
- European Championship: 3 (2017, 2019, 2021)
- Olympic: 1 (2022)
Medal record
Men's curling
Representing Russia
World Junior Championships
Silver medal – second place	2013 Sochi

Sergey Andreevich Glukhov (Russian: Сергей Глухов; born 7 January 1993) is a Russian curler from Chelyabinsk, currently residing in Sochi.

== Career ==
Glukhov has been to two World Junior Curling Championships. He won a silver medal at the 2013 World Junior Curling Championships, playing third for Evgeny Arkhipov. Glukhov also represented Russia at the 2014 World Junior Curling Championships as skip. He led his team of Artur Ali, Dmitry Mironov, and Timur Gadzhikhanov to a 7th-place finish with a 4-5 record.

Glukhov just missed out on a chance to represent Russia at the 2014 Winter Olympics but joined the Russian men's team at the 2014 World Men's Curling Championship at the last minute when the normal skip of the team, Andrey Drozdov, could not play.

Glukhov returned to the Russian men's team in 2017 (skipped by Alexey Timofeev), playing for the team at the 2017 European Curling Championships, the 2018 Olympic Qualifying Event and the 2018 World Men's Curling Championship. At the Europeans, he was officially the alternate for the team but played in 6 games. The team finished in sixth place. At the Olympic qualification event, Glukhov played third for the team, which finished fourth, failing to qualify for the Olympics. At the World Championship, the team placed 9th.

The following season, Glukhov began skipping his own rink with Artur Ali, Dmitry Mironov, and Anton Kalalb. He led Russia to a 4-8 record at the 2019 World Men's Curling Championship, good enough for 9th place again.
