= Anton Kalalb =

Russian curler (born 1988)

Anton Kalalb Антон Калалб
- Curler
- Born: 16 March 1988 (age 38); Saint Petersburg, U.S.S.R.

Team
- Curling club: Adamant CC, Saint Petersburg, RUS
- Skip: Sergey Glukhov
- Third: Evgeny Klimov
- Second: Dmitry Mironov
- Lead: Anton Kalalb
- Alternate: Daniil Goriachev

Curling career
- Member Association: Russia
- World Championship: 4 (2013, 2015, 2019, 2021)
- European Championship: 7 (2010, 2012, 2014, 2015, 2018, 2019, 2021)
- Olympic: 1 (2022)
Medal record
Men's curling
Representing Russia
Winter Universiade
Silver medal – second place	2015 Granada

Anton Igorevich Kalalb (Russian: Антон Игоревич Калалб; born 16 March 1988 in Saint Petersburg) is a Russian curler from Sochi.

Kalalb was a member of the Russian team at the 2010, 2012 and 2014 European Curling Championships. He was the alternate on the Russian team in both 2010 and 2012. At the 2010 European Curling Championships he played in all nine games for the team, which was skipped by Andrey Drozdov and finished 9th. At the 2012 European Curling Championships he would play in three games for the team, which finished fifth. At the 2014 European Curling Championships, he played lead for Evgeny Arkhipov, finishing sixth. The placement qualified the team to represent Russia at the 2015 Ford World Men's Curling Championship. At the 2015 Worlds, the Russian team finished last. Kalalb also played in the 2013 Ford World Men's Curling Championship as the alternate. He would play in two games, and the team finished in 10th.

Also in 2015, Kalalb was a member of the Russian team (skipped by Arkhipov) that won a silver medal at the 2015 Winter Universiade. He was also a member of the Russian team at the 2011 European Mixed Curling Championship, which finished 13th.

== Personal life ==
Kalalb is married.
