= Maria Komarova =

Russian curler (born 1998)

- Curler
- Born: 24 April 1998 (age 28); Saint Petersburg

Team
- Curling club: Adamant CC, Saint Petersburg, RUS
- Skip: Alina Kovaleva
- Third: Galina Arsenkina
- Second: Maria Komarova
- Lead: Ekaterina Kuzmina
- Alternate: Vera Tyulyakova
- Mixed doubles partner: Daniil Goriachev

Curling career
- Member Association: Russia
- World Championship: 1 (2021)
- World Mixed Doubles Championship: 1 (2018)
- European Championship: 2 (2019, 2021)
- Olympic: 1 (2022)
- Other appearances: World Mixed Curling Championship: 1 (2018), World Junior Championships: 2 (2016, 2017), Winter Universiade: 1 (2019)
Medal record
Curling
Representing RCF
World Curling Championships
Silver medal – second place	2021 Calgary
Representing Russia
World Mixed Championship
Bronze medal – third place	2018 Kelowna
World Mixed Doubles Championship
Silver medal – second place	2018 Östersund
Winter Universiade
Bronze medal – third place	2019 Krasnoyarsk
Russian Women's Championship
Bronze medal – third place	2016

Maria Andreevna Komarova (Russian: Мари́я Андре́евна Комаро́ва; born 24 April 1998 in Saint Petersburg) is a Russian female curler. She currently plays third on Team Alina Kovaleva.

== Teams and events ==
=== Women's ===
Season	Skip	Third	Second	Lead	Alternate	Coach	Events
2014–15	Alina Kovaleva	Uliana Vasilyeva	Elena Efimova	Oxana Bogdanova	Maria Komarova	Alexey Tselousov	RWCCh 2015 (silver)
2015–16	Uliana Vasilyeva (fourth)	Maria Baksheeva	Ekaterina Kuzmina	Evgeniya Demkina (skip)	Maria Komarova	Irina Kolesnikova	WJCC 2016 (7th)
2015–16	Alina Kovaleva	Uliana Vasilyeva	Ekaterina Kuzmina	Maria Komarova	Oxana Bogdanova	Alexey Tselousov	RWCCh 2016 (bronze)
2016–17	Maria Baksheeva	Maria Komarova	Olga Kotelnikova	Daria Patrikeeva	Oxana Bogdanova		
2016–17	Maria Baksheeva	Alina Kovaleva	Uliana Vasilyeva	Maria Komarova	Ekaterina Kuzmina		RWCCup 2016 (5th)
2016–17	Maria Baksheeva	Daria Morozova	Maria Komarova	Ekaterina Kuzmina	Olga Kotelnikova	Alexey Tselousov	WJCC 2017 (6th)
2016–17	Alina Kovaleva	Uliana Vasilyeva	Ekaterina Kuzmina	Maria Komarova	Maria Baksheeva	Alexey Tselousov	RWCCh 2017 (silver)
2017–18	Alina Kovaleva	Maria Komarova	Galina Arsenkina	Ekaterina Kuzmina	Anastasia Danshina		
2018–19	Maria Komarova (fourth)	Uliana Vasilyeva (skip)	Anastasia Danshina	Ekaterina Kuzmina	Anna Venevtseva	Alina Kovaleva, Viktor Vorobev	WUG 2019 (bronze)
2018–19	Alina Kovaleva	Maria Komarova	Galina Arsenkina	Ekaterina Kuzmina	Anastasia Danshina		
2018–19	Maria Komarova	Vera Tiuliakova	Irina Nizovtseva	Diana Margarian	Nadegda Beliakova		RWCCh 2019 (11th)
2019–20	Alina Kovaleva	Maria Komarova	Galina Arsenkina	Ekaterina Kuzmina	Anastasia Danshina		
2020–21	Alina Kovaleva	Maria Komarova	Galina Arsenkina	Ekaterina Kuzmina	Vera Tyulyakova	Anastasia Bryzgalova	RWCCup 2020 (gold)
2020–21	Alina Kovaleva	Yulia Portunova	Galina Arsenkina	Ekaterina Kuzmina	Maria Komarova	Sergei Belanov, Irina Kolesnikova	WWCC 2021 (silver)
2021–22	Alina Kovaleva	Yulia Portunova	Galina Arsenkina	Ekaterina Kuzmina	Maria Komarova	Sergei Belanov, Irina Kolesnikova	ECC 2021 (4th)
2022–23	Alina Kovaleva	Galina Arsenkina	Maria Komarova	Ekaterina Kuzmina	Vera Tyulyakova	Anastasia Bryzgalova	RWCCup 2022 (gold)

=== Mixed ===
Season	Skip	Third	Second	Lead	Alternate	Coach	Events
2012–13	Alina Kovaleva	Alexey Timofeev	Maria Komarova	Evgeny Klimov	Anna Efimova		RMxCCh 2013 (7th)
2016–17	Evgeny Klimov	Maria Komarova	Aleksandr Bystrov	Olesya Glushchenko			RMxCCh 2017 (7th)
2018–19	Alexander Eremin	Maria Komarova	Daniil Goriachev	Anastasia Moskaleva		Vasily Gudin	WMxCC 2018 (bronze)

=== Mixed doubles ===
Season	Male	Female	Coach	Events
2015–16	Alexey Timofeev	Maria Komarova		RMDCCh 2016 (9th)
2016–17	Daniil Goriachev	Maria Komarova		RMDCCh 2017 (bronze)
2017–18	Daniil Goriachev	Maria Komarova	Vasily Gudin	WMDCC 2018 (silver)
2018–19	Daniil Goriachev	Maria Komarova	Vasily Gudin	CWC/1 (5th); CWC/3 (6th); RMDCCh 2019 (7th); CWC/final (8th)
