= 2019 Champions Cup (curling) =

Grand Slam of Curling event

2019 Humpty's Champions Cup
- Host city: Saskatoon, Saskatchewan
- Arena: Merlis Belsher Place
- Dates: April 23–28
- Men's winner: (Alberta) Team Bottcher
- Skip: Brendan Bottcher
- Third: Darren Moulding
- Second: Brad Thiessen
- Lead: Karrick Martin
- Finalist: (Alberta) Kevin Koe
- Women's winner: (Switzerland) Team Tirinzoni
- Skip: Silvana Tirinzoni
- Fourth: Alina Pätz
- Second: Esther Neuenschwander
- Lead: Melanie Barbezat
- Finalist: (Manitoba) Kerri Einarson

The 2019 Humpty's Champions Cup was held from April 23 to 28 at the Merlis Belsher Place in Saskatoon, Saskatchewan. It was the eighth and final Grand Slam event of the 2018–19 curling season. In the men's final, Brendan Bottcher defeated Kevin Koe 6–5 to win his 3rd career Grand Slam. In the women's final, Silvana Tirinzoni defeated Kerri Einarson 6–3 to win her 2nd career Slam.

== No tick zone ==
The 2019 Champions Cup tested a new rule, where tick shots were disallowed in the 8th and extra ends. Any rock that touches the centre line in those ends was not allowed to be moved by an opposing rock until after the fifth rock of the end had been played. This rule had previously been used in the defunct Elite 10 Grand Slam event.

== Qualification ==
The champions of thirteen Grand Slam, national or regional championships, and world championship events are invited to the Champions Cup. The champions of two World Curling Tour events, based on the strength of field, are also invited. If a team qualifies from more than one event or declines the invitation, champions of World Curling Tour events with the highest strength of field are invited until the field of 15 teams is completed.

=== Men ===
Event	Team	Note
2018 Players' Championship	(Alberta) Kevin Koe	
2018 Champions Cup	(Newfoundland and Labrador) Brad Gushue	
2018 Elite 10	(Newfoundland and Labrador) ~~Brad Gushue~~	Already qualified
2018 Masters	(Ontario) John Epping	
2018 Tour Challenge (Tier 1)	(Ontario) Brad Jacobs	
2018 National	(Scotland) Ross Paterson	
2019 Canadian Open	(Alberta) Brendan Bottcher	
2018 Pacific-Asia Curling Championships	(Japan) Yuta Matsumura	
2018 European Curling Championships	(Scotland) Bruce Mouat	
2019 United States Men's Curling Championship	(United States) John Shuster	
2019 World Junior Curling Championships	(British Columbia) Tyler Tardi	
2019 Tim Hortons Brier	(Alberta) ~~Kevin Koe~~	Already qualified
2019 World Men's Curling Championship	(Sweden) Niklas Edin	
WCT event #1 (Home Hardware Canada Cup of Curling)	(Ontario) ~~Brad Jacobs~~	Already qualified
WCT event #2 (Canad Inns Men's Classic)	(Alberta) ~~Brendan Bottcher~~	Already qualified
WCT event #3 (AMJ Campbell Shorty Jenkins Classic)	(Ontario) ~~John Epping~~	Already qualified
WCT event #4 (Ashley HomeStore Curling Classic)	(Scotland) ~~Glen Muirhead~~	Declined invitation
WCT event #6 (Stu Sells Toronto Tankard)	(Manitoba) Reid Carruthers	
WCT event #7 (Swiss Cup Basel)	(Sweden) ~~Niklas Edin~~	Already qualified
WCT event #8 (DEKALB Superspiel)	(Saskatchewan) Matt Dunstone	
WCT event #9 (Baden Masters)	(Norway) ~~Thomas Ulsrud~~	Declined invitation
WCT event #10 (Stu Sells Oakville Tankard)	(Switzerland) Yannick Schwaller	
WCT event #11 (GSOC Tour Challenge Tier 2)	(Saskatchewan) Kirk Muyres	

=== Women ===
Event	Team	Note
2018 Players' Championship	(United States) Jamie Sinclair	
2018 Champions Cup	(Ontario) Rachel Homan	
2018 Elite 10	(Sweden) Anna Hasselborg	
2018 Masters	(Sweden) ~~Anna Hasselborg~~	Already qualified
2018 Tour Challenge (Tier 1)	(Ontario) ~~Rachel Homan~~	Already qualified
2018 National	(Ontario) ~~Rachel Homan~~	Already qualified
2019 Canadian Open	(Ontario) ~~Rachel Homan~~	Already qualified
2018 Pacific-Asia Curling Championships	(South Korea) Kim Min-ji	
2018 European Curling Championships	(Sweden) ~~Anna Hasselborg~~	Already qualified
2019 United States Women's Curling Championship	(United States) ~~Jamie Sinclair~~	Already qualified
2019 World Junior Curling Championships	(Russia) Vlada Rumiantseva	
2019 Scotties Tournament of Hearts	(Alberta) Chelsea Carey	
2019 World Women's Curling Championship	(Switzerland) Silvana Tirinzoni	
WCT event #1 (Home Hardware Canada Cup of Curling)	(Manitoba) Jennifer Jones	
WCT event #2 (Canad Inns Women's Classic)	(Alberta) ~~Chelsea Carey~~	Already qualified
WCT event #3 (Curlers Corner Autumn Gold Curling Classic)	(Manitoba) Kerri Einarson	
WCT event #4 (Stu Sells Oakville Tankard)	(Manitoba) ~~Kerri Einarson~~	Already qualified
WCT event #5 (AMJ Campbell Shorty Jenkins Classic)	(Sweden) Isabella Wranå	
WCT event #6 (Stockholm Ladies Curling Cup)	(Sweden) ~~Anna Hasselborg~~	Already qualified
WCT event #7 (Red Deer Curling Classic)	(Saskatchewan) Robyn Silvernagle	
WCT event #8 (GSOC Tour Challenge Tier 2)	(Switzerland) Elena Stern	
WCT event #9 (Schweizer Cup)	(Switzerland) ~~Silvana Tirinzoni~~	Already qualified
WCT event #10 (Colonial Square Ladies Classic)	(Manitoba) ~~Darcy Robertson~~	Declined invitation
WCT event #11 (Prestige Hotels & Resorts Curling Classic)	(Russia) Alina Kovaleva	
WCT event #12 (Women's Masters Basel)	(Switzerland) ~~Elena Stern~~	Already qualified
WCT event #13 (HDF Insurance Shoot-Out)	(Alberta) Casey Scheidegger	
WCT event #14 (DEKALB Superspiel)	(Manitoba) Allison Flaxey	

== Men ==
=== Teams ===
The teams are listed as follows:

Skip	Third	Second	Lead	Locale
Brendan Bottcher	Darren Moulding	Brad Thiessen	Karrick Martin	Edmonton, Alberta
Mike McEwen	Reid Carruthers	Derek Samagalski	Colin Hodgson	Winnipeg, Manitoba
Matt Dunstone	Braeden Moskowy	Catlin Schneider	Dustin Kidby	Regina, Saskatchewan
Niklas Edin	Jim Cotter (Note: Jim Cotter replaced Team Edin's third, Oskar Eriksson, who was competing in the 2019 World Mixed Doubles Curling Championship.)	Rasmus Wranå	Christoffer Sundgren	Karlstad, Sweden
John Epping	Matt Camm	Brent Laing	Craig Savill	Toronto, Ontario
Brad Gushue	Mark Nichols	Colton Lott (Note: Colton Lott replaced Team Gushue's second, Brett Gallant, who was competing in the 2019 World Mixed Doubles Curling Championship.)	Geoff Walker	St. John's, Newfoundland and Labrador
Brad Jacobs	Ryan Fry	E.J. Harnden	Ryan Harnden	Sault Ste. Marie, Ontario
Kevin Koe	B.J. Neufeld	Colton Flasch	Ben Hebert	Calgary, Alberta
Yuta Matsumura	Tetsuro Shimizu	Yasumasa Tanida	Shinya Abe	Sapporo, Japan
Bruce Mouat	Grant Hardie	Bobby Lammie	Hammy McMillan Jr.	Edinburgh, Scotland
Kirk Muyres	Kevin Marsh	Dan Marsh	Dallan Muyres	Saskatoon, Saskatchewan
Ross Paterson	Kyle Waddell	Duncan Menzies	Michael Goodfellow	Glasgow, Scotland
Yannick Schwaller	Michael Brunner	Romano Meier	Marcel Käufeler	Bern, Switzerland
John Morris (Note: John Morris replaced Team Shuster's skip, John Shuster, who was competing in the 2019 World Mixed Doubles Curling Championship.)	Chris Plys	Matt Hamilton	John Landsteiner	Duluth, United States
Tyler Tardi	Sterling Middleton	Matthew Hall	Alex Horvath	Langley, British Columbia

=== Round-robin standings ===
Final round-robin standings

Key
Teams to playoffs
Teams to tiebreakers

Pool A	W	L	PF	PA	SO
(Alberta) Kevin Koe	3	1	29	17	71.10
(Newfoundland and Labrador) Brad Gushue	3	1	26	17	86.60
(Ontario) John Epping	2	2	20	21	66.30
(Saskatchewan) Kirk Muyres	1	3	14	25	
(Switzerland) Yannick Schwaller	1	3	17	28	

Pool B	W	L	PF	PA	SO
(Sweden) Niklas Edin	4	0	26	17	140.40
(United States) Team Shuster	3	1	29	20	75.70
(Ontario) Brad Jacobs	2	2	27	19	103.50
(Japan) Yuta Matsumura	1	3	12	26	
(Scotland) Ross Paterson	0	4	18	30	

Pool C	W	L	PF	PA	SO
(Alberta) Brendan Bottcher	4	0	31	20	17.10
(Scotland) Bruce Mouat	3	1	22	19	77.80
(Saskatchewan) Matt Dunstone	2	2	27	29	264.60
(Manitoba) Team Carruthers	1	3	20	22	
(British Columbia) Tyler Tardi	0	4	16	26	

=== Round-robin results ===
All draw times are listed in Central Standard Time (UTC−6).

==== Draw 1 ====
Tuesday, April 23, 4:30 pm

Sheet E	1	2	3	4	5	6	7	8	Final
(United States) Team Shuster 🔨	0	3	0	3	0	1	X	X	7
(Japan) Yuta Matsumura	0	0	1	0	1	0	X	X	2

==== Draw 2 ====
Tuesday, April 23, 8:00 pm

Sheet C	1	2	3	4	5	6	7	8	Final
(Newfoundland and Labrador) Brad Gushue 🔨	1	1	1	1	1	1	X	X	6
(Saskatchewan) Kirk Muyres	0	0	0	0	0	0	X	X	0

Sheet E	1	2	3	4	5	6	7	8	9	Final
(Saskatchewan) Matt Dunstone 🔨	1	0	0	0	1	2	0	2	1	7
(British Columbia) Tyler Tardi	0	0	0	4	0	0	2	0	0	6

==== Draw 3 ====
Wednesday, April 24, 12:00 pm

Sheet B	1	2	3	4	5	6	7	8	Final
(Sweden) Niklas Edin	1	1	0	0	2	0	1	0	5
(Scotland) Ross Paterson 🔨	0	0	0	1	0	2	0	1	4

Sheet C	1	2	3	4	5	6	7	8	Final
(Ontario) John Epping 🔨	3	0	2	0	3	X	X	X	8
(Switzerland) Yannick Schwaller	0	1	0	1	0	X	X	X	2

Sheet D	1	2	3	4	5	6	7	8	Final
(Ontario) Brad Jacobs 🔨	0	2	0	0	3	2	X	X	7
(Japan) Yuta Matsumura	0	0	0	1	0	0	X	X	1

Sheet E	1	2	3	4	5	6	7	8	Final
(Scotland) Bruce Mouat 🔨	1	0	0	2	0	0	2	X	5
(Manitoba) Team Carruthers	0	0	1	0	2	0	0	X	3

==== Draw 4 ====
Wednesday, April 24, 4:00 pm

Sheet D	1	2	3	4	5	6	7	8	9	Final
(Alberta) Brendan Bottcher 🔨	0	2	0	3	1	0	2	0	1	9
(Saskatchewan) Matt Dunstone	0	0	4	0	0	2	0	2	0	8

==== Draw 5 ====
Wednesday, April 24, 8:00 pm

Sheet A	1	2	3	4	5	6	7	8	9	Final
(Ontario) Brad Jacobs	1	1	0	0	1	1	0	2	0	6
(United States) Team Shuster 🔨	0	0	2	3	0	0	1	0	1	7

Sheet B	1	2	3	4	5	6	7	8	Final
(Alberta) Kevin Koe 🔨	0	3	0	2	0	1	0	3	9
(Saskatchewan) Kirk Muyres	1	0	1	0	2	0	1	0	5

Sheet E	1	2	3	4	5	6	7	8	Final
(Newfoundland and Labrador) Brad Gushue	0	0	3	0	1	0	3	X	7
(Switzerland) Yannick Schwaller 🔨	1	2	0	1	0	1	0	X	5

==== Draw 6 ====
Thursday, April 25, 8:30 am

Sheet A	1	2	3	4	5	6	7	8	Final
(Scotland) Ross Paterson 🔨	3	0	0	2	0	0	2	0	7
(Japan) Yuta Matsumura	0	2	0	0	1	2	0	3	8

Sheet B	1	2	3	4	5	6	7	8	9	Final
(Alberta) Brendan Bottcher 🔨	1	0	1	1	2	0	0	0	1	6
(British Columbia) Tyler Tardi	0	2	0	0	0	2	0	1	0	5

==== Draw 7 ====
Thursday, April 25, 12:00 pm

Sheet A	1	2	3	4	5	6	7	8	9	Final
(Newfoundland and Labrador) Brad Gushue 🔨	2	0	0	1	0	2	0	1	0	6
(Ontario) John Epping	0	1	0	0	3	0	2	0	1	7

Sheet B	1	2	3	4	5	6	7	8	Final
(Scotland) Bruce Mouat 🔨	1	1	0	1	0	2	1	X	6
(Saskatchewan) Matt Dunstone	0	0	1	0	2	0	0	X	3

Sheet E	1	2	3	4	5	6	7	8	Final
(Alberta) Kevin Koe 🔨	1	0	0	3	0	4	X	X	8
(Switzerland) Yannick Schwaller	0	2	0	0	1	0	X	X	3

==== Draw 8 ====
Thursday, April 25, 4:00 pm

Sheet C	1	2	3	4	5	6	7	8	Final
(Manitoba) Team Carruthers 🔨	0	0	2	2	0	1	2	X	7
(British Columbia) Tyler Tardi	0	0	0	0	1	0	0	X	1

Sheet D	1	2	3	4	5	6	7	8	Final
(Scotland) Ross Paterson	2	0	1	0	0	1	0	0	4
(United States) Team Shuster 🔨	0	2	0	2	0	0	2	2	8

Sheet E	1	2	3	4	5	6	7	8	Final
(Ontario) Brad Jacobs	0	1	0	3	0	1	0	X	5
(Sweden) Niklas Edin 🔨	2	0	3	0	1	0	2	X	8

==== Draw 9 ====
Thursday, April 25, 8:00 pm

Sheet D	1	2	3	4	5	6	7	8	Final
(Saskatchewan) Kirk Muyres	0	1	0	1	1	0	2	0	5
(Switzerland) Yannick Schwaller 🔨	2	0	2	0	0	2	0	1	7

Sheet E	1	2	3	4	5	6	7	8	Final
(Alberta) Brendan Bottcher	2	1	0	3	0	0	1	2	9
(Scotland) Bruce Mouat 🔨	0	0	1	0	3	1	0	0	5

==== Draw 10 ====
Friday, April 26, 8:30 am

Sheet A	1	2	3	4	5	6	7	8	9	Final
(Saskatchewan) Matt Dunstone	0	1	0	2	0	2	0	3	1	9
(Manitoba) Team Carruthers 🔨	2	0	2	0	1	0	3	0	0	8

Sheet C	1	2	3	4	5	6	7	8	Final
(Sweden) Niklas Edin 🔨	1	0	1	0	2	0	1	X	5
(Japan) Yuta Matsumura	0	0	0	1	0	0	0	X	1

==== Draw 11 ====
Friday, April 26, 12:00 pm

Sheet B	1	2	3	4	5	6	7	8	Final
(Alberta) Kevin Koe	1	0	5	0	1	X	X	X	7
(Ontario) John Epping 🔨	0	1	0	1	0	X	X	X	2

Sheet C	1	2	3	4	5	6	7	8	Final
(Ontario) Brad Jacobs 🔨	2	0	2	1	0	4	X	X	9
(Scotland) Ross Paterson	0	2	0	0	1	0	X	X	3

Sheet D	1	2	3	4	5	6	7	8	Final
(Scotland) Bruce Mouat 🔨	0	1	0	0	2	0	1	2	6
(British Columbia) Tyler Tardi	1	0	1	0	0	2	0	0	4

==== Draw 12 ====
Friday, April 26, 4:00 pm

Sheet B	1	2	3	4	5	6	7	8	Final
(Sweden) Niklas Edin	1	0	2	0	0	3	0	2	8
(United States) Team Shuster 🔨	0	2	0	1	0	0	4	0	7

==== Draw 13 ====
Friday, April 26, 8:00 pm

Sheet B	1	2	3	4	5	6	7	8	Final
(Alberta) Brendan Bottcher 🔨	2	0	3	0	0	2	X	X	7
(Manitoba) Team Carruthers	0	1	0	1	0	0	X	X	2

Sheet C	1	2	3	4	5	6	7	8	Final
(Alberta) Kevin Koe	0	2	1	0	0	0	2	0	5
(Newfoundland and Labrador) Brad Gushue 🔨	1	0	0	2	2	1	0	1	7

Sheet D	1	2	3	4	5	6	7	8	Final
(Ontario) John Epping 🔨	1	0	0	0	0	0	2	X	3
(Saskatchewan) Kirk Muyres	0	1	1	0	1	1	0	X	4

=== Tiebreaker ===
Saturday, April 27, 8:30 am

Sheet D	1	2	3	4	5	6	7	8	Final
(Ontario) Brad Jacobs 🔨	0	0	1	0	3	1	1	X	6
(Saskatchewan) Matt Dunstone	0	0	0	3	0	0	0	X	3

Player percentages
(Ontario) Team Jacobs		(Saskatchewan) Team Dunstone	
Ryan Harnden	75%	Dustin Kidby	93%
E.J. Harnden	84%	Catlin Schneider	85%
Ryan Fry	80%	Braeden Moskowy	84%
Brad Jacobs	93%	Matt Dunstone	65%
Total	83%	Total	82%

=== Playoffs ===
Quarterfinals
1	(Alberta) Brendan Bottcher	4
8	(Ontario) Brad Jacobs	1
4	(United States) Team Shuster	4
5	(Scotland) Bruce Mouat	8
2	(Sweden) Niklas Edin	9
7	(Ontario) John Epping	7
3	(Alberta) Kevin Koe	6
6	(Newfoundland and Labrador) Brad Gushue	3

Semifinals
1	(Alberta) Brendan Bottcher	7
5	(Scotland) Bruce Mouat	2
2	(Sweden) Niklas Edin	5
3	(Alberta) Kevin Koe	6

Final
1	(Alberta) Brendan Bottcher	6
3	(Alberta) Kevin Koe	5

==== Quarterfinals ====
Saturday, April 27, 4:00 pm

Sheet A	1	2	3	4	5	6	7	8	9	Final
(Sweden) Niklas Edin 🔨	1	0	3	0	1	0	2	0	2	9
(Ontario) John Epping	0	1	0	3	0	2	0	1	0	7

Player percentages
(Sweden) Team Edin		(Ontario) Team Epping	
Christoffer Sundgren	95%	Craig Savill	98%
Rasmus Wranå	91%	Brent Laing	87%
Jim Cotter	89%	Matt Camm	81%
Niklas Edin	99%	John Epping	87%
Total	93%	Total	88%

Sheet B	1	2	3	4	5	6	7	8	Final
(Alberta) Brendan Bottcher 🔨	1	0	0	2	0	1	0	X	4
(Ontario) Brad Jacobs	0	1	0	0	0	0	0	X	1

Player percentages
(Alberta) Team Bottcher		(Ontario) Team Jacobs	
Karrick Martin	85%	Ryan Harnden	91%
Brad Thiessen	86%	E.J. Harnden	79%
Darren Moulding	99%	Ryan Fry	76%
Brendan Bottcher	85%	Brad Jacobs	79%
Total	89%	Total	81%

Sheet C	1	2	3	4	5	6	7	8	Final
(Alberta) Kevin Koe	0	2	0	0	1	0	3	X	6
(Newfoundland and Labrador) Brad Gushue 🔨	1	0	1	0	0	1	0	X	3

Player percentages
(Alberta) Team Koe		(Newfoundland and Labrador) Team Gushue	
Ben Hebert	80%	Geoff Walker	78%
Colton Flasch	87%	Colton Lott	83%
B.J. Neufeld	100%	Mark Nichols	81%
Kevin Koe	90%	Brad Gushue	86%
Total	89%	Total	82%

Sheet D	1	2	3	4	5	6	7	8	Final
(United States) Team Shuster	0	0	2	0	2	0	0	0	4
(Scotland) Bruce Mouat 🔨	2	1	0	1	0	1	0	3	8

Player percentages
(United States) Team Shuster		(Scotland) Team Mouat	
John Landsteiner	81%	Hammy McMillan Jr.	91%
Matt Hamilton	93%	Bobby Lammie	86%
Chris Plys	79%	Grant Hardie	92%
John Morris	84%	Bruce Mouat	74%
Total	84%	Total	86%

==== Semifinals ====
Saturday, April 27, 8:00 pm

Sheet A	1	2	3	4	5	6	7	8	Final
(Alberta) Brendan Bottcher 🔨	2	0	3	2	0	X	X	X	7
(Scotland) Bruce Mouat	0	1	0	0	1	X	X	X	2

Player percentages
(Alberta) Team Bottcher		(Scotland) Team Mouat	
Karrick Martin	97%	Hammy McMillan Jr.	86%
Brad Thiessen	74%	Bobby Lammie	64%
Darren Moulding	78%	Grant Hardie	61%
Brendan Bottcher	80%	Bruce Mouat	70%
Total	85%	Total	70%

Sheet D	1	2	3	4	5	6	7	8	Final
(Sweden) Niklas Edin 🔨	0	2	0	0	2	0	1	0	5
(Alberta) Kevin Koe	0	0	2	1	0	1	0	2	6

Player percentages
(Sweden) Team Edin		(Alberta) Team Koe	
Christoffer Sundgren	87%	Ben Hebert	97%
Rasmus Wranå	88%	Colton Flasch	80%
Jim Cotter	77%	B.J. Neufeld	81%
Niklas Edin	80%	Kevin Koe	77%
Total	83%	Total	84%

==== Final ====
Sunday, April 28, 10:00 am

Sheet C	1	2	3	4	5	6	7	8	9	Final
(Alberta) Brendan Bottcher 🔨	0	3	0	0	2	0	0	0	1	6
(Alberta) Kevin Koe	1	0	0	2	0	1	0	1	0	5

Player percentages
(Alberta) Team Bottcher		(Alberta) Team Koe	
Karrick Martin	88%	Ben Hebert	84%
Brad Thiessen	91%	Colton Flasch	88%
Darren Moulding	86%	B.J. Neufeld	77%
Brendan Bottcher	84%	Kevin Koe	81%
Total	87%	Total	83%

== Women ==
=== Teams ===
The teams are listed as follows:

Skip	Third	Second	Lead	Alternate	Locale
Chelsea Carey	Sarah Wilkes	Dana Ferguson	Rachel Brown		Calgary, Alberta
Kerri Einarson	Val Sweeting	Shannon Birchard	Briane Meilleur		Gimli, Manitoba
Laura Walker (Note: Laura Walker replaced Team Flaxey's skip, Allison Flaxey, for this event.)	Kate Cameron	Taylor McDonald	Raunora Westcott		Winnipeg, Manitoba
Eve Muirhead (Note: Eve Muirhead replaced Team Hasselborg's skip, Anna Hasselborg, who was competing in the 2019 World Mixed Doubles Curling Championship.)	Sara McManus	Agnes Knochenhauer	Sofia Mabergs		Sundbyberg, Sweden
Rachel Homan	Emma Miskew	Jolene Campbell (Note: Jolene Campbell replaced Team Homan's second, Joanne Courtney, who was pregnant.)	Lisa Weagle		Ottawa, Ontario
Jennifer Jones	Kaitlyn Lawes	Lori Olson-Johns (Note: Lori Olson-Johns replaced Team Jones' second, Jocelyn Peterman, who was competing in the 2019 World Mixed Doubles Curling Championship.)	Dawn McEwen		Winnipeg, Manitoba
Kim Min-ji	Kim Hye-rin	Yang Tae-i	Kim Su-jin		Chuncheon, South Korea
Alina Kovaleva	Anastasia Bryzgalova	Galina Arsenkina	Ekaterina Kuzmina	Uliana Vasilyeva	Saint-Petersburg, Russia
Vlada Rumyanceva	Daria Morozova	Irina Riazanova	Vera Tiuliakova		Moscow, Russia
Casey Scheidegger	Cary-Anne McTaggart	Jessie Haughian	Kristie Moore		Lethbridge, Alberta
Robyn Silvernagle	Stefanie Lawton	Jessie Hunkin	Kara Thevenot		North Battleford, Saskatchewan
Jamie Sinclair	Sarah Anderson	Vicky Persinger (Note: Vicky Persinger replaced Team Sinclair's lead, Monica Walker, who retired. She played second, with Taylor Anderson playing lead.)	Taylor Anderson		Chaska, United States
Briar Hürlimann (fourth)	Elena Stern (skip)	Lisa Gisler	Céline Koller		Brig, Switzerland
Alina Pätz (fourth)	Silvana Tirinzoni (skip)	Esther Neuenschwander	Melanie Barbezat		Aarau, Switzerland
Isabella Wranå	Jennie Wåhlin	Almida de Val	Fanny Sjöberg		Stockholm, Sweden

=== Round-robin standings ===
Final round-robin standings

Key
Teams to playoffs
Teams to tiebreakers

Pool A	W	L	PF	PA	SO
(Ontario) Rachel Homan	4	0	30	14	14.10
(Alberta) Chelsea Carey	2	2	18	23	170.30
(United States) Jamie Sinclair	2	2	22	19	197.50
(Sweden) Isabella Wranå	1	3	19	23	
(South Korea) Kim Min-ji	1	3	19	28	278.20

Pool B	W	L	PF	PA	SO
(Sweden) Team Hasselborg	3	1	25	17	21.70
(Saskatchewan) Robyn Silvernagle	3	1	27	21	210.50
(Manitoba) Team Flaxey	2	2	23	26	75.80
(Manitoba) Jennifer Jones	2	2	20	22	243.50
(Switzerland) Elena Stern	0	4	16	25	

Pool C	W	L	PF	PA	SO
(Manitoba) Kerri Einarson	3	1	24	16	45.70
(Switzerland) Silvana Tirinzoni	3	1	24	16	141.70
(Alberta) Casey Scheidegger	2	2	24	20	56.30
(Russia) Alina Kovaleva	2	2	26	17	62.70
(Russia) Vlada Rumyanceva	0	4	9	38	

=== Round-robin results ===
All draw times are listed in Central Standard Time (UTC−6).

==== Draw 1 ====
Tuesday, April 23, 4:30 pm

Sheet A	1	2	3	4	5	6	7	8	Final
(Sweden) Team Hasselborg 🔨	0	2	0	1	0	2	2	X	7
(Manitoba) Team Flaxey	0	0	0	0	1	0	0	X	1

Sheet B	1	2	3	4	5	6	7	8	Final
(Manitoba) Kerri Einarson	0	3	0	2	0	0	0	1	6
(Russia) Alina Kovaleva 🔨	1	0	1	0	1	2	0	0	5

Sheet D	1	2	3	4	5	6	7	8	Final
(Ontario) Rachel Homan 🔨	0	0	1	2	1	0	2	X	6
(Sweden) Isabella Wranå	1	2	0	0	0	1	0	X	4

==== Draw 2 ====
Tuesday, April 23, 8:00 pm

Sheet A	1	2	3	4	5	6	7	8	Final
(Switzerland) Silvana Tirinzoni	0	2	1	0	2	1	0	2	8
(Russia) Vlada Rumyanceva 🔨	1	0	0	2	0	0	2	0	5

Sheet B	1	2	3	4	5	6	7	8	Final
(Saskatchewan) Robyn Silvernagle 🔨	0	2	1	2	0	0	1	X	6
(Switzerland) Elena Stern	0	0	0	0	2	0	0	X	2

Sheet D	1	2	3	4	5	6	7	8	Final
(South Korea) Kim Min-ji	0	3	0	0	0	0	X	X	3
(United States) Jamie Sinclair 🔨	3	0	3	1	1	1	X	X	9

==== Draw 3 ====
Wednesday, April 24, 12:00 pm

Sheet A	1	2	3	4	5	6	7	8	Final
(Manitoba) Jennifer Jones	0	1	1	2	0	0	0	1	5
(Switzerland) Elena Stern 🔨	2	0	0	0	0	1	1	0	4

==== Draw 4 ====
Wednesday, April 24, 4:00 pm

Sheet A	1	2	3	4	5	6	7	8	Final
(Alberta) Casey Scheidegger 🔨	2	0	0	1	0	0	1	X	4
(Russia) Alina Kovaleva	0	0	1	0	5	1	0	X	7

Sheet B	1	2	3	4	5	6	7	8	Final
(Ontario) Rachel Homan	0	3	0	3	0	2	X	X	8
(United States) Jamie Sinclair 🔨	1	0	1	0	1	0	X	X	3

Sheet C	1	2	3	4	5	6	7	8	Final
(Alberta) Chelsea Carey	0	1	0	0	1	1	1	2	6
(Sweden) Isabella Wranå 🔨	3	0	1	1	0	0	0	0	5

Sheet E	1	2	3	4	5	6	7	8	Final
(Manitoba) Kerri Einarson 🔨	2	1	1	1	0	2	X	X	7
(Russia) Vlada Rumyanceva	0	0	0	0	1	0	X	X	1

==== Draw 5 ====
Wednesday, April 24, 8:00 pm

Sheet C	1	2	3	4	5	6	7	8	Final
(Saskatchewan) Robyn Silvernagle	0	2	0	1	1	0	0	X	4
(Manitoba) Team Flaxey 🔨	2	0	3	0	0	3	3	X	11

Sheet D	1	2	3	4	5	6	7	8	Final
(Sweden) Team Hasselborg 🔨	2	0	2	0	1	1	0	1	7
(Manitoba) Jennifer Jones	0	2	0	2	0	0	1	0	5

==== Draw 6 ====
Thursday, April 25, 8:30 am

Sheet C	1	2	3	4	5	6	7	8	Final
(Russia) Alina Kovaleva 🔨	5	2	0	5	X	X	X	X	12
(Russia) Vlada Rumyanceva	0	0	1	0	X	X	X	X	1

Sheet D	1	2	3	4	5	6	7	8	Final
(Switzerland) Silvana Tirinzoni	0	0	1	0	0	1	1	0	3
(Alberta) Casey Scheidegger 🔨	2	1	0	0	1	0	0	2	6

Sheet E	1	2	3	4	5	6	7	8	Final
(United States) Jamie Sinclair 🔨	2	0	0	0	2	0	2	X	6
(Sweden) Isabella Wranå	0	1	1	0	0	1	0	X	3

==== Draw 7 ====
Thursday, April 25, 12:00 pm

Sheet C	1	2	3	4	5	6	7	8	Final
(Ontario) Rachel Homan 🔨	2	0	2	0	1	1	0	2	8
(South Korea) Kim Min-ji	0	1	0	1	0	0	2	0	4

Sheet D	1	2	3	4	5	6	7	8	Final
(Switzerland) Elena Stern	0	0	2	0	1	0	4	0	7
(Manitoba) Team Flaxey 🔨	0	3	0	2	0	3	0	1	9

==== Draw 8 ====
Thursday, April 25, 4:00 pm

Sheet A	1	2	3	4	5	6	7	8	Final
(Alberta) Chelsea Carey	0	0	0	1	1	0	1	2	5
(United States) Jamie Sinclair 🔨	0	0	3	0	0	1	0	0	4

Sheet B	1	2	3	4	5	6	7	8	Final
(Switzerland) Silvana Tirinzoni	1	0	0	0	0	3	2	X	6
(Russia) Alina Kovaleva 🔨	0	0	0	1	1	0	0	X	2

==== Draw 9 ====
Thursday, April 25, 8:00 pm

Sheet A	1	2	3	4	5	6	7	8	Final
(Manitoba) Jennifer Jones 🔨	0	3	3	0	0	2	X	X	8
(Manitoba) Team Flaxey	1	0	0	1	0	0	X	X	2

Sheet B	1	2	3	4	5	6	7	8	Final
(Manitoba) Kerri Einarson 🔨	0	3	0	0	2	1	2	X	8
(Alberta) Casey Scheidegger	1	0	1	1	0	0	0	X	3

Sheet C	1	2	3	4	5	6	7	8	Final
(Sweden) Team Hasselborg 🔨	2	0	2	0	2	0	0	X	6
(Saskatchewan) Robyn Silvernagle	0	3	0	3	0	1	1	X	8

==== Draw 10 ====
Thursday, April 26, 8:30 am

Sheet B	1	2	3	4	5	6	7	8	Final
(Alberta) Chelsea Carey 🔨	1	0	2	0	1	0	0	X	4
(South Korea) Kim Min-ji	0	2	0	2	0	2	1	X	7

==== Draw 11 ====
Thursday, April 26, 12:00 am

Sheet A	1	2	3	4	5	6	7	8	Final
(Sweden) Team Hasselborg 🔨	2	0	0	1	1	0	1	X	5
(Switzerland) Elena Stern	0	0	1	0	0	2	0	X	3

Sheet E	1	2	3	4	5	6	7	8	Final
(Alberta) Casey Scheidegger 🔨	4	0	0	3	4	X	X	X	11
(Russia) Vlada Rumyanceva	0	1	1	0	0	X	X	X	2

==== Draw 12 ====
Thursday, April 26, 4:00 pm

Sheet A	1	2	3	4	5	6	7	8	Final
(South Korea) Kim Min-ji 🔨	0	0	0	2	1	0	2	0	5
(Sweden) Isabella Wranå	1	1	1	0	0	2	0	2	7

Sheet C	1	2	3	4	5	6	7	8	Final
(Switzerland) Silvana Tirinzoni	1	1	0	3	0	1	1	X	7
(Manitoba) Kerri Einarson 🔨	0	0	1	0	2	0	0	X	3

Sheet D	1	2	3	4	5	6	7	8	Final
(Ontario) Rachel Homan 🔨	1	0	4	1	0	2	X	X	8
(Alberta) Chelsea Carey	0	1	0	0	2	0	X	X	3

Sheet E	1	2	3	4	5	6	7	8	Final
(Manitoba) Jennifer Jones 🔨	0	1	0	0	1	0	X	X	2
(Saskatchewan) Robyn Silvernagle	3	0	1	1	0	4	X	X	9

=== Tiebreakers ===
Thursday, April 26, 8:00 pm

Sheet A	1	2	3	4	5	6	7	8	9	Final
(Russia) Alina Kovaleva 🔨	1	0	2	0	0	0	3	0	3	9
(United States) Jamie Sinclair	0	1	0	0	1	3	0	1	0	6

Player percentages
(Russia) Team Kovaleva		(United States) Team Sinclair	
Ekaterina Kuzmina	81%	Taylor Anderson	68%
Uliana Vasilyeva	62%	Vicky Persinger	58%
Anastasia Bryzgalova	82%	Sarah Anderson	51%
Alina Kovaleva	66%	Jamie Sinclair	62%
Total	73%	Total	60%

Sheet E	1	2	3	4	5	6	7	8	Final
(Alberta) Casey Scheidegger 🔨	0	2	2	0	0	0	2	0	6
(Manitoba) Jennifer Jones	1	0	0	2	1	1	0	2	7

Player percentages
(Alberta) Team Scheidegger		(Manitoba) Team Jones	
Kristie Moore	87%	Dawn McEwen	91%
Jessie Haughian	85%	Lori Olson-Johns	81%
Cary-Anne McTaggart	93%	Kaitlyn Lawes	71%
Casey Scheidegger	77%	Jennifer Jones	69%
Total	86%	Total	78%

Friday, April 27, 8:30 am

Sheet C	1	2	3	4	5	6	7	8	9	Final
(Manitoba) Team Flaxey	0	3	0	1	0	0	2	0	3	9
(Alberta) Chelsea Carey 🔨	0	0	1	0	2	2	0	1	0	6

Player percentages
(Manitoba) Team Flaxey		(Alberta) Team Carey	
Raunora Westcott	84%	Rachelle Brown	88%
Taylor McDonald	84%	Dana Ferguson	79%
Kate Cameron	80%	Sarah Wilkes	82%
Laura Walker	73%	Chelsea Carey	85%
Total	80%	Total	84%

=== Playoffs ===
Quarterfinals
1	(Ontario) Rachel Homan	6
8	(Manitoba) Jennifer Jones	3
4	(Switzerland) Silvana Tirinzoni	4
5	(Saskatchewan) Robyn Silvernagle	3
2	(Sweden) Team Hasselborg	8
7	(Manitoba) Team Flaxey	2
3	(Manitoba) Kerri Einarson	8
6	(Russia) Alina Kovaleva	6

Semifinals
1	(Ontario) Rachel Homan	4
4	(Switzerland) Silvana Tirinzoni	5
2	(Sweden) Team Hasselborg	4
3	(Manitoba) Kerri Einarson	5

Final
4	(Switzerland) Silvana Tirinzoni	6
3	(Manitoba) Kerri Einarson	3

==== Quarterfinals ====
Saturday, April 27, 12:00 pm

Sheet A	1	2	3	4	5	6	7	8	Final
(Sweden) Team Hasselborg 🔨	3	0	4	0	0	1	X	X	8
(Manitoba) Team Flaxey	0	1	0	1	0	0	X	X	2

Player percentages
(Sweden) Team Hasselborg		(Manitoba) Team Flaxey	
Sofia Mabergs	96%	Raunora Westcott	79%
Agnes Knochenhauer	100%	Taylor McDonald	67%
Sara McManus	100%	Kate Cameron	50%
Eve Muirhead	96%	Laura Walker	66%
Total	98%	Total	65%

Sheet B	1	2	3	4	5	6	7	8	Final
(Manitoba) Kerri Einarson 🔨	0	1	0	1	1	0	3	2	8
(Russia) Alina Kovaleva	1	0	2	0	0	3	0	0	6

Player percentages
(Manitoba) Team Einarson		(Russia) Team Kovaleva	
Briane Meilleur	83%	Ekaterina Kuzmina	81%
Shannon Birchard	76%	Galina Arsenkina	73%
Val Sweeting	75%	Anastasia Bryzgalova	70%
Kerri Einarson	71%	Alina Kovaleva	70%
Total	76%	Total	73%

Sheet C	1	2	3	4	5	6	7	8	Final
(Switzerland) Silvana Tirinzoni 🔨	1	0	0	1	0	1	0	1	4
(Saskatchewan) Robyn Silvernagle	0	1	0	0	1	0	1	0	3

Player percentages
(Switzerland) Team Tirinzoni		(Saskatchewan) Team Silvernagle	
Melanie Barbezat	85%	Kara Thevenot	89%
Esther Neuenschwander	96%	Jessie Hunkin	77%
Silvana Tirinzoni	90%	Stefanie Lawton	73%
Alina Pätz	83%	Robyn Silvernagle	81%
Total	89%	Total	80%

Sheet D	1	2	3	4	5	6	7	8	Final
(Ontario) Rachel Homan 🔨	0	2	0	2	0	2	0	X	6
(Manitoba) Jennifer Jones	0	0	1	0	0	0	2	X	3

Player percentages
(Ontario) Team Homan		(Manitoba) Team Jones	
Lisa Weagle	92%	Dawn McEwen	88%
Jolene Campbell	79%	Lori Olson-Johns	90%
Emma Miskew	88%	Kaitlyn Lawes	75%
Rachel Homan	89%	Jennifer Jones	86%
Total	87%	Total	84%

==== Semifinals ====
Saturday, April 27, 8:00 pm

Sheet B	1	2	3	4	5	6	7	8	Final
(Ontario) Rachel Homan 🔨	1	0	0	1	0	0	1	1	4
(Switzerland) Silvana Tirinzoni	0	1	1	0	2	1	0	0	5

Player percentages
(Ontario) Team Homan		(Switzerland) Team Tirinzoni	
Lisa Weagle	83%	Melanie Barbezat	89%
Jolene Campbell	75%	Esther Neuenschwander	74%
Emma Miskew	73%	Silvana Tirinzoni	90%
Rachel Homan	78%	Alina Pätz	97%
Total	77%	Total	87%

Sheet C	1	2	3	4	5	6	7	8	Final
(Sweden) Team Hasselborg	0	1	0	2	0	0	1	0	4
(Manitoba) Kerri Einarson 🔨	0	0	1	0	1	0	0	3	5

Player percentages
(Sweden) Team Hasselborg		(Manitoba) Team Einarson	
Sofia Mabergs	90%	Briane Meilleur	89%
Agnes Knochenhauer	79%	Shannon Birchard	79%
Sara McManus	78%	Val Sweeting	78%
Eve Muirhead	79%	Kerri Einarson	77%
Total	81%	Total	81%

==== Final ====
Sunday, April 28, 2:00 pm

Sheet C	1	2	3	4	5	6	7	8	Final
(Switzerland) Silvana Tirinzoni 🔨	1	0	1	0	2	0	1	1	6
(Manitoba) Kerri Einarson	0	1	0	1	0	1	0	0	3

Player percentages
(Switzerland) Team Tirinzoni		(Manitoba) Team Einarson	
Melanie Barbezat	85%	Briane Meilleur	92%
Esther Neuenschwander	70%	Shannon Birchard	80%
Silvana Tirinzoni	62%	Val Sweeting	83%
Alina Pätz	80%	Kerri Einarson	61%
Total	74%	Total	79%
