= Anastasia Moskaleva =

Russian curler (born 1994)

- Curler
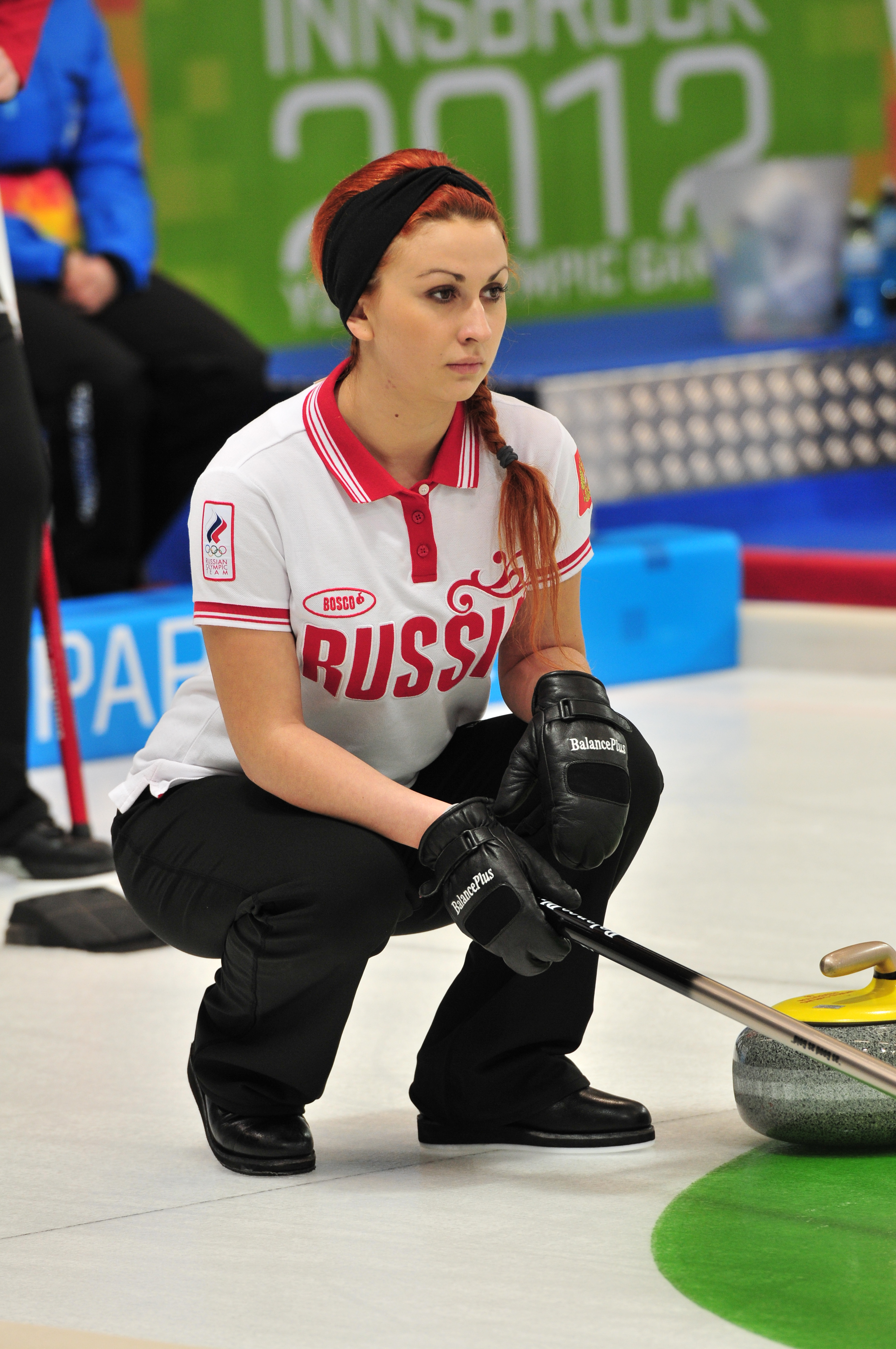
- Born: 20 April 1994 (age 32); Dmitrov, Moscow Oblast

Team
- Skip: Olga Kotelnikova
- Fourth: Anastasia Moskaleva
- Second: Daria Morozova
- Lead: Daria Styoksova
- Alternate: Daria Panchenko
- Mixed doubles partner: Alexander Eremin

Curling career
- Member Association: Russia
- World Mixed Doubles Championship: 2 (2019, 2021)
- European Championship: 1 (2018)
- Other appearances: World Mixed Curling Championship: 1 (2018), World Junior Curling Championships: 2 (2014, 2015), Winter Youth Olympics: 1 (2012)
Medal record
Curling
Representing Russia
World Junior Curling Championships
Bronze medal – third place	2014 Flims
World Mixed Curling Championship
Bronze medal – third place	2018 Kelowna

Anastasia Igorevna Moskaleva (Russian: Анастаси́я И́горевна Москалёва; born 20 April 1994 in Dmitrov, Moscow Oblast) is a Russian female curler.

== Awards ==
- Master of Sports of Russia (curling, 2014).
- World Mixed Curling Championship: bronze (2018).
- Russian Mixed Curling Championship: silver (2020), bronze (2012, 2013).
- Russian Mixed Doubles Curling Championship: gold (2018, 2019, 2020).
- World Junior Curling Championships: bronze (2014).

== Teams and events ==
=== Women's ===
Season	Skip	Third	Second	Lead	Alternate	Coach	Events
2008–09	Marina Kalinina	Anna Gretskaya	Anastasia Moskaleva	Marina Verenich	Nika Cherednikova		RWCCh 2009 (15th)
2009–10	Anastasia Moskaleva	Marina Verenich	Elena Ushakova	Daria Morozova	Anna Yagodkina		RWCCh 2010 (13th)
2010–11	Marina Kalinina	Anastasia Moskaleva	Marina Verenich	Daria Morozova	Marina Vdovina (RWCCup); Elena Ushakova (RWCCh)		RWCCup 2010 (14th); RWCCh 2011 (12th)
2011–12	Anastasia Moskaleva	Daria Morozova	Marina Verenich	Marina Vdovina	Marina Kalinina		RWCCup 2011 (7th)
2012–13	Anastasia Moskaleva	?	?	?			RWCCup 2012 (silver)
2013–14	Anastasia Moskaleva	Marina Verenich	Daria Morozova	Olga Kotelnikova			RWCCup 2013 (4th)
2013–14	Yulia Portunova (fourth)	Alina Kovaleva (skip)	Uliana Vasilyeva	Anastasia Bryzgalova	Anastasia Moskaleva	Anders Kraupp, Irina Kolesnikova	WJCC 2014 (bronze)
2014–15	Evgeniya Demkina	Ekaterina Kuzmina	Uliana Vasilyeva	Anastasia Moskaleva	Irina Kolesnikova		
2014–15	Uliana Vasilyeva (fourth)	Maria Baksheeva	Ekaterina Kuzmina	Evgeniya Demkina (skip)	Anastasia Moskaleva	Anders Kraupp	WJCC 2015 (7th)
2016–17	Daria Morozova	Anastasia Moskaleva	Ksenia Shevchuk	Olga Kotelnikova			RWCCup 2016 (11th)
2016–17	Daria Morozova	Anastasia Moskaleva	Olga Kotelnikova	Daria Styoksova		Tatiana Lukina	RWCCh 2017 (6th)
2017–18	Daria Morozova	Anastasia Moskaleva	Olga Kotelnikova	Daria Styoksova	Alexandra Kardapoltseva		RWCCh 2018 (8th)
2020–21	Anastasia Moskaleva (fourth)	Olga Kotelnikova (skip)	Daria Morozova	Daria Styoksova	Daria Panchenko	Tatiana Lukina, Marina Verenich	RWCCup 2020 (11th); RWCCh 2020 (bronze)

=== Mixed ===
Season	Skip	Third	Second	Lead	Alternate	Coach	Events
2008–09	Vladislav Chernobaev	Anna Gretskaya	Mikhail Vaskov	Anastasia Moskaleva			RMxCCh 2009 (11th)
2010–11	Mikhail Vaskov	Anastasia Moskaleva	Alexandr Korshunov	Marina Verenich	Alexey Kulikov		RMxCCh 2011 (7th)
2011–12	Mikhail Vaskov	Anastasia Moskaleva	Alexandr Korshunov	Marina Verenich		Anna Gretskaya (WYOG)	WYOG 2012 (11th); RMxCCh 2012 (bronze)
2012–13	Mikhail Vaskov	Anastasia Moskaleva	Alexandr Korshunov	Marina Verenich			RMxCCh 2013 (bronze)
2013–14	Mikhail Vaskov	Anastasia Moskaleva	Alexandr Korshunov	Marina Verenich			RMxCCh 2014 (11th)
2014–15	Mikhail Vaskov	Anastasia Moskaleva	Alexandr Korshunov	Marina Verenich			RMxCCup 2014 (11th)
2016–17	Mikhail Vaskov	Anastasia Moskaleva	Alexey Kulikov	Daria Styoksova			RMxCCh 2017 (7th)
2017–18	Kirill Savenkov	Anastasia Moskaleva	Petr Kuznetsov	Daria Styoksova			RMxCCup 2017 (9th)
2017–18	Anastasia Moskaleva	Mikhail Vaskov	Olga Kotelnikova	Alexey Kulikov			RMxCCh 2018 (9th)
2018–19	Alexander Eremin	Maria Komarova	Daniil Goriachev	Anastasia Moskaleva		Vasily Gudin	WMxCC 2018 (bronze)
2020–21	Alexander Eremin	Anastasia Moskaleva	Alexey Tuzov	Daria Morozova			RMxCCh 2020 (silver)

=== Mixed doubles ===
Season	Male	Female	Coach	Events
2011–12	(Japan); Tsukasa Horigome	(Russia); Anastasia Moskaleva		WYOG 2012 (5th)
2012–13	Mikhail Vaskov	Anastasia Moskaleva		RMDCCup 2012 (9th); RMDCCh 2013 (5th)
2013–14	Mikhail Vaskov	Anastasia Moskaleva		RMDCCup 2013 (5th); RMDCCh 2014 (5th)
2014–15	Mikhail Vaskov	Anastasia Moskaleva		RMDCCh 2015 (9th)
2015–16	Alexander Eremin	Anastasia Moskaleva		RMDCCup 2015 (6th)
2015–16	Alexey Tuzov	Anastasia Moskaleva		RMDCCh 2016 (5th)
2016–17	Dmitry Antipov	Anastasia Moskaleva		RMDCCup 2016 (5th)
2016–17	Mikhail Vaskov	Anastasia Moskaleva		RMDCCh 2017 (13th)
2017–18	Alexander Eremin	Anastasia Moskaleva		RMDCCh 2018 (gold)
2018–19	Alexander Eremin	Anastasia Moskaleva	Vasily Gudin (RMDCCh, CWC, WMDCC), Vasily Sobakin (WMDCC)	CWC/2 (7th); RMDCCh 2019 (gold); WMDCC 2019 (5th)
2019–20	Alexander Eremin	Anastasia Moskaleva		RMDCCh 2020 (gold)
2020–21	Alexander Eremin	Anastasia Moskaleva	Vasily Gudin; Dan Rafael	RMDCCh 2021 (silver); WMDCC 2021 (11th)
