= Russian Women's Curling Cup =

Russian women's curling tournament

- Established: 2007
- 2023 host city: Sochi
- 2023 arena: Iceberg Skating Palace
- 2023 champion: Saint Petersburg 1 (Alina Kovaleva)

The Russian Women's Curling Cup (Russian: Кубок России по кёрлингу среди женщин, Кубок России по кёрлингу среди женских команд) is the annual national women's curling tournament in Russia. It has been held annually since the 2007―2008 season, taking place in the first half of the curling season (from September to December) and usually lasts for five to six days. The tournament is organized by the Russian Curling Federation. As of 2021, the event consisted of sixteen teams participating in a preliminary round robin and a single-knockout playoff.

== Past champions ==
Year	Host	Winning Team	Runner-up Team	Bronze Team
2007	Moscow	Moscow; Olga Zharkova, Nkeirouka Ezekh, Anna Sidorova, Galina Arsenkina, alternate: Olga Zyablikova	EShVSM Moskvich 1 (Moscow); Liudmila Privivkova, Ekaterina Galkina, Margarita Fomina, Ilona Grishina, alternates: Maria Gorbokonj, Aleksandra Saitova	Moscow Oblast (Dmitrov); Tatiana Smirnova, Tatiana Lukina, Anastasia Skultan, Yulia Storozheva
2008	Moscow	EShVSM Moskvich 1 (Moscow); Liudmila Privivkova, Ekaterina Galkina, Margarita Fomina, Ekaterina Antonova	EShVSM Moskvich 3 (Moscow) (no team line-up in sources)	?
2009	Dmitrov	Moscow; Olga Zharkova, Kira Ezekh, Anna Sidorova, Galina Arsenkina, alternate: Olga Zyablikova	SKA 1 (Saint Petersburg); Yana Nekrasova, Natalia Evert, Yana Goloborodko, Svetlana Filchakova	EShVSM Moskvich 2 (Moscow); Daria Kozlova, Victoria Makarshina, Aleksandra Saitova, Anna Lobova, alternate: Julia Svetova
2010	Tver	EShVSM Moskvich 2 (Moscow); Liudmila Privivkova, Margarita Fomina, Ekaterina Antonova, Ekaterina Galkina	Moskvich (Moscow); Victoria Makarshina, Aleksandra Saitova, Anna Lobova, Nadezhda Lepezina	EShVSM Moskvich 1 (Moscow); Anna Sidorova, Nkeirouka Ezekh, Olga Zyablikova, Galina Arsenkina
2011	Dmitrov	Moskvich (Moscow); Anna Sidorova, Olga Zyablikova, Nkeirouka Ezekh, Galina Arsenkina	EShVSM Moskvich 1 (Moscow); Liudmila Privivkova, Margarita Fomina, Ekaterina Antonova, Ekaterina Galkina	SKA (Saint Petersburg); Yana Nekrasova, Natalia Evert, Svetlana Filchakova, Irina Kolesnikova
2012	Dmitrov	Team Moscow 2 Liudmila Privivkova	TsZVS Moscow Oblast 1 (Dmitrov); Anastasia Moskaleva	Team Moscow 1 Kira Ezekh
2013	Sochi	Adamant 2 (Saint Petersburg); Alina Kovaleva, Elena Efimova, Uliana Vasilyeva, Maria Komarova, alternate: Oksana Bogdanova	Albatros (Kaliningrad); Olga Zharkova, Yulia Portunova, Alisa Miroshnichenko, Julia Guzieva, alternate: Ekaterina Sharapova	Team Moscow 1 Liudmila Privivkova, Olga Zyablikova, Nkeirouka Ezekh, Alina Biktimirova, alternate: Anastasia Prokofieva
2014	Sochi	Moskvich 2 (Moscow); Evgeniya Demkina	Adamant 2 (Saint Petersburg); Victoria Moiseeva	Krasnodar Krai (Sochi); Olga Zharkova
2015	Sochi	Adamant 2 (Saint Petersburg); Victoria Moiseeva	Krasnodar Krai (Sochi); Olga Zharkova	Zekurion – Team Moscow; Alina Biktimirova
2016	Sochi	Krasnodar Krai 1 (Sochi); Olga Zharkova, Liudmila Privivkova, Julia Guzieva, Galina Arsenkina, alternate: Yulia Portunova	Zekurion-Moskvich (Moscow); Мария Борисова, Alina Biktimirova, Ekaterina Antonova, Anastasia Skultan	Vorobyovy Gory 1 (Moscow); Evgeniya Demkina, Vera Tiuliakova, Anastasia Prokofieva, Anastasia Beginina, alternate: Ravilya Iskakova
2017	Sochi	Moscow Oblast 2 (Dmitrov); Vlada Rumiantseva, Ksenia Shevchuk, Irina Riazanova, Anastasia Mishchenko, alternate: Anastasia Shustrova	Adamant 2 (Saint Petersburg); Victoria Moiseeva, Maria Baksheeva, Maria Duyunova, Arina Zasedateleva, alternate: Polina Bikker	Zekurion-Moskvich (Moscow); Alina Biktimirova, Yana Nekrasova, Ekaterina Antonova, Anastasia Skultan, alternate: Lolita Tretiak
2018	Krasnoyarsk	Adamant 1 (Saint Petersburg); Alina Kovaleva, Anastasia Bryzgalova, Uliana Vasilyeva, Ekaterina Kuzmina, alternate: Anastasia Danshina	Moskvich-Zekurion (Moscow); Ekaterina Galkina, Ekaterina Antonova, Anna Antonyuk, Anastasia Skultan, alternate: Rimma Shayafetdinova	Moscow Oblast 1 (Dmitrov); Olga Kotelnikova, Ksenia Shevchuk, Daria Panchenko, Daria Styoksova
2019	Sochi	UOR 2 (Saint Petersburg); Irina Nizovtseva, Nadezhda Beliakova, Arina Piantina, Daria Patrikeeva, alternate: Anastasia Kilchevskaya	Krasnodar Krai (Sochi); Liudmila Privivkova, Maria Ignatenko, Sophia Tkach, Irina Poletaeva, alternate: Polina Murzina	Adamant 2 (Saint Petersburg); Maria Ermeychuk, Anastasia Khalanskaya, Olga Antonova, Maria Drozdova, alternate: Aleksandra Kulumbekova
2020	Dmitrov	Saint Petersburg 1 Alina Kovaleva, Maria Komarova, Galina Arsenkina, Ekaterina Kuzmina, alternate: Vera Tiuliakova, coach: Anastasia Bryzgalova	Krasnodar Krai 1 (Sochi); Anna Sidorova, Yulia Portunova, Liudmila Privivkova, Maria Ignatenko, alternate: Sophia Tkach, coach: Sergei Belanov	Moscow Oblast 1 (Dmitrov); Vlada Rumiantseva, Irina Riazanova, Anastasia Mishchenko, Alexandra Kardapoltseva, alternate: Alina Lyotz, coaches: Tatiana Lukina, Marina Verenich
2021	Sochi	Saint Petersburg 2 Nkeirouka Ezekh, Diana Margarian, Olga Antonova, Anastasia Kilchevskaya, alternate: Alina Borodulina, coaches: Konstantin Zadvornov, Elena Ilinykh	Irkutsk Oblast - Komsomoll 1 Valeria Denisenko, Elizaveta Trukhina, Alina Fakhurtdinova, Elizaveta Kiselyova, alternate: Nina Polikarpova, coach: Anna Trukhina	Moskvich 2 (Moscow); Sophia Orazalina, Maria Tsebriy, Daria Tsvedanashvili, Anastasia Golitsyna, alternate: Alina Vasilyeva, coaches: Olga Andrianova, Dmitry Andrianov, Evgeny Arkhipov
2022	Samara	Saint Petersburg 2 Alina Kovaleva, Galina Arsenkina, Maria Komarova, Ekaterina Kuzmina, alternate: Vera Tiuliakova, coach: Anastasia Bryzgalova	UOR 2 - Saint Petersburg 4 Diana Margaryan, Valeria Miroshnichenko, Alina Borodulina, Anastasia Kilchevskaya, alternate: Arina Artamonova, coach: Petr Dron	Krasnodar Krai 2 (Sochi); Anna Sidorova, Maria Marchenkova, Victoria Enbaeva, Liudmila Privivkova, alternate: Sophia Tkach, coach: Efim Zhidelev
2023	Sochi	Saint Petersburg 1 Alina Kovaleva, Maria Komarova, Uliana Vasilyeva, Ekaterina Kuzmina, alternate: Anastasia Bryzgalova, coach: Anastasia Bryzgalova	Saint Petersburg 2 Diana Margaryan, Valeria Miroshnichenko, Alina Borodulina, Anastasia Kilchevskaya, alternate: Arina Artamonova, coach: Petr Dron	Komsomoll - Irkutsk Oblast; Elizaveta Trukhina, Nina Suvorova, Valeria Denisenko, Victoria Desova, alternate: Elizaveta Kiselyova, coach: Anna Trukhina
2024	Sochi	Saint Petersburg 1 Diana Margaryan, Alina Borodulina, Valeria Miroshnichenko, Anastasia Kilchevskaya, coach: Petr Dron	Novosibirsk Oblast; Aleksandra Stoyarosova, Irina Riazanova, Alexandra Moszherina, Victoria Sachkova, coach: Artem Shmakov	Krasnodar Krai 1 (Sochi); Olga Zharkova, Yulia Ermakova, Liudmila Privivkova, Julia Chemodanova, alternate: Irina Tkach, coaches: Efim Zhidelev, Dmitry Mironov
2025	Sochi	Komsomoll 1 - Irkutsk Oblast; Valeria Denisenko, Alina Fakhurtdinova,Elizaveta Trukhina, Elizaveta Kiselyova, alternate: Victoria Desova, coaches: Anna Trukhina, Andrey Dudov	Saint Petersburg 2 Diana Margaryan, Nkeirouka Ezekh, Valeria Miroshnichenko, Alina Borodulina, alternate: Anastasia Kilchevskaya, coach: Petr Dron	Saint Petersburg 1 Alina Kovaleva, Maria Komarova, Ekaterina Shabunova, Irina Nizovtseva, alternate: Olga Kiba, coach: Anastasia Bryzgalova

== See also ==
- Russian Curling Championships
- Russian Women's Curling Championship
- Russian Men's Curling Cup
- Russian Mixed Curling Cup
- Russian Mixed Doubles Curling Cup
- Russian Wheelchair Curling Cup
- Russian Wheelchair Mixed Doubles Curling Cup
