= 2020 Russian Women's Curling Cup =

- Host city: Dmitrov, Moscow Oblast
- Arena: Palace of figure skating and curling
- Dates: September 30 – October 6, 2020
- Winner: Saint Petersburg 1 (Alina Kovaleva)
- Curling club: Adamant CC, Saint Petersburg
- Skip: Alina Kovaleva
- Third: Maria Komarova
- Second: Galina Arsenkina
- Lead: Ekaterina Kuzmina
- Alternate: Vera Tyulyakova
- Coach: Anastasia Bryzgalova
- Finalist: Krasnodar Krai 1 (Sochi; Anna Sidorova)

The 2020 Russian Women's Curling Cup (Russian: Кубок России среди женских команд 2020) was held from September 30 to October 6, 2020, at the Palace of Figure Skating and Curling (Russian: Дворец фигурного катания и кёрлинга МУ СК «Дмитров») in Dmitrov, Moscow Oblast.

All games played were 8 ends.

All times are listed in Moscow Time (UTC+03:00)

== Teams ==
| Team | Locale | Skip | Third | Second | Lead | Alternate | Coach |
|---|---|---|---|---|---|---|---|
| (Irkutsk Oblast) Komsomoll 1 | Irkutsk | Elizaveta Trukhina | Nina Polikarpova | Valeria Denisenko | Alina Fakhurtdinova | | Anna Trukhina |
| Krasnodar Krai 1 | Sochi | Anna Sidorova | Yulia Portunova | Liudmila Privivkova | Maria Ignatenko | Sophia Tkach | Sergei Belanov |
| Moscow Oblast 1 | Dmitrov | Vlada Rumiantseva | Irina Riazanova | Anastasiia Mishchenko | Alexandra Kardapoltseva | Alina Lyotz | Tatiana Lukina, Marina Verenich |
| Moscow Oblast 2 | Dmitrov | Anastasia Moskaleva (Fourth) | Olga Kotelnikova (Skip) | Daria Morozova | Daria Styoksova | Daria Panchenko | Tatiana Lukina, Marina Verenich |
| Moscow Oblast 3 | Dmitrov | Anastasia Paramonova | Victoria Postnova | Alina Irzhanova | Ekaterina Ivanova | Alexandra Leonova | Tatiana Lukina, Marina Verenich |
| (Moscow) Moskvitch 2 | Moscow | Sophia Orazalina | Maria Tsebriy | Karina Kurak | Arina Rusina | Ekaterina Prytkova | Olga Andrianova, Dmitry Andrianov |
| (Moscow) Moskvitch 3 | Moscow | Ekaterina Teljnova | Tatiana Poblagueva | Nika Nikitina | Anastasia Petrova | Daria Kukushkina | Dmitry Andrianov, Evgeny Arkhipov |
| (Moscow) Moskvitch-Zekurion | Moscow | Alina Biktimirova | Ekaterina Antonova | Irina Belyayeva | Maria Arhipova | Marina Maleeva | Olga Andrianova, Alexandr Belyavsky |
| Novosibirsk Oblast | Novosibirsk | Aleksandra Stoyarosova | Ekaterina Kungurova | Aleksandra Moszherina | Tatiana Filyushova | | Artem Shmakov |
| Saint Petersburg 1 | Saint Petersburg | Alina Kovaleva | Maria Komarova | Galina Arsenkina | Ekaterina Kuzmina | Vera Tyulyakova | Anastasia Bryzgalova |
| Saint Petersburg 2 | Saint Petersburg | Anastasia Babarykina | Anastasia Belikova | Victoria Shtreker | Regina Bogdanova | Alexandra Antonova | Yana Garshina |
| Saint Petersburg 4 | Saint Petersburg | Maria Ermeychuk | Anastasia Khalanskaya | Nkeirouka Ezekh | Margarita Evdokimova | Maria Drozdova | Konstantin Zadvornov, Elena Ilinykh |
| Team Moscow | Moscow | Xeniya Novikova | Lolita Tretyak | Natalia Gubanova | Polina Tchernikh | Daria Tskhvedanashvili | Olga Andrianova, Dmitry Andrianov |
| (Saint Petersburg) UOR 2 | Saint Petersburg | Irina Nizovtseva | Arina Pyantina | Nadegda Belyakova | Alisa Shenefeldt | Anastasia Eksuzyan | Svetlana Yakovleva |
| (Moscow) Vorobyovy Gory | Moscow | Ekaterina Korolyova | Margarita Bavrina | Polina Aleksandrova | Victoria Kulikova | Taisia Levchenko | Roman Kutuzov |
| (Krasnoyarsk Krai) Yenisei | Krasnoyarsk | Anna Samoylik | Kristina Dudko | Anastasia Kosogor | Elena Komleva | | Anna Samoylik |

== Round-robin standings ==
Final round-robin standings

Key
| Teams to Playoffs |

| Group A | W | L |
|---|---|---|
| Saint Petersburg 1 (Kovaleva) | 7 | 0 |
| Saint Petersburg 4 (Ermeychuk) | 6 | 1 |
| (Irkutsk Oblast) Komsomoll 1 (Trukhina) | 4 | 3 |
| (Krasnoyarsk Krai) Yenisei (Samoylik) | 3 | 4 |
| Novosibirsk Oblast (Stoyarosova) | 3 | 4 |
| Moscow Oblast 2 (Kotelnikova) | 2 | 5 |
| Team Moscow (Novikova) | 2 | 5 |
| (Moscow) Moskvitch 2 (Orazalina) | 1 | 6 |

| Group B | W | L |
|---|---|---|
| Krasnodar Krai 1 (Sidorova) | 7 | 0 |
| Moscow Oblast 1 (Rumiantseva) | 6 | 1 |
| (Saint Petersburg) UOR 2 (Nizovtseva) | 5 | 2 |
| (Moscow) Moskvitch-Zekurion (Biktimirova) | 3 | 4 |
| Saint Petersburg 2 (Babarykina) | 2 | 5 |
| Moscow Oblast 3 (Paramonova) | 2 | 5 |
| (Moscow) Moskvitch 3 (Teljnova) | 2 | 5 |
| (Moscow) Vorobyovy Gory (Korolyova) | 1 | 6 |

== Round-robin results ==
Key
| Teams to Playoffs |

Group A

| | Team | Skip | А1 | А2 | А3 | А4 | А5 | А6 | А7 | А8 | Wins | Losses | Points | DSC (cm) | Place |
|---|---|---|---|---|---|---|---|---|---|---|---|---|---|---|---|
| А1 | Saint Petersburg 1 | Alina Kovaleva | * | 10:0 | 10:1 | 6:3 | 4:2 | 5:2 | 5:4 | 12:5 | 7 | 0 | 14 | 86,95 | 1 |
| А2 | (Krasnoyarsk Krai) Yenisei | Anna Samoylik | 0:10 | * | 6:3 | 8:5 | 6:4 | 5:9 | 4:7 | 2:6 | 3 | 4 | 10 | 90,94 | 5 |
| А3 | (Moscow) Moskvitch 2 | Sophia Orazalina | 1:10 | 3:6 | * | 3:4 | 5:3 | 4:5 | 2:6 | 2:3 | 1 | 6 | 8 | 68,77 | 8 |
| А4 | Team Moscow | Xeniya Novikova | 3:6 | 5:8 | 4:3 | * | 2:11 | 5:6 | 1:10 | 7:6 | 2 | 5 | 9 | 117,81 | 7 |
| А5 | Moscow Oblast 2 | Olga Kotelnikova | 2:4 | 4:6 | 3:5 | 11:2 | * | 5:8 | 6:2 | 1:6 | 2 | 5 | 9 | 82,36 | 6 |
| А6 | Saint Petersburg 4 | Maria Ermeychuk | 2:5 | 9:5 | 5:4 | 6:5 | 8:5 | * | 3:2 | 6:3 | 6 | 1 | 13 | 86,62 | 2 |
| А7 | (Irkutsk Oblast) Komsomoll 1 | Elizaveta Trukhina | 4:5 | 7:4 | 6:2 | 10:1 | 2:6 | 2:3 | * | 9:6 | 4 | 3 | 11 | 68,27 | 3 |
| А8 | Novosibirsk Oblast | Aleksandra Stoyarosova | 5:12 | 6:2 | 3:2 | 6:7 | 6:1 | 3:6 | 6:9 | * | 3 | 4 | 10 | 99,52 | 4 |

Group B

| | Team | Skip | B1 | B2 | B3 | B4 | B5 | B6 | B7 | B8 | Wins | Losses | Points | DSC (cm) | Place |
|---|---|---|---|---|---|---|---|---|---|---|---|---|---|---|---|
| B1 | (Moscow) Moskvitch 3 | Ekaterina Teljnova | * | 9:1 | 2:6 | 4:6 | 2:6 | 1:6 | 3:6 | 7:5 | 2 | 5 | 9 | 82,80 | 5 |
| B2 | Saint Petersburg 2 | Anastasia Babarykina | 1:9 | * | 5:6 | 3:11 | 7:6 | 1:11 | 2:8 | 6:4 | 2 | 5 | 9 | 87,78 | 6 |
| B3 | (Saint Petersburg) UOR 2 | Irina Nizovtseva | 6:2 | 6:5 | * | 4:9 | 8:2 | 6:8 | 8:5 | 4:3 | 5 | 2 | 12 | 76,03 | 3 |
| B4 | Moscow Oblast 1 | Vlada Rumiantseva | 6:4 | 11:3 | 9:4 | * | 10:5 | 4:5 | 11:8 | 9:1 | 6 | 1 | 13 | 69,66 | 2 |
| B5 | Moscow Oblast 3 | Anastasia Paramonova | 6:2 | 6:7 | 2:8 | 5:10 | * | 2:10 | 0:11 | 7:6 | 2 | 5 | 9 | 105,25 | 7 |
| B6 | Krasnodar Krai 1 | Anna Sidorova | 6:1 | 11:1 | 8:6 | 5:4 | 10:2 | * | 8:3 | 8:3 | 7 | 0 | 14 | 48,16 | 1 |
| B7 | (Moscow) Moskvitch-Zekurion | Alina Biktimirova | 6:3 | 8:2 | 5:8 | 8:11 | 11:0 | 3:8 | * | 4:6 | 3 | 4 | 10 | 94,88 | 4 |
| B8 | (Moscow) Vorobyovy Gory | Ekaterina Korolyova | 5:7 | 4:6 | 3:4 | 1:9 | 6:7 | 3:8 | 6:4 | * | 1 | 6 | 8 | 70,44 | 8 |

Points: 2 for win, 1 for loss, 0 for technical loss (did not start)

== Playoffs ==
Semifinals
A(1) | Saint Petersburg 1 (Kovaleva) | 11
B(2) | Moscow Oblast 1 (Rumiantseva) | 4
B(1) | Krasnodar Krai 1 (Sidorova) | 10
A(2) | Saint Petersburg 4 (Ermeychuk) | 3

Final
A(1) | Saint Petersburg 1 (Kovaleva) | 7
B(1) | Krasnodar Krai 1 (Sidorova) | 2
Third place game
B(2) | Moscow Oblast 1 (Rumiantseva) | 5
A(2) | Saint Petersburg 4 (Ermeychuk) | 4

=== Semifinals ===
Monday, October 5, 7:40 pm

| Sheet B | 1 | 2 | 3 | 4 | 5 | 6 | 7 | 8 | Final |
| Moscow Oblast 1 (Rumiantseva) | 0 | 2 | 1 | 0 | 1 | 0 | X | X | 4 |
| Saint Petersburg 1 (Kovaleva) 🔨 | 4 | 0 | 0 | 4 | 0 | 3 | X | X | 11 |

| Sheet C | 1 | 2 | 3 | 4 | 5 | 6 | 7 | 8 | Final |
| Krasnodar Krai 1 (Sidorova) | 4 | 3 | 0 | 0 | 3 | 0 | X | X | 10 |
| Saint Petersburg 4 (Ermeychuk) 🔨 | 0 | 0 | 1 | 1 | 0 | 1 | X | X | 3 |

=== Third place game ===
Tuesday, October 6, 10:00 am

| Sheet D | 1 | 2 | 3 | 4 | 5 | 6 | 7 | 8 | Final |
| Saint Petersburg 4 (Ermeychuk) | 0 | 1 | 0 | 1 | 0 | 0 | 2 | 0 | 4 |
| Moscow Oblast 1 (Rumiantseva) 🔨 | 0 | 0 | 2 | 0 | 0 | 2 | 0 | 1 | 5 |

=== Final ===
Tuesday, October 6, 10:00 am

| Sheet C | 1 | 2 | 3 | 4 | 5 | 6 | 7 | 8 | Final |
| Saint Petersburg 1 (Kovaleva) 🔨 | 1 | 0 | 0 | 2 | 1 | 0 | 3 | X | 7 |
| Krasnodar Krai 1 (Sidorova) | 0 | 1 | 0 | 0 | 0 | 1 | 0 | X | 2 |

== Final standings ==
| Place | Team | Skip | Games | Wins | Losses | Place after RR | DSC (cm) |
|---|---|---|---|---|---|---|---|
| 1st place, gold medalist(s) | Saint Petersburg 1 | Alina Kovaleva | 9 | 9 | 0 | 1 | 86,95 |
| 2nd place, silver medalist(s) | Krasnodar Krai 1 | Anna Sidorova | 9 | 8 | 1 | 1 | 48,16 |
| 3rd place, bronze medalist(s) | Moscow Oblast 1 | Vlada Rumiantseva | 9 | 7 | 2 | 2 | 69,66 |
| 4 | Saint Petersburg 4 | Maria Ermeychuk | 9 | 6 | 3 | 2 | 86,62 |
| 5 | (Irkutsk Oblast) Komsomoll 1 | Elizaveta Trukhina | 7 | 4 | 3 | 3 | 68,27 |
| 6 | (Moscow) UOR 2 | Irina Nizovtseva | 7 | 5 | 2 | 3 | 76,03 |
| 7 | (Moscow) Moskvitch-Zekurion | Alina Biktimirova | 7 | 3 | 4 | 4 | 94,88 |
| 8 | Novosibirsk Oblast | Aleksandra Stoyarosova | 7 | 3 | 4 | 4 | 99,52 |
| 9 | (Moscow) Moskvitch 3 | Ekaterina Teljnova | 7 | 2 | 5 | 5 | 82,80 |
| 10 | (Krasnoyarsk Krai) Yenisei | Anna Samoylik | 7 | 3 | 4 | 5 | 90,94 |
| 11 | Moscow Oblast 2 | Olga Kotelnikova | 7 | 2 | 5 | 6 | 82,36 |
| 12 | Saint Petersburg 2 | Anastasia Babarykina | 7 | 2 | 5 | 6 | 87,78 |
| 13 | Moscow Oblast 3 | Anastasia Paramonova | 7 | 2 | 5 | 7 | 105,25 |
| 14 | Team Moscow | Xeniya Novikova | 7 | 2 | 5 | 7 | 117,81 |
| 15 | (Moscow) Moskvitch 2 | Sophia Orazalina | 7 | 1 | 6 | 8 | 68,77 |
| 16 | (Moscow) Vorobyovy Gory | Ekaterina Korolyova | 7 | 1 | 6 | 8 | 70,44 |

== See also ==
- 2020 Russian Men's Curling Cup
