= Curling at the 2019 Winter Universiade =

2019 Winter Universiade at Yarygin Sports Palace

- Host city: Krasnoyarsk, Russia
- Arena: Ivan Yarygin Sports Palace
- Dates: 3–10 March
- Men's winner: Norway
- Skip: Magnus Ramsfjell
- Third: Martin Sesaker
- Second: Bendik Ramsfjell
- Lead: Gaute Nepstad
- Alternate: Rune Steen Hansen
- Finalist: Canada (Karsten Sturmay)
- Women's winner: Sweden
- Skip: Isabella Wranå
- Third: Jennie Wåhlin
- Second: Almida de Val
- Lead: Fanny Sjöberg
- Finalist: South Korea (Kim Min-ji)

Curling at the 2019 Winter Universiade was held at Ivan Yarygin Sports Palace from 3 to 10 March 2019.

== Medal summary ==
=== Medal table ===
Rank	Nation	Gold	Silver	Bronze	Total
1	Norway (NOR)	1	0	0	1
1	Sweden (SWE)	1	0	0	1
3	Canada (CAN)	0	1	0	1
3	South Korea (KOR)	0	1	0	1
5	Great Britain (GBR)	0	0	1	1
5	Russia (RUS)*	0	0	1	1
Totals (6 entries)		2	2	2	6

=== Medalists ===
Event	Gold	Silver	Bronze
Men	Norway (NOR); Magnus Ramsfjell; Martin Sesaker; Bendik Ramsfjell; Gaute Nepstad	Canada (CAN); Karsten Sturmay; Tristan Steinke; Chris Kennedy; Glenn Venance	Great Britain (GBR); Ross Whyte; Duncan McFadzean; Ryan McCormack; Robin McCall; Luke Carson
Women	Sweden (SWE); Isabella Wranå; Jennie Wåhlin; Almida de Val; Fanny Sjöberg	South Korea (KOR); Kim Min-ji; Kim Hye-rin; Yang Tae-i; Kim Su-jin	Russia (RUS); Maria Komarova; Uliana Vasileva; Anastasia Danshina; Ekaterina Kuzmina; Anna Venevtseva

== Men ==
=== Teams ===
Canada	China	Czech Republic	Great Britain	South Korea
Skip: Karsten Sturmay; Third: Tristan Steinke; Second: Chris Kennedy; Lead: Glenn Venance; Coach: Rob Krepps	Skip: Hu Chenwei; Third: Cai Kaifan; Second: Tao Zhiyu; Lead: Yu Yizhe; Alternate: Liu Huibin; Coach: Xu Xiaoming	Skip: Jaroslav Vedral; Third: Marek Černovský; Second: Kryštof Krupanský; Lead: Lukáš Klípa; Alternate: David Verner; Coach: Brad Askew	Skip: Ross Whyte; Third: Duncan McFadzean; Second: Ryan McCormack; Lead: Robin McCall; Alternate: Luke Carson; Coach: Greg Drummond	Skip: Lee Jeong-jae; Third: Hwang Hyeon-jun; Second: Jeong Byeong-jin; Lead: Lee Dong-hyeong; Coach: Lee Je-ho
Norway	Russia	Switzerland	Sweden	United States
Skip: Magnus Ramsfjell; Third: Martin Sesaker; Second: Bendik Ramsfjell; Lead: Gaute Nepstad; Coach: Rune Steen Hansen	Skip: Aleksandr Bystrov; Third: Daniil Goriachev; Second: Vadim Shvedov; Lead: Nikolai Cherednichenko; Alternate: Denis Islamov; Coach: Dmitry Melnikov	Skip: Yannick Schwaller; Third: Michael Brunner; Second: Romano Meier; Lead: Marcel Käufeler; Alternate: Simon Gloor; Coach: Pius Matter	Skip: Fredrik Nyman; Third: Rasmus Wranå; Second: Axel Sjöberg; Lead: Max Bäck; Coach: Olle Brudsten	Skip: Andrew Stopera; Third: Luc Violette; Second: Alex Fenson; Lead: Graem Fenson; Coach: Mark Lazar

(source:)

=== Round-robin standings ===
Final round-robin standings

Key
Teams to Playoffs

Country	Skip	W	L
Great Britain	Ross Whyte	7	2
Canada	Karsten Sturmay	6	3
Switzerland	Yannick Schwaller	6	3
Norway	Magnus Ramsfjell	5	4
Sweden	Fredrik Nyman	5	4
Czech Republic	Jaroslav Vedral	5	4
South Korea	Lee Jeong-jae	4	5
United States	Andrew Stopera	3	6
Russia	Aleksandr Bystrov	3	6
China	Hu Chenwei	1	8

=== Round-robin results ===
All draw times are listed in (UTC+7).

==== Draw 1 ====
Sunday, March 3, 14:00

Sheet A	1	2	3	4	5	6	7	8	9	10	Final
China	0	0	1	0	1	1	0	1	0	X	4
Russia 🔨	0	2	0	2	0	0	2	0	2	X	8

Sheet B	1	2	3	4	5	6	7	8	9	10	Final
Canada 🔨	0	1	0	2	1	0	3	2	X	X	9
South Korea	1	0	2	0	0	1	0	0	X	X	4

Sheet C	1	2	3	4	5	6	7	8	9	10	Final
Great Britain	1	0	0	0	0	0	1	0	X	X	2
United States 🔨	0	1	1	1	1	3	0	1	X	X	8

Sheet D	1	2	3	4	5	6	7	8	9	10	Final
Sweden	0	1	4	0	1	0	1	1	0	X	8
Czech Republic 🔨	2	0	0	0	0	1	0	0	1	X	4

Sheet E	1	2	3	4	5	6	7	8	9	10	Final
Norway 🔨	2	0	0	0	1	0	2	0	0	X	5
Switzerland	0	3	2	1	0	2	0	2	1	X	11

==== Draw 2 ====
Monday, March 4, 9:00

Sheet A	1	2	3	4	5	6	7	8	9	10	Final
South Korea	0	1	1	0	3	0	0	1	0	0	6
Sweden 🔨	1	0	0	2	0	1	1	0	0	2	7

Sheet B	1	2	3	4	5	6	7	8	9	10	Final
Russia	0	0	0	0	0	2	1	0	X	X	3
Czech Republic 🔨	2	2	1	1	3	0	0	1	X	X	10

Sheet C	1	2	3	4	5	6	7	8	9	10	Final
Norway 🔨	2	0	3	1	0	0	3	0	X	X	9
China	0	2	0	0	1	0	0	1	X	X	4

Sheet D	1	2	3	4	5	6	7	8	9	10	Final
Switzerland 🔨	1	1	1	1	0	3	0	3	X	X	10
United States	0	0	0	0	2	0	1	0	X	X	3

Sheet E	1	2	3	4	5	6	7	8	9	10	Final
Canada	0	0	2	0	1	0	3	0	X	X	6
Great Britain 🔨	2	2	0	2	0	4	0	2	X	X	12

==== Draw 3 ====
Monday, March 4, 19:00

Sheet A	1	2	3	4	5	6	7	8	9	10	Final
United States	0	0	1	0	5	0	2	0	X	X	8
Canada 🔨	3	3	0	1	0	5	0	1	X	X	13

Sheet B	1	2	3	4	5	6	7	8	9	10	Final
China	0	0	1	0	0	0	1	X	X	X	2
Switzerland 🔨	2	1	0	2	1	3	0	X	X	X	9

Sheet C	1	2	3	4	5	6	7	8	9	10	11	Final
Russia	0	1	0	0	1	0	0	2	0	0	1	5
Sweden 🔨	1	0	1	0	0	1	0	0	0	1	0	4

Sheet D	1	2	3	4	5	6	7	8	9	10	Final
Great Britain	0	0	2	0	4	0	3	0	3	X	12
Norway 🔨	3	1	0	1	0	1	0	2	0	X	8

Sheet E	1	2	3	4	5	6	7	8	9	10	Final
South Korea	1	0	2	0	0	0	1	0	X	X	4
Czech Republic 🔨	0	4	0	2	1	2	0	1	X	X	10

==== Draw 4 ====
Tuesday, March 5, 14:00

Sheet A	1	2	3	4	5	6	7	8	9	10	Final
Czech Republic 🔨	0	2	0	0	1	0	0	0	X	X	3
Norway	5	0	1	3	0	0	1	1	X	X	11

Sheet B	1	2	3	4	5	6	7	8	9	10	Final
Great Britain 🔨	1	0	1	2	0	0	2	0	0	X	6
Sweden	0	1	0	0	1	1	0	1	1	X	5

Sheet C	1	2	3	4	5	6	7	8	9	10	Final
Switzerland 🔨	1	0	0	0	3	0	2	0	0	0	6
South Korea	0	1	1	1	0	1	0	2	1	1	8

Sheet D	1	2	3	4	5	6	7	8	9	10	Final
United States 🔨	0	0	0	0	3	0	1	0	1	0	5
China	0	0	2	2	0	0	0	1	0	1	6

Sheet E	1	2	3	4	5	6	7	8	9	10	Final
Russia 🔨	0	1	0	0	0	2	0	0	3	0	6
Canada	0	0	0	2	0	0	1	1	0	1	5

==== Draw 5 ====
Wednesday, March 5, 9:00

Sheet A	1	2	3	4	5	6	7	8	9	10	Final
Great Britain	1	0	0	1	1	0	3	1	X	X	7
South Korea 🔨	0	0	1	0	0	1	0	0	X	X	2

Sheet B	1	2	3	4	5	6	7	8	9	10	Final
Norway 🔨	0	5	1	4	0	1	X	X	X	X	11
Russia	0	0	0	0	2	0	X	X	X	X	2

Sheet C	1	2	3	4	5	6	7	8	9	10	Final
China	0	2	0	0	0	2	0	0	0	X	4
Czech Republic 🔨	4	0	0	2	1	0	0	1	1	X	9

Sheet D	1	2	3	4	5	6	7	8	9	10	Final
Canada	0	2	0	2	0	2	1	0	3	1	11
Switzerland 🔨	2	0	1	0	2	0	0	2	0	0	7

Sheet E	1	2	3	4	5	6	7	8	9	10	Final
Sweden 🔨	1	0	1	0	0	3	0	2	1	X	8
United States	0	1	0	3	0	0	1	0	0	X	5

==== Draw 6 ====
Wednesday, March 6, 19:00

Sheet A	1	2	3	4	5	6	7	8	9	10	Final
Norway 🔨	0	0	2	0	1	0	1	0	2	0	6
United States	3	0	0	2	0	0	0	1	0	3	9

Sheet B	1	2	3	4	5	6	7	8	9	10	Final
South Korea 🔨	1	0	2	0	0	0	3	0	5	X	11
China	0	1	0	0	1	0	0	1	0	X	3

Sheet C	1	2	3	4	5	6	7	8	9	10	Final
Sweden	0	0	2	0	1	0	0	0	X	X	3
Canada 🔨	2	1	0	2	0	0	1	2	X	X	8

Sheet D	1	2	3	4	5	6	7	8	9	10	Final
Czech Republic	1	0	1	0	2	0	1	0	1	0	6
Great Britain 🔨	0	2	0	1	0	1	0	2	0	1	7

Sheet E	1	2	3	4	5	6	7	8	9	10	Final
Switzerland 🔨	0	0	3	0	2	2	0	0	0	X	7
Russia	0	1	0	1	0	0	2	1	0	X	5

==== Draw 7 ====
Thursday, March 7, 14:00

Sheet A	1	2	3	4	5	6	7	8	9	10	Final
Canada	0	0	0	0	3	0	1	0	X	X	4
Czech Republic 🔨	2	1	0	1	0	3	0	3	X	X	10

Sheet B	1	2	3	4	5	6	7	8	9	10	Final
Switzerland	1	0	1	0	2	1	0	2	0	1	8
Great Britain 🔨	0	2	0	1	0	0	1	0	1	0	5

Sheet C	1	2	3	4	5	6	7	8	9	10	Final
United States 🔨	1	0	0	0	2	0	0	3	1	1	8
Russia	0	0	0	2	0	2	1	0	0	0	5

Sheet D	1	2	3	4	5	6	7	8	9	10	Final
Norway 🔨	2	0	0	2	0	1	0	1	1	1	8
South Korea	0	1	1	0	2	0	1	0	0	0	5

Sheet E	1	2	3	4	5	6	7	8	9	10	Final
China	0	0	0	0	0	1	0	0	X	X	1
Sweden 🔨	0	2	2	2	1	0	3	0	X	X	10

==== Draw 8 ====
Friday, March 8, 9:00

Sheet A	1	2	3	4	5	6	7	8	9	10	Final
Russia	0	0	1	0	1	0	1	0	3	0	6
Great Britain 🔨	1	2	0	1	0	1	0	2	0	1	8

Sheet B	1	2	3	4	5	6	7	8	9	10	Final
Sweden	0	0	1	1	0	0	1	0	0	0	3
Norway 🔨	0	1	0	0	0	1	0	2	0	1	5

Sheet C	1	2	3	4	5	6	7	8	9	10	Final
Czech Republic 🔨	1	0	0	1	0	0	1	0	0	X	3
Switzerland	0	3	0	0	2	1	0	0	1	X	7

Sheet D	1	2	3	4	5	6	7	8	9	10	Final
China	0	1	0	0	0	0	1	0	2	X	4
Canada 🔨	2	0	2	1	1	0	0	1	0	X	7

Sheet E	1	2	3	4	5	6	7	8	9	10	Final
United States	0	0	0	1	0	2	0	0	1	X	4
South Korea 🔨	0	1	1	0	2	0	0	3	0	X	7

==== Draw 9 ====
Friday, March 8, 19:00

Sheet A	1	2	3	4	5	6	7	8	9	10	Final
Sweden	1	1	0	1	1	0	1	0	0	1	6
Switzerland 🔨	0	0	1	0	0	2	0	2	0	0	5

Sheet B	1	2	3	4	5	6	7	8	9	10	Final
Czech Republic 🔨	3	1	0	2	0	2	0	4	X	X	12
United States	0	0	1	0	2	0	2	0	X	X	5

Sheet C	1	2	3	4	5	6	7	8	9	10	Final
Canada 🔨	1	0	0	2	0	0	3	0	0	3	9
Norway	0	2	0	0	1	1	0	2	1	0	7

Sheet D	1	2	3	4	5	6	7	8	9	10	Final
South Korea 🔨	3	0	2	0	0	1	0	2	1	X	9
Russia	0	3	0	1	1	0	2	0	0	X	7

Sheet E	1	2	3	4	5	6	7	8	9	10	Final
Great Britain 🔨	0	0	3	2	0	4	1	2	X	X	12
China	1	3	0	0	2	0	0	0	X	X	6

=== Playoffs ===
Quarterfinals
4	Norway	13
5	Sweden	6
3	Switzerland	8
6	Czech Republic	4

Semifinals
1	Great Britain	6
4	Norway	8
2	Canada	9
3	Switzerland	8

Final
4	Norway	6
2	Canada	5
Bronze Medal Game
1	Great Britain	10
3	Switzerland	5

==== Quarterfinals ====
Saturday, March 9, 9:00

Sheet B	1	2	3	4	5	6	7	8	9	10	Final
Norway 🔨	3	0	2	0	3	0	4	1	X	X	13
Sweden	0	1	0	2	0	3	0	0	X	X	6

Sheet C	1	2	3	4	5	6	7	8	9	10	Final
Switzerland 🔨	3	1	0	2	0	0	1	1	0	X	8
Czech Republic	0	0	1	0	2	0	0	0	1	X	4

==== Semifinals ====
Saturday, March 9, 16:00

Sheet A	1	2	3	4	5	6	7	8	9	10	Final
Great Britain 🔨	1	0	1	0	0	2	0	0	2	0	6
Norway	0	1	0	2	1	0	2	1	0	1	8

Sheet D	1	2	3	4	5	6	7	8	9	10	11	Final
Canada 🔨	2	0	0	2	2	0	0	1	0	1	1	9
Switzerland	0	1	1	0	0	1	3	0	2	0	0	8

==== Bronze Medal Game ====
Sunday, March 10, 9:00

Sheet D	1	2	3	4	5	6	7	8	9	10	Final
Great Britain 🔨	1	0	2	1	0	1	0	1	0	4	10
Switzerland	0	1	0	0	1	0	1	0	2	0	5

==== Gold Medal Game ====
Sunday, March 10, 9:00

Sheet B	1	2	3	4	5	6	7	8	9	10	Final
Canada 🔨	0	1	0	0	1	0	1	0	2	0	5
Norway	1	0	0	1	0	1	0	2	0	1	6

== Women ==
=== Teams ===
Canada	China	Czech Republic	Great Britain	Italy
Skip: Kristen Streifel; Third: Danielle Schmiemann; Second: Selena Sturmay; Lead: Jesse Iles; Alternate: Paige Papley; Coach: Garry Coderre	Skip: Yang Ying; Third: Wang Zixin; Second: Cao Ying; Lead: Sun Chengyu; Alternate: Li He; Coach: Zhou Yan	Skip: Alžběta Baudyšová; Third: Michaela Baudyšová; Second: Lenka Hronová; Lead: Ežen Kolčevskaja; Alternate: Eliška Srnská; Coach: Jakub Bareš	Skip: Sophie Jackson; Third: Naomi Brown; Second: Mili Smith; Lead: Sophie Sinclair; Alternate: Leanne McKenzie; Coach: Tom Brewster	Skip: Stefania Constantini; Third: Angela Romei; Second: Marta Benedetto; Lead: Elena Dami; Alternate: Elisa Marten Perolino; Coach: Marco Mariani
Japan	South Korea	Russia	Switzerland	Sweden
Skip: Kaede Kudo; Third: Koyoka Kuramitsu; Second: Mayu Sugahara; Lead: Sakiko Suzuki; Alternate: Yui Tanaka; Coach: Ryo Ogihara	Skip: Kim Min-ji; Third: Kim Hye-rin; Second: Yang Tae-i; Lead: Kim Su-jin; Coach: Lee Sung-jun	Fourth: Maria Komarova; Skip: Uliana Vasileva; Second: Anastasia Danshina; Lead: Ekaterina Kuzmina; Alternate: Anna Venevtseva; Coach: Alina Kovaleva	Skip: Jana Stritt; Third: Roxane Heritier; Second: Adonia Brunner; Lead: Mara Grassi; Alternate: Larissa Berchtold; Coach: Raymond Krenger	Skip: Isabella Wranå; Third: Jennie Wåhlin; Second: Almida de Val; Lead: Fanny Sjöberg; Coach: Margaretha Sigfridsson

(source:)

=== Round-robin standings ===
Final round-robin standings

Key
Teams to Playoffs

Country	Skip	W	L
Sweden	Isabella Wranå	7	2
Russia	Maria Komarova	7	2
Canada	Kristen Streifel	7	2
South Korea	Kim Min-ji	6	3
China	Yang Ying	5	4
Great Britain	Sophie Jackson	5	4
Japan	Kaede Kudo	2	7
Switzerland	Jana Stritt	2	7
Czech Republic	Alžběta Baudyšová	2	7
Italy	Stefania Constantini	2	7

=== Round-robin results ===
All draw times are listed in (UTC+7).

==== Draw 1 ====
Sunday, March 3, 9:00

Sheet A	1	2	3	4	5	6	7	8	9	10	Final
Sweden 🔨	2	1	0	0	2	0	0	1	0	0	6
Czech Republic	0	0	1	1	0	3	1	0	2	1	9

Sheet B	1	2	3	4	5	6	7	8	9	10	11	Final
Great Britain	1	1	0	1	0	0	0	3	0	0	1	7
Switzerland 🔨	0	0	2	0	0	1	0	0	2	1	0	6

Sheet C	1	2	3	4	5	6	7	8	9	10	Final
Russia	0	3	0	1	1	0	1	1	1	X	8
Japan 🔨	1	0	1	0	0	2	0	0	0	X	4

Sheet D	1	2	3	4	5	6	7	8	9	10	Final
South Korea	1	0	0	3	1	0	0	1	1	X	7
Italy 🔨	0	1	0	0	0	1	1	0	0	X	3

Sheet E	1	2	3	4	5	6	7	8	9	10	Final
China 🔨	1	0	1	0	1	0	X	X	X	X	3
Canada	0	3	0	3	0	4	X	X	X	X	10

==== Draw 2 ====
Sunday, March 3, 19:00

Sheet A	1	2	3	4	5	6	7	8	9	10	Final
Switzerland	0	2	0	1	0	1	0	0	0	X	4
South Korea 🔨	1	0	3	0	1	0	1	1	1	X	8

Sheet B	1	2	3	4	5	6	7	8	9	10	Final
Czech Republic 🔨	1	0	2	0	0	2	0	0	0	3	8
Italy	0	1	0	0	3	0	1	0	1	0	6

Sheet C	1	2	3	4	5	6	7	8	9	10	Final
China 🔨	0	0	0	0	1	0	1	0	X	X	2
Sweden	1	2	3	1	0	3	0	3	X	X	13

Sheet D	1	2	3	4	5	6	7	8	9	10	Final
Canada 🔨	2	0	0	0	2	2	0	X	X	X	6
Japan	0	0	0	0	0	0	1	X	X	X	1

Sheet E	1	2	3	4	5	6	7	8	9	10	11	Final
Great Britain 🔨	1	0	0	0	0	1	0	2	0	2	0	6
Russia	0	0	2	1	1	0	1	0	1	0	1	7

==== Draw 3 ====
Monday, March 4, 14:00

Sheet A	1	2	3	4	5	6	7	8	9	10	Final
Japan 🔨	1	0	1	0	0	0	X	X	X	X	2
Great Britain	0	3	0	4	2	3	X	X	X	X	12

Sheet B	1	2	3	4	5	6	7	8	9	10	Final
Sweden 🔨	1	0	2	0	0	1	1	0	0	2	7
Canada	0	2	0	0	1	0	0	1	1	0	5

Sheet C	1	2	3	4	5	6	7	8	9	10	Final
Czech Republic 🔨	0	0	0	2	0	0	1	0	1	X	4
South Korea	0	0	2	0	3	1	0	2	0	X	8

Sheet D	1	2	3	4	5	6	7	8	9	10	Final
Russia	0	0	2	1	0	1	0	2	0	X	6
China 🔨	1	0	0	0	3	0	1	0	3	X	8

Sheet E	1	2	3	4	5	6	7	8	9	10	Final
Switzerland	0	0	1	2	3	0	1	2	X	X	9
Italy 🔨	0	1	0	0	0	1	0	0	X	X	2

==== Draw 4 ====
Tuesday, March 5, 9:00

Sheet A	1	2	3	4	5	6	7	8	9	10	Final
Italy 🔨	0	0	2	0	0	0	4	0	2	4	12
China	0	1	0	1	1	1	0	2	0	0	6

Sheet B	1	2	3	4	5	6	7	8	9	10	11	Final
Russia	0	0	0	0	2	0	1	0	3	0	2	8
South Korea 🔨	0	1	0	0	0	1	0	2	0	2	0	6

Sheet C	1	2	3	4	5	6	7	8	9	10	Final
Canada 🔨	4	0	0	4	0	0	0	0	2	X	10
Switzerland	0	1	1	0	1	1	1	1	0	X	6

Sheet D	1	2	3	4	5	6	7	8	9	10	Final
Japan	0	1	0	0	1	0	0	0	X	X	2
Sweden 🔨	0	0	2	1	0	2	1	1	X	X	7

Sheet E	1	2	3	4	5	6	7	8	9	10	Final
Czech Republic 🔨	0	1	0	0	3	0	0	X	X	X	4
Great Britain	1	0	3	1	0	4	2	X	X	X	11

==== Draw 5 ====
Tuesday, March 5, 19:00

Sheet A	1	2	3	4	5	6	7	8	9	10	Final
Russia 🔨	1	3	4	0	2	0	0	0	0	3	13
Switzerland	0	0	0	1	0	2	3	2	1	0	9

Sheet B	1	2	3	4	5	6	7	8	9	10	Final
China 🔨	0	0	0	2	0	1	1	0	0	1	5
Czech Republic	0	2	0	0	1	0	0	0	0	0	3

Sheet C	1	2	3	4	5	6	7	8	9	10	Final
Sweden 🔨	0	1	0	1	1	0	4	0	1	X	8
Italy	0	0	1	0	0	1	0	1	0	X	3

Sheet D	1	2	3	4	5	6	7	8	9	10	Final
Great Britain 🔨	2	0	2	4	0	1	0	0	3	X	12
Canada	0	2	0	0	1	0	2	2	0	X	7

Sheet E	1	2	3	4	5	6	7	8	9	10	Final
South Korea 🔨	1	0	1	1	1	3	0	X	X	X	7
Japan	0	1	0	0	0	0	1	X	X	X	2

==== Draw 6 ====
Wednesday, March 6, 14:00

Sheet A	1	2	3	4	5	6	7	8	9	10	Final
China 🔨	0	2	0	2	0	0	0	1	0	1	6
Japan	0	0	2	0	0	0	2	0	1	0	5

Sheet B	1	2	3	4	5	6	7	8	9	10	Final
Switzerland	0	2	0	0	0	0	X	X	X	X	2
Sweden 🔨	2	0	0	3	2	4	X	X	X	X	11

Sheet C	1	2	3	4	5	6	7	8	9	10	Final
South Korea 🔨	1	4	0	1	1	2	X	X	X	X	9
Great Britain	0	0	1	0	0	0	X	X	X	X	1

Sheet D	1	2	3	4	5	6	7	8	9	10	Final
Italy	0	0	0	0	2	1	0	0	X	X	3
Russia 🔨	1	1	2	1	0	0	3	1	X	X	9

Sheet E	1	2	3	4	5	6	7	8	9	10	Final
Canada	0	2	1	0	3	1	1	X	X	X	8
Czech Republic 🔨	1	0	0	1	0	0	0	X	X	X	2

==== Draw 7 ====
Thursday, March 7, 9:00

Sheet A	1	2	3	4	5	6	7	8	9	10	Final
Great Britain 🔨	2	3	0	1	0	2	1	0	0	1	10
Italy	0	0	2	0	2	0	0	2	2	0	8

Sheet B	1	2	3	4	5	6	7	8	9	10	Final
Canada 🔨	1	0	2	0	1	0	2	0	2	1	9
Russia	0	3	0	1	0	2	0	2	0	0	8

Sheet C	1	2	3	4	5	6	7	8	9	10	Final
Japan 🔨	1	0	1	1	1	0	1	1	0	1	7
Czech Republic	0	2	0	0	0	1	0	0	1	0	4

Sheet D	1	2	3	4	5	6	7	8	9	10	Final
China	0	1	0	1	0	2	0	0	1	1	6
Switzerland 🔨	1	0	1	0	1	0	1	1	0	0	5

Sheet E	1	2	3	4	5	6	7	8	9	10	Final
Sweden	1	1	0	2	0	2	0	2	X	X	8
South Korea 🔨	0	0	1	0	1	0	1	0	X	X	3

==== Draw 8 ====
Thursday, March 7, 19:00

Sheet A	1	2	3	4	5	6	7	8	9	10	Final
Czech Republic 🔨	2	0	0	1	0	0	0	0	1	X	4
Russia	0	1	2	0	0	2	1	3	0	X	9

Sheet B	1	2	3	4	5	6	7	8	9	10	Final
South Korea	1	0	1	0	2	0	2	0	3	X	9
China 🔨	0	1	0	1	0	1	0	1	0	X	4

Sheet C	1	2	3	4	5	6	7	8	9	10	11	Final
Italy 🔨	1	0	1	0	1	0	0	1	1	1	0	6
Canada	0	2	0	1	0	1	2	0	0	0	1	7

Sheet D	1	2	3	4	5	6	7	8	9	10	Final
Sweden 🔨	0	3	0	1	0	1	1	0	2	X	8
Great Britain	0	0	1	0	1	0	0	1	0	X	3

Sheet E	1	2	3	4	5	6	7	8	9	10	Final
Japan	3	0	0	0	2	0	1	0	3	X	9
Switzerland 🔨	0	2	1	1	0	1	0	1	0	X	6

==== Draw 9 ====
Friday, March 8, 14:00

Sheet A	1	2	3	4	5	6	7	8	9	10	Final
South Korea	0	0	0	0	1	0	0	0	X	X	1
Canada 🔨	2	1	1	1	0	1	1	2	X	X	9

Sheet B	1	2	3	4	5	6	7	8	9	10	11	Final
Italy	0	0	0	3	0	0	2	0	0	2	2	9
Japan 🔨	0	0	2	0	1	1	0	1	2	0	0	7

Sheet C	1	2	3	4	5	6	7	8	9	10	Final
Great Britain 🔨	1	0	0	0	3	0	1	0	3	0	8
China	0	1	1	1	0	2	0	3	0	2	10

Sheet D	1	2	3	4	5	6	7	8	9	10	Final
Switzerland 🔨	0	0	2	0	4	4	1	2	X	X	13
Czech Republic	0	0	0	2	0	0	0	0	X	X	2

Sheet E	1	2	3	4	5	6	7	8	9	10	Final
Russia 🔨	2	1	0	0	1	0	2	0	1	X	7
Sweden	0	0	1	1	0	1	0	2	0	X	5

=== Playoffs ===
Quarterfinals
3	Canada	4
6	Great Britain	6
4	South Korea	12
5	China	5

Semifinals
1	Sweden	10
6	Great Britain	2
2	Russia	4
4	South Korea	7

Final
1	Sweden	8
4	South Korea	3
Bronze medal game
6	Great Britain	5
2	Russia	12

==== Quarterfinals ====
Saturday, March 9, 9:00

Sheet D	1	2	3	4	5	6	7	8	9	10	Final
Canada 🔨	0	1	0	0	1	0	2	0	0	0	4
Great Britain	0	0	0	1	0	1	0	0	2	2	6

Sheet A	1	2	3	4	5	6	7	8	9	10	Final
South Korea 🔨	1	0	2	2	0	4	0	3	X	X	12
China	0	1	0	0	2	0	2	0	X	X	5

==== Semifinals ====
Saturday, March 9, 16:00

Sheet C	1	2	3	4	5	6	7	8	9	10	Final
Sweden 🔨	0	2	0	0	4	1	0	3	X	X	10
Great Britain	0	0	0	1	0	0	1	0	X	X	2

Sheet B	1	2	3	4	5	6	7	8	9	10	Final
Russia 🔨	2	1	0	0	0	0	0	0	1	X	4
South Korea	0	0	1	1	0	0	2	3	0	X	7

==== Bronze Medal Game ====
Sunday, March 10, 14:00

Sheet B	1	2	3	4	5	6	7	8	9	10	Final
Russia 🔨	2	3	0	2	0	0	2	3	X	X	12
Great Britain	0	0	2	0	2	1	0	0	X	X	5

==== Gold Medal Game ====
Sunday, March 10, 14:00

Sheet D	1	2	3	4	5	6	7	8	9	10	Final
Sweden 🔨	2	1	0	1	2	0	2	0	X	X	8
South Korea	0	0	2	0	0	0	0	1	X	X	3
