= Ekaterina Kuzmina =

Russian curler (born 1996)

- Curler
- Born: 5 January 1996 (age 30); Moscow, Russia

Team
- Curling club: Adamant CC, Saint Petersburg, RUS
- Skip: Alina Kovaleva
- Third: Galina Arsenkina
- Second: Maria Komarova
- Lead: Ekaterina Kuzmina
- Alternate: Vera Tyulyakova

Curling career
- Member Association: Russia
- World Championship: 2 (2019, 2021)
- European Championship: 3 (2018, 2019, 2021)
- Olympic: 1 (2022)
- Other appearances: World Mixed Championship: 1 (2015), European Mixed Championship: 1 (2012), World Junior Championships: 3 (2015, 2016, 2017), Winter Universiade: 1 (2019)
Medal record
Women's curling
Representing RCF
World Curling Championships
Silver medal – second place	2021 Calgary
Representing Russia
Winter Universiade
Bronze medal – third place	2019 Krasnoyarsk
Russian Women's Championships
Gold medal – first place	2019 Sochi
Silver medal – second place	2017 Sochi
Silver medal – second place	2018 Sochi
Bronze medal – third place	2016 Sochi

Ekaterina Anatolievna Kuzmina (Russian: Екатери́на Анато́льевна Кузьмина́; born 5 January 1996) is a Russian curler from Moscow.

== Awards and honours ==
- Master of Sports of Russia (curling, 2015).
- Master of Sports of Russia, International Class (curling, 2016).

== Teams and events ==
=== Women's ===
Season	Skip	Third	Second	Lead	Alternate	Coach	Events
2014–15	Evgeniya Demkina	Ekaterina Kuzmina	Uliana Vasilyeva	Anastasia Moskaleva	Irina Kolesnikova		
2014–15	Uliana Vasilyeva (fourth)	Maria Baksheeva	Ekaterina Kuzmina	Evgeniya Demkina (skip)	Anastasia Moskaleva	Anders Kraupp	WJCC 2015 (7th)
2015–16	Uliana Vasilyeva (fourth)	Maria Baksheeva	Ekaterina Kuzmina	Evgeniya Demkina (skip)	Maria Komarova	Irina Kolesnikova	WJCC 2016 (7th)
2015–16	Alina Kovaleva	Uliana Vasilyeva	Ekaterina Kuzmina	Maria Komarova	Oxana Bogdanova	Alexey Tselousov	RWCCh 2016 (bronze)
2016–17	Maria Baksheeva	Alina Kovaleva	Uliana Vasilyeva	Maria Komarova	Ekaterina Kuzmina		RWCCup 2016 (5th)
2016–17	Maria Baksheeva	Daria Morozova	Maria Komarova	Ekaterina Kuzmina	Olga Kotelnikova	Alexey Tselousov	WJCC 2017 (6th)
2016–17	Alina Kovaleva	Uliana Vasilyeva	Ekaterina Kuzmina	Maria Komarova	Maria Baksheeva	Alexey Tselousov	RWCCh 2017 (silver)
2017–18	Alina Kovaleva	Maria Komarova	Galina Arsenkina	Ekaterina Kuzmina	Anastasia Danshina		
2017–18	Alina Kovaleva	Anastasia Bryzgalova	Uliana Vasilyeva	Ekaterina Kuzmina	Valeria Miroshnichenko		RWCCh 2018 (silver)
2018–19	Alina Kovaleva	Maria Komarova	Galina Arsenkina	Ekaterina Kuzmina	Anastasia Danshina		
2018–19	Alina Kovaleva	Anastasia Bryzgalova	Galina Arsenkina	Ekaterina Kuzmina	Uliana Vasilyeva (ECC, WCC, RWCCh)	Igor Minin, Irina Kolesnikova	ECC 2018 (4th); CWC/2 (6th); WWCC 2019 (5th); RWCCh 2019 (gold)
2018–19	Maria Komarova (fourth)	Uliana Vasilyeva (skip)	Anastasia Danshina	Ekaterina Kuzmina	Anna Venevtseva	Alina Kovaleva, Viktor Vorobev	WUG 2019 (bronze)
2019–20	Alina Kovaleva	Maria Komarova	Galina Arsenkina	Ekaterina Kuzmina	Anastasia Danshina	Irina Kolesnikova, Alexey Tselousov	ECC 2019 (4th)
2020–21	Alina Kovaleva	Maria Komarova	Galina Arsenkina	Ekaterina Kuzmina	Vera Tyulyakova	Anastasia Bryzgalova	RWCCup 2020 (gold)
2020–21	Alina Kovaleva	Yulia Portunova	Galina Arsenkina	Ekaterina Kuzmina	Maria Komarova	Sergei Belanov, Irina Kolesnikova	WWCC 2021 (silver)
2021–22	Alina Kovaleva	Yulia Portunova	Galina Arsenkina	Ekaterina Kuzmina	Maria Komarova	Sergei Belanov, Irina Kolesnikova	ECC 2021 (4th)
2022–23	Alina Kovaleva	Galina Arsenkina	Maria Komarova	Ekaterina Kuzmina	Vera Tyulyakova	Anastasia Bryzgalova	RWCCup 2022 (gold)

=== Mixed ===
Season	Skip	Third	Second	Lead	Alternate	Coach	Events
2011–12	Evgeny Tavirikov	Ekaterina Kuzmina	Alexandr Kuzmin	Valeriya Shelkova			RMxCCh 2012 (7th)
2012–13	Roman Kutuzov	Evgeniya Demkina	Sergey Manulychev	Ekaterina Kuzmina	Vadim Raev, Valeriya Shelkova		EMxCC 2012 (14th)
2012–13	Ekaterina Kuzmina	Alexandr Kuzmin	Maria Baksheeva	Sergey Morozov			RMxCCh 2013 (15th)
2015–16	Uliana Vasilyeva (fourth)	Alexey Tselousov (skip)	Ekaterina Kuzmina	Evgeny Klimov		Igor Minin	WMxCC 2015 (4th)

=== Mixed doubles ===
Season	Male	Female	Events
2012–13	Sergey Manulichev	Ekaterina Kuzmina	RMDCCup 2012 (9th)
2013–14	Vadim Golov	Ekaterina Kuzmina	RMDCCh 2014 (5th)
2014–15	Sergey Andrianov	Ekaterina Kuzmina	RMDCCup 2014 (4th)
2015–16	Evgeny Klimov	Ekaterina Kuzmina	RMDCCup 2015 (4th); RMDCCh 2016 (13th)
2016–17	Alexandr Kuzmin	Ekaterina Kuzmina	
