= 2019 Russian Women's Curling Cup =

- Host city: Sochi
- Arena: Ice Cube Curling Center
- Dates: December 18–22, 2019
- Winner: UOR 2 (Saint Petersburg)
- Skip: Irina Nizovtseva
- Third: Nadegda Belyakova
- Second: Arina Pyantina
- Lead: Daria Patrikeeva
- Alternate: Anastasia Kilchevskaya
- Finalist: Krasnodar Krai (Sochi; Liudmila Privivkova)

The 2019 Russian Women's Curling Cup (Russian: Кубок России среди женских команд 2019) was held from December 18 to 22 at the Ice Cube Curling Center arena in Sochi.

All games played are 8 ends.

All times are listed in Moscow Time (UTC+03:00)

== Teams ==
| Team | Locale | Skip | Third | Second | Lead | Alternate |
|---|---|---|---|---|---|---|
| Adamant Saint Petersburg 2 | Saint Petersburg | Maria Ermeychuk | Anastasia Khalanskaya | Olga Antonova | Maria Drozdova | Aleksandra Kulumbekova |
| Komsomoll 1 | Irkutsk | Elizaveta Trukhina | Nina Polikarpova | Valeria Denisenko | Victoria Desova | |
| Krasnodar Krai | Sochi | Liudmila Privivkova | Maria Ignatenko | Sophia Tkach | Irina Poletaeva | Polina Murzina |
| Leningrad Oblast | Saint Petersburg | Oksana Popovich | Evgeniya Ekimovskaya | Elena Ustinova | Olga Belolipetskaya | Aleksandra Kamkina |
| Moscow Oblast 1 | Dmitrov | Vlada Rumiantseva | Alexandra Kardapoltseva | Irina Riazanova | Anastasiia Mishchenko | Marina Verenich |
| Moscow Oblast 2 | Dmitrov | Kseniya Shevchuk | Ekaterina Tolstova | Daria Panchenko | Daria Styoksova | Victoria Postnova |
| Moscow Oblast 3 | Dmitrov | Kseniya Lokhankina | Alina Lyotz | Anastasia Paramonova | Ekaterina Ivanova | |
| Moskvitch 2 | Moscow | Sophia Orazalina | Lolita Tretyak | Arina Rusina | Maria Arhipova | Daria Burakova |
| Moskvitch 3 | Moscow | Xeniya Novikova | Natalia Gubanova | Polina Tchernikh | Daria Tskhvedanashvili | Nika Nikitina |
| Moskvitch-MKK | Moscow | Ekaterina Teljnova | Kseniya Strelkova | Tatiana Poblagueva | Nataljya Kolotilina | |
| Moskvitch-Zekurion | Moscow | Alina Biktimirova | Ekaterina Antonova | Irina Belyayeva | Anna Antonyuk | Marina Maleeva |
| Novosibirsk Oblast | Novosibirsk | Ekaterina Kungurova | Aleksandra Stoyarosova | Aleksandra Moszherina | Tatiana Filyushova | |
| Saint Petersburg 1 | Saint Petersburg | Diana Margaryan | Valeria Miroshnichenko | Alina Borodulina | Anastasia Eksuzyan | Arina Artamonova |
| ShVSM po ZVS | Saint Petersburg | Anastasia Babarykina | Anastasia Belikova | Victoria Shtreker | Anna Prokudina | Regina Bogdanova |
| UOR 2 | Saint Petersburg | Irina Nizovtseva | Nadegda Belyakova | Arina Pyantina | Daria Patrikeeva | Anastasia Kilchevskaya |
| Vorobyovy Gory | Moscow | Evgeniya Mamykina | Anastasia Beginina | Ravilya Iskakova | Ekaterina Korolyova | |

== Round-robin results and standings ==
Key
| Teams to Playoffs |

Group A

| | Team | Skip | А1 | А2 | А3 | А4 | А5 | А6 | А7 | А8 | Wins | Losses | DSC, cm | Place |
|---|---|---|---|---|---|---|---|---|---|---|---|---|---|---|
| А1 | Novosibirsk Oblast | Ekaterina Kungurova | * | 2:7 | 8:3 | 6:7 | 6:0 | 5:7 | 3:4 | 7:5 | 3 | 4 | 66,66 | 5 |
| А2 | Moscow Oblast 2 | Kseniya Shevchuk | 7:2 | * | 6:7 | 5:2 | 7:2 | 6:3 | 1:8 | 4:5 | 4 | 3 | 84,83 | 4 |
| А3 | Komsomoll 1 | Elizaveta Trukhina | 3:8 | 7:6 | * | 6:5 | 10:4 | 2:7 | 10:4 | 9:2 | 5 | 2 | 97,87 | 2 |
| А4 | Saint Petersburg 1 | Diana Margaryan | 7:6 | 2:5 | 5:6 | * | 5:6 | 5:7 | 3:6 | 6:4 | 2 | 5 | 64,50 | 6 |
| А5 | Vorobyovy Gory | Evgeniya Mamykina | 0:6 | 2:7 | 4:10 | 6:5 | * | 5:7 | 11:2 | 5:9 | 2 | 5 | 70,06 | 7 |
| А6 | Adamant Saint Petersburg 2 | Maria Ermeychuk | 7:5 | 3:6 | 7:2 | 7:5 | 7:5 | * | 5:3 | 5:3 | 6 | 1 | 118,29 | 1 |
| А7 | Leningrad Oblast | Oksana Popovich | 4:3 | 8:1 | 4:10 | 6:3 | 2:11 | 3:5 | * | 8:5 | 4 | 3 | 102,87 | 3 |
| А8 | Moskvitch 3 | Xeniya Novikova | 5:7 | 5:4 | 2:9 | 4:6 | 9:5 | 3:5 | 5:8 | * | 2 | 5 | 96,08 | 8 |

Group B

| | Team | Skip | B1 | B2 | B3 | B4 | B5 | B6 | B7 | B8 | Wins | Losses | DSC, cm | Place |
|---|---|---|---|---|---|---|---|---|---|---|---|---|---|---|
| B1 | Moskvitch-MKK | Ekaterina Teljnova | * | 7:5 | 4:5 | 2:3 | 8:2 | 1:10 | 6:7 | 6:5 | 3 | 4 | 58,09 | 6 |
| B2 | Moscow Oblast 3 | Kseniya Lokhankina | 5:7 | * | 6:7 | 2:4 | 4:6 | 1:8 | 2:9 | 2:7 | 0 | 7 | 116,36 | 8 |
| B3 | UOR 2 | Irina Nizovtseva | 5:4 | 7:6 | * | 8:3 | 7:6 | 7:6 | 10:1 | 5:4 | 7 | 0 | 74,33 | 1 |
| B4 | ShVSM po ZVS | Anastasia Babarykina | 3:2 | 4:2 | 3:8 | * | 5:3 | 7:3 | 3:5 | 3:6 | 4 | 3 | 75,46 | 4 |
| B5 | Moskvitch 2 | Sophia Orazalina | 2:8 | 6:4 | 6:7 | 3:5 | * | 3:7 | 4:7 | 7:4 | 2 | 5 | 48,31 | 7 |
| B6 | Moscow Oblast 1 | Vlada Rumiantseva | 10:1 | 8:1 | 6:7 | 3:7 | 7:3 | * | 7:4 | 4:8 | 4 | 3 | 86,68 | 5 |
| B7 | Moskvitch-Zekurion | Alina Biktimirova | 7:6 | 9:2 | 1:10 | 5:3 | 7:4 | 4:7 | * | 5:6 | 4 | 3 | 64,17 | 3 |
| B8 | Krasnodar Krai | Liudmila Privivkova | 5:6 | 7:2 | 4:5 | 6:3 | 4:7 | 8:4 | 6:5 | * | 4 | 3 | 48,89 | 2 |

== Playoffs ==
Semifinals
A-1 | Adamant Saint Petersburg 2 (Maria Ermeychuk) | 3
B-2 | Krasnodar Krai (Liudmila Privivkova) | 5
B-1 | UOR 2 (Irina Nizovtseva) | 6
A-2 | Komsomoll 1 (Elizaveta Trukhina) | 4

Final
Krasnodar Krai (Liudmila Privivkova) | 2
UOR 2 (Irina Nizovtseva) | 3
Third place
Adamant Saint Petersburg 2 (Maria Ermeychuk) | 7
Komsomoll 1 (Elizaveta Trukhina) | 2

=== Semifinals ===
December 21, 7:40 pm

| Sheet A | 1 | 2 | 3 | 4 | 5 | 6 | 7 | 8 | Final |
| Krasnodar Krai (Liudmila Privivkova) 🔨 | 0 | 1 | 1 | 1 | 0 | 2 | 0 | X | 5 |
| Adamant Saint Petersburg 2 (Maria Ermeychuk) | 0 | 0 | 0 | 0 | 1 | 0 | 2 | X | 3 |

| Sheet B | 1 | 2 | 3 | 4 | 5 | 6 | 7 | 8 | Final |
| UOR 2 (Irina Nizovtseva) | 2 | 0 | 1 | 0 | 0 | 1 | 0 | 2 | 6 |
| Komsomoll 1 (Elizaveta Trukhina) 🔨 | 0 | 2 | 0 | 0 | 1 | 0 | 1 | 0 | 4 |

=== Third place ===
December 22, 10:00 am

| Sheet D | 1 | 2 | 3 | 4 | 5 | 6 | 7 | 8 | Final |
| Komsomoll 1 (Elizaveta Trukhina) | 0 | 0 | 1 | 0 | 1 | 0 | 0 | X | 2 |
| Adamant Saint Petersburg 2 (Maria Ermeychuk) 🔨 | 1 | 1 | 0 | 1 | 0 | 1 | 3 | X | 7 |

=== Final ===
December 22, 10:00 am

| Sheet C | 1 | 2 | 3 | 4 | 5 | 6 | 7 | 8 | Final |
| UOR 2 (Irina Nizovtseva) 🔨 | 1 | 0 | 1 | 0 | 1 | 0 | 0 | 0 | 3 |
| Krasnodar Krai (Liudmila Privivkova) | 0 | 0 | 0 | 1 | 0 | 1 | 0 | 0 | 2 |

== Final standings ==
| Place | Team | Skip | Games | Wins | Losses | Place after RR | DSC, cm |
|---|---|---|---|---|---|---|---|
| 1st place, gold medalist(s) | UOR 2 | Irina Nizovtseva | 9 | 9 | 0 | 1 | 74,33 |
| 2nd place, silver medalist(s) | Krasnodar Krai | Liudmila Privivkova | 9 | 5 | 4 | 2 | 48,89 |
| 3rd place, bronze medalist(s) | Adamant Saint Petersburg 2 | Maria Ermeychuk | 9 | 7 | 2 | 1 | 118,29 |
| 4 | Komsomoll 1 | Elizaveta Trukhina | 9 | 5 | 4 | 2 | 98,28 |
| 5 | Moskvitch-Zekurion | Alina Biktimirova | 7 | 4 | 3 | 3 | 64,17 |
| 6 | Leningrad Oblast | Oksana Popovich | 7 | 4 | 3 | 3 | 102,87 |
| 7 | ShVSM po ZVS | Anastasia Babarykina | 7 | 4 | 3 | 4 | 75,46 |
| 8 | Moscow Oblast 2 | Kseniya Shevchuk | 7 | 4 | 3 | 4 | 84,83 |
| 9 | Novosibirsk Oblast | Ekaterina Kungurova | 7 | 3 | 4 | 5 | 66,66 |
| 10 | Moscow Oblast 1 | Vlada Rumiantseva | 7 | 4 | 3 | 5 | 86,68 |
| 11 | Moskvitch-MKK | Ekaterina Teljnova | 7 | 3 | 4 | 6 | 58,09 |
| 12 | Saint Petersburg 1 | Diana Margaryan | 7 | 2 | 5 | 6 | 64,50 |
| 13 | Moskvitch 2 | Sophia Orazalina | 7 | 2 | 5 | 7 | 48,31 |
| 14 | Vorobyovy Gory | Evgeniya Mamykina | 7 | 2 | 5 | 7 | 70,06 |
| 15 | Moskvitch 3 | Xeniya Novikova | 7 | 2 | 5 | 8 | 96,08 |
| 16 | Moscow Oblast 3 | Kseniya Lokhankina | 7 | 0 | 7 | 8 | 116,36 |

== See also ==
- 2019 Russian Men's Curling Cup
