= Vlada Rumiantseva =

Russian curler

- Curler
- Born: 28 December 2000 (age 25)

Team
- Skip: Vlada Rumiantseva
- Third: Irina Riazanova
- Second: Anastasia Mishchenko
- Lead: Aleksandra Kardapoltseva
- Alternate: Alina Lyotz
- Mixed doubles partner: Alexey Kulikov

Curling career
- Member Association: Russia
- Other appearances: World Junior Curling Championships: 2 (2018, 2019)
Medal record
Women's curling
Representing Russia
World Junior Championships
Gold medal – first place	2019 Liverpool
Bronze medal – third place	2020 Krasnoyarsk
Representing Moscow Oblast
Russian Women's Championship
Bronze medal – third place	2019 Sochi

Vlada Alexeyevna Rumiantseva (Russian: Вла́да Алексе́евна Румя́нцева; born 20 December 2000) is a Russian curler.

She is a student at the Russian State University of Physical Education, Sport, Youth and Tourism in Moscow.

== Awards ==
- Master of Sports of Russia (curling, 2018).

== Teams and events ==
=== Women's ===
Season	Skip	Third	Second	Lead	Alternate	Coach	Events
2016–17	Vlada Rumiantseva	Anastasia Mishchenko	Irina Riazanova	Anastasia Shustrova			RWCCup 2016 (11th)
2016–17	Ksenia Shevchuk	Vlada Rumiantseva	Irina Riazanova	Anastasia Mishchenko	Anastasia Shustrova	Tatiana Lukina	RWCCh 2017 (6th)
2017–18	Vlada Rumiantseva	Vera Tiuliakova	Irina Riazanova	Anastasiia Danshina	Daria Patrikeeva	Alexey Tselousov	WJCC 2018 (8th)
2017–18	Vlada Rumiantseva	Anastasia Mishchenko	Irina Riazanova	Ksenia Shevchuk	Anastasia Shustrova		RWCCh 2018 (6th)
2018–19	Vlada Rumiantseva	Daria Morozova	Irina Riazanova	Anastasia Mishchenko	Vera Tiuliakova (WJCC)	Andrey Drozdov	WJCC 2019 (gold); RWCCh 2019 (bronze)
2019–20	Vlada Rumiantseva	Alexandra Kardapoltseva	Irina Riazanova	Anastasia Mishchenko	Marina Verenich		RWCCup 2019 (10th)
2019–20	Vlada Rumiantseva	Vera Tiuliakova	Irina Riazanova	Anastasia Mishchenko	Alexandra Kardapoltseva	Andrey Drozdov, Tatiana Lukina	WJCC 2020 (bronze)
2020–21	Vlada Rumiantseva	Irina Riazanova	Anastasia Mishchenko	Alexandra Kardapoltseva	Alina Lyotz	Tatiana Lukina, Marina Verenich	RWCCup 2020 (bronze)

=== Mixed ===
Season	Skip	Third	Second	Lead	Events
2017–18	Kirill Surovov	Vlada Rumiantseva	Alexey Filippov	Anastasia Mishchenko	RMxCCup 2017 (5th)
2018–19	Mikhail Vaskov	Vlada Rumiantseva	Alexey Tuzov	Daria Morozova	RMxCCup 2018 (bronze)
2020–21	Mikhail Vaskov (fourth)	Vlada Rumiantseva (skip)	Petr Kuznetsov	Anastasiya Mishchenko	RMxCCh 2020 (4th)

=== Mixed doubles ===
Season	Male	Female	Events
2014–15	Mikhail Vaskov	Vlada Rumiantseva	RMDCCup 2015 (23rd)
2015–16	Alexey Kulikov	Vlada Rumiantseva	RMDCCup 2016 (4th); RMDCCh 2017 (13th)
2016–17	Alexey Kulikov	Vlada Rumiantseva	RMDCCh 2016 (9th)
