= Vasily Gudin =

Russian curler and coach

- Curler ♂
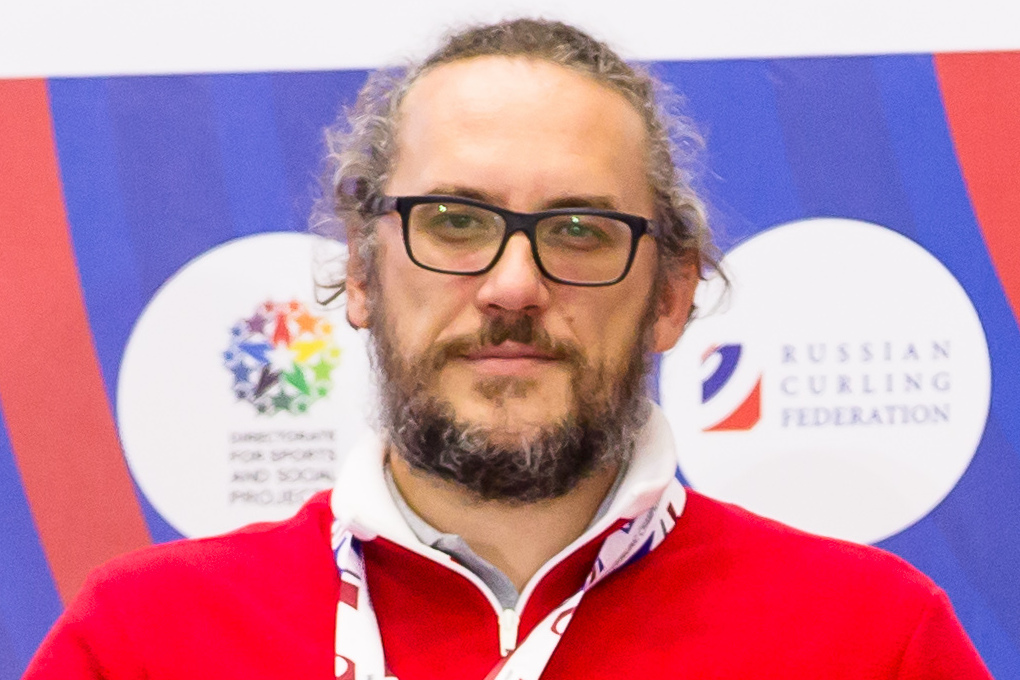
- Born: 26 September 1977 (age 49); Moscow

Curling career
- Member Association: Russia
Medal record
Curling

Vasily Nikolaevich Gudin (Russian: Васи́лий Никола́евич Гу́дин; born 26 September 1977 in Moscow) is a Russian curler and curling coach.

As a coach of Russian men's curling team he participated in 2014 Winter Olympics, as a coach of "Olympic Athletes from Russia" (OAR) mixed doubles curling team he participated in 2018 Winter Olympics.

== Record as a coach of national teams ==
Year	Tournament, event	National team	Place
2012	2012 European Curling Championships	Russia (men)	1st place, gold medalist(s)
2016	2016 World Mixed Curling Championship	Russia (mixed team)	1st place, gold medalist(s)
2017	2017 World Mixed Doubles Curling Championship	Russia (mixed doubles)	9
2018	2018 Winter Olympics	Olympic Athletes from Russia; Anastasia Bryzgalova; Alexander Krushelnitskiy	DSQ
2018	2018 World Mixed Doubles Curling Championship	Russia (mixed doubles)	2nd place, silver medalist(s)
2018	2018–19 Curling World Cup – First Leg	Russia (mixed doubles)	5
2018	2018 World Mixed Curling Championship	Russia (mixed team)	3rd place, bronze medalist(s)
2019	2018–19 Curling World Cup – Second Leg	Russia (mixed doubles)	7
2019	2018–19 Curling World Cup – Third Leg	Russia (mixed doubles)	6
2019	2019 World Mixed Doubles Curling Championship	Russia (mixed doubles)	5
2019	2018–19 Curling World Cup – Grand Final	Russia (mixed doubles)	8
2019	2019 World Mixed Curling Championship	Russia (mixed team)	9
