= Irina Kolesnikova (curler) =

Russian female curler and curling coach

- Curler ♀
- Born: 10 May 1964 (age 62); Leningrad, RSFSR, USSR

Team
- Curling club: Saint Petersburg

Curling career
- Member Association: Russia
- European Championship: 5 (1994, 1995, 1996, 1998, 1999)
- Other appearances: World Senior Championships: 5 (2015, 2016, 2017, 2018, 2019)

Irina Vladimirovna Kolesnikova (Russian: Ири́на Влади́мировна Коле́сникова; born 10 May 1964 in Leningrad, RSFSR, USSR) is a Russian curler and curling coach.

As a coach of Russian women's curling team she participated in 2018 Winter Olympics.

She is Master of Sport of Russia (1995) and Merited Coach of Russia (Russian: Заслуженный тренер России, curling, 2016).

== Teams ==
=== Women's ===
Season	Skip	Third	Second	Lead	Alternate	Coach	Events
1994–95	Tatiana Smirnova	Irina Kolesnikova	Marina Tcherepanova	Ekaterina Lissitskaia		Jury Shouliko	ECC 1994 (16th)
1995–96	Tatiana Smirnova	Irina Kolesnikova	Ekaterina Lissitskaia	Marina Tcherepanova	Natalie Loukashenkova	Joe Wälchli	ECC 1995 (11th)
1996–97	Tatiana Smirnova	Irina Kolesnikova	Yana Nekrasova	Marina Tcherepanova			ECC 1996 (13th)
1998–99	Tatiana Smirnova	Irina Kolesnikova	Yana Nekrasova	Marina Tcherepanova			ECC 1998 (11th)
1999–00	Olga Jarkova (fourth)	Nina Golovtchenko (skip)	Yana Nekrasova	Irina Kolesnikova	Tatiana Smirnova	Olga Andrianova	ECC 1999 (8th)
2014–15	Tatiana Smirnova	Irina Kolesnikova	Natalia Ilenkova	Liudmila Murova	Ekaterina Priemskaja	Vadim Raev	WSCC 2015 (11th)
2015–16	Tatiana Smirnova (fourth)	Irina Kolesnikova	Natalia Ilenkova	Liudmila Murova (skip)	Ekaterina Priemskaja	Vadim Raev	WSCC 2016 (9th)
2016–17	Tatiana Smirnova	Irina Kolesnikova	Natalia Ilenkova	Ekaterina Priemskaja	Liudmila Murova		WSCC 2017 (6th)
2017–18	Tatiana Smirnova	Irina Kolesnikova	Natalia Ilenkova	Ekaterina Priemskaja	Liudmila Murova	Alexandr Badilin	WSCC 2018 (10th)
2018–19	Tatiana Smirnova	Irina Kolesnikova	Natalia Ilenkova	Ekaterina Priemskaja	Liudmila Murova	Yana Nekrasova	WSCC 2019 (11th)

== Record as a coach of national teams ==
Year	Tournament, event	National team	Place
1997	1997 European Curling Championships	Russia (men)	15
2010	2010 World Senior Curling Championships	Russia (senior men)	9
2010	2010 World Mixed Doubles Curling Championship	Russia (mixed doubles)	1st place, gold medalist(s)
2011	2011 European Mixed Curling Championship	Russia (mixed)	13
2013	2013 World Junior Curling Championships	Russia (junior women)	1st place, gold medalist(s)
2013	2013 World Mixed Doubles Curling Championship	Russia (mixed doubles)	9
2014	2014 World Junior Curling Championships	Russia (junior women)	3rd place, bronze medalist(s)
2014	2014 World Mixed Doubles Curling Championship	Russia (mixed doubles)	6
2015	2015 World Junior Curling Championships	Russia (junior women)	7
2016	2016 World Junior B Curling Championships	Russia (junior women)	1st place, gold medalist(s)
2016	2016 World Junior Curling Championships	Russia (junior women)	7
2018	2018 Winter Olympics	Olympic Athletes from Russia (women)	9
2018	2018 World Women's Curling Championship	Russia (women)	3rd place, bronze medalist(s)
2018	2018 European Curling Championships	Russia (women)	4
2019	2019 World Women's Curling Championship	Russia (women)	5
2019	2019 European Curling Championships	Russia (women)	4
2021	2021 World Women's Curling Championship	RCF (women)	2nd place, silver medalist(s)
