= Taymyr constituency =

Russian legislative constituency

Taymyr single-member constituency
- Constituency of the Russian State Duma

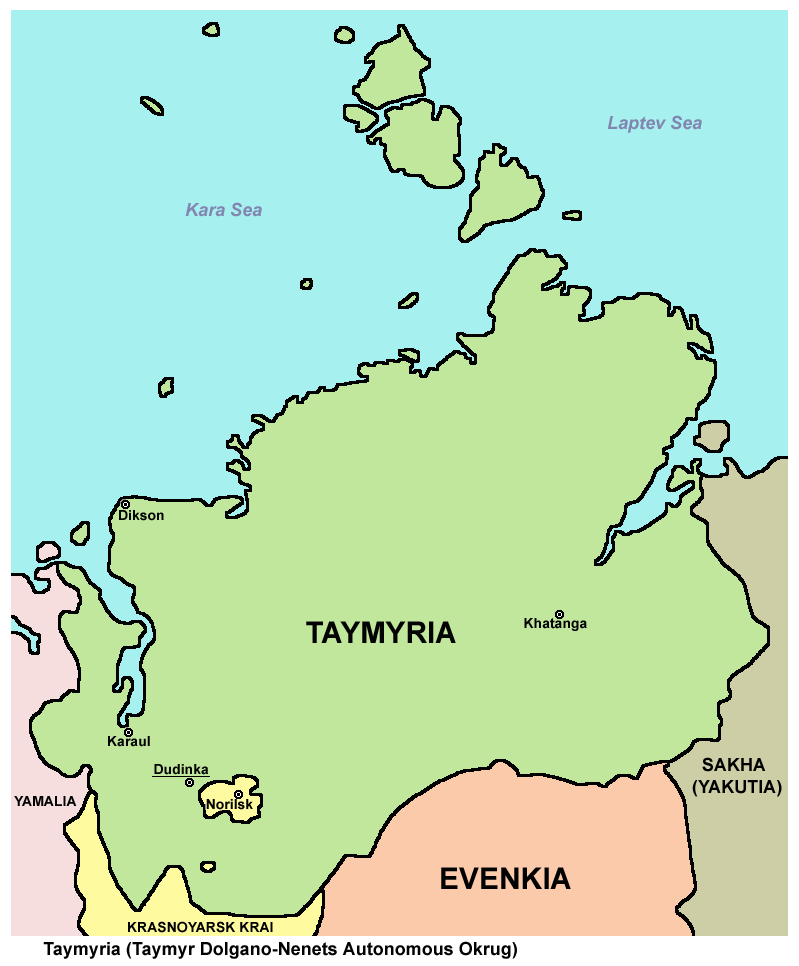
- Constituency boundaries from 1993 to 2007
- Deputy: None
- Federal subject: Taymyr Autonomous Okrug
- Districts: Diksonsky, Dudinka, Khatangsky, Ust-Yeniseysky
- Voters: 29,597 (2003)

The Taymyr constituency (No.219) was a Russian legislative constituency in the Taymyr Autonomous Okrug in 1993–2007. It encompassed the entire territory of Taymyr Autonomous Okrug. The seat was last occupied by United Russia deputy Viktor Sitnov, former Chairman of the Duma of the Taymyr Autonomous Okrug and Nornickel executive, who won the open-seat race in the 2003 election.

The constituency was dissolved in 2007 when State Duma adopted full proportional representation for the next two electoral cycles. Earlier in 2007 Taymyr Autonomous Okrug and neighbouring Evenk Autonomous Okrug were merged with Krasnoyarsk Krai. Currently the territory of the former Taymyr constituency is part of the Yeniseysk constituency.

== Boundaries ==
1993–2007: Diksonsky District, Dudinka, Khatangsky District, Ust-Yeniseysky District
The constituency had been covering the entirety of Taymyr Autonomous Okrug since its initial creation in 1993.

== Members elected ==
Election	Member	Party
1993	Aleksandr Vasilyev	Independent
1995	Nikolay Piskun	Independent
1999	Nikolay Piskun	Our Home – Russia
2003	Viktor Sitnov	United Russia

== Election results ==
=== 1993 ===
==== Declared candidates ====
- Aleksandr Chernyavsky (Independent), Dudinka sea port union leader
- Valentina Novikeyeva (Independent), teacher
- Aleksandr Vasilyev (Independent), First Deputy Mayor of Dudinka (1991–present)

==== Results ====
Summary of the 12 December 1993 Russian legislative election in the Taymyr constituency
Candidate	Party	Votes	%
Aleksandr Vasilyev	Independent	4,586	26.38%
Valentina Novikeyeva	Independent	–	23.74%
Aleksandr Chernyavsky	Independent	–	–
Total		17,378	100%

=== 1995 ===
==== Declared candidates ====
- Sergey Kirgizov (Independent), militsiya officer
- Irina Levenets (LDPR), party coordinator in Norilsk
- Valery Marushchak (BSG), thermal power station shift supervisor
- Yelena Medvedkova (DVR-OD), chairwoman of the Russian Party of Social Democracy executive committee
- Viktor Nasedkin (NDR), military electronics plant director
- Yelena Panina (Zemsky Sobor), local self-government activist
- Nikolay Piskun (Independent), First Deputy Governor of Taymyr Autonomous Okrug (1990–present)
- Igor Priymak (Independent), former Member of Krasnoyarsk Krai Council of People's Deputies (1990–1993), mining explosives engineer

==== Declined ====
- Aleksandr Vasilyev (Yabloko), incumbent Member of State Duma (1994–present)

==== Results ====
Summary of the 17 December 1995 Russian legislative election in the Taymyr constituency
Candidate	Party	Votes	%
Nikolay Piskun	Independent	4,553	26.22%
Yelena Panina	Zemsky Sobor	4,422	25.47%
Viktor Nasedkin	Our Home – Russia	2,631	15.15%
Irina Levenets	Liberal Democratic Party	1,177	6.78%
Sergey Kirgizov	Independent	868	5.00%
Igor Priymak	Independent	748	4.31%
Valery Marushchak	Stanislav Govorukhin Bloc	517	2.98%
Yelena Medvedkova	Democratic Choice of Russia – United Democrats	350	2.02%
against all		1,801	10.37%
Total		17,362	100%

=== 1999 ===
==== Declared candidates ====
- Anatoly Filatov (Independent), former Member of Federation Council (1994–1996), former president of Norilsk Nickel (1989–1996)
- Vladimir Grishin (KRO-Boldyrev), aide to State Duma member
- Pyotr Kucherenko (Independent), aide to State Duma member
- Adnan Muzykayev (Independent), First Deputy Chairman of the Moscow City Committee on Public and Inter-Regional Relations (1998–present)
- Viktor Nasedkin (Independent), former military electronics plant director, 1995 NDR candidate for this seat
- Nikolay Piskun (NDR), incumbent Member of State Duma (1996–present)
- Vladimir Shtol (DN), chairman of the Spiritual Heritage executive committee, international relations strategist
- Gennady Subbotkin (LDPR), Member of Duma of the Taymyr Autonomous Okrug (1995–present), 1996 gubernatorial candidate

==== Failed to qualify ====
- Mikhail Yemelyanov (RSP), chairman of the party regional office

==== Results ====
Summary of the 19 December 1999 Russian legislative election in the Taymyr constituency
Candidate	Party	Votes	%
Nikolay Piskun (incumbent)	Our Home – Russia	3,804	23.25%
Viktor Nasedkin	Independent	3,134	19.15%
Pyotr Kucherenko	Independent	1,886	11.53%
Adnan Muzykayev	Independent	1,117	6.83%
Gennady Subbotkin	Liberal Democratic Party	1,102	6.74%
Vladimir Grishin	Congress of Russian Communities-Yury Boldyrev Movement	1,029	6.29%
Anatoly Filatov	Independent	1,007	6.15%
Vladimir Shtol	Spiritual Heritage	117	0.72%
against all		2,792	17.06%
Total		16,362	100%

=== 2003 ===
==== Declared candidates ====
- Nikolay Lovelius (ORP Rus'), aide to State Duma member Nikolay Piskun, geographer
- Sergey Lykov (LDPR), businessman
- Oleg Pantela (Independent), Ministry of Justice regional office chief specialist
- Sergey Simutin (Independent), former Member of Duma of the Taymyr Autonomous Okrug (1995–1999)
- Viktor Sitnov (United Russia), Chairman of the Duma of the Taymyr Autonomous Okrug (1999–present), former People's Deputy of Russia (1990–1993)
- Vadim Vaulin (Independent), Taymyr Autonomous Okrug administration official

==== Withdrawn candidates ====
- Nikolay Piskun (NPRF), incumbent Member of State Duma (1996–present)

==== Did not file ====
- Anatoly Kuznetsov (Independent), Mayor of Dudinka (2001–present)
- Tatyana Tsarkova (Independent), regional ethnic culture centre official
- Artur Varnakov (Independent), Deputy Chairman of the Dudinka City Assembly (2001–present)

==== Results ====
Summary of the 7 December 2003 Russian legislative election in the Taymyr constituency
Candidate	Party	Votes	%
Viktor Sitnov	United Russia	9,162	59.60%
Vadim Vaulin	Independent	1,093	7.11%
Oleg Pantela	Independent	812	5.28%
Nikolay Lovelius	United Russian Party Rus'	406	2.64%
Sergey Simutin	Independent	374	2.43%
Sergey Lykov	Liberal Democratic Party	258	1.68%
against all		3,053	19.86%
Total		15,381	100%
