= Administrative divisions of Taymyr Autonomous Okrug =

Taymyr Dolgano-Nenets Autonomous Okrug
- Autonomous Okrug
- Таймырский автономный округ
- Flag Coat of arms

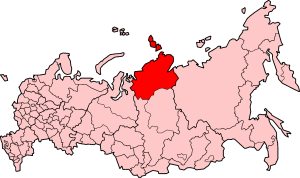
- Country: Russia
- Federal district: Siberian
- Economic region: East Siberian
- Capital: Dudinka

Government
  - Body: Duma
  - Last Governor: Oleg Budargin

Area
  - Total: 879,929 km^{2} (339,742 sq mi)
  - Rank: 7th

Population
  - Estimate (2007): 38,372
- Time zone: UTC+
- Official languages: Russian

Taymyr Autonomous Okrug was a federal subject of Russia until December 31, 2006. On January 1, 2007, it was merged into Krasnoyarsk Krai along with Evenk Autonomous Okrug. During the transitional period it retains a special status within Krasnoyarsk Krai.

== List ==
- Towns under the autonomous okrug's jurisdiction:
  - Dudinka (Дудинка) (administrative center)
    - with 6 selsovets under the town's jurisdiction.
- Districts:
  - Diksonsky (Диксонский)
    - Urban-type settlements under the district's jurisdiction:
      - Dikson (Диксон)
  - Khatangsky (Хатангский)
    - with 10 selsovets under the district's jurisdiction.
  - Ust-Yeniseysky (Усть-Енисейский)
    - with 5 selsovets under the district's jurisdiction.
  - Dudinsky (Дудинский)

== Summary table ==
| Taymyr Autonomous Okrug, Russia |
As of December 31, 2006:
| # of districts (районы) | 4 |
| # of towns (города) | 1 |
| # of urban-type settlements (посёлки городского типа) | 1 |
| # of selsovets (сельсоветы) | 21 |
As of 2002:
| # of rural localities (сельские населённые пункты) | 27 |
| # of uninhabited rural localities (сельские населённые пункты без населения) | 2 |

== See also ==
- Administrative divisions of Krasnoyarsk Krai
- Administrative divisions of Evenk Autonomous Okrug
