= WCT Arctic Cup =

World Curling Tour event

- Host city: Dudinka, Russia
- Arena: Taimyr Ice Arena
- Current men's winner: (Russia) Alexey Stukalskiy
- Current women's winner: (Scotland) Eve Muirhead
- Current mixed doubles winner: (Switzerland) Briar Hürlimann / Yannick Schwaller
- Current open winner: (Russia) Sergey Glukhov
- Current: 2022 Nornickel Curling Cup

The WCT Arctic Cup (previously known as the Taimyr Cup, the CCT Arctic Cup and the Nornickel Curling Cup) is an annual bonspiel, or curling tournament, that takes place in late May at the Taimyr Ice Arena in Dudinka, Russia. The tournament is held in a Round Robin format. The tournament is part of the World Curling Tour. In 2016, the inaugural event was held between Russian men's teams. In 2017 and 2019 it was a women's event, and in 2018 and 2021 it was a mixed doubles event. In 2022, it was held in an open entry format where men's and women's teams competed against each other.

== Men's champions ==
Year	Winning team	Runner up team	Third place	Fourth place	Purse (USD)
2016	(Russia) Alexey Stukalskiy, Andrey Drozdov, Artur Razhabov, Anton Kalalb, Petr Dron	(Russia) Alexander Eremin (Fourth), Mikhail Vaskov (Skip), Alexey Tuzov, Alexey Kulikov	(Russia) Alexey Tselousov, Evgeny Klimov, Alexey Timofeev, Artem Shmakov, Alexey Bystrov	(Russia) Roman Kutuzov, Sergey Glukhov, Aleksandr Kozyrev, Dmitry Mironov	

== Women's champions ==
Year	Winning team	Runner up team	Third place	Fourth place	Purse (USD)
2017	(Russia) Anna Sidorova, Margarita Fomina, Alexandra Raeva, Nkeirouka Ezekh, Alina Kovaleva	(Canada) Jennifer Jones, Kaitlyn Lawes, Jill Officer, Dawn McEwen, Elaine Jackson	(Russia) Victoria Moiseeva, Uliana Vasilyeva, Galina Arsenkina, Julia Guzieva, Yulia Portunova	(Switzerland) Alina Pätz, Nadine Lehmann, Marisa Winkelhausen, Nicole Schwägli	$100,000
2019	(Scotland) Eve Muirhead, Lauren Gray, Vicky Wright, Vicki Chalmers	(Russia) Alina Kovaleva, Anastasia Bryzgalova, Galina Arsenkina, Ekaterina Kuzmina, Uliana Vasilyeva	(Canada) Kerri Einarson, Val Sweeting, Shannon Birchard, Briane Meilleur	(Russia) Anna Sidorova, Margarita Fomina, Yulia Portunova, Julia Guzieva, Nkeirouka Ezekh	$50,000

== Mixed doubles champions ==
Year	Winning pair	Runner up pair	Third place	Fourth place	Purse (USD)
2018	(Canada) Rachel Homan / (Sweden) Niklas Edin	(Scotland) Gina Aitken / Duncan Menzies	(Russia) Maria Komarova / Daniil Goriachev	(Czech Republic) Zuzana Hájková / Tomáš Paul	$20,000
2020	Cancelled				
2021	(Switzerland) Briar Hürlimann / Yannick Schwaller	(Russia) Anna Samoylik / Mikhail Vaskov	(Russia) Alina Kovaleva / Sergey Glukhov	(Italy) Diana Gaspari / Joël Retornaz	€ 20,000

== Open event champions ==
Year	Winning team	Runner up team	Third place	Fourth place	Purse (USD)
2022	(Russia) Sergey Glukhov, Evgeny Klimov, Dmitry Mironov, Anton Kalalb	(Russia) Alexey Stukalskiy, Artur Ali, Petr Dron, Daniil Goriachev, Alexander Eremin	(Russia) Alina Kovaleva, Yulia Portunova, Galina Arsenkina, Ekaterina Kuzmina, Maria Komarova	(Russia) Anna Sidorova, Margarita Fomina, Nkeirouka Ezekh, Ekaterina Galkina	
