= 2018 WCT Arctic Cup =

World Curling Tour event

- Host city: Dudinka, Russia
- Arena: Taimyr Ice Arena
- Dates: May 24–27
- Winner: (Canada) (Sweden) Homan / Edin
- Female: Rachel Homan
- Male: Niklas Edin
- Finalist: (Scotland) Aitken / Menzies

The 2018 WCT Arctic Cup, a mixed doubles curling event on the World Curling Tour, was held May 24 to 27 at the Taimyr Ice Arena in Dudinka, Russia. It was the final event of the 2017–18 curling season. The total purse for the event was $US 20,000.

In the final, the duo of Rachel Homan from Canada and Niklas Edin from Sweden defeated the Scottish pair of Gina Aitken and Duncan Menzies 7–6 to claim the championship title. Maria Komarova and Daniil Goriachev from Russia secured third place in the tournament with an 8–3 victory over Zuzana Hájková and Tomáš Paul from Czech Republic.

== Teams ==
The teams are listed as follows:

Female	Male	Locale
Gina Aitken	Duncan Menzies	Stirling, Scotland
Anastasia Bryzgalova	Alexey Timofeev	Moscow, Russia
Joanne Courtney	Reid Carruthers	Alberta & Manitoba, Canada
Zuzana Hájková	Tomáš Paul	Prague, Czech Republic
Rachel Homan	Niklas Edin	Alberta, Canada / Karlstad, Sweden
Eszter Juhász	Markku Uusipaavalniemi	Hyvinkää, Finland
Maria Komarova	Daniil Goriachev	Moscow, Russia
Jenny Perret	Matthias Perret	Zürich, Switzerland
Anna Venevtseva	Vasiliy Groshev	Krasnoyarsk, Russia
Malin Wendel	Fabian Wingfors	Gothenburg, Sweden

== Round robin standings ==
Final round robin standings

Key
Teams to Playoffs

Pool A	W	L
(Scotland) Aitken / Menzies	3	1
(Czech Republic) Hájková / Paul	3	1
(Russia) Bryzgalova / Timofeev	2	2
(Canada) Courtney / Carruthers	2	2
(Sweden) Wendel / Wingfors	0	4

Pool B	W	L
(Canada) (Sweden) Homan / Edin	3	1
(Russia) Komarova / Goriachev	3	1
(Finland) Juhász / Uusipaavalniemi	3	1
(Switzerland) Perret / Perret	1	3
(Russia) Venevtseva / Groshev	0	4

== Round robin results ==
All draw times are listed in Krasnoyarsk Standard Time (UTC+07:00).

=== Draw 1 ===
Thursday, May 24, 15:00

Sheet A	1	2	3	4	5	6	7	8	Final
(Scotland) Aitken / Menzies	1	0	3	0	3	0	3	X	10
(Sweden) Wendel / Wingfors	0	1	0	1	0	1	0	X	3

Sheet B	1	2	3	4	5	6	7	8	Final
(Czech Republic) Hájková / Paul	0	0	2	4	0	1	1	0	8
(Canada) Courtney / Carruthers	2	1	0	0	2	0	0	1	6

=== Draw 2 ===
Thursday, May 24, 17:30

Sheet A	1	2	3	4	5	6	7	8	9	Final
(Russia) Venevtseva / Groshev	0	1	0	0	2	0	0	2	0	5
(Switzerland) Perret / Perret	2	0	1	1	0	0	1	0	3	8

Sheet B	1	2	3	4	5	6	7	8	Final
(Finland) Juhász / Uusipaavalniemi	0	3	0	0	3	1	0	2	9
(Canada) (Sweden) Homan / Edin	1	0	2	3	0	0	2	0	8

=== Draw 3 ===
Friday, May 25, 09:00

Sheet A	1	2	3	4	5	6	7	8	9	Final
(Sweden) Wendel / Wingfors	2	0	4	1	0	1	0	1	0	9
(Czech Republic) Hájková / Paul	0	4	0	0	1	0	4	0	2	11

Sheet B	1	2	3	4	5	6	7	8	Final
(Russia) Bryzgalova / Timofeev	1	1	1	0	3	0	2	X	8
(Scotland) Aitken / Menzies	0	0	0	2	0	2	0	X	4

=== Draw 4 ===
Friday, May 25, 12:00

Sheet A	1	2	3	4	5	6	7	8	Final
(Switzerland) Perret / Perret	0	3	0	2	0	0	1	0	6
(Finland) Juhász / Uusipaavalniemi	1	0	2	0	1	1	0	4	9

Sheet B	1	2	3	4	5	6	7	8	Final
(Russia) Komarova / Goriachev	1	2	1	0	2	0	4	X	10
(Russia) Venevtseva / Groshev	0	0	0	1	0	1	0	X	2

=== Draw 5 ===
Friday, May 25, 16:30

Sheet A	1	2	3	4	5	6	7	8	Final
(Canada) Courtney / Carruthers	0	0	1	0	3	0	1	1	6
(Scotland) Aitken / Menzies	2	2	0	2	0	1	0	0	7

Sheet B	1	2	3	4	5	6	7	8	Final
(Sweden) Wendel / Wingfors	0	2	0	0	1	1	0	X	4
(Russia) Bryzgalova / Timofeev	5	0	2	2	0	0	4	X	13

=== Draw 6 ===
Friday, May 25, 19:30

Sheet A	1	2	3	4	5	6	7	8	9	Final
(Canada) (Sweden) Homan / Edin	2	1	0	2	0	1	0	0	3	9
(Russia) Venevtseva / Groshev	0	0	1	0	1	0	3	1	0	6

Sheet B	1	2	3	4	5	6	7	8	Final
(Switzerland) Perret / Perret	0	2	0	2	0	1	1	0	6
(Russia) Komarova / Goriachev	1	0	1	0	3	0	0	3	8

=== Draw 7 ===
Saturday, May 26, 09:00

Sheet A	1	2	3	4	5	6	7	8	Final
(Czech Republic) Hájková / Paul	0	2	1	2	2	0	0	1	8
(Russia) Bryzgalova / Timofeev	2	0	0	0	0	3	1	0	6

Sheet B	1	2	3	4	5	6	7	8	Final
(Canada) Courtney / Carruthers	3	2	2	0	2	0	1	X	10
(Sweden) Wendel / Wingfors	0	0	0	3	0	1	0	X	4

=== Draw 8 ===
Saturday, May 26, 12:00

Sheet A	1	2	3	4	5	6	7	8	Final
(Finland) Juhász / Uusipaavalniemi	0	0	0	0	1	2	1	0	4
(Russia) Komarova / Goriachev	1	1	1	2	0	0	0	2	7

Sheet B	1	2	3	4	5	6	7	8	Final
(Canada) (Sweden) Homan / Edin	1	0	3	0	3	0	3	X	10
(Switzerland) Perret / Perret	0	1	0	2	0	2	0	X	5

=== Draw 9 ===
Saturday, May 26, 16:00

Sheet A	1	2	3	4	5	6	7	8	Final
(Russia) Bryzgalova / Timofeev	2	0	0	0	0	0	2	X	4
(Canada) Courtney / Carruthers	0	2	1	1	1	2	0	X	7

Sheet B	1	2	3	4	5	6	7	8	9	Final
(Scotland) Aitken / Menzies	0	0	1	2	0	1	0	2	1	7
(Czech Republic) Hájková / Paul	1	2	0	0	1	0	2	0	0	6

=== Draw 10 ===
Saturday, May 26, 19:00

Sheet A	1	2	3	4	5	6	7	8	Final
(Russia) Komarova / Goriachev	0	1	1	1	0	3	1	0	7
(Canada) (Sweden) Homan / Edin	4	0	0	0	2	0	0	2	8

Sheet B	1	2	3	4	5	6	7	8	Final
(Russia) Venevtseva / Groshev	0	0	0	3	1	1	1	0	6
(Finland) Juhász / Uusipaavalniemi	3	1	1	0	0	0	0	2	7

== Playoffs ==
Semifinals
A1	(Scotland) Aitken / Menzies	7
B2	(Russia) Komarova / Goriachev	6
B1	(Canada) (Sweden) Homan / Edin	11
A2	(Czech Republic) Hájková / Paul	7

Final
A1	(Scotland) Aitken / Menzies	6
B1	(Canada) (Sweden) Homan / Edin	7

Third place game
B2	(Russia) Komarova / Goriachev	8
A2	(Czech Republic) Hájková / Paul	3

=== Semifinals ===
Sunday, May 27, 09:00

Sheet A	1	2	3	4	5	6	7	8	Final
(Scotland) Aitken / Menzies	2	0	0	1	3	0	0	1	7
(Russia) Komarova / Goriachev	0	2	1	0	0	2	1	0	6

Sheet B	1	2	3	4	5	6	7	8	Final
(Canada) (Sweden) Homan / Edin	0	0	3	1	0	2	0	5	11
(Czech Republic) Hájková / Paul	2	2	0	0	1	0	2	0	7

=== Third place game ===
Sunday, May 27, 14:00

Sheet B	1	2	3	4	5	6	7	8	Final
(Russia) Komarova / Goriachev	2	2	0	1	0	2	1	X	8
(Czech Republic) Hájková / Paul	0	0	1	0	2	0	0	X	3

=== Final ===
Sunday, May 27, 14:00

Sheet A	1	2	3	4	5	6	7	8	Final
(Scotland) Aitken / Menzies	0	1	0	3	1	0	1	0	6
(Canada) (Sweden) Homan / Edin	1	0	2	0	0	3	0	1	7
