= 2021 WCT Arctic Cup =

World Curling Tour event

- Host city: Dudinka, Russia
- Arena: Taimyr Ice Arena
- Dates: May 27–30
- Winner: (Switzerland) Hürlimann / Schwaller
- Female: Briar Hürlimann
- Male: Yannick Schwaller
- Finalist: (Russia) Samoylik / Vaskov

The 2021 WCT Arctic Cup, a mixed doubles curling event on the World Curling Tour, was held May 27 to 30 at the Taimyr Ice Arena in Dudinka, Russia. It was the final event of the 2020–21 curling season. The total purse for the event was € 20,000. The event was originally scheduled for November 4 to 9, 2020, however, it was moved to the end of May due to the COVID-19 pandemic.

In the final, the reigning Swiss mixed doubles champions Briar Hürlimann and Yannick Schwaller secured a 9–2 victory over the Russian team of Anna Samoylik and Mikhail Vaskov. Hürlimann and Schwaller finished 3–1 through the round robin and defeated the Italian duo of Diana Gaspari and Joël Retornaz 6–4 to advance to the championship game. Samoylik and Vaskov also went 3–1 through the group stage and upset the previously undefeated team of Alina Kovaleva and Sergey Glukhov 10–5 to reach the final. In the third place game, Kovaleva and Glukhov defeated Gaspari and Retornaz 10–5.

== Teams ==
The teams are listed as follows:

Female	Male	Locale
Sofie Bergman	Fredrik Nyman	Stocksund & Leksand, Sweden
Nkeirouka Ezekh	Alexey Stukalskiy	Moscow, Russia
Diana Gaspari	Joël Retornaz	Cortina d'Ampezzo & Pinerolo, Italy
Briar Hürlimann	Yannick Schwaller	Solothurn, Switzerland
Karoliine Kaare	Harri Lill	Tallinn, Estonia
Alina Kovaleva	Sergey Glukhov	Saint Petersburg, Russia
Daria Morozova	Oleg Krasikov	Dmitrov & Saint Petersburg, Russia
Anna Samoylik	Mikhail Vaskov	Krasnoyarsk & Dmitrov, Russia
Anna Sidorova	Alexey Timofeev	Moscow & Saint Petersburg, Russia
Ildikó Szekeres	György Nagy	Budapest, Hungary

== Round robin standings ==
Final Round Robin Standings

Key
Teams to Playoffs

Pool A	W	L	DSC
(Russia) Kovaleva / Glukhov	4	0	53.91
(Switzerland) Hürlimann / Schwaller	3	1	60.73
(Russia) Ezekh / Stukalskiy	2	2	66.30
(Russia) Morozova / Krasikov	1	3	52.71
(Estonia) Kaare / Lill	0	4	38.56

Pool B	W	L	DSC
(Italy) Gaspari / Retornaz	3	1	68.54
(Russia) Samoylik / Vaskov	3	1	94.83
(Russia) Sidorova / Timofeev	2	2	46.81
(Sweden) Bergman / Nyman	1	3	63.93
(Hungary) Szekeres / Nagy	1	3	75.18

== Round robin results ==
All draw times are listed in Krasnoyarsk Standard Time (UTC+07:00).

=== Draw 1 ===
Thursday, May 27, 16:00

Sheet A	1	2	3	4	5	6	7	8	Final
(Russia) Kovaleva / Glukhov	0	2	1	2	1	0	0	2	8
(Estonia) Kaare / Lill 🔨	2	0	0	0	0	4	1	0	7

Sheet B	1	2	3	4	5	6	7	8	Final
(Russia) Ezekh / Stukalskiy	0	0	1	3	0	0	2	1	7
(Russia) Morozova / Krasikov 🔨	1	1	0	0	2	1	0	0	5

=== Draw 2 ===
Thursday, May 27, 19:00

Sheet A	1	2	3	4	5	6	7	8	Final
(Hungary) Szekeres / Nagy	0	0	0	0	1	0	0	X	1
(Italy) Gaspari / Retornaz 🔨	1	1	1	1	0	1	2	X	7

Sheet B	1	2	3	4	5	6	7	8	Final
(Russia) Sidorova / Timofeev	1	1	1	1	0	2	2	X	8
(Sweden) Bergman / Nyman 🔨	0	0	0	0	1	0	0	X	1

=== Draw 3 ===
Friday, May 28, 12:00

Sheet A	1	2	3	4	5	6	7	8	Final
(Estonia) Kaare / Lill	0	0	2	0	0	0	X	X	2
(Russia) Ezekh / Stukalskiy 🔨	1	1	0	3	2	1	X	X	8

Sheet B	1	2	3	4	5	6	7	8	Final
(Switzerland) Hürlimann / Schwaller	0	3	0	0	0	3	0	0	6
(Russia) Kovaleva / Glukhov 🔨	2	0	3	1	1	0	1	2	10

=== Draw 4 ===
Friday, May 28, 16:00

Sheet A	1	2	3	4	5	6	7	8	Final
(Italy) Gaspari / Retornaz 🔨	0	0	0	2	0	1	0	X	3
(Russia) Sidorova / Timofeev	3	1	1	0	2	0	2	X	9

Sheet B	1	2	3	4	5	6	7	8	Final
(Russia) Samoylik / Vaskov	2	0	0	3	0	4	0	X	9
(Hungary) Szekeres / Nagy 🔨	0	3	1	0	1	0	2	X	7

=== Draw 5 ===
Friday, May 28, 19:00

Sheet A	1	2	3	4	5	6	7	8	Final
(Russia) Morozova / Krasikov 🔨	0	1	0	1	0	2	1	0	5
(Russia) Kovaleva / Glukhov	1	0	2	0	2	0	0	1	6

Sheet B	1	2	3	4	5	6	7	8	9	Final
(Estonia) Kaare / Lill 🔨	0	1	0	2	1	0	3	0	0	7
(Switzerland) Hürlimann / Schwaller	1	0	2	0	0	3	0	1	2	9

=== Draw 6 ===
Saturday, May 29, 08:30

Sheet A	1	2	3	4	5	6	7	8	Final
(Sweden) Bergman / Nyman 🔨	3	2	2	2	0	0	0	X	9
(Hungary) Szekeres / Nagy	0	0	0	0	2	1	1	X	4

Sheet B	1	2	3	4	5	6	7	8	9	Final
(Italy) Gaspari / Retornaz	0	1	0	0	3	1	0	1	1	7
(Russia) Samoylik / Vaskov 🔨	1	0	2	2	0	0	1	0	0	6

=== Draw 7 ===
Saturday, May 29, 11:30

Sheet A	1	2	3	4	5	6	7	8	Final
(Russia) Ezekh / Stukalskiy	0	3	0	0	2	0	1	0	6
(Switzerland) Hürlimann / Schwaller 🔨	2	0	2	1	0	2	0	3	10

Sheet B	1	2	3	4	5	6	7	8	Final
(Russia) Morozova / Krasikov	1	0	1	0	3	0	3	X	8
(Estonia) Kaare / Lill 🔨	0	1	0	1	0	1	0	X	3

=== Draw 8 ===
Saturday, May 29, 14:30

Sheet A	1	2	3	4	5	6	7	8	Final
(Russia) Sidorova / Timofeev 🔨	1	0	1	0	0	2	0	1	5
(Russia) Samoylik / Vaskov	0	1	0	3	2	0	1	0	7

Sheet B	1	2	3	4	5	6	7	8	Final
(Sweden) Bergman / Nyman	0	4	0	1	0	0	0	0	5
(Italy) Gaspari / Retornaz 🔨	1	0	1	0	2	2	2	3	11

=== Draw 9 ===
Saturday, May 29, 17:30

Sheet A	1	2	3	4	5	6	7	8	9	Final
(Switzerland) Hürlimann / Schwaller 🔨	1	0	0	1	0	1	0	2	1	6
(Russia) Morozova / Krasikov	0	1	1	0	1	0	2	0	0	5

Sheet B	1	2	3	4	5	6	7	8	Final
(Russia) Kovaleva / Glukhov 🔨	1	0	1	1	0	2	0	2	7
(Russia) Ezekh / Stukalskiy	0	1	0	0	1	0	4	0	6

=== Draw 10 ===
Saturday, May 29, 20:30

Sheet A	1	2	3	4	5	6	7	8	Final
(Russia) Samoylik / Vaskov	1	2	1	0	1	0	3	X	8
(Sweden) Bergman / Nyman 🔨	0	0	0	1	0	1	0	X	2

Sheet B	1	2	3	4	5	6	7	8	Final
(Hungary) Szekeres / Nagy	0	2	4	4	0	1	0	X	11
(Russia) Sidorova / Timofeev 🔨	1	0	0	0	1	0	1	X	3

== Playoffs ==
Semifinals
A1	(Russia) Kovaleva / Glukhov	5
B2	(Russia) Samoylik / Vaskov	10
B1	(Italy) Gaspari / Retornaz	4
A2	(Switzerland) Hürlimann / Schwaller	6

Final
B2	(Russia) Samoylik / Vaskov	2
A2	(Switzerland) Hürlimann / Schwaller	9

Third place game
A1	(Russia) Kovaleva / Glukhov	10
B1	(Italy) Gaspari / Retornaz	5

=== Semifinals ===
Sunday, May 30, 10:00

Sheet A	1	2	3	4	5	6	7	8	Final
(Italy) Gaspari / Retornaz	0	3	0	0	0	0	1	0	4
(Switzerland) Hürlimann / Schwaller 🔨	1	0	1	1	1	1	0	1	6

Sheet B	1	2	3	4	5	6	7	8	Final
(Russia) Kovaleva / Glukhov	1	0	2	0	1	0	1	X	5
(Russia) Samoylik / Vaskov 🔨	0	2	0	4	0	4	0	X	10

=== Third place game ===
Sunday, May 30, 13:00

Sheet A	1	2	3	4	5	6	7	8	Final
(Russia) Kovaleva / Glukhov 🔨	1	2	0	2	0	2	1	2	10
(Italy) Gaspari / Retornaz	0	0	1	0	4	0	0	0	5

=== Final ===
Sunday, May 30, 13:00

Sheet B	1	2	3	4	5	6	7	8	Final
(Russia) Samoylik / Vaskov	1	0	1	0	0	0	0	X	2
(Switzerland) Hürlimann / Schwaller 🔨	0	1	0	2	3	2	1	X	9
