= Flag of Taymyr Autonomous Okrug =

Flag of Taymyr Autonomous Okrug

The flag of Taymyr Autonomous Okrug, a former region in Russia, was a light blue field charged in the center with a white disc (surrounded by four rays at the cardinal positions), which is one half of the flag in width. The disc, in turn, is charged with a red-breasted goose in the center.

The flag was authorized on 23 June 2000, prior to the okrug's merge to Krasnoyarsk Krai on 1 January 2007. Its proportions were 2:3.
