= Diksonsky District =

Flag of Diksonsky District

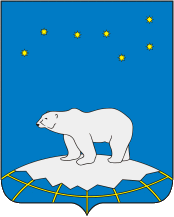
Coat of arms of Diksonsky District

Diksonsky district was a former district (raion) of the former Taymyr (Dolgan-Nenets) Autonomous Okrug which was merged into Krasnoyarsk Krai on 1 January 2007. The administrative centre of the district was the town of Dikson. The district covered an area of 200,419 km^{2}.

== Location ==
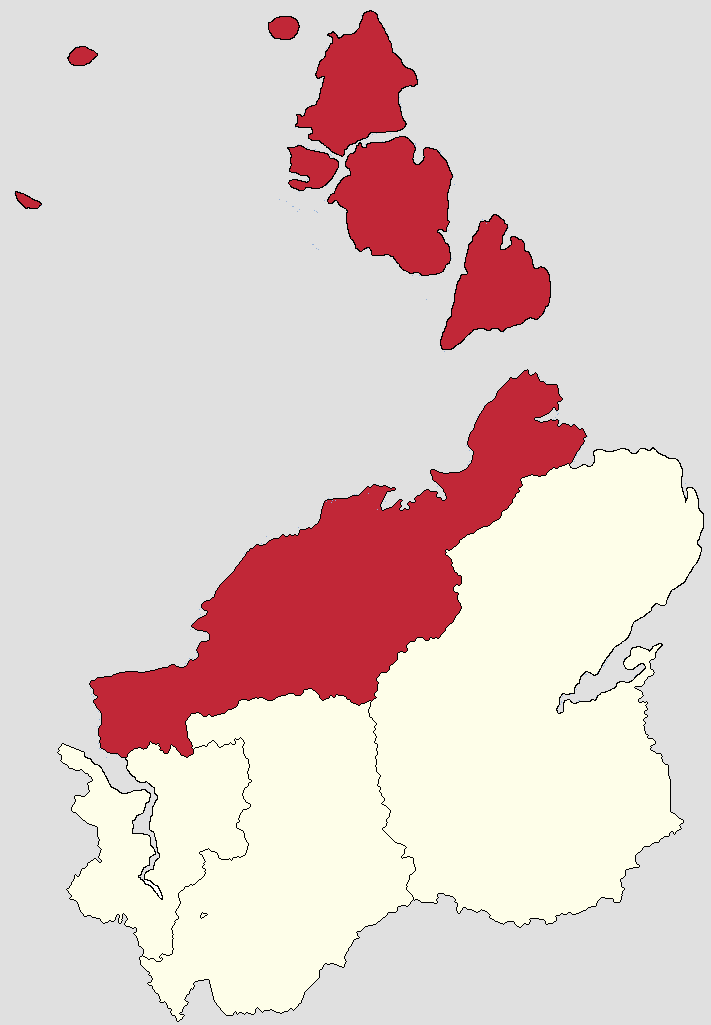
Diksonsky district on a map of Taymyria

Diksonsky district was located in the extreme north of the Taymyr Autonomous Okrug. The district comprised a large area of the okrug's northern coastline as well as almost all of the arctic islands subordinated to the region, most notably Severnaya Zemlya.

== Geography ==
The district is famed for having contained the most northerly point in mainland Russia and therefore the continent of Eurasia, Cape Chelyuskin. All of the land controlled by the district lay north of the Arctic Circle, as did all of Taymyr AO. It was situated at the mouth of the Yenisei River. It shared borders (from west to east) with the Ust-Yeniseisky, Dudinsky and Khatangsky districts of Taymyr AO.

== History ==
Diksonsky District was created in 1957 after separating from the Ust-Yeniseisky district, also in Taymyr AO. The only settlement in the district was the town of Dikson. The district did not have any further internal divisions or towns; the entirety of the district's population was in the town of Dikson, which served as the administrative centre. No other settlements are known to have existed within the district.

The Great Arctic Nature Reserve is located within the former territory of the district. It was created on 11 May 1993 by the Russian government and is the largest nature reserve in Russia and Eurasia. Covering an area of 4,169,222 ha, it stretches for over 1,000 kilometres from west to east and its latitude reaches much further north than 85°N.

Upon the merger of Taymyr AO and Krasnoyarsk Krai on 1 January 2007, Diksonsky district was abolished.

== Geography ==
When it existed, Diksonsky district was the most northerly district in all of mainland Russia, with territory lying no further south than 75°N. The district also contained the Byrranga Mountains, one of the most remote areas of the Arctic world.

== Demographics ==
=== Settlements ===
Diksonsky district contained only one settlement, the city of Dikson (postal code 647340) with a population of 861 as of 1 January 2017.

=== Population ===
The population of the town of Dikson consists of everyone in the former district's area. The population figures (since 1959) were:

- 1959: 3,470
- 1970: 3,889
- 1979: 4,045
- 1989: 4,449
- 2002: 1,198
- 2010: 590
