= 2017 CCT Arctic Cup =

World Curling Tour event

- Host city: Dudinka, Russia
- Arena: Taimyr Ice Arena
- Dates: May 19–21
- Winner: (Russia) Team Sidorova
- Curling club: Moskvitch CC, Moscow, Russia
- Skip: Anna Sidorova
- Third: Margarita Fomina
- Second: Alexandra Raeva
- Lead: Nkeirouka Ezekh
- Alternate: Alina Kovaleva
- Finalist: (Canada) Jennifer Jones

The 2017 CCT Arctic Cup was held May 19 to 21 at the Taimyr Ice Arena in Dudinka, Russia. The event was the second edition the Arctic Cup, and was officially the first event of the 2017-18 women's World Curling Tour (which typically begins in September). The event was won by the Russian national team, skipped by Anna Sidorova who defeated Canada's Jennifer Jones rink in the final. The total purse for the event was $US 100,000.

== Teams ==
The teams are listed as follows:

| Skip | Third | Second | Lead | Alternate | Locale |
|---|---|---|---|---|---|
| Jennifer Jones | Kaitlyn Lawes | Jill Officer | Dawn McEwen | Elaine Jackson | Winnipeg, Manitoba, Canada |
| Oona Kauste | Lotta Immonen | Eszter Juhász | Maija Salmiovirta | | Hyvinkää, Finland |
| Victoria Moiseeva | Uliana Vasilyeva | Galina Arsenkina | Julia Guzieva | Yulia Portunova | Saint Petersburg, Russia |
| Alina Pätz | Nadine Lehmann | Marisa Winkelhausen | Nicole Schwägli | | Zürich, Switzerland |
| Nina Roth | Tabitha Peterson | Aileen Geving | Becca Hamilton | Ann Swisshelm | Blaine, United States |
| Anna Sidorova | Margarita Fomina | Alexandra Raeva | Nkeirouka Ezekh | Alina Kovaleva | Moscow, Russia |
| Isabella Wranå (Fourth) | Christina Bertrup | Maria Wennerström | Margaretha Sigfridsson (Skip) | Fanny Sjöberg | Skellefteå, Sweden |
| Anna Venevtseva | Olga Zharkova | Anna Grushevskaya | Juldus Balakireva | Kristina Aleynikova | Dudinka, Russia |

== Round-robin standings ==
Final round-robin standings

Key
| Teams to Playoffs |

| Pool A | W | L |
|---|---|---|
| (Canada) Jennifer Jones | 3 | 0 |
| (Russia) Victoria Moiseeva | 2 | 1 |
| (Sweden) Margaretha Sigfridsson | 1 | 2 |
| (Russia) Anna Venevtseva | 0 | 3 |

| Pool B | W | L |
|---|---|---|
| (Russia) Anna Sidorova | 3 | 0 |
| (Switzerland) Alina Pätz | 2 | 1 |
| (Finland) Oona Kauste | 1 | 2 |
| (United States) Nina Roth | 0 | 3 |

== Round-robin results ==
All draw times are listed in Krasnoyarsk Standard Time (UTC+07:00).

=== Draw 1 ===
Friday, May 19, 10:00

| Sheet A | 1 | 2 | 3 | 4 | 5 | 6 | 7 | 8 | Final |
| (Canada) Jennifer Jones | 0 | 1 | 0 | 3 | 0 | 1 | 0 | X | 5 |
| (Russia) Anna Venevtseva | 1 | 0 | 1 | 0 | 1 | 0 | 0 | X | 3 |

| Sheet B | 1 | 2 | 3 | 4 | 5 | 6 | 7 | 8 | Final |
| (Sweden) Margaretha Sigfridsson | 0 | 1 | 0 | 0 | 2 | 2 | 0 | 0 | 5 |
| (Russia) Victoria Moiseeva | 3 | 0 | 1 | 1 | 0 | 0 | 2 | 1 | 8 |

=== Draw 2 ===
Friday, May 19, 13:30

| Sheet A | 1 | 2 | 3 | 4 | 5 | 6 | 7 | 8 | Final |
| (United States) Nina Roth | 0 | 0 | 1 | 0 | 0 | 0 | X | X | 1 |
| (Russia) Anna Sidorova | 0 | 1 | 0 | 1 | 1 | 4 | X | X | 7 |

| Sheet B | 1 | 2 | 3 | 4 | 5 | 6 | 7 | 8 | Final |
| (Finland) Oona Kauste | 0 | 0 | 0 | 0 | 0 | 0 | X | X | 0 |
| (Switzerland) Alina Pätz | 1 | 0 | 1 | 2 | 0 | 1 | X | X | 5 |

=== Draw 3 ===
Friday, May 19, 17:00

| Sheet A | 1 | 2 | 3 | 4 | 5 | 6 | 7 | 8 | Final |
| (Sweden) Margaretha Sigfridsson | 1 | 0 | 2 | 0 | 0 | 0 | 1 | X | 4 |
| (Canada) Jennifer Jones | 0 | 2 | 0 | 2 | 3 | 0 | 0 | X | 7 |

| Sheet B | 1 | 2 | 3 | 4 | 5 | 6 | 7 | 8 | Final |
| (Russia) Victoria Moiseeva | 1 | 0 | 1 | 1 | 0 | 4 | 0 | X | 7 |
| (Russia) Anna Venevtseva | 0 | 1 | 0 | 0 | 1 | 0 | 1 | X | 3 |

=== Draw 4 ===
Saturday, May 20, 9:00

| Sheet A | 1 | 2 | 3 | 4 | 5 | 6 | 7 | 8 | Final |
| (Finland) Oona Kauste | 0 | 0 | 0 | 1 | 1 | 0 | 2 | 2 | 6 |
| (United States) Nina Roth | 0 | 2 | 0 | 0 | 0 | 1 | 0 | 0 | 3 |

| Sheet B | 1 | 2 | 3 | 4 | 5 | 6 | 7 | 8 | Final |
| (Switzerland) Alina Pätz | 0 | 0 | 0 | 0 | 0 | 0 | X | X | 0 |
| (Russia) Anna Sidorova | 0 | 0 | 2 | 4 | 1 | 1 | X | X | 8 |

=== Draw 5 ===
Saturday, May 20, 13:00

| Sheet A | 1 | 2 | 3 | 4 | 5 | 6 | 7 | 8 | 9 | Final |
| (Canada) Jennifer Jones | 1 | 0 | 1 | 0 | 0 | 1 | 0 | 2 | 1 | 6 |
| (Russia) Victoria Moiseeva | 0 | 1 | 0 | 3 | 0 | 0 | 1 | 0 | 0 | 5 |

| Sheet B | 1 | 2 | 3 | 4 | 5 | 6 | 7 | 8 | Final |
| (Russia) Anna Venevtseva | 0 | 1 | 0 | 0 | 1 | 0 | 0 | X | 2 |
| (Sweden) Margaretha Sigfridsson | 2 | 0 | 1 | 1 | 0 | 1 | 2 | X | 7 |

=== Draw 6 ===
Saturday, May 20, 16:30

| Sheet A | 1 | 2 | 3 | 4 | 5 | 6 | 7 | 8 | Final |
| (United States) Nina Roth | 1 | 0 | 1 | 1 | 0 | 2 | 0 | 0 | 5 |
| (Switzerland) Alina Pätz | 0 | 1 | 0 | 0 | 4 | 0 | 0 | 1 | 6 |

| Sheet B | 1 | 2 | 3 | 4 | 5 | 6 | 7 | 8 | Final |
| (Russia) Anna Sidorova | 0 | 1 | 0 | 0 | 2 | 1 | 2 | X | 6 |
| (Finland) Oona Kauste | 2 | 0 | 0 | 0 | 0 | 0 | 0 | X | 2 |

== Playoffs ==
Semifinals
A1 | (Canada) Jennifer Jones | 6
B2 | (Switzerland) Alina Pätz | 1
B1 | (Russia) Anna Sidorova | 5
A2 | (Russia) Victoria Moiseeva | 2

Final
A1 | (Canada) Jennifer Jones | 3
B1 | (Russia) Anna Sidorova | 5

| Third place game |
| B2 | (Switzerland) Alina Pätz | 4 |
| A2 | (Russia) Victoria Moiseeva | 5 |

=== Semifinals ===
Sunday, May 21, 7:00

| Sheet A | 1 | 2 | 3 | 4 | 5 | 6 | 7 | 8 | Final |
| (Canada) Jennifer Jones | 0 | 2 | 0 | 0 | 3 | 0 | 1 | X | 6 |
| (Switzerland) Alina Pätz | 0 | 0 | 0 | 1 | 0 | 0 | 0 | X | 1 |

| Sheet B | 1 | 2 | 3 | 4 | 5 | 6 | 7 | 8 | Final |
| (Russia) Anna Sidorova | 2 | 0 | 0 | 1 | 1 | 1 | 0 | X | 5 |
| (Russia) Victoria Moiseeva | 0 | 0 | 1 | 0 | 0 | 0 | 1 | X | 2 |

=== Third place game ===
Sunday, May 21, 11:00

| Sheet B | 1 | 2 | 3 | 4 | 5 | 6 | 7 | 8 | 9 | Final |
| (Switzerland) Alina Pätz | 2 | 0 | 0 | 1 | 0 | 0 | 1 | 0 | 0 | 4 |
| (Russia) Victoria Moiseeva | 0 | 2 | 0 | 0 | 0 | 1 | 0 | 1 | 1 | 5 |

=== Final ===
Sunday, May 21, 11:00

| Sheet A | 1 | 2 | 3 | 4 | 5 | 6 | 7 | 8 | Final |
| (Canada) Jennifer Jones | 1 | 0 | 0 | 0 | 1 | 0 | 1 | 0 | 3 |
| (Russia) Anna Sidorova | 0 | 2 | 0 | 0 | 0 | 2 | 0 | 1 | 5 |
