= Kayak (Krasnoyarsk Krai) =

Kayak Каяк
- Vanished mining settlement
- Location within Krasnoyarsk Krai, Russia Kayak (Russia)
- Country: Russia
- Krai: Krasnoyarsk Krai
- Municipal district: Taimyrsky (Khatanga)
- Founded: 1947
- Depopulated: 2010–2014

Population (2021)
  - Total: 57
- Time zone: UTC+7 (KRAST)
- Area code: +7 39191

Kayak was a mining village in the Taimyr Dolgano-Nenets District of Krasnoyarsk Krai, Russia. It is part of the Khatanga rural settlement. Until 2007, it was part of the Khatanga District of the Taimyr Autonomous Okrug of Krasnoyarsk Krai. It has the northern most point coal mine in the Arctic Circle.

== History ==
The village was founded in the mid-20th century as the youngest settlement in the Khatanga District, Kayak played a vital strategic role in the region's economy by supplying coal to the entire district. The village featured its own educational institutions, cultural facilities, and experimental Arctic agriculture.

== Exhibition ==
On April 3, the Taimyr Museum of Local History opened a multimedia exhibition titled "Coal and Ice. Chronicles of the Village of Kayak" to commemorate the settlement's 80th anniversary. Hosted on a multimedia table on the museum's third floor, the exhibition features previously unexhibited photographs and archival documents detailing the settlement's development, transportation history, and mining operations.

== Population ==
The mining settlement, Kayak currently has a permanent resident population of zero, though historical records note it once functioned as a populated industrial hub supporting the local coal mine. In the 2010s the population started to decrease. In 2021 it had 57 residents.
