= Khatangsky District =

Khatangsky District was a former district (raion) of the former Taymyr (Dolgan-Nenets) Autonomous Okrug, Russia which was merged into Krasnoyarsk Krai on 1 January 2007. The administrative centre of the district was the town of Khatanga.

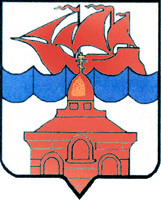
Coat of arms of Khatangsky District

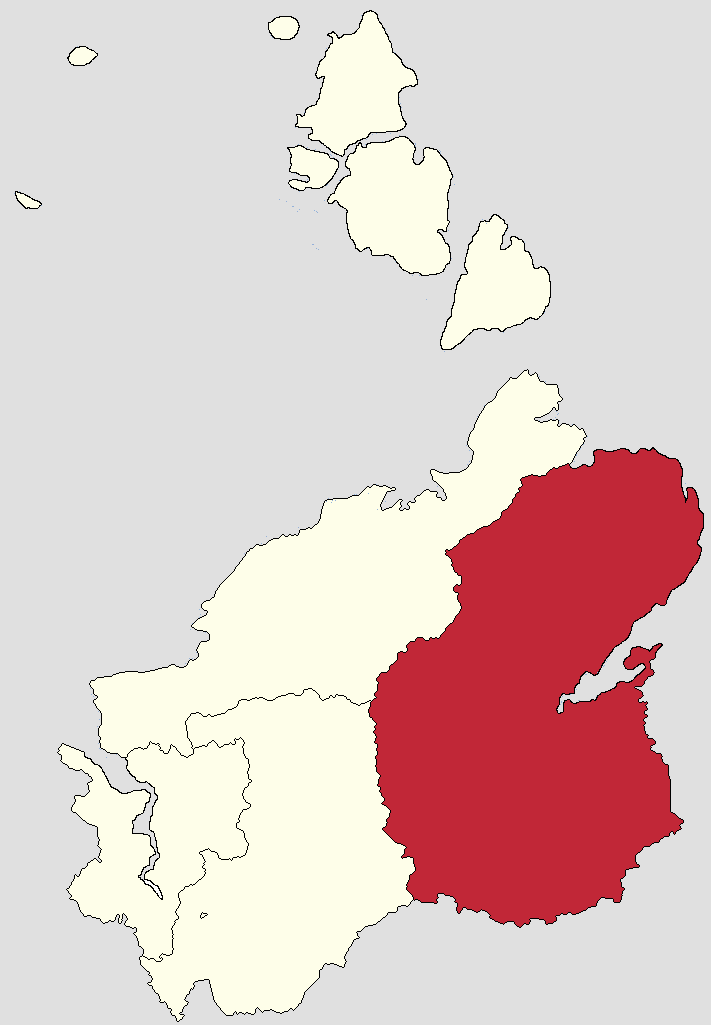
Khatangsky district on a map of Taymyria

Khatangsky district was located in the east of the Taymyr Dolgan-Nenets AO. It encompassed the south-eastern part of the Taymyr Peninsula and the majority of the Khatanga River was in the district.

== History ==
Khatangsky district was created on 10 February 1927, before Taymyr AO was created. In 1930, when the okrug was formed, Khatangsky district became immediately subordinated to it.

Upon the merger of Taymyr AO and Krasnoyarsk Krai on 1 January 2007, Khatangsky district was abolished.

== Demographics ==
=== Settlements ===
The district contained 10 settlements, 1 of which is nearly abandoned (postal codes in brackets):

- The town of Khatanga (647460) - population 2,524
- The village of Syndassko (647472) - population 570
- The village of Novorybnaya (647471) - population 526
- The village of Kheta (647484) - population 354
- The village of Popigai (647474) - population 319
- The village of Katyryk (647483) - population 317
- The village of Kresty (647475) - population 308
- The village of Novaya (647485) - population 294
- The village of Zhdanikha (647470) - population 204
- The village of Kayak (647486) - population said to be 4, but may be abandoned

=== Population ===
The population of the town and 10 settlements of the former district (since 1939) were:

- 1939: 3,115
- 1959: 5,008
- 1970: 7,471
- 1979: 8,290
- 1989: 10,251
- 2002: 6,980
- 2010: 6,081
