= Ust-Yeniseysky District =

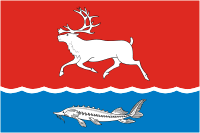
Flag of Ust-Yeniseysky District

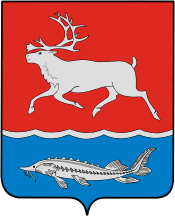
Coat of arms of Ust-Yeniseysky District

Ust-Yeniseisky district was a former district (raion) of the former Taymyr (Dolgan-Nenets) Autonomous Okrug which was merged into Krasnoyarsk Krai on 1 January 2007. The administrative centre of the district was the town of Karaul.

== Location ==
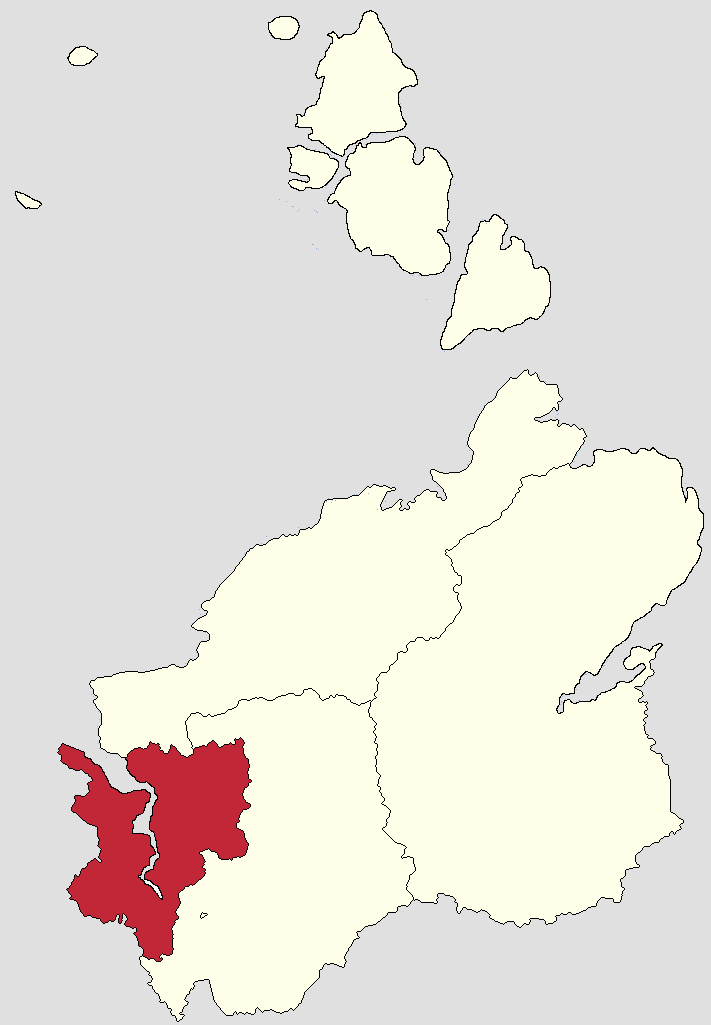
Ust-Yeniseysky district on a map of Taymyria

Ust-Yeniseisky district was located in the south-west of the Taymyr Dolgan-Nenets AO. Along with the three other districts of the former okrug after they were merged into one, it became a part of the Taymyr Dolgan-Nenets District of Krasnoyarsk Krai. As its name suggests, its territory encompassed the mouth of the Yenisei River.

== History ==
Ust-Yeniseisky district was created in 1930, when the Taymyr (Dolgan-Nenets) Autonomous Okrug was first created, known as the Taymyr National Okrug. In 1957, Diksonsky district separated from Ust-Yeniseisky district.

Upon the merger of Taymyr AO and Krasnoyarsk Krai on 1 January 2007, Ust-Yeniseisky district was abolished. It now forms the western area of Taymyrsky Dolgano-Nenetsky District of Krasnoyarsk Krai.

== Demographics ==
=== Settlements ===
Ust-Yeniseisky district had 10 settlements, 1 of which is abandoned (postal codes in brackets):

- The town of Karaul (647220)) - population 801
- The village of Nosok (663286) - population 1,692
- The village of Tukhard (647502) - population 814
- The village of Ust-Port (647232) - population 338
- The village of Vorontsovo (647235) - population 253
- The village of Baikalovsk (647234) - population 122
- The village of Polikarpovsk (647230) - population 33
- The village of Kazantsevo (647232) - population 17
- The village of Munguy (647234) - population 11
- The village of Karepovsk (647235) - abandoned between 2002 and 2010

=== Population ===
The population of the town and 9 inhabited settlements of the former district (since 1939) were:

- 1939: 4,264
- 1959: 4,427
- 1970: 4,009
- 1979: 3,679
- 1989: 3,884
- 2002: 4,166
- 2010: 3,922
