= Dudinka =

Town in Krasnoyarsk Krai, Russia

Dudinka Дудинка
- Town

Other transcription(s)
  - Nenets: Тут'ын
  - Dolgan: ?Дудинка?
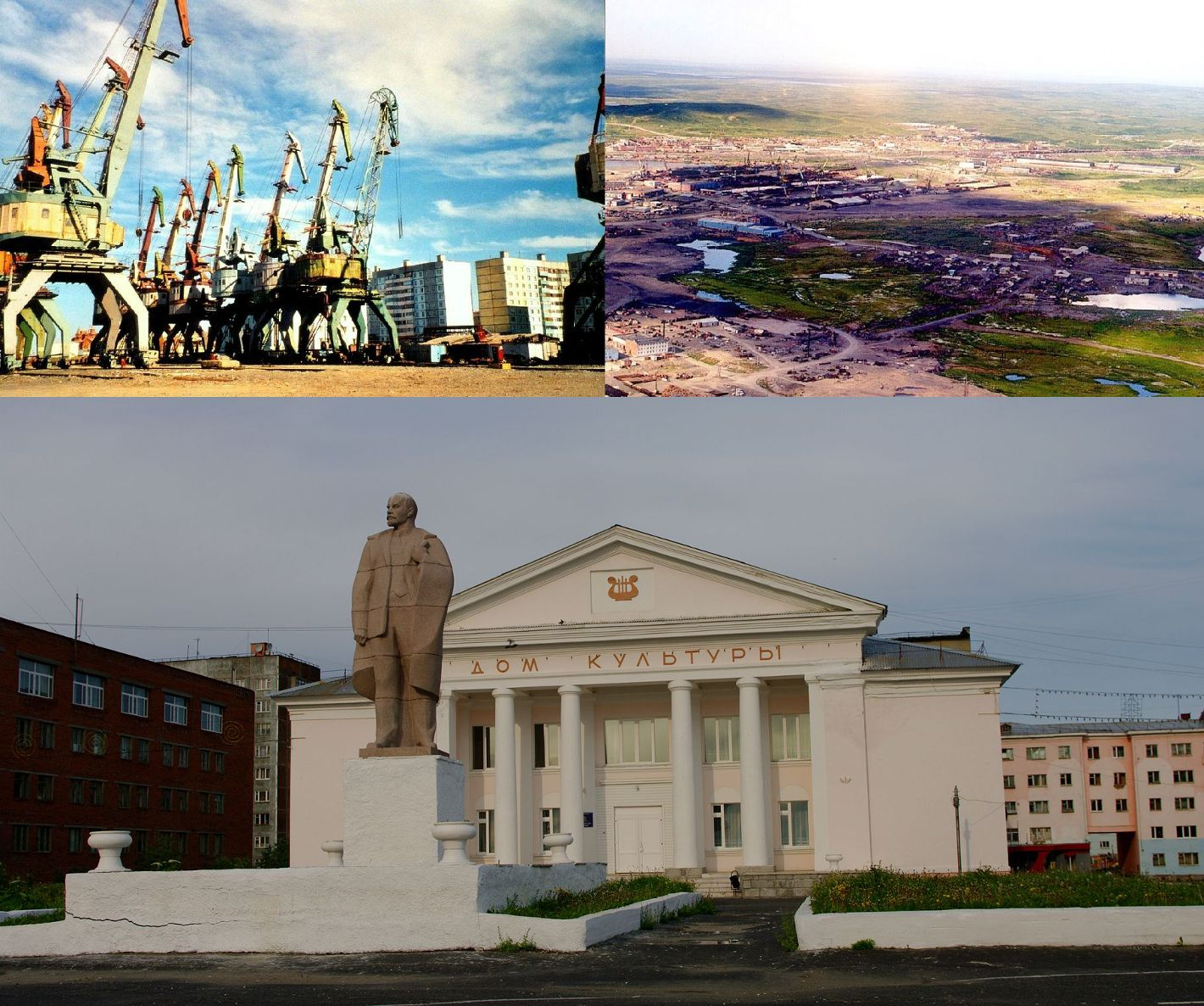
- Clockwise: Dudinka Port, Aerial view of Dudinka; House of Culture

- Flag Coat of arms
- Interactive map of Dudinka
- Location of Dudinka Dudinka (Krasnoyarsk Krai)
- Coordinates: 69°24′23″N 86°10′35″E
- Country: Russia
- Federal subject: Krasnoyarsk Krai
- Administrative district: Taymyrsky Dolgano-Nenetsky District
- District townSelsoviet: Dudinka
- Founded: 1667
- Town status since: 1951

Area
  - Total: 10.5 km^{2} (4.1 sq mi)
- Elevation: 20 m (66 ft)

Population (2010 Census)
  - Total: 22,175
  - Estimate (2024): 19,309 (−12.9%)
  - Density: 2,110/km^{2} (5,470/sq mi)

Administrative status
  - Capital of: Taymyrsky Dolgano-Nenetsky District, district town of Dudinka

Municipal status
  - Municipal district: Taymyrsky Dolgano-Nenetsky Municipal District
  - Urban settlement: Dudinka Urban Settlement
  - Capital of: Taymyrsky Dolgano-Nenetsky Municipal District, Dudinka Urban Settlement
- Time zone: UTC+7 (MSK+4)
- Postal code: 647000
- Dialing code: +7 39191
- OKTMO ID: 04653101001
- Website: www.gorod-dudinka.ru

Dudinka (Russian: Дуди́нка; Nenets: Тут'ын, Tutꜧyn) is a town on the Yenisei River and the administrative center of Taymyrsky Dolgano-Nenetsky District of Krasnoyarsk Krai, Russia. It used to be the administrative center of Taymyr Autonomous Okrug, which was merged into Krasnoyarsk Krai on January 1, 2007. Population: 19,556 (2021 census); 22,175 (2010 census); 25,132 (2002 census); 32,325 (1989 Soviet census).

== History ==
It was founded in 1667 as a winter settlement connected to Mangazeya. In 1930 it was designated the administrative center of the Taimyr Dolgan-Nenets National Region. In 1935, the polar explorer Otto Schmidt recommended that the settlement be expanded into a town. By 1937, the port facilities and a railroad to Norilsk were completed. Town status was granted in 1951.

In the 1940s and 1950s deported Finns and Soviet Germans were buried in the Lighthouse cemetery. In the 1990s two crosses were erected there in their memory.

== Administrative and municipal status ==
Within the framework of administrative divisions, Dudinka serves as the administrative center of Taymyrsky Dolgano-Nenetsky District. As an administrative division, it is, together with five rural localities, incorporated within Taymyrsky Dolgano-Nenetsky District as the district town of Dudinka. As a municipal division, the district town of Dudinka is incorporated within Taymyrsky Dolgano-Nenetsky Municipal District as Dudinka Urban Settlement.

== Economy ==
Dudinka processes and sends cargo via Norilsk railway to the Norilsk Mining and Smelting Factory and also ships non-ferrous metals, coal and ore. In 1969, the Messoyakha-Dudinka-Norilsk natural gas pipeline was laid.

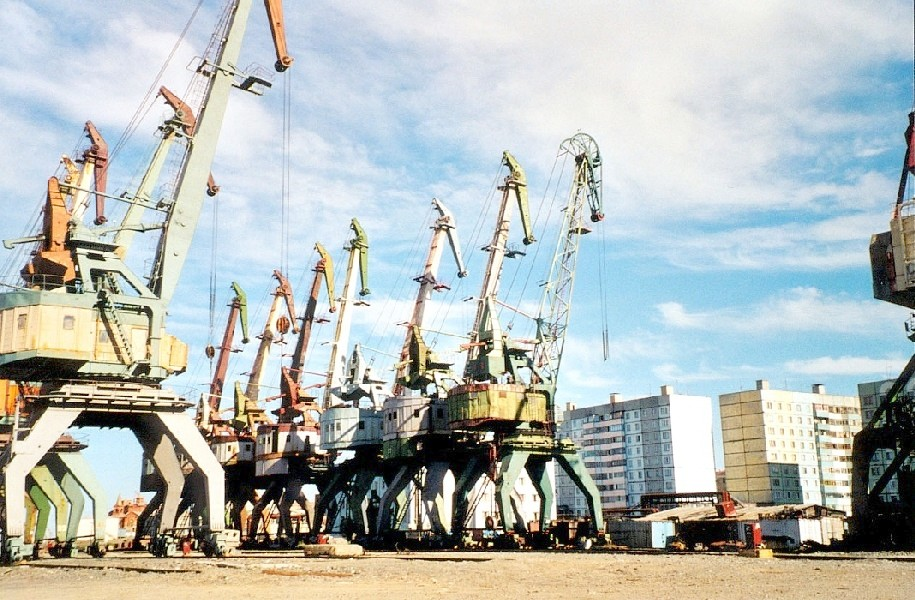
Port of Dudinka

Dudinka is home to a unique Arctic port, in the lower reaches of the Yenisey, which is accessible to both sea and river ships. During the navigation season, from mid-June to October, the port can receive both seafaring ships and river vessels from Krasnoyarsk (about 2,000 km along the Yenisey). At this time, fresh food and essential goods are brought to Dudinka and then to Norilsk from the "mainland". As soon as the navigation is possible, fruit and vegetable stalls spring up in the streets and food prices in grocery stores drop drastically. And, when the Yenisey is icebound, Dudinka receives and dispatches ice-class vessels taking the Northern Sea Route. They take away the products of the Norilsk Mining and Metallurgical Combine and bring the fuel and raw materials that industrial plants rely on for their operation. The port operates every day apart from a couple of weeks a year, when it is flooded during the spring high water. It is the only port in the world that experiences such a nuisance. When, at the end of May, the ice starts breaking up on the Yenisey, the cranes are moved from the port to special holding areas, where they remain for the duration of the high water. All large cargoes are delivered exclusively by water.

The town is served by the Dudinka Airport.

=== Infrastructure ===
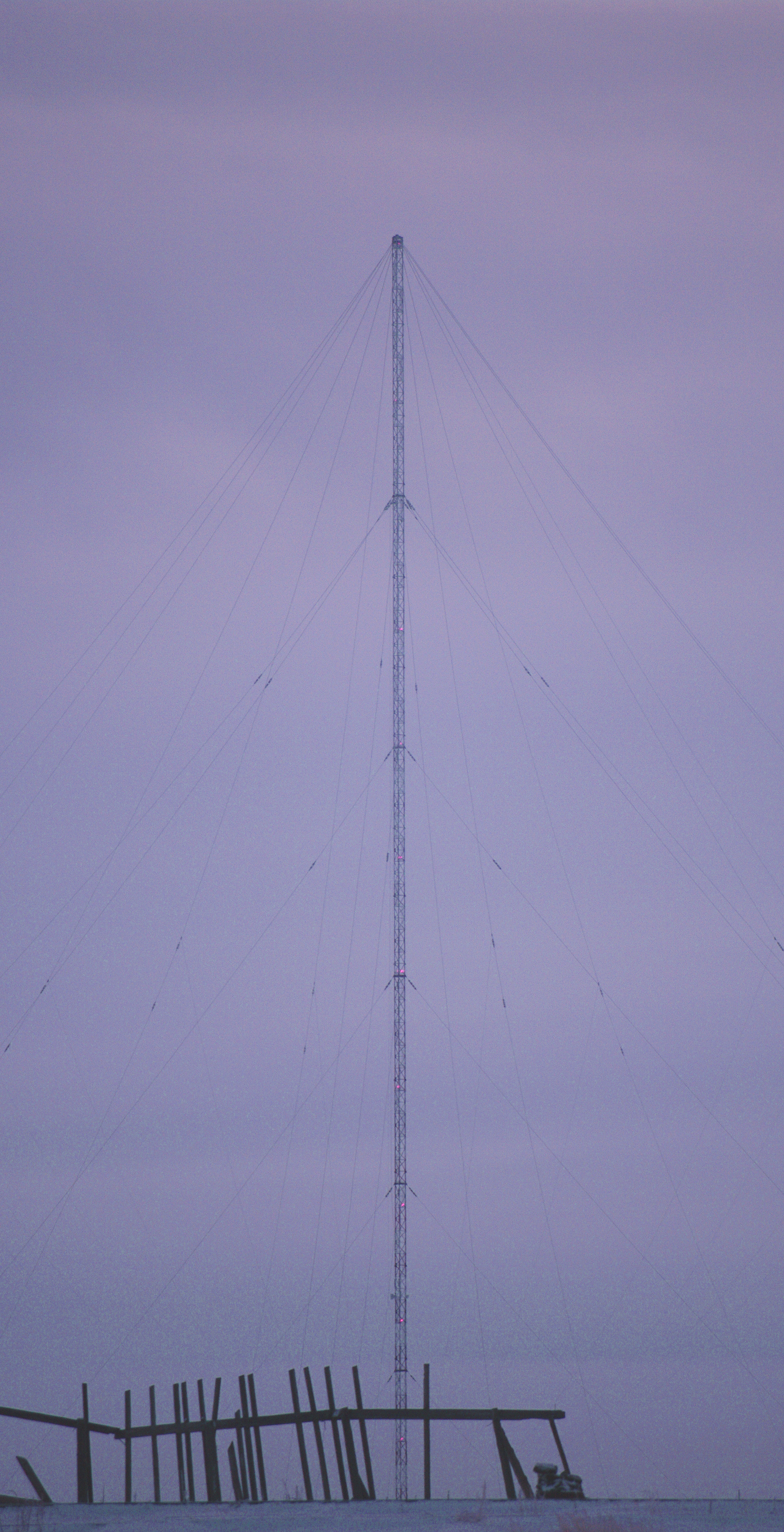
CHAYKA mast in Dudinka

Near Dudinka there is a 462 m (1,516 ft) tall radio mast which was formerly used for the CHAYKA radio navigation system. It is a grounded mast with a rhombic cage antenna.

== Geography ==
=== Climate ===
Despite lying more than two degrees above the Arctic Circle, Dudinka has a subarctic climate (Köppen climate classification Dfc) with short, mild summers and severely cold winters. Average high temperature even in May is below freezing and short summer starts in mid June and lasts only 2 months, despite the midnight sun. Precipitation is moderate; it falls mostly as rain in summer and mainly as snow throughout the rest of the year.

Climate data for Dudinka
Month	Jan	Feb	Mar	Apr	May	Jun	Jul	Aug	Sep	Oct	Nov	Dec	Year
Record high °C (°F)	−0.3 (31.5)	−0.6 (30.9)	4.2 (39.6)	8.8 (47.8)	26.5 (79.7)	31.2 (88.2)	32.3 (90.1)	30.0 (86.0)	24.5 (76.1)	12.3 (54.1)	2.7 (36.9)	0.7 (33.3)	32.3 (90.1)
Mean daily maximum °C (°F)	−22.7 (−8.9)	−22.3 (−8.1)	−15.8 (3.6)	−9.3 (15.3)	−1.1 (30.0)	11.1 (52.0)	19.1 (66.4)	15.8 (60.4)	7.4 (45.3)	−4.8 (23.4)	−16.3 (2.7)	−21.1 (−6.0)	−5 (23)
Daily mean °C (°F)	−26.9 (−16.4)	−26.6 (−15.9)	−21.2 (−6.2)	−15.1 (4.8)	−5 (23)	6.7 (44.1)	13.8 (56.8)	11.2 (52.2)	4.0 (39.2)	−7.9 (17.8)	−20.5 (−4.9)	−25.1 (−13.2)	−9.4 (15.1)
Mean daily minimum °C (°F)	−31 (−24)	−30.8 (−23.4)	−26 (−15)	−20.2 (−4.4)	−8.5 (16.7)	3.3 (37.9)	9.5 (49.1)	7.6 (45.7)	1.4 (34.5)	−10.9 (12.4)	−24.7 (−12.5)	−29.3 (−20.7)	−13.3 (8.1)
Record low °C (°F)	−56.7 (−70.1)	−55 (−67)	−52.1 (−61.8)	−45.4 (−49.7)	−32.6 (−26.7)	−14.2 (6.4)	−0.8 (30.6)	−2.5 (27.5)	−20.2 (−4.4)	−38.8 (−37.8)	−48.7 (−55.7)	−53.5 (−64.3)	−56.7 (−70.1)
Average precipitation mm (inches)	44 (1.7)	38 (1.5)	34 (1.3)	30 (1.2)	30 (1.2)	37 (1.5)	44 (1.7)	59 (2.3)	50 (2.0)	59 (2.3)	46 (1.8)	48 (1.9)	519 (20.4)
Average rainy days	0.03	0	0.1	1	6	13	15	17	16	5	0.3	0.1	74
Average snowy days	24	22	21	18	18	6	0.2	0.4	9	24	23	24	190
Average relative humidity (%)	75	75	75	75	79	74	69	78	82	84	79	76	77
Mean monthly sunshine hours	2	32	131	227	245	229	308	196	86	48	7	0	1,511
Source 1: Pogoda.ru.net
Source 2: NOAA (sun only, 1961–1990)

Historical population
Year	Pop.	±%
1939	3,568	—
1959	16,332	+357.7%
1970	19,701	+20.6%
1979	24,758	+25.7%
1989	32,325	+30.6%
2002	25,132	−22.3%
2010	22,175	−11.8%
2021	19,556	−11.8%
Source: Censuses

== Sports and entertainment ==
The Taymyr ice arena is the newly built ice hockey, figure skating and curling facility in Dudinka. It is the northernmost ice arena in the world that is fit for holding high-level, international events. The spectators capacity of the arena is 350 seats. The 2017 CCT Arctic Cup took place in the city of Dudinka at the Taymyr ice arena on May 18–22, 2017. It was the first-ever international curling tournament among women teams beyond the Arctic Circle. The event was held with participation of eight strongest teams from the northern countries, located at the 69th parallel. Participant teams included Russian National Team, Team Krasnoyarsk, Team Canada, Team USA, Team Finland. A wild card from the Organizing Committee was granted to Team Switzerland. Since 2017 Dudinka becomes the place where the international Arctic Curling Cup tournament takes place annually. The test event for this tournament was TAYMYR CURLING CUP 2016. The first-ever curling tournament among men teams beyond the Arctic Circle took place in Dudinka on May 26–30, 2016. The tournament was held as a test event for the Arctic Curling Cup. Six strongest Russian men teams took part in the event. In 2018 Dudinka held the final tour of the international Arctic Curling Cup. 10 strongest teams, three of which were Russian, were competing in double-mixed. Maria Komarova and Daniel Goryachov received bronze medals in this tournament.

== Notable people ==
- Olga Martynova, poet

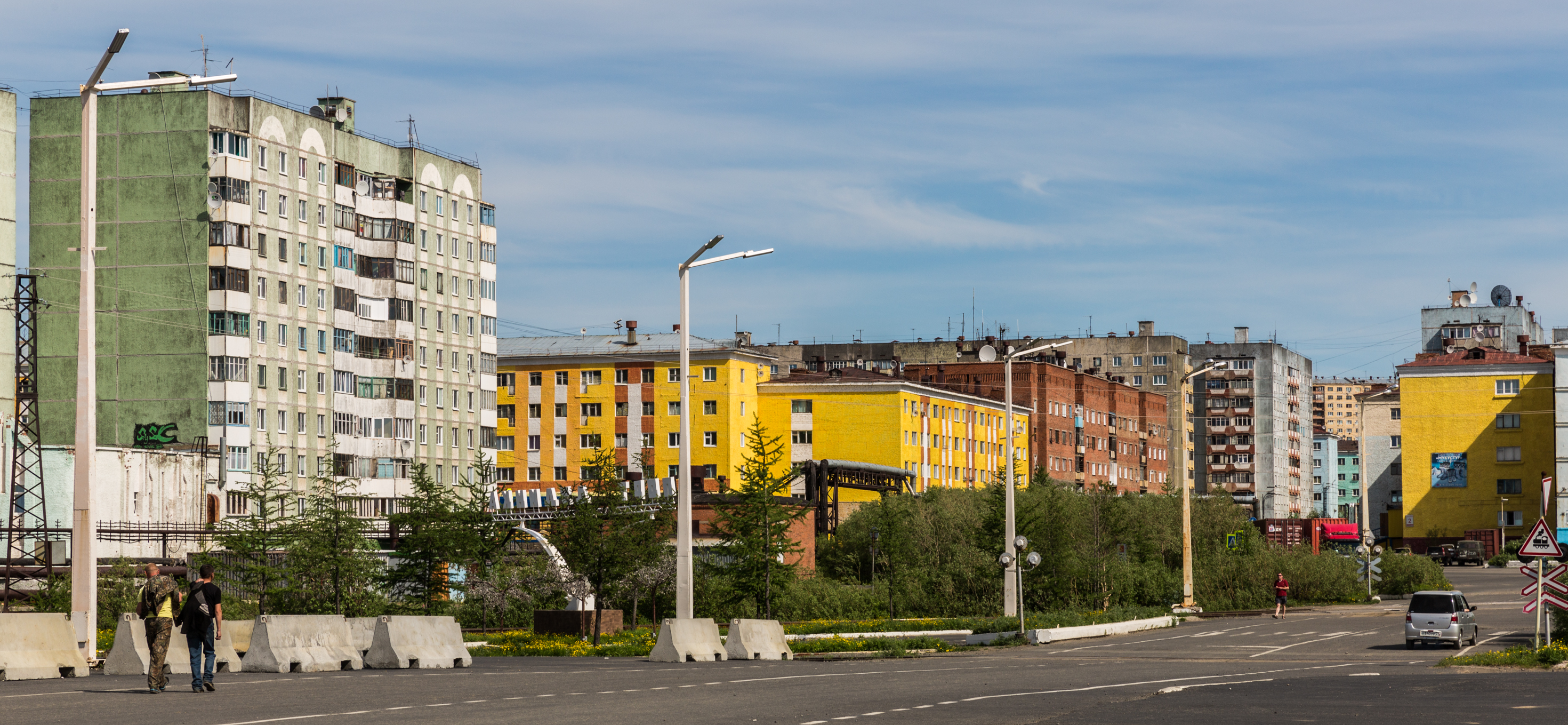
Street view of Dudinka

- Petr Yan, mixed martial artist, former and as of December 2025 current UFC Bantamweight Champion

== Gallery ==
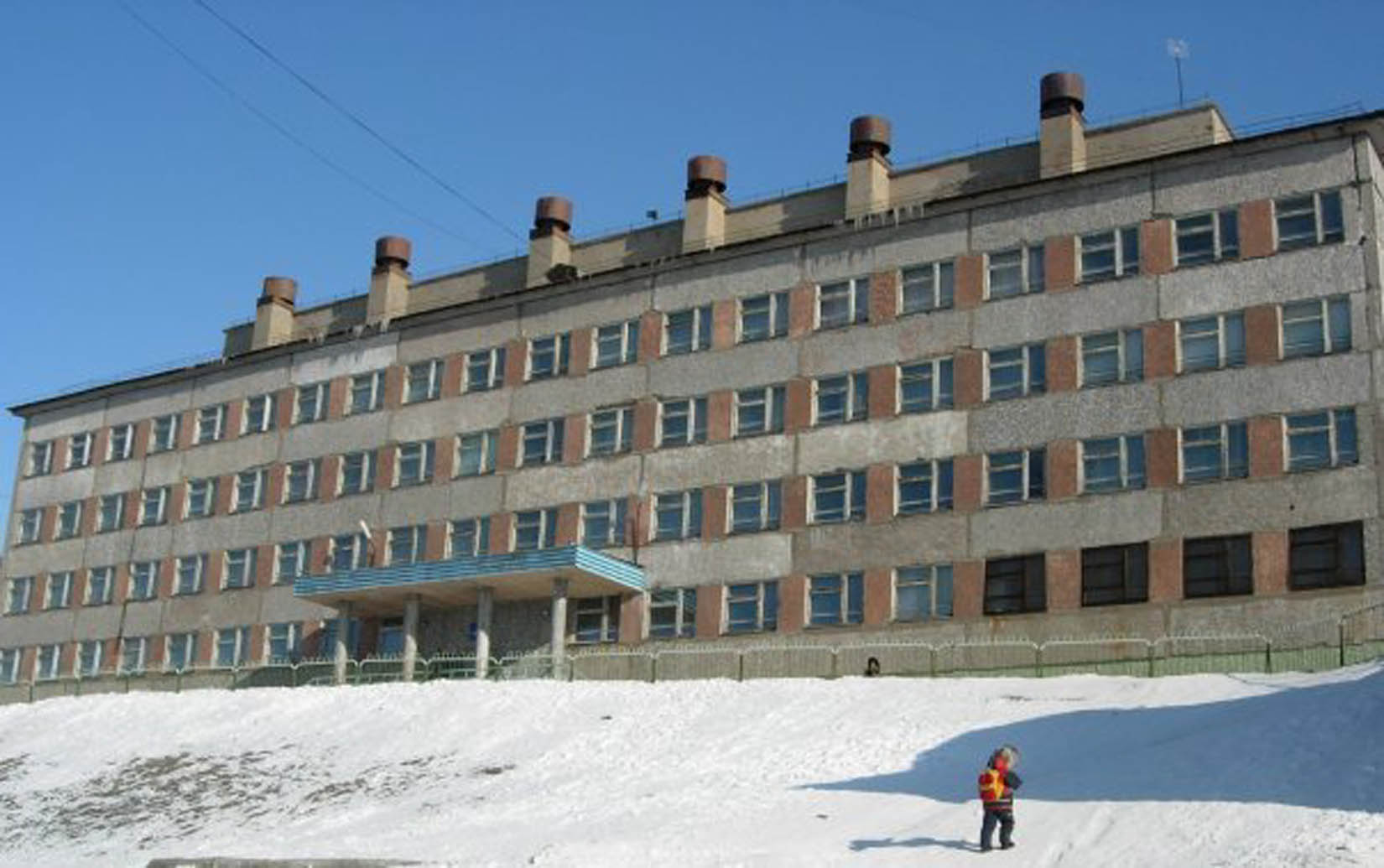
School No. 5

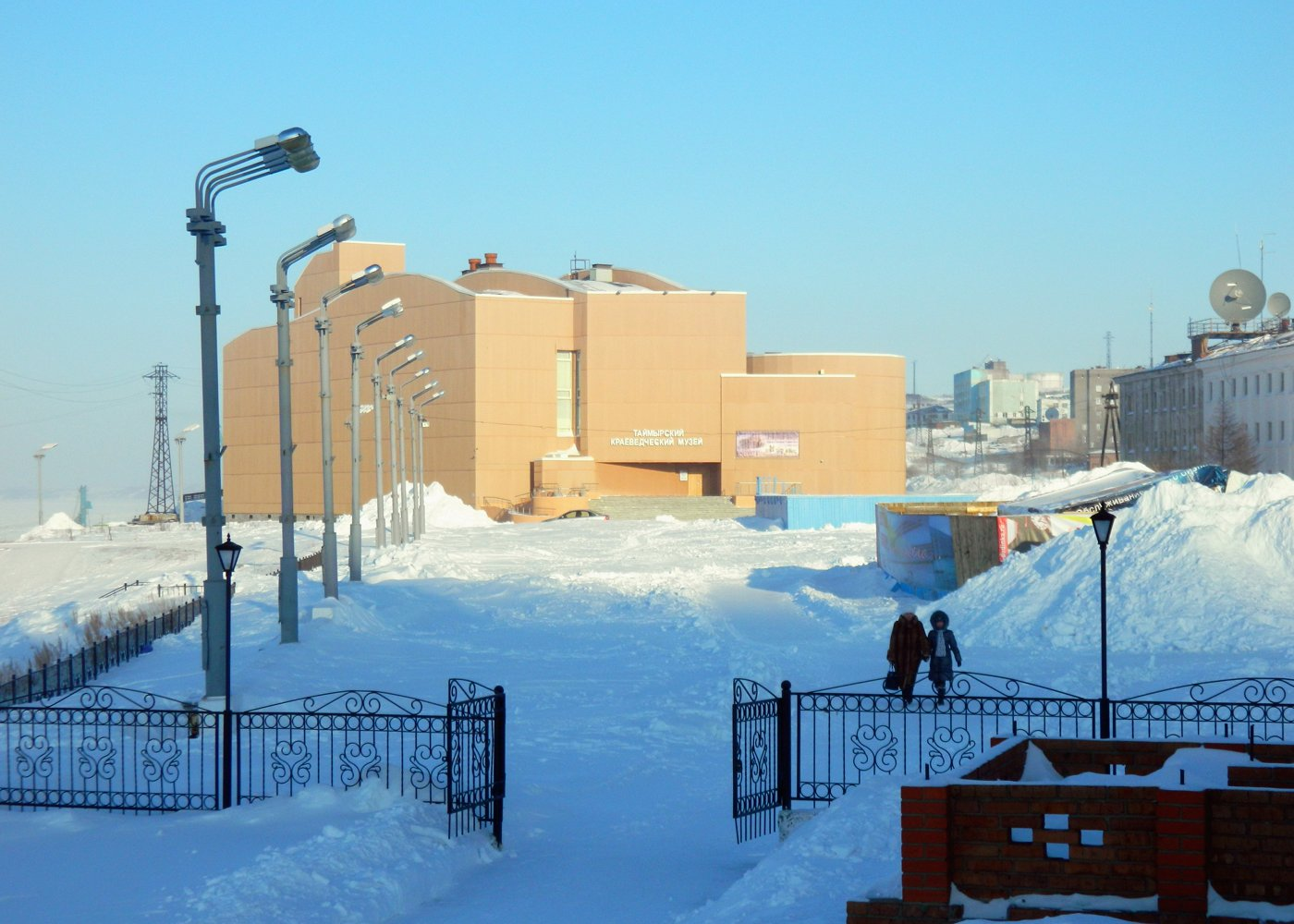
Taimyr Museum of Local History

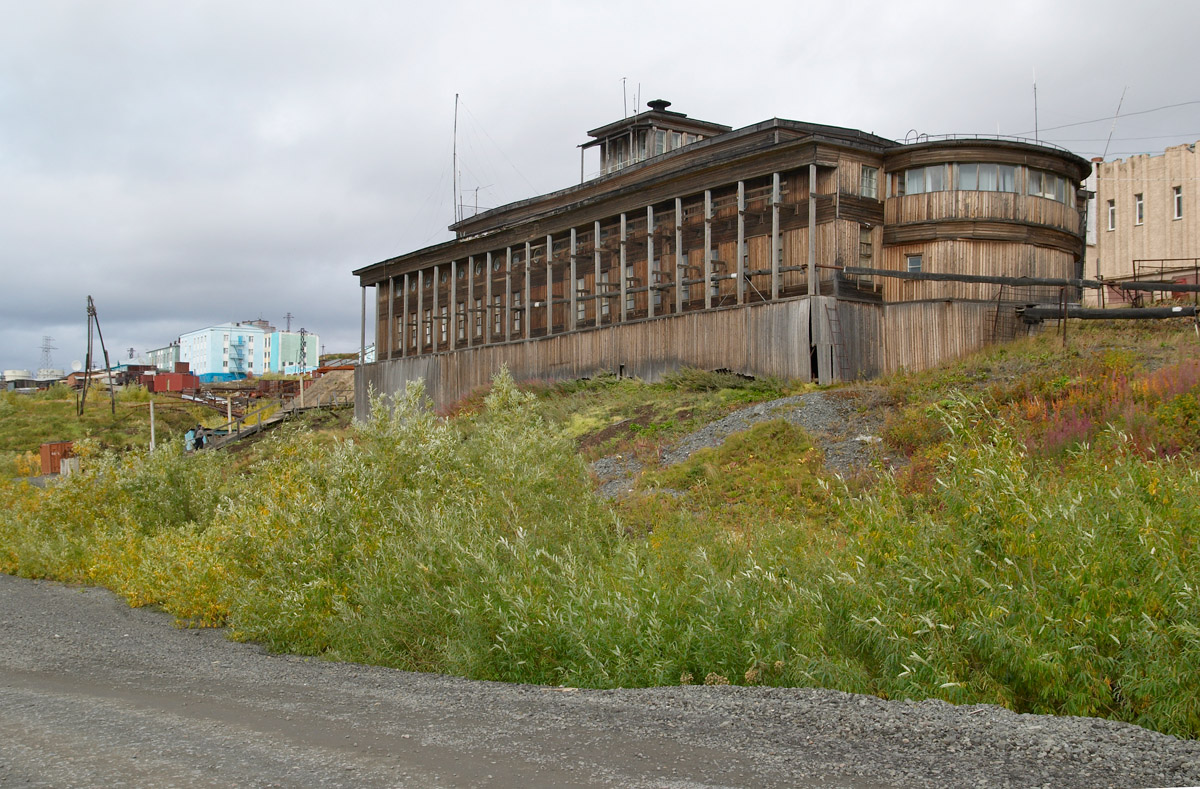
Dudinka station

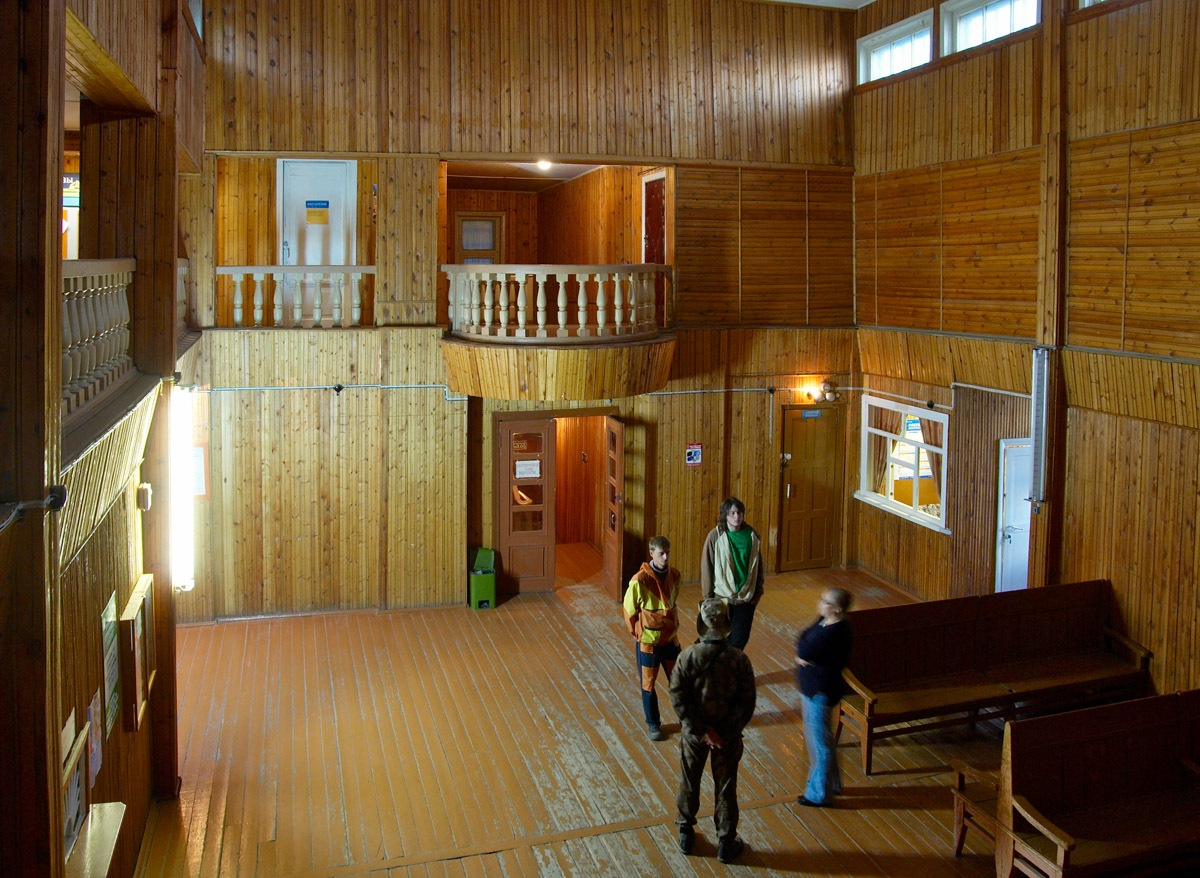
Dudinka station interior

Dudinka in winter

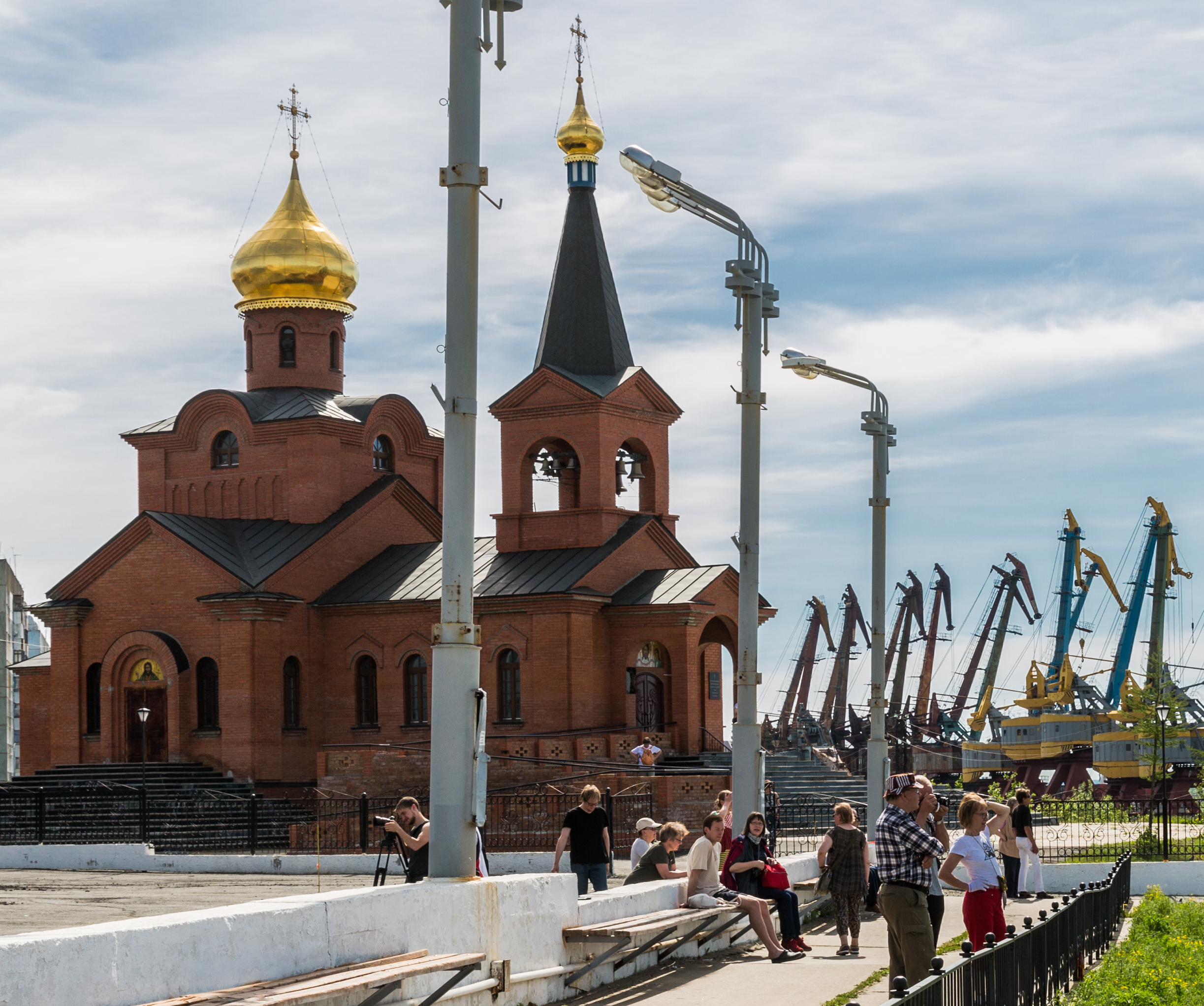
Church

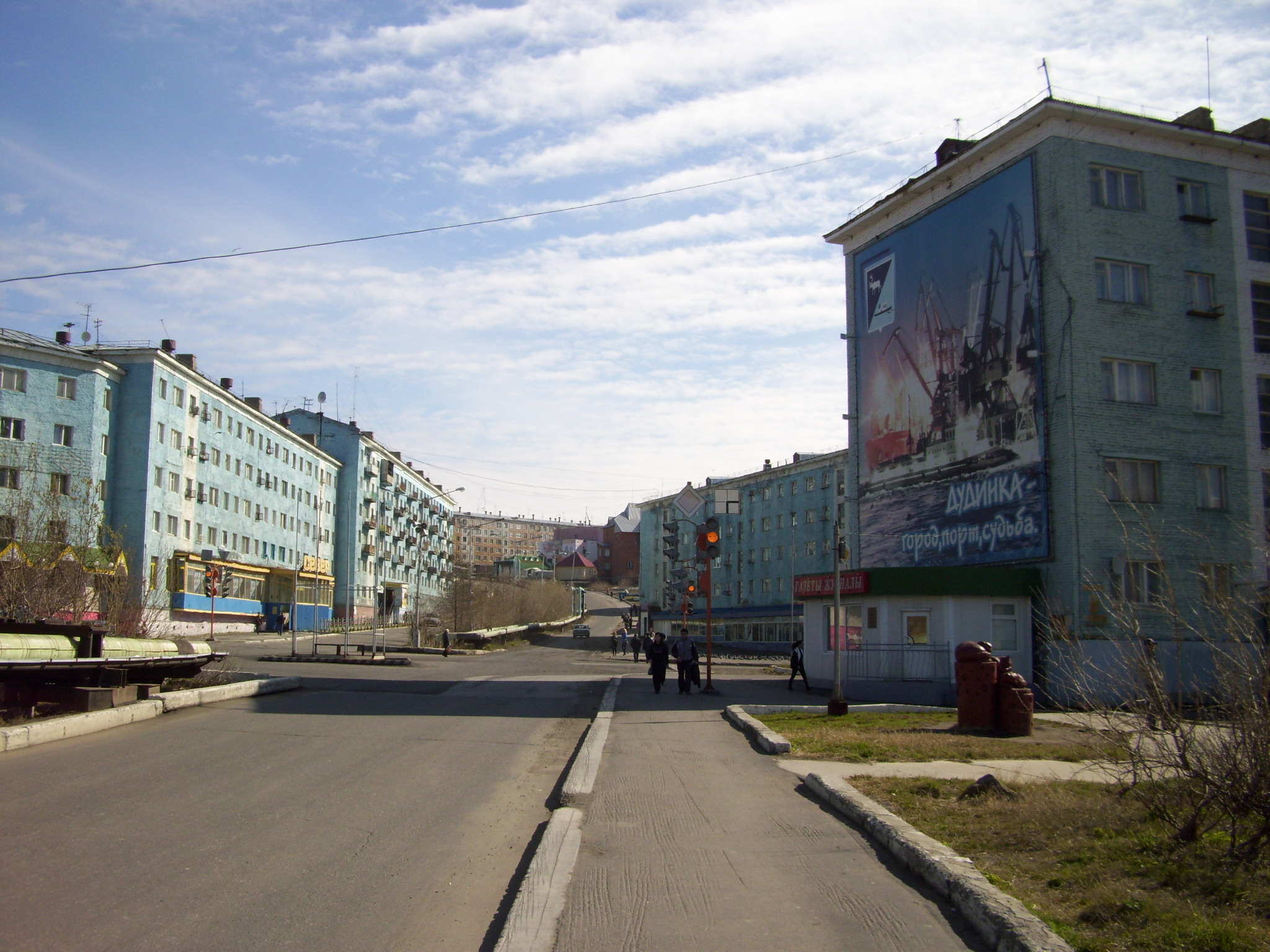
Streets of Dudinka

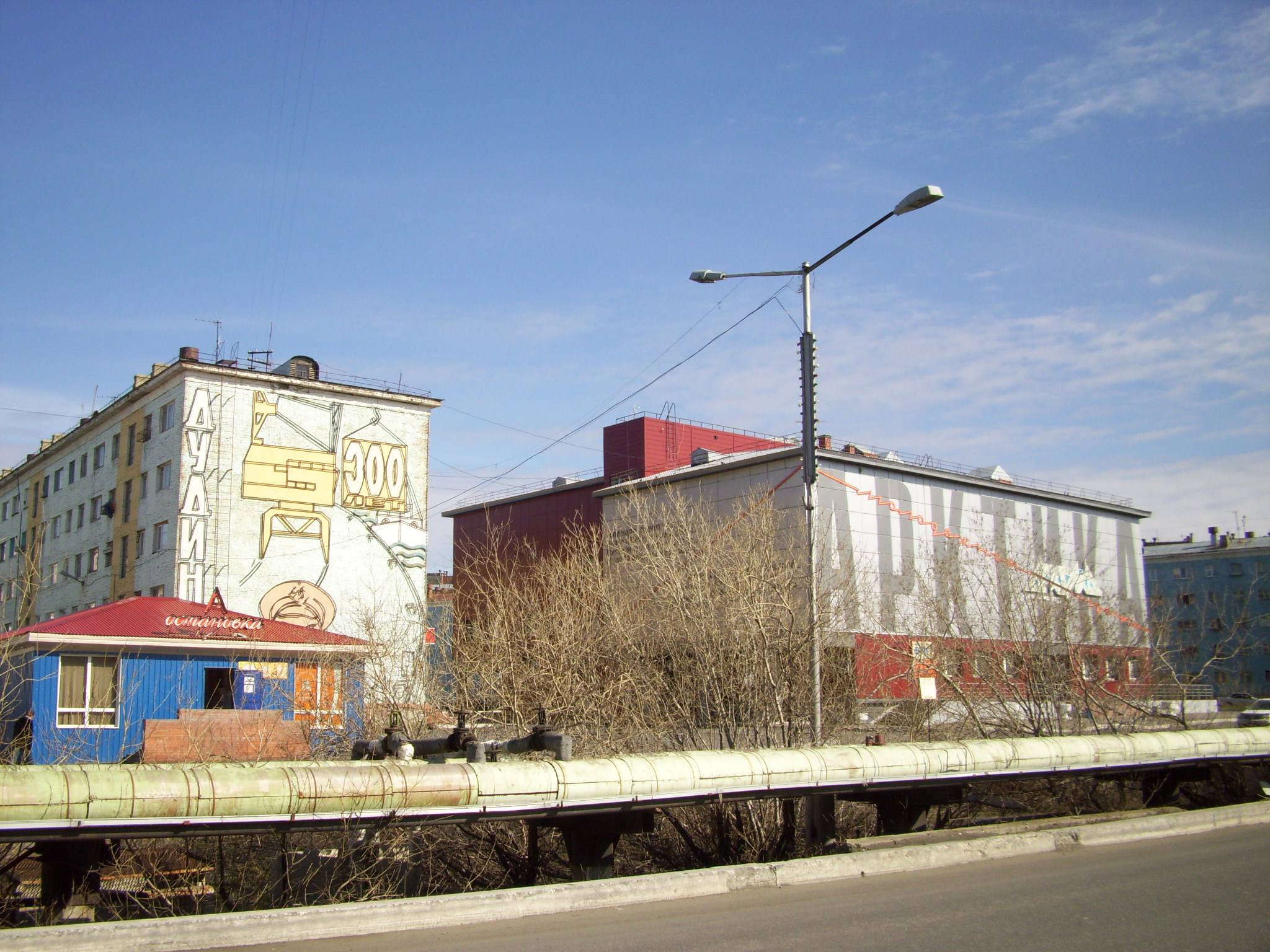
Soviet wall murals

== See also ==
- Chief Directorate of the Northern Sea Route
- Yenisei Gulf
