= Taymyr Autonomous Okrug =

Former federal subject of Russia

Coordinates: 69°24′N 86°11′E

Taymyr Dolgano-Nenets Autonomous Okrug Таймырский автономный округ (Russian)
- Autonomous Okrug
- Flag Coat of arms

- Country: Russia
- Federal district: Siberian
- Economic region: East Siberian
- Established: 10 December 1930
- Capital: Dudinka

Government
  - Body: Duma
  - Last Governor: Oleg Budargin

Area
  - Total: 879,929 km^{2} (339,742 sq mi)
  - Rank: 7th

Population
  - Estimate (2007): 38,372
- Time zone: UTC+7 (MSK+4)
- Official languages: Russian

Taymyr Dolgano-Nenets Autonomous Okrug (Russian: Таймы́рский Долга́но-Не́нецкий автоно́мный о́круг, Taymyrsky Dolgano-Nenetsky avtonomny okrug; Enets: Таймыр Оша-Дюрак район, Nenets: Таймыр Долганы-Ненэцие район) was a federal subject of Russia (an autonomous okrug of Krasnoyarsk Krai), the northernmost in Siberian Russia (and thus North Asia). It was named after the Taymyr Peninsula. It was also called Dolgan-Nenets Autonomous Okrug (Долгано-Ненецкий автономный округ), by the name of the indigenous people Dolgans and Nenets.

Flag of Taymyria

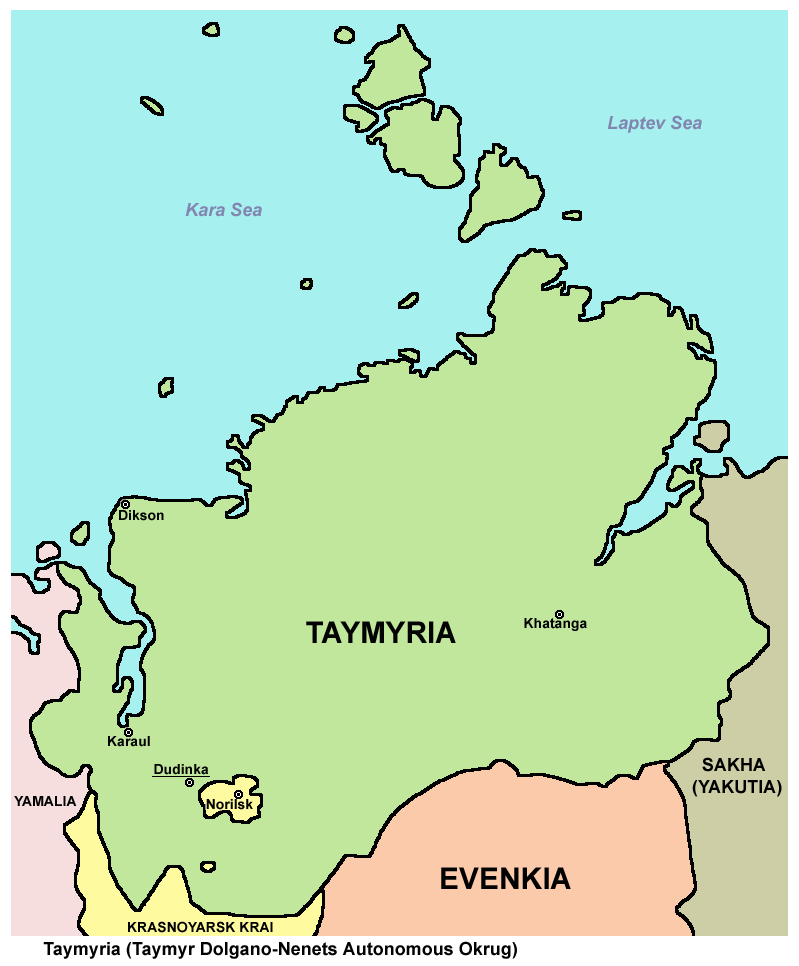
Map of Taymyr

With an area of 862,100 km^{2} (ranked 4th) and a population of 39,786 (2002 Census), the autonomous okrug was one of the least densely populated areas of Russia as of 2006. Dudinka, with more than half of Taymyr's inhabitants, was the administrative center.

Following a referendum on the issue held on April 17, 2005, Taymyr Dolgano-Nenets and Evenk Autonomous Okrugs were merged into Krasnoyarsk Krai effective January 1, 2007. Taymyr was given a special status within Krasnoyarsk Krai and incorporated as Taymyrsky Dolgano-Nenetsky District.

== Administrative divisions ==
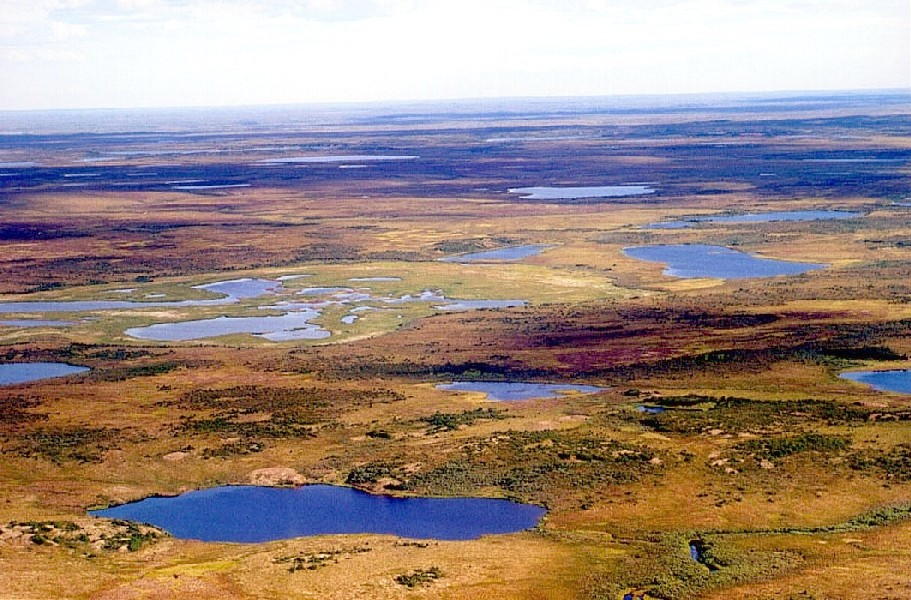
Landscape of Taymyr

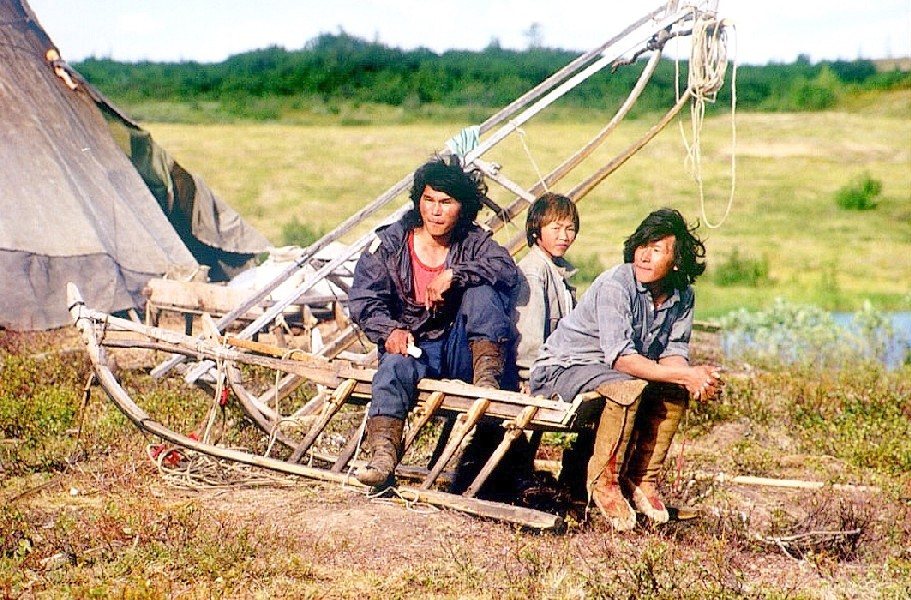
Indigenous people of Taymyr

The city of Norilsk, even though it is geographically located within Taymyr Autonomous Okrug, was administratively subordinated directly to Krasnoyarsk Krai prior to the merger. This also applied to the urban-type settlement of Snezhnogorsk, which was administratively subordinated to Norilsk. Therefore, the okrug's population reported by the Census authorities does not include the populations of Norilsk and Snezhnogorsk.

== In popular culture ==
Although not actually having been filmed in Taymyr, it is depicted in the 1985 film White Nights, starring Mikhail Baryshnikov and Gregory Hines. During the opening moments of the film, Baryshnikov's character Nikolai Rodchenko – a Soviet defector – is on a passenger plane that crash lands at "Norilsk Air Base". He later is taken into the home of Hines' character – a US defector – and his wife (played by Isabella Rossellini), where they advise him that he is in Taymyr upon regaining consciousness.

Taymyr is featured in the 2020 simulation video game SnowRunner as the third playable region of the game.

== Demographics ==
=== Population ===
(2002): 39,786.

=== Vital statistics ===
Source: Russian Federal State Statistics Service

	Average population (x 1000)	Live births	Deaths	Natural change	Crude birth rate (per 1000)	Crude death rate (per 1000)	Natural change (per 1000)
1970	38	761	299	462	20.0	7.9	12.2
1975	42	857	317	540	20.4	7.5	12.9
1980	46	996	333	663	21.7	7.2	14.4
1985	51	1 104	370	734	21.6	7.3	14.4
1990	51	842	360	482	16.4	7.0	9.4
1991	50	789	335	454	15.8	6.7	9.1
1992	48	692	401	291	14.4	8.3	6.0
1993	46	617	448	169	13.4	9.7	3.7
1994	44	585	518	67	13.3	11.8	1.5
1995	43	537	501	36	12.6	11.8	0.8
1996	42	486	441	45	11.7	10.6	1.1
1997	41	483	374	109	11.9	9.2	2.7
1998	40	498	368	130	12.6	9.3	3.3
1999	39	448	376	72	11.6	9.7	1.9
2000	38	460	438	22	12.0	11.4	0.6
2001	39	562	438	124	14.5	11.3	3.2
2002	39	608	397	211	15.5	10.1	5.4
2003	39	625	386	239	15.9	9.8	6.1
2004	39	637	345	292	16.5	8.9	7.6
2005	38	548	369	179	14.5	9.7	4.7
2006	37	540	347	193	14.5	9.3	5.2

=== Ethnic groups ===
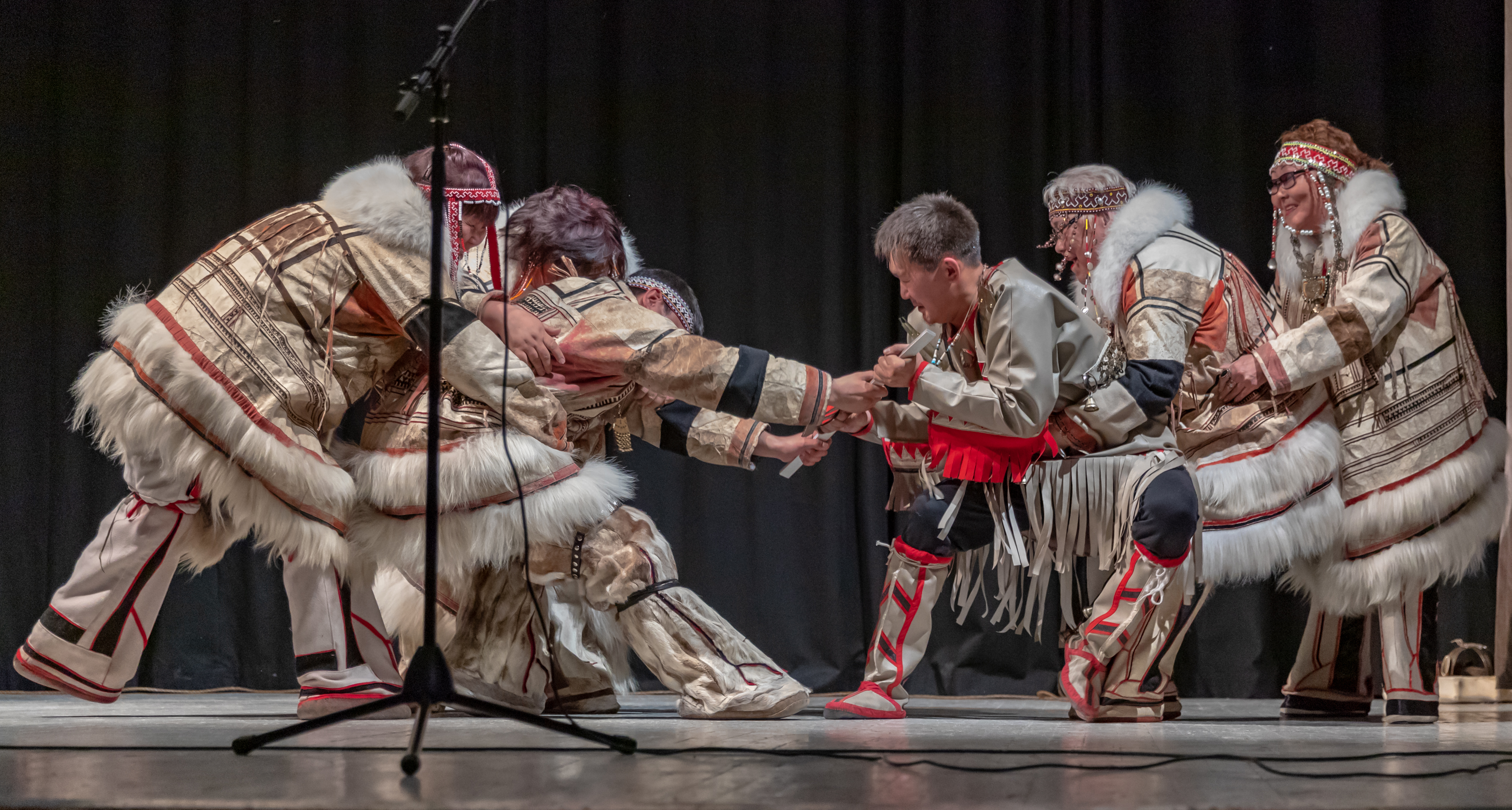
Nganasans form one of the indigenous peoples of the Taymyr.

Of the 39,786 residents (as of the 2002 census) 1,018 (2.6%) chose not to specify their ethnic background. A quarter of the population identified themselves as indigenous Siberians (Dolgans, Nenets, Nganasans, Evenks, or Enets). 58.6% of the population were ethnic Russians. Other nationalities included 2,423 Ukrainians (6.1%), 587 Volga Germans (1.5%), 425 Volga Tatars (1.1%), 294 Belarusians (0.7%) and 239 Azeris (0.6%)

Ethnic group	1939 Census		1959 Census		1970 Census		1979 Census		1989 Census		2002 Census		2010 Census	
Ethnic group	Number	%	Number	%	Number	%	Number	%	Number	%	Number	%	Number	%
Dolgans^{1}	3,971	13.8%	3,934	11.8%	4,344	11.4%	4,338	9.7%	4,939	8.9%	5,517	13.9%	5,393	15.7%
Nenets	2,523	8.8%	1,878	5.6%	2,247	5.9%	2,345	5.2%	2,446	4.4%	3,054	7.7%	3,494	10.2%
Enets^{2}	2,523	8.8%	1,878	5.6%	2,247	5.9%	2,345	5.2%	103	0.2%	197	0.5%	204	0.6%
Nganasans^{3}	2,523	8.8%	682	2.0%	765	2.0%	746	1.7%	849	1.5%	766	1.9%	747	2.2%
Evenks	563	2.0%	412	1.2%	413	1.1%	338	0.8%	311	0.6%	305	0.8%	266	0.8%
Russians	16,931	59.0%	21,799	65.3%	25,465	66.9%	30,640	68.2%	37,438	67.1%	23,348	58.6%	17,232	50.0%
Others	4,723	16.5%	4,677	14.0%	4,826	12.7%	6,546	14.6%	9,717	17.4%	6,629	16.7%	7,096	20.6%
Notes: 1. In the 1939 and 1959 census Dolgans were counted as Yakuts.; 2. In the 1939, 1959, 1970 and 1979 census Enets were counted as Nenets.; 3. In the 1939 census Nganasans were counted as Nenets.
