= List of northernmost settlements =

Arctic locations listed by type and latitude

The most northern settlements on Earth are communities close to the North Pole, ranging from about 70° N to about 89° N. The North Pole itself is at 90° N.

There are no permanent civilian settlements north of 79° N, the furthest north (78.55° N) being Ny-Ålesund, a permanent settlement of about 30 (in the winter) to 130 (in the summer) people on the Norwegian archipelago of Svalbard. Just below this settlement at 78.12° N is Svalbard's primary city, Longyearbyen, which has a population of over 2,000.

When occupied for a few weeks some years, the northernmost temporary settlement in the world is Camp Barneo, a Russian tourist attraction located near 88°11'00" N. As of 2022, it had not been occupied since 2018.

The tables below show the settlements, towns, and cities that are the northernmost in the world of their kind.

== All locations ==
Location	Country	Latitude	Population	Public	Active?	Description
Camp Barneo, Arctic Ocean Ice Sheet	None (International waters)	88°11' N	0	no	no	Latitude as of April 2009 (varies); northernmost temporarily inhabited place. A Russian-founded ice camp. It has not been occupied since 2019.
Frigg Fjord Settlements, Peary Land	Greenland (Danish Realm)	83°07' N	0	yes	no	A group of archeological sites including at least one likely inhabited both summer and winter
Ward Hunt Island Camp, Nunavut	Canada	83°06' N	0	no	no	Former exploration base in 1957–58, airstrip, building. Uninhabited as of 2019
Alert, Ellesmere Island, Nunavut	Canada	82°28' N	65 (winter minimum) to 110 (summer maximum)	no	yes	Northernmost place with a continuous (year-round) population, but no permanent residents; military and research station (CFS Alert)
Wandel Dal Settlements, Peary Land	Greenland (Danish Realm)	82°15' N	0	yes	no	A group of more than 20 archeological sites, among them several former permanent settlements
Brønlundhus, Peary Land	Greenland (Danish Realm)	82°11' N	0	no	no	Former exploration base, 1947 to 1950
Kap Harald Moltke, Peary Land	Greenland (Danish Realm)	82°10' N	0	no	no	Former exploration base
Deltaterrasserne, Peary Land	Greenland (Danish Realm)	82°07' N	0	yes	no	Archaeological site
Fort Conger, Ellesmere Island, Nunavut	Canada	81°44' N	0	no	no	Former exploration camp, 1881 to 1883 and 1957 to 1958
Nord	Greenland (Danish Realm)	81°43' N	5	no	yes	Military and scientific base
Nagurskoye, Franz Josef Land	Russia	80°48' N	52	no	yes	Border guard facility and meteorological station
Krenkel, Franz Josef Land	Russia	80°37' N	7	no	yes	Meteorological station
Tikhaya Bay, Franz Josef Land	Russia	80°20' N	0	no	no	Former weather station
Nunatami, Washington Land, NW	Greenland (Danish Realm)	80°02' N	0	yes	no	Hunting station and former permanent settlement, 1917 to 1920
Eureka, Ellesmere Island, Nunavut	Canada	79°59' N	8	no	yes	Scientific station
Ytre Norskøya, Svalbard	Norway	79°51'20" N	0	no	no	Former Dutch whaling station, 1620s to 1670
Smeerenburg, Amsterdam Island, Svalbard	Norway	79°43'54" N	0	no	no	Former Danish–Dutch whaling station, 1619 to 1657
Harlingen kokerij, Danes Island, Svalbard	Norway	79°43'24" N	0	no	no	Former Dutch whaling station, 1636 to 1662
Kobbefjorden, Danes Island, Svalbard	Norway	79°41'42" N	0	no	no	Former Danish whaling station, 1631 to 1658
Golomyanniy, Sredniy Island, Severnaya Zemlya	Russia	79°33' N	4	no	yes	Meteorological station
Bache Peninsula, Eastern Ellesmere Land, Nunavut	Canada	ca. 79°10 N	0	yes	no	Royal Canadian Mounted Police outpost 1926 to 1933
Qaqaitsut, Eastern Inglefield Land, NW	Greenland (Danish Realm)	ca. 79°07'17.14 N	0	yes	no	Hunting station and former permanent settlement
Inuarfissuaq, Central Inglefield Land, NW	Greenland (Danish Realm)	78°55' N	0	yes	no	Former hunting station or permanent settlement
Ny-Ålesund, Svalbard	Norway	78°55' N	30 (winter) to 180 (summer)	yes	yes	Northernmost civilian and functional settlement; home to the northernmost post office
Alexandra Fiord, Ellesmere Island, Nunavut	Canada	78°53' N	0	no	no	Former Royal Canadian Mounted Police outpost, 1953 to 1963
Isachsen, Ellef Ringnes Island, Nunavut	Canada	78°47' N	0	no	no	Former research station, 1948 to 1978
Pyramiden (Russian), Svalbard	Norway	78°39' N	3 (winter) to 15 (summer)	yes	yes	Former settlement, 1910 to 1998/2000. Peak population over 1200. Now a ghost city for tourists with hotel established in 2013.
Annoatok	Greenland (Danish Realm)	78°33' N	0	yes	no	Former hunting station
Etah	Greenland (Danish Realm)	78°19' N	0	yes	no	Hunting station and former permanent settlement
Longyearbyen, Svalbard	Norway	78°12' N	2,400	yes	yes	Northernmost settlement with a permanent population over 1,000
Barentsburg (Russian), Svalbard	Norway	78°04' N	455	yes	yes	Settlement
North Ice	Greenland (Danish Realm)	78°04' N	0	no	no	Former research station, 1952 to 1954
Sveagruva, Svalbard	Norway	77°55' N	0	yes	no	Former mining town
Siorapaluk	Greenland (Danish Realm)	77°47' N	41	yes	yes	Northernmost public settlement in North America and in Greenland
Cape Chelyuskin	Russia	77°44' N	6	no	yes	Northernmost point in mainland Siberia (weather station)
Qeqertat	Greenland (Danish Realm)	77°29' N	31	yes	yes	Settlement
Qaanaaq (Thule)	Greenland (Danish Realm)	77°28' N	629	yes	yes	Settlement
Camp Century	Greenland (Danish Realm)	77°16' N	0	no	no	United States military scientific research base complete with nuclear reactor, active 1959-1967
Danmarkshavn	Greenland (Danish Realm)	76°46' N	6	no	yes	Meteorological station
Moriusaq	Greenland (Danish Realm)	76°45' N	0	yes	no	Former permanent settlement
Dundas	Greenland (Danish Realm)	76°34' N	0	yes	no	Former settlement, population forcibly relocated to Qaanaaq site in 1953 to make space for nearby Pituffik Space Base; northernmost nuclear-contaminated area in the world after the 1968 Thule Air Base B-52 crash
Pituffik	Greenland (Danish Realm)	76°32' N	0	yes	no	Former settlement, population forcibly relocated to Qaanaaq site in 1953 to make space for nearby Pituffik Space Base; northernmost nuclear-contaminated area in the world after the 1968 Thule Air Base B-52 crash
Hopen	Norway	76°30' N	4	yes	yes	A meteorological station has been placed there.
Narsaarsuk	Greenland (Danish Realm)	76°26' N	0	yes	no	Former settlement; northernmost nuclear contaminated area in the world after the 1968 Thule Air Base B-52 crash
Grise Fiord, Ellesmere Island, Nunavut	Canada	76°25' N	144	yes	yes	Northernmost public settlement in Canada
Mould Bay weather station, Prince Patrick Island, Northwest Territories	Canada	76°18' N	0	no	no	Former meteorological station, 1948 to 1997
Craig Harbour, Ellesmere Island, Nunavut	Canada	76°13' N	0	yes	no	Former settlement
Savissivik	Greenland (Danish Realm)	76°01' N	50	yes	yes	Settlement
Resolute, Cornwallis Island, Nunavut	Canada	74°41' N	183	yes	yes	Settlement
Dundas Harbour, Devon Island, Nunavut	Canada	74°39' N	0	yes	no	Former settlement, 1924 to 1951
Kullorsuaq	Greenland (Danish Realm)	74°34' N	444	yes	yes	Settlement
Ikermiut	Greenland (Danish Realm)	74°20' N	0	yes	no	Former settlement, abandoned in 1954
Daneborg	Greenland (Danish Realm)	74°18' N	12	no	yes	Military and scientific base
Nuussuaq	Greenland (Danish Realm)	74°06' N	181	yes	yes	Settlement
Itissaalik	Greenland (Danish Realm)	74°03' N	0	yes	no	Former settlement, 1904–1909, 1911-1957
Nordvik, Sakha Republic	Russia	74°01' N	0	yes	no	Former settlement and penal colony, 1933 to 1956
Kuuk	Greenland (Danish Realm)	73°42' N	0	yes	no	Former settlement, abandoned in 1972
Nutaarmiut	Greenland (Danish Realm)	73°31' N	43	yes	yes	Settlement
Dikson, Krasnoyarsk Krai	Russia	73°30' N	319	yes	yes	Northernmost settlement in Russia. Northernmost continental (i.e. non-insular) settlement.
Tasiusaq, Avannaata	Greenland (Danish Realm)	73°22' N	249	yes	yes	Settlement
Syndassko, Krasnoyarsk Krai	Russia	73°15' N	531	yes	yes	Settlement
Innaarsuit	Greenland (Danish Realm)	73°11' N	171	yes	yes	Settlement
Naajaat	Greenland (Danish Realm)	73°08' N	45	yes	yes	Settlement
Arctic Bay, Baffin Island, Nunavut	Canada	73°02' N	994	yes	yes	Settlement
Nanisivik, Baffin Island, Nunavut	Canada	73°02' N	0	no	no	Former company town, 1975 to 2002
Ust-Olenyok, Sakha Republic	Russia	72°59' N	27	yes	yes	Settlement
Aappilattoq, Avannaata	Greenland (Danish Realm)	72°53' N	149	yes	yes	Settlement
Novorybnaya, Krasnoyarsk Krai	Russia	72°50' N	490	yes	yes	Settlement
Yuryung-Khaya, Sakha Republic	Russia	72°48' N	1,179	yes	yes	Settlement
Upernavik	Greenland (Danish Realm)	72°47' N	1,090	yes	yes	Settlement
Pond Inlet, Baffin Island, Nunavut	Canada	72°42' N	1,555	yes	yes	Settlement
Taymylyr, Sakha Republic	Russia	72°37' N	755	yes	yes	Settlement
Summit Camp	Greenland (Danish Realm)	72°34' N	5 (winter) to 45 (summer)	no	no	year-round research station at the top of the Greenland Ice Sheet
Kangersuatsiaq	Greenland (Danish Realm)	72°22' N	141	yes	yes	Settlement
Mestersvig	Greenland (Danish Realm)	72°14' N	3	no	yes	Military outpost
Zhdaniha, Krasnoyarsk Krai	Russia	72°10' N	195	yes	yes	Settlement
Upernavik Kujalleq	Greenland (Danish Realm)	72°09' N	201	yes	yes	Settlement
Bykovskiy, Sakha Republic	Russia	72°00' N	513	yes	yes	Settlement
Sachs Harbour, Banks Island, Northwest Territories	Canada	71°59' N	104	yes	yes	Settlement
Ushakovskoye, Chukotka Autonomous Okrug	Russia	71°58' N	0	yes	yes	Former settlement on Wrangel Island. Now used as nature reserve HQ
Khatanga, Krasnoyarsk Krai	Russia	71°58' N	2,645	yes	yes	Settlement
Saskylakh, Sakha Republic	Russia	71°57' N	2,317	yes	yes	Settlement
Kresty, Krasnoyarsk Krai	Russia	71°54' N	275	yes	yes	Settlement
Sklad, Sakha Republic	Russia	71°54' N	10	yes	yes	Settlement
Popigay, Krasnoyarsk Krai	Russia	71°53' N	319	yes	yes	Settlement
Yukagir, Sakha Republic	Russia	71°46' N	128	yes	yes	Settlement
Novaya, Krasnoyarsk Krai	Russia	71°45' N	266	yes	yes	Settlement
Vorontsovo, Krasnoyarsk Krai	Russia	71°41' N	253	yes	yes	Settlement
Tiksi, Sakha Republic	Russia	71°39' N	4,440	yes	yes	Settlement
Rogachevo, Novaya Zemlya	Russia	71°36' N	330	yes	yes	Settlement
Kheta, Krasnoyarsk Krai	Russia	71°34' N	362	yes	yes	Settlement
Nuugaatsiaq	Greenland (Danish Realm)	71°32' N	0	yes	no	Abandoned in 2017 after a tsunami caused by a landslide
Belushya Guba, Novaya Zemlya	Russia	71°32' N	1,972	yes	yes	Main settlement on Novaya Zemlya
Kayak, Krasnoyarsk Krai	Russia	71°30' N	57	yes	yes	Settlement
Nizhneyansk, Sakha Republic	Russia	71°26' N	218	yes	yes	Settlement
Utqiagvik, Alaska	United States	71°18' N	4,927	yes	yes	Northernmost settlement in the United States, formerly Barrow
Katyryk, Krasnoyarsk Krai	Russia	71°16' N	367	yes	yes	Settlement
Illorsuit	Greenland (Danish Realm)	71°14' N	0	yes	no	Abandoned in 2017 after a tsunami
Eismitte	Greenland (Danish Realm)	71°10' N	0	no	no	Former research station, 1930–31
Skarsvåg, Finnmark	Norway	71°08' N	141	yes	yes	Northernmost settlement in Norway proper
Russkoye Ustye, Sakha Republic	Russia	71°07' N	118	yes	yes	Settlement
Gamvik (village), Finnmark	Norway	71°03' N	228	yes	yes	Village
Ukkusissat	Greenland (Danish Realm)	71°02' N	144	yes	yes	Settlement
Mehamn, Gamvik Municipality, Finnmark	Norway	71°02' N	692	yes	yes	Settlement
Akkarfjord, Finnmark	Norway	70°79' N	77	yes	yes	Settlement
Havøysund, Finnmark	Norway	70°59' N	947	yes	yes	Settlement
Honningsvåg, Finnmark	Norway	70°58' N	2,237	yes	yes	City
Volochanka, Krasnoyarsk Krai	Russia	70°58' N	436	yes	yes	Settlement
Olonkinbyen, Jan Mayen	Norway	70°55' N	18	no	yes	Capital and only settlement of Jan Mayen, primarily a military and weather base
Ust-Yansk, Sakha Republic	Russia	70°54' N	257	yes	yes	Settlement
Gyda, Yamalo-Nenets Autonomous Okrug	Russia	70°53' N	3,610	yes	yes	Settlement
Berlevåg, Finnmark	Norway	70°51' N	867	yes	yes	Village, municipality seat
Naiba, Sakha Republic	Russia	70°50' N	473	yes	yes	Settlement
Saattut	Greenland (Danish Realm)	70°48' N	259	yes	yes	Settlement
Khayyr, Sakha Republic	Russia	70°48' N	419	yes	yes	Settlement
Skjånes, Finnmark	Norway	70°48' N	60–70	yes	yes	Settlement
Niaqornat	Greenland (Danish Realm)	70°47' N	34	yes	yes	Settlement
Kazache, Sakha Republic	Russia	70°45' N	1,188	yes	yes	Settlement
Ulukhaktok, Victoria Island, Northwest Territories	Canada	70°44'N	408	yes	yes	Settlement
Qaarsut	Greenland (Danish Realm)	70°43' N	161	yes	yes	Settlement
Kongsfjord, Finnmark	Norway	70°43' N	32	yes	yes	Settlement
Forsøl, Finnmark	Norway	70°43' N	213	yes	yes	Village
Kyusyur, Sakha Republic	Russia	70°41' N	1,345	yes	yes	Settlement
Uummannaq	Greenland (Danish Realm)	70°40' N	1,407	yes	yes	Town
Hammerfest, Finnmark	Norway	70°39' N	7,882	yes	yes	City
Wainwright, Alaska	United States	70°38' N	628	yes	yes	Town
Rypefjord, Finnmark	Norway	70°38' N	1,775	yes	yes	Village
Båtsfjord, Finnmark	Norway	70°38' N	2,151	yes	yes	Village, municipality seat
Chokurdakh, Sakha Republic	Russia	70°37' N	1,832	yes	yes	Settlement
Kårhamn, Finnmark	Norway	70°32' N	22	yes	yes	Settlement
Ikerasak	Greenland (Danish Realm)	70°30' N	229	yes	yes	Settlement
Ittoqqortoormiit	Greenland (Danish Realm)	70°29' N	352	yes	yes	Settlement
Atqasuk, Alaska	United States	70°28' N	276	yes	yes	Settlement
Clyde River, Baffin Island, Nunavut	Canada	70°28' N	1,181	yes	yes	Settlement
Prudhoe Bay, Alaska	United States	70°19' N	1,310	yes	yes	Census-designated place Northern end of the Alaskan Pipeline
Alpine, Alaska	United States	70°14' N	250	yes	yes	Work camp; former census-designated place; oil discovered in 1996
Nuiqsut, Alaska	United States	70°12' N	512	yes	yes	Settlement
Deadhorse, Alaska	United States	70°12' N	25 to 50 (permanent) to 3,000 (temporary)	yes	yes	Northernmost point on Western Hemisphere road network
Kaktovik, Alaska	United States	70°07' N	283	yes	yes	Settlement
Nuorgam, Lapland	Finland	70°05' N	200	yes	yes	Northernmost settlement in Finland and European Union
Saqqaq	Greenland (Danish Realm)	70°00' N	160	yes	yes	Settlement - site name for the Saqqaq culture

== Cities and towns ==
This is a list of the northernmost cities and towns in the world.

City/town	Population	Latitude/longitude
Ny-Ålesund, Svalbard, Norway	30–130	78°55′30″N 011°55′20″E
Pyramiden (Russian), Svalbard, Norway	8–60	78°39′22″N 016°19′30″E
Longyearbyen, Svalbard, Norway	2,400	78°13′00″N 015°33′00″E
Barentsburg (Russian), Svalbard, Norway	455	78°04′00″N 014°13′00″E
Siorapaluk, Greenland, Denmark	34	77°47′N 70°38′W
Qeqertat, Greenland, Denmark	26	77°29′N 66°41′W
Qaanaaq, Greenland, Denmark	629	77°28′N 69°20′W
Grise Fiord, Ellesmere Island, Canada	144	76°25′N 82°53′W
Savissivik, Greenland, Denmark	55	76°01′N 65°06′W
Resolute, Cornwallis Island, Canada	183	74°41′N 094°49′W
Kullorsuaq, Greenland, Denmark	441	74°34′N 57°13′W
Nuussuaq, Greenland, Denmark	181	74°06′N 57°03′W
Nutaarmuit, Greenland, Denmark	36	73°31′N 56°26′W
Dikson, Russia	319	73°30′N 80°31′E
Tasiusaq, Greenland, Denmark	252	73°22′N 56°03′W
Innaarsuit, Greenland, Denmark	171	73°11′N 56°00′E
Arctic Bay, Baffin Island, Canada	994	73°02′11″N 085°09′09″W
Aappilattoq, Greenland, Denmark	149	72°53′N 55°36′W
Upernavik, Greenland, Denmark	1,090	72°47′N 56°09′W
Pond Inlet, Baffin Island, Canada	1,555	72°42′00″N 077°57′40″W
Bykovsky, Russia	513	72°00′N 129°06′E
Khatanga, Russia	2,645	71°58′N 102°28′E
Yukagir, Russia	128	71°45′N 139°53′E
Tiksi, Russia	4,440	71°39′N 128°48′E
Belushya Guba, Russia	1,972	71°33′N 52°19′E
Nizhneyansk, Russia	218	71°26′N 136°04′E
Utqiaġvik, Alaska, United States	4,927	71°18′N 156°44′W
Mehamn, Norway	692	71°02′N 27°50′E
Havøysund, Norway	947	70°59′N 24°39′E
Honningsvåg, Norway	2,237	70°58′N 25°58′E
Gyda, Russia	3,610	70°53′N 78°29′E
Berlevåg, Norway	867	70°51′N 29°05′E
Kyusyur, Russia	1,345	70°41′N 127°22′E
Uummannaq, Greenland, Denmark	1,407	70°40′N 52°07′W
Hammerfest, Norway	7,882	70°39′N 23°41′E
Rypefjord, Norway	1,775	70°38′N 23°40′E
Båtsfjord, Norway	2,151	70°38′N 29°43′E
Chokurdakh, Russia	1,832	70°37′N 147°54′E
Wainwright, Alaska, United States	628	70°38′N 160°00′W
Ittoqqortoormiit, Greenland, Denmark	352	70°29′N 21°58′W
Atqasuk, Alaska, United States	276	70°28′N 157°25′W
Clyde River, Baffin Island, Canada	1,181	70°28′N 68°35′W
Vardø, Norway	1,690	70°22′N 31°06′E
Nuiqsut, Alaska, United States	512	70°12′N 151°00′W
Deadhorse, Alaska, United States	25–3,000	70°12′N 148°30′W
Kaktovik, Alaska, United States	283	70°07′N 143°36′W
Nuorgam, Finland	200	70°05′N 27°53′E
Vadsø, Norway	4,615	70°04′N 29°44′E
Lakselv, Norway	2,245	70°03′N 24°57′E
Skjervøy, Norway	2,426	70°02′N 20°58′E
Alta, Norway	15,784	69°58′N 23°17′E
Utsjoki, Finland	319	69°54′N 027°01′E
Kirkenes, Norway	3,383	69°43′N 30°03′E
Pevek, Russia	4,230	69°42′N 170°17′E
Bjørnevatn, Norway	2,553	69°40′N 29°58′E
Tromsø, Norway	79,604	69°39′N 18°57′E
Pechenga, Russia	2,206	69°33′N 31°13′E
Taloyoak, Canada	934	69°32′N 093°31′W
Tuktoyaktuk, Canada	937	69°26′N 133°2′W
Zapolyarny, Russia	14,791	69°25′N 30°48′E
Dudinka, Russia	19,556	69°24′N 86°11′E
Nikel, Russia	9,858	69°24′N 30°13′E
Paulatuk, Canada	265	69°23′N 123°58′E
Zaozyorsk, Russia	7,762	69°23′N 32°26′E
Igloolik, Canada	2,049	69°22′N 81°48′W
Norilsk, Russia	174,453	69°20′N 88°13′E
Vidyayevo, Russia	4,327	69°19′N 32°48′E
Andenes, Norway	2,487	69°19′N 16°08′E
Gadzhiyevo, Russia	9,297	69°15′N 33°21′E
Qeqertarsuaq, Greenland, Denmark	844	69°14′N 53°33′W
Ilulissat, Greenland, Denmark	4,848	69°13′N 51°06′W
Finnsnes, Norway	4,771	69°13′N 17°58′E
Polyarny, Russia	12,293	69°12′N 33°27′E
Snezhnogorsk, Russia	9,942	69°11′N 33°13′E
Cambridge Bay, Victoria Island, Canada	1,760	69°06′N 105°03′W
Severomorsk, Russia	43,327	69°04′N 33°25′E
Kilpisjärvi, Enontekiö, Finland	114	69°02′57″N 20°47′40″E
Murmansk, Russia	270,384	68°58′N 33°04′E
Inari (village), Inari, Finland	617	68°54′20″N 27°01′40″E
Kola, Russia	9,016	68°52′N 33°01′E
Setermoen, Norway	2,523	68°51′N 18°20′E
Murmashi, Russia	9,568	68°49′N 32°49′E
Qasigiannguit, Greenland, Denmark	1,037	68°49′N 51°11′W
Harstad, Norway	21,132	68°47′N 16°32′E
Sanirajak, Canada	2,049	68°47′N 81°14′W
Chersky, Russia	2,641	68°45′N 161°18′E
Kolymskoye	765	68°44′N 158°42′E
Aasiaat, Greenland, Denmark	2,903	68°43′N 52°39′W
Sortland, Norway	5,487	68°41′N 15°24′E
Ivalo, Finland	3,034	68°39′N 27°33′E
Gjoa Haven, Canada	1,349	68°37′N 95°52′W
Stokmarknes, Norway	3,451	68°33′N 14°54′E
Kugaaruk, Canada	1,033	68°32′N 89°49′W
Melbu, Norway	2,245	68°30′N 14°50′E
Kaaresuvanto, Enontekiö, Finland	140	68°26′57″N 022°29′04″E
Narvik, Norway	14,035	68°26′N 17°25′E
Karesuando, Sweden	279	68°26′N 22°28′E
Hetta, Enontekiö, Finland	800	68°23′N 023°39′E
Inuvik, Canada	3,137	68°21′N 133°43′W
Point Hope, Alaska, United States	830	68°20′N 166°45′W
Kangaatsiaq, Greenland, Denmark	507	68°18′N 53°27′W
Suchchino, Russia	33	68°15′N 152°23′E
Svolvær, Norway	4,751	68°14′N 14°34′E
Olenegorsk, Russia	21,438	68°09′N 33°17′E
Leknes, Norway	3,722	68°08′N 13°36′E
Anaktuvuk Pass, Alaska, United States	425	68°08′N 151°44′W
Snezhnogorsk, Russia	784	68°05′N 87°46′E
Bilibino, Russia	5,409	68°03′N 166°27′E
Ostrovnoy, Russia	1,487	68°03′N 39°30′E
Lovozero, Russia	2,110	68°00′N 35°03′E
Muonio, Finland	2,279	67°57.5′N 023°41′E
Kiruna, Sweden	17,284	67°51′N 20°13′E
Kugluktuk, Canada	1,382	67°49′N 115°05′W
Kuberganya, Russia	479	67°46′N 144°29′E
Vittangi, Sweden	743	67°40′37″N 21°38′42″E
Kittilä, Finland	2,192	67°39′N 024°54.5′E
Svappavaara, Sweden	392	67°38′51″N 21°3′15″E
Naryan-Mar, Russia	23,399	67°38′N 53°03′E
Apatity, Russia	49,647	67°34′N 33°24′E
Qikiqtarjuaq, Broughton Island, Canada	593	67°33′N 64°01′W
Vorkuta, Russia	56,985	67°30′N 64°02′E
Khatyngnakh, Russia	241	67°29′N 152°36′E
Sodankylä, Finland	4,865	67°25′N 26°35′E
Kolari, Finland	1,070	67°19′50″N 023°46′40″E
Bodø, Norway	52,803	67°16′N 14°24′E
Fauske, Norway	9,603	67°15′N 15°23′E
Pajala, Sweden	1,962	67°12′N 23°22′E
Kandalaksha, Russia	29,138	67°09′N 32°24′E
Gällivare, Sweden	12,385	67°07′N 20°45′E

== Larger cities ==
Northernmost cities with more than 100,000 inhabitants. The population data may include municipalities, urban areas or metropolitan areas.

City	Population	Latitude/longitude	Köppen climate classification
Norilsk, Russia	174,453	69°20′N 88°13′E	Dfc
Murmansk, Russia	270,384	68°58′N 33°05′E	Dfc
Novy Urengoy, Russia	107,251	66°04′N 76°37′E	Dfc
Oulu, Finland	214,633	65°00′N 25°26′E	Dfc
Severodvinsk, Russia	157,213	64°34′N 39°49′E	Dfc
Arkhangelsk, Russia	301,199	64°32′N 40°32′E	Dfc
Reykjavík, Iceland	139,875	64°08′N 21°56′W	Cfc
Umeå, Sweden	132,235	63°49′N 20°16′E	Dfc
Trondheim, Norway	212,660	63°25′N 10°23′E	Dfb
Noyabrsk, Russia	100,188	63°12′N 75°27′E	Dfc
Kuopio, Finland	124,021	62°53′N 27°40′E	Dfb
Jyväskylä, Finland	147,746	62°14′N 25°44′E	Dfc
Yakutsk, Russia	355,443	62°02′N 129°44′E	Dfc
Petrozavodsk, Russia	234,897	61°47′N 34°21′E	Dfb
Syktyvkar, Russia	220,580	61°40′N 50°49′E	Dfc
Tampere, Finland	255,050	61°29′N 23°45′E	Dfb
Surgut, Russia	396,443	61°16′N 73°24′E	Dfc
Anchorage, Alaska, United States	287,145	61°13′N 149°53′W	Dfc
Nefteyugansk, Russia	124,732	61°05′N 72°42′E	Dfc
Lahti, Finland	120,693	60°59′N 025°39′E	Dfb
Gävle, Sweden	103,493	60°40′29″N 017°08′30″E	Dfb
Turku, Finland	201,863	60°27′N 022°16′E	Dfb
Bergen, Norway	289,330	60°23′33″N 005°19′24″E	Cfb
Vantaa, Finland	247,443	60°17′40″N 025°02′25″E	Dfb

Northernmost cities with more than 250,000 inhabitants.

City	Population	Latitude/longitude	Köppen climate classification
Murmansk, Russia	270,384	68°58′N 33°05′E	Dfc
Arkhangelsk, Russia	301,199	64°32′N 40°32′E	Dfc
Yakutsk, Russia	355,443	62°02′N 129°44′E	Dfc
Tampere, Finland	255,050	61°29′N 23°45′E	Dfb
Surgut, Russia	396,443	61°16′N 73°24′E	Dfc
Anchorage, Alaska, United States	287,145	61°13′N 149°53′W	Dfc
Bergen, Norway	289,330	60°23′33″N 005°19′24″E	Cfb
Espoo, Finland	314,024	60°12′20″N 024°39′20″E	Dfb
Helsinki, Finland	674,500	60°10′15″N 024°56′15″E	Dfb
Saint Petersburg, Russia	5,598,486	59°56′15″N 030°18′31″E	Dfb
Oslo, Norway	709,037	59°55′00″N 010°44′00″E	Dfb
Tallinn, Estonia	437,811	59°26′14″N 024°44′43″E	Dfb
Stockholm, Sweden	987,661	59°19′46″N 018°04′07″E	Dfb

== See also ==
- Southernmost settlements
- Extremes on Earth
- List of northernmost items
- List of research stations in the Arctic
