= Urodan =

Urodan Уродан Уродаан (Sakha)
- Selo
- Interactive map of Urodan
- Location of Urodan Urodan (Sakha Republic)
- Coordinates: 66°42′09″N 155°28′49″E
- Country: Russia
- Federal subject: Sakha Republic
- Administrative district: Srednekolymsky District
- Rural okrugSelsoviet: Berezovsky National Nomadic Rural Okrug

Population (2010 Census)
  - Total: 8
  - Estimate (2021): 3 (−62.5%)

Municipal status
  - Municipal district: Srednekolymsky Municipal District
  - Rural settlement: Berezovsky National Nomadic Rural Settlement
- Time zone: UTC+
- Postal code: 678789
- OKTMO ID: 98646415106

Urodan (Russian: Уродан; Yakut: Уродаан, Urodaan) is a rural locality (a selo), and one of two settlements in Berezovsky National Nomadic Rural Okrug of Srednekolymsky District in the Sakha Republic, Russia, in addition to Berezovka, the administrative center of the Rural Okrug. It is located 174 kilometers (108 mi) from Srednekolymsk, the administrative center of the district and 41 kilometers (25 mi) from Berezovka. Its population as of the 2010 Census was 8; down from 25 recorded during the 2002 Census.
