= Novaya, Krasnoyarsk Krai =

Novaya Новая
- Village
- Location within Krasnoyarsk Krai Location within Russia Location within Arctic
- Coordinates: 71°44′51″N 101°13′28″E
- Country: Russia
- Krai: Krasnoyarsk
- District: Taymyrsky Dolgano-Nenetsky District
- Rural settlement: Khatanga
- Rural settlement district: Novinsky

Area
  - Total: 0.257 km^{2} (0.099 sq mi)

Population (2020)
  - Total: 266
  - Density: 1,040/km^{2} (2,680/sq mi)
- Time zone: UTC+7 (KRAT)
- Postal code: 647485

Novaya (Russian: Новая) is one of the northernmost villages in Russia and the world, located in Taymyrsky Dolgano-Nenetsky District, Krasnoyarsk Krai, along the Kheta river. The village can be reached either by boat or by helicopter, and has its own radio station.

== History ==
Novaya was first officially settled as a hunting and fishing village by the Nganasan people in 1937. In 1938, a collective farm named after Alexei Stakhanov was established in Novaya that hired twenty Dolgan families from the broader Taymyr Peninsula. Upon construction of a boarding school in Novaya in 1953, the economy began to develop faster. Further migration of Nganasans to Novaya occurred gradually from 1960 until 1990. The Novaya boarding school was used by children from nearby villages, such as Kartyrk. Most of these children travelled to Novaya by flight, and some reportedly rode reindeers to the boarding school. In the 1990s, Nganasans from elsewhere in the Taymyr peninsula were negatively impacted by the fall of the Soviet Union and the corresponding dissolution of collectivized reindeer farms they economically relied on. As a result, a significant number were forced to relocate to Novaya and other settlements along the Kheta river known for their fishing economies. In 1996, a group of Finnish filmmakers filmed a documentary in Novaya. Novaya gained its own officially recognized rural settlement district in 2006.

== Demographics ==
Year	Population	Additional information
2002	313	2002 Russian census
2004	365	None
2008	314	308 people belonged to indigenous minorities of the North.
2010	313	2010 Russian census
2012	288	None
2014	294	None
2017	292	None
2018	292	286 people belonged to indigenous minorities of the North.
2019	334	266 people of Dolgan descent.
2020	266	82% of the population were Dolgans, and 18% were Nganasans.

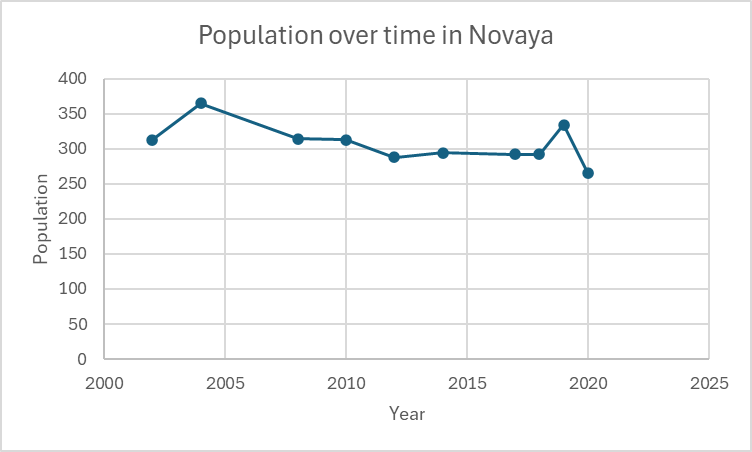
Graph of Novaya's population over time

== Environment ==
=== Ecology ===
Trees in Novaya contain Taimyr amber, which has special characteristics only found in the Taymyr peninsula, but no ants – implying historical presence of Taymyr ants.

=== Climate ===
The climate is close to arctic, with long winters, polar nights, severe frosts and short summers:

- The average annual temperature is -13 °C (-30 °C winter, 12 °C summer)
- Snow cover lies eight to nine months per year.
- Precipitation is 110-350 mm per year.
- Open-ground agriculture is impossible in the winter.
- The polar night lasts from November 10 to February 1, and the polar day last from May 13 to August 6.

== Economy ==
Novaya's economy mostly relies on hunting and fishing. Novaya is one stop along the Kheta river that a boat from a cargo port upstream regularly unloads goods and village supplies onto. Helicopters from Khatanga Airport also fly periodically to Novaya to drop off cargo. The village has a helipad, a post office, a kindergarten-primary hybrid boarding school, an emergency clinic, a housing committee building, a grocery store, a supermarket, a diesel power station, a cultural center, a police station, a mine and a library. The local 'Kotuy-Novaya' mine was set up in 2009 by the municipal government, with its construction funded by liquidation of the larger 'Kotuy' mine located along the Kotuy river.

== Society and culture ==
The village still has a large presence of Nganasan indigenous people, making up a significant minority of the population alongside Dolgans – the population being mostly sedentary as opposed to nomadic. The Nganasan language is also the main language in Novaya, spoken in the Vadeyev Nganasan accent. Local Nganasan figure 'Aunt Dasha' is regularly worshiped as part of their indigenous traditions. Shamans are also present. Missionaries from the Norilsk Orthodox Church visited Novaya in 2016, at night. In 2022, a community project was funded by a charity to promote sports and recreational activities for the residents of Novaya.

=== Quality of life ===
According to a quality of life evaluation study carried out by Siberian Federal University in 2018, a questionnaire revealed that:

- Novaya residents perceived their labor conditions and employment (using qualitative metrics such as occupation stability, workplace convenience and territorial accessibility to work) as adequate; rating them 2.8/3 on average.
- Recreational and healthcare facilities enjoyed a similar reputation, but their numbers and accessibility were deemed insufficient.
- Cultural and social facilities and Novaya were viewed as excellent but transportation and road quality was seen as very poor.
- Housing quality and availability were deemed average.

Overall, Novaya residents saw their own quality of life as 'average' according to the conclusion of the study.
