= Roman, Sakha Republic =

Roman Роман Роман (Sakha)
- Selo
- Interactive map of Roman
- Location of Roman Roman (Sakha Republic)
- Coordinates: 68°37′30″N 154°55′10″E
- Country: Russia
- Federal subject: Sakha Republic
- Administrative district: Srednekolymsky District
- Rural okrugSelsoviet: Sen-Kyuyolsky Rural Okrug

Population (2010 Census)
  - Total: 0
  - Estimate (2021): 0 )

Municipal status
  - Municipal district: Srednekolymsky Municipal District
  - Rural settlement: Sen-Kyuyolsky Settlement
- Time zone: UTC+
- Postal code: 678786
- OKTMO ID: 98646442106

Roman (Russian: Роман; Yakut: Роман) is a rural locality (a selo), and one of two settlements in Sen-Kyuyolsky Rural Okrug of Srednekolymsky District in the Sakha Republic, Russia, in addition to Oyusardakh, the administrative center of the Rural Okrug. It is located 229 kilometers (142 mi) from Srednekolymsk, the administrative center of the district and 60 kilometers (37 mi) from Oyusardakh. Its population as of the 2010 Census was 0; the same as recorded during the 2002 Census.
