= Nalimsk =

Nalimsk Налимск Налимскай (Sakha)
- Selo
- Interactive map of Nalimsk
- Location of Nalimsk Nalimsk (Sakha Republic)
- Coordinates: 67°35′N 153°39′E
- Country: Russia
- Federal subject: Sakha Republic
- Administrative district: Srednekolymsky District
- Rural okrugSelsoviet: Baydinsky Rural Okrug
- Elevation: 18 m (59 ft)

Population (2010 Census)
  - Total: 502
  - Estimate (2021): 418 (−16.7%)

Administrative status
  - Capital of: Baydinsky Rural Okrug

Municipal status
  - Municipal district: Srednekolymsky Municipal District
  - Rural settlement: Baydinsky Rural Settlement
  - Capital of: Baydinsky Rural Settlement
- Time zone: UTC+
- Postal code: 678784
- OKTMO ID: 98646410101

Nalimsk (Russian: Налимск; Yakut: Налимскай) is a rural locality (a selo), the only inhabited locality, and the administrative center of Baydinsky Rural Okrug of Srednekolymsky District in the Sakha Republic, Russia, located 18 kilometers (11 mi) from Srednekolymsk, the administrative center of the district. Its population as of the 2010 Census was 502, up from 498 recorded during the 2002 Census.
