= Aleko-Kyuyol =

Aleko-Kyuyol Алеко-Кюёль Өлөөкө Күөл (Sakha)
- Selo
- Interactive map of Aleko-Kyuyol
- Location of Aleko-Kyuyol Aleko-Kyuyol (Sakha Republic)
- Coordinates: 68°40′45″N 151°52′52″E
- Country: Russia
- Federal subject: Sakha Republic
- Administrative district: Srednekolymsky District
- Rural okrugSelsoviet: Kangalassky 1-y Rural Okrug
- Elevation: 32 m (105 ft)

Population (2010 Census)
  - Total: 557
  - Estimate (2021): 512 (−8.1%)

Administrative status
  - Capital of: Kangalassky 1-y Rural Okrug

Municipal status
  - Municipal district: Srednekolymsky Municipal District
  - Rural settlement: Kangalassky 1-y Rural Settlement
  - Capital of: Kangalassky 1-y Rural Settlement
- Time zone: UTC+
- Postal code: 678782
- OKTMO ID: 98646420101

Aleko-Kyuyol (Russian: Алеко-Кюёль) or Ölöökö Küöl (Yakut: Өлөөкө Күөл) is a rural locality (a selo), the administrative center of, and one of two settlements in addition to Soyangi in Kangalassky 1-y Rural Okrug of Srednekolymsky District in the Sakha Republic, Russia, located 218 kilometers (135 mi) from Srednekolymsk, the administrative center of the district. Its population as of the 2010 Census was 557; down from 654 recorded during the 2002 Census.
