= Sylgy-Ytar =

Sylgy-Ytar Сылгы-Ытар Сылгы Ыытар (Sakha)
- Selo
- Interactive map of Sylgy-Ytar
- Location of Sylgy-Ytar Sylgy-Ytar (Sakha Republic)
- Coordinates: 67°51′05″N 154°49′09″E
- Country: Russia
- Federal subject: Sakha Republic
- Administrative district: Srednekolymsky District
- Rural okrugSelsoviet: Myatissky 1-y Rural Okrug
- Elevation: 39 m (128 ft)

Population (2010 Census)
  - Total: 522
  - Estimate (2021): 440 (−15.7%)

Administrative status
  - Capital of: Myatissky 1-y Rural Okrug

Municipal status
  - Municipal district: Srednekolymsky Municipal District
  - Rural settlement: Myatissky 1-y Rural Settlement
  - Capital of: Myatissky 1-y Rural Settlement
- Time zone: UTC+
- Postal code: 678787
- OKTMO ID: 98646435101

Sylgy-Ytar (Russian: Сылгы-Ытар; Yakut: Сылгы Ыытар, Sılgı Iıtar) is a rural locality (a selo), the only inhabited locality, and the administrative center of Myatissky 1-y Rural Okrug of Srednekolymsky District in the Sakha Republic, Russia, located 97 kilometers (60 mi) from Srednekolymsk, the administrative center of the district. Its population as of the 2010 Census was 522, down from 648 recorded during the 2002 Census.
