= Zhdanikha =

Zhdanikha Жданиха
- Village
- Location within Krasnoyarsk Krai Location within Russia Location within Arctic
- Coordinates: 72°10′13″N 102°51′45″E
- Country: Russia
- Krai: Krasnoyarsk
- District: Taymyrsky Dolgano-Nenetsky District
- Rural settlement: Khatanga
- Rural settlement district: Zhdanikha

Area
  - Total: 0.0580 km^{2} (0.0224 sq mi)
- Elevation: 9 m (30 ft)

Population (2023)
  - Total: 175
  - Density: 3,020/km^{2} (7,810/sq mi)
- Time zone: UTC+7 (KRAT)
- Postal code: 647470

Zhdanikha (Russian: Жданиха, literally 'Waiting Woman') is one of the northernmost villages in Russia and the world, located in Taymyrsky Dolgano-Nenetsky District, Krasnoyarsk Krai, along the Kotuy river. The village is mainly connected to the outside world by boat and helicopter, and was one of 285 locations sponsored by the Krasnoyarsk Krai film commission.

== Demographics ==
Zhdanikha's population has been on a fluctuating net decrease since 2008, with immigrants rare and eliciting communal surprise:

Year	Population	Additional information
2008	237	232 belonged to ethnic minorities of the North.
2010	205	2010 Russian census
2016	227 (estimated)	Consisted mainly of Dolgan people, but also Nganasans and Russians. Approximately 131 were employed and approximately 22 worked at the two major ranches in Zhdanikha. Around 23 residents were considered temporary nomads.
2017	149	None
2018	192	188 belonged to ethnic minorities of the North.
2020	195	None
2022	171	January 2022
2022	175	April 2022
2023	175	None

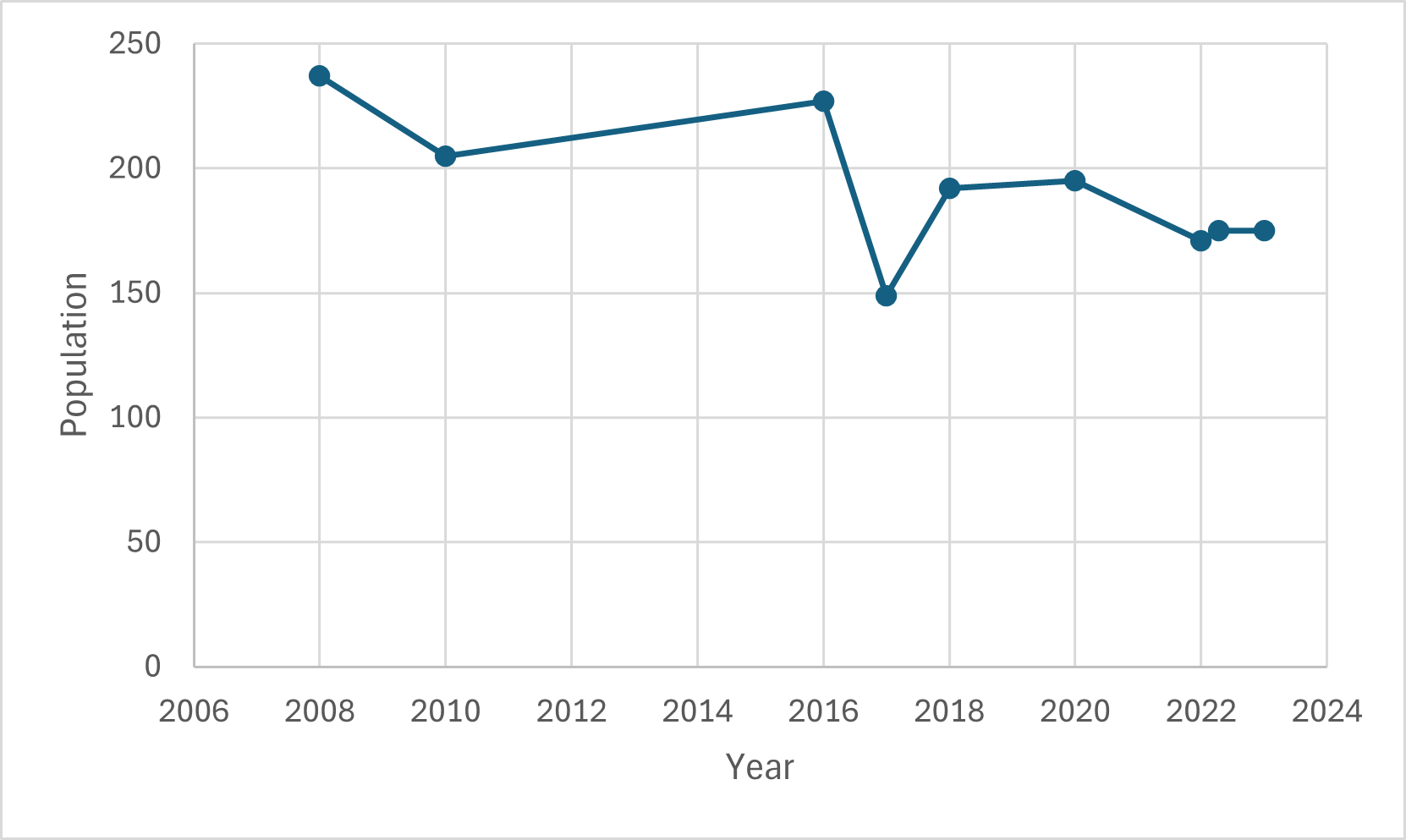
Population graph of Zhdanikha

== History ==
According to an archaeological study by the Arctic Studies Center of Smithsonian Institution, large flaked pebbles resembling Paleolithic and early Iron Age era tools can be found in the part of the Kotuy river that Zhdanikha is adjacent to, but excavations and lithic analysis imply that the village as it is known today was likely first inhabited towards the end of the first millennium AD.

Zhdanikha was recorded to be mentioned the first time in 1908, inside a St. Petersburg Russian newspaper article named 'Siberian Questions'. The article criticized Zhdanikha's infrastructure and culture, and claimed that only one family lived in the village, and that the population was subject to seasonal variation.

The village was founded by German settlers from the Volga region and was officially recognized by the Soviet government in 1942, when a collective farm was established in Zhdanikha named 'Molotov', the first ranch in the Khatanga region, employing both the local population and non-residents to fish, breed deer, and hunt other animals. The collective farm was run by Diehl Julia Andreevna and reportedly had repressive working conditions. Many German soldiers who died in World War II at the hand of Soviet forces were buried in Zhdanikha's cemetery in unmarked graves, alongside Soviet nationals exiled by Stalin's government from different parts of the country, like the Baltic republics, to Zhdanikha.

This farm was later renamed 'Zary' and run by a German man named Verveyn Karl. Verveyn Karl assigned tasks to the collective farm workers discriminately, with ethnically Russian workers having obligations of canning mushrooms and berries, while indigenous workers were tasked with growing vegetables - yielding radishes at three harvests per season.

The farm was renamed again in 1959 to 'Lenin'. The chairman position was given to a native of the village named Portnyagin Trifon Ilyich. During his chairmanship, a post office, shops and bakeries were constructed in the village, along with several smaller, peripheral farms that bred black-brown and arctic foxes. The constructions, in part, used prison labor of political prisoners. Workers were given more liberty to pursue a wider range of hunting activities of their choosing, according to their ability to work.

In 1975, another state fishing farm was established beside Lenin named 'Central', which was founded by six officials including Chardu Proskovia Konstantinovna, Popov Nikolay Nikolaevich, Chuprin Gennady Ivanovich, and three others, and run by three chairpeople: Afanasiy Spiridonov, Mariya Nikolaevna Datsyuk, and finally Anna Ivanovna Lavreshyk, who was responsible for most of the farm's development. In the 1980s, another chairman was appointed named Bogomolniy Anatoly Lvovich, who oversaw further development of the village outside the fishing farm, including construction of residential homes, power plants, a workshop, a hybrid boarding school named 'Zhdanikhovskaya' (kindergarten and primary school level education) and an administrative building. The Lenin farm was later renamed 'Barak'.

In 1981, a Mil Mi-8 Soviet aircraft commissioned in 1975 crashed nearby Zhadinkha, rolling over on its side, but there were no casualties.

In 1991, the Zhdanikha village council head Nadezhda Chuprina, who remained the village council head until 2016 at the earliest and 2021 at the latest, made comments about the resilience of the village farms' successful fur farming activities, especially blue fox fur - in an attempt to reassure residents about the negative economic affects caused by the Soviet Union's collapse. Since technology and government services were temporarily unavailable, many farm workers became unemployed, with only experienced farmers able to retain their jobs despite the instability.

== Economy ==
The village's previous reliance of state infrastructure has contributed to the local economy's slow recovery, with the private sector's entrance introducing some new employment, but not at a fast enough pace. Since 1991, the Central farm has been privatized as a fishing cooperative but the Barak farm remains government-owned. The Central cooperative farm was officially registered with local, regional and federal tax authorities in 2003 and is still run by Bogomolniy Anatoly Lvovich as of 2025. The farm's authorized capital is 10,000 rubles ($130) and is shared among six employees who founded the farm, after remaining employees were forced to liquidate their shares in 2015 by regulators. The farm has lost, in total, 580,000 rubles ($7,000) in arbitration cases.

A country club, a library, another post office, a supermarket and a hospital were also built between 1991 and 2016, along with a police station and a secondary school merged with the pre-existing hybrid boarding school - this hybrid school became legally recognized as a secondary school in 2019 and is now run by Chuprina Maria Vasilievna. It has been inspected by local government nine times since 2004, in which educational violations were found on four separate occasions. The secondary school has filed three lawsuits since 2004 against independent defendants and spends around 4,000,000 rubles ($50,000) per year, on average, on its own maintenance.

In 2014, the village council head at the time Nadezhda Chuprina was interviewed by Siberian Federal University as part of an economic study examining the feasibility of establishing nature management areas as a means of providing disadvantaged local ethnic minorities employment. The overall response from representatives in the Khatanga region was mixed towards the proposal. As of 2015, fishing and reindeer hunting remain the main drivers of Zhdanikha's local economy according to a subsequent study by Siberian Federal University a year later. The village council head has been Cherepanova Vera Ivanovna since 2022, and she oversees the "Village Is Our Home" economic project conducted by the municipal government to promote economic activity for ethnic minorities.

=== Infrastructure ===
In 2011, a private contractor was ordered by the local government to conduct an energy audit on the administrative building, school, diesel power plant and country club in Zhdanikha, and restore faults with the village's power supply. In 2018, Rostelecom provided Internet services to Zhdanikha as part of a Krasnoyarsk regional government contract costing 500,000 rubles ($6,000). In 2024, the local government paid 170,000 rubles ($2,000) for new power transmission lines to be constructed in Zhdanikha by a different private contractor.

== Society and culture ==
=== Quality of life ===
According to a quality of life evaluation study carried out by Siberian Federal University in 2018, a questionnaire revealed that:

- Zhdanikha residents perceived their labor conditions and employment (using qualitative metrics such as occupation stability, workplace convenience and territorial accessibility to work) as adequate; rating them 2.8/3 on average.
- Recreational and healthcare facilities enjoyed a similar reputation, but their numbers and accessibility were deemed insufficient.
- Cultural and social facilities and Zhdanikha were viewed as excellent but transportation and road quality was seen as very poor (six small streets and no main streets).
- Housing quality and availability were deemed average.

Overall, Zhdanikha residents saw their own quality of life as 'below-average' according to the conclusion of the study.

=== Nutrition ===
Zhdanikha was one of two villages (along with Kresty) where researchers from Siberian Federal University conducted a survey in August 2019 to study residents' opinions about healthy eating principles, dietary habits, and factors influencing them. The study included 108 respondents (20% of the total population of both villages combined), with equal gender representation.

Key findings about nutrition in Zhdanikha and Kresty combined:

- 52% of respondents admitted they don't follow healthy eating principles
- 94% characterized their eating pattern as "three-to-four meals per day at home"
- 92% consume fresh fruits and vegetables only 1-2 times per month
- 82% consume fast food with the same frequency (1-2 times per month)
- 61% said they don't follow any particular dietary principles
- Only 5% considered their diet truly healthy
- 85% sometimes use enriched food products, while 15% were unaware of such products

The researchers concluded that dietary habits were largely influenced by limited access to certain food categories rather than lack of awareness about healthy eating. The study found a correlation between fruit/vegetable consumption and fast food consumption, suggesting both are limited by availability rather than choice. When asked what could influence dietary changes toward healthier eating, 58% cited positive examples from relatives and friends as the most important factor.

=== Cultural initiatives ===
In 2012, political activist groups established a KMNS multi-purpose organization 'Ogonyor' (Old Man), a youth council and a women's council within the village's country club. The women's council mainly engages in reindeer breeding and has been run by Chuprina Snezhana Afanasyevna since 2022. Ogonyor provides legal representation for indigenous peoples in the village, but also engages in reindeer breeding and other miscellaneous activities within the country club. Its founding chairperson is Chuprina Elena Semenovna. The organization has been fined twice, receives special tax treatment by federal tax authorities, and is associated with the Central cooperative farm.

Alongside the "Village Is Our Home" economic project, in 2023, the rural settlement district launched a cultural project "Preserving The Traditions of the North", which incentivizes residents to produce products associated with the ethnic minorities of the North like fur, suede, fish skin, mammoth bone, deer antler, and wood. Cargo for the cultural project was intended to be delivered from Krasnoyarsk but failed to arrive at Zhdanikha due to harsh weather conditions and insufficient transport routes to Zhdanikha. Local business owner Batamunko Zhapov later volunteered to redeliver the cargo at his own expense after the harsh weather conditions had passed. When the cargo arrived, local resident Portnyagin Vasily Alexandrovich organized collaboration between the villagers, local government and business community to renovate a run-down carpentry workshop as part of the project. The workshop has since been used to repair some of the broken and abandoned infrastructure in Zhdanikha, and the project has been deemed a success by multiple parties. A year later, as a result of the project, another cultural organization 'My Family' was set up alongside Ogonyor, engaging in similar activities, and run by Portnyagin Vasily Alexandrovich.

== Environment ==
=== Geography ===
In 2020, inhabitants of Zhdanikha were involved in a sociological study carried out by the Russian Academy of Architecture and Construction Sciences that analyzed the feasibility of modern home designs in the Russian Extreme North. The village's uneven elevation along the Kotuy riverbank presents construction difficulties, with the 65-year-old Zhdanikha cemetery, upkept by local volunteers, separated from the main part of the village by a small ravine.

In 2024, the local government organized a river waste clean-up of the Kotuy river - 20 people participated, covering half a kilometre of river and collecting 1.8 cubic metres of waste.

In March 2025, an earthquake struck a nearby region at the valley of the Kotuy river, causing tremors to be felt in the village from the earthquake, but no casualties or property damage.

=== Ecology ===
A 2024 zoology study by zoologists from National Academy of Sciences of Ukraine and University of Silesia in Katowice found that trees and fossils in Zhadinkha had a very low amount of amber and arthropod inclusions respectively, although three native arthropod species (Khatangaphis rohdendorfi, Tajmyraphididae and Nordaphis sukatchevae) were recorded to be present.

Another University of Barcelona study found that Cretaceous fossils buried under Zhdanikha bearing amber were found to be in the Albian stage.

The rare predatory fly genus Scathophaga was also discovered in Zhdanikha according to another 2021 study.

=== Climate ===
The climate is close to arctic, with long winters, polar nights, severe frosts and short summers:

- The average annual temperature is -13 °C (-30 °C winter, 12 °C summer)
- Snow cover lies eight to nine months per year.
- Precipitation is 110-350 mm per year.
- Open-ground agriculture is impossible in the winter.
- The polar night lasts from November 10 to February 1, and the polar day last from May 13 to August 6.

== Notable people ==
- Antonina Suzdalova (unknown birth date) - Dolgan author.
- Ogdo Aksenova (unknown birth date) - first Dolgan poetess.
