= Popigay =

Popigay or Popigai may refer to:

- Popigay (river), Russia
- Popigai impact structure, Russia
- Popigay (rural locality), a settlement in Krasnoyarsk Krai, Russia
