= Ebyakh =

Ebyakh Эбях
- Selo

Other transcription(s)
  - Sakha: Эбээх
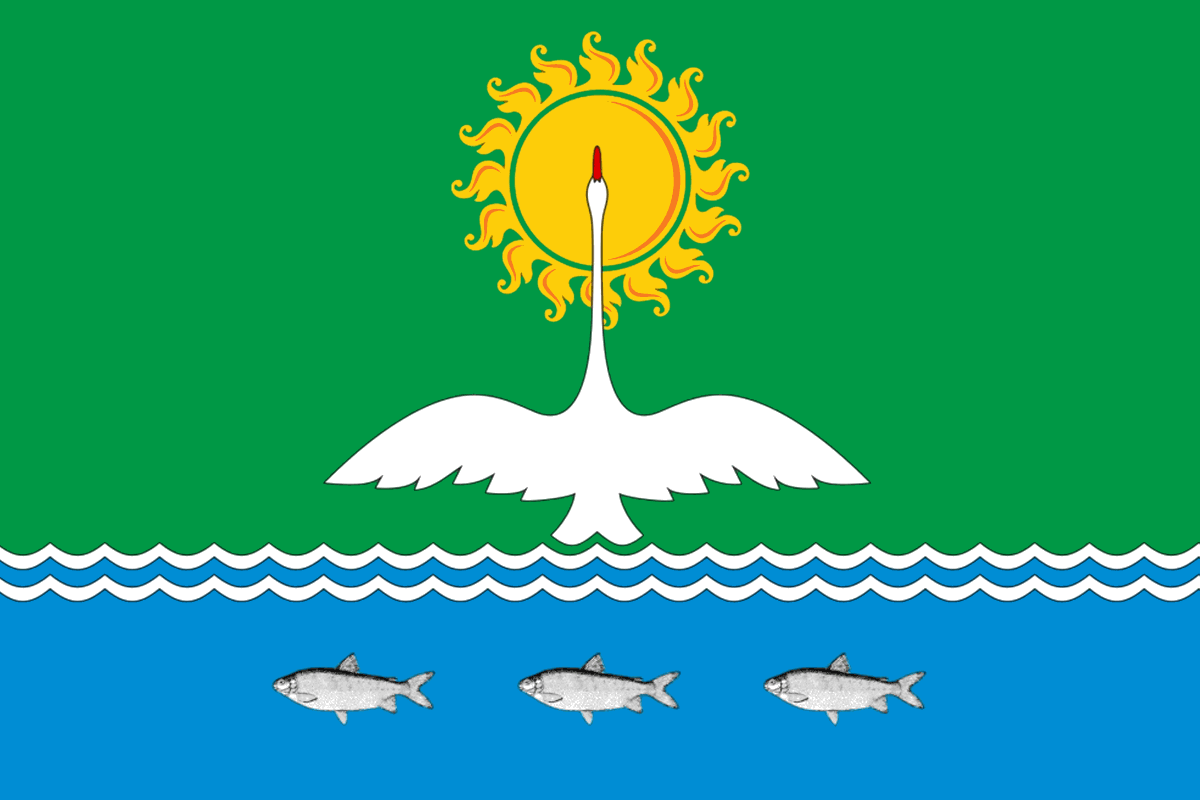
- Flag
- Interactive map of Ebyakh
- Location of Ebyakh Ebyakh (Sakha Republic)
- Coordinates: 68°23′38″N 150°44′54″E
- Country: Russia
- Federal subject: Sakha Republic
- Administrative district: Srednekolymsky District
- Rural okrugSelsoviet: Kangalassky 2-y Rural Okrug
- Founded: 1940

Population (2010 Census)
  - Total: 504
  - Estimate (2021): 453 (−10.1%)

Administrative status
  - Capital of: Kangalassky 2-y Rural Okrug

Municipal status
  - Municipal district: Srednekolymsky Municipal District
  - Rural settlement: Kangalassky 2-y Rural Settlement
  - Capital of: Kangalassky 2-y Rural Settlement
- Time zone: UTC+
- Postal code: 678783
- OKTMO ID: 98646422101

Ebyakh (Russian: Эбях; Yakut: Эбээх, Ebeex) is a rural locality (a selo), the only inhabited locality, and the administrative center of Kangalassky 2-y Rural Okrug of Srednekolymsky District in the Sakha Republic, Russia, located 228 kilometers (142 mi) from Srednekolymsk, the administrative center of the district. Its population as of the 2010 Census was 504, of whom 249 were male and 255 female, the same as was recorded during the 2002 Census.
