= Argakhtakh =

Argakhtakh Аргахтах
- Selo

Other transcription(s)
  - Sakha: Арҕахтаах
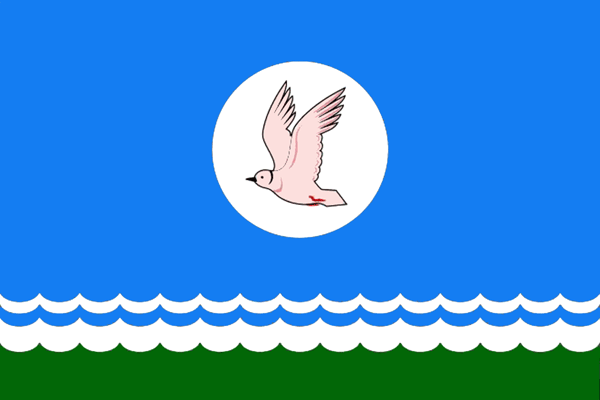
- Flag
- Interactive map of Argakhtakh
- Location of Argakhtakh Argakhtakh (Sakha Republic)
- Coordinates: 68°26′33″N 153°22′40″E
- Country: Russia
- Federal subject: Sakha Republic
- Administrative district: Srednekolymsky District
- Rural okrugSelsoviet: Alazeysky Rural Okrug

Population (2010 Census)
  - Total: 518
  - Estimate (2021): 469 (−9.5%)

Administrative status
  - Capital of: Alazeysky Rural Okrug

Municipal status
  - Municipal district: Srednekolymsky Municipal District
  - Rural settlement: Alazeysky Rural Settlement
  - Capital of: Alazeysky Rural Settlement
- Time zone: UTC+
- Postal code: 678785
- OKTMO ID: 98646405101

Argakhtakh (Russian: Аргахтах; Yakut: Арҕахтаах, Arğaxtaax) is a rural locality (a selo), the only inhabited locality, and the administrative center of Alazeysky Rural Okrug of Srednekolymsky District in the Sakha Republic, Russia, located 140 kilometers (87 mi) from Srednekolymsk, the administrative center of the district. Its population as of the 2010 Census was 518, of whom 247 were male and 271 female, down from 581 recorded during the 2002 Census. It is also known to be extremely cold, reaching temperatures far below zero in both Fahrenheit and Celsius.
