= Syndassko =

Small settlement in Krasnoyarsk Krai in Russia

- Village
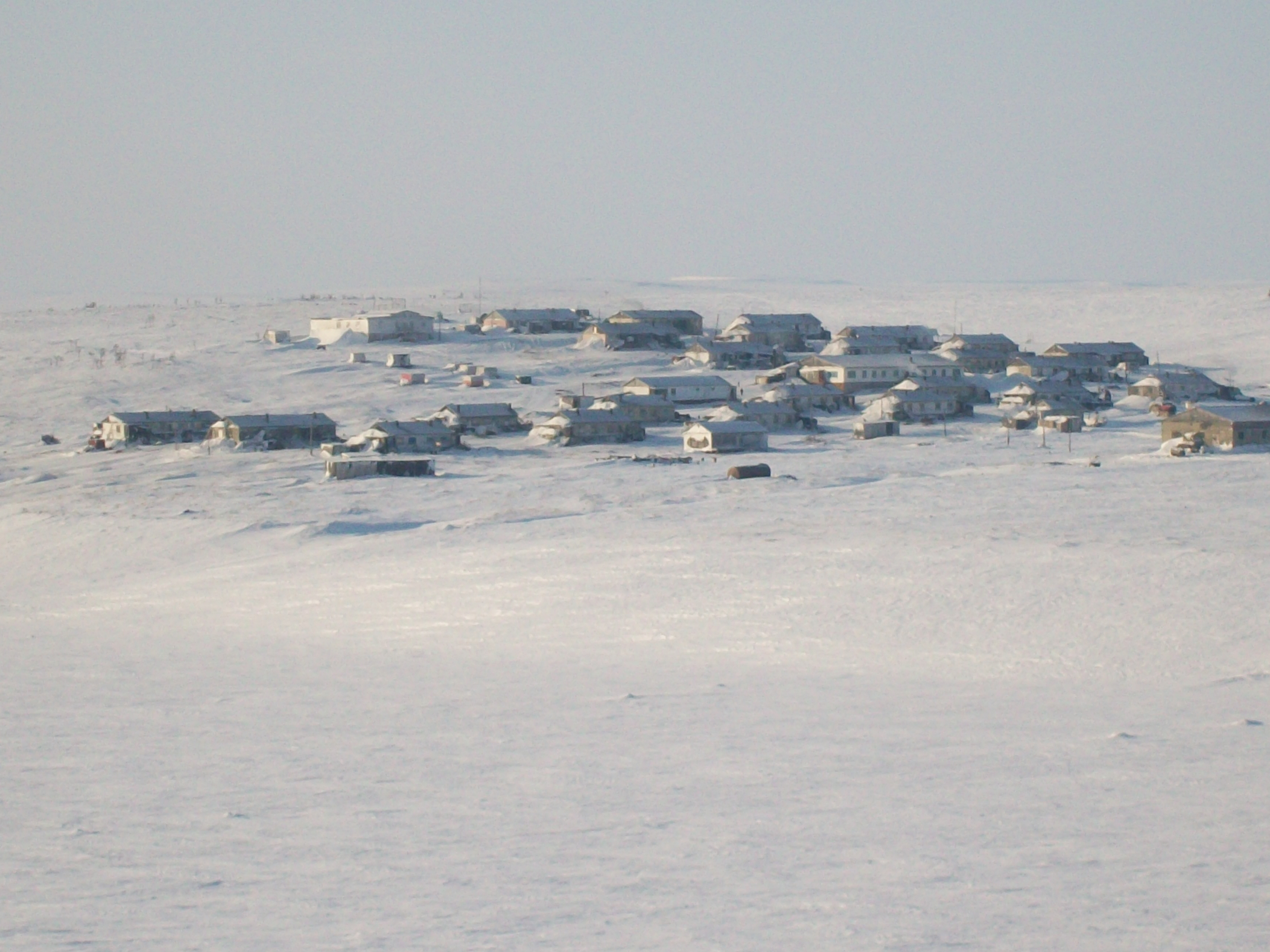
- Syndassko

- Location within Krasnoyarsk Krai Location within Russia Location within Arctic
- Coordinates: 73°15′47″N 108°12′35″E
- Country: Russia
- Krai: Krasnoyarsk
- District: Taymyr Autonomous Okrug
- Rural settlement: Khatanga
- Rural settlement district: Syndassko

Population (2022)
  - Total: 506
- Time zone: UTC+7 (KRAT)
- Postal code: 647472

Syndassko (Russian: Сындасско) is a small settlement in Taymyrsky Dolgano-Nenetsky District, Krasnoyarsk Krai in Russia with a population of 553 inhabitants. It was also known as Popigay and Novorybnaya.

== Climate ==
Syndassko has a polar climate (Köppen climate classification ETh).

Winters are extremely cold, but are slightly warmer than more southern places in the Siberian interior because of a light milding effect from the Arctic Ocean. Summer temperatures are much colder than in the nearby Khatanga further in the Siberian interior due its more northernly location and a cooling effect by the Arctic Ocean waters nearby. Because of the cold summer temperatures, Syndassko is north of the tree line.

Precipitation is quite low, but is somewhat heavier in summer, when it falls mostly as rain, than in the rest of the year, when it falls mostly as snow.

Climate data for Syndassko
Month	Jan	Feb	Mar	Apr	May	Jun	Jul	Aug	Sep	Oct	Nov	Dec	Year
Mean daily maximum °C (°F)	−27.2 (−17.0)	−27.6 (−17.7)	−21.1 (−6.0)	−11.4 (11.5)	−3.5 (25.7)	7.0 (44.6)	10.0 (50.0)	8.9 (48.0)	3.1 (37.6)	−8.1 (17.4)	−20.3 (−4.5)	−25.7 (−14.3)	−9.7 (14.6)
Daily mean °C (°F)	−29.8 (−21.6)	−30.2 (−22.4)	−23.6 (−10.5)	−13.8 (7.2)	−5.1 (22.8)	4.7 (40.5)	7.7 (45.9)	6.9 (44.4)	1.4 (34.5)	−10.1 (13.8)	−23 (−9)	−28.3 (−18.9)	−11.9 (10.6)
Mean daily minimum °C (°F)	−32.2 (−26.0)	−32.7 (−26.9)	−26.8 (−16.2)	−16.9 (1.6)	−7.3 (18.9)	2.3 (36.1)	5.2 (41.4)	4.5 (40.1)	−0.5 (31.1)	−12.2 (10.0)	−25.6 (−14.1)	−30.9 (−23.6)	−14.4 (6.0)
Average precipitation mm (inches)	13 (0.5)	11 (0.4)	13 (0.5)	16 (0.6)	27 (1.1)	40 (1.6)	51 (2.0)	50 (2.0)	36 (1.4)	26 (1.0)	17 (0.7)	14 (0.6)	314 (12.4)
Average precipitation days	3	2	3	3	5	6	6	7	7	6	3	3	54
Average relative humidity (%)	75	71	77	80	84	78	80	79	82	81	79	74	78
Source: Climate-Data.org
