= Soyangi =

Soyangi Соянги Суойуҥу (Sakha)
- Selo
- Interactive map of Soyangi
- Location of Soyangi Soyangi (Sakha Republic)
- Coordinates: 68°52′N 150°18′E
- Country: Russia
- Federal subject: Sakha Republic
- Administrative district: Srednekolymsky District
- Rural okrugSelsoviet: Kangalassky 1-y Rural Okrug

Population (2010 Census)
  - Total: 0
  - Estimate (2021): 0 )

Municipal status
  - Municipal district: Srednekolymsky Municipal District
  - Rural settlement: Kangalassky 1-y Rural Settlement
- Time zone: UTC+
- Postal code: 678790
- OKTMO ID: 98646420106

Soyangi (Russian: Соянги) or Suoyuŋu (Yakut: Суойуҥу) is a rural locality (a selo) in Kangalassky 1-y Rural Okrug of Srednekolymsky District in the Sakha Republic, Russia, located 348 kilometers (216 mi) from Srednekolymsk, the administrative center of the district, and 130 kilometers (81 mi) from Aleko-Kyuyol, the administrative center of the rural okrug. It had no recorded population as of the 2010 Census; unchanged from the 2002 Census.
