= Novorybnaya =

Village in Siberia

Novorybnaya Новорыбная
- Village
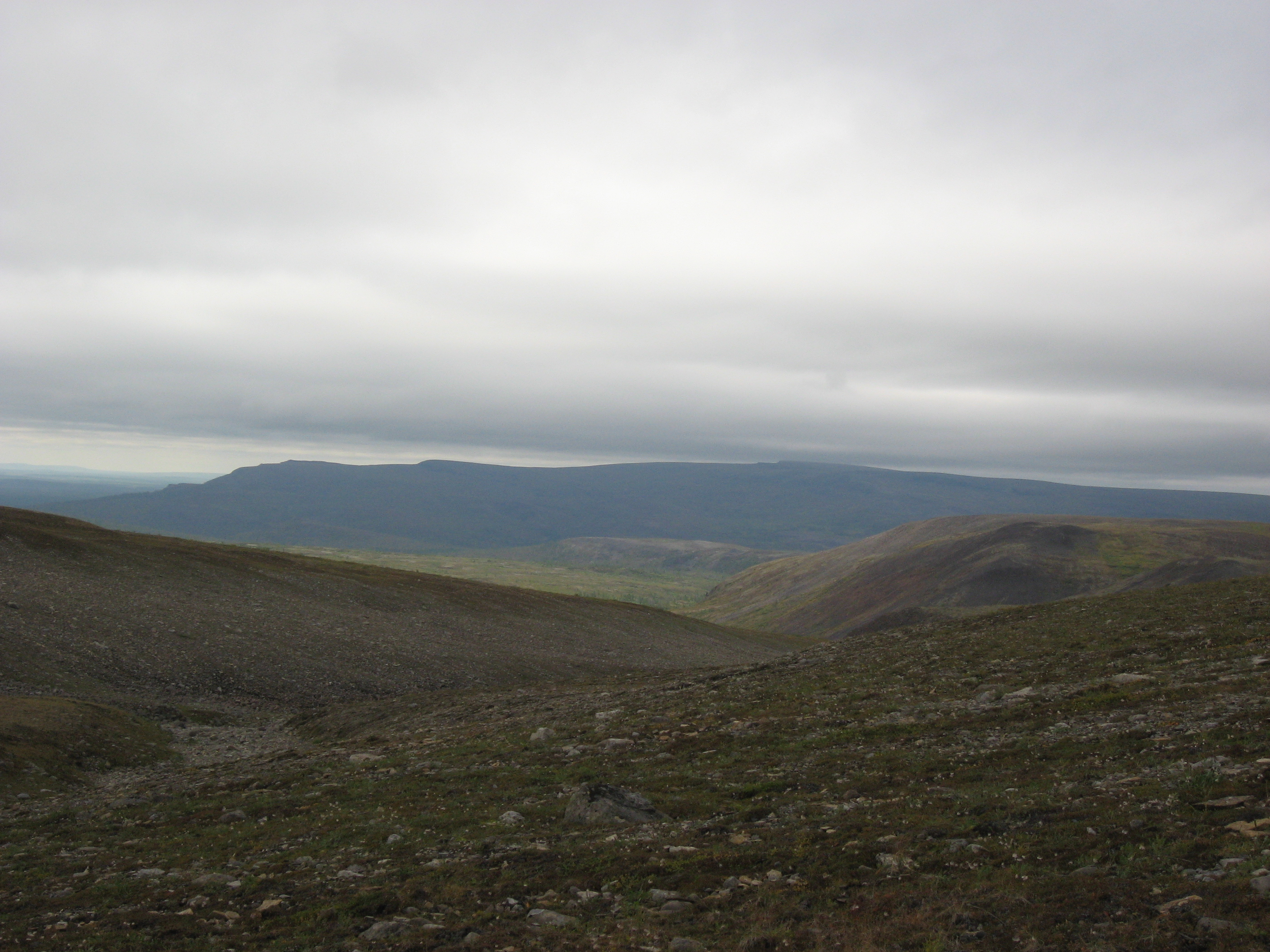
- A landscape near Novorybnaya
- Motto: "The place of long livers"
- Location within Krasnoyarsk Krai Location within Russia Location within Arctic
- Coordinates: 72°50′15″N 105°50′32″E
- Country: Russia
- Krai: Krasnoyarsk
- District: Taymyr Autonomous Okrug
- Rural settlement: Khatanga
- Rural settlement district: Novorybnaya

Population (2022)
  - Total: 543
- Time zone: UTC+7 (KRAT)
- Postal code: 647471

Novorybnaya (Russian: Новорыбная) is a village and former camp in the administrative and municipal district of Taymyrsky Dolgano-Nenetsky District, established as a city on January 23, 1931. The current population is 627, the highest of the three villages in the northern reindeer settlement of Khatanga. Electricity is provided by a diesel power plant. Internet was established here on April 26, 2021.

== Geography ==
The city is located on the Taymyr peninsula and near the mouth of the Khatanga River, in what was once an okrug but is now a district. It is in the far arctic north of Krasnoyarsk Krai, where indigenous people, such as Nenets, live in the northern taiga, tree line, and tundra eco-regions. The scenery is open tundra, as far as the eye can see.

== Demographics ==
This city is mainly the following three ethnicities: partly Dolgan, partly Nganasan, and partly Russian. Some representatives of other nationalities also exist.

== Education ==
There are schools in Novorybnaya: a kindergarten and a secondary (high) school. Kids play sports (football), outside for most of the year, even in the severe winter cold that characterizes the area.

Events are held at the schools, such as competitions, theme nights, and activities.

== Traditions ==
Nomadic people travel to the village to see family, or by necessity, to get food or medicine. Reindeer herding is a tradition of Nenet people, and even features a holiday in the area: "Day of Reindeer".

There is a church in Khatanga, near Novorybnaya: Svyto-Bogoyavlenskiy, the northernmost Orthodox fane in the world. This church was built in 1705.

The city of Khatanga is a major business, cultural and scientific center for East Taimyr and for Russia as a whole. Novorybnaya specifically is populated by artisans; people make ivory carvings, embroideries and clothes. They also exhibit literary talents.

Agriculture is practiced in Novorybnaya and the area around it, even when the cold northern climate is taken into account. Some of the people of this area also work as fishers.

== Notable people ==
According to the people of the village, Anna Petrovna was born during a time when birth records were not kept meticulously in the far north (northern Canada, Greenland, most of Siberia, islands in the Arctic Ocean) and is well over a century old, even though her age-listed as around 100.

== See also ==
- Russia
- Taymyrsky Dolgano-Nenetsky District
- Siberia
- Nenets
- Taymyr Peninsula
- Khatanga, another northern reindeer village in the district
