= Svatay =

Svatay Сватай Сыбаатай (Sakha)
- Selo
- Interactive map of Svatay
- Location of Svatay Svatay (Sakha Republic)
- Coordinates: 68°03′28″N 151°48′14″E
- Country: Russia
- Federal subject: Sakha Republic
- Administrative district: Srednekolymsky District
- Rural okrugSelsoviet: Myatissky 2-y Rural Okrug
- Elevation: 35 m (115 ft)

Population (2010 Census)
  - Total: 578
  - Estimate (2021): 502 (−13.1%)

Administrative status
  - Capital of: Myatissky 2-y Rural Okrug

Municipal status
  - Municipal district: Srednekolymsky Municipal District
  - Rural settlement: Myatissky 2-y Rural Settlement
  - Capital of: Myatissky 2-y Rural Settlement
- Time zone: UTC+
- Postal code: 678781
- OKTMO ID: 98646436101

Svatay (Russian: Сватай; Yakut: Сыбаатай, Sıbaatay) is a rural locality (a selo), the administrative center of, and one of two settlements in addition to Suchchino in Myatissky 2-y Rural Okrug of Srednekolymsky District in the Sakha Republic, Russia, located 146 kilometers (91 mi) from Srednekolymsk, the administrative center of the district. Its population as of the 2010 Census was 578; down from 615 recorded during the 2002 Census.
