= Berezovka, Srednekolymsky District, Sakha Republic =

Berezovka Березовка Березовка (Yakut)
- Selo
- Interactive map of Berezovka
- Location of Berezovka Berezovka (Sakha Republic)
- Coordinates: 67°08′N 156°36′E
- Country: Russia
- Federal subject: Sakha Republic
- Administrative district: Srednekolymsky District
- Rural okrugSelsoviet: Berezovsky Rural Okrug
- Elevation: 52 m (171 ft)

Population (2010 Census)
  - Total: 330
  - Estimate (2021): 280 (−15.2%)

Administrative status
  - Capital of: Berezovsky Rural Okrug

Municipal status
  - Municipal district: Srednekolymsky Municipal District
  - Rural settlement: Berezovsky Rural Settlement
  - Capital of: Berezovsky Rural Settlement
- Time zone: UTC+
- Postal code: 678789
- OKTMO ID: 98646415101

Berezovka (Russian: Березовка; Yakut: Березовка) is a rural locality (a selo) and the administrative center of Berezovsky Rural Okrug in Srednekolymsky District of the Sakha Republic, Russia, located 185 kilometers (115 mi) from Srednekolymsk, the administrative center of the district. Its population as of the 2010 Census was 330; up from 316 recorded in the 2002 Census.
