= Khatanga Airport =

Airport in Russia

Khatanga
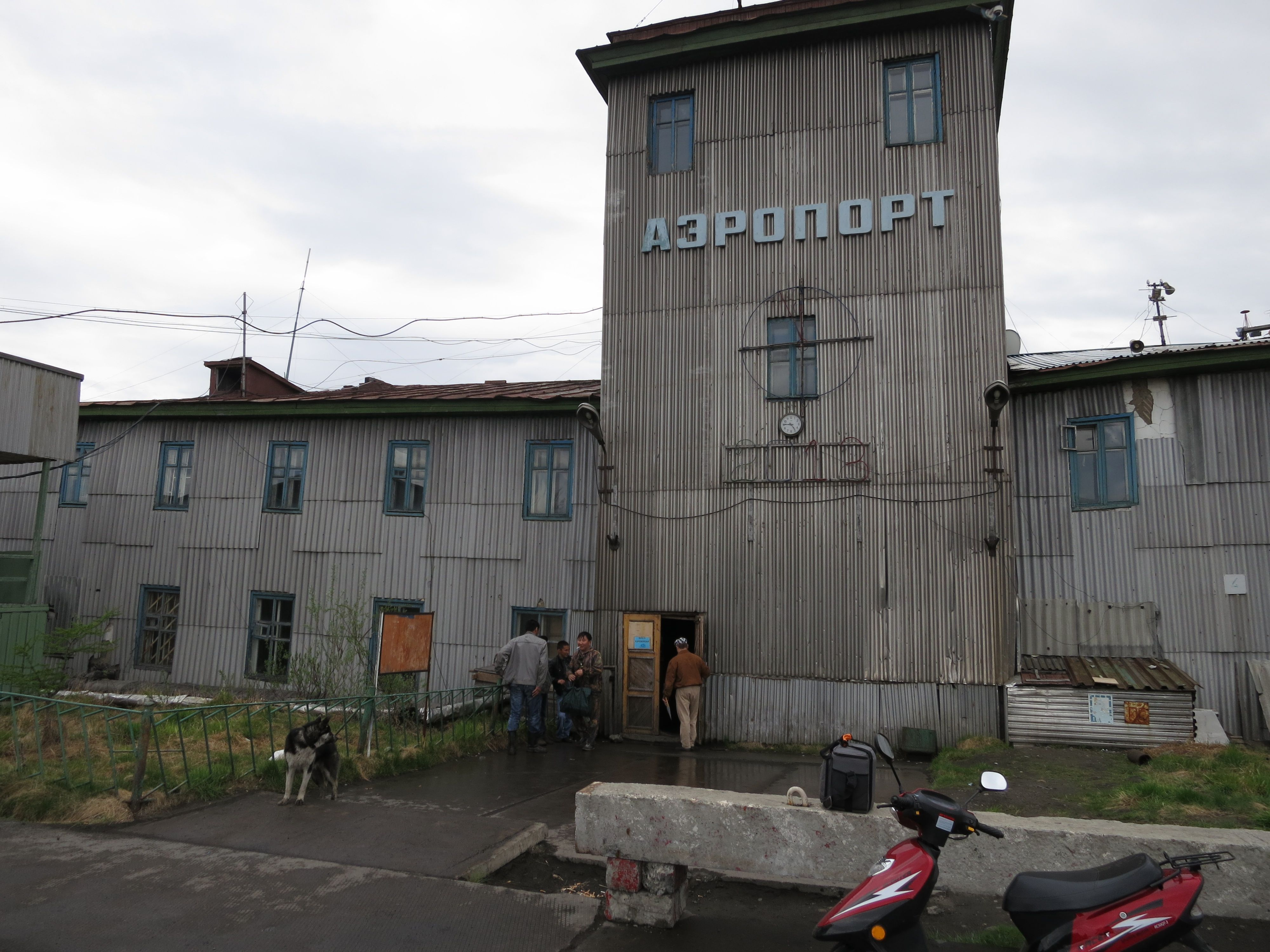
- IATA: HTG; ICAO: UOHH

Summary
- Airport type: Public
- Location: Khatanga (village)
- Elevation AMSL: 98 ft / 30 m
- Coordinates: 71°58′6″N 102°29′12″E
- Interactive map of Khatanga

Runways
| Direction | Length | | Surface |
| Direction | ft | m | Surface |
|---|---|---|---|
| 06/24 | 8,953 | 2,729 | Concrete |

Khatanga Airport (IATA: HTG, ICAO: UOHH) is an airport in Krasnoyarsk Krai, Russia located 1 kilometre (0.62 mi) southeast of Khatanga. It is a major airfield servicing medium-sized airliners. Interceptor aircraft were based here in the 1970s, and the airfield may have been home to deployments from Bratsk. Today it serves as a hub for North Pole tourist expeditions via Sredny Ostrov; however, the Arctic regions still remain sensitive military zones and Khatanga is the first stop requiring entry permission from Federal Security Service border guards.

One of its uses is as a diversion airport if a twin-engine airliner experiences engine problems while flying over Siberia; however, the airport is only equipped for landings during good weather.

== Airlines and destinations ==
| Airlines | Destinations |
|---|---|
| KrasAvia | Krasnoyarsk–Yemelyanovo |

== See also ==
- List of airports in Russia
