= Srednekolymsky District =

Srednekolymsky District Среднеколымский улус (Russian)
- District

Other transcription(s)
  - Sakha: Орто Халыма улууhа
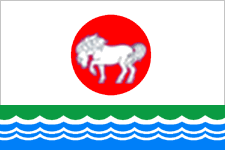
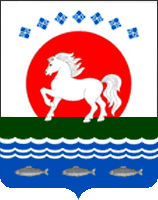
- Flag Coat of arms
- Location of Srednekolymsky District in the Sakha Republic
- Coordinates: 67°27′N 153°42′E
- Country: Russia
- Federal subject: Sakha Republic
- Established: May 25, 1930
- Administrative center: Srednekolymsk

Area
  - Total: 125,200 km^{2} (48,300 sq mi)

Population (2010 Census)
  - Total: 7,897
  - Density: 0.06308/km^{2} (0.1634/sq mi)
  - Urban: 44.6%
  - Rural: 55.4%

Administrative structure
  - Administrative divisions: 1 Towns under district jurisdiction, 9 Rural okrugs
  - Inhabited localities: 1 cities/towns, 14 rural localities

Municipal structure
  - Municipally incorporated as: Srednekolymsky Municipal District
  - Municipal divisions: 1 urban settlements, 9 rural settlements
- Time zone: UTC+11 (MSK+8)
- OKTMO ID: 98646000
- Website: https://mr-srednekolymskij.sakha.gov.ru/

Srednekolymsky District (Russian: Среднеколы́мский улу́с; Yakut: Орто Халыма улууһа, Orto Xalıma uluuha, [oɾto xalɯma uluːha]) is an administrative and municipal district (raion, or ulus), one of the thirty-four in the Sakha Republic, Russia. It is located in the north of the republic and borders with Verkhnekolymsky District in the south, Abyysky District in the west, Allaikhovsky District in the northwest, Nizhnekolymsky District in the north, Bilibinsky District of Chukotka Autonomous Okrug in the east, and with Srednekansky District of Magadan Oblast in the southeast. The area of the district is 125,200 square kilometers (48,300 sq mi). Its administrative center is the town of Srednekolymsk. Population: 7,897 (2010 census); 8,353 (2002 Census); 9,441 (1989 Soviet census). The population of Srednekolymsk accounts for 44.6% of the district's total population.

== Geography ==
The landscape of the district is mostly flat. The main rivers in the district include the Kolyma, the Alazeya and the Rossokha with the Arga-Yuryakh. There are many lakes, the largest of which are Lakes Pavylon and Balyma. Mount Chubukulakh is located in the district.

=== Climate ===
Average January temperature is −38 °C (−36 °F) and average July temperature is +12 °C (54 °F). Annual precipitation ranges from 150–200 millimeters (5.9–7.9 in) in the north to 250–300 millimeters (9.8–11.8 in) in the east.

== History ==
The district was established on May 25, 1930.

== Demographics ==
As of the 2021 Census, the ethnic composition was as follows:

- Yakuts: 79.9%
- Russians: 9.8%
- Evens: 7.8%
- Yukaghirs: 1.0%
- others: 1.5%

== Economy ==
The economy of the district is mostly based on grazing-based animal husbandry, including reindeer, horse and cattle industries. There are deposits of construction materials.

== Inhabited localities ==
Municipal composition
Towns	Population	Male	Female	Inhabited localities in jurisdiction
Srednekolymsk (Среднеколымск)	3528	1668 (47.3%)	1860 (52.7%)	Town of Srednekolymsk (administrative center of the district); selo of Lobuya
Rural settlements	Population	Male	Female	Rural localities in jurisdiction*
Alazeysky Nasleg (Алазейский наслег)	518	247 (47.7%)	271 (52.3%)	**selo of Argakhtakh**
Baydinsky Nasleg (Байдинский наслег)	502	247 (47.7%)	271 (52.3%)	**selo of Nalimsk**
Berezovsky National Nomadic Nasleg (Березовский национальный кочевой наслег)	338	181 (53.6%)	157 (46.4%)	**selo of Berezovka**; selo of Urodan
Kangalassky 1-y Nasleg (Кангаласский 1-й наслег)	557	270 (48.5%)	287 (51.5%)	**selo of Aleko-Kyuyol**; selo of Soyangi
Kangalassky 2-y Nasleg (Кангаласский 2-й наслег)	504	249 (49.4%)	255 (50.6%)	**selo of Ebyakh**
Myatissky 1-y Nasleg (Мятисский 1-й наслег)	522	256 (49.0%)	266 (51.0%)	**selo of Sylgy-Ytar**
Myatissky 2-y Nasleg (Мятисский 2-й наслег)	611	309 (50.6%)	302 (49.4%)	**selo of Svatay**; selo of Suchchino
Sen-Kyuyolsky Nasleg (Сень-Кюёльский наслег)	523	259 (49.5%)	264 (50.5%)	**selo of Oyusardakh**; selo of Roman
Khatyngakhsky Nasleg (Хатынгнахский наслег)	294	139 (47.3%)	155 (52.7%)	**selo of Khatyngakh**

Divisional source:
Population source:
*Administrative centers are shown in bold
