= Lobuya =

Lobuya Лобуя Лобуйа (Sakha)
- Selo
- Interactive map of Lobuya
- Location of Lobuya Lobuya (Sakha Republic)
- Coordinates: 67°29′17″N 154°02′30″E
- Country: Russia
- Federal subject: Sakha Republic
- Administrative district: Srednekolymsky District
- TownSelsoviet: Town of Srednekolymsk

Population (2010 Census)
  - Total: 3
  - Estimate (2021): 1 (−66.7%)

Municipal status
  - Municipal district: Srednekolymsky Municipal District
  - Urban settlement: Srednekolymsk Urban Settlement
- Time zone: UTC+
- Postal code: 678790
- OKTMO ID: 98646101106

Lobuya (Russian: Лобуя; Yakut: Лобуйа) is a rural locality (a selo), and one of two settlements in the Town of Srednekolymsk of Srednekolymsky District in the Sakha Republic, Russia, in addition to Srednekolymsk, the administrative center of the district. It is located 18 kilometers (11 mi) from Srednekolymsk. Its population as of the 2010 Census was 3, of whom all three were male, down from 8 recorded during the 2002 Census.
