= Khatyngnakh =

Khatyngnakh Хатынгнах Хатыҥнаах (Sakha)
- Selo
- Interactive map of Khatyngnakh
- Location of Khatyngnakh Khatyngnakh (Sakha Republic)
- Coordinates: 67°29′39″N 152°36′17″E
- Country: Russia
- Federal subject: Sakha Republic
- Administrative district: Srednekolymsky District
- Rural okrugSelsoviet: Khatyngnakhsky Rural Okrug
- Elevation: 42 m (138 ft)

Population (2010 Census)
  - Total: 294
  - Estimate (2021): 241 (−18%)

Administrative status
  - Capital of: Khatyngnakhsky Rural Okrug

Municipal status
  - Municipal district: Srednekolymsky Municipal District
  - Rural settlement: Khatyngnakhsky Rural Settlement
  - Capital of: Khatyngnakhsky Rural Settlement
- Time zone: UTC+
- Postal code: 678797
- OKTMO ID: 98646448101

Khatyngnakh (Russian: Хатынгнах; Yakut: Хатыҥнаах, Xatıŋnaax) is a rural locality (a selo), the only inhabited locality, and the administrative center of Khatyngnakhsky Rural Okrug of Srednekolymsky District in the Sakha Republic, Russia, located 64 kilometers (40 mi) from Srednekolymsk, the administrative center of the district. Its population as of the 2010 Census was 294, down from 310 recorded during the 2002 Census.
