= Barneo =

Private Russian annual North Pole base established since 2002

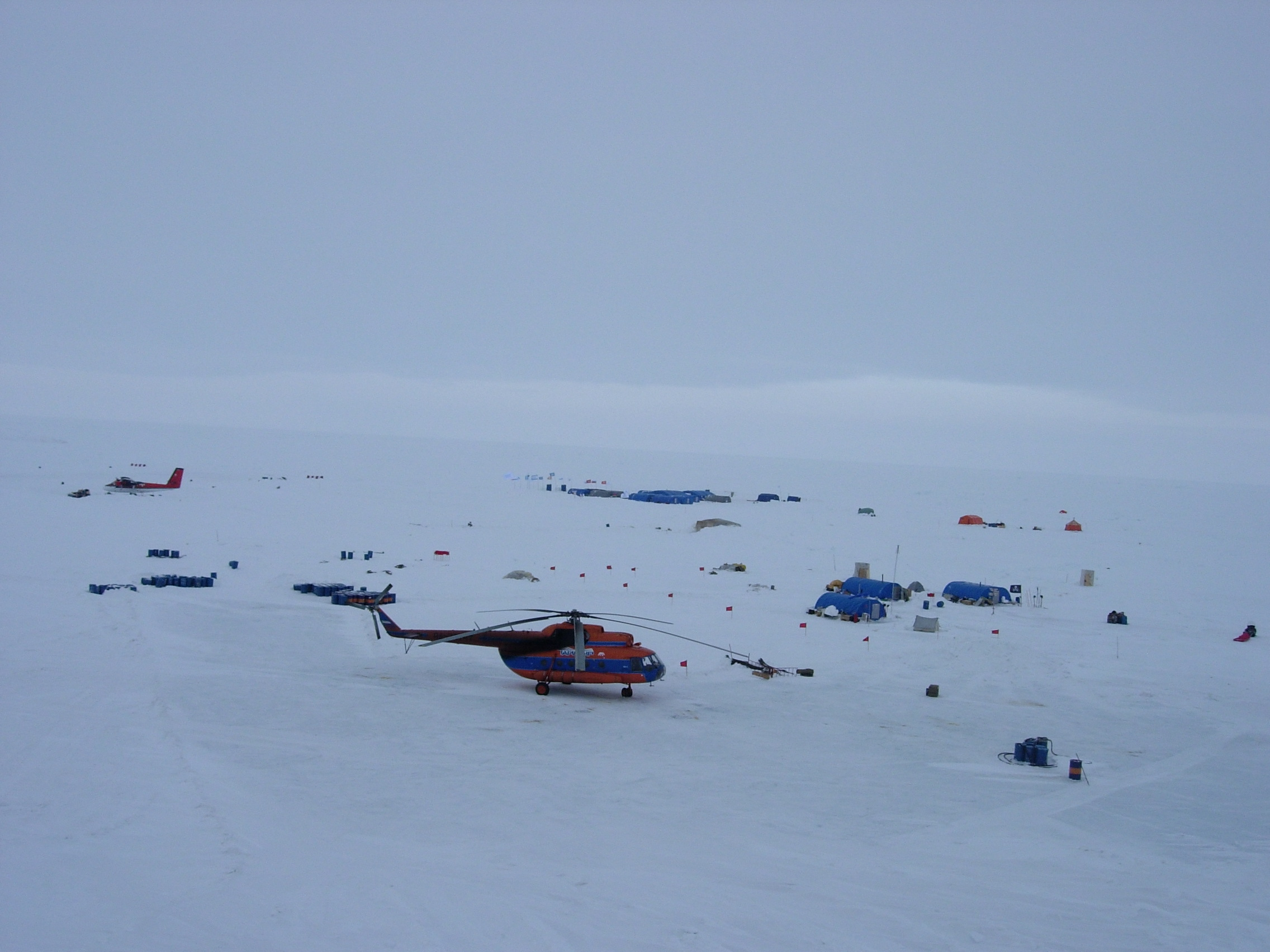
Barneo Ice Camp

Camp Barneo (Russian: Лагерь Бaрнео) is a private temporary tourist resort located on Arctic Ocean ice near the North Pole. When it is occupied for a few weeks in April, it is the northernmost inhabited place in the world. It was first established in 2002 and re-occupied annually thereafter, but it has remained vacant since 2018.

When operating, the price for a visit starts at about $20,000. It is owned by the Swedish pharmaceutical billionaire Frederik Paulsen, heir to the Ferring Pharmaceuticals fortune.

== History ==
The first Ice Camp Barneo near the North Pole was established in 2002. Since that time, the camp has been rebuilt from scratch every year because of the constantly drifting Arctic ice. For example, in 2007 Ice Camp Barneo was located at about 89°31.5′N 30°27′W (about 30 miles / 48 kilometers from the North Pole). However, northerly winds caused the Ice Camp to drift towards the southeast at a speed of 0.8 kilometres per hour (0.5 mph). The ice camp works under the patronage of the Russian Geographical Society and normally lasts for the month of April.

The camp was founded by Russian Alexander Orlov. After his death, his wife Irina Orlova took over until selling the camp to Swedish billionaire Frederik Paulsen.

Ice Camp Barneo should not be confused with the sequential Soviet/Russian "North Pole" drifting ice stations established by the Russian Academy of Sciences Arctic and Antarctic Research Institute (AARI).

From 2002 to 2017, the starting and final point of all expeditions to Barneo was Longyearbyen, the capital of the Svalbard archipelago of Norway. The town has necessary facilities including an airport, hotels of different levels, restaurants, a post office, a bank, and a supermarket.

In 2016, following military exercises by Chechen paratroopers on Barneo, Norway enacted a flight embargo, which it later lifted. As a result, the 2017 event was expected to take place with a base in Russia. However, in March 2017 an expedition tour operator was taking bookings for 2017 and 2018 with flights operating out of Longyearbyen.

In 2019, a political dispute between Russia and Ukraine prevented tourists from flying to the camp. The 2020 and 2021 seasons were canceled as a result of the COVID-19 pandemic. Plans to reopen in 2022 were canceled after the Russian invasion of Ukraine. After another cancellation for 2023, plans were announced to reopen in 2024, controversially departing from Russia rather than Longyearbyen. But like all other years since 2018, the 2024 season was also canceled.

=== Notable visitors ===
- Dixie Dansercoer, polar explorer
- Albert II, Prince of Monaco
- Miki Ando, figure skater
- Eric Philips, polar explorer
- Ramón Hernando de Larramendi, polar explorer

== See also ==
- List of northernmost settlements
