= Suchchino =

Suchchino Суччино Суччун (Sakha)
- Selo
- Interactive map of Suchchino
- Location of Suchchino Suchchino (Sakha Republic)
- Coordinates: 68°15′N 152°23′E
- Country: Russia
- Federal subject: Sakha Republic
- Administrative district: Srednekolymsky District
- Rural okrugSelsoviet: Myatissky 2-y Rural Okrug

Population (2010 Census)
  - Total: 33
  - Estimate (2021): 10 (−69.7%)

Municipal status
  - Municipal district: Srednekolymsky Municipal District
  - Rural settlement: Myatissky 2-y Rural Settlement
- Time zone: UTC+
- Postal code: 678781
- OKTMO ID: 98646436106

Suchchino (Russian: Суччино; Yakut: Суччун, Suççun) is a rural locality (a selo) in Myatissky 2-y Rural Okrug of Srednekolymsky District in the Sakha Republic, Russia, located 141 kilometers (88 mi) from Srednekolymsk, the administrative center of the district, and 60 kilometers (37 mi) from Svatay, the administrative center of the rural okrug. Its population as of the 2010 Census was 33; down from 57 recorded during the 2002 Census.
