= Sredny Ostrov Airfield =

Sredny Ostrov
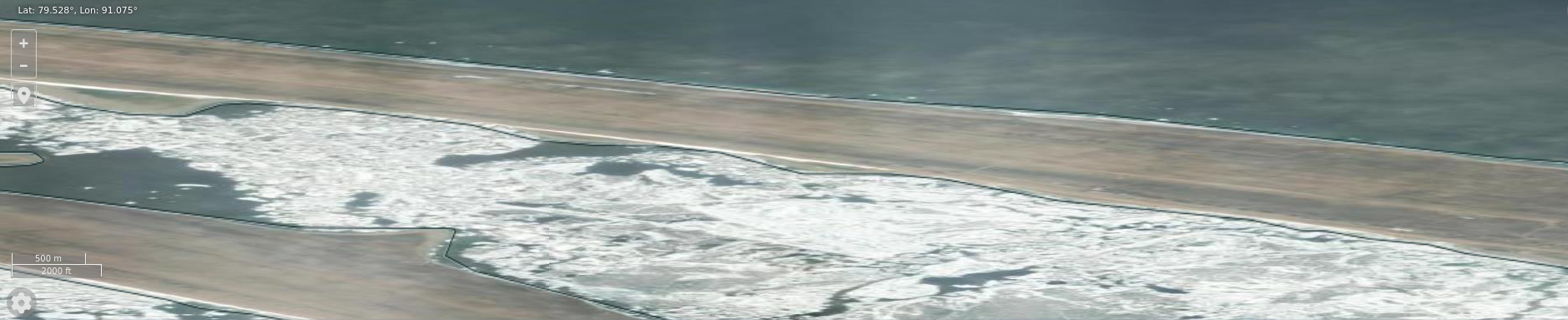
- Satellite imagery of Sredny Ostrov Airfield
- IATA: none; ICAO: UODS

Summary
- Airport type: Military
- Operator: Russian Air Force
- Location: slightly west of Severnaya Zemlya
- Elevation AMSL: 26 ft / 8 m
- Coordinates: 79°31′42″N 91°4′30″E

Map
- Location in Russia

Runways
Direction	Length		Surface
Direction	ft	m	Surface
	9,842	3,000

Sredny Ostrov is a small island ('ostrov') and a military airfield in Krasnoyarsk Krai, Russia, located in the northern Kara Sea, off the archipelago of Severnaya Zemlya and almost 900 km north of Khatanga which in turn is on the Siberian coast. Sredny is an ice airfield used as an alternate field for Tupolev Tu-95 ("Bear") bombers in the Arctic. It was built in the late 1950s as a staging base for Soviet Long Range Aviation bombers to reach the United States, and was maintained by OGA (Arctic Control Group), which was a caretaker agency for strategic facilities in the Arctic. In March 1979 2 Tu-128 (Fiddler) aircraft were based here. The airfield is believed to be operational, operated by Frontier Guards (FSB) and capable of servicing An-26 and An-72 aircraft (it was in use as of January 2000, when an expedition bound for the North Pole recorded being flown there from Khatanga).

== See also ==
- List of military airbases in Russia
