= Oyusardakh =

Oyusardakh Ойусардах Ойууһардаах (Sakha)
- Selo
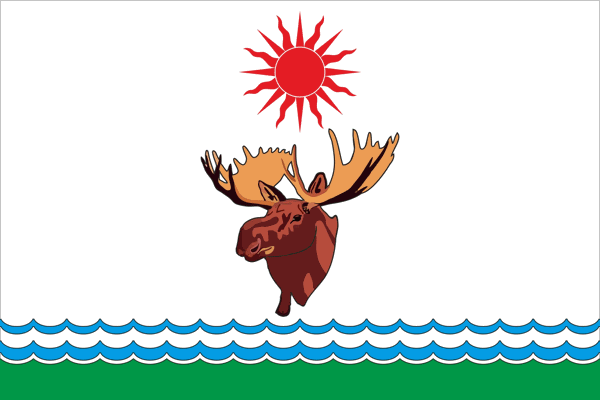
- Flag
- Interactive map of Oyusardakh
- Location of Oyusardakh Oyusardakh (Sakha Republic)
- Coordinates: 68°17′N 154°42′E
- Country: Russia
- Federal subject: Sakha Republic
- Administrative district: Srednekolymsky District
- Rural okrugSelsoviet: Sen-Kyuyolsky Rural Okrug
- Elevation: 37 m (121 ft)

Population (2010 Census)
  - Total: 523
  - Estimate (2021): 530 (+1.3%)

Administrative status
  - Capital of: Sen-Kyuyolsky Rural Okrug

Municipal status
  - Municipal district: Srednekolymsky Municipal District
  - Rural settlement: Sen-Kyuyolsky Rural Settlement
  - Capital of: Sen-Kyuyolsky Rural Settlement
- Time zone: UTC+
- Postal code: 678786
- OKTMO ID: 98646442101

Oyusardakh (Russian: Ойусардах; Yakut: Ойууһардаах, Oyuuhardaax) is a rural locality (a selo) and the administrative center of Sen-Kyuyolsky Rural Okrug of Srednekolymsky District in the Sakha Republic, Russia, located 169 kilometers (105 mi) from Srednekolymsk, the administrative center of the district. Its population as of the 2010 Census was 523; down from 551 recorded during the 2002 Census.
