= Popigay (rural locality) =

Popigay Попигай
- Rural locality
- Interactive map of Popigay
- Location of Popigay Popigay (Krasnoyarsk Krai)
- Coordinates: 71°52′N 110°45′E
- Country: Russia
- Federal subject: Krasnoyarsk Krai
- Administrative district: Taymyrsky Dolgano-Nenetsky District

Population (2010 Census)
  - Total: 334
  - Estimate (2021): 330 (−1.2%)
- Time zone: UTC+7 (MSK+4)
- Postal code: 647474
- OKTMO ID: 04653419136

Popigay (Russian: Попига́й) is a rural locality (a settlement) in Taymyrsky Dolgano-Nenetsky District of Krasnoyarsk Krai, Russia. It is known for the Popigay River and Popigay crater. Population: 334 (2010 census); 358 (2002 census);
