= Khatanga, Russia =

Khatanga Хатанга
- Selo
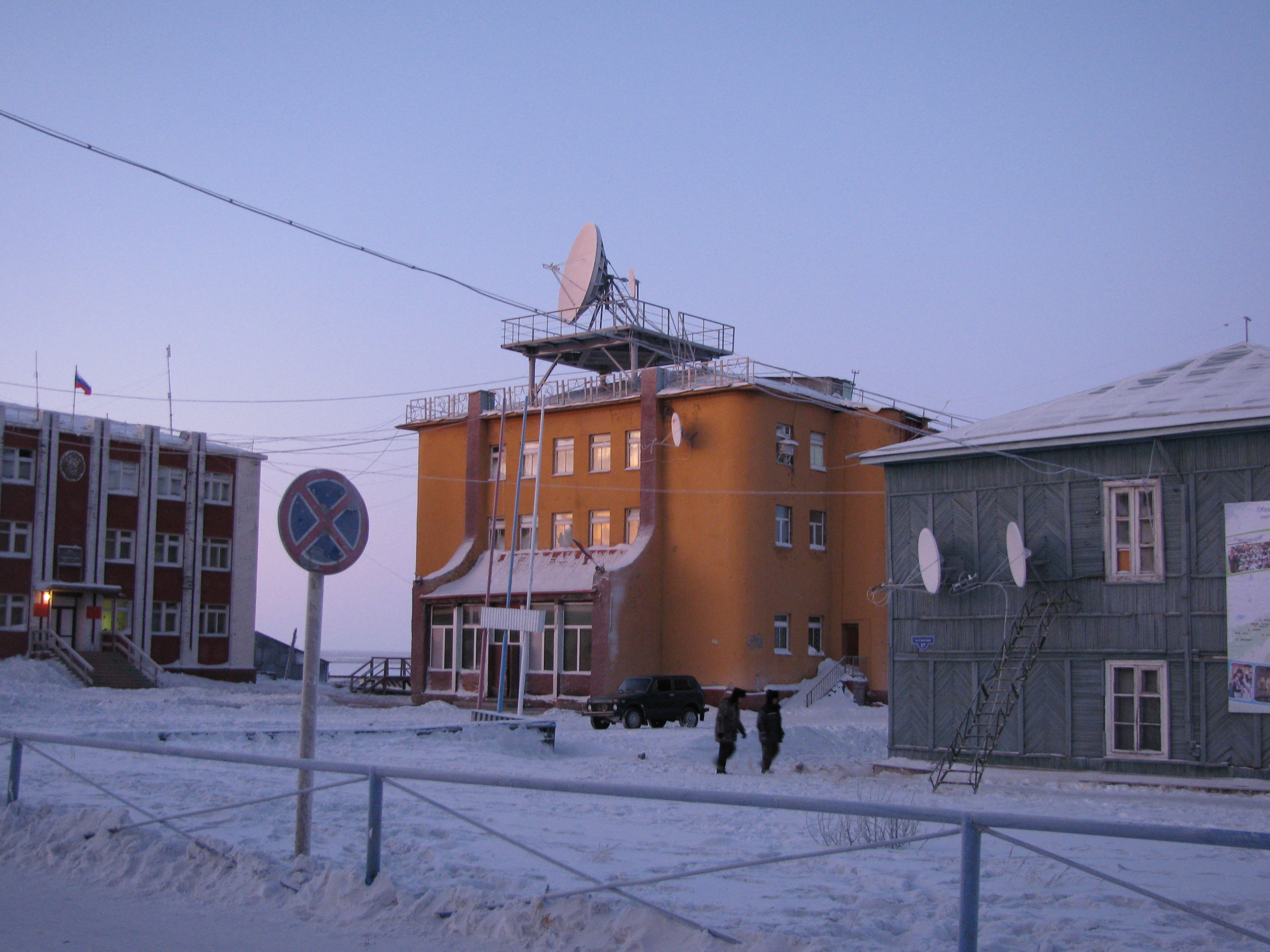
- Khatanga Post Office

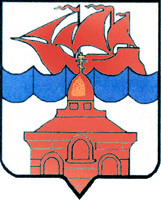
- Coat of arms
- Interactive map of Khatanga
- Location of Khatanga Khatanga (Krasnoyarsk Krai)
- Coordinates: 71°58′47″N 102°28′22″E
- Country: Russia
- Federal subject: Krasnoyarsk Krai
- Administrative district: Taymyrsky Dolgano-Nenetsky District

Population
  - Estimate (2002): 3,450 )

Municipal status
  - Municipal district: Taymyrsky Dolgano-Nenetsky Municipal District
  - Rural settlement: Khatanga Rural Settlement
  - Capital of: Khatanga Rural Settlement
- Time zone: UTC+7 (MSK+4)
- Postal codes: 647460, 647462
- OKTMO ID: 04653419101

Khatanga (Russian: Ха́танга) is a rural locality (a selo) in Taymyrsky Dolgano-Nenetsky District of Krasnoyarsk Krai, Russia, located on the Khatanga River on the Taymyr Peninsula. It is one of the northernmost inhabited localities in Russia. Its elevation is 30 metres (98 ft) above sea level. As of the 2002 Census, its population was 3,450.

The name Khatanga means "large water" in the local Evenki language. The locality is known to have existed since the 17th century. It is served by the Khatanga Airport.

Khatanga is relatively close to the Popigai impact structure, an asteroid impact structure and geological formation located in northern Siberia. The crater has been noted since September 2012 as a potential source of a significant new global supply of industrial diamonds.

== Economy ==
=== Tourism ===
Khatanga is sometimes visited by Western sightseers touring the surrounding natural wilderness in Siberia. It has a hotel, a natural history museum, and weather reporting stations.

In 2019, mayor Yevgeny Vershinin announced plans to develop the locality to act as a hub for travelers on their way to the North Pole, hoping to compete with Longyearbyen, a Norwegian town on the island of Svalbard, for Arctic tourists. The locality has been used as a pit stop for northern expeditions in the past, with helicopters coming from Krasnoyarsk occasionally stopping there on their way to the North Pole.

The Khatanga airport is one of the largest and most operable in the Russian Arctic, with the main runway receiving renovations in 2009. However, the rest of the airport, especially the terminal, was found to be in extremely poor condition in 2019.

=== Port ===
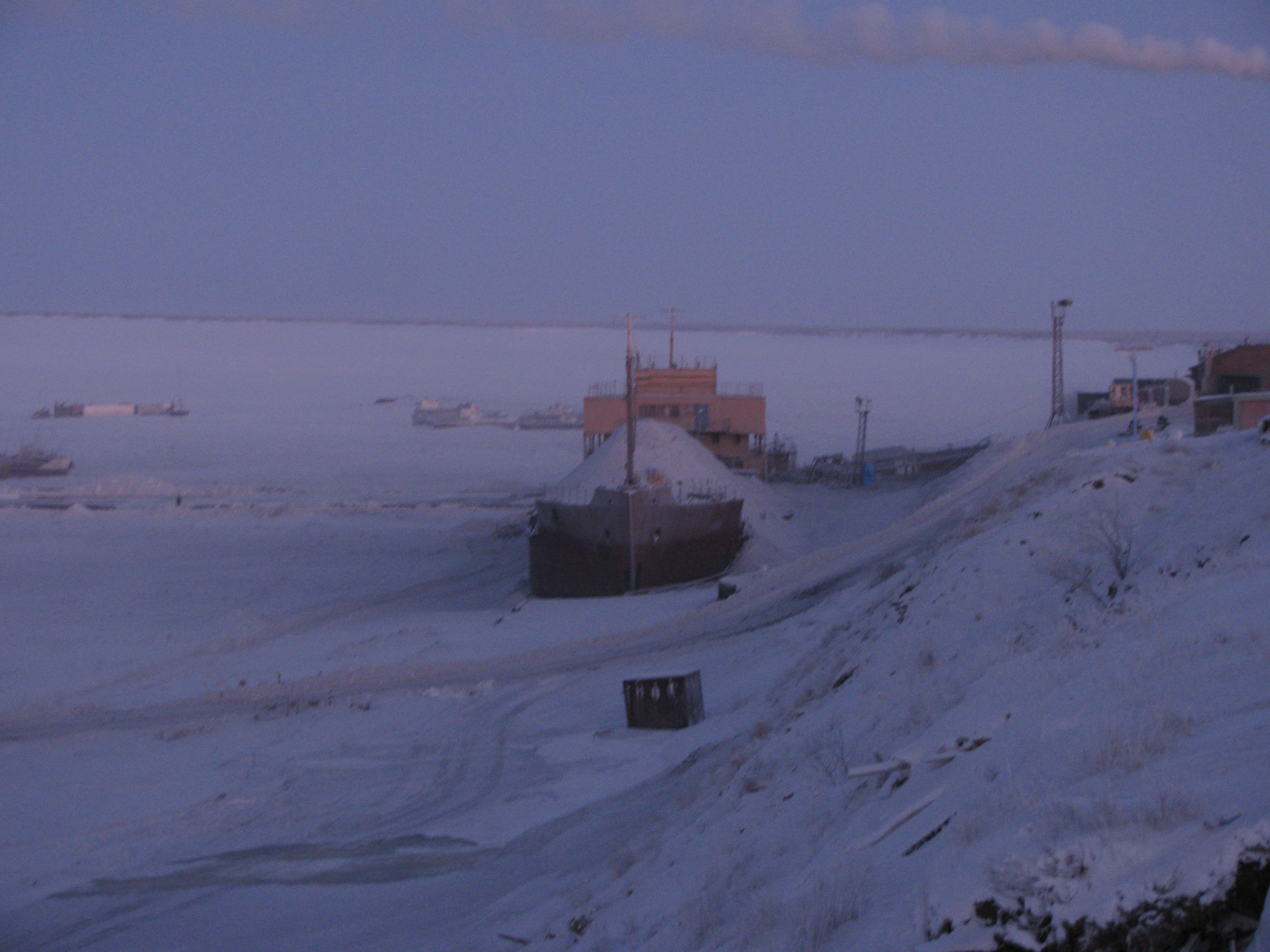
Port of Khatanga

The locality is home to the ZAO Sea Commercial Port of Khatanga which accepts various Arctic cargo shipments. While the port only operates from June until September, it has five mooring berths capable of admitting vessels with draughts up to 4.6 metres (15 ft). Two of the berths service the port fleet, two receive general cargo, and one is reserved for oil products. Goods such as refrigerated cargo, timber, and bulk shipments of coal, sand, gravel, and oil are processed at the port.

== Climate ==
Khatanga has a subarctic climate (Köppen climate classification Dfc).

Winters in Khatanga are bitterly cold, although not as extremely frosty as more southern inner Siberia, due to the slight moderating influence of the Arctic Ocean.

Summer temperatures are mild, with an average July temperature of 12.7 °C (54.9 °F). They are also relatively high for its latitude (72 °N), with a record high of 36.7 °C (98 °F) in July. Khatanga is the northernmost town in the world below the treeline, as summers are warm enough for trees to grow. The only tree that can grow there is the Dahurian larch (Larix gmelinii).

Precipitation is quite low, but is somewhat higher in summer (when it falls mostly as rain) than in the rest of the year (when it falls mostly as snow).

Climate data for Khatanga
| Month | Jan | Feb | Mar | Apr | May | Jun | Jul | Aug | Sep | Oct | Nov | Dec | Year |
|---|---|---|---|---|---|---|---|---|---|---|---|---|---|
| Record high °C (°F) | −1.6 (29.1) | −0.3 (31.5) | 3.8 (38.8) | 8.8 (47.8) | 25.4 (77.7) | 33.1 (91.6) | 36.7 (98.1) | 29.9 (85.8) | 24.2 (75.6) | 12.5 (54.5) | 2.3 (36.1) | −0.2 (31.6) | 36.7 (98.1) |
| Mean daily maximum °C (°F) | −27.1 (−16.8) | −27.4 (−17.3) | −19.8 (−3.6) | −9.9 (14.2) | −1.1 (30.0) | 11.6 (52.9) | 17.3 (63.1) | 14.1 (57.4) | 5.4 (41.7) | −7.8 (18.0) | −19.8 (−3.6) | −25.4 (−13.7) | −7.5 (18.5) |
| Daily mean °C (°F) | −30.9 (−23.6) | −31.3 (−24.3) | −24.7 (−12.5) | −15.5 (4.1) | −5.0 (23.0) | 7.2 (45.0) | 12.7 (54.9) | 9.8 (49.6) | 2.4 (36.3) | −10.9 (12.4) | −23.5 (−10.3) | −29.3 (−20.7) | −11.6 (11.2) |
| Mean daily minimum °C (°F) | −34.7 (−30.5) | −34.9 (−30.8) | −29.1 (−20.4) | −20.5 (−4.9) | −8.7 (16.3) | 3.9 (39.0) | 9.0 (48.2) | 6.3 (43.3) | −0.2 (31.6) | −14.1 (6.6) | −27.2 (−17.0) | −32.9 (−27.2) | −15.3 (4.5) |
| Record low °C (°F) | −59 (−74) | −55.9 (−68.6) | −52.4 (−62.3) | −42.9 (−45.2) | −30.9 (−23.6) | −14.3 (6.3) | −0.7 (30.7) | −3.2 (26.2) | −18.6 (−1.5) | −39.9 (−39.8) | −51 (−60) | −58.7 (−73.7) | −59 (−74) |
| Average precipitation mm (inches) | 17 (0.7) | 13 (0.5) | 13 (0.5) | 13 (0.5) | 16 (0.6) | 28 (1.1) | 43 (1.7) | 42 (1.7) | 32 (1.3) | 28 (1.1) | 22 (0.9) | 16 (0.6) | 283 (11.2) |
| Average rainy days | 0.03 | 0 | 0.03 | 1 | 5 | 15 | 17 | 19 | 16 | 3 | 0.1 | 0.1 | 76.26 |
| Average snowy days | 21 | 22 | 20 | 20 | 20 | 9 | 1 | 1 | 14 | 26 | 24 | 22 | 200 |
| Average relative humidity (%) | 77 | 78 | 78 | 78 | 79 | 73 | 70 | 78 | 83 | 84 | 81 | 77 | 78 |
| Mean monthly sunshine hours | 0 | 23 | 151 | 267 | 264 | 262 | 308 | 195 | 88 | 43 | 3 | 0 | 1,604 |
Source 1: weatheronline.co.uk
Source 2: NOAA (sun only, 1961-1990)

== Demographics ==
Historical population
| Year | Pop. | ±% |
|---|---|---|
| 1939 | 1,037 | — |
| 1959 | 1,979 | +90.8% |
| 1970 | 3,833 | +93.7% |
| 1979 | 4,868 | +27.0% |
| 1989 | 6,385 | +31.2% |
| 2002 | 3,450 | −46.0% |
| 2010 | 2,645 | −23.3% |
Source: Census data
