= Taymyrsky Dolgano-Nenetsky District =

Taymyrsky Dolgano-Nenetsky District Таймырский Долгано-Ненецкий район (Russian)
- District
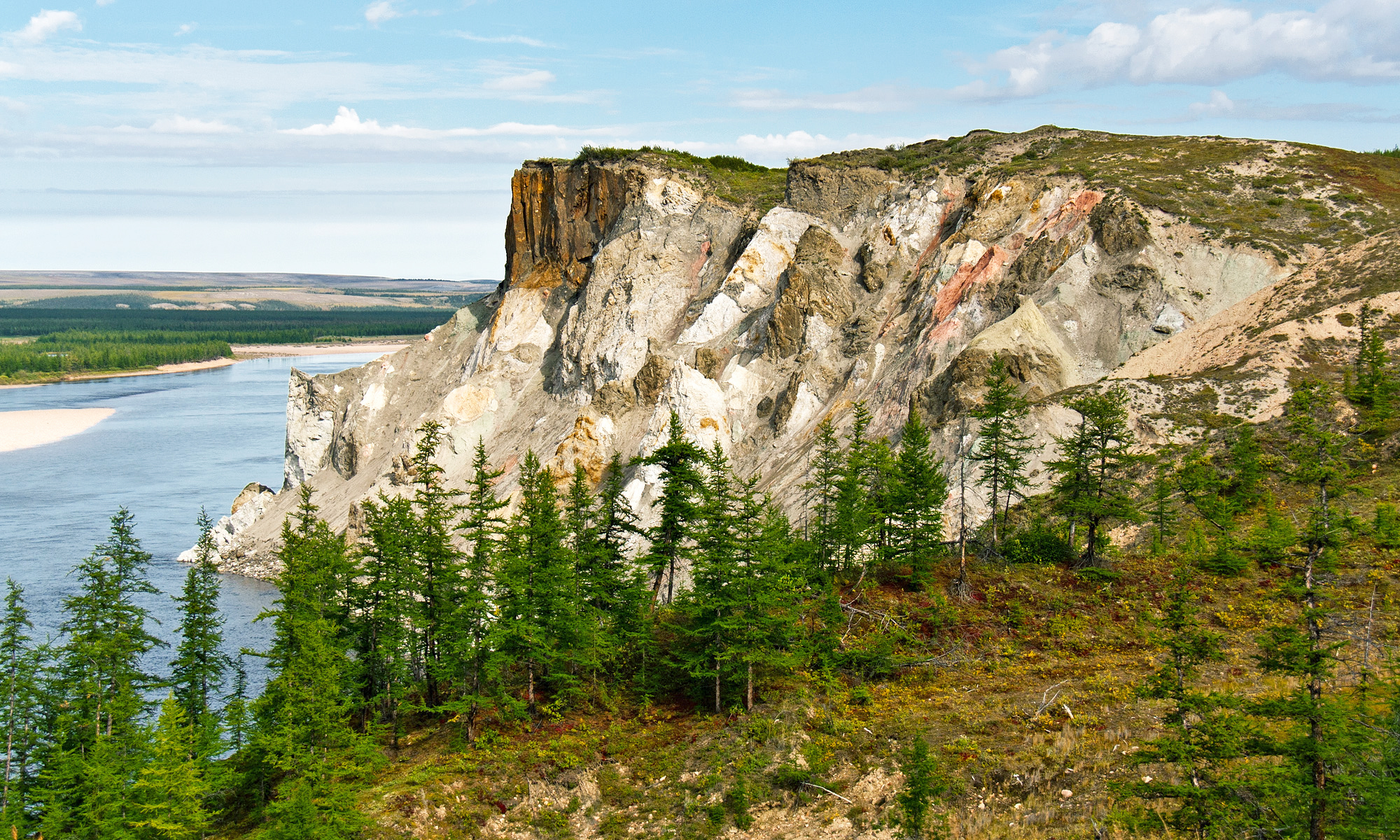
- Geological outcrops "Motley rocks" (Popigai astrobleme)

- Flag Coat of arms

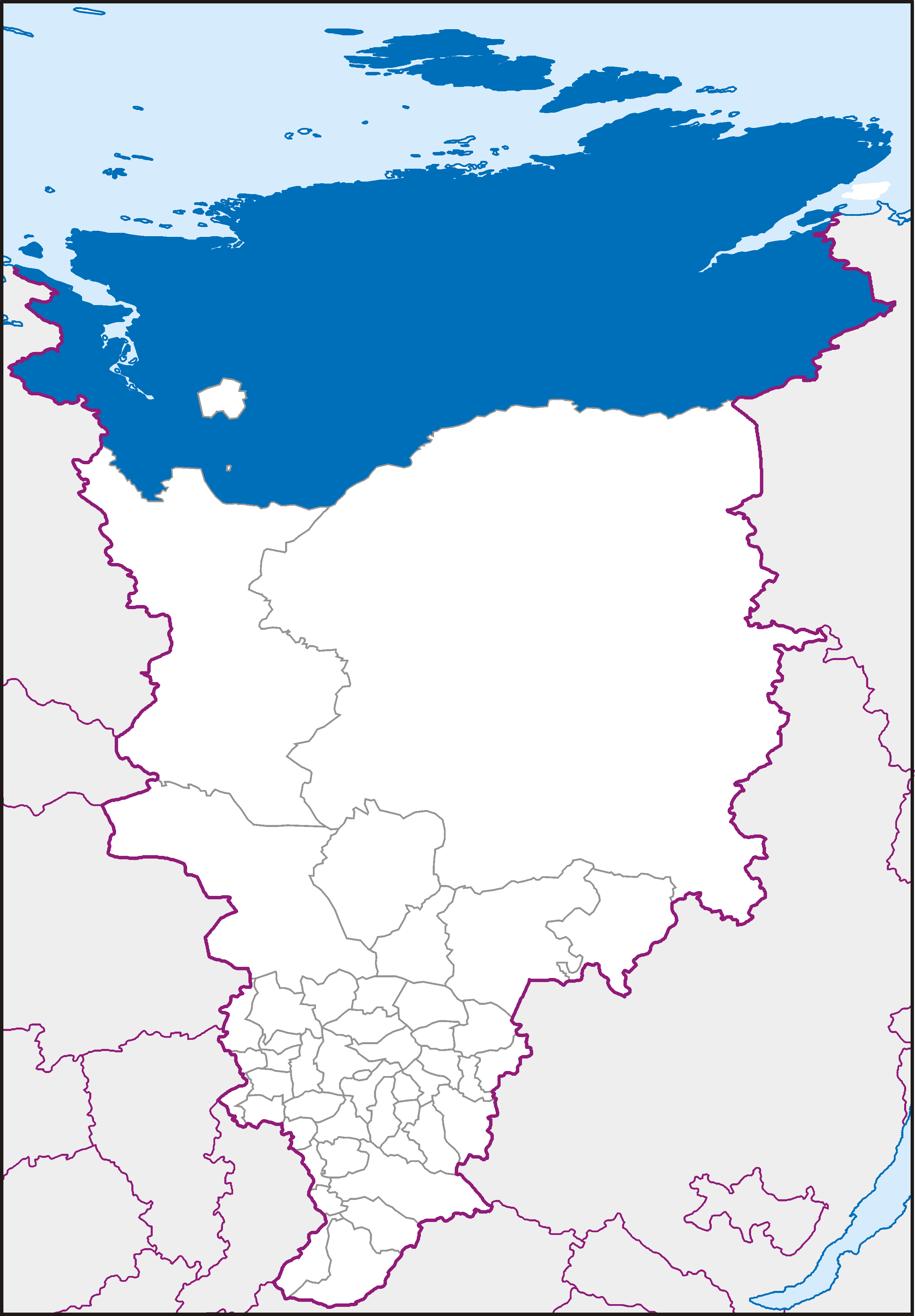
- Location of Taymyrsky Dolgano-Nenetsky District in Krasnoyarsk Krai
- Coordinates: 70°N 100°E
- Country: Russia
- Federal subject: Krasnoyarsk Krai
- Established: April 10, 1930
- Administrative center: Dudinka

Government
  - Type: Local government
  - Body: Duma
  - Head: Sergey V. Baturin

Area
  - Total: 897,900 km^{2} (346,700 sq mi)

Population (2010 Census)
  - Total: 34,432
  - Density: 0.03835/km^{2} (0.09932/sq mi)
  - Urban: 66.4%
  - Rural: 33.6%

Administrative structure
  - Administrative divisions: 1 District towns, 1 Urban-type settlements, 2 Selsoviets
  - Inhabited localities: 1 cities/towns, 1 urban-type settlements, 25 rural localities

Municipal structure
  - Municipally incorporated as: Taymyrsky Dolgano-Nenetsky Municipal District
  - Municipal divisions: 2 urban settlements, 2 rural settlements
- Time zone: UTC+7 (MSK+4)
- OKTMO ID: 04653000
- Website: http://www.taimyr24.ru/

Taymyrsky Dolgano-Nenetsky District (Russian: Таймы́рский Долга́но-Не́нецкий райо́н) is an administrative and municipal district (raion), one of the forty-three in Krasnoyarsk Krai, Russia. It is located in the north of the krai above the Arctic Circle on the Taymyr Peninsula and borders with Laptev and Kara Seas in the north, the Sakha Republic in the east, Evenkiysky and Turukhansky Districts in the south, and with Yamalo-Nenets Autonomous Okrug in the west. The area of the district is 879,900 square kilometers (339,700 sq mi). Its administrative center is the town of Dudinka, which accounts for 64.4% of the district's total population. The 2010 Russian census counted 34,432 people in the whole district, as opposed to 39,786 (2002 Census) in 2002, and 55,111 (1989 Soviet census) in 1989.

Norilsk is an enclave surrounded by, but independent from, Taymyrsky Dolgano-Nenetsky District. In 2005, the central city of Norilsk merged with its satellite cities or neighborhoods (Talnakh and Kayerkan) as a municipal division. Greater Norilsk, or Big Norilsk (Russian: «Большой Норильск» ), is the Norilsk Industrial Region (Russian: Нори́льский промы́шленный райо́н, (НПР)) and is the Krai city. Greater Norilsk includes Norilsk, the remote area (Russian: отдалённый район) of Oganer, and the urban-type settlement of Snezhnogorsk and is equal to a district within the Krasnoyarsk Krai and is not part of the Taymyrsky Dolgano-Nenetsky District.

It is the second largest second-level administrative division in the world, after Qikiqtaaluk in Canada.

== History ==
The district was founded on April 10, 1930. Until January 1, 2007, it existed as Taymyr Autonomous Okrug, a federal subject of Russia.

== Government ==
The Head of the district is Vershinin Evgeny Vladimirovich.

== Administrative divisions ==
The district is divided into 2 urban-type settlements and 2 rural settlements.

Settlement	No. of Settlements	Population	Area (km²)	Density (per km²)
Urban settlement
Dikson	6	319	218,959	0.001
Dudinka	1	20,659	223,455	0.092
Rural settlement
Karaul	10	3,798	101,108	0.037
Khatanga	10	5,378	336,405	0.015

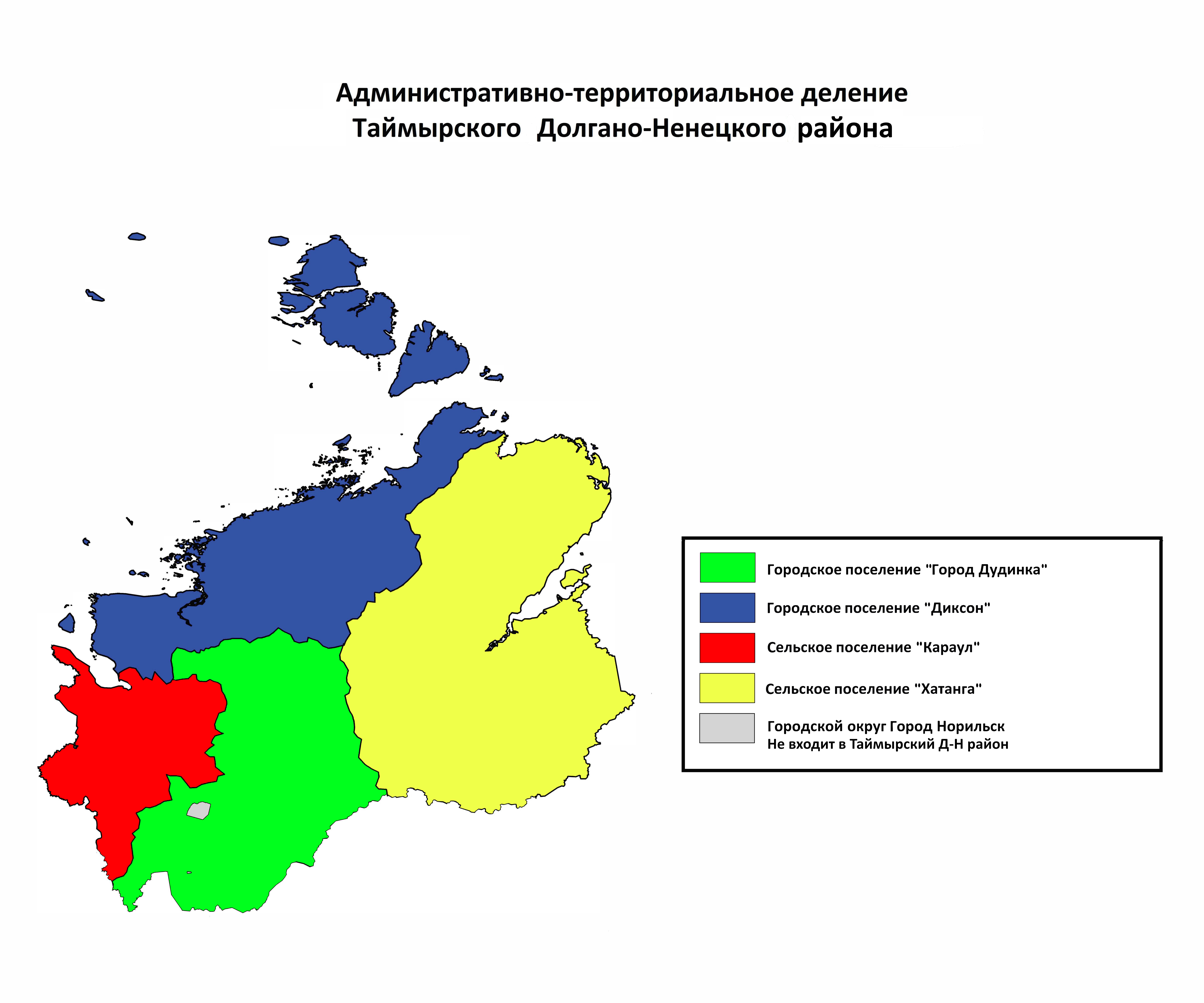

== Demographics ==
=== Vital statistics ===
Source: Russian Federal State Statistics Service

	Average population (x 1000)	Live births	Deaths	Natural change	Crude birth rate (per 1000)	Crude death rate (per 1000)	Natural change (per 1000)
2007	37	592	335	257	16.2	9.2	7.0
2008	36	586	360	226	16.3	10.0	6.3
2009	35	611	387	224	17.3	11.0	6.4
2010	35	602	351	251	17.4	10.1	7.3

=== Ethnic groups ===
Of the 39,786 residents (as of the 2002 census) 1,018 (2.6%) chose not to specify their ethnic background. Above 38.6% of the population identified themselves as indigenous Siberians (Dolgans, Nenets, Nganasans, Evenks, Enets, or others.) 54.2% of the population were ethnic Russians. Other nationalities included 2,423 Ukrainians (6.1%), 587 Volga Germans (1.5%), 425 Volga Tatars (1.1%), 294 Belarusians (0.7%) and 239 Azeris (0.6%)

Ethnic group	1939 Census		1959 Census		1970 Census		1979 Census		1989 Census		2002 Census		2010 Census		2021 Census	
Ethnic group	Number	%	Number	%	Number	%	Number	%	Number	%	Number	%	Number	%	Number	%
Dolgans^{1}	3,971	13.8%	3,934	11.8%	4,344	11.4%	4,338	9.7%	4,939	8.9%	5,517	13.9%	5,393	17.4%	5,485	20.4%
Nenets	2,523	8.8%	1,878	5.6%	2,247	5.9%	2,345	5.2%	2,446	4.4%	3,054	7.7%	3,494	11.3%	3,696	13.7%
Enets^{2}	2,523	8.8%	1,878	5.6%	2,247	5.9%	2,345	5.2%	103	0.2%	197	0.5%	204	0.6%	185	0.6%
Nganasans^{3}	2,523	8.8%	682	2.0%	765	2.0%	746	1.7%	849	1.5%	766	1.9%	747	2.4%	604	2.2%
Evenks	563	2.0%	412	1.2%	413	1.1%	338	0.8%	311	0.6%	305	0.8%	266	0.8%	142	0.5%
Russians	16,931	59.0%	21,799	65.3%	25,465	66.9%	30,640	68.2%	37,438	67.1%	23,348	58.6%	17,232	55.8%	14,546	54.2%
Others	4,723	16.5%	4,677	14.0%	4,826	12.7%	6,546	14.6%	9,717	17.4%	6,629	16.7%	3,462	11.2%	2,107	7.8%
Notes: 1. In the 1939 and 1959 census Dolgans were counted as Yakuts.; 2. In the 1939, 1959, 1970 and 1979 census Enets were counted as Nenets.; 3. In the 1939 census Nganasans were counted as Nenets.

Historical population
Year	Pop.	±%
1939	28,711	—
1959	33,382	+16.3%
1970	38,060	+14.0%
1979	44,108	+15.9%
1989	55,111	+24.9%
2002	39,786	−27.8%
2010	34,432	−13.5%
2021	30,154	−12.4%
Source: Census data

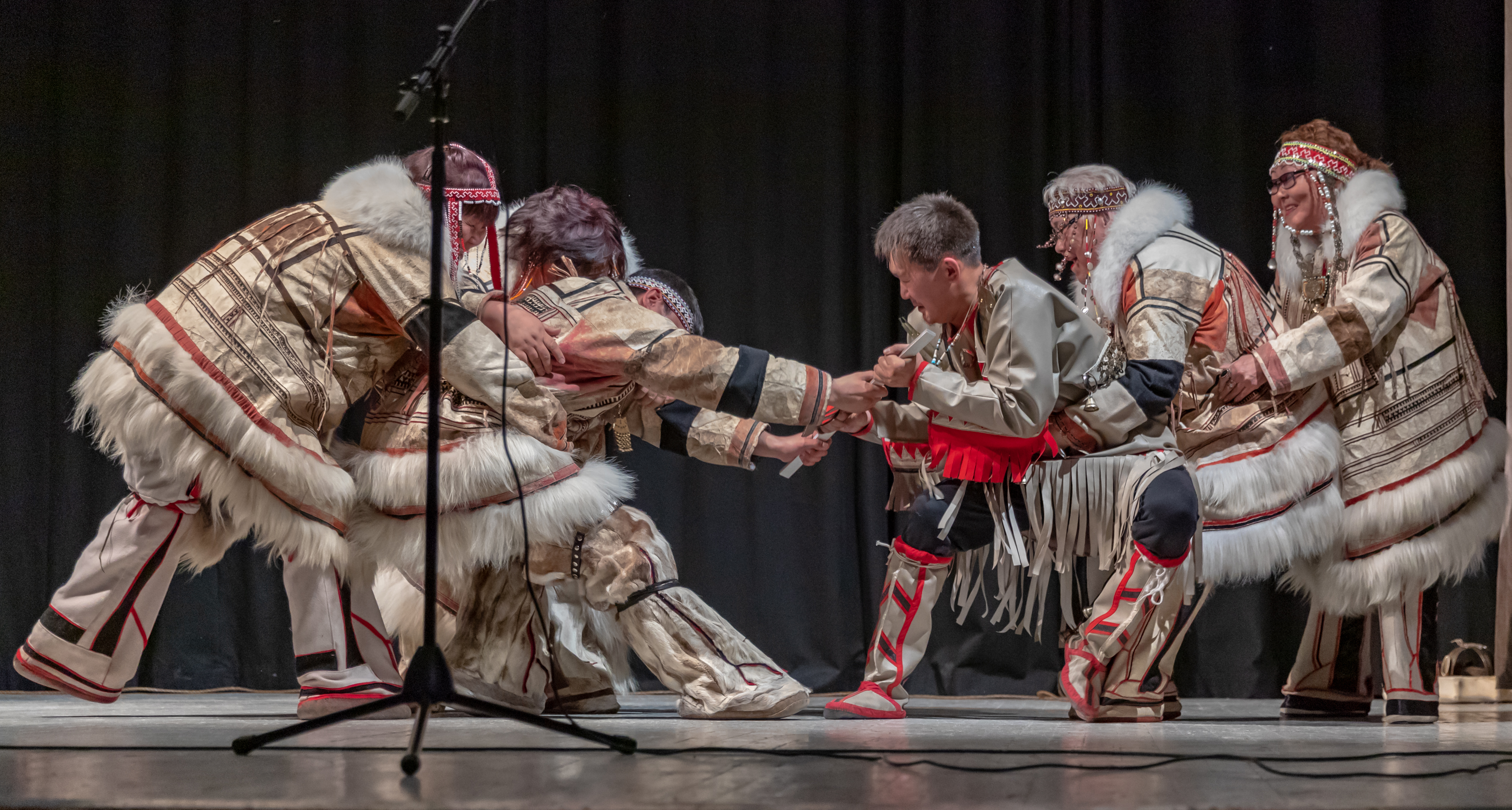
Nganasans form one of the indigenous peoples of the Taymyr.

== See also ==
- Taymyr Nature Reserve
