= Srednekolymsk =

Srednekolymsk Среднеколымск
- Town under district jurisdiction

Other transcription(s)
  - Yakut: Орто Халыма
- Srednekolymsk prior to 2015

- Flag Coat of arms
- Interactive map of Srednekolymsk
- Location of Srednekolymsk Srednekolymsk (Sakha Republic)
- Coordinates: 67°27′20″N 153°42′15″E
- Country: Russia
- Federal subject: Sakha Republic
- Administrative district: Srednekolymsky District
- TownSelsoviet: Srednekolymsk
- Founded: 1644
- Town status since: 1775

Government
  - Body: Parbaala
  - Hokage: Keskil Nikolaev
- Elevation: 25 m (82 ft)

Population (2010 Census)
  - Total: 3,525
  - Estimate (2023): 3,118 (−11.5%)

Administrative status
  - Capital of: Srednekolymsky District, Town of Srednekolymsk

Municipal status
  - Municipal district: Srednekolymsky Municipal District
  - Urban settlement: Srednekolymsk Urban Settlement
  - Capital of: Srednekolymsky Municipal District, Srednekolymsk Urban Settlement
- Time zone: UTC+
- Postal codes: 678790, 678799
- Dialing code: +7 41156
- OKTMO ID: 98646101001
- Town Day: September 15

Srednekolymsk population
- 2010 Census: 3,525
- 2002 Census: 3,587
- 1989 Census: 4,489
- 1979 Census: 3,309

Srednekolymsk (Russian: Среднеколы́мск; Yakut: Орто Халыма, Orto Xalıma) is a town and the administrative center of Srednekolymsky District in the Sakha Republic, Russia, located on the left bank of the Kolyma River, 1,485 kilometers (923 mi) northeast of Yakutsk, the capital of the republic. As of the 2010 Census, its population was 3,525.

== History ==
When the Russians arrived in the 1640s, they built three forts on the Kolyma: Nizhnekolymsk, Srednekolymsk, and Verkhnekolymsk (i.e., lower, middle, and upper Kolymsk). They were about three days sled journey apart. Nizhnekolymsk was on the delta near the route to Anadyrsk. Srednekolymsk was at the head of navigation by seagoing koches, in forested country for good fur trapping and on the overland route to the Indigirka River. Verkhnekolymsk was smaller and upriver. The first fort (ostrog) was founded in 1644 by Mikhail Stadukhin. Some say that this was Nizhnekolymsk, but Fisher thinks that the original fort was Srednekolymsk and that the main Russian center was moved to Nizhnekolymsk by 1655 when the Anadyrsk route became important.

At some point the name was changed to Yarmanka, from the Russian word for "fair", referring to the annual gatherings of indigenous inhabitants of the area here in spring. The settlement grew over the next century, and was granted town status and its present name in 1775. In Imperial times, it was a destination for political exiles.

== Administrative and municipal status ==
Within the framework of administrative divisions, Srendekolymsk serves as the administrative center of Srednekolymsky District. As an inhabited locality, Srednekolymsk is classified as a town under district jurisdiction. As an administrative division, it is, together with one rural locality (the selo of Lobuya), incorporated within Srednekolymsky District as the Town of Srednekolymsk. As a municipal division, the Town of Srednekolymsk is incorporated within Srednekolymsky Municipal District as Srednekolymsk Urban Settlement.

== Economy and infrastructure ==
The town is largely reliant on farming of reindeer, hunting for pelts, and fishing. An ice free port in the summer allows for goods to be shipped up river

=== Transportation ===
The town is served by the Srednekolymsk Airport (IATA: SEK). In the summer, river transport takes place, and in the winter, land transport can be performed on the ice.

== Climate ==
Srednekolymsk has a dry and very cold subarctic climate (Köppen climate classification Dfc), bordering on an extreme subarctic climate (Köppen climate classification Dfd), featuring with mild, sometimes hot, even very hot, but short summers and extremely brutal winters with almost no snowfall. The winter lasts from October until May and temperatures rise rapidly enough for Dahurian larch trees to be able to grow during the fleeting summer, before falling rapidly again in August and September. Temperatures often do not exceed 0 °C (32 °F) between late September and early May.

The midnight sun is above the horizon from 30 May to 13 July, the polar night last from 19 December to 24 December (6 days).

Climate data for Srednekolymsk
Month	Jan	Feb	Mar	Apr	May	Jun	Jul	Aug	Sep	Oct	Nov	Dec	Year
Record high °C (°F)	−4.3 (24.3)	−3.3 (26.1)	2.8 (37.0)	14.6 (58.3)	28.4 (83.1)	33.5 (92.3)	36.7 (98.1)	32.2 (90.0)	24.6 (76.3)	13.6 (56.5)	5.1 (41.2)	−5.3 (22.5)	36.7 (98.1)
Mean daily maximum °C (°F)	−34.4 (−29.9)	−30.9 (−23.6)	−20.5 (−4.9)	−8.2 (17.2)	4.3 (39.7)	16.4 (61.5)	18.9 (66.0)	14.8 (58.6)	7.1 (44.8)	−7.9 (17.8)	−23.8 (−10.8)	−31.7 (−25.1)	−8 (18)
Daily mean °C (°F)	−37.9 (−36.2)	−34.8 (−30.6)	−26.7 (−16.1)	−15.3 (4.5)	−1.1 (30.0)	11.2 (52.2)	13.9 (57.0)	10.1 (50.2)	3.2 (37.8)	−11.1 (12.0)	−27.2 (−17.0)	−35.1 (−31.2)	−12.6 (9.3)
Mean daily minimum °C (°F)	−41.4 (−42.5)	−38.7 (−37.7)	−32.9 (−27.2)	−22.4 (−8.3)	−6.4 (20.5)	5.9 (42.6)	8.8 (47.8)	5.4 (41.7)	−0.8 (30.6)	−14.3 (6.3)	−30.5 (−22.9)	−38.5 (−37.3)	−17.1 (1.2)
Record low °C (°F)	−56.1 (−69.0)	−56.0 (−68.8)	−50.4 (−58.7)	−42.4 (−44.3)	−30.0 (−22.0)	−10.9 (12.4)	−1.6 (29.1)	−5.1 (22.8)	−14.8 (5.4)	−36.1 (−33.0)	−48.2 (−54.8)	−53.5 (−64.3)	−56.1 (−69.0)
Average precipitation mm (inches)	13 (0.5)	9 (0.4)	7 (0.3)	6 (0.2)	8 (0.3)	25 (1.0)	32 (1.3)	27 (1.1)	17 (0.7)	16 (0.6)	15 (0.6)	13 (0.5)	188 (7.5)
Source: Worldwide Bioclimatic Classification System
