= Glotov =

Glotov (Russian: Глотов; masculine) or Glotova (Глотова; feminine) is a Russian surname.

The following people share this surname:

- Alena Glotova (born 2005), Russian artistic gymnast
- Oleksandr Glotov (born 1953), Ukrainian literary historian and journalist
- Stepan Glotov (c. 1729 – 1769), Russian navigator, explorer, and fur trader
- Vladimir Glotov (1937–1981), Soviet footballer
