= Norilsk =

City in Krasnoyarsk Krai, Russia

Norilsk Норильск
- City
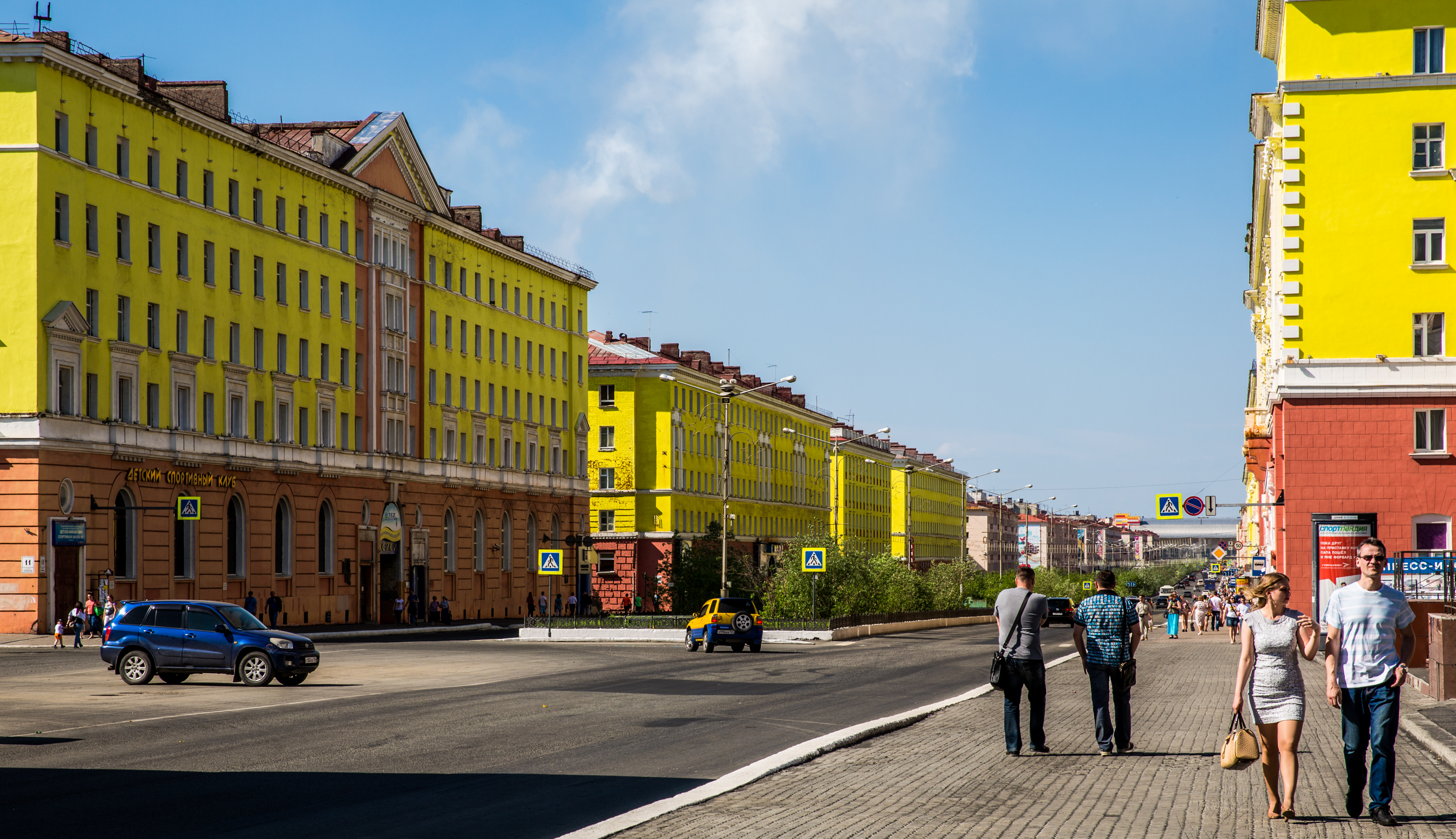
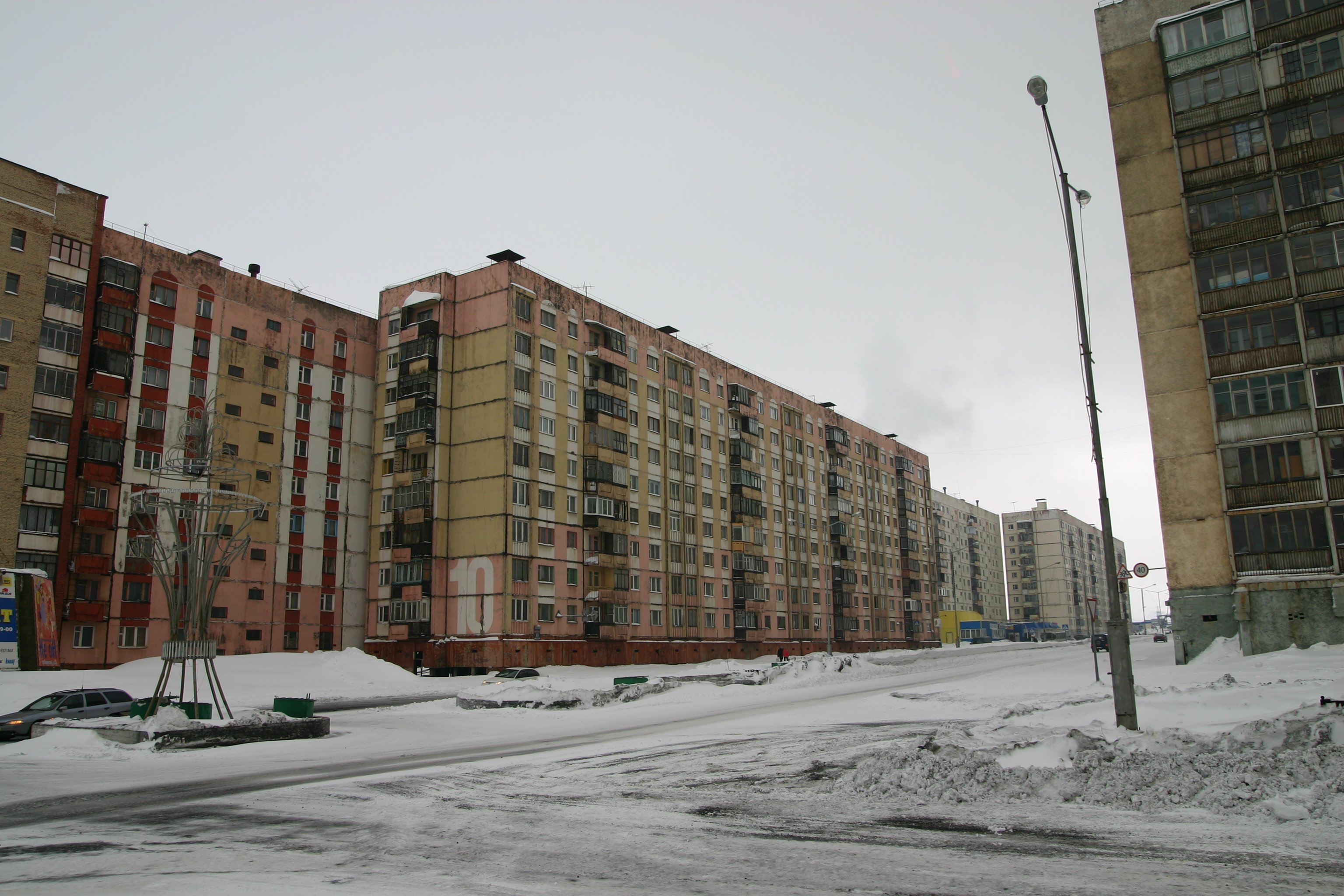
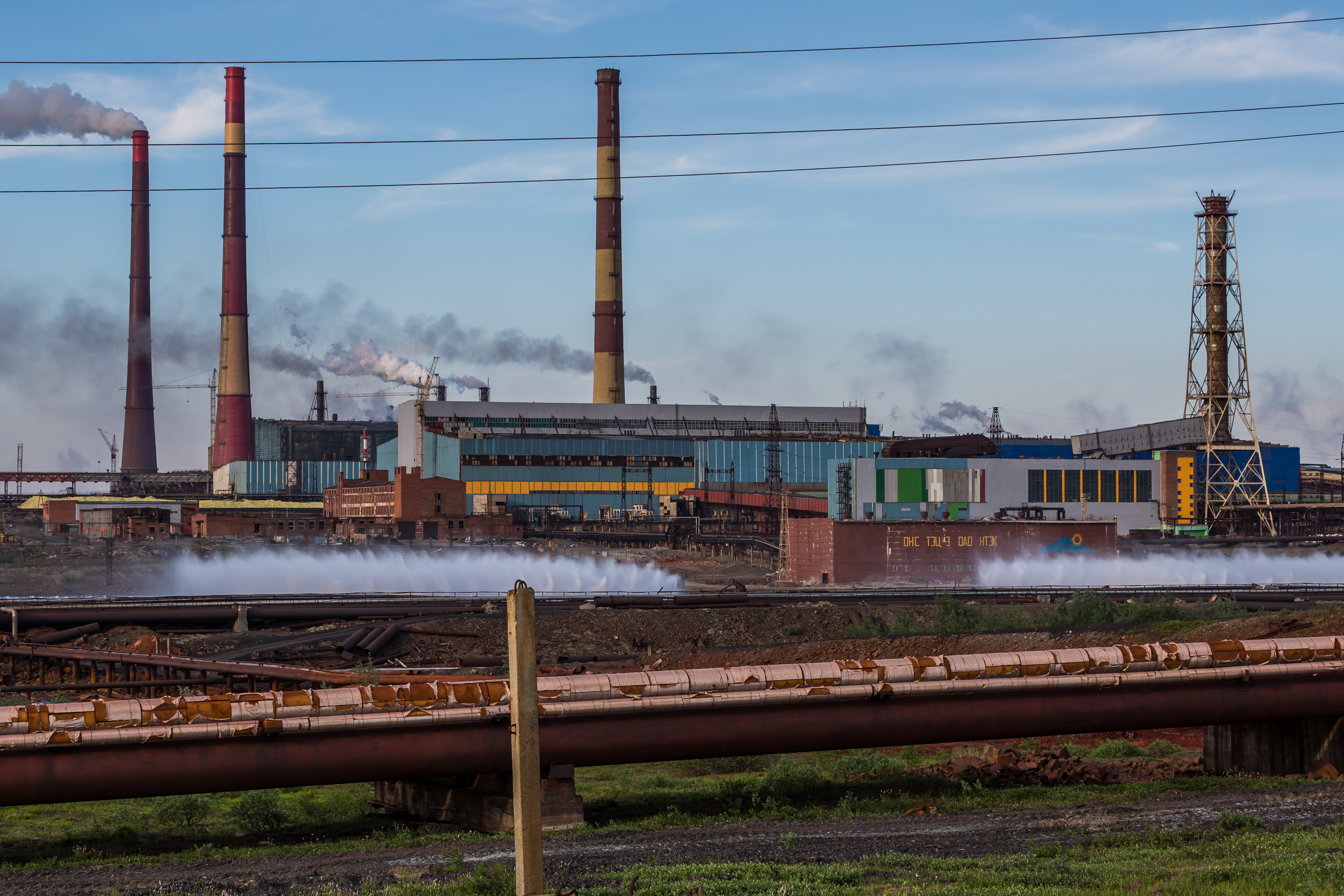
- Leninsky Prospekt in central Norilsk (June 2016) Apartments of Norilsk Norilsk Nickel

- Flag Coat of arms
- Interactive map of Norilsk
- Location of Norilsk Norilsk (Krasnoyarsk Krai)
- Coordinates: 69°20′N 88°13′E
- Country: Russia
- Federal subject: Krasnoyarsk Krai
- Founded: 1935
- City status since: 1953

Area
  - Total: 23.16 km^{2} (8.94 sq mi)
- Elevation: 90 m (300 ft)

Population (2010 Census)
  - Total: 175,365
  - Estimate (2025): 176,735 (+0.8%)
  - Rank: 102nd in 2010
  - Density: 7,572/km^{2} (19,610/sq mi)

Administrative status
  - Subordinated to: district city of Norilsk
  - Capital of: district city of Norilsk

Municipal status
  - Urban okrug: Norilsk Urban Okrug
  - Capital of: Norilsk Urban Okrug
- Time zone: UTC+7 (MSK+4)
- Postal code: 663300-663341
- Dialing code: +7 3919
- OKTMO ID: 04729000001
- Website: норильск.рф

Norilsk (Russian: Нори́льск, IPA: [nɐˈrʲilʲsk]) is an industrial closed city in Krasnoyarsk Krai, Russia, located south of the western Taymyr Peninsula, around 90 km (56 mi) east of the Yenisey River and 1,500 km (930 mi) north of Krasnoyarsk. Norilsk is 300 km (190 mi) north of the Arctic Circle and 2,400 km from the North Pole. It has a permanent population of 176,735 as of 2024, and up to 220,000 including temporary inhabitants. It is the second-largest city in Krasnoyarsk Krai, after the administrative centre, Krasnoyarsk. It is the world's northernmost city with more than 50,000 inhabitants, and the second-largest city (after Murmansk) inside the Arctic Circle. Norilsk and Yakutsk are the only large cities in the continuous permafrost zone.

Norilsk is located atop some of the largest nickel deposits on Earth. Consequently, mining and smelting ore are the major industries. Norilsk is the center of a region where nickel, copper, cobalt, platinum, palladium, and coal are mined. The presence of mineral deposits in the Siberian Craton was known for two centuries before Norilsk was founded, but large-scale industrial mining only began after the Soviet Council of People's Commissars approved the construction of Norilsk Plant in 1935, which was completed by 1939. Production started with intermediary products, with the first converter matte being produced in 1942, but the Norilsk mines quickly grew to be a major source of Russia's nickel production. Prior to this, small scale coal mining existed in the region.

In 2004, two satellite cities (Talnakh and Kayerkan) became districts of the city of Norilsk, and Oganer became a suburb of Norilsk's Central District. The jurisdiction of Norilsk also extends to the settlement of Snezhnogorsk, which originated in 1963 as a settlement to accommodate the builders of the Ust-Khantai Hydroelectric Power Station. Access to Norilsk is restricted for foreign citizens, who are required to obtain special permission to visit.

== Name ==
Norilsk owes its name to its geographical location. The Norilsk river flows near the city, which is located near the Norilsk mountains. The travelers Khariton Laptev, Alexander Fyodorovich Middendorf, and Fedor Bogdanovich Schmidt mentioned the river Norilsk and the Norilsk mountains in their accounts.

According to the Soviet Arctic explorer Nikolay Urvantsev, the Norilsk river was probably given its former name, Norilka, in the 16th–17th centuries during the existence of the city Mangazeya, when the Taymyr was settled by Russian fishing people. It is likely that the name of the river comes from the word norilo, a long thin pole that was used to stretch a string of trap nets from hole to hole under the ice.

Some argue the name derives from the Yukagir word nerile, meaning "an earthen hill, consisting of some crags, cliffs" (the mountains around Norilsk do indeed resemble neriles). Others suggest, the name of the river (Norilka) and, accordingly, the city name come from the Evenk word narus, or nioril in Yukaghir, which mean "swamps". It may also have originated from the name of an Evenk tribe, the Nyurilians; or, from the name of the nearby Lake Murilskoye.

== History ==
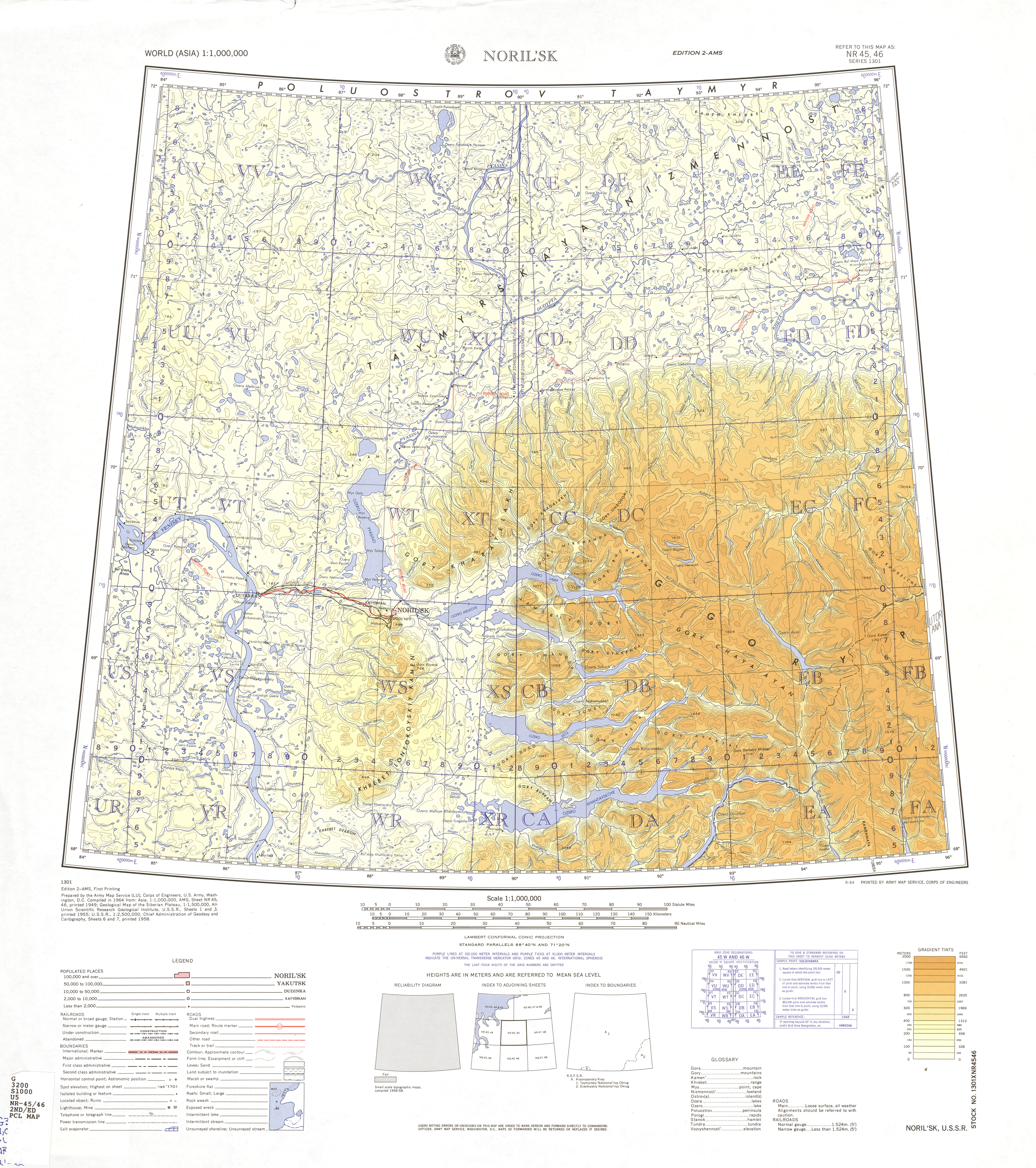
Map of Norilsk (labeled as NORIL'SK) and the surrounding region (AMS, 1964)

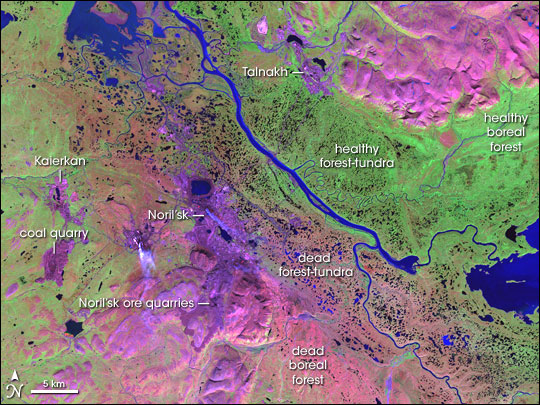
False-color satellite image of Norilsk and the surrounding area (more information)

People knew about the minerals in the Norilsk area as early as the Bronze Age. A site with primitive equipment for smelting and casting, as well as raw materials (balls of native copper), has been discovered near Lake Pyasino.

In the 16th–17th centuries, copper from the Norilsk deposits was used by the inhabitants of Mangazeya, a city located beyond the Arctic Circle on the Taz River, which was an important regional trading and craft center. During the excavations of Mangazeya in 1972–1975, professor Mikhail Ivanovich Belov discovered a vast foundry yard. Platinoids were found in the remains of the copper wares unearthed there.

Geologist and explorer Nikolay Urvantsev further studied the Norilsk region during expeditions between 1919 and 1926, which confirmed the presence of rich deposits of coal and polymetallic ores in the western spurs of the Putorana Plateau.

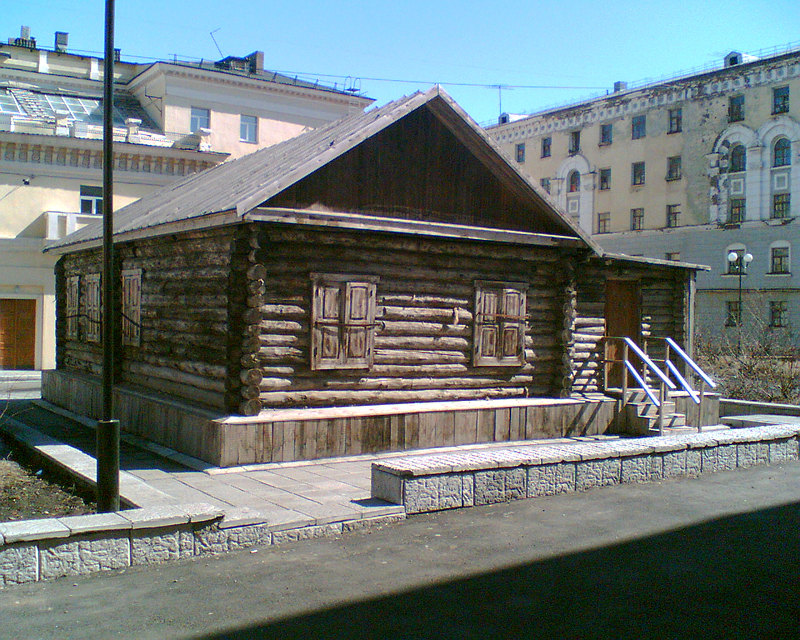
The first house in Norilsk

In 1921, during one of Urvantsev's expeditions, a log cabin was built at the northern foot of Mount Schmidt. This hut is considered to be the first building in Norilsk. The cabin was later moved, and is now located near Norilsk Museum. It has the status of a historical monument.

Norilsk was founded at the end of the 1920s, but the official date of the city's foundation is traditionally held to be 1935, when the Norillag system of Gulag labour camp was established and prisoners began construction work on the Norilsk Mining and Metallurgical Plant. Over the next few years Norilsk grew into a settlement for the Norilsk mining and metallurgical complex, and it was granted urban-type settlement status in 1939, and city status in 1953.

In the late 1940s, architects began to design a new city on the eastern shore of Lake Dolgoye, and Norillag prisoners started building work in 1951. In the summer of 1953, inmates from one of the Norillag camps, Gorlag, went on strike, sparking the Norilsk Uprising.

In 1947, construction began on the Salekhard–Igarka Railway, a line intended to cross northern Siberia. The railway was to have linked the Arctic coal-mining city of Vorkuta in European Russia to the Yenisei River via Salekhard and the Ob River. A spacious railway station was built in Norilsk, in the expectation that the city would eventually have a train service to Moscow, but construction of the Salekhard–Igarka Railway was halted after Joseph Stalin died in 1953.

To support the new city, the Norilsk railway to the port of Dudinka on the Yenisei River was built, first as a narrow-gauge line (winter 1935–36), later as a 1,520 mm (4 ft 11 27/32 in) Russian standard gauge line (completed in the early 1950s).

Norillag was officially closed on August 22, 1956, by order No. 0348 of the Ministry of Internal Affairs. According to the Norillag archives, 16,806 prisoners died in Norilsk as a result of forced labor, starvation and intense cold during the years the camp was operational (1935–1956). Fatalities were especially high during World War II from 1942 to 1944 when food supplies were particularly scarce. An unknown, yet significant number of prisoners continued to work and die in the mines until around 1979.

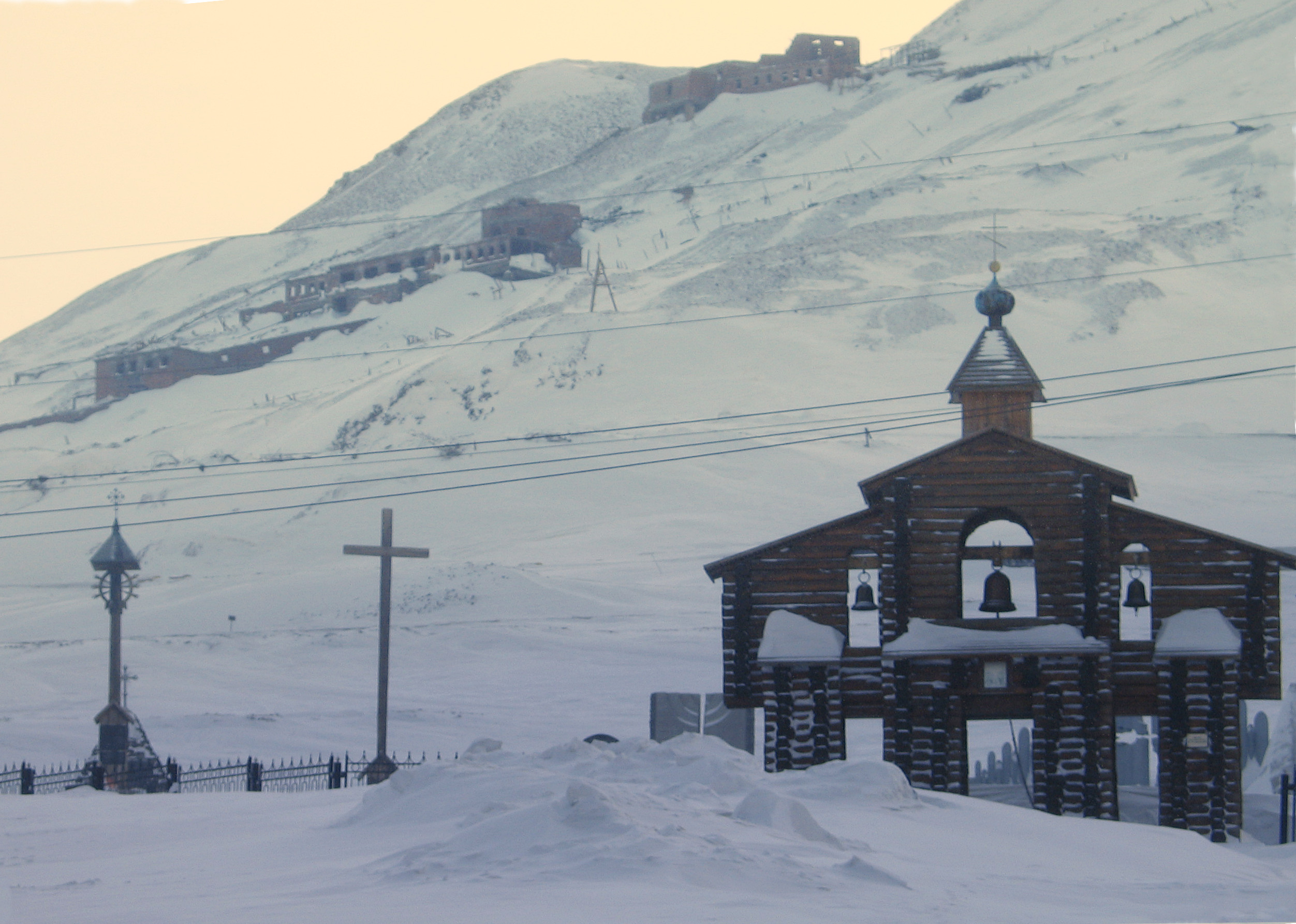
Norilsk Golgotha, a memorial to Gulag prisoners who labored at Norilsk

Several memorial structures have been erected in the city to commemorate Norilsk's Gulag past. Russian author Boris Ivanov wrote about the most famous one:

In the center of Norilsk, on Gvardeyskaya Square, "in an atmosphere of solemnity", a foundation stone was even set, promising the construction of a monument on this spot to those who created the basis of the plant and this miracle city. This basalt block, weighing 100 poods [3,611 pounds (1,638 kg)], delivered from Mount Rudnaya. On a plaque attached to it are the words: "An obelisk will be built here, an eternal reminder of the feat of the Norilsk people who conquered the tundra, created our city and the plant". The foundation stone was laid recently by historical standards, on June 26, 1966 [...]

— Boris Ivanov, Paying for Platinum

On July 17, 2020, a monument to the Metallurgists of Norilsk was unveiled at the site of the foundation stone. The foundation stone itself is part of the sculptural composition.

In the 1980s, the Norilsk Golgotha memorial complex was built on the slope of Mount Schmidtikh to house the mass graves of the prisoners who founded the city. Poland and the (ex-Soviet) Baltic states have erected monuments to their countrymen who died here. Icon lamps also burn in an Orthodox chapel set on the mountainside.

The discovery in 1966 of the Oktyabrskoye deposit of copper–nickel ores, located 40 kilometers northeast of Norilsk, was a milestone in the further development of the region. The mining settlement of Talnakh was founded at the same time. A new complex, the Nadezhda Metallurgical Plant, was built 15 km (9.3 mi) west of Norilsk to process the raw materials from the new deposits. Work began in 1971 and the complex was finished in 1981.

A number of Finnish companies assisted in the construction and automation of Norilsk's No. 2 copper and nickel smelters (in the Nadezhda complex), which led to substantial numbers of Finnish metallurgical and automation experts and their families coming to Norilsk from 1978 onward, creating a Finnish expat community of some hundreds of people for a couple of years.

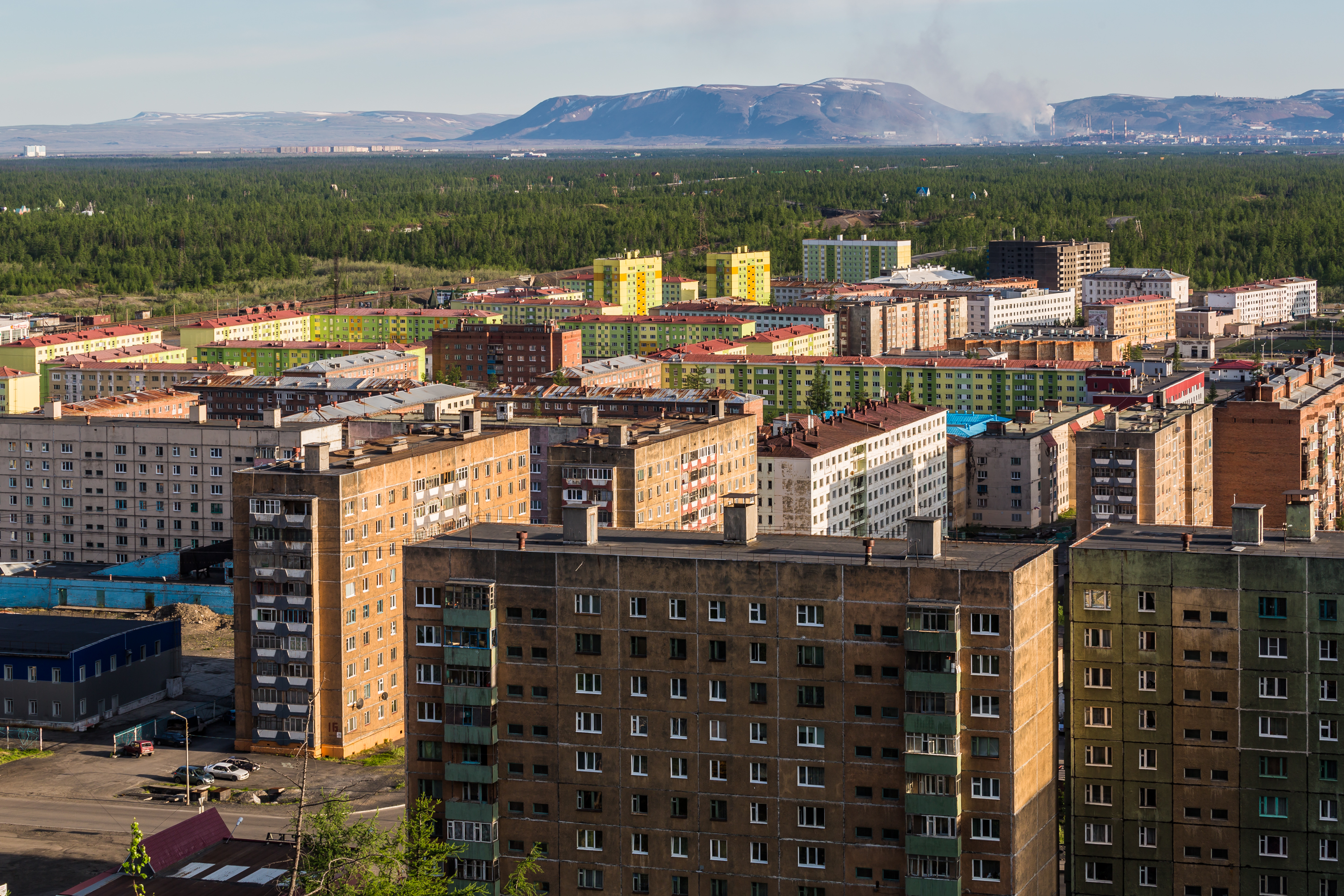
Khrushchyovka apartment buildings in Talnakh, a district of Norilsk

Today Talnakh is the area's major mining and ore enrichment site. Enriched ore emulsion is pumped from here to Norilsk's metallurgy plants.

Enriched nickel and copper are transported from Dudinka to Murmansk by sea, and from there to the Monchegorsk enrichment and smelting plant on the Kola Peninsula, while more precious content goes upriver to Krasnoyarsk. This transportation takes place only during the summer. The port of Dudinka is closed and dismantled during spring flooding in late May, when waters can rise by up to 20 meters (66 ft) (a typical spring occurrence on all Siberian rivers, caused by winter ice obstructing meltwater from upstream).

Norilsk-Talnakh continues to be a dangerous mine to work in. According to the mining company, there were 2.4 accidents per 1,000 workers in 2005. In 2017, Norilsk Nickel claimed that it had reduced its overall lost time injury frequency rate (LTIFR) by almost 60% since 2013.

In June 2020, 20,000 tons of diesel fuel spilled from the tank of an NTEK power plant, polluting hundreds of square kilometers and causing serious damage to the local ecosystem.

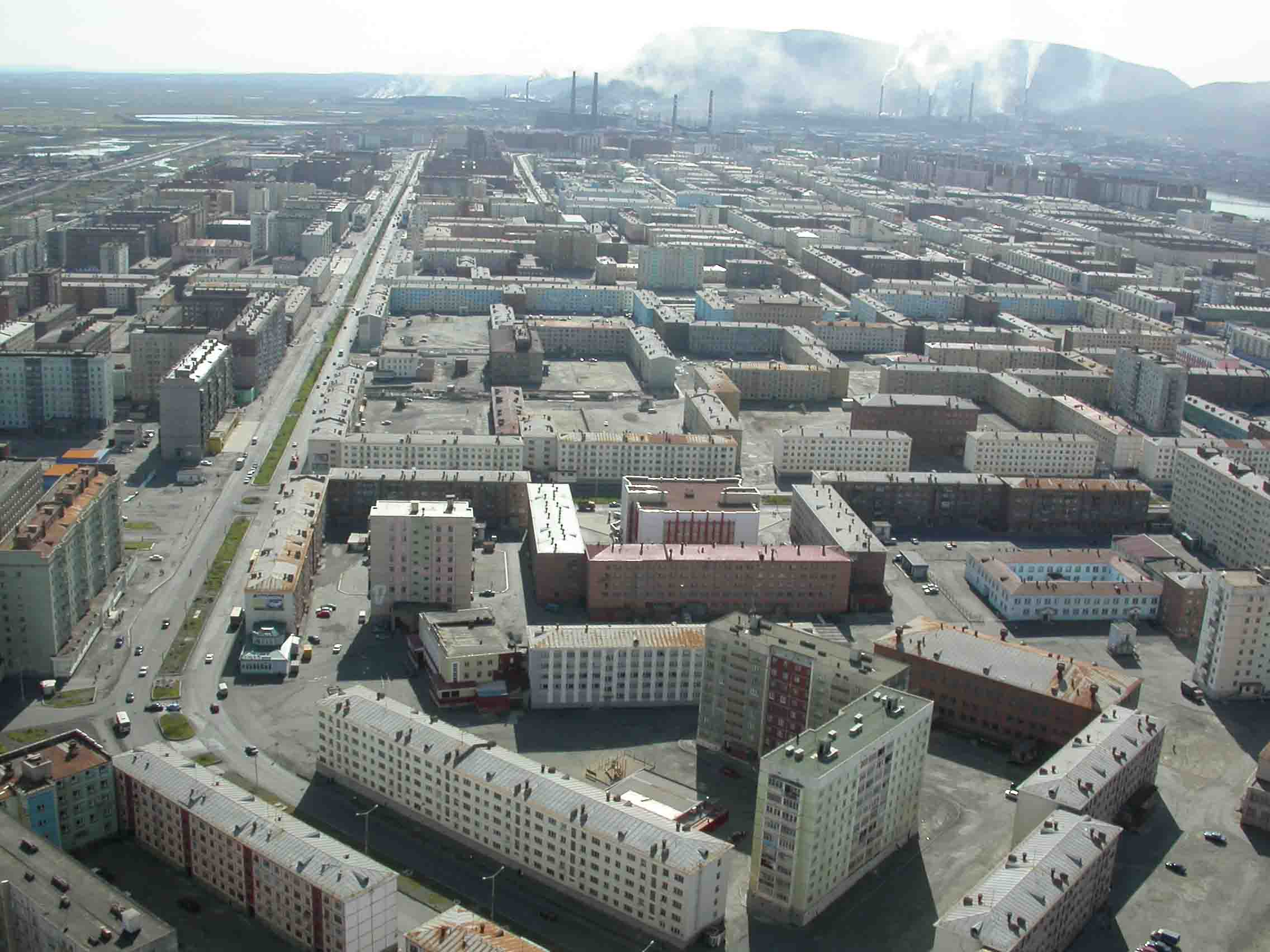
Aerial view of microdistrict № 2

Norilsk remains a closed city, and foreign citizens require special permission to visit the area.

== Administrative and municipal status ==
Within the Russian system of administrative divisions, it is, together with the urban-type settlement of Snezhnogorsk, Krasnoyarsk Territory, incorporated as the district city of Norilsk—an administrative unit with a status equal to that of the districts. As a municipal division, the district city of Norilsk is incorporated as the Norilsk Urban Okrug.

Since 2005, the city of Norilsk has been divided into three geographically disparate administrative districts:

- Tsentralny District (including Oganer), with a population of 107,351
- Talnakh, with a population of 48,502
- Kayerkan, with a population of 20,882

== Government ==
=== Norilsk City Council of Deputies ===
The Norilsk City Council of Deputies was elected on September 11, 2022, with a five-year mandate. Its chairman is Aleksandr Pestryakov.

Faction	Number of deputies
United Russia	28
Liberal Democratic Party of Russia	3
Communist Party of the Russian Federation	3
A Just Russia	1
Russian Ecological Party "The Greens"	1
New People	1

=== Mayor of Norilsk ===
The mayor of Norilsk has been Dmitry Karasyov since January 27, 2021. Following his first five-year term, he was re-elected on January 27, 2026. His term of office will expire in January 2031.

=== Legislative Assembly of the Krasnoyarsk Territory ===
In September 2021, the composition of the Legislative Assembly of the Krasnoyarsk Territory was updated. Sergey Sizonenko was elected deputy for Taymyr constituency No. 23.

== Demographics ==
=== Population ===
Historical population
Year	Pop.	±%
1939	13,886	—
1959	109,442	+688.1%
1970	135,487	+23.8%
1979	180,358	+33.1%
1989	174,673	−3.2%
2002	134,832	−22.8%
2010	175,365	+30.1%
2021	174,453	−0.5%
Source: Censuses

The population of Norilsk as of 2021 is 174,453. After the fall of the USSR the population dropped by 40,000, but this was offset by the subsequent merger of the towns of Kayerkan and Talnakh into Norilsk, maintaining a permanent population of 175,000. Including temporary residents, the population can reach up to 220,000.

Life expectancy for local residents is about 10 years less than average Russian life expectancy, which as of 2013 was around 69 years.

=== Ethnic composition ===
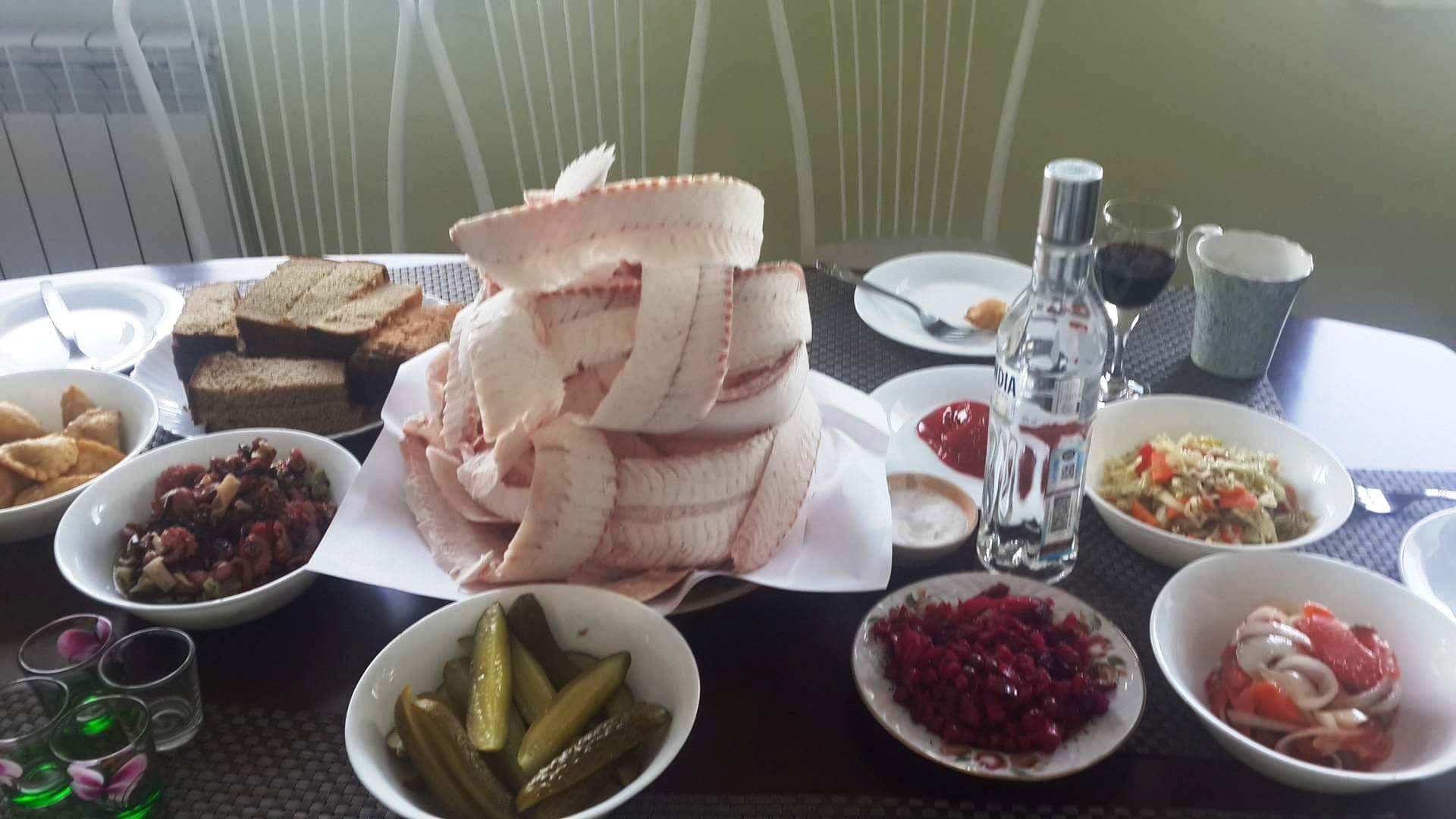
Stroganina, sliced raw fish, is one of the traditional foods eaten by Siberia's northern indigenous peoples.

The city has an ethnically diverse population. As of 2021, the predominant ethnic and cultural groups were Russians, Azerbaijanis, Ukrainians, Tatars, Bashkirs, Nogais, Lezgins, Kazakhs, Ossetians, Chuvash and Kyrgyz. The population of Norilsk consists almost entirely of people who moved to the city in the second half of the 20th century and their descendants, but many of the descendants of prisoners who were amnestied in 1953 still live in the city. There are very few representatives of indigenous ethnicities—Nenets, Enets, Nganasans and Dolgans—in the city.

There were 77 recognized ethnic groups in Norilsk as of 2021.

Ethnicity	Population	Percentage
Russians	107,189	81.7%
Azerbaijanis	4,694	3.6%
Ukrainians	2,683	2.0%
Tatars	1,792	1.4%
Bashkirs	1,769	1.3%
Nogais	1,748	1.3%
Lezgins	1,588	1.2%
Others	9,806	7.5%

As of January 1, 2021, in terms of population, the city ranked 103rd out of 1,116 cities in the Russian Federation.

	2009	2017	2018	2019	2020
Born	2,407	2,478	2,381	2,120	2,148
Died	1,205	1,055	1,024	841	1,061
Natural population increase	1,202	1,423	1,357	1,279	1,087
Migration inflow	3,591	13,395	14,207	12,585	11,692
Migration outflow	6,752	13,233	14,139	13,024	11,692
Increase/decrease due to migration	-3,161	162	68	-439	-257

Source — FEDERAL SERVICE OF STATE STATISTICS

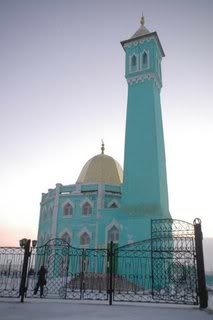
Nord Kamal Mosque is the world's northernmost mosque.

=== Religion ===
Orthodox Christianity is the main religion in Norilsk. There is a Russian Orthodox cathedral, several Russian Orthodox churches and a Ukrainian Orthodox church. There is also a mosque in Norilsk. Built in 1998 and belonging to the local Tatar community, it is considered to be the northernmost Muslim prayer house in the world.

Since 2014, the city has been the center of the newly formed Norilsk Diocese of the Russian Orthodox Church.

== Time zone ==
Norilsk is on Krasnoyarsk Time, seven hours ahead of UTC (UTC+07:00) and 4 hours ahead of Moscow Time (MSK+4)

== Geography ==
Norilsk sits between the West Siberian Plain and Central Siberian Plateau at the foot of the 1,700-meter-high (5,600 ft) Putorana Mountains. Due to Norilsk's geographical isolation on the Taymyr Peninsula, the rest of Russia is usually referred to as "the mainland", and expressions like "move to the mainland" or "on the mainland" are common among locals.

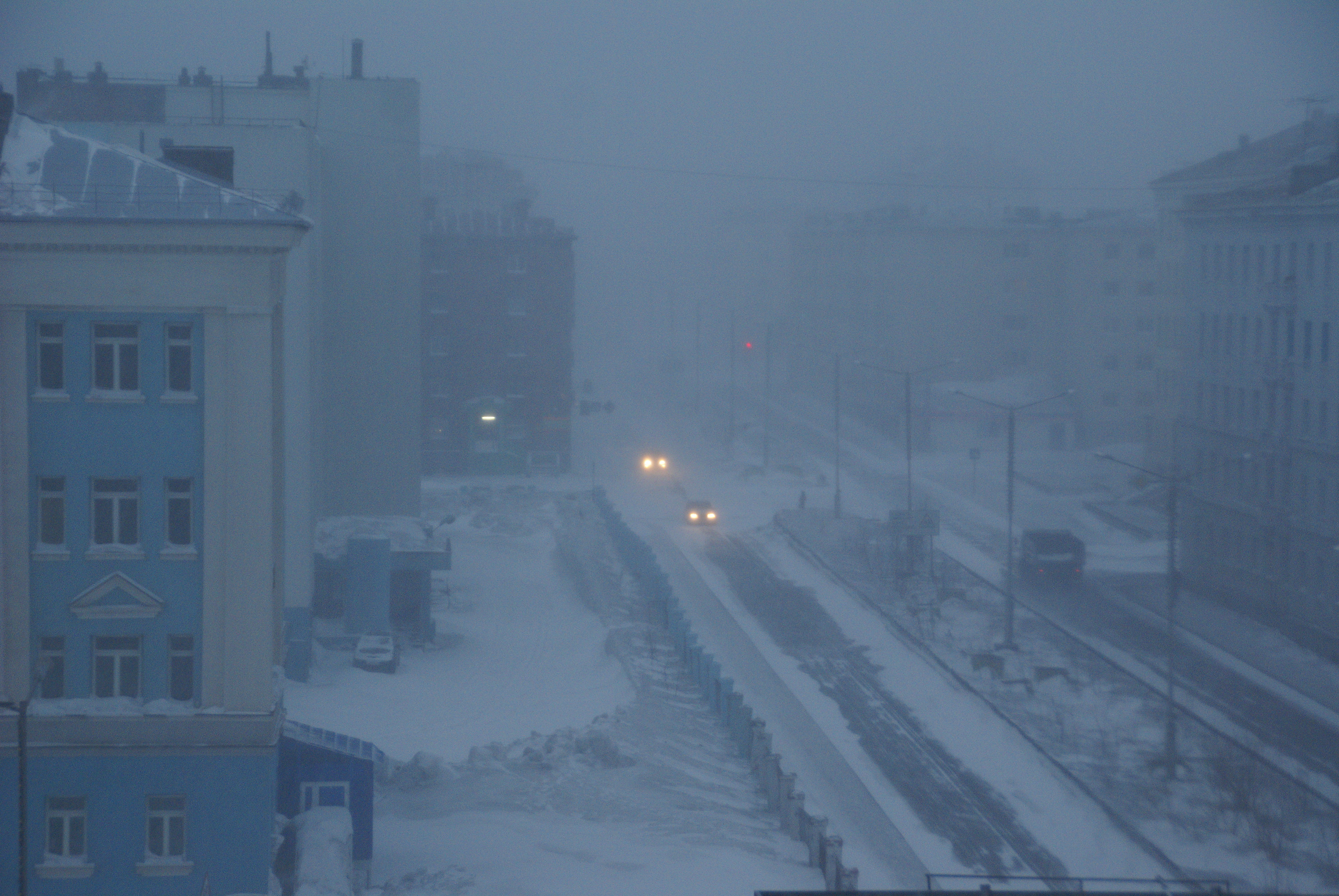
Foggy and snowy weather in the middle of April

Norilsk is one of the world's most northerly settlements and is both the second largest city built on permafrost (after Yakutsk), and the second largest city inside the Arctic Circle (after Murmansk). The midnight sun is above the horizon from May 20 to July 24, and the time when the sun does not rise, polar night, lasts from approximately November 30 to January 13.

=== Climate ===
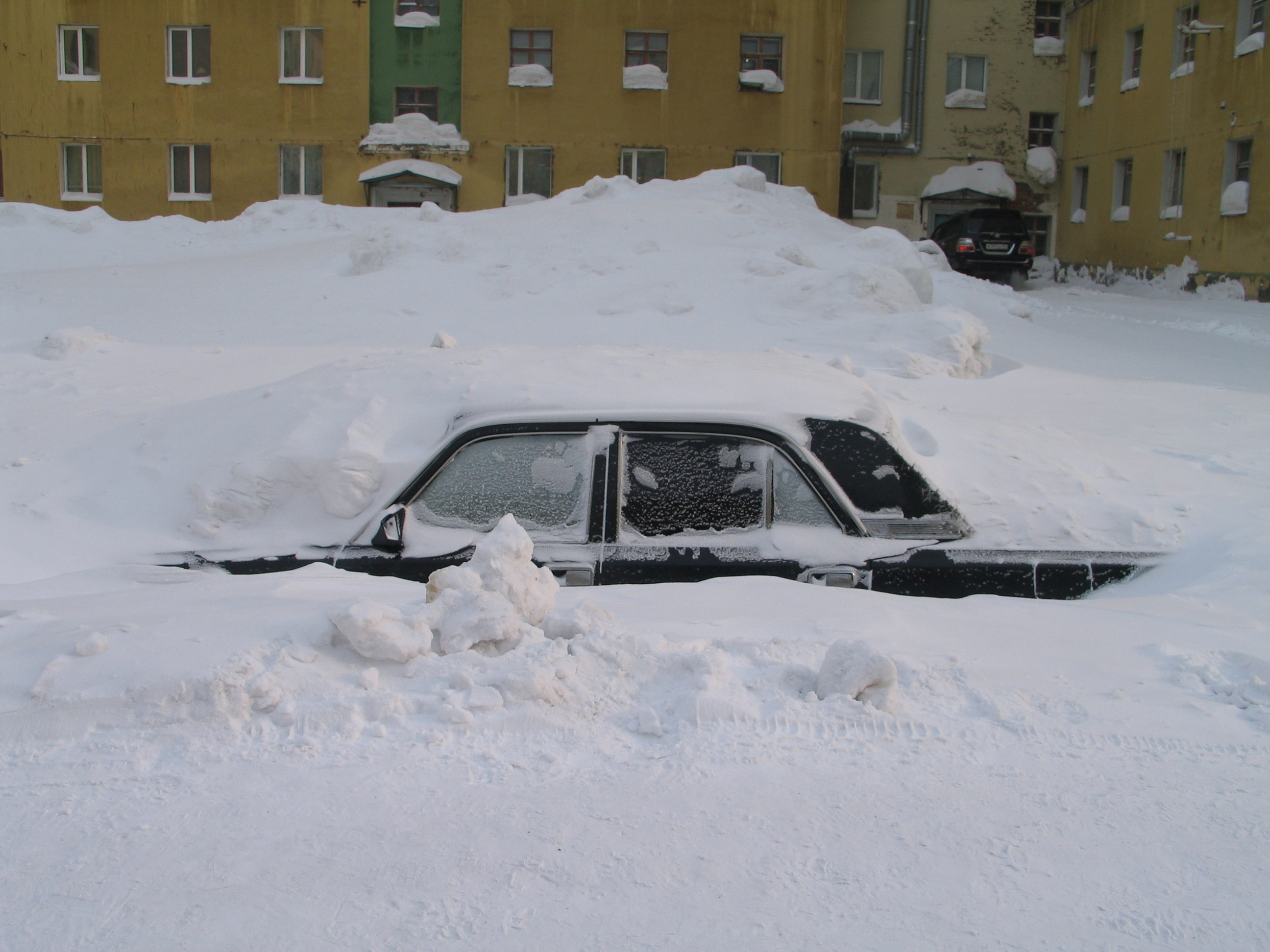
A car buried under snow due to Norilsk's extreme snowfall

Although it is located inside the Arctic Circle, Norilsk has a subarctic climate (Köppen: Dfc; Trewartha: Ecld) with long, snowy, bitterly cold winters and short, cool and wet summers. Norilsk has an average annual air temperature of −8.3 °C (17.1 °F), with an annual variation of absolute temperatures of 85 °C (153 °F). The average annual relative humidity is about 76%. It rivals Yakutsk as the coldest sizable city in the world and is far colder than Murmansk at almost the same latitude but warmed by the Gulf Stream. Although Norilsk is located south of the arctic tree line, much of the surrounding area is naturally forest-tundra, and there are few trees in the city itself.

The average January temperature in Norilsk is −26.5 °C or −15.7 °F, or -40 whilst the winter extends for eight months a year (end of September to end of May), and snow cover lasts from 7 to 9 months, with more than 50 days of snowstorms. Norilsk's winter is known for its length, extreme snowiness and strong winds; it is not rare that hard freezing temperatures are combined with storm winds.

Spring, summer and autumn together fit into the remaining four months between the end of May and the end of September. Summer itself is short – occupying only the month of July – cool, cloudy and wet. The average July temperature is 14.5 °C or 58.1 °F, although temperatures can sometimes rise above 30 °C (86 °F). The record high Temperature is 32.2 °C or 90.0 °F on 27 June 2026.

Climate data for Norilsk
Month	Jan	Feb	Mar	Apr	May	Jun	Jul	Aug	Sep	Oct	Nov	Dec	Year
Record high °C (°F)	−0.6 (30.9)	−0.6 (30.9)	7.4 (45.3)	14.0 (57.2)	23.0 (73.4)	32.2 (90.0)	32.0 (89.6)	30.2 (86.4)	24.5 (76.1)	16.1 (61.0)	2.8 (37.0)	−0.4 (31.3)	32.2 (90.0)
Mean daily maximum °C (°F)	−23.2 (−9.8)	−22.3 (−8.1)	−14.5 (5.9)	−7.3 (18.9)	0.5 (32.9)	12.9 (55.2)	19.0 (66.2)	15.9 (60.6)	7.5 (45.5)	−4.6 (23.7)	−17.1 (1.2)	−20.6 (−5.1)	−4.5 (23.9)
Daily mean °C (°F)	−26.5 (−15.7)	−25.9 (−14.6)	−18.7 (−1.7)	−12.0 (10.4)	−3.2 (26.2)	8.5 (47.3)	14.5 (58.1)	11.7 (53.1)	4.4 (39.9)	−7.4 (18.7)	−20.5 (−4.9)	−24.2 (−11.6)	−8.3 (17.1)
Mean daily minimum °C (°F)	−30.0 (−22.0)	−29.4 (−20.9)	−22.6 (−8.7)	−15.9 (3.4)	−6.5 (20.3)	5.0 (41.0)	10.7 (51.3)	8.3 (46.9)	2.0 (35.6)	−10.1 (13.8)	−23.8 (−10.8)	−27.7 (−17.9)	−11.7 (11.0)
Record low °C (°F)	−53.1 (−63.6)	−52.0 (−61.6)	−48.0 (−54.4)	−38.7 (−37.7)	−26.8 (−16.2)	−9.8 (14.4)	0.4 (32.7)	−1.7 (28.9)	−13.0 (8.6)	−36.0 (−32.8)	−48.9 (−56.0)	−51.0 (−59.8)	−53.1 (−63.6)
Average precipitation mm (inches)	31 (1.2)	32 (1.3)	27 (1.1)	29 (1.1)	33 (1.3)	44 (1.7)	49 (1.9)	59 (2.3)	41 (1.6)	46 (1.8)	38 (1.5)	38 (1.5)	468 (18.4)
Average precipitation days	11.7	10.9	14.0	13.9	15.7	14.0	13.4	15.9	16.3	18.5	13.7	13.6	171.6
Mean daily sunshine hours	0	1	5	8	8	8	10	6	3	2	0	0	4
Average ultraviolet index	0	0	1	2	3	3	4	3	1	0	0	0	1
Source: Weatherbase MeteoBlue Weather Atlas OGMIET

=== Norilsk-Talnakh nickel deposits ===
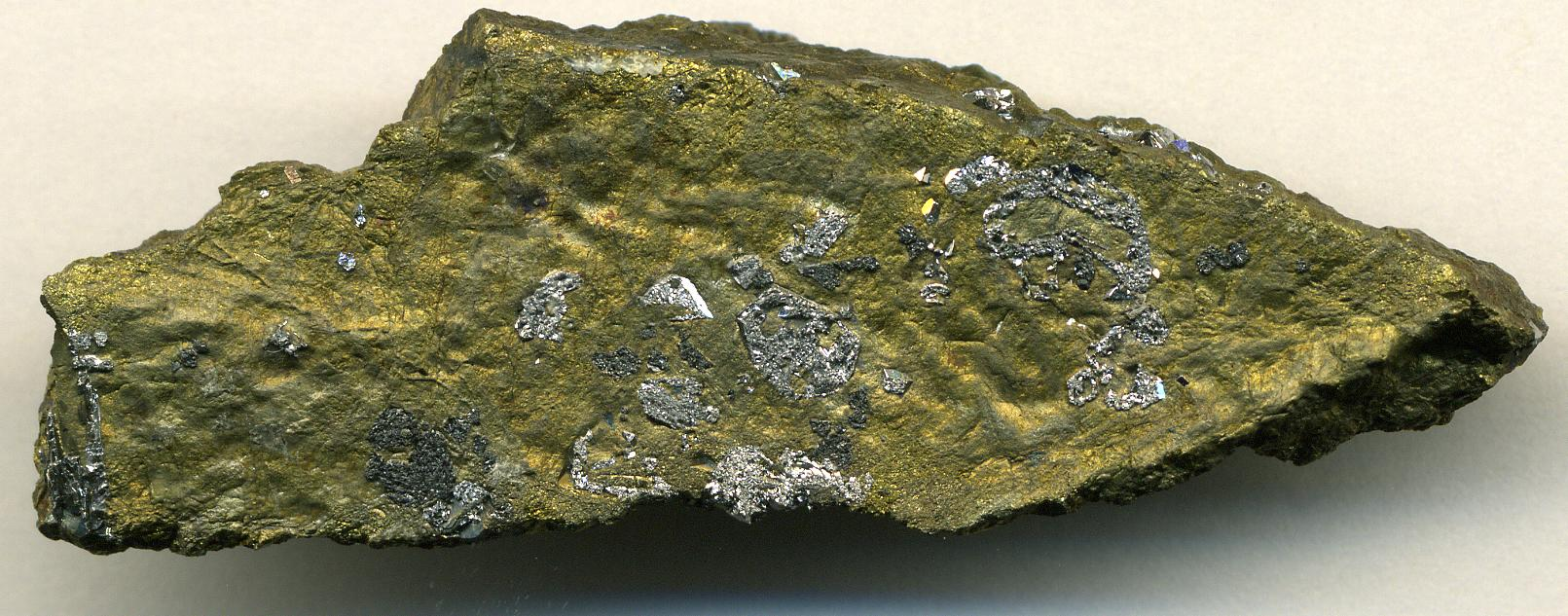
Rich platinum–copper ore, Oktyabrsky Mine, Norilsk. Click image for details.

The nickel deposits of Norilsk-Talnakh are the largest known nickel–copper–palladium deposits in the world. The deposit was formed 250 million years ago during the eruption of the Siberian Traps igneous province (STIP). The STIP erupted over one million cubic kilometers of lava, a large portion of it through a series of flat-lying lava conduits below Norilsk and the Talnakh Mountains.

The current resource known for these mineralized intrusion exceeds 1.8 billion tons.

Norilsk is a center of non-ferrous metallurgy and is home to mining giant Norilsk Nickel's mining operations.

=== Ecology ===
Norilsk faces significant ecological and environmental challenges, though recent initiatives have been undertaken to address some of the region's major pollution issues.

==== Pollution ====
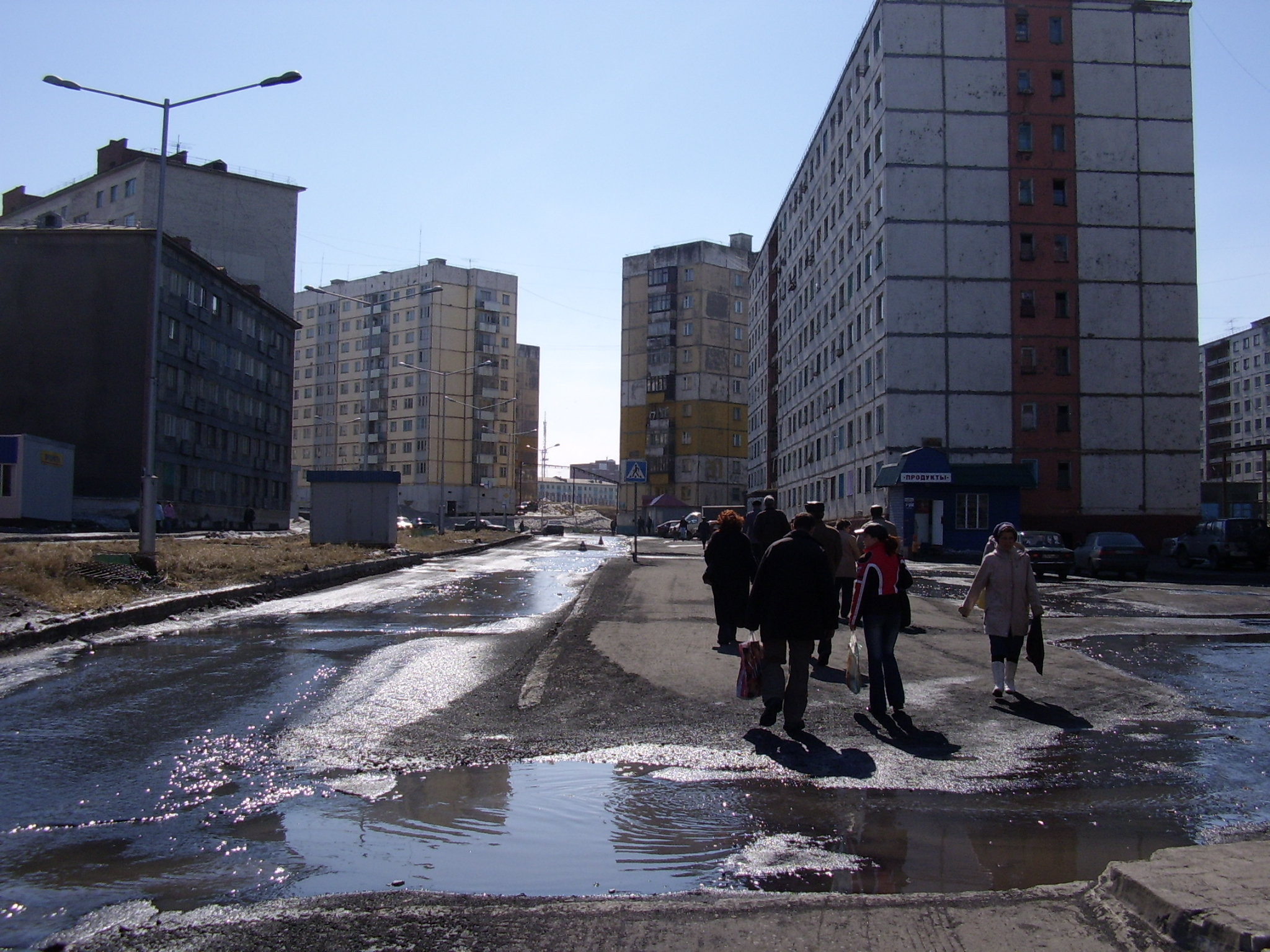
Pedestrians in Norilsk

Russia's Federal State Statistics Service lists Norilsk as the most polluted city in Russia. In 2017, Norilsk produced 1.798 million tons of carbon pollutants—nearly six times more than the 304,600 tons that were generated by Russia's second-most polluted city, Cherepovets. Norilsk, the report states, decontaminates almost half of its emissions.

In addition, the Blacksmith Institute has included Norilsk in its list of the 10 most polluted places on Earth. The list cites air pollution by particulates, including radioisotopes strontium-90, and caesium-137; the metals nickel, copper, cobalt, and lead; selenium; and by gases (such as nitrogen and carbon oxides, sulfur dioxide, phenols and hydrogen sulfide). The Institute estimates that 4 million tons of cadmium, copper, lead, nickel, arsenic, selenium and zinc are released into the air every year.

Nickel ore is smelted at the company's processing site at Norilsk. This smelting is directly responsible for severe pollution, which generally comes in the form of acid rain and smog. By some estimates, Norilsk's nickel mines produce 1 percent of global sulfur dioxide emissions. Heavy metal pollution near Norilsk is so severe that it has now become economically feasible to mine surface soil, as the soil has acquired such high concentrations of platinum and palladium.

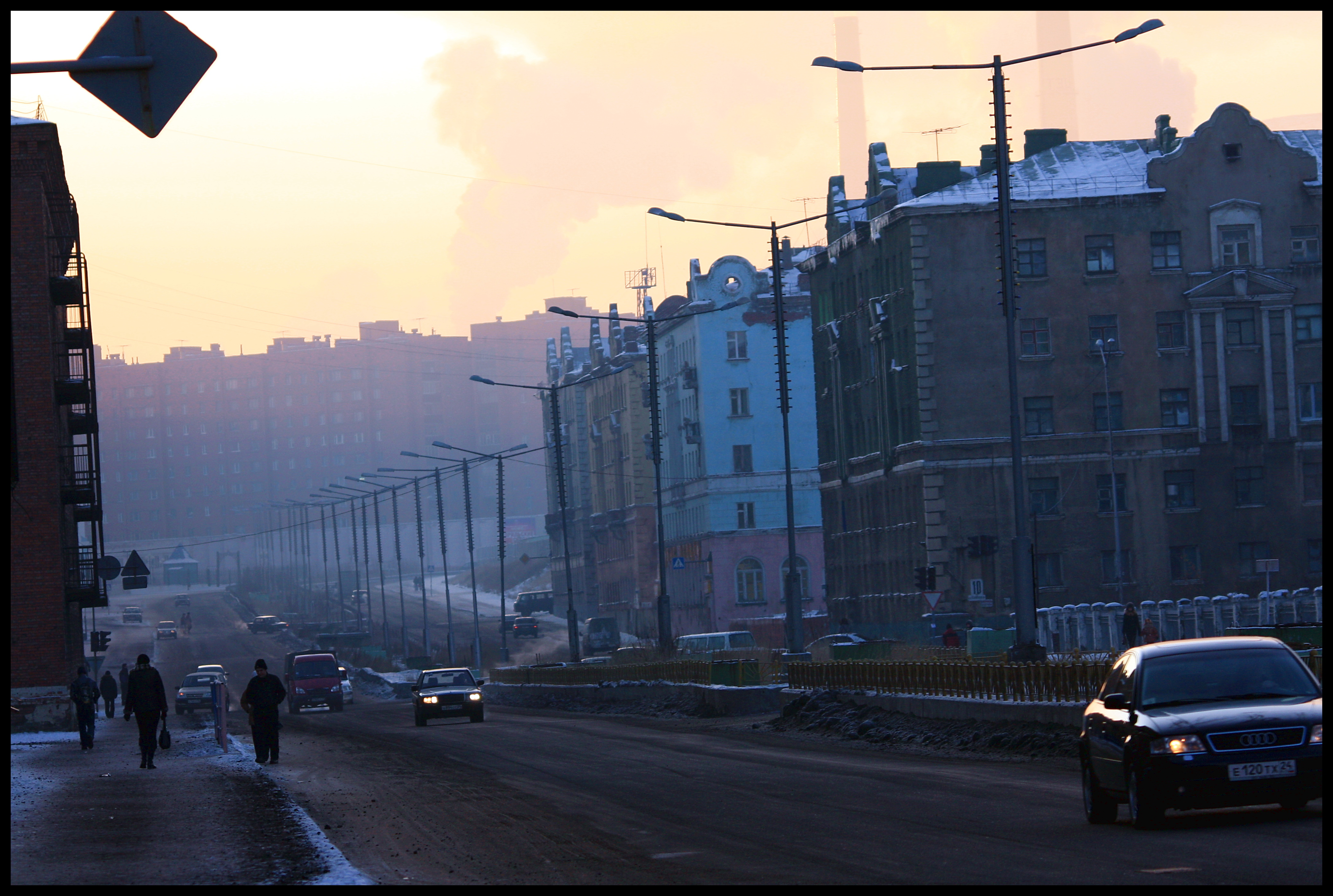
Pedestrians and cars on Kirova street in 2008

According to an April 2007 BBC News report, Norilsk Nickel accepted personal responsibility for what had happened to the forests around the city, and insisted that the company was implementing measures to reduce pollution. In 2016, company chairman Vladimir Potanin admitted that environmental issues were the company's biggest problem.

In September 2016, images surfaced on social media of the nearby Daldykan River, which had turned red. Russia's Environment Ministry issued a statement claiming that preliminary evidence pointed towards Nornickel-owned wastewater pipes from a nearby smelting plant as the source of the contamination. The company referred to intense rainfall and insisted that the incident of sedimentary coloring presented no danger to people or wildlife. The smelting plant, the company said, was in the process of being modernized. Nonetheless, accusations of illegal waste dumping continue to plague the company.

==== Environmental initiatives ====
The closure of the nickel plant in June 2016 was an important step toward the improvement of the environmental situation in the city, and made it possible to cut annual pollutant emissions from the plant by about 400,000 tons.

Norilsk Nickel has stated that the total emissions of its Russian operations were 6% lower in 2016 than in 2015, primarily thanks to the shutdown of the smelter. Following the completion of a large-scale project to upgrade the Talnakh concentrator, the enterprise's capacity has grown by more than 30%, from 7.6 to 10.2 million tons of ore per year. In addition to achieving higher production rates, the goal of the modernization was also to reduce the negative impact on the environment by increasing the recovery of sulfur from ore to tailings.

In 2017, Norilsk Nickel announced that it had invested $14 billion in a major development program aimed at reducing sulfur dioxide emissions in Norilsk by 75% by 2023, using 2015 as a base year. One of the bigger steps taken to combat pollution was the closure of Nornickel's old smelter in Norilsk, the main source of SO_{2} emissions within the city boundaries since 1942.

In 2018, Norilsk Nickel announced the Sulfur Project, which includes the modernization of the Copper Plant, located within the city, and the relocation of blister copper production to the Nadezhda plant, outside the city. Norilsk's Arena sports and entertainment complex has a showroom where you can see information about the Sulfur Program and Norilsk Nickel's other environmental projects.

In 2021, the Clean Norilsk project was launched, with the support of Federal Minister of Natural Resources and Ecology Alexander Kozlov. The aim of the initiative is to demolish about 500 abandoned buildings and structures, and remove about 2 million square meters of industrial waste. The Clean Norilsk project was included in the nationwide environmental program Clean Arctic.

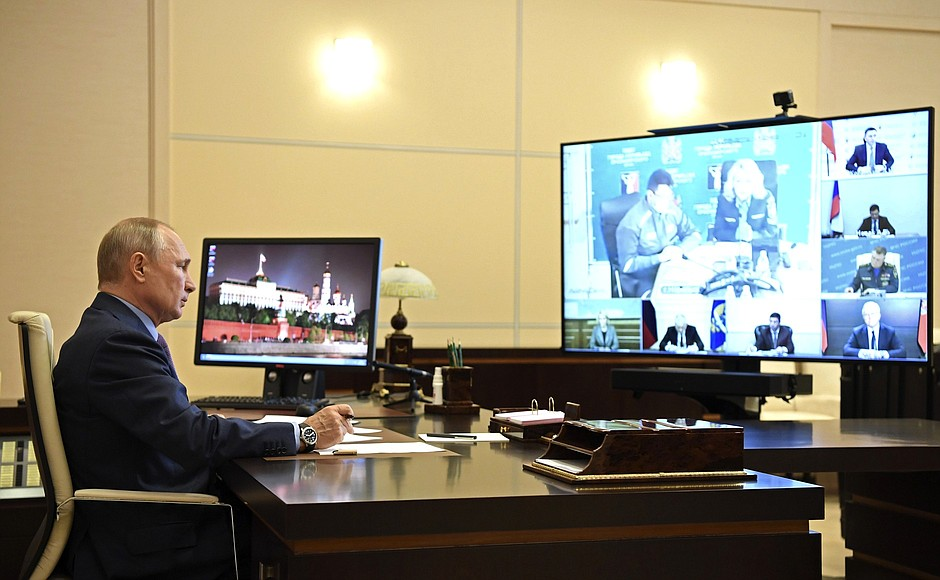
President Putin chairing a meeting about the fuel spill on June 3, 2020

==== May 2020 diesel spill ====
On May 29, 2020 a fuel reservoir owned by Nornickel subsidiary NTEK at CHPP-3 ruptured during depressurization, spilling approximately 21,000 tons of diesel fuel and directly threatening the ecosystem of the Arctic Ocean. It was one of the largest oil spills in Russian history. As a result of the leak, according to preliminary estimates, 6,000 tons soaked into the ground, and 15,000 tons leaked into the nearby Ambarnaya River and Daldykan River. By June 3, according to Rosprirodnadzor, the maximum permissible concentration of harmful substances in the water of the Ambarnaya River exceeded the norm by tens of thousands of times. Vladimir Putin, the Russian president, declared a state of emergency. The fuel was a reserve used as a backup for the main gas supply to a power plant. The storage tank was built on permafrost, which, according to a statement by the company, could possibly have melted and become unstable due to climate change. An area of 350 square kilometers (135 square miles) was contaminated and it is proving difficult to clean up the area because there are no roads and the river is too shallow for boats and barges. Oleg Mitvol, former deputy head of Rosprirodnadzor, estimated that the clean-up would cost about 100 billion rubles (US$1.5 billion) and take 5–10 years.

Vice-speaker of the Taymyr Duma Sergey Sizonenko noted that about 700 of Taymyr's indigenous people live in the affected area.

As a result of the proceedings, Norilsk Nickel was obliged to pay a fine of 146 billion rubles, which went into the federal budget of the Russian Federation, rather than the budget of the municipality. On August 26, 2021, the head of the Ministry of Emergency Situations of the Russian Federation Alexander Chupriyan announced that clean-up work was complete.

=== Water ===
At the beginning of 2020, 43 water treatment facilities were operational in Norilsk. The system is constantly being upgraded. The modernization work is partly funded by Norilsk Nickel.

== Economy ==
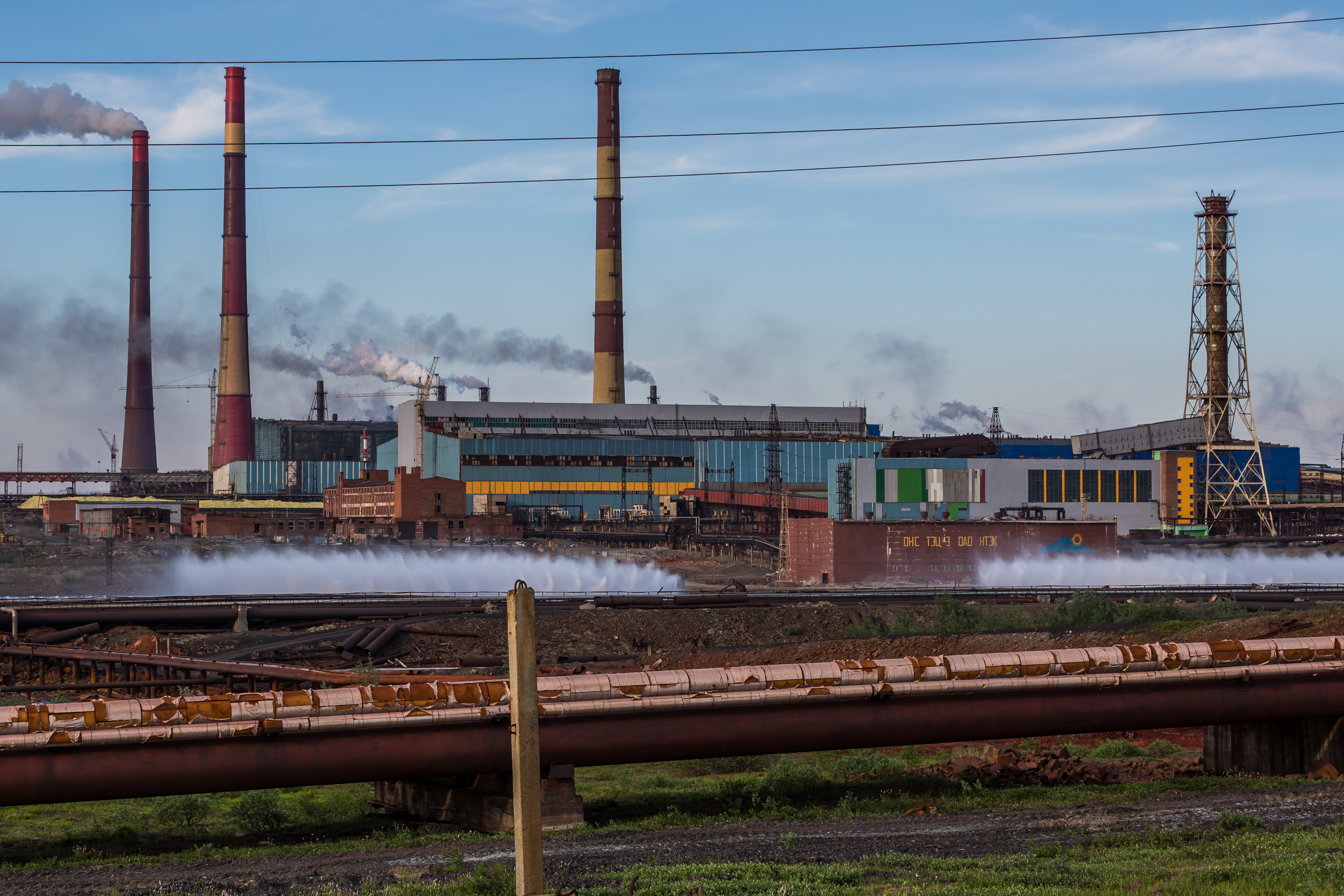
Norilsk Nickel, Nadezhda Plant

MMC Norilsk Nickel (formerly the Norilsk Mining and Metallurgical Combine), a mining company, is the principal employer in the Norilsk area. Norilsk is a major center of non-ferrous metallurgy; the following non-ferrous metals are mined here: copper, nickel, cobalt; precious metals: palladium, osmium, platinum, gold, silver, iridium, rhodium, ruthenium; by-products: technical sulfur, metallic selenium and tellurium, sulfuric acid. The company produces 35% of the world's palladium, 25% of its platinum, 20% of its nickel, 20% of its rhodium, and 10% of its cobalt. In Russia, 96% of nickel, 95% of cobalt, and 55% of copper is produced by Norilsk Nickel. In 2007 the total volume of commodities produced and services carried out by the company in various manufacturing industries amounted to 321.5 billion rubles. In 2021 Norilsk Nickel's net profit increased by 92% to $6.974 billion.

The Norilsk industrial region has all the necessary infrastructure for the production of non-ferrous metals: electric power, hydropower, industrial construction and building material production, and repair and service enterprises.

Energy is supplied from the Norilsk CHPP-1, CHPP-2, and CHPP-3 combined cycle power plants, which are located in different parts of the city and are owned by Norilsk Nickel. The company's industrial enterprises are the principal consumers of electricity in the city.

== Transport ==
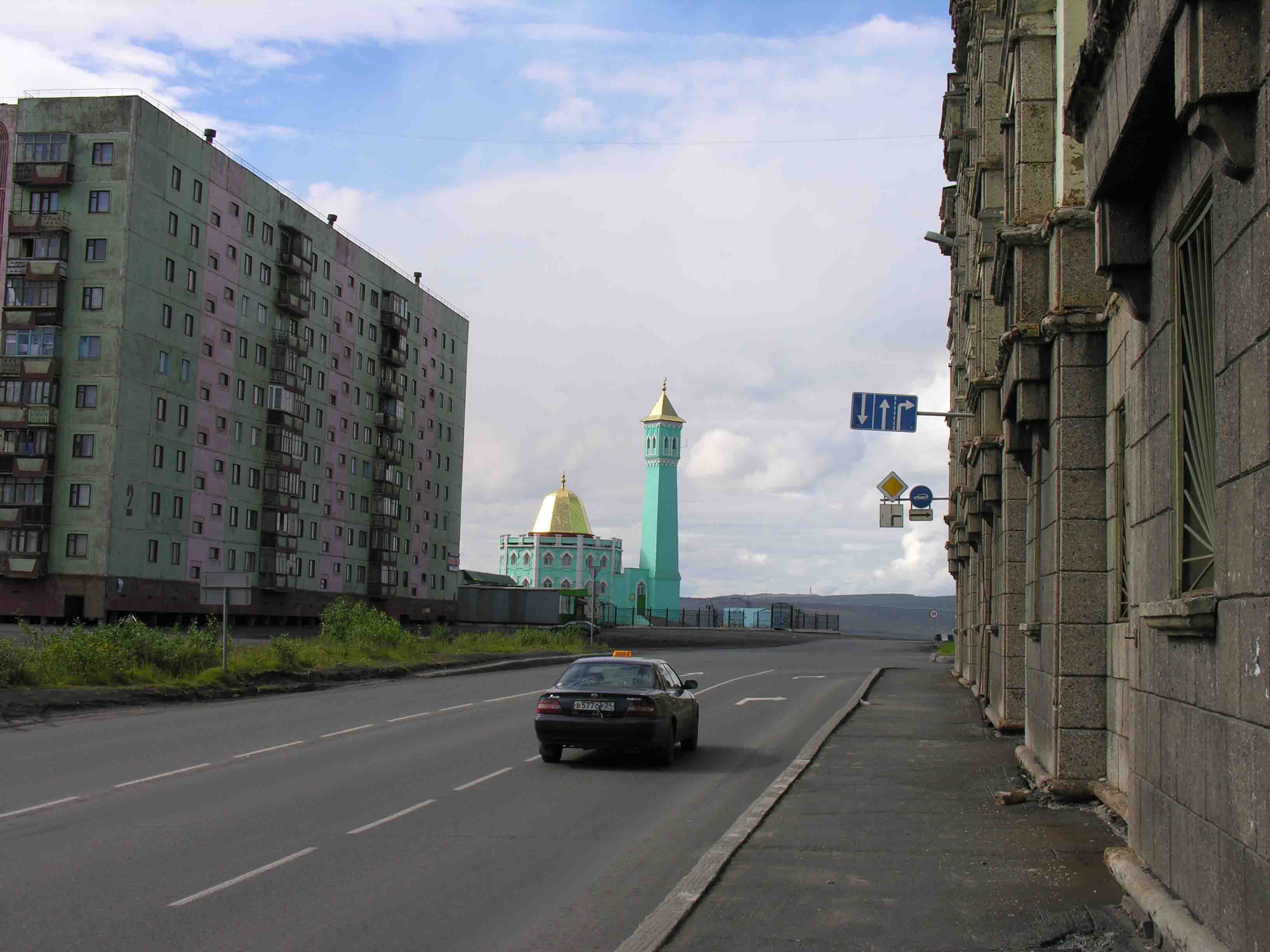
Streets of Norilsk

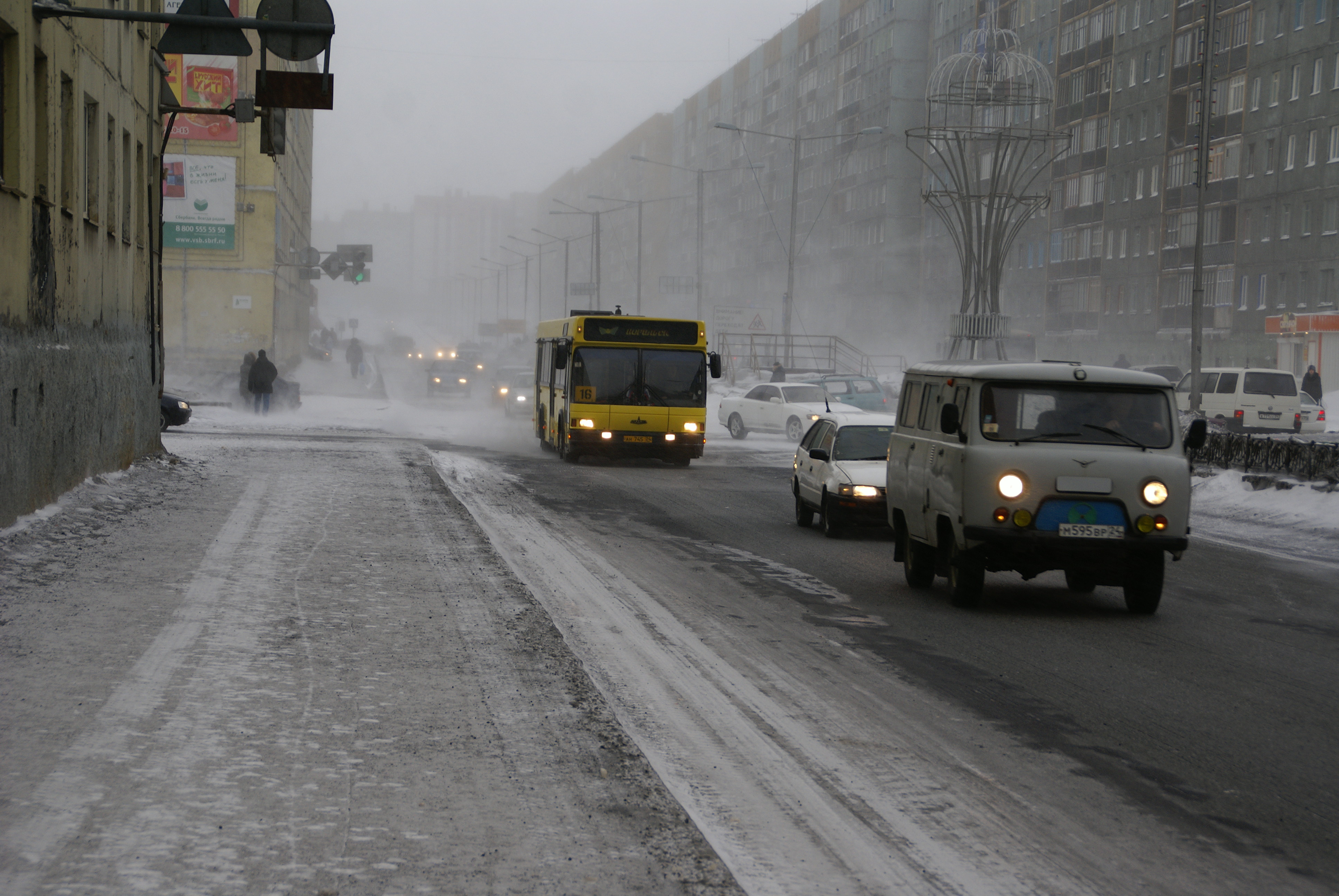
Public bus transport route No. 16

The city is served by Alykel Airport and Valek Airport. The Norilsk railway links Norilsk to the port of Dudinka on the Yenisei River, but has been freight-only since 1998.

There is a road network around Norilsk (such as the A-382 which links to Dudinka and Norilsk Alykel Airport), but the city is not connected to the rest of Russia by road or rail. In practical terms, Norilsk and Dudinka are isolated from the main Russian overland road and rail network. As there is no overland communication with the "Big Land", groups of enthusiasts make road trips to Norilsk in off-road vehicles from other cities in Russia.

Freight is transported to and from Norilsk via Dudinka by boat on the Arctic Ocean or on the Yenisei. Dudinka is connected by sea with Arkhangelsk and Murmansk year-round, and by river with Krasnoyarsk and Dikson during the summer navigation period.

Norilsk has a municipal bus network, and there is also a bus service to Dudinka. Several dozen taxi firms operate in the city. In bad weather, workers from Norilsk Nickel's industrial enterprises, which are located outside the city, are transported to and from the sites in off-road vehicles.

=== Norilsk Airport ===
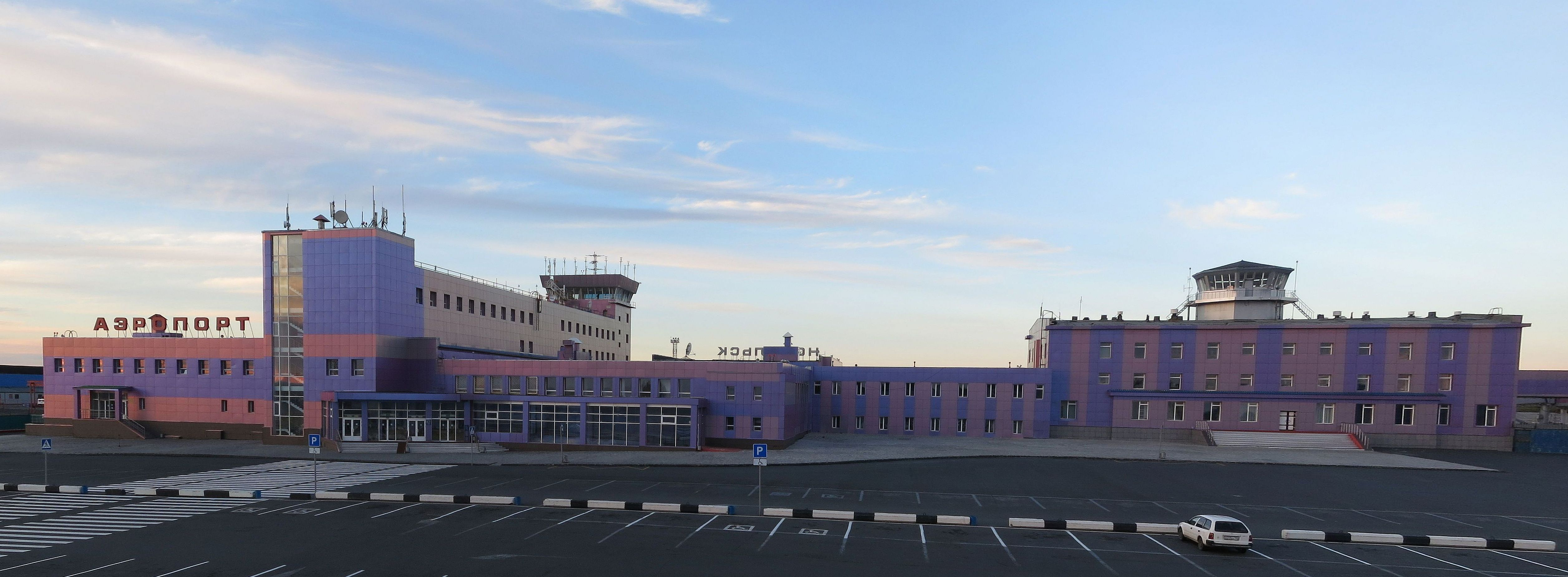
Norilsk Airport

Norilsk (Alykel) airport is located 35 kilometers west of the city center. Large-scale reconstruction in 2005-2008 upgraded the passenger terminal building to a modern international standard. In 2016-2018, a large-scale project was carried out to upgrade the airport's runway. This has made it possible to increase the airport's capacity, offer more flights and increase air safety.

In the summer of 2020, reconstruction work began on the airport as part of a state program to develop Russia's transport network. Total investment amounts to more than 12.5 billion rubles (of which 5.8 billion rubles has been invested by Norilsk Nickel).

The vehicle license plate code for Norilsk is 24 RUS and 124 RUS.

== Communication ==
Norilsk has a six-digit telephone numbering plan. All districts of the city are connected by a single telephone network.

Fixed-line communications for the population and organizations are provided by MTS, Norilsk Telecom, NN-Infocom, and Rostelecom.

Cellular communication began to develop relatively late in Norilsk: the first operator, Yeniseitelecom, began offering services only in December 2001. There are currently four mobile operators in the city: Yeniseitelecom (since 2001; since 2012 - under the Rostelecom brand; since July 31, 2015 - Tele2 Russia), Beeline (since 2002), MTS (since 2003) and MegaFon (since 2006). All of them, in addition to GSM communications, also provide third-generation services in the UMTS standards (Beeline, MTS and MegaFon, Tele2 Russia) and IMT-MC-450 (Tele2 Russia). Apart from MTS, all these mobile operators, built their own networks from scratch. MTS entered the Norilsk market as a result of the purchase of LLC Sibchallenge (the Taymyrsky Telefon (TT) brand) in 2003.

Since September 22, 2017, communication with the "mainland" has been carried out via fiber optic transmission; before that, communication could only be carried out via satellite channels; there were no cable lines connecting Norilsk with other cities.

A characteristic feature of Norilsk's cable network is the presence of communication cables in sewage pipes (on the surface); on the "mainland" the cables are laid in a cable duct.

Norilsk's troposcatter communication station was dismantled in the first half of the 2000s.

Since 2017, internet connection speeds have improved due to the installation of a 957-km (595 mi) communications cable laid along the Yenisei River toward Krasnoyarsk.

On June 3, 2019, the city switched to digital television, and most TV channels stopped broadcasting using an analogue signal.

=== Fiber optic communication ===
Until 2017, Norilsk was the last major city in Russia without high-speed internet access - access to the network was provided by a satellite channel with a speed of only 1 GB/s. The laying of a fiber optic line was complicated by the long distance (956 km) and severe weather conditions (up to −60 degrees in winter). The country's "big three" telecom operators did not dare to undertake the project, which was instead handled by the Norilsk Nickel subsidiary Unity. Broadband internet was launched in the city in September 2017. The launch was attended by Minister of Telecom and Mass Communications Nikolay Nikiforov and President of Norilsk Nickel Vladimir Potanin. Connectivity is now 40 times faster - up to 40 GB/s. The construction of the fiber optic line cost Norilsk Nickel 2.5 billion rubles, an investment that will not pay off, according to Russian business daily Vedomosti.

== Education ==
Norilsk has a number of higher education institutions:

- Fedorovsky Polar State University
- Zabaikalsky State University Polytechnic College
- Norilsk College of Arts
- Norilsk Pedagogical College
- Norilsk Medical College
- Norilsk College of Industrial Technologies and Service

There are also several branches of higher educational institutions based in other Russian cities.

The city has 80 institutions in the general education system: 38 pre-school educational and 29 secondary schools, six preparatory schools, one lyceum, and six further education institutions (the Station for Young Technicians, the Center for Extracurricular Activities, the House of Children's Creativity, the Social and Educational Center, the Station for Children's and Youth Tourism and Excursions, and the Palace of Creativity for Children and Youth).

There are 41 municipal budgetary autonomous preschool educational institutions in Norilsk, including the Child Development Center. Ten of the city's general education institutions offer specialized professional development classes.

== Culture ==
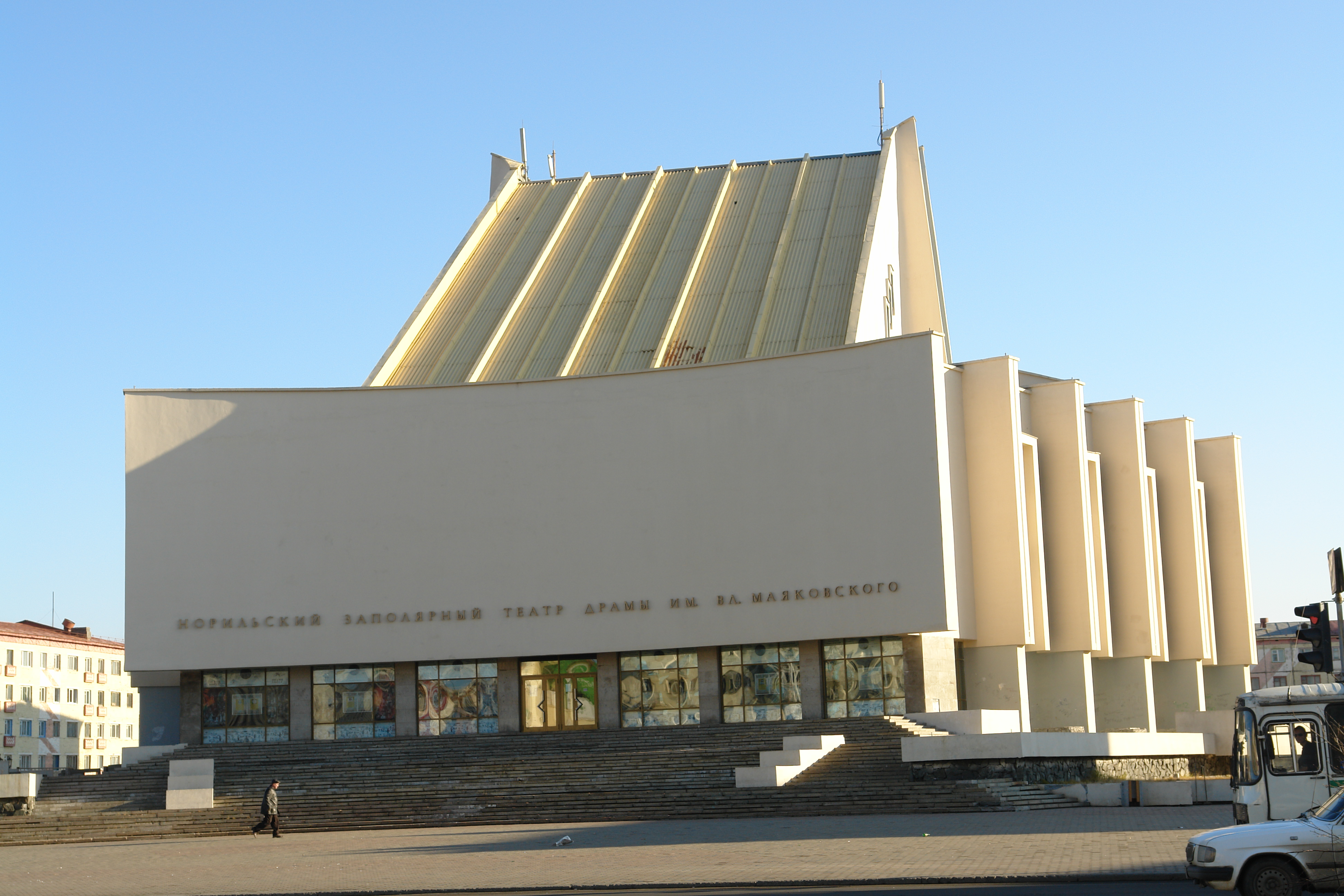
Norilsk Polar Drama Theater

Norilsk has a wide range of cultural institutions, including the Norilsk Museum and exhibition complex (which includes an art gallery and the "First House of Norilsk" house-museum), the Norilsk Municipal Cultural Center, the Norilsk Polar Drama Theater, the Norilsk Youth Theater & Studio, cinemas, a sports and entertainment complex, a music school, and art schools for children and adults, as well as many monuments and historical buildings.

The Norilsk Polar Drama Theater is one of the world's northernmost theaters. Founded in 1941 in Norillag, the troupe originally consisted mainly of prisoners. Artists such as Georgiy Zhzhonov (1949-1953, after imprisonment), E. Urusova (1950-1954, after imprisonment), Innokenty Smoktunovsky (1946-1951), V. Lukyanov, and V. Abramitskaya, E. Mokienko, A. Shcheglov, and I. Rozovsky all performed in the Norilsk Drama Theater at one time. From 1954-1962, Honored Artist of the RSFSR Efim Gelfand was the chief director of the theater. The theater also collaborated with Grigory Gorin and Yuli Kim, whose musical How the Soldier Ivan Chonkin Guarded the Plane, based on Vladimir Voinovich's novel The Life and Extraordinary Adventures of Private Ivan Chonkin, was staged in Norilsk for the first time and awarded the Golden Ostap Prize at a satire and humor festival in St. Petersburg (1997). In 2009, the Norilsk Polar Drama Theater was classified as a cultural heritage site of special value in the Krasnoyarsk Territory.

The city hosts several annual major cultural and entertainment festivals, such as the Bolshoi Argish festival, the Land is Our Common Home festival, and others.

Norilsk's library system has been recognized as the best in the Krasnoyarsk Territory. Libraries are found in every district of the city.

Exhibitions, concerts, creative gatherings, performances by local groups and touring artists regularly take place at the museum and exhibition complex, the Norilsk Municipal Cultural Center, and other cultural and leisure centers in the city.

As in other cities built around metallurgical enterprises, Metallurgist's Day (July 17) is an important festival. Members of indigenous northern ethnicities (Nenets, Dolgans, etc.) celebrate the festival of Heiro, which marks the return of the sun to the sky after the polar night.

In June 2021, Norilsk Nickel announced a RUB 4 billion project to create an Arctic Museum of Contemporary Art (AMMA), which includes the reconstruction of the House of Trade building and the opening of an 8,500-square-meter museum.

== Architecture ==
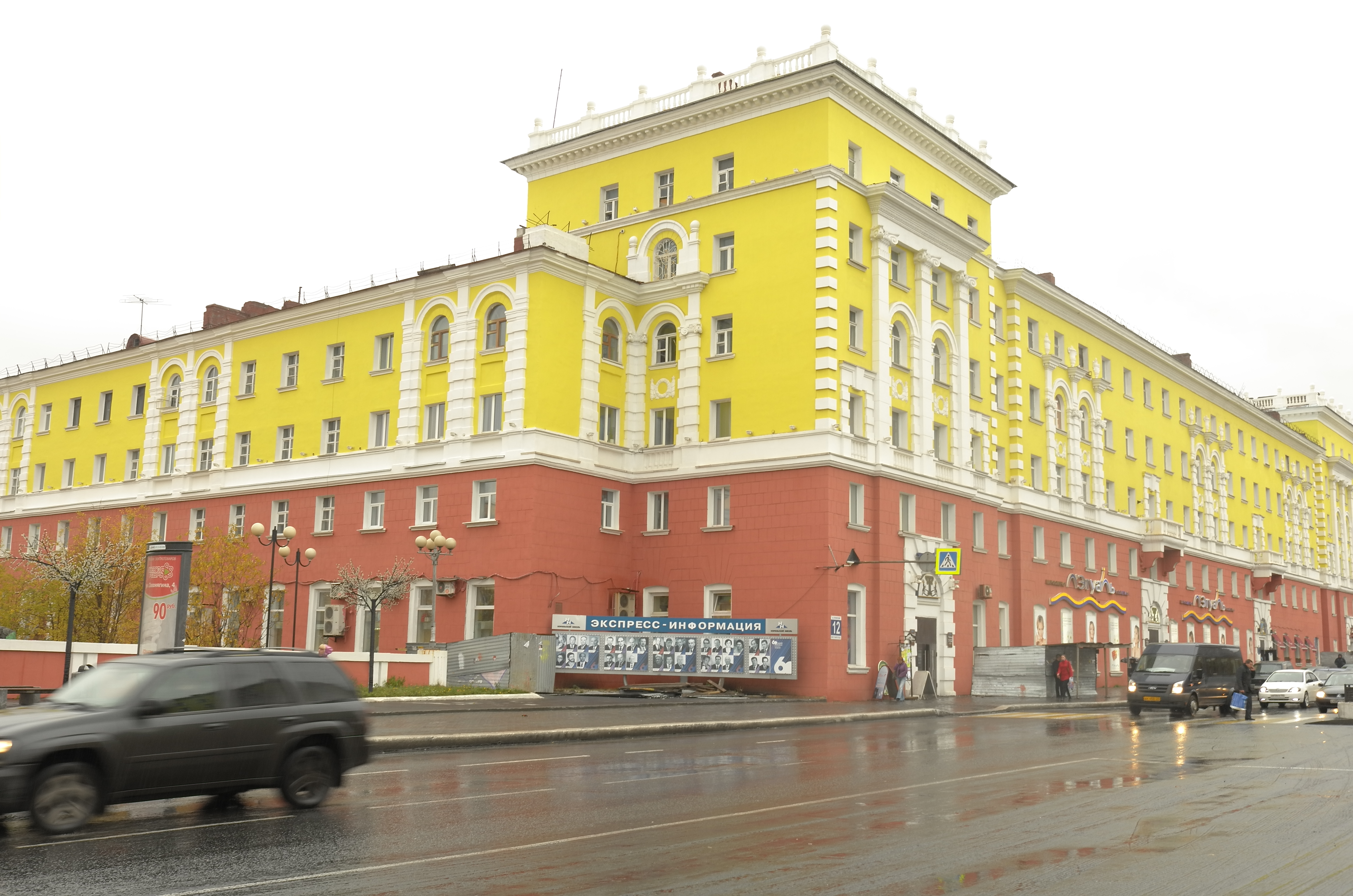
Residential building on Leninsky Prospekt in Norilsk with premises for social and cultural institutions on the lower floors, built in the 1950s

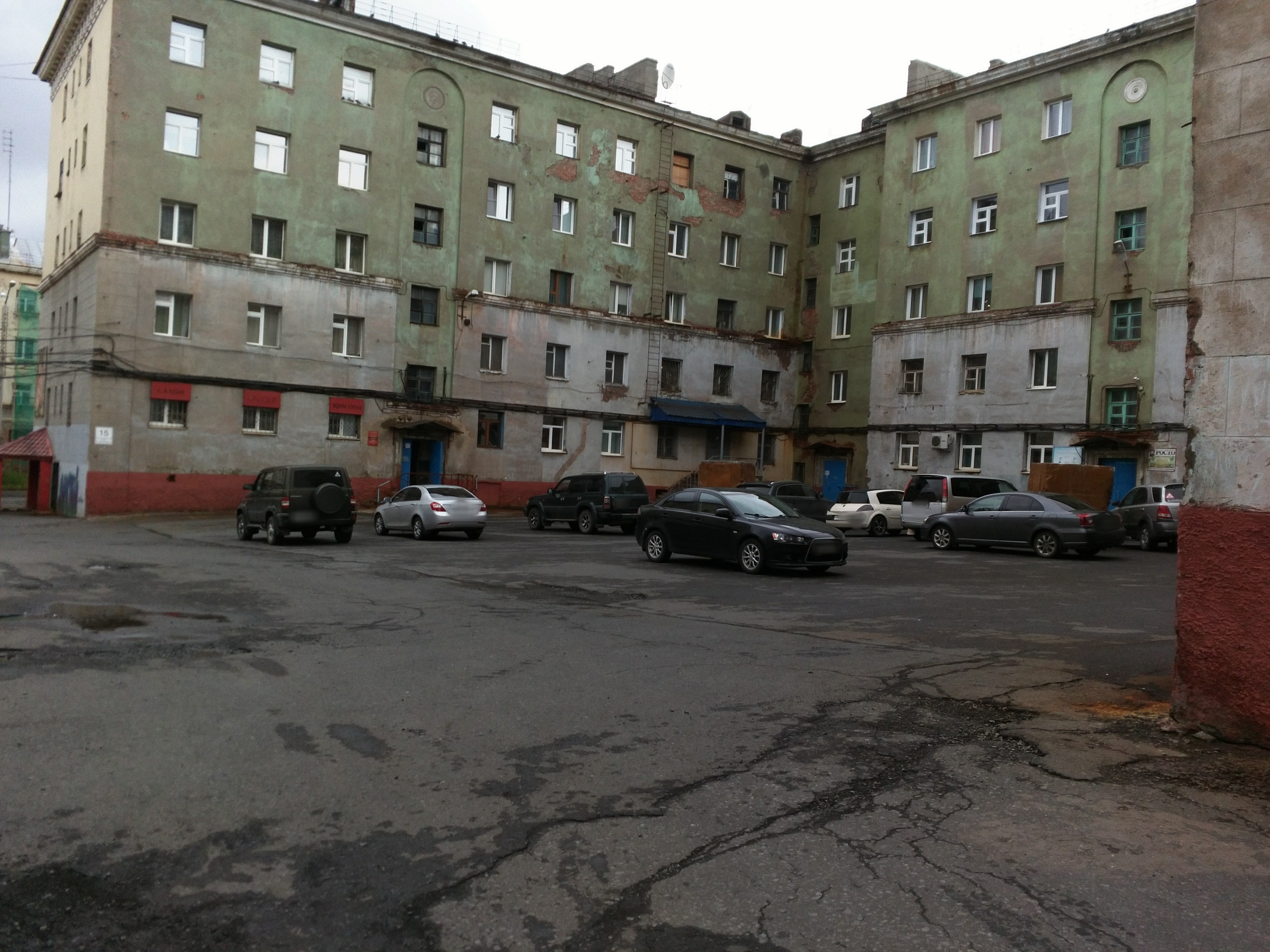
Apartment buildings in Norilsk

The head of the Norilsk camps, Avraami Zavenyagin, was made responsible for restructuring the camp barracks into a full-fledged city. The architects - Gevorg Kochar, Mikael Mazmanyan, Olgerd Trushinsh - were prisoners of Norillag. They were supervised by Vitold Nepokoichitsky, who arrived from Leningrad in 1939, so the first blocks to be constructed in the city were built in the neoclassical style and resemble St. Petersburg. Nepokoichitsky's wife, Lydia Minenko, also made a notable contribution. Local features such as Lake Dolgoye and reservoirs in the southwestern district were taken into account in the masterplan. The layout of the city was based on a main avenue, interrupted in places by squares.

One of the main challenges was to minimize the impact of strong winds. The first solutions were unsuccessful (it was initially assumed that snow would be swept out along the city's streets, which were specially laid out along the axes of the prevailing winds, but the winds turned out to be too strong, and there was too much snow). After that, the decision was taken to use compact perimeter blocks, which determined the appearance of the city.

In the 1960s, districts of standardized panel housing were built in the outskirts of Norilsk.

The city is unusual in that its gas and water pipes, which are typically laid underground elsewhere, run overground. This is due to the problems created by the seasonal melting and freezing of the top layer of permafrost.

The city center is dominated by buildings in neoclassical style, with outlying residential areas consisting of tower blocks.

=== Effects of thawing permafrost ===
Rising Arctic temperatures have been linked with thawing permafrost, which may cause infrastructure issues such as cracked foundations and increased building instability in the city. In response, regional authorities have announced a 650-million-ruble (€7.9 million) thermal stabilisation program for 10 Norilsk apartment buildings whose foundations are under threat.

The system consists of a network of pipes through which refrigerant circulates, helping to freeze the foundations in the ground. Soil cooling systems were installed alongside two buildings in 2019 and 2020, and the thermal stabilisation program is scheduled to be completed in 2024.

== Media ==
=== Television ===
The Norilsk Television Station broadcasts the signal from Russia's First and Second Digital Multiplexes in the DVB-T2 format.

On November 16, 2020, the city launched Norilsk TV, its first municipal round-the-clock channel, broadcast by local cable operators MTS and Norсom under number 24. Another local channel, Severny Gorod Norilsk ("The Northern City of Norilsk") presents its news broadcasts on the Klyuch channel several times a day. Until August 2019, news was produced and broadcast by the GTRK Norilsk Television and Radio Company, a division of VGTRK that was subsequently closed due to reorganization.

=== Radio stations ===
- 72.68 MHz — Radio Mayak (silent)
- 87.5 MHz — Radio Mayak
- 87.9 MHz — Radio Rossii / GTRK Krasnoyarsk (Kayerkan)
- 90.3 MHz — Vesti FМ
- 91.1 MHz — Nashe Radio
- 91.5 MHz — Novoye Radio
- 101.0 MHz — Hit FM
- 101.4 MHz — Radio Rossii / GTRK Krasnoyarsk
- 102.0 MHz — Love Radio
- 102.5 MHz — Dorozhnoye Radio
- 103.0 MHz — Delta Radio
- 103.5 MHz — Megapolis FM
- 104.0 MHz — Russkoye Radio
- 104.5 MHz — Radio Iskatel
- 105.0 MHz — Europa Plus
- 105.7 MHz — Radio ENERGY
- 106.0 MHz — AvtoRadio
- 106.5 MHz — Radio Dacha
- 107.0 MHz — Radio Shanson
- 107.4 MHz — Radio Vera
- 107.8 MHz — Retro FM

=== Print publications ===
Norilsk's city newspaper, Zapolyarnaya Pravda, was founded in 1953. Since then, the newspaper has been a source of relevant information on the city's day-to-day life, the operation of its enterprises and organizations, and its residents' lives.

Apart from Zapolyarnaya Pravda, the local print-based press consists of free papers containing adverts and commercial information.

== Healthcare ==
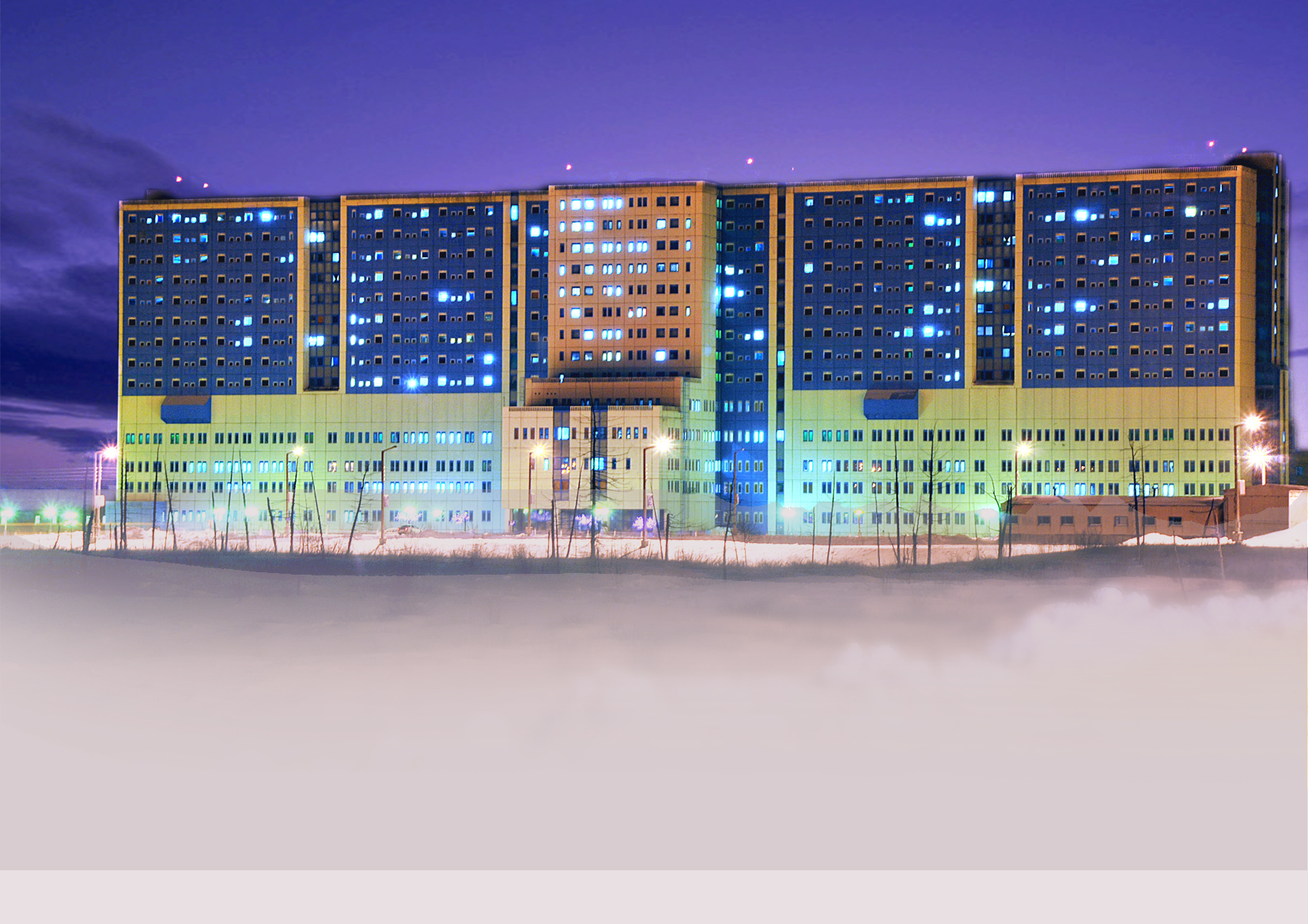
Municipal Hospital No. 1

Norilsk's residents enjoy a full range of public healthcare services offered by institutions that report to the Ministry of Healthcare of the Krasnoyarsk Territory. All city districts have outpatient clinics for children and adults, emergency rooms, and dentist clinics. An inter-district children's hospital is also available. The city operates a blood center.

The healthcare sector also features a broad range of private institutions offering a variety of services.

Norilsk's largest hospital is the general city hospital (KGBUZ Norilsk Interdistrict Hospital No. 1), located in the Oganer residential area.

In December 2018, Norilsk completed the construction of a maternity center.

December 2021 saw the inauguration of the first of five healthcare centers Nornickel had promised to build. The remaining four are expected to start operating before 2025.

== Sport ==
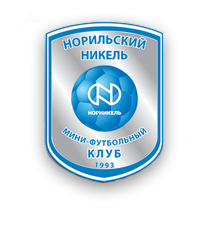
The logo of MFK Norilsk Nickel, Norilsk's futsal club

The city has a futsal club, MFK Norilsk Nickel, which competes in the Super League. Founded in 1993, the club's current president is Pavel Belkin. Norilsk Nickel won the Russian championship in the 2001/2002 and made it to the Russian Cup finals in 1999/2000, 2014/15, and 2017/18, eventually winning the trophy in 2019/20. In 2020/2021, the team came third in the Russian championship.

In 2023, a professional ice hockey club HC Norilsk was founded in the city. They compete in the second-tier All-Russian Hockey League.

In 2021, Norilsk hosted a basketball match between a representative team from the Norilsk division and PBC CSKA Moscow.

The city's range of sports amenities includes the Arktika multidisciplinary sports palace; swimming pools in the Central District, Talnakh, and Kayerkan; the Zapolyarnik outdoor stadium; the BOKMO sports complex; the House of Physical Education in the city center; the Ldinka indoor skating rink; and the Solnyshko stadium. For winter sports Norilsk has the Ol-Gul professional skiing center, the Oganer ski lodge, and the Gora Otdelnaya ski resort. In the summer, suburban tourist centers offer outdoor sports facilities for children and grown-ups. The city also has a junior sports academy.

In 2006, construction work began on a multi-purpose stadium in Metallurgov Square. It was later transformed into the Arena Norilsk shopping mall, which opened its doors in December 2013. In September 2015, the shopping mall welcomed visitors to the new X-Fit-Sever fitness center and the Tropicana water park and swimming pool.

Norilsk has nine municipal extracurricular sports centers, where schoolchildren can choose from a variety of sports and activities: basketball, volleyball, acrobatics, gymnastics, trampoline, track and field, cross-country skiing, fencing, boxing, wrestling, swimming, taekwondo, judo, weightlifting, karate, futsal, figure skating, hockey, and water polo.

Another popular local sport is curling. Norilsk and Dudinka host the international WCT Arctic Cup, which features teams from Hungary, Italy, Sweden, Switzerland, and Estonia. The championship is supported by the Russian Curling Federation and Nornickel.

On December 17, 2020, Nornickel announced the opening of Aika, a sports center of over 10,000 square meters. The company has invested 3.6 billion rubles into its construction.

== Social initiatives ==
In 2021, the Russian government, the Krasnoyarsk Territory, Norilsk and Norilsk Nickel approved a series of projects for the development of the city through to 2035 with a budget of 120.1 billion rubles (24 billion from the treasury, 14.8 billion from the budget of the Krasnoyarsk Territory, 81.3 billion from Norilsk Nickel's funds). Projects include renovation of the housing stock, repairs to infrastructure, and the relocation of residents to areas with more favorable living conditions. As of January 1, 2021, 8,064 families from Norilsk and Dudinka had purchased apartments and moved to the "mainland".

== Notable people ==
People born in Norilsk:

- Vakha Albakov (born 1985), footballer
- Ahmed Anarbayev (born 1948), swimmer
- Alexander Auzan (born 1954), economist
- Andrey Bartenev (born 1965), artist
- Vladimir Bure (1950-2024), swimmer
- Mikhail Chachba (1930-1967), diver
- Oksana Cherkasova (born 1951), animator
- Oleksandr Glotov (born 1953), Ukrainian journalist
- Leonid Ilyichov (born 1948), swimmer
- Vladislav Karapuzov (born 2000), footballer
- Evgeny Malko (born 1970), dancer
- Mikhail Popkov (born 1964), prolific serial killer
- Yuriy Prodan (born 1959), politician
- Viktor Semchenkov (born 1942), swimmer
- Alexander Shikov (1948-2013), materials scientist
- Sergey Smagin (born 1958), chess grandmaster
- Evgeny Solovyov (born 1992), ice hockey player
- Nadezhda Tolokonnikova, political activist and member of Pussy Riot
- Viktor Tomenko (born 1971), statesman
- Dmitri Torbinski (born 1984), footballer
- Andrey Tveryankin (born 1967), Azerbaijani futsal player
- Natalia Yurchenko (born 1965), gymnast
- Ivan V. Zaitsev (born 1975), Russian-born Kazakhstani water polo player

== Twin cities ==
Norilsk is twinned with two other cities:

- (Russia) Minusinsk, Krasnoyarsk Territory
- Nesebar, Bulgaria

== See also ==
- Colony
- Human outpost
- Mill town
- Talnakh ore field
- Tunguska Basin
