= Vakha =

Vakha is a masculine given name. Notable people with the name include:

- Vakha Agaev (1953–2020), Russian politician
- Vakha Albakov (born 1985), Russian football coach and player
- Vakha Arsanov (1958–2005), Chechen general and politician
