= Talnakh ore field =

The Talnakh ore field is a large ore field in the north of Russia near Norilsk in the Krasnoyarsk Krai. Talnakh represents one of the largest nickel reserve in Russia having estimated reserves of 1.38 billion tonnes of ore grading 0.57% nickel. The 281 million tonnes of ore contains 7.8 million tonnes of nickel metal.
