= Kayerkan =

Kayerkan Кайерка́н
- City
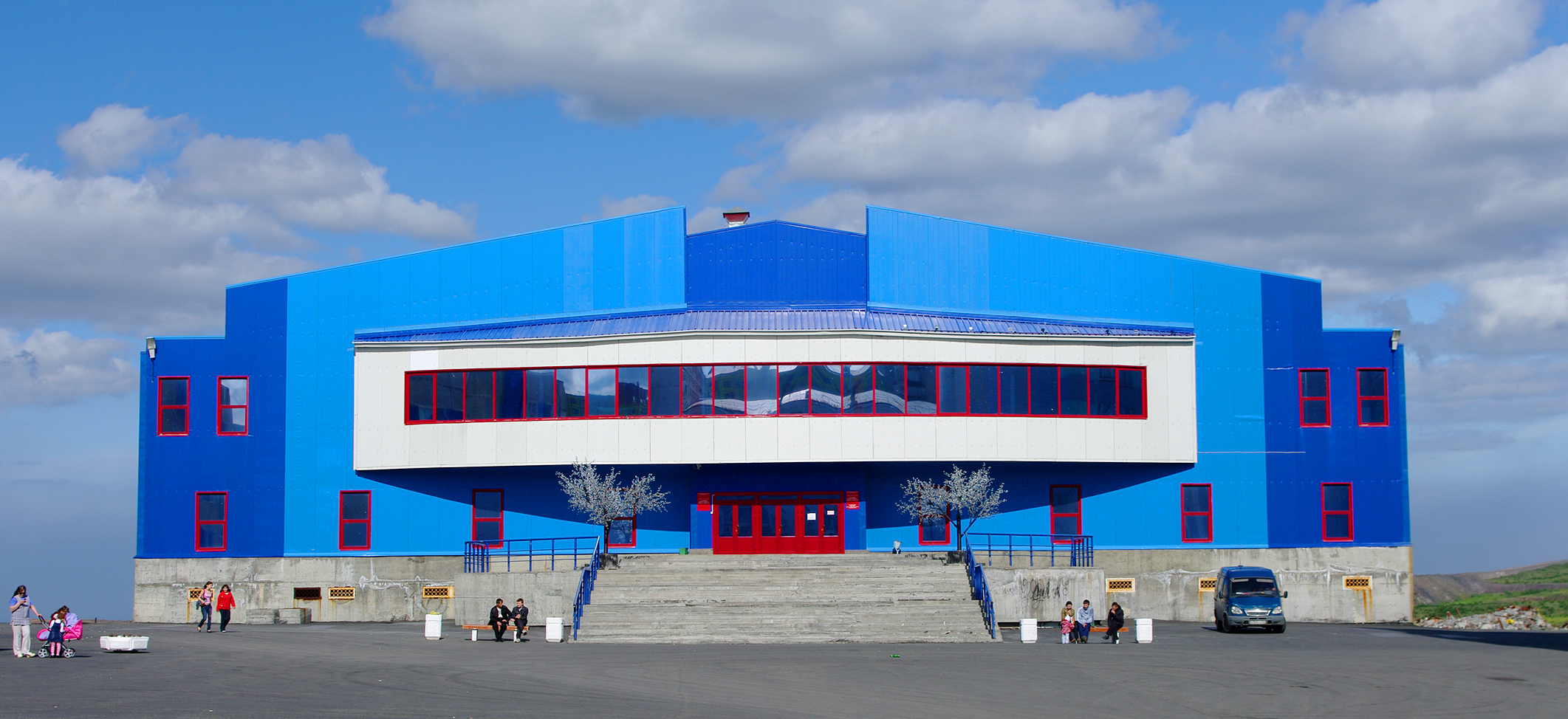
- Ice Sports Palace in Kayerkan

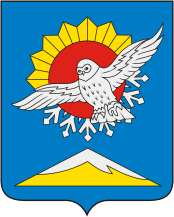
- Coat of arms
- Interactive map of Kayerkan
- Location of Kayerkan Kayerkan (Krasnoyarsk Krai)
- Coordinates: 69°22′N 87°44′E
- Country: Russia
- Federal subject: Krasnoyarsk Krai
- Founded: 1943

Population (2010 Census)
  - Total: 27,116
  - Estimate (2022): 21,665 (−20.1%)

Administrative status
  - Subordinated to: krai city of Norilsk
  - Capital of: krai city of Norilsk

Municipal status
  - Urban okrug: Norilsk Urban Okrug
  - Capital of: Norilsk Urban Okrug
- Postal codes: 663340, 663341
- Website: www.norilsk-city.ru

Kayerkan (Russian: Кайерка́н), located in the northern part of Krasnoyarsk Krai, Russia and in the southern part of the Taymyr Peninsula, is a town under jurisdiction of Norilsk in 1982–2005. In 2005, the town was incorporated into Norilsk, even though it is located 20 km away from its center. Population: 27,116 (2002 Census); 27,881 (1989 Census).

== History ==
The settlement of Kayerkan was established in 1943 in relation with coal mining in the area. It was granted status of work settlement in 1957, and that of a town in 1982.

== Population ==
Historical population
| Year | Pop. | ±% |
|---|---|---|
| 1959 | 5,167 | — |
| 1970 | 4,748 | −8.1% |
| 1979 | 18,013 | +279.4% |
| 1989 | 27,881 | +54.8% |
| 2002 | 27,116 | −2.7% |
| 2010 | 22,338 | −17.6% |
| 2021 | 21,193 | −5.1% |
Source: Censuses
