= Alexander Shikov =

Russian scientist

Alexander Shikov, D. Sc. (Russian: Александр Шиков; 1948–2013) was a Russian materials scientist.

Dr. Shikov was a leading scientist in the field of applied superconductivity. He developed a large-scale production of niobium-tin (Nb3Sn) and niobium-titanium (NbTi) based superconductors. These superconducting materials are used for many applications including MRI, telecommunications systems and research. The magnets of the International Thermonuclear Experimental Reactor (ITER) will feature superconductors developed under Dr. Shikov's leadership.

== Biography ==
Alexander Konstantinovich Shikov was born in Norilsk in 1948. He graduated from the Moscow Institute of Steel and Alloys MISIS (Moscow, then USSR) in 1971. He started his scientific career as a junior research associate at VNIINM in 1971. He received his D.Sc. degree in 1991. Since 1998, Dr. Shikov has served as the deputy director of Bochvar Institute. Shikov served as the head of the Bochvar institute from March to August 2009. In 2009, Dr. Shikov was appointed as an executive director of Kurchatov Institute's center for Nano-Bio-Info-Cognitive (NBIC) science and technology.

== Awards and honors ==
Dr. Shikov was the laureate of the government awards in the field of science and engineering, government award in the field of science, award of the Russian Academy of Sciences, the gold and silver medals of the International Exhibition of Inventions, member of the Academy of Electrotechnical Sciences of the Russian Federation. Dr. Shikov has received an International Cryogenic Materials Conference Best Paper Award at the meeting in Tucson, Arizona in July 2009.
