= Vakha Albakov =

Russian footballer

Personal information
- Full name: Vakha Akhmetovich Albakov
- Date of birth: 17 January 1985 (age 41)
- Place of birth: Norilsk, Krasnoyarsk Krai, Russian SFSR
- Height: 1.85 m (6 ft 1 in)
- Positions: Midfielder; defender

Senior career*
Years	Team	Apps	(Gls)
2005	FC Nara-Desna Naro-Fominsk	8	(0)
2005	FC Yelets	7	(0)
2006	FC Angusht Nazran	19	(0)
2007–2008	FC Spartak Shchyolkovo	19	(0)
2008	FC Dmitrov	20	(0)
2009–2014	FC Angusht Nazran	134	(3)

Managerial career
- 2018: FSK Dolgoprudny (assistant)
- * Club domestic league appearances and goals

Vakha Akhmetovich Albakov (Russian: Ваха Ахметович Албаков; born 17 January 1985) is a Russian professional football coach and a former player.

== Club career ==
He played two seasons in the Russian Football National League for FC Angusht Nazran.
