= LTIFR =

Measure of occupational safety

LTIFR (lost time injury frequency rate) is the number of lost time injuries occurring in a workplace per 1 million hours worked. An LTIFR of 7, for example, shows that 7 lost time injuries occur on a jobsite every 1 million hours worked. The formula gives a picture of how safe a workplace is for its workers.

Lost time injuries (LTI) include all on-the-job injuries that require a person to stay away from work more than 24 hours or which result in death or permanent disability. This definition comes from the Australian standard 1885.1– 1990 Workplace Injury and Disease Recording Standard.
