= Oleksandr Glotov =

Ukrainian literary historian, journalist

- Олександр Глотов
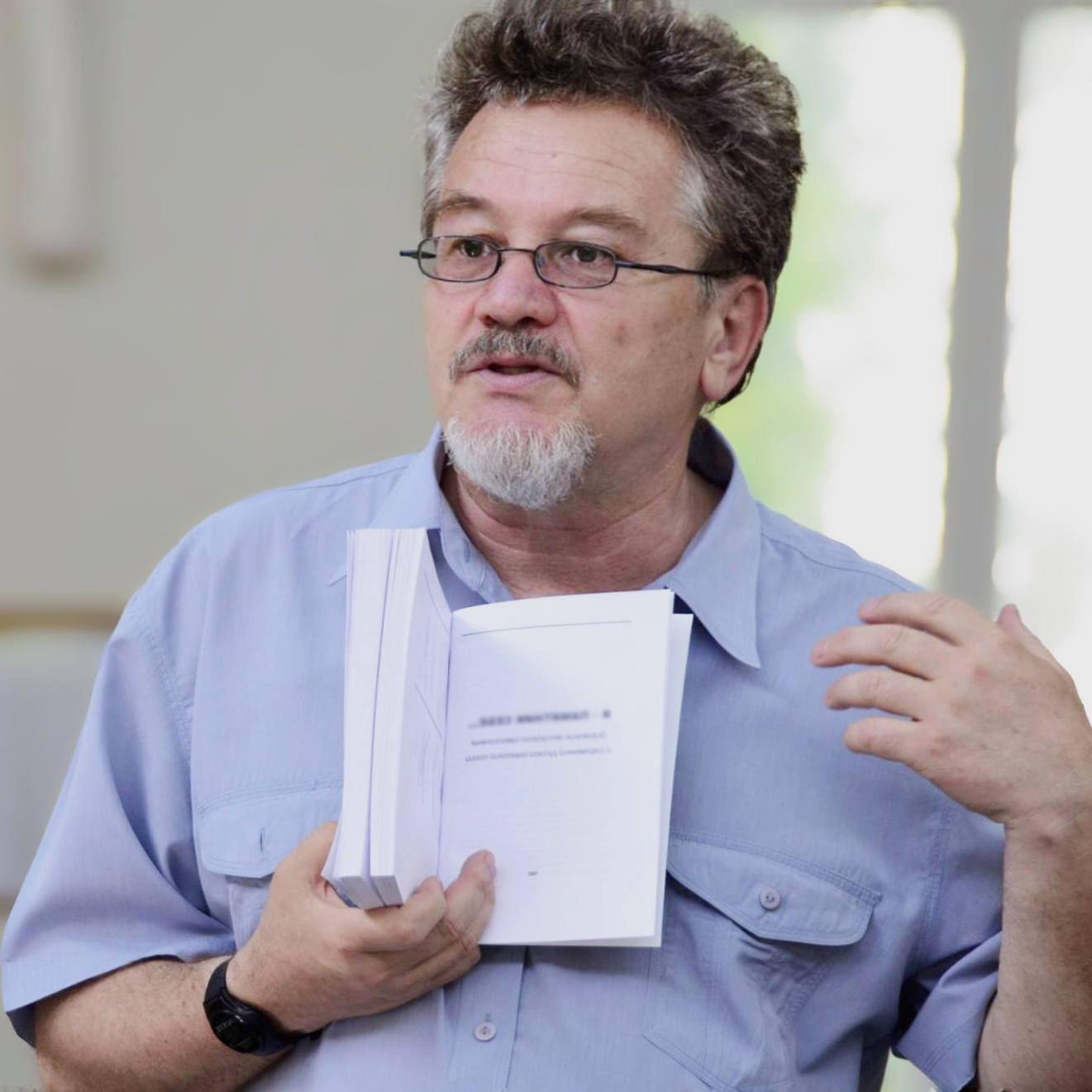
- Born: 10 November 1953 (age 72); Norilsk, Krasnoyarsk Krai, USSR
- Citizenship: USSR, Ukraine
- Education: Lviv University (Ivan Franko National University of Lviv)
- Awards: a non-government award – “For building up the education”
- Scientific career
- Fields: philology, literary criticism, journalism
- Workplaces: Regional Humanitarian and Pedagogical Academy of Taras Shevchenko in Kremenets
- Thesis: Russian literature of the 20th century in the context of cult consciousness (The attempt of historical-functional analysis) (1997)

Oleksandr Glotov (born 10 November 1953 in Norilsk, Krasnoyarsk Krai, Russian Federation) is a Ukrainian literary historian, journalist, member of the Ukraine's National Union of Journalists (from 1992), Doctor of Philological Sciences, and professor.

== Biography ==
Oleksandr was born on 10 November 1953 in Norilsk village (Norillag), which acquired the status of city in 1953. His parents, Glotov Leonid (1932–2012) and Glotova (Kudelina) Kapitolina (1932), worked there after finishing Vorkuta mining technical school.

Oleksandr finished middle school in Chervonohrad, Lviv oblast. He worked in the “4th Velykomostivska” mine of the Lviv-Volyn’ coal basin industrial complex “Ukrzahidvugillia”, and served in the Soviet Army.

In 1979 he graduated from Ivan Franko Lviv State University of Lenin Order receiving the diploma with honors with speciality “Philologist. Lecturer of Russian language and literature”. Until 1981 he worked as a teacher in the middle school #1 in Sokal, Lviv oblast, and after that he took the position of the assistant professor at the Russian literature department in Lviv University. In 1985 he finished his postgraduate studies and based on the assignment he filled a position of the assistant professor at the Russian literature department in Iaroslav Galan Ternopil State Pedagogical Institute.

In 1994 Oleksandr graduated from postgraduate department of Humanities in Tadeusz Kotarbiński Higher Pedagogical School in Zielona Góra (Poland) with the speciality “Polish Philology”. In 2015 he received master's degree with speciality “Journalism” in National University “Ostroh Academy”.

He also worked at Ternopil Academy of National Economy, Ternopil institute of Social and Informational Technologies, Ternopil Experimental Institute of Pedagogical Education, Bila Tserkva National Agrarian University, Hetman Petro Sahaidachny National Army Academy, National University “Ostroh Academy”, and since 2018 he has been working at Regional Humanitarian and Pedagogical Academy of Taras Shevchenko in Kremenets.

In 1988 Oleksandr defended his candidate thesis “Author's self-consciousness expression in modern Russian soviet poetry” (dissertation supervisor – professor of Lviv University Ivan Vyshnevskyi) with speciality 10.01.02 “soviet multinational literature” in Odesa I. I. Mechnikov State University. In this research the term “author's self-consciousness” in literary context was introduced into national literary science, viz. discovering how the author of literary work realizes himself and his work in his literary work, first of all – poetic. In 1992 he received a scientific title of docent.

In 1997 Oleksand defended his doctoral thesis “Russian literature of the XX century in the context of cult consciousness” based on the monograph “Izhe esi v Markse” with the speciality 10.01.02 – “Russian literature” in the Institute of literature of Taras Shevchenko Ukraine's National Academy of Science. In this research the concept of world-view and esthetic secondary nature of “soviet realism” literature quoad ideology and Christian canon texts is claimed. In 2002 he received the scientific title of professor.

For many years he has been a member of the editorial board in the international scientific anthology “Studia methodological”, and he has also participated in the work of scientific editions “Slavica Tarnopolensia”, “Ruski iazyk i literatura v uchebnyh zavedeniah”, “Naukovi zapysky Ternopilskogo natsionalnogo pedagogichnogo universytetu imeni Volodymyra Gnatiuka. Seria: Literaturoznavstvo”, “The Pectuliarity of Man”, “Vestnik Volgogradskogo gosudarstennogo universiteta. Seria 8. Literaturovedenie. Zhurnalistika”.

Oleksandr Glotov has received a non-government award – “For building up the education”.

== Scientific and publicistic publications ==
Oleksand is the author of scientific and popular scientific articles in the editions of USSR, Ukraine, Russia, Poland, Belarus, Israel, and in the electronic edition, in particular, in journals “Ruski pereplet” and “Lebed”.

=== Monographs and text books ===
- Izhe esi v Markse. Russian literature of the 20th century in the context of cult consciousness. – Zielona Góra, 1995. – 148p.;
- Eco Umberto. How to write a diploma thesis. The Humanities – Ternopil: “Mandrivets”, 2007. – 224p. (translation edition, introductory article);
- Reading circle: twentieth century. Biobibliographical reference book on the history of Russian literature of the 20th century of the after-revolutionary period. – Ternopil: “Navchalna knyga Bohdan”, 2011 – 160p.;
- Christian morals and military duty: Study guide. – Lviv:ACB, 2012. – 112p. (in co-authorship);
- The classics of world literature: Russian literature: in English: essays: study guide. – Ostroh: National University “Ostroh Academy” Press, 2012. – 152 p. (in co-authorship);
- Two epochs: monograpgh – Ostroh, 2015. – 376p.;
- Philological essays. – Ostrog, 2015. – 316p.;
- Philological essays. Book 2. – Ternopil, 2020. – 178p..

=== Criticism and columns ===
Oleksandr Glotov writes for periodicals as a literary critic and columnist:

- Chekhov and Maugham in the looking-glass of postmodernism. – 22 (magazine), Tel Aviv, #135;
- I want to tell you about…a poet. – Zerkalo nedeli, 30 May 1997;
- Mykola Ostrovsky or prince Ostrovsky? About the role of historical figures in the formation of the state thinking buds. – Day, 14 November 2014.
- Peer of Vysotsky. — ZN.UA, June 22, 2018;
- Tsylyurnyk or palikmahter: to whom we go to get a haircut? — Zbruč, September 1, 2020;
- "Terkin" in Lviv. — ZN.UA, December 26, 2020.

== Information in reference books ==
- Tkachov S., Khanas V. 250 names on the map of Ternopil region: Regional-ethnographical and biographical guide. – T., 1996.
- Ternopil encyclopedia. – Ternopil: 2004, v.1. – p. 365.
- Modern Ukraine Encyclopedia. – K., 2006, v.6.
- Encyclopedia. Ivan Franko Lviv National University: in 2 v. V.1: A-K. – Lviv: Ivan Franko LNU, 2011. – P.350-351.
