= Novy (inhabited locality) =

Novy (Russian: Но́вый; masculine), Novaya (Но́вая; feminine), or Novoye (Но́вое; neuter) is the name of several rural localities in Russia.

== Modern localities ==
=== Republic of Adygea ===
As of 2012, two rural localities in the Republic of Adygea bear this name:

- Novy, Giaginsky District, Republic of Adygea, a settlement in Giaginsky District; 44°56′N 40°11′E
- Novy, Takhtamukaysky District, Republic of Adygea, a settlement in Takhtamukaysky District; 45°1′N 38°59′E

=== Altai Krai ===
As of 2012, two rural localities in Altai Krai bear this name:

- Novy, Kalmansky District, Altai Krai, a settlement in Zimarevsky Selsoviet of Kalmansky District; 53°10′N 83°31′E
- Novy, Pervomaysky District, Altai Krai, a settlement in Berezovsky Selsoviet of Pervomaysky District; 53°23′N 83°59′E

=== Amur Oblast ===
As of 2012, one rural locality in Amur Oblast bears this name:

- Novoye, Amur Oblast, a selo in Novinsky Rural Settlement of Belogorsky District

=== Arkhangelsk Oblast ===
As of 2012, four rural localities in Arkhangelsk Oblast bear this name:

- Novy, Konoshsky District, Arkhangelsk Oblast, a settlement in Podyuzhsky Selsoviet of Konoshsky District
- Novy, Vinogradovsky District, Arkhangelsk Oblast, a settlement under the administrative jurisdiction of Bereznik Urban-Type Settlement with Jurisdictional Territory in Vinogradovsky District
- Novaya, Kholmogorsky District, Arkhangelsk Oblast, a village in Zachachyevsky Selsoviet of Kholmogorsky District
- Novaya, Nyandomsky District, Arkhangelsk Oblast, a settlement in Limsky Selsoviet of Nyandomsky District

=== Republic of Bashkortostan ===
As of 2012, three rural localities in the Republic of Bashkortostan bear this name:

- Novy, Iglinsky District, Republic of Bashkortostan, a village in Nadezhdinsky Selsoviet of Iglinsky District
- Novy, Yermekeyevsky District, Republic of Bashkortostan, a selo in Beketovsky Selsoviet of Yermekeyevsky District
- Novaya, Republic of Bashkortostan, a village in Arslanovsky Selsoviet of Chishminsky District

=== Belgorod Oblast ===
As of 2012, two rural localities in Belgorod Oblast bear this name:

- Novy, Belgorod Oblast, a settlement in Shidlovsky Rural Okrug of Volokonovsky District
- Novoye, Belgorod Oblast, a selo in Tishansky Rural Okrug of Volokonovsky District

=== Bryansk Oblast ===
As of 2012, one rural locality in Bryansk Oblast bears this name:

- Novoye, Bryansk Oblast, a village in Stolbovsky Rural Administrative Okrug of Brasovsky District; 52°35′N 34°51′E

=== Chelyabinsk Oblast ===
As of 2012, three rural localities in Chelyabinsk Oblast bear this name:

- Novy, Bredinsky District, Chelyabinsk Oblast, a settlement in Belokamensky Selsoviet of Bredinsky District
- Novy, Kizilsky District, Chelyabinsk Oblast, a settlement in Karabulaksky Selsoviet of Kizilsky District
- Novy, Krasnoarmeysky District, Chelyabinsk Oblast, a settlement in Lazurnensky Selsoviet of Krasnoarmeysky District

=== Chuvash Republic ===
As of 2012, two rural localities in the Chuvash Republic bear this name:

- Novy, Chuvash Republic, a settlement in Malobikshikhskoye Rural Settlement of Kanashsky District
- Novaya, Chuvash Republic, a village in Shumshevashskoye Rural Settlement of Alikovsky District

=== Republic of Dagestan ===
As of 2012, one rural locality in the Republic of Dagestan bears this name:

- Novoye, Republic of Dagestan, a selo in Kizlyarsky Selsoviet of Kizlyarsky District; 53°54′N 46°46′E

=== Ivanovo Oblast ===
As of 2012, five rural localities in Ivanovo Oblast bear this name:

- Novoye, Ivanovo Oblast, a selo in Privolzhsky District
- Novaya, Gavrilovo-Posadsky District, Ivanovo Oblast, a village in Gavrilovo-Posadsky District
- Novaya, Ivanovsky District, Ivanovo Oblast, a village in Ivanovsky District
- Novaya, Palekhsky District, Ivanovo Oblast, a village in Palekhsky District
- Novaya, Shuysky District, Ivanovo Oblast, a village in Shuysky District

=== Jewish Autonomous Oblast ===
As of 2012, two rural localities in the Jewish Autonomous Oblast bear this name:

- Novy, Jewish Autonomous Oblast, a selo in Obluchensky District
- Novoye, Jewish Autonomous Oblast, a selo in Leninsky District

=== Kaliningrad Oblast ===
As of 2012, two rural localities in Kaliningrad Oblast bear this name:

- Novy, Kaliningrad Oblast, a settlement in Kutuzovsky Rural Okrug of Guryevsky District
- Novoye, Kaliningrad Oblast, a settlement under the administrative jurisdiction of the Town of District Significance of Pravdinsk in Pravdinsky District

=== Republic of Kalmykia ===
As of 2012, three rural localities in the Republic of Kalmykia bear this name:

- Novy, Chernozemelsky District, Republic of Kalmykia, a settlement in Achinerovskaya Rural Administration of Chernozemelsky District; 45°30′N 45°32′E
- Novy, Ketchenerovsky District, Republic of Kalmykia, a settlement in Altsynkhutinskaya Rural Administration of Ketchenerovsky District; 46°59′N 45°5′E
- Novy, Sarpinsky District, Republic of Kalmykia, a settlement in Sharnutovskaya Rural Administration of Sarpinsky District; 47°47′N 44°2′E

=== Kaluga Oblast ===
As of 2012, four rural localities in Kaluga Oblast bear this name:

- Novy, Kaluga, Kaluga Oblast, a settlement under the administrative jurisdiction of the City of Kaluga
- Novy, Duminichsky District, Kaluga Oblast, a settlement in Duminichsky District
- Novaya, Kuybyshevsky District, Kaluga Oblast, a village in Kuybyshevsky District
- Novaya, Medynsky District, Kaluga Oblast, a village in Medynsky District

=== Kamchatka Krai ===
As of 2012, one rural locality in Kamchatka Krai bears this name:

- Novy, Kamchatka Krai, a settlement in Yelizovsky District

=== Karachay-Cherkess Republic ===
As of 2012, one rural locality in the Karachay-Cherkess Republic bears this name:

- Novy, Karachay-Cherkess Republic, a settlement in Prikubansky District; 44°16′N 42°33′E

=== Kemerovo Oblast ===
As of 2012, three rural localities in Kemerovo Oblast bear this name:

- Novy, Leninsk-Kuznetsky District, Kemerovo Oblast, a settlement in Chusovitinskaya Rural Territory of Leninsk-Kuznetsky District; 54°50′N 86°14′E
- Novy, Novokuznetsky District, Kemerovo Oblast, a settlement in Sosnovskaya Rural Territory of Novokuznetsky District; 53°42′N 87°3′E
- Novy, Tashtagolsky District, Kemerovo Oblast, a settlement in Ust-Kabyrzinskaya Rural Territory of Tashtagolsky District; 50°49′N 88°26′E

=== Kirov Oblast ===
As of 2012, four rural localities in Kirov Oblast bear this name:

- Novy, Murashinsky District, Kirov Oblast, a settlement in Bezbozhnikovsky Rural Okrug of Murashinsky District; 59°28′N 49°16′E
- Novy, Sanchursky District, Kirov Oblast, a pochinok in Matvinursky Rural Okrug of Sanchursky District; 57°3′N 47°25′E
- Novy, Sovetsky District, Kirov Oblast, a settlement in Rodyginsky Rural Okrug of Sovetsky District; 57°33′N 48°57′E
- Novy, Sunsky District, Kirov Oblast, a settlement in Bolshevistsky Rural Okrug of Sunsky District; 57°54′N 49°49′E

=== Kostroma Oblast ===
As of 2012, seven rural localities in Kostroma Oblast bear this name:

- Novy, Kostromskoy District, Kostroma Oblast, a settlement in Kuznetsovskoye Settlement of Kostromskoy District
- Novy, Ponazyrevsky District, Kostroma Oblast, a settlement in Poldnevitskoye Settlement of Ponazyrevsky District
- Novoye, Galichsky District, Kostroma Oblast, a village in Dmitriyevskoye Settlement of Galichsky District
- Novoye, Krasnoselsky District, Kostroma Oblast, a village in Chapayevskoye Settlement of Krasnoselsky District
- Novaya, Ostrovsky District, Kostroma Oblast, a village in Klevantsovskoye Settlement of Ostrovsky District
- Novaya, Susaninsky District, Kostroma Oblast, a village in Sumarokovskoye Settlement of Susaninsky District
- Novaya, Vokhomsky District, Kostroma Oblast, a village in Belkovskoye Settlement of Vokhomsky District

=== Krasnodar Krai ===
As of 2012, nine rural localities in Krasnodar Krai bear this name:

- Novy, Belorechensk, Krasnodar Krai, a settlement in Yuzhny Rural Okrug under the administrative jurisdiction of the Town of Belorechensk
- Novy, Krasnodar, Krasnodar Krai, a khutor in Berezovsky Rural Okrug under the administrative jurisdiction of Prikubansky Okrug under the administrative jurisdiction of the City of Krasnodar
- Novy, Abinsky District, Krasnodar Krai, a settlement in Kholmsky Rural Okrug of Abinsky District
- Novy, Dinskoy District, Krasnodar Krai, a khutor in Staromyshastovsky Rural Okrug of Dinskoy District
- Novy, Krymsky District, Krasnodar Krai, a khutor in Kiyevsky Rural Okrug of Krymsky District
- Novy, Pavlovsky District, Krasnodar Krai, a khutor in Pavlovsky Stanitsa Okrug of Pavlovsky District
- Novy, Seversky District, Krasnodar Krai, a khutor in Novodmitriyevsky Rural Okrug of Seversky District
- Novy, Novoleninsky Rural Okrug, Timashyovsky District, Krasnodar Krai, a khutor in Novoleninsky Rural Okrug of Timashyovsky District
- Novy, Poselkovy Rural Okrug, Timashyovsky District, Krasnodar Krai, a settlement in Poselkovy Rural Okrug of Timashyovsky District

=== Krasnoyarsk Krai ===
As of 2012, three rural localities in Krasnoyarsk Krai bear this name:

- Novy, Krasnoyarsk Krai, a settlement in Mikhaylovsky Selsoviet of Dzerzhinsky District
- Novaya, Rybinsky District, Krasnoyarsk Krai, a village in Novinsky Selsoviet of Rybinsky District
- Novaya, Taymyrsky Dolgano-Nenetsky District, Krasnoyarsk Krai, a settlement in Khatanga Inhabited Locality of Taymyrsky Dolgano-Nenetsky District

=== Leningrad Oblast ===
As of 2012, ten rural localities in Leningrad Oblast bear this name:

- Novy, Slantsevsky District, Leningrad Oblast, a logging depot settlement in Staropolskoye Settlement Municipal Formation of Slantsevsky District
- Novy, Tikhvinsky District, Leningrad Oblast, a logging depot settlement in Gorskoye Settlement Municipal Formation of Tikhvinsky District
- Novoye, Leningrad Oblast, a village under the administrative jurisdiction of Boksitogorskoye Settlement Municipal Formation in Boksitogorsky District
- Novaya, Yelizavetinskoye Settlement Municipal Formation, Gatchinsky District, Leningrad Oblast, a village in Yelizavetinskoye Settlement Municipal Formation of Gatchinsky District
- Novaya, Taitskoye Settlement Municipal Formation, Gatchinsky District, Leningrad Oblast, a village under the administrative jurisdiction of Taitskoye Settlement Municipal Formation in Gatchinsky District
- Novaya, Kirishsky District, Leningrad Oblast, a village under the administrative jurisdiction of Budogoshchskoye Settlement Municipal Formation in Kirishsky District
- Novaya, Tikhvinsky District, Leningrad Oblast, a village in Tsvylevskoye Settlement Municipal Formation of Tikhvinsky District
- Novaya, Tosnensky District, Leningrad Oblast, a village under the administrative jurisdiction of Fornosovskoye Settlement Municipal Formation in Tosnensky District
- Novaya, Kiselninskoye Settlement Municipal Formation, Volkhovsky District, Leningrad Oblast, a village in Kiselninskoye Settlement Municipal Formation of Volkhovsky District
- Novaya, Pashskoye Settlement Municipal Formation, Volkhovsky District, Leningrad Oblast, a village in Pashskoye Settlement Municipal Formation of Volkhovsky District

=== Lipetsk Oblast ===
As of 2012, five rural localities in Lipetsk Oblast bear this name:

- Novy, Lipetsk Oblast, a settlement in Volovchinsky Selsoviet of Volovsky District
- Novaya, Dankovsky District, Lipetsk Oblast, a village in Berezovsky Selsoviet of Dankovsky District
- Novaya, Dobrinsky District, Lipetsk Oblast, a village in Verkhnematrensky Selsoviet of Dobrinsky District
- Novaya, Izmalkovsky District, Lipetsk Oblast, a village in Lebyazhensky Selsoviet of Izmalkovsky District
- Novaya, Krasninsky District, Lipetsk Oblast, a village in Ishcheinsky Selsoviet of Krasninsky District

=== Mari El Republic ===
As of 2012, five rural localities in the Mari El Republic bear this name:

- Novy, Gornomariysky District, Mari El Republic, a settlement in Vilovatovsky Rural Okrug of Gornomariysky District
- Novy, Medvedevsky District, Mari El Republic, a settlement in Pekshiksolinsky Rural Okrug of Medvedevsky District
- Novaya, Troitskoposadsky Rural Okrug, Gornomariysky District, Mari El Republic, a village in Troitskoposadsky Rural Okrug of Gornomariysky District
- Novaya, Yelasovsky Rural Okrug, Gornomariysky District, Mari El Republic, a village in Yelasovsky Rural Okrug of Gornomariysky District
- Novaya, Morkinsky District, Mari El Republic, a village under the administrative jurisdiction of Morki Urban-Type Settlement in Morkinsky District

=== Moscow Oblast ===
As of 2012, eighteen rural localities in Moscow Oblast bear this name:

- Novy, Krasnogorsky District, Moscow Oblast, a settlement in Ilyinskoye Rural Settlement of Krasnogorsky District
- Novy, Yegoryevsky District, Moscow Oblast, a settlement under the administrative jurisdiction of the Town of Yegoryevsk in Yegoryevsky District
- Novoye, Kolomensky District, Moscow Oblast, a village in Nepetsinskoye Rural Settlement of Kolomensky District
- Novoye, Orekhovo-Zuyevsky District, Moscow Oblast, a village in Novinskoye Rural Settlement of Orekhovo-Zuyevsky District
- Novoye, Ramensky District, Moscow Oblast, a selo in Zabolotyevskoye Rural Settlement of Ramensky District
- Novoye, Shakhovskoy District, Moscow Oblast, a village in Seredinskoye Rural Settlement of Shakhovskoy District
- Novoye, Solnechnogorsky District, Moscow Oblast, a village in Smirnovskoye Rural Settlement of Solnechnogorsky District
- Novoye, Volokolamsky District, Moscow Oblast, a village in Teryayevskoye Rural Settlement of Volokolamsky District
- Novaya, Klinsky District, Moscow Oblast, a village in Voroninskoye Rural Settlement of Klinsky District
- Novaya, Kolomensky District, Moscow Oblast, a village in Khoroshovskoye Rural Settlement of Kolomensky District
- Novaya, Mozhaysky District, Moscow Oblast, a village under the administrative jurisdiction of the Town of Mozhaysk in Mozhaysky District
- Novaya, Naro-Fominsky District, Moscow Oblast, a village in Tashirovskoye Rural Settlement of Naro-Fominsky District
- Novaya, Orekhovo-Zuyevsky District, Moscow Oblast, a village in Gorskoye Rural Settlement of Orekhovo-Zuyevsky District
- Novaya, Staroruzskoye Rural Settlement, Ruzsky District, Moscow Oblast, a village in Staroruzskoye Rural Settlement of Ruzsky District
- Novaya, Volkovskoye Rural Settlement, Ruzsky District, Moscow Oblast, a village in Volkovskoye Rural Settlement of Ruzsky District
- Novaya, Serpukhovsky District, Moscow Oblast, a village in Vasilyevskoye Rural Settlement of Serpukhovsky District
- Novaya, Solnechnogorsky District, Moscow Oblast, a village in Sokolovskoye Rural Settlement of Solnechnogorsky District
- Novaya, Taldomsky District, Moscow Oblast, a village in Guslevskoye Rural Settlement of Taldomsky District

=== Nizhny Novgorod Oblast ===
As of 2012, six rural localities in Nizhny Novgorod Oblast bear this name:

- Novoye, Dalnekonstantinovsky District, Nizhny Novgorod Oblast, a selo in Dubravsky Selsoviet of Dalnekonstantinovsky District
- Novoye, Shatkovsky District, Nizhny Novgorod Oblast, a selo in Silinsky Selsoviet of Shatkovsky District
- Novaya, Nizhny Novgorod, Nizhny Novgorod Oblast, a village under the administrative jurisdiction of Nizhegorodsky City District of the city of oblast significance of Nizhny Novgorod
- Novaya, Chkalovsky District, Nizhny Novgorod Oblast, a village in Purekhovsky Selsoviet of Chkalovsky District
- Novaya, Knyagininsky District, Nizhny Novgorod Oblast, a village in Solovyevsky Selsoviet of Knyagininsky District
- Novaya, Spassky District, Nizhny Novgorod Oblast, a village in Vysokooselsky Selsoviet of Spassky District

=== Republic of North Ossetia–Alania ===
As of 2012, one rural locality in the Republic of North Ossetia–Alania bears this name:

- Novoye, Republic of North Ossetia–Alania, a selo in Chermensky Rural Okrug of Prigorodny District

=== Novgorod Oblast ===
As of 2012, six rural localities in Novgorod Oblast bear this name:

- Novaya, Chudovsky District, Novgorod Oblast, a village in Gruzinskoye Settlement of Chudovsky District
- Novaya, Kholmsky District, Novgorod Oblast, a village in Krasnoborskoye Settlement of Kholmsky District
- Novaya, Malovishersky District, Novgorod Oblast, a village in Verebyinskoye Settlement of Malovishersky District
- Novaya, Moshenskoy District, Novgorod Oblast, a village in Orekhovskoye Settlement of Moshenskoy District
- Novaya, Soletsky District, Novgorod Oblast, a village in Vybitskoye Settlement of Soletsky District
- Novaya, Valdaysky District, Novgorod Oblast, a village in Roshchinskoye Settlement of Valdaysky District

=== Omsk Oblast ===
As of 2012, one rural locality in Omsk Oblast bears this name:

- Novaya, Omsk Oblast, a village in Kalininsky Rural Okrug of Omsky District

=== Orenburg Oblast ===
As of 2012, two rural localities in Orenburg Oblast bear this name:

- Novy, Kuvandyksky District, Orenburg Oblast, a settlement in Uralsky Selsoviet of Kuvandyksky District
- Novy, Sorochinsky District, Orenburg Oblast, a settlement in Roshchinsky Selsoviet of Sorochinsky District

=== Oryol Oblast ===
As of 2012, three rural localities in Oryol Oblast bear this name:

- Novaya, Konshinsky Selsoviet, Verkhovsky District, Oryol Oblast, a village in Konshinsky Selsoviet of Verkhovsky District
- Novaya, Pesochensky Selsoviet, Verkhovsky District, Oryol Oblast, a village in Pesochensky Selsoviet of Verkhovsky District
- Novaya, Russko-Brodsky Selsoviet, Verkhovsky District, Oryol Oblast, a village in Russko-Brodsky Selsoviet of Verkhovsky District

=== Penza Oblast ===
As of 2012, one rural locality in Penza Oblast bears this name:

- Novoye, Penza Oblast, a selo in Kirovsky Selsoviet of Serdobsky District

=== Perm Krai ===
As of 2012, two rural localities in Perm Krai bear this name:

- Novy, Karagaysky District, Perm Krai, a settlement in Karagaysky District
- Novy, Permsky District, Perm Krai, a settlement in Permsky District

=== Primorsky Krai ===
As of 2012, two rural localities in Primorsky Krai bear this name:

- Novy, Primorsky Krai, a settlement in Nadezhdinsky District
- Novoye, Primorsky Krai, a selo in Mikhaylovsky District

=== Pskov Oblast ===
As of 2012, nine rural localities in Pskov Oblast bear this name:

- Novoye, Bezhanitsky District, Pskov Oblast, a village in Bezhanitsky District
- Novoye, Novosokolnichesky District, Pskov Oblast, a village in Novosokolnichesky District
- Novaya, Loknyansky District, Pskov Oblast, a village in Loknyansky District
- Novaya, Ostrovsky District, Pskov Oblast, a village in Ostrovsky District
- Novaya (Izborskaya Rural Settlement), Pechorsky District, Pskov Oblast, a village in Pechorsky District; municipally, a part of Izborskaya Rural Settlement of that district
- Novaya (Panikovskaya Rural Settlement), Pechorsky District, Pskov Oblast, a village in Pechorsky District; municipally, a part of Panikovskaya Rural Settlement of that district
- Novaya, Pskovsky District, Pskov Oblast, a village in Pskovsky District
- Novaya, Pustoshkinsky District, Pskov Oblast, a village in Pustoshkinsky District
- Novaya, Usvyatsky District, Pskov Oblast, a village in Usvyatsky District

=== Rostov Oblast ===
As of 2012, three rural localities in Rostov Oblast bear this name:

- Novy, Azovsky District, Rostov Oblast, a settlement in Kalinovskoye Rural Settlement of Azovsky District
- Novy, Martynovsky District, Rostov Oblast, a khutor in Rubashkinskoye Rural Settlement of Martynovsky District
- Novy, Vesyolovsky District, Rostov Oblast, a settlement in Verkhnesolenovskoye Rural Settlement of Vesyolovsky District

=== Ryazan Oblast ===
As of 2012, six rural localities in Ryazan Oblast bear this name:

- Novy, Ryazan Oblast, a settlement in Protasyevo-Uglyansky Rural Okrug of Chuchkovsky District
- Novoye, Sasovsky District, Ryazan Oblast, a village in Saltykovsky Rural Okrug of Sasovsky District
- Novoye, Skopinsky District, Ryazan Oblast, a selo in Novinsky Rural Okrug of Skopinsky District
- Novaya, Miloslavsky District, Ryazan Oblast, a village in Bolshepodovechinsky Rural Okrug of Miloslavsky District
- Novaya, Shatsky District, Ryazan Oblast, a village in Shevyrlyayevsky Rural Okrug of Shatsky District
- Novaya, Ukholovsky District, Ryazan Oblast, a village in Bogoroditsky Rural Okrug of Ukholovsky District

=== Sakha Republic ===
As of 2012, two rural localities in the Sakha Republic bear this name:

- Novy, Mirninsky District, Sakha Republic, a selo under the administrative jurisdiction of the settlement of Almazny in Mirninsky District
- Novy, Tomponsky District, Sakha Republic, a selo in Ynginsky Rural Okrug of Tomponsky District

=== Sakhalin Oblast ===
As of 2012, two rural localities in Sakhalin Oblast bear this name:

- Novoye, Korsakovsky District, Sakhalin Oblast, a selo in Korsakovsky District
- Novoye, Makarovsky District, Sakhalin Oblast, a selo in Makarovsky District

=== Saratov Oblast ===
As of 2012, three rural localities in Saratov Oblast bear this name:

- Novy, Perelyubsky District, Saratov Oblast, a settlement in Perelyubsky District
- Novy, Rovensky District, Saratov Oblast, a settlement in Rovensky District
- Novy, Yershovsky District, Saratov Oblast, a settlement in Yershovsky District

=== Smolensk Oblast ===
As of 2012, eight rural localities in Smolensk Oblast bear this name:

- Novy, Smolensk Oblast, a selo in Stepanikovskoye Rural Settlement of Vyazemsky District
- Novoye, Gagarinsky District, Smolensk Oblast, a village in Tokarevskoye Rural Settlement of Gagarinsky District
- Novoye, Ugransky District, Smolensk Oblast, a village in Podsosonskoye Rural Settlement of Ugransky District
- Novaya, Dukhovshchinsky District, Smolensk Oblast, a village in Dobrinskoye Rural Settlement of Dukhovshchinsky District
- Novaya, Glinkovskoye Rural Settlement, Glinkovsky District, Smolensk Oblast, a village in Glinkovskoye Rural Settlement of Glinkovsky District
- Novaya, Romodanovskoye Rural Settlement, Glinkovsky District, Smolensk Oblast, a village in Romodanovskoye Rural Settlement of Glinkovsky District
- Novaya, Kholm-Zhirkovsky District, Smolensk Oblast, a village in Steshinskoye Rural Settlement of Kholm-Zhirkovsky District
- Novaya, Novoduginsky District, Smolensk Oblast, a village in Izvekovskoye Rural Settlement of Novoduginsky District

=== Stavropol Krai ===
As of 2012, one rural locality in Stavropol Krai bears this name:

- Novy, Stavropol Krai, a settlement in Georgiyevsky District

=== Sverdlovsk Oblast ===
As of 2012, four rural localities in Sverdlovsk Oblast bear this name:

- Novy, Sverdlovsk Oblast, a settlement in Kamyshlovsky District
- Novaya, Prigorodny District, Sverdlovsk Oblast, a village in Prigorodny District
- Novaya, Slobodo-Turinsky District, Sverdlovsk Oblast, a village in Slobodo-Turinsky District
- Novaya, Talitsky District, Sverdlovsk Oblast, a village in Talitsky District

=== Tambov Oblast ===
As of 2012, three rural localities in Tambov Oblast bear this name:

- Novy, Tambov Oblast, a settlement in Dmitriyevsky Selsoviet of Morshansky District
- Novaya, Sosnovsky District, Tambov Oblast, a village in Degtyansky Selsoviet of Sosnovsky District
- Novaya, Uvarovsky District, Tambov Oblast, a village in Verkhneshibryaysky Selsoviet of Uvarovsky District

=== Republic of Tatarstan ===
As of 2012, two rural localities in the Republic of Tatarstan bear this name:

- Novy, Mamadyshsky District, Republic of Tatarstan, a settlement in Mamadyshsky District
- Novy, Tukayevsky District, Republic of Tatarstan, a settlement in Tukayevsky District

=== Tomsk Oblast ===
As of 2012, one rural locality in Tomsk Oblast bears this name:

- Novy, Tomsk Oblast, a settlement in Pervomaysky District

=== Tula Oblast ===
As of 2012, three rural localities in Tula Oblast bear this name:

- Novy, Leninsky District, Tula Oblast, a settlement in Rassvetovsky Rural Okrug of Leninsky District
- Novy, Uzlovsky District, Tula Oblast, a settlement in Lyutoricheskaya Rural Administration of Uzlovsky District
- Novaya, Tula Oblast, a village in Novopokrovskaya Rural Administration of Chernsky District

=== Tver Oblast ===
As of 2012, twenty-two rural localities in Tver Oblast bear this name:

- Novy, Toropetsky District, Tver Oblast, a settlement in Ploskoshskoye Rural Settlement of Toropetsky District
- Novy, Vyshnevolotsky District, Tver Oblast, a settlement in Yesenovichskoye Rural Settlement of Vyshnevolotsky District
- Novoye, Kalininsky District, Tver Oblast, a village in Verkhnevolzhskoye Rural Settlement of Kalininsky District
- Novoye, Kalyazinsky District, Tver Oblast, a village in Nerlskoye Rural Settlement of Kalyazinsky District
- Novoye, Kiverichi Rural Settlement, Rameshkovsky District, Tver Oblast, a village in Kiverichi Rural Settlement of Rameshkovsky District
- Novoye, Vysokovo Rural Settlement, Rameshkovsky District, Tver Oblast, a village in Vysokovo Rural Settlement of Rameshkovsky District
- Novoye, Pankovo Rural Settlement, Staritsky District, Tver Oblast, a village in Pankovo Rural Settlement of Staritsky District
- Novoye, Staritsa Rural Settlement, Staritsky District, Tver Oblast, a village in Staritsa Rural Settlement of Staritsky District
- Novoye, Ploskoshskoye Rural Settlement, Toropetsky District, Tver Oblast, a village in Ploskoshskoye Rural Settlement of Toropetsky District
- Novoye, Ploskoshskoye Rural Settlement, Toropetsky District, Tver Oblast, a village in Ploskoshskoye Rural Settlement of Toropetsky District
- Novoye, Torzhoksky District, Tver Oblast, a village in Vysokovskoye Rural Settlement of Torzhoksky District
- Novoye, Vesyegonsky District, Tver Oblast, a village in Romanovskoye Rural Settlement of Vesyegonsky District
- Novoye, Pogorelskoye Rural Settlement, Zubtsovsky District, Tver Oblast, a village in Pogorelskoye Rural Settlement of Zubtsovsky District
- Novoye, Stolipinskoye Rural Settlement, Zubtsovsky District, Tver Oblast, a village in Stolipinskoye Rural Settlement of Zubtsovsky District
- Novaya, Andreapolsky District, Tver Oblast, a village in Khotilitskoye Rural Settlement of Andreapolsky District
- Novaya, Likhoslavlsky District, Tver Oblast, a village in Kavskoye Rural Settlement of Likhoslavlsky District
- Novaya, Grishinskoye Rural Settlement, Oleninsky District, Tver Oblast, a village in Grishinskoye Rural Settlement of Oleninsky District
- Novaya, Mostovskoye Rural Settlement, Oleninsky District, Tver Oblast, a village in Mostovskoye Rural Settlement of Oleninsky District
- Novaya, Mostovskoye Rural Settlement, Oleninsky District, Tver Oblast, a village in Mostovskoye Rural Settlement of Oleninsky District
- Novaya, Toropetsky District, Tver Oblast, a village in Skvortsovskoye Rural Settlement of Toropetsky District
- Novaya, Zapadnodvinsky District, Tver Oblast, a village in Zapadnodvinskoye Rural Settlement of Zapadnodvinsky District
- Novaya, Zharkovsky District, Tver Oblast, a village in Shchucheyskoye Rural Settlement of Zharkovsky District

=== Udmurt Republic ===
As of 2012, one rural locality in the Udmurt Republic bears this name:

- Novy, Udmurt Republic, a settlement in Votkinsky District

=== Ulyanovsk Oblast ===
As of 2012, one rural locality in Ulyanovsk Oblast bears this name:

- Novy, Ulyanovsk Oblast, a settlement under the administrative jurisdiction of Nikolayevsky Settlement Okrug in Nikolayevsky District

=== Vladimir Oblast ===
As of 2012, ten rural localities in Vladimir Oblast bear this name:

- Novy, Kovrovsky District, Vladimir Oblast, a settlement in Kovrovsky District
- Novy, Suzdalsky District, Vladimir Oblast, a settlement in Suzdalsky District
- Novoye, Kolchuginsky District, Vladimir Oblast, a selo in Kolchuginsky District
- Novoye, Kovrovsky District, Vladimir Oblast, a selo in Kovrovsky District
- Novoye, Suzdalsky District, Vladimir Oblast, a selo in Suzdalsky District
- Novoye, Yuryev-Polsky District, Vladimir Oblast, a selo in Yuryev-Polsky District
- Novaya, Kolchuginsky District, Vladimir Oblast, a village in Kolchuginsky District
- Novaya, Kolchuginsky District, Vladimir Oblast, a village in Kolchuginsky District
- Novaya, Sudogodsky District, Vladimir Oblast, a village in Sudogodsky District
- Novaya, Yuryev-Polsky District, Vladimir Oblast, a village in Yuryev-Polsky District

=== Volgograd Oblast ===
As of 2012, one rural locality in Volgograd Oblast bears this name:

- Novy, Volgograd Oblast, a khutor in Kaysatsky Selsoviet of Pallasovsky District

=== Vologda Oblast ===
As of 2012, twenty-one rural localities in Vologda Oblast bear this name:

- Novy, Kichmengsko-Gorodetsky District, Vologda Oblast, a pochinok in Verkhneyentalsky Selsoviet of Kichmengsko-Gorodetsky District
- Novy, Sokolsky District, Vologda Oblast, a settlement in Dvinitsky Selsoviet of Sokolsky District
- Novoye, Gryazovetsky District, Vologda Oblast, a village in Yurovsky Selsoviet of Gryazovetsky District
- Novoye, Kaduysky District, Vologda Oblast, a village in Nikolsky Selsoviet of Kaduysky District
- Novoye, Mezhdurechensky District, Vologda Oblast, a selo in Staroselsky Selsoviet of Mezhdurechensky District
- Novoye, Chuchkovsky Selsoviet, Sokolsky District, Vologda Oblast, a village in Chuchkovsky Selsoviet of Sokolsky District
- Novoye, Nesterovsky Selsoviet, Sokolsky District, Vologda Oblast, a village in Nesterovsky Selsoviet of Sokolsky District
- Novoye, Vorobyevsky Selsoviet, Sokolsky District, Vologda Oblast, a village in Vorobyevsky Selsoviet of Sokolsky District
- Novoye, Filisovsky Selsoviet, Ust-Kubinsky District, Vologda Oblast, a selo in Filisovsky Selsoviet of Ust-Kubinsky District
- Novoye, Mitensky Selsoviet, Ust-Kubinsky District, Vologda Oblast, a village in Mitensky Selsoviet of Ust-Kubinsky District
- Novoye, Borisovsky Selsoviet, Vologodsky District, Vologda Oblast, a village in Borisovsky Selsoviet of Vologodsky District
- Novoye, Leskovsky Selsoviet, Vologodsky District, Vologda Oblast, a village in Leskovsky Selsoviet of Vologodsky District
- Novoye, Pudegsky Selsoviet, Vologodsky District, Vologda Oblast, a village in Pudegsky Selsoviet of Vologodsky District
- Novoye, Sosnovsky Selsoviet, Vologodsky District, Vologda Oblast, a village in Sosnovsky Selsoviet of Vologodsky District
- Novaya, Babayevsky District, Vologda Oblast, a village in Novostarinsky Selsoviet of Babayevsky District
- Novaya, Chagodoshchensky District, Vologda Oblast, a village in Pervomaysky Selsoviet of Chagodoshchensky District
- Novaya, Cherepovetsky District, Vologda Oblast, a village in Musorsky Selsoviet of Cherepovetsky District
- Novaya, Mezhdurechensky District, Vologda Oblast, a village in Nozemsky Selsoviet of Mezhdurechensky District
- Novaya, Ustyuzhensky District, Vologda Oblast, a village in Mezzhensky Selsoviet of Ustyuzhensky District
- Novaya, Vozhegodsky District, Vologda Oblast, a village in Yavengsky Selsoviet of Vozhegodsky District
- Novaya, Vytegorsky District, Vologda Oblast, a village in Kemsky Selsoviet of Vytegorsky District

=== Yaroslavl Oblast ===
As of 2012, nineteen rural localities in Yaroslavl Oblast bear this name:

- Novy, Breytovsky District, Yaroslavl Oblast, a settlement in Ulyanovsky Rural Okrug of Breytovsky District
- Novy, Gavrilov-Yamsky District, Yaroslavl Oblast, a settlement in Velikoselsky Rural Okrug of Gavrilov-Yamsky District
- Novoye, Bolsheselsky District, Yaroslavl Oblast, a selo in Novoselsky Rural Okrug of Bolsheselsky District
- Novoye, Breytovsky District, Yaroslavl Oblast, a village in Sevastyantsevsky Rural Okrug of Breytovsky District
- Novoye, Danilovsky District, Yaroslavl Oblast, a selo in Trofimovsky Rural Okrug of Danilovsky District
- Novoye, Nekrasovsky District, Yaroslavl Oblast, a selo in Burmakinsky Rural Okrug of Nekrasovsky District
- Novoye, Pereslavsky District, Yaroslavl Oblast, a selo in Glebovsky Rural Okrug of Pereslavsky District
- Novoye, Pervomaysky District, Yaroslavl Oblast, a selo in Ignattsevsky Rural Okrug of Pervomaysky District
- Novoye, Rybinsky District, Yaroslavl Oblast, a village in Oktyabrsky Rural Okrug of Rybinsky District
- Novoye, Fominsky Rural Okrug, Tutayevsky District, Yaroslavl Oblast, a village in Fominsky Rural Okrug of Tutayevsky District
- Novoye, Rodionovsky Rural Okrug, Tutayevsky District, Yaroslavl Oblast, a selo in Rodionovsky Rural Okrug of Tutayevsky District
- Novoye, Uglichsky District, Yaroslavl Oblast, a village in Vozdvizhensky Rural Okrug of Uglichsky District
- Novaya, Bolsheselsky District, Yaroslavl Oblast, a village in Bolsheselsky Rural Okrug of Bolsheselsky District
- Novaya, Nekrasovsky District, Yaroslavl Oblast, a village in Diyevo-Gorodishchensky Rural Okrug of Nekrasovsky District
- Novaya, Pereslavsky District, Yaroslavl Oblast, a village in Veskovsky Rural Okrug of Pereslavsky District
- Novaya, Oktyabrsky Rural Okrug, Rybinsky District, Yaroslavl Oblast, a village in Oktyabrsky Rural Okrug of Rybinsky District
- Novaya, Pokrovsky Rural Okrug, Rybinsky District, Yaroslavl Oblast, a village in Pokrovsky Rural Okrug of Rybinsky District
- Novaya, Uglichsky District, Yaroslavl Oblast, a village in Maymersky Rural Okrug of Uglichsky District
- Novaya, Yaroslavsky District, Yaroslavl Oblast, a village in Nekrasovsky Rural Okrug of Yaroslavsky District

=== Zabaykalsky Krai ===
As of 2012, one rural locality in Zabaykalsky Krai bears this name:

- Novoye, Zabaykalsky Krai, a selo in Shilkinsky District

== Abolished localities ==
- Novaya, Krasnobakovsky District, Nizhny Novgorod Oblast, a village in Prudovsky Selsoviet of Krasnobakovsky District in Nizhny Novgorod Oblast; abolished in July 2009

== Alternative names ==
- Novaya, alternative name of Novaya Taraba, a selo in Novotarabinsky Selsoviet of Kytmanovsky District in Altai Krai; 53°23′N 85°17′E
- Novy, alternative name of Novoye, a selo in Kizlyarsky Selsoviet of Kizlyarsky District in the Republic of Dagestan; 53°54′N 46°46′E
- Novoye, alternative name of Novoye Selo, a selo in Melensky Rural Administrative Okrug of Starodubsky District in Bryansk Oblast; 52°42′N 32°49′E
