= Klyuchi, Amur Oblast =

Klyuchi Ключи
- Selo
- Location within Amur Oblast Location within Russia
- Coordinates: 50°56′N 128°10′E
- Country: Russia
- Region: Amur Oblast
- District: Belogorsky District
- Time zone: UTC+9:00

Klyuchi (Russian: Ключи) is a rural locality (a selo) in Nikolsky Selsoviet of Belogorsky District, Amur Oblast, Russia. The population was 184 as of 2018. There are 4 streets.

== Geography ==
The village is located on the left bank of the Tom River, 24 km west of Belogorsk (the district's administrative centre) by road. Kiseleozyorka is the nearest rural locality.
