= Mezhdugranka =

Mezhdugranka Междугранка
- Selo
- Location within Amur Oblast Location within Russia
- Coordinates: 50°54′N 128°35′E
- Country: Russia
- Region: Amur Oblast
- District: Belogorsky District
- Time zone: UTC+9:00

Mezhdugranka (Russian: Междугранка) is a rural locality (a selo) in Vasilyevsky Selsoviet of Belogorsky District, Amur Oblast, Russia. The population was 345 as of 2018. There are 8 streets.

== Geography ==
Mezhdugranka is located near the left bank of the Tom River, 9 km southeast of Belogorsk (the district's administrative centre) by road. Vasilyevka is the nearest rural locality.
