= Kiseleozyorka =

Kiseleozyorka Киселеозёрка
- Selo
- Location within Amur Oblast Location within Russia
- Coordinates: 50°56′N 128°07′E
- Country: Russia
- Region: Amur Oblast
- District: Belogorsky District
- Time zone: UTC+9:00

Kiseleozyorka (Russian: Киселеозёрка) is a rural locality (a selo) in Nikolsky Selsoviet of Belogorsky District, Amur Oblast, Russia. As of 2018, it had a population of 217 people and consists of 3 streets.

== Geography ==
Kiseleozyorka is located on the left bank of the Tom River, 28 km west of Belogorsk (the district's administrative centre) by road. Klyuchi is the nearest rural locality.
