= Uronda Bolshaya =

Uronda Bolshaya Уронда Большая
- Selo
- Location within Ivanovo Oblast Location within Russia
- Coordinates: 56°43′N 40°10′E
- Country: Russia
- Region: Ivanovo Oblast
- District: Gavrilovo-Posadsky District
- Time zone: UTC+3:00

Uronda Bolshaya (Russian: Уронда Большая) is a rural locality (a selo) in Gavrilovo-Posadsky District, Ivanovo Oblast, Russia. Population: 30 (2010 census);

== Geography ==
This rural locality is located 19 km from Gavrilov Posad (the district's administrative centre), 57 km from Ivanovo (capital of Ivanovo Oblast) and 190 km from Moscow. Yarishnevo is the nearest rural locality.
