= Novoye, Amur Oblast =

Novoye Новое
- Selo
- Location within Amur Oblast Location within Russia
- Coordinates: 50°52′N 128°59′E
- Country: Russia
- Region: Amur Oblast
- District: Belogorsky District
- Time zone: UTC+9:00

Novoye (Russian: Новое) is a rural locality (a selo) and the administrative center of Novinsky Selsoviet of Belogorsky District, Amur Oblast, Russia. The population was 398 as of 2018. There are 12 streets.

== Geography ==
Novoye is located on the left bank of the Tom River, 40 km east of Belogorsk (the district's administrative centre) by road. Krugloye is the nearest rural locality.
