= Mirslavl =

Mirslavl Мирславль
- Selo
- Location within Ivanovo Oblast Location within Russia
- Coordinates: 56°46′N 39°58′E
- Country: Russia
- Region: Ivanovo Oblast
- District: Gavrilovo-Posadsky District
- Time zone: UTC+3:00

Mirslavl (Russian: Мирславль) is a rural locality (a selo) in Gavrilovo-Posadsky District, Ivanovo Oblast, Russia. Population: 102 (2010 census);

== Geography ==
This rural locality is located 27 km from Gavrilov Posad (the district's administrative centre), 65 km from Ivanovo (capital of Ivanovo Oblast) and 183 km from Moscow. Studenets is the nearest rural locality.
