= Yardenikha =

Yardenikha Ярдениха
- Village
- Location within Ivanovo Oblast Location within Russia
- Coordinates: 56°00′N 40°00′E
- Country: Russia
- Region: Ivanovo Oblast
- District: Gavrilovo-Posadsky District
- Time zone: UTC+3:00

Yardenikha (Russian: Ярдениха) is a rural locality (a village) in Gavrilovo-Posadsky District, Ivanovo Oblast, Russia. Population: 91 (2010 census);

== Geography ==
This rural locality is located 16 km from Gavrilov Posad (the district's administrative centre), 75 km from Ivanovo (capital of Ivanovo Oblast) and 172 km from Moscow. Natalikha is the nearest rural locality.
