= Gorodishchi, Ivanovo Oblast =

Gorodishchi Городищи
- Village
- Location within Ivanovo Oblast Location within Russia
- Coordinates: 56°33′N 40°03′E
- Country: Russia
- Region: Ivanovo Oblast
- District: Gavrilovo-Posadsky District
- Time zone: UTC+3:00

Gorodishchi (Russian: Городищи) is a rural locality (a village) in Gavrilovo-Posadsky District, Ivanovo Oblast, Russia. Population: 203 (2010 census);

== Geography ==
This rural locality is located 4 km from Gavrilov Posad (the district's administrative centre), 73 km from Ivanovo (capital of Ivanovo Oblast) and 175 km from Moscow. Volodyatino is the nearest rural locality.
