= Skomovo =

Skomovo Скомово
- Selo
- Location within Ivanovo Oblast Location within Russia
- Coordinates: 56°36′N 39°52′E
- Country: Russia
- Region: Ivanovo Oblast
- District: Gavrilovo-Posadsky District
- Time zone: UTC+3:00

Church of the Kazan Icon of the Mother of God: Skomovo, Gavrilovo-Posadsky District, Ivanovo Region

Skomovo (Russian: Скомово) is a rural locality (a selo) in Gavrilovo-Posadsky District, Ivanovo Oblast, Russia. Population: 186 (2010 census);

== Geography ==
This rural locality is located 16 km from Gavrilov Posad (the district's administrative centre), 80 km from Ivanovo (capital of Ivanovo Oblast) and 167 km from Moscow. Vladychino is the nearest rural locality.
