= Borodino, Ivanovo Oblast =

Borodino Бородино
- Selo
- Location within Ivanovo Oblast Location within Russia
- Coordinates: 56°33′N 40°15′E
- Country: Russia
- Region: Ivanovo Oblast
- District: Gavrilovo-Posadsky District
- Time zone: UTC+3:00

Borodino (Russian: Бородино) is a rural locality (a selo) in Gavrilovo-Posadsky District, Ivanovo Oblast, Russia. Population: 1,332 (2010 census);

== Geography ==
This rural locality is located 8 km from Gavrilov Posad (the district's administrative centre), 66 km from Ivanovo (capital of Ivanovo Oblast) and 184 km from Moscow. Shukhra is the nearest rural locality.
