= Gavrilovo-Posadsky =

Gavrilovo-Posadsky (masculine), Gavrilovo-Posadskaya (feminine), or Gavrilovo-Posadskoye (neuter) may refer to:

- Gavrilovo-Posadsky District, a district of Ivanovo Oblast, Russia
- Gavrilovo-Posadskoye Urban Settlement, a municipal formation which the town of Gavrilov Posad and eleven rural localities in Gavrilovo-Posadsky District of Ivanovo Oblast, Russia are incorporated as
