= Urusobino =

Urusobino Урусобино
- Village
- Location within Ivanovo Oblast Location within Russia
- Coordinates: 56°33′N 40°21′E
- Country: Russia
- Region: Ivanovo Oblast
- District: Gavrilovo-Posadsky District
- Time zone: UTC+3:00

Urusobino (Russian: Урусобино) is a rural locality (a village) in Gavrilovo-Posadsky District, Ivanovo Oblast, Russia. Population: 60 (2010 census);

== Geography ==
This rural locality is located 15 km from Gavrilov Posad (the district's administrative centre), 61 km from Ivanovo (capital of Ivanovo Oblast) and 190 km from Moscow. Sankovo is the nearest rural locality.
