= Kholodikha =

Kholodikha Холодиха
- Village
- Location within Ivanovo Oblast Location within Russia
- Coordinates: 56°39′N 39°56′E
- Country: Russia
- Region: Ivanovo Oblast
- District: Gavrilovo-Posadsky District
- Time zone: UTC+3:00

Kholodikha (Russian: Холодиха) is a rural locality (a village) in Gavrilovo-Posadsky District, Ivanovo Oblast, Russia. Population: 7 (2010 census);

== Geography ==
This rural locality is located 16 km from Gavrilov Posad (the district's administrative centre), 73 km from Ivanovo (capital of Ivanovo Oblast) and 174 km from Moscow. Svoznya is the nearest rural locality.
