= Lukyanovka =

Lukyanovka Лукьяновка
- Selo
- Location within Amur Oblast Location within Russia
- Coordinates: 50°50′N 128°12′E
- Country: Russia
- Region: Amur Oblast
- District: Belogorsky District
- Time zone: UTC+9:00

Lukyanovka (Russian: Лукьяновка) is a rural locality (a selo) in Kustanayevsky Selsoviet of Belogorsky District, Amur Oblast, Russia. The population is 139 as of 2018. There are 2 streets.

== Geography ==
Lukyanovka is located 26 km southwest of Belogorsk (the district's administrative centre) by road. Kustanayevka is the nearest rural locality.
