= Teryayevo =

Teryayevo (Russian: Теряево) is the name of several rural localities in Russia:

- Teryayevo, Ivanovo Oblast, a village in Gavrilovo-Posadsky District of Ivanovo Oblast
- Teryayevo, Dmitrovsky District, Moscow Oblast, a village under the administrative jurisdiction of the Town of Dmitrov in Dmitrovsky District of Moscow Oblast
- Teryayevo, Volokolamsky District, Moscow Oblast, a selo in Teryayevskoye Rural Settlement of Volokolamsky District of Moscow Oblast
- Teryayevo, Nizhny Novgorod Oblast, a village in Aleshkovsky Selsoviet of Bogorodsky District of Nizhny Novgorod Oblast
- Teryayevo, Oryol Oblast, a village in Berezovsky Selsoviet of Pokrovsky District of Oryol Oblast
- Teryayevo, Vologda Oblast, a village in Ferapontovsky Selsoviet of Kirillovsky District of Vologda Oblast
- Teryayevo, Yaroslavl Oblast, a village in Abbakumtsevsky Rural Okrug of Nekrasovsky District of Yaroslavl Oblast
