= Doutrovo =

Doutrovo Доутрово
- Village
- Location within Ivanovo Oblast Location within Russia
- Coordinates: 56°37′N 40°15′E
- Country: Russia
- Region: Ivanovo Oblast
- District: Gavrilovo-Posadsky District
- Time zone: UTC+3:00

Doutrovo (Russian: Доутрово) is a rural locality (a village) in Gavrilovo-Posadsky District, Ivanovo Oblast, Russia. Population: 16 (2010 census);

== Geography ==
This rural locality is located 10 km from Gavrilov Posad (the district's administrative centre), 60 km from Ivanovo (capital of Ivanovo Oblast) and 188 km from Moscow. Novi is the nearest rural locality.
