= Lychevo =

Lychevo Лычево
- Selo
- Location within Ivanovo Oblast Location within Russia
- Coordinates: 56°31′N 40°02′E
- Country: Russia
- Region: Ivanovo Oblast
- District: Gavrilovo-Posadsky District
- Time zone: UTC+3:00

Lychevo (Russian: Лычево) is a rural locality (a selo) in Gavrilovo-Posadsky District, Ivanovo Oblast, Russia. Population: 148 (2010 census);

== Geography ==
This rural locality is located 7 km from Gavrilov Posad (the district's administrative centre), 78 km from Ivanovo (capital of Ivanovo Oblast) and 171 km from Moscow. Osankovo is the nearest rural locality.
