= Vladychino =

Vladychino Владычино
- Selo
- Location within Ivanovo Oblast Location within Russia
- Coordinates: 56°35′N 39°54′E
- Country: Russia
- Region: Ivanovo Oblast
- District: Gavrilovo-Posadsky District
- Time zone: UTC+3:00

Vladychino (Russian: Владычино) is a rural locality (a selo) in Gavrilovo-Posadsky District, Ivanovo Oblast, Russia. Population: 31 (2010 census);

== Geography ==
This rural locality is located 14 km from Gavrilov Posad (the district's administrative centre), 78 km from Ivanovo (capital of Ivanovo Oblast) and 168 km from Moscow. Pinogor is the nearest rural locality.
