= Vyvozikha =

Vyvozikha Вывозиха
- Village
- Location within Ivanovo Oblast Location within Russia
- Coordinates: 56°41′N 40°17′E
- Country: Russia
- Region: Ivanovo Oblast
- District: Gavrilovo-Posadsky District
- Time zone: UTC+3:00

Vyvozikha (Russian: Вывозиха) is a rural locality (a village) in Gavrilovo-Posadsky District, Ivanovo Oblast, Russia. Population: 6 (2010 census);

== Geography ==
This rural locality is located 18 km from Gavrilov Posad (the district's administrative centre), 53 km from Ivanovo (the capital of Ivanovo Oblast) and 194 km from Moscow. Yasnovo is the nearest rural locality.
