= Kozlovo, Gavrilovo-Posadsky District, Ivanovo Oblast =

Kozlovo Козлово
- Selo
- Location within Ivanovo Oblast Location within Russia
- Coordinates: 56°29′N 40°09′E
- Country: Russia
- Region: Ivanovo Oblast
- District: Gavrilovo-Posadsky District
- Time zone: UTC+3:00

Kozlovo (Russian: Козлово) is a rural locality (a selo) in Gavrilovo-Posadsky District, Ivanovo Oblast, Russia. Population: 25 (2010 census);

== Geography ==
This rural locality is located 9 km from Gavrilov Posad (the district's administrative centre), 75 km from Ivanovo (capital of Ivanovo Oblast) and 176 km from Moscow. Nepotyagovo is the nearest rural locality.
