= Yaryshevo, Ivanovo Oblast =

Yaryshevo Ярышево
- Selo
- Location within Ivanovo Oblast Location within Russia
- Coordinates: 56°35′N 40°07′E
- Country: Russia
- Region: Ivanovo Oblast
- District: Gavrilovo-Posadsky District
- Time zone: UTC+3:00

Yaryshevo (Russian: Ярышево) is a rural locality (a selo) in Gavrilovo-Posadsky District, Ivanovo Oblast, Russia. Population: 103 (2010 census);

== Geography ==
This rural locality is located 3 km from Gavrilov Posad (the district's administrative centre), 68 km from Ivanovo (capital of Ivanovo Oblast) and 179 km from Moscow. Voymiga is the nearest rural locality.
