= Davydovskoye Maloye =

Davydovskoye Maloye Давыдовское Малое
- Selo
- Location within Ivanovo Oblast Location within Russia
- Coordinates: 56°31′N 40°12′E
- Country: Russia
- Region: Ivanovo Oblast
- District: Gavrilovo-Posadsky District
- Time zone: UTC+3:00

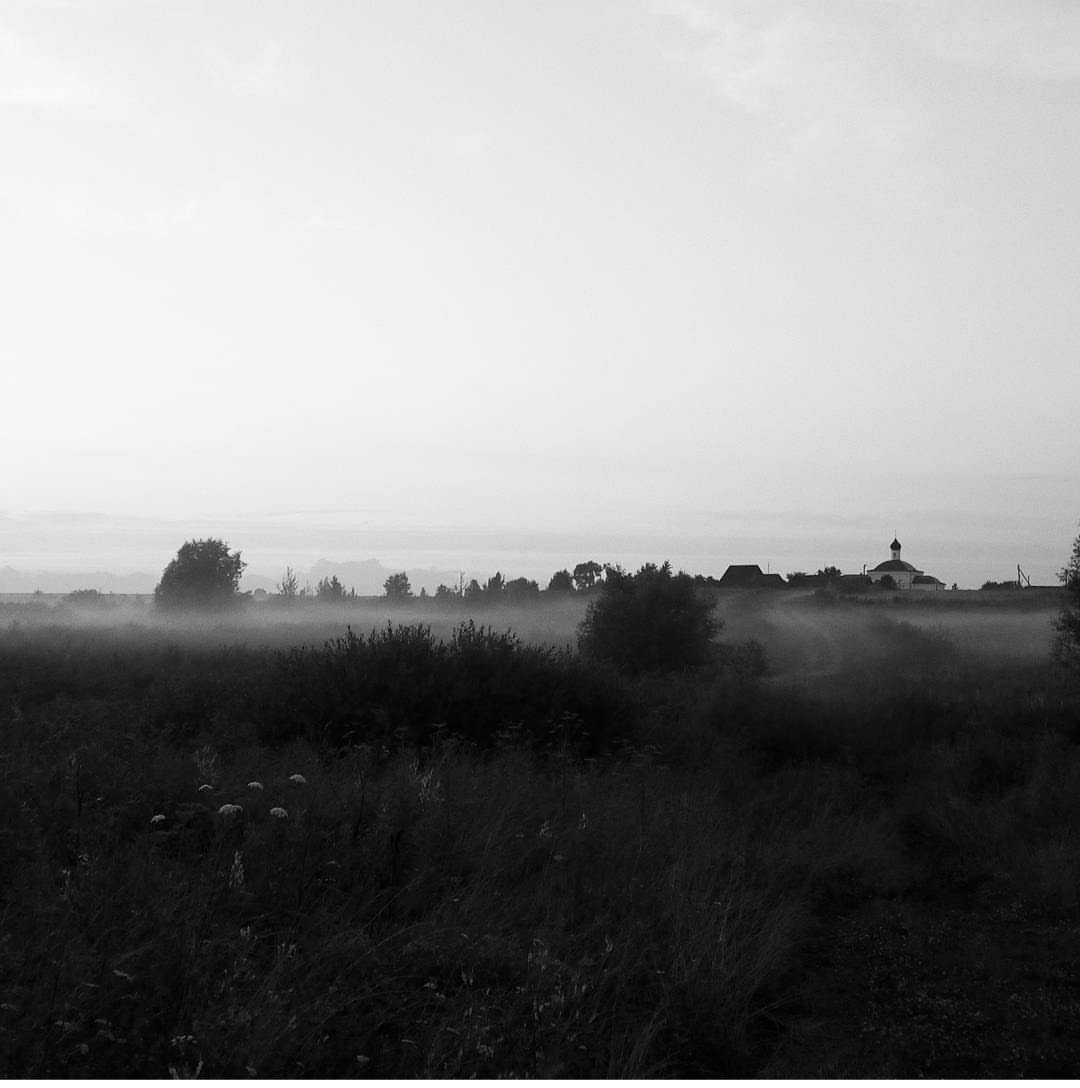
Church in honor of the Intercession of the Blessed Virgin Mary: Davydovskoye Maloye, Gavrilovo-Posadsky district, Ivanovo region

Davydovskoye Maloye (Russian: Давыдовское Малое) is a rural locality (a selo) in Gavrilovo-Posadsky District, Ivanovo Oblast, Russia. Population: 11 (2010 census);

== Geography ==
This rural locality is located 7 km from Gavrilov Posad (the district's administrative centre), 70 km from Ivanovo (capital of Ivanovo Oblast) and 181 km from Moscow. Davydovskoye Bolshoye is the nearest rural locality.
