= Shatry =

Shatry Шатры
- Village
- Location within Ivanovo Oblast Location within Russia
- Coordinates: 56°37′N 40°18′E
- Country: Russia
- Region: Ivanovo Oblast
- District: Gavrilovo-Posadsky District
- Time zone: UTC+3:00

Shatry (Russian: Шатры) is a rural locality (a village) in Gavrilovo-Posadsky District, Ivanovo Oblast, Russia. Population: 10 (2010 census);

== Geography ==
This rural locality is located 13 km from Gavrilov Posad (the district's administrative centre), 58 km from Ivanovo (capital of Ivanovo Oblast) and 191 km from Moscow. Morozovo is the nearest rural locality.
