= Klyuchi, Ivanovo Oblast =

Klyuchi Ключи
- Village
- Location within Ivanovo Oblast Location within Russia
- Coordinates: 56°28′N 39°59′E
- Country: Russia
- Region: Ivanovo Oblast
- District: Gavrilovo-Posadsky District
- Time zone: UTC+3:00

Klyuchi (Russian: Ключи) is a rural locality (a village) in Gavrilovo-Posadsky District, Ivanovo Oblast, Russia. Population: 25 (2010 census);

== Geography ==
This rural locality is located 11 km from Gavrilov Posad (the district's administrative centre), 82 km from Ivanovo (capital of Ivanovo Oblast) and 167 km from Moscow. Dubenki is the nearest rural locality.
