= Zagorye, Ivanovo Oblast =

Zagorye Загорье
- Selo
- Location within Ivanovo Oblast Location within Russia
- Coordinates: 56°30′N 39°57′E
- Country: Russia
- Region: Ivanovo Oblast
- District: Gavrilovo-Posadsky District
- Time zone: UTC+3:00

Zagorye (Russian: Загорье) is a rural locality (a selo) in Gavrilovo-Posadsky District, Ivanovo Oblast, Russia. Population: 232 (2010 census);

== Geography ==
This rural locality is located 12 km from Gavrilov Posad (the district's administrative centre), 82 km from Ivanovo (capital of Ivanovo Oblast) and 166 km from Moscow. Rykovo is the nearest rural locality.
