= Nepotyagovo, Gavrilovo-Posadsky District, Ivanovo Oblast =

Nepotyagovo Непотягово
- Selo
- Location within Ivanovo Oblast Location within Russia
- Coordinates: 56°28′N 40°08′E
- Country: Russia
- Region: Ivanovo Oblast
- District: Gavrilovo-Posadsky District
- Time zone: UTC+3:00

Nepotyagovo (Russian: Непотягово) is a rural locality (a selo) in Gavrilovo-Posadsky District, Ivanovo Oblast, Russia. Population: 311 (2010 census);

== Geography ==
This rural locality is located 9 km from Gavrilov Posad (the district's administrative centre), 77 km from Ivanovo (capital of Ivanovo Oblast) and 174 km from Moscow. Kozlovo is the nearest rural locality.
