= Svoznya =

Svoznya Свозня
- Selo
- Location within Ivanovo Oblast Location within Russia
- Coordinates: 56°40′N 39°55′E
- Country: Russia
- Region: Ivanovo Oblast
- District: Gavrilovo-Posadsky District
- Time zone: UTC+3:00

Svoznya (Russian: Свозня) is a rural locality (a selo) in Gavrilovo-Posadsky District, Ivanovo Oblast, Russia. Population: 32 (2010 census);

== Geography ==
This rural locality is located 18 km from Gavrilov Posad (the district's administrative centre), 73 km from Ivanovo (capital of Ivanovo Oblast) and 174 km from Moscow. Kholodikha is the nearest rural locality.
