= Pechishchi =

Pechishchi (Russian: Печищи) is the name of several rural localities in Russia:

- Pechishchi, Ivanovo Oblast, a village in Gavrilovo-Posadsky District of Ivanovo Oblast
- Pechishchi, Republic of Tatarstan, a selo in Verkhneuslonsky District of the Republic of Tatarstan
