= Petryaikha =

Petryaikha Петряиха
- Village
- Location within Ivanovo Oblast Location within Russia
- Coordinates: 56°45′N 40°00′E
- Country: Russia
- Region: Ivanovo Oblast
- District: Gavrilovo-Posadsky District
- Time zone: UTC+3:00

Petryaikha (Russian: Петряиха) is a rural locality (a village) in Gavrilovo-Posadsky District, Ivanovo Oblast, Russia. Population: 9 (2010 census);

== Geography ==
This rural locality is located 22 km from Gavrilov Posad (the district's administrative centre), 64 km from Ivanovo (capital of Ivanovo Oblast) and 183 km from Moscow. Novaya is the nearest rural locality.
