= Glumovo, Ivanovo Oblast =

Glumovo Глумово
- Selo
- Location within Ivanovo Oblast Location within Russia
- Coordinates: 56°36′N 39°58′E
- Country: Russia
- Region: Ivanovo Oblast
- District: Gavrilovo-Posadsky District
- Time zone: UTC+3:00

Glumovo (Russian: Глумово) is a rural locality (a selo) in Gavrilovo-Posadsky District, Ivanovo Oblast, Russia. Population: 105 (2010 census);

== Geography ==
This rural locality is located 11 km from Gavrilov Posad (the district's administrative centre), 74 km from Ivanovo (capital of Ivanovo Oblast) and 173 km from Moscow. Gribanovo is the nearest rural locality.
