= Krutitsy, Gavrilovo-Posadsky District, Ivanovo Oblast =

Krutitsy Крутицы
- Selo
- Location within Ivanovo Oblast Location within Russia
- Coordinates: 56°35′N 40°21′E
- Country: Russia
- Region: Ivanovo Oblast
- District: Gavrilovo-Posadsky District
- Time zone: UTC+3:00

Krutitsy (Russian: Крутицы) is a rural locality (a selo) in Gavrilovo-Posadsky District, Ivanovo Oblast, Russia. Population: 15 (2010 census);

== Geography ==
This rural locality is located 15 km from Gavrilov Posad (the district's administrative centre), 58 km from Ivanovo (capital of Ivanovo Oblast) and 192 km from Moscow. Nikulskoye is the nearest rural locality.
