= Lokhvitsy, Amur Oblast =

Lokhvitsy Лохвицы
- Selo
- Location within Amur Oblast Location within Russia
- Coordinates: 50°44′N 128°12′E
- Country: Russia
- Region: Amur Oblast
- District: Belogorsky District
- Time zone: UTC+9:00

Lokhvitsy (Russian: Лохвицы) is a rural locality (a selo) and the administrative center of Lokhvitsky Selsoviet of Belogorsky District, Amur Oblast, Russia. The population was 589 as of 2018. There are 9 streets.

== Geography ==
Lokhvitsy is located 36 km southwest of Belogorsk (the district's administrative centre) by road. Savelyevka is the nearest rural locality.
