= Lipovaya Roshcha =

Lipovaya Roshcha Липовая Роща
- Selo
- Location within Ivanovo Oblast Location within Russia
- Coordinates: 56°38′N 40°16′E
- Country: Russia
- Region: Ivanovo Oblast
- District: Gavrilovo-Posadsky District
- Time zone: UTC+3:00

Lipovaya Roshcha (Russian: Липовая Роща) is a rural locality (a selo) in Gavrilovo-Posadsky District, Ivanovo Oblast, Russia. Population: 1,014 (2010 census);

== Geography ==
This rural locality is located 12 km from Gavrilov Posad (the district's administrative centre), 58 km from Ivanovo (capital of Ivanovo Oblast) and 189 km from Moscow. Putyatino is the nearest rural locality.
