= Vasilevo, Gavrilovo-Posadsky District, Ivanovo Oblast =

Vasilevo Василево
- Village
- Location within Ivanovo Oblast Location within Russia
- Coordinates: 56°49′N 39°55′E
- Country: Russia
- Region: Ivanovo Oblast
- District: Gavrilovo-Posadsky District
- Time zone: UTC+3:00

Vasilevo (Russian: Василево) is a rural locality (a village) in Gavrilovo-Posadsky District, Ivanovo Oblast, Russia. Population: 6 (2010 census);

== Geography ==
This rural locality is located 32 km from Gavrilov Posad (the district's administrative centre), 66 km from Ivanovo (capital of Ivanovo Oblast) and 184 km from Moscow. Gribchikha is the nearest rural locality.
