= Novosyolka, Gavrilovo-Posadsky District, Ivanovo Oblast =

Novosyolka Новосёлка
- Selo
- Location within Ivanovo Oblast Location within Russia
- Coordinates: 56°37′N 40°01′E
- Country: Russia
- Region: Ivanovo Oblast
- District: Gavrilovo-Posadsky District
- Time zone: UTC+3:00

Novosyolka (Russian: Новосёлка) is a rural locality (a selo) in Gavrilovo-Posadsky District, Ivanovo Oblast, Russia. Population: 350 (2010 census);

== Geography ==
This rural locality is located 9 km from Gavrilov Posad (the district's administrative centre), 71 km from Ivanovo (capital of Ivanovo Oblast) and 176 km from Moscow. Dubrovka is the nearest rural locality.
