= Ozeryane =

Ozeryane Озеряне
- Selo
- Location within Amur Oblast Location within Russia
- Coordinates: 50°38′N 128°44′E
- Country: Russia
- Region: Amur Oblast
- District: Belogorsky District
- Time zone: UTC+9:00

Ozeryane (Russian: Озеряне) is a rural locality (a selo) in Ozeryansky Selsoviet of Belogorsky District, Amur Oblast, Russia. The population was 105 as of 2018. There is 1 street.

== Geography ==
Ozeryane is located on the right bank of the Belaya River, 55 km southeast of Belogorsk (the district's administrative centre) by road. Zarechnoye is the nearest rural locality.
