= Novonazarovka =

Novonazarovka Новоназаровка
- Selo
- Location within Amur Oblast Location within Russia
- Coordinates: 50°41′N 128°27′E
- Country: Russia
- Region: Amur Oblast
- District: Belogorsky District
- Time zone: UTC+9:00

Novonazarovka (Russian: Новоназаровка) is a rural locality (a selo) in Nekrasovsky Selsoviet of Belogorsky District, Amur Oblast, Russia. The population was 40 as of 2018. There are 2 streets.

== Geography ==
Novonazarovka is located 47 km south of Belogorsk (the district's administrative centre) by road. Nekrasovka is the nearest rural locality.
