= Rykovskaya Novoselka =

Rykovskaya Novoselka Рыковская Новоселка
- Selo
- Location within Ivanovo Oblast Location within Russia
- Coordinates: 56°32′N 40°00′E
- Country: Russia
- Region: Ivanovo Oblast
- District: Gavrilovo-Posadsky District
- Time zone: UTC+3:00

Rykovskaya Novoselka (Russian: Рыковская Новоселка) is a rural locality (a selo) in Gavrilovo-Posadsky District, Ivanovo Oblast, Russia. Population: 9 (2010 census);

== Geography ==
This rural locality is located 8 km from Gavrilov Posad (the district's administrative centre), 78 km from Ivanovo (capital of Ivanovo Oblast) and 170 km from Moscow. Rykovo is the nearest rural locality.
