= Serbilovo =

Serbilovo Сербилово
- Selo
- Location within Ivanovo Oblast Location within Russia
- Coordinates: 56°31′N 40°04′E
- Country: Russia
- Region: Ivanovo Oblast
- District: Gavrilovo-Posadsky District
- Time zone: UTC+3:00

Serbilovo (Russian: Сербилово) is a rural locality (a selo) in Gavrilovo-Posadsky District, Ivanovo Oblast, Russia. Population: 200 (2010 census);

== Geography ==
This rural locality is located 5 km from Gavrilov Posad (the district's administrative centre), 75 km from Ivanovo (capital of Ivanovo Oblast) and 173 km from Moscow. Lbovo is the nearest rural locality.
