= Lobtsovo =

Lobtsovo Лобцово
- Selo
- Location within Ivanovo Oblast Location within Russia
- Coordinates: 56°45′N 40°05′E
- Country: Russia
- Region: Ivanovo Oblast
- District: Gavrilovo-Posadsky District
- Time zone: UTC+3:00

Lobtsovo (Russian: Лобцово) is a rural locality (a selo) in Gavrilovo-Posadsky District, Ivanovo Oblast, Russia. Population: 79 (2010 census);

== Geography ==
This rural locality is located 22 km from Gavrilov Posad (the district's administrative centre), 59 km from Ivanovo (capital of Ivanovo Oblast) and 187 km from Moscow. Koshcheyevo is the nearest rural locality.
