= Timerevo, Ivanovo Oblast =

Timerevo Тимерево
- Selo
- Location within Ivanovo Oblast Location within Russia
- Coordinates: 56°39′N 40°13′E
- Country: Russia
- Region: Ivanovo Oblast
- District: Gavrilovo-Posadsky District
- Time zone: UTC+3:00

Timerevo (Russian: Тимерево) is a rural locality (a selo) in Gavrilovo-Posadsky District, Ivanovo Oblast, Russia. Population: 7 (2010 census);

== Geography ==
This rural locality is located 12 km from Gavrilov Posad (the district's administrative centre), 59 km from Ivanovo (capital of Ivanovo Oblast) and 188 km from Moscow. Lipovaya Roshcha is the nearest rural locality.
