= Lbovo =

Lbovo Лбово
- Village
- Location within Ivanovo Oblast Location within Russia
- Coordinates: 56°30′N 40°05′E
- Country: Russia
- Region: Ivanovo Oblast
- District: Gavrilovo-Posadsky District
- Time zone: UTC+3:00

Lbovo (Russian: Лбово) is a rural locality (a village) in Gavrilovo-Posadsky District, Ivanovo Oblast, Russia. Population: 12 (2010 census);

== Geography ==
This rural locality is located 6 km from Gavrilov Posad (the district's administrative centre), 76 km from Ivanovo (capital of Ivanovo Oblast) and 173 km from Moscow. Shipovo-Slobodka is the nearest rural locality.
