= Mankovo, Ivanovo Oblast =

Mankovo Маньково
- Village
- Location within Ivanovo Oblast Location within Russia
- Coordinates: 56°35′N 40°13′E
- Country: Russia
- Region: Ivanovo Oblast
- District: Gavrilovo-Posadsky District
- Time zone: UTC+3:00

Mankovo (Russian: Маньково) is a rural locality (a village) in Gavrilovo-Posadsky District, Ivanovo Oblast, Russia. Population: 11 (2010 census);

== Geography ==
This rural locality is located 7 km from Gavrilov Posad (the district's administrative centre), 64 km from Ivanovo (capital of Ivanovo Oblast) and 184 km from Moscow. Krasnopolyansky is the nearest rural locality.
