= Teryayevo, Ivanovo Oblast =

Teryayevo Теряево
- Village
- Location within Ivanovo Oblast Location within Russia
- Coordinates: 56°38′N 40°00′E
- Country: Russia
- Region: Ivanovo Oblast
- District: Gavrilovo-Posadsky District
- Time zone: UTC+3:00

Teryayevo (Russian: Теряево) is a rural locality (a village) in Gavrilovo-Posadsky District, Ivanovo Oblast, Russia. Population: 7 (2010 census);

== Geography ==
This rural locality is located 12 km from Gavrilov Posad (the district's administrative centre), 70 km from Ivanovo (capital of Ivanovo Oblast) and 177 km from Moscow. Bribanovo is the nearest rural locality.
