= Stepurino =

Stepurino Степурино
- Village
- Location within Vologda Oblast Location within Russia
- Coordinates: 58°56′N 40°02′E
- Country: Russia
- Region: Vologda Oblast
- District: Gryazovetsky District
- Time zone: UTC+3:00

Stepurino (Russian: Степурино) is a rural locality (a village) in Yurovskoye Rural Settlement, Gryazovetsky District, Vologda Oblast, Russia. The population was 241 as of 2002. There are 2 streets.

== Geography ==
Stepurino is located 16 km northwest of Gryazovets (the district's administrative centre) by road. Novoye is the nearest rural locality.
