= Pechishchi, Ivanovo Oblast =

Pechishchi Печищи
- Selo
- Location within Ivanovo Oblast Location within Russia
- Coordinates: 56°46′N 40°08′E
- Country: Russia
- Region: Ivanovo Oblast
- District: Gavrilovo-Posadsky District
- Time zone: UTC+3:00

Pechishchi (Russian: Печищи) is a rural locality (a selo) in Gavrilovo-Posadsky District, Ivanovo Oblast, Russia. Population: 6 (2010 census);

== Geography ==
This rural locality is located 25 km from Gavrilov Posad (the district's administrative centre), 56 km from Ivanovo (capital of Ivanovo Oblast) and 191 km from Moscow. Mytishchi is the nearest rural locality.
