= Novy, Belgorod Oblast =

Novy Новый
- Settlement
- Location within Belgorod Oblast Location within Russia
- Coordinates: 50°32′13″N 37°36′48″E
- Country: Russia
- Region: Belgorod Oblast
- District: Volokonovsky District
- Time zone: UTC+3:00

Novy (Russian: Новый) is a rural locality (a settlement) in Volokonovsky District, Belgorod Oblast, Russia. The population was 144 as of 2010.

== Geography ==
Novy is located 30 km northwest of Volokonovka (the district's administrative centre) by road. Shidlovka is the nearest rural locality.
