= Novaya, Palekhsky District, Ivanovo Oblast =

Novaya Новая
- Village
- Location within Ivanovo Oblast Location within Russia
- Coordinates: 56°50′N 41°42′E
- Country: Russia
- Region: Ivanovo Oblast
- District: Palekhsky District
- Time zone: UTC+3:00

Novaya (Russian: Новая) is a rural locality (a village) in Palekhsky District, Ivanovo Oblast, Russia. Population: 24 (2010 census);

== Geography ==
This rural locality is located 10 kilometres (6.2 mi) from Palekh (the district's administrative centre), 48 kilometres (30 mi) from Ivanovo (capital of Ivanovo Oblast) and 277 kilometres (172 mi) from Moscow. Moksikha is the nearest rural locality.
