= Novy, Yermekeyevsky District, Republic of Bashkortostan =

Novy Новый
- Selo
- Location within Bashkortostan Location within Russia
- Coordinates: 54°09′N 53°36′E
- Country: Russia
- Region: Bashkortostan
- District: Yermekeyevsky District
- Time zone: UTC+5:00

Novy (Russian: Новый) is a rural locality (a selo) in Beketovsky Selsoviet, Yermekeyevsky District, Bashkortostan, Russia. The population was 313 as of 2010. There are 2 streets.

== Geography ==
Novy is located 33 km southeast of Yermekeyevo (the district's administrative centre) by road. Priyutovo is the nearest rural locality.
