= Novaya, Chagodoshchensky District, Vologda Oblast =

Novaya Новая
- Village
- Location within Vologda Oblast Location within Russia
- Coordinates: 59°08′N 34°58′E
- Country: Russia
- Region: Vologda Oblast
- District: Chagodoshchensky District
- Time zone: UTC+3:00

Novaya (Russian: Новая) is a rural locality (a village) in Pervomayskoye Rural Settlement, Chagodoshchensky District, Vologda Oblast, Russia. The population was 4 as of 2002.

== Geography ==
Novaya is located 32 km (20 mi) west of Chagoda (the district's administrative centre) by road. Ignashino is the nearest rural locality.
