= Novoye, Kaduysky District, Vologda Oblast =

Novoye Новое
- Village
- Location within Vologda Oblast Location within Russia
- Coordinates: 59°21′N 37°09′E
- Country: Russia
- Region: Vologda Oblast
- District: Kaduysky District
- Time zone: UTC+3:00

Novoye (Russian: Новое) is a rural locality (a village) in Nikolskoye Rural Settlement, Kaduysky District, Vologda Oblast, Russia. The population was 68 as of 2002.

== Geography ==
Novoye is located 25 km north of Kaduy (the district's administrative centre) by road. Nikolskoye is the nearest rural locality.
