= Novoye, Kolchuginsky District, Vladimir Oblast =

Novoye Новое
- Selo
- Location within Vladimir Oblast Location within Russia
- Coordinates: 56°22′N 39°21′E
- Country: Russia
- Region: Vladimir Oblast
- District: Kolchuginsky District
- Time zone: UTC+3:00

Novoye (Russian: Новое) is a rural locality (a selo) in Ilyinskoye Rural Settlement, Kolchuginsky District, Vladimir Oblast, Russia. The population was 17 as of 2010.

== Geography ==
Novoye is located 13 km north of Kolchugino (the district's administrative centre) by road. Ilyinskoye is the nearest rural locality.
