= Novoye, Suzdalsky District, Vladimir Oblast =

Novoye Новое
- Selo
- Location within Vladimir Oblast Location within Russia
- Coordinates: 56°12′N 40°31′E
- Country: Russia
- Region: Vladimir Oblast
- District: Suzdalsky District
- Time zone: UTC+3:00

Novoye (Russian: Новое) is a rural locality (a selo) in Bogolyubovskoye Rural Settlement, Suzdalsky District, Vladimir Oblast, Russia. The population was 1,783 as of 2010. There are 32 streets.

== Geography ==
Novoye is located 2 km west of Suzdal (the district's administrative centre) by road. Suzdal is the nearest rural locality.
