= Novy, Vinogradovsky District, Arkhangelsk Oblast =

Novy Новый
- Settlement
- Location within Arkhangelsk Oblast Location within Russia
- Coordinates: 62°55′N 42°35′E
- Country: Russia
- Region: Arkhangelsk Oblast
- District: Vinogradovsky District
- Time zone: UTC+3:00

Novy (Russian: Новый) is a rural locality (a settlement) in Vinogradovsky District, Arkhangelsk Oblast, Russia. The population was 4 as of 2010.

== Geography ==
Novy is located on the Severnaya Dvina River, 11 km northwest of Bereznik (the district's administrative centre) by road. Pyanda is the nearest rural locality.
