= Novoye, Belgorod Oblast =

Novoye Новое
- Selo
- Location within Belgorod Oblast Location within Russia
- Coordinates: 50°22′N 37°33′E
- Country: Russia
- Region: Belgorod Oblast
- District: Volokonovsky District
- Time zone: UTC+3:00

Novoye (Russian: Новое) is a rural locality (a selo) in Volokonovsky District, Belgorod Oblast, Russia. The population was 281 as of 2010. There are 3 streets.

== Geography ==
Novoye is located 36 km southwest of Volokonovka (the district's administrative centre) by road. Tishanka is the nearest rural locality.
