= Novaya, Ustyuzhensky District, Vologda Oblast =

Novaya Новая
- Village
- Location within Vologda Oblast Location within Russia
- Coordinates: 58°57′N 35°48′E
- Country: Russia
- Region: Vologda Oblast
- District: Ustyuzhensky District
- Time zone: UTC+3:00

Novaya (Russian: Новая) is a rural locality (a village) in Mezzhenskoye Rural Settlement, Ustyuzhensky District, Vologda Oblast, Russia. The population was 35 as of 2002.

== Geography ==
Novaya is located 44 km (27 mi) northwest of Ustyuzhna (the district's administrative centre) by road. Savino is the nearest rural locality.
