= Novy, Sokolsky District, Vologda Oblast =

Novy Новый
- Settlement
- Location within Vologda Oblast Location within Russia
- Coordinates: 59°40′N 40°32′E
- Country: Russia
- Region: Vologda Oblast
- District: Sokolsky District
- Time zone: UTC+3:00

Novy (Russian: Новый) is a rural locality (a settlement) in Dvinitskoye Rural Settlement, Sokolsky District, Vologda Oblast, Russia. The population was 60 as of 2002.

== Geography ==
The distance to Sokol is 40.5 km, to Chekshino is 2.5 km. Shadrino is the nearest rural locality.
