= Novy, Iglinsky District, Republic of Bashkortostan =

Novy Новый
- Village
- Location within Bashkortostan Location within Russia
- Coordinates: 54°51′N 56°49′E
- Country: Russia
- Region: Bashkortostan
- District: Iglinsky District
- Time zone: UTC+5:00

Novy (Russian: Новый) is a rural locality (a village) in Nadezhdinsky Selsoviet, Iglinsky District, Bashkortostan, Russia. The population was 31 as of 2010. There is 1 street.

== Geography ==
Novy is located 43 km east of Iglino (the district's administrative centre) by road. Urman is the nearest rural locality.
