= Novy, Pervomaysky District, Altai Krai =

Novy Новый
- Settlement
- Location within Altai Krai Location within Russia
- Coordinates: 53°22′N 84°00′E
- Country: Russia
- Region: Altai Krai
- District: Pervomaysky District
- Time zone: UTC+7:00

Novy (Russian: Новый) is a rural locality (a settlement) in Beryozovsky Selsoviet, Pervomaysky District, Altai Krai, Russia. The population was 400 as of 2013. There are 54 streets.

== Geography ==
Novy is located 10 km east of Novoaltaysk (the district's administrative centre) by road. Solnechnoye is the nearest rural locality.
