= Novy, Kovrovsky District, Vladimir Oblast =

Novy Новый
- Settlement
- Location within Vladimir Oblast Location within Russia
- Coordinates: 56°17′N 41°15′E
- Country: Russia
- Region: Vladimir Oblast
- District: Kovrovsky District
- Time zone: UTC+3:00

Novy (Russian: Новый) is a rural locality (a settlement) and the administrative center of Novoselskoye Rural Settlement, Kovrovsky District, Vladimir Oblast, Russia. The population was 877 as of 2010. There are 3 streets.

== Geography ==
Novy is located 10 km south of Kovrov (the district's administrative centre) by road. Babenki is the nearest rural locality.
