= Novaya, Vozhegodsky District, Vologda Oblast =

Novaya Новая
- Village
- Location within Vologda Oblast Location within Russia
- Coordinates: 60°35′N 40°09′E
- Country: Russia
- Region: Vologda Oblast
- District: Vozhegodsky District
- Time zone: UTC+3:00

Novaya (Russian: Новая) is a rural locality (a village) in Yavengskoye Rural Settlement, Vozhegodsky District, Vologda Oblast, Russia. The population was 18 as of 2002.

== Geography ==
Novaya is located 19 km north of Vozhega (the district's administrative centre) by road. Pozharishche is the nearest rural locality.
