= Novoye, Yuryev-Polsky District, Vladimir Oblast =

Novoye Новое
- Selo
- Location within Vladimir Oblast Location within Russia
- Coordinates: 56°33′N 39°31′E
- Country: Russia
- Region: Vladimir Oblast
- District: Yuryev-Polsky District
- Time zone: UTC+3:00

Novoye (Russian: Новое) is a rural locality (a selo) in Krasnoselskoye Rural Settlement, Yuryev-Polsky District, Vladimir Oblast, Russia. The population was 16 as of 2010.

== Geography ==
Novoye is located 14 km northwest of Yuryev-Polsky (the district's administrative centre) by road. Khvoyny is the nearest rural locality.
