= Novaya, Cherepovetsky District, Vologda Oblast =

Novaya Новая
- Village
- Location within Vologda Oblast Location within Russia
- Coordinates: 58°56′N 38°43′E
- Country: Russia
- Region: Vologda Oblast
- District: Cherepovetsky District
- Time zone: UTC+3:00

Novaya (Russian: Новая) is a rural locality (a village) in Yugskoye Rural Settlement, Cherepovetsky District, Vologda Oblast, Russia. The population was 7 as of 2002.

== Geography ==
The distance to Cherepovets is 76 km (47 mi), to Novoye Domozerovo is 36 km (22 mi). Timovo is the nearest rural locality.
