= Fornosovo =

Fornosovo Форносово
- Urban-type settlement
- Interactive map of Fornosovo
- Location of Fornosovo Fornosovo (Leningrad Oblast)
- Coordinates: 59°34′13″N 30°33′02″E
- Country: Russia
- Federal subject: Leningrad Oblast
- Administrative district: Tosnensky District
- Founded: 1948

Population (2010 Census)
  - Total: 6,408
  - Estimate (2024): 4,590 (−28.4%)

Municipal status
  - Municipal district: Tosnensky Municipal District
  - Urban settlement: Fornosovskoye Urban Settlement
  - Capital of: Fornosovskoye Urban Settlement
- Time zone: UTC+3 (MSK)
- Postal code: 187022
- OKTMO ID: 41648170051
- Website: fornosovo-adm.ru/city/about/

Fornosovo (Russian: Форно́сово) is an urban locality (an urban-type settlement) in Tosnensky District of Leningrad Oblast, Russia, located on the Khennaya River southeast of the town of Pavlovsk. Municipally it is incorporated as Fornosovskoye Urban Settlement, one of the seven urban settlements in the district. Population: 6,408 (2010 census); 4,866 (2002 census); 2,774 (1989 Soviet census).

== History ==
Fornosovo was founded in 1948 to serve peat extraction in the area. On January 18, 1949, it was granted urban-type settlement status.

== Economy ==
=== Industry ===
Currently, there are enterprises of timber, construction, and food industries, as well as sand production. Peat extraction has been discontinued.

=== Transportation ===
Fornosovo is located at the crossing of two railways: one, in the southern direction, connects Saint Petersburg with Veliky Novgorod, and another one, in the western direction, encircles Saint Petersburg from the south and connects Ulyanovka and Tosno with Gatchina and Kingisepp. There are two railway stations in the settlement: Novolisino railway station serves both railways, whereas 46 km railway platform is located in the southern part of the settlement and serves only the Novgorod direction.

The settlement is connected by roads with Saint Petersburg via Pavlovsk in the north and with the A120 highway which encircles Saint Petersburg in the south.

=== Correction facilities ===
Fornosovo has two correction facilities.

== Culture and recreation ==
The monument to the pilot Mikhail Sharonov who died by bumping his fighter into a German convoy in 1944 is protected as a historical monument. Close to Fornosovo, in the village of Novolisino, the park of the former estate of Knyazhe-Lisino is protected as a cultural monument of local significance. No buildings of the estate survived.
