= Novy, Suzdalsky District, Vladimir Oblast =

Novy Новый
- Settlement
- Location within Vladimir Oblast Location within Russia
- Coordinates: 56°25′N 40°25′E
- Country: Russia
- Region: Vladimir Oblast
- District: Suzdalsky District
- Time zone: UTC+3:00

Novy (Russian: Новый) is a rural locality (a settlement) in Seletskoye Rural Settlement, Suzdalsky District, Vladimir Oblast, Russia. The population was 1,359 as of 2010. There are 5 streets.

== Geography ==
Novy is located 2 km west of Suzdal (the district's administrative centre) by road. Suzdal is the nearest rural locality.
