= Novy, Volgograd Oblast =

Novy Новый
- Khutor
- Location within Volgograd Oblast Location within Russia
- Coordinates: 49°41′N 46°50′E
- Country: Russia
- Region: Volgograd Oblast
- District: Pallasovsky District
- Time zone: UTC+4:00

Novy (Russian: Новый) is a rural locality (a khutor) in Kaysatskoye Rural Settlement, Pallasovsky District, Volgograd Oblast, Russia. The population was 66 as of 2010. There are 2 streets.

== Geography ==
Novy is located in steppe, on the Caspian Depression, 47 km south of Pallasovka (the district's administrative centre) by road. Kaysatskoye is the nearest rural locality.
