= Novaya, Republic of Bashkortostan =

Novaya Новая
- Village
- Location within Bashkortostan Location within Russia
- Coordinates: 54°28′N 55°31′E
- Country: Russia
- Region: Bashkortostan
- District: Chishminsky District
- Time zone: UTC+5:00

Novaya (Russian: Новая; Bashkir: Яңауыл, Yañawıl) is a rural locality (a village) in Arslanovsky Selsoviet, Chishminsky District, Bashkortostan, Russia. The village has 9 streets and, as of 2010, a population of 358.

== Geography ==
Novaya is located 18 km north of Chishmy, the district's administrative seat. Aminevo is the nearest rural locality.
