= Shidlovka =

Shidlovka Шидловка
- Selo
- Location within Belgorod Oblast Location within Russia
- Coordinates: 50°31′N 37°37′E
- Country: Russia
- Region: Belgorod Oblast
- District: Volokonovsky District
- Time zone: UTC+3:00

Shidlovka (Russian: Шидловка) is a rural locality (a selo) and the administrative center of Shidlovskoye Rural Settlement, Volokonovsky District, Belgorod Oblast, Russia. The population was 321 as of 2010. There are 8 streets.

== Geography ==
Shidlovka is located 29 km northwest of Volokonovka (the district's administrative centre) by road. Novoalexandrovka is the nearest rural locality.
