= Novy, Kalmansky District, Altai Krai =

Novy Новый
- Settlement
- Location within Altai Krai Location within Russia
- Coordinates: 53°10′N 83°31′E
- Country: Russia
- Region: Altai Krai
- District: Kalmansky District
- Time zone: UTC+7:00

Novy (Russian: Новый) is a rural locality (a settlement) in Zimaryovsky Selsoviet, Kalmansky District, Altai Krai, Russia. The population was 205 as of 2013. There are 7 streets.

== Geography ==
Novy is located 40 km north of Kalmanka (the district's administrative centre) by road. Prudskoy and Zimari are the nearest rural localities.
