= Novaya, Yuryev-Polsky District, Vladimir Oblast =

Novaya Новая
- Village
- Location within Vladimir Oblast Location within Russia
- Coordinates: 56°20′N 39°45′E
- Country: Russia
- Region: Vladimir Oblast
- District: Yuryev-Polsky District
- Time zone: UTC+3:00

Novaya (Russian: Новая) is a rural locality (a village) in Krasnoselskoye Rural Settlement, Yuryev-Polsky District, Vladimir Oblast, Russia. The population was 3 as of 2010.

== Geography ==
Novaya is located on the Chyornaya River, 21 km south of Yuryev-Polsky (the district's administrative centre) by road. Vyzhegsha is the nearest rural locality.
