= Novaya, Sudogodsky District, Vladimir Oblast =

Novaya Новая
- Village
- Location within Vladimir Oblast Location within Russia
- Coordinates: 55°52′N 41°10′E
- Country: Russia
- Region: Vladimir Oblast
- District: Sudogodsky District
- Time zone: UTC+3:00

Novaya (Russian: Новая) is a rural locality (a village) in Andreyevskoye Rural Settlement, Sudogodsky District, Vladimir Oblast, Russia. The population was 249 as of 2010. There are 4 streets.

== Geography ==
Novaya is located 25 km southeast of Sudogda (the district's administrative centre) by road. Mostishchi is the nearest rural locality.
