= Novy, Permsky District, Perm Krai =

Novy Новый
- Settlement
- Location within Perm Krai Location within Russia
- Coordinates: 57°33′N 55°41′E
- Country: Russia
- Region: Perm Krai
- District: Permsky District
- Time zone: UTC+5:00

Novy (Russian: Новый) is a rural locality (a settlement) in Yugo-Kamskoye Rural Settlement, Permsky District, Perm Krai, Russia. The population was 552 as of 2010. There are 9 streets.

== Geography ==
Novy is located 74 km southwest of Perm (the district's administrative centre) by road. Rozhdestvenskoye is the nearest rural locality.
