= Novoye, Kovrovsky District, Vladimir Oblast =

Novoye Новое
- Selo
- Location within Vladimir Oblast Location within Russia
- Coordinates: 56°12′N 41°38′E
- Country: Russia
- Region: Vladimir Oblast
- District: Kovrovsky District
- Time zone: UTC+3:00

Novoye (Russian: Новое) is a rural locality (a selo) in Ivanovskoye Rural Settlement, Kovrovsky District, Vladimir Oblast, Russia. The population was 6 as of 2010.

== Geography ==
Novoye is located 39 km southeast of Kovrov (the district's administrative centre) by road. Shchibrovo is the nearest rural locality.
