= Novoye, Mezhdurechensky District, Vologda Oblast =

Novoye Новое
- Selo
- Location within Vologda Oblast Location within Russia
- Coordinates: 59°14′N 40°39′E
- Country: Russia
- Region: Vologda Oblast
- District: Mezhdurechensky District
- Time zone: UTC+3:00

Novoye (Russian: Новое) is a rural locality (a selo) in Staroselskoye Rural Settlement, Mezhdurechensky District, Vologda Oblast, Russia. The population was 2 as of 2002.

== Geography ==
Novoye is located 33 km southwest of Shuyskoye (the district's administrative centre) by road. Yaskino is the nearest rural locality.
