= Tom (Amur Oblast) =

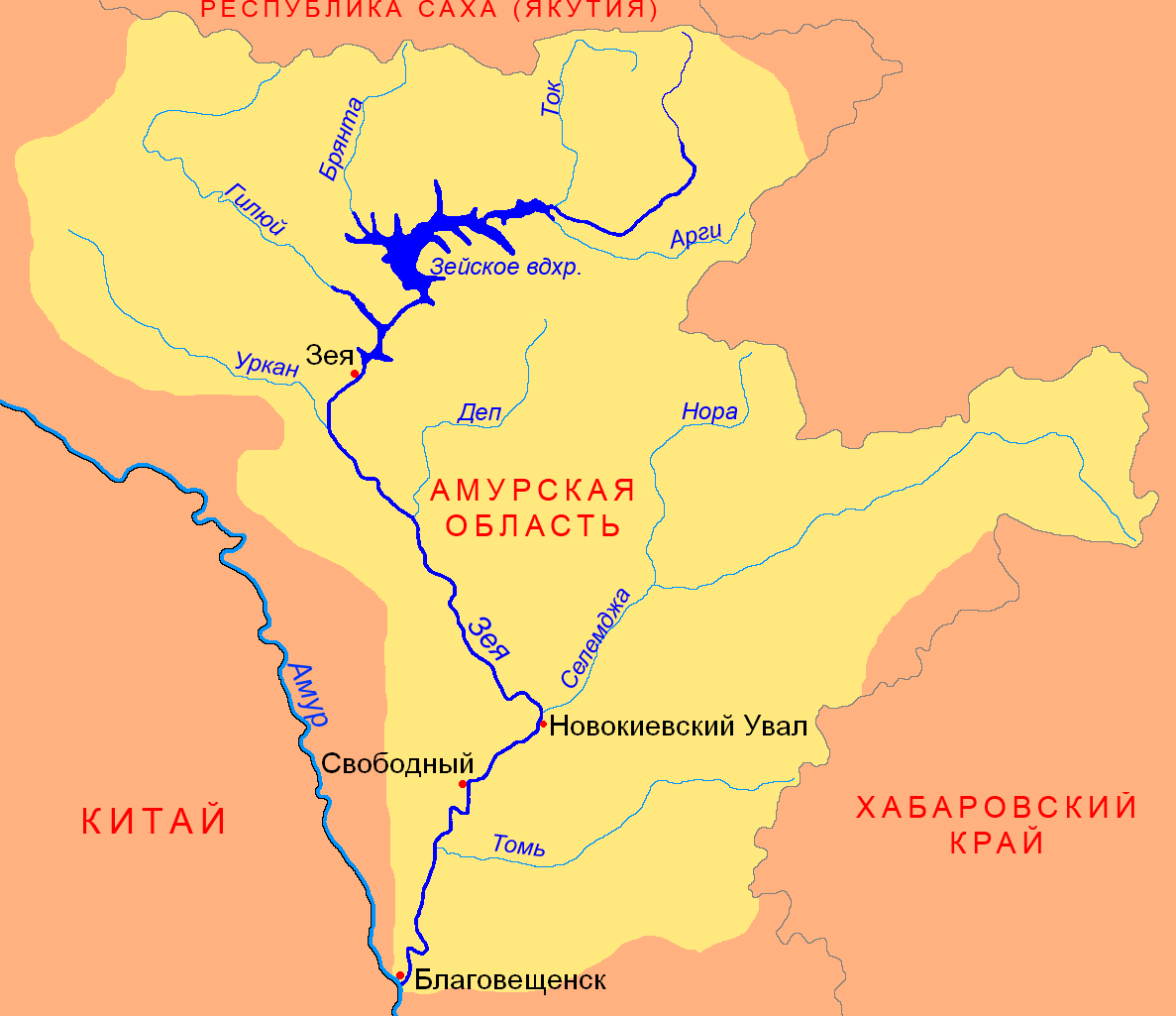
- Zeya basin

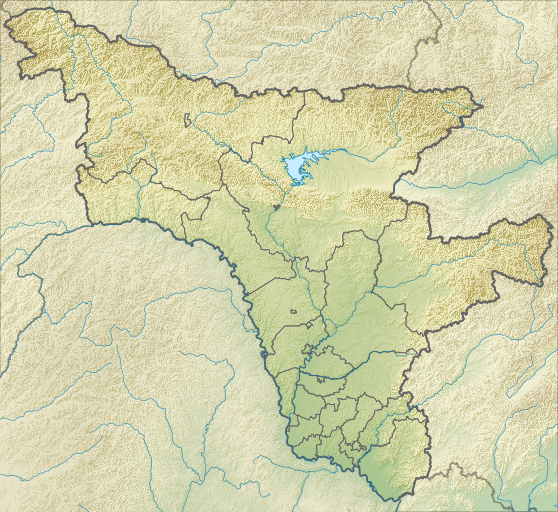
- Mouth location in Amur Oblast, Russia

Location
- Country: Russia

Physical characteristics
- Mouth: Zeya
  - coordinates: 51.0186°N 127.8873°E
- Length: 433 km (269 mi)
- Basin size: 16,000 km^{2} (6,200 sq mi)

Basin features
- Progression: Zeya→ Amur→ Sea of Okhotsk

The Tom (Russian: Томь) is a river in Russia, a left tributary of the river Zeya. It is 433 kilometres (269 mi) long, and has a drainage basin of 16,000 square kilometres (6,200 sq mi). Its source is near the border between Amur Oblast and Khabarovsk Krai. It flows into the Zeya (itself a tributary of the Amur) between Svobodny and Blagoveshchensk. The city of Belogorsk lies on the Tom.

== See also ==
- List of rivers of Russia
