= Belogorsk, Amur Oblast =

Town in Amur Oblast, Russia

Belogorsk Белогорск
- Town
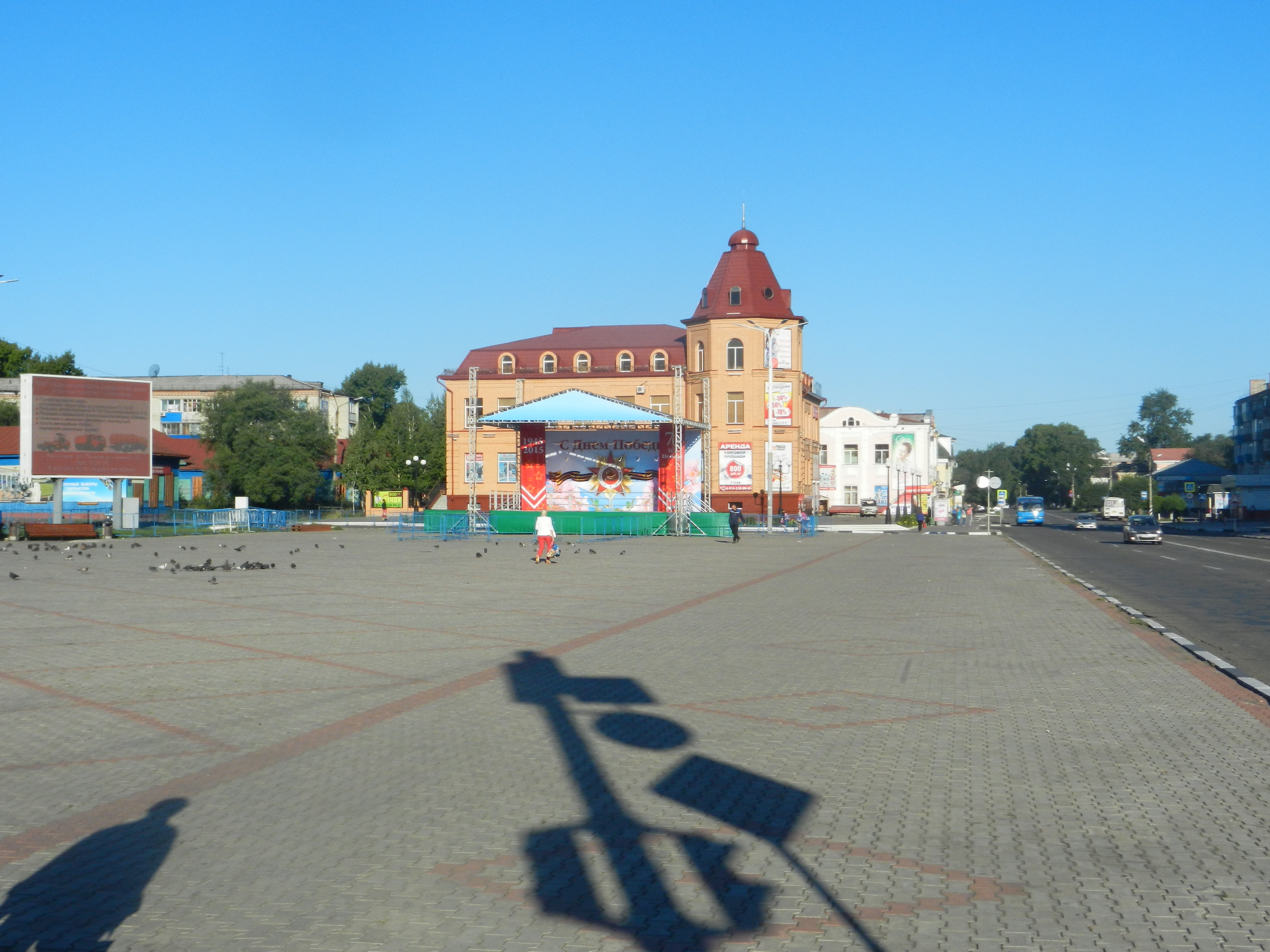
- Center of the city during the May Day (holiday)

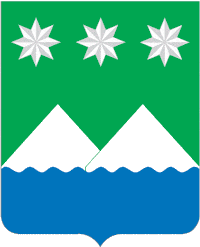
- Flag Coat of arms
- Interactive map of Belogorsk
- Location of Belogorsk Belogorsk (Amur Oblast)
- Coordinates: 50°55′N 128°28′E
- Country: Russia
- Federal subject: Amur Oblast
- Founded: 1860
- Town status since: 1926
- Elevation: 170 m (560 ft)

Population (2010 Census)
  - Total: 68,249
  - Estimate (2025): 59,901 (−12.2%)
  - Rank: 229th in 2010

Administrative status
  - Subordinated to: Belogorsk Urban Okrug
  - Capital of: Belogorsk Urban Okrug, Belogorsky District

Municipal status
  - Urban okrug: Belogorsk Urban Okrug
  - Capital of: Belogorsk Urban Okrug, Belogorsky Municipal District
- Time zone: UTC+9 (MSK+6)
- Postal codes: 676805, 676845, 676846, 676850, 676852–676856, 676859, 676860, 676862–676865, 676869
- Dialing code: +7 41641
- OKTMO ID: 10710000001
- Website: www.belogorck.ru

Belogorsk (Russian: Белогорск) is a town in Amur Oblast, Russia, located on the river Tom, a tributary of the Zeya. Population: 68,249 (2010 census); 67,422 (2002 census); 73,435 (1989 Soviet census); 53,000 (1969); 34,000 (1939).

The town was previously known as Alexandrovskoye (until 1926), Alexandrovsk (until 1931), Krasnopartizansk (until 1935), Kuybyshevka Vostochnaya (until 1957).

== History ==
The selo of Alexandrovskoye (Алекса́ндровское) was founded in 1860 by the settlers from the European part of Russia. In 1893, the selo of Bochkaryovka (Бочкарёвка) appeared nearby. The two localities grew with the construction of a station on the Trans-Siberian Railway in 1913, and by 1923 Alexandrovskoye and Bochkarevka merged and were transformed into Alexandrovsk (Алекса́ндровск). Town status was granted to Alexandrovsk in 1926. In 1931, it was renamed Krasnopartizansk (Краснопартиза́нск), then, in 1935, Kuybyshevka-Vostochnaya (Ку́йбышевка-Восто́чная), to commemorate the Soviet statesman Valerian Kuybyshev. In 1957, possibly to reduce the number of localities named after Kuybyshev, the town was given its present name. While the literal meaning of the name is white mountains, the reasons for renaming are unclear, as the town stands on a plain with no "white mountains" anywhere in the vicinity. It is possible, however, that the name was due to the whitish color of the quartz sands of the bluffs on the Tom River, or that it was allegorical, with the meaning of a white town.

== Geography ==
=== Climate ===
Belogorsk saw a record high temperature for Asian Russia at 42.3 °C (108.1 °F) on 25 June 2010. This record was beaten two days later in Ust-Karsk.

== Administrative and municipal status ==
Within the framework of administrative divisions, Belogorsk serves as the administrative center of Belogorsky District, even though it is not a part of it. As an administrative division, it is, together with one rural locality (the selo of Nizinnoye), incorporated separately as Belogorsk Urban Okrug—an administrative unit with the status equal to that of the districts. As a municipal division, this administrative unit also has urban okrug status.

== Economy ==
Belogorsk is a center for food production, as well as construction products.

== Military ==
The town is home to important military elements of the Eastern Military District, specifically the headquarters of the 35th Army and the 21st Guards Motor Rifle Division. Nearby is the Ukrainka air base, home to elements of Long Range Aviation.

== Notable people ==
- Yevgeni Burdinskiy (born 1960), Russian general
- Sergei Chukhray (born 1955), Soviet sprint canoer
- Svetlana Klyuka (born 1978), Russian middle-distance runner
- Victor Nechayev (born 1955), professional ice hockey player
- Valeriy Priyomykhov (1943–2000), Soviet and Russian actor, film director, screenwriter and author
- Andrey Shary (born 1965), Russian journalist and author
