= Belogorsky District =

Belogorsky District Белогорский район (Russian)
- District
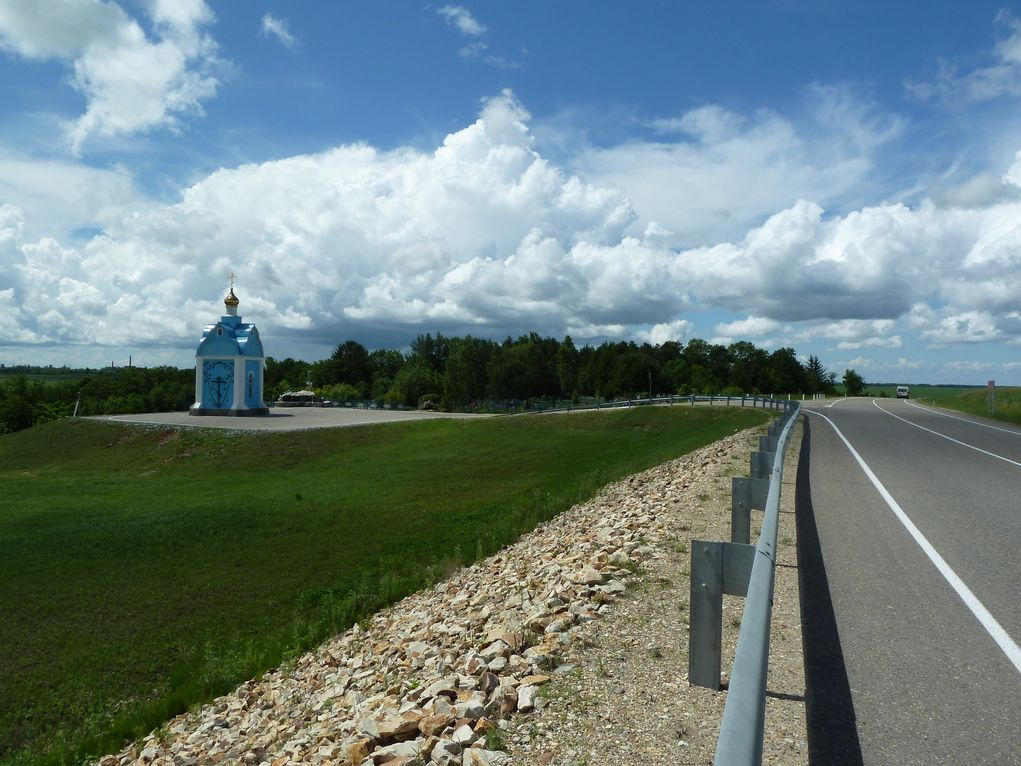
- Road in Belogorsky

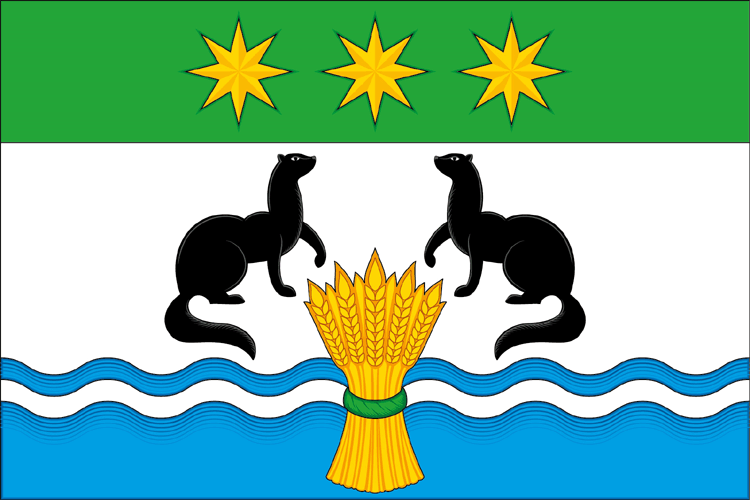
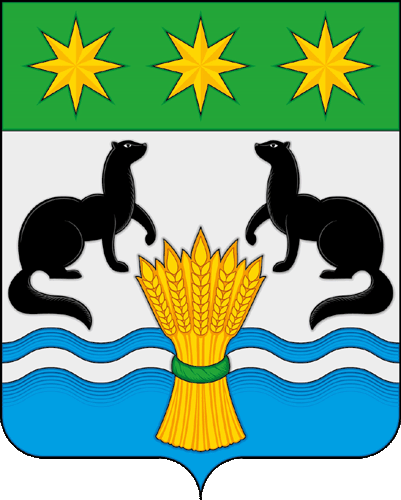
- Flag Coat of arms
- Location of Belogorsky District in Amur Oblast
- Coordinates: 50°55′00″N 128°27′12″E
- Country: Russia
- Federal subject: Amur Oblast
- Established: 4 January 1926
- Administrative center: Belogorsk

Area
  - Total: 2,591 km^{2} (1,000 sq mi)

Population (2010 Census)
  - Total: 20,052
  - Density: 7.739/km^{2} (20.04/sq mi)
  - Urban: 0%
  - Rural: 100%

Administrative structure
  - Administrative divisions: 13 Rural settlements
  - Inhabited localities: 36 rural localities

Municipal structure
  - Municipally incorporated as: Belogorsky Municipal District
  - Municipal divisions: 0 urban settlements, 13 rural settlements
- Time zone: UTC+9 (MSK+6)
- OKTMO ID: 10608000
- Website: http://belraion.ru/

Belogorsky District (Russian: Белого́рский райо́н) is an administrative and municipal district (raion), one of the twenty in Amur Oblast, Russia. The area of the district is 2,591 square kilometers (1,000 sq mi). Its administrative center is the town of Belogorsk (which is not administratively a part of the district). Population: 20,052 (2010 census); 23,848 (2002 Census); 28,648 (1989 Soviet census).

== Administrative and municipal status ==
Within the framework of administrative divisions, Belogorsky District is one of the twenty in the oblast. The town of Belogorsk serves as its administrative center, despite being incorporated separately as an urban okrug—an administrative unit with the status equal to that of the districts.

As a municipal division, the district is incorporated as Belogorsky Municipal District. Belogorsk Urban Okrug is incorporated separately from the district.
