= Gavrilov Posad =

Town in Ivanovo Oblast, Russia

Gavrilov Posad Гаврилов Посад
- Town
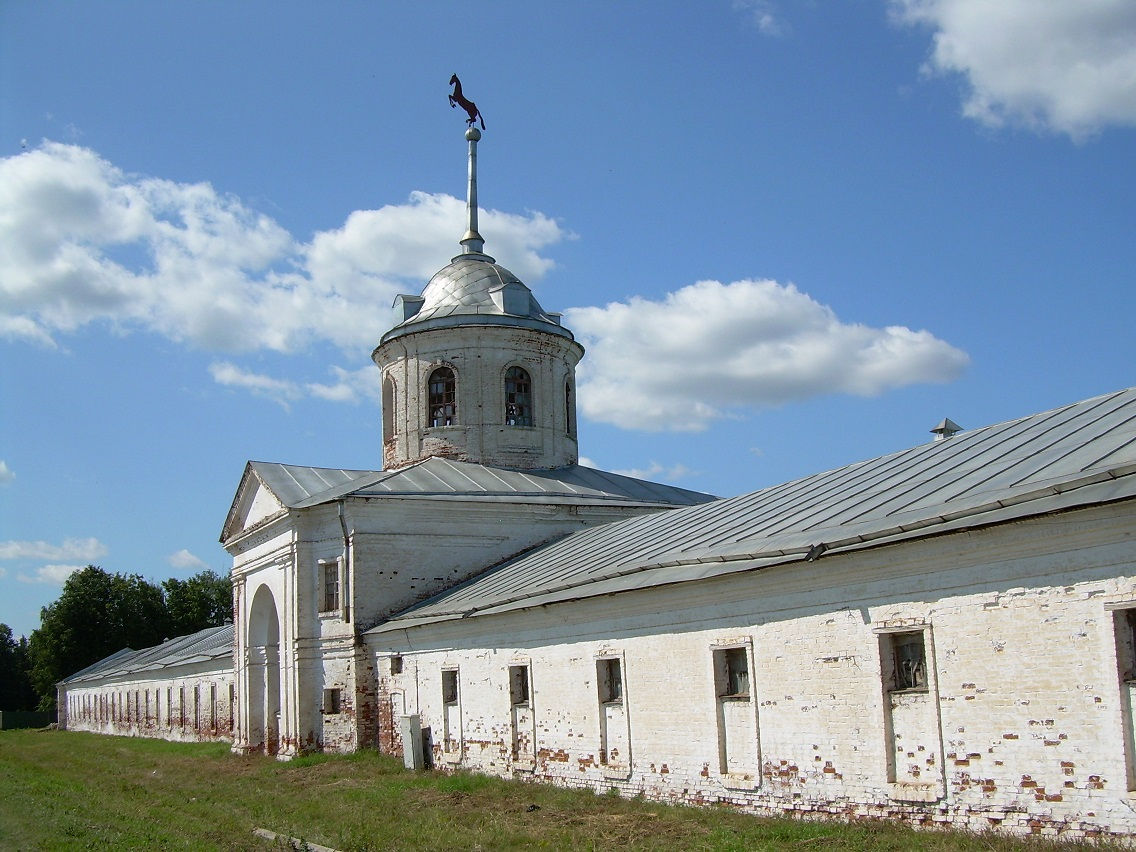
- Horse stables in Gavrilov Posad

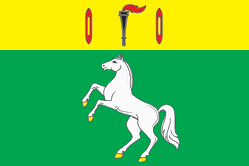
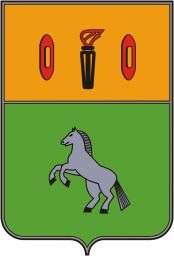
- Flag Coat of arms
- Interactive map of Gavrilov Posad
- Location of Gavrilov Posad Gavrilov Posad (Ivanovo Oblast)
- Coordinates: 56°33′N 40°07′E
- Country: Russia
- Federal subject: Ivanovo Oblast
- Administrative district: Gavrilovo-Posadsky District
- First mentioned: 1434
- Town status since: 1789
- Elevation: 120 m (390 ft)

Population (2010 Census)
  - Total: 6,434
  - Estimate (2021): 5,429 (−15.6%)

Administrative status
  - Capital of: Gavrilovo-Posadsky District

Municipal status
  - Municipal district: Gavrilovo-Posadsky Municipal District
  - Urban settlement: Gavrilovo-Posadskoye Urban Settlement
  - Capital of: Gavrilovo-Posadsky Municipal District, Gavrilovo-Posadskoye Urban Settlement
- Time zone: UTC+3 (MSK)
- Postal code: 155000
- OKTMO ID: 24603101001
- Website: xn----7sbbgadm2aekjh3bbbpk0ac.xn--p1ai

Gavrilov Posad (Russian: Гаври́лов Поса́д) is a town and the administrative center of Gavrilovo-Posadsky District in Ivanovo Oblast, Russia, located on the Voymiga River at its confluence with the Irmes River, 85 kilometers (53 mi) southwest of Ivanovo, the administrative center of the oblast. Population: 5,429 (2021 census); 6,434 (2010 census); 7,193 (2002 census); 8,492 (1989 Soviet census).

It was previously known as Gavrilovskoye (until 1609), Gavrilova Sloboda (until 1789), Gavrilovsky Posad.

== History ==
Gavrilov Posad was first mentioned in a legal document in 1434 as the settlement of Gavrilovskoye. It is believed that it was founded some time in the 13th century by Vsevolod the Big Nest and named after his son Svyatoslav, whose second Christian name was Gavriil. In 1609, the settlement turned into Gavrilova sloboda. In 1789, it was renamed Gavrilovsky Posad and granted town status. It was given its present name in the 20th century.

== Administrative and municipal status ==
Within the framework of administrative divisions, Gavrilov Posad serves as the administrative center of Gavrilovo-Posadsky District, to which it is directly subordinated. Prior to the adoption of the Law #145-OZ On the Administrative-Territorial Division of Ivanovo Oblast in December 2010, it used to be incorporated separately as an administrative unit with the status equal to that of the districts.

As a municipal division, the town of Gavrilov Posad, together with eleven rural localities in Gavrilovo-Posadsky District, is incorporated within Gavrilovo-Posadsky Municipal District as Gavrilovo-Posadskoye Urban Settlement.
