= Gavrilovo-Posadsky District =

Gavrilovo-Posadsky District Гаврилово-Посадский район (Russian)
- District
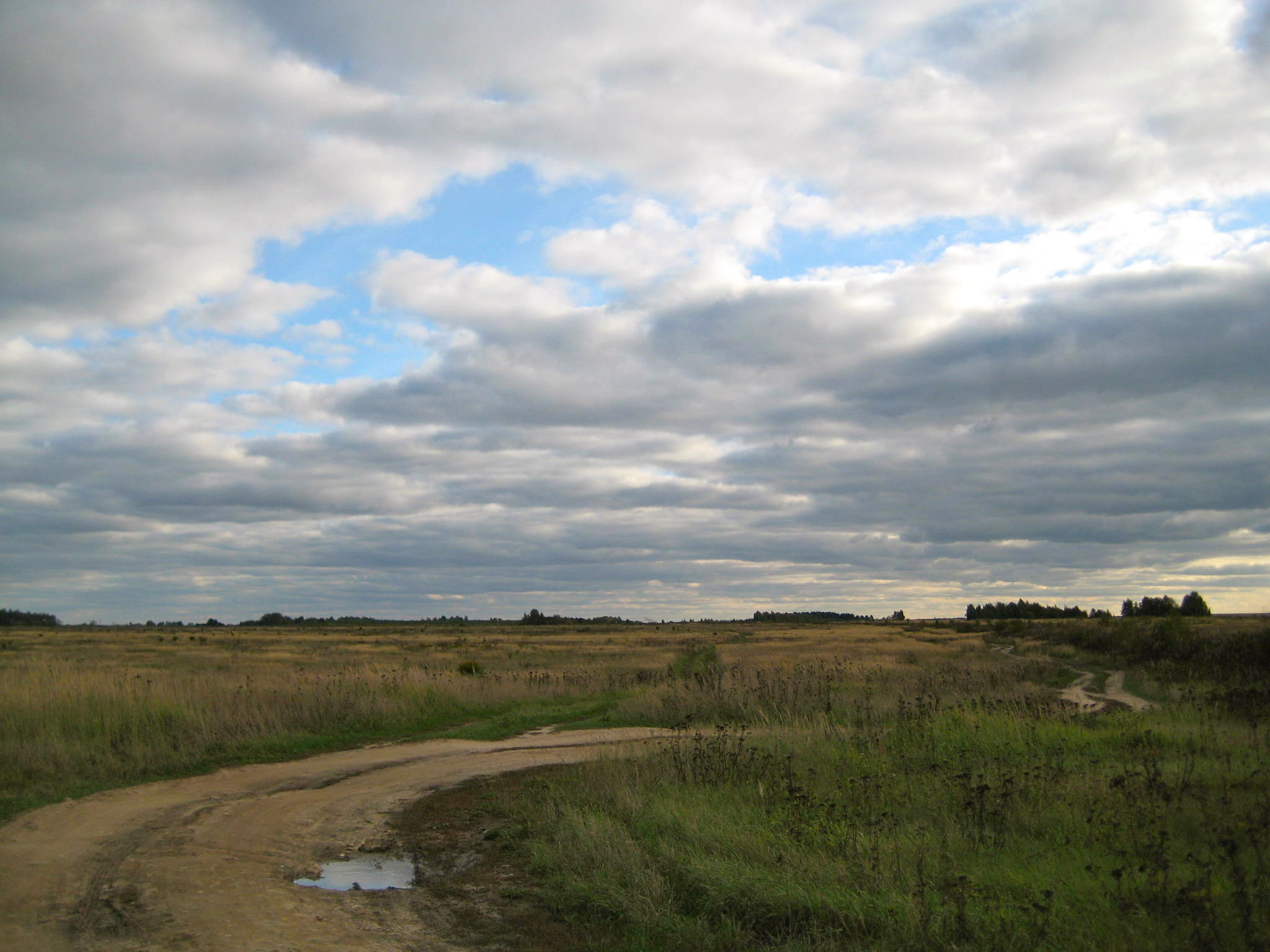
- Landscape in Gavrilo-Posadsky District

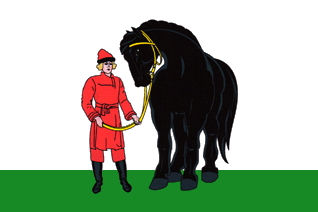
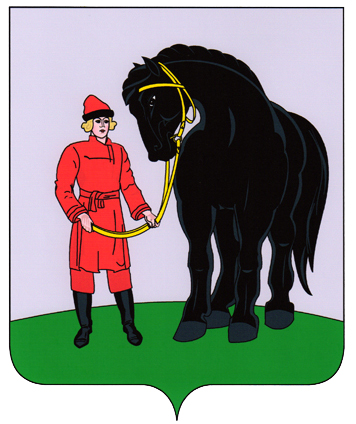
- Flag Coat of arms
- Location of Gavrilovo-Posadsky District in Ivanovo Oblast
- Coordinates: 56°34′N 40°07′E
- Country: Russia
- Federal subject: Ivanovo Oblast
- Established: 10 June 1929
- Administrative center: Gavrilov Posad

Area
  - Total: 960 km^{2} (370 sq mi)

Population (2010 Census)
  - Total: 17,591
  - Density: 18/km^{2} (47/sq mi)
  - Urban: 51.1%
  - Rural: 48.9%

Administrative structure
  - Inhabited localities: 1 cities/towns, 1 urban-type settlements, 85 rural localities

Municipal structure
  - Municipally incorporated as: Gavrilovo-Posadsky Municipal District
  - Municipal divisions: 2 urban settlements, 3 rural settlements
- Time zone: UTC+3 (MSK)
- OKTMO ID: 24603000
- Website: http://www.adm-gavrilovposad.ru/

Gavrilovo-Posadsky District (Russian: Гаври́лово-Поса́дский райо́н) is an administrative and municipal district (raion), one of the twenty-one in Ivanovo Oblast, Russia. It is located in the southwest of the oblast. The area of the district is 960 square kilometers (370 sq mi). Its administrative center is the town of Gavrilov Posad. Population: 12,669 (2021 census); 17,591 (2010 census); 20,430 (2002 Census); 23,334 (1989 Soviet census). The population of Gavrilov Posad accounts for 42.9% of the district's total population.

== Administrative and municipal status ==
The town of Gavrilov Posad serves as the administrative center of the district. Prior to the adoption of the Law #145-OZ On the Administrative-Territorial Division of Ivanovo Oblast in December 2010, it was administratively incorporated separately from the district. Municipally, Gavrilov Posad is incorporated within Gavrilovo-Posadsky Municipal District as Gavrilovo-Posadskoye Urban Settlement.
