= Haplogroup A (mtDNA) =

Human mitochondrial DNA grouping indicating common ancestry

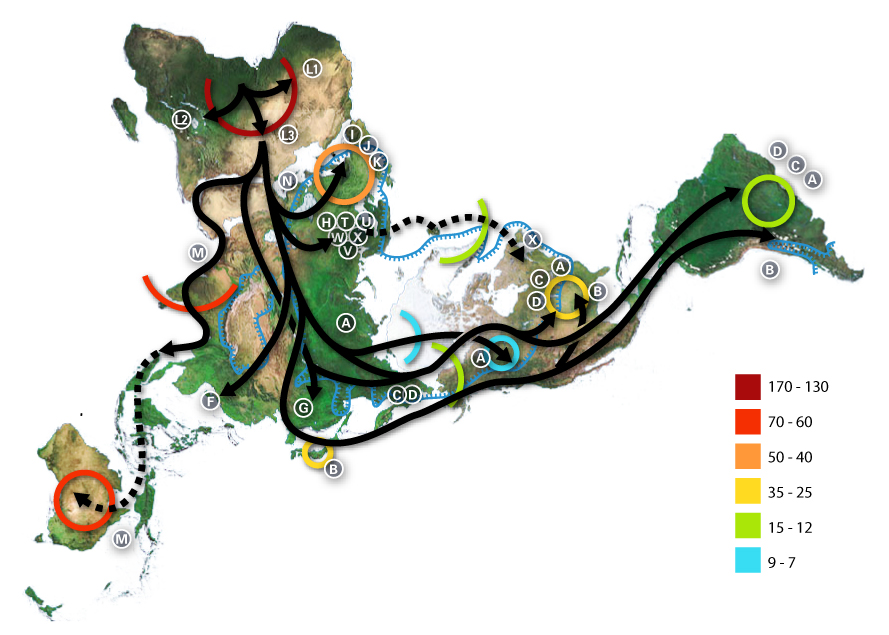
- Possible time of origin: 40,000 ± 10,000 YBP 40,500 (95% CI 37,900 ↔ 43,200) ybp
- Coalescence age: 18,600 (95% CI 14,200 ↔ 23,900) ybp 24,209 (SD 4,906) ybp
- Possible place of origin: East Asia
- Ancestor: N
- Descendants: A3, A4, A5, A7, A8
- Defining mutations: 152, 235, 523-524d, 663, 1736, 4248, 4824, 8794, 16290, 16319

In human mitochondrial genetics, Haplogroup A is a human mitochondrial DNA (mtDNA) haplogroup.

== Origin ==
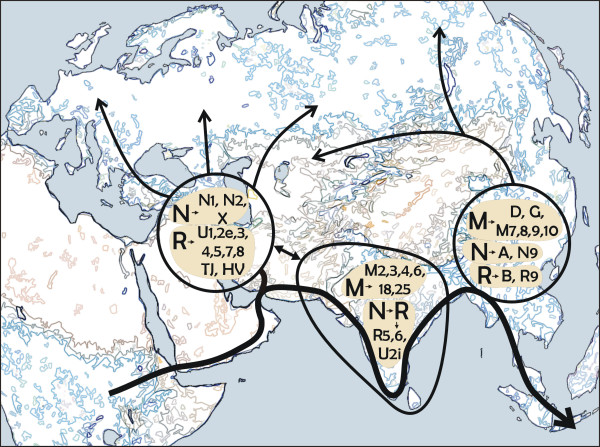
mtDNA-based chart of possible large human migrations.

Haplogroup A is believed to have arisen in Asia some 30,000–50,000 years BC. Its ancestral haplogroup was Haplogroup N. However, the extant diversity of mitochondrial genomes that belong to Haplogroup A is low relative to the degree of divergence from its nearest outgroups in haplogroup N, which suggests that extant members of Haplogroup A might be descended from a population that has emerged from a bottleneck approximately 20,000 years ago.

Its highest frequencies are among Native Americans, its largest overall population is in East Asia, and its greatest variety (which suggests its origin point) is in East Asia. Thus, it might have originated in and spread from the Far East.

== Distribution ==
Its subclade A2 shares a T16362C mutation with subclades A1 (found in Japan, Tashkurgan, Veliky Novgorod, Mongols, and Altaians), A6 (found in Tibet and in the Yangtze River basin), A12'23 (found in Siberia and among Uralic and Turkic peoples), A13'14 (found in southern Siberia, Xinjiang, Ladakh, China, Yunnan, Thailand, and Vietnam), A15 (found in China, Naxi, Uyghur, Japan, and among the Sherpa of Tibet and Nepal), A16 (found in Uyghur, Buryat, Turkey), A17 (found in China, Miao, Yi, Tibet, Ladakh, Kyrgyz, Thailand, and Vietnam), A18 (found in China), A19 (found in China), A20 (found among Han Chinese and in Japan), A21 (found in Tibet and in Jammu and Kashmir), A22 (found in China), A24 (found in Beijing and West Bohemia), A25 (found in Japan and Yakutia), and A26 (found in Denmark). A2 is found in Chukotko–Kamchatka and is also one of five mtDNA haplogroups found in the indigenous peoples of the Americas, the others being B, C, D, and X.

Haplogroup A2 is the most common haplogroup among the Inuit, Na-Dene, and many Amerind ethnic groups of North and Central America. Lineages belonging to haplogroup A2 also comprise the majority of the mtDNA pool of the Inuit and their neighbors, the Chukchis, in northeasternmost Siberia.

Other branches of haplogroup A are less frequent but widespread among other populations of Asia. Haplogroup A5 is rather limited to populations from Korea and Japan southward, though it has been detected as singletons in a pair of large samples of Khamnigans (1/99 = 1.0%) and Buryats (1/295 = 0.3%) from the Buryat Republic.

In Asia, A(xA2) is especially frequent in Tibeto-Burman-speaking populations of Southwest China, such as Tibetans (6/65 = 9.2%, 25/216 = 11.6%, 11/73 = 15.1%). Approximately 7% to 15% of Koreans belong to haplogroup A. Approximately 5% to 12% of the Japanese belong to haplogroup A (including A4, A5, and A(xA4, A5)). Approximately 4% to 13% of Mongols belong to haplogroup A, almost all of whom are contained within the A4 subclade (2/47 = 4.3% Mongolians from Ulaanbaatar in haplogroup A4, 4/48 = 8.3% Mongols from New Barag Left Banner in haplogroup A(xA5), 6/47 = 12.8% Mongolians from Ulaanbaatar in haplogroup A4). Approximately 3% to 9% of Chinese people belong to haplogroup A. Haplogroup A also has been found in Vietnamese (2/42 = 4.8%, including one A4 and one A5(xA5a)). Approximately 4% (3/71) of Tatars from Aznakayevo, 3% (4/126) of Tatars from Buinsk, and 2% of Turkish people belong to haplogroup A. Haplogroup A4 has been found in 2.4% (2/82) of a sample of Persians from eastern Iran and in 2.3% (1/44) of a sample of Tajiks from Tajikistan. Haplogroup A is not found among Austronesians. In Nepalese population except Sherpa, haplogroup A was mirrored by its clades, A27, A14 and A17, of which A27 was the most abundant clade in Newar (3.99%). Newly defined clade A27 only discerned so far in Newar and Nepali-mix coalesce at ~ 8.4 Kya suggesting their ancient origin and potentially in situ differentiation in Nepal.

== Subclades ==
=== Tree ===
This phylogenetic tree of haplogroup A subclades is based on the paper by Mannis van Oven and Manfred Kayser Updated comprehensive phylogenetic tree of global human mitochondrial DNA variation and subsequent published research.

- A
  - A(xA5, A8, A10) — China (Han from Wuhan), Buryat (Inner Mongolia)
    - A+T152C!+T16362C — Uyghur, Korea, Japan, Vietnam (Hmong from Lao Cai Province, Kinh from Hanoi, Cờ Lao)
      - A1 [TMRCA 12,800 (95% CI 6,500 ↔ 22,700) ybp]
        - A1* — Japan, Korea
        - A1a [TMRCA 7,500 (95% CI 4,500 ↔ 11,800) ybp]
          - A1a* — Japan (Aichi), Sarikoli (Tashkurgan), USA, England
          - A1a1 [TMRCA 5,000 (95% CI 2,200 ↔ 9,800) ybp]
            - A1a1* — Buryat, Altai Kizhi
            - A1a1a — Buryat, Mongol (Inner Mongolia) [TMRCA 1,050 (95% CI 75 ↔ 5,500) ybp]
          - A1a2 — Russia (Bashkortostan, Velikij Novgorod), Iran (Turkmen) [TMRCA 1,950 (95% CI 100 ↔ 10,500) ybp]
          - A1a3 — Greece (Ioannina), United States (West Virginia) [TMRCA 1,150 (95% CI 75 ↔ 6,000) ybp]
      - A2 — Ache, Waiwai, Zoro, Surui, Waiapi, Poturujara, Kayapo, Katuena, Guarani, Arsario, Cayapa, Dogrib, ancient Canada, USA (Pennsylvania, California), Mexico (Zapotec), Cuba, Dominican Republic, Colombia, Venezuela, Ecuador, Peru, Argentina [TMRCA 10,600 (95% CI 9,600 ↔ 11,700) ybp]
        - A2a — Eskimo (Greenland, Chukotka), Chukchi
          - A2a1 — Inuit (Canada), Selkup
          - A2a2 — Eskimo (Chukotka), Chukchi
          - A2a3 — Eskimo (Greenland, Canada, Chukotka), Chukchi
          - A2a4 — USA (New Mexico, Arizona), Mexico (Chihuahua)
          - A2a5 — Apache, USA (California, Arizona, New Mexico, Texas), Canada (Cree, Shuswap)
        - A2b — Chukchi
          - A2b1 — Chukchi, Koryak, Eskimo (Chukotka, Canada, Greenland)
        - A2c
        - A2d — USA (Mexican, Hispanic)
          - A2d1 — USA (Mexican)
            - A2d1a — USA (Hispanic)
          - A2d2 — USA (Hispanic)
        - A2e'ao
          - A2e
          - A2ao
            - A2ao1
        - A2f
          - A2f1 — Newfoundland
            - A2f1a — Canada, USA (Native American)
          - A2f2 — USA (Mexican, Hispanic), Mexico
          - A2f3 — USA (Mexican, Hispanic)
        - A2g — USA (Mexican, Hispanic), Mexico
          - A2g1 — USA (Mexican, Hispanic), Latin America
        - A2h — Colombia (Cocama of Amazonas, Arhuaco), Yanomama, Kogui
          - A2h1 — USA (Mexican, Hispanic), Mexico, Latin America
        - A2i — USA (Hispanic, etc.), Canada (Ojibwa, Prince Edward Island, Pabos in Quebec)
        - A2j — USA (Hispanic)
          - A2j1 — USA (Hispanic)
        - A2k — USA (Puerto Rico)
          - A2k1 — Ecuador, Wayuu, Mexico
            - A2k1a — Venezuela, Colombia (Pasto of Putumayo), USA (Hispanic)
        - A2l'm'n'o'ai'aj
          - A2l
          - A2m
          - A2n — Canada
          - A2o
          - A2ai
          - A2aj
        - A2p'am
          - A2p
            - A2p1
            - A2p2
          - A2am — USA (Puerto Rico, Hispanic), Venezuela. One ancient DNA found in Curaçao, in a Dabajuroid (Caquetio) site dating 1160-1500 CE.
        - A2q
          - A2q1
        - A2r — USA (Hispanic, Mexican), Cuba
          - A2r1 — Mexico, USA (Mexican)
        - A2s
        - A2t — USA (Mexican)
        - A2u
          - A2u1
          - A2u2
        - A2v
          - A2v1 — USA (Mexican, Hispanic), Mexico (La Mixteca)
            - A2v1a — Guatemala, USA (Mexican)
            - A2v1b — Mexico
            - A2v1i — USA (Indigenous Coahuiltecan, Mestizo, Mexican, Hispanic), Northern Mexico (Chihuahua, Coahuila, Nuevo León, Tamaulipas) site dating in 600 CE. Modern Generation, there were few individuals found and carried with this haplogroup that is located in the Pacific Northwest.
        - A2w — Colombia (Kogi, Guambiano of Putumayo), Arsario, USA (Mexican, Hispanic)
          - A2w1 — Mexico, Cayman Islands, Guatemala (La Tinta), Panama (Guaymi), Colombia
        - A2x
        - A2y
        - A2z — USA (Hispanic, Puerto Rico)
        - A2aa
        - A2ab - Brazil (PE, MT), Paraguay, Argentina
        - A2ac
          - A2ac1
        - A2ad
          - A2ad1
          - A2ad2
        - A2ae
        - A2af
          - A2af1
            - A2af1a
              - A2af1a1
              - A2af1a2
            - A2af1b
              - A2af1b1
                - A2af1b1a
                - A2af1b1b
              - A2af1b2
          - A2af2
        - A2ag
        - A2ah
        - A2ak
        - A2al
        - A2an
        - A2ap
        - A2aq
      - A6 [TMRCA 12,000 (95% CI 8,600 ↔ 16,100) ybp]
        - A6* — Deng, Korea
        - A6a — China [TMRCA 9,600 (95% CI 5,500 ↔ 15,500) ybp]
          - A6a* — Han Chinese (Wuhan, etc.)
          - A6a1 — Tujia
        - A6b — Tibet [TMRCA 5,000 (95% CI 2,700 ↔ 8,300) ybp]
          - A6b* — Tibet (Chamdo, Ladakh)
          - A6b1 — Tibet (Sherpa)
        - A6c — Tibet (Lhoba, Monpa)
      - A12'23 — Austria, Romania, Poland, Russia, possibly found among Udmurts and Komis
        - A12 — Czech Republic, Germany [TMRCA 11,800 (95% CI 6,500 ↔ 19,700) ybp]
          - A12a — Ireland, UK, New Zealand, USA, Nenets, Selkup [TMRCA 4,700 (95% CI 2,700 ↔ 7,600) ybp]
            - A12a* — Mansi, Yakut (Vilyuy River basin), Kyrgyz (Kyrgyzstan)
            - A12a1 — Kyordyughen Site (Ymyiakhtakh Culture, Yakutia), Hungary (Debrecen) [TMRCA 2,800 (95% CI 1,450 ↔ 4,900) ybp]
            - A12a2 — Evenk (Krasnoyarsk Krai, Stony Tunguska River basin) [TMRCA 1,250 (95% CI 100 ↔ 6,600) ybp]
          - A12b — Buryat, Karos-Eperjesszög (Hungarian conqueror period) [TMRCA 3,000 (95% CI 425 ↔ 10,700) ybp]
        - A23 — Mongol (Inner Mongolia), Buryat, Ket, Qashqai (Iran), ancient Scythian (Chylenski) [TMRCA 6,200 (95% CI 3,300 ↔ 10,600) ybp]
      - A13'14 — Russia (Buryat, Khamnigan), China (Shiyan, Tu, Uyghur, etc.), Ladakh, Thailand, Vietnam (Mang), Korea, Japan, Paraguay (Alto Parana), Ireland
        - A13
          - A13a — Thailand (Khon Mueang from Chiang Rai Province and Lampang Province), China
          - A13b
            - A13b1 — Uyghur, Taiwan
            - A13b2 — China (Lahu, etc.), Thailand (Red Lahu from Mae Hong Son Province), Vietnam (Phù Lá)
              - A13b2a — China (Naxi), Thailand (Lisu from Mae Hong Son Province)
        - A14 — Russia (Altai Kizhi, etc.), Kyrgyz (Artux), Uyghur, China, Han Chinese (Denver), Taiwan, Thailand (Lawa from Chiang Mai Province, Mon from Lopburi Province), Vietnam (Pa Then)
      - A15 — Uyghur
        - A15a — China (Han in Beijing, Lanzhou, etc.), Tibet (Tingri), Uyghur, Japan
        - A15b — China, Japan (Ehime)
        - A15c — China
          - A15c1 — Naxi, Tibet (Sherpa), Nepal (Sherpa)
      - A16 — Buryat, Uyghur, Turk
      - A17 — China (Han from Beijing, Lanzhou, etc.), Miao, Yi, Tibet (Lhoba, Monpa, Tingri), Ladakh, Kyrgyz (Tashkurgan), Thailand (Lawa from Chiang Mai Province and Mae Hong Son Province, Blang from Chiang Rai Province, Mon from Ratchaburi Province), Vietnam (Phù Lá, Hà Nhì)
      - A18 — Japan, China (Han from Fujian, Han from Beijing, Han from Lanzhou), Romania
      - A19 — China (Han from Beijing, etc.)
      - A20 — Japan, Han Chinese (Denver)
      - A21 — Tibet (Sherpa, Deng, etc.), Jammu and Kashmir
      - A22 — China, Han Chinese (Denver)
      - A24 — China (Han in Beijing), Turkey, Czech Republic (West Bohemia)
      - A25 — Japan (Chiba), China, Yakut (Vilyuy River basin)
      - A26 — Denmark
    - A3 — Japan (Tokyo, etc.), Korea, USA [TMRCA 6,800 (95% CI 3,200 ↔ 12,600) ybp]
      - A3a — Japan (Aichi, etc.) [TMRCA 4,300 (95% CI 1,400 ↔ 9,800) ybp]
    - A7 [TMRCA 8,800 (95% CI 5,400 ↔ 13,500) ybp]
      - A7* — China
      - A7a — Tibet [TMRCA 7,000 (95% CI 3,900 ↔ 11,700) ybp]
        - A7a* — Lhoba
        - A7a1 — Lhoba
        - A7a2 — Lhoba, Monpa
      - A7b — Japan (Tokyo, etc.) [TMRCA 6,300 (95% CI 2,100 ↔ 14,700) ybp]
    - A9
    - A11 — Nepal, Korea, Russia [TMRCA 14,500 (95% CI 9,700 ↔ 20,800) ybp]
      - A11a — Tibet (Lhasa, Nyingchi, Tingri, Sherpa, Lhoba, etc.), Ladakh
      - A11b — Tibet (Tingri, Chamdo, etc.), Naxi, Han (Yunnan)
  - A5 — China (incl. Hong Kong), Japan [TMRCA 16,200 (95% CI 11,100 ↔ 22,800) ybp]
    - A5a — Japan (Tokyo, Aichi, etc.), Korea, China [TMRCA 5,500 (95% CI 3,800 ↔ 7,600) ybp]
      - A5a1 — Korea
        - A5a1a — Japan (Tokyo, etc.), Korea
          - A5a1a1 — Japan (Tokyo, Chiba, Aichi, etc.), Korea
            - A5a1a1a — Japan (Tokyo, etc.)
            - A5a1a1b — Japan (Tokyo, Chiba, etc.), Korea
          - A5a1a2 — Japan, Korea
            - A5a1a2a — Japan (Aichi)
        - A5a1b — Japan (Tokyo, Aichi)
      - A5a2 — Japan (Tokyo, Aichi, etc.)
      - A5a3
        - A5a3* — Korea, USA (African American)
        - A5a3a
          - A5a3a* — Japan (Tokyo)
          - A5a3a1 — Japan (Tokyo, Aichi, etc.)
      - A5a4 — Japan
      - A5a5 — Japan, South Korea (Seoul), Uyghur
    - A5b — China (Tujia, Hui, etc.) [TMRCA 12,800 ybp (95% CI 8,400 ↔ 18,800) ybp]
      - A5b1 — China (Han from Beijing, etc.), Japan, Korea, Uyghur, Thailand, Vietnam (Tay), Singapore [TMRCA 8,600 (95% CI 6,600 ↔ 11,100) ybp]
        - A5b1* — Uyghur
        - A5b1a — Japan (Tokyo, etc.), Korea [TMRCA 6,700 (95% CI 3,700 ↔ 11,300) ybp]
        - A5b1b — China (Han from Fujian, Miao, etc.), Uyghur, Korea [TMRCA 7,300 (95% CI 5,600 ↔ 9,400) ybp]
          - A5b1b* — Han Chinese
          - A5b1b1
            - A5b1b1* — Miao
            - A5b1b1a — China
            - A5b1b1b — China
          - A5b1b2 — Uyghur
        - A5b1c — Han Chinese (Denver) [TMRCA 7,600 (95% CI 3,100 ↔ 15,500) ybp]
          - A5b1c1 — Taiwan (Hakka, Bunun, Paiwan) [TMRCA 5,400 (95% CI 1,800 ↔ 12,600) ybp]
        - A5b1d [TMRCA 7,300 (95% CI 3,700 ↔ 13,000) ybp]
          - A5b1d* — China
          - A5b1d1 — Siamese (Central Thailand), Tay (Vietnam)
      - A5b2 — China (Tujia, etc.)
    - A5c — Japan (Aichi, etc.), Korea, Khamnigan, Buryat, Barghut [TMRCA 8,200 (95% CI 4,800 ↔ 13,000) ybp]
      - A5c1 — Japan (Tokyo, Chiba, Aichi, etc.)
  - A8 — Uyghur [TMRCA 14,000 (95% CI 9,500 ↔ 19,800) ybp]
    - A8a — Okunev culture, Ket, Selkup, Pakistan, Poland, Italy [TMRCA 11,000 (95% CI 8,000 ↔ 14,800) ybp]
      - A8a* — Han Chinese (Guizhou), Korean
      - A8a1 — Hungary, Albania [TMRCA 5,500 (95% CI 3,000 ↔ 9,200) ybp]
        - A8a1* — Uyghur, Poland (Podhale), USA (Louisiana)
        - A8a1a — Yakut, Uyghur, Buryat
      - A8a2
        - A8a2a — Kets (Kellog, etc.), Tofalar (Alygdzher) [TMRCA 2,200 (95% CI 125 ↔ 12,000) ybp]
        - A8a2b — Tuvan (Bay-Tal), Poland
    - A8b — Koryak [TMRCA 1,050 (95% CI 75 ↔ 5,600) ybp]
  - A10 — China (Uyghur), Afghanistan (Hazara, Uzbek), Russia (Mansi, Volga Tatars, etc.), France, Canada, New York [TMRCA 9,200 (95% CI 4,900 ↔ 15,600) ybp]

=== Table of Frequencies of MtDNA Haplogroup A ===
Population	Frequency	Count	Source	Subtypes
Tłı̨chǫ (Dogrib)	1	42		
Tlingit	1	2		
Acoma Pueblo	1	1		
Esselen	1	1		A01
Haida	0.966	29		
Eskimo (Greenland)	0.961	385	Volodko 2008	A2b=196, A2a=174
Eskimo (Chaplin)	0.900	50	Volodko 2008	A2a=36, A2b=9
Eskimo (Canada)	0.875	96	Volodko 2008	A2b=68, A2a=16
Mixtec	0.828	29		
Siberian Eskimo	0.772	79		A2=61 (41/46 Chaplin, 17/25 Sireniki, 3/8 Naukan)
Eskimo (Naukan)	0.744	39	Volodko 2008	A2b=16, A2a=13
Chukchi (Anadyr, Chukotka)	0.733	15		A2=11
Eskimo (Sireniki)	0.703	37	Volodko 2008	A2a=16, A2b=10
Chukchi	0.682	66		A2=45
Chickasaw/Choctaw	0.667	27		
Mixe	0.625	16		
Apache	0.621	29		
Nahua (Cuetzalan, Mexico)	0.613	31		A=19
Nahua/Cora (Mexico)	0.531	32		
Siouan-Catawban	0.529	34		
Chumash	0.524	21		A02, A03, A04, A05, A07, A09, A10, A12
Maya (Mexico)	0.519	27		
Navajo	0.517	58		
Nuxalk (Bella Coola)	0.5	36		
Salinan	0.5	6		A01, A06, A13
Ojibwe (Chippewa)/Kickapoo	0.484	62		
Salinan/Chumash	0.455	11		
Nuu-Chah-Nulth	0.4	15		
Kiowa	0.4	5		
Creek/Seminole	0.389	18		
Aleut (Aleutian Islands)	0.344	163	Volodko 2008	A2a=56
Zapotec	0.333	15		
Pawnee	0.333	3		
Cheyenne/Arapaho	0.308	26		
Nu (Gongshan, Yunnan)	0.300	30		A=9
Lisu (Gongshan, Yunnan)	0.297	37		A=11
Mi'kmaq (Newfoundland)/Narragansett	0.286	7		
Chuvantsi (Markovo, Chukotka)	0.250	32	Volodko 2008	A2a=6, A2b=2
Tibetan (Diqing, Yunnan)	0.250	24		A=6
Yi (Hezhang County, Guizhou)	0.250	20		A=5
Ohlone (Costanoan)	0.25	8	(Note: Two skeletons, one each from CA-MNT-1489 and CA-MNT-1931, Late Period archeological sites located in Rancho San Carlos, inland from Carmel and south of the Carmel River, were both determined to be of haplotype A01 (Breschini & Haversat 2004). An adult and child, dating from Cal BP 200, buried at CA-MNT-831, a site in Pacific Grove, on the Monterey Peninsula, both belonged to haplogroup D01 (Breschini & Haversat 2004). Of four Ohlone mtDNA lineages identified by Johnson & Lorenz 2006, two belonged to haplogroup C, one each to haplogroups B and D, and none to haplogroup A. Of these eight Ohlone individuals, two belonged to haplogroup A.)	A01
Tibetan (Nagchu, Tibet)	0.229	35		A=8
Tibetan (Qinghai)	0.214	56		A=12
Tibetan (Shannan, Tibet)	0.211	19		A=4
Yi (Xishuangbanna, Yunnan)	0.188	16		A=3
Tibetan (Chamdo, Tibet)	0.172	29		A1=5
Zuni	0.182	22		
Korean (Arun Banner)	0.146	48		A5=4, A(xA5)=3
Tujia (Western Hunan)	0.141	64		A=9
Pumi (Ninglang, Yunnan)	0.139	36		A=5
Tujia (Yanhe County, Guizhou)	0.138	29		A=4
Tibetans	0.136	432		A6=9, A11a=15, A15c1a=14,
Tibetan (Lhasa, Tibet)	0.136	44		A1=6
Mongolian (Ulaanbaatar)	0.128	47		A4(xA2)=6
Hani (Xishuangbanna, Yunnan)	0.121	33		A=4
Japanese (Miyazaki)	0.120	100		A4=4, A5=4, A(xA4,A5)=4
Gelao (Daozhen County, Guizhou)	0.118	102		A=12
Penutian (California)	0.118	17		
Tibetan (Zhongdian, Yunnan)	0.114	35		A=4
Tubalar (Turochak & Choysky)	0.111	72		A(xA2)=8
Havasupai/Hualapai/Yavapai/Mojave	0.111	18		
Tibetan (Shannan, Tibet)	0.109	55		A1=6
Tibetan (Shigatse, Tibet)	0.103	29		A1=3
Mongolian (Sükhbaatar Province)	0.102	246		A=14, A5c=1, A8a=1, A12=8, A14=1
Yi (Shuangbai, Yunnan)	0.100	40		A=4
Manchurian	0.100	40		A(xA4,A5)=3, A4=1
Han Chinese (Shaanxi)	0.099	562		A=9, A1=5, A5a=1, A5b=3, A5c=1, A6=3, A8a=2, A11=2, A12=1, A14=7, A15a=9, A15b=1, A15c=2, A17=4, A18=2, A19=1, A20=1, A21=1, A22=1
Korean (northern China)	0.098	51		A4=4, A5(xA5a)=1
Yi (Luxi, Yunnan)	0.097	31		A=3
Han (Denver)	0.096	73	Zheng 2011	A=7
Han Chinese (Jilin)	0.094	381		A=11, A1=1, A3=1, A5a1a2=1, A5b=2, A8a=1, A11=3, A12=1, A14=1, A15=7, A17=4, A18=2, A19=1
Japanese	0.090	211		A5=11, A(xA5)=8
Naxi (Lijiang, Yunnan)	0.089	45		A=4
Korean (South Korea)	0.089	203		A=18
Chinese (Shenyang, Liaoning)	0.088	160		A=14
Hmong (Jishou, Hunan)	0.087	103		A(xA6)=7, A6=2
Han Chinese (Liaoning)	0.087	646		A=56
Japanese (Tōhoku)	0.086	336		A=29
Mongolian (Dornod Province)	0.084	370		A=17, A1a=6, A5a=4, A13=1, A14=1, A16=1, A25=1
Evenk (Siberia)	0.084	130		A2a=2, A4=7, A4b=2
Mongol (New Barag Left Banner)	0.083	48		A(xA5)=4
Tibetans	0.083	145		A11=4, A14=3, A15=2, A21=3
Korean (South Korea)	0.081	185		A4=6, A5(xA5a)=5, A(xA4,A5)=3, A5a=1
Cochimí	0.077	13		
Korean (South Korea)	0.077	261		A=20
Mongolian (Khentii Province)	0.076	132		A=8, A12=2
Han (Beijing Normal University)	0.074	121	Zheng 2011	A=9
Pai Yuman	0.074	27		A=2
Tibetan (Nyingchi, Tibet)	0.074	54		A1=4
Han (Southwest China, pool of 44 Sichuan, 34 Chongqing, 33 Yunnan, and 26 Guizhou)	0.073	137		A=10
Han (Hunan and Fujian)	0.073	55	Zheng 2011	A=4
Telengit	0.073	55		A=4
Korean (Seoul National University Hospital)	0.073	633	Fuku 2007	A=46
Japanese people	0.071	672		A1a=1, A3a=1, A5a1=28, A5a2=3, A5a3=2, A5a4=1, A5a-a*=5, A5b1a1a=1, A5c(xA5c1)=4, A7a=1, A25b=1
Buryat	0.071	126		A(xA5)=9
Han (southern California)	0.069	390		A=27
Korean (South Korea)	0.068	103		A5=4, A4(xA2)=3
Japanese (Tokyo)	0.068	118	Zheng 2011	A=8
Okinawa	0.067	326		A=22
Japanese (northern Kyūshū)	0.066	256		A=17
Mongolian (Mongolia)	0.064	2420		A=75, A1a=15, A5a=4, A5c=1, A7=2, A8a1=14, A11(xA11a1)=6, A12a=14, A13=3, A14=4, A15(xA15a)=7, A16=2, A23=4, A24=2, A25=2,
Itelmen	0.064	47		A(xA2)=3
Japanese (Gifu)	0.063	1617	Fuku 2007	A=102
Yokuts	0.063	16		A08
Zhuang (Napo County, Guangxi)	0.062	130		A=8
Barghut (Hulun Buir)	0.060	149		A4=8, A8=1
Japanese (Hokkaidō)	0.060	217	Asari 2007	A=13
Bai (Dali, Yunnan)	0.059	68		A=4
Ket	0.059	34		A8a2
Evenk (Siberia)	0.056	71		A(xA2)=4
Telenghit (Altai Republic)	0.056	71		A4(xA2)=4
Jino (Xishuangbanna, Yunnan)	0.056	18		A=1
Bai (Xishuangbanna, Yunnan)	0.053	19		A=1
Koryak	0.052	155		A2=4, A(xA2)=4
Mongolian (Khovd Province)	0.051	429		A(xA1a, A14, A15, A23, A24)=12, A11a1=3, A8a1=7
Buryat (Buryatia)	0.051	295		A4(xA2)=13, A5=1, A8=1
Khamnigan (Buryatia)	0.051	99		A4(xA2)=4, A5=1
Tibetan (Deqin, Yunnan)	0.050	40		A=2
Han (Beijing)	0.050	40		A4=1, A(xA4,A5)=1
Japanese (Tōkai)	0.050	282		A=14
Dai (Xishuangbanna, Yunnan)	0.049	41		A=2
Vietnamese	0.048	42		A4=1, A5(xA5a)=1
Yakama	0.048	42		A=2
Daur people (Hulunbuir)	0.048	209		A=2, A1a=2, A5c=1, A8a=1, A14=4
Han (Kunming, Yunnan)	0.047	43		A=2
Jetisu Kazakhstan	0.045	200		A=4, A12=2, A14=1, A5=2
Dolgan (Anabarsky, Volochanka, Ust-Avam, & Dudinka)	0.045	154		A10=3, A8=2, A4(xA4b)=2
Oroqen (Oroqen Autonomous Banner)	0.045	44		A(xA5)=2
Va (Simao, Yunnan)	0.045	22		A=1
Evenk (New Barag Left Banner)	0.043	47		A(xA5)=2
Mongolian (Ulaanbaatar)	0.043	47		A4=2
Tatar (Aznakayevo)	0.042	71	Malyarchuk 2010	A(xA8b)=2, A8b=1
Altai-kizhi	0.042	48		A=2
Guoshan Yao (Jianghua, Hunan)	0.042	24		A(xA6)=1
Evenk (Krasnoyarsk)	0.041	73		A4(xA2)=3
Evenk (Ust-Maysky, Oleneksky, Zhigansky)	0.040	125		A4(xA4b)=3, A4b=2
Ainu	0.039	51	Sato 2009	A=2
Kalmyk (Kalmykia)	0.036	110		A4(xA2)=3, A8=1
Han (Taiwanese)	0.036	111		A4e1=2, A5b=2
Yakut (Vilyuy River basin)	0.036	111		A4(xA4b)=2, A4b=1, A8=1
Han (Taiwan)	0.036	1117		A=40
Dong (Tianzhu County, Guizhou)	0.036	28		A=1
Shor	0.036	28		A=1
Khakassian (Khakassia)	0.035	57		A4(xA2)=2
Altay Kizhi	0.033	90		A4(xA2)=3
Taiwanese (Taipei, Taiwan)	0.033	91		A=3
Wuzhou Yao (Fuchuan, Guangxi)	0.032	31		A(xA6)=1
Tatar (Buinsk)	0.032	126	Malyarchuk 2010	A8b=4
Pan Yao (Tianlin, Guangxi)	0.031	32		A6=1
Kazakh (Kosh-Agach District)	0.031	98		A4=3
Mansi	0.031	98		A(xA2)=3
Altai-kizhi (Altai Republic)	0.029	276		A=8
Bapai Yao (Liannan, Guangdong)	0.029	35		A6=1
Guangdong	0.026	546		A=14
Kim Mun (Malipo, Yunnan)	0.025	40		A6=1
Persian (eastern Iran)	0.024	82		A4(xA2)=2
Tu Yao (Hezhou, Guangxi)	0.024	41		A6=1
Yakut (vicinity of Yakutsk)	0.024	164		A4b=2, A4(xA4b)=1, A8=1
Lowland Yao (Fuchuan, Guangxi)	0.024	42		A(xA6)=1
Tajik (Tajikistan)	0.023	44		A4(xA2)=1
Daur (Evenk Autonomous Banner)	0.022	45		A(xA5)=1
Evenk (Buryatia)	0.022	45		A4(xA2)=1
Tuvan	0.021	95		A(xA2)=2
Aini (Xishuangbanna, Yunnan)	0.020	50		A=1
Kumandin (Turochak District)	0.019	52		A=1
Guangxi	0.017	1111		A=19
Yakut	0.017	117		A(xA5)=2
Vietnamese people (Kinh)	0.013	399		A=1, A11=1, A15(xA15b)=2, A5b1b=1
Shor (Kemerovo)	0.012	82		A4(xA2)=1
Tuvinian (Tuva)	0.010	105		A4(xA2)=1
Khanty	0.009	106		A=1
Vietnam	0.008	392		A=3
Southeast Yunnan	0.006	158		A=1
Li (Hainan)	0.003	346		A=1
Kiliwa	0.000	7		–
Seri	0.000	8		–
Paiute/Shoshone	0	9		–
Dingban Yao (Mengla, Yunnan)	0.000	10		–
Xiban Yao (Fangcheng, Guangxi)	0.000	11		–
Kiliwa/Paipai	0	11		–
Uto-Aztecan (California)	0	14		
Lahu (Xishuangbanna, Yunnan)	0.000	15		–
Kumeyaay	0	16		–
Yukaghir (Upper Kolyma)	0.000	18	Volodko 2008	–
Huatou Yao (Fangcheng, Guangxi)	0.000	19		–
Filipino (Palawan)	0.000	20		–
Dai (Xishuangbanna, Yunnan)	0.000	21		–
Yukaghir (Verkhnekolymsky & Nizhnekolymsky)	0.000	22		–
River Yuman	0.000	22		–
Delta Yuman	0.000	23		–
Quechan/Cocopah	0	23		–
Hindu (Chitwan, Nepal)	0.000	24		–
Nganasan	0.000	24		–
Tibetan (Nyingchi, Tibet)	0.000	24		–
Buryat (Kushun, Nizhneudinsk, Irkutsk)	0.000	25		–
Bunu (Dahua & Tianlin, Guangxi)	0.000	25		–
Kurd (northwestern Iran)	0.000	25		–
Lanten Yao (Tianlin, Guangxi)	0.000	26		–
Iu Mien (Mengla, Yunnan)	0.000	27		–
Washo	0	28		–
Andhra Pradesh (tribal)	0.000	29		–
Batek (Malaysia)	0.000	29		–
Cun (Hainan)	0.000	30		–
Tujia (Yongshun, Hunan)	0.000	30		–
Batak (Palawan)	0.000	31		–
Gelao (Daozhen County, Guizhou)	0.000	31		–
Lingao (Hainan)	0.000	31		–
Lahu (Simao, Yunnan)	0.000	32		–
Mendriq (Malaysia)	0.000	32		–
Mien (Shangsi, Guangxi)	0.000	32		–
Negidal	0.000	33		–
Teleut	0.000	33		–
Temuan (Malaysia)	0.000	33		–
Lahu (Lancang, Yunnan)	0.000	35		–
Aleut (Commander Islands)	0.000	36	Volodko 2008	–
Va (Ximeng & Gengma, Yunnan)	0.000	36		–
Yakut (Yakutia)	0.000	36		–
Jemez/Taos/San Ildefonso Pueblo	0	36		–
Taono O'odham	0.000	37		–
Hmong (Wenshan, Yunnan)	0.000	39		–
Nganasan	0.000	39	Volodko 2008	–
Thai	0.000	40		–
Tharu (Morang, Nepal)	0.000	40		–
Ambon	0.000	43		–
Lombok (Mataram)	0.000	44		–
Alor	0.000	45		–
Tofalar	0.000	46		–
Udegey	0.000	46		–
Hindu (New Delhi, India)	0.000	48		–
Sumba (Waingapu)	0.000	50		–
Jahai (Malaysia)	0.000	51		–
Senoi (Malaysia)	0.000	52		–
Teleut (Kemerovo)	0.000	53		–
Nivkh (northern Sakhalin)	0.000	56		–
Filipino	0.000	61		–
Semelai (Malaysia)	0.000	61		–
Mansi	0.000	63		–
Filipino	0.000	64		–
Filipino (Mindanao)	0.000	70		–
Tubalar (Turochak District)	0.000	71		–
Bali	0.000	82		–
Yukaghir (Lower Kolyma-Indigirka)	0.000	82	Volodko 2008	–
Ulchi	0.000	87		–
Chelkan (Turochak District)	0.000	91		–
N. Paiute/Shoshoni	0.000	94		–
Northern Paiute	0.000	98		–
Even (Eveno-Bytantaysky & Momsky)	0.000	105		–
Even (Siberia)	0.000	122		
Tharu (Chitwan, Nepal)	0.000	133		–
Yakut (northern Yakutia)	0.000	148		–
Cham (Bình Thuận, Vietnam)	0.000	168		–
Filipino (Luzon)	0.000	177		–
Sumatra	0.000	180		–
Sulawesi	0.000	237		–
Taiwan aborigine	0.000	640		–

== Popular culture ==
The mummy "Juanita" of Peru, also called the "Ice Maiden", has been shown to belong to mitochondrial haplogroup A.

In his popular book The Seven Daughters of Eve, Bryan Sykes named the originator of this mtDNA haplogroup Aiyana.

Eva Longoria, an American actress of Mexican descent, belongs to Haplogroup A2. Michelle Rodriguez, an American actress with a Dominican mother, is likewise in A2.

== See also ==
- Genealogical DNA test
- Genetic genealogy
- Human mitochondrial genetics
- Population genetics
- Indigenous Amerindian genetics

Phylogenetic tree of human mitochondrial DNA (mtDNA) haplogroups

Mitochondrial Eve (L)

L0
L1–6

L1
L2

L3

L4
L5
L6
M
N

CZ
D
E
G
Q

O
A
S
R

I
W
X
Y
C
Z
B
F
R0

pre-JT

P

U
HV
JT
K
H
V
J
T
