= Norilsk oil spill =

2020 industrial disaster in Russia

Norilsk diesel oil spill
- Extent of the spill as seen by Sentinel-2 satellite
- Interactive map of Norilsk diesel oil spill
- Location: Norilsk, Krasnoyarsk Krai, Russia
- Coordinates: 69°22′46″N 87°44′40″E
- Date: 29 May 2020 - June 2020

Cause
- Cause: Collapse of foundations due to permafrost melting; Corrosion of tank bottom
- Operator: NTEK (Nornickel subsidiary)

Spill characteristics
- Volume: 21,000 m^{3} (17,500 tonnes)
- Area: 350 km^{2} (140 sq mi)

The Norilsk diesel oil spill was an industrial disaster near Norilsk, Krasnoyarsk Krai, Russia. It began on 29 May 2020 when a fuel storage tank at Norilsk-Taimyr Energy's Thermal Power Plant No. 3 (owned by Nornickel) failed, flooding local rivers with up to 17,500 tonnes of diesel oil. President Vladimir Putin declared a state of emergency in early June. The incident has been described as the second-largest oil spill in modern Russian history, after the 1994 Komi pipeline spill, where 400,000 tonnes of crude oil were released to the environment between August 1994 and January 1995.

== Cause ==
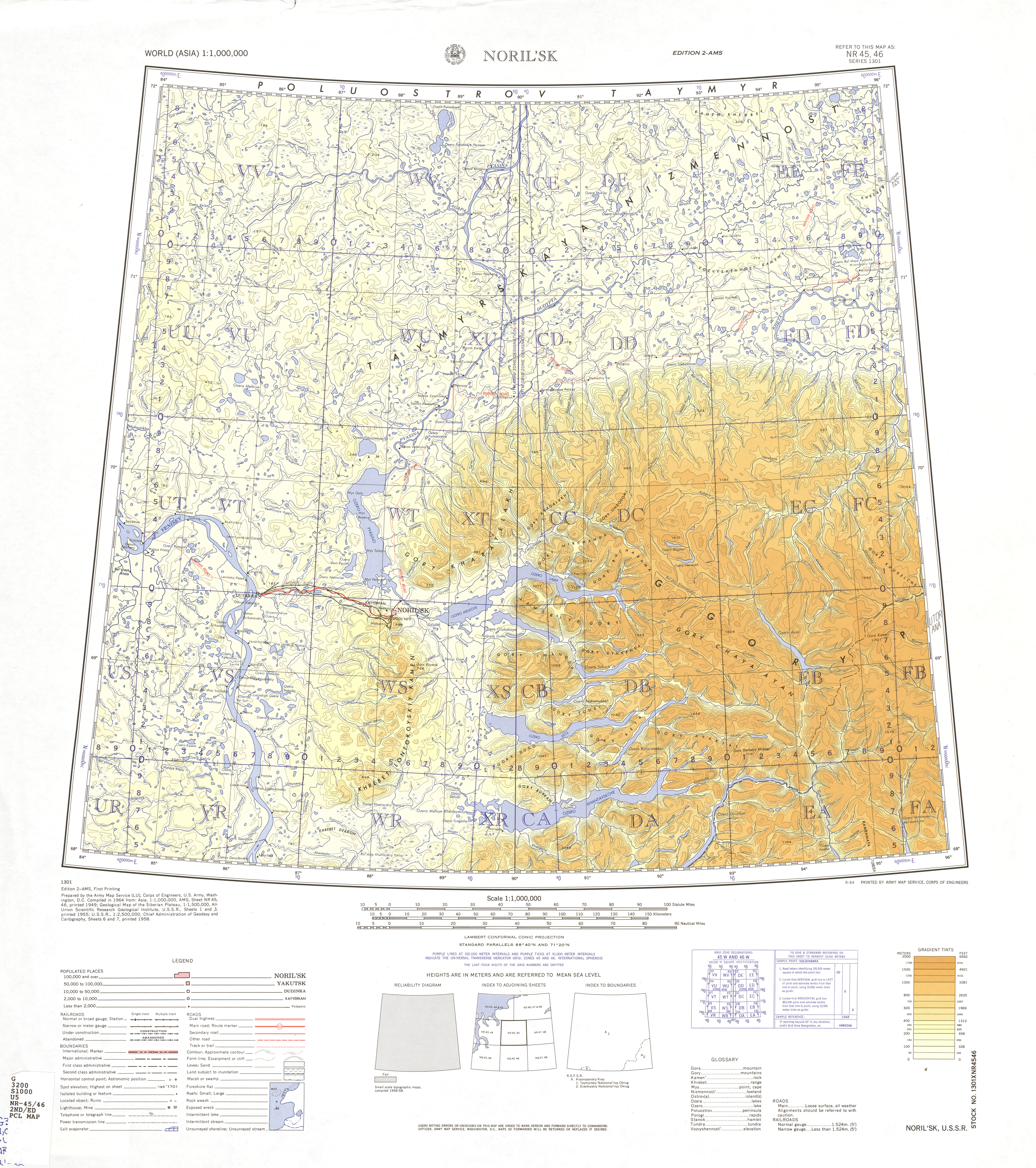
Map of Norilsk (labeled as NORIL'SK) and surrounding region (AMS, 1964)

Diesel oil is used as a backup fuel for the Norilsk-Taimyr Energy coal-fired combined heat and power plant. Fuel storage Tank 5 failed due to holes at the tank bottom, caused by the formation of ulcerative corrosion. In 2014, the company had been ordered by the Russian regulatory agency for natural resources Rostekhnadzor to, by 2015, clean the outer surface of the walls and roof of the tanks from rust and restore the anticorrosion coating, and by October 2016, to conduct non-destructive inspection of the tank bottoms. Despite these requests from the Russian Government, Norilsk-Taimyr Energy did not take the requested steps to avoid a failure of Tank 5.

== Spread and clean-up ==
Up to 21,000 cubic metres (17,500 tonnes) of diesel oil spilled on to the ground and into local rivers, affecting an immediate area of 18 hectares (44 acres), the nearby Daldykan River, a tributary of the Ambarnaya River, and contaminating an area of 350 square kilometres (140 square miles). Clean-up efforts were anticipated to be difficult as there are no roads and the rivers are too shallow for boats and barges. It was estimated the immediate cost of emergency relief activities would be 10 billion rubles (US$146 million), with a total clean-up cost of 100 billion rubles (US$1.5 billion), which would take five to ten years; Norilsk Nickel is to pay the costs.

On 4 June 2020 Russian state television reported that the spill had been contained using a series of specially constructed booms on the Ambarnaya river. However, drifting ice broke the booms and the spill reached Lake Pyasino, threatening the Pyasina River, which flows into the Arctic Ocean.

== Aftermath ==
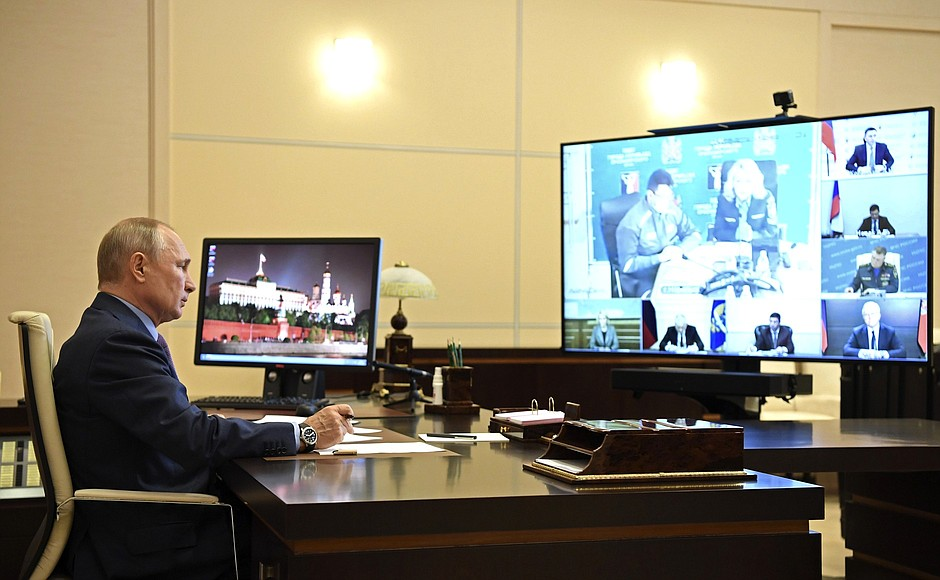
President Putin chairing a meeting about the fuel spill on 3 June 2020

Russia's Investigative Committee launched a criminal investigation of the spill.

The head of the power plant's boiler-turbine workshop was placed in pretrial detention, charged with violating environmental regulations and negligence. Yevgeny Zinichev, head of Russia's Emergency Situations Ministry, stated that the power plant did not report the incident for two days, while trying to contain the situation on their own. President Vladimir Putin declared a regional state of emergency following the spill, and criticized the local authorities for a slow response. He also criticized Vladimir Potanin, chairman and major shareholder of Norilsk Nickel, for not properly maintaining the safety of the fuel tanks at the plant. Putin ordered officials to amend Russian law to prevent similar accidents in the future. In a 3 June 2020 televised meeting devoted to disaster management, Putin asked Sergei Lipin, the head of NTEK: "Why did government agencies only find out about this two days after the fact? Are we going to learn about emergency situations from social media?"

After the state environmental agency Rosprirodnadzor told its employee Vasily Ryabinin to stop investigating the disaster, he quit his job on 7 June and went public as a whistleblower.

In the aftermath of the Norilsk spill, Russia's Prosecutor General's office ordered safety checks at all dangerous installations built on the permafrost in Russia's Arctic. Greenpeace Russia compared the potential environmental effects of the Norilsk spill to that of the 1989 Exxon Valdez oil spill.

As a result of this incident, Oleg Deripaska, the founder of Rusal, which in 2019 owned 28% of Nornickel, urged management changes at Nornickel, which is 35% owned by Potanin's Olderfrey Holdings Ltd.

In June 2020, Rosprirodnadzor asked Norilsk to pay 148 billion rubles to cover damage caused by the massive spill, but Norilsk disagreed with the value. In February 2021, a court ordered Norilsk to pay US$2 billion (146 billion rubles) for the spill.

== See also ==
- List of oil spills
