= Taimyr Pidgin Russian =

Russian-based pidgin language

- Govorka
- Native to: Russia
- Region: Taimyr Peninsula
- Ethnicity: Nganasan, Dolgans
- Native speakers: None; L2: few
- Language family: Russian-based creole: Taimyr Pidgin Russian

Language codes
- ISO 639-3: None (mis)
- Glottolog: taim1252
- IETF: crp-u-sd-rukya

Taimyr Pidgin Russian, also known as Govorka (Russian: говорка), is a Russian-based pidgin spoken on the Taimyr Peninsula by the Nganasan people. Before the expansion of universal education in the 20th century, most Nganasan spoke only their own language and pidgin Russian.

== Distribution ==
TPR is spoken by indigenous Nganasan and Dolgans in the Taimyr peninsula. The language is used to facilitate communication between two groups, especially in village with mixed populations like Ust-Avam and Volochanka.

== Lexicon ==
The lexicon of TPR is mostly Russian in origin with occasion loanwords from Nganasan and Dolgan.

== Sample Text ==
| TPR | English |
|---|---|
| Tut mésta usól-da ósira balsój najdj óm | Having left that place, we will find a huge lake |
