= Nganasan language =

Endangered Samoyedic language

Nganasan
- няˮ сиәде njaʔ siəde
- Pronunciation: [nʲaʔ siəðʲe]
- Native to: Russia
- Region: Taymyr Autonomous Okrug
- Ethnicity: 687 Nganasans (2021 census)
- Native speakers: c. 30 (2019–2024); 420 (2020 census)
- Language family: Uralic: Samoyedic; Nganasan
- Dialects: Avam; Vadeyev
- Writing system: Cyrillic script

Language codes
- ISO 639-3: nio
- Glottolog: ngan1291
- ELP: Nganasan
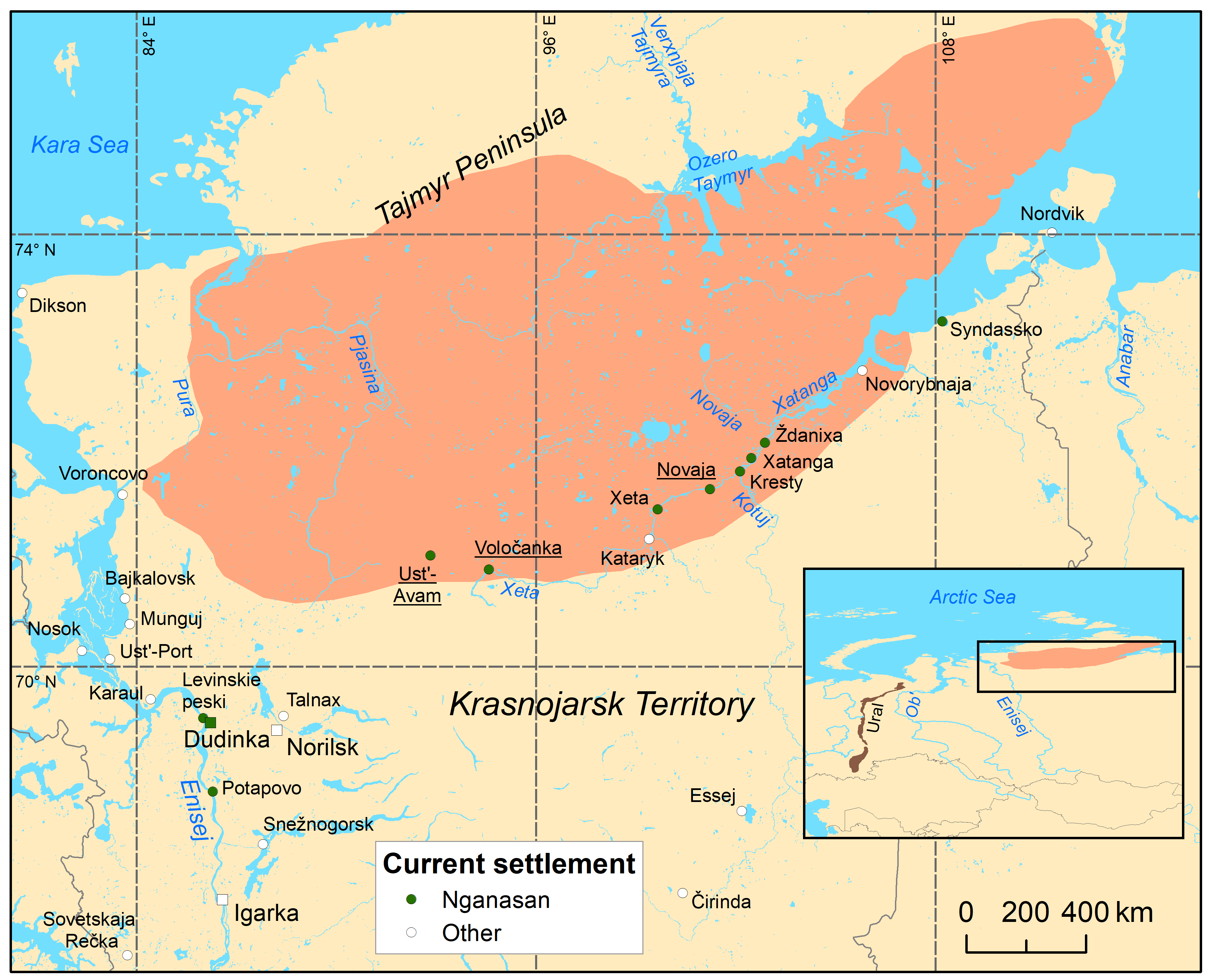
- Geographic distribution of Nganasan at the beginning of the 20th century and currently

- Nganasan is classified as Critically Endangered by the UNESCO Atlas of the World's Languages in Danger (2010).

The Nganasan language (formerly called тавгийский, tavgiysky, or тавгийско-самоедский, tavgiysko-samoyedsky in Russian; from the ethnonym тавги, tavgi) is a moribund Samoyedic language spoken by about 30 of the Nganasan people, who are native to the Taymyr Peninsula in northern Siberia, residing primarily in the settlements of Ust-Avam, Volochanka, and Novaya in the Taymyrsky Dolgano-Nenetsky District of Krasnoyarsk Krai, with smaller populations residing in the towns of Dudinka and Norilsk as well. It is notable for its unusual characteristics among the Samoyedic languages, as well among the greater Uralic languages.

== Classification ==
Nganasan is the most divergent language of the Samoyedic branch of the Uralic language family (Janhunen 1998). There are two main dialects, Avam (авамский говор, avamsky govor) and Vadeyev (Russian: вадеевский говор, romanized: vadeyevsky govor). A large part of the vocabulary can be traced to elements of unknown substrate origin, which are roughly twice as common in Nganasan than in other Samoyedic languages such as Nenets or Enets, and bear no apparent resemblance to the neighboring Tungusic and Yukaghir languages. The source of this substrate remains a mystery so far. It is possible that this substrate represents the last remaining evidence of a now-extinct Paleo-Siberian language once spoken in the Taymyr Peninsula, which was later supplanted by Nganasan. The root of the word Nganasan itself is of non-Uralic origin.

== Phonology ==
Nganasan has 10 vowel phonemes and 21 consonant phonemes.

=== Vowels ===
	Front		Central	Back
	unr.	rnd.	Central	Back
Close	i	y	ɨ	u
Mid	e		ə	o
Open	ⁱa		a	ᵘa

Several disyllabic sequences of vowels are possible:

		Second Vowel		
		High	Mid	Low
High First Vowel	i-	ii	iə	ia
High First Vowel	y-	yy	yə	ya
High First Vowel	ɨ-	ɨɨ	ɨə	ɨa
High First Vowel	u-	uu	uə	ua

Non-High First Vowel
	-i	-y	-u	-ə	-a
e-	ei	ey			
ə-	əi	əy	əu	əə	
o-	oi		ou		oa
a-	ai	ay	au		aa

The sequences /ⁱai/ and /iu/ also occur, but only across morpheme boundaries.

The vowels /e/ and /o/ only occur in initial syllables.

Vowels can be divided two pairs of groups based on harmony: front /ⁱa e i y/ vs back /a o ɨ u/, and unrounded /ⁱa e i ɨ/ vs rounded /a o y u/. Backness harmony only applies to high vowels.

Front vowels do not occur after initial dental consonants.

/ə ɨ u/ do not occur after palatal consonants, as they have fronted to /e i y/, although the first of these only happens in word-initial syllables.

/ⁱa/ does not occur after palatal consonants, having been neutralized into /a/.

/o/ does not occur after labial consonants, having unrounded to /ə/ in this position.

=== Consonants ===
The table below illustrates Nganasan's consonant phonemes:

		Bilabial	Dental	Alveolar		Palatal	Velar	Glottal
		Bilabial	Dental	plain	palatal	Palatal	Velar	Glottal
Nasal		m		n		ɲ	ŋ	
Plosive	voiceless	(p)		t		c	k	ʔ
Plosive	voiced	b		(d)		ɟ	ɡ	
Fricative			ð	s	sʲ			h
Approximant				l	lʲ	j		
Trill				r				

- [p] is an allophone of /b/ before voiceless obstruents.
  - It also occurs in recent Russian loans.
- [d] is an allophone of /t/ in the sequence /nt/ in closed syllables, e.g. [man.daj.ku] 'round'.
  - It also occurs word-initially in Russian loans, e.g. [dərəbə] 'hallo'.
- /ɟ/ has the allophone [j] when not before a vowel.
- /h/ is labialized [hʷ] before /a, ə/.

One of the main features of Nganasan is consonant gradation, which concerns the consonant phonemes /h, t, k, s/ alternating with /b, d, g, ɟ/ and their nasal combinations /ŋh, nt, ŋk, ns/ with /mb, nd, ŋg, ɲɟ/.

== Orthography ==
The language's Cyrillic-based alphabet was devised in the 1990s:

А а	Б б	В в	Г г	Д д	Е е	Ё ё	Ж ж
З з	З̌ з̌ (З̆ з̆)	И и	Й й	ˮ	К к	Л л	М м
Н н	Ӈ ӈ	О о	Ө ө	П п	Р р	С с	Т т
У у	Ү ү	Ф ф	Х х	Ц ц	Ч ч	Ш ш	Щ щ
Ъ ъ	Ы ы	Ь ь	Э э	Ә ә	Ю ю	Я я

Cyrillic orthography
А	Б	В	Г	Д	Е	Ё	Ж	З	З̌	И	Й	ˮ	К	Л	М	Н	Ӈ	О	Ө	П	Р	С	Т	У	Ү	Ф	Х	Ц	Ч	Ш	Щ	Ъ	Ы	Ь	Э	Ә	Ю	Я
а	б	в	г	д	е	ё	ж	з	з̌	и	й	ˮ	к	л	м	н	ӈ	о	ө	п	р	с	т	у	ү	ф	х	ц	ч	ш	щ	ъ	ы	ь	э	ә	ю	я
IPA
a	b	v	g	d	je	jo	ʒ	z	ð	i	j	ʔ	k	l	m	n	ŋ	o	ᵘa	p	ɹ, ɾ	s	t	u	y	f	x	t͡s	t͡ʃ	ʃ	ʃtʃ	-	ɨ	ʲ	e	ə	ju	ja

== Morphology ==
=== Nouns ===
Nouns in Nganasan have the grammatical categories of number (singular, dual, plural), case (nominative, genitive, accusative, lative, locative, elative, prolative, comitative) and possessivity (non-possessive versus possessive forms). Nganasan lacks determiners; however, the possessive forms of second person singular and third person singular can be used to express definiteness.

Case suffixes in Nganasan
	Singular	Dual	Plural
Nominative	Ø	-KƏJ	-ʔ
Accusative	Ø ~ (-M)	-KI	-J
Genitive	Ø ~ (-Ŋ)	-KI	-ʔ
Dative	-NTƏ	-	-NTI-ʔ
Locative	-NTƏ-NU	-	-NTI-NU
Ablative	-KƏ-TƏ	-	-KI-TƏ, ~KI-TI-ʔ
Prolative	-MƏ-NU	-	-ʔ-MƏ-NU

=== Pronouns ===
Nganasan has personal, demonstrative, interrogative, negative, and determinative pronouns. Personal pronouns are not inflected: their grammatical case forms coincide, and their local case forms are expressed by the corresponding possessed forms of the postposition na-. Other pronouns are inflected like nouns (Helimski, 1998).

Personal pronouns and pronominal forms
	Nom, Gen, Acc	Lative	Locative	Elative	Prolative	Personal pronouns + clitics	Personal emphatic pronouns
Sg1	mənə	nanə	nanunə	nagətənə	namənunə	mɨlʲianə	ŋonənə
Sg2	tənə	nantə	nanuntə	nagətətə	namənuntə	tɨlʲiatə	ŋonəntə
Sg3	sɨtɨ	nantu	nanuntu	nagətətu	namənuntu	sɨlʲiatɨ	ŋonəntu
Du1	mi	nani	nanuni	nagətəni	namənuni	mɨlʲiani	ŋonəni
Du2	ti	nandi	nanunti	nagətəndi	namənundi	tɨlʲiati	ŋonənti
Du3	sɨti	nandi	nanunti	nagətəndi	namənundi	sɨlʲiati	ŋonənti
Pl1	mɨŋ	nanuʔ	nanunuʔ	nagətənuʔ	namənunuʔ	mɨlʲianɨʔ	ŋonənuʔ
Pl2	tɨŋ	nanduʔ	nanuntuʔ	nagətənduʔ	namənunduʔ	tɨlʲiatiʔ	ŋonəntuʔ
Pl3	sɨtɨŋ	nanduŋ	nanuntuŋ	nagətənduŋ	namənunduŋ	sɨlʲiatɨŋ	ŋonəntuŋ

=== Verbs ===
Verbs agree with their subjects in person and number, and have three conjugation types. Like other Samoyedic languages, Nganasan has the opposition of perfective and imperfective verbs.

==== Conjugation ====
The subjective conjugation is used when there is no object or the object is focused. The objective conjugation is used with transitive words. The reflexive conjugation is used for some intransitive verbs. Each conjugation type has its own personal endings. There are three subtypes of objective conjugation endings that correspond to object number.

	Subjective	Objective			Objectless
	Subjective	singular object	dual object	plural object	Objectless
1Sg	-m	-mə	-kəi-j-nə	-j-nə	-nə
2Sg	-ŋ	-rə	-kəi-j-tə	-j-tə	-ŋ
3Sg	ø	-tu	-kəi-j-tu	-j-tu	-ʔ or -tə
1Du	-mi	-mi	-kəi-j-ni	-j-ni	-ni
2Du	-ri	-ri	-kəi-j-ti	-j-ti	-nti
3Du	-kəj	-ði	-kəi-j-ti	-j-ti	-nti
1Pl	-muʔ	-muʔ	-kəi-j-nuʔ	-j-nuʔ	-nuʔ
2Pl	-ruʔ	-ruʔ	-kəi-j-tu	-j-tu	-ntuʔ
3Pl	-ʔ	-tuŋ	-kəi-j-tuŋ	-j-tuŋ	-ntəʔ

==== Mood ====
Nganasan has a broad mood paradigm with nine forms: indicative, imperative, interrogative, inferential, renarrative, irrealis, optative, admissive-cohortive, debitive, abessive and prohibitive. Mood forms are mostly built with the help of affixation but special particles are also sometimes used. All mood forms, except the imperative, have the same personal suffixes. Tenses are distinguished in the indicative, imperative and interrogative moods (Tereščenko, 1979).

==== Aspect and tense ====
Most corresponding imperfective and perfective stems have the same root, but in rare cases the roots can be different. The aspectual opposition between imperfective and perfective verbs remains semantic in most verbal forms. However, in the indicative mood it is used to express present continuous and present perfect meanings, respectively. In this case, the opposition is present formally: imperfective verbs take imperfective suffixes and the perfective ones have the perfective suffixes (Helimski, 1998). Imperfective verbs can also express future meanings. These forms are not considered tense in the strict sense. The proper tense forms of past and future include past, past perfect, future, future-in-the past (Katzschmann, 2008).

==== Non-finite verb forms ====
Participles
	Formation	Example
Present participle	S1'-NTUə(-NCx)(-Px)	koðutuə "which kills ~ which is killed"
Preterite participle	S1-SUə-Dʲəə(-NCx)(-Px)	kotudʲüədʲəə "which killed ~ which was killed"
Future participle	S1'-ʔSUTə(-NCx)(-Px)	koðuʔsutə "which will kill ~ which will be killed"
Future-in-the-past participle	S1'-ʔSUTə-Dʲəə(-NCx)(-Px	koðuʔsutədʲəə "which was to kill ~ which was to be killed"
Abessive participle	S1-MəTUMA̩ʔ(-NCx)(-Px)	kotumətumaʔa "which does not kill ~ which is not been killed"
Preterite abessive participle	S1-MəTUMA̩ʔA̩̥-Dʲəə(-NCx)(-Px)	kotumətumaʔdʲəə "which did not kill ~ which was not killed"
Passive participle	S1-Məə(-NCx)(-Px)	kotuməə "killed"
Preterite passive participle	S1-Məə-Dʲəə(-NCx)(-Px)	kotuməədʲəə "which was killed"

Verbal adverbs
	Formation	Example
Verbal adverb	S1-SA	kotudʲa 'having killed', nʲisɪ̈ kotudʲa "having not killed"
Verbal adverb of immediate precedence	S1-KAJ-SA	kotugasʲa "having just killed"
Conditional-temporal verbal adverb	S1-HÜʔ(-Px4)	kotubüʔ "(if ~ when) to kill', kotubɪ̈nə 'if ~ when I kill", etc.
Preterite temporal verbal adverb	S1-HÜʔ-ə(-Cx))-Px)	kotubüʔə "when killed', kotubüʔəmə "when I killed", etc.
Future conditional verbal adverb	S1-HÜʔ-NÜ-Px2	kotubününə "if I will kill"

Verbal nouns
	Formation	Example
Imperfective verbal noun	S1-MUN(-Cx)(-Px)	kotumu sG kotumunə hireə "worth killing" sLat niimsiəm kotomundə "I was afraid to kill" sEla + s1 kotumu(ng)ətənə "so that I do not kill", etc.
Perfective verbal noun	(S3/S1')-ʔMUə(-Cx)(-Px)	koðaʔmuə ~ koðuʔmuə sLoc + s1 koðaʔmuəntənunə "where I killed", etc.
Preterite verbal noun	S1'-NTU(-Cx)(-Px)	koðutu sLat koðutundə "when killed" koðutundənə "when I killed"
Supine	S1'-NAKə(-Px2)	kotunakə s3 kotunagətu "in order that he killed", etc.

== Syntax ==
=== Word order ===
The dominating word order in Nganasan is subject-object-verb (SOV), similar to other Samoyedic languages. However, Nganasan is considered to exhibit more freedom in word order than other languages of its group. According to Tereščenko (1979), other types of word orders are used for shifting the sentence focus, especially in emphatic speech. The focused constituent usually immediately precedes the verb. Wagner-Nagy (2010) suggests that Nganasan is similar to Hungarian in its behavior, in that its word order is determined by pragmatic factors rather than being fixed.

On the phrase level, the attributes within the noun phrase usually precede the noun and become focused when placed after it. Numerals and adjectives agree with the heads in case, and adjectives also agree with the head in number. The case agreement is only complete in grammatical cases; in locative cases the attribute gets genitive form. There are no prepositions in Nganasan, postpositions are composite parts of words and also require the attributes in genitive cases. Possession is expressed with genitive construction or by a possessive suffix attached to the possessed (Helimski, 1998; Katzschmann, 2008).

Nganasan is a pro-drop language; pronominal subjects are often omitted when the verb conjugation type is subjective (Tereščenko, 1979).

=== Negation ===
Standard negation is expressed by negative auxiliary (ńi-) followed by the main verb in connegative form marked with ʔ, e.g. ńi-ndɨ-m konɨʔ "I do not go". All inflectional markers are taken by the negation auxiliary (Gusev, 2015). Objects in the form of personal, negative or demonstrative pronouns can be inserted between the negative auxiliary and the main verb (Wagner-Nagy, 2011). There are a few negative verbs other than ni-, such as kasa — "nearly", ləði — "vainly", əku — "maybe", and ŋuəli — "of course", but their functionality is restricted, with only ni- having a full paradigm.

Existential sentences are negated with the negative existential predicate d'aŋku or its derivative stem d'anguj-. D'aŋku can only be used in present indicative as it behaves like a noun: it takes nominal predicative endings. D'anguj- (a composite of d'aŋku and ij- "be") is used for all other tense/mood combinations.

=== Subordination ===
Subordination is typically formed by constructions with non-finite verbal forms. Such constructions are usually placed before the constituents they modify. The relative construction is always placed immediately before the modified constituent, whereas other types of constructions allow other constituents to interfere. The word order in such construction is the same as in simple sentences (Tereščenko, 1973).

=== Coordination ===
Coordination is most often achieved by means of intonation. Sometimes pronominal and adverbial derivatives can be used as conjunctions. For example, adverb ŋonə 'also' can be used as conjunction. The category of conjunctions may be undergoing formation under the influence of Russian (Tereščenko, 1973).

== Education ==
Compulsory education did not exist for Nganasans until the 1930s. They were therefore mostly illiterate until then. Not many Nganasans spoke Russian; spoken Russian would generally not be in standard Russian. Rather, it would be a pidgin called Taimyr Pidgin Russian or Govorka.

The first school was founded in Dudinka in 1920. After its foundation, other villages started to have schools. Russian was taught as the primary language in these schools, not only because the administration desired to Russify the population, but also due to the fact that Nganasan was spoken rather than written until the 1980s.

In schools, there are some learning materials for some age groups. Volochanka pupils only learn their heritage language 2 times a week. The Ust'ye Avam pupils no longer have this class, as their school closed after it burned down in 2012.

== Media ==
In 2019 professor Beáta Wagner-Nagy, who did fieldwork at Taimyr, reported the following. Radio Taimyr (as of 2025 it also has the name "Radio Rossii Taimyr", a part of the VGTRK), with its station in Dudinka have their broadcasts in Nganasan language daily since 1990, but these programs are only of 10–15 minutes long. 24 percent of Nganasan do listen to the radio program; some more want to but do not have a radio set. There are no TV broadcasts in Nganasan. Since 1993, the Taimyr newspaper (renamed from Sovetsky Taimyr following the end of the CPSU and abolition of a system of government called a Soviet republic) has been irregularly publishing news and other stories in Nganasan.

== Literature ==
- Gusev, V. (2015) Negation in Nganasan. In Miestamo, M., Tamm, A., Wagner-Nagy, B. (ed.) Negation in Uralic Languages, 103–312. Amsterdam: John Benjamins Publishing Company. ISBN 9789027268648.
- Helimski, Еugene. (1994). Очерк морфонологии и словоизменительной морфологии нганасанского языка. Таймырский этнолингвистический сборник (1), 190–221.
- Helimski, Eugene. (1998) Nganasan. In Abondolo, Daniel (ed.), The Uralic Languages, 480–515. London: Routledge.
- Katzschmann, Michael; Labanauskas, Kazis I. (2008). Chrestomathia Nganasanica: Texte - Übersetzung - Glossar - Grammatik ; Bearbeitung der "Nganasanskaja folʹklornaja chrestomatija", zusammengestellt von Kazis I. Labanauskas unter Berücksichtigung des "Slovarʹ nganasansko-russkij i russko-nganasanskij". Norderstedt: Books on Demand GmbH. ISBN 978-3-8370-1121-0.
- Kortt, I. R.; Simčenko, Ju. B. (1985). Wörterverzeichnis der Nganasanischen Sprache. Berlin: Systemata Mundi. ISBN 3-925500-00-6.
- Tereščenko, N.M. (1986) Алфавит нганасанского языка, in Skorik P.A. (ed.), Палеоазиатские языки, Leningrad: Nauka.
- Tereščenko, N.M. (1979) Нганасанский язык, Leningrad: Nauka.
- Tereščenko, N.M. (1973) Синтакс самодийских языков, Leningrad: Nauka.
- Wagner-Nagy, B. (2002) Chrestomathia Nganasanica. (Studia Uralo-Altaica: Supplementum 10) Szeged. ISBN 963-482-588-5.
- Wagner-Nagy, B. (2010) Existential and possessive predicate phrases in Nganasan. In Gusev, V. and Widmer, A., Finnisch-Ugrische Mitteilungen, 32/33. Hamburg: Buske.
- Wagner-Nagy, B. (2011) On the typology of negation in Ob-Ugric and Samoyedic languages (MSFOu 262). Helsinki: SUS.
- Wagner-Nagy, B. (2018). A grammar of Nganasan (Vol. 6). Brill.
