= Daldykan =

Russian river

- Native name: Далдыкан (Russian)

Physical characteristics
- Mouth: Ambarnaya
  - coordinates: 69°24′0″N 87°47′23″E
- Length: 29 km (18 mi)
- Basin size: 98.4 km^{2} (38.0 sq mi)

Basin features
- Progression: Ambarnaya→ Lake Pyasino→ Pyasina→ Kara Sea

The Daldykan (Russian: Далдыкан or Долдыкан Doldykan) is a river close to Norilsk in Taymyrsky Dolgano-Nenetsky District, Krasnoyarsk Krai in Russia, a right tributary of the Ambarnaya. It is 29 kilometres (18 mi) long, and has a drainage basin of 98.4 square kilometres (38.0 sq mi).

The Daldykan has been regularly polluted by nickel industry, namely from Nornickel; as a result the river's water has turned red.

== May 2020 diesel spill ==
In May 2020, 17,500 tonnes of diesel fuel spilt into the river from a power plant. Russia's president, Vladimir Putin, declared a state of emergency.
