= Khutudabiga =

Location
- Country: Russia

Physical characteristics
- Mouth: Kara Sea
  - coordinates: 74.401°N 86.638°E
- Length: 207 km (129 mi)
- Basin size: 4,640 km^{2} (1,790 sq mi)

The Khutudabiga (Russian: Хутудабига) is a river in Krasnoyarsk Krai, Russia. Its source is in the Byrranga Mountains. It flows across desolate tundra regions into the Minina Skerries area of the Kara Sea, about 50 kilometres (31 mi) north of the mouth of the Pyasina. It is 207 kilometres (129 mi) long, and has a drainage basin of 4,640 square kilometres (1,790 sq mi).

The Khutudabiga freezes up in late September—early October and stays under the ice until June. Formerly this river was known as Tamara, but its name was changed after the 1917 Russian Revolution.
