= Byrranga Mountains =

Mountain range in the country of Russia

- Gory Byrranga
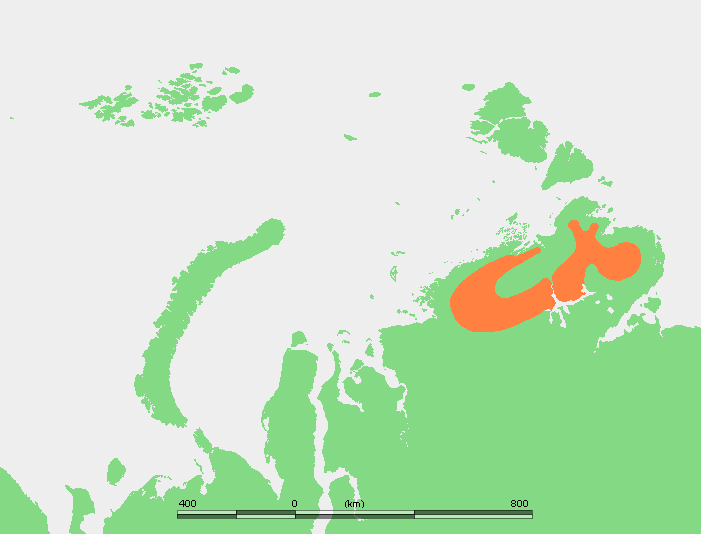
- Approximate extent of the Byrranga Mountains in the Taymyr Peninsula.

Highest point
- Peak: Lednikovaya Gora
- Elevation: 1,121 m (3,678 ft)
- Prominence: 1,120 m (3,670 ft)
- Listing: Ribu
- Coordinates: 76°0′N 108°0′E

Dimensions
- Length: 1,100 km (680 mi) ENE/WSW
- Width: 200 km (120 mi) NNW/SSE

Naming
- Native name: го́ры Бырра́нга (Russian)

Geography
- Location within Krasnoyarsk Krai
- Location: Taymyr Peninsula

Geology
- Orogeny: Alpine orogeny
- Rock age: Hercynian
- Rock type(s): Siltstones and intrusive rocks

The Byrranga Mountains (Russian: го́ры Бырра́нга; Gory Byrranga) are a mountain range in the middle of the Taymyr Peninsula, Siberia, Russia.

Even though they were first explored in 1736, the Byrranga Mountains are one of the least known areas of the Arctic. The climate is continental and harsh, with frequent blizzards in the winter.

This mountain range falls into the Krasnoyarsk Krai administrative division of the Russian Federation and is part of the Great Arctic State Nature Reserve, the largest nature reserve in Russia. However, the area is very remote, there is no population, and access is very difficult for the lack of roads and settlements.

== Geography ==
They are located north and west of Lake Taymyr and extend for about 1,100 kilometres (680 mi), forming a looping curve that runs roughly in a southwest to northeast direction. The name is from Nganasan бъранга [bəranga] 'large rocky mountain.'

The range has deep canyons and ravines, as well as a few small glaciers in its eastern zones. These mountains are not very high, being on average about 500 m (1,600 ft). The highest peak is 1,121 m (3,678 ft).

Rivers Khutudabiga and Chetyrekh have their sources in the Byrranga Range. The lower Taymyr River flows northwards cutting across these mountains. The lowlands located to the north and the south of these mountains are covered with tundra, small lakes and wetlands (bogs and marshes).

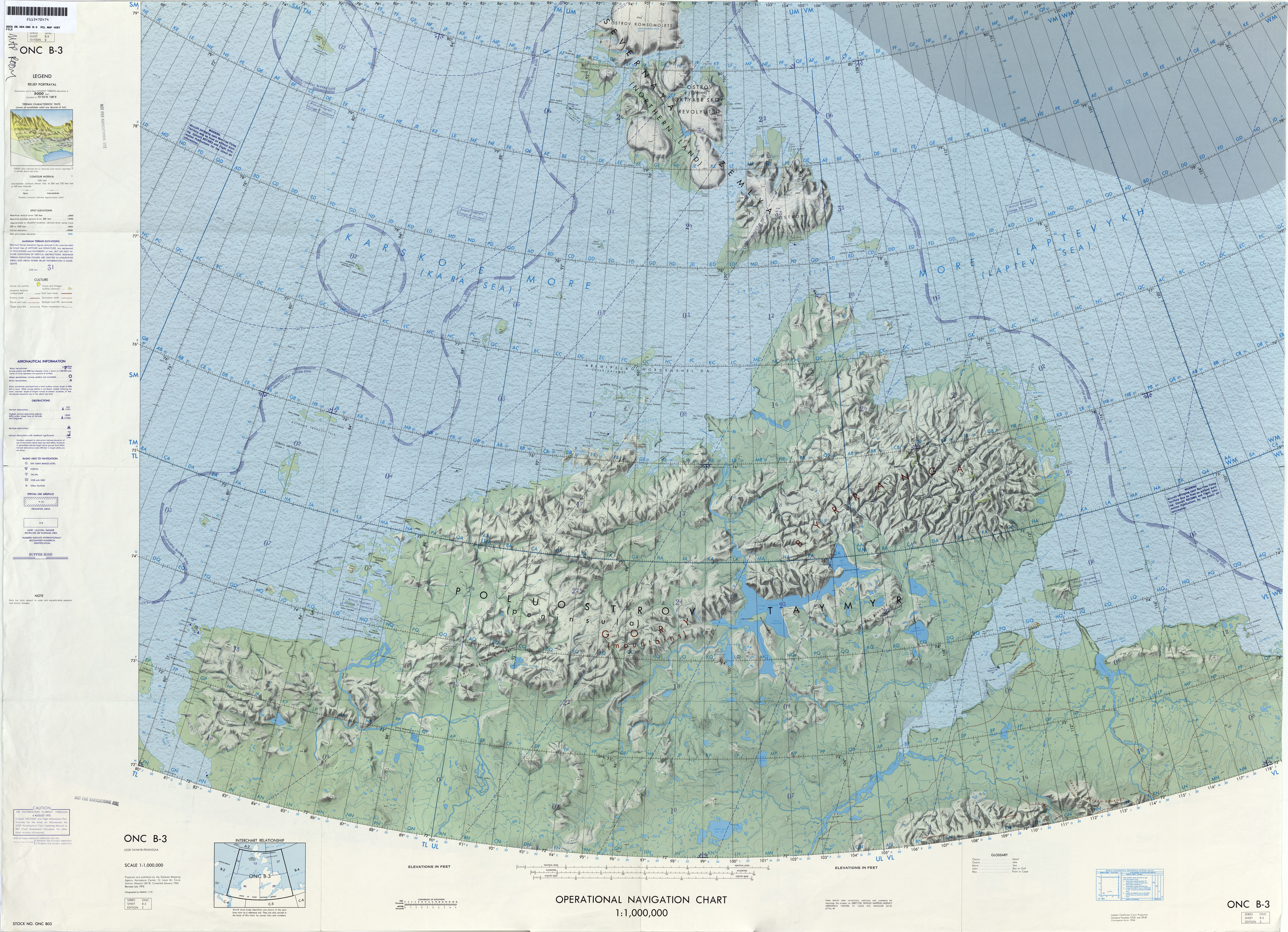
1975 map showing the Taymyr Peninsula and Severnaya Zemlya.

== Geology ==
The Byrranga Range is a Hercynian formation rejuvenated during the Alpine orogeny. It is mainly made up of siltstones and intrusive rocks of neutral composition. There are also vast areas of exposed limestone formation.

== See also ==
- Urstromtal
