= Chetyrekh =

Location
- Country: Russia

Physical characteristics
- Mouth: Kara Sea
  - coordinates: 74.0382°N 87.3379°E
- Length: 128 km (80 mi)
- Basin size: 1,010 km^{2} (390 sq mi)

The Chetyrekh is a river in Krasnoyarsk Krai, Russia. Its source is in the Byrranga Mountains. It flows across tundra regions into the Staritsa, a branch of the Pyasina that discharges into the Pyasina Bay of the Kara Sea north of the main mouth of the Pyasina. It is 128 kilometres (80 mi) long, and has a drainage basin of 1,010 square kilometres (390 sq mi).

The Chetyrekh freezes up in late September—early October and stays under the ice until June. Formerly this river was known as Dolgiy Brod River, but its name was changed after the 1917 Russian Revolution.
