= Ze with caron =

Cyrillic letter used in Shughni and Nganasan

- З̌ з̌

Usage
- Writing system: Cyrillic
- Type: Alphabetic
- Sound values: [d͡z], [ð]

Ze with caron (З̌, з̌; italics: З̌, з̌) is an additional letter of the Cyrillic script used in the Nganasan and Shughni languages, where it represents the sounds [ð] and [d͡z] (th as in this and ds as in kids), respectively. It is composed of the letter Ze ⟨З⟩ with a caron.

== Computing codes ==
Ze with caron can be represented by the following Unicode characters :

Character information
Preview	З		з		̌	
Unicode name	CYRILLIC CAPITAL LETTER ZE		CYRILLIC SMALL LETTER ZE		COMBINING CARON	
Encodings	decimal	hex	dec	hex	dec	hex
Unicode	1047	U+0417	1079	U+0437	780	U+030C
UTF-8	208 151	D0 97	208 183	D0 B7	204 140	CC 8C
Numeric character reference	&#1047;	&#x417;	&#1079;	&#x437;	&#780;	&#x30C;
Named character reference	&Zcy;		&zcy;			

== Bibliography ==
- Аламшо, М.; Карамшо, Д. (2000). Хуг̌ну̊ни зив̌. Хоруғ: Помир. p. 134.
