= Ambarnaya =

Russian river

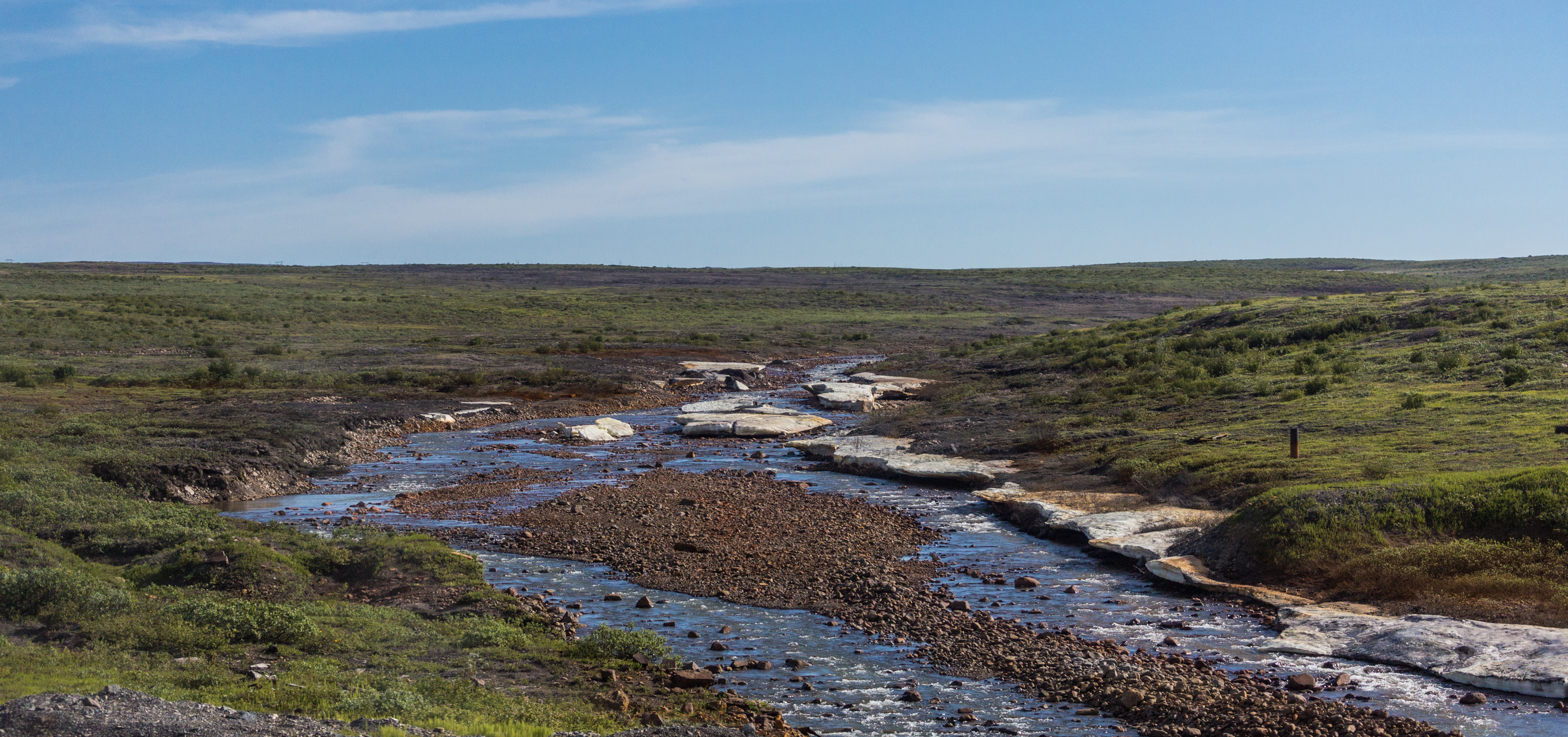
- Tundra on the Taymyr Peninsula between Dudinka and Norilsk, River Ambarnaya
- Native name: Амбарная (Russian)

Physical characteristics
- Source
  - coordinates: 69.283697°N 87.732524°E
- Mouth: Lake Pyasino
  - coordinates: 69.477599°N 87.920351°E
- Length: 60 km (37 mi)
- Basin size: 428 km^{2} (165 sq mi)

Basin features
- Progression: Lake Pyasino→ Pyasina→ Kara Sea
- Landmarks: Kayerkan
- Tributaries
  - right: Daldykan

The Ambarnaya (Russian: Амбарная, lit. 'barn girl') is a river in Siberia which flows in a northerly direction into Lake Pyasino. On leaving Lake Pyasino, the waters emerge as the river Pyasina. It shares a common delta with the river Norilskaya. It is 60 kilometres (37 mi) long, and has a drainage basin of 428 square kilometres (165 sq mi).

The river is fed by rain and meltwater. It is shallow and its bed consists of glacial moraine – gravel and pebbles. It is heavily polluted by the mining industry of Norilsk, namely Nornickel, so fishing is no longer possible.

== Diesel spill ==
In May 2020, 20,000 tonnes of diesel fuel spilt into the river from a power plant. With a 12 kilometres (7.5 mi) stretch of river seriously affected, Russia's president, Vladimir Putin, declared a state of emergency.
