= Dudypta =

Location
- Country: Russia

Physical characteristics
- Source: Lake Makar
- Mouth: Pyasina
  - coordinates: 70°51′40″N 89°54′10″E
- Length: 687 km (427 mi)
- Basin size: 33,100 km^{2} (12,800 sq mi)

Basin features
- Progression: Pyasina→ Kara Sea

The Dudypta (Russian: Дудыпта) is a river in Krasnoyarsk Krai in Russia, a right tributary of the Pyasina. The river is 687 kilometres (427 mi) long, and its drainage basin covers 33,100 square kilometres (12,800 mi^{2}). The Dudypta originates from Lake Makar (Dudypta Lakes) and flows over the central part of the North Siberian Lowland. The river is navigable for 150 kilometres (93 mi) upstream from its estuary.
