= Lake Pyasino =

Freshwater lake in Krasnoyarsk Krai, Russia

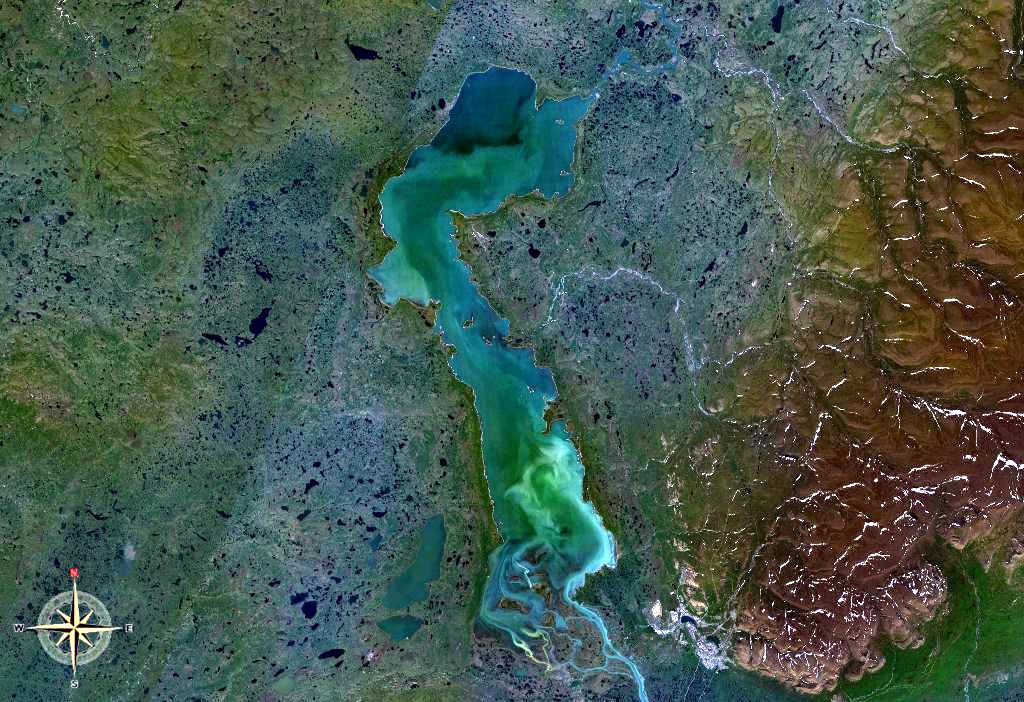
- Lake Pyasino seen from space

- Location within Russia Location within Krasnoyarsk Krai
- Location: Krasnoyarsk Krai
- Coordinates: 69.67°N 87.86°E
- Primary inflows: Norilskaya, Ambarnaya
- Primary outflows: Pyasina
- Basin countries: Russia
- Surface area: 735 km^{2} (284 sq mi)
- Frozen: October–June

Lake Pyasino (Russian: Пя́сино) is a large freshwater lake in Krasnoyarsk Krai, north-central part of Russia. It is located at 69.67°N 87.86°E and has an area of 735 km^{2}. Many rivers empty into the lake, including the Ambarnaya. Water from the lake emerges as the river Pyasina. Pyasino freezes up in October and stays icebound until June.

== Environmental pollution ==
As the recipient of polluted wastewater from Norilsk Nickel's metallurgical plants, it is almost completely devoid of fish. Environmental studies has been performed and comparative analysis of the data on heavy metal concentrations, namely Cu, Ni, Zn, Cd and Hg, in fish (burbot), moss, lichens, periphyton, hydric soils and snow in vicinity of Norilsk and further out in the most northern parts of the Taymyr Peninsula completed. Heavy metal concentrations in burbot liver were highest in Lake Pyasino compared to other study regions that were more than 100 km away.

== See also ==
- Norilsk oil spill
