= Ust-Avam =

Settlement in Siberia, Russia

Ust-Avam Усть-Авам
- Location within Krasnoyarsk Krai Location within Russia
- Coordinates: 71°06′51″N 92°49′22″E
- Country: Russia
- Krai: Krasnoyarsk Krai

Population
  - Total: 336

Ust-Avam, also known as Avam or Ust'ye Avam is a settlement in the Taymyr Peninsula in Krasnoyarsk Krai, Russia. It is located 330km from the town of Dudinka and, as of 2018, has a population of 339.

== History ==
The village was first founded in 1937. During World War II, the village's inhabitants participated in the war effort by providing the Red Army with money, food, warm clothing and fur.

In 1967, the Avamo-Nganasan Village Council was renamed the Ust-Avam Village Council, and the local collective farm merged with the Volochansky state farm. In 1971, a factory, which specialised in making products with raw materials obtained by wild reindeers hunting (meat, antlers and leather) was built, attracting workers from all over the Soviet Union.

With the collapse of the USSR, like many other small Siberian towns, the population greatly declined, although Norilsk Nickel had a five-year program attempting to attract potential newcomers to the area.

In 2020, an oil spill at a Nornickel power plant near Norilsk, poisoned tugunok fish - an important traditional food source - in the region. In September that year, Lake Pyasino was declared “dead” as a result of the spill. The Aborigen Forum (Ru Абориген-Форум), an indigenous peoples' advocacy group, led a social media campaign calling on Elon Musk, the CEO of Tesla, to boycott nickel sourced to Nornickel. Gennady Shchukin, the executive secretary of the Aborigen Forum as well as chairman of the Association of Indigenous Peoples in Taimyr, sent a statement to the company and local authorities recommending compensation and the promotion of professional education for Dolgan youths who had been prevented from learning their traditional lifestyle. He stated:

“We have no voice on any environmental programme in the region, and even the idea of our representatives being experts on the commission is nonexistent. However, we have no choice but to fight because we simply have nowhere to go. Most of Norilsk Nickel's workers have roots somewhere else in Russia, so they can say: ‘Let locals deal with it’ - and move elsewhere. But we live here, so we need to take action.”

In 2021, the Krasnoyarsk Arbitration Court ordered Nornickel to pay 146 billion rubles ($2 billion) in compensation for the spill damage to support environmental projects in the Krasnoyarsk Territory. The company protested, claiming the real damages were no more than 21 billion rubles ($280 million).

== Culture ==
In Ust-Avam, native Siberian cultural practices and norms are still present and widespread, with hunting being a primary example.

== Infrastructure ==
The village has a secondary school, a kindergarten, a doctor's surgery, a library, a bakery and a post office. Sewerage and water supplies are provided only by the school. The power supply of the village is provided by 4 diesel power plants. In 2004, satellite communications were constructed, followed by mobile communications (MTS) in 2020.

Travel is facilitated by light aircraft with regular flights to neighboring Volochanka. In 1968, a group of Norilsk tourists took a ski trip from Ust-Avam to Talnakh.

== Climate ==
Located in the tundra, Ust-Avam sits on the right bank of the Avam river in the North Siberian Lowland. According to the Köppen climate classification, the climate is subarctic. The average annual temperature -11.4 °C, with the average temperature of the coldest month (January) being -30.9 °C and that of the warmest month (July) being 11.5 °C. The annual average precipitation is 347 mm, with the rainiest season between June and October (the average rainfall in August is 49 mm). Ust-Avam is in the Krasnoyarsk Time Zone, seven hours ahead of UTC (UTC+07:00) and 4 hours ahead of Moscow Time (MSK+4).

== Population and demographics ==
In the 2010 census, the population of Ust-Avam was recorded as 513. In 2017, this had fallen to 336. In this year, the ethnic composition was recorded as:

| Ethnic group | Population | % |
|---|---|---|
| Dolgans | 172 | 51,2 |
| Nganasan | 154 | 45,8 |
| Russians | 9 | 2,7 |
| Nenets | 1 | 0,3 |

In 2018, the population had risen to 339 according to a report into socioeconomic development in the Dudinka region.
