= Pyasina =

River that flows into the Kara Sea

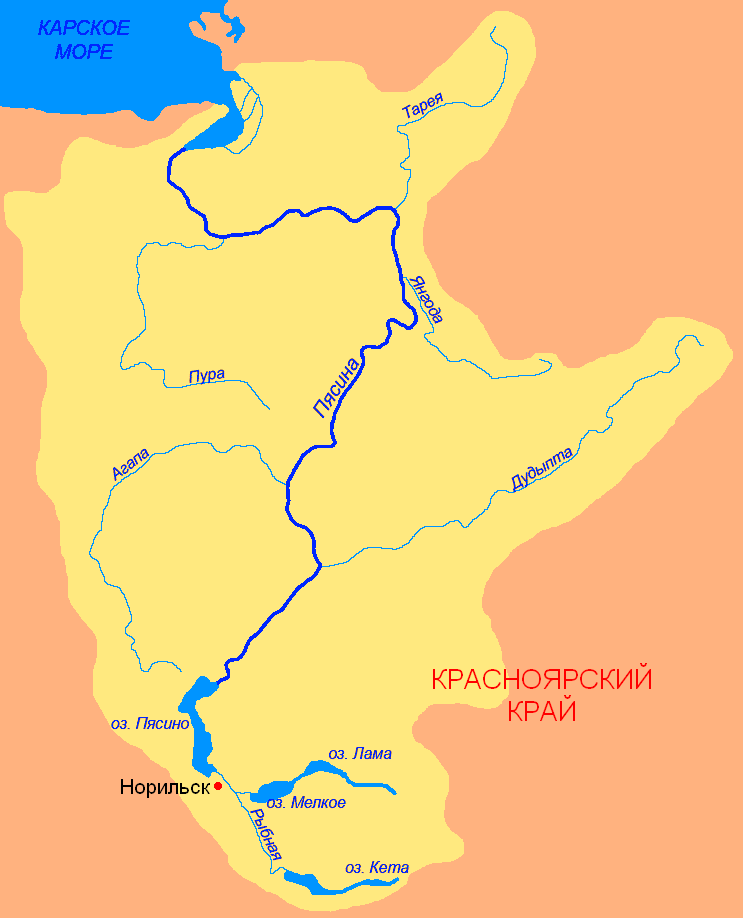
- Basin of the Pyasina
- Native name: Пясина (Russian)

Location
- Country: Russia
- Region: Krasnoyarsk Krai
- City: Ust-Tareya

Physical characteristics
- Source: Lake Pyasino
  - coordinates: 70.0645°N 88.0643°E
  - elevation: 28 m (92 ft)
- Mouth: Kara Sea, Arctic Ocean
  - location: Pyasina Bay
  - coordinates: 73°54′00″N 87°02′50″E
- Length: 818 km (508 mi)
- Basin size: 182,000 km^{2} (70,000 sq mi)
- Discharge
  - average: 2,550 m^{3}/s (90,000 cu ft/s)

Basin features
- Tributaries
  - left: Agapa, Mokoritto, Pura
  - right: Chernaya, Dudypta, Yangoda, Tareya, Binyuda

The Pyasina (Russian: Пясина) is a river in Krasnoyarsk Krai, Russia. The river is 818 kilometres (508 mi) long, and its basin covers 182,000 square kilometres (70,000 mi^{2}). The Pyasina River originates in Lake Pyasino and flows into the Pyasino Gulf of the Kara Sea. There are more than 60,000 lakes in the basin of the Pyasina covering a total area of 10,450 square kilometres (4,030 sq mi). The river freezes up in late September or early October and stays under the ice until June. It is connected to the river Chetyrekh through its right distributary Staritsa.

== History ==
The Dvina merchant Kondratiy Kurochkin reached the mouth of the Pyasina in 1610. In 1614, an ostrog was built on the river to collect yasak from the natives. In 1935, before the Dudinka-Norilsk railway had been built, the river Pyasina and Lake Pyasino were used to deliver cargo to the site of the future city of Norilsk.

== Taimyr reindeer herd ==
The calving grounds of the Taimyr reindeer herd, a migrating tundra reindeer (R.t. sibiricus), the largest reindeer herd in the world, is along the right bank of the Pyasina and at the bend of the middle flow of the Agapa.

== See also ==
- Ambarnaya, an inflow of Lake Pyasino
- List of rivers by discharge
- List of rivers of Russia
