= Volochanka =

Volochanka Волочанка
- Settlement
- Interactive map of Volochanka
- Location of Volochanka Volochanka (Krasnoyarsk Krai)
- Coordinates: 70°58′38″N 94°32′39″E
- Country: Russia
- Federal subject: Krasnoyarsk Krai
- Administrative district: Taymyrsky Dolgano-Nenetsky District
- District townSelsoviet: Dudinka

Population
  - Estimate (2010): 530 )
- Time zone: UTC+7 (MSK+4)
- Postal codes: 647506, 647235
- OKTMO ID: 04653101106

Volochanka (Russian: Волоча́нка) is a rural locality (a settlement) under the administrative jurisdiction of the district town of Dudinka in Taymyrsky Dolgano-Nenetsky District of Krasnoyarsk Krai, Russia. It is located on the Kheta River in the Taymyr Peninsula. Population: 530 people (2010 est.).

== History ==
In 1932, native leaders of three nationalities, including the Dolgan and Yakuts, started a civil uprising in Volochanka against the Bolsheviks; twenty Party workers were killed and many others wounded in the event.

== Demographics ==
The inhabitants include representatives of Taymyr, Dolgans, and Nganasan indigenous peoples.

== Infrastructure ==
The settlement has a boarding school, kindergarten, district hospital, rural cultural center, a library, a branch of the Federal Postal Service, Department of "Telecommunications", and weather station.
