= Rosa Pompanin =

Italian curler

- Curler ♀
- Born: 9 June 1984 (age 42); Pieve di Cadore, Belluno, Veneto, Italy

Team
- Curling club: New Wave CC, Cortina d'Ampezzo

Curling career
- Member Association: Italy
- World Championship: 3 (2003, 2004, 2005)
- European Championship: 5 (2001, 2002, 2003, 2004, 2005)
- Olympic: 1 (2006)
- Other appearances: European Mixed Championship: 1 (2007), World Junior Championships: 4 (2002, 2003, 2004, 2005), Winter Universiade: 1 (2007)
Medal record
Curling
Italian Women's Championship
Gold medal – first place	2002
Gold medal – first place	2004
Gold medal – first place	2005
Silver medal – second place	2003
Bronze medal – third place	2000
Bronze medal – third place	2001
Bronze medal – third place	2013
Bronze medal – third place	2017
World Junior Championships
Bronze medal – third place	2003 Flims

Rosa Pompanin (born 9 June 1984 in Pieve di Cadore, Belluno, Veneto, Italy) is an Italian curler. She is a three-time Italian women's champion (2002, 2004, 2005).

She participated in the 2006 Winter Olympics, where the Italian team finished in tenth place.

== Teams ==
=== Women's ===
Season	Skip	Third	Second	Lead	Alternate	Coach	Events
2001–02	Diana Gaspari	Violetta Caldart	Rosa Pompanin	Chiara Olivieri	Lucrezia Ferrando	Rodger Gustaf Schmidt	ECC 2001 (11th)
2001–02	Diana Gaspari	Rosa Pompanin	Arianna Lorenzi	Eleonora Alverà	Lucrezia Ferrando	Rodger Gustaf Schmidt	WJCC 2002 (4th)
2002–03	Diana Gaspari	Giulia Lacedelli	Rosa Pompanin	Violetta Caldart	Chiara Olivieri (ECC); Arianna Lorenzi (WCC)	Rodger Gustaf Schmidt (ECC); Roberto Lacedelli (WCC)	ECC 2002 (11th); WCC 2003 (9th)
2002–03	Diana Gaspari	Rosa Pompanin	Arianna Lorenzi	Lucrezia Ferrando	Anna Ghiretti	Rodger Gustaf Schmidt	WJCC 2003 (bronze)
2003–04	Diana Gaspari	Giulia Lacedelli	Rosa Pompanin	Violetta Caldart	Chiara Olivieri	Rodger Gustaf Schmidt (ECC); Roberto Lacedelli (WCC)	ECC 2003 (5th); WCC 2004 (9th)
2003–04	Diana Gaspari	Rosa Pompanin	Arianna Lorenzi	Anna Ghiretti	Elettra De Col	Rodger Gustaf Schmidt	WJCC 2004 (9th)
2004–05	Diana Gaspari	Giulia Lacedelli	Rosa Pompanin	Violetta Caldart	Eleonora Alverà	Roberto Lacedelli (ECC); Rodger Gustaf Schmidt (WCC)	ECC 2004 (6th); WCC 2005 (11th)
2004–05	Diana Gaspari	Rosa Pompanin	Arianna Lorenzi	Anna Ghiretti	Giorgia Apollonio		WJCC 2005 (8th)
2005–06	Diana Gaspari	Giulia Lacedelli	Rosa Pompanin	Violetta Caldart	Eleonora Alverà	Rodger Gustaf Schmidt; Roberto Lacedelli	ECC 2005 (6th); WOG 2006 (10th)
2006–07	Diana Gaspari	Rosa Pompanin	Elettra De Col	Deborah Pavan		Rodger Gustaf Schmidt	WUG 2007 (5th)
2016–17	Diana Gaspari	Manuela Serafini	Rosa Pompanin	Alice Cobelli	Giada Mosaner		IWCC 2017 (bronze)
2017–18	Federica Apollonio	Giorgia Apollonio	Stefania Menardi	Claudia Alvera	Rosa Pompanin	Alberto Menardi	IWCC 2018 (4th)

=== Mixed ===
Season	Skip	Third	Second	Lead	Alternate	Events
2007–08	Antonio Menardi	Rosa Pompanin	Fabio Alverà	Claudia Alvera	Massimo Antonelli, Giorgia Casagrande	EMxCC 2007 (9th)
