= Eleonora Alverà =

Italian curler

- Curler ♀
- Born: 26 November 1982 (age 43); Cortina d'Ampezzo, Italy

Team
- Curling club: CC Olimpia Ladies, CC Tofane, Cortina d'Ampezzo

Curling career
- Member Association: Italy
- World Championship: 2 (2005, 2006)
- European Championship: 5 (1999, 2000, 2004, 2005, 2009)
- Olympic: 1 (2006)
- Other appearances: World Junior Championships: 1 (2002)
Medal record
Curling
Italian Women's Championship
| Gold medal – first place | 2010 |

Eleonora Alverà (born 26 November 1982 in Cortina d'Ampezzo, Italy) is an Italian curler. She is a 2010 Italian women's champion.

She participated in the 2006 Winter Olympics, where the Italian team finished in tenth place.

== Teams ==
| Season | Skip | Third | Second | Lead | Alternate | Coach | Events |
|---|---|---|---|---|---|---|---|
| 1999–00 | Giulia Lacedelli | Violetta Caldart | Eleonora Alverà | Isabella Colle | Erica de Salvador | Antonio Menardi | ECC 1999 (10th) |
| 2000–01 | Eleonora Alverà | Isabella Colle | Erica de Salvador | Silvia Barbato | Lucrezia Ferrando | Rodger Gustaf Schmidt; Antonio Menardi | ECC 2000 (12th) |
| 2001–02 | Diana Gaspari | Rosa Pompanin | Arianna Lorenzi | Eleonora Alverà | Lucrezia Ferrando | Rodger Gustaf Schmidt | WJCC 2002 (4th) |
| 2004–05 | Diana Gaspari | Giulia Lacedelli | Rosa Pompanin | Violetta Caldart | Eleonora Alverà | Roberto Lacedelli (ECC); Rodger Gustaf Schmidt (WCC) | ECC 2004 (6th); WCC 2005 (11th) |
| 2005–06 | Diana Gaspari | Giulia Lacedelli | Rosa Pompanin | Violetta Caldart | Eleonora Alverà | Rodger Gustaf Schmidt; Roberto Lacedelli | ECC 2005 (6th); WOG 2006 (10th) |
| 2005–06 | Diana Gaspari | Giulia Lacedelli | Eleonora Alverà | Violetta Caldart | Arianna Lorenzi | Rodger Gustaf Schmidt | WCC 2006 (9th) |
| 2009–10 | Giorgia Apollonio | Eleonora Alverà | Claudia Alverà | Elettra De Col | Georgia De Lotto | | ECC 2009 (9th) |

== Personal life ==
Her father Fabio is also an Italian curler and coach. He played at the 2006 Winter Olympics as a member of the Italian men's team. Her aunt (Fabio's sister) Claudio is an Italian champion curler. Eleonora and Claudia played together at the 2009 European championship. Her brother Alberto is also a curler.
