= Alessandro Zisa =

Italian male curler and coach

- Curler ♂
- Born: 11 April 1965 (age 61); Cortina d'Ampezzo, Italy

Team
- Curling club: CC Dolomiti, Cortina d'Ampezzo
- Mixed doubles partner: Stefania Constantini

Curling career
- Member Association: Italy
- World Championship: 1 (2005)
- European Championship: 10 (1997, 1999, 2000, 2003, 2004, 2005, 2006, 2007, 2008, 2009)
- Other appearances: European Mixed Championship: 1 (2012)
Medal record
Curling

Carlo Alessandro Zisa (born 11 April 1965 in Cortina d'Ampezzo) is an Italian curler and curling coach.

At the national level, he is an eight-time Italian men's champion curler and a 2012 Italian mixed champion curler.

Since 2011 he is a president of the Curling Club Dolomiti in Cortina d'Ampezzo.

== Teams ==
=== Men's ===
Season	Skip	Third	Second	Lead	Alternate	Coach	Events
1997–98	Claudio Pescia	Stefano Ferronato	Alessandro Lettieri	Alessandro Zisa	Gianluca Lorenzi	Fabio Alverà, Otto Danieli	ECC 1997 (13th)
1999–00	Stefano Ferronato	Fabio Alverà	Gianluca Lorenzi	Alessandro Zisa	Marco Mariani		ECC 1999 (12th)
2000–01	Stefano Ferronato	Fabio Alverà	Gianluca Lorenzi	Alessandro Zisa	Marco Mariani	Rodger Gustaf Schmidt	ECC 2000 (12th)
2003–04	Stefano Ferronato	Fabio Alverà	Marco Mariani	Alessandro Zisa	Adriano Lorenzi	Rodger Gustaf Schmidt	ECC 2003 (8th)
2004–05	Stefano Ferronato	Fabio Alverà	Valter Bombassei (ECC); Marco Mariani (WCC)	Alessandro Zisa	Joel Retornaz	Rodger Gustaf Schmidt	ECC 2004 (5th); WCC 2005 (12th)
2005–06	Joel Retornaz	Fabio Alverà	Marco Mariani	Alessandro Zisa	Gian Paolo Zandegiacomo	Rodger Gustaf Schmidt, Jean-Pierre Rütsche	ECC 2005 (9th)
2006–07	Stefano Ferronato	Alessandro Zisa	Marco Mariani	Adriano Lorenzi	Giorgio Da Rin		ECC 2006 (12th)
2007–08	Joël Retornaz	Silvio Zanotelli	Marco Mariani	Alessandro Zisa	Davide Zanotelli	Fabio Alverà	ECC 2007 (10th)
2008–09	Stefano Ferronato	Alessandro Zisa	Gianpaolo Zandegiacomo	Marco Mariani	Giorgio da Rin	Fabio Alverà	ECC 2008 (12th)
2009–10	Stefano Ferronato	Gianpaolo Zandegiacomo	Marco Mariani	Alessandro Zisa	Giorgio da Rin	Jean-Pierre Rütsche	ECC 2009 (10th)
2010–11	Giorgio Da Rin	Alessandro Zisa	Alberto Alverà	Marco Mariani			

=== Mixed ===
Season	Skip	Third	Second	Lead	Alternate	Events
2012–13	Alessandro Zisa	Elettra De Col	Alberto Alverà	Violetta Caldart	Marco Mariani	EMxCC 2012 (16th)

== Record as a coach of national teams ==
Year	Tournament, event	National team	Place
2019	2019 World Junior-B Curling Championships (December)	Italy (junior women)	5
