= Davide Zandiegiacomo =

Italian male curler

- Curler ♂
- Born: 26 November 1972 (age 53); Auronzo di Cadore, Italy

Team
- Curling club: Auros, Auronzo, CC Tre Cime, Auronzo

Curling career
- Member Association: Italy
- World Championship: 1 (1996)
- European Championship: 7 (1993, 1994, 1995, 1996, 2002)
- Other appearances: European Mixed Championship: 1 (2006)
Medal record
Curling
European Mixed Championship
Silver medal – second place	2006 Claut

Davide Zandiegiacomo (born 26 November 1972 in Auronzo di Cadore) is an Italian curler.

At the international level, he is a 2006 European Mixed Curling Championship silver medallist.

At the national level, he is a three-time Italian men's champion curler and a one-time Italian mixed champion curler.

== Teams ==
=== Men's ===
Season	Skip	Third	Second	Lead	Alternate	Coach	Events
1993–94	Gianpaolo Zandegiacomo	Valter Bombassei	Davide Zandiegiacomo	Diego Bombassei			ECC 1993 (14th)
1994–95	Claudio Pescia	Gianpaolo Zandegiacomo	Valter Bombassei	Davide Zandiegiacomo	Diego Bombassei	Lino Mariani Maier	ECC 1994 (11th)
1995–96	Claudio Pescia	Gianpaolo Zandegiacomo	Valter Bombassei	Davide Zandiegiacomo	Diego Bombassei	Otto Danieli	ECC 1995 (4th)
1995–96	Claudio Pescia	Gianpaolo Zandegiacomo	Valter Bombassei	Diego Bombassei	Davide Zandiegiacomo		WCC 1996 (8th)
1996–97	Claudio Pescia	Valter Bombassei	Davide Zandiegiacomo	Diego Bombassei	Fabio Alverà	Otto Danieli	ECC 1996 (10th)
2002–03	Gianpaolo Zandegiacomo	Valter Bombassei	Davide Zandiegiacomo	Diego Bombassei	Antonio Menardi	Rodger Gustaf Schmidt	ECC 2002 (11th)

=== Mixed ===
Season	Skip	Third	Second	Lead	Alternate	Events
2006–07	Valter Bombassei	Chiara Olivieri	Davide Zandiegiacomo	Sara Zandegiacomo	Marco Constantini, Elettra De Col	EMxCC 2006 (silver)

== Private life ==
His older brother Gianpaolo Zandegiacomo is also an Italian curler. they was teammates played on European and World championships.
