= Valter Bombassei =

Italian male curler

- Curler ♂
- Born: 27 May 1965 (age 61); Auronzo di Cadore, Italy

Team
- Curling club: Auros, Auronzo, CC 66 Cortina, Cortina d'Ampezzo

Curling career
- Member Association: Italy
- World Championship: 1 (1996)
- European Championship: 7 (1993, 1994, 1995, 1996, 1998, 2002, 2004)
- Other appearances: European Mixed Championship: 2 (2006, 2011), World Senior Championships: 3 (2017, 2018, 2019)
Medal record
Curling
European Mixed Championship
Silver medal – second place	2006 Claut

Valter Bombassei De Bona (born 27 May 1965 in Auronzo di Cadore) is an Italian curler.

At the international level, he is a 2006 European Mixed Curling Championship silver medallist.

At the national level, he is a three-time Italian men's champion curler and a two-time Italian mixed champion curler.

== Teams ==
=== Men's ===
Season	Skip	Third	Second	Lead	Alternate	Coach	Events
1993–94	Gianpaolo Zandegiacomo	Valter Bombassei	Davide Zandiegiacomo	Diego Bombassei			ECC 1993 (14th)
1994–95	Claudio Pescia	Gianpaolo Zandegiacomo	Valter Bombassei	Davide Zandiegiacomo	Diego Bombassei	Lino Mariani Maier	ECC 1994 (11th)
1995–96	Claudio Pescia	Gianpaolo Zandegiacomo	Valter Bombassei	Davide Zandiegiacomo	Diego Bombassei	Otto Danieli	ECC 1995 (4th)
1995–96	Claudio Pescia	Gianpaolo Zandegiacomo	Valter Bombassei	Diego Bombassei	Davide Zandiegiacomo		WCC 1996 (8th)
1996–97	Claudio Pescia	Valter Bombassei	Davide Zandiegiacomo	Diego Bombassei	Fabio Alverà	Otto Danieli	ECC 1996 (10th)
1998–99	Claudio Pescia	Gianpaolo Zandegiacomo	Valter Bombassei	Marco Mariani	Diego Bombassei	Otto Danieli	ECC 1998 (15th)
2002–03	Gianpaolo Zandegiacomo	Valter Bombassei	Davide Zandiegiacomo	Diego Bombassei	Antonio Menardi	Rodger Gustaf Schmidt	ECC 2002 (11th)
2004–05	Stefano Ferronato	Fabio Alverà	Valter Bombassei	Alessandro Zisa	Joel Retornaz	Rodger Gustaf Schmidt	ECC 2004 (5th)
2005–06	Joel Retornaz	Fabio Alverà	Valter Bombassei	Alessandro Zisa			
2016–17	Valter Bombassei	Marco Constantini	Gianandrea Gallinatto	Mauro Ottino	Stefano Benedetto		WSCC 2017 (18th)
2017–18	Antonio Menardi (fourth)	Valter Bombassei	Marco Constantini	Roberto Lacedelli (skip)			WSCC 2018 (15th)
2018–19	Antonio Menardi	Valter Bombassei	Marco Constantini	Massimo Tortia			WSCC 2019 (15th)

=== Mixed ===
Season	Skip	Third	Second	Lead	Alternate	Events
2006–07	Valter Bombassei	Chiara Olivieri	Davide Zandiegiacomo	Sara Zandegiacomo	Marco Constantini; Elettra De Col	EMxCC 2006 (silver)
2011–12	Valter Bombassei	Chiara Olivieri	Marco Constantini	Giorgia Casagrande	Massimo Antonelli; Maria Gaspari	EMxCC 2011 (6th)

== Private life ==
His cousin is Diego Bombassei, also an Italian curler. They were teammates who played in European and World championships.
