= Fabio Alverà =

Italian male curler and coach

- Curler ♂
- Born: 1 June 1959 (age 67); Cortina d'Ampezzo, Italy

Team
- Curling club: CC Tofane, Cortina d'Ampezzo

Curling career
- Member Association: Italy
- World Championship: 4 (1986, 1989, 1990, 2005)
- European Championship: 12 (1985, 1986, 1987, 1988, 1989, 1992, 1996, 1999, 2000, 2003, 2004, 2005)
- Olympic: 1 (2006)
- Other appearances: European Mixed Championship: 2 (2007, 2008), World Senior Championship: 1 (2012)
Medal record
Curling

Fabio Alverà (born 1 June 1959 in Cortina d'Ampezzo) is an Italian curler and curling coach.

He participated in the 2006 Winter Olympics, where the Italian men's team finished in seventh place.

== Teams ==
=== Men's ===
Season	Skip	Third	Second	Lead	Alternate	Coach	Events
1985–86	Andrea Pavani	Franco Sovilla	Fabio Alverà	Stefano Morona	Enea Pavani (WCC)		ECC 1985 (12th); WCC 1986 (10th)
1986–87	Andrea Pavani	Franco Sovilla	Fabio Alverà	Stefano Morona			ECC 1986 (4th)
1987–88	Fabio Alverà	Adriano Lorenzi	Stefano Morona	Stefano Zardini			ECC 1987 (10th)
1988–89	Fabio Alverà	Stefano Morona	Adriano Lorenzi	Stefano Zardini			ECC 1988 (8th)
1988–89	Andrea Pavani	Adriano Lorenzi	Fabio Alverà	Stefano Morona	Stefano Zardini		WCC 1989 (7th)
1989–90	Andrea Pavani	Fabio Alverà	Franco Sovilla	Stefano Morona	Stefano Zardini (WCC)		ECC 1989 (9th); WCC 1990 (9th)
1992–93	Fabio Alverà	Franco Sovilla	Stefano Morona	Stefano Zardini			ECC 1992 (14th)
1996–97	Claudio Pescia	Valter Bombassei	Davide Zandiegiacomo	Diego Bombassei	Fabio Alverà	Otto Danieli	ECC 1996 (10th)
1999–00	Stefano Ferronato	Fabio Alverà	Gianluca Lorenzi	Alessandro Zisa	Marco Mariani		ECC 1999 (12th)
2000–01	Stefano Ferronato	Fabio Alverà	Gianluca Lorenzi	Alessandro Zisa	Marco Mariani	Rodger Gustaf Schmidt	ECC 2000 (12th)
2003–04	Stefano Ferronato	Fabio Alverà	Marco Mariani	Alessandro Zisa	Adriano Lorenzi	Rodger Gustaf Schmidt	ECC 2003 (8th)
2004–05	Stefano Ferronato	Fabio Alverà	Valter Bombassei (ECC); Marco Mariani (WCC)	Alessandro Zisa	Joel Retornaz	Rodger Gustaf Schmidt	ECC 2004 (5th); WCC 2005 (12th)
2005–06	Joel Retornaz	Fabio Alverà	Marco Mariani	Alessandro Zisa	Gian Paolo Zandegiacomo	Rodger Gustaf Schmidt; Jean-Pierre Rütsche	ECC 2005 (9th)
2005–06	Joel Retornaz	Fabio Alverà	Gian Paolo Zandegiacomo	Marco Mariani	Antonio Menardi	Hans Peter Ruschke	WOG 2006 (7th)
2011–12	Antonio Menardi	Fabio Alverà	Giorgio Alberti	Stefano Morona	Franco Sovilla	Valerio Constantini	WSCC 2012 (12th)

=== Mixed ===
Season	Skip	Third	Second	Lead	Alternate	Events
2007–08	Antonio Menardi	Rosa Pompanin	Fabio Alverà	Claudia Alvera	Massimo Antonelli; Giorgia Casagrande	EMxCC 2007 (9th)
2008–09	Antonio Menardi	Giorgia Apollonio	Fabio Alverà	Claudia Alvera	Massimo Antonelli; Lucrezia Salvai	EMxCC 2008 (9th)

== Record as a coach of national teams ==
Year	Tournament, event	National team	Place
1997	1997 European Curling Championships	Italy (men)	13
2007	2007 European Curling Championships	Italy (men)	10
2008	2008 European Curling Championships	Italy (men)	12
2010	2010 World Men's Curling Championship	Italy (men)	10
2012	2012 European Curling Championships	Italy (women)	6
2013	2013 World Women's Curling Championship	Italy (women)	10

== Personal life ==
His daughter Eleonora is also an Italian curler. She played in the 2006 Winter Olympics as a member of the Italian women's team. His sister Claudio is an Italian champion curler. Eleonora and Claudia played together at the 2009 European championship. His son Alberto is also a curler.
