= Antonio Menardi =

Italian male curler and coach

- Curler ♂
- Born: 5 March 1959 (age 67); Cortina d'Ampezzo, Italy

Team
- Curling club: CC Tofane, Cortina d'Ampezzo

Curling career
- Member Association: Italy
- European Championship: 1 (2002)
- Olympic: 1 (2006)
- Other appearances: European Mixed Championship: 3 (2005, 2007, 2008), World Senior Championship: 4 (2012, 2018, 2019, 2025)
Medal record
Curling

Antonio Menardi (born 5 March 1959 in Cortina d'Ampezzo) is an Italian curler and curling coach.

He participated in the 2006 Winter Olympics, where the Italian men's team finished in seventh place.

== Teams ==
=== Men's ===
Season	Skip	Third	Second	Lead	Alternate	Coach	Events
2002–03	Gianpaolo Zandegiacomo	Valter Bombassei	Davide Zandiegiacomo	Diego Bombassei	Antonio Menardi	Rodger Gustaf Schmidt	ECC 2002 (11th)
2005–06	Joel Retornaz	Fabio Alverà	Gianpaolo Zandegiacomo	Marco Mariani	Antonio Menardi	Hans Peter Ruschke	WOG 2006 (7th)
2011–12	Antonio Menardi	Fabio Alverà	Giorgio Alberti	Stefano Morona	Franco Sovilla	Valerio Constantini	WSCC 2012 (12th)
2017–18	Antonio Menardi (fourth)	Valter Bombassei	Marco Constantini	Roberto Lacedelli (skip)			WSCC 2018 (15th)
2018–19	Guido Fassina	Elia De Pol	Antonio Menardi	Marcello Pachner	Malko Tondella	Alberto Menardi	IMCC 2019 (8th)
2018–19	Antonio Menardi	Valter Bombassei	Marco Constantini	Massimo Tortia			WSCC 2019 (15th)

=== Mixed ===
Season	Skip	Third	Second	Lead	Alternate	Events
2005–06	Antonio Menardi	Claudia Alverà	Massimo Antonelli	Anna Ghiretti	Alberto Menardi, Giorgia Apollonio	EMxCC 2005 (7th)
2007–08	Antonio Menardi	Rosa Pompanin	Fabio Alverà	Claudia Alvera	Massimo Antonelli, Giorgia Casagrande	EMxCC 2007 (9th)
2008–09	Antonio Menardi	Giorgia Apollonio	Fabio Alverà	Claudia Alvera	Massimo Antonelli, Lucrezia Salvai	EMxCC 2008 (9th)

=== Mixed doubles ===
Season	Male	Female	Events
2018–19	Antonio Menardi	Claudia Alverà	IMDCC 2019 (17th)

== Record as a coach of national teams ==
Year	Tournament, event	National team	Place
1999	1999 European Curling Championships	Italy (women)	10
2000	2000 European Curling Championships	Italy (women)	12
2013	2013 World Women's Curling Championship	Italy (women)	10
