= Stefano Ferronato =

Italian male curler

- Curler ♂
- Born: 29 December 1968 (age 57); Cortina d'Ampezzo, Italy

Team
- Curling club: CC Dolomiti, Cortina d'Ampezzo

Curling career
- Member Association: Italy
- World Championship: 1 (2005)
- European Championship: 8 (1997, 1999, 2000, 2003, 2004, 2006, 2008, 2009)
- Other appearances: World Junior Championship: 5 (1986, 1987, 1988, 1989, 1990)
Medal record
Curling

Stefano Ferronato (born 29 December 1968 in Cortina d'Ampezzo) is an Italian curler.

At the national level, he is a seven-time Italian men's champion curler.

== Teams ==
Season	Skip	Third	Second	Lead	Alternate	Coach	Events
1985–86	Stefano Ferronato	Gianluca Lorenzi	Elio Maran	Marco Alberti			WJCC 1986 (10th)
1986–87	Stefano Ferronato	Gianluca Lorenzi	Elio Maran	Marco Alberti			WJCC 1987 (10th)
1987–88	Stefano Ferronato	Gianluca Lorenzi	Elio Maran	Marco Alberti			WJCC 1988 (10th)
1988–89	Stefano Ferronato	Gianluca Lorenzi	Gianpaolo Zandegiacomo	Marco Alberti			WJCC 1989 (8th)
1989–90	Stefano Ferronato	Gianluca Lorenzi	Marco Alberti	Alessandro Lettieri			WJCC 1990 (8th)
1997–98	Claudio Pescia	Stefano Ferronato	Alessandro Lettieri	Alessandro Zisa	Gianluca Lorenzi	Fabio Alverà, Otto Danieli	ECC 1997 (13th)
1999–00	Stefano Ferronato	Fabio Alverà	Gianluca Lorenzi	Alessandro Zisa	Marco Mariani		ECC 1999 (12th)
2000–01	Stefano Ferronato	Fabio Alverà	Gianluca Lorenzi	Alessandro Zisa	Marco Mariani	Rodger Gustaf Schmidt	ECC 2000 (12th)
2003–04	Stefano Ferronato	Fabio Alverà	Marco Mariani	Alessandro Zisa	Adriano Lorenzi	Rodger Gustaf Schmidt	ECC 2003 (8th)
2004–05	Stefano Ferronato	Fabio Alverà	Valter Bombassei (ECC); Marco Mariani (WCC)	Alessandro Zisa	Joel Retornaz	Rodger Gustaf Schmidt	ECC 2004 (5th); WCC 2005 (12th)
2006–07	Stefano Ferronato	Alessandro Zisa	Marco Mariani	Adriano Lorenzi	Giorgio Da Rin		ECC 2006 (12th)
2008–09	Stefano Ferronato	Alessandro Zisa	Gianpaolo Zandegiacomo	Marco Mariani	Giorgio da Rin	Fabio Alverà	ECC 2008 (12th)
2009–10	Stefano Ferronato	Gianpaolo Zandegiacomo	Marco Mariani	Alessandro Zisa	Giorgio da Rin	Jean-Pierre Rütsche	ECC 2009 (10th)
