= Gianpaolo Zandegiacomo =

Italian male curler

- Curler ♂
- Born: 19 February 1968 (age 58); Auronzo di Cadore, Italy

Team
- Curling club: Auros, Auronzo, CC Dolomiti, Cortina d'Ampezzo

Curling career
- Member Association: Italy
- World Championship: 1 (1996)
- European Championship: 8 (1993, 1994, 1995, 1998, 2002, 2005, 2008, 2009)
- Olympic: 1 (2006)
- Other appearances: World Junior Championship: 1 (1989)
Medal record
Curling

Giovanni Paolo "Gianpaolo" Zandegiacomo Bianco (born 19 February 1968 in Auronzo di Cadore) is an Italian curler.

He participated in the 2006 Winter Olympics, where the Italian men's team finished in seventh place.

== Teams ==
Season	Skip	Third	Second	Lead	Alternate	Coach	Events
1988–89	Stefano Ferronato	Gianluca Lorenzi	Gianpaolo Zandegiacomo	Marco Alberti			WJCC 1989 (8th)
1993–94	Gianpaolo Zandegiacomo	Valter Bombassei	Davide Zandiegiacomo	Diego Bombassei			ECC 1993 (14th)
1994–95	Claudio Pescia	Gianpaolo Zandegiacomo	Valter Bombassei	Davide Zandiegiacomo	Diego Bombassei	Lino Mariani Maier	ECC 1994 (11th)
1995–96	Claudio Pescia	Gianpaolo Zandegiacomo	Valter Bombassei	Davide Zandiegiacomo	Diego Bombassei	Otto Danieli	ECC 1995 (4th)
1995–96	Claudio Pescia	Gianpaolo Zandegiacomo	Valter Bombassei	Diego Bombassei	Davide Zandiegiacomo		WCC 1996 (8th)
1998–99	Claudio Pescia	Gianpaolo Zandegiacomo	Valter Bombassei	Marco Mariani	Diego Bombassei	Otto Danieli	ECC 1998 (15th)
2002–03	Gianpaolo Zandegiacomo	Valter Bombassei	Davide Zandiegiacomo	Diego Bombassei	Antonio Menardi	Rodger Gustaf Schmidt	ECC 2002 (11th)
2005–06	Joel Retornaz	Fabio Alverà	Marco Mariani	Alessandro Zisa	Gianpaolo Zandegiacomo	Rodger Gustaf Schmidt, Jean-Pierre Rütsche	ECC 2005 (9th)
2005–06	Joel Retornaz	Fabio Alverà	Gianpaolo Zandegiacomo	Marco Mariani	Antonio Menardi	Hans Peter Ruschke	WOG 2006 (7th)
2007–08	Joel Retornaz	Silvio Zanotelli	Gianpaolo Zandegiacomo	Davide Zanotelli			
2008–09	Stefano Ferronato	Alessandro Zisa	Gianpaolo Zandegiacomo	Marco Mariani	Giorgio da Rin	Fabio Alverà	ECC 2008 (12th)
2009–10	Stefano Ferronato	Gianpaolo Zandegiacomo	Marco Mariani	Alessandro Zisa	Giorgio da Rin	Jean-Pierre Rütsche	ECC 2009 (10th)

== Private life ==
His younger brother Davide Zandiegiacomo, also an Italian curler, they was teammates played on European and World championships.
