= Diego Bombassei =

Italian male curler

- Curler ♂
- Born: 26 May 1971 (age 55); Auronzo di Cadore, Italy

Team
- Curling club: Auros, Auronzo, CC Tre Cime, Auronzo

Curling career
- Member Association: Italy
- World Championship: 1 (1996)
- European Championship: 7 (1993, 1994, 1995, 1996, 1998, 2002)
Medal record
Curling

Diego Bombassei (born 26 May 1971 in Auronzo di Cadore) is an Italian curler.

At the national level, he is a three-time Italian men's champion curler.

== Teams ==
Season	Skip	Third	Second	Lead	Alternate	Coach	Events
1993–94	Gianpaolo Zandegiacomo	Valter Bombassei	Davide Zandiegiacomo	Diego Bombassei			ECC 1993 (14th)
1994–95	Claudio Pescia	Gianpaolo Zandegiacomo	Valter Bombassei	Davide Zandiegiacomo	Diego Bombassei	Lino Mariani Maier	ECC 1994 (11th)
1995–96	Claudio Pescia	Gianpaolo Zandegiacomo	Valter Bombassei	Davide Zandiegiacomo	Diego Bombassei	Otto Danieli	ECC 1995 (4th)
1995–96	Claudio Pescia	Gianpaolo Zandegiacomo	Valter Bombassei	Diego Bombassei	Davide Zandiegiacomo		WCC 1996 (8th)
1996–97	Claudio Pescia	Valter Bombassei	Davide Zandiegiacomo	Diego Bombassei	Fabio Alverà	Otto Danieli	ECC 1996 (10th)
1998–99	Claudio Pescia	Gianpaolo Zandegiacomo	Valter Bombassei	Marco Mariani	Diego Bombassei	Otto Danieli	ECC 1998 (15th)
2002–03	Gianpaolo Zandegiacomo	Valter Bombassei	Davide Zandiegiacomo	Diego Bombassei	Antonio Menardi	Rodger Gustaf Schmidt	ECC 2002 (11th)

== Private life ==
His cousin is Valter Bombassei, also an Italian curler. They were teammates and played in European and World championships.
