= 2006 European Mixed Curling Championship =

- Host city: Claut, Friuli-Venezia Giulia, Italy
- Dates: October 17–21, 2006
- Winner: Scotland
- Skip: Tom Brewster
- Third: Jackie Lockhart
- Second: David Hay
- Lead: Kim Brewster
- Finalist: Italy (Valter Bombassei)

The 2006 European Mixed Curling Championship was held from October 17 to 21, 2006 in Claut, Friuli-Venezia Giulia, Italy.

Scotland, skipped by Tom Brewster, won its first title, defeating Italy in the final.

== Teams ==
The teams are as follows:

Country	Skip	Third	Second	Lead	Alternate(s)
Austria	Markus Schagerl	Verena Hagenbuchner	Rainer M.M. Ammer	Jasmin Seidl	
Czech Republic	Karel Kubeška	Miroslava Vařečková	Ludek Munzar	Renée Lepiskova	Miloš Hoferka, Anna Kubešková
Denmark	Casper Bossen	Mona Sylvest Nielsen	Kim Sylvest Nielsen	Lisa Sylvest Nielsen	
Estonia	Martin Lill	Ööle Janson	Jan Anderson	Marju Velga	Siim Sildnik, Kristiine Lill
Finland	Jussi Uusipaavalniemi	Anne Malmi	Petri Tsutsunen	Johanna Pyyhtia	Olavi Malmi
France	Vianney Leudiere	Stephanie Jaccaz	Jean-Xavier Cheval	Andrée Dupont-Roc	
Germany	Roland Jentsch	Daniela Jentsch	Uli Sutor	Marika Trettin	Helmar Erlewein
Hungary	Zsombor Rokusfalvy	Orsi Rokusfalvy	András Rokusfalvy	Zsofi Rokusfalvy	Gabor Riesz, Ildi Farkas
Ireland	Johnjo Kenny	Marie O'Kane	Tony Tierney	Mary Kerr	
Italy	Valter Bombassei	Chiara Olivieri	Davide Zandiegiacomo	Sara Zandegiacomo	Marco Constantini, Elettra De Col
Kazakhstan	Yekaterina Gorkusha	Viktor Kim	Olga Ten	Bashir Chimirov	Olga Zaitseva, Zhanibek Ukubayev
Latvia	Artis Zentelis	Zanda Bikše	Mārtiņš Trukšāns	Una Grava-Ģērmane	Dace Munča
Lithuania	Andrius Jurkonis	Viktorija Jagniatinskaja	Mindaugas Jusius	Kristina Rutkauskaite	
Netherlands	Gerrit-Jan Scholten (fourth)	Margreet Poost (skip)	Marco van Vliet	Alie Kramer	Jeroen Postma, Jeanette Kiers
Norway	Ole Hauge	Anne Grethe Bremnes	Finn Pettersen	Hilde Stenseth	
Poland	Arkadiusz Detyniecki	Marta Szeliga-Frynia	Pawel Frynia	Marianna Das	Agnieszka Czaplicka, Wojciech Woyda
Russia	Alexander Kirikov	Daria Kozlova	Dmitri Abanin	Julia Svetova	Andrey Drozdov, Angela Tuvaeva
Scotland	Tom Brewster	Jackie Lockhart	David Hay	Kim Brewster	
Slovakia	Pavel Kocián	Katarina Langova	Ronald Krcmar	Veronika Kvasnovska	
Spain	Antonio De Mollinedo Gonzalez	Ellen Kittelsen	José Manuel Sangüesa Anzano	Ana Arce	Leticia Hinojosa de Torres, Jos‚ Luis Hinojosa de Torres-Peralta
Sweden	Per Noréen	Camilla Johansson	Flemming Patz	Susanne Patz	
Switzerland	Jan Hauser	Carmen Küng	Stefan Karnusian	Petra Feldmann	Manuela Kormann, Stephan Rüdisühli
Wales	Lesley Gregory	Peter Williams	Helen Lyon	Scott Lyon	Madzia Williams, Martin Gregory

== Round Robin ==
In every group: two best teams to playoffs.

=== Group A ===
Place	Team	1	2	3	4	5	6	Wins	Losses
1	Switzerland	*	10:4	7:1	7:6	10:2	13:5	5	0
2	Finland	4:10	*	10:6	7:4	10:2	11:3	4	1
3	Denmark	1:7	6:10	*	9:5	12:4	14:4	3	2
4	Hungary	6:7	4:7	5:9	*	6:3	10:3	2	3
5	Wales	2:10	2:10	4:12	3:6	*	11:4	1	4
6	Lithuania	5:13	3:11	4:14	3:10	4:11	*	0	5

Team to playoffs

=== Group B ===
Place	Team	1	2	3	4	5	6	Wins	Losses
1	Sweden	*	11:5	9:5	4:8	7:2	9:3	4	1
2	Italy	5:11	*	7:1	8:2	8:4	10:2	4	1
3	Estonia	5:9	1:7	*	9:3	9:2	7:5	3	2
4	Austria	8:4	2:8	3:9	*	7:9	9:7	2	3
5	Spain	2:7	4:8	2:9	9:7	*	5:9	1	4
6	Slovakia	3:9	2:10	5:7	7:9	9:5	*	1	4

Team to playoffs

=== Group C ===
Place	Team	1	2	3	4	5	6	Wins	Losses
1	Russia	*	8:5	4:0	9:3	16:1	11:5	5	0
2	Latvia	5:8	*	7:2	5:9	9:6	11:1	3	2
3	Germany	0:4	2:7	*	5:2	14:1	12:4	3	2
4	Ireland	3:9	9:5	2:5	*	11:4	10:3	3	2
5	Netherlands	1:16	6:9	1:14	4:11	*	10:6	1	4
6	Kazakhstan	5:11	1:11	4:12	3:10	6:10	*	0	5

Team to playoffs
Teams to tie-break for 2nd place

==== Tie-break ====
Winner of Round 2 to playoffs

Round 1

Sheet D	1	2	3	4	5	6	7	8	Final
Germany	1	0	0	1	1	1	0	0	4
Ireland	0	2	1	0	0	0	1	1	5

Round 2

Sheet E	1	2	3	4	5	6	7	8	Final
Latvia	1	0	0	0	0	0	X	X	1
Ireland	0	1	1	3	3	1	X	X	9

=== Group D ===
Place	Team	1	2	3	4	5	Wins	Losses
1	Scotland	*	7:4	6:3	9:1	9:2	4	0
2	Czech Republic	4:7	*	3:5	7:4	8:2	2	2
3	Poland	3:6	5:3	*	12:2	3:8	2	2
4	Norway	1:9	4:7	2:12	*	9:5	1	3
5	France	2:9	2:8	8:3	5:9	*	1	3

Team to playoffs
Teams to tie-break for 2nd place

==== Tie-break ====
Sheet C	1	2	3	4	5	6	7	8	Final
Czech Republic	2	0	0	0	3	0	1	2	8
Poland	0	3	1	1	0	2	0	0	7

== Playoffs ==
Quarterfinals
A-1	Switzerland	5
B-2	Italy	6
C-1	Russia	6
D-2	Czech Republic	3
B-1	Sweden	3
C-2	Ireland	2
A-2	Finland	5
D-1	Scotland	6

Semifinals
Italy	7
Russia	5
Sweden	2
Scotland	5

Final
Italy	4
Scotland	8
Third place
Russia	5
Sweden	2

=== Quarterfinals ===
October 20, 19:00

Sheet A	1	2	3	4	5	6	7	8	Final
Sweden	0	0	0	0	0	2	0	1	3
Ireland	0	1	0	0	0	0	1	0	2

Sheet B	1	2	3	4	5	6	7	8	Final
Russia	0	0	1	0	0	0	5	0	6
Czech Republic	0	0	0	2	0	0	0	1	3

Sheet C	1	2	3	4	5	6	7	8	9	Final
Italy	1	0	1	0	0	1	1	1	1	6
Switzerland	0	3	0	1	1	0	0	0	0	5

Sheet D	1	2	3	4	5	6	7	8	Final
Finland	0	2	0	2	0	1	0	0	5
Scotland	1	0	1	0	3	0	0	1	6

=== Semifinals ===
October 21, 10:00

Sheet A	1	2	3	4	5	6	7	8	Final
Russia	0	1	1	0	1	0	2	0	5
Italy	1	0	0	1	0	4	0	1	7

Sheet D	1	2	3	4	5	6	7	8	Final
Scotland	0	0	0	2	0	2	0	1	5
Sweden	0	1	0	0	0	0	1	0	2

=== Bronze medal game ===
October 21, 14:00

Sheet E	1	2	3	4	5	6	7	8	Final
Sweden	0	0	1	0	0	0	1	X	2
Russia	0	2	0	1	1	1	0	X	5

=== Final ===
October 21, 14:00

Sheet B	1	2	3	4	5	6	7	8	Final
Italy	0	1	0	0	0	2	1	0	4
Scotland	2	0	1	0	3	0	0	2	8

== Final standings ==
Place	Team	Games	Wins	Losses
1st place, gold medalist(s)	Scotland	7	7	0
2nd place, silver medalist(s)	Italy	8	6	2
3rd place, bronze medalist(s)	Russia	8	7	1
4	Sweden	8	5	3
5	Switzerland	6	5	1
6	Finland	6	4	2
7	Ireland	8	5	3
8	Czech Republic	6	3	3
9	Latvia	6	3	3
10	Germany	6	3	3
11	Poland	5	2	3
12	Denmark	5	3	2
13	Estonia	5	3	2
14	Hungary	5	2	3
15	Austria	5	2	3
16	Norway	4	1	3
17	France	4	1	3
18	Slovakia	5	1	4
19	Wales	5	1	4
20	Spain	5	1	4
21	Netherlands	5	1	4
22	Kazakhstan	5	0	5
23	Lithuania	5	0	5

2006 European Mixed Curling Championship
(Scotland)
Scotland
1st title
