= 1988 World Junior Curling Championships =

- Host city: Men: Füssen, West Germany; Women: Chamonix, France
- Dates: Men: March 13–19; Women: March 19–25
- Men's winner: Canada (6th title)
- Skip: James "Jim" Sullivan
- Third: Charles Sullivan
- Second: Craig Burgess
- Lead: Danny Alderman
- Finalist: Sweden (Peter Lindholm)
- Women's winner: Canada (1st title)
- Skip: Julie Sutton
- Third: Judy Wood
- Second: Susan Auty
- Lead: Marla Geiger
- Finalist: Switzerland (Marianne Amstutz)

The 1988 World Junior Curling Championships were held from March 13 to 19 in Füssen, West Germany for the men's competition and from March 19 to 25 in Chamonix, France for the women's competition. While it was the 14th junior men's competition, this was the inaugural year for the junior women's competition. It has also been the only year that the men's and women's competitions were held separately.

The men's event (sponsored by Uniroyal) was won by Canada, skipped by Jim Sullivan and his rink from Fredericton, New Brunswick.

The women's event was won also won by Canada, skipped by University of Victoria student Julie Sutton's Kelowna, British Columbia rink.

== Men ==
=== Teams ===
Country	Skip	Third	Second	Lead	Alternate
Canada	Jim Sullivan	Charles Sullivan	Craig Burgess	Danny Alderman	
Denmark	Torben Nielsen	Julich Wiberg	Brian Enggaard	Christian Petri	
France	Thierry Mercier	Lionel Tournier	Christian Cossetto	René-Georges Wohlfei	Jan Henri Ducroz
West Germany	Bernhard Mayr	Mark Sarty	Ralph Schwarzwalder	Andreas Feldenkirchen	
Italy	Stefano Ferronato	Gianluca Lorenzi	Elio Maran	Marco Alberti	
Norway	Thomas Ulsrud	Thomas Due	Krister Aanesen	Mads Rygg	
Scotland	Alistair Scott	Peter Loudon	Derek Brown	Douglas Taylor	
Sweden	Peter Lindholm	Magnus Swartling	Johan Hansson	Niklas Kallerbäck	
Switzerland	Christof Schwaller	Christoph Kaiser	Beat Wyler	Peter Hostettler	
United States	Will Marquardt	Jim Falk	Jeff Falk	Kurt Marquardt	

=== Round Robin Standings ===
Country	Wins	Losses
Canada	8	1
Switzerland	8	1
Sweden	6	3
Norway	5	4
Denmark	4	5
Scotland	4	5
United States	4	5
West Germany	3	6
France	3	6
Italy	0	9

=== Playoffs ===
Semifinals
1	Canada	6
4	Norway	4
2	Switzerland	5
3	Sweden	7

Gold Medal Game
1	Canada	4
2	Sweden	2
Bronze Medal Game
4	Norway	5
2	Switzerland	2

==== Gold medal final ====
Team	1	2	3	4	5	6	7	8	9	10	Final
Canada (Sullivan)	2	0	0	0	2	0	0	0	0	X	4
Sweden (Lindholm)	0	0	0	1	0	0	1	0	0	X	2

Player percentages
Sweden		Canada	
Niklas Kallerbäck	81%	Dan Alderman	76%
Johan Hansson	83%	Craig Burgess	91%
Magnus Swartling	81%	Charlie Sullivan	88%
Peter Lindholm	68%	Jim Sullivan	90%
Total		Total	

==== Bronze medal final ====
Team	1	2	3	4	5	6	7	8	9	10	Final
Norway (Ulsrud)	1	0	2	1	0	0	1	0	0	X	5
Switzerland (Schwaller)	0	1	0	0	1	0	0	0	0	X	2

=== All Stars ===
- Skip: (Canada) Jim Sullivan
- Third: (Canada) Charlie Sullivan
- Second: (Canada) Craig Burgess
- Lead: (Switzerland) Peter Hostettler

Additionally, Derek Brown of Scotland won the sportsmanship award.

== Women ==
=== Teams ===
Country	Skip	Third	Second	Lead
Canada	Julie Sutton	Judy Wood	Susan Auty	Marla Geiger
Denmark	Lene Bidstrup	Linda Laursen	Avijaja Petri	Kinnie Steensen
France	Karine Caux	Géraldine Girod (skip)	Chrystelle Fournier	Véronique Girod
West Germany	Simone Vogel	Kerstin Jüders	Angelika Schaffer	Sabine Belkofer
Norway	Nina Grimmer	Trine Helgebostad	Cathrine Ulrichsen	Bettina Graham
Scotland	Carolyn Hutchison	Rhona Howie	Joan Robertson	Tara Brown
Sweden	Elisabeth Hansson	Annika Lööf (skip)	Catharina Eklund	Malin Lundberg
Switzerland	Marianne Amstutz	Sandra Bracher	Stephanie Walter	Franziska von Känel
United States	Tracy Zeman	Erika Brown	Marni Vaningan	Shellie Holerud

=== Round Robin Standings ===
Country	Wins	Losses
Canada	7	1
Switzerland	6	2
Denmark	5	3
Scotland	4	4
Norway	4	4
Sweden	3	5
France	3	5
United States	2	6
West Germany	2	6

==== Tiebreaker ====
For 4th place
Scotland	10
Norway	1

=== Playoffs ===
Semifinals
1	Canada	7
4	Scotland	3
2	Switzerland	6
3	Denmark	5

Gold Medal Game
1	Canada	6
2	Switzerland	4
Bronze Medal Game
4	Scotland	2
3	Denmark	5

==== Gold medal final ====
Team	1	2	3	4	5	6	7	8	9	10	Final
Switzerland (Amstutz)	0	0	2	0	0	0	1	0	1	X	4
Canada (Sutton)	1	0	0	1	1	2	0	1	0	X	6

Player percentages
Canada		Switzerland	
Marla Geiger	83%	Franziska von Känel	83%
Susan Auty	81%	Stephanie Walter	70%
Judy Wood	80%	Sandra Bracher	60%
Julie Sutton	67%	Marianne Amstutz	61%
Total		Total	

==== Bronze medal final ====
Team	1	2	3	4	5	6	7	8	9	10	Final
Denmark (Bidstrup)	0	1	0	1	1	0	1	0	1	X	5
Scotland (Hutchison)	0	0	0	0	0	1	0	1	0	X	2
