= 2007 European Mixed Curling Championship =

Sports event

- Host city: Madrid, Spain
- Arena: Palacio de Hielo
- Dates: September 24–29, 2007
- Winner: Wales
- Skip: Adrian Meikle
- Third: Lesley Carol
- Second: Andrew Tanner
- Lead: Blair Hughes
- Alternate: Chris Wells
- Finalist: Denmark (Joel Ostrowski)

The 2007 European Mixed Curling Championship was held from September 24 to 29, 2007 at the Palacio de Hielo in Madrid, Spain.

Wales, skipped by Adrian Meikle, won its first title, defeating Denmark in the final.

== Teams ==
The teams are as follows:

Country	Skip	Third	Second	Lead	Alternate(s)	Curling club
Austria	Andreas Unterberger (fourth)	Claudia Toth (skip)	Florian Huber	Karina Toth	Constanze Hummelt	
Croatia	Alen Cadez	Katarina Radonic	Drazen Cutic	Marta Muzdalo		
Czech Republic	Karel Hradec	Jana Beránková	Marek Brozek	Eva Seifertová	Vaclav Port, Irena Poliková	
Denmark	Joel Ostrowski	Camilla Jensen	Søren Jensen	Mona Sylvest Nielsen		Tårnby CC
England	Alan MacDougall	Lana Watson	Andrew Reed	Suzie Law		
Estonia	Martin Lill	Ööle Janson	Jan Anderson	Kristiine Lill	Marju Velga	
Finland	Jussi Uusipaavalniemi	Anne Malmi	Petri Tsutsunen	Johanna Pyyhtia	Olavi Malmi	Hyvinkää CC
France	Thierry Mercier	Fabienne Morand	Patrick Boez	Marie-Pierre D'Espezel de Roquetaillade		
Germany	Rainer Schöpp	Andrea Schöpp	Sebastian Jacoby	Marie-Therese Rotter	Helmar Erlewein	SC Riessersee, Garmisch-Partenkirchen
Hungary	Péter Sárdi	Agnes Patonai	Tamás Szabad	Orsolya Kazacsay	Gyula Pomázi, Írisz Tatorján	
Ireland	Johnjo Kenny	Marie O'Kane	Tony Tierney	Mary Kerr		
Italy	Antonio Menardi	Rosa Pompanin	Fabio Alverà	Claudia Alverà	Massimo Antonelli, Giorgia Casagrande	
Latvia	Kārlis Smilga	Ieva Stauere	Jānis Klīve	Maija Prozoroviča	Zanda Bikše	
Lithuania	Virginija Paulauskaitė	Vygantas Zalieckas	Evelina Alekseijenko	Paulius Kamarauskas	Piotras Gerasimovicius	
Netherlands	Rob Vilain (fourth)	Shari Leibbrandt-Demmon (skip)	Marlijn Muller	Laurens van der Windt	Cecilia van Dorp, Mark Neeleman	
Norway	Jan Marcus Lilledal	Anne Grethe Hewitt	Jan Øivind Hewitt	Anne Christine Berg	Marianne Kielland, Glenn Johansen	
Poland	Rafal Janowski	Malgorzata Janowska	Wojciech Ratajczak	Katarzyna Ratajczak	Tomasz Wolkow, Krystyna Beniger	
Russia	Alexander Kirikov	Daria Kozlova	Alexey Kamnev	Julia Svetova	Vadim Shkolnikov, Ekaterina Antonova	
Scotland	Gordon Muirhead	Eve Muirhead	Glen Muirhead	Anna Sloan		
Slovakia	Pavel Kocián	Barbora Vojtusova	Pavol Pitoňák	Zuzana Axamitová	Ronald Krcmar, Vladimira Pitoňáková	
Spain	Antonio De Mollinedo Gonzalez	Ellen Kittelsen	José Manuel Sangüesa Anzano	Ana Arce		
Sweden	Anders Kraupp	Åsa Häggman	Magnus Nilsson	Linda Kjerr		Stocksunds CK, Stockholm
Switzerland	Jacques Greiner	Jacqueline Greiner	Daniel Gallati	Fabienne Fürbringer	Emilie Matille, Stefan Karnusian	
Wales	Adrian Meikle	Lesley Carol	Andrew Tanner	Blair Hughes	Chris Wells	

== Round Robin ==
In every group: two best teams to playoffs.

=== Group A ===
Place	Team	1	2	3	4	5	6	Wins	Losses
1	Scotland	*	4:3	6:4	6:5	3:6	9:3	4	1
2	England	3:4	*	7:6	4:7	9:5	8:2	3	2
3	Czech Republic	4:6	6:7	*	8:5	5:4	10:1	3	2
4	France	5:6	7:4	5:8	*	6:5	3:10	2	3
5	Norway	6:3	5:9	4:5	5:6	*	6:5	2	3
6	Latvia	3:9	2:8	1:10	10:3	5:6	*	1	4

Team to playoffs
Teams to tie-break for 2nd place

==== Tie-break ====
Sheet A	1	2	3	4	5	6	7	8	Final
Czech Republic	0	1	3	0	1	0	0	0	5
England	1	0	0	1	0	1	1	0	4

=== Group B ===
Place	Team	1	2	3	4	5	6	Wins	Losses
1	Germany	*	8:3	8:2	5:4	10:2	4:3	5	0
2	Austria	3:8	*	6:4	5:7	8:5	7:4	3	2
3	Slovakia	2:8	4:6	*	9:4	8:4	7:3	3	2
4	Italy	4:5	7:5	4:9	*	9:4	10:4	3	2
5	Lithuania	2:10	5:8	4:8	4:9	*	7:5	1	4
6	Ireland	3:4	4:7	3:7	4:10	5:7	*	0	5

Team to playoffs
Teams to tie-break for 2nd place

==== Tie-break ====
Winner of Round 2 to playoffs

Round 1

Sheet C	1	2	3	4	5	6	7	8	Final
Slovakia	1	0	2	0	0	1	0	2	6
Italy	0	1	0	2	2	0	0	0	5

Round 2

Sheet D	1	2	3	4	5	6	7	8	Final
Austria	2	0	3	0	3	2	X	X	10
Slovakia	0	1	0	2	0	0	X	X	3

=== Group C ===
Place	Team	1	2	3	4	5	6	Wins	Losses
1	Russia	*	7:3	9:3	8:0	11:3	10:4	5	0
2	Finland	3:7	*	5:4	3:8	9:4	6:2	3	2
3	Wales	3:9	4:5	*	7:6	12:2	10:6	3	2
4	Hungary	0:8	8:3	6:7	*	6:3	8:2	3	2
5	Poland	3:11	4:9	2:12	3:6	*	8:5	1	4
6	Croatia	4:10	2:6	6:10	2:8	5:8	*	0	5

Team to playoffs
Teams to tie-break for 2nd place

==== Tie-break ====
Winner of Round 2 to playoffs

Round 1

Sheet E	1	2	3	4	5	6	7	8	9	Final
Hungary	1	0	0	1	0	1	2	0	1	6
Finland	0	1	1	0	2	0	0	1	0	5

Round 2

Sheet B	1	2	3	4	5	6	7	8	9	Final
Hungary	0	0	0	2	2	0	0	1	0	5
Wales	0	2	1	0	0	1	1	0	1	6

=== Group D ===
Place	Team	1	2	3	4	5	6	Wins	Losses
1	Denmark	*	5:8	5:7	8:5	6:5	6:2	3	2
2	Estonia	8:5	*	8:4	4:5	6:2	5:7	3	2
3	Switzerland	7:5	4:8	*	4:8	5:4	11:2	3	2
4	Sweden	5:8	5:4	8:4	*	1:5	8:3	3	2
5	Netherlands	5:6	2:6	4:5	5:1	*	9:2	2	3
6	Spain	2:6	7:5	2:11	3:8	2:9	*	1	3

Teams to tie-break for 1st place
Teams to tie-break for 2nd place

==== Tie-break ====
For 1st place

Sheet E	1	2	3	4	5	6	7	8	Final
Sweden	0	2	1	0	0	0	1	0	4
Denmark	1	0	0	1	1	1	0	3	7

For 2nd place

Sheet F	1	2	3	4	5	6	7	8	Final
Switzerland	2	0	0	0	1	0	1	0	4
Estonia	0	0	0	2	0	2	0	1	5

== Playoffs ==
Quarterfinals
D-1	Denmark	5
A-1	Scotland	3
B-2	Austria	8
C-1	Russia	7
B-1	Germany	5
A-2	Czech Republic	4
C-2	Wales	5
D-2	Estonia	4

Semifinals
Denmark	9
Austria	3
Germany	4
Wales	7

Final
Denmark	5
Wales	6
Third place
Austria	3
Germany	5

=== Quarterfinals ===
September 28, 19:00

Sheet A	1	2	3	4	5	6	7	8	Final
Denmark	2	1	0	1	0	1	2	1	8
Scotland	0	0	3	0	2	0	0	0	5

Sheet C	1	2	3	4	5	6	7	8	Final
Russia	0	0	1	0	1	0	1	0	3
Austria	0	2	0	1	0	1	0	1	5

Sheet D	1	2	3	4	5	6	7	8	Final
Germany	0	0	0	3	1	0	1	0	5
Czech Republic	0	1	0	0	0	2	0	1	4

Sheet E	1	2	3	4	5	6	7	8	Final
Wales	0	0	0	2	2	1	0	0	5
Estonia	0	0	2	0	0	0	1	1	4

=== Semifinals ===
September 29, 10:00

Sheet C	1	2	3	4	5	6	7	8	Final
Denmark	4	0	1	0	4	0	X	X	9
Austria	0	1	0	1	0	1	X	X	3

Sheet D	1	2	3	4	5	6	7	8	Final
Germany	1	0	0	0	0	3	0	X	4
Wales	0	0	1	1	2	0	3	X	7

=== Bronze medal game ===
September 29, 14:00

Sheet E	1	2	3	4	5	6	7	8	Final
Austria	0	2	0	0	0	1	0	X	3
Germany	1	0	1	1	2	0	0	X	5

=== Final ===
September 29, 14:00

Sheet D	1	2	3	4	5	6	7	8	Final
Denmark	0	1	0	1	0	2	1	0	5
Wales	1	0	2	0	1	0	0	2	6

== Final standings ==
Place	Team	Games	Wins	Losses
1st place, gold medalist(s)	Wales	9	7	2
2nd place, silver medalist(s)	Denmark	9	6	3
3rd place, bronze medalist(s)	Germany	8	7	1
4	Austria	9	5	4
5	Russia	6	5	1
6	Scotland	6	4	2
7	Czech Republic	7	4	3
8	Estonia	7	4	3
9	Italy	6	3	3
10	Finland	6	3	3
11	England	6	3	3
12	Slovakia	7	4	3
13	Switzerland	6	3	3
14	Hungary	7	4	3
15	Sweden	6	3	3
16	Norway	5	2	3
17	Netherlands	5	2	3
18	France	5	2	3
19	Lithuania	5	1	4
20	Latvia	5	1	4
21	Spain	5	1	4
22	Poland	5	1	4
23	Ireland	5	0	5
24	Croatia	5	0	5

2007 European Mixed Curling Championship
(Wales)
Wales
1st title
