= Lake Auronzo =

Artificial lake in Veneto, Italy

Lago di Auronzo
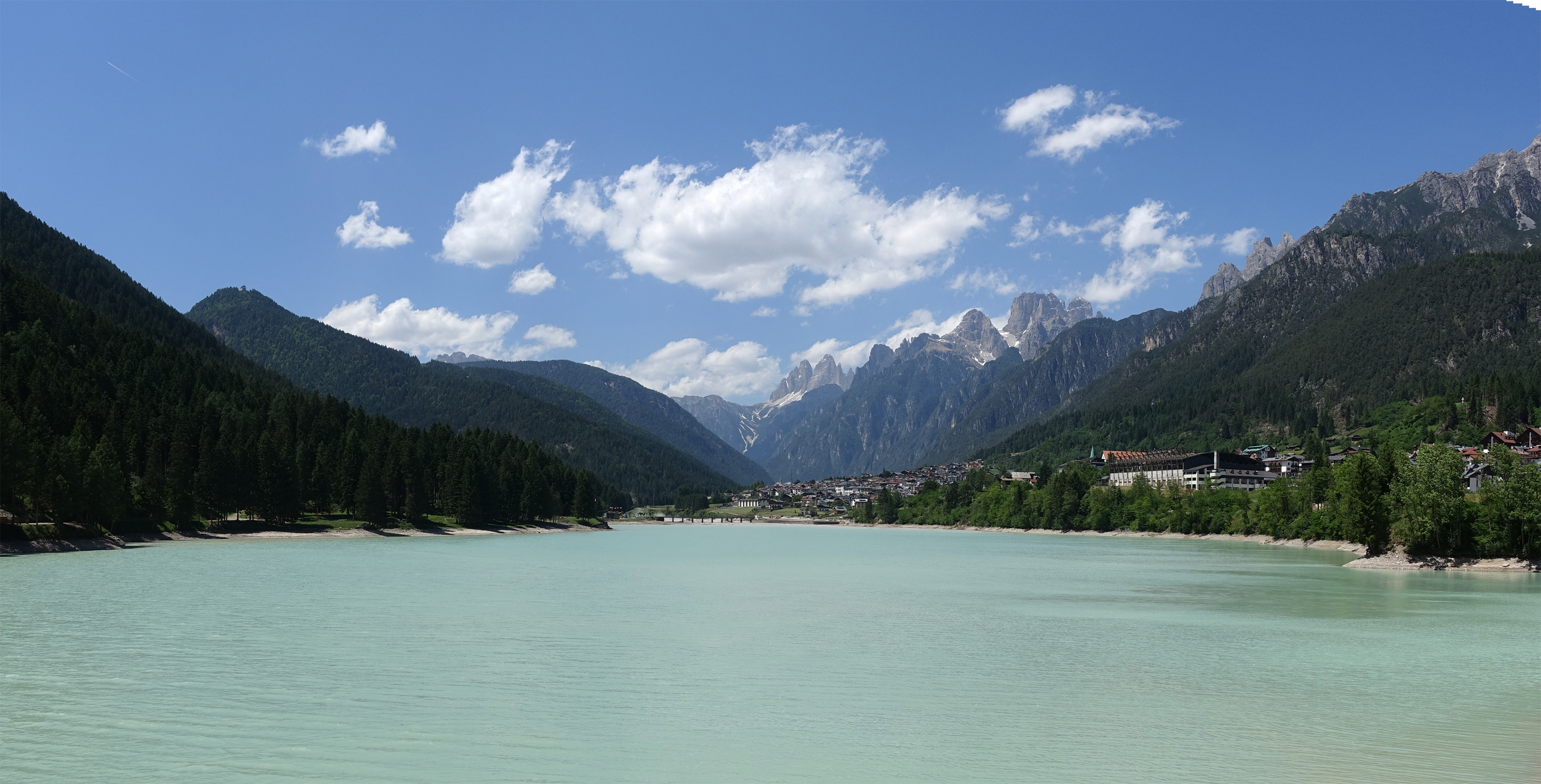
- The Lago di Auronzo
- Interactive map of Lago di Auronzo
- Location: Auronzo di Cadore, Province of Belluno, Veneto, Italy
- Coordinates: 46°32′38.35″N 12°27′02.85″E
- Type: Artificial
- Primary inflows: Ansiei
- Primary outflows: Ansiei

Lago di Auronzo, also known as Lake Santa Caterina, is an artificial lake located near the municipality of Auronzo di Cadore in the Dolomites of the Province of Belluno.

== Technical data ==
- Surface area: 0.49 km^{2} (0.19 sq mi)
- Catchment area: 225 km^{2} (87 sq mi)
- Elevation at maximum regulation: 826.21 m (2,710.7 ft) above sea level
- Elevation at maximum capacity: 830 m (2,720 ft) above sea level
- Maximum catchment elevation: 3,221 m (10,568 ft) above sea level
- Maximum depth: 49.1 m (161 ft)
- Volume: 6.25 million cubic meters

== History ==
In 1930, the SFIAC, Società forze idrauliche dell'Alto Cadore of Alessandro Marco Barnabò began construction of the dam to block the course of the Ansiei river, creating a basin about 2 kilometers long, capable of holding 6,250,000 cubic meters of water.

The project and construction management of the dam were carried out by engineer Gino Visentini Scarzanella, with the collaboration of Gaudenzio Fantoli.

The dam itself is 55 m (180 ft) high, 35 m (115 ft) thick at the base, and 5.5 m (18 ft) at its crest. The works were completed in January 1932. The SFIAC was acquired by the SADE in 1932, nationalized by Enel in 1962.

The name "Santa Caterina" comes from the fact that the dam ends where a small chapel from around 1500, dedicated to the saint, is located. The lake used to host the Cadore Motorboat Grand Prix races, while today it hosts canoe-kayak championships.
