= Mary Kerr =

Bondager and domestic servant

Mary King n. Kerr
- Born: December 12, 1905; Bellshill
- Died: May 25, 1998 (aged 92); Edinburgh
- Known for: Bondager in early 20th century Scotland

Mary King n. Kerr (12 December 1905 to 25 May 1998) was a bondager and domestic servant who was born in Bellshill and died in Edinburgh, Scotland. She was one of the very few Scottish bondagers whose life has been recorded in depth.

== Biography ==
Mary Kerr was born out of wedlock to Isabella Paxton, a domestic servant, and Andrew Kerr, a ploughman. Her parents got married soon afterwards. Being the eldest of eight children, she left school at 13 years old and started to work as a domestic helper while her father moved the family from farm to farm working in the Scottish Borders.

Then at Temple Hall Farm, in Reston, King became a bondager to her father as he was first ploughman. The very physical work involved planting and digging potatoes and turnips, mucking out the cow barn, repairing sacks, loading, driving a cart and more.

For six years, Mary Kerr needed to work the same hours as the male fieldworkers (12 hours per day at least and 6 days per week) but with every penny of the wages handed to her father and not her.

At 19 years old, she left her family and started to work as a kitchen maid. By the age of 23, Mary Kerr married a woodcutter and initially had to give up her job. Later, she would combine childrearing with working in the fields part-time.

Looking back on her life, King recalled:

‘Ah didnae sign any papers, nothing like that . . .

Ah wid jist be telt, “Ye’re gaun tae work oot.”

And that wis that’...

Ah think the fields wis hard, awfy [awfully] hard work,

and gey [very] often in a’ [all] weathers.'

== Family life ==
The couple had four children. However, one died in infancy.

== Bondagers in Scotland ==
In the 19th century, Borders area of Scotland and Northumberland in England, large numbers of rural women and girls were made to work as 'bondagers'. What this system of work meant was that, in order to secure a contract (or bond) of employment with a farmer, a married ploughman would need another person willing to work long hours in the fields, normally a woman (his wife, his daughter or, if he had neither, this meant employing a complete stranger). This feudal system was unpopular with the 'hinds' (the ploughmen) as they were expected to provide bed and board, clean clothes and pay for the woman when they would often only have one room for their entire family to live in.

Bondagers were farmworkers expected to work in the fields and the bondage system was meant to ensure there were enough fieldworkers in order to get all the necessary farming tasks completed over the course of the year.

One distinctive aspect of life as a bondager was the costume that they wore as a work uniform. This included extravagant hats and often very colourful skirts and wraps.
