= 2008 European Curling Championships =

Coordinates: 63°17′25″N 18°43′00″E

2008 Le Gruyère European Curling Championships
- Host city: Örnsköldsvik, Sweden
- Arena: Swedbank Arena
- Dates: 6-13 December, 2008
- Men's winner: Scotland
- Curling club: Curl Aberdeen, Aberdeen, Scotland
- Skip: David Murdoch
- Third: Ewan MacDonald
- Second: Peter Smith
- Lead: Euan Byers
- Alternate: Graeme Connal
- Finalist: Norway (Thomas Ulsrud)
- Women's winner: Switzerland
- Curling club: Davos CC, Davos, Switzerland
- Skip: Mirjam Ott
- Third: Carmen Schäfer
- Second: Valeria Spälty
- Lead: Janine Greiner
- Alternate: Carmen Küng
- Finalist: Sweden (Anette Norberg)

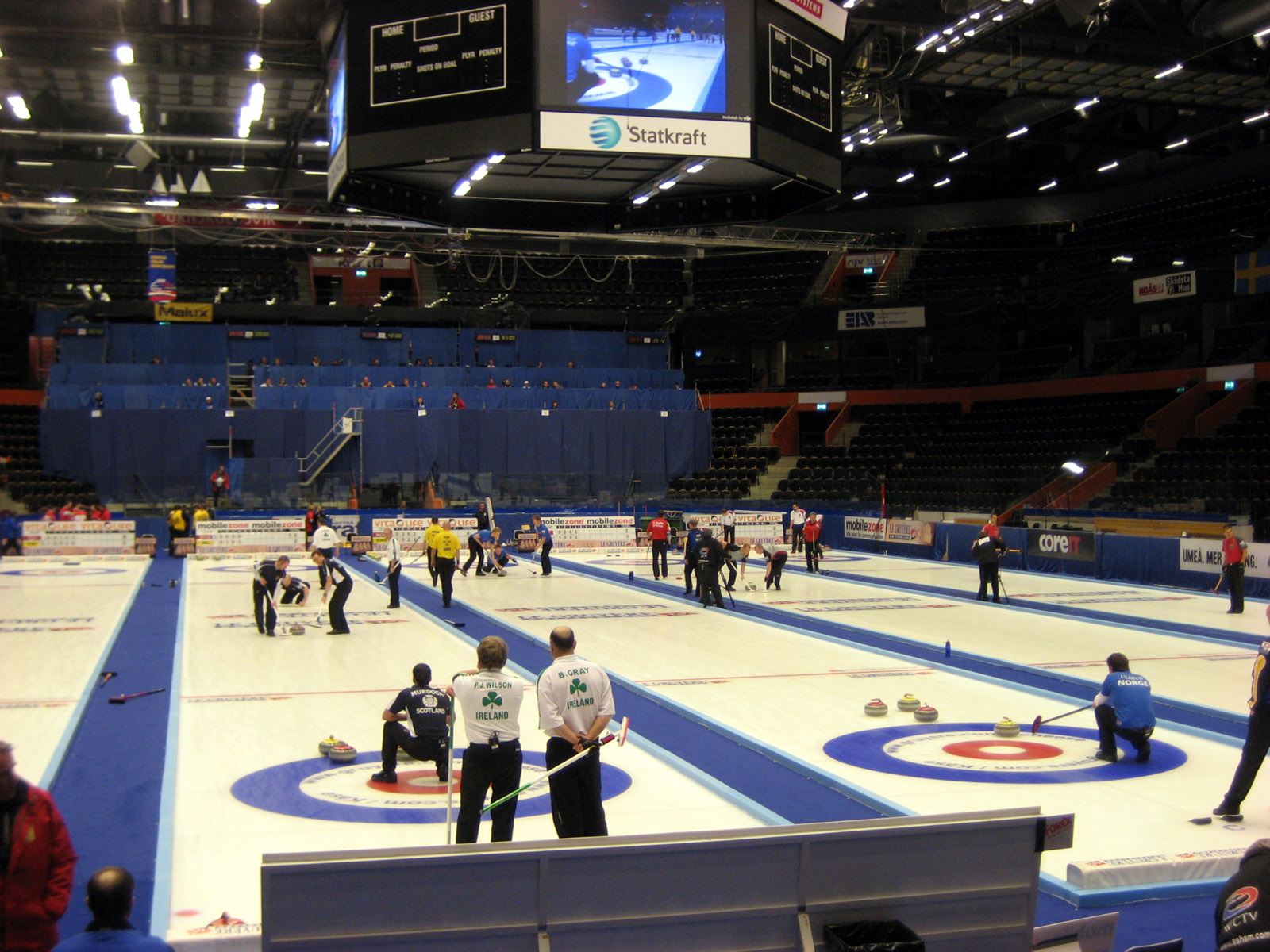
Men's competitions, Draw 9

The 2008 Le Gruyère European Curling Championships were held at Swedbank Arena in Örnsköldsvik, Sweden December 6–13, 2008. In a rematch of the men's A-Group final from the 2007 European Curling Championships, David Murdoch led Scotland to a second straight gold medal over Norway's Thomas Ulsrud 7–6 in an extra end. On the women's side, Switzerland's Mirjam Ott defeated home-country favorite Anette Norberg of Sweden 5–4.

A total of 51 teams from 29 European countries competed.

== Men's Teams ==
=== Group A ===
Nation	Skip	Third	Second	Lead	Alternate
Czech Republic	Jiri Snitil	Jindrich Kitzberger	Martin Snitil	Marek Vydra	Karel Uher
Denmark	Ulrik Schmidt	Johnny Frederiksen	Bo Jensen	Lars Vilandt	Mikkel Poulsen
France	Thomas Dufour	Tony Angiboust	Jan Ducroz	Raphael Mathieu	Richard Ducroz
Germany	Andy Kapp	Andreas Lang	Uli Kapp	Holger Höhne	Andreas Kempf
Ireland	Peter J.D. Wilson	Bill Gray	Neil Fyfe	John Furey	David Smith
Norway	Thomas Ulsrud	Torger Nergård	Christoffer Svae	Håvard Vad Petersson	Thomas Due
Scotland	David Murdoch	Ewan MacDonald	Peter Smith	Euan Byers	Graeme Connal
Spain	Antonio de Mollinedo	Martin Rios	José Manuel Sangüesa	Angel Garcia	
Sweden	Henrik Edlund	Mathias Mabergs*	Emil Marklund	David Kallin	Andreas Prytz
Switzerland	Stefan Karnusian	Christof Schwaller	Robert Hurlimann	Rolf Iseli	Andreas Schwaller

*Mabergs skips and throws third rocks; Edlund throws skip rocks

Country	G	W	L
Germany	9	7	2
Norway	9	7	2
Scotland	9	7	2
Switzerland	9	6	3
Denmark	9	5	4
Czech Republic	9	4	5
France	9	4	5
Sweden	9	3	6
Ireland	9	1	8
Spain	9	1	8

Ireland and Spain drop to the B-Group

==== Results ====
All times local

===== Draw 1 Saturday December 6, 08:00 =====
Sheet A	1	2	3	4	5	6	7	8	9	10	Final
Scotland (Murdoch)	0	0	2	0	0	0	1	0	0	0	3
Germany (Kapp)	0	0	0	0	2	0	0	2	1	1	6

Sheet B	1	2	3	4	5	6	7	8	9	10	Final
Switzerland (Karnusian)	0	1	1	1	0	1	0	0	4	X	8
Sweden (Mabergs)	0	0	0	0	2	0	0	2	0	X	4

Sheet C	1	2	3	4	5	6	7	8	9	10	Final
Denmark (Schmidt)	1	1	1	4	0	2	4	X	X	X	13
Spain (de Mollinedo)	0	0	0	0	1	0	0	X	X	X	1

Sheet D	1	2	3	4	5	6	7	8	9	10	11	Final
Ireland (Wilson)	0	0	3	0	0	0	1	1	0	0	1	6
France (Dufour)	2	0	0	2	0	0	0	0	0	1	0	5

Sheet E	1	2	3	4	5	6	7	8	9	10	Final
Norway (Ulsrud)	0	1	2	1	1	0	4	X	X	X	9
Czech Republic (Snitil)	0	0	0	0	0	1	0	X	X	X	1

===== Draw 2 Saturday December 6, 16:00 =====
Sheet A	1	2	3	4	5	6	7	8	9	10	Final
Ireland (Wilson)	0	0	0	1	0	3	0	1	0	X	5
Switzerland (Karnusian)	1	1	3	0	2	0	1	0	2	X	10

Sheet B	1	2	3	4	5	6	7	8	9	10	Final
Scotland (Murdoch)	5	2	1	0	3	2	X	X	X	X	13
Spain (de Mollinedo)	0	0	0	1	0	0	X	X	X	X	1

Sheet C	1	2	3	4	5	6	7	8	9	10	Final
Germany (Kapp)	0	2	3	0	3	0	0	1	2	1	12
Norway (Ulsrud)	1	0	0	4	0	3	0	0	0	0	8

Sheet D	1	2	3	4	5	6	7	8	9	10	Final
Denmark (Schmidt)	0	0	2	1	5	0	2	X	X	X	10
Czech Republic (Snitil)	1	1	0	0	0	1	0	X	X	X	3

Sheet E	1	2	3	4	5	6	7	8	9	10	Final
France (Dufour)	0	0	1	0	3	0	4	0	X	X	8
Sweden (Mabergs)	0	0	0	1	0	1	0	1	X	X	3

===== Draw 3 Sunday December 7, 09:00 =====
Sheet A	1	2	3	4	5	6	7	8	9	10	Final
Sweden (Mabergs)	0	2	0	1	0	0	0	2	2	1	8
Denmark (Schmidt)	1	0	1	0	1	0	3	0	0	0	6

Sheet B	1	2	3	4	5	6	7	8	9	10	Final
Norway (Ulsrud)	2	1	0	1	1	1	0	1	3	X	10
France (Dufour)	0	0	2	0	0	0	1	0	0	X	3

Sheet C	1	2	3	4	5	6	7	8	9	10	Final
Czech Republic (Snitil)	0	0	0	0	0	0	X	X	X	X	0
Scotland (Murdoch)	2	0	0	2	2	3	X	X	X	X	9

Sheet D	1	2	3	4	5	6	7	8	9	10	Final
Switzerland (Karnusian)	1	1	0	3	0	3	0	X	X	X	8
Germany (Kapp)	0	0	1	0	1	0	1	X	X	X	3

Sheet E	1	2	3	4	5	6	7	8	9	10	Final
Spain (de Mollinedo)	0	0	1	1	0	1	0	0	4	X	7
Ireland (Wilson)	0	1	0	0	1	0	1	1	0	X	4

===== Draw 4 Sunday December 7, 19:00 =====
Sheet A	1	2	3	4	5	6	7	8	9	10	Final
Norway (Ulsrud)	2	0	0	0	0	1	0	2	0	1	6
Scotland (Murdoch)	0	1	1	1	0	0	1	0	1	0	5

Sheet B	1	2	3	4	5	6	7	8	9	10	11	Final
Denmark (Schmidt)	0	1	0	1	0	3	0	2	0	0	0	7
Switzerland (Karnusian)	1	0	1	0	1	0	1	0	2	1	1	8

Sheet C	1	2	3	4	5	6	7	8	9	10	Final
Sweden (Mabergs)	0	2	0	1	1	0	3	0	3	X	10
Ireland (Wilson)	1	0	1	0	0	1	0	1	0	X	4

Sheet D	1	2	3	4	5	6	7	8	9	10	Final
France (Dufour)	2	0	2	0	0	0	2	0	1	3	10
Spain (de Mollinedo)	0	2	0	0	2	1	0	0	0	0	5

Sheet E	1	2	3	4	5	6	7	8	9	10	Final
Czech Republic (Snitil)	0	2	0	1	0	1	0	0	X	X	4
Germany (Kapp)	2	0	3	0	1	0	2	1	X	X	9

===== Draw 5 Monday December 8, 12:00 =====
Sheet A	1	2	3	4	5	6	7	8	9	10	Final
Czech Republic (Snitil)	0	1	0	0	1	1	0	2	1	X	6
Ireland (Wilson)	0	0	0	2	0	0	1	0	0	X	3

Sheet B	1	2	3	4	5	6	7	8	9	10	Final
Spain (de Mollinedo)	0	2	0	1	0	0	1	0	X	X	4
Germany (Kapp)	2	0	4	0	1	2	0	2	X	X	11

Sheet C	1	2	3	4	5	6	7	8	9	10	Final
France (Dufour)	0	2	0	3	0	2	0	2	1	X	10
Switzerland (Karnusian)	0	0	2	0	3	0	2	0	0	X	7

Sheet D	1	2	3	4	5	6	7	8	9	10	Final
Sweden (Mabergs)	0	0	2	0	0	1	0	1	X	X	4
Scotland (Murdoch)	0	3	0	2	2	0	1	0	X	X	8

Sheet E	1	2	3	4	5	6	7	8	9	10	Final
Denmark (Schmidt)	0	0	0	1	0	0	3	0	0	X	4
Norway (Ulsrud)	2	0	1	0	0	3	0	2	1	X	9

===== Draw 6 Monday December 8, 20:00 =====
Sheet A	1	2	3	4	5	6	7	8	9	10	Final
Denmark (Schmidt)	0	0	0	0	1	0	2	0	0	3	6
France (Dufour)	0	0	0	0	0	1	0	1	1	0	3

Sheet B	1	2	3	4	5	6	7	8	9	10	Final
Sweden (Mabergs)	0	0	0	1	0	1	0	2	0	X	4
Czech Republic (Snitil)	0	0	2	0	3	0	2	0	2	X	9

Sheet C	1	2	3	4	5	6	7	8	9	10	Final
Ireland (Wilson)	0	0	1	0	1	0	1	0	X	X	3
Germany (Kapp)	3	1	0	3	0	2	0	1	X	X	10

Sheet D	1	2	3	4	5	6	7	8	9	10	Final
Spain (de Mollinedo)	0	2	0	0	2	0	1	0	0	0	5
Norway (Ulsrud)	1	0	0	2	0	2	0	0	0	1	6

Sheet E	1	2	3	4	5	6	7	8	9	10	Final
Scotland (Murdoch)	1	0	1	1	0	1	0	2	0	0	6
Switzerland (Karnusian)	0	1	0	0	1	0	1	0	1	1	5

===== Draw 7 Tuesday December 9, 14:00 =====
Sheet A	1	2	3	4	5	6	7	8	9	10	Final
Spain (de Mollinedo)	0	1	0	0	0	0	X	X	X	X	1
Sweden (Mabergs)	2	0	2	0	0	4	X	X	X	X	8

Sheet B	1	2	3	4	5	6	7	8	9	10	Final
Ireland (Wilson)	2	0	0	1	0	1	0	0	X	X	4
Norway (Ulsrud)	0	3	1	0	4	0	0	1	X	X	9

Sheet C	1	2	3	4	5	6	7	8	9	10	Final
Scotland (Murdoch)	3	1	0	0	1	1	0	0	0	1	7
Denmark (Schmidt)	0	0	1	1	0	0	0	0	2	0	4

Sheet D	1	2	3	4	5	6	7	8	9	10	11	Final
Czech Republic (Snitil)	0	0	1	0	0	4	0	0	2	0	1	8
Switzerland (Karnusian)	2	0	0	0	1	0	0	2	0	2	0	7

Sheet E	1	2	3	4	5	6	7	8	9	10	Final
Germany (Kapp)	0	0	0	1	0	1	0	2	0	1	5
France (Dufour)	0	0	1	0	1	0	1	0	1	0	4

===== Draw 8 Wednesday December 10, 09:00 =====
Sheet A	1	2	3	4	5	6	7	8	9	10	Final
Switzerland (Karnusian)	0	0	3	0	1	0	0	3	0	X	7
Norway (Ulsrud)	0	1	0	2	0	0	0	0	1	X	4

Sheet B	1	2	3	4	5	6	7	8	9	10	Final
France (Dufour)	0	0	1	0	2	0	2	0	0	0	5
Scotland (Murdoch)	0	0	0	1	0	1	0	0	2	2	6

Sheet C	1	2	3	4	5	6	7	8	9	10	Final
Spain (de Mollinedo)	0	0	1	0	0	0	1	0	X	X	2
Czech Republic (Snitil)	1	0	0	1	2	2	0	3	X	X	9

Sheet D	1	2	3	4	5	6	7	8	9	10	Final
Germany (Kapp)	0	2	2	2	0	4	X	X	X	X	10
Sweden (Mabergs)	0	0	0	0	2	0	X	X	X	X	2

Sheet E	1	2	3	4	5	6	7	8	9	10	Final
Ireland (Wilson)	1	1	1	0	1	0	0	1	0	X	5
Denmark (Schmidt)	0	0	0	3	0	3	1	0	4	X	11

===== Draw 9 Wednesday December 10, 18:30 =====
Sheet A	1	2	3	4	5	6	7	8	9	10	Final
France (Dufour)	0	0	2	0	0	0	0	0	1	1	4
Czech Republic (Snitil)	0	0	0	2	0	0	0	1	0	0	3

Sheet B	1	2	3	4	5	6	7	8	9	10	Final
Germany (Kapp)	0	2	0	0	1	1	0	1	0	X	5
Denmark (Schmidt)	1	0	0	2	0	0	2	0	2	X	7

Sheet C	1	2	3	4	5	6	7	8	9	10	Final
Norway (Ulsrud)	0	2	0	2	1	0	1	1	0	0	7
Sweden (Mabergs)	1	0	2	0	0	0	0	0	2	1	6

Sheet D	1	2	3	4	5	6	7	8	9	10	Final
Scotland (Murdoch)	5	0	5	0	2	1	X	X	X	X	13
Ireland (Wilson)	0	1	0	1	0	0	X	X	X	X	2

Sheet E	1	2	3	4	5	6	7	8	9	10	Final
Switzerland (Karnusian)	0	6	1	0	2	0	5	X	X	X	14
Spain (de Mollinedo)	1	0	0	2	0	1	0	X	X	X	4

==== Playoffs ====
Page playoff system
1	Norway	9
2	Germany	7
3	Scotland	6
4	Switzerland	2

Semifinal
2	Germany	2
3	Scotland	7

Final
1	Norway	6
3	Scotland	7

===== 1 vs. 2 game =====
Thursday, December 11, 20:00

Team	1	2	3	4	5	6	7	8	9	10	Final
Norway (Ulsrud)	1	0	0	2	0	2	0	3	0	1	9
Germany (Kapp)	0	2	2	0	0	0	2	0	1	0	7

===== 3 vs. 4 game =====
Thursday, December 11, 20:00

Team	1	2	3	4	5	6	7	8	9	10	Final
Switzerland (Karnusian)	0	0	1	0	0	0	0	1	X	X	2
Scotland (Murdoch)	2	0	0	0	0	2	2	0	X	X	6

===== Semifinal =====
Friday, December 12, 14:00

Team	1	2	3	4	5	6	7	8	9	10	Final
Germany (Kapp)	0	0	0	0	2	0	0	0	X	X	2
Scotland (Murdoch)	0	2	0	0	0	3	1	1	X	X	7

===== Gold Medal Final =====
Saturday, December 13, 11:00

Team	1	2	3	4	5	6	7	8	9	10	11	Final
Norway (Ulsrud)	2	1	0	1	0	1	0	0	1	0	0	6
Scotland (Murdoch)	0	0	2	0	1	0	1	0	0	2	1	7

=== Group B1 ===
Nation	Skip	Third	Second	Lead	Alternate
Austria	Alois Kreidl	Stefan Salinger	Hubert Gründhammer	Florian Lintner	Max Ehammer
Belarus	Yauhen Puchkou	Dmitry Yarko	Ihar Mishaniov	Dmitry Kirillov	Yauheni Fedchun
England	Andrew Reed	James Dixon	Thomas Jaeggi	Andrew Dixon	John M. L. Brown
Estonia	Erkki Lill	Harri Lill	Jaanus Lindre	Indrek Ernits	Tanel Telliskivi
Finland	Kalle Kiiskinen	Jani Sullanmaa	Teemu Salo	Jari Rouvinen	Juha Pekaristo
Lithuania	Andrius Jurkonis	Arturas Smaliukas	Piotras Gerasimovici	Dalius Grakavinas	Vygantas Zalieckas
Netherlands	Rob Vilain	Brian Doucet	Miles Maclure	Erik Dijkstra	Laurens Van Der Windt
Poland	Krzysztof Kowalski	Wojciech Woyda	Przemysław Stachura	Bartosz Klimas	Tomasz Korolko
Russia	Andrey Drozdov	Alexey Stukalsky	Artem Bolduzev	Alexey Kamnev	Roman Kutuzov

==== Results ====
Country	G	W	L
Finland	8	8	0
Netherlands	8	7	1
Russia	8	6	2
Poland	8	5	3
England	8	4	4
Estonia	8	3	5
Austria	8	2	6
Lithuania	8	1	7
Belarus	8	0	8

All times local

Draw 1 Saturday December 6, 08:00

- Austria 12, Belarus 3
- England 8, Estonia 5
- Lithuania 1, Finland 7
- Poland 6, Netherlands 8

Draw 2 Saturday December 6, 16:00

- Russia 5, Netherlands 8
- Lithuania 2, Poland 11
- Belarus 1, Estonia 14
- England 3, Finland 7

Draw 3 Sunday December 7, 08:00

- Belarus 2, Finland 12
- Estonia 2, Netherlands 7
- Austria 9, Poland 11
- Lithuania 2, Russia 14

Draw 4 Sunday December 7, 16:00

- England 4, Poland 7
- Austria 11, Lithuania 3
- Estonia 3, Russia 8
- Belarus 1, Netherlands 16

Draw 5 Monday December 8, 12:00

- Estonia 8, Austria 5
- Russia 13, Belarus 3
- England 9, Lithuania 5
- Finland 10, Poland 3

Draw 6 Monday December 8, 20:00

- Netherlands 8, Lithuania 5
- Austria 1, England 9
- Poland 7, Estonia 6
- Finland 9, Russia 3

Draw 7 Tuesday December 9, 08:00

- Poland 4, Russia 9
- Finland 9, Austria 7
- Lithuania 12, Belarus 2
- Netherlands 7, England 4

Draw 8 Tuesday December 9, 20:00

- Finland 10, Estonia 2
- Russia 10, England 3
- Netherlands 8, Austria 1
- Poland 14, Belarus 6

Draw 9 Wednesday December 10, 16:00

- Netherlands 2, Finland 5
- Russia 8, Austria 6
- Belarus 6, England 13
- Estonia 8, Lithuania 2

=== Group B2 ===
Nation	Skip	Third	Second	Lead	Alternate
Belgium	Thomas Suter	Marc Suter	Walter Verbüken	Dirk Heylen	Peter Suter
Bulgaria	Lubomir Velinov	Stoil Georgiev	Tihomir Todorov	Ilian Kirilov	Nickolay Runtov
Croatia	Alen Cadez	Dalibor Golec	Drazen Cutic	Ognjen Golubic	Davor Palcec
Greece	Nikolaos Zacharias	Athanassios Pantios	Georgios Arampatzis	Dimitrios Kolonas	Nicolas Sarris
Hungary	György Nagy	Zsombor Rokusfalvy	Balazs Nemeth	Zoltan Jakab	Krisztian Barna
Italy	Stefano Ferronato	Carlo Alessandro Zisa	Gian Paolo Zandegiacomo	Marco Mariani	Giorgio Darin
Latvia	Ritvars Gulbis	Ainars Gulbis	Aivars Avotins	Normunds Sarsuns	
Slovakia	Pavol Pitonak	Frantisek Pitonak	Tomas Pitonak	Peter Pitonak	Stefan Turna
Wales	Jamie Meikle	Stuart Hills	Andrew Tanner	James Pougher	Richard Pougher

==== Results ====
Country	G	W	L
Italy	8	8	0
Hungary	8	7	1
Wales	8	5	3
Belgium	8	5	3
Latvia	8	4	4
Slovakia	8	3	5
Bulgaria	8	2	6
Croatia	8	2	6
Greece	8	0	8

All times local

Draw 1 Saturday December 6, 08:00

- Slovakia 7, Wales 6

Draw 2 Saturday December 6, 12:00

- Belgium 8, Bulgaria 3
- Croatia 9, Greece 7
- Hungary 5, Italy 6

Draw 3 Saturday December 6, 20:00

- Slovakia 3, Croatia 8
- Italy 8, Wales 3
- Belgium 9, Latvia 6
- Hungary 9, Bulgaria 4

Draw 4 Sunday December 7, 08:00

- Italy 12, Belgium 4
- Hungary 6, Croatia 5

Draw 5 Sunday December 7, 12:00

- Bulgaria 3, Latvia 6
- Greece 4, Slovakia 8

Draw 6 Sunday December 7, 20:00

- Bulgaria 8, Greece 5
- Hungary 8, Belgium 4
- Croatia 7, Wales 9
- Latvia 6, Italy 9

Draw 7 Monday December 8, 08:00

- Hungary 10, Slovakia 6
- Greece 1, Italy 11
- Croatia 5, Latvia 7
- Wales 7, Belgium 4

Draw 8 Monday December 8, 16:00

- Wales 8, Latvia 6
- Italy 7, Croatia 2
- Greece 1, Hungary 9
- Bulgaria 2, Slovakia 8

Draw 9 Tuesday December 9, 16:00

- Croatia 4, Belgium 8
- Latvia 12, Greece 1
- Wales 10, Bulgaria 7
- Slovakia 1, Italy 12

Draw 10 Wednesday December 10, 08:00

- Wales 2, Hungary 8
- Latvia 9, Slovakia 2
- Bulgaria 8, Croatia 6
- Belgium 7, Greece 3

Draw 11 Wednesday December 10, 20:00

- Latvia 3, Hungary 8
- Slovakia 5, Belgium 7
- Wales 13, Greece 8
- Italy 6, Bulgaria 2

=== Group B Playoffs ===
Page playoff system
1	Finland	8
2	Italy	3
3	Netherlands	8
4	Hungary	9

Semifinal
2	Italy	6
4	Hungary	4

Final
1	Finland	9
2	Italy	2

Finland and Italy advance to the A-Group

=== World Challenge Games ===
Friday, December 12, 20:00

- Sweden 5, Finland 6

Saturday, December 13, 09:00

- Sweden 6, Finland 1

Saturday, December 13, 14:00

- Finland 7, Sweden 5

== Women's Teams ==
=== Group A ===
Nation	Skip	Third	Second	Lead	Alternate
Czech Republic	Kateřina Urbanová	Lenka Černovská	Jana Šafaříková	Dana Chabičovská	Zuzana Hájková
Denmark	Madeleine Dupont	Denise Dupont	Angelina Jensen*	Camilla Jensen	Ane Hansen
England	Kirsty Balfour	Caroline Reed	Claire Greenwood	Sarah McVey	Suzie Law
Germany	Andrea Schöpp	Monika Wagner	Melanie Robillard	Stella Heiss	Christina Haller
Italy	Diana Gaspari	Giorgia Appolonio	Violetta Caldart	Elettra de Col	Lucrezia Salvai
Netherlands	Shari Leibbrandt-Demmon	Margrietha Voskuilen	Ester Romijn	Idske de Jong	Marianne Neeleman
Russia	Ludmila Privivkova	Olga Jarkova	Nkeiruka Ezekh	Ekaterina Galkina	Margarita Fomina
Scotland	Kelly Wood	Jackie Lockhart	Lorna Vevers	Lindsay Wood	Eve Muirhead
Sweden	Anette Norberg	Eva Lund	Cathrine Lindahl	Anna Svärd	Kajsa Bergström
Switzerland	Mirjam Ott	Carmen Schäfer	Valeria Spälty	Janine Greiner	Carmen Küng

*Jensen skips and throws second rocks; D. Dupont throws third rocks and M. Dupont throws skip rocks

Country	G	W	L
Switzerland	9	7	2
Sweden	9	7	2
Denmark	9	6	3
Germany	9	6	3
Italy	9	5	4
Scotland	9	5	4
Russia	9	4	5
England	9	2	7
Netherlands	9	2	7
Czech Republic	9	1	8

Netherlands and Czech Republic drop to the B-Group

==== Results ====
All times local

Draw 1 Saturday December 6, 12:00

Sheet A	1	2	3	4	5	6	7	8	9	10	Final
Sweden (Norberg)	0	1	1	0	2	0	4	X	X	X	8
Denmark (Jensen)	1	0	0	1	0	0	0	X	X	X	2

Sheet B	1	2	3	4	5	6	7	8	9	10	Final
Russia (Privivkova)	0	1	0	1	0	0	3	2	0	1	8
Italy (Gaspari)	2	0	3	0	0	1	0	0	1	0	7

Sheet C	1	2	3	4	5	6	7	8	9	10	Final
Czech Republic (Urbanova)	0	0	1	0	0	0	0	2	0	X	3
Scotland (Wood)	1	1	0	0	1	0	4	0	3	X	10

Sheet D	1	2	3	4	5	6	7	8	9	10	11	Final
Switzerland (Ott)	1	0	1	1	0	0	1	0	1	1	0	6
Germany (Schöpp)	0	1	0	0	2	1	0	2	0	0	1	7

Sheet E	1	2	3	4	5	6	7	8	9	10	Final
England (Balfour)	0	0	0	0	3	0	1	0	1	1	6
Netherlands (Leibbrandt-Demmon)	1	1	2	1	0	1	0	1	0	0	7

Draw 2 Saturday December 6, 20:00

Sheet A	1	2	3	4	5	6	7	8	9	10	Final
Russia (Privivkova)	0	1	0	0	2	0	1	0	0	0	4
Scotland (Wood)	2	0	1	2	0	1	0	0	1	2	9

Sheet B	1	2	3	4	5	6	7	8	9	10	Final
Denmark (Jensen)	0	1	2	0	0	0	1	1	0	X	5
Switzerland (Ott)	2	0	0	3	1	2	0	0	2	X	10

Sheet C	1	2	3	4	5	6	7	8	9	10	Final
Sweden (Norberg)	2	1	2	5	0	0	2	X	X	X	12
Netherlands (Leibbrandt-Demmon)	0	0	0	0	1	1	0	X	X	X	2

Sheet D	1	2	3	4	5	6	7	8	9	10	Final
Italy (Gaspari)	2	1	0	2	0	0	2	0	2	0	9
England (Balfour)	0	0	1	0	1	1	0	2	0	1	6

Sheet E	1	2	3	4	5	6	7	8	9	10	Final
Czech Republic (Urbanova)	0	0	1	0	1	0	1	0	0	0	3
Germany (Schöpp)	0	1	0	1	0	3	0	1	1	0	7

Draw 3 Sunday December 7, 14:00

Sheet A	1	2	3	4	5	6	7	8	9	10	Final
Czech Republic (Urbanova)	0	1	0	2	0	2	0	1	0	0	6
Netherlands (Leibbrandt-Demmon)	1	0	1	0	1	0	1	0	2	1	7

Sheet B	1	2	3	4	5	6	7	8	9	10	Final
England (Balfour)	1	0	2	0	0	0	0	2	1	2	8
Germany (Schöpp)	0	2	0	0	0	0	1	0	0	0	3

Sheet C	1	2	3	4	5	6	7	8	9	10	Final
Italy (Gaspari)	1	0	0	1	0	1	0	2	0	2	7
Switzerland (Ott)	0	0	1	0	1	0	1	0	1	0	4

Sheet D	1	2	3	4	5	6	7	8	9	10	11	Final
Sweden (Norberg)	2	0	0	2	0	1	0	0	2	1	1	9
Scotland (Wood)	0	2	1	0	1	0	0	4	0	0	0	8

Sheet E	1	2	3	4	5	6	7	8	9	10	Final
Denmark (Jensen)	4	0	0	0	0	4	0	X	X	X	8
Russia (Privivkova)	0	0	1	0	0	0	0	X	X	X	1

Draw 4 Monday December 8, 08:00

Sheet A	1	2	3	4	5	6	7	8	9	10	Final
Denmark (Jensen)	0	2	1	0	0	0	1	0	1	1	6
Italy (Gaspari)	1	0	0	0	1	1	0	2	0	0	5

Sheet B	1	2	3	4	5	6	7	8	9	10	Final
Sweden (Norberg)	1	0	0	2	1	0	0	2	0	X	6
Czech Republic (Urbanova)	0	1	0	0	0	0	1	0	1	X	3

Sheet C	1	2	3	4	5	6	7	8	9	10	Final
Netherlands (Leibbrandt-Demmon)	0	0	0	1	0	1	0	0	0	1	3
Germany (Schöpp)	1	0	1	0	2	0	0	0	2	0	6

Sheet D	1	2	3	4	5	6	7	8	9	10	Final
England (Balfour)	1	0	1	0	0	0	0	0	X	X	2
Russia (Privivkova)	0	1	0	2	0	2	1	3	X	X	9

Sheet E	1	2	3	4	5	6	7	8	9	10	Final
Scotland (Wood)	0	0	0	0	1	0	2	1	0	0	4
Switzerland (Ott)	0	0	2	1	0	2	0	0	1	1	7

Draw 5 Monday December 8, 16:00

Sheet A	1	2	3	4	5	6	7	8	9	10	Final
England (Balfour)	0	0	0	1	0	0	X	X	X	X	1
Sweden (Norberg)	4	0	2	0	2	2	X	X	X	X	10

Sheet B	1	2	3	4	5	6	7	8	9	10	Final
Netherlands (Leibbrandt-Demmon)	3	0	1	0	1	0	1	0	0	0	6
Russia (Privivkova)	0	2	0	2	0	1	0	1	1	2	9

Sheet C	1	2	3	4	5	6	7	8	9	10	Final
Scotland (Wood)	0	0	0	2	2	1	1	0	3	X	9
Denmark (Jensen)	2	1	1	0	0	0	0	1	0	X	5

Sheet D	1	2	3	4	5	6	7	8	9	10	Final
Czech Republic (Urbanova)	1	0	1	0	0	1	0	0	0	0	3
Switzerland (Ott)	0	0	0	0	1	0	1	1	1	1	5

Sheet E	1	2	3	4	5	6	7	8	9	10	Final
Germany (Schöpp)	2	0	0	1	0	1	0	0	1	0	5
Italy (Gaspari)	0	1	1	0	1	0	1	1	0	1	6

Draw 6 Tuesday December 9, 09:00

Sheet A	1	2	3	4	5	6	7	8	9	10	Final
Switzerland (Ott)	0	1	0	3	0	1	0	1	0	3	9
Russia (Privivkova)	0	0	2	0	1	0	1	0	0	0	4

Sheet B	1	2	3	4	5	6	7	8	9	10	Final
Italy (Gaspari)	2	0	0	0	0	3	0	0	0	4	9
Scotland (Wood)	0	2	2	1	1	0	1	0	0	0	7

Sheet C	1	2	3	4	5	6	7	8	9	10	Final
England (Balfour)	0	0	2	0	0	4	0	0	2	X	8
Czech Republic (Urbanova)	0	0	0	0	0	0	1	2	0		3

Sheet D	1	2	3	4	5	6	7	8	9	10	Final
Germany (Schöpp)	3	0	1	0	5	4	X	X	X	X	13
Sweden (Norberg)	0	2	0	2	0	0	X	X	X	X	4

Sheet E	1	2	3	4	5	6	7	8	9	10	Final
Netherlands (Leibbrandt-Demmon)	0	1	0	1	0	0	0	0	1	0	3
Denmark (Jensen)	1	0	3	0	0	0	0	1	0	2	7

Draw 7 Tuesday December 9, 18:30

Sheet A	1	2	3	4	5	6	7	8	9	10	Final
Italy (Gaspari)	0	1	0	0	1	1	0	0	2	2	7
Czech Republic (Urbanova)	0	0	0	3	0	0	1	4	0	0	8

Sheet B	1	2	3	4	5	6	7	8	9	10	11	Final
Germany (Schöpp)	0	0	1	0	2	1	0	1	0	1	0	6
Denmark (Jensen)	1	0	0	2	0	0	1	0	2	0	1	7

Sheet C	1	2	3	4	5	6	7	8	9	10	Final
Russia (Privivkova)	0	0	1	0	2	1	1	0	0	0	5
Sweden (Norberg)	1	1	0	2	0	0	0	2	1	1	8

Sheet D	1	2	3	4	5	6	7	8	9	10	Final
Scotland (Wood)	2	2	2	0	0	1	0	3	X	X	10
Netherlands (Leibbrandt-Demmon)	0	0	0	1	1	0	1	0	X	X	3

Sheet E	1	2	3	4	5	6	7	8	9	10	Final
Switzerland (Ott)	3	0	0	3	3	3	X	X	X	X	12
England (Balfour)	0	1	0	0	0	0	X	X	X	X	1

Draw 8 Wednesday December 10, 14:00

Sheet A	1	2	3	4	5	6	7	8	9	10	Final
Scotland (Wood)	0	2	0	1	0	1	0	0	2	0	6
Germany (Schöpp)	3	0	0	0	1	0	2	0	0	3	9

Sheet B	1	2	3	4	5	6	7	8	9	10	Final
Switzerland (Ott)	0	1	0	1	0	0	0	2	3	X	7
Sweden (Norberg)	0	0	2	0	0	1	1	0	0	X	4

Sheet C	1	2	3	4	5	6	7	8	9	10	Final
Denmark (Jensen)	0	0	1	1	0	3	0	1	0	1	7
England (Balfour)	1	0	0	0	1	0	1	0	2	0	5

Sheet D	1	2	3	4	5	6	7	8	9	10	Final
Netherlands (Leibbrandt-Demmon)	0	1	0	2	0	1	0	0	1	X	5
Italy (Gaspari)	1	0	1	0	1	0	2	2	0	X	7

Sheet E	1	2	3	4	5	6	7	8	9	10	11	Final
Russia (Privivkova)	2	0	0	3	0	2	0	0	2	0	1	10
Czech Republic (Urbanova)	0	2	1	0	1	0	1	0	0	4	0	9

Draw 9 Thursday December 11, 08:00

Sheet A	1	2	3	4	5	6	7	8	9	10	Final
Netherlands (Leibbrandt-Demmon)	0	1	0	1	0	0	1	0	0	X	3
Switzerland (Ott)	1	0	1	0	0	5	0	0	1	X	8

Sheet B	1	2	3	4	5	6	7	8	9	10	Final
Scotland (Wood)	1	0	2	1	0	3	0	0	2	X	9
England (Balfour)	0	1	0	0	0	0	0	3	0	X	4

Sheet C	1	2	3	4	5	6	7	8	9	10	Final
Germany (Schöpp)	0	2	0	0	0	1	0	2	0	1	6
Russia (Privivkova)	0	0	1	0	0	0	2	0	1	0	4

Sheet D	1	2	3	4	5	6	7	8	9	10	11	Final
Denmark (Jensen)	0	0	1	1	1	1	0	0	0	0	1	5
Czech Republic (Urbanova)	1	0	0	0	0	0	2	0	0	1	0	4

Sheet E	1	2	3	4	5	6	7	8	9	10	Final
Italy (Gaspari)	0	1	0	0	1	0	0	X	X	X	2
Sweden (Norberg)	2	0	3	1	0	1	2	X	X	X	9

Tiebreaker Thursday December 11, 15:00

Sheet C	1	2	3	4	5	6	7	8	9	10	Final
Netherlands (Leibbrandt-Demmon)	0	0	0	2	0	1	2	0	1	0	6
England (Balfour)	1	1	2	0	1	0	0	1	0	1	7

==== Playoffs ====
Page playoff system
1	Switzerland	8
2	Sweden	4
3	Denmark	8
4	Germany	7

Semifinal
2	Sweden	8
3	Denmark	7

Final
1	Switzerland	5
2	Sweden	4

===== 1 vs. 2 game =====
Thursday, December 11, 20:00

Team	1	2	3	4	5	6	7	8	9	10	Final
Sweden (Norberg)	0	0	0	1	0	2	1	0	0	0	4
Switzerland (Ott)	0	0	2	0	1	0	0	2	1	2	8

===== 3 vs. 4 game =====
Thursday, December 11, 20:00

Team	1	2	3	4	5	6	7	8	9	10	11	Final
Denmark (Jensen)	1	0	1	0	3	0	0	1	1	0	1	8
Germany (Schöpp)	0	2	0	2	0	2	0	0	0	1	0	7

===== Semifinal =====
Friday, December 12, 19:00

Team	1	2	3	4	5	6	7	8	9	10	Final
Sweden (Norberg)	2	0	0	1	0	0	1	0	4	0	8
Denmark (Jensen)	0	2	0	0	2	1	0	1	0	1	7

===== Gold Medal Final =====
Saturday, December 13, 15:00

Team	1	2	3	4	5	6	7	8	9	10	Final
Sweden (Norberg)	0	1	0	1	1	0	0	1	0	0	4
Switzerland (Ott)	2	0	1	0	0	1	0	0	0	1	5

=== Group B1 ===
Nation	Skip	Third	Second	Lead	Alternate
Austria	Karina Toth	Constanze Hummelt	Jasmin Seidl	Alexandra Bruckmiller	Verena Hagenbuchner
Croatia	Katarina Radonic	Nikolina Petric	Marta Muzdalo	Zrinka Muhek	Slavica Roso
Hungary	Ildiko Szekeres	Alexandra Beres	Gyöngyi Nagy	Boglárka Ádám	
Latvia	Iveta Staša-Šaršūne	Ieva Krusta	Una Grava-Germane	Zanda Bikše	Dace Munča
Norway	Marianne Rorvik	Henriette Løvar	Ingrid Stensrud	Kristin Skaslien	Kristin Løvseth

==== Results ====
Country	G	W	L
Norway	4	4	0
Hungary	4	3	1
Latvia	4	2	2
Austria	4	1	3
Croatia	4	0	4

All times local

Draw 1 Saturday December 6, 12:00

- Latvia 7, Hungary 10
- Austria 8, Croatia 6

Draw 2 Sunday December 7, 16:00

- Latvia 3, Norway 6

Draw 3 Sunday December 7, 20:00

- Croatia 4, Hungary 11

Draw 4 Monday December 8, 16:00

- Hungary 9, Austria 8

Draw 5 Monday December 8, 20:00

- Croatia 5, Norway 12

Draw 6 Tuesday December 9, 12:00

- Norway 7, Austria 6
- Croatia 5, Latvia 9

Draw 7 Wednesday December 10, 12:00

- Austria 5, Latvia 7
- Norway 7, Hungary 4

=== Group B2 ===
Nation	Skip	Third	Second	Lead	Alternate
Estonia	Kristiine Lill	Ööle Janson	Katrin Kuusk	Marju Velga	
Finland	Ellen Vogt	Laura Kröger	Riikka Louhivuori	Paula Lehtomäki	Elisa Alatalo
France	Sandrine Morand	Delphine Charlet	Brigitte Mathieu	Alexandra Seimbille	Pauline Jeanneret
Poland	Marta Szeliga-Frynia	Katarzyna Wicik	Agnieszka Ogrodniczek	Marianna Das	Maria Klus
Slovakia	Barbora Vojtusova	Gabriela Kajanova	Katarina Langova	Zuzana Axamitova	Daniela Matulova
Spain	Estrella Labrador Amo	Irantzu Garcia	Sorkunde Vez Bilbao	Maria Fernandez Picado	Elena Altuna Lopez

==== Results ====
Country	G	W	L
Finland	5	4	1
Poland	5	3	2
Estonia	5	3	2
Slovakia	5	2	3
France	5	2	3
Spain	5	1	4

All times local

Draw 1 Saturday December 6, 16:00

- Spain 4, Estonia 12
- France 6, Finland 7

Draw 2 Saturday December 6, 20:00

- Slovakia 3, Poland 5

Draw 3 Sunday December 7, 12:00

- Estonia 3, Finland 7
- France 5, Poland 7
- Slovakia 8, Spain 4

Draw 4 Monday December 8, 08:00

- Finland 1, Spain 11

Draw 5 Monday December 8, 12:00

- Slovakia 9, France 1
- Estonia 6, Poland 3

Draw 6 Tuesday December 9, 12:00

- Finland 8, Slovakia 3
- Estonia 2, France 9
- Poland 9, Spain 3

Draw 7 Wednesday December 10, 12:00

- Poland 5, Finland 6
- Slovakia 4, Estonia 9
- Spain 7, France 8

Tiebreaker Wednesday December 10, 20:00

- Estonia 1, Poland 8

=== Group B Playoffs ===
Page playoff system
1	Norway	10
2	Finland	6
3	Hungary	6
4	Poland	4

Semifinal
2	Finland	7
3	Hungary	5

Final
1	Norway	9
2	Finland	3

Norway and Finland advance to the A-Group

=== World Challenge Games ===
Friday, December 12, 20:00

- Norway 10, England 1

Saturday, December 13, 09:00

- England 7, Norway 4

Saturday, December 13, 14:00

- Norway 10, England 9

== Broadcasting ==
There is news that the Swedish national television SVT will broadcast four round robin games involving Sweden and follow Sweden through the play-off rounds. The event will also be broadcast throughout Europe by Eurosport.
