= Giulia Lacedelli =

Italian curler (born 1971)

- Curler
- Born: 22 March 1971 (age 55); Cortina d'Ampezzo, Italy

Curling career
- World Championship: 6 (2003, 2004, 2005, 2006 2007)
- European Championship: 6 (1996, 1997, 1998, 1999, 2006, 2007)
- Olympic: 1 (2006)
Medal record
Curling
European Championships
Gold medal – first place	2002	B Group
Silver medal – second place	2006	A Group

Giulia Lacedelli (born 22 March 1971 in Cortina d'Ampezzo) is an Italian curler. She started playing curling in 1986 and currently plays lead on the Italian National Women's Curling Team skipped by Veronica Zappone. She competed at the 2006 Winter Olympics as the third for Diana Gaspari.
