= Violetta Caldart =

Italian curler

Medal record

Curling

European Championships
Gold medal – first place	2002	B Group
Silver medal – second place	2006	A Group
Bronze medal – third place	2001	B Group

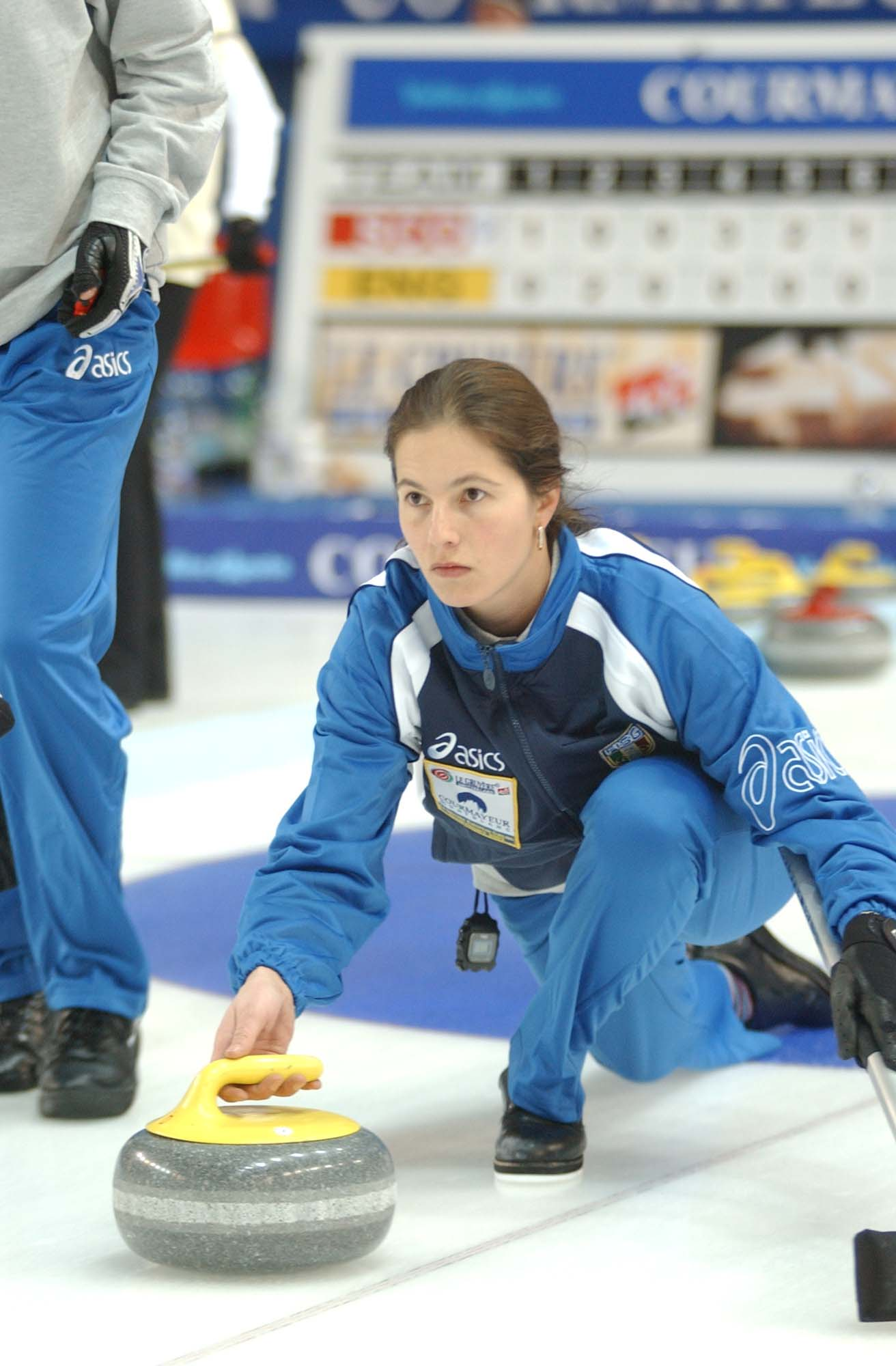
Violetta Caldart at the 2003 European Curling Championships(December 2003)in Courmayeur, Italy.

Violetta Caldart (born 10 October 1969 in Auronzo di Cadore) is an Italian curler who lives in Chur, Switzerland.

Caldart started playing curling in 1992. She plays in first position and is right-handed.

She coached the Italian team at the 2017 World Women's Curling Championship and at the 2020 World Women's Curling Championship.

== Personal life ==
Caldart is the former manager of Curling Club Dolomiti She is married and has one child.
