= Chiara Olivieri =

Italian curler

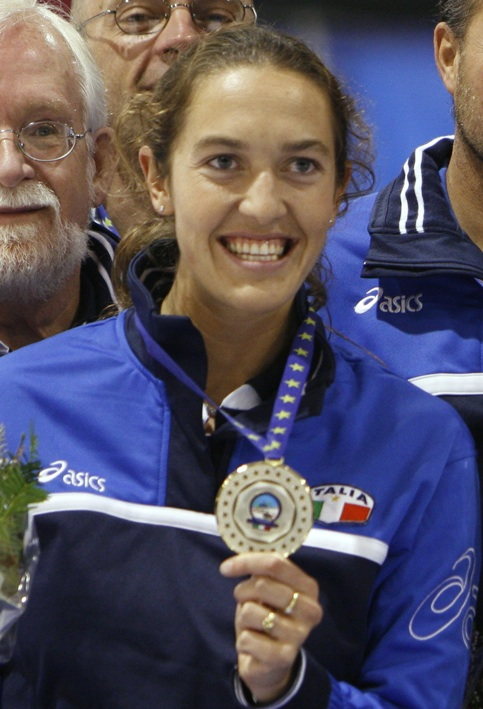
Chiara Olivieri

Chiara Olivieri (born 9 September 1979 in Negrar) is an Italian curler from Cortina d'Ampezzo. She is presently the alternate for the team skipped by Diana Gaspari.

== Career ==
Olivieri has represented Italy at 4 European Curling Championships and two World Curling Championships. Her first event as a member of the Italian women's team was the 2001 European Curling Championships, when she played lead. The team finished 11th at the event. She was demoted to the team's alternate position for the 2002 and 2003 European Championships and the 2004 World Championships. She did not play for them at the 2004 Olympics, and she left the team that season.

Olivieri returned to the Italian national team in 2011, in the second position. She played in the 2011 European Curling Championships and finished sixth. She was also a member of the team at the 2012 Ford World Women's Curling Championship.

During the time she was off the team, Olivieri played in three European Mixed Curling Championships (2006, 2010, 2011). She won a silver medal at the 2006 European Mixed, playing third for Italy, skipped by Valter Bombassei.

== Personal life ==
Olivieri is employed as an office clerk and is married.
