= Roberto Lacedelli =

Italian alpine skier (1919–1983)

Personal information
- Born: 2 June 1919 Cortina d'Ampezzo, Italy
- Died: 26 July 1983 (aged 64)

Skiing career
- Sport: Alpine skiing

Roberto Lacedelli (2 June 1919 – 26 July 1983) was an Italian alpine skier.

== Life and career ==
Born in Cortina d'Ampezzo, Lacedelli started his professional career in 1937 and competed in the slalom, ski jumping, combined and downskill specialties. During the World War II he took refuge in Switzerland, where he continued to compete using the false name Smeterlink. He competed at the 1948 Winter Olympics and the 1952 Winter Olympics, and at three FIS Alpine World Ski Championships. He was also national champion in various specialties five times. He retired in 1952, and after his retirement he worked as a ski and tennis trainer. Among the athletes he trained, there was Giuliana Minuzzo.

Lacedelli died of cerebral embolism while giving a tennis lesson on 26 July 1983, at the age of 64. His sons Renato and Aldo are both former hockey players who played for the Italian national team.
