= Claudia Alvera =

Italian curler

- Curler
- Born: July 6, 1966 (age 60); Cortina d'Ampezzo, Italy

Team
- Curling club: CC Dolomiti, Cortina d'Ampezzo

Curling career
- World Championship: 4 (2009, 2012, 2013, 2016)
- European Championship: 6 (2009, 2010, 2011, 2012, 2015, 2016)
Medal record
Curling

Claudia Alvera (born 6 July 1966) is an Italian curler.

== Personal life ==
Alvera works as a chef. She is married and has two daughters who curled with her – Giorgia and Federica Apollonio. Her brother is an Italian curler and coach Fabio Alverà.
