= Gianluca Lorenzi =

Italian politician (born 1969)

Mayor of Cortina d'Ampezzo
- Incumbent
- Assumed office 13 June 2022
- Preceded by: Gianpietro Ghedina

Personal details
- Born: 1 April 1969 (age 57) Pieve di Cadore, Italy
- Party: Vivere Cortina
- Profession: Former curler, sports manager

Gianluca Lorenzi (born 1 April 1969) is an Italian politician and former curler serving as mayor of Cortina d'Ampezzo since 2022. He oversees the town's preparations for the 2026 Winter Olympics, for which he was awarded the Gold Collar for Sports Merit in 2024.

== Early life and career ==
Lorenzi is the son of curler Ivo Lorenzi. He joined the national men's junior curling team in 1986, and held the role of vice-skip. In 1997, he joined the national men's team. He served as president of the Associazione Albergatori di Cortina from 2000 to 2006 and from 2016 to 2017, and was concurrently a board member of the Federalberghi Veneto. From 2002 to 2007, he served as assessor for tourism of Cortina d'Ampezzo. He served as municipal councillor for tourism under Gianpietro Ghedina from 2017 until his resignation in 2018. He was appointed board member of Servizi Ampezzo in 2019, and resigned from the municipal council in 2020 as a result. He remained as a board member until 2022. In the 2022 local elections, he campaigned on incumbent mayor Ghedina having lost contact with the town due to his focus on the 2026 Winter Olympics.
