= European Mixed Curling Championship =

International curling tournament

- Established: 2005
- Abolished: 2014

The European Mixed Curling Championship was a mixed curling tournament held annually in the autumn for European nations. The first tournament was held in 2005.

The European Mixed Curling Championship was replaced with a World Mixed Curling Championship, effective in the 2015–16 curling season.

== Results ==
The results are listed as follows:

Year	Location	Final			Third Place Match
Year	Location	Champion	Score	Second Place	Third Place	Score	Fourth Place
2005	(Andorra) Canillo	Finland; Markku Uusipaavalniemi; Kirsi Nykänen; Teemu Salo; Tiina Kautonen	6–4	Sweden; Niklas Edin; Stina Viktorsson; Sebastian Kraupp; Anna Viktorsson	Germany; Rainer Schöpp; Andrea Schöpp; Helmar Erlewein; Monika Wagner	7–3	Scotland; Derek Brown; Cathryn Guthrie; Greig Smith; Rhona Brown
2006	(Italy) Claut	Scotland; Tom Brewster; Jackie Lockhart; David Hay; Kim Brewster	8–4	Italy; Valter Bombassei; Chiara Olivieri; Davide Zandegiacomo; Sara Zandegiacomo; Marco Constantini; Elettra de Col	Russia; Alexander Kirikov; Daria Kozlova; Dmitri Abanin; Julia Svetova; Andrei Drosdov	5–2	Sweden; Per Noréen; Camilla Johansson; Flemming Patz; Susanne Patz
2007	(Spain) Madrid	Wales; Adrian Meikle; Lesley Carol; Andrew Tanner; Blair Hughes; Chris Wells	6–5	Denmark; Joel Ostrowski; Camilla Jensen; Søren Jensen; Mona Sylvest Nielsen	Germany; Rainer Schöpp; Andrea Schöpp; Sebastian Jacoby; Marie-Therese Rotter; Helmar Erlewein	5–3	Austria; Andreas Unterberger; Claudia Toth; Florian Huber; Karina Toth; Constanze Hummelt
2008	(Austria) Kitzbühel	Germany; Rainer Schöpp; Andrea Schöpp; Sebastian Jacoby; Melanie Robillard; Helmar Erlewein; Monika Wagner	5-3	Czech Republic; Jiří Snítil; Hana Synáčková; Martin Snítil; Karolína Pilařová; Kateřina Kobosilová	Sweden; Niklas Edin; Anna Hasselborg; Eric Carlsén; Sabina Kraupp; Sune Frederiksen	6–4	Russia; Alexander Kirikov; Yana Nekrasova; Petr Dron; Galina Arsenkina; Victor Kornev; Anna Sidorova
2009	(Czech Republic) Prague	Scotland; Tom Brewster; Lynn Cameron; Colin Campbell; Michelle Silvera; Kim Brewster	5–1	Denmark; Joel Ostrowski; Camilla Jensen; Sören Jensen; Mona Sylvest Nielsen	England; Alan MacDougall; Lana Watson; Andrew Reed; Suzi Law	5–3	Czech Republic; Jakub Bareš; Lenka Kitzbergerová; Jindřich Kitzberger; Michaela Nadherová; Jiři Snítil; Lenka Kucerová
2010	(Scotland) Howwood	Scotland; David Edwards; Kerry Barr; Dillan Perras; Louise Wood	6–2	Switzerland; Claudio Pätz; Gioia Öchsle; Sven Michel; Alina Pätz	Germany; Rainer Schöpp; Andrea Schöpp; Floria Zahler; Imogen Oona Lehmann; Adolf Geiselhart	5–4	England; Alan MacDougall; Lana Watson; Andrew Reed; Suzie Law; John Sharp
2011	(Denmark) Tårnby	Switzerland; Thomas Lips; Manuela Siegrist; Martin Rios; Manuela Netzer-Kormann	9–3	Germany; Alexander Baumann; Ann Kathrin Bastian; Manuel Walter; Katja Weisser; Sebastian Schweizer; Josephine Obermann	Czech Republic; Kryštof Chaloupek; Eliška Jalovcová; David Jirounek; Luisa Illková; Tomáš Paul	7–6	Denmark; Mikael Qvist; Mona Sylvest Nielsen; Niels Siggaard Andersen; Trine Qvist
2012	(Turkey) Erzurum	Scotland; Ewan MacDonald; Eve Muirhead; Euan Byers; Karen Barthelemy	8–4	Sweden; Rickard Hallström; Elisabeth Norredahl; Fredrik Hallström; Catrin Bitén	Finland; Aku Kauste; Sanna Puustinen; Pauli Jäämies; Oona Kauste	10–3	Austria; Karina Toth; Sebastian Wunderer; Constanze Hummelt; Mathias Genner
2013	(Scotland) Edinburgh	Germany; Andy Kapp; Petra Tschetsch; Holger Höhne; Pia-Lisa Schöll	5–4	Scotland; Ewan MacDonald; Kay Adams; Euan Byers; Karen Barthelemy	Hungary; György Nagy; Ildikó Szekeres; Zsolt Kiss; Ágnes Szentannai	6–3	Finland; Tomi Rantamäki; Anne Malmi; Pekka Peura; Tiina Suuripää
2014	(Denmark) Tårnby	Sweden; Patric Mabergs; Isabella Wranå; Johannes Patz; Sofia Mabergs	9–2	Norway; Steffen Walstad; Kristin Skaslien; Magnus Nedregotten; Julie Molnar	Switzerland; Silvana Tirinzoni; Martin Rios; Romano Meier; Jenny Perret	7–5	Scotland; Kyle Smith; Hannah Fleming; Billy Morton; Alice Spence

== All-time Medal Table ==
The all-time medal table is up-to-date as of the conclusion of the 2014 European Mixed Curling Championship.

Rank	Nation	Gold	Silver	Bronze	Total
1	Scotland	4	1	0	5
2	Germany	2	1	3	6
3	Sweden	1	2	1	4
4	Switzerland	1	1	1	3
5	Finland	1	0	1	2
6	Wales	1	0	0	1
7	Denmark	0	2	0	2
8	Czech Republic	0	1	1	2
9	Italy	0	1	0	1
9	Norway	0	1	0	1
11	England	0	0	1	1
11	Hungary	0	0	1	1
11	Russia	0	0	1	1
Totals (13 entries)		10	10	10	30

== See also ==
- World Mixed Curling Championship
- European Curling Championships
