= Elettra de Col =

Italian curler

- Curler
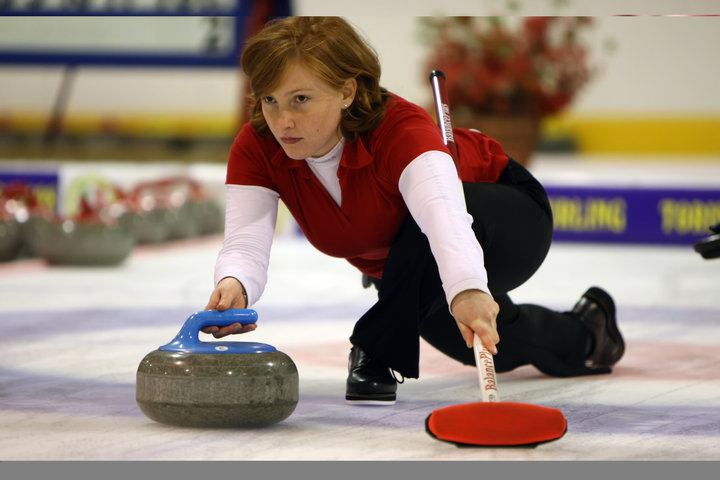
- Born: 8 December 1987 (age 38)

Curling career
- Member Association: Italy
- World Championship: 3 (2007, 2008, 2009)
- European Championship: 4 (2006, 2007, 2008, 2009)
- Other appearances: European Mixed Championship: 2 (2006, 2012), World Junior Championships: 2 (2004, 2007), Winter Universiade: 1 (2007)
Medal record
Curling
European Championships
Silver medal – second place	2006 Basel
European Mixed Championship
Silver medal – second place	2006 Claut
European Junior Challenge
Gold medal – first place	2007 Copenhagen

Elettra de Col (born 8 December 1987) is an Italian curler.

De Col started curling in 2000. She plays in second position and is right-handed.
