= Auronzo di Cadore =

- Comune
- Comune di Auronzo di Cadore
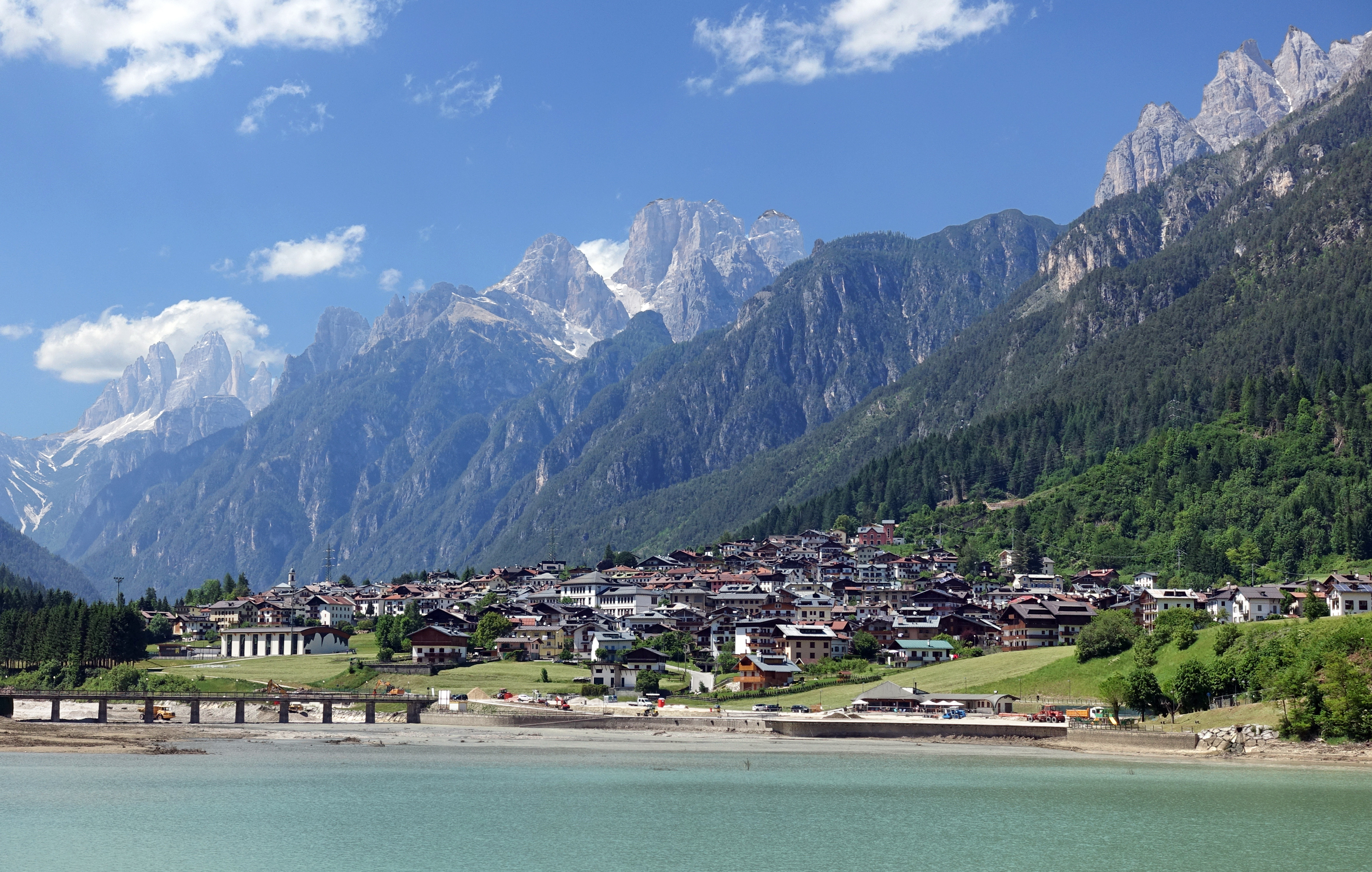

- Coat of arms

- Location of Auronzo di Cadore in Italy Auronzo di Cadore (Veneto)
- Coordinates: 46°33′N 12°26′E
- Country: Italy
- Region: Veneto
- Province: Belluno (BL)
- Frazioni: Cima Gogna, Misurina

Government
  - Mayor: Tatiana Pais Beche

Area
  - Total: 220.5 km^{2} (85.1 sq mi)
- Elevation: 862 m (2,828 ft)

Population (30 June 2017)
  - Total: 3,316
  - Density: 15.04/km^{2} (38.95/sq mi)
- Demonym: Auronzani
- Time zone: UTC+1 (CET)
  - Summer (DST): UTC+2 (CEST)
- Postal code: 32041
- Dialing code: 0435
- Patron saint: St. Justina of Padua
- Saint day: October 7
- Website: Official website

Auronzo di Cadore is a comune (municipality) in the province of Belluno (Cadore) in the Italian region of Veneto, located about 120 kilometres (75 mi) north of Venice and about 50 kilometres (31 mi) northeast of Belluno. While Auronzo is geographically only 11 kilometres (6.8 mi) from the Austrian border, it is roughly 48 kilometres (30 mi) via paved road due to the mountainous terrain.

The municipality of Auronzo di Cadore includes the mountain group of the Tre Cime di Lavaredo and Lake Misurina. The river Ansiei is dammed to make Santa Caterina Lake, which borders the town. The main road through Auronzo is route SR48.

== Twin towns / Sister cities ==
- Lipari, Italy
- Ilópolis, Brazil

== See also ==
- Lake Auronzo
- Lake Misurina
