= Italian Curling Championship =

National curling championship

This article lists the results for Italy's national curling championship held since 1955.

Year	Men		Women	
Year	Winning Club	Locale	Winning Club	Locale
1955	CC Cristallo	Cortina d'Ampezzo		
1957	CC Cristallo	Cortina d'Ampezzo		
1958	CC Miramonti	Cortina d'Ampezzo		
1959	CC Cristallo	Cortina d'Ampezzo		
1960	CC Cristallo	Cortina d'Ampezzo		
1961	CC Cristallo	Cortina d'Ampezzo		
1962	CC Cristallo	Cortina d'Ampezzo		
1963	CC Cristallo	Cortina d'Ampezzo		
1964	CC Cortina	Cortina d'Ampezzo		
1965	CC Cortina	Cortina d'Ampezzo		
1966	CC Cortina	Cortina d'Ampezzo		
1967	CC Dolomiti	Cortina d'Ampezzo		
1968	CC 66 Cortina	Cortina d'Ampezzo		
1969	CC Dolomiti	Cortina d'Ampezzo		
1970	CC Dolomiti	Cortina d'Ampezzo		
1971	CC 66 Cortina	Cortina d'Ampezzo		
1972	CC 66 Cortina	Cortina d'Ampezzo		
1973	CC 66 Cortina	Cortina d'Ampezzo		
1974	CC 66 Cortina	Cortina d'Ampezzo		
1975	CC 66 Cortina	Cortina d'Ampezzo		
1976	CC 66 Cortina	Cortina d'Ampezzo	CC Dolomiti	Cortina d'Ampezzo
1977	CC Tofane	Cortina d'Ampezzo	CC 66 Lady	Cortina d'Ampezzo
1978	CC 66 Cortina	Cortina d'Ampezzo	CC 66 Lady	Cortina d'Ampezzo
1979	CC Tofane	Cortina d'Ampezzo	CC Cortina	Cortina d'Ampezzo
1980	CC Tofane	Cortina d'Ampezzo	CC 66 Lady	Cortina d'Ampezzo
1981	CC Tofane	Cortina d'Ampezzo	CC 66 Lady	Cortina d'Ampezzo
1982	CC Tofane	Cortina d'Ampezzo	CC 66 Lady	Cortina d'Ampezzo
1983	CC Dolomiti	Cortina d'Ampezzo	CC 66 Lady	Cortina d'Ampezzo
1984	CC Tofane	Cortina d'Ampezzo	CC 66 Lady	Cortina d'Ampezzo
1985	CC Tofane	Cortina d'Ampezzo	CC 66 Lady	Cortina d'Ampezzo
1986	CC Tofane	Cortina d'Ampezzo	CC 66 Lady	Cortina d'Ampezzo
1987	CC Tofane	Cortina d'Ampezzo	CC New Wave	Cortina d'Ampezzo
1988	CC Tofane	Cortina d'Ampezzo	Not held	
1989	Not held		CC New Wave	Cortina d'Ampezzo
1990	CC Tofane	Cortina d'Ampezzo	CC 66 Lady	Cortina d'Ampezzo
1991	CC Canadà	Pieve di Cadore	CC 66 Lady	Cortina d'Ampezzo
1992	CC Tofane	Cortina d'Ampezzo	CC Auronzo	Auronzo di Cadore
1993	CC Auros	Auronzo di Cadore	CC Auronzo	Auronzo di Cadore
1994	CC Dolomiti	Cortina d'Ampezzo	CC Auronzo	Auronzo di Cadore
1995	CC Auros	Auronzo di Cadore	CC Auronzo	Auronzo di Cadore
1996	CC Auros	Auronzo di Cadore	CC Olimpia	Cortina d'Ampezzo
1997	CC Dolomiti	Cortina d'Ampezzo	CC Olimpia	Cortina d'Ampezzo
1998	CC Dolomiti	Cortina d'Ampezzo	CC Olimpia	Cortina d'Ampezzo
1999	CC Dolomiti	Cortina d'Ampezzo	CC Olimpia	Cortina d'Ampezzo
2000	CC Dolomiti	Cortina d'Ampezzo	CC Olimpia	Cortina d'Ampezzo
2001	CC Lago Santo	Cembra	CC Olimpia	Cortina d'Ampezzo
2002	CC Lago Santo	Cembra	CC New Wave	Cortina d'Ampezzo
2003	CC Dolomiti	Cortina d'Ampezzo	CC Olimpia	Cortina d'Ampezzo
2004	CC Dolomiti	Cortina d'Ampezzo	CC New Wave	Cortina d'Ampezzo
2005	CC Dolomiti	Cortina d'Ampezzo	CC New Wave	Cortina d'Ampezzo
2006	CC Dolomiti	Cortina d'Ampezzo	CC New Wave	Cortina d'Ampezzo
2007	CC Lago Santo	Cembra	CC Olimpia	Cortina d'Ampezzo
2008	CC Lago Santo	Cembra	CC Dolomiti	Cortina d'Ampezzo
2009	CC Trentino	Trento	CC Dolomiti	Cortina d'Ampezzo
2010	CC Trentino	Trento	CC Tofane	Cortina d'Ampezzo
2011	CC Trentino	Trento	CC Tofane	Cortina d'Ampezzo
2012	CC Trentino	Trento	CC Tofane	Cortina d'Ampezzo
2013	CC Trentino	Trento	Libertas Luserna	Luserna
2014	CC Trentino	Trento	Libertas Luserna	Luserna
2015	CC Trentino	Trento	CC Tofane	Cortina d'Ampezzo
2016	CC Trentino	Trento	CC Tofane	Cortina d'Ampezzo
2017	CC Trentino	Trento	CC Tofane	Cortina d'Ampezzo
2018	AC Cembra	Cembra	CC Dolomiti	Cortina d'Ampezzo
2019	SC Pinerolo	Pinerolo	CC Dolomiti	Cortina d'Ampezzo
2020	Not held			
2021	SC Pinerolo	Pinerolo	CC Dolomiti	Cortina d'Ampezzo
2022	SC Pinerolo	Pinerolo	CC Dolomiti	Cortina d'Ampezzo
2023	Trentino Curling Cembra (Joël Retornaz)	Cembra	CC Dolomiti (Stefania Constantini)	Cortina d'Ampezzo
2024	Trentino Curling Cembra (Joël Retornaz)	Cembra	SC Pinerolo (Rebecca Mariani)	Pinerolo
2025	Trentino Curling Cembra (Joël Retornaz)	Cembra	CC Dolomiti (Stefania Constantini)	Cortina d'Ampezzo
2026	ASC Curling Suedtirol Bruneck (Stefano Spiller)	Bruneck	Team Dare+ (Stefania Constantini)	Pinerolo

== See also ==
- Italian Mixed Curling Championship
- Italian Mixed Doubles Curling Championship
