= Marco Mariani (curler) =

Italian curler

Marco Mariani (born 14 June 1968, in Venice) is an Italian curler from Cortina d'Ampezzo, Belluno, Italy.

Mariani competed at the 2006 Winter Olympics inTurin, Italy, where he finished in 7th place.

He was the coach of the Chinese women's curling team and took them to 7th place at the 2022 Winter Olympics in Beijing, China.

== Personal life ==
Mariani is married and has one daughter, Rebecca.

== Awards ==
- Collie Campbell Memorial Award, 2005
