= Rodger Gustaf Schmidt =

German curler and coach

- Curler ♂
- Born: 20 June 1952 (age 74); Neudorf, Saskatchewan

Curling career
- Member Association: Saskatchewan; Germany
- Brier: 1 (1978)
- World Championship: 2 (1987, 1992)
- European Championship: 2 (1985, 1990)
Medal record
Curling
Representing Germany
World Championships
Silver medal – second place	1987 Vancouver
European Championships
Gold medal – first place	1985 Grindelwald
Representing Saskatchewan
Macdonald Brier
Silver medal – second place	1978 Vancouver

Rodger Gustaf Schmidt (born 20 June 1952) is a former Canadian–German curler and curling coach.

Schmidt was born in Neudorf, Saskatchewan and moved to Duff, Saskatchewan in his youth. He is a descendant of German immigrants, and learned to speak German from his grandparents.

In high school, Schmidt played Canadian football as a quarterback for the Melville, Saskatchewan high school team.

In 1970 he moved to Saskatoon to attend the University of Saskatchewan, and became a schoolteacher. Schmidt played for the Rick Folk rink from 1974 to 1978, and went to the 1978 Macdonald Brier, finishing in second place. He left the team after that season, moving to Lethbridge, Alberta.

Schmidt moved to Germany in 1984 when his wife got a job with the Department of National Defence.

He is a former World men's runner-up (1987), European men's curling champion (1985) and two-time German men's curling champion (1987, 1992).

Schmidt later moved to Lucerne, Switzerland. In 1994 he founded the "Rodger Schmidt Curling Academy" based there. He is also an icemaker.

His brother is former Saskatchewan politician Grant Schmidt.

== Teams ==
Season	Skip	Third	Second	Lead	Alternate	Events
1975–78	Rick Folk	Bob Thompson	Tom Wilson	Rodger Gustaf Schmidt		Brier 1978 (silver)
1985–86	Rodger Gustaf Schmidt	Wolfgang Burba	Johnny Jahr	Hans-Joachim Burba		ECC 1985 (gold); WCC CR 1985 (gold)
1986–87	Rodger Gustaf Schmidt	Wolfgang Burba	Johnny Jahr	Hans-Joachim Burba		WCC 1987 (silver)
1990–91	Rodger Gustaf Schmidt	Philip Seitz	Johnny Jahr	Andreas Feldenkirchen	Dirk Hornung, Joackim Fendske	ECC 1990 (10th)
1991–92	Rodger Gustaf Schmidt	Wolfgang Burba	Hans-Joachim Burba	Bernhard Mayr	Martin Beiser	WCC 1992 (9th)
2007–08	Christopher Bartsch	Roger Gustaf Schmidt	Peter Rickmers	Christoph Daase		

== Record as a coach of national teams ==
Year	Tournament, event	National team	Place
1990	1990 World Men's Curling Championship	Germany (men)	10
1991	1991 World Men's Curling Championship	Germany (men)	7
1999	1999 World Junior Curling Championships	Czech Republic (junior men)	7
1999	1999 European Curling Championships	Czech Republic (men)	14
1999	1999 European Curling Championships	Czech Republic (women)	12
2000	2000 World Junior Curling Championships	Czech Republic (junior men)	10
2000	2000 European Curling Championships	Italy (men)	12
2000	2000 European Curling Championships	Italy (women)	12
2001	2001 World Junior B Curling Championships	Italy (junior men)	3rd place, bronze medalist(s)
2001	2001 European Curling Championships	Italy (men)	10
2001	2001 European Curling Championships	Italy (women)	11
2002	2002 World Junior Curling Championships	Italy (junior women)	4
2002	2002 European Curling Championships	Italy (men)	11
2002	2002 European Curling Championships	Italy (women)	11
2003	2003 Winter Universiade	Italy (men)	9
2003	2003 World Junior Curling Championships	Italy (junior women)	3rd place, bronze medalist(s)
2003	2003 World Women's Curling Championship	Italy (women)	9
2003	2003 European Curling Championships	Italy (men)	8
2003	2003 European Curling Championships	Italy (women)	5
2004	2004 World Junior B Curling Championships	Italy (junior men)	2nd place, silver medalist(s)
2004	2004 World Junior Curling Championships	Italy (junior men)	7
2004	2004 World Junior Curling Championships	Italy (junior women)	9
2004	2004 European Curling Championships	Italy (men)	5
2005	2005 World Women's Curling Championship	Italy (women)	11
2005	2005 World Men's Curling Championship	Italy (men)	12
2005	2005 European Curling Championships	Italy (men)	9
2005	2005 European Curling Championships	Italy (women)	6
2006	2006 Winter Olympics	Italy (women)	10
2006	2006 World Women's Curling Championship	Italy (women)	9
2006	2006 European Curling Championships	Italy (women)	2nd place, silver medalist(s)
2007	2007 Winter Universiade	Italy (women)	5
2007	2007 World Women's Curling Championship	Italy (women)	12
2007	2007 European Curling Championships	Austria (men)	20
2008	2008 European Curling Championships	Austria (women)	17
2009	2009 European Curling Championships	Austria (men)	19
2009	2009 European Curling Championships	Austria (women)	13
2010	2010 Winter Olympics	United States (women)	10
2010	2010 European Curling Championships	Austria (men)	19
2010	2010 European Curling Championships	Austria (women)	13
2011	2011 European Mixed Curling Championship	Austria (mixed)	5
2011	2011 European Curling Championships	Austria (men)	15
2011	2011 European Curling Championships	Austria (women)	15
2012	2012 World Mixed Doubles Curling Championship	Austria (mixed doubles)	3rd place, bronze medalist(s)
2012	2012 European Curling Championships	Russia (men)	5
2014	2014 World Men's Curling Championship	Russia (men)	11
2015	2015 World Women's Curling Championship	Russia (women)	3rd place, bronze medalist(s)
2015	2015 European Curling Championships	Russia (women)	1st place, gold medalist(s)
2017	2017 European Curling Championships	Russia (women)	5
2020	2020 World Junior Curling Championships	Switzerland (men)	2nd place, silver medalist(s)
