= 2010 European Curling Championships – Women's tournament =

2010 European Curling Championships Women's tournament
- Host city: Champéry, Switzerland
- Arena: Palladium Ice Hall
- Dates: December 4–11, 2010
- Winner: Sweden
- Skip: Stina Viktorsson
- Third: Christina Bertrup
- Second: Maria Wennerström
- Lead: Margaretha Sigfridsson
- Alternate: Agnes Knochenhauer
- Finalist: Scotland

The women's tournament of the 2010 European Curling Championships took place from December 4 – 11, 2010. Winners of the Group C tournament in Howwood, Scotland will move on to the Group B tournament in Monthey. The top 6 women's teams at the 2010 ECC (aside from defending world champion Germany and host country Denmark), will represent their respective nations at the 2011 Capital One World Women's Curling Championship in Esbjerg, Denmark.

== Group A ==
=== Teams ===
Denmark	Finland	Germany	Latvia	Netherlands
Skip: Lene Nielsen; Third: Helle Simonsen; Second: Jeanne Ellegaard; Lead: Maria Poulsen; Alternate: Natacha Glenström	Skip: Ellen Vogt; Third: Riikka Louhivuori; Second: Elisa Westerberg; Lead: Tiina Suuripää; Alternate: Katja Kiiskinen	Skip: Andrea Schöpp; Third: Imogen Oona Lehmann; Second: Monika Wagner; Lead/Alternate: Stella Heiß; Lead/Alternate: Corinna Scholz	Skip: Evita Regza; Third: Dace Regza; Second: Vineta Smilga; Lead: Dace Pastare; Alternate: Anete Zabere	Fourth: Ester Romijn; Third: Linde De Wit; Second: Marianne Neeleman; Skip: Shari Leibbrandt-Demmon; Alternate: Marlijn Müller
Norway	Russia	Scotland	Sweden	Switzerland
Skip: Linn Githmark; Third: Henriette Løvar; Second: Ingrid Stensrud; Lead: Kristin Skaslien; Alternate: Marianne Rorvik	Skip: Liudmila Privivkova; Third: Anna Sidorova; Second: Margarita Fomina; Lead: Ekaterina Galkina; Alternate: Nkeiruka Ezekh	Skip: Eve Muirhead; Third: Kelly Wood; Second: Lorna Vevers; Lead: Anne Laird; Alternate: Anna Sloan	Skip: Stina Viktorsson; Third: Christina Bertrup; Second: Maria Wennerström; Lead: Margaretha Sigfridsson; Alternate: Agnes Knochenhauer	Skip: Mirjam Ott; Third: Carmen Schäfer; Second: Carmen Küng; Lead: Janine Greiner; Alternate: Irene Schori

=== Standings ===
Key
Countries to Playoffs
Countries to Tiebreakers
Countries relegated to 2011 ECC Group B

Country	Skip	W	L	PF	PA	Ends Won	Ends Lost	Blank Ends	Stolen Ends	Shot Pct.
Scotland	Eve Muirhead	8	1	68	37	37	28	12	12	80%
Russia	Liudmila Privivkova	7	2	64	41	45	25	5	20	77%
Switzerland	Mirjam Ott	7	2	65	42	38	34	11	9	79%
Sweden	Stina Viktorsson	6	3	64	49	38	34	14	6	78%
Denmark	Lene Nielsen	5	4	45	50	30	36	18	4	79%
Norway	Linn Githmark	5	4	52	48	31	33	13	9	75%
Germany	Andrea Schöpp	4	5	53	55	32	37	15	4	77%
Latvia	Evita Regza	2	7	37	71	28	39	9	4	66%
Finland	Ellen Vogt	1	8	50	71	35	40	6	6	69%
Netherlands	Shari Leibbrandt-Demmon	0	9	38	72	31	39	9	4	65%

=== Results ===
==== Draw 1 ====
Saturday, December 4, 8:00

Sheet A	1	2	3	4	5	6	7	8	9	10	Final
Finland (Vogt)	0	0	1	0	0	1	0	0	X	X	2
Russia (Privivkova)	1	0	0	1	3	0	1	3	X	X	9

Sheet B	1	2	3	4	5	6	7	8	9	10	Final
Scotland (Muirhead)	0	0	4	0	0	0	0	4	0	X	8
Germany (Schöpp)	0	1	0	1	2	0	0	0	1	X	5

Sheet C	1	2	3	4	5	6	7	8	9	10	Final
Latvia (Regza)	0	1	0	1	0	1	0	0	X	X	3
Sweden (Viktorsson)	1	0	2	0	3	0	2	2	X	X	10

Sheet D	1	2	3	4	5	6	7	8	9	10	11	Final
Denmark (Nielsen)	0	1	0	2	0	1	0	1	0	0	0	5
Switzerland (Ott)	0	0	1	0	0	0	1	0	2	1	1	6

Sheet E	1	2	3	4	5	6	7	8	9	10	Final
Norway (Githmark)	0	2	0	1	1	0	0	3	0	X	7
Netherlands (Leibbrandt-Demmon)	1	0	1	0	0	1	1	0	1	X	5

==== Draw 2 ====
Saturday, December 4, 16:00

Sheet A	1	2	3	4	5	6	7	8	9	10	Final
Norway (Githmark)	0	2	0	0	0	0	2	1	0	1	6
Scotland (Muirhead)	0	0	2	0	1	1	0	0	1	0	5

Sheet B	1	2	3	4	5	6	7	8	9	10	Final
Finland (Vogt)	2	0	0	0	1	1	0	2	0	2	8
Latvia (Regza)	0	1	2	3	0	0	1	0	2	0	9

Sheet C	1	2	3	4	5	6	7	8	9	10	Final
Germany (Schöpp)	2	0	0	2	0	1	0	4	X	X	9
Denmark (Nielsen)	0	1	0	0	1	0	1	0	X	X	3

Sheet D	1	2	3	4	5	6	7	8	9	10	11	Final
Sweden (Viktorsson)	0	0	3	0	0	0	0	0	1	0	1	5
Netherlands (Leibbrandt-Demmon)	2	0	0	0	0	0	0	1	0	1	0	4

Sheet E	1	2	3	4	5	6	7	8	9	10	Final
Russia (Privivkova)	1	0	0	3	1	1	1	0	1	X	8
Switzerland (Ott)	0	3	1	0	0	0	0	1	0	X	5

==== Draw 3 ====
Sunday, December 5, 11:00

Sheet A	1	2	3	4	5	6	7	8	9	10	Final
Germany (Schöpp)	0	3	0	2	0	2	0	2	0	2	11
Netherlands (Leibbrandt-Demmon)	1	0	1	0	2	0	2	0	2	0	8

Sheet B	1	2	3	4	5	6	7	8	9	10	Final
Norway (Githmark)	0	0	0	1	0	0	2	0	0	0	3
Denmark (Nielsen)	1	0	0	0	2	0	0	2	0	1	6

Sheet C	1	2	3	4	5	6	7	8	9	10	Final
Scotland (Muirhead)	1	0	0	2	1	0	1	0	0	1	6
Switzerland (Ott)	0	1	0	0	0	2	0	2	0	0	5

Sheet D	1	2	3	4	5	6	7	8	9	10	Final
Latvia (Regza)	0	0	0	0	2	0	0	0	0	X	2
Russia (Privivkova)	1	0	0	1	0	2	1	2	2	X	9

Sheet E	1	2	3	4	5	6	7	8	9	10	Final
Finland (Vogt)	0	1	0	2	0	0	1	1	0	2	7
Sweden (Viktorsson)	3	0	1	0	2	1	0	0	1	0	8

==== Draw 4 ====
Sunday, December 5, 20:00

Sheet A	1	2	3	4	5	6	7	8	9	10	Final
Switzerland (Ott)	0	1	0	1	1	0	2	0	3	X	8
Latvia (Regza)	1	0	1	0	0	1	0	1	0	X	4

Sheet B	1	2	3	4	5	6	7	8	9	10	Final
Sweden (Viktorsson)	0	2	0	2	0	3	0	1	0	1	9
Russia (Privivkova)	2	0	1	0	2	0	1	0	1	0	7

Sheet C	1	2	3	4	5	6	7	8	9	10	Final
Netherlands (Leibbrandt-Demmon)	0	1	0	0	0	1	1	0	0	X	3
Finland (Vogt)	1	0	0	1	1	0	0	1	2	X	6

Sheet D	1	2	3	4	5	6	7	8	9	10	Final
Germany (Schöpp)	0	0	2	0	1	0	0	0	0	0	3
Norway (Githmark)	0	0	0	1	0	1	0	0	1	1	4

Sheet E	1	2	3	4	5	6	7	8	9	10	Final
Scotland (Muirhead)	0	0	0	1	0	1	0	1	1	2	6
Denmark (Nielsen)	0	0	2	0	1	0	1	0	0	0	4

==== Draw 5 ====
Monday, December 6, 12:00

Sheet A	1	2	3	4	5	6	7	8	9	10	Final
Denmark (Nielsen)	0	3	0	2	0	1	0	1	1	0	8
Finland (Vogt)	1	0	2	0	1	0	1	0	0	1	6

Sheet B	1	2	3	4	5	6	7	8	9	10	Final
Switzerland (Ott)	0	3	0	2	1	0	2	X	X	X	8
Norway (Githmark)	0	0	1	0	0	1	0	X	X	X	2

Sheet C	1	2	3	4	5	6	7	8	9	10	Final
Russia (Privivkova)	2	0	1	2	0	1	2	1	X	X	9
Netherlands (Leibbrandt-Demmon)	0	2	0	0	1	0	0	0	X	X	3

Sheet D	1	2	3	4	5	6	7	8	9	10	Final
Scotland (Muirhead)	2	3	2	0	0	3	X	X	X	X	10
Latvia (Regza)	0	0	0	1	1	0	X	X	X	X	2

Sheet E	1	2	3	4	5	6	7	8	9	10	Final
Sweden (Viktorsson)	0	0	2	0	2	0	1	1	X	X	6
Germany (Schöpp)	0	0	0	1	0	0	0	0	X	X	1

==== Draw 6 ====
Monday, December 6, 20:00

Sheet A	1	2	3	4	5	6	7	8	9	10	Final
Netherlands (Leibbrandt-Demmon)	0	1	0	0	0	1	0	X	X	X	2
Switzerland (Ott)	2	0	3	1	1	0	3	X	X	X	10

Sheet B	1	2	3	4	5	6	7	8	9	10	Final
Denmark (Nielsen)	0	0	0	3	0	0	1	0	2	0	6
Sweden (Viktorsson)	0	0	0	0	2	0	0	2	0	1	5

Sheet C	1	2	3	4	5	6	7	8	9	10	Final
Finland (Vogt)	0	0	1	0	2	0	2	0	1	X	6
Scotland (Muirhead)	0	2	0	2	0	3	0	2	0	X	9

Sheet D	1	2	3	4	5	6	7	8	9	10	Final
Russia (Privivkova)	1	0	1	3	0	1	0	1	0	X	7
Germany (Schöpp)	0	2	0	0	1	0	1	0	1	X	5

Sheet E	1	2	3	4	5	6	7	8	9	10	Final
Latvia (Regza)	0	0	0	1	0	0	X	X	X	X	1
Norway (Githmark)	0	1	1	0	3	5	X	X	X	X	10

==== Draw 7 ====
Tuesday, December 7, 15:00

Sheet A	1	2	3	4	5	6	7	8	9	10	Final
Scotland (Muirhead)	1	0	1	1	0	2	0	1	0	1	7
Sweden (Viktorsson)	0	1	0	0	1	0	2	0	1	0	5

Sheet B	1	2	3	4	5	6	7	8	9	10	Final
Latvia (Regza)	2	0	3	0	0	2	0	1	0	X	8
Netherlands (Leibbrandt-Demmon)	0	2	0	0	1	0	1	0	1	X	5

Sheet C	1	2	3	4	5	6	7	8	9	10	11	Final
Switzerland (Ott)	0	0	1	0	0	1	0	1	1	0	3	7
Germany (Schöpp)	1	0	0	0	1	0	1	0	0	1	0	4

Sheet D	1	2	3	4	5	6	7	8	9	10	Final
Norway (Githmark)	3	1	3	0	2	0	X	X	X	X	9
Finland (Vogt)	0	0	0	2	0	1	X	X	X	X	3

Sheet E	1	2	3	4	5	6	7	8	9	10	Final
Denmark (Nielsen)	0	0	1	0	0	0	X	X	X	X	1
Russia (Privivkova)	1	1	0	1	2	2	X	X	X	X	7

==== Draw 8 ====
Wednesday, December 8, 10:00

Sheet A	1	2	3	4	5	6	7	8	9	10	Final
Latvia (Regza)	1	1	0	0	1	0	1	0	1	X	5
Germany (Schöpp)	0	0	0	3	0	3	0	1	0	X	7

Sheet B	1	2	3	4	5	6	7	8	9	10	Final
Russia (Privivkova)	0	0	0	0	1	0	X	X	X	X	1
Scotland (Muirhead)	2	0	2	1	0	4	X	X	X	X	9

Sheet C	1	2	3	4	5	6	7	8	9	10	Final
Sweden (Viktorsson)	2	0	2	2	0	2	0	2	0	X	10
Norway (Githmark)	0	1	0	0	2	0	2	0	1	X	6

Sheet D	1	2	3	4	5	6	7	8	9	10	Final
Netherlands (Leibbrandt-Demmon)	1	0	2	0	0	1	0	1	0	X	5
Denmark (Nielsen)	0	2	0	2	3	0	0	0	1	X	8

Sheet E	1	2	3	4	5	6	7	8	9	10	Final
Switzerland (Ott)	0	1	1	0	1	0	0	5	0	X	8
Finland (Vogt)	0	0	0	1	0	0	2	0	2	X	5

==== Draw 9 ====
Wednesday, December 8, 20:00

Sheet A	1	2	3	4	5	6	7	8	9	10	Final
Russia (Privivkova)	1	0	0	0	2	0	1	1	1	1	7
Norway (Githmark)	0	2	0	2	0	1	0	0	0	0	5

Sheet B	1	2	3	4	5	6	7	8	9	10	Final
Germany (Schöpp)	0	1	2	0	1	0	2	0	0	2	8
Finland (Vogt)	0	0	0	2	0	1	0	2	2	0	7

Sheet C	1	2	3	4	5	6	7	8	9	10	Final
Denmark (Nielsen)	0	0	0	2	0	0	1	0	0	1	4
Latvia (Regza)	1	0	0	0	0	1	0	0	1	0	3

Sheet D	1	2	3	4	5	6	7	8	9	10	Final
Switzerland (Ott)	0	2	0	0	0	1	0	2	0	3	8
Sweden (Viktorsson)	0	0	1	0	2	0	1	0	2	0	6

Sheet E	1	2	3	4	5	6	7	8	9	10	Final
Netherlands (Leibbrandt-Demmon)	0	0	1	1	0	0	1	X	X	X	3
Scotland (Muirhead)	3	4	0	0	1	0	0	X	X	X	8

==== World Challenge ====
===== Challenge 1 =====
Friday, December 10, 20:00

Sheet E	1	2	3	4	5	6	7	8	9	10	Final
Latvia (Regza)	1	0	0	0	1	0	1	0	1	X	4
Czech Republic (Kubeskova)	0	1	2	1	0	1	0	2	0	X	7

===== Challenge 2 =====
Saturday, December 11, 09:30

Sheet E	1	2	3	4	5	6	7	8	9	10	Final
Latvia (Regza)	1	0	1	0	2	0	0	1	0	3	8
Czech Republic (Kubeskova)	0	2	0	1	0	1	0	0	2	0	6

===== Challenge 3 =====
Saturday, December 11, 13:00

Sheet E	1	2	3	4	5	6	7	8	9	10	Final
Latvia (Regza)	0	0	1	0	2	1	0	2	X	X	6
Czech Republic (Kubeskova)	3	3	0	3	0	0	1	0	X	X	10

=== Playoffs ===
Page playoff system
1	Scotland	9
2	Russia	4
3	Switzerland	3
4	Sweden	5

Semifinal
2	Russia	5
4	Sweden	7

Gold-medal game
1	Scotland	6
4	Sweden	8

Bronze-medal game
2	Russia	5
3	Switzerland	9

==== 1 vs. 2 ====
Thursday, December 9, 20:00

Sheet D	1	2	3	4	5	6	7	8	9	10	Final
Scotland (Muirhead)	0	2	0	0	2	1	0	0	4	X	9
Russia (Privivkova)	1	0	0	1	0	0	1	1	0	X	4

Player percentages
Scotland		Russia	
Anne Laird	79%	Ekaterina Galkina	79%
Lorna Vevers	79%	Margarita Fomina	85%
Kelly Wood	76%	Anna Sidorova	74%
Eve Muirhead	83%	Liudmila Privivkova	74%
Total	79%	Total	78%

==== 3 vs. 4 ====
Thursday, December 9, 20:00

Sheet A	1	2	3	4	5	6	7	8	9	10	Final
Switzerland (Ott)	0	1	0	1	0	0	0	0	1	0	3
Sweden (Viktorsson)	0	0	1	0	0	2	0	0	0	2	5

Player percentages
Switzerland		Sweden	
Janine Greiner	84%	Margaretha Sigfridsson	81%
Carmen Küng	78%	Maria Wennerström	76%
Carmen Schäfer	76%	Christina Bertrup	73%
Mirjam Ott	63%	Stina Viktorsson	72%
Total	76%	Total	76%

==== Semifinal ====
Friday, December 10, 20:00

Sheet B	1	2	3	4	5	6	7	8	9	10	Final
Russia (Privivkova)	0	2	0	1	0	0	1	1	0	X	5
Sweden (Viktorsson)	1	0	1	0	2	2	0	0	1	X	7

Player percentages
Russia		Sweden	
Ekaterina Galkina	84%	Margaretha Sigfridsson	69%
Margarita Fomina	83%	Maria Wennerström	80%
Anna Sidorova	86%	Christina Bertrup	84%
Liudmila Privivkova	66%	Stina Viktorsson	84%
Total	80%	Total	79%

==== Bronze-medal game ====
Saturday, December 11, 8:00

Sheet D	1	2	3	4	5	6	7	8	9	10	Final
Russia (Privivkova)	2	0	0	1	0	0	1	0	1	X	5
Switzerland (Ott)	0	0	2	0	4	1	0	2	0	X	9

Player percentages
Russia		Switzerland	
Ekaterina Galkina	81%	Carmen Küng	84%
Margarita Fomina	78%	Irene Schori	71%
Anna Sidorova	58%	Carmen Schäfer	75%
Liudmila Privivkova	61%	Mirjam Ott	83%
Total	69%	Total	78%

==== Gold-medal game ====
Saturday, December 11, 12:00

Sheet C	1	2	3	4	5	6	7	8	9	10	Final
Scotland (Muirhead)	2	0	1	0	0	0	2	1	0	0	6
Sweden (Viktorsson)	0	2	0	0	2	1	0	0	2	1	8

Player percentages
Scotland		Sweden	
Anne Laird	80%	Margaretha Sigfridsson	80%
Lorna Vevers	70%	Maria Wennerström	76%
Kelly Wood	81%	Christina Bertrup	91%
Eve Muirhead	81%	Stina Viktorsson	81%
Total	78%	Total	82%

== Group B ==
=== Teams ===
Austria	Czech Republic	England (relegated from 2009 A group)	Estonia	Hungary
Skip: Karina Toth Third: Constanze Hummelt; Second: Marion Schön; Lead: Andrea Höfler; Alternate: Tina Sauerstein	Skip: Anna Kubeskova Third: Tereza Pliskova; Second: Veronika Herdova; Lead: Elsika Jalovcova; Alternate: Luisa Illkova	Skip: Lorna Rettig Third: Kirsty Balfour; Second: Nicola Woodward; Lead: Suzie Law	Skip: Eve-Lyn Korka Third: Liisa Turmann; Second: Küllike Ustav; Lead: Marie Turmann; Alternate: Gerli Roosme	Skip: Ildiko Szekeres Third: Alexandra Beres; Second: Gyöngyi Nagy; Lead: Bolgkara Adam; Alternate: Krisztina Bartalus
Italy (relegated from 2009 A group)	Ireland (advanced from 2010 C Group)	Spain	Turkey (advanced from 2010 C Group)	Wales
Skip: Giorgia Apollonio Third: Federica Apollonio; Second: Chiara Zanotelli; Lead: Claudia Alvera; Alternate: Stefania Menardi	Skip: Carolyn Hibberd Third: Louise Kerr; Second: Hazel Gormley Leahy; Lead: Melanie Porter; Alternate: Marie O'Kane	Skip: Irantzu Garcia Vez Third: Estrella Labrador Amo; Second: Maria Fernandez Picado; Lead: Elena Altuna Lopez; Alternate: Itziar Ortiz de Urbina	Skip: Aysun Ergin Third: Öznur Polat; Second: Öznur Akbaş; Lead: Elif Kızılkaya; Alternate: Burcu Pehlivan	Skip: Laura Beever Third: Lisa Peters; Second: Andrea Greenwood; Lead: Jane Robbins

=== Standings ===
Key
Countries to Playoffs
Countries relegated to 2011 Group C

Rank	Country	Skip	W	L
1	Czech Republic	Anna Kubeskova	9	0
2	Hungary	Ildiko Szekeres	7	2
3	Austria	Karina Toth	7	2
4	Italy	Stefania Mendari	7	2
5	England	Lorna Rettig	4	5
6	Spain	Irantzu Garcia Vez	3	6
7	Estonia	Eve-Lyn Korka	3	6
8	Wales	Laura Beever	2	7
8	Ireland	Carolyn Hibberd	2	7
10	Turkey	Aysun Ergin	1	8

=== Results ===
==== Draw 1 ====
Saturday, December 4, 12:00

Sheet F	1	2	3	4	5	6	7	8	9	10	Final
Wales (Beever)	0	1	0	0	0	0	X	X	X	X	1
Czech Republic (Kubeskova)	3	0	2	1	1	1	X	X	X	X	8

Sheet G	1	2	3	4	5	6	7	8	9	10	Final
Ireland (Hibberd)	1	0	0	1	1	0	2	0	3	0	8
Estonia (Korka)	0	3	2	0	0	1	0	1	0	2	9

Sheet H	1	2	3	4	5	6	7	8	9	10	Final
Italy (Mendari)	0	1	0	1	0	1	0	1	0	0	4
Hungary (Szekeres)	0	0	2	0	2	0	1	0	1	1	7

Sheet I	1	2	3	4	5	6	7	8	9	10	Final
Austria (Toth)	3	1	2	0	1	0	1	2	0	X	10
Turkey (Ergin)	0	0	0	1	0	1	0	0	2	X	4

Sheet K	1	2	3	4	5	6	7	8	9	10	Final
England (Rettig)	0	5	2	1	0	0	1	X	X	X	9
Spain (Garcia Vez)	1	0	0	0	1	1	0	X	X	X	3

==== Draw 2 ====
Saturday, December 4, 20:00

Sheet F	1	2	3	4	5	6	7	8	9	10	Final
Ireland (Hibberd)	0	1	2	0	1	0	1	0	0	1	6
Austria (Toth)	1	0	0	3	0	1	0	1	1	0	7

Sheet H	1	2	3	4	5	6	7	8	9	10	Final
England (Rettig)	0	0	1	0	1	0	2	0	0	X	4
Czech Republic (Kubeskova)	2	1	0	2	0	2	0	2	3	X	12

Sheet J	1	2	3	4	5	6	7	8	9	10	Final
Spain (Garcia Vez)	0	0	0	1	0	0	X	X	X	X	1
Italy (Mendari)	3	4	2	0	2	2	X	X	X	X	13

Sheet K	1	2	3	4	5	6	7	8	9	10	Final
Wales (Beever)	3	1	2	2	0	2	0	4	X	X	14
Turkey (Ergin)	0	0	0	0	2	0	1	0	X	X	3

Sheet L	1	2	3	4	5	6	7	8	9	10	Final
Hungary (Szekeres)	2	0	1	1	0	0	0	2	0	3	9
Estonia (Korka)	0	1	0	0	2	1	1	0	2	0	7

==== Draw 3 ====
Sunday, December 5, 12:00

Sheet F	1	2	3	4	5	6	7	8	9	10	Final
Hungary (Szekeres)	0	4	3	2	3	4	X	X	X	X	16
Spain (Garcia Vez)	1	0	0	0	0	0	X	X	X	X	1

Sheet G	1	2	3	4	5	6	7	8	9	10	Final
Turkey (Ergin)	0	1	0	0	0	0	1	0	X	X	2
Czech Republic (Kubeskova)	1	0	3	3	2	0	0	4	X	X	13

Sheet H	1	2	3	4	5	6	7	8	9	10	Final
Wales (Beever)	1	0	0	1	1	0	0	4	0	2	9
Ireland (Hibberd)	0	1	3	0	0	1	1	0	0	0	6

Sheet J	1	2	3	4	5	6	7	8	9	10	Final
England (Rettig)	0	1	0	3	0	0	0	2	0	X	6
Estonia (Korka)	2	0	1	0	1	2	1	0	2	X	9

Sheet L	1	2	3	4	5	6	7	8	9	10	Final
Austria (Toth)	2	1	1	0	0	0	1	0	0	0	5
Italy (Mendari)	0	0	0	3	0	1	0	1	0	1	6

==== Draw 4 ====
Sunday, December 5, 20:00

Sheet G	1	2	3	4	5	6	7	8	9	10	Final
Austria (Toth)	0	0	1	0	4	1	0	0	0	2	8
Hungary (Szekeres)	1	0	0	1	0	0	2	2	1	0	7

Sheet H	1	2	3	4	5	6	7	8	9	10	Final
Czech Republic (Kubeskova)	2	0	1	0	1	0	2	0	0	2	8
Estonia (Korka)	0	0	0	1	0	3	0	1	2	0	7

Sheet J	1	2	3	4	5	6	7	8	9	10	Final
Italy (Mendari)	1	0	2	2	3	0	X	X	X	X	8
Ireland (Hibberd)	0	1	0	0	0	1	X	X	X	X	2

Sheet K	1	2	3	4	5	6	7	8	9	10	Final
Spain (Garcia Vez)	3	0	5	0	3	0	1	0	X	X	12
Wales (Beever)	0	4	0	2	0	1	0	1	X	X	8

Sheet L	1	2	3	4	5	6	7	8	9	10	Final
Turkey (Ergin)	1	0	1	0	0	1	0	0	X	X	3
England (Rettig)	0	6	0	1	0	0	4	2	X	X	13

==== Draw 5 ====
Monday, December 6, 12:00

Sheet F	1	2	3	4	5	6	7	8	9	10	Final
Czech Republic (Kubeskova)	1	0	1	0	4	0	4	0	4	X	14
Hungary (Szekeres)	0	1	0	3	0	2	0	2	0	X	8

Sheet G	1	2	3	4	5	6	7	8	9	10	Final
Spain (Garcia Vez)	0	3	0	0	1	0	1	1	1	0	7
Ireland (Hibberd)	1	0	3	0	0	2	0	0	0	3	9

Sheet H	1	2	3	4	5	6	7	8	9	10	Final
Turkey (Ergin)	0	0	0	0	1	0	0	0	0	X	1
Italy (Mendari)	0	1	2	1	0	1	2	1	1	X	9

Sheet K	1	2	3	4	5	6	7	8	9	10	Final
England (Rettig)	0	0	0	1	0	1	1	0	0	X	3
Austria (Toth)	0	0	2	0	3	0	0	1	1	X	7

Sheet L	1	2	3	4	5	6	7	8	9	10	Final
Estonia (Korka)	1	0	3	1	4	1	0	X	X	X	10
Wales (Beever)	0	1	0	0	0	0	1	X	X	X	2

==== Draw 6 ====
Monday, December 6, 20:00

Sheet G	1	2	3	4	5	6	7	8	9	10	Final
Estonia (Korka)	0	0	1	0	1	1	1	0	0	X	4
Turkey (Ergin)	0	2	0	1	0	0	0	4	2	X	9

Sheet H	1	2	3	4	5	6	7	8	9	10	Final
Spain (Garcia Vez)	0	0	1	1	0	0	0	1	0	X	3
Austria (Toth)	2	0	0	0	4	0	1	0	2	X	9

Sheet J	1	2	3	4	5	6	7	8	9	10	Final
Wales (Beever)	0	1	0	1	0	0	0	1	2	X	5
England (Rettig)	1	0	2	0	3	1	1	0	0	X	8

Sheet K	1	2	3	4	5	6	7	8	9	10	Final
Ireland (Hibberd)	0	0	0	1	0	1	0	X	X	X	2
Hungary (Szekeres)	1	1	2	0	4	0	2	X	X	X	10

Sheet L	1	2	3	4	5	6	7	8	9	10	Final
Italy (Mendari)	0	1	0	0	0	0	0	X	X	X	1
Czech Republic (Kubeskova)	0	0	1	1	1	3	3	X	X	X	9

==== Draw 7 ====
Tuesday, December 7, 12:00

Sheet F	1	2	3	4	5	6	7	8	9	10	Final
Austria (Toth)	0	2	1	0	2	0	2	0	0	X	7
Estonia (Korka)	1	0	0	1	0	1	0	0	1	X	4

Sheet G	1	2	3	4	5	6	7	8	9	10	Final
Italy (Mendari)	0	4	3	2	0	2	X	X	X	X	11
Wales (Beever)	1	0	0	0	1	0	X	X	X	X	2

Sheet H	1	2	3	4	5	6	7	8	9	10	Final
Ireland (Hibberd)	3	0	1	1	0	0	0	1	0	X	6
England (Rettig)	0	1	0	0	1	2	2	0	3	X	9

Sheet J	1	2	3	4	5	6	7	8	9	10	Final
Turkey (Ergin)	0	0	1	0	0	1	X	X	X	X	2
Hungary (Szekeres)	3	2	0	4	1	0	X	X	X	X	10

Sheet K	1	2	3	4	5	6	7	8	9	10	Final
Czech Republic (Kubeskova)	0	0	0	0	1	0	0	0	0	6	7
Spain (Garcia Vez)	0	0	1	0	0	0	0	0	1	0	2

==== Draw 8 ====
Tuesday, December 7, 20:00

Sheet F	1	2	3	4	5	6	7	8	9	10	Final
Spain (Garcia Vez)	0	4	2	0	0	1	1	0	2	X	10
Turkey (Ergin)	1	0	0	1	2	0	0	1	0	X	5

Sheet G	1	2	3	4	5	6	7	8	9	10	Final
Hungary (Szekeres)	1	0	0	1	0	3	0	1	1	X	7
England (Rettig)	0	1	0	0	1	0	2	0	0	X	4

Sheet J	1	2	3	4	5	6	7	8	9	10	Final
Czech Republic (Kubeskova)	0	1	0	0	0	4	4	2	X	X	11
Ireland (Hibberd)	1	0	1	1	1	0	0	0	X	X	4

Sheet K	1	2	3	4	5	6	7	8	9	10	Final
Estonia (Korka)	1	0	1	0	0	0	0	1	0	X	3
Italy (Mendari)	0	1	0	1	0	2	1	0	3	X	8

Sheet L	1	2	3	4	5	6	7	8	9	10	Final
Wales (Beever)	0	0	0	1	0	3	0	0	X	X	4
Austria (Toth)	3	0	1	0	6	0	1	2	X	X	13

==== Draw 9 ====
Wednesday, December 8, 12:00

Sheet F	1	2	3	4	5	6	7	8	9	10	Final
England (Rettig)	0	0	1	0	0	1	0	1	0	X	3
Italy (Mendari)	1	0	0	3	1	0	1	0	1	X	7

Sheet H	1	2	3	4	5	6	7	8	9	10	Final
Estonia (Korka)	1	0	0	1	1	0	0	0	1	X	4
Spain (Garcia Vez)	0	2	1	0	0	1	1	1	0	X	6

Sheet J	1	2	3	4	5	6	7	8	9	10	Final
Hungary (Szekeres)	1	0	3	0	3	1	X	X	X	X	8
Wales (Beever)	0	1	0	1	0	0	X	X	X	X	2

Sheet K	1	2	3	4	5	6	7	8	9	10	Final
Austria (Toth)	0	0	2	0	1	0	1	0	2	X	6
Czech Republic (Kubeskova)	3	1	0	2	0	0	0	2	0	X	8

Sheet L	1	2	3	4	5	6	7	8	9	10	Final
Ireland (Hibberd)	4	0	0	0	1	0	3	3	0	X	11
Turkey (Ergin)	0	0	1	2	0	2	0	0	2	X	7

=== Tiebreaker ===
Thursday, December 9, 9:00
placement tiebreaker, decides relegated team

Sheet H	1	2	3	4	5	6	7	8	9	10	Final
Ireland (Hibberd)	1	1	0	0	0	0	2	2	0	0	6
Wales (Beever)	0	0	2	2	0	1	0	0	3	3	11

=== Playoffs ===
Page playoff system
1	Czech Republic	8
2	Hungary	6
3	Austria	3
4	Italy	6

Semifinal
2	Hungary	6
4	Italy	7

Gold-medal game
1	Czech Republic	14
4	Italy	7

Bronze-medal game
3	Austria	5
2	Hungary	4

==== 1 vs. 2 ====
Thursday, December 9, 18:00

Sheet H	1	2	3	4	5	6	7	8	9	10	11	Final
Czech Republic (Kubeskova)	1	0	0	1	0	1	0	3	0	0	2	8
Hungary (Szekeres)	0	0	1	0	2	0	2	0	1	0	0	6

==== 3 vs. 4 ====
Thursday, December 9, 18:00

Sheet K	1	2	3	4	5	6	7	8	9	10	Final
Austria (Toth)	0	1	0	0	2	0	0	0	0	0	3
Italy (Mendari)	0	0	0	1	0	2	0	0	0	3	6

==== Semifinal ====
Friday, December 10, 18:00

Sheet G	1	2	3	4	5	6	7	8	9	10	Final
Hungary (Szekeres)	1	0	1	0	0	0	2	0	2	X	6
Italy (Mendari)	0	3	0	1	0	2	0	1	0	X	7

==== Bronze-medal game ====
Saturday, December 11, 9:30

Sheet J	1	2	3	4	5	6	7	8	9	10	11	Final
Austria (Toth)	0	0	0	1	0	0	0	2	0	1	1	5
Hungary (Szekeres)	0	0	0	0	3	0	0	0	1	0	0	4

==== Gold-medal game ====
Friday, December 10, 13:00

Sheet J	1	2	3	4	5	6	7	8	9	10	Final
Czech Republic (Kubeskova)	2	0	1	0	0	0	6	0	5	X	14
Italy (Mendari)	0	1	0	1	3	1	0	1	0	X	7

== Group C ==
=== Teams ===
Croatia	Ireland	Serbia	Slovakia	Turkey
Skip: Marta Muzdalo Third: Zrinka Muhek; Second: Marija Simunjak; Lead: Janja Gros; Alternate: Vanja Hinic	Skip: Carolyn Hibberd Third: Louise Kerr; Second: Hazel Gormley Leahy; Lead: Melanie Porter; Alternate: Marie O'Kane	Skip: Olivera Momcilovic Third: Dara Gravara-Stojanovic; Second: Tatjana Jeftic; Lead: Dragana Simjanovic	Skip: Daniela Matulova Third: Veronika Kvasnovska; Second: Linda Haferova; Lead: Terezia Gabovicova	Skip: Canan Melis Akyildiz Third: Aysun Ergin; Second: Öznur Polat; Lead: Seyda Zengin; Alternate: Öznur Akbas

=== Standings ===
Nation	Skip	Win	Loss	Ends Won	Ends Lost
Turkey	Canan Melis Akyildiz	4	0	22	14
Ireland	Carolyn Hibberd	3	1	22	13
Slovakia	Daniela Matulova	2	2	20	17
Croatia	Marta Muzdalo	1	3	12	20
Serbia	Olivera Momcilovic	0	4	10	22

=== Results ===
==== Draw 1 ====
Friday, 24 September, 21:00

Sheet A	1	2	3	4	5	6	7	8	9	10	Final
Slovakia (Matulova)	0	5	1	0	0	0	2	1	3	–	12
Croatia (Muzdalo)	1	0	0	2	1	1	0	0	0	–	5

Sheet C	1	2	3	4	5	6	7	8	9	10	Final
Serbia (Momcilovic)	0	1	0	1	0	2	1	1	0	0	6
Turkey (Akyildiz)	2	0	2	0	1	0	0	0	2	2	9

Ireland receives bye this round.

==== Draw 2 ====
Saturday, 25 September, 12:00

Sheet D	1	2	3	4	5	6	7	8	9	10	Final
Ireland (Hibberd)	3	3	2	1	1	2	X	X	X	X	12
Serbia (Momcilovic)	0	0	0	0	0	0	X	X	X	X	0

Sheet E	1	2	3	4	5	6	7	8	9	10	Final
Turkey (Akyildiz)	0	2	3	1	0	0	0	2	1	1	10
Slovakia (Matulova)	3	0	0	0	3	1	1	0	0	0	8

Croatia receives bye this round.

==== Draw 3 ====
Saturday, 25 September, 19:00

Sheet A	1	2	3	4	5	6	7	8	9	10	Final
Turkey (Akyildiz)	0	3	0	3	3	0	0	0	3	1	13
Ireland (Hibberd)	2	0	3	0	0	1	2	1	0	0	9

Sheet B	1	2	3	4	5	6	7	8	9	10	Final
Croatia (Muzdalo)	0	0	0	2	3	1	1	3	X	X	10
Serbia (Momcilovic)	1	1	1	0	0	0	0	0	X	X	3

Slovakia receives bye this round.

==== Draw 4 ====
Sunday, 26 September, 10:00

Sheet E	1	2	3	4	5	6	7	8	9	10	Final
Ireland (Hibberd)	0	4	1	1	0	1	1	0	3	X	11
Croatia (Muzdalo)	1	0	0	0	3	0	0	1	0	X	5

Sheet F	1	2	3	4	5	6	7	8	9	10	Final
Slovakia (Matulova)	1	4	2	0	1	3	0	1	X	X	12
Serbia (Momcilovic)	0	0	0	2	0	0	1	0	X	X	3

Turkey receives bye this round.

==== Draw 5 ====
Sunday, 26 September, 15:00

Sheet C	1	2	3	4	5	6	7	8	9	10	Final
Slovakia (Matulova)	0	3	1	1	2	0	0	0	1	0	8
Ireland (Hibberd)	1	0	0	0	0	1	3	3	0	1	9

Sheet F	1	2	3	4	5	6	7	8	9	10	Final
Croatia (Muzdalo)	0	0	0	0	0	0	X	X	X	X	0
Turkey (Akyildiz)	1	2	1	1	1	1	X	X	X	X	7

Serbia receives bye this round.

==== Final ====
Monday, 27 September, 18:00

Sheet E	1	2	3	4	5	6	7	8	9	10	Final
Ireland (Hibberd)	4	0	0	0	2	1	3	1	X	X	11
Turkey (Akyildiz)	0	1	1	1	0	0	0	0	X	X	3

Ireland and Turkey advance to the Group B competition in Monthey.
