= 2016 World Women's Curling Championship =

- Host city: Swift Current, Saskatchewan
- Arena: Credit Union iPlex
- Dates: March 19–27
- Attendance: 52,138
- Winner: Switzerland
- Curling club: CC Flims, Flims
- Skip: Binia Feltscher
- Third: Irene Schori
- Second: Franziska Kaufmann
- Lead: Christine Urech
- Alternate: Carole Howald
- Coach: Al Moore
- Finalist: Japan (Satsuki Fujisawa)

The 2016 World Women's Curling Championship (branded as the 2016 Ford World Women's Curling Championship presented by Meridian for sponsorship reasons) was held from March 19 to 27 at the Credit Union iPlex in Swift Current, Saskatchewan.

Team Switzerland won the championship 9–6 over Team Japan. The playoffs made history for Team Japan, which had never made the final before.

Switzerland's win makes this their country's 6th Women's World Championship gold medal, 3rd gold medal in a row, and 4th gold medal in the last 5 years.

== Qualification ==
The following nations qualified to participate in the 2016 World Women's Curling Championship:

- Canada (host country)
- One team from the Americas zone
  - United States (given that no challenges in the Americas zone are issued)
- Eight teams from the 2015 European Curling Championships
  - Denmark
  - Finland
  - Germany
  - Russia
  - Scotland
  - Sweden
  - Switzerland
  - Italy
- Two teams from the 2015 Pacific-Asia Curling Championships
  - Japan
  - South Korea

== Teams ==
Canada	Denmark	Finland
The Glencoe Club, Calgary Skip: Chelsea Carey; Third: Amy Nixon; Second: Jocelyn Peterman; Lead: Laine Peters; Alternate: Susan O'Connor	Hvidovre CC, Hvidovre Skip: Lene Nielsen; Third: Stephanie Risdal; Second: Isabella Clemmensen; Lead: Charlotte Clemmensen; Alternate: Madeleine Dupont	Åland Curling, Eckerö Skip: Oona Kauste; Third: Milja Hellsten; Second: Maija Salmiovirta; Lead: Marjo Hippi; Alternate: Jenni Räsänen
Germany	Italy	Japan
CC Füssen, Füssen Skip: Daniela Driendl; Third: Analena Jentsch; Second: Marika Trettin; Lead: Pia-Lisa Schöll; Alternate: Maike Beer	CC Tofane, Cortina d'Ampezzo Skip: Federica Apollonio; Third: Stefania Menardi; Second: Chiara Olivieri; Lead: Maria Gaspari; Alternate: Claudia Alverà	Tokoro CC, Kitami Skip: Satsuki Fujisawa; Third: Chinami Yoshida; Second: Yumi Suzuki; Lead: Yurika Yoshida; Alternate: Mari Motohashi
Russia	Scotland	South Korea
Moskvitch CC, Moscow Skip: Anna Sidorova; Third: Margarita Fomina; Second: Alexandra Raeva; Lead: Nkeiruka Ezekh; Alternate: Alina Kovaleva	Dunkeld CC, Pitlochry Skip: Eve Muirhead; Third: Anna Sloan; Second: Vicki Adams; Lead: Sarah Reid; Alternate: Rachel Hannen	Gyeonggi-do CC, Uijeongbu Fourth: Gim Un-chi; Third: Um Min-ji; Second: Lee Seul-bee; Skip: Kim Ji-sun; Alternate: Yeom Yoon-jung
Sweden	Switzerland	United States
Skellefteå CK, Skellefteå Fourth: Maria Prytz; Third: Christina Bertrup; Second: Maria Wennerström; Skip: Margaretha Sigfridsson; Alternate: Agnes Knochenhauer	CC Flims, Flims Skip: Binia Feltscher; Third: Irene Schori; Second: Franziska Kaufmann; Lead: Christine Urech; Alternate: Carole Howald	Madison CC, Madison Skip: Erika Brown; Third: Allison Pottinger; Second: Nicole Joraanstad; Lead: Natalie Nicholson; Alternate: Tabitha Peterson

=== WCT ranking ===
World Curling Tour Order of Merit ranking of national teams (year to date total)

Country (Skip)	Rank	Points
Canada (Carey)	5	295.750
Russia (Sidorova)	6	290.022
Scotland (Muirhead)	8	256.481
United States (Brown)	13	214.512
Sweden (Sigfridsson)	21	129.750
Switzerland (Feltscher)	22	129.555
Japan (Fujisawa)	32	102.154
South Korea (Kim/Gim)	64	53.348
Denmark (Nielsen)	66	51.355
Finland (Kauste)	80	34.239
Germany (Driendl)	82	33.213
Italy (Apollonio)	145	12.168

== Round robin standings ==
Key
Teams to Playoffs
Teams to Tiebreaker

Final Round Robin Standings

Locale	Skip	W	L	PF	PA	Ends Won	Ends Lost	Blank Ends	Stolen Ends	Shot Pct.
Switzerland	Binia Feltscher	9	2	69	55	44	41	21	10	84%
Japan	Satsuki Fujisawa	9	2	81	48	45	33	15	11	87%
Russia	Anna Sidorova	8	3	71	47	45	34	18	15	82%
Canada	Chelsea Carey	8	3	74	56	44	39	15	12	84%
Scotland	Eve Muirhead	7	4	71	61	46	40	13	13	85%
United States	Erika Brown	6	5	64	58	45	40	20	8	84%
South Korea	Kim Ji-sun	5	6	66	75	40	45	15	8	82%
Denmark	Lene Nielsen	5	6	68	73	43	47	14	9	81%
Sweden	Margaretha Sigfridsson	4	7	66	68	44	46	13	6	81%
Germany	Daniela Driendl	3	8	40	59	21	27	13	6	79%
Finland	Oona Kauste	1	10	44	60	28	37	10	4	75%
Italy	Federica Apollonio	1	10	36	57	27	33	12	7	77%

== Round robin results ==
All draw times are listed in Central Time Zone (UTC−6).

=== Draw 1 ===
Saturday, March 19, 14:00

Sheet A	1	2	3	4	5	6	7	8	9	10	Final
United States (Brown)	1	0	1	0	0	0	1	0	1	0	4
Switzerland (Feltscher)	0	2	0	0	0	1	0	1	0	1	5

Sheet B	1	2	3	4	5	6	7	8	9	10	Final
Japan (Fujisawa)	0	2	0	0	2	2	0	1	0	X	7
Finland (Kauste)	1	0	1	2	0	0	0	0	1	X	5

Sheet C	1	2	3	4	5	6	7	8	9	10	Final
Russia (Sidorova)	2	1	3	0	0	1	0	1	X	X	8
Italy (Apollonio)	0	0	0	1	0	0	1	0	X	X	2

Sheet D	1	2	3	4	5	6	7	8	9	10	11	Final
Canada (Carey)	0	0	2	0	1	0	1	0	3	0	1	8
Denmark (Nielsen)	3	1	0	0	0	1	0	1	0	1	0	7

=== Draw 2 ===
Saturday, March 19, 19:00

Sheet A	1	2	3	4	5	6	7	8	9	10	Final
Italy (Apollonio)	0	0	1	0	1	0	1	0	X	X	3
Japan (Fujisawa)	0	3	0	3	0	2	0	2	X	X	10

Sheet B	1	2	3	4	5	6	7	8	9	10	Final
Scotland (Muirhead)	0	0	1	0	0	0	1	0	1	0	3
Sweden (Sigfridsson)	0	0	0	0	2	1	0	1	0	1	5

Sheet C	1	2	3	4	5	6	7	8	9	10	Final
Germany (Driendl)	0	3	0	1	1	0	2	1	0	X	8
South Korea (Kim)	0	0	1	0	0	2	0	0	2	X	5

Sheet D	1	2	3	4	5	6	7	8	9	10	Final
Russia (Sidorova)	1	0	1	1	0	2	0	2	0	X	7
Finland (Kauste)	0	0	0	0	1	0	2	0	1	X	4

=== Draw 3 ===
Sunday, March 20, 9:00

Sheet B	1	2	3	4	5	6	7	8	9	10	11	Final
Denmark (Nielsen)	0	1	0	0	1	0	2	0	3	0	1	8
United States (Brown)	0	0	0	2	0	1	0	2	0	2	0	7

Sheet C	1	2	3	4	5	6	7	8	9	10	Final
Canada (Carey)	0	0	0	2	0	0	0	1	3	1	7
Switzerland (Feltscher)	1	0	0	0	0	1	2	0	0	0	4

=== Draw 4 ===
Sunday, March 20, 14:00

Sheet A	1	2	3	4	5	6	7	8	9	10	Final
Sweden (Sigfridsson)	0	0	2	0	2	0	2	0	0	X	6
Germany (Driendl)	0	1	0	2	0	2	0	2	2	X	9

Sheet B	1	2	3	4	5	6	7	8	9	10	Final
Finland (Kauste)	2	2	0	3	0	0	0	1	0	0	8
Italy (Apollonio)	0	0	1	0	2	0	1	0	2	1	7

Sheet C	1	2	3	4	5	6	7	8	9	10	Final
Japan (Fujisawa)	0	2	0	0	2	1	1	0	0	X	6
Russia (Sidorova)	0	0	0	1	0	0	0	0	0	X	1

Sheet D	1	2	3	4	5	6	7	8	9	10	Final
Scotland (Muirhead)	2	1	0	2	0	2	0	1	0	X	8
South Korea (Kim)	0	0	1	0	2	0	2	0	1	X	6

=== Draw 5 ===
Sunday, March 20, 19:00

Sheet A	1	2	3	4	5	6	7	8	9	10	Final
Switzerland (Feltscher)	0	0	2	1	0	2	0	1	0	1	7
Denmark (Nielsen)	0	1	0	0	2	0	2	0	1	0	6

Sheet B	1	2	3	4	5	6	7	8	9	10	Final
Germany (Driendl)	1	0	1	0	1	0	0	X	X	X	3
Scotland (Muirhead)	0	3	0	2	0	1	4	X	X	X	10

Sheet C	1	2	3	4	5	6	7	8	9	10	Final
South Korea (Kim)	1	0	0	2	0	1	0	3	0	1	8
Sweden (Sigfridsson)	0	2	0	0	1	0	1	0	2	0	6

Sheet D	1	2	3	4	5	6	7	8	9	10	Final
United States (Brown)	0	1	0	1	0	0	X	X	X	X	2
Canada (Carey)	4	0	1	0	1	4	X	X	X	X	10

=== Draw 6 ===
Monday, March 21, 9:00

Sheet A	1	2	3	4	5	6	7	8	9	10	Final
Canada (Carey)	0	0	3	0	0	0	0	0	0	X	3
Russia (Sidorova)	2	0	0	0	0	0	2	1	1	X	6

Sheet B	1	2	3	4	5	6	7	8	9	10	Final
Denmark (Nielsen)	2	2	0	3	0	0	0	4	X	X	11
Japan (Fujisawa)	0	0	1	0	1	1	1	0	X	X	4

Sheet C	1	2	3	4	5	6	7	8	9	10	Final
United States (Brown)	0	1	1	0	0	0	2	1	0	X	5
Italy (Apollonio)	1	0	0	0	2	0	0	0	0	X	3

Sheet D	1	2	3	4	5	6	7	8	9	10	Final
Switzerland (Feltscher)	1	0	3	0	3	0	0	0	2	X	9
Finland (Kauste)	0	2	0	1	0	0	3	0	0	X	6

=== Draw 7 ===
Monday, March 21, 14:00

Sheet A	1	2	3	4	5	6	7	8	9	10	11	Final
Japan (Fujisawa)	1	0	0	1	0	0	1	0	2	0	1	6
South Korea (Kim)	0	1	0	0	2	0	0	1	0	1	0	5

Sheet B	1	2	3	4	5	6	7	8	9	10	Final
Russia (Sidorova)	0	0	3	1	2	0	1	0	3	X	10
Sweden (Sigfridsson)	0	2	0	0	0	2	0	1	0	X	5

Sheet C	1	2	3	4	5	6	7	8	9	10	Final
Finland (Kauste)	0	3	0	2	0	1	0	0	0	0	6
Germany (Driendl)	0	0	1	0	2	0	0	3	1	2	9

Sheet D	1	2	3	4	5	6	7	8	9	10	Final
Italy (Apollonio)	0	0	1	2	1	0	0	0	3	0	7
Scotland (Muirhead)	3	2	0	0	0	1	0	1	0	1	8

=== Draw 8 ===
Monday, March 21, 19:00

Sheet A	1	2	3	4	5	6	7	8	9	10	Final
Scotland (Muirhead)	0	2	1	0	0	0	0	1	0	2	6
United States (Brown)	2	0	0	0	2	0	0	0	1	0	5

Sheet B	1	2	3	4	5	6	7	8	9	10	Final
Germany (Driendl)	0	1	0	0	1	0	0	0	X	X	2
Switzerland (Feltscher)	0	0	3	0	0	2	2	2	X	X	9

Sheet C	1	2	3	4	5	6	7	8	9	10	Final
Sweden (Sigfridsson)	1	0	1	0	0	1	0	1	0	0	4
Canada (Carey)	0	1	0	1	2	0	1	0	2	2	9

Sheet D	1	2	3	4	5	6	7	8	9	10	Final
South Korea (Kim)	2	0	2	0	0	0	3	2	X	X	9
Denmark (Nielsen)	0	3	0	0	0	0	0	0	X	X	3

=== Draw 9 ===
Tuesday, March 22, 9:00

Sheet A	1	2	3	4	5	6	7	8	9	10	Final
Sweden (Sigfridsson)	0	1	0	0	0	1	2	0	1	0	5
Switzerland (Feltscher)	1	0	0	1	1	0	0	2	0	1	6

Sheet B	1	2	3	4	5	6	7	8	9	10	Final
South Korea (Kim)	0	0	1	0	1	1	0	0	X	X	3
United States (Brown)	2	1	0	1	0	0	4	2	X	X	10

Sheet C	1	2	3	4	5	6	7	8	9	10	Final
Scotland (Muirhead)	3	0	0	2	0	0	1	0	3	X	9
Denmark (Nielsen)	0	1	0	0	1	1	0	0	0	X	3

Sheet D	1	2	3	4	5	6	7	8	9	10	Final
Germany (Driendl)	0	1	0	0	3	0	0	0	1	0	5
Canada (Carey)	1	0	0	1	0	2	1	1	0	1	7

=== Draw 10 ===
Tuesday, March 22, 14:00

Sheet A	1	2	3	4	5	6	7	8	9	10	Final
Denmark (Nielsen)	1	0	0	2	0	1	1	0	1	X	6
Finland (Kauste)	0	2	0	0	1	0	0	1	0	X	4

Sheet B	1	2	3	4	5	6	7	8	9	10	Final
Canada (Carey)	1	0	1	0	0	0	2	0	0	1	5
Italy (Apollonio)	0	1	0	1	1	0	0	0	1	0	4

Sheet C	1	2	3	4	5	6	7	8	9	10	Final
Switzerland (Feltscher)	0	2	0	0	0	3	0	0	2	X	7
Japan (Fujisawa)	0	0	0	0	2	0	1	1	0	X	4

Sheet D	1	2	3	4	5	6	7	8	9	10	11	Final
United States (Brown)	0	2	0	1	0	1	0	1	0	0	1	6
Russia (Sidorova)	0	0	1	0	1	0	1	0	0	2	0	5

=== Draw 11 ===
Tuesday, March 22, 19:00

Sheet A	1	2	3	4	5	6	7	8	9	10	Final
Italy (Apollonio)	1	0	0	0	1	0	0	3	1	X	6
Germany (Driendl)	0	0	1	0	0	1	0	0	0	X	2

Sheet B	1	2	3	4	5	6	7	8	9	10	Final
Finland (Kauste)	1	0	2	0	0	0	1	0	1	0	5
Scotland (Muirhead)	0	1	0	0	2	1	0	1	0	1	6

Sheet C	1	2	3	4	5	6	7	8	9	10	Final
Russia (Sidorova)	3	0	0	0	1	1	4	X	X	X	9
South Korea (Kim)	0	1	0	0	0	0	0	X	X	X	1

Sheet D	1	2	3	4	5	6	7	8	9	10	Final
Japan (Fujisawa)	0	0	2	0	2	1	0	2	0	1	8
Sweden (Sigfridsson)	0	1	0	1	0	0	1	0	1	0	4

=== Draw 12 ===
Wednesday, March 23, 9:00

Sheet A	1	2	3	4	5	6	7	8	9	10	Final
Russia (Sidorova)	0	0	0	0	0	0	1	X	X	X	1
Scotland (Muirhead)	1	3	1	0	1	1	0	X	X	X	7

Sheet B	1	2	3	4	5	6	7	8	9	10	Final
Japan (Fujisawa)	0	4	0	3	0	1	X	X	X	X	8
Germany (Driendl)	0	0	1	0	0	0	X	X	X	X	1

Sheet C	1	2	3	4	5	6	7	8	9	10	Final
Italy (Apollonio)	0	0	1	0	3	0	1	0	X	X	5
Sweden (Sigfridsson)	2	2	0	4	0	1	0	2	X	X	11

Sheet D	1	2	3	4	5	6	7	8	9	10	Final
Finland (Kauste)	0	1	3	0	1	0	1	0	0	X	6
South Korea (Kim)	0	0	0	2	0	1	0	3	3	X	9

=== Draw 13 ===
Wednesday, March 23, 14:00

Sheet A	1	2	3	4	5	6	7	8	9	10	Final
South Korea (Kim)	0	2	0	1	0	0	1	0	2	2	8
Canada (Carey)	0	0	2	0	0	2	0	3	0	0	7

Sheet B	1	2	3	4	5	6	7	8	9	10	Final
Sweden (Sigfridsson)	1	1	0	1	1	0	1	0	1	X	6
Denmark (Nielsen)	0	0	1	0	0	0	0	1	0	X	2

Sheet C	1	2	3	4	5	6	7	8	9	10	Final
Germany (Driendl)	0	0	1	0	0	2	0	0	1	0	4
United States (Brown)	0	1	0	1	1	0	2	0	0	2	7

Sheet D	1	2	3	4	5	6	7	8	9	10	11	Final
Scotland (Muirhead)	2	0	1	2	0	0	0	0	0	1	0	6
Switzerland (Feltscher)	0	1	0	0	0	2	1	1	1	0	1	7

=== Draw 14 ===
Wednesday, March 23, 19:00

Sheet A	1	2	3	4	5	6	7	8	9	10	Final
United States (Brown)	0	1	0	2	0	0	1	0	0	1	5
Japan (Fujisawa)	1	0	2	0	1	2	0	0	1	0	7

Sheet B	1	2	3	4	5	6	7	8	9	10	Final
Switzerland (Feltscher)	0	0	0	2	0	0	0	1	0	X	3
Russia (Sidorova)	1	1	1	0	1	1	0	0	1	X	6

Sheet C	1	2	3	4	5	6	7	8	9	10	Final
Canada (Carey)	2	1	0	1	1	2	0	X	X	X	7
Finland (Kauste)	0	0	0	0	0	0	1	X	X	X	1

Sheet D	1	2	3	4	5	6	7	8	9	10	Final
Denmark (Nielsen)	0	0	2	0	2	0	2	0	1	X	7
Italy (Apollonio)	0	2	0	1	0	1	0	1	0	X	5

=== Draw 15 ===
Thursday, March 24, 9:00

Sheet A	1	2	3	4	5	6	7	8	9	10	Final
Finland (Kauste)	0	0	1	1	0	1	0	X	X	X	3
Sweden (Sigfridsson)	0	5	0	0	1	0	4	X	X	X	10

Sheet B	1	2	3	4	5	6	7	8	9	10	Final
Italy (Apollonio)	0	0	1	2	0	0	1	1	0	X	5
South Korea (Kim)	0	0	0	0	2	1	0	0	4	X	7

Sheet C	1	2	3	4	5	6	7	8	9	10	Final
Japan (Fujisawa)	3	0	2	0	4	0	1	X	X	X	10
Scotland (Muirhead)	0	1	0	2	0	1	0	X	X	X	4

Sheet D	1	2	3	4	5	6	7	8	9	10	Final
Russia (Sidorova)	3	0	1	0	2	0	1	1	X	X	8
Germany (Driendl)	0	0	0	1	0	2	0	0	X	X	3

=== Draw 16 ===
Thursday, March 24, 14:00

Sheet A	1	2	3	4	5	6	7	8	9	10	Final
Switzerland (Feltscher)	2	0	0	0	0	2	0	0	0	1	5
Italy (Apollonio)	0	0	0	2	1	0	0	0	1	0	4

Sheet B	1	2	3	4	5	6	7	8	9	10	Final
United States (Brown)	0	2	1	0	1	2	0	2	0	X	8
Finland (Kauste)	0	0	0	2	0	0	1	0	0	X	3

Sheet C	1	2	3	4	5	6	7	8	9	10	11	Final
Denmark (Nielsen)	2	0	1	0	1	0	1	1	0	1	0	7
Russia (Sidorova)	0	1	0	2	0	2	0	0	1	0	3	10

Sheet D	1	2	3	4	5	6	7	8	9	10	Final
Canada (Carey)	0	0	1	0	1	0	X	X	X	X	2
Japan (Fujisawa)	2	2	0	2	0	5	X	X	X	X	11

=== Draw 17 ===
Thursday, March 24, 19:00

Sheet A	1	2	3	4	5	6	7	8	9	10	Final
Germany (Driendl)	0	0	0	2	1	0	0	0	1	X	4
Denmark (Nielsen)	0	0	2	0	0	1	3	2	0	X	8

Sheet B	1	2	3	4	5	6	7	8	9	10	Final
Scotland (Muirhead)	0	1	0	0	1	0	1	1	0	X	4
Canada (Carey)	1	0	1	0	0	3	0	0	4	X	9

Sheet C	1	2	3	4	5	6	7	8	9	10	Final
South Korea (Kim)	2	0	0	0	0	1	0	1	0	1	5
Switzerland (Feltscher)	0	1	0	1	1	0	1	0	3	0	7

Sheet D	1	2	3	4	5	6	7	8	9	10	11	Final
Sweden (Sigfridsson)	0	1	0	1	0	1	0	0	0	1	0	4
United States (Brown)	0	0	1	0	1	0	0	2	0	0	1	5

== Playoffs ==
Page playoff system
1	Switzerland	8
2	Japan	4
3	Russia	7
4	Canada	4

Semifinal
2	Japan	7
3	Russia	5

Final
1	Switzerland	9
2	Japan	6

Bronze Medal Game
4	Canada	8
3	Russia	9

=== 1 vs. 2 ===
Friday, March 25, 19:00

Sheet C	1	2	3	4	5	6	7	8	9	10	Final
Switzerland (Feltscher)	1	1	0	1	0	0	3	0	2	X	8
Japan (Fujisawa)	0	0	1	0	1	1	0	1	0	X	4

Player percentages
Switzerland		Japan	
Christine Urech	78%	Yurika Yoshida	90%
Franziska Kaufmann	86%	Yumi Suzuki	75%
Irene Schori	86%	Chinami Yoshida	74%
Binia Feltscher	89%	Satsuki Fujisawa	71%
Total	85%	Total	77%

=== 3 vs. 4 ===
Saturday, March 26, 14:00

Sheet C	1	2	3	4	5	6	7	8	9	10	Final
Russia (Sidorova)	0	2	2	0	1	0	0	2	0	X	7
Canada (Carey)	0	0	0	1	0	0	2	0	1	X	4

Player percentages
Russia		Canada	
Nkeiruka Ezekh	88%	Laine Peters	76%
Alexandra Raeva	95%	Jocelyn Peterman	83%
Margarita Fomina	88%	Amy Nixon	88%
Anna Sidorova	94%	Chelsea Carey	67%
Total	91%	Total	79%

=== Semifinal ===
Saturday, March 26, 19:00

Sheet C	1	2	3	4	5	6	7	8	9	10	11	Final
Russia (Sidorova)	0	0	0	0	1	0	2	0	0	2	0	5
Japan (Fujisawa)	0	0	0	1	0	2	0	1	1	0	2	7

Player percentages
Russia		Japan	
Nkeiruka Ezekh	93%	Yurika Yoshida	85%
Alexandra Raeva	76%	Yumi Suzuki	88%
Margarita Fomina	91%	Chinami Yoshida	82%
Anna Sidorova	82%	Satsuki Fujisawa	93%
Total	86%	Total	87%

=== Bronze medal game ===
Sunday, March 27, 10:00

Sheet C	1	2	3	4	5	6	7	8	9	10	Final
Canada (Carey)	0	2	0	0	0	2	2	0	2	0	8
Russia (Sidorova)	2	0	1	1	1	0	0	3	0	1	9

Player percentages
Canada		Russia	
Laine Peters	91%	Nkeiruka Ezekh	76%
Jocelyn Peterman	88%	Alexandra Raeva	89%
Amy Nixon	84%	Margarita Fomina	76%
Chelsea Carey	73%	Anna Sidorova	76%
Total	84%	Total	79%

=== Final ===
Sunday, March 27, 15:00

Sheet C	1	2	3	4	5	6	7	8	9	10	Final
Switzerland (Feltscher)	0	1	0	0	1	0	3	0	2	2	9
Japan (Fujisawa)	0	0	0	1	0	2	0	3	0	0	6

Player percentages
Switzerland		Japan	
Christine Urech	88%	Yurika Yoshida	90%
Franziska Kaufmann	86%	Yumi Suzuki	90%
Irene Schori	76%	Chinami Yoshida	88%
Binia Feltscher	89%	Satsuki Fujisawa	84%
Total	85%	Total	88%

2016 Ford World Women's Curling Championship winner
(Switzerland)
Switzerland
6th title

== Statistics ==
=== Top 5 player percentages ===
Final Round Robin Percentages

Leads	%
(South Korea) Kim Ji-sun (Skip)	90
(Sweden) Margaretha Sigfridsson (Skip)	88
(Scotland) Sarah Reid	88
(Germany) Pia-Lisa Schöll	87
(Canada) Laine Peters	86

Seconds	%
(Japan) Yumi Suzuki	87
(Scotland) Vicki Adams	87
(Switzerland) Franziska Kaufmann	87
(South Korea) Lee Seul-bee	86
(Canada) Jocelyn Peterman	85

Thirds	%
(Japan) Chinami Yoshida	90
(Switzerland) Irene Schori	88
(Russia) Margarita Fomina	86
(United States) Allison Pottinger	85
(Canada) Amy Nixon	82

Skips	%
(Japan) Satsuki Fujisawa	86
(Scotland) Eve Muirhead	85
(Canada) Chelsea Carey	82
(United States) Erika Brown	82
(Russia) Anna Sidorova	80

=== Perfect games ===
Player	Team	Position	Opponent
Satsuki Fujisawa	Japan	Skip	Italy
Kim Ji-sun	South Korea	Lead (Skip)	United States
Chinami Yoshida	Japan	Third	Germany
