= Smilga =

Smilga may refer to:

- Smilga (river), Lithuania

== Surname ==
- Ivan Smilga (Jānis Smilga) (1898-1918), Soviet Latvian soldier buried in the Kremlin Wall Necropolis
- Ivar Smilga (1892–1938), Soviet Bolshevik leader
- Kārlis Smilga (born 1975), Latvian curler
- Vineta Smilga, Latvian curler, see 2010 European Curling Championships – Women's tournament
