= 2012 World Junior Curling Championships =

- Host city: Östersund, Sweden
- Arena: Z-Hallen
- Dates: March 3–11
- Men's winner: Canada
- Skip: Brendan Bottcher
- Third: Evan Asmussen
- Second: Landon Bucholz
- Lead: Bryce Bucholz
- Alternate: Parker Konschuh
- Finalist: Sweden (Rasmus Wranå)
- Women's winner: Scotland
- Skip: Hannah Fleming
- Third: Lauren Gray
- Second: Alice Spence
- Lead: Abigail Brown
- Alternate: Jennifer Martin
- Finalist: Czech Republic (Zuzana Hájková)

The 2012 World Junior Curling Championships was held from March 3 to 11 at the Z-Hallen in Östersund, Sweden. Östersund previously hosted the World Junior Curling Championships in 1999 and in 2008.

In the men's final, Canada's Brendan Bottcher defeated Sweden's Rasmus Wranå in eight ends with a score of 10–4. Scotland's Kyle Smith secured the men's bronze medal with a 7–3 win over Norway's Markus Høiberg. In the women's final, Scotland's Hannah Fleming defeated the Czech Republic's Zuzana Hájková in an extra end with a score of 6–5. Russia's Anna Sidorova won over Sweden's Sara McManus in nine ends to win the women's bronze medal with a score of 7–4.

Canadian women's skip Jocelyn Peterman and Norwegian men's lead Sander Rølvåg were awarded with the 2012 World Curling Federation World Junior Sportsmanship Awards. They were chosen by fellow players at the World Junior Championships based on their values of sportsmanship and fair play.

As the last placed European teams, three teams, Italy on the women's side and Italy and Finland on the men's side, will be relegated to the 2013 European Junior Curling Challenge, where teams not already qualified for the 2013 World Junior Curling Championships will have to play to qualify for the worlds.

== Men ==
=== Teams ===
Canada, the Czech Republic, Finland, Norway, Scotland, Sweden, Switzerland, and the United States qualified by virtue of their performance at last year's championships. Italy qualified from the European Junior Curling Challenge, and China qualified from the Pacific Junior Curling Championships.

The teams are listed as follows:

Country	Skip	Third	Second	Lead	Alternate
Canada	Brendan Bottcher	Evan Asmussen	Landon Bucholz	Bryce Bucholz	Parker Konschuh
China	Ma Xiuyue	Xiao Shicheng	Jiang Dongxu	Shao Zhilin	Zhang Zhongbao
Czech Republic	Lukas Klima	Marek Černovský	Jan Zelingr	Samuel Mokris	Jakub Splavec
Finland	Iiro Sipola	Esko Sinisalo	Niklas Malmi	Kim Malmi	
Italy	Andrea Pilzer	Amos Mosaner	Daniele Ferrazza	Roberto Arman	Sebastiano Arman
Norway	Markus Høiberg	Magnus Nedregotten	Sebastian Mellemseter	Sander Rølvåg	Eirik Mjøen
Scotland	Kyle Smith	Thomas Muirhead	Kyle Waddell	Kerr Drummond	Hammy McMillan Jr.
Sweden	Rasmus Wranå	Jordan Wåhlin	Daniel Lövstrand	Axel Sjöberg	Patric Mabergs
Switzerland	Dominik Märki	Daniel Schifferli	Päddy Käser	Raphael Märki	Benoît Schwarz
United States	Stephen Dropkin	Korey Dropkin	Thomas Howell	Derek Corbett	Cameron Ross

=== Round Robin Standings ===
Final Round Robin Standings

Key
Teams to Playoffs

Country	Skip	W	L
Canada	Brendan Bottcher	8	1
Sweden	Rasmus Wranå	7	2
Scotland	Kyle Smith	7	2
Norway	Markus Høiberg	6	3
United States	Stephen Dropkin	5	4
Switzerland	Dominik Märki	5	4
China	Ma Xiuyue	4	5
Czech Republic	Lukas Klima	2	7
Italy	Andrea Pilzer	1	8
Finland	Iiro Sipola	0	9

=== Round-robin results ===
All draw times are listed in Central European Time (UTC+01).

==== Draw 1 ====
Saturday, March 3, 14:00

Sheet A	1	2	3	4	5	6	7	8	9	10	Final
Italy (Pilzer)	0	1	0	0	1	0	0	X	X	X	2
United States (Dropkin) 🔨	2	0	3	0	0	3	1	X	X	X	9

Sheet B	1	2	3	4	5	6	7	8	9	10	Final
Czech Republic (Klima) 🔨	0	1	0	1	0	1	0	1	0	X	4
Switzerland (Märki)	0	0	2	0	3	0	3	0	1	X	9

Sheet C	1	2	3	4	5	6	7	8	9	10	Final
Sweden (Wranå)	3	0	0	2	3	1	X	X	X	X	9
Norway (Høiberg) 🔨	0	2	0	0	0	0	X	X	X	X	2

Sheet D	1	2	3	4	5	6	7	8	9	10	Final
China (Ma) 🔨	0	0	0	0	1	0	2	0	1	X	4
Canada (Bottcher)	0	1	1	0	0	5	0	1	0	X	8

Sheet E	1	2	3	4	5	6	7	8	9	10	Final
Scotland (Smith)	0	2	0	2	1	2	0	0	X	X	7
Finland (Sipola) 🔨	1	0	1	0	0	0	0	1	X	X	3

==== Draw 2 ====
Sunday, March 4, 9:00

Sheet A	1	2	3	4	5	6	7	8	9	10	11	Final
Switzerland (Märki)	0	2	0	0	0	0	2	0	1	1	0	6
China (Ma) 🔨	1	0	0	0	4	0	0	1	0	0	1	7

Sheet B	1	2	3	4	5	6	7	8	9	10	11	Final
United States (Dropkin) 🔨	2	0	1	1	0	1	0	0	0	1	0	6
Canada (Bottcher)	0	2	0	0	2	0	1	1	0	0	3	9

Sheet C	1	2	3	4	5	6	7	8	9	10	11	Final
Scotland (Smith)	0	0	2	0	0	2	0	0	0	1	1	6
Italy (Pilzer) 🔨	0	1	0	0	2	0	2	0	0	0	0	5

Sheet D	1	2	3	4	5	6	7	8	9	10	Final
Finland (Sipola)	0	1	0	2	0	2	0	1	2	0	8
Norway (Høiberg) 🔨	2	0	2	0	1	0	2	0	0	2	9

Sheet E	1	2	3	4	5	6	7	8	9	10	Final
Czech Republic (Klima)	0	0	0	1	1	0	1	0	2	0	5
Sweden (Wranå) 🔨	0	0	3	0	0	3	0	1	0	1	8

==== Draw 3 ====
Sunday, March 4, 19:00

Sheet A	1	2	3	4	5	6	7	8	9	10	Final
Norway (Høiberg)	0	0	0	5	0	1	0	4	X	X	10
Czech Republic (Klima) 🔨	0	1	0	0	2	0	1	0	X	X	4

Sheet B	1	2	3	4	5	6	7	8	9	10	11	Final
Italy (Pilzer) 🔨	2	0	1	2	2	0	0	0	1	0	1	9
Finland (Sipola)	0	2	0	0	0	1	1	1	0	3	0	8

Sheet C	1	2	3	4	5	6	7	8	9	10	Final
United States (Dropkin)	0	2	2	0	0	1	0	0	0	1	6
China (Ma) 🔨	3	0	0	1	0	0	0	1	0	0	5

Sheet D	1	2	3	4	5	6	7	8	9	10	11	Final
Sweden (Wranå)	0	0	0	0	0	0	1	0	0	2	1	4
Scotland (Smith) 🔨	0	2	0	0	0	0	0	1	0	0	0	3

Sheet E	1	2	3	4	5	6	7	8	9	10	Final
Switzerland (Märki)	1	0	1	0	2	0	0	1	1	0	6
Canada (Bottcher) 🔨	0	2	0	3	0	0	1	0	0	1	7

==== Draw 4 ====
Monday, March 5, 14:00

Sheet A	1	2	3	4	5	6	7	8	9	10	Final
Canada (Bottcher)	0	0	1	1	0	0	0	2	0	X	4
Scotland (Smith) 🔨	0	1	0	0	1	3	1	0	2	X	8

Sheet B	1	2	3	4	5	6	7	8	9	10	Final
Sweden (Wranå) 🔨	0	2	0	3	0	3	0	0	X	X	8
China (Ma)	1	0	0	0	1	0	1	1	X	X	4

Sheet C	1	2	3	4	5	6	7	8	9	10	Final
Finland (Sipola) 🔨	1	0	0	1	0	1	2	0	1	X	6
Switzerland (Märki)	0	0	2	0	4	0	0	2	0	X	8

Sheet D	1	2	3	4	5	6	7	8	9	10	Final
Norway (Høiberg) 🔨	3	0	2	0	2	0	2	X	X	X	9
Italy (Pilzer)	0	1	0	1	0	1	0	X	X	X	3

Sheet E	1	2	3	4	5	6	7	8	9	10	Final
United States (Dropkin) 🔨	2	0	3	0	0	0	4	1	X	X	10
Czech Republic (Klima)	0	2	0	0	1	0	0	0	X	X	3

==== Draw 5 ====
Tuesday, March 6, 9:00

Sheet A	1	2	3	4	5	6	7	8	9	10	Final
Sweden (Wranå)	0	0	1	0	1	1	0	0	1	0	4
Switzerland (Märki) 🔨	2	3	0	0	0	0	0	1	0	1	7

Sheet B	1	2	3	4	5	6	7	8	9	10	Final
Scotland (Smith) 🔨	3	0	2	1	0	4	0	0	1	X	11
United States (Dropkin)	0	3	0	0	3	0	2	0	0	X	8

Sheet C	1	2	3	4	5	6	7	8	9	10	Final
Italy (Pilzer)	0	0	1	0	0	1	X	X	X	X	2
Canada (Bottcher) 🔨	2	1	0	2	3	0	X	X	X	X	8

Sheet D	1	2	3	4	5	6	7	8	9	10	11	Final
Czech Republic (Klima) 🔨	1	0	1	0	0	4	0	0	0	0	1	7
Finland (Sipola)	0	0	0	1	1	0	2	0	1	1	0	6

Sheet E	1	2	3	4	5	6	7	8	9	10	Final
China (Ma) 🔨	1	0	1	0	0	1	0	0	2	0	5
Norway (Høiberg)	0	2	0	1	0	0	0	3	0	1	7

==== Draw 6 ====
Tuesday, March 6, 19:00

Sheet A	1	2	3	4	5	6	7	8	9	10	Final
Scotland (Smith) 🔨	0	0	0	1	0	0	1	0	1	X	3
Norway (Høiberg)	0	0	0	0	0	1	0	5	0	X	6

Sheet B	1	2	3	4	5	6	7	8	9	10	Final
Switzerland (Märki)	1	2	0	2	0	1	0	2	X	X	8
Italy (Pilzer) 🔨	0	0	1	0	1	0	1	0	X	X	3

Sheet C	1	2	3	4	5	6	7	8	9	10	Final
China (Ma)	0	0	1	1	0	0	6	X	X	X	8
Czech Republic (Klima) 🔨	0	1	0	0	2	0	0	X	X	X	3

Sheet D	1	2	3	4	5	6	7	8	9	10	Final
Canada (Bottcher)	0	1	1	0	1	1	0	1	0	X	5
Sweden (Wranå) 🔨	0	0	0	1	0	0	1	0	0	X	2

Sheet E	1	2	3	4	5	6	7	8	9	10	Final
Finland (Sipola)	1	0	1	0	0	0	0	1	0	X	3
United States (Dropkin) 🔨	0	2	0	2	0	2	0	0	1	X	7

==== Draw 7 ====
Wednesday, March 7, 14:00

Sheet A	1	2	3	4	5	6	7	8	9	10	Final
Czech Republic (Klima)	0	0	1	0	1	1	0	2	0	X	5
Canada (Bottcher) 🔨	1	2	0	2	0	0	2	0	2	X	9

Sheet B	1	2	3	4	5	6	7	8	9	10	Final
Finland (Sipola)	0	1	0	0	0	2	0	1	0	X	4
Sweden (Wranå) 🔨	2	0	0	3	1	0	1	0	1	X	8

Sheet C	1	2	3	4	5	6	7	8	9	10	11	Final
Norway (Høiberg) 🔨	1	0	0	3	0	2	0	0	0	0	1	7
United States (Dropkin)	0	1	0	0	2	0	0	0	2	1	0	6

Sheet D	1	2	3	4	5	6	7	8	9	10	Final
Scotland (Smith)	0	2	1	0	2	0	0	0	3	0	8
Switzerland (Märki) 🔨	2	0	0	2	0	0	0	1	0	1	6

Sheet E	1	2	3	4	5	6	7	8	9	10	11	Final
Italy (Pilzer) 🔨	2	0	2	0	0	2	0	0	1	0	0	6
China (Ma)	0	2	0	1	0	0	1	1	0	2	1	7

==== Draw 8 ====
Thursday, March 8, 8:00

Sheet A	1	2	3	4	5	6	7	8	9	10	Final
United States (Dropkin)	0	0	0	1	1	0	1	1	0	X	4
Sweden (Wranå) 🔨	0	1	3	0	0	2	0	0	2	X	8

Sheet B	1	2	3	4	5	6	7	8	9	10	Final
China (Ma)	1	0	0	0	0	0	0	1	X	X	2
Scotland (Smith) 🔨	0	2	1	1	0	2	0	0	X	X	6

Sheet C	1	2	3	4	5	6	7	8	9	10	Final
Canada (Bottcher) 🔨	3	0	3	1	0	2	X	X	X	X	9
Finland (Sipola)	0	1	0	0	1	0	X	X	X	X	2

Sheet D	1	2	3	4	5	6	7	8	9	10	Final
Italy (Pilzer) 🔨	0	0	3	0	0	2	0	X	X	X	5
Czech Republic (Klima)	2	1	0	2	2	0	4	X	X	X	11

Sheet E	1	2	3	4	5	6	7	8	9	10	Final
Norway (Høiberg) 🔨	0	1	0	1	0	0	X	X	X	X	2
Switzerland (Märki)	1	0	3	0	2	3	X	X	X	X	9

==== Draw 9 ====
Thursday, March 8, 17:00

Sheet A	1	2	3	4	5	6	7	8	9	10	11	Final
China (Ma)	1	0	0	2	0	1	0	1	4	0	1	10
Finland (Sipola) 🔨	0	4	1	0	3	0	0	0	0	1	0	9

Sheet B	1	2	3	4	5	6	7	8	9	10	Final
Canada (Bottcher)	0	3	0	0	0	2	0	2	0	3	10
Norway (Høiberg) 🔨	2	0	0	0	1	0	2	0	2	0	7

Sheet C	1	2	3	4	5	6	7	8	9	10	Final
Czech Republic (Klima)	0	2	0	0	0	2	0	X	X	X	4
Scotland (Smith) 🔨	2	0	0	2	0	0	5	X	X	X	9

Sheet D	1	2	3	4	5	6	7	8	9	10	11	Final
Switzerland (Märki)	0	1	0	3	0	0	2	1	0	0	0	7
United States (Dropkin) 🔨	1	0	2	0	0	3	0	0	0	1	1	8

Sheet E	1	2	3	4	5	6	7	8	9	10	Final
Sweden (Wranå)	0	3	4	0	4	0	X	X	X	X	11
Italy (Pilzer) 🔨	1	0	0	2	0	0	X	X	X	X	3

=== Playoffs ===
Page playoff system
1	Canada	9
2	Sweden	3
3	Scotland	8
4	Norway	9

Semifinal
2	Sweden	8
4	Norway	4

Gold-medal game
1	Canada	10
2	Sweden	4

Bronze-medal game
4	Norway	3
3	Scotland	7

==== 1 vs. 2 Game ====
Saturday, March 10, 12:00

Sheet C	1	2	3	4	5	6	7	8	9	10	Final
Canada (Bottcher) 🔨	2	0	1	0	3	0	3	0	X	X	9
Sweden (Wranå)	0	1	0	1	0	1	0	0	X	X	3

==== 3 vs. 4 Game ====
Saturday, March 10, 12:00

Sheet B	1	2	3	4	5	6	7	8	9	10	Final
Scotland (Smith) 🔨	0	3	0	0	3	0	0	1	1	0	8
Norway (Høiberg)	1	0	2	3	0	2	0	0	0	1	9

==== Semifinal ====
Saturday, March 10, 18:00

Sheet D	1	2	3	4	5	6	7	8	9	10	Final
Sweden (Wranå) 🔨	0	1	0	4	1	0	1	0	1	X	8
Norway (Høiberg)	0	0	1	0	0	1	0	2	0	X	4

==== Bronze-medal game ====
Sunday, March 11, 13:00

Sheet B	1	2	3	4	5	6	7	8	9	10	Final
Norway (Høiberg) 🔨	0	0	1	0	0	1	0	1	X	X	3
Scotland (Smith)	1	1	0	1	1	0	3	0	X	X	7

==== Gold-medal game ====
Sunday, March 11, 13:00

Sheet C	1	2	3	4	5	6	7	8	9	10	Final
Canada (Bottcher) 🔨	1	0	2	0	2	0	5	0	X	X	10
Sweden (Wranå)	0	1	0	1	0	1	0	1	X	X	4

2012 World Junior Men's Curling Championship
(Canada)
Canada
17th title

== Women ==
=== Teams ===
Canada, the Czech Republic, Norway, Russia, Scotland, Sweden, Switzerland, and the United States qualified by virtue of their performance at last year's championships. Italy qualified from the European Junior Curling Challenge, and Japan qualified from the Pacific Junior Curling Championships.

The teams are listed as follows:

Country	Skip	Third	Second	Lead	Alternate
Canada	Jocelyn Peterman	Brittany Tran	Rebecca Konschuh	Kristine Anderson	Nadine Chyz
Czech Republic	Iveta Janatová (fourth)	Zuzana Hájková (skip)	Klára Svatoňová	Eva Malková	Petra Vinšová
Italy	Federica Apollonio	Giada Mosaner	Chiara Zanotelli	Stefania Menardi	Anastasia Mosca
Japan	Sayaka Yoshimura	Rina Ida	Risa Ujihara	Mao Ishigaki	Natsuo Ishiyama
Norway	Kristine Davanger	Pia Trulsen	Nora Hilding	Julie Kjær Molnar	Ingvild Skaga
Russia	Anna Sidorova	Olga Zyablikova	Victoria Moiseeva	Galina Arsenkina	Alexandra Saitova
Scotland	Hannah Fleming	Lauren Gray	Alice Spence	Abigail Brown	Jennifer Martin
Sweden	Sara McManus	Anna Huhta	Marina Stener	Sofia Mabergs	Rosalie Egli
Switzerland	Melanie Barbezat	Briar Hürlimann	Mara Gautschi	Janine Wyss	Nadine Lehmann
United States	Cory Christensen	Elizabeth Busche	Anna Bauman	Sonja Bauman	Rebecca Funk

=== Round Robin Standings ===
Final Round Robin Standings

Key
Teams to Playoffs
Teams to Tiebreakers

Country	Skip	W	L
Scotland	Hannah Fleming	7	2
Czech Republic	Zuzana Hájková	6	3
Russia	Anna Sidorova	6	3
Sweden	Sara McManus	6	3
Japan	Sayaka Yoshimura	6	3
Canada	Jocelyn Peterman	6	3
Norway	Kristine Davanger	3	6
Switzerland	Melanie Barbezat	3	6
Italy	Federica Apollonio	2	7
United States	Cory Christensen	0	9

=== Round-robin results ===
All draw times are listed in Central European Time (UTC+01).

==== Draw 1 ====
Saturday, March 3, 9:00

Sheet A	1	2	3	4	5	6	7	8	9	10	Final
Czech Republic (Hájková)	0	3	3	0	2	2	X	X	X	X	10
Canada (Peterman) 🔨	1	0	0	2	0	0	X	X	X	X	3

Sheet B	1	2	3	4	5	6	7	8	9	10	Final
Italy (Apollonio)	0	1	0	1	0	0	X	X	X	X	2
Sweden (McManus) 🔨	3	0	2	0	4	1	X	X	X	X	10

Sheet C	1	2	3	4	5	6	7	8	9	10	Final
Japan (Yoshimura)	0	1	0	0	1	0	1	0	0	X	3
Russia (Sidorova) 🔨	2	0	2	1	0	2	0	2	2	X	11

Sheet D	1	2	3	4	5	6	7	8	9	10	Final
Norway (Davanger) 🔨	1	0	0	1	1	0	0	0	X	X	3
Scotland (Fleming)	0	0	2	0	0	4	2	1	X	X	9

Sheet E	1	2	3	4	5	6	7	8	9	10	Final
United States (Christensen) 🔨	2	0	0	0	1	0	1	0	1	X	5
Switzerland (Barbezat)	0	2	1	1	0	3	0	2	0	X	9

==== Draw 2 ====
Saturday, March 3, 19:00

Sheet A	1	2	3	4	5	6	7	8	9	10	Final
Sweden (McManus) 🔨	2	3	0	1	0	0	1	2	X	X	9
Norway (Davanger)	0	0	3	0	1	0	0	0	X	X	4

Sheet B	1	2	3	4	5	6	7	8	9	10	Final
Canada (Peterman)	0	0	2	0	1	0	2	1	0	1	7
Scotland (Fleming) 🔨	1	1	0	1	0	1	0	0	1	0	5

Sheet C	1	2	3	4	5	6	7	8	9	10	Final
United States (Christensen) 🔨	0	0	2	1	0	1	0	0	0	X	4
Czech Republic (Hájková)	1	3	0	0	1	0	0	2	1	X	8

Sheet D	1	2	3	4	5	6	7	8	9	10	Final
Switzerland (Barbezat) 🔨	0	1	0	1	0	2	0	2	2	0	8
Russia (Sidorova)	0	0	4	0	2	0	3	0	0	1	10

Sheet E	1	2	3	4	5	6	7	8	9	10	Final
Italy (Apollonio) 🔨	1	0	0	0	0	1	1	0	1	0	4
Japan (Yoshimura)	0	2	0	0	0	0	0	1	0	3	6

==== Draw 3 ====
Sunday, March 4, 14:00

Sheet A	1	2	3	4	5	6	7	8	9	10	Final
Russia (Sidorova) 🔨	2	3	0	2	0	0	1	0	2	1	11
Italy (Apollonio)	0	0	4	0	1	3	0	1	0	0	9

Sheet B	1	2	3	4	5	6	7	8	9	10	Final
Czech Republic (Hájková) 🔨	0	2	0	1	0	2	0	0	0	0	5
Switzerland (Barbezat)	2	0	1	0	2	0	0	0	0	1	6

Sheet C	1	2	3	4	5	6	7	8	9	10	Final
Canada (Peterman) 🔨	3	1	1	0	3	0	2	X	X	X	10
Norway (Davanger)	0	0	0	1	0	2	0	X	X	X	3

Sheet D	1	2	3	4	5	6	7	8	9	10	Final
Japan (Yoshimura)	0	1	0	2	1	1	0	0	2	X	7
United States (Christensen) 🔨	1	0	1	0	0	0	0	2	0	X	4

Sheet E	1	2	3	4	5	6	7	8	9	10	11	Final
Sweden (McManus)	0	0	2	0	1	0	4	0	0	0	0	7
Scotland (Fleming) 🔨	2	0	0	1	0	2	0	1	0	1	1	8

==== Draw 4 ====
Monday, March 5, 9:00

Sheet A	1	2	3	4	5	6	7	8	9	10	11	Final
Scotland (Fleming) 🔨	1	3	0	0	0	0	0	2	1	0	1	8
United States (Christensen)	0	0	1	1	0	1	1	0	0	3	0	7

Sheet B	1	2	3	4	5	6	7	8	9	10	Final
Japan (Yoshimura) 🔨	0	0	0	2	0	2	0	0	5	X	9
Norway (Davanger)	2	0	0	0	1	0	1	1	0	X	5

Sheet C	1	2	3	4	5	6	7	8	9	10	Final
Switzerland (Barbezat)	0	1	0	0	1	0	X	X	X	X	2
Sweden (McManus) 🔨	2	0	3	2	0	2	X	X	X	X	9

Sheet D	1	2	3	4	5	6	7	8	9	10	Final
Russia (Sidorova) 🔨	1	0	0	2	0	2	0	1	0	0	6
Czech Republic (Hájková)	0	0	0	0	1	0	3	0	1	2	7

Sheet E	1	2	3	4	5	6	7	8	9	10	Final
Canada (Peterman) 🔨	1	5	0	4	1	0	X	X	X	X	11
Italy (Apollonio)	0	0	1	0	0	2	X	X	X	X	3

==== Draw 5 ====
Monday, March 5, 19:00

Sheet A	1	2	3	4	5	6	7	8	9	10	Final
Japan (Yoshimura)	0	2	0	0	1	0	2	0	1	0	6
Sweden (McManus) 🔨	1	0	0	1	0	2	0	1	0	2	7

Sheet B	1	2	3	4	5	6	7	8	9	10	Final
United States (Christensen)	0	0	0	1	0	0	1	0	2	X	4
Canada (Peterman) 🔨	1	2	1	0	1	1	0	2	0	X	8

Sheet C	1	2	3	4	5	6	7	8	9	10	Final
Czech Republic (Hájková)	0	1	0	0	1	0	0	1	X	X	3
Scotland (Fleming) 🔨	2	0	0	1	0	3	2	0	X	X	8

Sheet D	1	2	3	4	5	6	7	8	9	10	Final
Italy (Apollonio)	0	1	0	2	2	0	0	0	0	2	7
Switzerland (Barbezat) 🔨	3	0	1	0	0	0	1	1	0	0	6

Sheet E	1	2	3	4	5	6	7	8	9	10	Final
Norway (Davanger)	0	1	0	0	1	0	1	0	X	X	3
Russia (Sidorova) 🔨	2	0	2	0	0	1	0	5	X	X	10

==== Draw 6 ====
Tuesday, March 6, 14:00

Sheet A	1	2	3	4	5	6	7	8	9	10	Final
United States (Christensen)	0	0	0	1	0	0	2	1	0	X	4
Russia (Sidorova) 🔨	0	1	1	0	2	1	0	0	1	X	6

Sheet B	1	2	3	4	5	6	7	8	9	10	Final
Sweden (McManus) 🔨	0	0	0	3	0	1	0	2	2	0	8
Czech Republic (Hájková)	1	1	1	0	2	0	2	0	0	2	9

Sheet C	1	2	3	4	5	6	7	8	9	10	Final
Norway (Davanger)	0	2	1	0	1	1	0	3	0	X	8
Italy (Apollonio) 🔨	2	0	0	0	0	0	1	0	1	X	4

Sheet D	1	2	3	4	5	6	7	8	9	10	Final
Scotland (Fleming) 🔨	3	0	0	1	1	0	1	0	0	1	7
Japan (Yoshimura)	0	1	1	0	0	1	0	1	1	0	5

Sheet E	1	2	3	4	5	6	7	8	9	10	Final
Switzerland (Barbezat) 🔨	0	1	0	2	0	1	0	X	X	X	4
Canada (Peterman)	3	0	4	0	2	0	2	X	X	X	11

==== Draw 7 ====
Wednesday, March 7, 9:00

Sheet A	1	2	3	4	5	6	7	8	9	10	Final
Italy (Apollonio) 🔨	0	0	1	0	0	1	1	1	0	0	4
Scotland (Fleming)	0	0	0	3	1	0	0	0	0	1	5

Sheet B	1	2	3	4	5	6	7	8	9	10	Final
Switzerland (Barbezat)	1	0	2	0	0	0	0	1	0	X	4
Japan (Yoshimura) 🔨	0	2	0	1	1	2	1	0	3	X	10

Sheet C	1	2	3	4	5	6	7	8	9	10	Final
Russia (Sidorova)	0	1	0	1	1	0	1	0	2	0	6
Canada (Peterman) 🔨	1	0	3	0	0	2	0	3	0	1	10

Sheet D	1	2	3	4	5	6	7	8	9	10	Final
United States (Christensen) 🔨	1	0	1	0	0	0	3	0	0	X	5
Sweden (McManus)	0	4	0	0	3	0	0	1	3	X	11

Sheet E	1	2	3	4	5	6	7	8	9	10	Final
Czech Republic (Hájková) 🔨	2	0	0	3	0	0	0	3	3	X	11
Norway (Davanger)	0	1	0	0	2	0	1	0	0	X	4

==== Draw 8 ====
Wednesday, March 7, 19:00

Sheet A	1	2	3	4	5	6	7	8	9	10	Final
Canada (Peterman)	0	2	1	1	1	0	0	0	1	0	6
Japan (Yoshimura) 🔨	2	0	0	0	0	2	0	1	0	2	7

Sheet B	1	2	3	4	5	6	7	8	9	10	Final
Norway (Davanger)	0	0	2	0	3	0	4	0	0	0	9
United States (Christensen) 🔨	1	1	0	1	0	1	0	2	1	1	8

Sheet C	1	2	3	4	5	6	7	8	9	10	Final
Scotland (Fleming) 🔨	1	0	0	1	0	1	0	0	2	0	5
Switzerland (Barbezat)	0	2	1	0	1	0	1	1	0	1	7

Sheet D	1	2	3	4	5	6	7	8	9	10	Final
Czech Republic (Hájková)	0	0	0	1	1	1	0	2	0	1	6
Italy (Apollonio) 🔨	0	0	2	0	0	0	1	0	2	0	5

Sheet E	1	2	3	4	5	6	7	8	9	10	Final
Russia (Sidorova) 🔨	0	1	0	1	0	4	0	3	0	X	9
Sweden (McManus)	0	0	2	0	1	0	2	0	2	X	7

==== Draw 9 ====
Thursday, March 8, 12:30

Sheet A	1	2	3	4	5	6	7	8	9	10	Final
Norway (Davanger) 🔨	2	1	0	1	2	0	2	0	0	X	8
Switzerland (Barbezat)	0	0	1	0	0	1	0	2	1	X	5

Sheet B	1	2	3	4	5	6	7	8	9	10	11	Final
Scotland (Fleming)	0	3	0	2	0	0	1	0	1	0	1	8
Russia (Sidorova) 🔨	1	0	2	0	1	1	0	1	0	1	0	7

Sheet C	1	2	3	4	5	6	7	8	9	10	Final
Italy (Apollonio)	0	0	1	0	1	0	3	2	0	X	7
United States (Christensen) 🔨	1	0	0	2	0	1	0	0	1	X	5

Sheet D	1	2	3	4	5	6	7	8	9	10	Final
Sweden (McManus)	0	1	0	2	0	0	2	1	0	1	7
Canada (Peterman) 🔨	1	0	1	0	0	2	0	0	1	0	5

Sheet E	1	2	3	4	5	6	7	8	9	10	Final
Japan (Yoshimura) 🔨	0	1	0	2	1	0	2	0	2	X	8
Czech Republic (Hájková)	0	0	3	0	0	1	0	1	0	X	5

=== Tiebreakers ===
Friday, March 9, 9:00

Third-place game

Sheet C	1	2	3	4	5	6	7	8	9	10	Final
Canada (Peterman) 🔨	1	0	2	0	0	1	2	0	3	1	10
Russia (Sidorova)	0	4	0	3	1	0	0	3	0	0	11

Fourth-place game

Sheet A	1	2	3	4	5	6	7	8	9	10	Final
Japan (Yoshimura)	0	2	0	0	1	0	0	1	0	X	4
Sweden (McManus) 🔨	1	0	0	3	0	0	1	0	1	X	6

=== Playoffs ===
Page playoff system
1	Scotland	6
2	Czech Republic	5
3	Russia	5
4	Sweden	6

Semifinal
2	Czech Republic	6
4	Sweden	5

Gold-medal game
1	Scotland	6
2	Czech Republic	5

Bronze-medal game
4	Sweden	4
3	Russia	7

==== 1 vs. 2 Game ====
Friday, March 9, 19:00

Sheet C	1	2	3	4	5	6	7	8	9	10	Final
Scotland (Fleming) 🔨	0	3	0	1	0	1	0	1	0	0	6
Czech Republic (Hájková)	1	0	0	0	2	0	1	0	1	0	5

==== 3 vs. 4 Game ====
Friday, March 9, 19:00

Sheet B	1	2	3	4	5	6	7	8	9	10	Final
Russia (Sidorova) 🔨	1	0	1	0	2	0	0	1	0	0	5
Sweden (McManus)	0	0	0	1	0	1	1	0	2	1	6

==== Semifinal ====
Saturday, March 10, 18:00

Sheet C	1	2	3	4	5	6	7	8	9	10	Final
Czech Republic (Hájková) 🔨	0	1	1	0	3	0	0	0	0	1	6
Sweden (McManus)	1	0	0	3	0	0	0	0	1	0	5

==== Bronze-medal game ====
Sunday, March 11, 9:00

Sheet B	1	2	3	4	5	6	7	8	9	10	Final
Sweden (McManus) 🔨	0	0	1	0	2	0	0	1	0	X	4
Russia (Sidorova)	0	0	0	2	0	3	1	0	1	X	7

==== Gold-medal game ====
Sunday, March 11, 9:00

Sheet C	1	2	3	4	5	6	7	8	9	10	11	Final
Scotland (Fleming) 🔨	0	0	2	0	0	1	0	0	2	0	1	6
Czech Republic (Hájková)	0	1	0	1	0	0	1	0	0	2	0	5

2012 World Junior Women's Curling Championship
(Scotland)
Scotland
9th title
