= 2013 European Mixed Curling Championship =

European Curling competition

- Host city: Edinburgh, Scotland
- Arena: Murrayfield Curling Rink
- Dates: September 14–21
- Winner: Germany
- Skip: Andy Kapp
- Third: Petra Tschetsch
- Second: Holger Höhne
- Lead: Pia-Lisa Schöll
- Finalist: Scotland (Ewan MacDonald)

The 2013 European Mixed Curling Championship was held from September 14 to 21 at the Murrayfield Curling Rink in Edinburgh, Scotland. Due to an issue with the ice chilling plant, play was postponed from Saturday night until Sunday night.

Germany's Andy Kapp defeated defending champion Scotland's Ewan MacDonald with a score of 5–4. The game was tied after four ends, but Scotland gave up a steal of two in the sixth end after a draw by MacDonald came up light. Scotland scored two in the seventh end, but Germany were able to get one point in the final end to win the title.

== Teams ==
The teams are listed as follows:

=== Red Group ===
Belarus	Czech Republic	France	Germany	Hungary
Skip: Alina Pavlyuchik; Third: Dmitry Kirillov; Second: Ekaterina Kirillova; Lead: George Kirillov	Skip: Miloš Hoferka; Third: Lenka Kitzbergerová; Second: Martin Štěpánek; Lead: Michaela Nádherová	Skip: Lionel Roux; Third: Hélène Grieshaber; Second: Xavier Bibollet; Lead: Florence Richard	Skip: Andy Kapp; Third: Petra Tschetsch; Second: Holger Höhne; Lead: Pia-Lisa Schöll	Skip: György Nagy; Third: Ildikó Szekeres; Second: Zsolt Kiss; Lead: Ágnes Szentannai; Alternate: Jakab Zoltán
Latvia	Poland	Romania	Scotland	
Skip: Arnis Veidemanis; Third: Iluta Linde; Second: Rihards Jeske; Lead: Sabīne Jeske	Fourth: Michal Janowski; Skip: Aneta Lipinska; Second: Szymon Molski; Lead: Florek Lajna	Skip: Allen Coliban; Third: Cristina-Teodora Adumitroaei; Second: Valentin Anghelinei; Lead: Zsuzsanna Berecki	Skip: Ewan MacDonald; Third: Kay Adams; Second: Euan Byers; Lead: Karen Barthelemy	

=== Blue Group ===
England	Estonia	Norway	Russia
Skip: John Sharp; Third: Lorna Rettig; Second: Nigel Patrick; Lead: Alison Hemmings	Skip: Erkki Lill; Third: Maile Mölder; Second: Harri Lill; Lead: Küllike Ustav	Skip: Hans Roger Tømmervold; Third: Marte Bakk; Second: Olav Helge Storli; Lead: Pia Trulsen	Skip: Roman Kutuzov; Third: Valeria Shelkova; Second: Vadim Raev; Lead: Mariia Duiunova
Spain	Sweden	Switzerland	Wales
Skip: Sergio Vez Third: Irantzu García; Second: Alberto Vez; Lead: Estrella Labrador	Fourth: Towe Lundman; Skip: Gustav Eskilsson; Second: Anna Gustafsson; Lead: Jesper Johansson	Skip: Marc Pfister; Third: Carole Howald; Second: Kevin Wunderlin; Lead: Nora Baumann	Skip: Adrian Meikle; Third: Dawn Watson; Second: Andrew Tanner; Lead: Laura Beever

=== Yellow Group ===
Austria	Denmark	Finland	Ireland
Skip: Mathias Genner; Third: Andrea Höfler; Second: Constanze Hummelt; Lead: Sebastian Wunderer	Skip: Joel Ostrowski; Third: Camilla Jensen; Second: Søren Jensen; Lead: Pavla Rubasova	Skip: Tomi Rantamäki; Third: Anne Malmi; Second: Pekka Peura; Lead: Tiina Suuripää	Skip: Robin Gray; Third: Louise Kerr; Second: John Jo Kenny; Lead: Hazel Gormley-Leahy
Italy	Slovakia	Slovenia	Turkey
Skip: Federica Apollonio; Third: Marcello Pachner; Second: Stefania Menardi; Lead: Malko Tondella	Skip: Pavol Pitoňák; Third: Daniela Matulová; Second: Frantisek Pitoňák; Lead: Zuzana Axamitová	Fourth: Irena Manček; Third: Matevž Javornik; Second: Gaja Palzl; Skip: Urban Zelinka	Skip: Alican Karataş; Third: Öznur Polat; Second: Muhammet Oǧuz Zengin; Lead: Elif Kızılkaya

== Round-robin standings ==
Final round-robin standings

Key
Teams to Playoffs
Teams to Draw Shot Challenge (team with best moves to playoffs, other two play in qualification game)
Teams to Tiebreaker (winner moves on to Draw Shot Challenge)

Red Group	Skip	W	L
Germany	Andy Kapp	7	1
Scotland	Ewan MacDonald	7	1
Hungary	György Nagy	6	2
Czech Republic	Miloš Hoferka	4	4
Latvia	Arnis Veidemanis	4	4
Belarus	Alina Pavliuchyk	3	5
France	Lionel Roux	3	5
Poland	Aneta Lipinska	2	6
Romania	Allen Coliban	0	8

Blue Group	Skip	W	L
Switzerland	Marc Pfister	6	1
Sweden	Gustav Eskilsson	5	2
Spain	Sergio Vez	4	3
Norway	Hans Roger Tømmervold	3	4
Wales	Adrian Meikle	3	4
England	John Sharp	3	4
Russia	Roman Kutuzov	3	4
Estonia	Erkki Lill	1	6

Yellow Group	Skip	W	L
Finland	Tomi Rantamäki	7	0
Denmark	Joel Ostrowski	5	2
Slovakia	Pavol Pitoňák	4	3
Italy	Federica Apollonio	4	3
Austria	Mathias Genner	4	3
Ireland	Robin Gray	3	4
Turkey	Alican Karataş	1	6
Slovenia	Urban Zelinka	0	7

== Round-robin results ==
All draw times are listed in Greenwich Mean Time (UTC+0).

=== Red Group ===
==== Sunday, September 15 ====
Draw 1 21:00

Sheet A	1	2	3	4	5	6	7	8	Final
Hungary (Nagy)	2	0	0	2	1	1	0	X	6
Latvia (Veidemanis)	0	1	1	0	0	0	2	X	4

Sheet C	1	2	3	4	5	6	7	8	Final
Germany (Kapp)	3	0	1	1	0	1	1	X	7
France (Roux)	0	1	0	0	1	0	0	X	1

Sheet E	1	2	3	4	5	6	7	8	Final
Poland (Lipinska)	0	0	0	0	1	0	X	X	1
Scotland (MacDonald)	4	3	1	2	0	3	X	X	13

Sheet F	1	2	3	4	5	6	7	8	Final
Belarus (Pavliuchyk)	0	0	1	0	0	0	1	X	2
Czech Republic (Hoferka)	0	1	0	2	3	1	0	X	7

==== Monday, September 16 ====
Draw 2 8:30

Sheet B	1	2	3	4	5	6	7	8	Final
Czech Republic (Hoferka)	1	0	2	0	1	2	2	X	8
Romania (Coliban)	0	0	0	2	0	0	0	X	2

Sheet D	1	2	3	4	5	6	7	8	Final
Scotland (MacDonald)	1	0	1	1	0	0	0	X	3
Germany (Kapp)	0	2	0	0	1	1	2	X	6

Sheet E	1	2	3	4	5	6	7	8	Final
Hungary (Nagy)	0	2	0	1	0	0	1	1	5
France (Roux)	2	0	1	0	1	2	0	0	6

Sheet F	1	2	3	4	5	6	7	8	Final
Latvia (Veidemanis)	0	0	1	0	1	0	0	1	3
Poland (Lipinska)	0	0	0	1	0	1	0	0	2

Draw 4 16:30

Sheet A	1	2	3	4	5	6	7	8	Final
Romania (Coliban)	0	0	1	0	0	1	0	X	2
France (Roux)	2	1	0	1	2	0	3	X	9

Sheet B	1	2	3	4	5	6	7	8	Final
Germany (Kapp)	1	0	2	0	3	4	X	X	10
Poland (Lipinska)	0	2	0	1	0	0	X	X	3

Sheet E	1	2	3	4	5	6	7	8	Final
Belarus (Pavliuchyk)	0	0	1	0	1	1	1	X	4
Latvia (Veidemanis)	1	4	0	2	0	0	0	X	7

Sheet F	1	2	3	4	5	6	7	8	Final
Czech Republic (Hoferka)	0	0	0	0	0	3	X	X	3
Scotland (MacDonald)	2	2	1	1	2	0	X	X	8

==== Tuesday, September 17 ====
Draw 6 8:30

Sheet A	1	2	3	4	5	6	7	8	Final
Poland (Lipinska)	0	1	0	0	1	1	X	X	3
Hungary (Nagy)	4	0	3	1	0	0	X	X	8

Sheet B	1	2	3	4	5	6	7	8	Final
Romania (Coliban)	0	0	0	1	0	0	X	X	1
Belarus (Pavliuchyk)	2	1	3	0	1	2	X	X	9

Sheet C	1	2	3	4	5	6	7	8	Final
Czech Republic (Hoferka)	0	0	1	1	0	1	1	1	5
Latvia (Veidemanis)	2	0	0	0	1	0	0	0	3

Sheet D	1	2	3	4	5	6	7	8	Final
France (Roux)	1	0	1	0	0	1	X	X	3
Scotland (MacDonald)	0	2	0	2	3	0	X	X	7

Draw 8 16:30

Sheet A	1	2	3	4	5	6	7	8	Final
Belarus (Pavliuchyk)	0	2	0	2	0	1	0	X	5
Scotland (MacDonald)	2	0	3	0	4	0	0	X	9

Sheet B	1	2	3	4	5	6	7	8	9	Final
France (Roux)	0	1	1	0	0	1	0	2	0	5
Latvia (Veidemanis)	0	0	0	3	1	0	1	0	2	7

Sheet C	1	2	3	4	5	6	7	8	Final
Hungary (Nagy)	1	0	0	3	1	1	0	0	6
Czech Republic (Hoferka)	0	0	1	0	0	0	3	1	5

Sheet E	1	2	3	4	5	6	7	8	Final
Germany (Kapp)	2	3	2	0	2	0	6	X	15
Romania (Coliban)	0	0	0	1	0	1	0	X	2

==== Wednesday, September 18 ====
Draw 10 8:30

Sheet A	1	2	3	4	5	6	7	8	Final
Germany (Kapp)	3	4	0	1	2	0	X	X	10
Belarus (Pavliuchyk)	0	0	1	0	0	2	X	X	3

Sheet C	1	2	3	4	5	6	7	8	Final
Latvia (Veidemanis)	0	0	0	1	1	0	0	X	2
Scotland (MacDonald)	2	1	0	0	0	2	2	X	7

Sheet D	1	2	3	4	5	6	7	8	Final
Poland (Lipinska)	0	1	0	1	0	1	0	X	3
Czech Republic (Hoferka)	4	0	2	0	1	0	1	X	8

Sheet F	1	2	3	4	5	6	7	8	Final
Romania (Coliban)	0	0	0	2	0	1	0	X	3
Hungary (Nagy)	1	1	1	0	2	0	4	X	9

Draw 12 16:30

Sheet C	1	2	3	4	5	6	7	8	Final
Scotland (MacDonald)	5	2	0	2	0	1	X	X	10
Romania (Coliban)	0	0	1	0	1	0	X	X	2

Sheet D	1	2	3	4	5	6	7	8	Final
Hungary (Nagy)	0	1	0	0	1	1	2	1	6
Belarus (Pavliuchyk)	2	0	1	2	0	0	0	0	5

Sheet E	1	2	3	4	5	6	7	8	Final
Latvia (Veidemanis)	0	0	0	2	0	2	0	X	4
Germany (Kapp)	1	0	2	0	5	0	1	X	9

Sheet F	1	2	3	4	5	6	7	8	Final
Poland (Lipinska)	0	0	1	0	2	3	0	X	6
France (Roux)	0	0	0	1	0	0	2	X	3

==== Thursday, September 19 ====
Draw 14 10:00

Sheet C	1	2	3	4	5	6	7	8	Final
Belarus (Pavliuchyk)	2	0	1	0	2	0	0	1	6
Poland (Lipinska)	0	1	0	2	0	1	1	0	5

Sheet D	1	2	3	4	5	6	7	8	Final
Latvia (Veidemanis)	2	0	1	0	0	1	0	X	4
Romania (Coliban)	0	0	0	2	0	0	0	X	2

Sheet E	1	2	3	4	5	6	7	8	Final
France (Roux)	1	0	2	0	0	0	1	0	4
Czech Republic (Hoferka)	0	2	0	0	0	0	0	0	2

Sheet F	1	2	3	4	5	6	7	8	Final
Hungary (Nagy)	0	3	0	0	2	0	1	X	6
Germany (Kapp)	0	0	1	0	0	2	0	X	3

Draw 16 19:00

Sheet A	1	2	3	4	5	6	7	8	9	Final
Czech Republic (Hoferka)	2	0	2	0	1	0	1	0	0	6
Germany (Kapp)	0	1	0	0	0	2	0	3	2	8

Sheet B	1	2	3	4	5	6	7	8	Final
Scotland (MacDonald)	1	0	4	3	0	0	X	X	8
Hungary (Nagy)	0	1	0	0	0	1	X	X	2

Sheet D	1	2	3	4	5	6	7	8	Final
Romania (Coliban)	0	0	0	1	2	0	0	X	3
Poland (Lipinska)	1	1	2	0	0	1	1	X	6

Sheet F	1	2	3	4	5	6	7	8	Final
France (Roux)	2	0	0	3	0	0	0	0	5
Belarus (Pavliuchyk)	0	1	1	0	3	1	1	1	8

=== Blue Group ===
==== Monday, September 16 ====
Draw 3 12:30

Sheet A	1	2	3	4	5	6	7	8	Final
Russia (Kutuzov)	0	0	0	0	0	0	0	X	0
England (Sharp)	0	0	1	0	2	2	1	X	6

Sheet B	1	2	3	4	5	6	7	8	Final
Switzerland (Pfister)	1	0	0	0	1	0	0	2	4
Estonia (Lill)	0	0	0	0	0	1	1	0	2

Sheet D	1	2	3	4	5	6	7	8	Final
Norway (Tømmervold)	1	0	1	0	1	1	0	1	5
Wales (Meikle)	0	2	0	1	0	0	1	0	4

Sheet F	1	2	3	4	5	6	7	8	Final
Sweden (Eskilsson)	3	1	0	6	0	2	X	X	12
Spain (Vez)	0	0	1	0	1	0	X	X	2

Draw 5 20:30

Sheet A	1	2	3	4	5	6	7	8	Final
Spain (Vez)	0	3	5	0	1	1	0	X	10
Wales (Meikle)	1	0	0	4	0	0	2	X	7

Sheet B	1	2	3	4	5	6	7	8	Final
Sweden (Eskilsson)	0	1	0	0	1	2	3	X	7
Norway (Tømmervold)	2	0	2	0	0	0	0	X	4

Sheet C	1	2	3	4	5	6	7	8	Final
Russia (Kutuzov)	2	0	0	0	2	1	1	X	6
Switzerland (Pfister)	0	0	0	3	0	0	0	X	3

Sheet F	1	2	3	4	5	6	7	8	Final
England (Sharp)	0	0	1	0	1	1	1	1	5
Estonia (Lill)	1	1	0	1	0	0	0	0	3

==== Tuesday, September 17 ====
Draw 7 12:30

Sheet B	1	2	3	4	5	6	7	8	Final
England (Sharp)	0	0	0	1	1	0	2	0	4
Spain (Vez)	0	2	1	0	0	1	0	1	5

Sheet D	1	2	3	4	5	6	7	8	Final
Sweden (Eskilsson)	4	0	0	1	0	2	0	X	7
Estonia (Lill)	0	2	1	0	1	0	1	X	5

Sheet E	1	2	3	4	5	6	7	8	Final
Russia (Kutuzov)	0	0	0	1	1	0	1	X	3
Wales (Meikle)	1	1	1	0	0	1	0	X	4

Sheet F	1	2	3	4	5	6	7	8	Final
Norway (Tømmervold)	1	0	1	0	1	1	0	1	5
Switzerland (Pfister)	0	1	0	2	0	0	3	0	6

Draw 9 20:30

Sheet A	1	2	3	4	5	6	7	8	Final
Switzerland (Pfister)	1	2	0	0	2	3	X	X	8
Spain (Vez)	0	0	0	1	0	0	X	X	1

Sheet C	1	2	3	4	5	6	7	8	Final
Wales (Meikle)	0	0	2	0	1	1	0	1	5
Estonia (Lill)	0	2	0	2	0	0	0	0	4

Sheet E	1	2	3	4	5	6	7	8	Final
Norway (Tømmervold)	0	1	3	0	3	0	0	1	8
England (Sharp)	1	0	0	2	0	2	1	0	6

Sheet F	1	2	3	4	5	6	7	8	Final
Russia (Kutuzov)	1	0	1	0	0	1	0	X	3
Sweden (Eskilsson)	0	2	0	1	1	0	2	X	6

==== Wednesday, September 18 ====
Draw 11 12:30

Sheet A	1	2	3	4	5	6	7	8	9	Final
Estonia (Lill)	1	1	0	2	0	2	0	1	0	7
Norway (Tømmervold)	0	0	3	0	2	0	2	0	3	10

Sheet B	1	2	3	4	5	6	7	8	Final
Wales (Meikle)	2	0	0	2	2	0	4	X	10
England (Sharp)	0	1	0	0	0	1	0	X	2

Sheet D	1	2	3	4	5	6	7	8	Final
Spain (Vez)	0	2	0	0	2	0	1	X	5
Russia (Kutuzov)	3	0	3	1	0	1	0	X	8

Sheet E	1	2	3	4	5	6	7	8	Final
Switzerland (Pfister)	4	0	3	0	2	0	3	X	12
Sweden (Eskilsson)	0	2	0	2	0	2	0	X	6

Draw 13 20:30

Sheet A	1	2	3	4	5	6	7	8	Final
Norway (Tømmervold)	0	1	0	0	1	0	X	X	2
Russia (Kutuzov)	1	0	4	1	0	2	X	X	8

Sheet C	1	2	3	4	5	6	7	8	Final
Sweden (Eskilsson)	0	1	0	1	0	1	1	0	4
England (Sharp)	3	0	1	0	1	0	0	1	6

Sheet E	1	2	3	4	5	6	7	8	Final
Estonia (Lill)	0	0	2	0	1	2	0	X	5
Spain (Vez)	4	3	0	3	0	0	1	X	11

Sheet F	1	2	3	4	5	6	7	8	Final
Switzerland (Pfister)	0	2	0	2	0	0	0	3	7
Wales (Meikle)	1	0	2	0	0	1	0	0	4

==== Thursday, September 19 ====
Draw 15 14:30

Sheet A	1	2	3	4	5	6	7	8	Final
Wales (Meikle)	2	0	0	0	1	0	1	X	4
Sweden (Eskilsson)	0	1	2	2	0	1	0	X	6

Sheet B	1	2	3	4	5	6	7	8	Final
Estonia (Lill)	0	0	0	2	0	1	0	1	4
Russia (Kutuzov)	1	0	1	0	1	0	0	0	3

Sheet C	1	2	3	4	5	6	7	8	Final
Spain (Vez)	0	0	0	3	0	0	0	1	4
Norway (Tømmervold)	1	0	0	0	0	2	0	0	3

Sheet D	1	2	3	4	5	6	7	8	Final
England (Sharp)	0	1	0	0	2	0	0	X	3
Switzerland (Pfister)	2	0	2	1	0	1	3	X	9

=== Yellow Group ===
==== Sunday, September 15 ====
Draw 1 21:00

Sheet B	1	2	3	4	5	6	7	8	Final
Italy (Apollonio)	1	1	0	1	0	0	0	X	3
Austria (Genner)	0	0	3	0	1	3	1	X	8

Sheet D	1	2	3	4	5	6	7	8	9	Final
Turkey (Karataş)	1	0	0	0	1	2	2	1	0	7
Denmark (Ostrowski)	0	2	1	4	0	0	0	0	1	8

==== Monday, September 16 ====
Draw 2 8:30

Sheet A	1	2	3	4	5	6	7	8	Final
Finland (Rantamäki)	1	0	2	0	1	2	2	X	8
Turkey (Karataş)	0	0	0	2	0	0	0	X	2

Sheet C	1	2	3	4	5	6	7	8	Final
Denmark (Ostrowski)	0	0	1	1	1	0	0	3	6
Slovakia (Pitoňák)	2	0	0	0	0	2	0	0	4

Draw 3 12:30

Sheet C	1	2	3	4	5	6	7	8	Final
Ireland (Gray)	0	1	0	0	0	0	2	0	3
Austria (Genner)	0	0	2	0	1	1	0	1	5

Sheet E	1	2	3	4	5	6	7	8	Final
Italy (Apollonio)	3	1	1	3	0	3	X	X	11
Turkey (Karataş)	0	0	0	0	2	0	X	X	2

Draw 4 16:30

Sheet C	1	2	3	4	5	6	7	8	Final
Slovenia (Zelinka)	0	0	0	0	1	0	0	X	1
Finland (Rantamäki)	1	1	2	3	0	2	1	X	10

Draw 5 20:30

Sheet D	1	2	3	4	5	6	7	8	Final
Ireland (Gray)	0	0	1	0	0	1	0	X	2
Slovakia (Pitoňák)	0	3	0	2	1	0	1	X	7

Sheet E	1	2	3	4	5	6	7	8	Final
Denmark (Ostrowski)	1	0	3	1	0	2	0	X	7
Austria (Genner)	0	1	0	0	2	0	1	X	4

==== Tuesday, September 17 ====
Draw 6 8:30

Sheet E	1	2	3	4	5	6	7	8	Final
Turkey (Karataş)	0	0	0	0	0	0	X	X	0
Ireland (Gray)	3	2	1	2	1	4	X	X	13

Sheet F	1	2	3	4	5	6	7	8	Final
Italy (Apollonio)	1	1	0	0	0	0	1	X	3
Denmark (Ostrowski)	0	0	3	1	0	2	0	X	6

Draw 8 16:30

Sheet D	1	2	3	4	5	6	7	8	Final
Italy (Apollonio)	1	1	0	3	1	0	2	X	8
Slovenia (Zelinka)	0	0	1	0	0	1	0	X	2

Sheet F	1	2	3	4	5	6	7	8	9	Final
Austria (Genner)	0	1	0	3	0	1	0	1	0	6
Finland (Rantamäki)	1	0	1	0	1	0	3	0	3	9

Draw 9 20:30

Sheet B	1	2	3	4	5	6	7	8	Final
Slovenia (Zelinka)	0	0	0	0	1	0	X	X	1
Ireland (Gray)	4	1	1	3	0	4	X	X	13

Sheet D	1	2	3	4	5	6	7	8	Final
Slovakia (Pitoňák)	1	1	0	2	0	1	0	X	5
Finland (Rantamäki)	0	0	3	0	2	0	3	X	8

==== Wednesday, September 18 ====
Draw 10 8:30

Sheet B	1	2	3	4	5	6	7	8	Final
Ireland (Gray)	0	0	1	0	2	0	0	X	3
Finland (Rantamäki)	0	1	0	2	0	3	1	X	7

Sheet E	1	2	3	4	5	6	7	8	Final
Slovakia (Pitoňák)	1	0	3	0	1	0	3	X	8
Slovenia (Zelinka)	0	1	0	1	0	1	0	X	3

Draw 11 12:30

Sheet C	1	2	3	4	5	6	7	8	Final
Austria (Genner)	1	0	1	3	0	1	0	1	7
Turkey (Karataş)	0	1	0	0	1	0	3	0	5

Draw 12 16:30

Sheet A	1	2	3	4	5	6	7	8	Final
Ireland (Gray)	1	0	0	0	3	1	0	1	6
Italy (Apollonio)	0	4	1	1	0	0	1	0	7

Sheet B	1	2	3	4	5	6	7	8	Final
Finland (Rantamäki)	0	0	2	0	1	2	1	0	6
Denmark (Ostrowski)	1	1	0	1	0	0	0	1	4

Draw 13 20:30

Sheet B	1	2	3	4	5	6	7	8	Final
Slovakia (Pitoňák)	0	0	1	2	1	0	0	1	5
Turkey (Karataş)	1	1	0	0	0	1	0	0	3

Sheet D	1	2	3	4	5	6	7	8	Final
Slovenia (Zelinka)	0	1	0	0	0	0	0	X	1
Austria (Genner)	2	0	2	1	1	0	2	X	8

==== Thursday, September 19 ====
Draw 14 10:00

Sheet A	1	2	3	4	5	6	7	8	Final
Austria (Genner)	0	2	0	2	0	0	1	1	6
Slovakia (Pitoňák)	1	0	2	0	4	0	0	0	7

Sheet B	1	2	3	4	5	6	7	8	Final
Turkey (Karataş)	0	1	1	4	0	0	0	X	6
Slovenia (Zelinka)	1	0	0	0	2	1	0	X	4

Draw 15 14:30

Sheet E	1	2	3	4	5	6	7	8	Final
Finland (Rantamäki)	0	0	2	1	2	0	0	X	5
Italy (Apollonio)	1	1	0	0	0	1	0	X	3

Sheet F	1	2	3	4	5	6	7	8	Final
Denmark (Ostrowski)	0	0	1	0	0	0	X	X	1
Ireland (Gray)	2	1	0	3	2	1	X	X	9

Draw 16 19:00

Sheet C	1	2	3	4	5	6	7	8	Final
Slovakia (Pitoňák)	0	3	0	4	0	1	0	0	8
Italy (Apollonio)	2	0	2	0	4	0	1	1	10

Sheet E	1	2	3	4	5	6	7	8	Final
Slovenia (Zelinka)	0	1	0	0	1	0	X	X	2
Denmark (Ostrowski)	2	0	3	1	0	3	X	X	9

== Tiebreaker ==
Saturday, September 20, 10:00

Sheet D	1	2	3	4	5	6	7	8	Final
Slovakia (Pitoňák)	1	0	0	2	3	0	1	X	7
Italy (Tondella)	0	1	0	0	0	1	0	X	2

== Playoffs ==
Qualification Game
R3	Hungary	8
B3	Spain	1

Quarterfinals
R1	Germany	9
Y3	Slovakia	4
Y1	Finland	7
B2	Sweden	3
R2	Scotland	6
Y2	Denmark	4
B1	Switzerland	4
R3	Hungary	6

Semifinals
R1	Germany	7
Y1	Finland	5
R2	Scotland	8
R3	Hungary	4

Gold Medal Game
R1	Germany	5
R2	Scotland	4

Bronze Medal Game
Y1	Finland	3
R3	Hungary	6

=== Qualification Game ===
Friday, September 20, 14:30

Sheet C	1	2	3	4	5	6	7	8	Final
Hungary (Nagy)	2	3	0	2	0	1	X	X	8
Spain (Vez)	0	0	0	0	1	0	X	X	1

=== Quarterfinals ===
Friday, September 20, 19:00

Sheet A	1	2	3	4	5	6	7	8	Final
Germany (Kapp)	1	1	0	3	0	2	2	X	9
Slovakia (Pitoňák)	0	0	1	0	3	0	0	X	4

Sheet B	1	2	3	4	5	6	7	8	Final
Finland (Rantamäki)	0	2	2	1	0	2	0	X	7
Sweden (Eskilsson)	1	0	0	0	1	0	1	X	3

Sheet D	1	2	3	4	5	6	7	8	Final
Scotland (MacDonald)	3	0	0	2	0	1	0	X	6
Denmark (Ostrowski)	0	1	1	0	1	0	1	X	4

Sheet E	1	2	3	4	5	6	7	8	Final
Switzerland (Pfister)	0	0	0	1	0	2	1	0	4
Hungary (Nagy)	2	0	1	0	2	0	0	1	6

=== Semifinals ===
Saturday, September 21, 10:00

Sheet D	1	2	3	4	5	6	7	8	Final
Germany (Kapp)	1	0	2	0	2	0	2	0	7
Finland (Rantamäki)	0	2	0	1	0	1	0	1	5

Sheet A	1	2	3	4	5	6	7	8	Final
Scotland (MacDonald)	4	0	0	0	0	3	1	X	8
Hungary (Nagy)	0	1	1	1	1	0	0	X	4

=== Bronze medal game ===
Saturday, September 21, 15:00

Sheet C	1	2	3	4	5	6	7	8	Final
Finland (Rantamäki)	2	0	0	1	0	0	0	X	3
Hungary (Nagy)	0	1	1	0	2	0	2	X	6

=== Gold medal game ===
Saturday, September 21, 15:00

Sheet B	1	2	3	4	5	6	7	8	Final
Germany (Kapp)	1	0	0	0	1	2	0	1	5
Scotland (MacDonald)	0	1	1	0	0	0	2	0	4

2013 European Mixed Curling Championship
(Germany)
Germany
2nd title
