= Stefania Menardi =

Italian curler

- Curler ♀
- Born: 18 May 1992 (age 34); Cortina d'Ampezzo, Italy

Team
- Curling club: CC Tofane, Cortina d'Ampezzo

Curling career
- Member Association: Italy
- World Championship: 1 (2016)
- European Championship: 3 (2010, 2015, 2016)
- Other appearances: European Mixed Championship: 1 (2013), World Junior Championships: 1 (2012), European Junior Challenge: 2 (2009, 2012)
Medal record
Curling
Italian Women's Championship
Gold medal – first place	2011
Gold medal – first place	2012
Gold medal – first place	2015 Cembra
Gold medal – first place	2016 Claut
Gold medal – first place	2017 Pinerolo
Bronze medal – third place	2019 Pinerolo
European Junior Challenge
Gold medal – first place	2012 Copenhagen
Bronze medal – third place	2009 Copenhagen

Stefania Menardi (born 18 May 1992 in Cortina d'Ampezzo) is an Italian curler.

At the national level, she is a five-time Italian women's champion (2011, 2012, 2015, 2016, 2017) and a 2013 Italian mixed champion.

== Teams ==
=== Women's ===
Season	Skip	Third	Second	Lead	Alternate	Coach	Events
2008–09	Giorgia Apollonio	Chiara Zanotelli	Federica Apollonio	Giada Mosaner	Stefania Menardi	Jean-Pierre Rütsche; Alberto Menardi	EJCC 2009 (bronze)
2010–11	Giorgia Apollonio	Federica Apollonio	Chiara Zanotelli	Claudia Alverà	Stefania Menardi	Daniel Rafael	ECC 2010 (12th)
2011–12	Federica Apollonio	Giada Mosaner	Chiara Zanotelli	Stefania Menardi	Anastasia Mosca	Daniel Rafael (EJCC); Giorgia Apollonio (EJCC); Alberto Menardi (WJCC)	EJCC 2012 (gold); WJCC 2012 (9th)
2014–15	Federica Apollonio	Giorgia Apollonio	Chiara Olivieri	Claudia Alverà	Stefania Menardi		IWCC 2015 (gold)
2015–16	Federica Apollonio	Stefania Menardi	Chiara Olivieri	Claudia Alverà	Maria Gaspari	Wolfgang Burba	ECC 2015 (11th)
2015–16	Federica Apollonio	Giorgia Apollonio	Chiara Olivieri	Stefania Menardi	Claudia Alverà	Brian Gray	IWCC 2016 (gold)
2015–16	Federica Apollonio	Stefania Menardi	Chiara Olivieri	Maria Gaspari	Claudia Alverà	Brian Gray	WCC 2016 (12th)
2016–17	Federica Apollonio	Giorgia Apollonio	Stefania Menardi	Claudia Alverà	Chiara Olivieri (ECC); Sara Levetti (IWCC)	Violetta Caldart	ECC 2016 (8th); IWCC 2017 (gold)
2017–18	Federica Apollonio	Giorgia Apollonio	Stefania Menardi	Claudia Alverà	Rosa Pompanin	Alberto Menardi	IWCC 2018 (4th)
2018–19	Federica Apollonio	Giorgia Apollonio	Stefania Menardi	Michela Alverà	Marianna Menardi	Claudia Alverà	IWCC 2019 (bronze)
2019–20	Federica Apollonio	Giorgia Apollonio	Stefania Menardi	Valentina Sovilla	Michela Alverà	Claudia Alverà	

=== Mixed ===
Season	Skip	Third	Second	Lead	Alternate	Events
2012–13	Federica Apollonio	Marcello Pachner	Stefania Menardi	Malko Tondella	Guido Fassina	IMxCC 2013 (gold)
2013–14	Federica Apollonio	Marcello Pachner	Stefania Menardi	Malko Tondella		EMxCC 2013 (10th)

=== Mixed doubles ===
Season	Male	Female	Events
2012–13	Malko Tondella	Stefania Menardi	IMDCC 2013 (bronze)
