= Giorgia Apollonio =

Italian curler

- Curler
- Born: 13 March 1988 (age 38); Pieve di Cadore, Italy

Team
- Curling club: CC Tofane; Cortina d'Ampezzo, Italy
- Skip: Federica Apollonio
- Third: Giorgia Apollonio
- Second: Stefania Menardi
- Lead: Claudia Alvera
- Alternate: Maria Gaspari

Curling career
- World Championship: 5 (2007, 2008, 2009, 2012, 2013)
- European Championship: 7 (2006, 2008, 2009, 2010, 2011, 2012, 2016)
Medal record
Curling
European Championships
Silver medal – second place	2006 Basel

Giorgia Apollonio (born 13 March 1988 in Pieve di Cadore) is an Italian curler.

Apollonio started playing curling in 1997. She plays in third position and is right-handed.
