= Maria Gaspari =

Italian curler

- Curler
- Born: December 9, 1991 (age 34); Pieve di Cadore, Italy

Team
- Curling club: CC Dolomiti; Cortina d'Ampezzo, Italy
- Skip: Federica Apollonio
- Third: Giorgia Apollonio
- Second: Stefania Menardi
- Lead: Claudia Alvera
- Alternate: Maria Gaspari

Curling career
- World Championship: 2 (2013, 2016)
- European Championship: 3 (2012, 2015, 2016)
Medal record
Curling

Maria Gaspari (born 9 December 1991 in Pieve di Cadore) is an Italian curler.

Gaspari Is currently the alternate player for Team Federica Apollonio

She plays in lead position as a lead and is right-handed.
