= Daniel Tenn =

Swedish curler

- Curler ♂
- Born: October 10, 1981 (age 45)

Team
- Curling club: Malung CC, Malung

Curling career
- Member Association: Sweden
- World Championship: 1 (2006)
- Other appearances: World Junior Championships: 3 (2000, 2002, 2003), Winter Universiade: 1 (2007)
Medal record
Curling
World Junior Championships
Silver medal – second place	2002 Kelowna
Silver medal – second place	2003 Flims
Winter Universiade
Bronze medal – third place	2007 Pinerolo

Daniel Tenn (born October 10, 1981) is a Swedish curler.

== Teams ==
Season	Skip	Third	Second	Lead	Alternate	Coach	Events
1999–00	Mikael Sundqvist	Jonas Johansson	Daniel Tenn	Henrik Johansson	Jon Åslund	Magnus Ekdahl	SJСС 2000 (gold); WJCC 2000 (6th)
2001–02	Carl-Axel Dahlin (fourth)	Eric Carlsén (skip)	Nils Carlsén	Emanuel Allberg	Daniel Tenn	Jan Strandlund	WJCC 2002 (silver)
2002–03	Carl-Axel Dahlin (fourth)	Eric Carlsén (skip)	Nils Carlsén	Emanuel Allberg	Daniel Tenn	Mikael Hasselborg	WJCC 2003 (silver)
2005–06	Mathias Carlsson	Henrik Edlund	Daniel Tenn	David Kallin			
2005–06	Nils Carlsén	Niklas Edin	Marcus Hasselborg	Emanuel Allberg	Daniel Tenn	Mikael Hasselborg	WCC 2006 (5th)
2006–07	David Kallin	Daniel Tenn	Mathias Carlsson	Henke Edlund			
2006–07	Sebastian Kraupp	Daniel Tenn	Fredrik Lindberg	Viktor Kjäll			WUG 2007 (bronze)
