= Emanuel Allberg =

Swedish curler (born 1985)

- Curler ♂
- Other names: Manne
- Born: 12 November 1985 (age 41); Sundsvall

Team
- Curling club: Sundsvalls CK, Sundsvall, Sundbybergs CK, Sundbyberg

Curling career
- Member Association: Sweden
- World Championship: 1 (2006)
- Other appearances: World Junior Championships: 6 (2001, 2002, 2003, 2005, 2006, 2007)
Medal record
Curling
World Junior Championships
Silver medal – second place	2002 Kelowna
Silver medal – second place	2003 Flims
Silver medal – second place	2005 Pinerolo
Silver medal – second place	2006 Jeonju
Silver medal – second place	2007 Eveleth

Stig Per Emanuel "Manne" Allberg (born 12 November 1985 in Sundsvall) is a Swedish curler.

He is six-time Swedish junior champion (2001, 2002, 2003, 2005, 2006, 2007).

== Teams ==
=== Men's ===
Season	Skip	Third	Second	Lead	Alternate	Coach	Events
1996–97	Eric Carlsén	Carl-Axel Dahlin	Nils Carlsén	Emanuel Allberg			
1997–98	Eric Carlsén	Carl-Axel Dahlin	Nils Carlsén	Emanuel Allberg			
1998–99	Eric Carlsén	Carl-Axel Dahlin	Nils Carlsén	Emanuel Allberg			
1999–00	Eric Carlsén	Carl-Axel Dahlin	Nils Carlsén	Emanuel Allberg			
2000–01	Carl-Axel Dahlin (fourth)	Eric Carlsén (skip)	Emanuel Allberg	Nils Carlsén	David Kallin (WJCC)	Dan Carlsén	SJCC 2001 (gold); WJCC 2001 (5th)
2001–02	Carl-Axel Dahlin (fourth)	Eric Carlsén (skip)	Nils Carlsén	Emanuel Allberg	Daniel Tenn (WJCC)	Jan Strandlund	SJCC 2002 (gold); WJCC 2002 (silver)
2002–03	Carl-Axel Dahlin (fourth)	Eric Carlsén (skip)	Nils Carlsén	Emanuel Allberg	Daniel Tenn (WJCC)	Mikael Hasselborg	SJCC 2003 (gold); WJCC 2003 (silver)
2003–04	Nils Carlsén	Sebastian Kraupp	Marcus Hasselborg	Emanuel Allberg			
2004–05	Nils Carlsén	Sebastian Kraupp	Marcus Hasselborg	Emanuel Allberg	Niklas Edin (WJCC)	Mikael Hasselborg	SJCC 2005 (gold); WJCC 2005 (silver)
2005–06	Nils Carlsén	Niklas Edin	Marcus Hasselborg	Emanuel Allberg	Fredrik Lindberg (WJCC), Daniel Tenn (WCC)	Mikael Hasselborg	SJCC 2006 (gold); WJCC 2006 (silver); WCC 2006 (5th)
2006–07	Niklas Edin	Marcus Hasselborg	Emanuel Allberg	Fredrik Lindberg	Kristian Lindström (WJCC)	Mikael Hasselborg	SJCC 2007 (gold); WJCC 2007 (silver)

=== Mixed ===
Season	Skip	Third	Second	Lead	Alternate	Events
2016–17	Nils Carlsén	Lisa Löfskog Södergren	Emanuel Allberg	Jenny Wall	Anders Hammarström	SMxCC 2017 (5th)
