= 2005 World Junior Curling Championships =

- Host city: Pinerolo, Italy
- Arena: Pinerolo Palaghiaccio
- Dates: March 3–13
- Men's winner: Canada
- Curling club: Caledonian CC, Regina
- Skip: Kyle George
- Third: Justin Mihalicz
- Second: David Kidby
- Lead: Chris Hebert
- Alternate: Dustin Kidby
- Coach: Dwayne Mihalicz, Tom Coulterman
- Finalist: Sweden (Nils Carlsén)
- Women's winner: Switzerland
- Curling club: CC Bern-Bielle, Bern
- Skip: Tania Grivel
- Third: Anna Hügli
- Second: Stephanie Rüegsegger
- Lead: Franziska Marthaler
- Alternate: Michèle Jäggi
- Coach: Pierre-Yves Grivel
- Finalist: Sweden (Stina Viktorsson)

The 2005 World Junior Curling Championships were held from March 3 to 13 at the Pinerolo Palaghiaccio in Pinerolo, Italy, the site of the curling tournament at the 2006 Olympics.

Canada, skipped by Kyle George and his team from Regina, Saskatchewan defeated Sweden, skipped by Nils Carlsén, 6–5 in the men's final. The game went to an extra end, where George tapped a Canadian stone for shot on his first, which was followed up by Carlsén missing a double-raise takeout attempt, clinching the victory for Canada. George did not have to throw his last stone.

Switzerland, skipped by Tania Grivel from Biel won the women's final, 10–2 over Sweden's Stina Viktorsson's rink. It was the second women's championship for Switzerland.

== Men ==
=== Teams ===
Country	Skip	Third	Second	Lead	Alternate
Canada	Kyle George	Justin Mihalicz	David Kidby	Chris Hebert	Dustin Kidby
Denmark	Kenneth Jørgensen	Rasmus Stjerne	Mikkel Adrup Poulsen	Dennis Hansen	Mikkel Munch Krause
Germany	Steffen Maier	Michael Draxler	Patrick Benz	Yves Swoboda	Denis Kiesel
Italy	Joël Retornaz	Giorgio da Rin	Davide Corbellari	Mirco Ferretti	Silvio Zanotelli
Norway	Øivind A. Grøseth	Hans Tømmervold	Håvard Vad Petersson	Anders Bjørgum	Olav Helge Storli
Scotland	Logan Gray	Ross Paterson	Sandy Gilmour	Graeme Copland	Keith Duncan Millar
South Korea	Kim Soo-hyuk	Kim Chang-min	Park Jong-duk	Park Jin-oh	Ha Jin-hyuk
Sweden	Nils Carlsén	Sebastian Kraupp	Marcus Hasselborg	Emanuel Allberg	Niklas Edin
Switzerland	Toni Müller	Andreas Klauenbösch	Andreas Ägler	Nicolas Hauswirth	Christian von Guten
United States	Kristopher Perkovich	Jason Smith	Jeff Isaacson	Kevin Johnson	Shaye Perkovich

=== Round-robin standings ===
Final Round Robin Standings

Key
Teams to Playoffs

Country	Skip	W	L
Scotland	Logan Gray	9	0
United States	Kristopher Perkovich	7	2
Sweden	Nils Carlsén	7	2
Canada	Kyle George	6	3
Denmark	Kenneth Jørgensen	4	5
Norway	Øivind A. Grøseth	4	5
Switzerland	Toni Müller	4	5
South Korea	Kim Soo-hyuk	2	7
Germany	Steffen Maier	2	7
Italy	Joël Retornaz	0	9

=== Round-robin results ===
==== Draw 1 ====
Thursday, March 3, 14:00

Sheet A	1	2	3	4	5	6	7	8	9	10	Final
Italy (Retornaz)	0	0	1	0	0	0	X	X	X	X	1
South Korea (Kim)	2	1	0	0	6	4	X	X	X	X	13

Sheet B	1	2	3	4	5	6	7	8	9	10	Final
Denmark (Jørgensen)	0	1	0	0	0	0	1	X	X	X	2
Canada (George)	3	0	1	1	1	2	0	X	X	X	8

Sheet C	1	2	3	4	5	6	7	8	9	10	Final
United States (Perkovich)	0	0	2	0	0	2	0	1	0	0	5
Sweden (Carlsén)	0	1	0	1	0	0	1	0	0	0	3

Sheet D	1	2	3	4	5	6	7	8	9	10	Final
Scotland (Gray)	0	0	2	0	2	0	0	2	0	1	7
Switzerland (Müller)	0	0	0	1	0	1	1	0	2	0	5

==== Draw 2 ====
Friday, March 4, 09:00

Sheet A	1	2	3	4	5	6	7	8	9	10	Final
Norway (Grøseth)	0	0	0	0	2	0	3	1	0	0	6
Germany (Maier)	1	0	0	0	0	1	0	0	2	1	5

Sheet B	1	2	3	4	5	6	7	8	9	10	Final
United States (Perkovich)	0	0	0	1	0	1	1	0	0	1	4
Switzerland (Müller)	1	0	2	0	1	0	0	2	1	0	7

Sheet C	1	2	3	4	5	6	7	8	9	10	11	Final
South Korea (Kim)	1	0	0	0	1	0	1	0	1	1	0	5
Denmark (Jørgensen)	0	0	4	0	0	1	0	0	0	0	2	7

Sheet D	1	2	3	4	5	6	7	8	9	10	Final
Canada (George)	1	0	1	1	2	0	1	1	0	1	8
Italy (Retornaz)	0	0	0	0	0	2	0	0	1	0	3

==== Draw 3 ====
Friday, March 4, 19:00

Sheet A	1	2	3	4	5	6	7	8	9	10	Final
Scotland (Gray)	0	0	5	0	2	1	0	1	X	X	9
Sweden (Carlsén)	0	0	0	1	0	0	1	0	X	X	2

Sheet B	1	2	3	4	5	6	7	8	9	10	Final
Germany (Maier)	0	0	0	0	2	1	0	0	1	0	4
South Korea (Kim)	0	0	1	1	0	0	1	1	0	1	5

Sheet C	1	2	3	4	5	6	7	8	9	10	Final
Italy (Retornaz)	0	1	0	2	0	0	0	1	0	0	4
Switzerland (Müller)	2	0	0	0	1	0	1	0	3	1	8

Sheet D	1	2	3	4	5	6	7	8	9	10	Final
Denmark (Jørgensen)	1	0	3	0	0	2	0	2	0	2	10
Norway (Grøseth)	0	2	0	1	1	0	3	0	0	0	7

==== Draw 4 ====
Saturday, March 5, 14:00

Sheet A	1	2	3	4	5	6	7	8	9	10	Final
Canada (George)	0	2	1	0	1	0	1	0	0	0	5
United States (Perkovich)	0	0	0	2	0	1	0	3	0	1	7

Sheet B	1	2	3	4	5	6	7	8	9	10	11	Final
Scotland (Gray)	1	0	1	0	1	1	0	3	1	0	1	9
Norway (Grøseth)	0	2	0	2	0	0	3	0	0	1	0	8

Sheet C	1	2	3	4	5	6	7	8	9	10	Final
Sweden (Carlsén)	0	0	2	0	0	2	0	0	3	0	7
South Korea (Kim)	0	1	0	0	2	0	1	1	0	0	5

Sheet D	1	2	3	4	5	6	7	8	9	10	Final
Italy (Retornaz)	0	2	1	1	0	1	0	1	0	0	6
Germany (Maier)	3	0	0	0	2	0	3	0	1	2	11

==== Draw 5 ====
Sunday, March 6, 09:00

Sheet A	1	2	3	4	5	6	7	8	9	10	Final
Denmark (Jørgensen)	0	0	0	0	0	1	1	0	0	0	2
Switzerland (Müller)	1	0	0	0	0	0	0	2	0	2	5

Sheet B	1	2	3	4	5	6	7	8	9	10	Final
Sweden (Carlsén)	0	0	1	0	0	0	2	0	0	0	3
Germany (Maier)	0	0	0	1	0	0	0	1	0	0	2

Sheet C	1	2	3	4	5	6	7	8	9	10	Final
Canada (George)	0	0	3	0	1	2	0	2	0	0	8
Scotland (Gray)	3	1	0	2	0	0	2	0	0	2	10

Sheet D	1	2	3	4	5	6	7	8	9	10	Final
Norway (Grøseth)	0	0	1	0	0	1	0	1	0	0	3
United States (Perkovich)	0	0	0	0	2	0	2	0	2	0	6

==== Draw 6 ====
Sunday, March 6, 19:00

Sheet A	1	2	3	4	5	6	7	8	9	10	Final
South Korea (Kim)	2	0	1	0	1	0	1	0	1	0	6
Canada (George)	0	2	0	2	0	2	0	2	0	1	9

Sheet B	1	2	3	4	5	6	7	8	9	10	Final
Italy (Retornaz)	2	2	0	1	0	0	0	1	0	0	6
Denmark (Jørgensen)	0	0	2	0	2	1	0	0	3	0	8

Sheet C	1	2	3	4	5	6	7	8	9	10	Final
Germany (Maier)	0	1	0	0	0	2	0	X	X	X	3
United States (Perkovich)	3	0	0	2	2	0	3	X	X	X	10

Sheet D	1	2	3	4	5	6	7	8	9	10	Final
Switzerland (Müller)	0	1	0	1	1	1	0	0	1	0	5
Sweden (Carlsén)	2	0	2	0	0	0	2	0	0	2	8

==== Draw 7 ====
Monday, March 7, 14:00

Sheet A	1	2	3	4	5	6	7	8	9	10	Final
South Korea (Kim)	0	0	0	1	0	2	0	1	0	X	4
Norway (Grøseth)	2	1	1	0	2	0	1	0	2	X	9

Sheet B	1	2	3	4	5	6	7	8	9	10	Final
Switzerland (Müller)	0	0	1	0	0	0	1	0	1	0	3
Canada (George)	1	1	0	1	1	1	0	1	0	0	6

Sheet C	1	2	3	4	5	6	7	8	9	10	Final
Scotland (Gray)	1	0	0	0	3	0	0	1	1	0	6
Italy (Retornaz)	0	1	0	0	0	1	0	0	0	1	3

Sheet D	1	2	3	4	5	6	7	8	9	10	Final
United States (Perkovich)	2	0	2	0	0	1	2	2	X	X	9
Denmark (Jørgensen)	0	2	0	1	0	0	0	0	X	X	3

==== Draw 8 ====
Tuesday, March 8, 09:00

Sheet A	1	2	3	4	5	6	7	8	9	10	Final
Sweden (Carlsén)	0	2	1	0	0	3	0	1	0	0	7
Denmark (Jørgensen)	1	0	0	2	0	0	1	0	1	0	5

Sheet B	1	2	3	4	5	6	7	8	9	10	Final
Norway (Grøseth)	1	0	1	1	1	0	0	0	1	0	5
Italy (Retornaz)	0	1	0	0	0	1	1	0	0	1	4

Sheet C	1	2	3	4	5	6	7	8	9	10	Final
Switzerland (Müller)	0	1	0	1	0	1	0	2	0	0	5
Germany (Maier)	0	0	1	0	1	0	3	0	0	1	6

Sheet D	1	2	3	4	5	6	7	8	9	10	Final
South Korea (Kim)	0	0	2	0	1	0	0	2	0	0	5
Scotland (Gray)	0	2	0	0	0	1	1	0	1	2	7

==== Draw 9 ====
Tuesday, March 8, 19:00

Sheet A	1	2	3	4	5	6	7	8	9	10	Final
Germany (Maier)	1	0	0	0	0	0	0	2	0	X	3
Scotland (Gray)	0	2	0	2	1	1	0	0	2	X	8

Sheet B	1	2	3	4	5	6	7	8	9	10	Final
South Korea (Kim)	0	0	2	0	0	0	2	0	0	0	4
United States (Perkovich)	1	1	0	0	0	1	0	1	1	1	6

Sheet C	1	2	3	4	5	6	7	8	9	10	11	Final
Norway (Grøseth)	0	0	1	1	1	0	2	0	1	2	0	7
Canada (George)	1	3	0	0	0	3	0	1	0	0	1	8

Sheet D	1	2	3	4	5	6	7	8	9	10	Final
Sweden (Carlsén)	0	3	0	2	0	2	0	3	X	X	10
Italy (Retornaz)	1	0	1	0	1	0	1	0	X	X	4

==== Draw 11 ====
Wednesday, March 9, 19:00

Sheet A	1	2	3	4	5	6	7	8	9	10	Final
United States (Perkovich)	1	2	0	0	2	0	1	0	3	X	9
Italy (Retornaz)	0	0	1	0	0	0	0	1	0	X	2

Sheet D	1	2	3	4	5	6	7	8	9	10	Final
Switzerland (Müller)	0	2	0	2	1	1	0	2	X	X	8
South Korea (Kim)	0	0	2	0	0	0	1	0	X	X	3

==== Draw 10 ====
Wednesday, March 9, 14:00

Sheet B	1	2	3	4	5	6	7	8	9	10	Final
Denmark (Jørgensen)	1	0	0	0	1	0	1	0	X	X	3
Scotland (Gray)	0	1	3	1	0	1	0	3	X	X	9

Sheet C	1	2	3	4	5	6	7	8	9	10	Final
Sweden (Carlsén)	1	1	0	0	1	0	2	1	0	1	7
Norway (Grøseth)	0	0	0	1	0	3	0	0	1	0	5

Sheet D	1	2	3	4	5	6	7	8	9	10	Final
Germany (Maier)	0	0	1	0	1	0	1	0	1	0	4
Canada (George)	0	2	0	3	0	1	0	1	0	1	8

==== Draw 12 ====
Thursday, March 10, 14:00

Sheet A	1	2	3	4	5	6	7	8	9	10	Final
Switzerland (Müller)	0	1	0	1	0	0	0	1	1	1	5
Norway (Grøseth)	2	0	1	0	1	2	0	0	0	0	6

Sheet B	1	2	3	4	5	6	7	8	9	10	Final
Canada (George)	0	0	0	0	0	1	0	0	X	X	1
Sweden (Carlsén)	0	0	2	0	2	0	1	0	X	X	5

Sheet C	1	2	3	4	5	6	7	8	9	10	Final
Denmark (Jørgensen)	0	2	0	1	0	2	0	1	1	1	8
Germany (Maier)	0	0	2	0	1	0	1	0	0	0	4

Sheet D	1	2	3	4	5	6	7	8	9	10	11	Final
Scotland (Gray)	0	0	0	0	0	0	1	0	2	0	1	4
United States (Perkovich)	0	0	0	1	0	0	0	1	0	1	0	3

=== Playoffs ===
Semifinals
1	Scotland	2
4	Canada	10
2	United States	5
3	Sweden	8

Gold-medal game
4	Canada	6
3	Sweden	5
Bronze-medal game
1	Scotland	8
2	United States	5

==== Semifinals ====
Saturday, March 12, 12:00

Sheet C	1	2	3	4	5	6	7	8	9	10	Final
Canada (George)	2	0	1	5	0	1	0	1	X	X	10
Scotland (Gray)	0	0	0	0	1	0	1	0	X	X	2

Sheet A	1	2	3	4	5	6	7	8	9	10	Final
United States (Perkovich)	0	0	0	2	0	1	0	0	2	0	5
Sweden (Carlsén)	0	3	0	0	1	0	3	0	0	1	8

==== Bronze-medal game ====
Sunday, March 13, 09:00

Sheet B	1	2	3	4	5	6	7	8	9	10	Final
Scotland (Gray)	1	0	3	0	1	0	2	0	0	1	8
United States (Perkovich)	0	2	0	0	0	2	0	1	0	0	5

==== Gold-medal game ====
Sunday, March 13, 13:00

Sheet B	1	2	3	4	5	6	7	8	9	10	11	Final
Sweden (Carlsén)	0	1	0	0	0	2	0	1	0	1	0	5
Canada (George)	0	0	2	0	1	0	0	0	2	0	1	6

== Women ==
=== Teams ===
Country	Skip	Third	Second	Lead	Alternate
Canada	Andrea Kelly	Kristen McDiarmid	Jodie deSolla	Lianne Sobey	Morgan Muise
China	Wang Bingyu	Yue Qingshuang	Sun Yue	Yu Xinna	
Denmark	Madeleine Dupont	Denise Dupont	Lene Nielsen	Maria Poulsen	Helle Simonsen
Italy	Diana Gaspari	Rosa Pompanin	Arianna Lorenzi	Anna Ghiretti	Georgia Apollonio
Norway	Kristin Skaslien	Marte Bakk	Solveig Enoksen	Ingrid Stensrud	Marianne Rørvik
Russia	Liudmila Privivkova	Nkeiruka Ezekh	Ekaterina Galkina	Margarita Fomina	Angela Tuvaeva
Scotland	Victoria Sloan	Kerry Barr	Clare Wyllie	Laura Kirkpatrick	Kay Adams
Sweden	Stina Viktorsson	Sofie Sidén	Maria Wennerström	Jenny Zetterquist	Sabina Kraupp
Switzerland	Tania Grivel	Anna Hügli	Stephanie Rüegsegger	Franziska Marthaler	Michèle Jäggi
United States	Gillian Gervais	Sarah Gervais	Stephanie Jensen	Stephanie Sambor	Amy Hultstrand

=== Round-robin standings ===
Final Round Robin Standings

Key
Teams to Playoffs
Teams to Tiebreaker

Country	Skip	W	L
Canada	Andrea Kelly	8	1
Sweden	Stina Viktorsson	6	3
Denmark	Madeleine Dupont	6	3
Switzerland	Tania Grivel	5	4
Russia	Liudmila Privivkova	5	4
Norway	Kristin Skaslien	4	5
Scotland	Victoria Sloan	4	5
Italy	Diana Gaspari	3	6
China	Wang Bingyu	3	6
United States	Gillian Gervais	1	8

=== Round-robin results ===
==== Draw 1 ====
Thursday, March 3, 09:00

Sheet A	1	2	3	4	5	6	7	8	9	10	Final
Scotland (Sloan)	1	0	1	0	0	0	0	1	0	0	3
Switzerland (Grivel)	0	1	0	1	1	1	0	0	0	1	5

Sheet B	1	2	3	4	5	6	7	8	9	10	11	Final
Italy (Gaspari)	0	0	2	1	0	1	1	0	2	0	0	7
Norway (Skaslien)	1	0	0	0	4	0	0	1	0	1	2	9

Sheet C	1	2	3	4	5	6	7	8	9	10	Final
Denmark (Dupont)	1	0	0	4	2	2	0	1	0	0	10
China (Wang)	0	1	3	0	0	0	1	0	2	2	9

Sheet D	1	2	3	4	5	6	7	8	9	10	Final
Russia (Privivkova)	0	2	0	0	1	0	1	0	1	0	5
Canada (Kelly)	3	0	2	0	0	1	0	1	0	1	8

==== Draw 2 ====
Thursday, March 3, 19:00

Sheet A	1	2	3	4	5	6	7	8	9	10	Final
Sweden (Viktorsson)	0	0	0	2	0	0	2	0	2	1	7
United States (Gervais)	0	0	1	0	1	0	0	1	0	0	3

Sheet B	1	2	3	4	5	6	7	8	9	10	Final
Denmark (Dupont)	0	1	2	1	0	2	0	0	2	0	8
Canada (Kelly)	1	0	0	0	2	0	2	2	0	2	9

Sheet C	1	2	3	4	5	6	7	8	9	10	Final
Switzerland (Grivel)	0	0	1	1	2	0	1	0	0	2	7
Italy (Gaspari)	0	0	0	0	0	2	0	1	2	0	5

Sheet D	1	2	3	4	5	6	7	8	9	10	Final
Norway (Skaslien)	0	0	0	1	0	0	0	0	X	X	1
Scotland (Sloan)	1	2	1	0	1	1	0	2	X	X	8

==== Draw 3 ====
Friday, March 4, 14:00

Sheet A	1	2	3	4	5	6	7	8	9	10	Final
Russia (Privivkova)	0	0	0	0	1	0	1	1	0	1	4
China (Wang)	1	0	0	0	0	0	0	0	1	0	2

Sheet B	1	2	3	4	5	6	7	8	9	10	Final
United States (Gervais)	0	0	1	0	1	0	1	0	X	X	3
Switzerland (Grivel)	1	2	0	2	0	3	0	1	X	X	9

Sheet C	1	2	3	4	5	6	7	8	9	10	Final
Scotland (Sloan)	0	1	0	0	0	1	0	1	0	1	4
Canada (Kelly)	0	0	1	1	2	0	3	0	1	0	8

Sheet D	1	2	3	4	5	6	7	8	9	10	Final
Italy (Gaspari)	1	1	0	0	2	0	1	0	1	0	6
Sweden (Viktorsson)	0	0	0	2	0	2	0	1	0	2	7

==== Draw 4 ====
Saturday, March 5, 09:00

Sheet A	1	2	3	4	5	6	7	8	9	10	11	Final
Norway (Skaslien)	0	0	1	2	1	0	0	0	2	1	0	7
Denmark (Dupont)	0	0	0	0	0	3	3	1	0	0	1	8

Sheet B	1	2	3	4	5	6	7	8	9	10	Final
Russia (Privivkova)	0	1	0	0	2	0	2	0	0	0	5
Sweden (Viktorsson)	0	0	0	0	0	1	0	2	2	1	6

Sheet C	1	2	3	4	5	6	7	8	9	10	Final
China (Wang)	0	2	1	0	1	0	1	0	0	3	8
Switzerland (Grivel)	2	0	0	2	0	2	0	0	1	0	7

Sheet D	1	2	3	4	5	6	7	8	9	10	Final
Scotland (Sloan)	3	0	0	3	0	0	0	0	1	0	7
United States (Gervais)	0	1	1	0	1	3	0	1	0	1	8

==== Draw 5 ====
Saturday, March 5, 19:00

Sheet A	1	2	3	4	5	6	7	8	9	10	Final
Italy (Gaspari)	0	1	0	1	0	1	0	1	0	0	4
Canada (Kelly)	2	0	1	0	2	0	2	0	1	1	9

Sheet B	1	2	3	4	5	6	7	8	9	10	Final
China (Wang)	1	0	0	2	0	2	1	1	2	3	12
United States (Gervais)	0	1	2	0	1	0	0	0	0	0	4

Sheet C	1	2	3	4	5	6	7	8	9	10	Final
Norway (Skaslien)	0	0	1	0	0	1	0	3	1	0	6
Russia (Privivkova)	3	1	0	1	1	0	1	0	0	1	8

Sheet D	1	2	3	4	5	6	7	8	9	10	Final
Sweden (Viktorsson)	1	2	0	1	1	1	0	0	2	0	8
Denmark (Dupont)	0	0	3	0	0	0	1	1	0	1	6

==== Draw 6 ====
Sunday, March 6, 14:00

Sheet A	1	2	3	4	5	6	7	8	9	10	Final
Switzerland (Grivel)	0	0	1	0	0	0	2	0	2	0	5
Norway (Skaslien)	1	1	0	1	0	1	0	2	0	1	7

Sheet B	1	2	3	4	5	6	7	8	9	10	Final
Scotland (Sloan)	0	0	0	0	1	2	0	0	0	0	3
Italy (Gaspari)	0	0	1	0	0	0	3	1	0	1	6

Sheet C	1	2	3	4	5	6	7	8	9	10	11	Final
United States (Gervais)	2	2	0	0	1	0	0	0	1	1	0	7
Denmark (Dupont)	0	0	1	1	0	3	0	2	0	0	1	8

Sheet D	1	2	3	4	5	6	7	8	9	10	Final
Canada (Kelly)	0	1	0	2	0	3	1	1	0	1	9
China (Wang)	1	0	1	0	2	0	0	0	1	0	5

==== Draw 7 ====
Monday, March 7, 09:00

Sheet A	1	2	3	4	5	6	7	8	9	10	Final
Russia (Privivkova)	0	0	0	2	0	1	0	0	0	0	3
Scotland (Sloan)	1	1	0	0	3	0	0	0	1	2	8

Sheet B	1	2	3	4	5	6	7	8	9	10	Final
Canada (Kelly)	1	0	0	1	1	1	1	0	2	0	7
Norway (Skaslien)	0	2	3	0	0	0	0	2	0	1	8

Sheet C	1	2	3	4	5	6	7	8	9	10	Final
Switzerland (Grivel)	2	0	2	0	1	0	1	2	0	0	8
Sweden (Viktorsson)	0	2	0	1	0	1	0	0	1	1	6

Sheet D	1	2	3	4	5	6	7	8	9	10	Final
Denmark (Dupont)	1	0	2	1	1	3	0	1	X	X	9
Italy (Gaspari)	0	1	0	0	0	0	1	0	X	X	2

==== Draw 8 ====
Monday, March 7, 19:00

Sheet A	1	2	3	4	5	6	7	8	9	10	Final
China (Wang)	0	0	1	0	1	0	1	0	2	1	6
Italy (Gaspari)	1	0	0	1	0	4	0	1	0	0	7

Sheet B	1	2	3	4	5	6	7	8	9	10	11	Final
Sweden (Viktorsson)	0	0	3	0	0	3	0	0	0	1	0	7
Scotland (Sloan)	1	1	0	0	3	0	0	0	2	0	2	9

Sheet C	1	2	3	4	5	6	7	8	9	10	Final
Canada (Kelly)	0	2	0	0	2	0	0	4	2	X	10
United States (Gervais)	2	0	1	1	0	0	1	0	0	X	5

Sheet D	1	2	3	4	5	6	7	8	9	10	Final
Switzerland (Grivel)	0	0	1	0	1	0	1	0	1	0	4
Russia (Privivkova)	0	1	0	2	0	1	0	1	0	1	6

==== Draw 9 ====
Tuesday, March 8, 14:00

Sheet A	1	2	3	4	5	6	7	8	9	10	Final
United States (Gervais)	0	1	0	0	2	1	0	0	1	0	5
Russia (Privivkova)	0	0	2	0	0	0	3	1	0	1	7

Sheet B	1	2	3	4	5	6	7	8	9	10	Final
Switzerland (Grivel)	1	0	2	1	1	1	0	1	3	X	10
Denmark (Dupont)	0	1	0	0	0	0	2	0	0	X	3

Sheet C	1	2	3	4	5	6	7	8	9	10	Final
Sweden (Viktorsson)	0	0	2	2	2	1	0	0	1	X	8
Norway (Skaslien)	1	0	0	0	0	0	1	0	0	X	2

Sheet D	1	2	3	4	5	6	7	8	9	10	Final
China (Wang)	0	0	1	0	0	0	1	0	2	0	4
Scotland (Sloan)	0	2	0	1	1	1	0	2	0	1	8

==== Draw 10 ====
Wednesday, March 9, 09:00

Sheet A	1	2	3	4	5	6	7	8	9	10	Final
Canada (Kelly)	1	0	0	3	0	2	0	2	0	1	9
Sweden (Viktorsson)	0	1	0	0	2	0	1	0	0	0	4

Sheet B	1	2	3	4	5	6	7	8	9	10	Final
Norway (Skaslien)	0	0	0	0	3	1	0	0	2	1	7
China (Wang)	0	0	3	3	0	0	2	2	0	0	10

Sheet D	1	2	3	4	5	6	7	8	9	10	Final
Italy (Gaspari)	0	1	0	1	0	1	1	0	0	2	6
Russia (Privivkova)	2	0	1	0	2	0	0	1	1	0	7

==== Draw 11 ====
Wednesday, March 9, 19:00

Sheet B	1	2	3	4	5	6	7	8	9	10	11	Final
Denmark (Dupont)	0	1	0	0	2	0	0	0	0	2	2	6
Scotland (Sloan)	1	0	1	1	0	0	1	0	0	0	0	5

Sheet C	1	2	3	4	5	6	7	8	9	10	Final
Italy (Gaspari)	0	0	0	2	0	0	3	3	2	X	10
United States (Gervais)	1	0	1	0	1	1	0	0	0	X	4

==== Draw 12 ====
Thursday, March 10, 09:00

Sheet A	1	2	3	4	5	6	7	8	9	10	11	Final
Canada (Kelly)	0	0	1	0	2	0	1	0	2	0	1	7
Switzerland (Grivel)	0	1	0	1	0	1	0	2	0	1	0	6

Sheet B	1	2	3	4	5	6	7	8	9	10	Final
China (Wang)	0	0	1	0	0	1	0	0	2	0	4
Sweden (Viktorsson)	0	1	0	0	1	0	0	2	0	1	5

Sheet C	1	2	3	4	5	6	7	8	9	10	Final
Russia (Privivkova)	0	0	0	0	1	0	1	0	0	0	2
Denmark (Dupont)	0	0	0	2	0	3	0	2	1	1	9

Sheet D	1	2	3	4	5	6	7	8	9	10	Final
United States (Gervais)	0	1	1	0	2	0	0	2	0	0	6
Norway (Skaslien)	2	0	0	1	0	2	0	0	0	3	8

=== Tiebreakers ===
Thursday, March 10, 19:00

Sheet B	1	2	3	4	5	6	7	8	9	10	11	Final
Switzerland (Grivel)	0	0	1	0	1	0	1	0	1	1	1	6
Russia (Privivkova)	0	2	0	1	0	1	0	1	0	0	0	5

Sheet C	1	2	3	4	5	6	7	8	9	10	Final
Norway (Skaslien)	0	3	1	0	0	1	1	0	0	1	7
Scotland (Sloan)	0	0	0	1	2	0	0	2	0	0	5

=== Playoffs ===
Semifinals
1	Canada	7
4	Switzerland	9
2	Sweden	7
3	Denmark	4

Gold-medal game
4	Switzerland	10
2	Sweden	2
Bronze-medal game
1	Canada	6
3	Denmark	4

==== Semifinals ====
Friday, March 11, 19:00

Sheet C	1	2	3	4	5	6	7	8	9	10	Final
Switzerland (Grivel)	0	1	1	0	5	0	0	1	0	1	9
Canada (Kelly)	1	0	0	1	0	2	1	0	2	0	7

Sheet A	1	2	3	4	5	6	7	8	9	10	Final
Sweden (Viktorsson)	0	2	0	0	0	0	1	0	0	4	7
Denmark (Dupont)	0	0	1	0	1	0	0	2	0	0	4

==== Bronze-medal game ====
Saturday, March 12, 12:00

Sheet B	1	2	3	4	5	6	7	8	9	10	Final
Canada (Kelly)	0	2	1	0	1	1	0	0	0	1	6
Denmark (Dupont)	0	0	0	1	0	0	1	1	1	0	4

==== Gold-medal game ====
Saturday, March 12, 17:00

Sheet B	1	2	3	4	5	6	7	8	9	10	Final
Sweden (Viktorsson)	1	0	0	0	1	0	0	0	0	X	2
Switzerland (Grivel)	0	0	1	2	0	1	2	2	2	X	10
