= Stina Viktorsson =

Swedish curler

Medal record

Women's Curling

World Junior Curling Championships
Silver medal – second place	2005 Pinerolo	
Bronze medal – third place	2004 Trois-Rivières	

European Mixed Curling Championship
Silver medal – second place	2005 Andorra	

European Curling Championships
Gold medal – first place	2010 Champéry	

Stina Viktorsson (born 27 June 1985) is a Swedish curler from Umeå. She is a skip.

Viktorsson had an accomplished Junior career in Sweden winning a bronze medal at the 2004 World Junior Curling Championships and a silver at the 2005 Juniors (losing to Switzerland's Tania Grivel). Also in 2005, Viktorsson won a silver medal at the European Mixed Curling Championship while playing third for Niklas Edin. Viktorsson's return to the 2006 Juniors was a disappointing one, where she finished in 8th place.

In 2008, Viktorsson qualified for the 2008 Ford World Women's Curling Championship. At the Vernon World Championships she led her team to a sixth-place finish with a 6 - 5 record. She had the third best performance as a skip shooting 77%.

In 2009 she was inducted into the Swedish Curling Hall of Fame.
