= 2004 World Junior Curling Championships =

- Host city: Trois-Rivières, Quebec, Canada
- Arena: Colisée de Trois-Rivières
- Dates: 20–28 March 2004
- Men's winner: Sweden
- Skip: Niklas Edin
- Third: Nils Carlsén
- Second: Jörgen Granberg
- Lead: Fredrik Lindberg
- Alternate: Anders Eriksson
- Coach: Rickard Hallström
- Finalist: Switzerland (Stefan Rindlisbacher)
- Women's winner: Norway
- Skip: Linn Githmark
- Third: Marianne Rørvik
- Second: Stine Moe
- Lead: Åse Rommetveit Celius
- Alternate: Solveig Enoksen
- Coach: Ole Ingvaldsen
- Finalist: Canada (Jill Mouzar)

The 2004 World Junior Curling Championships were held in Trois-Rivières, Quebec, Canada from 20 March 2004 to 28 March 2004. The venue was the Colisée de Trois-Rivières.

== Men ==
=== Round Robin Standings ===
Final Round Robin Standings

Key
Teams to Playoffs
Teams to Tiebreaker

Country	Skip	W	L
Sweden	Niklas Edin	8	1
Switzerland	Stefan Rindlisbacher	7	2
Scotland	Scott Hamilton	6	3
South Korea	Kim Soo-hyuk	5	4
Canada	Ryan Sherrard	5	4
Norway	Håvard Vad Petersson	4	5
Italy	Joël Retornaz	3	6
Germany	Alexander Baumann	3	6
Japan	Yusuke Morozumi	2	7
Denmark	Kenneth Jørgensen	2	7

=== Tiebreaker ===
- South Korea 7–4 Canada

=== Playoffs ===
Semifinals
1	Sweden	10
4	South Korea	3
2	Switzerland	5
3	Scotland	4

Gold Medal Game
1	Sweden	5
2	Switzerland	4
Bronze Medal Game
3	Scotland	11
4	South Korea	5

== Women ==
=== Round Robin Standings ===
Final Round Robin Standings

Key
Teams to Playoffs

Country	Skip	W	L
Canada	Jill Mouzar	9	0
Sweden	Stina Viktorsson	7	2
Norway	Linn Githmark	6	3
United States	Aileen Sormunen	5	4
Switzerland	Stéphanie Jäggi	4	5
Denmark	Madeleine Dupont	4	5
Scotland	Sarah Reid	3	6
Japan	Ai Kobayashi	3	6
Italy	Diana Gaspari	2	7
Russia	Liudmila Privivkova	2	7

=== Playoffs ===
Semifinals
1	Canada	8
4	United States	5
2	Sweden	5
3	Norway	6

Gold Medal Game
1	Canada	6
3	Norway	9
Bronze Medal Game
2	Sweden	7
4	United States	6
