= James Dryburgh =

Swedish curler (born 1975)

Medal record

Men's Curling

World Junior Curling Championships
Gold medal – first place	1991 Glasgow	
Gold medal – first place	1996 Red Deer	

European Curling Championships
Gold medal – first place	1999 Chamonix	
Bronze medal – third place	1997 Füssen	

James Dryburgh (born 27 May 1975 in Inverness, Scotland) is a Swedish curler. He lives in Stockholm, where he is a physical education teacher.

Dryburgh is a two-time World Junior Champion. Playing for his native Scotland, he won gold in 1991 playing third for Alan MacDougall. In 1996, Dryburgh played skip for Scotland to earn his second gold medal.

After juniors, he played alternate for his brother, Douglas Dryburgh's team. This included a trip to the 1998 Winter Olympics, playing for Great Britain which finished 7th.

Dryburgh met his wife, Margaretha Lindahl while at the Olympics. She was the alternate for the Swedish team. Dryburgh then moved to Sweden, learned Swedish and now has citizenship there. His brother, Douglas later moved to Ireland and now skips the Irish national team. His other brother, Stewart moved to Switzerland and curls there.

While in Sweden, Dryburgh joined up with three-time World champion Peja Lindholm as his third. Dryburgh went to his first World Curling Championships with Lindholm in 2007.

In 2008, Lindholm retired from curling. Dryburgh now coaches the Danish national men's team.

He also has a daughter, Moa Dryburgh who skips the Swedish junior curling team.
