= Margaretha Lindahl =

Swedish curler

- Curler
- Other names: Margaretha Louise Lindahl
- Born: 20 October 1974 (age 52); Sveg, Sweden
Medal record
Women's curling
Representing Sweden
Olympic Games
Bronze medal – third place	1998 Nagano
World Championships
Gold medal – first place	1998 Kamloops
Gold medal – first place	1999 Saint John
European Championships
Gold medal – first place	1997 Füssen
Silver medal – second place	1996 Copenhagen
Silver medal – second place	1999 Chamonix
World Junior Championships
Silver medal – second place	1995 Perth
Bronze medal – third place	1994 Sofia
Bronze medal – third place	1996 Red Deer

Margaretha Louise Dryburgh (née Lindahl; born 20 October 1974) is a Swedish curler, world champion and Olympic medalist. She received five international medals as an alternate in Elisabet Gustafson's team, including a bronze medal at the 1998 Winter Olympics in Nagano. She skipped her own team to a silver medal at the 1999 European Curling Championships.

Lindahl met her husband, James Dryburgh, while at the Olympics 1998. He was the alternate for the Scottish team.
