= Eric Carlsén =

Swedish curler

- Curler

Team
- Curling club: Sundsvalls CK, Sundsvall
- Skip: Nils Carlsén
- Third: Eric Carlsén
- Second: Rickard Hallström
- Lead: Oskar Sjöström
- Alternate: Fredrik Carlsén
Medal record
Curling
World Junior Championships
Silver medal – second place	2002 Kelowna
Silver medal – second place	2003 Flims
European Mixed Championship
Bronze medal – third place	2008 Kitzbühel

Eric Carlsén (born 16 June 1982) is a Swedish curler from Sundsvall, Sweden.

== Curling career ==
Playing for Härnösand Curling Club, Carlsén was the Swedish national Champion for 2005 and represented Sweden as skip at the 2005 Ford World Men's Curling Championship in Victoria, British Columbia, Canada. His team finished 9th. He is a two-time silver medalist in the World Junior Curling Championships, winning silver in 2002 and 2003. He had a fifth-place finish at the 2001 Juniors. In 2008 he won the Swedish Mixed Championships together with Niklas Edin, Anette Norberg and Anna Hasselborg. The win giving them the right to represent Sweden at the European Mixed Curling Championship held in Kitzbuhel, Austria. After the Round Robin they had an impressing 7-0 Record. They lost the semifinal against Germany ending up with a Bronze medal after beating Russia 6-4 in the bronze medal game.

For the 2009-10 season, Carlsén's teammates were Per Carlsén (Skip), Nils Carlsén (Third/Second), Niklas Berggren (lead) and Mikael Norberg (lead/Third). That team won the Swedish Super League Championship 2009-2010 after defeating Niklas Edin, of Karlstad 6-5 in the final. He represented Sweden at the 2010 Capital One World Men's Curling Championship in Cortina d'Ampezzo, Italy where Sweden finished with a 4-7 record in 8th place.

== Teams ==
Season	Skip	Third	Second	Lead	Alternate
1996–97	Eric Carlsén	Carl-Axel Dahlin	Nils Carlsén	Emanuel Allberg	
1997–98	Eric Carlsén	Carl-Axel Dahlin	Nils Carlsén	Emanuel Allberg	
1998–99	Eric Carlsén	Carl-Axel Dahlin	Nils Carlsén	Emanuel Allberg	
1999–00	Eric Carlsén	Carl-Axel Dahlin	Nils Carlsén	Emanuel Allberg	
2000–01	Eric Carlsén	Carl-Axel Dahlin	Nils Carlsén	Emanuel Allberg	
2001–02	Eric Carlsén	Carl-Axel Dahlin	Nils Carlsén	Emanuel Allberg	
2002–03	Eric Carlsén	Carl-Axel Dahlin	Nils Carlsén	Emanuel Allberg	
2003–04	Marcus Feldt	Sven Olsson	Eric Carlsén	Stefan Göransson	
2004–05	Eric Carlsén	Andreas Prytz	Daniel Prytz	Patric Håkansson	
2005–06	Eric Carlsén	Andreas Prytz	Daniel Prytz	Patric Håkansson	
2006–07	Anders Hammarström	Eric Carlsén	Erik Westling	Oskar Sjöström	
2007–08	Per Carlsén	Mikael Norberg	Eric Carlsén	Niklas Berggren	
2007–08	Niklas Edin	Anette Norberg	Eric Carlsén	Anna Hasselborg	
2008–09	Per Carlsén	Mikael Norberg	Eric Carlsén	Niklas Berggren	
2009–10	Per Carlsén	Nils Carlsén	Eric Carlsén	Niklas Berggren	Mikael Norberg
2010–11	Per Carlsén	Nils Carlsén	Eric Carlsén	Mikael Norberg	
2011–12	Nils Carlsén	Eric Carlsén	Rickard Hallström	Oskar Sjöström	
2012–13	Nils Carlsén	Eric Carlsén	Rickard Hallström	Oskar Sjöström	
