= Nils Carlsén =

Swedish curler

Medal record

Curling

World Junior Championships
Gold medal – first place	2004	A Group
Silver medal – second place	2002	A Group
Silver medal – second place	2003	A Group
Silver medal – second place	2005	A Group
Silver medal – second place	2006	A Group

European Championships
Bronze medal – third place	2006	A Group

Nils Carlsén (born 21 April 1985 in Sundsvall) is a Swedish curler.

Carlsén who began curling in 1996, had been a very successful junior curler for Sweden. He has curled in six World Junior Curling Championships (2001–2006)- finishing in the top-2 in the last five. In 2001, Carlsén played lead for the Swedish team skipped by Eric Carlsén, and they finished fifth. In 2002 he played second for Eric and finished second- losing to Canada's David Hamblin in the final. In 2003 Carlsén picked up another silver medal losing to Steve Laycock of Canada. Nils once again played second for Eric. Nils returned again in 2004, this time playing third for Niklas Edin. The team won the gold medal, beating Stefan Rindisbacher of Switzerland in the final. In 2005 Nils was skipping the Swedish junior team, and he picked up another silver medal losing to Canada's Kyle George in the final. In 2006, Nils skipped Sweden to another silver medal losing to Canada's Charley Thomas.

2006 also marked Nils' first World Curling Championships. He would skip team Sweden to a fifth-place finish. He is right-handed.

== Awards ==
- WJCC All-Star Second (2003)
- WJCC All-Star Third (2004)
