= World Junior Curling Championships =

International junior curling event

- Established: 1975 (men's); 1988 (women's); 2025 (mixed doubles)
- 2027 host city: Aberdeen, Scotland (men's & women's); Edmonton, Canada (mixed doubles)
- 2027 arena: Curl Aberdeen (men's & women's); Saville Community Sports Centre (mixed doubles)
- 2026 champion: United States (men's); South Korea (women's); Japan (mixed doubles)

Current edition
- 2026 World Junior Curling Championships

The World Junior Curling Championships are an annual curling bonspiel featuring the world's best curlers who are 21 years old or younger. The men's tournament has occurred since 1975, the women's since 1988. Since curling became an Olympic sport in 1998, the Men's and Women's World Junior Curling Championship of the year preceding the Olympic Games have been held at the site of the curling tournament for the upcoming Games.

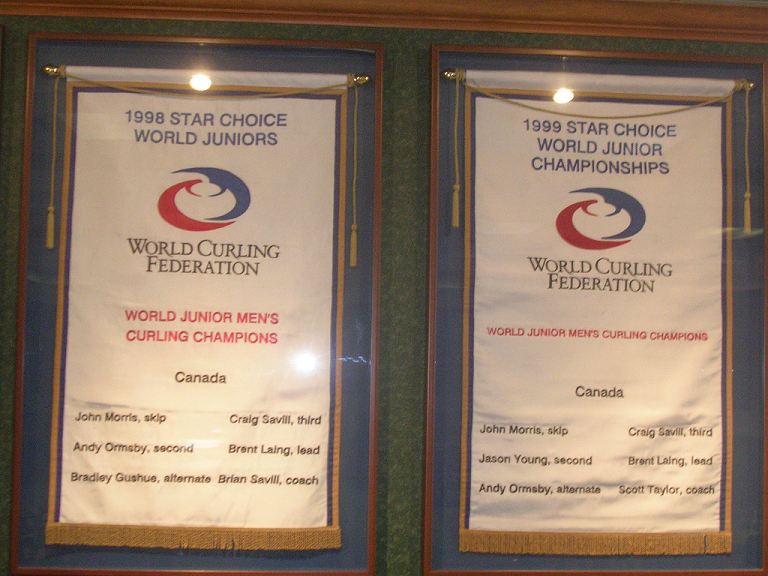
World Junior Championship banners awarded to John Morris and his two teams from 1998 and 1999.

The event had its origins with the Ontario Junior Masters Curling Championship, which began in 1968 and, at first, mostly consisted of teams in the Greater Toronto Area. Eventually the event was renamed to the International Junior Masters Bonspiel and began attracting teams from other countries. In 1973, the tournament was sponsored by Uniroyal, and was renamed the Uniroyal International Junior Curling Championship. It became the World Junior Curling Championship in 1974, before being officially sanctioned in 1975. The tournament was held every year at the East York Curling Club before being sanctioned. Uniroyal remained the event's sponsor until 1990.

Following the success of mixed doubles at the World Championships, Olympic Winter Games, as well as the Youth Olympic Games, World Curling would announce an expansion of the World Junior Championships in 2025 to include mixed doubles, which would be held later in the year than the men's and women's junior championships.

== Qualification/Format ==
=== Men's and Women's ===
Initially, teams would qualify through final rankings at the previous year's championships. If teams did not automatically qualify, they would compete through regional qualifiers. In the Europe Zone, teams participated in the European Junior Curling Challenge, in which the winner advances to the World Championships. In the Pacific Zone, teams participated in the Pacific-Asia Junior Curling Championships, in which the winner advances to the World Championships.

Starting in 2016, teams who did not qualify through final rankings at the previous year's championships would compete at the World Junior-B Curling Championships, which includes any teams that did not already qualify for the championships via the previous year's rankings. The top three teams of this tournament qualify for the main tournament, and the bottom three teams from the main tournament are then demoted to the B tournament. This type of tournament also existed from 2001 to 2004, where two teams were awarded qualification spots through the B tournament instead of three.

From 2027 onward, the World Junior Curling Championships was revamped by World Curling and underwent significant changes. The event expanded to 16 teams per gender, in which two pools of eight teams would compete in a round-robin format, with the top three teams from each pool advancing to the play-offs, while the bottom three teams overall are relegated to the World Junior-B Curling Championships. Additionally, games were shortened from ten ends to eight ends.

=== Mixed doubles ===
The mixed doubles world junior championship is an open-entry championship, open to any member association.

== Summary ==
For men's team and women's team, name of skip listed below country.

For mixed doubles, name of female curler, then male curler listed below country.

=== Men's ===
Year	Location	Final			Third Place Match
Year	Location	Champion	Score	Second Place	Third Place	Score	Fourth Place
1968 (Unofficial)	(Canada) East York	Uxbridge; Barry Timbers	–	East York; Herb Kuroda Parkway; John Chapman
1969 (Unofficial)	(Canada) East York	Leaside; John Francis	–	Tam Heather; Doug Jamieson Weston; Dave Robson			Uxbridge
1970 (Unofficial)	(Canada) East York	St. George's; Hugh McCarrel	–	Leaside; John Francis	University of Toronto; George Carr		Uxbridge; Barry Timbers
1971 (Unofficial)	(Canada) East York	Gananonque; Mark McDonald	–	Buffalo; Randy Cook Toronto Avonlea; Steve Thomas			East York St. George's
1972 (Unofficial)	(Canada) East York	Sweden; Fredrik Lundberg	–	Ontario; Mark McDonald Manitoba; Neil Gallagher
1973 (Unofficial)	(Canada) East York	Sweden; Goran Roxin	–	Canada; Mark McDonald	Manitoba; Clayton Rasmussen Switzerland; Bernhard Attinger Norway; Kristian Sorum
1974 (Unofficial)	(Canada) East York	Switzerland; Bernhard Attinger	7–6	Canada; Robb King	Sweden; Anders Thidholm	–	United States; Gary Kleffman
1975	(Canada) East York	Sweden; Jan Ullsten	8–6	Canada; Robb King	Scotland; Peter J. D. Wilson	–	Norway; Morten Sørum
1976	(Scotland) Aviemore	Canada; Paul Gowsell	4–3	Sweden; Jan Ullsten	Norway; Sjur Loen	–	Scotland; Robert Kelly
1977	(Canada) Sainte-Foy	Canada; Bill Jenkins	9–5	Sweden; Anders Grahn	United States; Donald Barcome Jr.	–	Norway; Sjur Loen
1978	(Switzerland) Grindelwald	Canada; Paul Gowsell	4–2	Sweden; Thomas Håkansson	Scotland; Colin Hamilton	–	Norway; Sjur Loen
1979	(Canada) Moose Jaw	United States; Donald Barcome Jr.	5–4	Scotland; Andrew McQuistin	Canada; Darren Fish	8–4	Norway; Sjur Loen
1980	(Canada) Kitchener	Scotland; Andrew McQuistin	5–3	Canada; Mert Thompsett	Sweden; Thomas Norgren	9–7	United States; Scott Dalziel
1981	(France) Megève	Scotland; Peter Wilson	8–5	Canada; Denis Marchand	United States; Ted Purvis	5–3	Sweden; Thomas Norgren
1982	(Canada) Fredericton	Sweden; Sören Grahn	6–2	Canada; Mert Thompsett	Scotland; Robin Gray	–	United States; Dale Risling
1983	(Canada) Medicine Hat	Canada; John Base	7–2	Norway; Pål Trulsen	Scotland; Mike Hay	6–4	United States; Al Edwards
1984	(Canada) Cornwall	United States; Al Edwards	7–6	Switzerland; André Flotron	Scotland; Mike Hay	–	Canada; Jamie Schneider
1985	(Scotland) Perth	Canada; Bob Ursel	6–5	Switzerland; Christian Saager	Scotland; Hammy McMillan	11–2	Norway; Bjørn Ulshagen
1986	(Canada) Dartmouth	Scotland; David Aitken	7–6	Canada; Kevin Martin	Sweden; Örjan Erixon	12–7	West Germany; Dieter Kolb
1987	(Canada) Esquimalt	Scotland; Douglas Dryburgh	3–2	Canada; Hugh McFadyen	Norway; Anthon Grimsmo	7–3	Switzerland; Markus Eggler
1988	(West Germany) Füssen	Canada; Jim Sullivan	4–2	Sweden; Peja Lindholm	Norway; Thomas Ulsrud	5–2	Switzerland; Christof Schwaller
1989	(Canada) Markham	Sweden; Peja Lindholm	7–2	Canada; Mike Wood	Switzerland; Markus Eggler	5–2	Scotland; Allan Manuel
1990	(Canada) Portage la Prairie	Switzerland; Stefan Traub	5–4	Scotland; Graeme Connal	Sweden; Peja Lindholm	11–1	Canada; Dean Joanisse
1991	(Scotland) Glasgow	Scotland; Alan MacDougall	5–4	Canada; Noel Herron	Switzerland; Dominic Andres United States; Eric Fenson	–	–
1992	(Germany) Oberstdorf	Switzerland; Stefan Heilman	10–8	France; Jan Henri Ducroz	Canada; Jason Repay Sweden; Joakim Carlsson	–	–
1993	(Switzerland) Grindelwald	Scotland; Craig Wilson	7–3	Canada; Michel Ferland	France; Specer Mugnier Germany; Markus Herberg	–	–
1994	(Bulgaria) Sofia	Canada; Colin Davison	6–2	Germany; Daniel Herberg	Switzerland; Yannick Renggli United States; Mike Peplinski	–	–
1995	(Scotland) Perth	Scotland; Tom Brewster	6–3	Germany; Daniel Herberg	Canada; Christopher Galbraith	9–2	Sweden; Henrik Edlund
1996	(Canada) Red Deer	Scotland; James Dryburgh	6–4	Switzerland; Ralph Stöckli	Germany; Sebastian Stock	11–3	Canada; Jeff Currie
1997	(Japan) Karuizawa	Switzerland; Ralph Stöckli	5–3	Finland; Perttu Piilo	Canada; Ryan Keane	9–6	Japan; Makoto Tsuruga
1998	(Canada) Thunder Bay	Canada; John Morris	5–3	Scotland; Gary MacKay	Switzerland; Ralph Stöckli	6–4	Germany; Sebastian Stock
1999	(Sweden) Östersund	Canada; John Morris	6–2	Switzerland; Christian Haller	United States; Andy Roza	7–5	Sweden; Patric Håkansson
2000	(Germany) Geising	Canada; Brad Kuhn	8–4	Switzerland; Patrick Vuille	Germany; Christian Baumann	9–3	Denmark; Kasper Wiksten
2001	(United States) Ogden	Canada; Brad Gushue	7–6	Denmark; Casper Bossen	United States; Andy Roza	7–5	Scotland; David Edwards
2002	(Canada) Kelowna	Canada; David Hamblin	3–2	Sweden; Eric Carlsén	Scotland; Kenny Edwards	10–3	Switzerland; Andreas Hingher
2003	(Switzerland) Flims	Canada; Steve Laycock	5–4	Sweden; Eric Carlsén	Switzerland; Jan Hauser	7–4	Norway; Thomas Løvold
2004	(Canada) Trois-Rivières	Sweden; Niklas Edin	5–4	Switzerland; Stefan Rindlisbacher	Scotland; Scott Hamilton	11–5	South Korea; Kim Soo-hyuk
2005	(Italy) Pinerolo	Canada; Kyle George	6–5	Sweden; Nils Carlsén	Scotland; Logan Gray	8–5	United States; Kristopher Perkovich
2006	(South Korea) Jeonju	Canada; Charley Thomas	7–3	Sweden; Nils Carlsén	Scotland; Logan Gray	12–4	China; Wang Binjiang
2007	(United States) Eveleth	Canada; Charley Thomas	8–3	Sweden; Niklas Edin	Switzerland; Christian von Gunten	7–6	Denmark; Rasmus Stjerne
2008	(Sweden) Östersund	United States; Chris Plys	7–5	Sweden; Oskar Eriksson	Canada; William Dion	5–3	Norway; Kristian Rolvsfjord
2009	(Canada) Vancouver	Denmark; Rasmus Stjerne	9–6	Canada; Brett Gallant	United States; Chris Plys	9–4	Sweden; Oskar Eriksson
2010	(Switzerland) Flims	Switzerland; Peter de Cruz	7–6	Scotland; Ally Fraser	Canada; Jake Walker	7–1	China; Ji Yansong
2011	(Scotland) Perth	Sweden; Oskar Eriksson	6–5	Switzerland; Peter de Cruz	Norway; Steffen Mellemseter	10–2	Canada; Braeden Moskowy
2012	(Sweden) Östersund	Canada; Brendan Bottcher	10–4	Sweden; Rasmus Wranå	Scotland; Kyle Smith	7–3	Norway; Markus Høiberg
2013	(Russia) Sochi	Scotland; Kyle Smith	6–2	Russia; Evgeny Arkhipov	Canada; Matt Dunstone	6–4	Sweden; Patric Mabergs
2014	(Switzerland) Flims	Switzerland; Yannick Schwaller	6–5	Scotland; Kyle Smith	Norway; Eirik Mjøen	7–5	Canada; Braden Calvert
2015	(Estonia) Tallinn	Canada; Braden Calvert	6–3	Switzerland; Yannick Schwaller	Scotland; Bruce Mouat	8–3	Sweden; Fredrik Nyman
2016	(Denmark) Copenhagen	Scotland; Bruce Mouat	6–3	United States; Korey Dropkin	Canada; Matt Dunstone	8–4	Switzerland; Yannick Schwaller
2017	(South Korea) Gangneung	South Korea; Lee Ki-jeong	5–4	United States; Andrew Stopera	Norway; Magnus Ramsfjell	10–3	Scotland; Cameron Bryce
2018	(Scotland) Aberdeen	Canada; Tyler Tardi	6–5	Scotland; Ross Whyte	Switzerland; Jan Hess	7–4	United States; Andrew Stopera
2019	(Canada) Liverpool	Canada; Tyler Tardi	9–4	Switzerland; Marco Hösli	Scotland; Ross Whyte	8–5	Norway; Magnus Ramsfjell
2020	(Russia) Krasnoyarsk	Canada; Jacques Gauthier	7–2	Switzerland; Marco Hösli	Scotland; James Craik	6–5	Germany; Sixten Totzek
2021	(China) Beijing	Cancelled			Cancelled
2022	(Sweden) Jönköping	Scotland; James Craik	7–1	Germany; Benny Kapp	Canada; Owen Purcell	13–4	Norway; Grunde Buraas
2023	(Germany) Füssen	China; Fei Xueqing	8–7	Germany; Benny Kapp	Scotland; Orrin Carson	11–4	Norway; Lukas Høstmælingen
2024	(Finland) Lohja	Norway; Lukas Høstmælingen	7–6	Italy; Stefano Gilli	Denmark; Jacob Schmidt	10–9	United States; Wesley Wendling
2025	(Italy) Cortina d'Ampezzo	Italy; Stefano Spiller	9–5	Norway; Lukas Høstmælingen	Scotland; Orrin Carson	7–2	South Korea; Kim Dae-hyun
2026	(Denmark) Tårnby	United States; Caden Hebert	8–6	Italy; Stefano Spiller	Scotland; Orrin Carson	9–8	Canada; Calan MacIsaac
2027	(Scotland) Aberdeen

=== Women's ===
Year	Location	Final			Third Place Match
Year	Location	Champion	Score	Second Place	Third Place	Score	Fourth Place
1988	(France) Chamonix	Canada; Julie Sutton	6–4	Switzerland; Marianne Amstutz	Denmark; Lene Bidstrup	5–2	Scotland; Carolyn Hutchison
1989	(Canada) Markham	Canada; LaDawn Funk	10–3	Norway; Trine Helgebostad	Scotland; Carolyn Hutchison	5–4	Sweden; Cathrine Norberg
1990	(Canada) Portage la Prairie	Scotland; Kirsty Addison	5–3	Sweden; Cathrine Norberg	Canada; Cathy Overton	8–1	Switzerland; Helga Oswald
1991	(Scotland) Glasgow	Sweden; Eva Eriksson	5–4	Switzerland; Nicole Strausak	Canada; Atina Ford Scotland; Gillian Barr	–	–
1992	(Germany) Oberstdorf	Scotland; Gillian Barr	10–2	United States; Erika Brown	Sweden; Eva Eriksson Switzerland; Helga Oswald	–	–
1993	(Switzerland) Grindelwald	Scotland; Kirsty Hay	9–5	Canada; Amber Holland	Denmark; Dorthe Holm United States; Erika Brown	–	–
1994	(Bulgaria) Sofia	Canada; Kim Gellard	9–7	United States; Erika Brown	Denmark; Angelina Jensen Sweden; Margaretha Lindahl	–	–
1995	(Scotland) Perth	Canada; Kelly Mackenzie	6–5	Sweden; Margaretha Lindahl	Switzerland; Nadia Heuer	8–3	Scotland; Julia Ewart
1996	(Canada) Red Deer	Canada; Heather Godberson	7–6	Scotland; Julia Ewart	Sweden; Margaretha Lindahl	11–5	Switzerland; Nadja Heuer
1997	(Japan) Karuizawa	Scotland; Julia Ewart	11–3	Sweden; Margaretha Sigfridsson	Canada; Meredith Doyle	5–2	United States; Risa O'Connell
1998	(Canada) Thunder Bay	Canada; Melissa McClure	11–3	Japan; Akiko Katoh	Sweden; Matilda Mattsson	6–5	Scotland; Julia Ewart
1999	(Sweden) Östersund	Switzerland; Silvana Tirinzoni	8–3	Japan; Akiko Katoh	Canada; Marie-France Larouche	10–3	Sweden; Matilda Mattsson
2000	(Germany) Geising	Sweden; Matilda Mattsson	6–5	Canada; Stefanie Miller	United States; Laura Delaney	8–5	Switzerland; Carmen Schäfer
2001	(United States) Ogden	Canada; Suzanne Gaudet	6–4	Sweden; Matilda Mattsson	Switzerland; Carmen Schäfer	5–4	Japan; Moe Meguro
2002	(Canada) Kelowna	United States; Cassandra Johnson	7–6	Sweden; Matilda Mattsson	Canada; Suzanne Gaudet	9–8	Italy; Diana Gaspari
2003	(Switzerland) Flims	Canada; Marliese Miller	5–4	United States; Cassandra Johnson	Italy; Diana Gaspari	7–4	Sweden; Stina Viktorsson
2004	(Canada) Trois-Rivières	Norway; Linn Githmark	9–6	Canada; Jill Mouzar	Sweden; Stina Viktorsson	7–6	United States; Aileen Sormunen
2005	(Italy) Pinerolo	Switzerland; Tania Grivel	10–2	Sweden; Stina Viktorsson	Canada; Andrea Kelly	6–4	Denmark; Madeleine Dupont
2006	(South Korea) Jeonju	Russia; Ludmila Privivkova	5–4	Canada; Mandy Selzer	Denmark; Lene Nielsen	8–4	Switzerland; Michèle Jäggi
2007	(United States) Eveleth	Scotland; Sarah Reid	7–6	Canada; Stacie Devereaux	Denmark; Madeleine Dupont	8–6	United States; Aileen Sormunen
2008	(Sweden) Östersund	Scotland; Eve Muirhead	12–3	Sweden; Cecilia Östlund	Canada; Kaitlyn Lawes	9–8	Russia; Ludmila Privivkova
2009	(Canada) Vancouver	Scotland; Eve Muirhead	8–6	Canada; Kaitlyn Lawes	Switzerland; Martina Baumann	5–4	Russia; Margarita Fomina
2010	(Switzerland) Flims	Sweden; Anna Hasselborg	8–3	Canada; Rachel Homan	United States; Alexandra Carlson	9–7	Switzerland; Manuela Siegrist
2011	(Scotland) Perth	Scotland; Eve Muirhead	10–3	Canada; Trish Paulsen	Russia; Anna Sidorova	9–3	Sweden; Jonna McManus
2012	(Sweden) Östersund	Scotland; Hannah Fleming	6–5	Czech Republic; Zuzana Hájková	Russia; Anna Sidorova	7–4	Sweden; Sara McManus
2013	(Russia) Sochi	Russia; Alina Kovaleva	6–5	Scotland; Hannah Fleming	Japan; Sayaka Yoshimura	8–4	Czech Republic; Zuzana Hájková
2014	(Switzerland) Flims	Canada; Kelsey Rocque	6–4	South Korea; Kim Kyeong-ae	Russia; Alina Kovaleva	11–4	Sweden; Isabella Wranå
2015	(Estonia) Tallinn	Canada; Kelsey Rocque	8–2	Scotland; Gina Aitken	Switzerland; Elena Stern	7–6	Sweden; Isabella Wranå
2016	(Denmark) Copenhagen	Canada; Mary Fay	7–4	United States; Cory Christensen	South Korea; Kim Min-ji	8–4	Hungary; Dorottya Palancsa
2017	(South Korea) Gangneung	Sweden; Isabella Wranå	10–7	Scotland; Sophie Jackson	Canada; Kristen Streifel	6–3	South Korea; Kim Min-ji
2018	(Scotland) Aberdeen	Canada; Kaitlyn Jones	7–4	Sweden; Isabella Wranå	China; Wang Zixin	11–5	Norway; Maia Ramsfjell
2019	(Canada) Liverpool	Russia; Vlada Rumiantseva	8–7	Canada; Selena Sturmay	Switzerland; Raphaela Keiser	6–4	China; Jiang Jiayi
2020	(Russia) Krasnoyarsk	Canada; Mackenzie Zacharias	7–5	South Korea; Kim Min-ji	Russia; Vlada Rumiantseva	14–4	Japan; Sae Yamamoto
2021	(China) Beijing	Cancelled			Cancelled
2022	(Sweden) Jönköping	Japan; Sae Yamamoto	7–4	Sweden; Moa Dryburgh	United States; Delaney Strouse	10–6	Norway; Eirin Mesloe
2023	(Germany) Füssen	Scotland; Fay Henderson	9–7	Japan; Yuina Miura	Norway; Torild Bjørnstad	8–5	Switzerland; Xenia Schwaller
2024	(Finland) Lohja	Switzerland; Xenia Schwaller	10–3	Japan; Momoha Tabata	Norway; Torild Bjørnstad	7–5	Canada; Myla Plett
2025	(Italy) Cortina d'Ampezzo	South Korea; Kang Bo-bae	8–2	Germany; Sara Messenzehl	Canada; Allyson MacNutt	7–4	Sweden; Moa Dryburgh
2026	(Denmark) Tårnby	South Korea; Kang Bo-bae	14–7	Sweden; Moa Dryburgh	China; Wang Zhuoyi	11–4	United States; Allory Johnson
2027	(Scotland) Aberdeen

=== Mixed doubles ===
Year	Location	Final			Third Place Match
Year	Location	Champion	Score	Second Place	Third Place	Score	Fourth Place
2025	(Canada) Edmonton	Italy; Lucrezia Grande; Stefano Spiller	8–2	Denmark; Katrine Schmidt; Jacob Schmidt	South Korea; Kang Bo-bae; Kim Hak-jun	6–5	Sweden; Moa Dryburgh; Vilmer Nygren
2026	(Canada) Edmonton	Japan; Yuina Miura; Kaito Fujii	6–5	Canada; Brooklyn Ideson; Owen Henry	Scotland; Tia Laurie; Ethan Brewster	10–7	Denmark; Katrine Schmidt; Jacob Schmidt
2027	(Canada) Edmonton

== All-time Medal Tables ==
Men's

As of 2026 World Junior Curling Championships

Rank	Nation	Gold	Silver	Bronze	Total
1	Canada	21	10	9	40
2	Scotland	11	6	17	34
3	Sweden	5	11	4	20
4	Switzerland	5	10	7	22
5	United States	4	2	7	13
6	Norway	1	2	6	9
7	Italy	1	2	0	3
8	Denmark	1	1	1	3
9	China	1	0	0	1
9	South Korea	1	0	0	1
11	Germany	0	4	3	7
12	France	0	1	1	2
13	Finland	0	1	0	1
13	Russia	0	1	0	1
Totals (14 entries)		51	51	55	157

Women's

As of 2026 World Junior Curling Championships

Rank	Nation	Gold	Silver	Bronze	Total
1	Canada	13	9	9	31
2	Scotland	10	4	2	16
3	Sweden	4	10	5	19
4	Switzerland	3	2	6	11
5	Russia	3	0	4	7
6	South Korea	2	2	1	5
7	United States	1	4	4	9
8	Japan	1	4	1	6
9	Norway	1	1	2	4
10	Czech Republic	0	1	0	1
10	Germany	0	1	0	1
12	Denmark	0	0	5	5
13	China	0	0	2	2
14	Italy	0	0	1	1
Totals (14 entries)		38	38	42	118

Mixed doubles

As of 2026 World Junior Mixed Doubles Curling Championship

Rank	Nation	Gold	Silver	Bronze	Total
1	Italy	1	0	0	1
1	Japan	1	0	0	1
3	Canada	0	1	0	1
3	Denmark	0	1	0	1
5	Scotland	0	0	1	1
5	South Korea	0	0	1	1
Totals (6 entries)		2	2	2	6

Overall

As of 2026 events

Rank	Nation	Gold	Silver	Bronze	Total
1	Canada	34	20	18	72
2	Scotland	21	10	20	51
3	Sweden	9	21	9	39
4	Switzerland	8	12	13	33
5	United States	5	6	11	22
6	South Korea	3	2	2	7
7	Russia	3	1	4	8
8	Japan	2	4	1	7
9	Norway	2	3	8	13
10	Italy	2	2	1	5
11	Denmark	1	2	6	9
12	China	1	0	2	3
13	Germany	0	5	3	8
14	France	0	1	1	2
15	Czech Republic	0	1	0	1
15	Finland	0	1	0	1
Totals (16 entries)		91	91	99	281

== Performance timeline ==
=== Men ===
Country	1970s					1980s										1990s										2000s										2010s										2020s							Years
Country	75	76	77	78	79	80	81	82	83	84	85	86	87	88	89	90	91	92	93	94	95	96	97	98	99	00	01	02	03	04	05	06	07	08	09	10	11	12	13	14	15	16	17	18	19	20	22	23	24	25	26	27	Years
Austria																																								8													1
Bulgaria																				10																																	1
Canada	2nd place, silver medalist(s)	1st place, gold medalist(s)	1st place, gold medalist(s)	1st place, gold medalist(s)	3rd place, bronze medalist(s)	2nd place, silver medalist(s)	2nd place, silver medalist(s)	2nd place, silver medalist(s)	1st place, gold medalist(s)	4	1st place, gold medalist(s)	2nd place, silver medalist(s)	2nd place, silver medalist(s)	1st place, gold medalist(s)	2nd place, silver medalist(s)	4	2nd place, silver medalist(s)	3rd place, bronze medalist(s)	2nd place, silver medalist(s)	1st place, gold medalist(s)	3rd place, bronze medalist(s)	4	3rd place, bronze medalist(s)	1st place, gold medalist(s)	1st place, gold medalist(s)	1st place, gold medalist(s)	1st place, gold medalist(s)	1st place, gold medalist(s)	1st place, gold medalist(s)	5	1st place, gold medalist(s)	1st place, gold medalist(s)	1st place, gold medalist(s)	3rd place, bronze medalist(s)	2nd place, silver medalist(s)	3rd place, bronze medalist(s)	4	1st place, gold medalist(s)	3rd place, bronze medalist(s)	4	1st place, gold medalist(s)	3rd place, bronze medalist(s)	5	1st place, gold medalist(s)	1st place, gold medalist(s)	1st place, gold medalist(s)	3rd place, bronze medalist(s)	8	7	7	4	Q	52
China																																4	9	8	8	4	7	7	9	10			9	8	9			1st place, gold medalist(s)	9				14
Czech Republic																									7	10							10	10			9	8	10														7
Denmark		9	9	8	6	6	6	9	5	9	10	7	8	5	10		5	9	7	8	8	9	5	9		4	2nd place, silver medalist(s)	7	8	10	5	5	4	7	1st place, gold medalist(s)	8	10					8							3rd place, bronze medalist(s)	5	7	Q	39
England																			8					8	10																												3
Estonia																																									10												1
Finland																10					9		2nd place, silver medalist(s)	10					9							7	8	10															8
France	8	5	6	9	9	8	9	7	9	8	8	9	9	9	9	9	9	2nd place, silver medalist(s)	3rd place, bronze medalist(s)	7	10						10																										22
Germany	7	7	10	6	10	5	5	8	8	7	7	4	5	8	7	5	6	7	3rd place, bronze medalist(s)	2nd place, silver medalist(s)	2nd place, silver medalist(s)	3rd place, bronze medalist(s)	6	4	6	3rd place, bronze medalist(s)	8	6	7	8	9		8	6	10									5	7	4	2nd place, silver medalist(s)	2nd place, silver medalist(s)	5	10			41
Italy	9	10	8	10	8	10	10	10	10	10	9	10	10	10	8	8	10					10								7	10	10						9	6	5	8		8		10	9	8	5	2nd place, silver medalist(s)	1st place, gold medalist(s)	2nd place, silver medalist(s)	Q	34
Japan																		10	10	9	6	7	4	5	7	5	6	10	6	9																				6	8	Q	16
New Zealand																																													6	8	10		10				4
Norway	4	3rd place, bronze medalist(s)	4	4	4	9	6	6	2nd place, silver medalist(s)	5	4	6	3rd place, bronze medalist(s)	3rd place, bronze medalist(s)	5	6	8	8				5	10		7	9		8	4	6	5	5	7	4	5	5	3rd place, bronze medalist(s)	4	5	3rd place, bronze medalist(s)	6	5	3rd place, bronze medalist(s)	6	4	10	4	4	1st place, gold medalist(s)	2nd place, silver medalist(s)	6	Q	47
Poland																																																			10	Q	2
Russia																											9	5	10						7	10			2nd place, silver medalist(s)	7	9	7		10		6							11
Scotland	3rd place, bronze medalist(s)	4	7	3rd place, bronze medalist(s)	2nd place, silver medalist(s)	1st place, gold medalist(s)	1st place, gold medalist(s)	3rd place, bronze medalist(s)	3rd place, bronze medalist(s)	3rd place, bronze medalist(s)	3rd place, bronze medalist(s)	1st place, gold medalist(s)	1st place, gold medalist(s)	5	4	2nd place, silver medalist(s)	1st place, gold medalist(s)	6	1st place, gold medalist(s)	5	1st place, gold medalist(s)	1st place, gold medalist(s)	7	2nd place, silver medalist(s)	5	6	4	3rd place, bronze medalist(s)	5	3rd place, bronze medalist(s)	3rd place, bronze medalist(s)	3rd place, bronze medalist(s)	6	9	9	2nd place, silver medalist(s)	5	3rd place, bronze medalist(s)	1st place, gold medalist(s)	2nd place, silver medalist(s)	3rd place, bronze medalist(s)	1st place, gold medalist(s)	4	2nd place, silver medalist(s)	3rd place, bronze medalist(s)	3rd place, bronze medalist(s)	1st place, gold medalist(s)	3rd place, bronze medalist(s)	6	3rd place, bronze medalist(s)	3rd place, bronze medalist(s)	Q	52
South Korea																														4	8	5									7	10	1st place, gold medalist(s)	9			7	9		4	9	Q	12
Sweden	1st place, gold medalist(s)	2nd place, silver medalist(s)	2nd place, silver medalist(s)	2nd place, silver medalist(s)	7	3rd place, bronze medalist(s)	4	1st place, gold medalist(s)	7	6	5	3rd place, bronze medalist(s)	7	2nd place, silver medalist(s)	1st place, gold medalist(s)	3rd place, bronze medalist(s)	7	3rd place, bronze medalist(s)	6	6	4	8	8	5	4	6	5	2nd place, silver medalist(s)	2nd place, silver medalist(s)	1st place, gold medalist(s)	2nd place, silver medalist(s)	2nd place, silver medalist(s)	2nd place, silver medalist(s)	2nd place, silver medalist(s)	4	6	1st place, gold medalist(s)	2nd place, silver medalist(s)	4	6	4	6	7	7	8	5	9						47
Switzerland	6	8	5	7	5	7	6	5	6	2nd place, silver medalist(s)	2nd place, silver medalist(s)	5	4	4	3rd place, bronze medalist(s)	1st place, gold medalist(s)	3rd place, bronze medalist(s)	1st place, gold medalist(s)	5	3rd place, bronze medalist(s)	7	2nd place, silver medalist(s)	1st place, gold medalist(s)	3rd place, bronze medalist(s)	2nd place, silver medalist(s)	2nd place, silver medalist(s)	7	4	3rd place, bronze medalist(s)	2nd place, silver medalist(s)	5	8	3rd place, bronze medalist(s)	5	6	1st place, gold medalist(s)	2nd place, silver medalist(s)	6	8	1st place, gold medalist(s)	2nd place, silver medalist(s)	4	6	3rd place, bronze medalist(s)	2nd place, silver medalist(s)	2nd place, silver medalist(s)	5	6	8	8	5	Q	52
Turkey																																										9	10					10					3
United States	5	6	3rd place, bronze medalist(s)	5	1st place, gold medalist(s)	4	3rd place, bronze medalist(s)	4	4	1st place, gold medalist(s)	6	8	6	5	6	7	3rd place, bronze medalist(s)	5	9	3rd place, bronze medalist(s)	5	6	9	5	3rd place, bronze medalist(s)	6	3rd place, bronze medalist(s)	9			4	9	5	1st place, gold medalist(s)	3rd place, bronze medalist(s)	9	6	5	7	9	5	2nd place, silver medalist(s)	2nd place, silver medalist(s)	4	5	7	6	7	4	9	1st place, gold medalist(s)	Q	50

=== Women ===
Country	1980s		1990s										2000s										2010s										2020s							Years
Country	88	89	90	91	92	93	94	95	96	97	98	99	00	01	02	03	04	05	06	07	08	09	10	11	12	13	14	15	16	17	18	19	20	22	23	24	25	26	27	Years
Bulgaria							10																																	1
Canada	1st place, gold medalist(s)	1st place, gold medalist(s)	3rd place, bronze medalist(s)	3rd place, bronze medalist(s)	5	2nd place, silver medalist(s)	1st place, gold medalist(s)	1st place, gold medalist(s)	1st place, gold medalist(s)	3rd place, bronze medalist(s)	1st place, gold medalist(s)	3rd place, bronze medalist(s)	2nd place, silver medalist(s)	1st place, gold medalist(s)	3rd place, bronze medalist(s)	1st place, gold medalist(s)	2nd place, silver medalist(s)	3rd place, bronze medalist(s)	2nd place, silver medalist(s)	2nd place, silver medalist(s)	3rd place, bronze medalist(s)	2nd place, silver medalist(s)	2nd place, silver medalist(s)	2nd place, silver medalist(s)	6	9	1st place, gold medalist(s)	1st place, gold medalist(s)	1st place, gold medalist(s)	3rd place, bronze medalist(s)	1st place, gold medalist(s)	2nd place, silver medalist(s)	1st place, gold medalist(s)	9	8	4	3rd place, bronze medalist(s)	6	Q	39
China																		9	9	8			7								3rd place, bronze medalist(s)	4				7	5	3rd place, bronze medalist(s)	Q	10
Czech Republic								10												9		7	8	9	2nd place, silver medalist(s)	4	7	10												9
Denmark	3rd place, bronze medalist(s)	9	8	6	8	3rd place, bronze medalist(s)	3rd place, bronze medalist(s)	9	7	6	10			9			6	4	3rd place, bronze medalist(s)	3rd place, bronze medalist(s)	5	8				6	10						6	10				8	Q	24
England																												9												1
Estonia																												8												1
Finland						7																																		1
France	7	8	7	7	7	8			9	9	7	7	10									9	6	10																14
Germany	9	7	10	10	9		8	5	8	8	9	9	9	10	5	10					10		9												9	6	2nd place, silver medalist(s)	10	Q	22
Hungary																													4	9			10							3
Italy		10	9	9											4	3rd place, bronze medalist(s)	9	8		10					9		9										10			11
Japan					10	10	9	7	5	5	2nd place, silver medalist(s)	2nd place, silver medalist(s)	5	4	10	5	8				7	10		8	5	3rd place, bronze medalist(s)			10	8		9	4	1st place, gold medalist(s)	2nd place, silver medalist(s)	2nd place, silver medalist(s)	8	7	Q	28
Latvia																																	7	6	10		9			4
Norway	5	2nd place, silver medalist(s)	5	8	6	6	5	8	6	10	8	8	8	8	9	8	1st place, gold medalist(s)	6	5	6	9			7	7	10					4	7	8	4	3rd place, bronze medalist(s)	3rd place, bronze medalist(s)	7			31
Russia												10	7	6	8	9	10	5	1st place, gold medalist(s)	7	4	4	5	3rd place, bronze medalist(s)	3rd place, bronze medalist(s)	1st place, gold medalist(s)	3rd place, bronze medalist(s)	7	7	6	8	1st place, gold medalist(s)	3rd place, bronze medalist(s)							22
Scotland	4	3rd place, bronze medalist(s)	1st place, gold medalist(s)	3rd place, bronze medalist(s)	1st place, gold medalist(s)	1st place, gold medalist(s)	7	4	2nd place, silver medalist(s)	1st place, gold medalist(s)	4	5	6	5	5	7	7	7	7	1st place, gold medalist(s)	1st place, gold medalist(s)	1st place, gold medalist(s)	10	1st place, gold medalist(s)	1st place, gold medalist(s)	2nd place, silver medalist(s)	8	2nd place, silver medalist(s)	9	2nd place, silver medalist(s)	9	10		7	1st place, gold medalist(s)	9			Q	36
South Korea																			6								2nd place, silver medalist(s)	6	3rd place, bronze medalist(s)	4	6	5	2nd place, silver medalist(s)	8	6	8	1st place, gold medalist(s)	1st place, gold medalist(s)	Q	14
Sweden	6	4	2nd place, silver medalist(s)	1st place, gold medalist(s)	3rd place, bronze medalist(s)	5	3rd place, bronze medalist(s)	2nd place, silver medalist(s)	3rd place, bronze medalist(s)	2nd place, silver medalist(s)	3rd place, bronze medalist(s)	4	1st place, gold medalist(s)	2nd place, silver medalist(s)	2nd place, silver medalist(s)	4	3rd place, bronze medalist(s)	2nd place, silver medalist(s)	8		2nd place, silver medalist(s)	6	1st place, gold medalist(s)	4	4	5	4	4	5	1st place, gold medalist(s)	2nd place, silver medalist(s)	6	9	2nd place, silver medalist(s)	5	5	4	2nd place, silver medalist(s)	Q	38
Switzerland	2nd place, silver medalist(s)	5	4	2nd place, silver medalist(s)	3rd place, bronze medalist(s)	9	6	3rd place, bronze medalist(s)	4	7	6	1st place, gold medalist(s)	4	3rd place, bronze medalist(s)	5	6	5	1st place, gold medalist(s)	4	5	6	3rd place, bronze medalist(s)	4	6	8	8	5	3rd place, bronze medalist(s)	6	5	7	3rd place, bronze medalist(s)	5	5	4	1st place, gold medalist(s)	6	5	Q	39
Turkey																													8	10	10					10		9	Q	6
United States	8	6	6	5	2nd place, silver medalist(s)	3rd place, bronze medalist(s)	2nd place, silver medalist(s)	6	10	4	5	6	3rd place, bronze medalist(s)	7	1st place, gold medalist(s)	2nd place, silver medalist(s)	4	10	10	4	8	5	3rd place, bronze medalist(s)	5	10	7	6	5	2nd place, silver medalist(s)	7	5	8		3rd place, bronze medalist(s)	7			4	Q	36

=== Mixed doubles ===
Country	2020s			Years
Country	25	26	27	Years
Australia	24	16		2
Austria	20	18		2
Brazil	27	26		2
Canada	12	2nd place, silver medalist(s)		2
China	11	11		2
Czech Republic	18	5		2
Denmark	2nd place, silver medalist(s)	4		2
England	13	15		2
Finland		17		1
France		25		1
Germany	5	5		2
Hong Kong	26	29		2
Hungary	15	24		2
Italy	1st place, gold medalist(s)	12		2
Japan	10	1st place, gold medalist(s)		2
Kazakhstan		20		1
Kenya	29	28		2
Latvia	14			1
New Zealand	21	22		2
Nigeria	28			1
Norway	9	5		2
Philippines		21		1
Poland	16	23		2
Romania	25	19		2
Scotland	5	3rd place, bronze medalist(s)		2
Slovenia	23	27		2
South Korea	3rd place, bronze medalist(s)	5		2
Spain	19	14		2
Sweden	4	9		2
Switzerland	5	10		2
Turkey	22			1
Ukraine	17			1
United States	5	13		2

== Records ==
Overall medal records across all disciplines (male curler)
Achievement	Curler	Country	Record	Years	
Achievement	Curler	Country	Record	Men's	Mixed doubles
Most titles	Paul Gowsell	Canada	2	1976, 1978	—N/a
Most titles	Kelly Stearne	Canada	2	1976, 1978	—N/a
Most titles	James Dryburgh	Scotland	2	1991, 1996	—N/a
Most titles	Ronald Brewster	Scotland	2	1995–1996	—N/a
Most titles	David Murdoch	Scotland	2	1995–1996	—N/a
Most titles	John Morris	Canada	2	1998–1999	—N/a
Most titles	Craig Savill	Canada	2	1998–1999	—N/a
Most titles	Brent Laing	Canada	2	1998–1999	—N/a
Most titles	Andy Ormsby	Canada	2	1998–1999	—N/a
Most titles	Brad Gushue	Canada	2	1998, 2001	—N/a
Most titles	Charley Thomas	Canada	2	2006–2007	—N/a
Most titles	Matthew Ng	Canada	2	2006–2007	—N/a
Most titles	Kyle Reynolds	Canada	2	2006–2007	—N/a
Most titles	Geoff Walker	Canada	2	2006–2007	—N/a
Most titles	Tyler Tardi	Canada	2	2018–2019	—N/a
Most titles	Sterling Middleton	Canada	2	2018–2019	—N/a
Most titles	Jacques Gauthier	Canada	2	2018, 2020	—N/a
Most titles	Stefano Spiller	Italy	2	2025	2025
Most finals/medals	Nils Carlsén	Sweden	5	2002–2006	—N/a
Most finals/medals	Emanuel Allberg	Sweden	5	2002–2003, 2005–2007	—N/a

Overall medal records across all disciplines (female curler)
Achievement	Curler	Country	Record	Years	
Achievement	Curler	Country	Record	Women's	Mixed doubles
Most titles	Eve Muirhead	Scotland	4	2007–2009, 2011	—N/a
Most finals	Eve Muirhead	Scotland	4	2007–2009, 2011	—N/a
Most finals	Karlee Burgess	Canada	4	2016, 2018–2020	—N/a
Most finals	Yuina Miura	Japan	4	2022–2024	2026
Most medals	Karlee Burgess	Canada	5	2016–2020	—N/a

== Junior Sportsmanship Awards ==
The Junior Sportsmanship Award is presented to the curler who best displayed skill, honesty, fair play, friendship and sportsmanship during the World Junior Curling Championships. The winner is selected by his/her fellow curlers in the tournament.

Year	Men's winner	Country	Women's winner	Country
1975	Claude Feige	France	—N/a	
1976	Massimo Alverà	Italy	—N/a	
1977	Donald Barcome Jr.	United States	—N/a	
1978	Colin Hamilton	Scotland	—N/a	
1979	Andrew McQuistin	Scotland	—N/a	
1980	Andrew McQuistin	Scotland	—N/a	
1981	Peter Wilson	Scotland	—N/a	
1982	Cristoph Möckel	West Germany	—N/a	
1983	Mike Hay	Scotland	—N/a	
1984	Al Edwards	United States	—N/a	
1985	Roger Schnee	United States	—N/a	
1986	David Aitken	Scotland	—N/a	
1987	Jonathan Mead	Canada	—N/a	
1988	Derek Brown	Scotland	—N/a	
1989	Brian Benkjaer	Denmark	Sandy Symyrozum	Canada
1990	Peja Lindholm	Sweden	Cecilie Torhaug	Norway
1991	Marco Alberti	Italy	Dorthe Holm	Denmark
1992	Takashi Hara	Japan	Mayumi Ohmura	Japan
1993	Takashi Hara	Japan	Dorthe Holm	Denmark
1994	Daniel Herberg	Germany	Gerrit Müller	Germany
1995	Christopher Galbraith	Canada	Gerrit Müller	Germany
1996	James Dryburgh	Scotland	Nadja Heuer	Switzerland
1997	Scott Pfeifer	Canada	Nadia Benier	France
1998	Makoto Tsuruga	Japan	Marianne Rørvik	Norway
1999	Daniel Jaeggi	England	Henriette Løvar	Norway
2000	Richard Woods	Scotland	Laura Delaney	United States
2001	Mike Adam	Canada	Stefanie Richard	Canada
2002	Christoffer Svae	Norway	Mari Motohashi	Japan
2003	David Robertson	Scotland	Marliese Miller	Canada
2004	Joël Retornaz	Italy	Anna Viktorsson	Sweden
2005	Kim Soo-hyuk	South Korea	Marte Bakk	Norway
2006	Logan Gray	Scotland	Jordan Moulton	United States
2007	Niklas Edin	Sweden	Marte Bakk	Norway
2008	Matthew Hamilton	United States	Anneline Skårsmoen	Norway
2009	Markus Høiberg	Norway	Agnes Knochenhauer	Sweden
2010	Aaron Tasa	United States	Marie Coulot	France
2011	Roger Gulka	Switzerland	Anna Li	France
2012	Sander Rølvåg	Norway	Jocelyn Peterman	Canada
2013	Tom Howell	United States	Sara McManus	Sweden
2014	Sebastian Wunderer	Austria	Zuzana Hájková	Czech Republic
2015	Gaute Nepstad	Norway	Niamh Fenton	England
2016	Fredrik Nyman	Sweden	Mary Fay	Canada
2017	Magnus Trulsen	Norway	Jennie Wåhlin	Sweden
2018	Magnus Ramsfjell	Norway	Amy MacDonald	Scotland
2019	Joshua Sutor	Germany	Maria Larsson	Sweden
2020	Anton Hood	New Zealand	Maia Ramsfjell	Norway
2022	Darcy Nevill	New Zealand	Eirin Mesloe	Norway
2023	Marius Kleinas	United States	Elisa Scheuerl	Germany
2024	Lukas Høstmælingen	Norway	Kaylee Raniseth	Canada
2025	Jacob Schmidt	Denmark	Kim Sutor	Germany
2026	Caden Hebert	United States	Lee You-sun	South Korea
2027				
