= Niklas Edin =

Swedish curler (born 1985)

- Curler
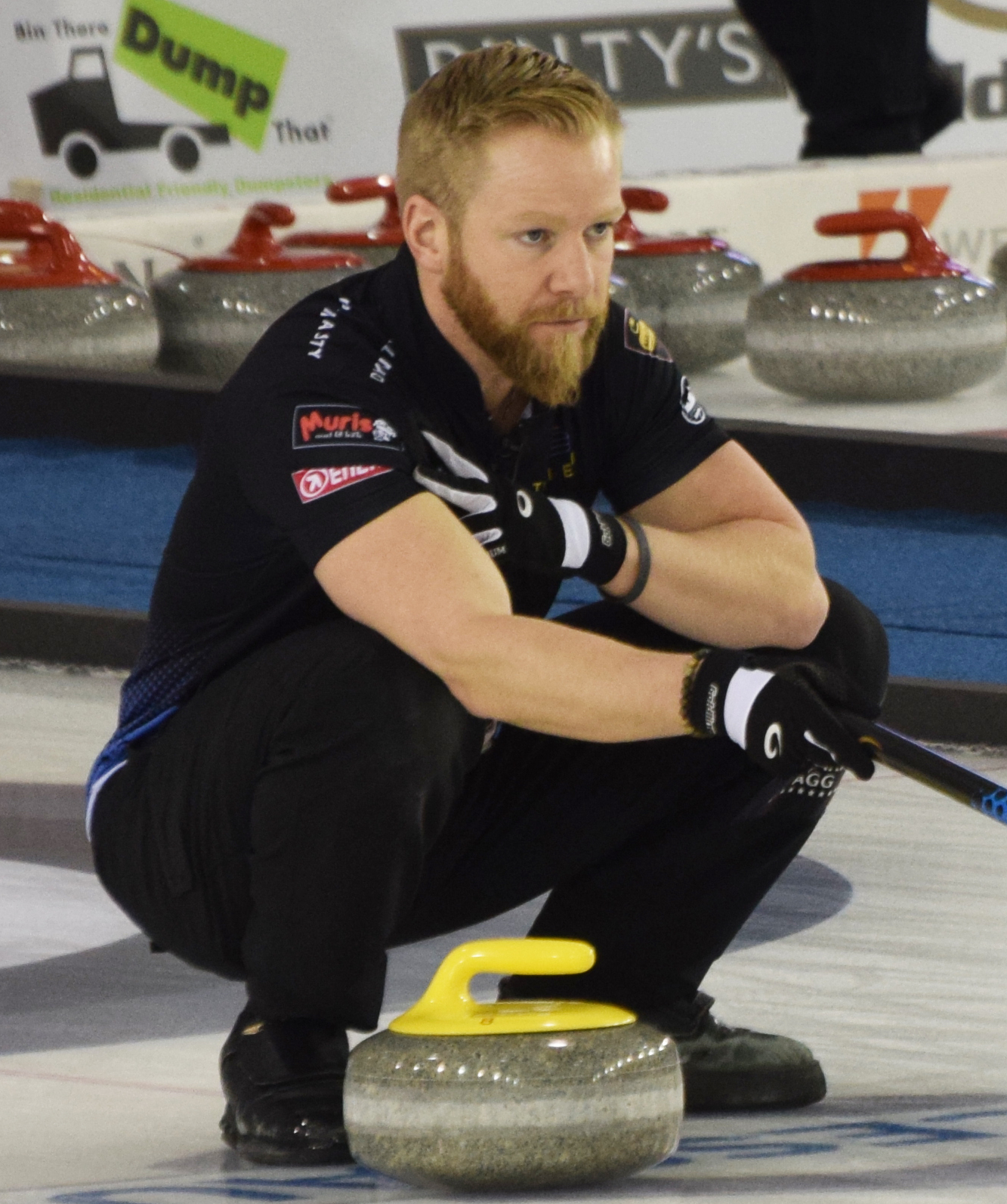
- Edin during 2018 WCT Arctic Cup
- Born: 6 July 1985 (age 41); Örnsköldsvik, Sweden

Team
- Curling club: Karlstads CK, Karlstad, SWE

Curling career
- Member Association: Sweden
- World Championship: 15 (2006, 2011, 2012, 2013, 2015, 2016, 2017, 2018, 2019, 2021, 2022, 2023, 2024, 2025, 2026)
- European Championship: 15 (2009, 2010, 2011, 2012, 2013, 2014, 2015, 2016, 2017, 2018, 2019, 2021, 2023, 2024, 2025)
- Olympic: 5 (2010, 2014, 2018, 2022, 2026)
- Grand Slam victories: 4 (2016 Masters, 2016 Tour Challenge, 2017 Players', 2022 Tour Challenge)
Medal record
Men's curling
Representing Sweden
Olympic Games
Gold medal – first place	2022 Beijing	Team
Silver medal – second place	2018 Pyeongchang	Team
Bronze medal – third place	2014 Sochi	Team
World Championships
Gold medal – first place	2013 Victoria
Gold medal – first place	2015 Halifax
Gold medal – first place	2018 Las Vegas
Gold medal – first place	2019 Lethbridge
Gold medal – first place	2021 Calgary
Gold medal – first place	2022 Las Vegas
Gold medal – first place	2024 Schaffhausen
Gold medal – first place	2026 Ogden
Silver medal – second place	2017 Edmonton
Bronze medal – third place	2011 Regina
Bronze medal – third place	2012 Basel
European Championships
Gold medal – first place	2009 Aberdeen
Gold medal – first place	2012 Karlstad
Gold medal – first place	2014 Champéry
Gold medal – first place	2015 Esbjerg
Gold medal – first place	2016 Renfrewshire
Gold medal – first place	2017 St Gallen
Gold medal – first place	2019 Helsingborg
Gold medal – first place	2025 Lohja
Silver medal – second place	2011 Moscow
Silver medal – second place	2018 Tallinn
Silver medal – second place	2021 Lillehammer
Silver medal – second place	2023 Aberdeen
European Mixed Championship
Silver medal – second place	2005 Andorra
Bronze medal – third place	2008 Kitzbühel
Swedish Men's Championship
Gold medal – first place	2009 Östersund
Gold medal – first place	2010 Karlstad
Gold medal – first place	2015 Örebro
Gold medal – first place	2016 Piteå
Gold medal – first place	2018 Skellefteå
Gold medal – first place	2019 Jönköping
Gold medal – first place	2020 Jönköping
Swedish Mixed Doubles Championship
Silver medal – second place	2017 Norrköping
Bronze medal – third place	2009 Danderyd
World Junior Championships
Gold medal – first place	2004 Trois-Rivières
Silver medal – second place	2005 Pinerolo
Silver medal – second place	2006 Jeonju
Silver medal – second place	2007 Eveleth
Universiade
Gold medal – first place	2009 Harbin

Johan Niklas Edin (born 6 July 1985) is a retired Swedish curler. He holds several sport distinctions. He is the first and the only skip in World Curling Federation (WCF) history to win three Olympic medals – gold (2022), silver (2018), and bronze (2014). He is also the only curler to skip men's curling teams to eight World Men's Curling Championship gold medals (2013, 2015, 2018, 2019, 2021, 2022, 2024, 2026).

Edin is an eight-time European Curling Championship titleholder (2009, 2012, 2014–2017, 2019, 2025) and won four silver medals in those championships (2011, 2018, 2021, 2023). He is currently tied with his teammate Oskar Eriksson in first place on the WCF-recognized list of championship medals, with thirty-eight in total. He reached the playoffs in forty-eight Grand Slam of Curling events and won the Pinty's Cup with his current teammates, Oskar Eriksson, Rasmus Wranå, and Christopher Sundgren.

With the same lineup in 2022, Edin and his teammates also became the first and only men's curling team to win a fourth consecutive World Men's Curling Championship. Edin has played exclusively in the position of skip since 2007. Throughout his career, the team bearing his name has been one of the top ranked rinks on the World Curling Tour and was often the top ranked team in the world. He currently resides in Karlstad, which has been his curling home base since 2008.

== Career ==
=== Beginnings ===
Niklas Edin participated in as many as ten different sports simultaneously before he took up curling. He started curling in 1999, inspired in part by the Swedish women's team skipped by Elisabet Gustafson when they secured the bronze medal at the 1998 Winter Olympics. Five years later in 2004, Edin skipped his own team to a World Junior Curling Championship title for Sweden, defeating the team skipped by Stefan Rindlisbacher for Switzerland. The following year, Edin was selected as the alternate for the silver medal-winning Swedish team skipped by Nils Carlsén at the World Junior Curling Championships. Edin also skipped a new team in 2005 to a silver medal at the European Mixed Curling Championships, together with future longtime teammate Sebastian Kraupp. In 2006, Edin won a second silver medal at the World Junior Curling Championships, this time playing third for Team Carlsén. The team also qualified for the 2006 World Men's Curling Championship, finishing in fifth place.

Over the next two years, Edin proved his skills with a variety of teams on an international level. In 2007, Edin skipped a new team, playing this time with his future teammates in the senior division Fredrik Lindberg and Kristian Lindström at the World Junior Championships, winning his third silver junior championship medal. In 2008, Edin also skipped yet another team to the bronze medal at the 2008 European Mixed Curling Championships, with Anna Hasselborg playing third. In 2007 and 2008, Edin joined up with Team Scotland to represent Sweden in the Continental Cup and was the only participant from Sweden in 2007. As Sweden has participated in the Cup every other year, Edin's 2007 appearance has ensured that Sweden is the only European country to appear in every Continental Cup.

=== Team Edin I (2008–2014) ===
In the spring of 2008, Edin moved to Karlstad along with Sebastian Kraupp, Fredrik Lindberg, and Viktor Kjäll to form a new team, choosing the Karlstad Curling Club as their curling home. Together, the new team filled the void in Swedish men's curling left by the retirement of Peja Lindholm and quickly became seen in Sweden as the team most likely to have success on the international curling circuit. In 2009, Team Edin won Sweden's Elite Series as well as the Swedish National Championship. The team also represented Sweden at the Winter Universiade and won the gold medal. That same season, Team Sweden, led by Mattias Mabergs, finished in 8th place at the 2008 European Curling Championships and fell short in two of three tight games against Finland in the relegation challenge for the 2009 World Men's Curling Championship. No Swedish team, therefore, could compete at the world championships that year.

In the 2009–2010 season, Team Edin was considered the frontrunner for Sweden's national team. In December 2009, the team won the gold medal at the 2009 European Curling Championships, their first appearance at the championship. During the 2010 Elite Series, however, they lost a tough final to their closest rivals, Team Carlsén, by the score of 6–5. Team Carlsén was selected for the 2010 World Men's Curling Championship but underperformed with a 4–7 loss. Team Edin was selected to participate in the 2010 Winter Olympics. They barely missed the medal platform, placing fourth and losing the bronze medal game to Switzerland. They also cemented their status over their closest rivals Team Carlsén by winning the Swedish Curling Championships.

Team Edin's 2010–11 season continued to advance their status as the top team in Sweden by winning Sweden's Elite Series championships. On the World Curling Tour, the team also started strongly by winning the Oslo Cup and making the finals of the Baden Masters. At the 2010 European Curling Championships, the team was unable to secure a playoff spot but made up for this by winning a bronze medal at the 2011 World Men's Curling Championship. On the World Curling Tour, Team Edin also made it to two Grand Slam quarterfinals – the Masters and the National – as well as the Perth Masters semifinals. The team ended their season by becoming the first non-Canadian team to make it to a men's Grand Slam final at the 2011 Players' Championship, losing in the final to Team Kevin Martin.

Edin's rink continued its success into the 2011–12 season. The season became their best year at the Grand Slams, reaching the playoffs in three slams, including the semifinals of the Masters and Canadian Open and the quarterfinals at the National. They also successfully defended their title at the Oslo Cup and repeated their Elite Series title win. In the international curling championships, they first won a silver medal at the 2011 European Curling Championships after losing in the final to Norway's Thomas Ulsrud. Later that season, the team won its second bronze medal at the 2012 World Men's Curling Championship. Edin played three games through severe pain with significant injuries, requiring the team to be reshuffled with Sebastian Kraupp skipping for the team, Fredrik Lindberg moving up to the third position, and Oskar Eriksson curling in the second position through the bronze medal game.

The 2012–13 season became Edin's best season up until that point in time. Nationally, they won a third straight Elite Series title. Internationally, they only reached one Grand Slam playoff - the quarterfinal at the National. They also, however, won their third straight Oslo Cup and the Victoria Curling Classic. Their biggest success came by peaking when it counted in the international championships, taking two important gold medals in the same season. The first came at the 2012 European Curling Championships, where they beat Team Ulsrud in the final. The team then won the 2013 World Curling Championship, giving Edin his first world championship gold medal. It was also the first time since 2004 that a Swedish men's curling team had won a world championship title.

The 2013–14 season was not as successful for the Edin rink, becoming their first without any title. They achieved their best success reaching the semifinals of the Shorty Jenkins Classic, beating Kevin Martin in the quarterfinals. Unfortunately, the team reached the playoffs of only one Grand Slam, finishing in the quarterfinals of the Masters, along with the quarterfinals of the Baden Masters and Cactus Pheasant Classic. The team also finished with a disappointing 5th place at the 2013 European Curling Championships. At the 2014 Winter Olympics, Sweden finished in first place after the round-robin, with an 8–1 record but lost a tight match to the Great Britain team skipped by David Murdoch in the semi-final. Following this defeat, the team defeated China's Liu Rui to win the bronze medal, giving Edin the first Olympic medal of his career.

The last months of the 2013–14 season signaled the eventual end of what was then known as Team Edin. Because the team had increased their international travel and the time spent in Canada to become more competitive, they had to skip the Swedish Curling Championships and withdrew from the Elite Series, despite leading the series before the finals. The Swedish Curling Federation then chose the team led by Oskar Eriksson to represent Sweden at the 2014 World Men's Curling Championship, with Eriksson skipping a team including future Team Edin members Christoffer Sundgren and Kristian Lindström. The choice of Team Eriksson reflected that they had success on the World Curling Tour and were competitive with Team Edin, but they also won the Swedish Men's Curling Championships and lost a close final in the Elite Series, coming in second place. The team lived up to expectations by winning the silver World Championship medal. This also meant, however, that Team Edin was unable to defend their 2013 championship win. Instead, the team finished the season reaching the semifinals of the Pomeroy Inn & Suites Prairie Showdown, followed by a disappointing sixth-place finish at the European Masters. At the end of the season, the team formally announced that they were disbanding, with Niklas Edin eager to continue, but with Sebastian Kraupp and Fredrik Lindberg concerned about their ability to train and compete as necessary to reach the top of the World Curling Tour rankings while focusing on their future careers.

=== Team Edin II (2014–2016) ===
In May 2014, Edin and Team Eriksson agreed to form a new Team Edin, with Edin skipping the team in the fourth position, Oskar Eriksson playing third, Kristian Lindström at second, and Christoffer Sundgren as lead. The new team immediately saw their increased potential and aimed to become the number one team in the world. The 2014–15 season indeed became a golden year for the new Team Edin, as the team first won the gold medal at the 2014 European Curling Championships. Edin skipped Team Sweden to a perfect 11–0 record to win the European Championship, defeating Norway's Team Ulsrud in the final game, giving Edin his third European Championship gold. Team Edin then capped off the season by winning the World Championship gold medal at the 2015 Ford World Men's Curling Championship. While the team lost three round-robin games, they rallied in the playoffs defeating Finland, Canada, and then their Norwegian rivals again to pick up the championship. The victory meant that Edin and Eriksson held the gold medals at the European and World Championships for the second time in a single curling season. That season, the team also reached their second career Grand Slam final, losing in the inaugural Elite 10 event.

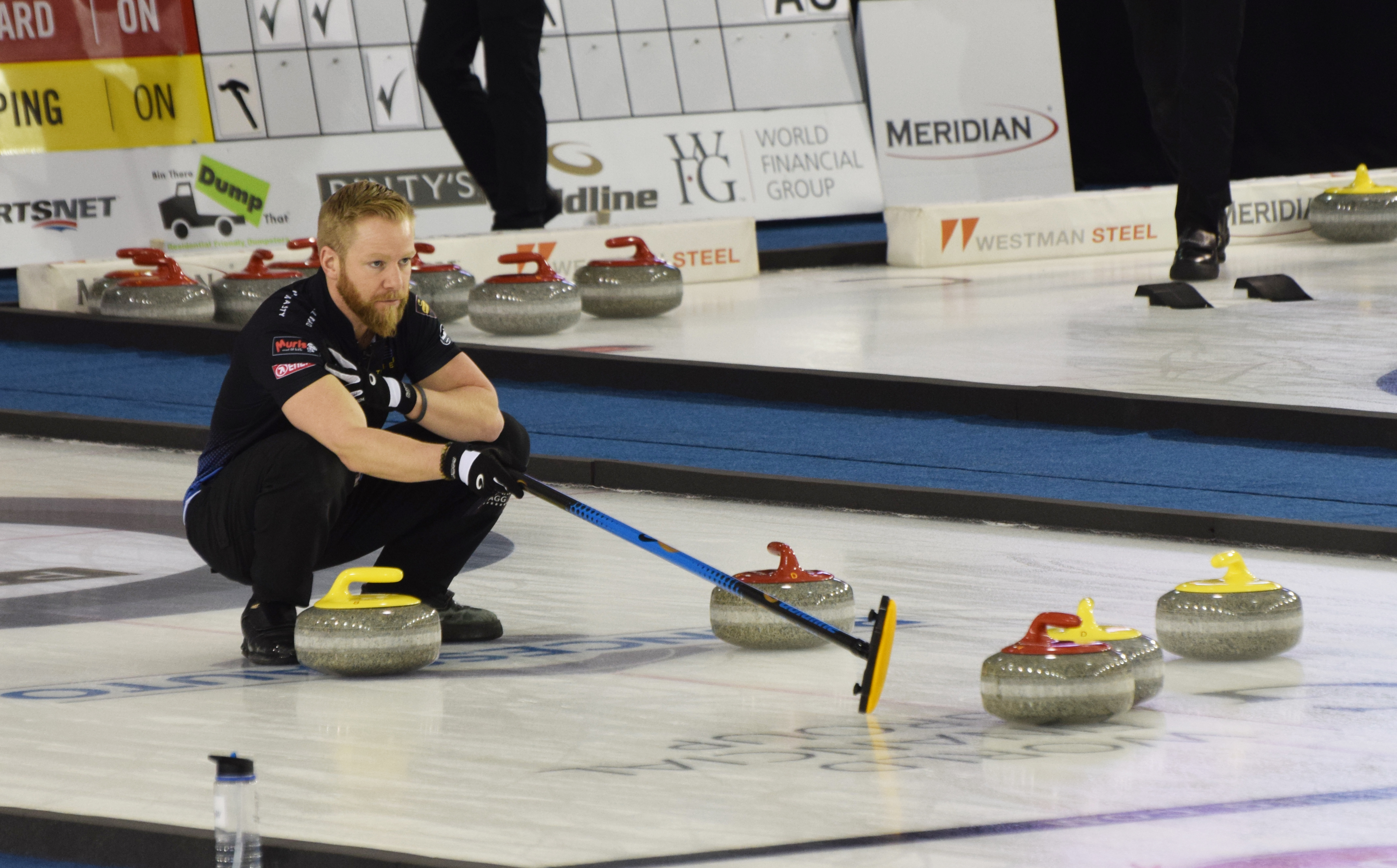
Niklas Edin holds the broom for a shot at the 2018 Elite 10 event in Winnipeg, Manitoba

During the 2015–16 curling season, Team Edin picked up their second straight European Curling Championship gold medal when they won the 2015 European Curling Championships, this time defeating Switzerland's Peter de Cruz in the final. The team found less success at that season's World Championships, placing sixth. The team became increasingly competitive, however, at the Grand Slams, reaching the playoffs in the Masters, the Canadian Open, Players' Championship, and the Champions Cup. The team also won the Baden Masters, reached the finals of the European Masters, and finished in third place at the Karuizawa International, as well as the German Masters. At the end of the season, Lindström was forced to take a break from curling, requiring a shoulder operation and needing recovery.

=== Team Edin III (2016–present) ===
==== 2016–2018: Grand Slam history and third World Championship ====
During 2016–17 curling season, Rasmus Wranå became Team Edin's new second and the final member to join the current Team Edin. The team had one of its greatest seasons, winning three Grand Slam events, starting with the 2016 WFG Masters, a win that also made curling history as Team Edin became the first non-Canadian skip to win a men's Grand Slam event. Later that same season, Team Edin became the first non-Canadian team to win the Tour Challenge and the Player's Championship. As a result, Team Edin also became the only non-Canadian team currently to have won more than one Slam. His team also finished the season in first place on the Tour in terms of order-of-merit points and money won, becoming the first time a non-Canadian team won the Pinty's Cup. Team Edin also won the 2016 European Curling Championships – the second for the new Team Edin and the fifth for Edin and his teammate Eriksson. Team Edin also made the finals of the 2017 World Men's Curling Championship, winning a silver medal after falling short in the final to Team Canada (skipped by Brad Gushue).

In the 2017–18 curling season, Team Edin had one of their most successful seasons, winning the gold medal at the European Curling Championships, the silver medal for the men's team at 2018 Winter Olympics (losing to the United States team skipped by John Shuster), and then avenged their loss at the 2017 Worlds by defeating Team Gushue in the finals of the 2018 World Men's Curling Championship, giving Edin his third World Championship gold medal. The team also won the Baden Masters, Curling Masters Champery, and Perth Masters, and reached the finals of three Grand Slam of Curling events - the Masters, the Canadian Open, and the Players' Championship.

==== 2018–2022:The road to World Championship history and Olympic gold ====
In the 2018–19 curling season, at the 2018 European Curling Championships, Team Edin went undefeated in the tournament until the final, where they lost to Scotland's rink skipped by Bruce Mouat. They again represented Sweden at the 2019 World Men's Curling Championship, winning the gold medal over Team Canada's Kevin Koe. It was Edin's fourth career World championship, tying Ernie Richardson's record of four World championships as a skip. Edin's win was significant, however, as he is the only skip to reach this milestone since the World Championships (formerly known as the Scotch Cup) expanded to three or more teams, with Richardson's first two Championships secured in contests between only two teams (Canada and Scotland). Edin also played in all four legs of the inaugural Curling World Cup, losing in the finals of the second and third legs.

Team Edin had a slow start to the 2019–20 season but also reached new milestones as the season progressed. After finishing as the runner-up at the Baden Masters, they did not qualify for the playoffs at the first Grand Slam, the 2019 Masters. They then reached the bronze medal position at the Swiss Cup Basel, and made the playoffs at the 2019 Tour Challenge before losing to Team Brad Gushue in the quarters. In November 2019, however, Team Edin won a record seventh European Curling Curling Championship at the 2019 European Curling Championships. In December, the team also reached their tenth final at a Grand Slam of Curling event when they reached the final of the Boost National, losing to Team Brad Jacobs. The team finished the year in Japan at the Karuizawa International, coming in second to Team Matsumura. As the new year began, Team Edin, rejoined Team Europe and successfully defended their Continental Cup of Curling title, though they did not reach the playoffs at the 2020 Canadian Open. In February 2020, Team Edin won the Swedish Men's Curling Championships and thus cemented their right to compete for their third straight World Men's Championship title. Unfortunately, the 2020 World Men's Curling Championship was cancelled due to the global Coronavirus pandemic.

Team Edin began the 2020–21 season by winning the 2020 Baden Masters, Edin's third title in the event, tying the record held by Thomas Ulsrud, Andreas Schwaller, and Brad Gushue. The team then reached the quarterfinals at the final World Curling Tour men's series 400 event in Europe in 2020, the Curling Masters Champéry. With team curling effectively shut down in Europe after October 2020, Team Edin did not return to competitive play until the 2021 World Men's Curling Championship. Despite the challenge of returning without a competitive national championship, the team finished at the top of the leaderboard and was ranked first in the playoffs, defeating Team Mouat of Scotland in the final and winning the fourth gold medal for Edin and Eriksson and the third straight World Championship gold for the team - the first team to achieve this feat and to do so with the same four players. Edin and his teammates were also selected to compete in the 2022 Winter Olympics at the end of the season.

The 2021–22 season began with Team Edin reaching the playoffs in the first five tournaments they entered. In Switzerland, the team reached the semifinals of the Baden Masters, then the finals of the Swiss Cup Basel. The team then began the Canadian leg of their autumn schedule by winning the Penticton Curling Classic. The team also reached the quarterfinals in the Euro Super Series, as well as at the Masters and the National in the Grand Slam of Curling. At the 2021 European Curling Championships, the team won a silver medal, extending Team Edin's legacy of winning gold or silver at every championship since 2011 but one (2013). The team began 2022 with historic gold medals – their first Olympic gold and their fourth straight gold at the World Men's Curling Championship – the first team in history to win both Olympic and World Championship medals back-to-back in a single season. The World Championship win also gave Edin and Eriksson their sixth World Championship team gold medals – the first curlers in the world to do so – and gave Sundgren his fifth World Championship gold, placing him currently second on the all-time World Championship team gold medal list. The team wrapped up the season by coming in second place in the finals of the 2022 Players' Championship and reaching the semifinals of the 2022 Champions Cup.

==== 2022–2026:The road to the 2026 Olympics ====
===== 2022–23 season =====
Shortly after the 2021–22 season closed, Team Edin formally announced that the same lineup planned to continue through the end of the next Olympic cycle, aiming to secure another medal in the 2026 Olympics in Cortina d'Ampezzo, Italy. The 2022–23 season thus became the seventh season for the team, establishing the lineup as the longest-running Team Edin to date. The season started with Team Edin failing to make the playoffs in the Baden Masters, but then rallied to win the Oslo Cup and the Stu Sells Toronto Tankard. They then began the season's Grand Slam of Curling tour at the National, reaching the final. At the Tour Challenge(Tier 1), the team went undefeated on their way to winning the event, even though Edin was injured during the semifinal draw shot challenge and was sidelined through the final. Eriksson, Sundgren, and Wranå competed under the Edin banner for the team's next two events, winning the Western Showdown and reaching the semifinals of the Penticton Curling Classic. For the 2022 European Curling Championships, Team Eriksson competed for Sweden, with Daniel Magnusson moving to the second position, Wranå to third, and Eriksson as skip for the first time at a European Curling Championship. The team lost in the semifinal by one point to Team Switzerland, the first time since 2013 that Team Sweden did not reach the medal podium. Edin was back in the lineup to play in the 2023 Canadian Open played in January that season. The team found success with Edin back in the lineup, making it as far as the finals in the Canadian Open, before losing to Brendan Bottcher's rink. The team won the 2023 Swedish Curling Championship without him, but were re-united to play in the 2023 World Men's Curling Championship. The team went on to finish the 2023 Worlds with a 9–3 round robin record. They were eliminated by Canada in the qualification playoff game, ending their reign as World Champions for four years running. It also marked the first season in which Team Edin did not medal in either the European Curling Championship or World Curling Championship.

The "spinner"

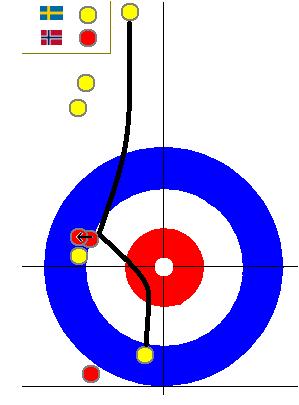
Edin was faced with an incredibly difficult shot in the 10th end to score two and force an extra end against Norway at the 2023 World Men's Championship. To make the shot, Edin had to throw the stone with an excessive amount of rotation to bump a frozen Norwegian rock leftward without displacing his Swedish rock too far, and then holding the shooter to count as the second point. After making the shot, there was a measurement to confirm Sweden had scored two.

In their Draw 12 game at the 2023 World Men's Curling Championship against Norway, Edin made what many were calling one of the greatest or "craziest" shots in curling history, which has been dubbed a "shot heard around the curling world". Down by two in the tenth end, Edin had to throw a rock with an incredible amount of spin, making it curl enough to bump a guarded corner-frozen Norwegian stone at the perfect angle to avoid moving the Swedish rock it was frozen to, while also moving the Norwegian stone far enough to score two. A near-impossible shot, it could have only been made by throwing a "spinner," a rarely thrown shot in the sport. Usually a rock will rotate just a few times during its trajectory, but Edin's rock made over 53.5 rotations according to curling oddsmaker Matt Hall. Throwing a spinner is so rare, laughter could be heard at the arena when Edin released the rock. Edin was successful though, with his shooter rock being the second point, which was confirmed after a measurement. TSN commentator Russ Howard called the shot "the best ... I've ever seen in my life!" World Curling Federation commentator Tyler George said "There's these moments in sports where sometimes the moment is bigger than the result of the game. I will remember that shot for as long as I live." Despite the shot, Team Sweden ended up losing the game in the extra end.

===== 2023–24 season =====
The 2023–24 season did not see the team win any tour events, but ended with Team Edin winning a record seventh World Curling Championship in April. On the road to the Championship, the team came in second place at the Shorty Jenkins Classic and the 2023 National, as well as at the European Curling Championships, where the team finished with a 6-3 win-loss record, reaching the final and coming in second to Scotland after losing in an extra end. The team fell short in the Sun City Cup in their home rink in Karlstad, but spent the rest of the season leading up to the worlds training and preparing for the World Curling Championships. The team won their first eleven games there, and were ranked in first place after the round robin. The team made it to the final, and won the gold medal in a tight victory over Canada (Team Gushue). The victory was an historic seventh World Curling Championship victory for Edin and Erkisson, and the sixth for Sundgren and fifth for Wranå. The team ended their season at the Players' Championship, where the team reached the quarterfinals.

=== Mixed events ===
Despite his participation in mixed events early in his curling career, Edin had until recently primarily played mixed doubles and mixed team curling at the Continental Cup. After the addition of Mixed Doubles in the 2018 Olympics, however, Edin began to participate in mixed doubles events, in part reflecting the Swedish Curling Association's recognition that Team Sweden might more likely earn a place in the Mixed Doubles Olympic competition by permitting curlers on men's and women's national teams to vie for a chance to compete in Mixed Doubles at the World Mixed Doubles Curling Championship. As a result, Edin began to participate in the Swedish Mixed Doubles Curling Championships, placing 4th in 2019, but missing the playoffs in 2020. He also teamed up with Rachel Homan for the inaugural mixed doubles event at the 2018 WCT Arctic Cup, and the duo won the event.

In the 2020–21 season, the Swedish Curling Association launched a substantial effort to support five teams on the mixed doubles tour in order to prepare for the 2021 World Mixed Doubles Curling Championship and to secure an entry for Team Sweden to compete in mixed doubles at the 2022 Olympics. Edin was selected for one of the teams, partnering with Emma Sjödin of Team Sundberg for the 2020–21 curling season. In their inaugural event, the Oberstdorf International Mixed Doubles Cup, Sjödin and Edin reached the semifinals, losing to Sjödin's teammate Johanna Heldin and Team Edin alternate Daniel Magnusson. Sjödin and Edin won their next mixed doubles event, the 2020 WCT Tallinn Mixed Doubles International, defeating the tournament frontrunners Jayne Stirling and Fraser Kingan in the final.

== Career Milestones and Records ==
Niklas Edin is the only skip in history to skip teams to eight World Men's Curling Championship gold medals and the first to do so at four consecutive World Men's Curling Championships (2013, 2015, 2018, 2019, 2021, 2022, 2024, and 2026). He is also the only skip in history to have skipped a team to three Olympic medals ... a gold (2022), a silver (2018), and a bronze (2014) – and the only skip to secure back-to-back Olympic and World Men's Curling Championship in history. Currently, only two other curlers have won all three medals, Agnes Knochenhauer and Oskar Eriksson.

Edin also currently holds several records with his teammates Eriksson, Sundgren, and Wranå, who formed the team that won four gold medals between 2018 and 2022. Edin and Eriksson share the records for both most World Men's Curling Championship titles (eight) and European Men's Curling Championship titles (eight). They also hold the record as the first men's curlers to simultaneously hold both the World Curling Championship and European Curling Championships in four separate curling seasons (2012–2013, 2014–2015, 2017–2018 and 2025–2026). In 2019, Edin, together with his teammates Eriksson and Sundgren, also became the first men's curlers to hold these same titles simultaneously in two separate calendar years (2015 and 2019). Edin, Eriksson, and Sundgren are also the first curlers in history on the men's side to win four European Championship gold medals in a row (2014–2017). Edin is also the only curler to appear in the Continental Cup for twelve consecutive competitions (2007–08 and 2011–2020, with the competition not held in 2009 or 2010). With Eriksson, Sundgren, and Wranå, Edin's team became the first non-Canadian men's team to win three Slams at the Grand Slam of Curling and the Pinty's Cup, with the only other non-Canadian men's team to win more slams skipped by Bruce Mouat.

In 2009 Edin was inducted into the Swedish Curling Hall of Fame.

== Grand Slam record ==
When Edin won the 2016 WFG Masters, he became the first non-Canadian skip to win a men's Grand Slam event.

Key
C	Champion
F	Lost in Final
SF	Lost in Semifinal
QF	Lost in Quarterfinals
R16	Lost in the round of 16
Q	Did not advance to playoffs
T2	Played in Tier 2 event
DNP	Did not participate in event
N/A	Not a Grand Slam event that season

Event	2006–07	2007–08	2008–09	2009–10	2010–11	2011–12	2012–13	2013–14	2014–15	2015–16	2016–17	2017–18	2018–19	2019–20	2020–21	2021–22	2022–23	2023–24	2024–25	2025–26
Masters	DNP	DNP	DNP	QF	QF	SF	Q	QF	Q	QF	C	F	SF	Q	N/A	QF	DNP	Q	QF	Q
Tour Challenge	N/A	N/A	N/A	N/A	N/A	N/A	N/A	N/A	N/A	Q	C	SF	Q	QF	N/A	N/A	C	QF	Q	QF
The National	DNP	DNP	DNP	DNP	QF	QF	QF	Q	DNP	Q	SF	DNP	QF	F	N/A	QF	F	F	Q	Q
Canadian Open	Q	DNP	DNP	DNP	DNP	SF	DNP	Q	Q	QF	F	F	SF	Q	N/A	N/A	F	Q	QF	Q
Players'	DNP	DNP	DNP	QF	F	DNP	Q	Q	Q	QF	C	F	QF	N/A	QF	F	QF	QF	DNP	Q
Champions Cup	N/A	N/A	N/A	N/A	N/A	N/A	N/A	N/A	N/A	QF	SF	Q	SF	N/A	QF	SF	SF	N/A	N/A	N/A
Elite 10	N/A	N/A	N/A	N/A	N/A	N/A	N/A	N/A	F	Q	Q	Q	Q	N/A	N/A	N/A	N/A	N/A	N/A	N/A

== Teams ==
Season	Skip	Third	Second	Lead	Alternate	Events
2003–04	Niklas Edin	Nils Carlsén	Jörgen Granberg	Fredrik Lindberg	Anders Eriksson	WJCC
2005–06	Nils Carlsén	Niklas Edin	Marcus Hasselborg	Manne Allberg		WJCC, WCC
2006–07	Niklas Edin; Nils Carlsén	Marcus Hasselborg; Niklas Edin	Manne Allberg; Marcus Hasselborg	Fredrik Lindberg; Manne Allberg	Kristian Lindström	WJCC; WCT
2007–08	Nils Carlsén	Niklas Edin	Marcus Hasselborg	Manne Allberg		
2008–09	Niklas Edin	Sebastian Kraupp	Fredrik Lindberg	Viktor Kjäll		
2009–10	Niklas Edin	Sebastian Kraupp	Fredrik Lindberg	Viktor Kjäll	Oskar Eriksson	ECC, OG
2010–11	Niklas Edin	Sebastian Kraupp	Fredrik Lindberg	Viktor Kjäll	Oskar Eriksson	ECC, WCC
2011–12	Niklas Edin	Sebastian Kraupp	Fredrik Lindberg	Viktor Kjäll	Oskar Eriksson	ECC, WCC
2012–13	Niklas Edin	Sebastian Kraupp	Fredrik Lindberg	Viktor Kjäll	Oskar Eriksson	ECC, WCC
2013–14	Niklas Edin	Sebastian Kraupp	Fredrik Lindberg	Viktor Kjäll	Oskar Eriksson	ECC, OG
2014–15	Niklas Edin	Oskar Eriksson	Kristian Lindström	Christoffer Sundgren	Henrik Leek	ECC, WCC
2015–16	Niklas Edin	Oskar Eriksson	Kristian Lindström	Christoffer Sundgren	Henrik Leek	ECC, WCC
2016–17	Niklas Edin	Oskar Eriksson	Rasmus Wranå	Christoffer Sundgren	Henrik Leek	ECC, WCC
2017–18	Niklas Edin	Oskar Eriksson	Rasmus Wranå	Christoffer Sundgren	Henrik Leek	ECC, OG, WCC
2018–19	Niklas Edin	Oskar Eriksson	Rasmus Wranå	Christoffer Sundgren	Daniel Magnusson	ECC, WCC
2019–20	Niklas Edin	Oskar Eriksson	Rasmus Wranå	Christoffer Sundgren	Daniel Magnusson	ECC
2020–21	Niklas Edin	Oskar Eriksson	Rasmus Wranå	Christoffer Sundgren	Daniel Magnusson	WCC
2021–22	Niklas Edin	Oskar Eriksson	Rasmus Wranå	Christoffer Sundgren	Daniel Magnusson	ECC, OG, WCC
2022–23	Niklas Edin	Oskar Eriksson	Rasmus Wranå	Christoffer Sundgren	Daniel Magnusson	ECC, WCC
2023–24	Niklas Edin	Oskar Eriksson	Rasmus Wranå	Christoffer Sundgren	Daniel Magnusson	ECC, WCC
2024–25	Niklas Edin	Oskar Eriksson	Rasmus Wranå	Christoffer Sundgren	Daniel Magnusson (ECC); Simon Olofsson (WCC)	ECC, WCC
2025–26	Niklas Edin	Oskar Eriksson	Rasmus Wranå	Christoffer Sundgren	Simon Olofsson	ECC, OG, WCC

Olympic Games
Preceded by Therese Alshammar	Flagbearer for Sweden; Pyeongchang 2018	Succeeded by
