= 2003 World Junior Curling Championships =

- Host city: Flims, Switzerland
- Arena: Die Alpenarena
- Dates: March 22–30, 2003
- Men's winner: Canada
- Skip: Steve Laycock
- Third: Christopher Haichert
- Second: Michael Jantzen
- Lead: Kyler Broad
- Alternate: Ben Hebert
- Coach: Barry Fiendell
- Finalist: Sweden (Eric Carlsén)
- Women's winner: Canada
- Skip: Marliese Miller
- Third: Tejay Surik
- Second: Janelle Lemon
- Lead: Chelsey Bell
- Alternate: Tammy Schneider
- Coach: Bob Miller
- Finalist: United States (Cassandra Johnson)

The 2003 World Junior Curling Championships were held at the Die Alpenarena in Flims, Switzerland March 22–30. Teams from the province of Saskatchewan won gold medals in both events for Canada. It would be the last women's championship won by Canada until 2014.

== Men's ==
Country	Skip	Wins	Losses
Canada	Steve Laycock	7	2
Sweden	Eric Carlsén	7	2
Switzerland	Jan Hauser	7	2
Norway	Thomas Løvold	7	2
Japan	Hiroaki Kashiwagi	4	5
Scotland	Keith MacLennan	4	5
Germany	Christian Baumann	3	6
Denmark	Casper Bossen	3	6
Finland	Tuomas Vuori	2	7
Russia	Vadim Stebakov	1	8

=== Playoffs ===
Semi-final
1	Canada	5
4	Norway	4
2	Sweden	10
3	Switzerland	6

Final
1	Canada	5
2	Sweden	4
Bronze medal
3	Switzerland	7
4	Norway	4

2003 World Junior Curling Championships
(Canada)
Canada
13th Men's World Junior Championship title

== Women's ==
Country	Skip	Wins	Losses
Canada	Marliese Miller	9	0
United States	Cassandra Johnson	6	3
Italy	Diana Gaspari	6	3
Sweden	Stina Viktorsson	5	4
Japan	Ai Kobayashi	5	4
Switzerland	Valeria Spälty	4	5
Scotland	Rachael Simms	4	5
Norway	Linn Githmark	3	6
Russia	Liudmila Privivkova	2	7
Germany	Juliane Jacoby	1	8

=== Tie breaker ===
Sheet B	1	2	3	4	5	6	7	8	9	10	Final
Japan (Kobayashi) 🔨	0	1	0	0	0	2	0	1	0	0	4
Sweden (Viktorsson)	0	0	1	0	2	0	0	0	2	1	6

=== Playoffs ===
Semi-final
1	Canada	10
4	Sweden	6
2	United States	8
3	Italy	5

Final
1	Canada	5
2	United States	4
Bronze medal
3	Italy	7
4	Sweden	6

==== Semi-finals ====
Sheet A	1	2	3	4	5	6	7	8	9	10	Final
Sweden (Viktorsson)	0	1	0	1	0	0	2	0	2	0	6
Canada (Miller) 🔨	1	0	2	0	1	2	0	3	0	1	10

Sheet D	1	2	3	4	5	6	7	8	9	10	Final
United States (Johnson)	0	1	0	0	3	1	3	0	0	0	8
Italy (Gaspari) 🔨	1	0	0	2	0	0	0	1	0	1	5

==== Bronze Game ====
Sheet C	1	2	3	4	5	6	7	8	9	10	Final
Italy (Gaspari) 🔨	2	0	0	0	1	0	0	0	2	2	7
Sweden (Viktorsson)	0	0	1	0	0	1	0	2	0	0	4

==== Final ====
Sheet B	1	2	3	4	5	6	7	8	9	10	Final
United States (Johnson)	0	0	1	0	0	0	2	0	1	0	4
Canada (Miller) 🔨	1	0	0	0	1	0	0	2	0	1	5

2003 World Junior Curling Championships
(Canada)
Canada
8th Women's World Junior Championship title

== Sources ==
- Men's results from the World Curling Federation
- Women's results from the World Curling Federation
