= Marcus Hasselborg =

Swedish actor and curler

Marcus Sven Erland Hasselborg (born 7 January 1986 in Stockholm) is a Swedish actor and curler. He played second for Sweden at the 2006 World Men's Curling Championships, and he finished in 2nd place when he participated at the 2008 Men's Svenska Mästerskapet curling final in Örnsköldsvik. He works as a high school teacher at Procivitas Privata Gymnasium Karlberg.

== Filmography ==
- 2004 - Hip! Hip! Hora!
- 2000 - Den bästa sommaren
- 1999 - Tsatsiki, morsan och polisen
