= 2010 World Men's Curling Championship =

Coordinates: 46°32′N 12°08′E

- Host city: Cortina d'Ampezzo, Italy
- Arena: Stadio Olimpico Del Ghiaccio
- Dates: April 3–11, 2010
- Winner: Canada
- Curling club: Saville SC, Edmonton
- Skip: Kevin Koe
- Third: Blake MacDonald
- Second: Carter Rycroft
- Lead: Nolan Thiessen
- Alternate: Jamie King
- Coach: John Dunn
- Finalist: Norway (Torger Nergård)

The 2010 World Men's Curling Championship (branded as the Capital One World Men's Curling Championship 2010 for sponsorship reasons) was held from April 3–11, 2010 at the Stadio Olimpico Del Ghiaccio in Cortina d'Ampezzo, Italy.

== Qualification ==
- Italy (Host country)
- Scotland (Defending champions)
- Canada (Top Americas finisher from the 2009 World Championship)
- China (Pacific champion)
- Japan (Pacific runner-up)
- Six teams from the 2009 European Championship:
  - Sweden
  - Switzerland
  - Norway
  - France
  - Germany
  - Denmark
- American berth from the 2010 USA-Brazil Challenge
  - United States

== Teams ==
Canada	China	Denmark
Saville Sports Centre, Edmonton Skip: Kevin Koe; Third: Blake MacDonald; Second: Carter Rycroft; Lead: Nolan Thiessen; Alternate: Jamie King	Harbin CC, Harbin Fourth: Liu Rui; Third: Xu Xiaoming; Skip: Wang Fengchun; Lead: Zang Jialiang; Alternate: Ba Dexin	Hvidovre CC, Hvidovre Fourth: Johnny Frederiksen; Skip: Ulrik Schmidt; Second: Bo Jensen; Lead: Lars Vilandt; Alternate: Mikkel Poulsen
France	Germany	Italy
Chamonix CC, Chamonix Skip: Thomas Dufour; Third: Tony Angiboust; Second: Jan Ducroz; Lead: Richard Ducroz; Alternate: Raphael Mathieu	CC Füssen, Füssen Skip: Andy Kapp; Third: Andreas Lang; Second: Holger Höhne; Lead: Andreas Kempf; Alternate: Daniel Herberg	Trentino CC, Cembra Skip: Joel Retornaz; Third: Silvio Zanotelli; Second: Davide Zanotelli; Lead: Julien Genre; Alternate: Giorgio Da Rin
Japan	Norway	Scotland
Kitami Curling Association Skip: Makoto Tsuruga; Third: Yuki Sawamukai; Second: Yusaku Shibaya; Lead: Ryosuke Haneishi; Alternate: Ryuya Ishigaki	Snarøen CK, Bærum Skip: Torger Nergård*; Third: Thomas Løvold; Second: Christoffer Svae; Lead: Håvard Vad Petersson; Alternate: None	Airleywight CC & St. Matkins CC, Perth; Gogar Park CC, Edinburgh Fourth: Warwick Smith; Skip: David Smith; Second: Craig Wilson; Lead: Ross Hepburn; Alternate: David Murdoch
Sweden	Switzerland	United States
Sundsvalls CK, Sundsvall Skip: Per Carlsén; Third: Nils Carlsén; Second: Eric Carlsén; Lead: Niklas Berggren; Alternate: Mikael Norberg	St. Moritz CC, St. Moritz Skip: Stefan Karnusian; Third: Christof Schwaller; Second: Robert Hürlimann; Lead: Rolf Iseli; Alternate: Dominic Andres	Bemidji CC, Bemidji Skip: Pete Fenson; Third: Shawn Rojeski; Second: Joe Polo; Lead: Tyler George; Alternate: Mark Haluptzok

* Thomas Ulsrud withdrew before the start of competition due to an illness in the family.

== Round-robin standings ==
Final round-robin standings

Country	Skip	W	L	PF	PA	Ends Won	Ends Lost	Blank Ends	Stolen Ends	Shot Pct.
Norway	Torger Nergård	10	1	78	43	52	32	14	18	85%
Canada	Kevin Koe	9	2	86	47	47	35	6	15	86%
United States	Pete Fenson	8	3	73	52	43	40	16	9	80%
Scotland	David Smith	8	3	74	57	40	38	22	7	80%
Denmark	Ulrik Schmidt	7	4	71	62	44	46	12	6	79%
Switzerland	Stefan Karnusian	5	6	55	72	36	47	18	5	78%
Germany	Andy Kapp	5	6	62	67	42	42	17	7	73%
Sweden	Per Carlsén	4	7	54	72	37	38	17	8	76%
France	Thomas Dufour	3	8	58	69	38	40	20	11	74%
Italy	Joel Retornaz	3	8	63	81	48	48	13	12	74%
China	Wang Fengchun	3	8	52	71	38	43	22	9	77%
Japan	Makoto Tsuruga	1	10	53	86	38	52	11	3	70%

== Round-robin results ==
All draw times listed are in Central European Time

=== Draw 1 ===
Saturday, April 3, 14:00

Sheet A	1	2	3	4	5	6	7	8	9	10	Final
Sweden (Carlsén)	0	0	0	0	0	0	0	1	0	X	1
France (Dufour)	0	1	1	0	2	0	1	0	0	X	5

Sheet B	1	2	3	4	5	6	7	8	9	10	Final
China (Wang)	0	0	0	0	0	1	1	0	2	0	4
Germany (Kapp)	0	0	1	1	1	0	0	1	0	1	5

Sheet C	1	2	3	4	5	6	7	8	9	10	11	Final
Japan (Tsuruga)	0	1	0	1	1	0	2	0	0	1	0	6
Italy (Retornaz)	1	0	1	0	0	1	0	2	1	0	1	7

Sheet D	1	2	3	4	5	6	7	8	9	10	Final
Norway (Nergård)	0	0	0	0	2	0	0	1	1	0	4
Scotland (Smith)	0	0	0	2	0	0	1	0	0	2	5

=== Draw 2 ===
Saturday, April 3, 19:00

Sheet A	1	2	3	4	5	6	7	8	9	10	11	Final
Italy (Retornaz)	0	2	0	2	0	1	0	0	0	1	0	6
China (Wang)	1	0	2	0	0	0	2	0	1	0	1	7

Sheet B	1	2	3	4	5	6	7	8	9	10	Final
Canada (Koe)	0	1	0	0	2	0	0	2	1	X	6
United States (Fenson)	1	0	0	1	0	0	1	0	0	X	3

Sheet C	1	2	3	4	5	6	7	8	9	10	Final
Switzerland (Karnusian)	0	0	1	0	1	0	1	0	X	X	3
Denmark (Schmidt)	2	3	0	1	0	1	0	2	X	X	9

Sheet D	1	2	3	4	5	6	7	8	9	10	Final
Japan (Tsuruga)	0	1	0	1	0	0	1	0	X	X	3
Germany (Kapp)	2	0	1	0	1	0	0	5	X	X	9

=== Draw 3 ===
Sunday, April 4th, 9:00

Sheet B	1	2	3	4	5	6	7	8	9	10	Final
Scotland (Smith)	0	2	0	0	0	5	0	1	0	X	8
Sweden (Carlsén)	0	0	0	1	1	0	1	0	1	X	4

Sheet C	1	2	3	4	5	6	7	8	9	10	Final
Norway (Nergård)	2	0	1	0	3	0	1	2	X	X	9
France (Dufour)	0	0	0	2	0	1	0	0	X	X	3

=== Draw 4 ===
Sunday, April 4th, 14:00

Sheet A	1	2	3	4	5	6	7	8	9	10	Final
United States (Fenson)	2	0	1	0	0	0	3	0	1	X	7
Switzerland (Karnusian)	0	1	0	2	1	0	0	1	0	X	5

Sheet B	1	2	3	4	5	6	7	8	9	10	Final
Germany (Kapp)	0	0	1	0	0	2	0	0	2	0	5
Italy (Retornaz)	0	0	0	2	1	0	1	1	0	1	6

Sheet C	1	2	3	4	5	6	7	8	9	10	Final
China (Wang)	0	0	2	0	2	0	2	0	1	1	8
Japan (Tsuruga)	0	1	0	2	0	2	0	1	0	0	6

Sheet D	1	2	3	4	5	6	7	8	9	10	Final
Canada (Koe)	1	0	4	0	3	0	X	X	X	X	8
Denmark (Schmidt)	0	1	0	1	0	1	X	X	X	X	3

=== Draw 5 ===
Sunday, April 4th, 19:00

Sheet A	1	2	3	4	5	6	7	8	9	10	Final
France (Dufour)	0	0	0	0	2	1	0	1	2	0	6
Scotland (Smith)	0	0	2	0	0	0	5	0	0	1	8

Sheet B	1	2	3	4	5	6	7	8	9	10	Final
Switzerland (Karnusian)	0	1	0	1	0	0	3	0	0	X	5
Canada (Koe)	0	0	1	0	2	1	0	3	2	X	9

Sheet C	1	2	3	4	5	6	7	8	9	10	Final
Denmark (Schmidt)	0	5	0	0	1	0	2	0	0	1	9
United States (Fenson)	0	0	2	1	0	2	0	1	1	0	7

Sheet D	1	2	3	4	5	6	7	8	9	10	Final
Sweden (Carlsén)	0	1	0	0	2	0	1	0	0	X	4
Norway (Nergård)	1	0	3	0	0	0	0	1	2	X	7

=== Draw 6 ===
Monday, April 5th, 8:00

Sheet A	1	2	3	4	5	6	7	8	9	10	Final
Norway (Nergård)	2	1	0	1	0	1	1	0	1	X	7
Japan (Tsuruga)	0	0	1	0	2	0	0	1	0	X	4

Sheet B	1	2	3	4	5	6	7	8	9	10	Final
Scotland (Smith)	0	2	0	3	0	0	1	2	X	X	8
China (Wang)	0	0	1	0	2	0	0	0	X	X	3

Sheet C	1	2	3	4	5	6	7	8	9	10	11	Final
Sweden (Carlsén)	0	0	0	2	0	1	0	1	0	2	1	7
Italy (Retornaz)	0	1	1	0	2	0	0	0	2	0	0	6

Sheet D	1	2	3	4	5	6	7	8	9	10	Final
France (Dufour)	0	2	0	0	2	0	1	0	1	X	6
Germany (Kapp)	1	0	4	1	0	1	0	2	0	X	9

=== Draw 7 ===
Monday, April 5th, 13:00

Sheet A	1	2	3	4	5	6	7	8	9	10	Final
China (Wang)	1	0	1	0	0	1	0	0	1	0	4
Denmark (Schmidt)	0	1	0	4	0	0	0	1	0	2	8

Sheet B	1	2	3	4	5	6	7	8	9	10	Final
Japan (Tsuruga)	0	0	0	0	0	1	0	0	X	X	1
United States (Fenson)	0	2	1	1	0	0	1	1	X	X	6

Sheet C	1	2	3	4	5	6	7	8	9	10	Final
Germany (Kapp)	1	0	0	0	0	2	0	0	0	0	3
Switzerland (Karnusian)	0	1	0	0	1	0	0	0	0	2	4

Sheet D	1	2	3	4	5	6	7	8	9	10	Final
Italy (Retornaz)	0	0	2	0	0	1	0	1	1	0	5
Canada (Koe)	1	0	0	1	2	0	2	0	0	1	7

=== Draw 8 ===
Monday, April 5th, 18:00

Sheet A	1	2	3	4	5	6	7	8	9	10	Final
Canada (Koe)	0	2	1	0	4	0	1	0	X	X	8
Sweden (Carlsén)	1	0	0	1	0	1	0	1	X	X	4

Sheet B	1	2	3	4	5	6	7	8	9	10	Final
Switzerland (Karnusian)	0	1	0	0	2	0	0	2	0	X	5
France (Dufour)	0	0	0	1	0	0	2	0	1	X	4

Sheet C	1	2	3	4	5	6	7	8	9	10	Final
United States (Fenson)	0	0	0	1	0	1	2	0	0	X	4
Norway (Nergård)	1	1	1	0	1	0	0	1	1	X	6

Sheet D	1	2	3	4	5	6	7	8	9	10	Final
Denmark (Schmidt)	0	0	1	0	0	0	0	2	1	X	4
Scotland (Smith)	2	1	0	3	0	0	1	0	0	X	7

=== Draw 9 ===
Tuesday, April 6th, 10:00

Sheet A	1	2	3	4	5	6	7	8	9	10	11	Final
United States (Fenson)	2	0	2	0	0	0	1	0	0	0	2	7
France (Dufour)	0	2	0	1	1	0	0	0	0	1	0	5

Sheet B	1	2	3	4	5	6	7	8	9	10	Final
Denmark (Schmidt)	0	2	0	2	0	3	0	3	X	X	10
Sweden (Carlsén)	1	0	1	0	1	0	1	0	X	X	4

Sheet C	1	2	3	4	5	6	7	8	9	10	Final
Canada (Koe)	1	0	3	1	1	0	X	X	X	X	6
Scotland (Smith)	0	1	0	0	0	1	X	X	X	X	2

Sheet D	1	2	3	4	5	6	7	8	9	10	Final
Switzerland (Karnusian)	0	1	0	0	0	0	X	X	X	X	1
Norway (Nergård)	2	0	2	1	1	1	X	X	X	X	7

=== Draw 10 ===
Tuesday, April 6th, 15:00

Sheet A	1	2	3	4	5	6	7	8	9	10	Final
Scotland (Smith)	0	1	0	0	3	0	0	1	2	X	7
Germany (Kapp)	1	0	1	0	0	0	2	0	0	X	4

Sheet B	1	2	3	4	5	6	7	8	9	10	Final
Norway (Nergård)	1	0	1	2	0	0	4	0	2	X	10
Italy (Retornaz)	0	1	0	0	0	2	0	2	0	X	5

Sheet C	1	2	3	4	5	6	7	8	9	10	Final
France (Dufour)	0	2	0	0	5	0	0	2	X	X	9
China (Wang)	2	0	0	0	0	0	2	0	X	X	4

Sheet D	1	2	3	4	5	6	7	8	9	10	Final
Sweden (Carlsén)	4	0	0	0	1	0	4	0	X	X	9
Japan (Tsuruga)	0	2	1	0	0	1	0	1	X	X	5

=== Draw 11 ===
Tuesday, April 6th, 20:00

Sheet A	1	2	3	4	5	6	7	8	9	10	Final
Italy (Retornaz)	1	0	0	1	1	1	0	0	1	0	5
Switzerland (Karnusian)	0	1	0	0	0	0	3	2	0	1	7

Sheet B	1	2	3	4	5	6	7	8	9	10	Final
Germany (Kapp)	0	3	0	1	0	1	1	0	2	1	9
Canada (Koe)	2	0	1	0	2	0	0	1	0	0	6

Sheet C	1	2	3	4	5	6	7	8	9	10	11	Final
Japan (Tsuruga)	2	0	0	1	1	0	1	0	0	1	0	6
Denmark (Schmidt)	0	0	1	0	0	2	0	2	1	0	1	7

Sheet D	1	2	3	4	5	6	7	8	9	10	Final
China (Wang)	0	0	1	0	0	2	0	1	1	0	5
United States (Fenson)	2	0	0	2	0	0	1	0	0	1	6

=== Draw 12 ===
Wednesday, April 7th, 10:00

Sheet A	1	2	3	4	5	6	7	8	9	10	Final
Japan (Tsuruga)	0	0	1	0	2	0	X	X	X	X	3
Canada (Koe)	4	3	0	3	0	2	X	X	X	X	12

Sheet B	1	2	3	4	5	6	7	8	9	10	Final
China (Wang)	0	0	2	0	0	1	2	1	1	X	7
Switzerland (Karnusian)	0	1	0	1	0	0	0	0	0	X	2

Sheet C	1	2	3	4	5	6	7	8	9	10	Final
Italy (Retornaz)	0	1	0	1	0	0	2	0	1	X	5
United States (Fenson)	0	0	2	0	0	2	0	4	0	X	8

Sheet D	1	2	3	4	5	6	7	8	9	10	11	Final
Germany (Kapp)	0	3	0	1	1	0	0	0	2	0	2	9
Denmark (Schmidt)	1	0	2	0	0	2	0	1	0	1	0	7

=== Draw 13 ===
Wednesday, April 7th, 15:00

Sheet A	1	2	3	4	5	6	7	8	9	10	Final
Denmark (Schmidt)	0	0	0	1	0	1	0	0	1	0	3
Norway (Nergård)	1	0	1	0	1	0	0	1	0	1	5

Sheet B	1	2	3	4	5	6	7	8	9	10	Final
United States (Fenson)	0	1	0	0	1	0	0	2	0	3	7
Scotland (Smith)	1	0	1	0	0	2	0	0	1	0	5

Sheet C	1	2	3	4	5	6	7	8	9	10	11	Final
Switzerland (Karnusian)	0	1	0	0	0	3	0	1	0	0	2	7
Sweden (Carlsén)	0	0	0	2	1	0	1	0	0	1	0	5

Sheet D	1	2	3	4	5	6	7	8	9	10	Final
Canada (Koe)	3	1	0	2	0	1	X	X	X	X	7
France (Dufour)	0	0	1	0	0	0	X	X	X	X	1

=== Draw 14 ===
Wednesday, April 7th, 20:00

Sheet A	1	2	3	4	5	6	7	8	9	10	Final
Sweden (Carlsén)	0	1	0	1	0	3	0	1	0	0	6
China (Wang)	2	0	0	0	1	0	0	0	0	1	4

Sheet B	1	2	3	4	5	6	7	8	9	10	Final
France (Dufour)	2	0	1	0	2	0	0	1	1	X	7
Japan (Tsuruga)	0	1	0	1	0	0	2	0	0	X	4

Sheet C	1	2	3	4	5	6	7	8	9	10	Final
Norway (Nergård)	1	0	0	4	0	1	0	0	2	X	8
Germany (Kapp)	0	1	0	0	1	0	0	1	0	X	3

Sheet D	1	2	3	4	5	6	7	8	9	10	Final
Scotland (Smith)	0	0	1	0	3	2	0	4	X	X	10
Italy (Retornaz)	0	2	0	1	0	0	1	0	X	X	4

=== Draw 15 ===
Thursday, April 8th, 10:00

Sheet A	1	2	3	4	5	6	7	8	9	10	Final
Germany (Kapp)	1	0	0	1	0	1	0	1	0	X	4
United States (Fenson)	0	2	0	0	2	0	2	0	2	X	8

Sheet B	1	2	3	4	5	6	7	8	9	10	Final
Italy (Retornaz)	0	1	0	1	1	0	2	0	0	0	5
Denmark (Schmidt)	2	0	1	0	0	1	0	1	0	1	6

Sheet C	1	2	3	4	5	6	7	8	9	10	Final
China (Wang)	0	0	0	1	0	0	2	0	X	X	3
Canada (Koe)	2	1	0	0	3	1	0	2	X	X	9

Sheet D	1	2	3	4	5	6	7	8	9	10	Final
Japan (Tsuruga)	2	0	0	2	0	1	0	3	0	1	9
Switzerland (Karnusian)	0	2	0	0	2	0	1	0	2	0	7

=== Draw 16 ===
Thursday, April 8th, 15:00

Sheet A	1	2	3	4	5	6	7	8	9	10	Final
France (Dufour)	0	3	0	0	2	1	0	2	0	0	8
Italy (Retornaz)	4	0	1	1	0	0	1	0	1	1	9

Sheet B	1	2	3	4	5	6	7	8	9	10	Final
Sweden (Carlsén)	1	3	0	4	0	0	X	X	X	X	8
Germany (Kapp)	0	0	1	0	0	1	X	X	X	X	2

Sheet C	1	2	3	4	5	6	7	8	9	10	11	Final
Scotland (Smith)	0	0	1	0	2	0	0	1	2	0	1	7
Japan (Tsuruga)	0	0	0	2	0	2	0	0	0	2	0	6

Sheet D	1	2	3	4	5	6	7	8	9	10	Final
Norway (Nergård)	1	1	0	2	0	0	0	2	0	X	6
China (Wang)	0	0	1	0	0	1	0	0	1	X	3

=== Draw 17 ===
Thursday, April 8th, 20:00

Sheet A	1	2	3	4	5	6	7	8	9	10	Final
Switzerland (Karnusian)	0	2	0	2	0	2	0	0	2	1	9
Scotland (Smith)	2	0	2	0	1	0	0	2	0	0	7

Sheet B	1	2	3	4	5	6	7	8	9	10	Final
Canada (Koe)	1	0	2	0	2	0	2	0	1	0	8
Norway (Nergård)	0	3	0	2	0	2	0	1	0	1	9

Sheet C	1	2	3	4	5	6	7	8	9	10	Final
Denmark (Schmidt)	0	3	0	1	0	1	1	0	0	0	6
France (Dufour)	1	0	1	0	1	0	0	1	0	0	4

Sheet D	1	2	3	4	5	6	7	8	9	10	Final
United States (Fenson)	2	1	0	2	0	5	X	X	X	X	10
Sweden (Carlsén)	0	0	1	0	1	0	X	X	X	X	2

== Playoffs ==
Page playoff system
1	Norway	5
2	Canada	11
3	Scotland	6
4	United States	4

Semifinal
1	Norway	9
3	Scotland	7

Gold medal game
2	Canada	9
1	Norway	3

Bronze medal game
4	United States	4
3	Scotland	6

=== 1 vs. 2 ===
Friday, April 9, 19:00

Sheet B	1	2	3	4	5	6	7	8	9	10	Final
Norway (Nergård)	1	0	0	1	0	2	0	1	X	X	5
Canada (Koe)	0	3	2	0	5	0	1	0	X	X	11

Player percentages
Norway		Canada	
Håvard Vad Petersson	92%	Nolan Thiessen	93%
Christoffer Svae	77%	Carter Rycroft	89%
Thomas Løvold	80%	Blake MacDonald	89%
Torger Nergård	75%	Kevin Koe	84%
Total	81%	Total	89%

=== 3 vs. 4 ===
Saturday, April 10, 10:00

Sheet B	1	2	3	4	5	6	7	8	9	10	11	Final
Scotland (Smith)	0	0	0	1	1	0	0	1	0	1	2	6
United States (Fenson)	0	1	0	0	0	1	0	0	2	0	0	4

Player percentages
Scotland		United States	
Ross Hepburn	90%	Tyler George	75%
Craig Wilson	76%	Joe Polo	74%
David Smith	78%	Shawn Rojeski	72%
Warwick Smith	84%	Pete Fenson	78%
Total	82%	Total	75%

=== Semifinal ===
Saturday, April 10th, 16:30

Sheet B	1	2	3	4	5	6	7	8	9	10	Final
Norway (Nergård)	2	0	2	0	3	0	0	1	0	1	9
Scotland (Smith)	0	2	0	1	0	1	1	0	2	0	7

Player percentages
Norway		Scotland	
Håvard Vad Petersson	76%	Ross Hepburn	84%
Christoffer Svae	90%	Craig Wilson	71%
Thomas Løvold	75%	David Smith	64%
Torger Nergård	85%	Warwick Smith	76%
Total	82%	Total	74%

=== Bronze medal game ===
Sunday, April 11th, 10:00

Sheet B	1	2	3	4	5	6	7	8	9	10	Final
United States (Fenson)	0	0	0	2	0	0	1	1	0	0	4
Scotland (Smith)	0	0	1	0	0	2	0	0	1	2	6

Player percentages
United States		Scotland	
Tyler George	81%	Ross Hepburn	82%
Joe Polo	83%	Craig Wilson	80%
Shawn Rojeski	79%	David Smith	76%
Pete Fenson	78%	Warwick Smith	80%
Total	80%	Total	80%

=== Gold medal game ===
Sunday, April 11th, 16:00

Sheet B	1	2	3	4	5	6	7	8	9	10	Final
Canada (Koe)	3	0	2	0	1	1	0	2	X	X	9
Norway (Nergård)	0	1	0	1	0	0	1	0	X	X	3

Player percentages
Canada		Norway	
Nolan Thiessen	77%	Håvard Vad Petersson	95%
Carter Rycroft	95%	Christoffer Svae	89%
Blake MacDonald	95%	Thomas Løvold	73%
Kevin Koe	95%	Torger Nergård	72%
Total	91%	Total	82%

2010 Capital One World Men's Curling Championship Winners
(Canada)
Canada
32nd title

== Top five player percentages ==
Leads	%	Seconds	%	Thirds	%	Skips	%
(Canada) Nolan Thiessen	89	(Norway) Christoffer Svae	87	(Canada) Blake MacDonald	84	(Canada) Kevin Koe	86
(Switzerland) Rolf Iseli	87	(United States) Joe Polo	84	(Norway) Thomas Løvold	84	(Norway) Torger Nergård	85
(Norway) Håvard Vad Petersson	84	(Canada) Carter Rycroft	83	(Denmark) Ulrik Schmidt (Skip)	81	(Scotland) Warwick Smith (Fourth)	81
(United States) Tyler George	83	(Scotland) Craig Wilson	82	(United States) Shawn Rojeski	78	(United States) Pete Fenson	77
(Denmark) Lars Vilandt	82	(Denmark) Mikkel Poulsen	77	(Scotland) David Smith (Skip)	78	(Denmark) Johnny Frederiksen (Fourth)	76
