= Silvio Zanotelli =

Italian male curler

- Curler ♂
- Born: 3 January 1988 (age 38); Trento, Italy

Team
- Curling club: CC Lago Santo, Cembra, CC Trentino, Cembra

Curling career
- Member Association: Italy
- World Championship: 1 (2010)
- European Championship: 3 (2007, 2010, 2011)
- Other appearances: World Junior Championships: 3 (2004, 2005, 2006), European Youth Olympic Winter Festival: 1 (2005), European Junior Challenge: 2 (2006, 2007)
Medal record
Curling
European Junior Challenge
Gold medal – first place	2006 Prague
Bronze medal – third place	2007 Copenhagen

Silvio Zanotelli (born 3 January 1988 in Trento, Italy) is an Italian curler.

== Teams ==
Season	Skip	Third	Second	Lead	Alternate	Coach	Events
2003–04	Joël Retornaz	Giorgio Da Rin	Davide Corbellari	Mirco Ferretti	Silvio Zanotelli	Rodger Gustaf Schmidt	WJCC 2004 (7th)
2004–05	Silvio Zanotelli	Davide Michielli	Davide Zanotelli	Massimo Micheli	Lorenzo Olivieri	Alessandro Lettieri	EYOWF 2005 (5th)
2004–05	Joël Retornaz	Giorgio Da Rin	Davide Corbellari	Mirco Ferretti	Silvio Zanotelli		WJCC 2005 (10th)
2005–06	Giorgio Da Rin	Silvio Zanotelli	Davide Zanotelli	Lorenzo Olivieri	Simone Gonin	Alessandro Lettieri	EJCC 2006 (gold); WJCC 2006 (10th)
2006–07	Giorgio Da Rin	Silvio Zanotelli	Davide Zanotelli	Massimo Micheli	Mirco Ferretti	Alessandro Lettieri	EJCC 2007 (bronze)
2007–08	Joël Retornaz	Silvio Zanotelli	Marco Mariani	Alessandro Zisa	Davide Zanotelli	Fabio Alverà	ECC 2007 (10th)
2008–09	Joël Retornaz	Silvio Zanotelli	Davide Zanotelli	Julien Genre			
2009–10	Joël Retornaz	Silvio Zanotelli	Davide Zanotelli	Julien Genre	Giorgio Da Rin	Fabio Alverà	WCC 2010 (10th)
2010–11	Joël Retornaz	Silvio Zanotelli	Davide Zanotelli	Mirco Ferretti	Daniele Ferrazza	Daniel Rafael	ECC 2010 (11th)
2011–12	Joël Retornaz	Silvio Zanotelli	Davide Zanotelli	Marco Mariani	Marco Pascale	Daniel Rafael	ECC 2011 (10th)
