= Giorgio Da Rin =

Italian male curler

- Curler ♂
- Born: 10 October 1988 (age 38); Pieve di Cadore, Italy

Team
- Curling club: CC Dolomiti, Cortina d'Ampezzo, Trentino Curling, Cembra

Curling career
- Member Association: Italy
- World Championship: 1 (2010)
- European Championship: 3 (2006, 2008, 2009)
- Other appearances: World Junior Championships: 3 (2004, 2005, 2006), European Junior Challenge: 2 (2006, 2007, 2008)
Medal record
Curling
European Junior Challenge
Gold medal – first place	2006 Prague
Bronze medal – third place	2007 Copenhagen

Giorgio Da Rin (born 10 October 1988 in Pieve di Cadore, Italy) is an Italian curler.

== Teams ==
Season	Skip	Third	Second	Lead	Alternate	Coach	Events
2003–04	Joël Retornaz	Giorgio Da Rin	Davide Corbellari	Mirco Ferretti	Silvio Zanotelli	Rodger Gustaf Schmidt	WJCC 2004 (7th)
2004–05	Joël Retornaz	Giorgio Da Rin	Davide Corbellari	Mirco Ferretti	Silvio Zanotelli		WJCC 2005 (10th)
2005–06	Giorgio Da Rin	Silvio Zanotelli	Davide Zanotelli	Lorenzo Olivieri	Simone Gonin	Alessandro Lettieri	EJCC 2006 (gold); WJCC 2006 (10th)
2006–07	Stefano Ferronato	Alessandro Zisa	Marco Mariani	Adriano Lorenzi	Giorgio Da Rin		ECC 2006 (12th)
2006–07	Giorgio Da Rin	Silvio Zanotelli	Davide Zanotelli	Massimo Micheli	Mirco Ferretti	Alessandro Lettieri	EJCC 2007 (bronze)
2007–08	Giorgio Da Rin	Alberto Alverà	Julien Genre	Massimo Micheli	Matteo Siorpaes	Adolfo Mosaner	EJCC 2008 (7th)
2008–09	Stefano Ferronato	Alessandro Zisa	Gianpaolo Zandegiacomo	Marco Mariani	Giorgio Da Rin	Fabio Alverà	ECC 2008 (12th)
2009–10	Stefano Ferronato	Gianpaolo Zandegiacomo	Marco Mariani	Alessandro Zisa	Giorgio da Rin	Jean-Pierre Rütsche	ECC 2009 (10th)
Joël Retornaz	Silvio Zanotelli	Davide Zanotelli	Julien Genre	Giorgio Da Rin	Fabio Alverà		WCC 2010 (10th)
