= Maria Poulsen =

Danish curler

- Curler
- Born: 29 October 1984 (age 42); Hvidovre, Denmark

Team
- Curling club: Hvidovre CC, Hvidovre, Denmark
- Skip: Lene Nielsen
- Third: Helle Simonsen
- Second: Jeanne Ellegaard
- Lead: Maria Poulsen
- Alternate: Mette de Neergaard

Curling career
- World Championship: 6 (2003, 2004, 2005, 2011, 2012, 2013)
- European Championship: 7 (2004, 2005, 2007, 2010, 2011, 2012, 2013)
- Olympic: 2 (2006, 2014)
Medal record
Curling
Representing Denmark
European Curling Championships
Bronze medal – third place	2005 Garmish-Partenkirchen
Bronze medal – third place	2007 Füssen
World Junior Curling Championships
Bronze medal – third place	2006 Jeonju

Maria Poulsen (born 29 October 1984) is a Danish curler. She currently plays lead for the Lene Nielsen rink.

Poulsen was the lead on the Denise Dupont rink that finished 9th place at the 2001 World Junior Curling Championships. At the 2004 World Junior Curling Championships, the rink, now skipped by Madeleine Dupont finished 6th. They then finished 8th at the 2004 Ford World Women's Curling Championship and in 8th at the 2004 European Curling Championships. They then finished in 5th place at the 2005 World Junior Curling Championships, followed by a 10th-place finish at the 2005 World Women's Curling Championship.

During the 2005–06 season, Poulsen was the alternate for the Dorthe Holm rink that won a bronze medal at the 2005 European Curling Championships and in 8th place at the 2006 Winter Olympics. That season she also played lead for Nielsen's junior rink, winning a bronze medal at the 2006 World Junior Curling Championships.

With Nielsen, Poulsen won another bronze at the 2007 European Curling Championships, followed by a 5th-place finish at the 2010 European Curling Championships. They represented Denmark at the 2011 Capital One World Women's Curling Championship which was played in Denmark.
