= 2006 World Junior Curling Championships =

- Host city: Jeonju, South Korea
- Dates: March 11–19
- Men's winner: Canada
- Skip: Charley Thomas
- Third: Geoff Walker
- Second: Rollie Robinson
- Lead: Kyle Reynolds
- Alternate: Matthew Ng
- Finalist: Sweden (Nils Carlsén)
- Women's winner: Russia
- Skip: Liudmila Privivkova
- Third: Ekaterina Galkina
- Second: Margarita Fomina
- Lead: Angela Tuvaeva
- Alternate: Daria Kozlova
- Finalist: Canada (Mandy Selzer)

The 2006 World Junior Curling Championships were held from March 11 to 19 in Jeonju, South Korea.

== Men ==
=== Teams ===
Country	Skip	Third	Second	Lead	Alternate
Canada	Charley Thomas	Geoff Walker	Rollie Robinson	Kyle Reynolds	Matthew Ng
China	Wang Binjiang	Xu Xiaoming	Wang Zi	Zang Jialiang	
Denmark	Rasmus Stjerne	Mikkel Krause	Mikkel Poulsen	Dennis Hansen	Oliver Dupont
Italy	Giorgio da Rin	Silvio Zanotelli	Davide Zanotelli	Lorenzo Olivieri	Simone Gonin
Norway	Anders Bjørgum	Morten Husby	Håvard Mellem	Vemund Ørstad	Kristian Rolvsfjord
Scotland	Logan Gray	Alasdair Guthrie	Keith Duncan Millar	Gordon McDougall	Scott Hamilton
South Korea	Kim Chang-min	Kim Min-chan	Park Jong-duk	Park Jin-oh	Choi Byung-rok
Sweden	Nils Carlsén	Niklas Edin	Marcus Hasselborg	Emanuel Allberg	Fredrik Lindberg
Switzerland	Christian von Gunten	Sven Michel	Sandro Trolliet	Patric Schletti	Alexander Attinger
United States	Chris Plys	Matt Mielke	Kevin Johnson	Tommy Kent	Aaron Wald

=== Round-robin standings ===
Final Round Robin Standings

Key
Teams to Playoffs

Country	Skip	W	L
Scotland	Logan Gray	8	1
Canada	Charley Thomas	7	2
China	Wang Binjiang	5	4
Sweden	Nils Carlsén	5	4
Denmark	Rasmus Stjerne	4	5
South Korea	Kim Chang-min	4	5
Norway	Anders Bjørgum	4	5
Switzerland	Christian von Gunten	3	6
United States	Chris Plys	3	6
Italy	Giorgio da Rin	2	7

=== Round-robin results ===
==== Draw 1 ====
Saturday, March 11, 14:00

Sheet A	1	2	3	4	5	6	7	8	9	10	Final
United States (Plys)	0	1	0	1	0	0	2	0	1	0	5
Norway (Bjørnum)	1	0	1	0	0	1	0	4	0	0	7

Sheet B	1	2	3	4	5	6	7	8	9	10	Final
Italy (da Rin)	0	1	0	2	0	0	1	0	1	0	5
Canada (Thomas)	0	0	2	0	2	1	0	2	0	0	7

Sheet C	1	2	3	4	5	6	7	8	9	10	11	Final
Sweden (Carlsén)	1	1	0	0	1	0	3	0	0	1	0	7
Scotland (Gray)	0	0	3	1	0	1	0	1	1	0	1	8

Sheet D	1	2	3	4	5	6	7	8	9	10	Final
South Korea (Kim)	1	0	0	0	1	1	1	0	0	0	4
Denmark (Stjerne)	0	0	1	3	0	0	0	1	1	1	7

Sheet E	1	2	3	4	5	6	7	8	9	10	Final
Switzerland (von Guten)	0	0	0	1	0	0	0	0	1	0	2
China (Wang)	0	1	0	0	0	0	1	0	0	1	3

==== Draw 2 ====
Sunday, March 12, 9:00

Sheet A	1	2	3	4	5	6	7	8	9	10	Final
Switzerland (von Guten)	1	1	0	3	0	3	1	1	X	X	10
Italy (da Rin)	0	0	1	0	1	0	0	0	X	X	2

Sheet B	1	2	3	4	5	6	7	8	9	10	Final
Scotland (Gray)	3	0	2	2	0	2	1	X	X	X	10
China (Wang)	0	1	0	0	1	0	0	X	X	X	2

Sheet C	1	2	3	4	5	6	7	8	9	10	Final
United States (Plys)	0	0	0	0	0	2	0	2	1	0	5
South Korea (Kim)	0	1	1	1	1	0	2	0	0	1	7

Sheet D	1	2	3	4	5	6	7	8	9	10	Final
Sweden (Carlsén)	2	1	2	1	0	3	X	X	X	X	9
Norway (Bjørnum)	0	0	0	0	1	0	X	X	X	X	1

Sheet E	1	2	3	4	5	6	7	8	9	10	11	Final
Canada (Thomas)	0	0	1	0	0	1	1	0	0	2	1	6
Denmark (Stjerne)	0	0	0	0	4	0	0	0	1	0	0	5

==== Draw 3 ====
Sunday, March 12, 19:00

Sheet A	1	2	3	4	5	6	7	8	9	10	Final
Denmark (Stjerne)	0	0	0	2	0	1	2	0	0	1	6
China (Wang)	0	0	1	0	1	0	0	2	0	0	4

Sheet B	1	2	3	4	5	6	7	8	9	10	Final
Norway (Bjørnum)	1	0	4	0	0	0	0	3	0	0	8
South Korea (Kim)	0	2	0	3	0	2	0	0	1	1	9

Sheet C	1	2	3	4	5	6	7	8	9	10	Final
Canada (Thomas)	3	0	0	0	2	0	1	0	0	1	7
Switzerland (von Guten)	0	1	1	1	0	2	0	1	0	0	6

Sheet D	1	2	3	4	5	6	7	8	9	10	Final
Scotland (Gray)	1	0	2	1	0	3	0	2	X	X	9
United States (Plys)	0	1	0	0	1	0	1	0	X	X	3

Sheet E	1	2	3	4	5	6	7	8	9	10	Final
Sweden (Carlsén)	0	2	1	0	1	1	0	1	1	1	8
Italy (da Rin)	1	0	0	1	0	0	1	0	0	0	3

==== Draw 4 ====
Monday, March 13, 14:00

Sheet A	1	2	3	4	5	6	7	8	9	10	Final
Norway (Bjørnum)	0	0	2	0	2	0	X	X	X	X	4
Canada (Thomas)	0	3	0	2	0	7	X	X	X	X	12

Sheet B	1	2	3	4	5	6	7	8	9	10	Final
Sweden (Carlsén)	2	0	0	2	0	0	0	2	1	0	7
United States (Plys)	0	0	2	0	2	0	0	0	0	1	5

Sheet C	1	2	3	4	5	6	7	8	9	10	Final
Italy (da Rin)	0	0	3	0	1	0	0	0	0	0	4
China (Wang)	1	0	0	3	0	0	0	1	0	1	6

Sheet D	1	2	3	4	5	6	7	8	9	10	Final
Denmark (Stjerne)	0	0	1	1	4	0	0	0	0	0	7
Switzerland (von Guten)	0	1	0	0	0	1	1	0	2	1	6

Sheet E	1	2	3	4	5	6	7	8	9	10	Final
South Korea (Kim)	0	1	0	2	0	1	0	1	0	X	5
Scotland (Gray)	0	0	1	0	6	0	1	0	3	X	11

==== Draw 5 ====
Tuesday, March 14, 9:00

Sheet A	1	2	3	4	5	6	7	8	9	10	Final
Sweden (Carlsén)	0	0	1	1	1	2	0	3	2	X	10
Switzerland (von Guten)	1	2	0	0	0	0	1	0	0	X	4

Sheet B	1	2	3	4	5	6	7	8	9	10	Final
Canada (Thomas)	0	0	0	0	0	2	0	2	0	0	4
Scotland (Gray)	0	1	1	2	0	0	3	0	1	0	8

Sheet C	1	2	3	4	5	6	7	8	9	10	Final
Norway (Bjørnum)	0	0	0	3	0	0	1	0	1	1	6
Denmark (Stjerne)	0	0	0	0	1	0	0	2	0	0	3

Sheet D	1	2	3	4	5	6	7	8	9	10	Final
Italy (da Rin)	2	0	1	0	2	0	2	0	1	0	8
South Korea (Kim)	0	2	0	2	0	3	0	1	0	1	10

Sheet E	1	2	3	4	5	6	7	8	9	10	Final
China (Wang)	0	0	0	1	0	0	0	2	0	0	3
United States (Plys)	0	1	2	0	1	0	0	0	1	2	7

==== Draw 6 ====
Tuesday, March 14, 19:00

Sheet A	1	2	3	4	5	6	7	8	9	10	Final
China (Wang)	0	0	0	0	0	2	1	0	0	3	6
South Korea (Kim)	0	0	1	0	1	0	0	2	1	0	5

Sheet B	1	2	3	4	5	6	7	8	9	10	Final
United States (Plys)	1	1	0	0	1	1	1	0	2	0	7
Denmark (Stjerne)	0	0	1	1	0	0	0	2	0	0	4

Sheet C	1	2	3	4	5	6	7	8	9	10	Final
Scotland (Gray)	1	0	2	0	1	0	0	0	X	X	4
Italy (da Rin)	0	3	0	0	0	3	3	1	X	X	10

Sheet D	1	2	3	4	5	6	7	8	9	10	Final
Canada (Thomas)	0	1	0	1	0	0	X	X	X	X	2
Sweden (Carlsén)	3	0	2	0	4	2	X	X	X	X	11

Sheet E	1	2	3	4	5	6	7	8	9	10	11	Final
Norway (Bjørnum)	0	1	2	0	2	0	0	1	1	0	1	8
Switzerland (von Guten)	2	0	0	1	0	2	0	0	0	2	0	7

==== Draw 7 ====
Wednesday, March 15, 14:00

Sheet A	1	2	3	4	5	6	7	8	9	10	Final
Italy (da Rin)	1	0	1	0	2	0	2	0	1	0	7
United States (Plys)	0	1	0	3	0	2	0	1	0	1	8

Sheet B	1	2	3	4	5	6	7	8	9	10	Final
China (Wang)	0	2	0	0	0	2	0	2	1	0	7
Norway (Bjørnum)	0	0	0	1	0	0	2	0	0	1	4

Sheet C	1	2	3	4	5	6	7	8	9	10	Final
South Korea (Kim)	0	1	0	0	2	0	1	0	1	0	5
Canada (Thomas)	0	0	2	2	0	1	0	2	0	1	8

Sheet D	1	2	3	4	5	6	7	8	9	10	Final
Switzerland (von Guten)	0	0	1	1	0	0	2	0	X	X	4
Scotland (Gray)	1	4	0	0	3	1	0	6	X	X	15

Sheet E	1	2	3	4	5	6	7	8	9	10	Final
Denmark (Stjerne)	0	1	1	0	0	1	1	1	0	1	6
Sweden (Carlsén)	2	0	0	2	0	0	0	0	0	0	4

==== Draw 8 ====
Thursday, March 16, 9:00

Sheet A	1	2	3	4	5	6	7	8	9	10	Final
Scotland (Gray)	0	1	0	1	2	2	0	2	0	1	9
Denmark (Stjerne)	1	0	2	0	0	0	1	0	1	0	5

Sheet B	1	2	3	4	5	6	7	8	9	10	Final
South Korea (Kim)	0	1	0	0	2	0	1	0	X	X	4
Switzerland (von Guten)	1	0	3	1	0	2	0	4	X	X	11

Sheet C	1	2	3	4	5	6	7	8	9	10	Final
China (Wang)	0	0	1	0	1	0	2	1	1	0	6
Sweden (Carlsén)	0	0	0	2	0	1	0	0	0	1	4

Sheet D	1	2	3	4	5	6	7	8	9	10	Final
Norway (Bjørnum)	0	0	1	1	1	1	0	4	0	0	8
Italy (da Rin)	0	3	0	0	0	0	1	0	1	0	5

Sheet E	1	2	3	4	5	6	7	8	9	10	Final
United States (Plys)	0	2	0	0	1	0	0	2	0	0	5
Canada (Thomas)	0	0	2	0	0	1	0	0	2	2	7

==== Draw 9 ====
Thursday, March 16, 19:00

Sheet A	1	2	3	4	5	6	7	8	9	10	Final
South Korea (Kim)	2	0	3	0	3	0	1	1	0	1	11
Sweden (Carlsén)	0	3	0	2	0	2	0	0	1	0	8

Sheet B	1	2	3	4	5	6	7	8	9	10	Final
Denmark (Stjerne)	0	0	0	0	1	1	2	1	0	0	5
Italy (da Rin)	1	2	2	2	0	0	0	0	1	1	9

Sheet C	1	2	3	4	5	6	7	8	9	10	Final
Switzerland (von Guten)	0	2	3	0	0	2	0	3	X	X	10
United States (Plys)	0	0	0	0	1	0	1	0	X	X	2

Sheet D	1	2	3	4	5	6	7	8	9	10	Final
China (Wang)	0	0	0	0	0	1	0	1	1	0	3
Canada (Thomas)	1	0	0	2	0	0	1	0	0	1	5

Sheet E	1	2	3	4	5	6	7	8	9	10	Final
Scotland (Gray)	0	0	0	1	0	1	1	1	0	1	5
Norway (Bjørnum)	1	0	1	0	1	0	0	0	0	0	3

=== Playoffs ===
Semifinals
1	Sweden	6
4	Scotland	4
2	Canada	7
3	China	6

Gold-medal game
1	Sweden	3
2	Canada	7

Bronze-medal game
3	China	4
4	Scotland	12

==== Semifinals ====
Saturday, March 18, 19:00

Sheet A	1	2	3	4	5	6	7	8	9	10	Final
China (Wang)	0	1	0	0	2	0	1	0	2	0	6
Canada (Thomas)	0	0	2	2	0	1	0	2	0	0	7

Sheet B	1	2	3	4	5	6	7	8	9	10	Final
Sweden (Carlsén)	1	1	0	2	0	1	0	1	0	0	6
Scotland (Gray)	0	0	1	0	0	0	2	0	0	1	4

==== Bronze-medal game ====
Sunday, March 19, 9:00

Sheet D	1	2	3	4	5	6	7	8	9	10	Final
Scotland (Gray)	3	1	0	2	0	3	3	0	X	X	12
China (Wang)	0	0	1	0	1	0	0	2	X	X	4

==== Gold-medal game ====
Sunday, March 19, 13:30

Sheet D	1	2	3	4	5	6	7	8	9	10	Final
Sweden (Carlsén)	0	0	1	0	0	1	1	0	0	0	3
Canada (Thomas)	0	0	0	0	3	0	0	3	1	0	7

== Women ==
=== Teams ===
Country	Skip	Third	Second	Lead	Alternate
Canada	Mandy Selzer	Erin Selzer	Kristen Mitchell	Megan Selzer	Penny Roy
China	Sun Yue	Yu Xinna	Chen Yinjie	Li Xue	
Denmark	Lene Nielsen	Helle Simonsen	Camilla Jørgensen	Maria Poulsen	Jeanne Ellegaard
Norway	Kristin Moen Skaslien	Marte Bakk	Solveig Enoksen	Ingrid Stensrud	Anneline Skårsmoen
Russia	Liudmila Privivkova	Ekaterina Galkina	Margarita Fomina	Angela Tuvaeva	Daria Kozlova
Scotland	Jennifer Morrison	Alison Black	Katie Stevenson	Rachel Speedie	Sarah Reid
South Korea	Kim Ji-suk	Lee Hyo-kyeong	Koo Jung-yun	Lee Seul-bee	Jang Hyo-sun
Sweden	Stina Viktorsson	Sofie Sidén	Maria Wennerström	Matilda Rodin	Sabina Kraupp
Switzerland	Michèle Jäggi	Stéphanie Jäggi	Nicole Schwägli	Isobel Kurt	Sandra Zurbuchen
United States	Nina Spatola	Megan O'Connell	Jaclyn Mueller	Jordan Moulton	Molly Bonner

=== Round-robin standings ===
Final Round Robin Standings

Key
Teams to Playoffs
Teams to Tiebreakers

Country	Skip	W	L
Russia	Liudmila Privivkova	7	2
Canada	Mandy Selzer	6	3
Denmark	Lene Nielsen	5	4
Switzerland	Michèle Jäggi	5	4
Norway	Kristin Moen Skaslien	5	4
South Korea	Kim Ji-suk	5	4
Scotland	Jennifer Morrison	4	5
Sweden	Stina Viktorsson	4	5
China	Sun Yue	3	6
United States	Nina Spatola	1	8

=== Round-robin results ===
==== Draw 1 ====
Saturday, March 11, 08:30

Sheet A	1	2	3	4	5	6	7	8	9	10	Final
Switzerland (Jäggi)	2	0	1	0	1	0	0	0	1	0	5
Sweden (Viktorsson)	0	3	0	1	0	0	2	1	0	1	8

Sheet B	1	2	3	4	5	6	7	8	9	10	11	Final
South Korea (Kim)	0	1	0	0	1	0	1	0	0	1	0	4
Russia (Privivkova)	1	0	1	0	0	1	0	1	0	0	1	5

Sheet C	1	2	3	4	5	6	7	8	9	10	Final
United States (Spatola)	1	0	1	3	1	0	1	0	1	3	11
China (Sun)	0	2	0	0	0	3	0	1	0	0	6

Sheet D	1	2	3	4	5	6	7	8	9	10	11	Final
Norway (Skaslien)	1	1	0	2	0	1	0	0	2	0	0	7
Canada (Selzer)	0	0	1	0	3	0	1	1	0	1	1	8

Sheet E	1	2	3	4	5	6	7	8	9	10	Final
Denmark (Nielsen)	0	0	2	0	0	1	1	1	1	0	6
Scotland (Morrison)	1	0	0	2	3	0	0	0	0	1	7

==== Draw 2 ====
Saturday, March 11, 19:00

Sheet A	1	2	3	4	5	6	7	8	9	10	Final
Denmark (Nielsen)	0	3	0	3	1	0	0	0	1	0	8
South Korea (Kim)	2	0	1	0	0	2	0	2	0	3	10

Sheet B	1	2	3	4	5	6	7	8	9	10	Final
China (Sun)	0	0	1	0	0	1	0	1	0	X	3
Scotland (Morrison)	0	4	0	1	1	0	3	0	1	X	10

Sheet C	1	2	3	4	5	6	7	8	9	10	Final
Switzerland (Jäggi)	2	5	0	0	2	0	0	1	0	1	11
Norway (Skaslien)	0	0	1	1	0	2	3	0	2	0	9

Sheet D	1	2	3	4	5	6	7	8	9	10	Final
United States (Spatola)	0	1	0	1	0	1	1	0	1	0	5
Sweden (Viktorsson)	4	0	1	0	1	0	0	2	0	2	10

Sheet E	1	2	3	4	5	6	7	8	9	10	Final
Russia (Privivkova)	1	0	2	2	0	2	0	1	0	0	8
Canada (Selzer)	0	1	0	0	2	0	1	0	1	1	6

==== Draw 3 ====
Sunday, March 12, 14:00

Sheet A	1	2	3	4	5	6	7	8	9	10	11	Final
Canada (Selzer)	1	0	3	0	0	0	1	0	0	1	1	7
Scotland (Morrison)	0	1	0	1	0	2	0	2	0	0	0	6

Sheet B	1	2	3	4	5	6	7	8	9	10	Final
Sweden (Viktorsson)	0	0	1	0	1	0	1	0	3	0	6
Norway (Skaslien)	0	2	0	3	0	2	0	1	0	0	8

Sheet C	1	2	3	4	5	6	7	8	9	10	Final
Russia (Privivkova)	0	0	3	1	0	1	0	2	0	0	7
Denmark (Nielsen)	1	0	0	0	2	0	1	0	1	1	6

Sheet D	1	2	3	4	5	6	7	8	9	10	Final
China (Sun)	0	2	0	0	0	2	0	0	1	4	9
Switzerland (Jäggi)	0	0	1	3	0	0	1	1	0	0	6

Sheet E	1	2	3	4	5	6	7	8	9	10	Final
United States (Spatola)	0	1	0	0	1	0	3	0	1	0	6
South Korea (Kim)	0	0	2	1	0	2	0	3	0	1	9

==== Draw 4 ====
Monday, March 13, 9:00

Sheet A	1	2	3	4	5	6	7	8	9	10	11	Final
Sweden (Viktorsson)	2	0	1	0	0	0	1	0	0	1	0	5
Russia (Privivkova)	0	1	0	1	1	1	0	1	0	0	1	6

Sheet B	1	2	3	4	5	6	7	8	9	10	Final
United States (Spatola)	0	2	0	2	0	0	0	2	0	0	6
Switzerland (Jäggi)	2	0	1	0	2	1	0	0	2	2	10

Sheet C	1	2	3	4	5	6	7	8	9	10	Final
South Korea (Kim)	0	1	1	1	0	1	2	1	0	0	7
Scotland (Morrison)	1	0	0	0	1	0	0	0	2	1	5

Sheet D	1	2	3	4	5	6	7	8	9	10	11	Final
Canada (Selzer)	1	1	0	2	1	0	0	0	0	1	0	6
Denmark (Nielsen)	0	0	2	0	0	2	0	2	0	0	1	7

Sheet E	1	2	3	4	5	6	7	8	9	10	Final
Norway (Skaslien)	0	2	0	1	0	3	0	3	0	0	9
China (Sun)	2	0	1	0	1	0	1	0	2	1	8

==== Draw 5 ====
Monday, March 13, 19:00

Sheet A	1	2	3	4	5	6	7	8	9	10	Final
United States (Spatola)	0	0	0	0	0	0	1	0	1	X	2
Denmark (Nielsen)	0	0	1	1	2	1	0	1	0	X	6

Sheet B	1	2	3	4	5	6	7	8	9	10	Final
Russia (Privivkova)	1	0	0	0	2	1	0	0	0	2	6
China (Sun)	0	1	1	1	0	0	0	1	1	0	5

Sheet C	1	2	3	4	5	6	7	8	9	10	11	Final
Sweden (Viktorsson)	0	0	2	0	0	1	1	0	0	1	0	5
Canada (Selzer)	1	1	0	1	1	0	0	1	0	0	1	6

Sheet D	1	2	3	4	5	6	7	8	9	10	Final
South Korea (Kim)	0	0	0	1	0	0	1	0	1	1	4
Norway (Skaslien)	0	0	0	0	3	0	0	4	0	0	7

Sheet E	1	2	3	4	5	6	7	8	9	10	Final
Scotland (Morrison)	0	0	0	1	0	0	1	0	1	0	3
Switzerland (Jäggi)	0	0	1	0	1	1	0	2	0	2	7

==== Draw 6 ====
Tuesday, March 14, 14:00

Sheet A	1	2	3	4	5	6	7	8	9	10	11	Final
Scotland (Morrison)	0	2	0	0	1	0	1	0	2	1	0	7
Norway (Skaslien)	1	0	0	2	0	1	0	3	0	0	1	8

Sheet B	1	2	3	4	5	6	7	8	9	10	Final
Switzerland (Jäggi)	0	1	0	1	0	0	2	0	1	0	5
Canada (Selzer)	1	0	1	0	0	2	0	1	0	1	6

Sheet C	1	2	3	4	5	6	7	8	9	10	Final
China (Sun)	0	1	0	0	1	1	0	1	0	1	5
South Korea (Kim)	2	0	2	1	0	0	1	0	1	0	7

Sheet D	1	2	3	4	5	6	7	8	9	10	Final
Russia (Privivkova)	1	1	0	3	0	0	1	1	3	X	10
United States (Spatola)	0	0	1	0	2	2	0	0	0	X	5

Sheet E	1	2	3	4	5	6	7	8	9	10	11	Final
Sweden (Viktorsson)	0	0	0	1	2	1	0	2	0	0	1	7
Denmark (Nielsen)	0	0	2	0	0	0	1	0	2	1	0	6

==== Draw 7 ====
Wednesday, March 15, 9:00

Sheet A	1	2	3	4	5	6	7	8	9	10	Final
South Korea (Kim)	0	1	0	1	0	0	1	1	0	0	4
Switzerland (Jäggi)	1	0	1	0	3	1	0	0	1	2	9

Sheet B	1	2	3	4	5	6	7	8	9	10	11	Final
Scotland (Morrison)	2	0	1	0	2	0	1	0	0	2	0	8
Sweden (Viktorsson)	0	3	0	1	0	3	0	0	1	0	2	10

Sheet C	1	2	3	4	5	6	7	8	9	10	Final
Norway (Skaslien)	2	0	0	2	1	1	0	1	0	0	7
Russia (Privivkova)	0	1	2	0	0	0	1	0	3	1	8

Sheet D	1	2	3	4	5	6	7	8	9	10	Final
Denmark (Nielsen)	0	0	0	1	2	1	1	0	0	1	6
China (Sun)	0	0	1	0	0	0	0	1	1	0	3

Sheet E	1	2	3	4	5	6	7	8	9	10	Final
Canada (Selzer)	0	1	0	1	1	0	2	1	1	0	7
United States (Spatola)	2	0	1	0	0	0	0	0	0	0	3

==== Draw 8 ====
Wednesday, March 15, 19:00

Sheet A	1	2	3	4	5	6	7	8	9	10	Final
China (Sun)	1	0	0	2	0	1	1	2	0	0	7
Canada (Selzer)	0	0	1	0	1	0	0	0	1	1	4

Sheet B	1	2	3	4	5	6	7	8	9	10	Final
Norway (Skaslien)	0	0	0	0	1	0	2	0	0	0	3
Denmark (Nielsen)	1	0	0	1	0	1	0	2	2	0	7

Sheet C	1	2	3	4	5	6	7	8	9	10	Final
Scotland (Morrison)	2	0	0	0	0	4	2	0	1	3	12
United States (Spatola)	0	0	0	2	3	0	0	1	0	0	6

Sheet D	1	2	3	4	5	6	7	8	9	10	11	Final
Sweden (Viktorsson)	0	1	0	3	0	0	1	1	0	0	0	6
South Korea (Kim)	1	0	1	0	2	0	0	0	1	1	1	7

Sheet E	1	2	3	4	5	6	7	8	9	10	Final
Switzerland (Jäggi)	0	1	0	2	1	2	0	2	2	X	10
Russia (Privivkova)	2	0	1	0	0	0	2	0	0	X	5

==== Draw 9 ====
Thursday, March 16, 14:00

Sheet A	1	2	3	4	5	6	7	8	9	10	Final
Norway (Skaslien)	1	1	0	0	0	3	0	0	0	3	8
United States (Spatola)	0	0	1	2	1	0	0	1	0	0	5

Sheet B	1	2	3	4	5	6	7	8	9	10	Final
Canada (Selzer)	0	0	0	3	1	1	0	1	0	1	7
South Korea (Kim)	0	0	0	0	0	0	3	0	3	0	6

Sheet C	1	2	3	4	5	6	7	8	9	10	Final
Denmark (Nielsen)	0	0	3	0	0	0	3	0	1	0	7
Switzerland (Jäggi)	2	1	0	0	1	0	0	1	0	0	5

Sheet D	1	2	3	4	5	6	7	8	9	10	Final
Scotland (Morrison)	0	2	2	0	0	0	2	0	1	0	7
Russia (Privivkova)	0	0	0	1	1	1	0	1	0	1	5

Sheet E	1	2	3	4	5	6	7	8	9	10	Final
China (Sun)	2	0	0	2	1	2	1	0	1	X	9
Sweden (Viktorsson)	0	0	2	0	0	0	0	1	0	X	3

=== Relegation game ===
Friday, March 17, 9:00

Sheet A	1	2	3	4	5	6	7	8	9	10	Final
Scotland (Morrison)	0	1	2	0	1	3	0	0	3	0	10
Sweden (Viktorsson)	1	0	0	1	0	0	2	2	0	0	6

Sweden relegated to 2007 European Junior Curling Challenge.

=== Tiebreakers ===
Friday, March 17, 9:00

Sheet E	1	2	3	4	5	6	7	8	9	10	Final
South Korea (Kim)	3	0	2	0	0	0	1	0	0	0	6
Denmark (Nielsen)	0	3	0	1	2	1	0	2	1	2	12

Sheet D	1	2	3	4	5	6	7	8	9	10	11	Final
Switzerland (Jäggi)	1	0	2	0	3	0	0	0	2	0	1	9
Norway (Bjørgum)	0	1	0	0	0	2	2	2	0	1	0	8

=== Playoffs ===
Semifinals
1	Russia	8
4	Switzerland	3
2	Canada	8
3	Denmark	5

Gold-medal game
1	Russia	5
2	Canada	4

Bronze-medal game
3	Denmark	8
4	Switzerland	4

==== Semifinals ====
Saturday, March 18, 14:00

Sheet B	1	2	3	4	5	6	7	8	9	10	Final
Russia (Privivkova)	1	1	0	0	0	3	0	2	1	X	8
Switzerland (Jäggi)	0	0	0	0	2	0	1	0	0	X	3

Sheet D	1	2	3	4	5	6	7	8	9	10	Final
Canada (Selzer)	0	0	2	0	1	1	0	2	2	0	8
Denmark (Nielsen)	0	0	0	2	0	0	2	0	0	1	5

==== Bronze-medal game ====
Sunday, March 19, 9:00

Sheet C	1	2	3	4	5	6	7	8	9	10	Final
Denmark (Nielsen)	0	0	1	1	1	0	1	0	3	1	8
Switzerland (Jäggi)	0	1	0	0	0	1	0	2	0	0	4

==== Gold-medal game ====
Sunday, March 19, 13:30

Sheet C	1	2	3	4	5	6	7	8	9	10	Final
Russia (Privivkova)	0	0	2	0	0	0	0	2	0	1	5
Canada (Selzer)	0	1	0	0	0	1	1	0	1	0	4
