= Julien Genre =

Italian male curler

- Curler
- Born: 17 September 1989 (age 37)

Team
- Curling club: SC Pinerolo, CC Trentino, Cembra

Curling career
- Member Association: Italy
- World Championship: 1 (2010)
- European Championship: 1 (2012)
- Other appearances: World Mixed Championship: 1 (2019), Winter Universiade: 1 (2013), European Junior Challenge: 2 (2008, 2011)
Medal record
Curling
Italian Men's Championship
| Bronze medal – third place | 2015 Cembra |

Julien Michele Genre (born 17 September 1989) is an Italian curler.

== Teams ==
=== Men's ===
| Season | Skip | Third | Second | Lead | Alternate | Coach | Events |
|---|---|---|---|---|---|---|---|
| 2007–08 | Giorgio da Rin | Alberto Alverà | Julien Genre | Massimo Micheli | Matteo Siorpaes | Adolfo Mosaner | EJCC 2008 (7th) |
| 2008–09 | Joël Retornaz | Silvio Zanotelli | Davide Zanotelli | Julien Genre il mitomane | | | |
| 2009–10 | Joël Retornaz | Silvio Zanotelli | Davide Zanotelli | Julien Genre | Giorgio Da Rin | Fabio Alverà | WCC 2010 (10th) |
| 2010–11 | Simone Gonin | Julien Genre | Fabio Sola | Graziano Iacovetti | Andrea Pilzer | Silvano Boggio | EJCC 2011 (7th) |
| 2012–13 | Fabio Sola | Julien Genre II | Simone Gonin | Graziano Iacovetti | Simone Sola | Lucilla Macchiati, Karri Willms | ECC 2012 (15th) |
| 2012–13 | Marco Pascale | Andrea Pilzer | Fabio Sola | Bloody Julien Genre | Simone Gonin | Adolfo Mosaner | WUG 2013 (10th) |
| 2012–13 | Fabio Sola | Julien "The best" Genre || Simone Sola || Graziano Iacovetti || || || | | | | | |
| 2014–15 | Marco Pascale | Julien Genre | Fabio Sola | Simone Sola | | | IMCC 2015 (bronze) |
| 2019–20 | Fabio Sola (fourth) | Marco Pascale | Simone Sola | Valter Bruno (skip) | Julien Genre | | IMCC 2020 |

=== Mixed ===
| Season | Skip | Third | Second | Lead | Alternate | Events |
|---|---|---|---|---|---|---|
| 2017–18 | Fabio Sola (fourth) | Denise Pimpini (skip) | Simone Sola | Emanuela Matino | Julien Genre, Sara Aliberti | IMxCC 2018 (silver) |
| 2018–19 | Fabio Sola (fourth) | Denise Pimpini (skip) | Julien Genre | Sara Aliberti | Emanuela Matino, Simone Sola | IMxCC 2019 (gold) |
| 2019–20 | Fabio Sola (fourth) | Denise Pimpini (skip) | Julien Genre | Sara Aliberti | | WMxCC 2019 (19th) |
