= Amaury Pernette =

French curler (born 1986)

- Curler ♂
- Born: 18 May 1986 (age 40)

Team
- Curling club: Besançon Skating Club, Besançon

Curling career
- Member Association: France
- World Mixed Doubles Championship: 1 (2011)
- Other appearances: European Junior Challenge: 2 (2005, 2007)
Medal record
Curling
World Mixed Doubles Championship
Bronze medal – third place	2011 St. Paul
European Junior Challenge
Silver medal – second place	2005 Copenhagen

Amaury Pernette (born 18 May 1986) is a French curler. He is a 2011 World mixed doubles bronze medallist.

== Teams ==
=== Men's ===
Season	Skip	Third	Second	Lead	Alternate	Coach	Events
2003–04	Wilfrid Coulot	Amaury Pernette	Romain Jot	Jean-Olivier Biechely	Michaef Crevoisier	André Jouvent	WJCC 2004 (B group) (5th)
2004–05	Wilfrid Coulot	Amaury Pernette	Romain Borini	Alexandre Ceriovi		Lerale-Alexandre Janc	EJCC 2005 (silver)
2006–07	Wilfrid Coulot	Romain Borini	Amaury Pernette	Aurélien Fasano	Damien Bertoluzzi	Marc Lerave-Alexandre	EJCC 2007 (5th)

=== Mixed doubles ===
Season	Skip	Third	Coach	Events
2010–11	Amaury Pernette	Pauline Jeanneret	Thomas Dufour	FMDCC 2010 (gold); WMDCC 2011 (bronze)
