= Angela Tuvaeva =

Russian curler

- Curler ♀
- Born: 20 September 1985 (age 41); Moscow, USSR

Team
- Curling club: Moskvitch CC, Moscow

Curling career
- Member Association: Russia
- World Championship: 1 (2002)
- European Championship: 2 (2001, 2003)
- Olympic: 1 (2002)
- Other appearances: European Mixed Championship: 2 (2005, 2006), World Junior Championships: 5 (2001, 2002, 2005, 2006, 2007), European Junior Curling Challenge: 1 (2005)
Medal record
Curling
European Mixed Championship
Bronze medal – third place	2006 Claut
World Junior Championships
Gold medal – first place	2006 Jeonju
European Junior Curling Challenge
Gold medal – first place	2005 Copenhagen

Angela Yevgenyevna Tuvaeva (Russian: Анже́ла Евге́ньевна Тюва́ева; born 20 September 1985 in Moscow, USSR) is a Russian curler, a 2006 World junior champion, a 2006 European mixed bronze medallist and a six-time Russian women's champion (2001, 2002, 2003, 2004, 2005, 2007).

She participated at the 2002 Winter Olympics, where the Russian team finished in tenth place.

Also she is a former basketball player and a streetball player.

== Teams ==
=== Women's ===
Season	Skip	Third	Second	Lead	Alternate	Coach	Events
2000–01	Nina Golovtchenko	Nkeiruka Ezekh	Anastassia Skoultan	Angela Tuvaeva	Liudmila Privivkova	Olga Andrianova	WJCC 2001 (6th)
2001–02	Olga Jarkova	Yana Nekrasova	Nkeiruka Ezekh	Angela Tuvaeva		Olga Andrianova	ECC 2001 (7th)
2001–02	Nkeiruka Ezekh	Anastassia Skoultan	Angela Tuvaeva	Anna Rubtsova	Liudmila Privivkova	Olga Andrianova	WJCC 2002 (8th)
2001–02	Olga Jarkova	Nkeiruka Ezekh	Yana Nekrasova	Anastassia Skoultan	Angela Tuvaeva	Olga Andrianova	WOG 2002 (10th); WCC 2002 (7th)
2003–04	Olga Jarkova	Nkeiruka Ezekh	Yana Nekrasova	Ludmila Privivkova	Angela Tuvaeva	Olga Andrianova	ECC 2003 (8th)
2004–05	Liudmila Privivkova	Ekaterina Galkina	Margarita Fomina	Angela Tuvaeva	Nkeiruka Ezekh	Olga Andrianova, Yory Andrianov	EJCC 2005 (gold)
2004–05	Liudmila Privivkova	Nkeiruka Ezekh	Ekaterina Galkina	Margarita Fomina	Angela Tuvaeva	Olga Andrianova	WJCC 2005 (5th)
2005–06	Liudmila Privivkova	Ekaterina Galkina	Margarita Fomina	Angela Tuvaeva	Daria Kozlova	Olga Andrianova	WJCC 2006 (gold)
2006–07	Liudmila Privivkova	Ekaterina Galkina	Margarita Fomina	Angela Tuvaeva	Daria Kozlova	Olga Andrianova	WJCC 2007 (7th)

=== Mixed ===
Season	Skip	Third	Second	Lead	Alternate	Events
2005–06	Alexander Kirikov	Margarita Fomina	Dmitri Abanin	Angela Tuvaeva	Alexey Kamnev, Ilona Grichina	EMxCC 2005 (6th)
2006–07	Alexander Kirikov	Daria Kozlova	Dmitri Abanin	Julia Svetova	Andrey Drozdov, Angela Tuvaeva	EMxCC 2006 (bronze)
