= Lisignago =

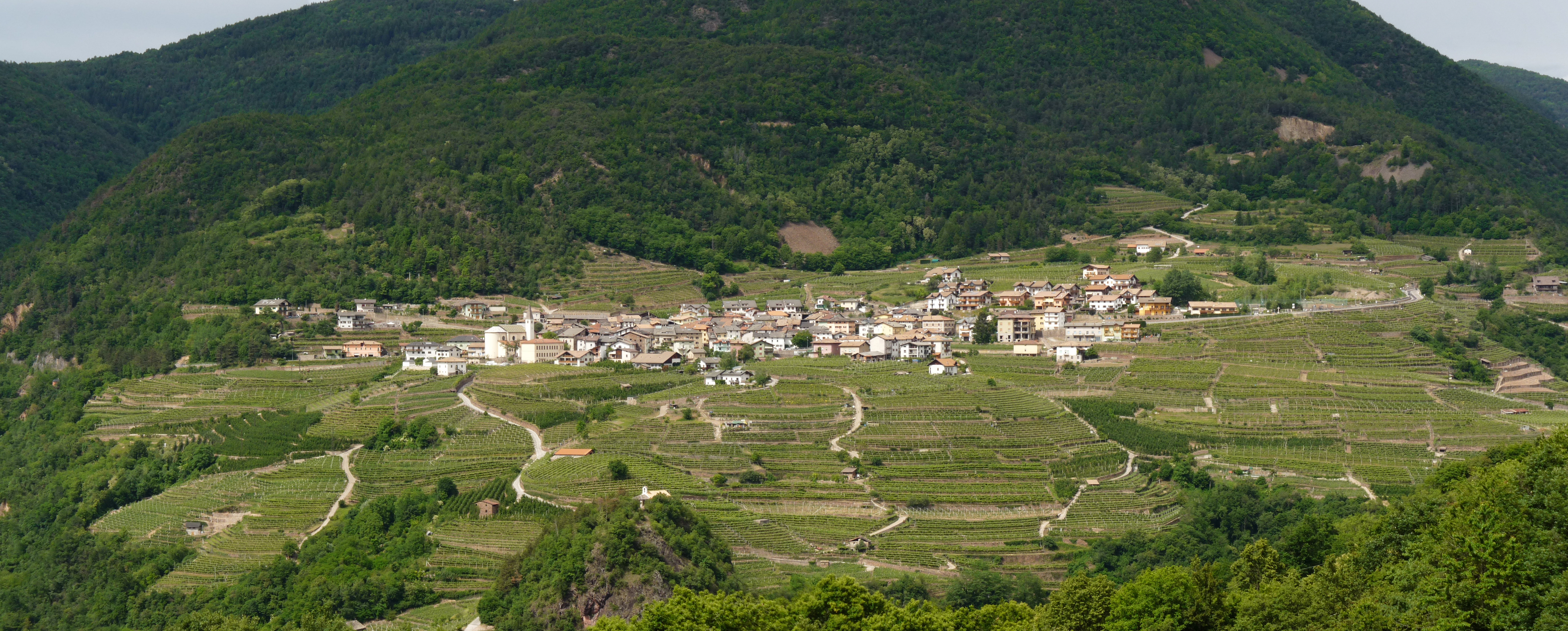
Lisignago-panorama from Albiano

Lisignago (Lisgnàc in local dialect) was a comune (municipality) in Trentino in the northern Italian region Trentino-Alto Adige/Südtirol, located about 12 kilometres (7 mi) northeast of Trento. On 1 January 2016 it was merged with Cembra to form a new municipality, Cembra Lisignago.
