= 2007 European Curling Championships =

International curling competition

Coordinates: 47°34′N 10°42′E

The 2007 Le Gruyère European Curling Championships were held in Füssen, Germany December 1-8, 2007. Scotland, skipped by David Murdoch, won the gold medal by beating Norway's Thomas Ulsrud 5-3 in the final. Norway had not lost a single game entering the final.

On the women's side, Anette Norberg of Sweden captured the gold medal with a 9-4 victory over Scotland's Kelly Wood. This marks Norberg's sixth European championship in the last seven years.

== Men's teams ==
=== Group A ===
Nation	Skip	Third	Second	Lead	Alternate
Czech Republic	Jiri Snitil	Martin Snitil	Jindrich Kitzberger	Marek Vydra	Milos Hoferka
Denmark	Johnny Frederiksen	Lars Vilandt	Bo Jensen	Kenneth Hertsdahl	Mikkel Poulsen
Finland	Kalle Kiiskinen	Jani Sullanmaa	Teemu Salo	Jari Rouvinen	Wille Mäkelä
France	Thomas Dufour	Tony Angiboust	Jan Ducroz	Richard Ducroz	Raphael Mathieu
Germany	Andy Kapp	Uli Kapp	Andreas Lang	Andreas Kempf	Holger Höhne
Italy	Joel Retornaz	Silvio Zanotelli	Marco Mariani	Alessandro Zisa	Davide Zanotelli
Norway	Thomas Ulsrud	Torger Nergård	Christoffer Svae	Havard Vad Petersson	Thomas Due
Scotland	David Murdoch	Graeme Connal	Peter Smith	Euan Byers	Peter Loudon
Sweden	Peja Lindholm	James Dryburgh	Viktor Kjäll	Anders Eriksson	Magnus Ekdahl
Switzerland	Toni Müller	Stefan Maurer	Nicolas Haurswirth	Martin Stucki	Ralph Stöckli

==== Standings ====
Country	G	W	L
Norway	9	9	0
Denmark	9	6	3
Switzerland	9	6	3
Scotland	9	5	4
Germany	9	5	4
Sweden	9	5	4
France	9	4	5
Czech Republic	9	3	6
Finland	9	2	7
Italy	9	0	9

- Finland and Italy drop to the B-Group

==== Results ====
All Times Local

===== Session 1 =====
December 1, 2006, 12:00

Sheet 1	1	2	3	4	5	6	7	8	9	10	Final
Germany (Kapp) 🔨	0	1	0	2	0	0	2	0	1	3	9
Finland (Kiiskinen)	0	0	2	0	4	0	0	1	0	0	7

Sheet 2	1	2	3	4	5	6	7	8	9	10	Final
Switzerland (Müller) 🔨	0	0	0	1	3	0	0	3	X	X	7
France (Dufour)	0	0	0	0	0	0	1	0	X	X	1

Sheet 3	1	2	3	4	5	6	7	8	9	10	Final
Italy (Retornaz)	0	0	1	0	0	0	1	0	0	X	2
Scotland (Murdoch) 🔨	2	0	0	0	2	1	0	1	0	X	6

Sheet 4	1	2	3	4	5	6	7	8	9	10	Final
Sweden (Lindholm)	0	1	1	0	3	0	0	0	1	0	6
Norway (Ulsrud) 🔨	1	0	0	4	0	0	0	2	0	1	8

Sheet 5	1	2	3	4	5	6	7	8	9	10	Final
Czech Republic (Snítil) 🔨	0	0	1	0	0	0	0	X	X	X	1
Denmark (Frederiksen)	0	1	0	3	3	1	2	X	X	X	10

===== Session 2 =====
December 1, 2006, 20:00

Sheet 1	1	2	3	4	5	6	7	8	9	10	Final
Czech Republic (Snítil)	0	0	1	0	3	0	0	1	1	-	0
Switzerland (Müller) 🔨	0	2	0	1	0	2	0	0	0	-	0

(Czech Republic ran out of time)

Sheet 2	1	2	3	4	5	6	7	8	9	10	Final
Scotland (Murdoch) 🔨	0	0	0	1	0	2	0	1	0	X	4
Denmark (Frederiksen)	0	2	0	0	2	0	0	0	2	X	6

Sheet 3	1	2	3	4	5	6	7	8	9	10	Final
Germany (Kapp)	0	1	0	1	0	2	0	2	0	X	6
Sweden (Lindholm) 🔨	0	0	4	0	3	0	2	0	2	X	11

Sheet 4	1	2	3	4	5	6	7	8	9	10	Final
Italy (Retornaz)	0	2	0	0	1	0	1	X	X	X	4
Finland (Kiiskinen) 🔨	2	0	3	2	0	2	0	X	X	X	9

Sheet 5	1	2	3	4	5	6	7	8	9	10	Final
France (Dufour)	0	0	1	0	0	1	0	X	X	X	2
Norway (Ulsrud) 🔨	2	3	0	0	1	0	3	X	X	X	9

===== Session 3 =====
December 2, 2006, 13:00

Sheet 1	1	2	3	4	5	6	7	8	9	10	Final
Norway (Ulsrud)	0	2	0	0	1	1	0	0	2	4	10
Denmark (Frederiksen) 🔨	2	0	0	1	0	0	0	1	0	0	4

Sheet 2	1	2	3	4	5	6	7	8	9	10	Final
Finland (Kiiskinen) 🔨	1	0	1	0	2	0	0	1	0	X	5
Sweden (Lindholm)	0	1	0	4	0	1	0	0	2	X	8

Sheet 3	1	2	3	4	5	6	7	8	9	10	11	Final
France (Dufour)	0	0	1	2	0	2	0	1	0	0	1	7
Czech Republic (Snítil) 🔨	0	2	0	0	1	0	1	0	0	2	0	6

Sheet 4	1	2	3	4	5	6	7	8	9	10	Final
Scotland (Murdoch)	0	0	1	0	3	0	0	2	1	0	7
Germany (Kapp) 🔨	0	2	0	1	0	3	0	0	0	2	8

Sheet 5	1	2	3	4	5	6	7	8	9	10	Final
Italy (Retornaz) 🔨	0	0	0	2	0	0	1	0	0	X	3
Switzerland (Müller)	0	0	2	0	1	2	0	2	1	X	8

===== Session 4 =====
December 3, 2006, 08:00

Sheet 1	1	2	3	4	5	6	7	8	9	10	Final
Finland (Kiiskinen) 🔨	0	1	1	0	0	1	0	0	5	X	8
France (Dufour)	0	0	0	1	1	0	2	0	0	X	4

Sheet 2	1	2	3	4	5	6	7	8	9	10	Final
Italy (Retornaz)	0	2	0	0	1	0	2	0	1	X	6
Germany (Kapp) 🔨	2	0	0	2	0	2	0	2	0	X	8

Sheet 3	1	2	3	4	5	6	7	8	9	10	Final
Switzerland (Müller) 🔨	2	0	1	0	2	0	2	0	2	0	9
Denmark (Frederiksen)	0	2	0	3	0	2	0	1	0	2	10

Sheet 4	1	2	3	4	5	6	7	8	9	10	Final
Norway (Ulsrud) 🔨	2	0	0	2	0	1	1	0	0	0	6
Czech Republic (Snítil)	0	0	1	0	3	0	0	1	0	0	5

Sheet 5	1	2	3	4	5	6	7	8	9	10	Final
Sweden (Lindholm) 🔨	1	0	0	1	0	0	0	0	X	X	2
Scotland (Murdoch)	0	3	1	0	0	0	1	3	X	X	8

===== Session 5 =====
December 3, 2006, 16:00

Sheet 1	1	2	3	4	5	6	7	8	9	10	Final
Italy (Retornaz)	0	0	0	3	0	1	1	0	X	X	5
Czech Republic (Snítil) 🔨	0	0	4	0	5	0	0	2	X	X	11

Sheet 2	1	2	3	4	5	6	7	8	9	10	Final
France (Dufour)	0	0	0	0	0	2	0	2	0	X	4
Scotland (Murdoch) 🔨	2	0	0	0	3	0	1	0	2	X	8

Sheet 3	1	2	3	4	5	6	7	8	9	10	Final
Finland (Kiiskinen)	0	2	0	1	0	0	0	1	0	X	4
Norway (Ulsrud) 🔨	1	0	2	0	1	0	1	0	2	X	7

Sheet 4	1	2	3	4	5	6	7	8	9	10	Final
Switzerland (Müller) 🔨	0	2	0	1	0	1	0	2	0	X	6
Sweden (Lindholm)	0	0	1	0	1	0	1	0	0	X	3

Sheet 5	1	2	3	4	5	6	7	8	9	10	Final
Denmark (Frederiksen) 🔨	1	0	2	0	0	3	0	0	1	1	8
Germany (Kapp)	0	0	0	1	0	0	3	1	0	0	5

===== Session 6 =====
December 4, 2006, 09:00

Sheet 1	1	2	3	4	5	6	7	8	9	10	Final
Denmark (Frederiksen)	0	1	0	1	0	1	0	0	X	X	3
Sweden (Lindholm) 🔨	1	0	2	0	2	0	0	3	X	X	8

Sheet 2	1	2	3	4	5	6	7	8	9	10	Final
Germany (Kapp) 🔨	1	0	2	1	0	0	1	0	0	X	5
Norway (Ulsrud)	0	3	0	0	1	1	0	2	1	X	8

Sheet 3	1	2	3	4	5	6	7	8	9	10	Final
Scotland (Murdoch) 🔨	1	0	1	2	0	0	3	0	1	0	8
Switzerland (Müller)	0	2	0	0	1	0	0	2	0	0	5

Sheet 4	1	2	3	4	5	6	7	8	9	10	11	Final
France (Dufour) 🔨	2	0	0	1	0	0	0	0	2	0	1	6
Italy (Retornaz)	0	0	2	0	1	1	0	0	0	1	0	5

Sheet 5	1	2	3	4	5	6	7	8	9	10	Final
Finland (Kiiskinen)	0	1	0	0	1	0	2	0	0	0	4
Czech Republic (Snítil) 🔨	2	0	0	0	0	1	0	1	0	1	5

===== Session 7 =====
December 4, 2006, 19:00

Sheet 1	1	2	3	4	5	6	7	8	9	10	Final
Switzerland (Müller) 🔨	1	0	2	0	2	0	1	0	0	X	6
Germany (Kapp)	0	2	0	1	0	1	0	0	0	X	4

Sheet 2	1	2	3	4	5	6	7	8	9	10	Final
Denmark (Frederiksen)	1	0	2	1	0	0	2	1	0	1	8
Finland (Kiiskinen) 🔨	0	1	0	0	1	3	0	0	2	0	7

Sheet 3	1	2	3	4	5	6	7	8	9	10	Final
Sweden (Lindholm)	0	0	0	1	0	0	0	2	0	X	3
France (Dufour) 🔨	0	0	1	0	0	1	3	0	2	X	7

Sheet 4	1	2	3	4	5	6	7	8	9	10	Final
Czech Republic (Snítil)	1	0	0	0	0	2	0	3	0	X	6
Scotland (Murdoch) 🔨	0	1	0	0	1	0	1	0	1	X	4

Sheet 5	1	2	3	4	5	6	7	8	9	10	Final
Norway (Ulsrud)	0	1	0	2	0	0	1	1	1	1	7
Italy (Retornaz) 🔨	3	0	1	0	1	0	0	0	0	0	5

===== Session 8 =====
December 5, 2006, 14:00

Sheet 1	1	2	3	4	5	6	7	8	9	10	Final
Scotland (Murdoch) 🔨	0	0	2	0	2	0	0	2	0	0	6
Norway (Ulsrud)	1	0	0	1	0	0	2	0	2	1	7

Sheet 2	1	2	3	4	5	6	7	8	9	10	Final
Sweden (Lindholm)	0	0	2	0	0	2	0	1	0	1	6
Czech Republic (Snítil) 🔨	1	0	0	0	1	0	1	0	2	0	5

Sheet 3	1	2	3	4	5	6	7	8	9	10	Final
Denmark (Frederiksen)	1	1	0	1	0	0	2	0	1	0	6
Italy (Retornaz) 🔨	0	0	3	0	1	0	0	0	0	1	5

Sheet 4	1	2	3	4	5	6	7	8	9	10	Final
Finland (Kiiskinen)	0	0	0	0	1	0	0	0	X	X	1
Switzerland (Müller) 🔨	0	2	2	0	0	2	0	1	X	X	7

Sheet 5	1	2	3	4	5	6	7	8	9	10	Final
Germany (Kapp)	0	0	2	0	1	0	2	0	2	X	7
France (Dufour) 🔨	0	1	0	0	0	1	0	1	0	X	3

===== Session 9 =====
December 6, 2006, 08:00

Sheet 1	1	2	3	4	5	6	7	8	9	10	Final
Sweden (Lindholm) 🔨	0	0	3	0	1	1	0	1	0	X	6
Italy (Retornaz)	0	0	0	1	0	0	1	0	1	X	3

Sheet 2	1	2	3	4	5	6	7	8	9	10	Final
Norway (Ulsrud)	0	2	0	0	0	2	0	5	X	X	9
Switzerland (Müller) 🔨	1	0	1	0	0	0	1	0	X	X	3

Sheet 3	1	2	3	4	5	6	7	8	9	10	11	Final
Czech Republic (Snítil)	0	1	2	0	0	0	1	0	0	2	0	6
Germany (Kapp) 🔨	2	0	0	2	0	0	0	1	1	0	1	7

Sheet 4	1	2	3	4	5	6	7	8	9	10	Final
Denmark (Frederiksen) 🔨	0	0	0	0	1	1	0	1	0	X	3
France (Dufour)	1	1	1	0	0	0	2	0	2	X	7

Sheet 5	1	2	3	4	5	6	7	8	9	10	Final
Scotland (Murdoch) 🔨	2	1	1	0	0	1	1	0	X	X	6
Finland (Kiiskinen)	0	0	0	0	1	0	0	1	X	X	2

===== Tiebreakers =====
Thursday, December 6, 14:00

Team	1	2	3	4	5	6	7	8	9	10	Final
Sweden (Lindholm) 🔨	1	0	0	0	2	0	1	0	0	X	4
Germany (Kapp)	0	2	0	1	0	1	0	4	1	X	9

Thursday, December 6, 20:00

Team	1	2	3	4	5	6	7	8	9	10	Final
Scotland (Murdoch)	0	2	0	0	2	0	1	0	0	2	7
Germany (Kapp) 🔨	2	0	2	0	0	0	0	1	0	0	5

==== Playoffs ====
Page playoff system
1	Norway	7
2	Denmark	4
3	Switzerland	4
4	Scotland	9

Semifinal
2	Denmark	3
4	Scotland	8

Final
1	Norway	3
4	Scotland	5

===== 1 vs. 2 game =====
Friday, December 7, 08:00

Team	1	2	3	4	5	6	7	8	9	10	Final
Denmark (Frederiksen)	0	2	0	0	1	0	1	0	0	X	4
Norway (Ulsrud) 🔨	1	0	3	1	0	1	0	0	1	X	7

===== 3 vs. 4 game =====
Friday, December 7, 08:00

Team	1	2	3	4	5	6	7	8	9	10	Final
Scotland (Murdoch) 🔨	2	4	0	0	1	0	0	2	X	X	9
Switzerland (Müller)	0	0	0	3	0	0	1	0	X	X	4

===== Semifinal =====
Friday, December 7, 19:00

Team	1	2	3	4	5	6	7	8	9	10	Final
Scotland (Murdoch)	0	1	0	1	0	1	2	0	3	X	8
Denmark (Frederiksen) 🔨	1	0	1	0	0	0	0	1	0	X	3

===== Gold Medal Final =====
Saturday, December 8, 13:00

Team	1	2	3	4	5	6	7	8	9	10	Final
Scotland (Murdoch)	0	0	2	0	0	2	1	0	0	X	5
Norway (Ulsrud) 🔨	1	0	0	0	1	0	0	0	1	X	3

=== Group B1 ===
Nation	Skip	Third	Second	Lead	Alternate
Austria	Markus Schagerl	Boris Seidl	Michael Skokan	Manuel Seidl	Armin Kvas
Belgium	Pieter Jan Witzig	Marc Suter	Thomas Suter	Samie Witzig	Dirk Heylen
Greece	Nikolaos Zacharias	Athanassios Pantios	Dimitrios Kolonas	Efstratios Kokkinellis	Nicolas Sarris
Ireland	Peter Wilson	Robin Gray	Peter J. D. Wilson	Neil Fyfe	Tony Tierney
Iceland	Jón Hansen	Olafur Hreinsson	Eirikur Boasson	Agust Hilmarsson	Kristján Porkelsson
Netherlands	Reg Wiebe	Steven van der Cammen	Mark Neeleman	Mark Rurup	Rob Vilain
Spain	Antonio de Mollinedo	Martin Rios	José Manuel Sangüesa	David Rodrigo	

==== Standings ====
Country	W	L
Ireland	6	0
Spain	5	1
Netherlands	4	2
Austria	3	3
Belgium	2	4
Greece	1	5
Iceland	0	6

- The team from Kazakhstan missed the competition.

==== Schedule ====
Draw 1 Saturday, December 1, 08:00

- Ireland 8, Belgium 3
- Netherlands 10, Austria 5
- Greece 3, Spain 11
- Kazakhstan vs. Iceland

Draw 2 Saturday, December 1, 20:00

- Spain 9, Iceland 3
- Greece vs. Kazakhstan
- Belgium 6, Austria 8
- Ireland 9, Netherlands 3

Draw 3 Sunday, December 2, 20:00

- Greece 7, Austria 11
- Ireland 13, Iceland 0
- Kazakhstan vs. Netherlands
- Belgium 5, Spain 6

Draw 4 Monday, December 3, 16:00

- Ireland 10, Greece 2
- Iceland 6, Austria 7
- Netherlands 1, Spain 7
- Kazakhstan vs. Belgium

Draw 5 Tuesday, December 4, 08:00

- Kazakhstan vs. Ireland
- Austria 6, Spain 7
- Greece 1, Belgium 11
- Netherlands 7, Iceland 2

Draw 6 Tuesday, December 4, 20:00

- Belgium 4, Netherlands 5
- Iceland 2, Greece 8
- Spain vs. Kazakhstan
- Austria 4, Ireland 7

Draw 7 Wednesday, December 5, 16:00

- Austria vs. Kazakhstan
- Iceland 3 vs. Belgium 11
- Netherlands 7 vs. Greece 6
- Spain 6 vs. Ireland 9

=== Group B2 ===
Nation	Skip	Third	Second	Lead	Alternate
Belarus	Oleksii Voloshenko	Siarhei Sarokin	Alexandr Radaev	Aliaksandr Tsiushkevich	Pavel Petrov
Bulgaria	Nikolai Runtov	Tihomir Todorov	Stoil Georgiev	Ilian Kirilov	-
England	Andrew Reed	James Dixon	Tom Jaeggi	Andrew Dixon	Neil Murray
Latvia	Ritvars Gulbis	Ainars Gulbis	Aivars Avotins	Normunds Sarsuns	-
Lithuania	Martynas Norkus	Vygantas Zalieckas	Piotras Gerasimovic	Dalius Garakvinas	Smaliukas Arturas
Serbia	Marko Stojanovic	Darko Sovran	Bojan Mijatovic	Vuk Krajacic	-
Wales	Jamie Meikle	Stuart Hills	Andrew Tanner	James Pougher	Adrian Meikle

==== Standings ====
Country	G	W	L
Latvia	6	6	0
England	6	5	1
Wales	6	4	2
Lithuania	6	3	3
Bulgaria	6	2	4
Belarus	6	1	5
Serbia	6	0	6

==== Schedule ====
Draw 1 Saturday, December 1, 12:00

- Belarus 8, Serbia 6
- Bulgaria 2, Lithuania 8
- Latvia 9, Wales 8 (extra end)

Draw 2 Sunday, December 2, 08:00

- Wales 12, Lithuania 4
- Belarus 7, Latvia 9
- Serbia 2, England 14

Draw 3 Sunday, December 2, 16:00

- England 5, Latvia 10
- Bulgaria 3, Wales 8
- Lithuania 9, Belarus 8

Draw 4 Monday, December 3, 08:00

- Bulgaria 11, Belarus 4
- Lithuania 4, England 10
- Latvia 10, Serbia 1

Draw 5 Tuesday, December 4, 12:00

- Wales 10, Belarus 0
- Serbia 4, Lithuania 13
- England 8, Bulgaria 3

Draw 6 Wednesday, December 5, 08:00

- England 8, Wales 3
- Serbia 5, Bulgaria 7
- Lithuania 3, Latvia 8

Draw 7 Wednesday, December 5, 20:00

- Latvia 9, Bulgaria 3
- Wales 12, Serbia 1
- England 8, Belarus 4

=== Group B3 ===
Nation	Skip	Third	Second	Lead	Alternate
Andorra	Andrew Ferguson-Smith	Arnau Friguls Francitorra	Damaso Hernandez	Jordi Torner	Josep Duro
Croatia	Alen Cadez	Dalibor Golec	Drazen Cutic	Ognjen Golubic	Davor Palcec
Estonia	Martin Lill	Jan Anderson	Siim Sildnik	Ingar Mäesalu	Toomas Lill
Hungary	Lajos Belleli	Gabor Riesz	Gabor Ezsöl	Jozsef Nyitrai	Andras Rokusfalvy
Poland	Damian Herman	Piotr Podgórski	Krzysztof Beck	Tomasz Sapiński	Ziemowit Ostrowski
Russia	Alexander Kirikov	Andrey Drozdov	Petr Dron	Alexey Kamnev	Roman Kutuzov
Slovakia	Pavol Pitonak	Frantisek Pitonak	Tomas Pitonak	Peter Pitonak	Milan Kalis

==== Standings ====
Country	G	W	L
Russia	6	5	1
Hungary	6	4	2
Croatia	6	3	3
Slovakia	6	3	3
Andorra	6	2	4
Estonia	6	2	4
Poland	6	2	4

==== Schedule ====
Draw 1 Saturday, December 1, 12:00

- Croatia 8, Estonia 6
- Slovakia 7, Andorra 10
- Poland 2, Russia 13

Draw 2 Sunday, December 2, 08:00

- Russia 5, Andorra 3
- Croatia 12, Poland 7
- Estonia 9, Hungary 8

Draw 3 Sunday, December 2, 16:00

- Hungary 14, Poland 2
- Slovakia 2, Russia 5
- Andorra 10, Croatia 3

Draw 4 Monday, December 3, 08:00

- Slovakia 7, Croatia 4
- Andorra 2, Hungary 9
- Poland 10, Estonia 7

Draw 5 Tuesday, December 4, 12:00

- Estonia 10, Andorra 3
- Hungary 8, Slovakia 5
- Russia 4, Croatia 5

Draw 6 Wednesday, December 5, 08:00

- Hungary 4, Russia 9
- Estonia 2, Slovakia 8
- Andorra 6, Poland 9

Draw 7 Wednesday, December 5, 20:00

- Poland 6, Slovakia 7
- Croatia 4, Hungary 7
- Russia 9, Estonia 5

=== Group B Playoffs ===
==== Challenge Games ====
- England 8, Hungary 5
- England 3, Spain 8

==== Finals ====
Semi-final
1	Ireland	9
2	Latvia	7
3	Russia	6
4	Spain	7

Gold Medal Final
4	Spain	4
1	Ireland	9
Bronze Medal
2	Latvia	5
3	Russia	4

== Women's teams ==
=== Group A ===
Nation	Skip	Third	Second	Lead	Alternate
Austria	Claudia Toth	Karina Toth	Constanze Hummelt	Alexandra Bruckmiller	Jasmin Seidl
Czech Republic	Kateřina Urbanová	Lenka Černovská	Jana Šafaříková	Dana Chabičovská	Sára Jahodová
Denmark	Lene Nielsen	Helle Simonsen	Camilla Jörgensen	Maria Poulsen	Jeanne Ellegaard
Finland	Anne Malmi	Sari Auvinen	Katri Määttä	Tuire Autio	Katja Kiiskinen
Germany	Andrea Schöpp	Monika Wagner	Anna Hartelt	Marie Rotter	Christina Haller
Italy	Diana Gaspari	Giulia Lacedelli	Elettra de Col	Violetta Caldart	Lucrezia Laurenti
Russia	Ludmila Privivkova	Olga Jarkova	Nkeiruka Ezekh	Ekaterina Galkina	Margarita Fomina
Scotland	Kelly Wood	Jackie Lockhart	Lorna Vevers	Lindsay Wood	Karen Addison
Switzerland	Mirjam Ott	Carmen Schäfer	Valeria Spälty	Janine Greiner	Silvana Tirinzoni
Sweden	Anette Norberg	Eva Lund	Cathrine Lindahl	Anna Svärd	Maria Prytz

==== Standings ====
Country	G	W	L
Denmark	9	8	1
Sweden	9	8	1
Switzerland	9	7	2
Scotland	9	6	3
Russia	9	5	4
Germany	9	3	6
Italy	9	3	6
Czech Republic	9	2	7
Austria	9	2	7
Finland	9	1	8

- Austria and Finland drop to the B-Group

===== Tiebreaker =====
Thursday, December 6, 14:00

- Austria 4, Czech Republic 5

==== Schedule ====
All Times Local

Draw 1 Saturday, December 1, 08:00

Sheet 1	1	2	3	4	5	6	7	8	9	10	Final
Russia (Privivkova)	0	1	1	0	0	1	0	1	0	3	7
Austria (Toth) 🔨	0	0	0	1	1	0	1	0	1	0	4

Sheet 2	1	2	3	4	5	6	7	8	9	10	11	Final
Scotland (Wood)	0	1	0	1	0	1	0	2	1	0	1	7
Germany (Schöpp) 🔨	1	0	1	0	2	0	1	0	0	1	0	6

Sheet 3	1	2	3	4	5	6	7	8	9	10	Final
Finland (Malmi)	2	1	1	0	0	3	0	0	0	0	7
Czech Republic (Urbanova) 🔨	0	0	0	2	1	0	1	1	1	0	6

Sheet 4	1	2	3	4	5	6	7	8	9	10	Final
Denmark (Nielsen) 🔨	1	0	1	0	0	0	1	0	0	X	3
Switzerland (Ott)	0	2	0	2	1	1	0	1	3	X	10

Sheet 5	1	2	3	4	5	6	7	8	9	10	Final
Italy (Gaspari)	0	0	1	1	0	0	0	X	X	X	2
Sweden (Norberg) 🔨	2	1	0	0	2	3	1	X	X	X	9

Draw 2 Saturday, December 1, 16:00

Sheet 1	1	2	3	4	5	6	7	8	9	10	Final
Italy (Gaspari) 🔨	0	0	1	0	1	0	X	X	X	X	2
Scotland (Wood)	2	4	0	1	0	2	X	X	X	X	9

Sheet 2	1	2	3	4	5	6	7	8	9	10	Final
Czech Republic (Urbanova)	0	1	0	2	0	0	0	X	X	X	3
Sweden (Norberg) 🔨	3	0	1	0	1	3	1	X	X	X	9

Sheet 3	1	2	3	4	5	6	7	8	9	10	Final
Russia (Privivkova)	0	0	0	2	0	0	0	1	1	1	5
Denmark (Nielsen) 🔨	1	2	1	0	1	0	1	0	0	0	6

Sheet 4	1	2	3	4	5	6	7	8	9	10	Final
Finland (Malmi)	0	0	1	0	0	1	0	X	X	X	2
Austria (Toth) 🔨	3	1	0	1	3	0	1	X	X	X	9

Sheet 5	1	2	3	4	5	6	7	8	9	10	Final
Germany (Schöpp) 🔨	0	1	0	0	2	0	0	0	0	0	3
Switzerland (Ott)	0	0	2	1	0	0	1	0	1	1	6

Draw 3 Sunday, December 2, 09:00

Sheet 1	1	2	3	4	5	6	7	8	9	10	Final
Switzerland (Ott) 🔨	1	0	0	1	0	0	2	0	1	0	5
Sweden (Norberg)	0	1	0	0	1	1	0	2	0	1	6

Sheet 2	1	2	3	4	5	6	7	8	9	10	11	Final
Austria (Toth) 🔨	2	0	0	0	2	0	0	0	1	2	0	7
Denmark (Nielsen)	0	0	3	1	0	1	1	1	0	0	1	8

Sheet 3	1	2	3	4	5	6	7	8	9	10	11	Final
Germany (Schöpp)	0	0	1	0	2	0	0	1	1	1	0	6
Italy (Gaspari) 🔨	1	0	0	1	0	3	1	0	0	0	1	7

Sheet 4	1	2	3	4	5	6	7	8	9	10	Final
Czech Republic (Urbanova)	0	1	0	0	2	0	0	X	X	X	3
Russia (Privivkova) 🔨	2	0	2	3	0	0	2	X	X	X	9

Sheet 5	1	2	3	4	5	6	7	8	9	10	Final
Finland (Malmi) 🔨	0	0	1	0	1	0	1	0	X	X	3
Scotland (Wood)	2	2	0	3	0	1	0	1	X	X	9

Draw 4 Sunday, December 2, 19:00

Sheet 1	1	2	3	4	5	6	7	8	9	10	Final
Austria (Toth) 🔨	1	0	0	0	1	0	2	0	X	X	4
Germany (Schöpp)	0	2	0	1	0	2	0	5	X	X	10

Sheet 2	1	2	3	4	5	6	7	8	9	10	Final
Finland (Malmi) 🔨	1	0	0	1	0	2	2	0	1	0	7
Russia (Privivkova)	0	0	2	0	2	0	0	2	0	2	8

Sheet 3	1	2	3	4	5	6	7	8	9	10	Final
Scotland (Wood)	1	0	2	0	1	1	0	0	3	0	8
Sweden (Norberg) 🔨	0	1	0	4	0	0	2	1	0	1	9

Sheet 4	1	2	3	4	5	6	7	8	9	10	Final
Switzerland (Ott)	3	2	0	2	1	0	X	X	X	X	8
Italy (Gaspari) 🔨	0	0	1	0	0	1	X	X	X	X	2

Sheet 5	1	2	3	4	5	6	7	8	9	10	Final
Denmark (Nielsen) 🔨	0	0	0	1	2	0	2	0	0	1	6
Czech Republic (Urbanova)	1	1	0	0	0	1	0	1	1	0	5

Draw 5 Monday, December 3, 12:00

Sheet 1	1	2	3	4	5	6	7	8	9	10	Final
Finland (Malmi) 🔨	0	0	1	0	2	0	0	1	1	0	5
Italy (Gaspari)	0	1	0	2	0	2	2	0	0	1	8

Sheet 2	1	2	3	4	5	6	7	8	9	10	Final
Germany (Schöpp)	0	0	0	1	1	0	0	0	2	X	4
Czech Republic (Urbanova) 🔨	0	2	2	0	0	1	1	1	0	X	7

Sheet 3	1	2	3	4	5	6	7	8	9	10	Final
Austria (Toth) 🔨	0	0	0	0	0	1	0	X	X	X	1
Switzerland (Ott)	1	1	1	1	3	0	4	X	X	X	11

Sheet 4	1	2	3	4	5	6	7	8	9	10	Final
Scotland (Wood) 🔨	0	1	0	1	0	1	0	1	0	X	4
Denmark (Nielsen)	2	0	1	0	1	0	2	0	2	X	8

Sheet 5	1	2	3	4	5	6	7	8	9	10	Final
Sweden (Norberg)	0	0	3	2	0	0	4	0	0	X	9
Russia (Privivkova) 🔨	1	2	0	0	1	0	0	2	1	X	7

Draw 6 Monday, December 3, 20:00

Sheet 1	1	2	3	4	5	6	7	8	9	10	Final
Sweden (Norberg)	1	0	0	1	0	1	0	0	2	0	5
Denmark (Nielsen) 🔨	0	0	1	0	2	0	2	0	0	2	7

Sheet 2	1	2	3	4	5	6	7	8	9	10	Final
Russia (Privivkova) 🔨	0	1	0	0	0	1	0	1	0	X	3
Switzerland (Ott)	1	0	3	1	1	0	1	0	2	X	9

Sheet 3	1	2	3	4	5	6	7	8	9	10	Final
Czech Republic (Urbanova) 🔨	0	0	0	1	0	0	0	X	X	X	1
Scotland (Wood)	0	1	1	0	0	3	3	X	X	X	8

Sheet 4	1	2	3	4	5	6	7	8	9	10	Final
Germany (Schöpp)	0	0	2	0	1	1	0	1	1	X	6
Finland (Malmi) 🔨	0	1	0	1	0	0	1	0	0	X	3

Sheet 5	1	2	3	4	5	6	7	8	9	10	Final
Austria (Toth) 🔨	0	0	2	0	0	0	0	X	X	X	2
Italy (Gaspari)	0	0	0	2	3	1	2	X	X	X	8

Draw 7 Tuesday, December 4, 14:00

Sheet 1	1	2	3	4	5	6	7	8	9	10	Final
Scotland (Wood) 🔨	0	2	2	0	0	0	0	0	2	X	6
Russia (Privivkova)	0	0	0	1	1	4	1	2	0	X	9

Sheet 2	1	2	3	4	5	6	7	8	9	10	Final
Sweden (Norberg) 🔨	1	3	0	2	2	3	X	X	X	X	11
Austria (Toth)	0	0	2	0	0	0	X	X	X	X	2

Sheet 3	1	2	3	4	5	6	7	8	9	10	Final
Denmark (Nielsen) 🔨	0	2	1	0	1	0	1	2	0	X	7
Germany (Schöpp)	0	0	0	1	0	2	0	0	1	X	4

Sheet 4	1	2	3	4	5	6	7	8	9	10	11	Final
Italy (Gaspari) 🔨	0	1	1	0	1	0	2	0	0	1	0	6
Czech Republic (Urbanova)	0	0	0	2	0	1	0	1	2	0	1	7

Sheet 5	1	2	3	4	5	6	7	8	9	10	Final
Switzerland (Ott) 🔨	2	1	2	0	2	0	2	X	X	X	9
Finland (Malmi)	0	0	0	1	0	1	0	X	X	X	2

Draw 8 Wednesday, December 5, 09:00

Sheet 1	1	2	3	4	5	6	7	8	9	10	Final
Czech Republic (Urbanova)	0	0	0	0	1	0	1	0	0	X	2
Switzerland (Ott) 🔨	1	0	1	0	0	3	0	1	2	X	8

Sheet 2	1	2	3	4	5	6	7	8	9	10	Final
Denmark (Nielsen) 🔨	0	1	1	0	0	4	0	2	0	X	8
Italy (Gaspari)	0	0	0	0	2	0	1	0	1	X	4

Sheet 3	1	2	3	4	5	6	7	8	9	10	Final
Sweden (Norberg)	0	3	1	1	1	0	3	X	X	X	9
Finland (Malmi) 🔨	1	0	0	0	0	1	0	X	X	X	2

Sheet 4	1	2	3	4	5	6	7	8	9	10	Final
Austria (Toth) 🔨	1	0	0	0	1	0	X	X	X	X	2
Scotland (Wood)	0	3	3	5	0	1	X	X	X	X	12

Sheet 5	1	2	3	4	5	6	7	8	9	10	Final
Russia (Privivkova)	0	1	0	0	1	0	0	0	1	X	3
Germany (Schöpp) 🔨	2	0	0	1	0	3	1	1	0	X	8

Draw 9 Wednesday, December 5, 19:00

Sheet 1	1	2	3	4	5	6	7	8	9	10	Final
Denmark (Nielsen) 🔨	2	1	0	1	0	1	0	3	X	X	8
Finland (Malmi)	0	0	1	0	1	0	1	0	X	X	3

Sheet 2	1	2	3	4	5	6	7	8	9	10	Final
Switzerland (Ott)	0	0	1	0	2	0	0	1	0	X	4
Scotland (Wood) 🔨	0	1	0	2	0	1	0	0	2	X	6

Sheet 3	1	2	3	4	5	6	7	8	9	10	Final
Italy (Gaspari) 🔨	0	0	1	0	2	1	0	0	1	X	5
Russia (Privivkova)	1	0	0	1	0	0	3	2	0	X	7

Sheet 4	1	2	3	4	5	6	7	8	9	10	11	Final
Sweden (Norberg) 🔨	1	0	2	0	0	2	1	0	0	1	1	8
Germany (Schöpp)	0	2	0	2	0	0	0	2	1	0	0	7

Sheet 5	1	2	3	4	5	6	7	8	9	10	Final
Czech Republic (Urbanova) 🔨	1	0	1	1	0	2	0	0	0	X	5
Austria (Toth)	0	1	0	0	2	0	3	3	2	X	11

==== Playoffs ====
Page playoff system
1	Denmark	4
2	Sweden	8
3	Switzerland	6
4	Scotland	9

Semifinal
1	Denmark	5
4	Scotland	7

Final
2	Sweden	9
4	Scotland	4

===== 1 vs. 2 game =====
Friday, December 7, 08:00

Team	1	2	3	4	5	6	7	8	9	10	Final
Denmark (Nielsen) 🔨	0	0	2	0	1	0	1	0	0	X	4
Sweden (Norberg)	0	0	0	3	0	1	0	3	1	X	8

===== 3 vs. 4 game =====
Friday, December 7, 08:00

Team	1	2	3	4	5	6	7	8	9	10	Final
Switzerland (Ott) 🔨	1	0	1	1	0	0	2	0	1	0	6
Scotland (Wood)	0	2	0	0	4	1	0	1	0	1	9

===== Semifinal =====
Friday, December 7, 14:00

Team	1	2	3	4	5	6	7	8	9	10	Final
Denmark (Nielsen) 🔨	1	0	0	1	1	0	0	0	2	X	5
Scotland (Wood)	0	2	1	0	0	2	1	1	0	X	7

===== Gold Medal Final =====
Saturday, December 8, 09:00

Team	1	2	3	4	5	6	7	8	9	10	Final
Sweden (Norberg) 🔨	1	2	0	0	2	3	0	1	X	X	9
Scotland (Wood)	0	0	1	1	0	0	2	0	X	X	4

=== Group B1 ===
Nation	Skip	Third	Second	Lead	Alternate
Estonia	Kristiine Lill	Ööle Janson	Katrin Kuusk	Marju Velga	Marje Kaljuvee
France	Sandrine Morand	Karine Baechelen	Delphine Charlet	Brigitte Mathieu	Alexandra Seimbille
Hungary	Ildikó Szekeres	Alexandra Beres	Gyöngyi Nagy	Boglárka Adam	Krisztina Bartalus
Ireland	Marie O'Kane	Louise Kerr	Jane Paterson	Gillian Drury	-
Lithuania	Virginija Paulauskaitė	Evelina Aleksejenko	Ruta Norkiene	Rasa Smaliukiene	-
Norway	Dordi Nordby	Marianne Rorvik	Charlotte Hovring	Ingrid Stensrud	Marte Bakk
Spain	Montse Marti	Silvia Ferrer	Aránzazu Dominguez	Francisca Cladellas	Silvia Orriols

==== Standings ====
Country	G	W	L
Norway	6	6	0
France	6	4	2
Hungary	6	4	2
Estonia	6	4	2
Lithuania	6	2	4
Ireland	6	1	5
Spain	6	0	6

===== Tiebreakers =====
Thursday, December 6, 08:00

- France 7, Estonia 5

Thursday, December 6, 12:00

- Hungary 5, France 6

==== Schedule ====
Draw 1 Saturday, December 1, 08:00

- Norway 18, Lithuania 0
- France 12, Spain 2

Draw 2 Saturday, December 1, 16:00

- Estonia 9, Lithuania 8
- Spain 4, Ireland 10
- France 4, Norway 7

Draw 3 Sunday, December 2, 12:00

- Norway 10, Ireland 3
- Estonia 5, France 6
- Lithuania 4, Hungary 9

Draw 4 Sunday, December 2, 20:00

- Estonia 12, Hungary 10

Draw 5 Monday, December 3, 12:00

- Hungary 13, France 9
- Spain 2, Norway 9
- Ireland 8, Estonia 10

Draw 6 Monday, December 3, 20:00

- France 12, Lithuania 5
- Spain 2, Estonia 12
- Ireland 3, Hungary 10

Draw 7 Tuesday, December 4, 16:00

- Norway 11, Estonia 6
- Hungary 12, Spain 2
- Lithuania 9, Ireland 6

Draw 8 Wednesday, December 5, 12:00

- Lithuania 8, Spain 5
- Ireland 2, France 7
- Hungary 4, Norway 8

=== Group B2 ===
Nation	Skip	Third	Second	Lead	Alternate
Croatia	Katarina Radonic	Nikolina Petric	Zrinka Muhek	Marta Muzdalo	Slavica Roso
England	Kirsty Balfour	Caroline Reed	Claire Grimwood	Sarah McVey	Joan Reed
Latvia	Anete Zabere	Dace Regza	Solvita Gulbe	Jelena Stepanova	Evita Regza
Netherlands	Shari Leibbrandt-Demmon	Margrietha Voskuilen	Ester Romijn	Idske de Jong	-
Poland	Marta Szeliga-Frynia	Katarzyna Wicik	Agnieszka Ogrodniczek	Marianna Das	Justyna Zalewska
Slovakia	Barbora Vojtusova	Gabriela Kajanova	Katarina Langova	Zuzana Axamitova	-

==== Standings ====
Country	G	W	L
England	5	4	1
Netherlands	5	4	1
Croatia	5	2	3
Latvia	5	2	3
Poland	5	2	3
Slovakia	5	1	4

==== Schedule ====
Draw 1 Sunday, December 2, 12:00

- Croatia 8, Slovakia 7
- Netherlands 4, England 3
- Latvia 9, Poland 4

Draw 2 Monday, December 3, 12:00

- Poland 5, England 9
- Latvia 6, Slovakia 9
- Croatia 3, Netherlands 10

Draw 3 Monday, December 3, 20:00

- Poland 7, Netherlands 8
- Latvia 4, Croatia 9
- England 11, Slovakia 6

Draw 4 Tuesday, December 4, 16:00

- England 11, Latvia 4
- Poland 13, Croatia 2
- Slovakia 5, Netherlands 10

Draw 5 Wednesday, December 5, 12:00

- Netherlands 5, Latvia 7
- England 11, Croatia 3
- Slovakia 3, Poland 9

=== Group B Playoffs ===
Semi-final
1	Norway	4
2	England	5
4	France	4
3	Netherlands	9

Gold Medal Final
3	Netherlands	6
2	England	8
Bronze Medal
4	France	2
1	Norway	0
