= Cembra Lisignago =

- Comune
- Comune di Cembra Lisignago
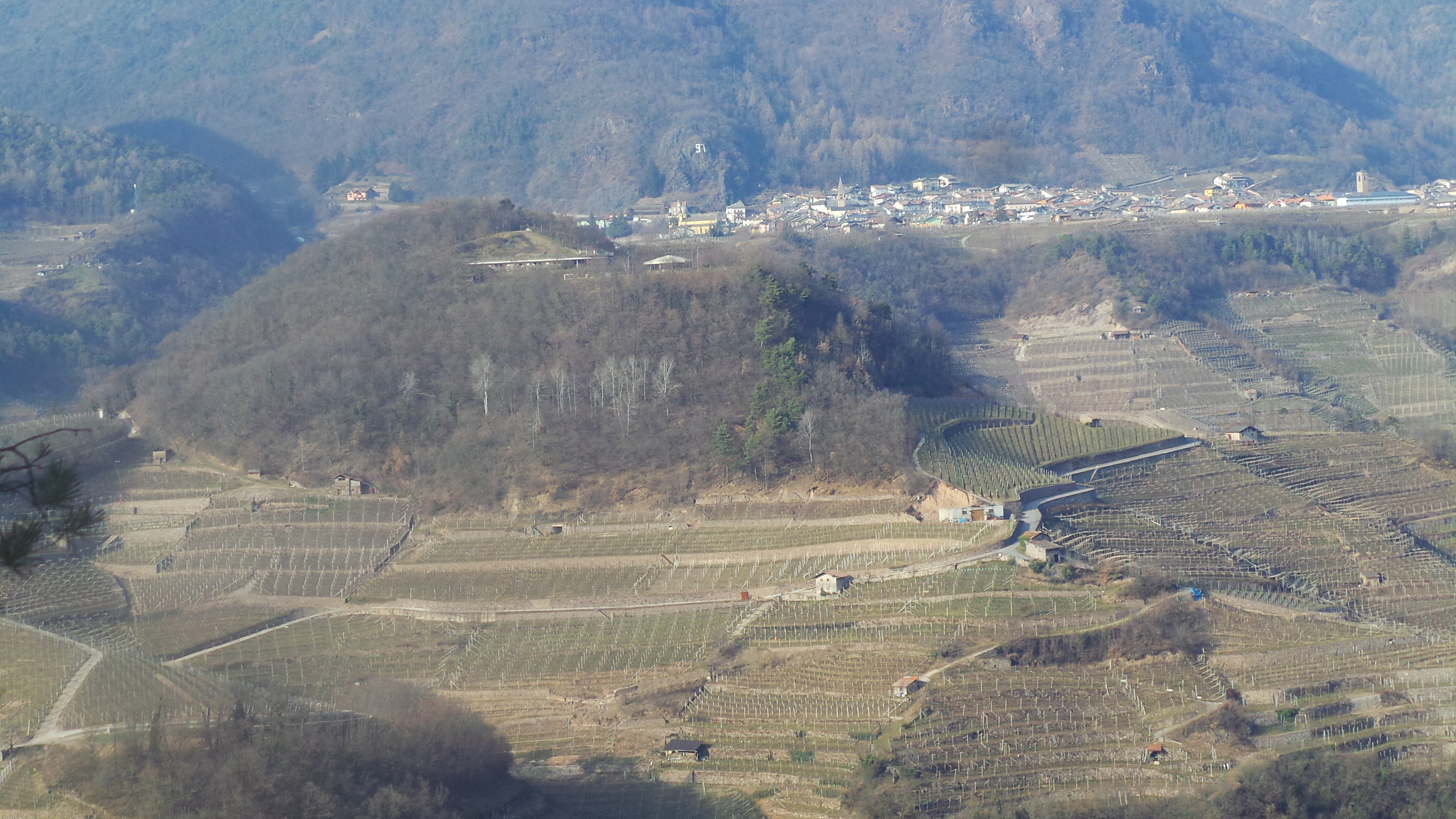

- Location within Italy Location within Trentino-Alto Adige/Südtirol
- Coordinates: 46°11′N 11°13′E
- Country: Italy
- Region: Trentino-Alto Adige/Südtirol
- Province: Trentino (TN)

Government
  - Mayor: Alessandra Ferrazza

Area
  - Total: 24.11 km^{2} (9.31 sq mi)

Population (2026)
  - Total: 2,374
  - Density: 98.47/km^{2} (255.0/sq mi)
- Time zone: UTC+1 (CET)
  - Summer (DST): UTC+2 (CEST)
- Postal code: 38084
- Dialing code: 0461
- Website: Official website

Cembra Lisignago is a comune (municipality) in the Province of Trentino in the Italian region Trentino-Alto Adige/Südtirol.

It was established on 1 January 2016 by the merger of the municipalities of Cembra and Lisignago.
