= Helle Simonsen (curler) =

Danish curler

- Curler
- Born: 7 September 1984 (age 42); Hvidovre, Denmark

Team
- Curling club: Hvidovre CC, Hvidovre, Denmark

Curling career
- World Championship: 6 (2004, 2005, 2011, 2012, 2013, 2015)
- European Championship: 6 (2004, 2007, 2010, 2011, 2012, 2013)
- Olympic: 1 (2014)
Medal record
Curling
Representing Denmark
European Curling Championships
Bronze medal – third place	2007 Füssen
World Junior Curling Championships
Bronze medal – third place	2006 Jeonju

Helle Simonsen (born 7 September 1984 in Hvidovre) is a Danish curler.

== Career ==
In 2001, she represented Denmark for the first time, playing third for Denise Dupont. The team qualified for the 2001 World Junior Curling Championships, where they finished 9th. They did not manage to qualify again until the 2004 World Junior Curling Championships, when Simonsen played second for the rink (now skipped by Madeleine Dupont. Denmark finished 6th. That same year, they represented Denmark at the 2004 Ford World Women's Curling Championship where they placed 8th and the 2004 European Curling Championships where they placed 8th as well.

Simonsen would then join up with Nielsen. She found some success with her new rink, winning bronze medals at the 2006 World Junior Curling Championships and the 2007 European Curling Championships. They did not return to an international event until 2010 when they finished in 5th at the 2010 European Curling Championships. They represented Denmark at the 2011 Capital One World Women's Curling Championship where they played in their home country.

In February 2016, it was announced that Simonsen, who has polyendocrine metabolic ovarian syndrome (PMOS), had tested positive for banned substances (5aAdiol and 5bAdiol) she took as a hormonal remedy as a pregnancy aid. As a result, she did not play with her team at the 2016 Ford World Women's Curling Championship. She was ultimately given a 15-month ban, beginning from the date she tested positive in February 2016.
