= 2007 European Junior Curling Challenge =

The 2007 European Junior Curling Challenge was held from January 2 to January 6, 2007, in Tårnby, Denmark.

== Junior Men ==
=== Teams Group A ===
Czech Republic	Finland	France
Skip: Third: Second: Lead: Alternate:	Skip: Third: Second: Lead: Alternate:	Skip: Wilfrid Coulot Third: Romain Borini; Second: Amaury Pernette; Lead: Damien Bertoluzzi; Alternate: Aurélien Fasano
Hungary	Italy	Spain
Skip: Third: Second: Lead: Alternate:	Skip: Giorgio Da Rin Third: Silvio Zanotelli; Second: Davide Zanotelli; Lead: Massimo Micheli; Alternate: Mirco Ferretti	Skip: Third: Second: Lead: Alternate:

=== Teams Group B ===
Estonia	Germany	Latvia
Skip: Third: Second: Lead: Alternate:	Skip: Third: Second: Lead: Alternate:	Skip: Third: Second: Lead: Alternate:
Netherlands	Poland	Russia
Skip: Jaap van Dorp Third: Diederick Bontenbal; Second: Bart van der Lubbe; Lead: Carlo Glasbergen; Alternate: Floyd Koelewijn	Skip: Kamil Wachulak Third: Dorian Łebzuch; Second: Witek Abramowicz; Lead: Przemek Boszczyk; Alternate:	Skip: Third: Second: Lead: Alternate:

=== Results ===
==== Group A ====
===== 3 January 2007 =====
Spain	4–13	Italy
Hungary	3–5	France
Czech Republic	9–1	Finland
Italy	7–2	Finland
Hungary	14–2	Spain
Czech Republic	7–4	France

===== Standings =====
Country	G	W	L
Czech Republic	2	2	0
Italy	2	2	0
France	2	1	1
Hungary	2	1	1
Finland	2	0	2
Spain	2	0	2

==== Group B ====
===== 2 January 2007 =====
Netherlands	4–5	Latvia

===== 3 January 2007 =====
Estonia	5–7	Russia
Poland	2–6	Germany
Germany	5–4	Russia
Latvia	4–8	Poland
Estonia	5–6	Netherlands

===== Standings =====
Country	G	W	L
Germany	2	2	0
Latvia	2	1	1
Russia	2	1	1
Poland	2	1	1
Netherlands	2	1	1
Estonia	2	0	2

== Junior Women ==
=== Teams ===
Czech Republic	Finland	Germany
Skip: Anna Kubešková Third: Linda Klímová; Second: Tereza Plíšková; Lead: Michaela Nádherová; Alternate: Luisa Illková	Skip: Third: Second: Lead: Alternate:	Skip: Third: Second: Lead: Alternate:
Hungary	Italy	Poland
Skip: Third: Second: Lead: Alternate:	Skip: Third: Second: Lead: Alternate:	Skip: Third: Second: Lead: Alternate:
Spain	Sweden	
Skip: Third: Second: Lead: Alternate:	Skip: Third: Second: Lead: Alternate:	

=== Results ===
==== 2 January ====
Finland	1–9	Italy
Germany	5–9	Czech Republic
Poland	2–14	Sweden
Hungary	7–6	Spain
Sweden	10–4	Spain
Poland	6–13	Hungary
Italy	8–2	Czech Republic
Finland	6–11	Germany

==== 3 January ====
Poland	5–13	Czech Republic
Finland	11–1	Spain
Hungary	3–7	Germany
Italy	6–3	Sweden
Sweden	9–3	Germany
Italy	8–2	Hungary
Finland	10–5	Poland
Spain	1–12	Czech Republic

==== Standings ====
Country	G	W	L
Italy	4	4	0
Sweden	4	3	1
Czech Republic	4	3	1
Hungary	4	2	2
Germany	4	2	2
Finland	4	2	2
Poland	4	0	4
Spain	4	0	4
