= Cembra =

Comune in Italy

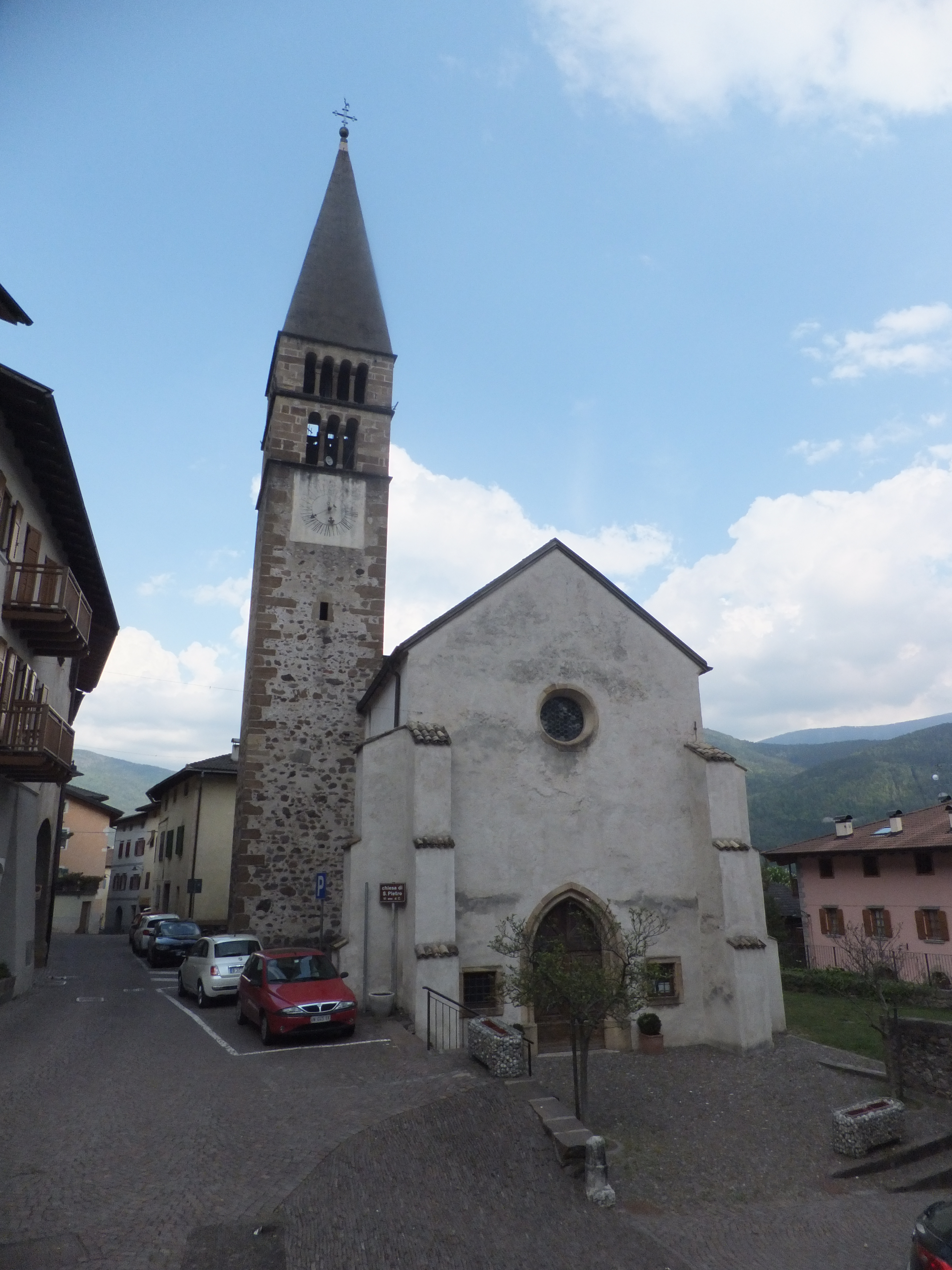
San Pietro church.

Cembra was a comune (municipality) in Trentino in the northern Italian region Trentino-Alto Adige/Südtirol, located about 15 kilometres (9 mi) northeast of Trento. On 1 January 2016 it was merged with Lisignago to form a new municipality, Cembra Lisignago.
